= List of tomboys in fiction =

This list includes fictional characters characterized as tomboys.

== Anime and manga ==
Characters	Title	Duration	Notes
Renny Ai	Ninja Senshi Tobikage	1985–86	A cheerful tomboy who loves the protagonist, Jou.
Tomo Aizawa	Tomo-chan Is a Girl!	2015–19	A tomboy frustrated by her male friend Jun's inability to see her as a girl and possible romantic partner.
Itsuki Akiba; Nami	I"s	2002–03; 2005–06	Itsuki Akiba is the childhood best friend of protagonist Ichitaka and dreams of being a sculptor. Nami is an energetic and "manly" girl who is the best friend of Iori.
Fūko Kirisawa	Flame of Recca	1995–2002	A tomboy who gets into fights with Recca, who she has a crush on.
Sarah McDougal	Love Hina	2000	A nine-year-old tomboy with mischievous tendencies.
Runo Misaki; Mira Fermin; Fabia Sheen	Bakugan Battle Brawlers	2007–08	Runo is a tomboy who can be a "sore loser" and sometimes impedes her team. She is jealous of her friend Julie and has a crush on a male character, Dan. She also had a huge blade inside herself which can cut through anything. Mira and Fabia are also tomboys.
Rin Natsuki (Cure Rouge)	Yes! PreCure 5	2007–08	A middle school student in her second year who is "boyish," skilled at playing sports and has a "girly side."
Tsubasa Onodera	Love Get Chu: Miracle Seiyū Hakusho	2006	A tomboy who prefers to be the voice for boys instead of girls.
Princess Peach	Otenba Pīchi-hime English: Tomboy Princess Peach	1992-1994	Princess Peach from Mario stars in this manga gag strip as a young tomboyish girl.
Rin	Nagasarete Airantō	2002–present	A tomboy who is a carpenter's apprentice.
Sanae Nakazawa (Sanae Ozora)	Captain Tsubasa	1981–present	A tomboyish girl who was bossy and noisy in her childhood.
Masumi Sera	Case Closed	1994–present	A tomboyish teen detective who aids Conan in different cases.
Kaoru Shimizu	Major	1994–2010	A tomboy who is interested in baseball, has a "manly personality" and who has complex feelings toward her friend, Goro.
Haruka Tenoh (Sailor Uranus)	Sailor Moon	1991–97	A racecar driver dating a young violinist, shown to be Sailor Neptune. Haruka later reveals herself as Sailor Uranus and comes out as a lesbian.

== Comics ==
Characters	Title	Duration	Author	Notes
Sally Acorn; Bunnie Rabbot; Julie-Su; Belle D'Coolette	Sonic the Hedgehog	1992–2016	Ken Penders; Ian Flynn Michael Gallagher; Dan Slott; Karl Bollers Scott Fulop	Sally, Bunnie, Julie and Belle are all tomboys.
Beryl the Peril	The Topper / The Beezer and Topper / The Dandy	1953-2012	David Law	An assertive tomboy described by the cartoonist's daughter as "a female Dennis the Menace."
Betty Cooper	Archie Comics	1941–present	Bob Montana; John L. Goldwater	The tomboyish best friend of Veronica Lodge and love interest of Archie Andrews.
Cleopatra	Cleopatra in Space graphic novel series	2014–20	Mike Maihack	Cleopatra has been described as a "tomboy-ish 15 year-old girl."
Charlotte "Charlie"	The Witch Boy trilogy (Note: Consists of three books: The Witchy Boy (2017), The Hidden Witch (2018), and The Midwinter Witch (2019).)	2017–19	Lee Knox Ostertag	Charlie has been described as a tomboy who lives in a non-magical suburb.
Ivy the Terrible	The Beano	1938–present	Robert Nixon	A mischievous four-year-old girl.
Louise "Little Lulu" Moppet	Little Lulu	1935–present	Marjorie "Marge" Henderson Buell	A shrewd and whimsical tomboy.
Minnie the Minx	The Beano	1938–present	Leo Baxendale	A tomboy who was presented as a "female Dennis the Menace".
Patricia "Peppermint Patty" Reichardt	Peanuts	1950–2000	Charles M. Schulz	A tomboy shown to be exceptional in any sport she plays.
Tomboy	Cor!!	1970-1974	Pat Mills and John Wagner	An unruly schoolgirl similar to Minnie the Minx.
Toots	The Beano	1938–present	Leo Baxendale	The only girl in class 2B.
Valerie Smith	Josie and the Pussycats	1963–82; 1993; 2016–17	Marguerite Bennett; Cameron DeOrdio; Others	In the comics, Valerie is more tomboyish than her two bandmates. Besides being good at science and a skilled auto mechanic, she occasionally shows a quick temper as well as being physically stronger than she might appear.

== Film ==
Character	Title	Year	Actor	Notes
Addie Pray (née Loggins)	Paper Moon	1973	Tatum O'Neal	A tomboyish nine-year-old orphan who joins conman Moses Pray in his con schemes.
Amanda "Manny"	Manny & Lo	1996	Scarlett Johansson	A tomboyish 11-year-old girl who runs away with her sister from their foster home.
Amanda Lemmon	It Takes Two	1995	Mary-Kate Olsen	A young girl who meets her twin for the first time at summer camp and joins her in a scheme to matchmake their caregivers.
Amanda Wurlitzer	The Bad News Bears	1976	Tatum O'Neal	An 11-year-old pitcher who feels insecure about her tomboy image.
Annabel Andrews	Freaky Friday	1976	Jodie Foster	Annabel, a tomboy, annoyed with her mother, switches places with her for one day.
Becky "The Icebox" O'Shea	Little Giants	1994	Shawna Waldron	The tomboyish daughter of Danny O'Shea, an American football player.
Benio "Haikara-san" Hanamura	Haikara-San: Here Comes Miss Modern Part 2	2018	Saori Hayami (Japanese); Mimi Torres (English)	A young girl raised by a widowed father who acts "contrary to traditional Japanese notions of femininity."
Billie	Billie	1965	Patty Duke	A 15-year-old girl with a bobbed haircut, tomboyish behavior and passion for track running.
Billie Jean Davy	The Legend of Billie Jean	1985	Helen Slater	Billie is a tomboyish teen from Corpus Christi, Texas, who gains unwanted popularity.
Calamity Jane	Calamity Jane	1953	Doris Day	Calamity is a shotgun messenger to the Dakota Territory.
Carter Mason	Princess Protection Program	2009	Selena Gomez	Carter is a tomboyish teenage girl who lives in a small town in Louisiana.
Claire Fox	32A	2007	Riona Smith	One of the best friends of the protagonist.
Denise Fleming	Can't Hardly Wait	1998	Lauren Ambrose	Denise is the antisocial best friend of Preston Meyers.
Diana Guzman	Girlfight	2000	Michelle Rodriguez	A tomboyish Brooklyn teenager whose hot temper gets her into trouble at school as she repeatedly starts fights with other students.
Dinky Bossetti	Welcome Home, Roxy Carmichael	1990	Winona Ryder	The 15-year-old protagonist of the film who was adopted as a baby who has no interest in "feminine" things, such as makeup and nice clothing.
Edith	Despicable Me	2010–present	Dana Gaier	One of Gru's three daughters.
Ellie	Up	2009	Elizabeth Docter	A tomboyish girl who is a fan of adventurer Charles F. Muntz. She desires to move her "clubhouse" to a cliff overlooking Paradise Falls.
Enola Holmes	Enola Holmes; Enola Holmes 2	2020–present	Millie Bobby Brown	Enola, the younger sister of Sherlock, engages in activities such as jiujitsu, reading, science, and playing chess. Her mother encouraged this behaviour and always reassured her that she'd do very well on her own, thus raising a strong and independent girl.
Éowyn	The Lord of the Rings: The Two Towers; The Lord of the Rings: The Return of the King	2002–03	Miranda Otto	A young noblewoman of Rohan who calls herself a shield-maiden. She kills the Witch-King of Angmar in the Battle of the Pelennor Fields. According to film professor Sarah Kozloff, she symbolizes the tomboy/feminist archetype.
Frankie Addams	The Member of the Wedding (also the 1946 novel and adaptations)	1952	Julie Harris	Feeling rejected when her older brother goes off on his honeymoon without inviting her along, tomboy Frankie runs away from her middle-class Southern home.
Giulia Marcovaldo	Luca	2021	Emma Berman	A red-headed, independently-minded a bit of tomboyish girl with dreams of winning the Portorosso triathalon.
Graham Eaton	But I'm a Cheerleader	1999	Clea DuVall	A tomboyish girl at a conversion therapy camp who becomes friends with Megan and is more comfortable being gay than Megan. She is forced to come to the camp at the risk of being disowned by her family.
Hallie Parker	The Parent Trap (1998)	1998	Lindsay Lohan	A young girl who meets her twin for the first time at summer camp. The two are rivals before teaming up to reunite their parents.
Hayley Stark	Hard Candy	2005	Elliot Page	Hayley is a tomboyish 14-year-old who traps and tortures a 32-year-old photographer who she says is a sexual predator.
Imogene "Idgie" Threadgoode	Fried Green Tomatoes (also the 1987 novel)	1991	Mary Stuart Masterson; Nancy Moore Atchison	Tomboy Idgie is the youngest of the Threadgoode children, whom Ninny describes as her sister-in-law.
Jesminder "Jess" Kaur Bhamra; Juliette "Jules" Paxton	Bend It Like Beckham	2002	Parminder Nagra; Keira Knightley	Jess is the 18-year-old daughter of British Indian Sikhs living in Hounslow, London while Juliette "Jules" Paxton is the same age as her and the daughter of a white English family. Both are tomboys.
Jo Mitchell	Mean Girls 2	2011	Meaghan Martin (older Jo); Tatum Etheridge (younger Jo)	A tomboyish 18-year-old girl who shares an interest in cars with her father. She has a Vespa.
Julie Pierce	The Next Karate Kid	1994	Hilary Swank	A sullen orphan who is chosen by Mr. Miyagi as his next protege.
Juno MacGuff	Juno	2007	Elliot Page	Juno is a 16-year-old girl who is a "comfortable tomboy" and trusts people depending on what type of music they like.
Kate Libby (Acid Burn)	Hackers	1995	Angelina Jolie	Kate Libby, who goes by the handle "Acid Burn," is an edgy computer hacker.
Kit Keller	A League of Their Own	1992	Lori Petty (younger Kit); Kathleen Butler (older Kit)	A tomboyish pitcher on an all-girls baseball team.
Kristy Thomas	The Baby-Sitters Club (also the series of novels)	1995	Schuyler Fisk	Kristy is president of The Baby-Sitters Club and a tomboy.
Laure	Tomboy	2011	Zoé Héran	The story follows a 10-year-old gender non-conforming child, Laure, who moves to a new neighborhood during the summer holiday and experiments with their gender presentation, adopting the name Mikäel.
Leslie Burke	Bridge to Terabithia	2007	AnnaSophia Robb	Leslie is a tomboy and friend of Jess. Also see the 1977 novel.
Lola Bunny	Looney Tunes	1996–present	Various	According to author Kevin Sandler, Lola's personality is a combination of the Hawksian woman, tomboy, and femme fatale archetypes.
Margaret "Legs" Sadovsky "Goldie" Goldman	Foxfire	1996	Angelina Jolie; Jenny Shimizu	Legs is a teenage girl and drifter at Portland High School. She is a tomboy, as is her classmate Goldie. suspended from school along with Rita, Violet, and Maddie.
Mary Margaret "Maggie" Fitzgerald	Million Dollar Baby	2004	Hilary Swank	A determined, aspiring boxer trained by Frankie Dunn, who is also tomboyish.
Marjorie Winfield	On Moonlight Bay	1951	Doris Day	The grown tomboyish daughter of George and Alice, who lives in a small Indiana town in the 1910s with her trouble-making brother Wesley, and an exasperated housekeeper named Stella.
Mati	L'Animale	2018	Sophie Stockinger	Mati is an 18-year-old tomboy who struggles with gender identity and sexuality and is a member of a motocross gang in rural Austria.
May/C2SS2NDR2	RPG Metanoia	2010	Mika Dela Cruz	A neighborhood friend of Nico.
Princess Merida	Brave	2012	Kelly Macdonald (older Merida); Peigi Barker (younger Merida)	An adventurous and virtuous 16-year-old tomboyish princess.
Mikaela Banes	Transformers; Transformers: Revenge of the Fallen	2007; 2009	Megan Fox	A tomboyish girl whose father taught her everything she knows about cars and auto mechanic skills.
Miriam Mendelsohn	Turning Red	2022	Ava Morse	The Jewish-Canadian best friend of the protagonist.
Monica Wright	Love & Basketball	2000	Sanaa Lathan (older Monica); Kyla Pratt (younger Monica)	Monica is a tomboyish girl who aspires to become a professional basketball star and becomes romantically involved with Quincy McCall, who loves basketball as much as she does.
Mulan	Mulan; Mulan II	1998; 2004	Ming-Na Wen	Mulan takes her father's old armor and cuts her long hair, disguising herself as a man so that she can enlist in the army in lieu of her father.
Piper Pinwheeler	Robots	2005	Amanda Bynes	Piper is a feisty tomboyish yellow robot.
Riley Anderson	Inside Out	2015	Kaitlyn Dias	An 11-year-old tomboyish girl who loves hockey and her friends.
Roberta Martin	Now and Then	1995	Christina Ricci (younger Roberta); Rosie O'Donnell (older Roberta)	Roberta is the proclaimed tomboy of the girls, stemming primarily from her upbringing in a family consisting of her father and three older brothers, her mother having died in a car accident when she was four. As a girl, she tapes her breasts to flatten them, plays sports, and never hesitates to fight a boy.
Samantha "Sam" Stanton	Switching Goals	1999	Mary-Kate Olsen	Sam is a star soccer player and a tomboy; however, she wants to attract boys.
Samantha Swoboda	P.U.N.K.S.	1999	Jessica Alba	Samantha is Jonny's tomboyish cousin, a skilled car thief and lockpick.
Sarah Baker	Cheaper by the Dozen; Cheaper by the Dozen 2	2003; 2005	Alyson Stoner	One of the Baker children.
Jean Louise "Scout" Finch	To Kill a Mockingbird (also the 1960 novel)	1962	Mary Badham	A tomboyish young Scout and her pre-teen older brother Jem live in the fictional town of Maycomb, Alabama, during the early 1930s.
Susan Evers	The Parent Trap (1961)	1961	Hayley Mills	A young girl who meets her twin for the first time at summer camp. The two scheme to get their divorced parents back together.
Terri/Terry Griffith	Just One of the Guys	1985	Joyce Hyser	Terri Griffith is an aspiring teenage journalist in Phoenix who decides to disguise herself as a boy so her teachers will take her articles more seriously.
Tomboy Taylor	Mickey McGuire	1927-1934	Delia Bogard (1927-1933); Shirley Jean Rickert (1933-1934)	The only girl in the Scorpion Club.
Tommy Smith	The Tomboy	1924	Dorothy Devore	A tomboy who runs a boardinghouse in a village.
Toni Whitney	Andre	1994	Tina Majorino	Toni is a tomboy who nurses Andre back to health and they become devoted friends.
Vada Sultenfuss	My Girl	1991	Anna Chlumsky	Vada is an 11-year-old tomboyish girl living in Madison, Pennsylvania, during the summer of 1972.
Vanellope Von Schweetz	Wreck-It Ralph series	2012-2018	Sarah Silverman	A feisty young tomboy troublemaking "glitch."
Velvet Brown	National Velvet	1944	Elizabeth Taylor	A 12-year-old, horse-crazy girl who lives in the small town of Sewels in Sussex, England, and later participates in a horse race disguised as a boy.
Viola	She's The Man	2006	Amanda Bynes	Viola is a talented soccer player underestimated for being a girl, who dresses up as her brother Sebastian to play soccer at his boarding school.
Watts	Some Kind of Wonderful	1987	Mary Stuart Masterson	Watts, the tomboyish friend of Keith Nelson, who has been subjected to rumors that she is a lesbian, aspires to improve her social standing.

== Literature ==
Character	Title	Year	Author	Notes
Arya Stark	A Song of Ice and Fire series	1996–2011	George R. R. Martin	Arya is the third child and younger daughter of Lord Eddard Stark and his wife Lady Catelyn Stark. She is tomboyish, headstrong, feisty, and independent, and disdains traditional female pursuits. She is often mistaken for a boy.
Becky Landers	Becky Landers: Frontier Warrior	1926	Constance Skinner	A 15-year-old tomboyish girl who forms a plan in 1778 to join Captain George Rogers Clark.
Caddie Woodlawn	Caddie Woodlawn	1935	Carol Ryrie Brink	A lively eleven-year-old tomboy living in the area of Dunnville, Wisconsin in the 1860s.
Elizabeth Allen	The Naughtiest Girl series	1940-2001	Enid Blyton; Anne Digby	The main character of the Naughiest Girl series, Elizabeth is a spoiled and mischievous young girl who has been sent away to boarding school.
Elizabeth "Lizard" Flanagan	Lizard Flanagan series	1994–98	Carol Gorman	A 12-year-old girl who struggles with transitioning from being a tomboy to being more "girly."
Emerson "Em" Watts	Airhead trilogy	2008–10	Meg Cabot	The book is about a teenage girl whose life is forever changed by the tragic accident that leaves her taking the identity of a supermodel, Nikki Howard, and tries to let go of her tomboyish ways to take over Nikki's glamorous lifestyle.
Frankie Addams	The Member of the Wedding	1946	Carson McCullers	Frankie is a 12-year-old tomboy who feels disconnected from the world. Also see the 1952 film.
Georgina "George" Kirrin	The Famous Five series	1942–62	Enid Blyton	George is a tomboyish character who struggles with her gender.
Gypsy Breynton	Gypsy Breynton series	1866–67	Elizabeth Stuart Phelps	Gypsy goes from a tomboy to becoming a "selfless surrogate mother" to her brother.
Harriet M. Welsch	Harriet the Spy	1964	Louise Fitzhugh	Eleven-year-old Harriet M. Welsch is an aspiring writer who lives in New York City's Upper East Side.
Idgie Threadgoode	Fried Green Tomatoes at the Whistle Stop Cafe	1987	Fannie Flagg	Idgie is an unrepentant tomboy who had become reclusive. Also see the 1991 film.
Jamila "Brass Monkey" Sinai	Midnight's Children	1981	Salman Rushdie	Jamila is the younger tomboyish sister of Saleem and is shown to be a more skilled in fighting, riding bikes, and mischief.
Josephine "Jo" March	Little Women	1868–69	Louisa May Alcott	Jo is an aspiring writer and tomboy.
Katy Carr	What Katy Did	1872	Susan Coolidge	12-year-old tomboy Katy Carr lives with her widowed father and her two brothers and three sisters in Burnet, a small midwestern American town.
Laura Ingalls	Little House on the Prairie series	1932–43	Laura Ingalls Wilder	Laura, a tomboyish girl, lives with a settler and pioneer family on the prairie and later becomes an accomplished writer.
Leslie Burke	Bridge to Terabithia	1977	Katherine Paterson	Leslie is a "feisty tomboy" and friend of Jess. Also see the 2007 film.
Lyra Belacqua	His Dark Materials trilogy	1995–2000	Philip Pullman	Lyra is a wild 12-year-old tomboy who grew up in the fictional Jordan College, Oxford. She prides herself on her capacity for mischief, especially her ability to lie, earning her the epithet "Silvertongue" from Iorek Byrnison.
Martha "Mickey" Bradley	Meredith's Ann	1927	Elizabeth Gray Vining	Mickey is a young tomboy who dreams of being a boy.
Mick Kelly	The Heart Is a Lonely Hunter	1940	Carson McCullers	Mick Kelly is a tomboy who loves music and dreams of buying a piano.
Nan	Little Men	1871	Louisa May Alcott	A schoolgirl and friend of Daisy who is even more of a willful tomboy than Jo.
Nancy Blackett	Swallows and Amazons series	1930-1988	Arthur Ransome	A talented sailor and leader.
Pippi Longstocking	Pippi Longstocking series	1945	Astrid Lindgren	Pippi is red-haired, freckled, unconventional, and a superhumanly strong tomboy.
Rachel "Hellfire" Hotchkiss	Hellfire Hotchkiss	1967 (Note: Hellfire Hotchkiss was written in 1897, but not published until 1967.)	Mark Twain	Hellfire is the female counterpart to Oscar "Thug" Carpenter and was referred to by Twain as a tomboy.
Scout	To Kill a Mockingbird	1960	Harper Lee	A tomboy who lives with her older brother, Jem, and their widowed father Atticus, a middle-aged lawyer. Also see the 1962 film.
Topsy	Uncle Tom's Cabin	1852	Harriet Beecher Stowe	Topsy is a mischievous and rebellious young slave girl.
Tyke Tyler	The Turbulent Term of Tyke Tiler	1977	Gene Kemp	Tyke is an intelligent tomboy who is protective of her friend Danny and often gets into trouble.
Wilhelmine "Will" Elliot	An American Girl and Her Four Years in a Boys' College	1878	Olive San Louie Anderson	Will enrolls at a traditionally all-male college where her classmates are baffled by her short hair, masculine clothes, and bold demeanor.

== Plays ==
Characters	Title	Duration	Author	Notes
Anybodys	West Side Story	1957–2020	Arthur Laurents	Anybodys is a tomboy who informs the main characters that Chino has a gun and wants to enact revenge against Tony.
Ginger	Time Out for Ginger	1952–53 (Note: Time Out for Ginger played in the 1950s and 1960s.)	Ronald Alexander	Ginger is a tomboy and high schooler.
Linda	Blood Brothers	1983-1994	Willy Russell	Mickey's childhood friend and later wife.
Sandra	Pumpgirl	2006-2008	Abbie Spallen	A gas station worker in a rural town who falls in love with a married man.

== Television ==
Character	Portrayed by	Program	Duration	Notes
Ace	Sophie Aldred	Doctor Who	1963–present	Ace is a "streetwise tomboy" who likes pyrotechnics.
Alicia "Al" Lambert	Christine Lakin	Step by Step	1991–98	Al, middle child in the Lambert family, is a tomboyish, all-American girl, who later matures and softens.
Alexandra "Alex" Mack	Larisa Oleynik	The Secret World of Alex Mack	1994–98	Alex was considered a tomboy, with her character challenging gender norms.
Alex Russo	Selena Gomez	Wizards of Waverly Place	2007-2012	Alex is defined by her tomboyish, rebellious and lazy personality. She starts the series as more into layered shirts, sneakers and jeans while growing a more "boho-chic" style as the show continued on.
Alix Kubdel	Kira Buckland (English dub); Yukiko Morishita (Japanese dub); Adeline Chetail (French version; Season 1); Marie Nonnenmacher (French version; Season 2)	Miraculous: Tales of Ladybug & Cat Noir	2015–present	Alix is a tomboy and competitive student in Miss Bustier's class.
Allie Whoops	Lara Jill Miller	Curious George	2006-2022	George's fearless and exciteable friend who is always up for an adventure.
Angela Anaconda	Sue Rose	Angela Anaconda	1991–2001	Angela Anaconda is a tomboyish, imaginative, freckle-faced eight-year-old girl who eschews the femininity commonly associated with other girls her age.
Applejack	Ashleigh Ball	My Little Pony: Friendship is Magic	2010-19	Applejack is a farmer who thrives on farming, heavy physical labor, bucking apples and competing in athletic events or rodeos. (Note: In this forum, someone writes "Applejack and RD are tomboys. With Applejack being more of a country girl. Yes, they can act masculine at times because that's just their personality!)
Arya Stark	Maisie Williams	Game of Thrones	2011–19	Arya is a tomboyish, headstrong, feisty, independent, disdains traditional female pursuits and is often mistaken for a boy.
Ashley Funicello Spinelli	Pamela Adlon	Recess	1997–2001	Spinelli is a tomboy who has an extreme loyalty to her friends. She is temperamental at times and doesn't really like her first name because of it being associated with a quartet of snobbish girls all named Ashley.
Ariela	Samantha Dakin	Tree Fu Tom	2012-2016	Ariela is a "rough tough ranch running butterfly cowgirl" who is practical and loves the outdoors.
Assefa	Soleil Moon Frye	Planet Sheen	2010–13	Aseefa is a blue alien known for yodeling, and Sheen's romantic interest.
Baby Piggy	Melanie Harrison	Muppet Babies (2018)	2018-2022	Despite her outwardly girly girl appearance, Baby Piggy is "like a truck driver in a dress."
Becky Tyler	Molly Jones	Stepping Up	2012	A young tomboy who feels out of place at her new, all-girls' secondary school.
Betty Barrett	Tajja Isen	Atomic Betty	2004-2008	A 12-year-old girl who moonlights as the Galactic Guardian Atomic Betty.
Buttercup	E. G. Daily (What a Cartoon! episodes and 1998 original); Natalie Palamides (reboot)	The Powerpuff Girls (also the 2016 reboot)	1998–2005 (original); 2016–20 (reboot)	Buttercup is a "rough-and-tumble tomboy."
Sheriff Callie	Mandy Moore	Sheriff Callie's Wild West	2014-2017	Sheriff Callie is a tomboyish, sweet natured little cat who looks after the town of 'Nice and Friendly Corners,' the nicest and friendliest town in the west.
Cameron Howe	Mackenzie Davis	Halt and Catch Fire	2014–17	Cameron is a tomboyish woman in her twenties who has a knack for programming and loves punk rock.
Carissa	Tabitha St. Germain (English version); Fanny Bloc (French version)	Lolirock	2014–17	Carissa was drawn as a "fiery and tomboy warrior princess."
Choi Jadoo	Yeo Minjeong	Hello Jadoo	2011-2025	An outgoing and mischevious young girl.
Clementine	Brigid Tierney; Sophie Uretsky	Caillou	1997-2011	Caillou's adventurous friend.
Daniela "Danny" Rylant	Charly Ann Brookman (season 1); Hana Evans (season 2)	Chloe's Closet	2010-2014	Chloe's Scottish tomboy friend who is 4 years old. She prefers puddle jumping rather than playing with dolls and also loves preparing food. She's always up for an adventure, but can be a bit too competitive for her own good at times.
Darby	Chloë Grace Moretz	My Friends Tigger & Pooh	2007–2010	Darby is a six-year-old tomboy who is feisty and imaginative. She is Christopher Robin's friend and the leader of the problem-solving Super Sleuths along with Tigger, Pooh, and her puppy Buster.
Dawn Harper	Lizzy Greene	Nicky, Ricky, Dicky & Dawn	2014-2018	The oldest of the Harper quadruplets.
D.W. Read	Various	Arthur	1996-2022	The bratty younger sister of the titular character.
Darlene Conner	Sara Gilbert	Roseanne	1998–2018	Darlene is a tomboyish girl, which gives Roseanne a way she can "talkback to gender performance expectations."
Dot Warner	Tress MacNeille	Animaniacs (also the 2020 reboot)	1993–98 (original); 2020–23 (reboot)	Dot is the little sister of Yakko and Wakko, who she mimics in everything they do.
Dora Márquez	Various	Dora the Explorer	2000-present	Dora is a seven-year-old Latina girl, with a love of embarking on quests related to an activity that she wants to partake of or a place that she wants to go to.
Elly May Clampett	Donna Douglas	The Beverly Hillbillies	1962–71	Elly May is Jed's tomboyish and animal-loving daughter.
Elsa Dutton	Isabel May	1883	2021–present	The tomboyish daughter of James and Margaret Dutton.
Eve Baxter	Kaitlyn Dever	Last Man Standing	2011–21	Eve was originally a tomboyish girl who, according to Dever, became a "little more girly" as the series progressed.
Fifi Forget-Me-Not	Jane Horrocks	Fifi and the Flowertots	2005–2010	Fifi is a spirited tomboy.
Francine Frensky	Jodie Resther	Arthur	1996–2022	Francine is a tomboy who excels in soccer, baseball and basketball and enjoys horseback riding. She dislikes more feminine clothing, opting to wear a more traditional red sweater and jeans instead.
Gretchen	Melissa Altro	Camp Lakebottom	2013-2017	One of the three protagonists, Gretchen is oftentimes the voice of reason and excels in kung-fu.
Helga Pataki	Francesca Marie Smith	Hey Arnold	1996-2004	Helga is a 9-year-old rough and cynical girl who puts on a mean-spirited, rude, deceitful, and tomboyish front. She is often portrayed as the local bully and as Arnold's arch-rival yet love interest.
Jennifer Keaton	Tina Yothers	Family Ties	1982-89	Third child and second daughter of Elyse and Steven. She cares mostly about athletics. She hews more closely to her parents' liberal views than to her siblings' conservative views. She is aggressive but sweet. She is jealous at first of Andy, but grows to care for him.
Jennifer "Jen" Masterson	Megan Fahlenbock	6teen	2004–10	Jen is a tomboy who loves sports and wants to a snowboarder in the Olympics.
Joanna Marie "Jo" Polniaczek	Nancy McKeon	The Facts of Life	1979–88	Early in the series, many of Jo's stories revolved around her tomboyish ways.
Kimi Watanabe-Finster	Dionne Quan	Rugrats	1991-present	Chuckie's adventurous, playful stepsister (later his adopted sister in the seventh-season episode "Finsterella")
K.C. Cooper	Zendaya	K.C. Undercover	2015–2018	K.C. is a tomboy who dislikes traditionally girly things and wears more traditional, plaid clothing. She's a black belt in karate and prefers studying over partying.
Lana Loud	Grey DeLisle	The Loud House	2016–present	Lana is the fourth-youngest Loud sibling who loves to get dirty, especially with mud. She is also a skilled handy worker, plumber, and mechanic who loves animals.
Lilly Truscott	Emily Osment	Hannah Montana	2006–11	Lilly is Miley Stewart's extroverted, athletic, and optimistic best friend. Over the course of the series, she embraces her feminine side.
Lor MacQuarrie	Grey DeLisle	The Weekenders	2001-2004	Lor is a bossy, yet well-intentioned tomboy on the verge of discovering her feminine side.
Louise Belcher	Kristen Schaal	Bob's Burgers	2011–present	Louise is the younger Belcher child who enjoys pranking, lock-picking and action/horror films. She dislikes girly things like sleepovers, romance, dolls, fairies and makeup.
Lynn Loud Jr.	Jessica DiCicco	The Loud House	2016–present	Lynn is the fifth-oldest Loud sibling who loves to play sports.
MacKenzie "Mac" Coyle; KJ Brandman; Tiffany "Tiff" Quilkin	Sofia Rosinsky; Fina Strazza; Camryn Jones	Paper Girls	2022	Mac is headstrong, temperamental, and protective of her fellow paper girls. KJ is a jock who dislikes anything considered girly and, in 2019, is hiding her lesbian relationship from her family. Tiff is scientifically- and technologically-minded and is often the voice of reason and problem-solver in the group.
Princess Macy Halbert	Erin Mathews	Nexo Knights	2015-2017	Macy is a fierce fighter who serves as a knight, as well as princess of the realm.
Madison "Maddie" Rooney	Dove Cameron	Liv and Maddie	2013-17	Maddie is the exact opposite of her girly twin sister Liv as she's a competitive, athletic basketball star who prefers high tops, jerseys and hoodies over high fashion and makeup.
Mandy Flood	Sarah Hadland (2005-2007); Su Douglas (2008-2020); Ayesha Antoine (2021-present); Lily Cassano (US; 2014-2020)	Fireman Sam	1987–present	Mandy is an adventurous girl who is best friends with Norman.
Martha Monkey	Susan Sheridan (UK; 1992-1999); Lynne Griffin (US; 1998-1999); Kathleen Barr (US; 2002); Joanna Ruiz (UK; 2002-2006)	Noddy's Toyland Adventures and Make Way for Noddy	1992-2000; 2002-2006	A mischievous and bossy tomboy.
Mary-Kate Burke	Mary-Kate Olsen	Two of a Kind	1998–99	Mary-Kate is a tomboy who wants to perfect her curveball.
Maurecia	Denise Oliver	Wayside	2007–08	A student at Wayside.
Maxine "Max" Mayfield	Sadie Sink	Stranger Things	2016–25	Max is Billy's stepsister, an avid skateboarder, and the tomboy of the group who catches the attention of both Lucas and Dustin.
Michelanne "Mike" Mazinsky	Nika Futterman	Mike, Lu & Og	1999-2001	Mike is an 11-year-old Manhattan-born girl who enjoys the features of the tropical island.
Agent Olive	Dalila Bela	Odd Squad	2014-16	Olive is a highly serious, logical and determined agent who is an avid sports fan (mainly the Burly Bears basketball team) and loves reading comic books but despises princesses and requests for pants over skirts.
Peg	Hayley Faith Negrin	Peg + Cat	2013-2018	Peg is a young girl who wears a red hat and a blue dress.
Penelope "Punky" Brewster	Soleil Moon Frye	Punky Brewster	1984–88	Punky is a "spunky seven-year-old tomboy."
Pipsqueak	Tajja Isen	The ZhuZhus	2016–17	Pipsqueak is a hamster who is "all tomboy" and a "firecracker."
Plum Pudding	Ashleigh Ball	Strawberry Shortcake's Berry Bitty Adventures	2010-15	Plum is athletic, sporty and energetic jokester who runs a dance studio.
Polly Plantar	Amanda Leighton	Amphibia	2019-2022	Polly loves weapons, violence, fighting, spitting and heavy machinery, often finding Anne's "girl time" activities boring and restrictive.
Rainbow Dash; Scootaloo	Ashleigh Ball; Madeleine Peters	My Little Pony: Friendship Is Magic	2010–19	Rainbow Dash is an athletic pony with rainbow-striped hair. Her friend Scootaloo is also a tomboy.
Raspberry Torte	Greer McKain (2006 film); Haley Hyden-Soffer (2006-08)	Strawberry Shortcake	2003-2008	In this version of the franchise, Raspberry is defined by her rough and tough demeanor as well as sarcastic and outspoken; she loves fitness, runs a sports gym and cares more about staying active.
Red Riding Hood / Wonder Red	Various	Super Why!	2007-2016	Red is a sassy, bold, tomboyish girl who loves rhyming and rollerskating.
Ronnie Anne Santiago	Breanna Yde (2016-2018); Izabella Alvarez (2019-present)	The Loud House/The Casagrandes	2016-present	Ronnie Anne is the 11-year-old (12 as of The Casagrandes Movie) sister of Bobby, a tough tomboy who enjoys skateboarding, playing video games, and pranks.
Rosie	UK: Teresa Gallagher (2009–12); Nicola Stapleton (2017–20); US: Jules de Jongh (2009–12); Nicola Stapleton (2017–20); Other: Rachael Miller (2020; Thomas' Magical Birthday Wishes and Learning with Thomas)	Thomas & Friends	1984–2021	Rosie is a tomboy tank engine.
Sam Puckett	Jennette McCurdy	iCarly; Sam & Cat	2007–2012; 2013–14	Sam is an unapologetic, sarcastic tomboy who co-hosts the iCarly webshow. She is Carly's best friend and Freddie's "frenemy" and later girlfriend. In Sam & Cat, Sam moves to Los Angeles with Cat Valentine and starts running their babysitting job.
Sassette Smurfling	Julie McWhirter (voice)	The Smurfs	1985–1989	Sassette is an "adolescent tomboy" smurf.
Sathya	Ayesha	Sathya	2020–present	Sathya is a free-spirited, trustworthy, brave tomboy who marries a man named Prabhu.
Skeeter	Howie Mandel; Frank Welker; Cree Summer	Muppet Babies (1984 and 2018	1984-1991 (original); 2018-2022	Scooter's sister, Skeeter was originally conceived as the foil to Miss Piggy/Baby Piggy.
Stephanie	Julianna Rose Mauriello (Series 1–2, LazyTown Extra); Chloe Lang (Series 3–4)	LazyTown	2004-2014	An active, energetic, and confident young girl.
Stephanie "Stevie" Lake	Sophie Bennett (2001-2003); Lauren Dixon (2008-2009)	The Saddle Club	2001-2009	Lisa and Carole's best friend and part of the Saddle Club.
Stephanie Tanner	Jodie Sweetin	Full House	1987-1995	The middle child in the Tanner family.
Toph Beifong	Michaela Jill Murphy (voice, 2006-2011); Kate Higgins and Philece Sampler (voice, The Legend of Korra); Dionne Quan voice, Avatar Aang: The Last Airbender); Vivian Vencer (voice, 2022-present, video games)	Avatar: The Last Airbender	2006–present	Toph is an independent, belligerent, and direct tomboy who joins the main cast in season 2. She grew up as the heiress of the wealthy Beifong estate and but rejected her feminine upbringing for a life as a gruff earthbender who competed in fighting matches before joining the Avatar on his quest.
Tyne	UK: Carina Reeves; US: Jessica McDonald	Chuggington	2008-2021	A lively and fearless orange train who specializes in demolition.
Ursula	Britt Irvin	George of the Jungle	2007-2008	A tomboyish city girl who came to live in the jungle with George and his friends along with her father Dr. Scott.
Velma Dinkley	Various	Scooby-Doo	1969–present	A main member of Mystery Incorporated.
Wendy Corduroy	Linda Cardellini	Gravity Falls	2012-2016	Wendy is laidback and down to earth who wears a lumberjack flannel shirt, jeans and hat.
Zoe	Fran Brill (1993–2015); Jennifer Barnhart (2016–present)	Sesame Street	1969–present	Elmo's friend.

== Video games ==
Characters	Title	Year	Notes	Developer
Ace	Mario Tennis: Power Tour	2005	One of the two main characters the player can choose from, Ace is a technical tennis player.	Nintendo
Tsarevna Alena	Dragon Quest IV: Chapters of the Chosen	1992–2016	Tsarevna is a "fierce tomboy" who likes to fight and go on adventures.	Spike Chunsoft
Arle Nadja	Puyo Puyo	1991–present	A cheery girl who's somewhat of a tomboy.	Sega
Ashei	The Legend of Zelda: Twilight Princess	2006	Ashei is a skilled sword fighter and stronger than most men.	Nintendo
Amy Rose	Sonic the Hedgehog	1993–present	Energetic tomboy who has a crush on Sonic.	Sega
Baiken	Guilty Gear series	1998	Baiken is a fighter who can use a variety of weapons, such as a katana, mace, and fireworks cannon, within the sleeve of her severed arm.	Arc System Works
Bianca	Dragon Quest V: Hand of the Heavenly Bride	1992-2016	Bianca was a bit of a tomboy in her youth. She has grown up to be a kind and gentle woman. But she still makes daring moves here and there.	Spike Chunsoft
Bombette	Paper Mario	2000-2014	A pink Bob-omb who is one of Mario's partners who appears in Paper Mario.	Nintendo
Princess Daisy	Mario	1989–present	Daisy is cheerful and energetic, and is often depicted as Luigi's love interest.	Nintendo
Dixie Kong	Donkey Kong	1995–present	The tomboy of the family, Dixie has the ability to jump higher than them all.	Nintendo
Kumatora	Mother 3	2006	Kumatora is the heir to the Ooshe castle and is described as a "tomboy princess."	Brownie Brown; HAL Laboratory
Makoto	Street Fighter series	1999–2008	Makoto is a young Japanese woman who utilizes her family's dojo teachings of Rindo-kan karate as her fighting style.	Capcom
Misty	Pokémon	1996–present	Misty is Cerulean City's gym leader and one of Ash Ketchum's best friends.	The Pokémon Company
Narumi Mishima	12Riven	2008	Narumi is one of the protagonists of the game and works as police officer.	KID; Cyberfront; SDR Project
Chie Satonaka	Persona series	1996–2020	Chie is an upbeat tomboy who is obsessed with kung fu.	Atlus
Shantae	Shantae	2002–present	Guardian Genie of Scuttle Town whose main fighting style includes whipping her long hair.	WayForward
Sonshōkō	Koihime Enbu	2016	Sonshōkō is a spirited and vivacious tomboy.	UNKNOWN GAMES; M2 Co., LTD
Touko Zaizen	Inazuma Eleven 2 Kyoui no Shinryakusha	2009	Touko is a tomboy.	Level-5
Ryune Zoldark	Super Robot Wars	1991–2015	The sixteen-year-old daughter of Bian Zoldark.	Winkysoft; Banpresoft; B.B. Studio; Bandai Namco Entertainment
Wendy O. Koopa	Mario	1988–present	Part of Bowser's Koopa Troop.	Nintendo
Caesar King	Zenless Zen Zero	2024–present		HoYoverse/miHoYo

== See also ==
- Effeminacy
- Geek girl
- Gender
- Gender variance
- Sissy
