= Elizabeth Phelps =

Elizabeth Phelps may refer to:

- Elizabeth "Bella" Phelps (1820–1893), British philanthropist, educator, and promoter of Madeira embroidery
- Elizabeth Stuart Phelps Ward (1844–1911), early feminist American author and intellectual
- Elizabeth Porter Phelps (1747–1817), diarist from Hadley, Massachusetts
- Elizabeth Wooster Stuart Phelps (1815–1852), American writer
- Elizabeth Phelps (20th century), American fashion designer and co-founder of Phelps Associates
- Elizabeth A. Phelps, professor of neuroscience
