= Schleusner =

Schleusner is the surname of several people:

- Johann Friedrich Schleusner (1759–1831), German theologian
- Luke Schleusner (born 1979), American football coach
- Thea Schleusner (1879–1964), German painter
- Vin Schleusner (1908–1979), American football player
