= Silent partner =

Silent partner or Silent Partner(s) may refer to:

- Silent partner (business), one who shares in the profits and losses of a business, but is not involved in its management

== Film and television ==
- The Silent Partner (1917 film), an American silent film drama produced by Jesse Lasky
- The Silent Partner (1923 film), an American silent film drama produced by Famous Players–Lasky
- The Silent Partner (1931 film), an American silent film drama directed by Roy Mack
- The Silent Partner (1939 film), an Italian drama film directed by Roberto Roberti
- The Silent Partner (1978 film), a Canadian crime film directed by Daryl Duke
- Silent Partner (1944 film), an American thriller film directed by George Blair
- Silent Partner (2001 film), an Australian film directed by Alkinos Tsilimidos
- Silent Partner, a 2005 film starring Tara Reid and Nick Moran
- "The Silent Partners", a 2010 episode of The Venture Bros.

== Literature ==
- The Silent Partner (novel), an 1871 historical novel by Elizabeth Stuart Phelps Ward
- Silent Partner, a 1989 Alex Delaware novel by Jonathan Kellerman
- Silent Partner, a 2003 novel by Stephen Frey
- Silent Partner, a 2007 memoir by Dina Matos, former First Lady of New Jersey

== Music ==
- The Silent Partner (soundtrack), from the 1978 film
- The Silent Partner, a 2016 album by Havoc and The Alchemist
- "Silent Partner", a 2014 song by La Roux from Trouble in Paradise
- "Silent Partners", a 1984 song by Laura Branigan from Self Control
- "Silent Partners", a 1984 song by David Frizzell and Shelly West

== Other uses ==
- Silent Partner (climbing), a piece of climbing equipment
