= Elizabeth Wooster Stuart Phelps =

American writer

Elizabeth Stuart Phelps
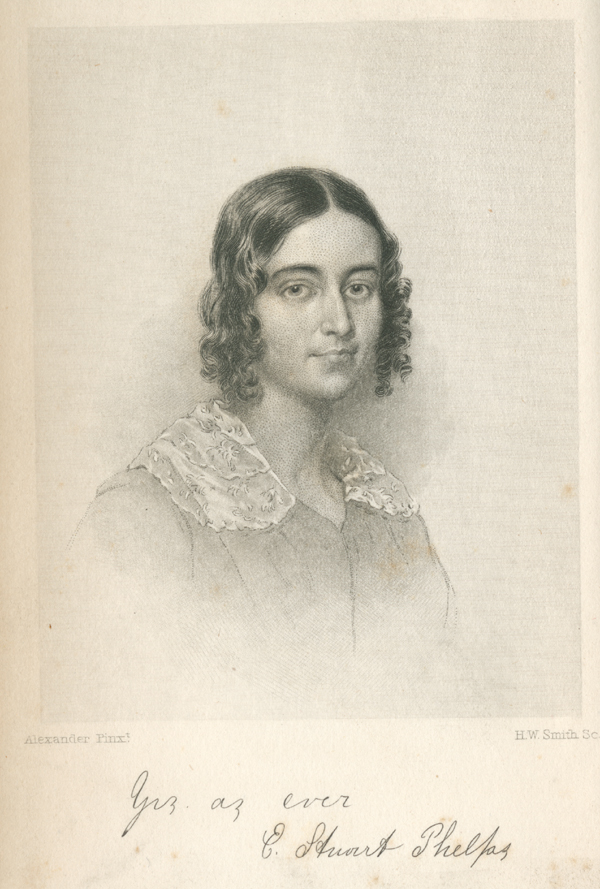
- Born: August 13, 1815; Andover, Massachusetts, US
- Died: November 29, 1852 (aged 37)
- Pen name: H. Trusta
- Occupation: Writer
- Language: English language
- Children: including Elizabeth Stuart Phelps Ward

Elizabeth Wooster Stuart Phelps (1815–1852) was an American writer of religiously themed articles, adult domestic fiction and books for children. She wrote eleven books as well as numerous articles and stories that were translated and published in many languages, and probably many more works that appeared anonymously. Phelps wrote "at the beginning of the transition in American women's writing from domestic sentimentality to regional realism" and was "among the earliest depicters of the New England scene, antedating the regional novels of her Andover neighbor, Harriet Beecher Stowe". In addition to being one of the earliest known authors to have penned a fiction series specifically for girls, her writing also focused on the burdens on women in their restrictive roles as mothers and wives. Her much anthologized 1852 semi-autobiographical short story, "The Angel Over the Right Shoulder", illustrates the repressive burdens frustrating a wife's creative ambitions and need to "cultivate her own mind and heart". The story is notable as "one of the rare woman's fictions of this time to recognize the phenomenon of domestic schizophrenia", says literary critic Nina Baym.

Her only daughter and eldest child, the writer Elizabeth Stuart Phelps Ward, noted that her creative and talented mother was "torn" by an internal "civil war" between a woman's calling as caretaker of others and as a creative artist and thinker in her own right. "The struggle killed her", reflected Ward, "but she fought till she fell."

== Early life ==
Phelps was born in Andover, Massachusetts on August 13, 1815, to Moses Stuart and Abigail (Clark) Stuart. Her father was a prominent professor of Sacred Literature at Andover Theological Seminary where he is credited with pioneering modern biblical study in America. He was an anti-abolitionist Christian and he wrote an influential scriptural justification for slavery and for the deportation of black people to Africa in the 1850 pamphlet "Conscience and the Constitution". On her mother's side, the family tree led back to John Winthrop, the English Puritan lawyer and Governor of the Massachusetts Bay Colony. She was also childhood friends with author Harriette Newell Woods Baker, also born in Andover, with whom she started a writing society to read each other's work.

In 1829, at the age of 14, Phelps was among the first class of students to attend the newly opened Abbot Academy, one of the nation's first residential high schools for girls. In 1832, she subsequently enrolled in Boston's Mount Vernon School under the tutelage of its principal Reverend Jacob Abbott, a prolific writer and editor whose works include the popular Rollo books and Lucy books for children. Phelps lived in the Abbott household for two years and while there published her first writings under the pseudonym H. Trusta (an anagram of Stuart) in Abbott's periodical, The Religious Magazine.

After completing her education, Phelps returned to Andover in 1834 suffering from chronic health problems including partial blindness, headaches, and even temporary paralysis. She was diagnosed with a "cerebral disease" or "brain fever" that plagued her for the remainder of her life, possibly a result of that battle she struggled with to comply with what her daughter later termed "the relentless drudgery of domestic toil" while yearning to express her full intellectual and creative mind.

== Adult life ==
She returned to Boston and married Austin Phelps in 1842. Now a prominent minister's wife at the Pine Street Church in Boston, Phelps gave birth to her first child, a daughter baptized Mary Gray (who would adopt her deceased mother's name and become a famous writer in her own right), and lived for six reportedly happy years. In 1848, her husband accepted a position at Andover Theological Seminary alongside his father-in-law, Moses Stuart. In 1849, Phelps began writing the Kitty Brown books, a four-volume religious series, penning one volume per year. After Phelps' death just four years later, Reverend Phelps acknowledged his wife's "foreboding" regarding Andover's oppressiveness for women ("Memorial", p. 74). In those four years, Phelps gave birth to two more children, Moses and Amos, and became a bestselling author with the 1851 publication of The Sunny Side; or, The Country Minister's Wife. The novel sold 100,000 copies in its first year, eventually more than 500,000, and garnered international recognition.

Elizabeth Wooster Stuart Phelps died in Andover on November 30, 1852. Phelps is buried in Phillips Academy Cemetery of Andover, Massachusetts.

== Bibliography ==
- Little Kitty Brown and Her Bible Verses. (1851)
- Kitty Brown and Her City Cousins. (1852)
- Kitty Brown and Her Little School. (1852)
- Kitty Brown Beginning to Think. (1853)
- The Sunny Side and a Peep at Number Five. (1853)
- The Sunny Side; or, The Country Minister's Wife. (1851)
- A Peep at Number Five; or, A Chapter in the Life of a City Pastor. (1852)
- The Angel over the Right Shoulder; or, The Beginning of a New Year. (1852)
- The Tell-Tale; or, Home Secrets told by Old Travellers. (1853)
- Little Mary; or, Talks and Tales for Children. (1854)
- The Last Leaf from Sunnyside. (1853)
