= A Singular Life =

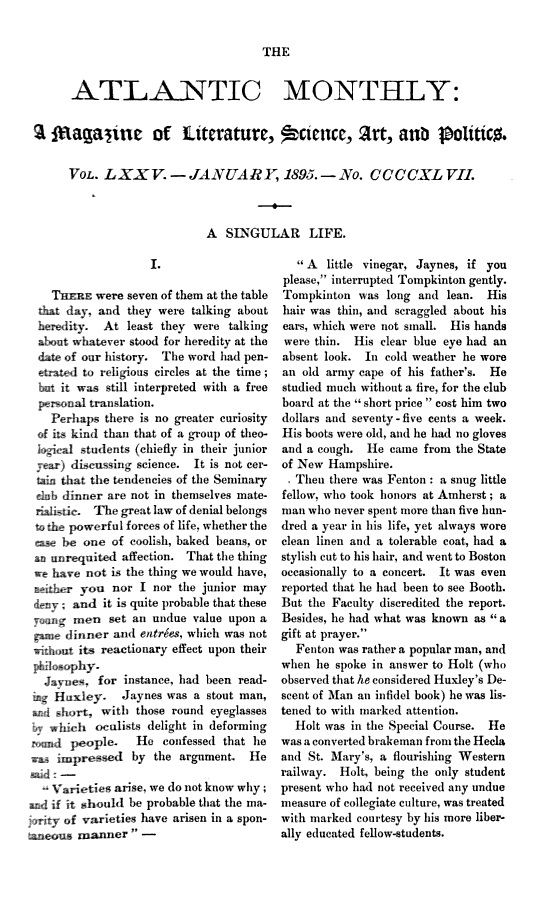
First chapter of A Singular Life as it appeared in The Atlantic Monthly, January 1895

A Singular Life is a novel published in 1895 by Elizabeth Stuart Phelps Ward. It was first published in serial form in The Atlantic Monthly from January through October 1895, and published in novel form in late 1895. It was the fourth highest best-selling book in the United States in 1896.

== Analysis ==
The book was published in a period when Americans were exploring how the teachings of Jesus Christ could be applied to daily life. Several books considering the question were published in 1890s. A Singular Life, in this vein, features a protagonist named Emanuel Bayard who pursues Jesus-inspired humanitarianism by forsaking ties to his orthodox church. Among Bayard's projects is positively influencing a prostitute named Magdalena (or "Lena") to become more respectable and use her talent for singing for a better purpose. When he suggests she pursue a new career, specifically household service, she balks and refuses the stereotypical domestic role and instead works for a gunpowder factory.

Ward's books, including A Singular Life and her previous books like The Story of Avis, depicted attempts at social utopias as she demonstrated a focus on women's needs and a hope that men and women could live together equitably.

One of Ward's favorite novels among her many, the story follows a young minister who promotes temperance in a small fishing town. The town of Gloucester, Massachusetts was believed to be the model for the setting, and prompted a local attorney to pen a pamphlet titled Gloucester Vindicated.
