= Chloe's Closet =

Animated children's television series

- Genre: Children's television series
- Created by: Sarah Finn (concept); Mike Young (concept, uncredited)
- Developed by: Jeff Gordon (season 2)
- Directed by: Gary Hurst (season 1); Jeff Gordon (season 1); Ben Choo (season 2)
- Theme music composer: Rick Mulhall
- Opening theme: "Dress Up Time", performed by Eleanor Webster (uncredited)
- Ending theme: "Dress Up Time" (Instrumental)
- Composers: Rick Mulhall; Ian Nicholls
- Countries of origin: United States (season 2); United Kingdom (season 1)
- Original language: English
- No. of seasons: 2
- No. of episodes: 52 (104 segments)

Production
- Executive producers: Mike Young; Paul Cummins; Edward de Jager; Sebastian Debertin; Bill Schultz (season 1); Bethan Cousins (season 1); Michael Schaack (season 1); Thomas Walker (season 1); Volkert Struycken (season 1); Joy Thomas (season 1); Vincent Chen (season 1); Philip Lifu Wu (season 1); Orlando V. Verde (season 1); Adam Mimnagh (season 1); Nicolas Atlan (season 2); Stan Adam (season 2); Low Houi Seong (season 2); Mahmut Lpsirli (season 2)
- Producers: Jeff Gordon (season 1); Marie Cecchino-Brand (season 1); Siobhán Ní Ghadhra; Lolee Aries (season 2)
- Editors: Michael Bradley (video; season 1, episodes 1–2); Paulo Jorge Rodrigues Marques (video; season 1, episodes 3–52); Brian Newton (animatic; season 1); Richard Finn (season 2)
- Running time: 22 minutes (11 minutes per segment)
- Production companies: MoonScoop Entertainment (Note: Known as Mike Young Productions during season 1.); Telegael Teoranta; European Film Partners (season 1); Wales Creative IP Fund (season 1); Trickompany Filmproduktion (season 1); Kids Workout Factory (season 2); Minika (season 2)

Original release
- Network: PBS Kids Sprout (United States); CITV/LittleBe (United Kingdom); KiKA (Germany)
- Release: July 12, 2010 – February 9, 2014

Chloe's Closet is an animated children's television series produced by American company MoonScoop Entertainment and Telegael Teoranta. The series is mainly aimed for children aged 2–8 years old.

The show premiered in the United States on PBS Kids Sprout on July 12, 2010, later airing in the United Kingdom on CITV, Cartoonito, LittleBe, and Australia on ABC.

== Plot ==
The adventures of a young girl (Chloe) and her friends (Tara, Jet, Danny, Riley, Lillian, Mac and Carys) and her toys (Lovely Carrot, Wizz and Soggy) as they go on magical adventures while playing dress-up in her closet in her room.

== Characters ==
- Chloe Corbin (voiced by Eleanor Webster) is the main protagonist of the series. She is a Welsh 4-year-old girl with a very big imagination. She's created her own imaginary world that she and her friends regularly use when playing dress-up and having adventures in a closet in her room, and has designs on being a historian. Chloe has a very kind heart and is always up for adventure. Her catchphrases are "Lollipops!", "Pickles!", "Anything is possible in my world.", "Not in my world.", "They are in my world!", and "Anything can happen in my world."
- Lovely Carrot (voiced by Paul Tylak) is a plush toy and security blanket that Chloe owns, and is her imaginary friend. He's a small yellow blanket, with a toy duck head attached. In Chloe's imaginary world, Lovely Carrot comes to life. He's always trying to help Chloe out and look after her, but he can be a bit of a klutz. He is a very brave, friendly and gentle gentleman. His catchphrases are "No worries!" and "Flying feathers!"
- Tara Jansen (voiced by Siobhán Ní Thuairisg) is Chloe's best friend who is a redheaded Irish girl. Being half a year older than her friends, she considers herself to be older and wiser. Sometimes, Tara can be a bit bossy and usually tries to take charge on adventures. She never quite seems to get that's Chloe's job, though.
- James "Jet" Horton (voiced by Oisín Kearns) is Chloe's English best friend who is male. He usually tries to turn play time towards more boyish games, but is always there to help her out. He has a crush on Danny.
- Daniela "Danny" Rylant (voiced by Charly Ann Brookman in season 1 and Hana Evans in season 2) is Chloe's Scottish tomboy friend who is 4 years old. She prefers puddle jumping rather than playing with dolls and also loves preparing food. She's always up for an adventure, but can be a bit too competitive for her own good at times.
- Riley Harris (voiced by Derry McCafferey) is Chloe's friend who is a Black British boy.
- Lillian "Lil" McGwire (voiced by Jasmine Belson) is Chloe's friend who is also Welsh. She loves more girly activities. She tends to criticize herself a lot and sometimes needs to be convinced to give new things a try.
- Marcus "Mac" McGwire (voiced by Daniel Keogh in season 1 and Lola Davies in season 2) is Lillian's younger brother. He's still learning to talk, but usually manages to get the point across. Mac looks up to his sister and the two tend to get along fairly well.
- Carys Mozart (voiced by Anna Webster) is Chloe's friend who is also a Welsh 4-year-old girl and she likes ponies. She only appeared in season 2.
- Hootie-Hoo is Chloe's toy owl.
- Soggy is Chloe's toy frog.
- Wizz is Chloe's mechanical toy dog.
- Regina "Gina" Corbin (voiced by Teresa Beausang) and Paul Corbin (also voiced by Paul Tylak) are Chloe's parents who appear at the end of the episodes.

Dan Russell, Jade Yourell and Emma Tate provide voices for additional guest characters in almost every episode.

== Episodes ==
=== Season 1 (2010–11) ===
Note: All episodes of this season were directed, and in the case of episode 1, storyboarded, by Gary Hurst and Jeff Gordon, and starting with episode 33, the remaining few episodes of this series were written in duos, or, in the case of episodes 48 and 52, in trios.

No.	Title	Written by	Original U.S. air date
1	"Bump in the Night" / "Rainbow Riddle"	Sindy McKay	July 12, 2010; July 13, 2010
Chloe's Stuffed owl Hootie-Hoo keeps bumping his head. Chloe and Jet visit outer space to dust the stars so Hootie-Hoo can see better at night.; Chloe, Tara and Jet don rain gear to play in the rain and soon discover the rainbow is missing. Together they must find the seven colors and return them to the sky.
2	"Monkeys of the Caribbean" / "The Color Pink"	Marie Davis; Nigel Crowle	July 15, 2010; July 15, 2010
Chloe, Tara and Riley help a band of pirates sort their treasure. They also help them learn that "treasure" should be used and enjoyed, not buried!; The kids visit a Queendom where all the pink paint has been destroyed by a dragon. The kids are able to mix up their own pink paint using white and red.
3	"Jet's Quest" / "Getting to Snow You"	Siwan Jobbins	July 16, 2010; December 10, 2010
Jet doesn't know what to do for the show that Chloe is staging. But a jungle cruise, a group of monkeys, and a mischievous snake show Jet that he can dance!; The kids, Chloe, Lil and Tara visit a land of ice and snow where they discover Mr. Cloud has lost his snowflake-cutter so the snow is dropping in big blobs instead of delicate flakes.
4	"Braking Away" / "The Sound of Echoes"	John Sinclair; Ebi Naumann	July 12, 2010; July 14, 2010
Chloe, Tara and Jet must navigate a fantastical race course by following the directional words on a map.; Chloe, Danny and Riley visit the mountains of Bavaria to help Mr. Echo understand the idea of sequencing to help him repeat back sounds in the right order.
5	"Eight Left Feet" / "Sun Daze"	Meinir Lynch; Siwan Jobbins	July 13, 2010; July 15, 2010
Chloe and her friends, Lil and Mac, dress up as deep sea divers and travel under the sea... where they ride a dolphin and help an octopus appreciate the benefits of having eight arms.; Chloe, Danny and Tara visit a fairy land that is always light. It turns out the Sun has lost his "comfort blankie" and can't sleep without it.
6	"Bump in the Sand" / "On the Right Track"	John Sinclair; Bedwyr Rees	August 31, 2010; July 16, 2010
Chloe, Lil and Mac travel to the desert of Arabia where they meet a lost camel. With the help of some low crocodiles and a high Sphinx, they lead him safely home.; A frustrated train can't pull his heavy load up a steep hill. Chloe, Danny and Jet show him that by splitting the load into two parts, he can make it light enough to pull up the hill.
7	"Do Little, Do Big" / "Hey, Hey! He's a Monkey!"	John Sinclair	July 17, 2010; July 18, 2010
Chloe and Jet become veterinarians and treat everyone from the smallest mouse to the biggest dinosaur called John Jacob Jingleheimer Schmidt.; Chloe, Tara and Riley go for a scavenger hunt in the jungle, with a new friend who is new to the jungle as well. But they're not sure whether a coconut is found at the top of a tree or the bottom.
8	"Purple Like Me" / "Super Best Friends"	Marie Davis; Nigel Crowle	July 19, 2010; July 20, 2010
Chloe, Tara and Danny travel undersea as mermaids and find all the fish travel in pairs. When they come upon one who is alone, they set out to find her perfect match.; Chloe, Tara and Jet encounter a "King Kong" type gorilla who is wreaking havoc because he has the hiccups.
9	"Little Big Boy" / "Easy as Cake"	Siwan Jobbins; Marie Davis	July 21, 2010; July 22, 2010
An adventure takes Jet and Chloe to a Native American village where they play 'snap' to help create a pretty Totem Pole.; Danny has a song stuck in her head (If You're Happy and You Know It) and she cannot stop singing it, but Chloe brings her to a winter bakery where they help a Chef make a cake for his son's birthday, and make rocking musical instruments in the process! The episode ends with her Mom bringing Chloe and Danny to the park.
10	"Stay on Your Toes" / "Big Shoes to Fill"	Siwan Jobbins; John Sinclair	July 23, 2010; July 24, 2010
Lil can't remember the correct sequence for the steps of her dance. A music box ballerina helps her decipher the repeated pattern of the steps.; When the new Ring Master's assistant accidentally mixes all the circus acts props up, it's up to Chloe, Jet, Danny and Riley to sort it out and save the special children's performance!
11	"All Green Thumbs" / "Tyrannosaurus Wrecks"	Marie Davis; Siwan Jobbins	July 25, 2010; July 26, 2010
Chloe, Riley, Lil and Mac have fun making things grow with water but when they overgrow a mouse, she's too tall to get inside her home and reach her babies. They enlist Mac who's short enough to help.; Dressed as cave kids, Chloe and Jet travel to Dino Land. While there, with the help of some rolling fruit, they help their new friend Dino find his missing Dino egg.
12	"Brushing Around" / "For Love of Monet"	John Sinclair; Marie Davis	July 27, 2010; July 28, 2010
Chloe and Tara are thrilled to meet the Tooth Fairy, but she's lost her bag of rewards! Now they only have one night to find it before the children of the world wake up!; Chloe plays teacher to Jet, Lil and Mac but the magical closet lets them paint pictures that come to life, but forget to give their stick-man the ten fingers he needs to hold the handlebars so he can join them on a bike ride.
13	"Hairy Tale" / "Raiders of the Lost Egg"	Siwan Jobbins; Gloria Thomas	July 29, 2010; July 30, 2010
Chloe and Jet go to Jack and the Beanstalk land and, with the help of the woodcutter, help the Giant get a good night's sleep.; The kids travel to the Mayan Ruins to meet a parrot with a problem. With the help of a cheeky monkey, they solve the puzzle and save the day.
14	"Best in Snow" / "Leave It to the Beavers"	Anna-Lisa Jenaer; Roger Stennett	December 20, 2010; July 31, 2010
Scout the St. Bernard puppy cannot find his way home. So Chloe and Jet help him find his home as skiers.; A river that runs through the forest has dried up, leaving the forest animals high and dry. Chloe and Riley must solve the mystery of the dry river.
15	"In the Fix" / "Follow the Castle's Brick Road"	John Sinclair; Siwan Jobbins	August 1, 2010; August 2, 2010
Chloe, Tara and Jet become handymen and are called to fix Mother Nature's run-down cottage.; Chloe and Tara help a wizard regain his magical powers by finding his magic cone hat.
16	"Icing Escapades" / "Extra Special Delivery"	Mark Young; John Sinclair	August 3, 2010; August 4, 2010
The Winter Wonderland celebration comes to a grinding halt when the Royal Chef bakes the biggest cake ever, but can't get it out of his bakery. So Chloe and Tara as ice skaters help him take the cake to the Winter Queen.; Chloe, Danny and Jet have to deliver a new magic lamp to Mrs. Genie, but they accidentally use up its three wishes!
17	"To Borrow, to Borrow" / "Get Your Kicks"	Siwan Jobbins; Nigel Crowle; Ebi Naumann	August 5, 2010; August 6, 2010
Chloe and Tara become fairies and help out a slightly befuddled Owl to ensure that story time in the Forest is never canceled again.; Chloe and Jet cheer up Tess, an unhappy giant tortoise on an island in the Seychelles, by getting her to play a 'fruitful' game of soccer with them.
18	"Smoke Alarmed" / "These Boots are Made for Jumping"	Marie Davis; Ebi Naumann	August 7, 2010; August 8, 2010
Chloe and her friends, Jet and Tara, explore all the elements of being fire fighters, and even put out a fire in their own backyard!; Chloe and Tara help a horse named Mandy learn the joy of succeeding on your own, without the help of "magic" shoes.
19	"Crowing Up" / "On Frozen Pond"	Mark Young; Anna-Lisa Jenaer; Ebi Naumann	August 9, 2010; December 22, 2010
When Chloe, Lovely Carrot and Riley are left in charge of a vegetable garden they have to keep a flock of troublesome birds from eating all the vegetables!; Chloe and Jet help out a couple of penguins who are playing a very strange game of ice hockey!
20	"The Great Banana Caper" / "The Good, the Bad, and the Silly"	John Sinclair; Marie Davis; Ebi Naumann	August 10, 2010; August 11, 2010
Someone is taking fruit from the fruit shop overnight. Chloe and her friends become police officers to find the surprising culprit!; The kids become cowhands, moving a herd of cows across the open range.
21	"Clock a Doodle Doo" / "Those Wonderful Toys"	John Sinclair; Siwan Jobbins; Ebi Naumann	August 12, 2010; August 13, 2010
No one has any milk for their breakfast because the farmer is still asleep. Chloe, Jet and Tara discover that Mr. Cock-a-Doodle-Doo has overslept because he forgot to wind his alarm.; The kids help an inventor discover the joy of a simple toy.
22	"Try Away Home" / "Listen Up"	Marie Davis; John Sinclair; Ebi Naumann	August 14, 2010; August 15, 2010
When a little bird boards the plane, he's very nervous. Together, Lil, Chloe and Lovely Carrot help the little bird overcome his fear of flying.; Chloe and her pals, Jet and Riley, help a trainee wizard pass her broomstick driving test, which is going to be difficult as she can't tell left from right!
23	"Don't Fall a Sheep" / "Blankie and a Net"	Anna-Lisa Jenaer; John Sinclair; Ebi Naumann	August 16, 2010; January 10, 2011
Chloe, Lil and Mac have to look after a flock of mischievous sheep who keep escaping!; Chloe, Jet and Danny go to the beach and take on the unbeaten volleyball champions, but she finds a new friend who's a secret weapon!
24	"He's Got Rhythm" / "Ticket to Squaresville"	Anna-Lisa Jenaer; Robin Hughes; Gloria Thomas; Ebi Naumann	August 17, 2010; August 18, 2010
Chloe, Tara and Danny help Olaf the Octopus discover his musical talent.; Chloe, Jet and Tara travel to Square Town where the inhabitants have a problem. Local Supervillain Square Man has turned everything into a square. Chloe persuades him that things are better when they are the correct shape.
25	"Fancy Footwork" / "No Body's Perfect"	Nigel Crowle; Anna-Lisa Jenaer; Ebi Naumann	August 19, 2010; September 13, 2010
The girls, Chloe, Tara and Lil, step in when a flamenco-dancing flamingo hurts her leg.; Lil and Mac join Chloe as doctors and nurses to help fix broken toys. In the process, they discover that being different can be fun!
26	"Old Rabbit, New Tricks" / "Pre-School Musical"	John Sinclair; Robin Hughes; Gloria Thomas; Ebi Naumann	August 20, 2010; August 21, 2010
It's raining outside and Chloe is left all alone with Lovely Carrot; then the closet is turned on as they fill in for a missing magician, but when they start having trouble with their props, they don't realize that their act is being sabotaged!; Chloe and Jet start out as a pop star duo but find out that the more the merrier when it comes to having fun!

=== Season 2 (2013–14) ===
The development for the second season took place from October 2011–October 2012, and production took place from Fall 2012–Spring 2013. Episodes 1 through 18 all had a copyright date of 2012 in the credits, and episodes 19 through 52 all have a copyright date of 2013 in the credits (although the copyright date of the former year remained to be in use in some countries). In addition to this, most of the episodes in this season were written by one writer, with the exception of episode 52, being the first and only episode in this season to be written in duos.

Note: All episodes of this season were directed by Ben Choo, with Bob Doucette serving his role as a supervising director.

No.	Title	Written by	Original U.S. air date
1	"We Ought to Be in Movies" / "A New Way to Play"	Sindy McKay	July 27, 2013; July 28, 2013
Chloe, Tara, and Jet are going to a big movie premiere but discover that Chloe's gorilla co-star is too self-conscious about his size to attend with them.; Chloe, Riley, and their new friend, Carys, become zookeepers and they help a T-Rex who wants to play baseball with the other animals in the zoo.
2	"Amid the Pyramids" / "Eggs in a Basket"	Mark Young; Dev Ross	August 3, 2013; August 4, 2013
The Great Pyramid is missing and Chloe and friends, with a little help from some local Egyptian animals, must locate it.; Chloe, Riley, and Jet play basketball and help a strange 'Bounsie McBirdal' mama bird find her lost egg.
3	"Banding Together" / "The Sleeping Princess"	Guy Toubes; Kati Rocky	August 10, 2013; August 11, 2013
Chloe, Riley and Danny are building a cardboard house for Lovely Carrot when the closet lights up. They become a marching band and help a giant parade balloon to float so it can be in the parade.; Chloe, Tara and Lil want to play a different game of hide and seek; but as the closet pipes up they awaken a sleeping princess and keep her awake so that she can attend her ball.
4	"To Bee or Not to Bee" / "Pizza Party"	Rochelle Perry; Douglas Wood	August 17, 2013; August 18, 2013
Chloe, Carys and Tara are having a pretend shop when the closet lights up; they become pixies and travel to a land of flowers to help a Little Bee be happy doing little things.; When a frazzled restaurant owner/chef oversleeps, Chloe, Danny, Jet and Lovely Carrot must somehow appease her important guests: an Ostrich Mayor and her husband. After that, Danny fixes her messed-up daytime picture and shows it to her friends and Chloe's mom.
5	"A-Camping We Will Go" / "Faster than a Speeding Ostrich"	Jill Cozza-Turner; Siwan Jobbins	August 23, 2013; August 24, 2013
Chloe, Danny and Tara encounter a "scary monster" while camping, but he turns out to be a very small, very loud bullfrog!; It's a very special day in the Serengeti: Master and Miss Giraffe are getting married. Chloe and her friends join in and help make it a very special day for another one of Serengeti's animals.
6	"A Nose for Tennis" / "Fiesta"	Guy Toubes; Dev Ross	August 31, 2013; September 1, 2013
Lil is scared to go to her gymnastics class. Chloe suggests bringing her to her world where they help "Mr. Machine" (a nervous tennis ball machine) unclog a jam so they can play tennis.; Chloe, Tara and Jet attend a fiesta and they help a chef learn how to sort peppers so her soup isn't so spicy hot.
7	"The Big Friendly Wolf" / "Hip Hop Hijinks"	Sindy McKay; Mark Young	September 7, 2013; December 28, 2013
Chloe (as Little Pink Riding Hood) and Jet help Granny find the Big Friendly Wolf, who is reluctant to ask for help collecting berries for the lunch he always shares with Granny.; Chloe, Lil and Mac visit a storybook kingdom where dancing is forbidden, as their disabled monarch cannot walk and is assisted by a wheelchair.
8	"Fashion Fantasy" / "Catch of the Day"	Scott Gray; Jill Cozza-Turner	September 14, 2013; September 15, 2013
Chloe, Tara and Lil become artists and create "wearable art" dresses for an art contest, but can they create matching hats too, in time for the big show?; Chloe, Tara and Lil are pretending they are in outer space and they are looking for blocks to build their own rocket ship but they realize that all the toys in their drawer are all mixed-up. The closet brings them underwater as mermaids and they befriend a variety of sea creatures. When a big storm displaces their new friends, Chloe and the gang must sort the fish to get them back to their homes.
9	"I Scream for Ice Cream" / "The Tale of the Mixed-Up Dragon"	Larry Swerdlove; Siwan Jobbins	September 21, 2013; September 22, 2013
Chloe and Jet are playing pirates on a rainy day and Carys wants to play soccer; but the closet brings them to a county fair where they sell ice cream; then they help a height-challenged penguin who is not tall enough to ride a roller coaster.; Chloe and Jet are having a pretend hiking adventure when the closet sparkles; they are in a storybook kingdom as princess and knight and they meet a dragon who can't remember what the different kinds of fruit look like.
10	"Seeing is Believing" / "The Treasure of Talky Mountain"	Douglas Wood; Scott Gray	September 28, 2013; September 29, 2013
Chloe becomes an ophthalmologist (with Tara and Carys as her nurses) and she helps a far-sighted spider improve her vision so she can play games with her friends.; Chloe, Riley and Jet are cowhands in the Old West and they try to follow a map... to a hidden treasure!
11	"Turtle Fishing" / "A Super Sticky Situation"	Guy Toubes; Jill Cozza-Turner	October 5, 2013; October 6, 2013
Chloe, Riley and Carys go fishing; they help a mother turtle to find her newly hatched babies.; The Super Friends must save a carnival from a destructive pair of giant lobsters but Riley can't seem to get used to his new, sticky powers.
12	"Horse on a Wire" / "A Giant Problem"	Jill Cozza-Turner; Kati Rocky	October 12, 2013; October 13, 2013
When Chloe and her friends visit a horse ranch, Tara decides to give a horse a makeover before the big rodeo. The horse may look pretty, but she's more comfortable being herself.; Chloe, Jet, Danny and Riley (as soccer athletes) help a group of Hedgehogs communicate with a Giant, and get him to stop ruining their fun.
13	"Musical Chairs" / "Three Pigs' Party"	Rochelle Perry; Guy Toubes	October 19, 2013; October 20, 2013
Chloe, Lil and Mac travel to an Indian jungle where they help Miss Elephant learn how to play gentler with her smaller friends.; Chloe and Jet are playing restaurant (as the chef and waiter) when the closet begins to light up. In storybook land, Chloe and Jet become builders as they help the 3 Little Pigs build a house so that they can host a birthday party. Upon returning to Chloe's room, Jet begins to apologize to Carys about taking his favorite red ball as she thought it was an apple.
14	"Konichiwa Chloe!" / "Dance, Leprechaun, Dance"	Douglas Wood; John Sinclair	October 26, 2013; October 27, 2013
Chloe, Tara and Carys travel to Japan and they help a kitten get to Hani Matsuri (Doll Festival) so she can spend time with her friend who moved far away.; Chloe, Tara and Jet are playing a game of jump rope when the closet lights up. They travel to Ireland and they help a young leprechaun learn a magic dance that will turn his pot to gold.
15	"The Art of Making Friends" / "Stone Age Story"	Scott Gray; Guy Toubes	November 2, 2013; November 3, 2013
Chloe, Jet and Tara visit Ancient Greece to help convince a worried Pegasus to stay still so an artist can carve a statue of it.; Chloe and Jet are playing a board game when the closet lights up. In the Stone Age, they help Mr. Bat clean up his cave-store so they can help Mr. Mammoth finish his invention... a catapult.
16	"A Magical Dust-Up" / "Winged Rider"	Mark Young; Dev Ross	December 8, 2013; December 14, 2013
There's trouble in Fairyland when the official Fairy Duster falls ill and all of the magic dust is depleted. Chloe, Danny and Tara must resupply the magical ingredient!; Chloe and Riley are learning how to tie their shoes and Tara teaches them to do it; the closet brings them to Argentina as gauchos and they help a flightless bird do what it always wanted to do... herd cattle.
17	"The High Flying Four" / "Turn on the Lights"	Scott Gray; John Sinclair	November 9, 2013; November 10, 2013
Chloe, Tara, Danny and Carys become acrobats in Africa and they must help the performers doing a show at a local "watering hole" learn to get along.; Chloe and Jet are planting seeds in their small garden when the closet sparkles; they travel to Russia and they meet a sable who can't wait to see the lovely Northern Lights. They help him pass the time and their patience is rewarded with an amazing light show!
18	"Race for Fun" / "Flower Power"	Guy Toubes; Jill Cozza-Turner	November 16, 2013; November 17, 2013
Chloe and Carys help prepare Tortoise for a roller skating race against Hare.; Chloe, Tara and Carys are drawing pictures when the closet brings them to the Netherlands to watch the tulips bloom but a grumpy gnome has cast a spell to block the sun! Upon returning to Chloe's room; they anticipate about riding the rollercoaster.
19	"Grouchy Pandas, Giggling Dragon" / "We Figured It Out!"	Larry Swerdlove; Scott Gray	November 23, 2013; November 24, 2013
Chloe, Lil and Mac travel to China and help a pair of pandas figure out why a little dragon keeps taking their table tennis balls.; Chloe, Riley and Carys are playing with robots when the closet lights up. They wear fancy animal costumes and must help a behind-schedule giraffe prepare for his big costume party.
20	"Cloudberry Cakes" / "Beautiful Butterfly"	Siwan Jobbins; Dev Ross	December 15, 2013; December 7, 2013
Chloe, Jet and Tara travel to Norway and meet a shy Nisse with a special talent.; Chloe, Tara and Carys help a caterpillar find a lost friend who has turned into a butterfly.
21	"Singing at Sea" / "Sing a Special Song"	Scott Gray; Jill Cozza-Turner	January 4, 2014; January 5, 2014
Chloe, Jet and Carys become sailors and they help a sea monster realize his dream of singing with beautiful mermaids.; Chloe, Danny, Tara and Jet are preparing a birthday party for Chloe's dad when the closet lights up. They become a popular singing group and the audience eagerly awaits them, but the Pop Mobile causes trouble.
22	"Twinkle Twinkle Missing Star" / "A Samba Success"	Douglas Wood; Eric Shaw	January 11, 2014; January 12, 2014
Chloe and Jet help a lion constellation find the fallen star that was once his tail.; Chloe, Lil and Mac visit Brazil and they help a Pretty Parrot regain her confidence so she can fly.
23	"Sinnie's Boo-Boo" / "A Root Awakening"	Guy Toubes; Jill Cozza-Turner	January 18, 2014; January 19, 2014
Danny is holding a concert when Chloe's closet begins to sparkle. They along with Jet go to Scotland where they use their veterinary skills to help local animals, including reluctant Sinnie the Sea Serpent of the Loch, who has a boo-boo on her tail! Back in Chloe's room, they resume the preparations for Danny's concert (Jet plays the drums, Chloe plays the kazoo then her parents become the audience).; Chloe, Tara and Riley are making vases with clay when the closet lights up. The three children become gardeners; Tara also learns a lesson in patience when she tries to use magic to make sunflowers grow faster... with disastrous results!
24	"Forest Photo Fun" / "Chugga Chugga Choo Choo"	Scott Gray; Dev Ross	January 25, 2014; January 26, 2014
Wildlife photographers Chloe and Riley take pictures of rare animals for a wildlife magazine.; Chloe and Jet problem solve to help Little Train make his deliveries on time.
25	"Camp Chloe" / "Budding Ballerinas"	Guy Toubes; Douglas Wood	February 1, 2014; February 2, 2014
Chloe, Riley & Carys are arguing whether they would play either bowling or soccer. The closet brings them to camp where they become camp counselors and help a new camper fit in.; Chloe and Tara help an inexperienced floral ballerina named Rosa discover her own role in a ballet. She eventually plays the harp in the presentation when the assigned flower hurts her hand she couldn't play it.
26	"Clowning Around" / "A Princess Party"	Scott Gray; Eric Shaw; Sindy McKay	February 8, 2014; February 9, 2014
Chloe, Carys and Jet become clowns at the opening of a new playground, but end up having to watch the kids when the babysitter gets a stomachache.; Chloe, Carys and Tara help a Queen have the best birthday party ever!

== Development ==
Mike Young and his daughter Sarah Finn conceptualized the show in fall 2004. Finn's eldest daughter (Chloe Cheshire, born January 2003, now a filmmaker), inspired the main protagonist of the series. Production for the first season was green-lit in mid-2007 and began in 2008 when German broadcaster KiKA and Dutch-based European marketing and sales organization European Film Partners strike a deal with Mike Young Productions. Overseas animation was provided by Neon Pumpkin Animation Studios for the 2007 pitch pilot, Animation Dimensions, Shanghai Supercolor Technology Co., China Digital Entertainment Productions, Toon City Animation, and Huminah Huminah Animation for season 1, and Vision Animation for season 2.

== Broadcast ==
The show premiered in Asia through Playhouse Disney as early as 2010.

In 2011, the series was purchased by France 5 and Playhouse Disney in France, PBS Kids Sprout in the United States, Cartoonito in Italy, Channel One in Russia, KiKA in Germany, CITV/LittleBe in the United Kingdom, both Disney Channel and Playhouse Disney in Spain, and CBeebies in Latin America. Within that time, Turner Broadcasting System Europe acquired the British cable rights to the series for it to air on their Cartoonito channel for broadcast in the Summer of 2011.

The series also aired on TVOKids in Canada, TVNZ in New Zealand, Sat.1 in Germany, Hop! Channel in Israel, SAM - BTV11, ANT - BPTV3, An Viên - BTV9 in Vietnam, and Yle TV2 in Finland.
