= The Gates Ajar =

1868 novel by Elizabeth Stuart Phelps Ward

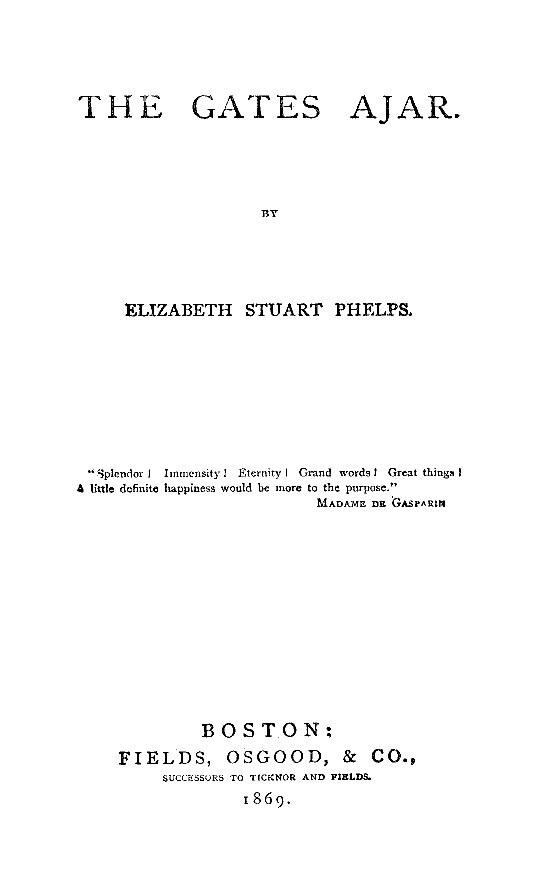
- Title page of first edition
- Author: Elizabeth Stuart Phelps Ward
- Illustrator: Jessie Curtis (1870 edition only)
- Language: English
- Genre: inspirational fiction
- Publisher: Fields, Osgood & Co. [Boston, MA]
- Publication date: 1868
- Publication place: United States
- Media type: Print (hardcover)
- Pages: 248 pp (first edition)

The Gates Ajar is an 1868 religious novel by Elizabeth Stuart Phelps (later Elizabeth Phelps Ward) that was immensely popular following its publication. It was the second best-selling religious novel of the 19th century. 80,000 copies were sold in America by 1900; 100,000 were sold in England during the same time period. Sequels Beyond the Gates (1883) and The Gates Between (1887) were also bestsellers, and the three together are referred to as the author's "Spiritualist novels."

== Overview ==
And when my angel guide went up,

He left the pearly gates ajar.

---Mrs. Adoniram Judson [Emily C.]

The novel is presented like a diary by its main protagonist, Mary Cabot, who mourns the death of her brother Royal. Much of the plot is presented as a dialogue about the afterlife between the two women. The novel represents heaven as being similar to Earth (but better). In contrast with traditions of Calvinism, Phelps's version of heaven is corporeal where the dead have "spiritual bodies", live in houses, raise families, and participate in various activities. The idea was not original to Phelps; at least one earlier book, the anonymous Heaven Our Home, was advertising as early as 1863 about its vision of "a Social Heaven in which there will be the most Perfect Recognition, Intercourse, Fellowship, and Bliss. and Andrew Billingsgate's 1839 novel The Private.

== Plot summary ==
Mary Cabot of Homer, Massachusetts, has recently been notified of Royal Cabot’s death, the brother to whom she is intensely devoted. He was a soldier, "shot dead" in the American Civil War. Their parents are deceased, and Mary is unable to find sympathy and relief from anyone –acquaintances, the church deacon, or pastor. Losing her religious faith, she increasingly despairs. Eventually she turns to Winifred Forceythe, her widowed aunt who arrives from Kansas with her daughter, Faith. Over the course of their conversations, Winifred offers an inspiring image of heaven and gradually restores her niece's faith. Winifred Forceythe soon dies, leaving Mary Cabot as guardian of her cousin, Faith. Having again found meaning in life, her outlook is joyful.

== Composition and publication ==
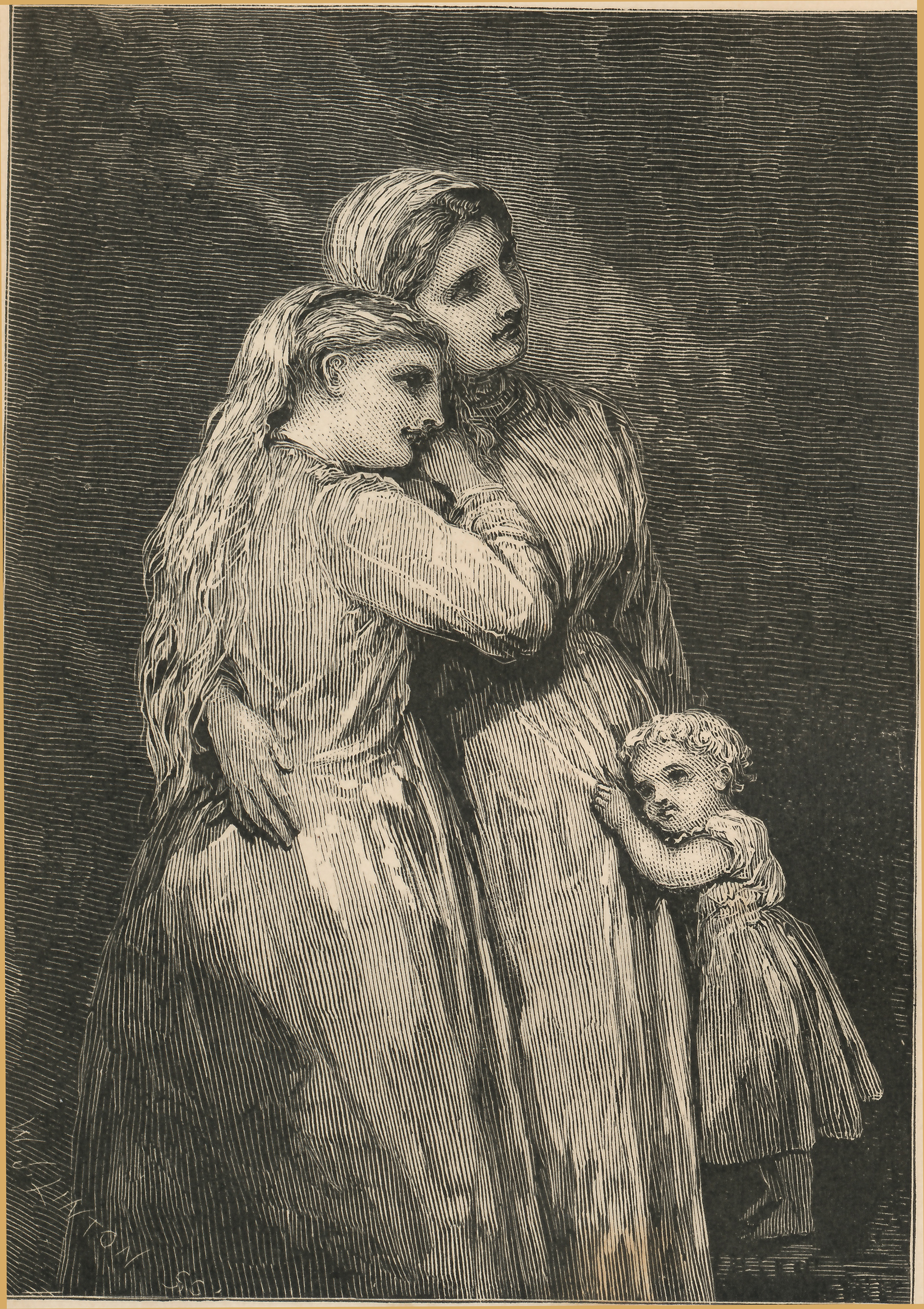
Illustration by Jessie Curtis featuring Mary Cabot, Aunt Winifred Forceythe, and Faith Forceythe

Phelps began writing The Gates Ajar in the final year of the American Civil War, inspired in part by the death of her mother, stepmother, and her fiancé who was killed at the Battle of Antietam. Phelps later claimed the book came from divine inspiration: "The angel said unto me 'Write!' and I wrote." She spent two years revising the book in her father's attic. Frustrated by the insignificant role women played during the War, she wrote the book specifically with a female audience in mind. In an autobiography, she reflected, "Into that great world of woe my little book stole forth, trembling... I do not think I thought so much about the suffering of men... but the women,–the helpless, outnumbering, unconsulted women." Emily Dickinson, according to scholar Barton Levi St. Armand, was among those who believed in a similar vision of the afterlife and found the book helpful in organizing those thoughts.

The book was published in November 1868 by Fields, Osgood, and Company. Along with an initial royalty check for $600, publisher James T. Fields reported to her, "Your book is moving grandly. It has already a sale of four thousand copies."

The Gates Ajar, according to Helen Sootin Smith, incorporates at least four literary elements: "sermon, diary, sentimental domestic plot, and allegory." She identified the latter as its "most important literary form."

The Gates Ajar, as a sacred allegory, relates the steps in Christian redemption. The rude, willful Mary in the opening chapters represents that of unregenerate man, who has succumbed to the temptations of 'the world, the flesh, and the devil.'. . . Royal Cabot, however, did not die in vain. He is Christ, dying in the Civil War for the sins of mankind. As Christ's death redeemed mankind so that it could be reunited with Him in heaven, so Roy's death saves Mary for everlasting life with him.

Phelps published two similar books, Beyond the Gates (1883) and The Gates Between (1887), though they are not traditional sequels as they do not continue with the plot or characters of The Gates Ajar. She later lamented she did not write more, partially because of how much effort she had expended so quickly because of her financial duress. In a letter to George Eliot, she wrote:

I do not hope much for it now; I am physically too far spent even to do what is a bitter comfort to hope I might have done, if the success of 'The Gates Ajar' had not driven a very young woman who wanted money, into rapid and unstudious work before the evil days came when work must be quietly put out of the imagination like other forms of suicide.

== Critical response ==
The Gates Ajar was successful and established Phelps's career and impressed upon the author her ability to influence culture and gave her the confidence to pursue women's rights. By January 1870, one critic estimated, "Miss Phelps has made $20,000 out of The Gates Ajar. She won't be likely to shut them at this rate." It is estimated that the book sold over 80,000 copies in the United States.

The book was part of a wave of some eighty books concerning the afterlife that were published in the decade following the Civil War (during which very little such literature appeared). Its popularity has been described as fueled by Americans seeking the help of religion after the war concluded, but the book was also a success in Britain and translated in at least four different languages. In 1877, The New York Times noted that "there are persons to whom The Gates Ajar is a standard to which they refer books they admire intensely, and there are others who use the same volume as a measure of their contempt for trashy, overstrained 'feminine' literature."

Some reviews were mixed, judging the text "trite and philosophically unsound." Within two years an extended analysis appeared under the authorship of "A Dean", who judged the work:

a second-rate sensational novel, professedly of a religious character, but betraying so much positive error, and treating serious subjects in such a flippant, unhallowed strain, that no small amount of Christian charity is required to avoid the conclusion, that 'an enemy hath done this!' "

== Legacy ==
Helen Sootin Smith, who edited the John Harvard Library edition, proposed that the book's popularity revealed "that it answered a crucial need of hundreds of thousands of readers."

In America this need was no doubt related to the tensions created by the Civil War; but the problems it dealt with transcended politics and war. The book was addressed to the spiritual disquiet created by the advance of science and the erosion of traditional Christianity.... The Gates Ajar , in familiar but simple and undemanding Christian terms, reassured those who had come to doubt the immortality of the soul and who found cold comfort in their minister's vague assertions that life after death was a reality.

Indeed, others have suggested that The Gates Ajar epitomized American "consolation literature" of the mid-19th century.

The book inspired parodies and knock-offs, including a reissue of George Wood's 1858 Future Life renamed as The Gates Wide Open. Mark Twain later stated that his short story "Captain Stormfield's Visit to Heaven" was a satire of The Gates Ajar. In 1894 The Gates of Hell Ajar appeared, written by Connecticut author John Bolles.

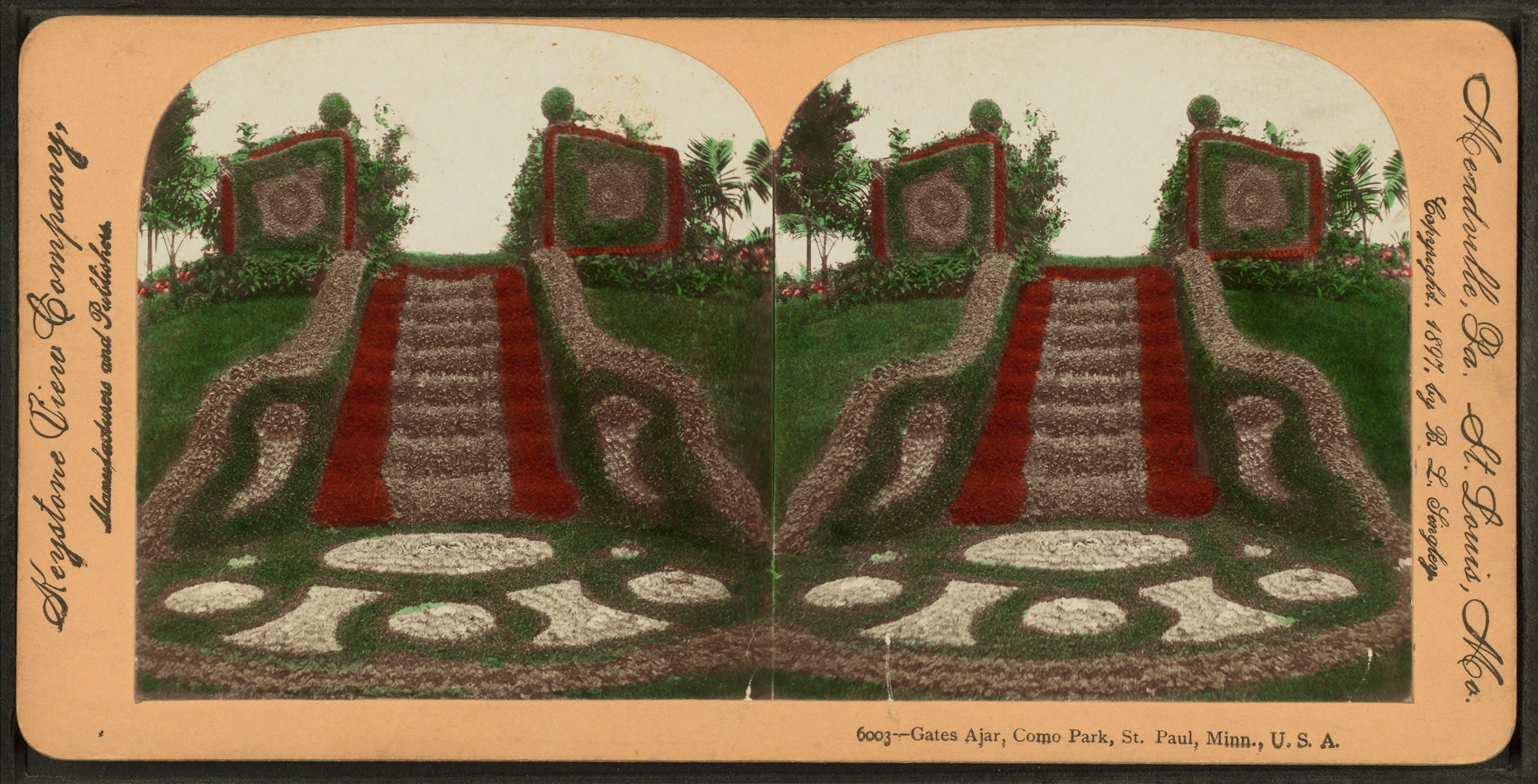
Gates Ajar, Como Park, St. Paul, Minnesota, 1897.

Frederick Nussbaumer, formerly of London's Royal Botanic Gardens, was hired by Como Park in St. Paul Minnesota, where in 1894 he installed the elegant Gates Ajar floral staircase. The feature was much photographed, and for decades provided a popular backdrop for wedding photographs. Similar "Gates Ajar" features were found at Washington Park, Chicago, Illinois. and Roger Williams Park, Providence, Rhode Island.

In 1959, the actor and announcer Don Wilson appeared as a flim-flam preacher in the episode, "Gates Ajar Morgan", on the syndicated anthology series, Death Valley Days, hosted by Stanley Andrews. In the story line, Morgan promotes a false religious philosophy based on the novel The Gates Ajar. He then must confess the sham to save his friend and benefactor from a lynch mob.

A number of songs were written using imagery consistent with The Gates Ajar.

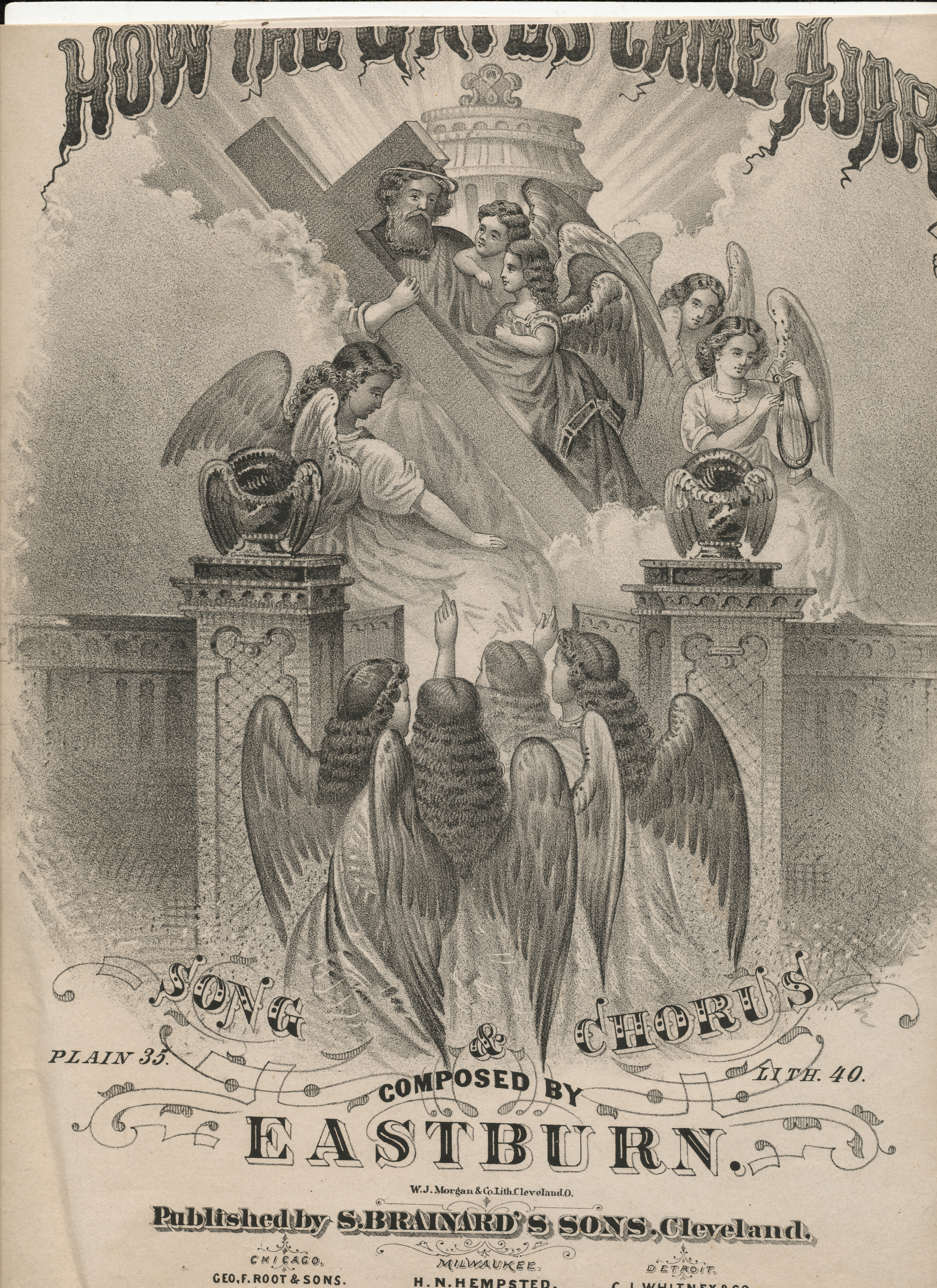
"How the Gates Came Ajar," Sheet music by Helen Bostwick & Eastburn, 1869.

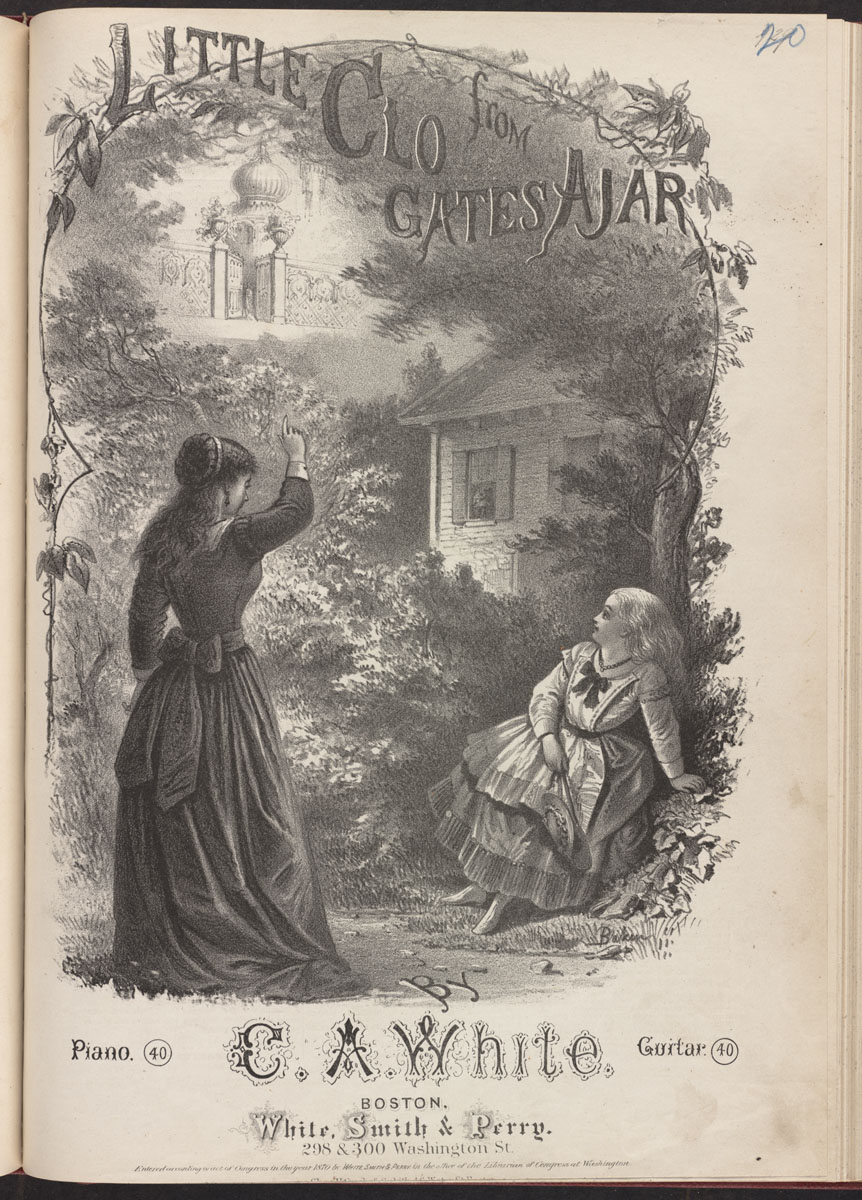
"Little Clo from Gates Ajar," Sheet music by C. A. White, 1870. Courtesy Boston Public Library.

=== Gates of heaven imagery in music 1866-1899 ===
| Title | Words | Music | Type | Year |
|---|---|---|---|---|
| Gates Ajar | Anon | Gussie Estabrook | Descriptive Ballad | 1869 |
| How the Gates Came Ajar | Helen L. Bostwick | Joseph Eastburn Winner | Song & Chorus | 1869 |
| Little Clo from Gates Ajar | C. A. White | C. A. White | | 1870 |
| The Gate Ajar for Me | Lydia O. Baxter, | Silas Vail | Song | 1872 |
| Opening the Golden Doors | Albert D. Hill | Charles D. Blake | Song & Chorus | 1873 |
| The Gates Forever Open | M. W. Hackelton | Joseph Eastburn Winner | Song & Chorus | 1873 |
| Passed within the Gates Ajar | Mammee E. Peck | Charles H. Gabriel | Funeral March | 1882 |
| Gates Ajar | R. N. Turner | John H. Kurzenknabe | Song | 1885 |

=== Gates Ajar floral arrangements for funerals ===
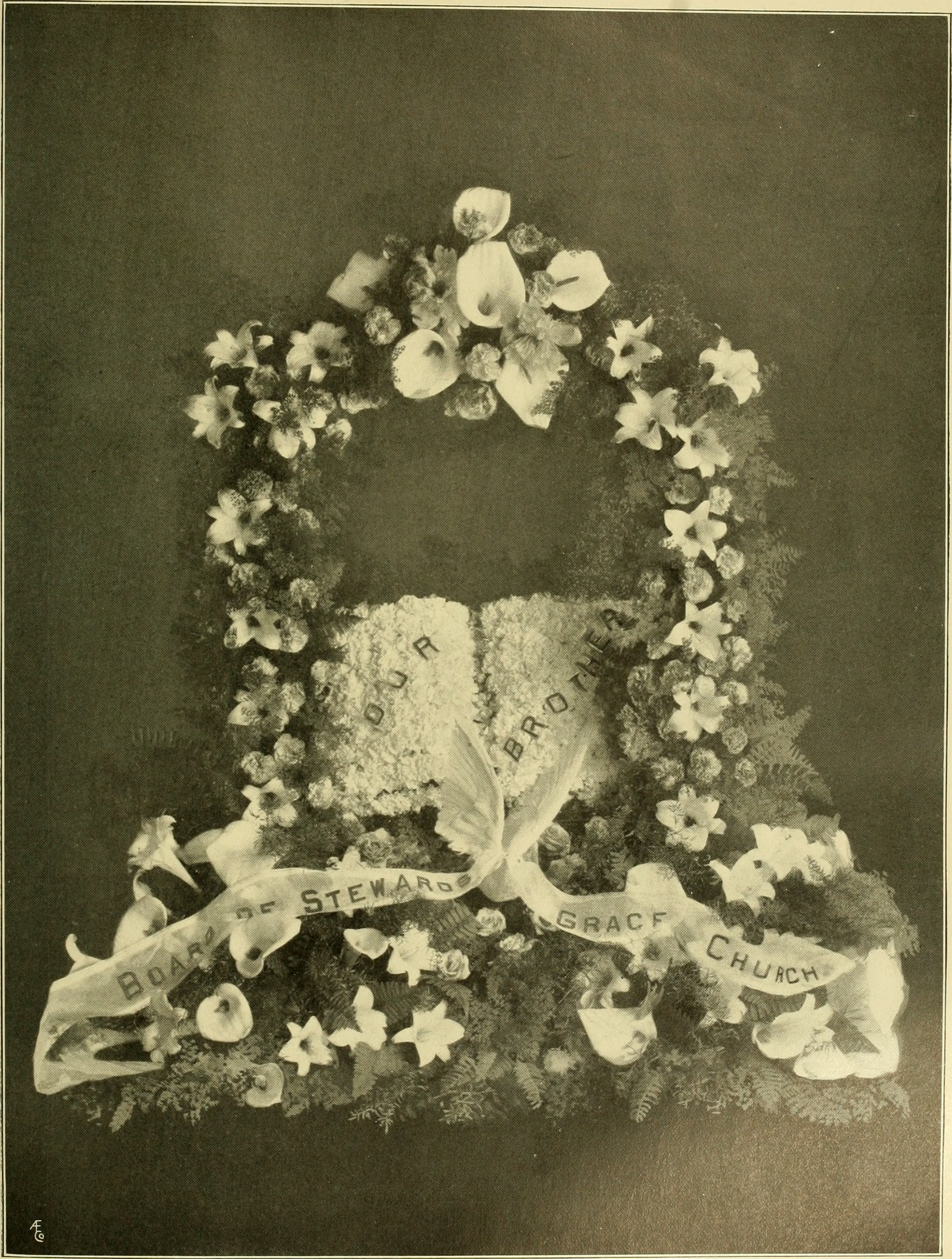
Gates Ajar floral arrangement, 1909.

By the early 1880s, florists had created the "Gates Ajar" floral piece. Obituaries began to describe these ornate tributes:

Probably the most elaborate emblem Portland has ever seen was one brought by the Eastern Railroad conductors. It was entitled the Gates Ajar. The emblem was fully three feet long and on its face were erected seven pillars, each at least 10 inches in height. The base was composed of camellias, and double white pinks, interwoven with some delicate green plant, and the columns respectively of red gilliflowers, double white pinks, pansies and white roses. The gates and railings were composed of delicate heath and smilax was gracefully twined about the design.

Church organizations welcomed the symbolism, evidenced by the announcement that the Methodist Episcopal Church "sent a floral representation of 'Gates Ajar.'" when Utica newsman and Sunday school teacher Benjamin Lewis died.

In September 1881 a stunned nation responded to the assassination of United States President James A. Garfield with ornate floral displays and long lines of mourners. A Boston paper noted "A beautiful representation of the gates ajar was made rosebuds and smilax." A reporter from Akron, Ohio commented on the "beautiful floral offerings" as the President lay in state: "Next is a representation of the gates of Heaven, one of which is ajar. The pillars are beautifully formed of white and purple blossoms, and the gates of evergreen." Gates Ajar funeral bouquets are still available and now described by florists as "traditional".
