= Austin Phelps =

American Congregational minister and educator (1820-1890)

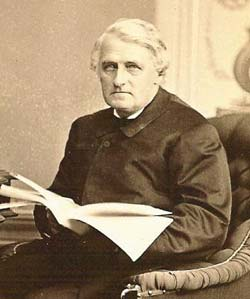
- Austin Phelps c. 1870
- Born: January 7, 1820; West Brookfield, Massachusetts
- Died: October 13, 1890 (aged 70); Bar Harbor, Maine
- Occupation: Minister
- Known for: President of Andover Theological Seminary; author of Christian books still in print
- Spouse(s): Elizabeth Stuart, Mary Stuart, Mary Ann Johnson
- Children: Mary Gray, Moses Stuart, Amos Lawrence, Francis Johnson, Edward Johnson

Austin Phelps (January 7, 1820 – October 13, 1890), was an American Congregational minister and educator. He was for 10 years President of the Andover Theological Seminary and his writings became standard textbooks for Christian theological education and remain in print today.

== Biography ==
Austin Phelps was born in West Brookfield, Massachusetts. His father, Eliakim Phelps was a clergyman and the principal of a girls’ school in Pittsfield, Massachusetts. Eliakim Phelps was later pastor of a Presbyterian church in Geneva, New York, where he was installed as in 1830, and in 1835 he was elected Secretary of the American Educational Society of Philadelphia.

After preparing for college, at the age of twelve Austin studied at Hobart College from 1833 to 1835, then at Amherst for six months. He was by far the youngest boy in his class and was intensely unhappy. In 1835 he rejoined his family in Philadelphia where he finally obtained a degree in 1837 from the University of Pennsylvania.

He studied theology at Union Theological Seminary (including six months of Hebrew studies under Isaac Nordheimer), at the Yale Divinity School, and later at Andover. In 1840, he was licensed to preach by the Third Presbytery of Philadelphia. In 1842, he was pastor of the Pine Street (Congregational) Church in Boston when he met and married in the autumn of that year Elizabeth Stuart (August 13, 1815 – November 30, 1852). She was the eldest daughter of Moses Stuart, president of Andover Theological Seminary. His wife Elizabeth Stuart, aside from Jacob Abbott, was one of the earliest writers of books for girls, publishing the four volume Kitty Brown series of books for girls under the pen name H. Trusta and other books. They had three children, Mary Gray (b. 1844), Moses Stuart (b. 1849) and Amos Lawrence (b. 1852).

In the spring of 1848 he moved his family to Andover, Massachusetts, where he became professor of sacred rhetoric and homiletics at Andover Theological Seminary. In 1869 he was selected as president of Andover, a role he served in until 1879 when failing health forced him to resign.

For seven months in 1850, his father Eliakim's home in Stratford, CT was the site of bizarre spiritualist rappings and phenomena which were widely reported in the press. These events were an influence on Austin's daughter Mary Gray Phelps (1844-1911), a feminist who later wrote three popular spiritualist novels under the name Elizabeth Stuart Phelps Ward.

After his wife Elizabeth died of brain fever on November 20, 1852, their 8-year-old daughter Mary Gray asked to be renamed in honor of her mother. He married Elizabeth's sister, Mary Stuart (b. 1822), in 1854, but she died only eighteen months later. He married for a third time Mary Ann Johnson (1829–1918) of Boston, with whom he had two more children, Edward and Francis. Austin died on October 13, 1890, at Bar Harbor, Maine.

== Works ==
His Theory of Preaching (1881) and English Style in Public Discourse (1883) became standard textbooks. With Professors E. A. Park and D. L. Furber he edited Hymns and Choirs (1860), and with Professor Park and Lowell Mason The Sabbath Hymn Book (1859). His book The Still Hour (1859), a summary of a series of sermons on prayer, is a devotional classic and remains in publication.

His other works are:

- The New Birth (1867), portraying conversion (in some instances) as a gradual change
- Sabbath Hours (1874)
- Studies of the Old Testament (1878)
- Men and Books (1882)
- My Portfolio (1882)
- My Study (1885)
- The Still Hour: or, Communion with God (1860)
- The Certainty of Success in Preaching (1889)
- My Note Book (1890)

== Quotes ==
"Wear the old coat and buy the new book."

"We are never more like Christ than in prayers of intercession."

"Suffering is a wonderful fertilizer for the roots of character. The great objective of this life is character, for it is the only thing we can carry with us into eternity. And gaining as much of the highest character possible is the purpose of our trials."
