= Hana Lili =

Welsh singer-songwriter and former voice actress

- Born: 1999 or 2000 (age 26–27); Sully, Vale of Glamorgan
- Occupations: Singer-songwriter, voice actress
- Years active: 2010–present

Hana Lili (born 1999 or 2000) is a Welsh singer-songwriter and former voice actress. Her music has been used as a soundtrack on the Love Island television series. In June 2023, she supported Coldplay on the Cardiff leg of their World tour.

Her music is described as an introspective variant of indie pop and folk pop, with her voice described as a mixture of Billie Eilish and Natalie Imbruglia.

== Biography ==
Hana Lili is from Sully in the Vale of Glamorgan.

She started her career as a voice actress, being the voice of Chloe in the Welsh dub of the first season of Chloe's Closet. Later on, she became the voice of Danny in the second season. She performed at the National Eisteddfod of Wales and began writing songs when she was 14. She later studied music production at college. She wrote acoustic songs in her bedroom and published them online.

Her music career began using the name HANA2K due to her birthyear. In 2021 she was contacted by ITV's Love Island to ask if her music could be used on the series. Having been unable to perform live because of the UK's COVID-19 restrictions, she jumped at the chance and her track, Stay, was used in one of the programmes.

Lili released her debut EP, "Flowers Die In The Summer", on 29 October 2021. Written during COVID-19 lockdown it expressed Lili's loneliness and paranoia at the time. Her songs are typically about her emotions, relationships and personal hardships. Her second EP, "Existential", was released in December 2022.

Lili is a first language Welsh speaker and sings in both English and Welsh.

In 2023 she formed a band, performing at the Welsh language Gwyl Fach y Fro festival in March.

On 6 and 7 June 2023, Lili supported the Cardiff leg of Coldplay's Music of the Spheres World Tour at the Principality Stadium, together with Scottish group Chvrches. She opened the concerts backed by her own band, saying afterwards "It was so surreal, I still don't think it's quite sunk in yet".
