= The Silent Partner (novel) =

Novel by Elizabeth Stuart Phelps Ward

The Silent Partner is a historical novel published by Elizabeth Stuart Phelps Ward in 1871.

Original Copy of The Silent Partner

Serving as a critique of domesticity and poor workforce conditions, the novel features themes of pro-feminism, classism, industrialism, anti-capitalism, sexism and socioeconomics. A lesser known work in Phelps's collection of published novels, The Silent Partner received mixed reviews.

== Overview ==
Published in 1871, The Silent Partner is set in industrial-era Massachusetts and explores real life issues that took hold in the rapid urbanization of major U.S. cities throughout the 18th and 19th century, including child labor, constant machinery-related fatalities, and unfair wage rates amongst unsafe conditions. The novel also discusses broader themes of misogyny and feminism within the corporate sphere that also reflected real-life instances of discrimination against women's roles and contributions in the workplace.

The location of where the novel takes place is based on Phelps's real life hometown, Boston, Massachusetts.

== Plot ==
Set primarily in the fictional town of Five Falls, Massachusetts, the life of Perley Kelso is turned upside down after her father is suddenly killed. She inherits his part of ownership in the Hayle and Kelso Mills, a textile and fabrics mill co-owned by Perley's fiance, Maverick. After meeting spunky and strong-willed factory worker Sip Garth, Perley begins to integrate herself more and more into the business and its operations, where she is expected to take the most minimal role in presence command and involvement as a business partner; essentially becoming a silent partner.

Limited by the assumptions of her fellow co-owners over her intelligence and ability to perform a leading and serious career, she becomes close confidantes with Sip and is further enveloped into the dismal conditions of her workers's labor conditions, of which there is little to no pay, individuals are constantly maimed, injured, or killed, and disregarded in their contributions and overworked efforts. Through this transcendence of class and socioeconomics, the livelihoods of these two women begin to merge, and each one must navigate the obstacles of social pressures, unfair judgement, loss and grief, class restriction, corporate oppression, and the everyday obstacles of womanhood.

== Main characters ==
- Perley Kelso - a young socialite who inherits her father's business, Hayle and Kelso Mills, after his untimely death. Naive and materialist at first, she comes to assert her intelligence, running her business and protecting the livelihoods of her factory workers from the harsh realities of hard labor conditions
- Sip Garth - a young girl who has spent most of her life working in the factory, she becomes a close ally of Perley and represents the essence of the working hands at Halle and Kelso Mills
- Catty Garth - Sip's younger deaf sister who works many long hours alongside her despite mental handicaps and verbal challenges
- Maverick Hayle - Perley's fiance and part owner of the Hayle and Kelso Mills, who often discourages Perley from getting too involved in the inner workings of the mill
- Fly Hayle
- Bub Mell - an eight year old factory worker who suffers from tobacco addiction
- Stephen Garrick

== Influence ==
Throughout Phelps's career of writing, most of her works have surrounded challenging the values of domesticity and the confinement of women to the home. Silent Partner continues to follow her previously published works in that the plot discusses the dynamics of women who choose to ignore social boundaries and follow ambition outside of their assigned gender roles and the home. Phelps's religious background influenced the latter part of the plot.

== Reception ==
Though obscure to a mainstream audience many historians, literary analysts, and journal outlets have critiqued and theorized the connections between the novel and real-life circumstances of the Industrial Age. While some have praised the novel for portrayals of supporting feminism and the well-being of the poorer classes, some have argued that the novel's depiction and ending are symbols of a discombobulated plot that tries to grasp and hold onto its historical background. The New York Times reviewed the novel in May 1871, arguing that it had a dreary plot because a young woman sheds her comforted life for a world of poor conditions and unfair treatment.
