= Gypsy Breynton =

Fictional tomboy

- "Gypsy climbed out of the window without the slightest hesitation, and walked along the ridge-pole with the ease and fearlessness of a boy."
- Author: Elizabeth Stuart Phelps
- Genre: Sunday School
- Publication date: 1866

Gypsy Breynton is the heroine of an eponymous series of books written by Elizabeth Stuart Phelps.

The books were written in 1866–67 for Sunday schools and so are of an improving nature. Gypsy, as the name indicates, is an impetuous tomboy who lives a chaotic life lacking a system. Her development and experiences provide the basis for the restrained moralizing of the stories.

All that Mrs. Breynton said does not matter here; but Gypsy is not likely soon to forget it. A few words spoken, just as the conversation ended, became golden mottoes that helped her over many rough places in her life.
"It is all the old trouble, Gypsy,— you 'didn't think.' A little self-control, a moment's quiet thought, would have saved all this."
"Oh, I know it!" sobbed Gypsy. "That's what always ails me. I'm always doing things, and always sorry for them. I mean to do right, and I cannot remember. ... What shall I do with myself, mother?"

The four books in the series are

1. Gypsy Breynton
2. Gypsy's Cousin Joy
3. Gypsy's Sowing and Reaping
4. Gypsy's Year at the Golden Crescent

Gypsy Benton was part of an era introducing tomboyism in American literature. Around this same period, several other similar characters were created, including those in Little Women (1868) by Louisa May Alcott and What Katy Did (1872) by Sarah Chauncey Woolsey.
