= Hellfire Hotchkiss =

Unfinished novel by Mark Twain

- Author: Mark Twain
- Language: English
- Published: 1967 (posthumously)
- Publication place: USA

Hellfire Hotchkiss is an unfinished novel by Mark Twain. Twain completed three chapters of the novel in 1897, mostly while he was residing in Weggis, Switzerland. These remained unpublished until 1967 when they were incorporated into Mark Twain's Satires and Burlesques. As a result the book is not in the public domain.

The novel is notable for the reversed gender roles of its two main characters. The heroine, Rachel "Hellfire" Hotchkiss, is portrayed as a resourceful but temperamental tomboy. Oscar "Thug" Carpenter, in contrast, is portrayed as a sensitive, effeminate, and unstable young man. In one section of the book, a villager remarks, "Pudd'nhead Wilson says Hellfire Hotchkiss is the only genuwyne male man in this town and Thug Carpenter's the only genuwyne female girl, if you leave out sex and just consider the business facts."

According to some sources, the character of Oscar Carpenter was partially based on Twain's brother Orion Clemens, who was notoriously indecisive, while Rachel Hotchkiss may have been based on Twain's friend Lillie Hitchcock.
