= Elizabeth Stuart Phelps Ward =

American novelist (1844–1911)

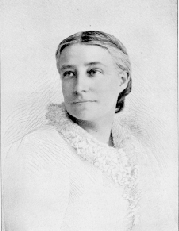
- Born: Mary Gray Phelps; August 31, 1844; Boston, Massachusetts, U.S.
- Died: January 28, 1911 (aged 66); Newton Center, Massachusetts, U.S.
- Other names: Lily Phelps, Mary Adams
- Occupations: Writer, essayist, activist

Elizabeth Stuart Phelps Ward (August 31, 1844 – January 28, 1911) was an early feminist American author and intellectual who challenged traditional Christian beliefs of the afterlife, challenged women's traditional roles in marriage and family, and advocated clothing reform for women.

In 1868, three years after the Civil War ended, she published The Gates Ajar, which depicted the afterlife as a place replete with the comforts of domestic life and where families would be reunited—along with family pets—through eternity.

In her 40s, Phelps broke convention again when she married a man 17 years her junior. Later in life she urged women to burn their corsets. Her later writing focused on feminine ideals and women's financial dependence on men in marriage. She was the first woman to present a lecture series at Boston University. During her lifetime she was the author of 57 volumes of fiction, poetry and essays. In all of these works, she challenged the prevailing view that woman's place and fulfilment resided in the home. Instead, Phelps' work depicted women as succeeding in nontraditional careers as physicians, ministers, and artists.

Near the end of her life, Phelps became very active in the animal rights movement. Her novel, Trixy, published in 1904, was constructed around the topic of vivisection and the effect this kind of training had on doctors. The book became a standard polemic against experimentation on animals.

== Early life ==
Elizabeth (August 31, 1844 – January 28, 1911) was born in Boston, Massachusetts to American Congregational minister Austin Phelps and Elizabeth Wooster Stuart Phelps (1815–1852). Her baptismal name was Mary Gray Phelps, after a close friend of her mother's. Her mother wrote the Kitty Brown series of books for girls under the pen name H. Trusta. Her brother, Moses Stuart Phelps, was born in 1849. Her mother was the eldest daughter of Moses Stuart, the well-known professor of Sacred Literature at Andover Theological Seminary. Her mother was intermittently ill for most of her adult life and died of brain fever shortly after the birth of their third child, Amos, on November 20, 1852, Then eight years old, Mary Gray asked to be renamed in honor of her mother.

Her father Austin Phelps was a widely respected Congregational minister and educator. He was pastor of the Pine Street Congregational Church until 1848, when he accepted a position as the Chair of Rhetoric at Andover Theological Seminary. He met Elizabeth Phelps that same year and they were married in the fall. The family moved to Boston and in 1869 he became President of the Andover Theological Seminary, where he served in that role for 10 years. His writings became standard textbooks for Christian theological education and remain in print today.

Two years after her mother' death, Elizabeth's father married her mother's sister, Mary Stuart. She was also a writer but died of tuberculosis only 18 months later. Less than six months later her father married Mary Ann Johnson, the sister to a minister, and they had two sons, Francis Johnson (1860) and Edward Johnson (1863).

Phelps received an upper class education, attending the Abbot Academy and Mrs. Edwards' School for Young Ladies. She had a gift for telling stories as a child. One source noted, "She spun amazing yarns for the children she played with... and her schoolmates of the time a little farther on talk with vivid interest of the stories she used to improvise for their entertainment. At thirteen, she had a story published in Youth's Companion and other stories appeared in Sunday School publications.

== Writing ==
In most of her writings she used her mother's name "Elizabeth Stuart Phelps" as a pseudonym, both before and after her marriage in 1888 to Herbert Dickinson Ward, a journalist seventeen years younger. She also used the pseudonym Mary Adams. She gained recognition early in life from prominent literary figures including Thomas Wentworth Higginson and John Greenleaf Whittier.

At age 19 she sent a Civil War story titled "A Sacrifice Consumed" to Harper's Magazine. The magazine editor warmly received her contribution and sent her a generous payment along with a note asking her to write for them again. In 1864 Harpers published her first adult fiction. She then began writing her first books for children which became known as the "Tiny series". She followed these with the four-volume Gypsy Breynton series, which was later recognized as her best-known juvenile writing. She also published two books that depicted the realistic adventures of a four-year-old boy named Trotty, The Trotty Book (1870) and Trotty's Wedding Tour, and Story-book (1873). Her story "The Tenth of January" appeared in The Atlantic Monthly in March 1868. It was about the death of scores of girls in the Pemberton Mill collapse and fire in Lawrence, Massachusetts on January 10, 1860.

=== Spiritualist novels ===
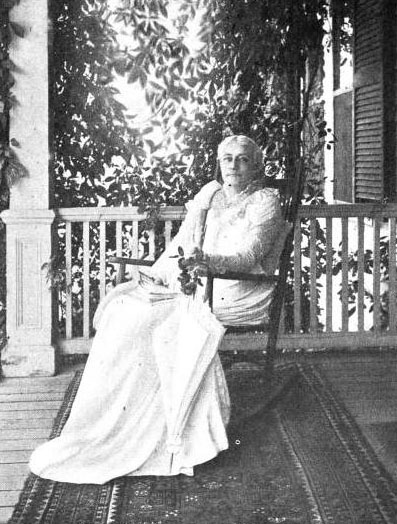
Ward, circa 1910

Ward wrote three Spiritualist novels. The first, The Gates Ajar, became her most famous. It took her two years to write. She wrote later that after she spent more than two years revising it, "I could have said it by heart." The book was finally published after the end of the Civil War. In it, she writes about a girl named Mary Cabot, whose brother was killed during the Civil War. The grief-stricken girl becomes convinced that she and her brother will be reunited in an afterlife in which people retain their physical shapes and personalities.

The book became very popular, in part from its positive portrayal of death shortly after the Civil War, during which more than 400,000 individuals lost their lives. It also received a great deal of criticism for the way Phelps depicted heaven as less a place to greet God than to be reunited with loved ones. It rejected the traditional Calvinist view of Heaven. The controversy only stimulated sales, and within a few weeks after its release, her publisher sent her a payment for $600 (about $12,351 in today's dollars) and a note, “Your book is moving grandly. It has already reached a sale of 4,000 copies.”

Over 100,000 copies were sold in the United States and England and it was translated and reprinted in at least four other languages.

She received thousands of letters in response to the first book. She wrote two more books on the same topic, Between the Gates and Beyond the Gates. She then wrote a novella about animal rights titled Loveliness. Phelps said she wrote The Gates Ajar to comfort a generation of women who were devastated by the losses of their loved ones following the Civil War and who found no comfort in traditional religion. Phelps' vision of heaven made the book a run-away best seller. She later built on the success of the first Gates book with a series of other books that featured the word "Gates" in their titles and which continued to reinforce her views of the afterlife as a place with gardens, comfortable front porches, and finely built houses.

The Gates Ajar inspired works by other authors in the following decades, such as Mark Twain's parody "Captain Stormfield's Visit to Heaven" (1909) and Louis B. Pendleton's Wedding Garment: A Tale of the Afterlife (1894). The final novel in the Gates series was also adapted into a stage play in 1901 titled Within the Gates.

=== Advocate for social reform ===
While writing these and other popular stories, she became an advocate through her lectures and other work for social reform, temperance, and women's emancipation. She was also involved in clothing reform for women, and in 1874 urged them to burn their corsets.

Burn up the corsets! ... No, nor do you save the whalebones, you will never need whalebones again. Make a bonfire of the cruel steels that have lorded it over your thorax and abdomens for so many years and heave a sigh of relief, for your emancipation I assure you, from this moment has begun.

A key influence on her writings on women's rights, especially her beliefs regarding marriage, were the works of John Stuart Mill, such as Mill's 1869 essay The Subjection of Women. Though Phelps was an avid writer on reform issues, she was not actively involved with women's rights organizations or other reform groups of the time. The progressive deterioration of her health from the 1870s onward kept her contributions mostly literary in nature rather than public.

In 1877 she published a novel, The Story of Avis, that was ahead of its time. The work focuses on many of the early feminist issues of her era. In it she portrayed a woman's struggle to balance her married life and associated domestic responsibilities with her passion to become a painter. The protagonist is an independent, extraordinary woman in her time who initially decides her goals will not be constrained by marriage and financial dependence on a husband, although she eventually ends up marrying anyhow. She may have been reflecting her mother's life when she described the impossibility of pursuing both her artistic ambitions and adhering to her domestic responsibilities. Elizabeth's novel was largely influenced by Elizabeth Barrett Browning's Aurora Leigh. Phelps's unfavorable depiction of men's and women's roles in marriage was controversial.

In 1876 Phelps became the first woman to present a lecture series at Boston University. Her presentations were titled "Representative Modern Fiction" and they analyzed the works of George Eliot.

Social advocacy was also incorporated in Phelp's various children's literature publications as she did not attempt to conceal the inequities of the era's class structure. In stories such as "Bobbit's Hotel", "One Way to Get An Education", and "Mary Elizabeth", Phelps directly illustrates the impact of poverty on children. In "Bobbit's Hotel", the title character dies in an effort to shelter two young orphans. "Mary Elizabeth" depicts a young homeless girl's choices between theft and begging as a means of survival. "One Way to Get An Education" depicts a child laborer's desire for a better life than mill work and subsequent decision to self-injure in order to attain an education.

=== Later work ===
Elizabeth Stuart Phelps and her husband co-authored two Biblical romances in 1890 and 1891. Her autobiography, Chapters from a Life, was published in 1896 after being serialized in McClure's. She also wrote a large number of essays for Harper's Magazine.

Phelps continued to write short stories and novels into the twentieth century. Her novel Trixy (1904) focused on antivivisection, a cause she supported later in life. Writer, feminist, and animal rights advocate Carol J. Adams describes the novel as "important and timely." Her last work, Comrades (1911) was published posthumously. Phelps died January 28, 1911, in Newton Center, Massachusetts.

== Selected works ==
- Ellen's Idol (1864)
- Gypsy Breynton and three sequels (1866–1867)
- Mercy Gliddon's Work (1866)
- The Gates Ajar (1868)
- Men, Women, and Ghosts (1869)
- The Trotty Book (1870)
- Hedged In (1870)
- The Silent Partner (1871)
- What to Wear (1873)
- Poetic Studies (1875)
- The Story of Avis (1877)
- An Old Maid's Paradise (1879)
- Sealed Orders (1879)
- Doctor Zay (1882)
- Beyond the Gates (1883)
- Songs of the Silent World (1884)
- The Madonna of the Tubs (1886)
- Jack the Fisherman (1887)
- The Gates Between (1887)
- The struggle for Immortality (1889)
- Austin Phelps, A Memoir (1891)
- Donald Marcy (1893)
- A Singular Life (1895)
- Chapters from a Life (1896)
- The Supply at Saint Agatha's (1896)
- The Story of Jesus Christ (1897)
- Within the Gates (1901)
- Avery (1902)
- Confessions of a Wife (1902, as Mary Adams)
- Trixy (1904)
- Walled In (1907)
- The Whole Family (collaborative novel with eleven other authors, 1908)
- Jonathan and David (1909)
- The Empty House and Other Stories (1910)

=== With Herbert Dickinson Ward ===
- Come Forth (1891)
- A Lost Hero (1890)
- The Master of the Magicians (1890)

== See also ==
- Corset controversy
- Women's Rights Historic Sites
