= LittleBe =

British television block for children, broadcast on ITVBe

littleBe
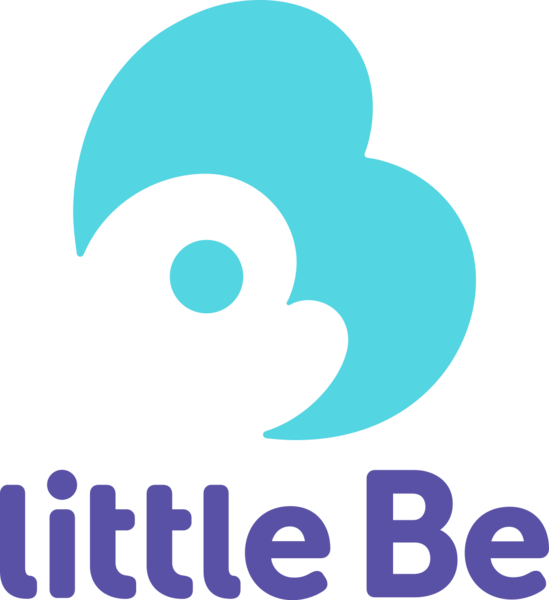
- Network: ITVBe
- Launched: 3 September 2018; 7 years ago
- Closed: 31 May 2024; 2 years ago
- Country of origin: United Kingdom
- Owner: ITV Digital Channels Ltd (ITV plc)
- Original language: English

littleBe was a British preschool children's television programming block broadcast by ITVBe in the United Kingdom. The block was launched on 3 September 2018, and ended on 31 May 2024. The block aired from 9 am to 12 pm on weekdays, and was aimed at children aged two to five.

== History ==
On 4 July 2018, the block was announced at the Children's Media Conference, tentatively, without a name. It was eventually named littleBe and launched on 3 September 2018.

The block was similar to the Mini CITV block that CITV used to broadcast before the network removed all pre-school TV shows from the channel.

On 30 August 2018, ITV announced that Sooty would move to the block from its original broadcaster, CITV.

At 12 noon on 31 May 2024, littleBe was quietly discontinued for unknown reasons and without any official announcement. However, its programming, including Sooty, continues to be seen through streaming service ITVX.

=== Development ===
Jason Ford from ITV Creative coordinated with Bubble to create visual effects and animation for the block's promos and brand. Greg Claridge and James Taylor composed the block's music and sound effects.

Ford stated for the development:

"It was an absolute pleasure to work with Greg, James and the team. From the offset, they completely understood the unique feel I wanted to achieve to complement the stripped-back animation style for littleBe."

— Jason Ford, ITV Creative, Creative Director Brand & Design

== Programmes ==
Programmes on the block were aimed toward a preschool audience and ranged from acquisitions such as Pingu in the City, to original series such as Sooty.
