= Moses Stuart =

American biblical scholar

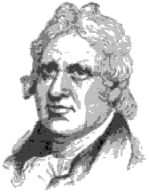
- Born: March 26, 1780; Wilton, Connecticut
- Died: January 4, 1852 (aged 71); Andover, Massachusetts
- Education: Yale University
- Occupation: Biblical scholar

Moses B. Stuart (March 26, 1780 – January 4, 1852) was an American biblical scholar.

== Life and career ==
Moses Stuart was born in Wilton, Connecticut on March 26, 1780. He was brought up on a farm, then attended Yale University graduating with highest honours in 1799; in 1802 he was admitted to the Connecticut bar and was appointed as a tutor at Yale, where he remained for two years. In 1806 Stuart became the pastor of the Centre (Congregational) Church of New Haven. He was later appointed professor of sacred literature in the Andover Theological Seminary in 1810.

He succeeded Eliphalet Pearson (1752–1826), the first preceptor of the Phillips (Andover) Academy and in 1786–1806 was appointed professor of Hebrew and Oriental languages at Harvard. At this time he knew hardly more than elementary Hebrew and not much more Greek; in 1801–12 he prepared for the use of his students a Hebrew grammar which they copied day by day from his manuscript; in 1813 he printed his Grammar, which appeared in an enlarged form, with a copious syntax and praxis, in 1821, and was republished in England by Dr Pusey in 1831. Stuart was elected a Fellow of the American Academy of Arts and Sciences in 1815 and the American Philosophical Society in 1824.

He gradually made the acquaintance of German works in hermeneutics, first Johann Friedrich Schleusner, Seiler and Gesenius, and taught himself German, arousing much suspicion and distrust among his colleagues by his unusual studies. However, recognition soon followed, partly as a result of his Letter to Dr Channing on the Subject of Religious Liberty (1830), but more largely through the growing favour shown to German philology and critical methods.

In 1842 Stuart published a second edition of his work Hints on the Interpretation of Prophecy. The historical setting of this work he alluded to in his Preface, writing, "It is time for the churches, in reference to the matters now before us, to seek some refuge from the tumultuous ocean on which they have of late been tossed." (p. 5) This setting he more explicitly addressed in his Appendix, where he replied to the book George Duffield, D.D., of Detroit, published in 1842, Dissertations on the Prophecies Relative to the Second Coming of Jesus Christ. Stuart as well mentioned Duffield's view of William Miller in regard to the time of the Second Coming (p. 172).

Stuart's 1850 book Conscience and the Constitution took the position that slavery was an institution allowed by the Bible, but that, as it was actually practiced in the United States, slavery was morally wrong. Therefore there should be a voluntary emancipation of slaves by the Southern slave owners. However, Parker Pillsbury reported in his 1847 "Forlorn Hope of Slavery" that Stuart of Andover Theological Seminary wrote "to President Fisk of another Theological Seminary, that 'slavery may exist, without violating the Christian faith or the Church.'"

Stuart has been called the father of exegetical studies in America. He contributed largely by his teaching to the renewal of foreign missionary zeal—of his 1,500 students more than 100 became foreign missionaries, among them such skilled translators as Adoniram Judson, Elias Riggs and William G Schauffler.

In 1848 Stuart resigned his chair at Andover. He died in Andover on January 4, 1852.

== Major works ==
- Winer's Greek Grammar of the New Testament (1825), with Edward Robinson
- Critical History and Defence of the Old Testament Canon
- Hug's Introduction to the New Testament (1836), translation from the German
- Commentary on the Epistle to the Hebrews (1827–1828)
- Commentary on the Epistle to the Romans (1832)
- A Hebrew Chrestomathy: Designed as an Introduction to a Course of Hebrew Study (1832)
- Hints on the Interpretation of Prophecy Second Edition (1842); this Andover printing sometimes lacks the Appendix containing his reply to Duffield. The 1851 New York printing of the same edition does contain Stuart's Appendix.
- Commentary on the Apocalypse (1845)
- Miscellanies (1846)
- Gesenius's Hebrew Grammar (1846), a version which involved Stuart in a long controversy with Thomas Conant, the earlier, and possibly more scholarly, translator of Gesenius
- Commentary on the Book of Daniel (1850)
- Commentary on Ecclesiastes (1851)
- Commentary on the Book of Proverbs (1852)
