= Johann Friedrich Schleusner =

German Protestant theologian (1759-1831)

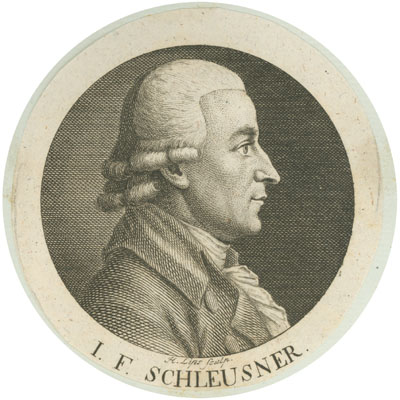
Johann Friedrich Schleusner

Johann Friedrich Schleusner (16 January 1759 – 21 February 1831) was a German Protestant theologian. He was considered one of the more prominent German theological scholars of his time.

== Life ==
Schleusner was born on 16 January 1759 in Leipzig. He enrolled on 19 May 1775 at the University of Leipzig, where he obtained a "Magister" degree in Theology on 18 February 1779. In 1781 he began lecturing at the university, and was also the morning preacher at the Leipzig University church. On 7 October 1782 he became a Bachelor of Theology.

In Easter 1785, he became an assistant professor of theology at the University of Göttingen. He obtained a doctoral degree on 2 April 1791 in Göttingen. In 1794 he took the position of the fourth professor of theology at the University of Wittenberg, with the associated positions of provost of the Wittenberg Castle Church and assessor at Wittenberg consistory. He was rector of Wittenberg University in the winter semesters 1798, 1804 and 1808. In 1805 he became the third theological professor. In 1817, the government established a post-graduate seminary at Wittenburg, appointing Carl Ludwig Nitzsch as its head and Schleusner as second director, but placing the third director, Heinrich Leonhard Heubner in charge of affairs.

In February 1829, Schleusner was forced to retire due to a stroke, and he died of a second stroke on 21 February 1831 in Wittenberg. Schleusner was married to Sophie Christiane Weber (7 February 1768 – 30 July 1801). His son George Schleusner also gained recognition in Wittenberg.

== Works ==
Perhaps Schleusner's best known work is his Novum lexicon Graeco-Latinum in Novum Testamentum, published in 1792, which translated Greek words found in the New Testament into Latin, the scholarly language of his day. This lexicon was used as the basis for other vernacular dictionaries, such as The Tyro's Greek and English lexicon published in 1825. The lexicon has been criticized for needlessly multiplying definitions of words, and not being truly scientific.

== Bibliography ==
- Catalogus bibliothecae Joannis Friderici Schleusneri [Vitebergae d. 3 Julii 1832] distrah., Wittenberg 1832
- Novvs thesavrvs philologico-criticvs, Leipzig 1820–21 5 Bd.
- Sylloges emendationum coniecturalium in versiones graecas V. T. p. ..., Wittenberg 1799-1807
- Novum lexicon Graeco-Latinum in Novum Testamentum, congessit et variis observationibus philologicis illustravit ..., 2 Bd., Leipzig 1792, Leipzig 1801, Leipzig 1808, Leipzig 1819
- Therasaurus s. lexicon in LXX et reliquos interpreters graecos et scriptores apocryphos V. T. 5. Bd.
- Observationum nonnullarum de patrum Graecorum auctoritate et usu in constituenda versionum Graecarum V. T. lectione genuina p. ..., Wittenberg 1795–1798
- Cvrae hexaplares in Psalmorvm libros ex Patribvs graecis, Göttingen 1785
