= Timeline of children's television on other British TV channels =

This article timelines children's programming on Channel 4, Channel 5 and other television channels in the United Kingdom.

== 1980s and 1990s ==
- 1982
  - 1 November – S4C launches and programming for children is included as part of its remit with its programming block named Clwb S4C.
  - 2 November – Channel 4 launches and programming for children is included as part of its remit.
- 1984
  - 1 September – The Children's Channel launches. It broadcasts during the daytime hours, timesharing its cable slot with evening-only services.
- 1985
  - 20 July – Sky Channel launches a weekend morning children's programming block called Fun Factory.
- 1986
  - 1 September – The DJ Kat Show launches on Sky Channel as a weekday children's programming block. It aired at breakfast and in the afternoon.
- 1989
  - March – The Children's Channel starts broadcasting free-to-air on Astra 1A, airing from 5 am to 10 am on weekdays and from 5 am to 12 noon at weekends, time-sharing with Lifestyle.
- 1990
  - 26 March–2 December – As part of its five-channel offering, British Satellite Broadcasting operates a general entertainment channel called Galaxy and some of its output, primarily at breakfast and teatime, feature programmes for children.
  - 17 September – S4C's children's block is renamed from Clwb S4C to Slot Meithrin.
- 1991
  - Following the launch of the Astra 1B-satellite, The Children's Channel's hours expand to air until 5 pm each day.
- 1992
  - The Children's Channel launches an early evening block showing programming targeting older children and teenagers. The segment, simply titled TCC, aired from 5 pm to 7 pm.
- 1993
  - 1 September
    - The start of Sky Multichannels sees the launch of Nickelodeon. It initially airs each day between 7 am and 7 pm.
    - The Children's Channel hours are cut from 6 am to 5 pm to allow The Family Channel to share its space. It also became a pay television channel on this date.
  - 17 September – Cartoon Network Europe launches, broadcasting from London. Broadcasting as a free-to-air channel, it timeshared with TNT and ran from 5 am to 7 pm.
- 1994
  - 11 September – After nine years on the air, the final edition of the children's programming block Fun Factory is broadcast.
  - Live presentation launches on Nickelodeon and is branded as Nick Alive!.
- 1995
  - May – Flextech completes its acquisition of The Children's Channel when it acquired the remaining 25.1% stake in Starstream for £15m. By that time, the channel is known on air as TCC and launches a block of programmes for preschool children called Tiny TCC, which aired each day between 6 am and 9 am.
  - 1 October – The Disney Channel launches as a premium channel as part of the Sky Movies package and aired between 6 am and 10 pm.
  - 31 December – Sky One's children's programming block The DJ Kat Show is cancelled after almost a decade on the air due to low viewership.
- 1996
  - August – Cartoon Network begins broadcasting for an extra two hours until 9 pm, with TNT's hours moving to 9 pm until 5 am.
  - 2 October – Fox Kids launches. It broadcasts each day between 6 am and 7 pm and airs live-action and animated comedy, drama and action-adventure programmes for children of all ages, Fox Kids also broadcast up to seven hours of commercial-free educational series each week.
  - October – Children's programming on Sky One is reduced following the launch of Fox Kids Network and most of the programmes shown on Sky One move to the new channel.
- 1997
  - 3 February
    - The programmes targeting older children that The Children's Channel was airing are separated into a new channel called Trouble with TCC reverting to the original name of The Children's Channel.
    - Tiny TCC is transferred to UK Living and renamed Tiny Living with its airtimes changing to 7 am to 9 am on weekdays and 7 am to 10 am at the weekend.
  - March – Channel 5 launches on 30 March and children's programming forms part of the output, including a 90-minute breakfast block called Milkshake!, which runs on weekdays between 7:30 am and 9 am.
  - August – Nickelodeon's start time is expanded to 6 am, giving it another hour of broadcasting.
- 1998
  - 3 April – The Children's Channel closes in the UK and Ireland whilst TCC's Nordic channels followed in October 2000.
  - 17 September – S4C's children's block is renamed from Slot Meithrin to Planed Plant.
  - 1 October – Nickelodeon's broadcast day expands to end three hours later at 10 pm with the launch of Sky Digital.
  - 15 November – The public launch of digital terrestrial television in the UK occurs with the launch of OnDigital and as part of the 19-channel line-up, Carlton creates three new channels for the platform, including a daytime channel for children, Carlton Kids. Cartoon Network also launches on OnDigital broadcasting as a 24 hour service.
  - December – Cartoon Network launches as part of the Sky Digital satellite platform.
- 1999
  - 1 September
    - Nick Jr. launches on Sky, allowing the channel to broadcast as a separate channel rather than as a daytime programming block on Nickelodeon, which launched in 1995. It also aired on Sky's analogue service until 2001, airing between 6 am and 10 am alongside Sky Sports 3, although this schedule would sometimes be altered if sports were being covered in the early morning.
    - A one-hour timeshift channel from Nickelodeon, titled Nick Replay, launches.
  - 28 September – Playhouse Disney launches on The Disney Channel as a programming block aimed at children under the age of five.
  - 15 October – Cartoon Network officially separates from the pan-European feed.

== 2000s ==
- 2000
  - 31 January – Carlton Kids closes.
  - 1 February – Discovery Kids launches on the OnDigital platform as a direct replacement for Carlton Kids.
  - 27 May – Boomerang launches to broadcast classic cartoons from the Hanna-Barbera, MGM and Warner Bros archive programme library, as well as its sister network reducing several classic cartoons in the schedule.
  - 29 September – Playhouse Disney launches as a standalone channel alongside Toon Disney and Disney Channel +1 on the Sky Digital platform.
  - Channel 5 launches a new programming block for older children. The Core is aimed at children ages 8 to 15 and airs on Saturday afternoons. A number of originally commissioned programmes were produced for the block, such as Harry and Cosh and Atlantis High, which aired alongside imported teen shows.
- 2001
  - 15 January – A new Jim Henson co-production called The Hoobs begins on Channel 4 with early-morning repeats until 2014.
  - 30 April – As Sky begins closing its analogue satellite services, Nickelodeon and Nick Jr. were removed on Sky Multichannels.
  - 30 June – The analogue feed on Astra 1C of Cartoon Network and TCM shuts down.
  - July – Disney acquires Fox Family Worldwide from News Corporation and Haim Saban, which gave Disney 76% ownership of Fox Kids.
- 2002
  - January – Channel 5's older children's programming block The Core is renamed to Milkshake! FM, named after the Channel 5 preschool aged block Milkshake!. This block airs from 9 am to 12 noon on Saturdays and Sundays, while a number of programmes aired during The Core continue to be broadcast during Saturday afternoons.
  - 22 July – Nicktoons launches.
  - 16 September – Milkshake! FM is rebranded again as two separate blocks, Shake! and Milkshake! Toons as Channel 5 is rebranded Five.
  - 14 October – CNX launches, targeting older children during the day and young adults during the evening. The channel primarily aired anime, extreme sports and dramas, principally action/crime series such as The Shield and Birds of Prey. The channel's film telecasts predominantly consisted of martial arts films, anime films and action/drama.
- 2003
  - 29 May – Toons & Tunes launches, broadcasting a mix of music videos alongside animated programming, aimed at children aged 4 to 9.
  - June – Toons & Tunes is rebranded as Pop.
  - 8 September
    - Pop launches Pop Plus, aimed at children aged 7 and under. It broadcasts between 6 am and 8 pm.
    - Toonami replaces CNX and moves from channel 244 to 621 on Sky and channel 148 to channel 732 on Telewest Broadband.
  - November – Fox Kids begins broadcasting 24 hours a day, seven days a week.
- 2004
  - Due to music videos becoming more adult-oriented in their content, the music video element of Pop is reduced with the animated content increased.
  - 31 May – Nick Jr. launches a nighttime programming block featuring classic British children's programmes from the 1970s titled Noggin airing daily from 8 pm to 10 pm.
  - July
    - The transition of Fox Kids to Jetix begins when a Jetix-branded block launches and aired every day from 3 pm to 7 pm.
    - The Playhouse Disney block on The Disney Channel ends.
    - Pop Plus is relaunched as Tiny Pop and the main channel became aimed at slightly older children.
  - September – The Jetix block on Fox Kids becomes part of the morning line-up between 7 am and 9 am.
  - October – Nicktoons TV extends its broadcasting hours by another three hours with a new block aimed at older children. The block was titled Toonz2Nite and featured a separate, distinct presentation from the main channel.
- 2005
  - 1 January – Fox Kids is fully relaunched as Jetix, a year after Fox Kids International originally announced plans to rebrand as Jetix, which implied action and adventure.
  - 5 September – Noggin is rebranded as Nick Jr. Classics.
  - 30 September – Tiny Living closes after nine years as a breakfast preschool slot on LivingTV.
  - October – Toonz2Nite is extended by an hour to air until 11 pm.
- 2006
  - 6 March – Boomerang launches a +1 timeshift channel.
  - 16 March – Changes are made to Disney services in the UK. Disney Channel and Playhouse Disney both discontinue as premium add-on channels. Disney Cinemagic is launched to serve Disney's slot in the Sky Movies premium bundle and replaces Toon Disney. Disney Channel +1 closed and was replaced with Disney Cinemagic +1.
  - 24 April
    - Nick Jr. 2 launches. Rather than operating as a timeshift channel, it airs the shows broadcast on the main channel but on a different schedule.
    - Cartoon Network Too launches as the sister station of Cartoon Network, airing programmes previously shown on the main channel. It aired from 3 am to 7 pm, sharing a broadcast frequency with TCM 2 from TCM. Initially it mainly broadcast cartoons made by Hanna-Barbera.
  - 26 June – Disney Channel +1 is relaunched.
  - 4 September – Cartoonito launches as a programming block on Cartoon Network Too running from 6 am to 3 pm.
  - 16 October – Channel 5 launches Five Life and its preschool slot Milkshake! airs each day between 9 am and 1 pm, beginning transmissions when Milkshake! ends on the main channel.
- 2007
  - 28 February – Discovery Kids closes as it merges with Discovery Wings to form Discovery Turbo.
  - 24 May
    - BabyTV launches on Sky Digital.
    - Cartoonito launches as a full-time channel, running between 3 am and 7 pm in a time-sharing agreement with Turner Classic Movies 2.
  - 6 August – Pop Girl launches, airing each day between 6 am and 9 pm.
  - Pop discontinues airing music videos and adopts a full-time animated series schedule.
  - Channel 5's older children's programming blocks Shake! and Milkshake! Toons are discontinued, although teen programmes continued to air on Saturday mornings on Channel 5 as an unbranded block.
- 2008
  - 19 May – Kix! launches and replaces Pop +1.
  - 23 June – S4C launches a daily morning children's programming block called Cyw.
  - 18 August – Nicktoonsters launches as a spin-off channel of Nicktoons. Targeted to 5 to 11-year-old children and aired mainly older library content from Nicktoons, broadcasting for 12 hours a day from 7 am.
  - December – Disney buys the remaining 26% share in Jetix to acquire full ownership of the company.
- 2009
  - 4 January – Classic children's television block Nick Jr. Classics ends on Nick Jr and on Nick Jr. 2 in 2010.
  - 1 April – Trouble closes after twelve years on the air.
  - 31 July – Nicktoonsters closes after less than a year on the air and was replaced by Nicktoons +1, known as Nicktoons Replay.
  - 4 October – Following the entry by Channel 5 into a strategic sponsorship with Disney Channel, Shake! returns to air. Under the new arrangement, Disney sponsors the block and provides some Disney Channel programming for the slot such as Hannah Montana and Wizards of Waverly Place.
  - Jetix is rebranded as Disney XD with a main focus towards boys, with Disney Channel shifting its focus more towards girls.

== 2010s ==
- 2010
  - 26 April – S4C launches Stwnsh, aimed at children between the ages of 7 and 13. It broadcasts on weekdays between 4 pm and 6 pm and on Saturdays between 9 am and 11 am. It replaces Planed Plant, which had been on the air from 1998.
  - 23 August – Nick Jr. begins broadcasting for 24 hours a day.
  - 5 October – Nickelodeon launches a high definition simulcast channel.
  - 18 October – Disney XD begins broadcasting a high definition simulcast channel.
- 2011
  - Early in the year, Cartoonito's broadcast hours are changed and began airing between 4 am and 8 pm.
  - 11 April – Preschool programming on 5Star ends and the block is replaced by teleshopping.
  - 7 May – Playhouse Disney is rebranded as Disney Junior.
  - September – Cartoon Network HD launches on Sky.
  - Channel 5 ends programming aimed at teenagers when Shake! is discontinued.
- 2012
  - 2 October – Nick Replay and Nicktoons Replay are renamed Nick +1 and Nick Jr. +1, respectively.
- 2013
  - 27 March – Disney Cinemagic closes in the UK and was replaced by Sky Movies Disney.
  - April – A high-definition simulcast of Disney Junior launches on Sky+ HD.
  - July – Kix Power launches, replacing Pop Girl +1 on Sky.
  - October – Kix Power is replaced by Kix +1.
- 2014
  - 20 March – Pop launches on Freeview but until April 2016, it was only available in areas that have a local television service.
  - 1 April – Cartoon Network Too closes and is replaced by Cartoon Network +1.
  - June – Kix is rebranded to target 7 to 17-year-old boys with a mix of cartoons, sci-fi, and action and adventure series.
  - 3 November – Nick Jr. 2 is renamed to Nick Jr. Too.
- 2015
  - 1 October – Pop Girl closes and is replaced by Kix +1.
- 2016
  - 7 April – Kix begins broadcasting on Freeview, transmitting on the multiplex also used by Pop.
  - July – Nick Jr. HD launches on Sky.
- 2017
  - July – Disney XD's timeshift is rebranded for a month to "Spider-Man Channel" and in September 2017, it was temporarily rebranded as "Mickey and Pals", airing various programming from Disney Junior.
  - August – Kix is rebranded as Pop Max, however, none of its programming changes.
  - 21 August – Milkshake! returns to 5Star where it airs from 9:15 am to 11 am. However, its run is short lived as is discontinued the following year.
- 2018
  - 15 January – Cartoonito begins broadcasting a 24-hour service.
  - April – Disney XD is temporarily rebranded as Avengers channel, airing only Avengers Assemble throughout the month as well as exclusive content to promote the release of Avengers: Infinity War. It lasted until 30 April 2018.
  - 21 July – Canadian children's channel ZooMoo launches on Virgin Media.
- 2019
  - June – Pop Max moves to the G-MAN multiplex, and Pop Max became only available in Manchester on Freeview.

== 2020s ==
- 2020
  - March 2020 – May 2021 – Toy Shop and Fast Food advertising are suspended due to the COVID-19 pandemic in the United Kingdom.
  - 30 September – Disney Channel UK and its sister channels close, with the channel's content moving to streaming service Disney+.
  - ZooMoo closes in the UK after just two years.
- 2022
  - 31 October – Sky sells its stake in Nickelodeon UK Ltd. to Paramount Networks UK & Australia; the Nickelodeon agreement had contained a non-compete clause that otherwise restricted Sky and Comcast from launching a children's television network while still holding a stake in Nickelodeon UK Ltd. Less than a month later, Sky announces plans to launch its own linear children's channel.
- 2023
  - 13 February – Sky launches Sky Kids, a commercial-free children's channel aimed at viewers aged 1 to 7.
- 2024
  - 20 March – Tiny Pop closes and is replaced by Great! Real.
  - 21 August – Tiny Pop returns on linear television with its programming and blocks also returning.
- 2025
  - 22 April – Pop Max closes.
  - 4 November – Narrative Entertainment UK Limited announces that it would close Pop and Tiny Pop linear channels in December as well as the Pop Player app, but the FAST channels including Pop Up would continue. Pop Player closed on 10 December.
  - 13 November – Disney Jr. relaunches on Sky.
- 2026
  - 1 January - Pop and Tiny Pop close as linear channels.

== See also ==
- Timeline of children's television on the BBC
- Timeline of children's television on ITV
