= Timeline of children's television on the BBC =

This is a timeline of the history of the broadcasting of children's programmes on BBC Television.

== 1930s and 1940s ==
- 1937
  - 24 April – The first children's television show to be aired on UK television, For the Children, is broadcast.
- 1939
  - The BBC Television Service is suspended, following the conclusion of a Mickey Mouse cartoon (Mickey's Gala Premier), owing to the imminent outbreak of the Second World War amid fears that the VHF transmissions would act as perfect guidance beams for enemy bombers attempting to locate central London. Additionally, the service's technicians and engineers will be needed for war efforts such as the development of radar.
- 1940 to 1945
  - Television is closed for the duration of the Second World War.
- 1946
  - 7 June – The BBC Television Service begins broadcasting again. The first words heard are "Good afternoon, everybody. How are you? Do you remember me – Jasmine Bligh?". The Mickey Mouse cartoon Mickey's Gala Premiere that had been the last programme transmitted seven years earlier at the start of World War II, is reshown after Bligh's introduction.
  - 7 July – The BBC's children's programme For the Children returns, one of the few pre-war programmes to resume after the reintroduction of the BBC Television Service.
  - 4 August – Children's puppet Muffin the Mule makes his debut in an episode of For the Children. He becomes so popular that he is given his own show later in the year.

== 1950s ==
- 1950
  - The BBC Children's Department is founded.
  - 11 July – Andy Pandy makes his debut on the BBC Television Service.
  - 25 November – The beginning of Whirligig on Saturdays means children's programmes now run on all seven days of the week, although on Tuesdays only Andy Pandy runs earlier in the afternoon; 5pm children's programmes, in common with the other days, do not begin on Tuesdays until 12 December.
- 1952
  - 16 January – Sooty, Harry Corbett's glove puppet bear, first appears on the BBC Television Service.
  - December – For the Children is used as the umbrella title for the 5pm children's programme sequences for the final time, it is then retitled Children's Television.
  - Watch with Mother, the long-running strand for younger children, makes its debut. It would run until 1978.
- 1953
  - 14 June – The first adaptation of The Railway Series by Wilbert Awdry airs. It would later be readapted as Thomas & Friends.
- 1955
  - 10 January – Annette Mills dies from a heart attack following an operation. Following her death, Muffin the Mule is dropped by the BBC Television Service.
  - 16 January – Sooty becomes a programme in its own right.
  - 24 September – The first edition of a new, live variety show, Crackerjack, is broadcast.
- 1956
  - June – Whirligig comes to an end.
- 1957
  - 24 September – The BBC begins broadcasting programmes for schools.
- 1958
  - 16 October – First broadcast of the United Kingdom's longest-running children's show Blue Peter.

== 1960s ==
- 1963
  - The Children's Department is temporarily closed down.
  - April – Watch with Mother is moved to a mid-morning slot and from September, the lunchtime broadcast is reintroduced.
- 1964
  - Family Department takes over children's programming.
  - 21 April – The first edition of Play School is broadcast. It is transmitted on the new BBC2 channel, which had launched the previous evening but the launch night was affected by a power cut that resulted in it becoming the first programme to air on the new channel.
  - 28 September – Blue Peter is now shown twice a week, on Mondays and Thursdays with each episode extended from 15 to 25 minutes.
- 1965
  - 18 October – The Magic Roundabout makes its debut on BBC1 and would run until 1977.
  - 13 December – Storytelling series Jackanory makes its debut on BBC1. It would run until 1996 and was briefly revived in 2006.
- 1966
  - 3 January – Camberwick Green is the first programme on BBC1 to be shot in colour and the first programme to feature the copyright year in the end credits; BBC1 would not broadcast in colour until almost four years later and regular BBC programmes also wouldn't show the copyright year in the end credits until six years later.
- 1967
  - Children's Department is reinstated.
  - 3 January – Trumpton is the second programme on BBC1 to be shot in colour and to also feature the copyright year in the end credits five years before regular BBC programmes would; only BBC2 became the first channel to broadcast colour nearly six months later. BBC1 however still wouldn't broadcast colour until almost three years later.
  - 25 December – Sooty is shown for the final time on the BBC. It would transfer to the newly-launched ITV franchise Thames the following year.
- 1968
  - 12 February – The Herbs, the first programme in colour produced by another company other than Gordon Murray Puppets Ltd. makes its debut.
- 1969
  - 6 October – Chigley is the third and final programme to be shot in colour on BBC1 before regular colour broadcasting and also happens to be the first programme to feature the copyright year in Roman numerals in the end credits nearly seven years ahead of most programmes by the BBC.

== 1970s ==
- 1970
  - 14 September – Blue Peter is broadcast in colour for the first time but black and white editions continue to be occasionally shown until 1974.
- 1971
  - 25 February – The animated children's adventure series Mr Benn airs on BBC1 with the copyright year shown from the previous year (1970) in the end credits shortly before the BBC tv logo. However, the other regular BBC programmes unlike The Trumptonshire Trilogy still wouldn't show any copyright years until the following year (1972).
- 1972
  - 27 March – For the first time, BBC1 broadcasts children's programmes on weekday mornings during the school holidays. The block, which runs for just over one hour, ends at 11am, which is the start time for Play School on BBC2.
  - 4 April – The first edition of Newsround is broadcast on BBC1, hosted by John Craven.
- 1973
  - 5 February – Elisabeth Beresford's well known popular children's characters The Wombles have spawned into a stop motion animated television series narrated by Bernard Cribbins and composed by Mike Batt on BBC1.
  - 20 August – The first episode of Why Don't You? airs on BBC1.
- 1974
  - 14 January – Pre-school educational series You and Me airs its first episode. It would run until 1992.
  - 24 June – BBC One Scotland airs Summer holiday children's programming opt-out schedules for the first time. The Summer holiday children's schedule (seen across the BBC network for the final three weeks from mid to late August) is time-shifted to air throughout the first three weeks of the holidays to viewers in Scotland owing to school holiday differences across the UK.
  - 9 September – John Craven's Newsround expands to four days a week. Previously, the programme had aired only on Tuesdays and Thursdays.
- 1975
  - 23 December – The animated children's upper nursery school programme Bod first airs on BBC1 with 11 more episodes to broadcast the following year.
- 1976
  - 5 January – BBC1 begin showing the children's stop motion animated series Paddington, based on the books by Michael Bond and narrated by Michael Hordern. Produced by FilmFair copyrighted the previous year (1975) in the end credits.
  - 6 January – The children's supernatural comedy series Rentaghost makes its debut on BBC1.
  - 2 October – The first edition of Saturday morning children's magazine show Multi-Coloured Swap Shop is broadcast to compete with ITV's Tiswas. It runs throughout the morning on BBC1.
- 1978
  - 8 February – The first episode of school drama Grange Hill is broadcast on BBC1. It would run until 2008.
  - The Watch with Mother title is dropped as it was considered to be dated.

== 1980s ==
- 1980
  - 1 October – BBC1's lunchtime children's block is now called See Saw.
- 1981
  - 10 February – Alan Rogers animation Pigeon Street begins on BBC1. The series ran until December before repeats on BBC1 and BBC2 throughout the 1980s and early 1990s.
  - 16 September – Debut of the children's television series Postman Pat about a rural postman with a black and white cat written and created by John Cunliffe and voiced and narrated by Ken Barrie, and edited by Ivor Wood, the same director as most Filmfair programmes on BBC1, it was the first Woodland Animations Ltd. produced programme and, unusually by this time, did not have a copyright year on its credits.
- 1982
  - 27 March – The final edition of Saturday morning children's magazine show Multi-Coloured Swap Shop is broadcast.
  - 17 April – The BBC launches its first Summer Saturday morning magazine programme, Get Set. However, unlike its Winter counterpart, the Summer shows air only for the first half of the morning so that Grandstand can start at 10:55am to show live cricket and on the weeks that cricket is not being shown, a feature film is broadcast from around 11am until the start of Grandstand at 12:30pm.
  - 2 October – The first edition of Multi-Coloured Swap Shop Saturday morning replacement show Saturday Superstore is broadcast on BBC1. It adopts a similar format to its predecessor.
  - 1 November – All BBC-produced Welsh-language programming including children's programmes is transferred from BBC1 to the newly launched S4C channel.
- 1983
  - 17 February – Woodland Animations Ltd. introduces a new stop-motion animated series, Gran on BBC1, following the success of Postman Pat.
  - 30 May – The morning broadcast of Play School moves to the earlier time of 10:30am.
  - 19 September – Owing to the transfer of programmes for schools and colleges to BBC2, the morning broadcast of Play School moves to BBC1. It continues to air at 10:30am.
- 1984
  - 3 January – Computerised graphics begin to be shown as part of the children's continuity as a way of differentiating children's output from the rest of BBC1's programming. However, the actual programme continues to be introduced over the BBC1 globe.
  - 21 April – The Saturday Picture Show replaces Get Set as the BBC's Summer Saturday morning magazine programme. It begins at the earlier time of 8:45am.
  - 5 October – The first programme in the trilogy to be produced by Maddocks Cartoon Productions, The Family-Ness, makes its debut on BBC1.
  - 21 December – Crackerjack! ends after 29 series and nearly three decades.
- 1985
  - 29 March – Play School is shown in the afternoon for the final time.
  - 1 April – Bertha, a new stop-motion animated series from Woodland Animations, the team behind Postman Pat, makes its debut on BBC1 with three more episodes broadcast the following year.
  - 9 September – The weekday afternoon block of children's programming is rebranded as Children's BBC and for the first time it has an in-vision presenter. Previously, children's programming had been introduced by BBC1's team of regular duty announcers.
  - October – A weekday 20-minute slot of Gaelic children's programmes begins on BBC1 Scotland. The programmes are generally shown in term-time before Play School, starting at 10:10am.
- 1986
  - 6 January – Debut of the children's animated series and second programme in the trilogy to be produced by Maddocks Cartoon Productions, Jimbo and the Jet-Set on BBC1.
  - 27 March – Following the launch the previous Autumn of in-vision continuity for children's programmes, for the first time, in-vision presentation is introduced to holiday weekday morning children's programmes. The Easter period's ten programmes are presented by Roland Rat and are called Roland Rat's Easter Extravaganza.
  - 1 April – As part of the BBC's Drugwatch campaign, BBC1 airs It's Not Just Zammo, a Newsround special presented by John Craven and Nick Ross that seeks to warn younger viewers about the dangers of using drugs. The programme follows a recent drug abuse storyline in Grange Hill involving the character Zammo McGuire (played by Lee MacDonald), and features the launch of a version of the anti-drugs song "Just Say No" recorded by members of the Grange Hill cast.
  - 8 July – BBC1 Scotland launches their new weekday children's programme for the Scottish school Summer holidays, billed as C.T.V.1, presented by Ross King and Rhoda McLeod as an opt-out of Pages from Ceefax between 9:20am and 10:20am, concluding on 25 July.
  - 28 July–29 August – Children's BBC switches to the traditional morning Summer block of programmes. Included is a series of special Newsround programmes called Newsround Special Edition, which tours the UK with the Radio 1 Roadshow.
  - 4–29 August – Due to Children's BBC moving to mornings, the afternoon children's slot is dropped for this period. Much of the slot is replaced with a repeat of Fame.
  - 27 October – BBC1 starts a full daytime television service. This includes a new morning programme block for children, which lasts for 30 minutes. In addition to the continued broadcasting of Play School, a birthday slot is introduced along with a cartoon. The change also sees the lunchtime children's programme begin at the slightly later time of 1:50pm.
- 1987
  - 18 April – The final edition of Saturday Superstore is broadcast on BBC1.
  - 25 April – It's Wicked replaces The Saturday Picture Show as the BBC's Summer Saturday morning magazine programme. It runs for just the one series.
  - 22 June – The BBC's lunchtime children's block moves from BBC1 to BBC2. It is shown slightly earlier, at 1:20pm.
  - 3 July – But First This launches as BBC1's new weekday school holidays children's programming block. Described as "a sort of magazine between the programmes", it airs each weekday during the holidays between 9:05am and 12 noon.
  - 26 September – Debut of Going Live!, a new live magazine show, broadcast on BBC1 and presented by Phillip Schofield and Sarah Greene.
  - 11 October – A new Sunday morning children's block Now on Two launches. It is broadcast between October and January during the Open University off-season.
- 1988
  - 23 April–10 September – Two Saturday morning magazine programmes are shown this Summer: On the Waterfront is aired for the first part of the season with UP2U taking over in mid-July.
  - 12 September – Debut of Stoppit and Tidyup on BBC1, a 13-part animated series narrated by Terry Wogan and partly funded by the Tidy Britain Group charity.
  - 16 October – Play School is broadcast for the final time. The last new edition had been shown in March.
  - 17 October – Playbus, the replacement programme for Play School, airs for the first time.
  - 20 October – Debut of the 13-part children's stop-motion animated series Charlie Chalk, produced by Woodland Animations Ltd (the company behind Postman Pat) on BBC1, featuring the voices of Barbara Leigh-Hunt, Michael Williams and John Wells. The last three episodes will air the following year.
- 1989
  - 22 April–16 September – Once again, two Saturday morning magazine programmes are shown this Summer and, as with the previous year, On the Waterfront aired for the first part of the season with UP2U taking over in mid-July.
  - 22 June – After more than 17 years, John Craven steps down as presenter of Newsround.
  - 8 October – The Sunday morning children's block shown during the Open University off-season is expanded. It starts at 7.30am and is rebranded as Children's BBC Two.
  - 8 November – The first episode of Byker Grove is broadcast. The teen drama, set in a youth club, will run for the next 17 years.
  - 25 December – Playbus is renamed Playdays.

== 1990s ==
- 1990
  - 21 April – The BBC reverts to airing just one Summer Saturday morning magazine show and replaces On the Waterfront and UP2U with a new series, The 8:15 from Manchester, named after its start time and its broadcast location.
- 1991
  - 18 February – BBC Scotland's live children's magazine programme Breakout is aired as a one-off show presented by Ashley Jensen and Bill Petrie to coincide with Scottish schools’ half-term break, it is aired on BBC1 Scotland at 10:05am–10:35am. It returns on 29 March to coincide with the Scottish schools' Easter holiday break, airing in an earlier timeslot of 9:05am–9:55am and again for a week beginning 1 July.
  - 9 September – New idents are launched featuring the BBC corporate logo.
  - 26 September – Debut of the gameshow Get Your Own Back, presented by Dave Benson Phillips. It would run until 2004.
- 1992
  - 26 March – The final original episode of the pre-school educational series You and Me is broadcast, although repeats continue to be aired until 1995.
  - 25 April – Parallel 9 replaces The 8:15 from Manchester as BBC1's Saturday morning Summer magazine programme.
  - 29 June–10 July – BBC Scotland launch their own regional version of Children's BBC with a brand new school Summer holiday programming block called The Ice Cream Van, presented by a team of three consisting of Dotaman's John Urquhart, Di Christie and Steve McKenna who alternated with each other every three days by taking on the presenting role by touring around Scotland in the show's Ice Cream Van.
- 1993
  - 17 April – The final edition of the Saturday morning programme Going Live! airs.
  - 5 July – Children's BBC Scotland returns to BBC1 Scotland for the first week of the Scottish school Summer holidays, now presented by Grant Stott.
  - 2 October – A new Saturday morning programme, Live & Kicking, makes its debut on BBC1, presented by Andi Peters, Emma Forbes and John Barrowman.
  - 18 October – Children's BBC Scotland airs on BBC1 Scotland between 9:05am and 10:35am in the second week of the half-term holidays until 22 October.
- 1994
  - 4 July – Children's BBC Scotland returns for a third year on BBC1 Scotland, the Scottish Summer holiday slot is still presented by Grant Stott for the first week of the school holidays, airing between 9:05am and 10:35am until 8 July.
  - 5 September – The idents get a refresh with new 3D graphics.
  - 17–21 October – BBC Scotland airs a regional version of the Children's BBC Breakfast Show between 7am and 8am on BBC2 Scotland throughout the half-term holidays.
- 1995
  - 21 April – At the end of its 42nd series, the final edition of Why Don't You? is broadcast. The programme ends after nearly 22 years on air. Repeats of the pre-school educational series You and Me end around the same time.
  - 22 April – Fully Booked replaces Parallel 9 as BBC1's Saturday morning Summer magazine programme.
  - 3 July – Children's BBC Scotland returns to BBC1 Scotland, still presented in-vision between 9:05am and 10:35am. Long-serving presenter Grant Stott is now joined by new co-host Gail Porter to introduce children's entertainment for the first week of the school holidays until 7 July. Grant and Gail also return to host the Children's BBC Breakfast Show on BBC Two Scotland between 7:15am and 8:25am in the second week of the school holidays from 16–20 October. The mid-morning slot on BBC1 Scotland returns to out-of-vision continuity between 9:05am and 10am across the same week.
  - 9 October – Children's programmes begin to be shown on BBC2 during the peak breakfast period and the block is called the Children's BBC Breakfast Show.
  - Blue Peter is now shown three times a week, on Mondays, Wednesdays and Fridays.
- 1996
  - 24 March – After more than 30 years on air, the final edition of storytelling series Jackanory is broadcast, although it would be briefly revived in 2006.
  - 10 June–23 August – For the Summer period, the late afternoon block of children's programmes aired on BBC1 is transferred to BBC2 owing to the coverage of the Wimbledon Championships.
  - 3 July – The Children's BBC Breakfast Show on BBC2 Scotland is presented by Grant Stott and Gail Porter throughout the opening weeks of the Scottish school Summer holidays, airing between 7:30am and 8:35am until 12 July then returning for a further week at the same timeslot between 14 and 18 October. The slot is aired on BBC1 Scotland between 9:20am and 10:20am, albeit still out-of-vision.
  - 21 September – Zoe Ball and Jamie Theakston become the new presenters of Live & Kicking.
- 1997
  - 28 March – The final episode of Playdays is broadcast. Repeats continue past the launch of CBeebies until they end in 2004.
  - 31 March – The first episode of Teletubbies airs on BBC2, the same day as children's programming forming part of Channel 5's breakfast block called Milkshake! is launched.
  - 30 June – BBC2 Scotland launches a brand new Summer holiday children's programme called Up For It!, airing between 8:35am and 9:30am for the first three weeks of the Scottish school holidays until 18 July, the show is presented by Gail Porter and featured episodes of the Smurfs' Adventures that aired to Scottish viewers a month earlier before it is shown in the rest of the UK. Up For It! returned for another run the following Summer with Marsali Stewart on hosting duties. The second series aired between 29 June and 17 July 1998.
  - 4 October – The new BBC corporate logo comes into use and new idents featuring various animations on a yellow background is now officially called CBBC.
- 1998
  - 17 August – BBC Two Scotland opts out of the network schedule to air classic films and some children's series in the slot between 9am and 12 noon.
  - 23 September – The BBC launches BBC Choice, its first new TV channel since 1964, available only on digital TV services. Children's programming forms part of the output from the start, airing on weekend afternoons as CBBC Choice and included programmes like Dog & Dinosaur, The Crew Room, L&K Replay and Re:Peter.
- 1999
  - 12 April – Long-running children's animated television series Bob the Builder begins on BBC One, filmed in stop-motion.
  - 6 September – The pre-school series Tweenies makes its debut on BBC Two at 10:30am following Teletubbies and again at 3:25pm on BBC One.
  - 29 November – From this day, children's programming is broadcast all day on BBC Choice. Branded CBBC on Choice, the programming block is on the channel every day from 6am to 7pm. Aimed at young children, with presentation links pre-recorded by a CBBC presenter. It includes repeats of archive shows rarely seen on the main channels.

== 2000s ==
- 2000
  - 3 July – CBBC Scotland is aired on BBC Two Scotland for the final time as a Summer holiday opt-out from the network, airing with an out-of-vision presenter between 10:50am and 12 noon until 7 July.
  - 23 September – The final edition of Fully Booked is broadcast. This brings to an end an almost 20-year run of BBC One and Two Summer-only Saturday morning children's magazine shows.
  - 7 October – Live & Kicking returns with a new look and became the first Saturday morning magazine show on BBC One to air all year round.
- 2001
  - 15 September – Live & Kicking comes to an end after eight years. The final edition is presented by Sarah Cawood, Heather Suttie, Ortis Deley and Trey Farley.
  - 22 September – The first episode of The Saturday Show airs, presented by Dani Behr and Joe Mace.
- 2002
  - 11 February – Two new BBC children's channels, CBeebies (aimed at children under 6) and CBBC (aimed at children aged 6–12) launch. The new channel sees the launch of through-the-day editions of Newsround and the introduction of weekend editions. Newsround Showbiz is also launched at around the same time. This also coincided with new idents known as the Bugs.
  - 1 September – Smile makes its debut on BBC Two, presented by Devin Griffin, Fearne Cotton and Reggie Yates.
  - 2 September – The Scottish children's series Balamory makes its debut on CBeebies.
- 2004
  - 1 January – The final episode of the gameshow Get Your Own Back airs after a 13 year run.
  - 8 March – Children's CGI character control game show Bamzooki airs on CBBC for the first time.
- 2005
  - 3 September – Following several revamps and presenting changes, BBC One airs the final edition of The Saturday Show.
  - 10 September – Sportsround, a weekly spin-off from CBBC children's news programme Newsround is launched. The sports magazine show was broadcast on Fridays at 6:30pm on CBBC and on Saturday mornings on BBC Two.
  - 30 September – CBBC's identity is relaunched, with its second new look since the launch of the CBBC Channel, known as the Green Gumdrop.
  - 5 October – The 6am CBeebies programming block on BBC Two ends and is replaced by an hour of Pages from Ceefax.
  - 21 December – The BBC announces that it is to trial a three-month experiment in which its Saturday morning schedules for BBC One and BBC Two will be swapped. The changes, taking effect from January 2006, are being implemented because of frequent scheduling changes caused by big events and breaking news stories and will mean children's programming will be absent from BBC One's Saturday morning line-up for the first time since 1976.
  - Newsround Showbiz ends after three years on the air.
  - CBBC Extra launches on the BBC Red Button.
- 2006
  - 10 December – The 344th and final episode of Byker Grove is broadcast. The teen drama, set in a youth club, ends after 17 years.
  - 25 December – The weekday 6am CBeebies programming block on BBC Two is reintroduced.
- 2007
  - May – It is announced that Blue Peter will be aired twice a week. The BBC argues that by dropping one show, the quality of the programme's content will improve.
  - 3 September – CBBC launches another new look with a stylised ident.
  - 20 October – BBC Switch, a teenage block of shows is launched to cater for the under-served 12 to 16-year-olds.
  - 1 December – BBC HD channel is officially launched after around eighteen months of trial broadcasts.
  - 25 December – BBC iPlayer, an online service for watching previously aired shows, is launched.
- 2008
  - 11 February – CBBC on BBC One is shifted to run from 3:05pm to 5:15pm rather than 3:25pm to 5:35pm to accommodate The Weakest Link moving from BBC Two to BBC One. The changes are made following the BBC's loss of the rights to the soap opera Neighbours, which had for many years been broadcast between the end of CBBC and the start of the 6 o'clock news.
  - 20 March – The remit of CBBC is altered to remove the schools programming element from the channel.
  - 15 September – BBC One airs the 601st and final episode of Grange Hill after a 30-year run.

== 2010s ==
- 2010
  - 10 September – The idents get a slight refresh and the CBBC logo is given a 3D glossy look.
  - 11 December – The final episode of Sportsround is broadcast after five years on the air. It is replaced by a new sports show Match of the Day Kickabout that airs in its original BBC Two slot on Saturday mornings.
  - 18 December – BBC Switch is switched off.
- 2011
  - May – CBBC is relocated to BBC Bridge House at MediaCityUK in Salford Quays.
  - September – Blue Peter relocates to its new home at MediaCityUK.
  - November – Newsround begins broadcasting from MediaCityUK.
- 2012
  - 12 January – Blue Peter is now only broadcast once a week for the first time since 1964 and for the first time in the show's history, first-run episodes were now broadcast on the CBBC Channel at 5:45pm on Thursdays. However, a repeat was still broadcast the following day on BBC One.
  - 21 December – CBBC and CBeebies both air on BBC One for the last time.
- 2013
  - 4 January – CBBC and CBeebies both air on BBC Two for the last time.
  - 10 December – HD broadcasts begin for CBBC and CBeebies.
- 2014
  - 13 September – A new set of CBBC idents launches while keeping the existing logo.
- 2015
  - 9 September – The CBBC Channel airs a 60-minute programme celebrating thirty years of The Broom Cupboard, the studio from which CBBC continuity programming was broadcast. The programme features past CBBC presenters, including Andi Peters, Phillip Schofield, Zoë Ball and Edd the Duck.
- 2016
  - 14 March – A new CBBC logo appears alongside new idents.
  - 11 April – CBBC extends its broadcast hours from 7pm to 9pm, using capacity that had previously been used by BBC Three that went off the air in February.
  - CBBC Extra, which had been broadcast on the BBC Red Button since 2005, ends.
- 2017
  - 30 September – CBBC programming returns to BBC Two on Saturday mornings when Saturday Mash-Up! is launched in an attempt to recapture the spirit of classic CBBC programmes such as Going Live! and Live & Kicking.

== 2020s ==
- 2020
  - 17 January – 35 years after it was last on air, Crackerjack returns. However, only two ten-part series are made and the show ends after its 2020–21 run.
  - 28 July – The BBC axes the teatime edition of Newsround after 48 years after concluding that the typical child no longer turns on traditional television channels when they return home from school. They will focus on the morning edition instead, which will be aimed at schools, where it is often used by teachers in classrooms, in addition to investing in the programme's website.
- 2021
  - 27 March – Match of the Day Kickabout is broadcast for the final time.
- 2022
  - 5 January – The relaunch of BBC Three sees CBBC’s hours reduced, ending its broadcast day two hours earlier, at 7pm instead of 9pm. Consequently, both of the BBC's children's channels now end their day at 7pm.
  - 3 September – CBeebies programming returns on Saturdays on BBC Two at 6:35am, with CBBC programming moving to 7:20am. The Saturday morning strand is officially branded as the Saturday Kids Zone (often known as The Best of CBBC, The Best of CBeebies, Saturday Morning Kids Zone or simply the Kids Zone).
- 2023
  - 15 March – CBBC and CBeebies's on-screen bugs and identity are rebranded to match the BBC's 2021 logo. CBBC also has the new mascots named the Flooms (the square, snake-like cylinders), while on CBeebies has a new refresh to the channel's iconic yellow bug mascots for giving their square forms.
- 2026
  - 20 April – Balamory returns to CBeebies for a new series over two decades after it was originally aired.

== See also ==
- Timeline of children's television on ITV
- Timeline of children's television on other British TV channels
