= The DJ Kat Show =

Children's animated television series

Production
- Running time: 60 minutes

Original release
- Network: Sky One; Sky One Undun
- Release: 1 September 1986 – 18 October 1996

The DJ Kat Show (Then: Sky One Undun) is a children's television programme presented by the puppet DJ Kat and his friend Linda de Mol, which ran from 1 September 1986 to 18 October 1996. The show was first broadcast to Europe on satellite and cable channel Sky Channel and later on Sky One and Sky Europe. The show was aired every weekday morning and afternoon (and in later years, at weekends), and throughout its life was home to a particularly large number of imported animated series. A separate version of The DJ Kat Show was later created for the United States where it was aired on stations affiliated with the Fox Broadcasting Company, including WNYW, Fox's flagship station. This article focuses primarily on the original European version then Sky One Undun.

== History ==
The original European version was produced by John de Mol's production house John de Mol Produkties, which later became Endemol (Linda de Mol is John de Mol's sister). All the linking material between the various cartoons was filmed in Hilversum, the Netherlands and written by Joost Timp.

== DJ Kat ==
DJ Kat was a puppet with a black leather jacket who loved spinning his records. He also liked to eat junk from the trash cans. His favorite dish was a jar of peas and carrots mashed together and his favorite drink was milk in a dirty glass. In the intro of the show DJ Kat would say the following line: "This is the DJ Kat show and I am DJ Kat...that's my name. It's a D and a J and a Kat with a K." The reason it is spelled with a K is because the Dutch spell cat with a k and Linda de Mol is Dutch. DJ Kat was originally performed by puppeteer Robert 'Robbie' Hahn. DJ Kat often claimed to be on a project for Millhouse. The Millhouse character is never shown on the show. British puppeteer Don Austen, who was already employed by Sky as Wally Blubb The Walrus on their Fun Factory weekend morning show, took over the character for a further 5 years (1989–95) for more than 2000 episodes on Sky One. The show picked up the PACE Satellite Award.

== The Linda de Mol/Steffanie Pitt/Catrina Hylton-Hull years (1986–1992) ==
Linda de Mol was DJ Kat's side-kick when the series began in September 1986. Later she would also branch out into German television and hosted more Endemol's programmes, including the original Dutch version of Deal or No Deal.

When Sky Channel decided to focus solely on broadcasting in the United Kingdom instead of Europe in early 1989, the production of the DJ Kat show moved from Hilversum to Blackbird Productions in London. de Mol's last episode (which was shot on location in Austria) was shown on Friday 3 February 1989. The next Monday, 6 February, Steffanie Pitt (aka "Steffie"), daughter of actress Ingrid Pitt, introduced herself as her replacement. Another puppet character, a scouse mouse called 'Yummy Tickle Mouse' was also added to the programme. Pitt left on 8 September of the same year, ostensibly to join the fictional all-female band 'The Sweet Potatoes'.

Hahn swiftly rejoined Linda de Mol back in the Netherlands for the very similar TROS television programme De Billy Hotdog Show, the main differences being that the title character was a dog and the show broadcast only once a week.

Catrina Hylton-Hull (aka "Treen"), stepdaughter of Rod Hull, made her first appearance on 11 September 1989 after numerous auditions. The programme did sketches around this time in an attempt to save its flagging format.

Catrina Hylton-Hull lasted three years and proved quite popular with fans of the series initially, but with viewing figures falling, Sky One came close to pulling the plug on the series. The acclaimed UK production/direction team of Patricia Mordecai, John Northover and Gale Claydon (who produced many series on ITV in the 1980s and 90s) were tasked with the job of creating a new look for the series, intended to begin in 1992. Hylton-Hull was initially contracted to continue as presenter with a "rotating" guest cast, but disagreements between her and the new production team about the direction of the new format saw her eventually opt to resign as presenter in mid-June 1992.

== Second incarnation (1992–1995) ==
After Catrina Hylton-Hull left the show in 1992, the series was totally revamped, and an all-new studio set, theme tune and titles came into being. The revamped show aired for the first time on 13 July 1992 after a three-week gap (the show's cartoon line-up carried on as normal, but continuity was changed to a simple card reading "DJ Kat - on hols, back in ... weeks" at each advert break during this time).

The regular co-presenters of the show's second incarnation were - initially - West End actor Simon Jermond and singer Marcelle Duprey (also known as "Marcie"), with Joe Greco as a stand-in host. Jermond left the series in July 1993 after just one year, having decided that television presenting was not for him, and Joe Greco replaced him on a full-time basis until the series ended in 1995. Alison Way, Peter Corey, David 'Saint' Rubin and future British soap star Jacqueline Pirie were also regularly featured as "guest stars" in various guises. New "game" slots (including 'Katz Alley' and 'Joke Machine') were also introduced for viewers to phone in and compete in, with prizes up for grabs.

The new format initially helped to revive the viewing figures with Don Austen, Joe Greco, and Marcelle Duprey continuing to perform through to 1995 with a now staggering output scriptwise. In September 1994, a Saturday spin-off show, 'KTV', was added to production, replacing Sky One's Fun Factory line-up. The new programme placed a greater emphasis on documentary-style features for kids and full-blown sketch parodies - most notably, the General Hospital spoof 'General Accident' and EastEnders take-off 'Arthur Square', both of which saw a then-unknown Jacqueline Pirie putting her acting talents (and flair for adopting English accents) to good use. A Sunday DJ Kat Show was also eventually produced, featuring the puppet and usually just Joe Greco presenting.

== Cancellation (1995) ==
By 1995, viewing figures had begun to fall once again, at which point series editor Michelle Kimber, writers Peter Corey and Dave Arthur, director John Northover and production team Patricia Mordecai, Michael Kerrigan and Gale Claydon reported that they all felt the series had now run its course; in August 1995 chief producers David Drewery and Paul Cole announced that they had decided against both revamping the format for a second time and re-commissioning the series, and Sky One announced that series would be cancelled at the end of the year.

John Northover has since cited that the main reason for the falling viewing figures was largely due to the fact that series writers had simply run out of ideas for new scripts and had begun recycling old ones.

The final episode was aired on 31 December 1995 and replaced in January 1996 by a short-lived new breakfast TV series, Boiled Egg & Soldiers, which struggled to gain a foothold.

=== American version ===
An American version of The DJ Kat Show debuted on WNYW in New York City on 28 November 1987. The series, which was set against the backdrop of a makeshift clubhouse in the basement of the television station, had the wisecracking cat puppet and his comedy assistant, Elizabeth Rose, reading viewers mail and engaging in comedy skits in between reruns of Woody Woodpecker and Looney Tunes movie cartoons. DJ Kat always wanted to be "the star" and did everything to convince "the boss" (TV station owners) that he was the "biggest star" of the television station. Comic actor and puppeteer Jim Martin created the American version, manipulated, and voiced the "DJ Kat" character. Steve Howard was the producer who also contributed to the writing. The wrap-arounds were story-arc'd. As time went on, the cartoons were edited to allow room for more live-action. Martin and Rose would leave the series and entertainer/songwriter/scriptwriter and puppeteer Craig Marin and comic actress and mimic Carmen De La Paz would succeed the previous pair as the series' second and last hosts/performers.

The DJ Kat Show was seen on Saturday mornings until 26 December 1987, shifting the next week to a Sunday morning timeslot. The cartoons were dropped and the programs focused on stories that had DJ and "Jennifer Davis" (De La Paz) trying to host the show despite problems created by their stingy and mean boss "Mr. Midas G. Merkle" and other troublemakers.

The DJ Kat Show would remain on WNYW until 24 December 1988. DJ and the other Flexitoon puppets would be seen in wraparound segments during the station's weekday afternoon cartoon programming from then until March 1991 (around the time the Fox Kids Network launched on weekdays).

== Sky One Undun ==
Sky One Undun is a children's television programme, which ran from 1 November 1995 (Takes Over Launched) and 3 January 1996 (Kids Morning Block) to 18 October 1996. The show was first broadcast to Europe on satellite and cable channel Sky One.

=== Programmes ===
- Mighty Morphin Power Rangers
- Double Dragon
- The Transformers
- Teenage Mutant Hero Turtles (UK title)
- Conan and the Young Warriors
- Highlander: The Animated Series
- The Adventures of Dodo

After The DJ Kat Show ended, they modified the tombstone Sky One ident for a new kids block called Sky One Undun, which ran from 1 November 1995 (Takes Over Launched) and 3 January 1996 (Kids Morning Block) to 18 October 1996. It ended due to the majority of Sky's kids programmes moving to Fox Kids Network upon its launch on 19 October 1996.

=== Timeline of Sky One Undun Former Logos and Idents history ===
- Sky One Undun - Opening - Ident 1 (1 November 1995 – 31 August 1996, First Era: 3 January 1996 – 31 August 1996) (Then: Sky One Undun - Caterpillar - Ident (1 September 1996 – 18 October 1996))
- Sky One Undun - Opening - Ident 2 (1 November 1995 – 31 August 1996, First Era: 3 January 1996 – 31 August 1996)
- Sky One Undun - Opening - Ident 3 (3 January 1996 – 31 August 1996)
- Sky One Undun - Time for Undun - Ident (1 November 1995 – 31 August 1996, First Era: 3 January 1996 – 18 October 1996)
- Sky One Undun - Caterpillar - Ident (1 November 1995 – 18 October 1996, First Era: 3 January 1996 – 18 October 1996)
- Sky One Undun - Sailboat - Ident (3 January 1996 – 18 October 1996)
- Sky One Undun - Spaghetti - Ident (3 January 1996 – 18 October 1996)
- Sky One Undun - From You Flowers - Ident (3 January 1996 – 18 October 1996)
- Sky One Undun - Sky One (UK) - Sky One Undun Break Bumper (1 November 1995 – 31 August 1996, First Era: 3 January 1996 – 31 August 1996)

== Cartoons aired on the show ==
- Goober and the Ghost Chasers
- The Hot Rod Dogs and Cool Car Cats
- Harlem Globetrotters
- Hurricanes
- The Transformers
- Mighty Orbots
- Fireman Sam
- Jem
- Scooby's All Star Laff-A-Lympics
- Sherlock Hound
- The World of David the Gnome
- Biker Mice from Mars
- George of the Jungle
- James Bond Jr
- Felix the Cat
- Paddington Bear
- Fraidy Cat
- Rude Dog and the Dweebs
- Count Duckula
- Charlie Chalk
- Hulk Hogan's Rock 'n' Wrestling
- Dinosaucers
- Help!... It's the Hair Bear Bunch!
- DuckTales
- Henry's Cat
- M.A.S.K.
- Alvin and the Chipmunks
- Teenage Mutant Ninja Turtles (UK Title: Teenage Mutant Hero Turtles)
- The Care Bears Family (UK Title: Care Bears)
- Denver, the Last Dinosaur
- Inspector Gadget
- Heathcliff
- Dick Tracy
- Little Clowns of Happytown
- Dragon's Lair
- Dungeons & Dragons
- Diplodo
- Dastardly and Muttley in Their Flying Machines (UK Title: Dastardly and Muttley)
- Darkwing Duck
- The Adventures of Super Mario Bros. 3
- Ulysses 31
- Widget the World Watcher
- Robotix
- Top Cat
- Wheelie and the Chopper Bunch
- Journey to the Center of the Earth
- Roger Ramjet
- Hong Kong Phooey
- Jayce and the Wheeled Warriors
- Far Out Space Nuts
- The Banana Splits Adventure Hour
- Postman Pat
- Saber Rider and the Star Sheriffs
- Sinbad Jr. and his Magic Belt
- Grimm's Fairy Tale Classics
- Skippy the Bush Kangaroo
- SuperTed
- The Super Mario Bros. Super Show!
- Silverhawks
- Thundercats
- Samurai Pizza Cats
- Phantom 2040
- Superboy
- Pound Puppies
- Lensman
- Dr. Splash
- BraveStarr
- He-Man and the Masters of the Universe
- She-Ra: Princess of Power
- G.I. Joe
- The World's Greatest Super Friends
- The Smurfs
- Little Wizards
- Yogi's Treasure Hunt
- Wacky Races
- Wish Kid
- Dennis the Menace (1959) (UK Title: Dennis)
- Dennis the Menace (1986) (UK Title: Dennis)
- The Adventures of the Little Prince
- Bump in the Night
- VR Troopers
- Orson and Olivia
- Swat Kats
- Mighty Max
- The Adventures of Gulliver
- Mighty Morphin Power Rangers
- X-Men: The Animated Series
- Amigo and Friends
- Dynamo Duck
- Teddy Trucks
- Incredible Dennis the Menace (UK Title: Incredible Dennis)
- My Little Pony
- Conan the Adventurer
- Mrs. Pepper Pot
- The Incredible Hulk
- Superhuman Samurai Syber-Squad
- Delfy and His Friends
- Double Dragon
- Transformers: Generation 2 (UK Title: The New Transformers)
- Spider-Man
- Saban's Adventures of Peter Pan
- Wild West C.O.W.-Boys of Moo Mesa
- Highlander: The Animated Series
- Ritter's Cove
