= Peter Pan: The Animated Series =

Anime series by Nippon Animation

- Title card
- ピーターパンの冒険
- Genre: Adventure, fantasy
- Based on: Peter and Wendy by J.M. Barrie
- Screenplay by: Michiru Shimada; Shun'ichi Yukimuro
- Directed by: Yoshio Kuroda
- Music by: Toshiyuki Watanabe
- Opening theme: "Mouchido Peter Pan" by Yuyu
- Ending theme: "Yume no Hirake Goma!" by Yuyu
- Country of origin: Japan
- Original language: Japanese
- No. of episodes: 41

Production
- Executive producer: Koichi Motohashi
- Producers: Shigeo Endō; Yoshihisa Tachikawa (Fuji TV)
- Production companies: Fuji Television; Nippon Animation

Original release
- Network: FNS (Fuji TV)
- Release: January 15 – December 24, 1989

Peter Pan: The Animated Series (ピーターパンの冒険, Pītā Pan no Bōken; lit. The Adventures of Peter Pan) is a Japanese animated TV series produced by Nippon Animation and directed by Yoshio Kuroda, which first aired in Japan on Fuji Television between January 15 and December 24, 1989, and is also popular in the United Kingdom.

== Outline ==
An adaptation of the classic Peter Pan and Wendy novel by J.M. Barrie, the series spanned a total of 41 episodes. It was originally scheduled to be broadcast on 8 January 1989, but due to the death of Emperor Shōwa, the premiere was postponed for a week.

It was part of the World Masterpiece Theater, a famed animation staple by Nippon Animation, which produced an animated version of a different fairy tale or work of classic literature each year. The production was made with the cooperation of the Kadokawa Bunko edition of the novel and London's Great Ormond Street Hospital, which holds the rights to J. M. Barrie's Peter Pan.

The series, while adapting material from the original novel, also adds numerous original story arcs. In the usual case of the World Masterpiece Theater, the stage is a real world, and the main character is often exposed to terrible circumstances such as being an orphan or being raised by a single-parent family, and it tends to have a gloomy atmosphere. This work is a rare case; the stage is a fictional world, and although it is a story of adventure and battle, it has a bright atmosphere. Compared to other series in the franchise, the story is loosely adapted from the book, adding an entirely original second act focused on the new character of Princess Luna. The series is also notable for the presence of Rascal from Rascal the Raccoon, making it the only series in the World Masterpiece Theater franchise to contain a crossover.

The series was later translated and released by Saban Entertainment in several international territories worldwide in 1990, sometimes under the name Peter Pan: The Animated Series. In Europe, it was broadcast on Telecinco in Spain, SIC in Portugal, RTL Television, Italia 1, Canale 5 and Rete 4 in Italy, TV3 (Sweden) and Fox Kids in Sweden and Norway, REN TV in Russia, TRT in Turkey, Alter Channel in Greece and TVP 2 in Poland. It also aired in numerous other countries, such as TVNZ2 in New Zealand, IETV and Fox Kids in Israel, Rede Globo in Brazil, XHGC in Mexico, kykNET in South Africa, AVM in Trinidad and Tobago, ABS-CBN in the Philippines, Channel 3 in Thailand, Sky One's Fun Factory in the United Kingdom and Spacetoon in Indonesia.

== Plot ==
The series starts with Wendy having a dream about Peter Pan rescuing her and having a swordfight with Captain Hook. Later on, Wendy and her two brothers, John and Michael, fly to Neverland, and Wendy becomes the 'mother' of the Lost boys. Throughout the series, a romance blooms between Peter and Wendy, as they go on fights with pirates.

The last half of the series deviates from the original storyline, in a total of three camps (Peter Pan, Captain Hook and Sinistra). Two new characters (Sinistra and Luna) become an important part of the last episodes.

== Characters ==
=== Peter Pan's side (main quartet) ===
- Peter Pan (ピーター・パン, Pītā Pan)

Voiced by: Noriko Hidaka
The series' protagonist, who is short-tempered, but accepts what his friends say. He has the strong belief that he will not forgive anyone who violates freedom, and fights to keep Neverland a free and liveable world.
However, he is indifferent to the disputes between the members and leaves it entirely to Wendy to resolve them.

- Wendy Moira Angela Darling (ウェンディ・モイラー・アンジェラ・ダーリング, Wendi Moirā Anjera Dāringu)

Voiced by: Naoko Matsui
The eldest of the Darling children, a feisty, kind, clever, jolly tomboy who is capable of helping her family and friends defy Captain Hook's forces. She is liked by other menbers and called "Mom Wendy", and is seen as everyone's caretaker.

- John Julian Darling (ジョン・ジュリアン・ダーリング, Jon Jurian Dāringu)

Voiced by: Kyōko Hamura
The elder of Wendy's two brothers, who is always getting into some kind of trouble.

- Michael Darling (マイケル・ダーリング, Maikeru Dāringu)

Voiced by: Yuriko Fuchizaki
The younger of Wendy's two brothers, who shows a great deal of courage for his age.

=== Residents of Neverland ===
- Tinker Bell (ティンカー・ベル, Tinkā Beru)

Voiced by: Sumi Shimamoto
A fairy who is one of Peter's companions, she is abbreviated as "Tink" (ティンク, Tinku).

- Curly (カーリー, Kārī)

Voiced by: Yūko Mita
A lost boy, who is small and wears a pot on his head. While sleeping, he always falls out of bed.

- Slightly (スライトリー, Suraitorī)

Voiced by: Hiroko Emori
One of the Lost Boys, who wears a wide white coat and a white cap with rabbit ears hanging down. He is an inventor and is good at crafts, but has a cold personality.

- Tootles (トートルズ, Tōtoruzu)

Voiced by: Kazue Ikura
One of the Lost Boys, who is tall but has gloomy and clumsy personalities, so he is sometimes ridiculed and bullied by the other members as a result. He accidentally shoots Wendy down when Tink tricks him into shooting her.

- Tiger Lily (タイガーリリー, Taigā Rirī)

Voiced by: Maria Kawamura
A tomboyish Indian princess that John falls in love with.

- Crocodile Watch (時計ワニ, Tokei Wani)

When Peter fought Captain Hook long ago, Hook's right hand was bitten off by a crocodile. Ever since then, he's been trying to eat the rest of him. The crocodile also happened to have swallowed a clock, which is the cause of the ticking sound that accompanies him.

- Rascal (ラスカル, Rasukaru)

A raccoon who often visits Peter Pan's House.

- Mermaids (人魚達, Ningyo-tachi)

Mermaids who are friends of Peter Pan.

=== Captain Hook's side ===
- Captain Hook (フック船長, Fukku Senchō)

Voiced by: Chikao Ōtsuka
The first villain, and leader of the pirates, who tries his hardest to defeat Peter Pan. His right hand is a hook. Although he is the pirate captain, he is very clumsy.

- Smee (スミー, Sumī)

Voiced by: Kenichi Ogata
An old pirate who serves under Captain Hook, but has a kind personality, and is Hook's main helper.

- Bill (ビル, Biru)

Voiced by: Daisuke Gōri
A pirate and one of the strongest.

- Cecco (チェッコ, Chekko)

Voiced by: Kōichi Yamadera
The leader of the pirates when Hook is not around, and keeps many knives in his hat.

- Alf Menson (アルフ・メンソン, Arufu Menson)

Voiced by: Tesshō Genda
A pirate who wears an eyepatch, suggesting that he lost an eye at some point.

- Starky (スターキー, Sutākī)

Voiced by: Masato Hirano
A cowardly pirate.

- Robert (ロバート, Robāto)

Voiced by: Issei Futamata
A pirate in charge of Hook's artillery.

=== Sinistra's side ===
- Darkness (ダークネス, Dākunesu) (European version: Sinistra (シニストラ, Shinisutora))

Voiced by: Hisako Kyōda
The evil queen of darkness, who serves as the main antagonist later on in the series. She is a witch who attempts to extinguish freedom from Neverland, and regards both Peter Pan and Captain Hook as enemies. She has three henchmen that help her.

- Luna (ルナ, Runa)

Voiced by: Maria Kawamura
A powerful princess of light, with a dark and powerful alter-ego.

== Staff ==
- Director: Yoshio Kuroda
- Scenario: Michiru Shimada, Shun'ichi Yukimuro
- Character design: Takashi Nakamura
- Music: Toshiyuki Watanabe
- Sound director: Etsuji Yamada
- Animation director: Hirotsugu Kawasaki, Hirokazu Ishiyuki, Tomihiko Ōkubo, Megumi Kagawa, Kazushige Yusa, Hiroyuki Okiura, Moriyasu Taniguchi
- Art director: Masamichi Takano
- Producer: Shigeo Endō (Nippon Animation), Yoshihisa Tachikawa (Fuji Television)
- Planning: Shōji Satō (Nippon Animation), Kenji Shimizu (Fuji Television)
- Production management: Mitsuru Takakuwa, Junzō Nakajima (Nippon Animation)
- Production desk: Shun'ichi Kosao, Yasunori Tsukamoto (Nippon Animation)

== Theme songs ==
- Opening theme: Peter Pan Again (もう一度ピーターパン, Mōichido Pīta Pan)
- Ending theme: Dream, Open Sesame! (夢よ開けゴマ!, Yume yo Hirake Goma)
- Singer: Yukiko Iwai (Yūyu)
- Lyricist: Yasushi Akimoto
- Composer: Yoshimasa Inoue
- Arranger: Akira Nishihira

Since 1986, the singer of the theme song of the World Masterpiece Theater series has usually appeared in the main story (dubbing voice) or musical, but Yukiko Iwai, who sang theme song of this work, did not appear in both the main story and musical.

== Episodes ==
No.	Title	Original release date
1	"Come Quick! Everyone Admires Peter Pan" "Hayaku Kite! Minna no Akogare Pīta Pan" (早く来て！みんなの憧れピーターパン)	January 15, 1989
Siblings Wendy, John and Michael have the same dream about a scary pirate captain named Hook and a strange, flying boy named Peter Pan who saves them. The three children live a rather monotonous life in Victorian London: they go to school, and sneak laughs about their father at breakfast, but Peter Pan begins to infiltrate their life. They ask their mother about him, and go on a search in the library. They soon come to the conclusion that Peter Pan really exists and appears only to children, while he fades away from adults' memories. They start leaving their nursery window open, even though winter quickly approaches. Peter Pan indeed visits their nursery, but all three are asleep, despite their efforts to keep awake. Nana, the Darling family's dog and nursemaid, bites off the shadow of the intruder. Wendy wakes up, and frantically hides the strange object in a drawer. Peter Pan must return for his shadow, Wendy reasons, and she and her brothers eagerly await the next evening. Later in the day, Mr. Darling becomes angry with Nana and ties her up outside before leaving with his wife to a party. The children are alone and excited.
2	"Go! Go! Go to Neverland!" "Nebārando e Go! Go! Go!" (ネバーランドへGo！Go！Go！)	January 15, 1989
Peter Pan indeed comes looking for his shadow, helped by his faithful fairy friend, Tinker Bell. Wendy wakes up when he starts making a racket, pulling almost all the clothes out of her closet. He is very happy to find it, but cannot reattach it to himself. Tink offers to help with a bar of soap, but even with this "powerful substance", he cannot keep it attached. Peter is completely devastated and starts bawling, until Wendy approaches him. She sews it back on, and the boy gives her an acorn necklace as thanks. Wendy gives him a kiss, but this infuriates Tinker Bell (Tink stays angry at Wendy for about ten more episodes). Peter teaches the Darling children to fly and takes them to Neverland.
3	"The Pirates are Here! The Dream and Adventure Country Neverland" "Kaizoku ga Deta! Yume to Bōken no Kuni Nebārando" (海賊が出た！夢と冒険の国ネバーランド)	January 22, 1989
Wendy, John and Michael arrive in Neverland. Before Peter can take them home, Hook begins firing cannons at him. As Wendy heads after Tinker Bell to the tree house, the fairy tells the lost boys to shoot the 'Wendybird' down. Tootles hits her, realizes that he has shot down a girl, and faces Peter's "wrath". It turns out that Wendy is unharmed, as the arrow struck the acorn necklace that Peter gave her. The Darlings slowly become accustomed to living in the tree house, while the lost boys are mesmerized by how a good a mother Wendy is. Neverland seems all fun and games, until the pirates get close to the tree house at night. The lost boys prepare to defend themselves, but Peter has the territory covered.
4	"Appearance! Is the Clock Crocodile Captain Hook's Friend" "Tōjō! Tokei Wani wa Fukku Senchō no Tomodachi?" (登場！時計ワニはフック船長の友だち？)	January 29, 1989
John and Michael attempt to fly once again (unsuccessfully), but are saved by Peter just before they hit the ground. Afterwards, the Darlings and Lost Boys go looking for mermaids. After hours of waiting for the girls to appear, Slightly, Curly and John go looking for more adventure someplace else (preferably having to do with pirates). Upon their leaving, the mermaids take Michael and Wendy down into the water, and, being the only one else present, Tootles dives down and saves them. At the tree house, Tootles shows them a cute little raccoon named Rascal. Meanwhile, John gets his first look at the pirates and gets caught by them, along with Curly and Slightly. On the ship, Captain Hook appears for the first time and puts John up on a plank high above the water. Before he gets to laugh, Peter appears. Unable to fly away, with his friends held hostage and Hook coming at him with a sword, there seems to be no chance for Peter to get away alive, but fortunately for him, this episode also includes the first appearance of the ticking crocodile.
5	"Captain Hook Greatly Hates the Sound of the Sewing Machine!" "Fukku Senchō wa Mishin no Oto ga Dai Kirai!" (フック船長はミシンの音が大嫌い！)	February 5, 1989
While Peter 'modestly' presents his flying abilities to John and Michael, Tink decides to prove to the two gullible boys that Peter can also turn day to night. After Tink persuades them to close their eyes, Peter hangs a blanket above them. It doesn't take long for John to understand the prank that was played on him, but when he does come out from under the covers, Wendy is already enraged. After the lost boys fight over who gets to bring the blanket to her to stitch it up, Wendy tells them about a marvelous machine that makes sewing easy and quick. Slightly instantly goes to try building the contraption with Curly, but neither of them knows what such a machine even looks like. They really lose hope after Wendy inadvertently tells them that a sewing machine can't be made solely from wood, but Slightly is determined. Meanwhile, Hook gets irritated by Smee's off-key singing about mothers as he is sewing, as mothers are a touchy emotional subject for the captain. Smee is sequestered off to shore to continue his chore, which presents Slightly and Curly with the perfect opportunity to see a sewing machine in action. Although Smee is more grandfather than pirate, Hook's crew arrives on shore just as the two lost boys get comfortable.
6	"John's First Love? The Tomboy Appears" "Jon no Hatsu Koi? Otenbamusume Arawareru" (ジョンの初恋？おてんば娘現れる)	February 12, 1989
John is sick and tired of doing chores in the treehouse, and complains about having to wash the floor while Peter Pan amuses himself all day. He decides to join the pirates, on a whimsical suggestion from Tinker Bell. As he heads towards the ship, he meets the Indian princess Tiger Lily (in a rather violent encounter). She offers to present him to the Captain. On the pirate ship, Hook has sent off all the pirates to shore to celebrate his mother's birthday in peace. When John boards the ship, Hook is less than pleased with the aspiring buccaneer, and assigns him to wash the deck (John is, apparently, destined for cleaning jobs). Tiger Lily, who has sneaked onto the ship after John, suddenly attacks Hook from behind with a knife, intending to kill him. Luckily for Hook, Cecco returns and distracts the girl enough for Hook to subdue her. Tiger Lily, and John as her conspirator, are cast into the man-made sandpit for their insolence. Only Peter Pan can save them from here, but he does it without even flying.
7	"Wendy is Persistent! The Egg is Not Given to Anyone" "Uendi Ganbaru! Tamago wa Darenimo Natasanai" (ウェンディ頑張る！卵は誰にも渡さない)	February 19, 1989
Early one morning, Wendy follows Peter to see something new he has found. Beyond the flying crystals and the source of the rainbow, Peter brings Wendy to the Neverbird's nest. The boy wants to give it to Wendy as a present, but she refuses after finding out that the Neverbird laid one egg only every three years. Offended, Peter flies away, leaving Wendy with the egg. Soon, Tiger Lily comes looking for the egg, but Wendy hides it in the most unexpected place (so that even the pirates could not find it). Hook also wants the egg, to eat it and fulfill his desire for eternal youth. When the pirates see smoke up in the mountain from the girls' campfire, Hook goes up with Smee to investigate.
8	"A New Plan! Make the Crocodile Laugh!" "Sakusen Kaishi! Tokei Wani wo Warawasero!" (作戦開始！時計ワニを笑わせろ！)	February 26, 1989
Wendy wishes she had a clock to organize her household. Peter Pan immediately suggests extracting the clock inside the ticking crocodile. The ensuing silliness results in Capt. Hook losing his wardrobe, the crocodile being subjected to a Hook "puppet show", and a firing of projectiles full of laughing gas into the poor crocodile's jaws. Meanwhile, Hook is sure Peter's reason for trying to remove the clock is to eliminate the warning sound of the crocodile's approach, and starts getting a little psychotic.
9	"The Law of Neverland? Everyday is a Birthday!" "Nebārando no Hōritsu? Mainichi ga Tanjōbi da!" (ネバーランドの法律？毎日が誕生日だ！)	March 5, 1989
After celebrating Michael's birthday, Peter Pan declares every day everyone's birthday, and gives Wendy the task of baking five cakes for the occasion. Wendy complies only because she thinks this will make Peter happy. Peter, however, soon forgets all about his decision, and brushes her efforts off as an unimportant trifle compared to the new exciting adventure he just had. Wendy gets angry and locks herself up in the attic. John advises Peter to apologize, but this is something the boy can't imagine doing in any circumstances. When the two do talk, the situation only gets worse, and Wendy announces she wants to leave Neverland and runs out into the woods. Peter is chased out of the tree house by a mutinous band of Lost Boys, and is left to grapple with his conflicting self-pride and friendship to Wendy. A sacrifice of this pride must be made to get Wendy back, and piranhas only complicate the situation.
10	"Suspicious Behavior! The White Tailed John" "Ayashigena Kōdō! Jon wo Bikō Shiro" (怪しげな行動！ジョンを尾行しろ)	March 12, 1989
John wants to pursue a relationship with Tiger Lily and is interested in meeting her father. Only after being invited to her village does he find out that the Chief is a frightening man. John is extremely nervous the next day, but when he finally meets the Chief, he learns that Tiger Lily's father is a friendly, albeit imposing, man with a knack for singing British songs.
11	"A New Weapon! The Amphibious Cinderella's Carriage?" "Shin Heiki! Suiriku Ryōyō Shinderera no Basha?" (新兵器！水陸両用シンデレラの馬車？)	March 19, 1989
As Wendy is telling the story of Cinderella to the Lost Boys one night, they ask what a stepmother looks like. Since there are no old people in Neverland, Peter resorts to stealing Hook's treasured portrait of his mother to show them an old woman. Hook is furious when he finds the picture missing, and blames it all on Cecco, who fell asleep on the watch, as usual. The pirates all sympathize with their fellow pirate, and guess that it was only Peter Pan who could (or would) steal the portrait. They fail in their attempts to catch Peter, but they take Michael, and Wendy soon afterwards, as prisoners. Peter Pan has no choice but to give himself up, and everything looks pretty hopeless for a moment. Meanwhile, Slightly and Curly have been trying to build what they think is the carriage from the Cinderella story as a gift for Wendy, and this device happens to come in very handy in the dire situation.
12	"Even Pirates Run Away? Michael's Scary Story!" "Kaizoku Mo Nigeru? Maikeru no Kowai Hanashi!" (海賊も逃げる？マイケルの恐い話！)	March 26, 1989
It rains all day and everyone in the tree house is bored to tears. Peter Pan suggests a game of telling scary stories. Meanwhile, Alf and Robert are caught in the rain, and accidentally discover both the tree house and the secret entrance into it. They are soon hiding behind furniture, getting just as scared of Peter's story as John and the Lost Boys are. Wendy, hoping to scare Peter out of his pants, decides to load the deck and enlists Michael's help in creating a ghostly apparition. Both Peter and Wendy get more than they had bargained for in the end.
13	"The Rescue Mission Begins! Save Peter Pan" "Kyūshutsu Sakusen Kaishi! Pītā Pan wo Sukero" (救出作戦開始！ピーターパンを助けろ)	April 16, 1989
Captain Hook's lifelong wish comes true when he suddenly manages to catch Peter Pan. Wishing to inflict cruel and unusual punishment, Hook decides to feed Peter to the crocodile as an ultimate revenge on his nemesis. The crocodile fails to show up near the pirate ship for some time, however, giving Wendy and the Lost Boys a chance to try to rescue Peter. This plan ultimately fails, and Hook decides to give the boy the chance to execute him, but his plan is thwarted at the last second by a mysterious woman.
14	"The Demon in Snowroom Mountain and Michael's Courage" "Sunorumu Yama no Akumu to Maikeru no Yūki" (スノルム山の悪夢とマイケルの勇気)	April 23, 1989
One day Wendy is found sick in bed, and Peter goes to the Chief for help. Although the Chief does not desire to help him (because Peter played some annoying prank on him just the other day), Tiger Lily gives him a plant that should be boiled and drunk as medicine. By the time he arrives, forgetful Peter does not remember what the Chief's daughter had instructed him to do with the plant, so he makes up some foolish directions: water it for a thousand days until fruit starts growing on it. Michael knows Wendy would suffer for a long time before the plant was ready, so he decides to get ice to lower her high fever. He sets out with Tink for Ice Mountain, far away from home. All would have gone well, if Starkey and Alf hadn't crossed the little traveler's path. They, too, were getting ice for their sick Captain. When Michael comes back with the ice and snow in a jar, the heartless buccaneers snatch it from his very hands and walk away. Michael is left crying in the desert land, but Peter would avenge Michael, and both of them would cure Wendy.
15	"Hook Betrayed! Cecco Stopped Being a Pirate" "Fukku wo Uragire! Kaizoku wo Yameta Chekko" (フックを裏切れ！海賊をやめたチェッコ)	April 30, 1989
Annoyed by Cecco's unreliability at staying awake at the watch, Hook decides to put him in the man-made sandpit of death. After the pirates leave, Peter saves Cecco by catching him in mid-air as he falls through the bottom. When Peter returns to the tree house, the pathetic buccaneer comes trudging along with a white flag of truce. It turns out that he wants to become a lost 'boy', and, surprisingly, Peter allows him to join, but John has his doubts. Innocently mopping the floors by day, and telling secrets to the pirates at night, Cecco manages to pass as one of Peter's band.
16	"Wendy is Angry! Great Hate for Peter Pan" "Uendi Okoru! Pītā Pan te Dai Kirai" (ウェンディ怒る！ピーターパンて大嫌い)	May 7, 1989
Peter's band is having fun with giant lizards in a meadow, except for John, who faints three times. All the while, Wendy is annoyed by Peter's behavior in not keeping his promise to pick flowers with her. Before she knows it, Alf and Starkey catch her and take her on their boat. On their long journey back to Hook's ship, Starkey takes out a letter his sister had somehow mailed him. Starkey has such literacy problems that Wendy decides to read it to him and the teary-eyed Alf. She also starts telling them the story of Snow White when the letter mentions it, because the pirates do not recognize such a tale. After some time, the current begins to get rougher and faster, and Alf notices the waterfall up ahead. Starkey lassos a branch extending from a floating island and they are saved, while the boat is smashed between rocks. Once on land, Wendy finishes the story and is offered a strange fruit from Starkey as a sign of friendship, which Alf immediately criticizes as 'too nice'. Instantly, Wendy falls into a deep endless sleep, while the two pirates are left confused and helpless. When Peter arrives, though, Tink recognizes the fruit and claims there is an antidote that must be drunk by the victim before sunrise, but if Peter doesn't make it before sunrise, Wendy will remain asleep forever.
17	"John Can't Sleep! Catch the Spirit of Sleep" "Jon ga Nemure Nai! Nemuri no Sei wo Tsukamaero" (ジョンが眠れない！眠りの精を捕まえろ)	May 14, 1989
Wendy wakes up and finds an irritated John counting sheep with circles under his eyes from lack of sleep. He hasn't slept the entire night and gets annoyed easily. Then Peter remembers the strange music he once heard on Hook's ship that caused everyone to fall asleep instantly. Later, Smee tells Peter that the music was no spirit, but the Captain's harpsichord. He sneaks Peter onto Hook's ship and shows him the forbidden instrument. When Peter starts playing so loudly (and out of tune) that Hook comes barging in, Smee takes the blame so that Peter can escape, but the Captain is not deceived, and he makes an ingenious trap, so that if one should play a certain key on his harpsichord, the seat blows up. Wendy tries fooling Peter into thinking that John has fallen asleep, so that he wouldn't go back for the harpsichord and get into any more trouble, but she fails. Peter is determined to get John to sleep, but most importantly to annoy Hook.
18	"Tootles Shows Courage! Steal the Pirates' Flag" "Yūki wo Shimese Tōtoruzu! Kaizoku no Hata wo Ubae" (勇気を示せトートルズ！海賊の旗を奪え)	May 21, 1989
When Tootles takes a flower for Wendy, he almost causes his friends to fall from a floating island, and each of them, including Peter, are angry with him. They decide to leave him at home when they go on their adventures, and only Wendy is by his side. Then, when Tink introduces the idea of capturing Hook's flag to prove he is worthy to participate in Peter's adventures, Tootles and Wendy set off for the Captain's ship. When they get there, they find the flag gone from the mast, and decide to follow Smee on his rowboat. It happens that when Smee finished washing the flag, it accidentally tore, and the old pirate fled to shore to try to sew it up. When Tootles and Wendy arrive, he sees his chance to give his guilt away, but just as the two are leaving with their trophy, they are caught by the pirates. Hook sees this as an opportunity to use Wendy as bait to catch his nemesis, but Tootles manages to ruin the Captain's plan just enough to save Peter and Wendy.
19	"Hook's Decision! The Pirate Ship Mysteriously Disappears?" "Fukku no Ketsui! Kieta kaizoku-sen no Nazo?" (フックの決意！消えた海賊船の謎？)	May 28, 1989
Under the rains of the black clouds that circle above, Hook takes his ship up into his castle. He looks among his most treasured possessions, and finds his cloak missing. Smee then admits that he was taking it out to dry, and that he could not find it since. Hook bursts into a fury that shakes the whole castle. Meanwhile, the lost boys are happily playing with the cloak, while Wendy worries that all this fun could cause much trouble. Peter Pan decides to bring back the cloak just to please Wendy, but is surprised to find the pirate ship missing from the bay. Peter decides to wait for the ship to return. Back at the tree house, Wendy is proved right when the pirates come heavily armed with Hook's most powerful explosives, cannons, and swords. Although the Lost Boys fight with all their might, the pirates still overcome their tree house. Alf grabs hold of Wendy as a hostage and it seems there is no hope left, but no firearm or blade can withstand the Lost Boys' secret weapon: Peter Pan.
20	"Desperate Situation! Wendy Disappeared in Mist Valley" "Zettai Zetsumei! Uendi ga Kiri no Tani ni Kieta" (絶対絶命！ウェンディが霧の谷に消えた)	June 4, 1989
Captain Hook is not giving up, and this time wants Wendy to be his, and wants the Lost Boys out of Neverland. His weapon to trick Wendy is Tinkerbell, and his weapon to destroy the Lost Boys is a huge enormous cannon, which won't do any good to their tree house.
21	"Save Wendy! Tink Risks her Life" "Uendi wo Sukue! Inochi wo Kaketa Tinku" (ウェンディを救え！命をかけたティンク)	June 18, 1989
The tree house is destroyed, Wendy is captured and Peter Pan is trapped. The Lost Boys need all their power to save them and get help from Tiger Lily. Tinkerbell feels guilty about what she did and is prepared to suffer her life for Peter's sake.
22	"The Secret Weapon Activates! Captain Hook's Final Trump Card" "Himitsu Heiki Shidō! Fukku Senchō Saigo no Kirifuda" (秘密兵器始動！フック船長最後の切り札)	June 25, 1989
Hook reveals his huge robot 'One-Eye', fully equipped with cannons, iron fists, and a big, bright searchlight. Peter is scared out of his wits at first, but when Smee mysteriously turns on all the lights, including the lantern in which Wendy has been trapped, he has lost all his fear. Hook tries to crush him and shoot him, but misses and almost hits Wendy. This is where the Captain takes her up in the metal clutches of his robot and rides after Peter, crushing everything beneath him- including a water pipe. The pirates and Lost Boys see the giant spiked wheel of Hook's secret weapon break through the ceiling and fall. Somehow, Hook manages to steer the robot out and into the mountain where he breaks the stone wall with the fist in which Wendy is held. She is suspended far above the sea, and with one pull of a string, the Captain can have her fall. Tootles tries to get his hot-air balloon close enough to save Wendy, but fails. The Lost Boys start tearing the robot apart, but this makes it lose hold of Wendy. She falls and it looks like Peter has to fly faster than sound to save her.
23	"The Mystery Thickens! Search for Tink's Home" "Nazo ga Fukamaru! Tinku no Furusato wo Sagase" (謎が深まる！ティンクの故郷を探せ)	July 9, 1989
The whole first half is a huge, somewhat grotesque, fight scene. At last, when Hook rams his mechanical sword into a boulder and sinks with it, Peter reverses the dark clouds that hover around the castle to make them disappear. The light pierces through every crack and doorway, and the mountain crashes down into the sea, crushing Hook's ship. When Peter's band returns to their demolished house, Tiger Lily tells them that Tink has disappeared. Even the Chief does not know where she has gone, but he advises them to go to the Memory Bird who lives on top of the Rain Giant. Peter and Wendy have difficulty finding anything out from this Memory Bird, and, moreover, they must get off the Rain Giant before it disappears.
24	"The Dreadful Black Cloak Group and the Mysterious Girl!" "Osoroshī Kuro Manto no Shūdan to Nazo no Bishōjo!" (恐ろしい黒マントの集団と謎の美少女！)	July 23, 1989
The evil shadows of the revived black mirror turns the part of Neverland into a wasteland. All life seems to be gone. In the meantime, the Lost Boys build a multifunctional moving cottage boat to replace their destroyed tree house. Their first mission is to look for Tinkerbell, and their second mission is to stop the treat of darkness. They meet Luna, the Princess of Darkness, the granddaughter of Sinistra, the powerful witch who is the power behind the dark forces. Sinistra's three henchmen pursue Luna, who stole an amulet from her grandmother. Luna spends some time with the now traveling company, who do not fully trust her yet. The way to the valley of the Elves seems to be harder than it looks with these new enemies around.
25	"Welcome Back Tink! The Land of Fairies is a Mysterious Land" "Okaeri Tinku! Yōsei no Kuni wa Fushigi na Kuni" (お帰りティンク！妖精の国はふしぎな国)	July 30, 1989
The traveling boat of Peter and his band have reached the valley of the Elves now, but their boat has a hard time riding over a variety of different landscapes. Peter remembers Luna's transportation which has a flying stone. In the middle of the night, Slightly and Curly sneak out to look for this kind of stone, but in the meantime, Sinistra's henchmen continue to pursue Wendy and the Lost boys, although only when Peter Pan is away for a second.
26	"The Return of Captain Hook! Plans to Build a Flying Pirate Ship" "Fukkatsu Fukku Senchō! Soratobu Kaizoku-sen Kenzō Keikaku" (復活フック船長！空飛ぶ海賊船建造計画)	August 6, 1989
Luna sneaks into the boat to retrieve the amulet she hid there earlier, but she is caught by the Lost Boys, who bind her up a tree. Wendy releases her and talks with Luna about her background and her grandmother. In the meantime, the pirates find their way to this area, too, and they heard rumors about a powerful amulet, which they want to steal also. Sinistra's henchmen still want the same. In the meantime, Captain Hook has returned, and resides temporarily in the Ship Graveyard and has ambitious plans to build a new ship. These two different enemies are giving Luna and Wendy a hard time.
27	"Admirable Jon! A Knight Riding A Wooden Horse" "Jon no Akogare! Mokuba ni Notta-ki" (ジョンの憧れ！木馬に乗った騎)	August 13, 1989
Peter and his band have an encounter with a lonesome, brave knight named Don Malaprop. He tells them he defeated Captain Hook. Captain Hook, who is pretty much alive, is not amused by these rumours, and seeks revenge. In the meantime, John wants to be a knight, too, and goes out with Don Malaprop while the pirates are looking for them.
28	"Wendy Becomes a Demon" "Akuma ni Natta Uendi" (悪魔になったウェンディ)	August 20, 1989
Wendy and Luna are kidding the others by switching their clothes. Sinistra orders her henchmen to put the Devil's bracelet around Luna's arm, who will probably return to her grandmother, but the henchmen mistake Wendy for Luna, and give the bracelet to the wrong person. Wendy gets an evil and aggressive personality, and doesn't remember who she is. Luna feels guilty, but can't remember if there's a cure.
29	"Fairy Pushke! Gather Courage and Fly" "Yōsei Pushike! Yūki wo Dashite Tobitate" (妖精プシケ！勇気を出して飛びたて)	August 27, 1989
Peter meets Penelope, an infant flower fairy who is unable to fly after her mother died. Penelope quickly sees Peter Pan as her "mother", which makes him feel very uncomfortable. The other fairies have to leave her behind because, otherwise, they will all die. This leaves Peter, Wendy and the others to the difficult task to teach her how to fly.
30	"The Levitation Begins! Hook's Flying Pirate Ship" "Fujō Kaishi! Fukku no Soratobu Kaizoku-sen" (浮上開始！フックの空飛ぶ海賊船)	September 3, 1989
The boat seems to have driven off in the middle of the night. Peter and his band are stuck now on an island. They can't escape, because a huge fire-spitting monster fish burns everything that crosses the sea between the island and the shore. When it seems they're able to escape, a powerful, flying new pirate ship appears, with Captain Hook on the deck ordering his pirates to load the cannon.
31	"This Isn't a Dream! Peter Pan Can no Longer Fly" "Yume ga Nai! Tobenaku Natta Pītā Pan" (夢がない！飛べなくなったピーターパン)	September 10, 1989
Peter, Wendy and the others decide to set up their camp just before a scary dead forest. In the meantime, John, who once again wants to prove how brave he is, wants to explore the forest on his own. Michael follows him. They find some interesting fruit. John swallows some. When they get back, Peter eats the fruit too. John becomes agitated and forgetful, and doesn't want to live with the other anymore. Peter drops to the ground all of a sudden, and realizes he cannot fly anymore. Luna comes by and tells them the fruit was made rotten by Sinistra's Black Mirror. John and Peter separately get lost in the forest with evil wildlife.
32	"Searching with the Pirates for the White, Mysterious Mirror" "Kaizoku to Issho ni Sagase, Shiroi Kagami no Nazo" (海賊と一緒に探せ、 白い鏡の謎)	September 17, 1989
The band is fed up with the effects of Sinistra's Black Mirror, which seems to destroy all of Neverland, even though the process is stopped by the missing amulet. Luna remembers the Black Mirror's power might be broken by a White Mirror. Cecco and Bill try to eavesdrop on them, but Wendy sees them. They pretend not to have seen the pirates. Peter loudly shouts that they are going to look for the White Mirror Treasure, making the pirates want to look for it, but Captain Hook suspects something, and is planning to reverse the roles.
33	"Luna's Tears! Am I a Witch of Darkness?" "Runa no Namida! Watashi wa Dākunesu no Majo?" (ルナの涙！私はダークネスの魔女？)	October 1, 1989
The band decides to capture one of Sinistra's henchmen (to ask them about the white mirror). They suspect the plan and capture Wendy. They trade her with Luna. Peter pursues them, but is distracted by Captain Hook, who suddenly appears. Luna is brought to her grandmother, Sinistra, who tells her that running away is useless and it's time she faces her destiny: to become the new Queen of Darkness. Sinistra finds the location of the amulet by using her Black Mirror, seeing Rascal playing with it. She orders her henchmen to capture Rascal. The henchmen think they have succeeded, and run away with Peter Pan following them, but Captain Hook appears and wants the amulet back with Rascal (which is, in fact, a dummy). The terrified Henchmen give it to him, and fly the scene. Peter follows them again and then they meet Luna from the opposite direction, who is seeking to destroy Peter Pan.
34	"Can a Ghost Whistle be Heard? Search for the Ghost Train!" "Kiteki ga Kikoeru? Yūrei Kikansha wo Sagase!" (汽笛が聞こえる？幽霊機関車を探せ！)	October 22, 1989
Sinistra's henchmen go to Captain Hook for his help in capturing both Luna and the Amulet. He approves, but locks them up, also. Luna is depressed, so, to cheer her up, John wants to show her a train. They all hear the sound of a train, but can't find it. In the meantime, Peter taunts the pirates by saying he is looking for a train. Captain Hook now wants that train before Peter Pan finds it. John and Luna locates the 'train' and are quite surprised, but the pirates appear and capture Luna.
35	"A Formidable Enemy! Hook Teams up with Darkness" "Kyōteki! Te wo Kunda Fukku to Dākunesu" (強敵！手を組んだフックとダークネス)	October 29, 1989
Peter and Wendy try to find Luna and end up in an area of Elves who are befriended with Tink. Hook seeks revenge to these elves who taunted him and meets Sinistra. He delivers Luna to her, and the two form an alliance against Peter, Wendy and the Lost Boys. Sinistra gives him a magic torch to do so. In return, his pirates capture Rascal for her. Still, the amulet is the thing they need, and Rascal doesn't have it anymore.
36	"The Adventure Stops? Everyone's Beating Chest Aches!" "Bōken Chūshi? Minna no Munega Doki Doki Itai!" (冒険中止？みんなの胸がドキドキ痛い！)	November 5, 1989
Peter and Wendy go out look for a clue of the road to the Castle of Darkness, leaving the Lost Boys behind in the Elven area. They are quickly attacked by the pirates, who steal the amulet and capture Tinker Bell. Tootles, Slightly and Curly weren't around when it happened and especially Curly blames John. All of them start to fight, when Peter stops the fight. John realizes he can't stand the way they're living now and he gives up. The rest of boys follow. In the meantime, Wendy gets lost and encounters a strange Stone Token.
37	"The Largest-Ever Maze! The Road to the Castle of Darkness" "Shijō Saidai no Meiro! Dākunesu-jō e no Michi" (史上最大の迷路！ダークネス城への道)	November 19, 1989
After an exhausting journey to different heights, they finally get to the passage to the area of the Castle of Darkness, but finding the passage is just one thing, while opening it is something different. Hook is making plans to conquer Sinistra's Castle while setting sail to her domain.
38	"The Black Mirror Activates! Neverland is in a Big Pinch" "Kuroi kagami Shidō! Nebārando ga Dai Pinchi" (黒い鏡始動！ネバーランドが大ピンチ)	December 3, 1989
The Pirates plan an attack on the Castle of Darkness. Peter tries to free Luna. They both discover that Sinistra's powers are noting to play with. Sinistra is performing her final plan with Luna.
39	"Hook's Ambition! Take Over the Castle of Darkness" "Fukku no Yabō! Dākunesu-jō wo Nottore" (フックの野望！ダークネス城を乗っ取れ)	December 10, 1989
A seemingly brainwashed Luna is the Queen of Darkness now, and she is misled by Captain Hook that Peter Pan is her worst enemy. Luna wants to destroy Neverland in a greater proportion than Sinistra, and she seems more powerful, too.
40	"The Final Battle! Peter Pan Versus Captain Hook" "Saigo no Kessen! Pītā Pan tai Fukku Senchō" (最後の決戦！ピーターパン対フック船長)	December 17, 1989
The Lost Boys enter the Castle of Darkness too, which the pirates are trying to prevent. In the meantime, a battle arises between Luna, Captain Hook and Peter Pan. Luna summons a huge Black Knight to fight Peter Pan. Captain Hook, however, decides to take the matters in his own hand.
41	"Goodbye Peter Pan! The Land of Dreams and Adventures" "Sayonara Pītā Pan! Yume to Bōken no Kuni" (さよならピーターパン！夢と冒険の国)	December 24, 1989
Wendy and Luna have fallen through the Black Mirror and disappeared inside. In the meantime, Captain Hook has Luna's scepter and starts using magic tricks. After successfully creating a dragon (there were some mess-ups), he and Peter are ready for battle. Inside the mirror, things are getting tense as well, as Wendy must choose between killing a little girl to free herself from the mirror or being trapped in the mirror forever. To make things worse, that little girl is Luna. In a battle against her inner darkness, Luna frees herself of the evil that was within herself and shatters the Black Mirror, thus turning it into the White Mirror. With the Black Mirror turned into the White Mirror, light returns to Neverland, the Black Castle is turned into the White Castle, Neverland is restored and Hook's dark magic is undone. With peace restored to Neverland, Wendy, John and Michael return home to London. Time passes, however, and Peter doesn't show up. Some time later (it is soon revealed that years that have passed), Peter meets Jane, Wendy's daughter. Peter is disappointed at first, but he decides to bring Jane along with him. Peter is still looking for kids to take to Neverland, so kids should leave their windows open. If they can't, they should at least open a window in their hearts (so that Peter can send them wonderful dreams).

== Development ==
The preview summary's character designs and pictures of Peter Pan were released in magazines to promote the series. The character designs were slightly different from when the series aired. The story summary also had a plot of Peter Pan and his friends stealing a treasure map from the pirates and going on a journey to find it.

== Differences ==
Differences from the book or other Peter Pan versions:

- The setting of the time period of the series was changed from the Edwardian era to the late Victorian era.
- The character of Mary Darling is renamed here as is the middle names of John Darling.
- Rascal the Raccoon, a creation of Nippon Animation, appears occasionally throughout the series.
- In most of the other versions of the story, Neverland is located on an island in one of the vast oceans, but in The Adventures of Peter Pan (like the Burbank Films Australia's version) Neverland is located on a floating island hidden somewhere in the sky.
- In all other versions, Hook lost his hand when Peter Pan cut it off, but in The Adventures of Peter Pan it was bitten off by the crocodile while Hook lost his first fight with Peter Pan. Also in The Adventures of Peter Pan Hook occasionally substitutes it for a crab pincer claw.
- In all the other versions, Peter has a dagger, always worn close to himself to be ready for a duel all the time. In The Adventures of Peter Pan Peter uses a big shark tooth for his fights.
- In the book and most of the other versions, the Darling children leave their home and go to Neverland in their pyjamas (Disney's version, the 2003 live-action film, Peter Pan Live! and Burbank Films Australia's version). Here, they first are wearing pyjamas when Peter visits them at night, but before leaving, they change into their normal day clothes, which they wear while in Neverland (as in some other versions like Fox's Peter Pan & the Pirates or The New Adventures of Peter Pan).
- In the book and other versions, there is only one clock in Neverland, the one inside the crocodile's stomach, but in episode 8 of the series, "The Clock", it is shown that Hook also possesses another one on his ship.
- In the book (and the 2003 film and Peter Pan Live!), at the end of the story, Hook gets eaten by the crocodile, but here, he remains alive.
- In the book and other versions (Disney film, 2003 live-action film, Peter Pan Live!, Burbank Films Australia's film and Fox's Peter Pan & the Pirates), Peter and the others have their home in an underground house and as the name says, they live under the earth. Here, they first have a treehouse and live over the ground and later change it into a moving house on wheels.
- In the book (and Fox's Peter Pan and the Pirates), the Lost Boys and John Darling share a big bed and Michael, being the youngest of them has his own bed, which is a big basket. In "The Adventures of Peter Pan" (or Peter Pan Live!), everybody has sleeps in their own bed, though Michael is occasionally seen sharing a bed with John.
- In Barrie's novel (and the 2003 film and Burbank Films Australia's version), Peter and the boys build an extra house for Wendy, where only she lives and then regularly spends her time at the underground house. In this version (like in Peter Pan Live!), Wendy doesn't have her own house and lives in the same house as Peter and the others.
- In the book and most of the other versions (Disney's version, the 2003 live-action film, Burbank Films Australia's version and Fox's Peter Pan & the Pirates), the gang of the Lost Boys includes six boys, but here there are only three.
- At the end of the novel and some other versions (such as the 2003 live-action film and Peter Pan Live!), the Lost Boys leave Neverland, get adopted by the Darling family and grow up. In this series, they stay in Neverland and after Peter returns to Wendy's house, finds out she's grown up and has a daughter, while the lost boys are still children.
- At the end of the last chapter from Barrie's novel, Peter, after several years visits the Darling house again and meets the grown-up Wendy (and this is shown in Peter Pan Live!). In this version, when Peter returns to London, the adult Wendy is not at home, but only her daughter, Jane, who explains to Peter that Wendy has grown up.
- At the end of Barrie's story, when Peter visits Wendy in London, Tinker Bell is already dead, but in The Adventures of Peter Pan (and Disney's sequel to their version, Return to Never Land,) when Wendy is an adult, Tinker Bell is still alive and comes together with Peter to the Darling house.
- Although the original Japanese script makes no reference to the crocodile's gender, the English dub of this series refers to the crocodile as "he". In The Pirate Fairy, the crocodile in the Disney version is referred to as "he", and the crocodile in Burbank Films Australia's version is also described as male, while in Barrie's original, the crocodile is described as female. This is followed by the animated television series Fox's Peter Pan & the Pirates and Geraldine McCaughrean's official sequel novel, Peter Pan in Scarlet.

== See also ==
- Peter Pan: Produced by Disney Studios. Peter Pan's everyday wear is green.
- Peter Pan (musical): Jerome Robbins' musical. Also in this work, Peter Pan's everyday wear is green.
- Moero! Top Striker: An anime of overseas football, produced by many of the staff of this work and broadcast in 1991.
- High School! Kimengumi: A school comedy in which Yukiko Iwai, who sings the theme song of this work, sang the theme song when she was enrolled in the Onyanko Club. Broadcast in 1985.
