= Timeline of children's television on ITV =

This article timelines children's programming on the British network ITV and ITV Digital Channels. Following several decades of unorganised broadcasts of programmes for children on ITV from the earliest years of the network, the timeline fully commences in 1980, with the launch of its first dedicated branding for children's programming, Watch It!, which was replaced by Children's ITV in 1983; this name continued to be used as CITV until 10 April 2026, when its final block on ITV2 concluded before the debut of the Kids Special Edition of The 1% Club.

== 1950s and 1960s ==
- 1955
  - 22 September – ITV is launched when the first contractor, Associated-Rediffusion, goes on air, broadcasting to London on weekdays.
  - 23 September – Associated-Rediffusion starts airing its first regular children's programme, Small Time, at 12:15pm, catering to an audience of preschoolers; at 5pm, Tea-V Time airs as its regular children's strand, with an introductory programme explaining the structure of each edition.
  - 24 September – ABC, which was forcefully renamed ATV to avoid confusion with the then-upcoming ABC Weekend Television two weeks later, broadcast its own afternoon strand on Saturday afternoons, ABC Club. This also included a series of television adaptations of works of Danish author Hans Christian Andersen, the first of which being The Emperor's New Clothes.
  - 25 September – Adventures of Noddy, the first television adaptation of Enid Blyton's character Noddy, airs on ATV London.
- 1956
  - 17 February – Associated Television starts its weekday service in the Midlands; in its early months, Rediffusion's service Tea-V Time was networked to the region.
  - June – Tea-V Time is replaced by a generic children's strand.
- 1959
  - 11 January – Debut of Gerry Anderson's first puppet show on ITV by AP Films Torchy the Battery Boy.
- 1961
  - 28 January – Debut of Gerry Anderson's puppet show Supercar following the success of Torchy the Battery Boy. The first ITV programme by AP Films featuring a roman numeral copyright from the previous year (MCMLX) on the programme's intro credits.
  - Torchy the Battery Boy ends after 52 episodes.
- 1962
  - 29 April – Supercar ends after 39 episodes.
  - 28 October – Debut of Gerry Anderson's puppet show Fireball XL5, the last ITV children's programme produced in black and white by AP Films.
- 1963
  - 27 October – Fireball XL5 ends after 39 episodes.
- 1964
  - 4 October – Debut of Gerry Anderson's puppet show Stingray ("Standby for Action!"), ITV's first children's programme produced in colour by AP Films and the second programme featuring a Roman numeral copyrighted the previous year or previous two years on the programme's intro credits.
- 1965
  - 27 June – The final episode of Stingray was broadcast; 39 episodes were shown and broadcast in total.
  - 30 September – Debut of Gerry Anderson's puppet show Thunderbirds ("5, 4, 3, 2, 1! Thunderbirds Are Go!") ITV's second children's programme produced in colour by AP Films and featuring a Roman numeral copyright from the previous year (MCMLXIV) on the programme's intro credits.
- 1966
  - 25 December – Thunderbirds ends after 32 episodes.
- 1967
  - 29 September – Debut of Gerry Anderson's puppet show Captain Scarlet and the Mysterons following the success of Thunderbirds, Stingray and other shows. ITV's third children's programme produced in colour by AP Films.
- 1968
  - 4 April – Southern Television's Freewheelers makes its debut.
  - 14 May – Captain Scarlet and the Mysterons ends after 32 episodes.
  - 30 July
    - Magpie makes its debut on ITV.
    - Sooty moves to ITV, transferring from the BBC after its cancellation the previous year.
- 1969
  - 21 September – Debut of Gerry Anderson's final puppet show The Secret Service, ITV's fifth children's programme produced in colour by AP Films. It ends after 13 episodes broadcast by 14 December.

== 1970s ==
- 1970
  - 13 November – The Colour Strike begins when ITV staff refuse to work with colour television equipment following a dispute over pay with its management.
- 1971
  - 3 February – After nearly three months, the ITV Colour Strike ends and programmes resume being produced in colour.
- 1972
  - 16 October – The first edition of Rainbow airs. It would run for the following 20 years.
- 1973
  - 1 January – Pipkins makes its debut.
  - 5 May – Southern Television's Freewheelers ends.
- 1974
  - 5 January – The first edition of Saturday morning children's magazine show Tiswas is broadcast. It ran throughout the morning on ITV.
- 1975
  - 2 September – Children's game show Runaround begins on ITV.
- 1976
  - 5 September – ITV airs the first episode of Jim Henson's family puppet sketch comedy The Muppet Show, hosted by Kermit the Frog, and produced at ATV Elstree Studios.
  - 26 September – Stop-motion animated children's programme Chorlton and the Wheelies makes its debut on ITV.
- 1979
  - 10 August – ITV suspends broadcasting for eleven weeks due to a technicians' strike.
  - 24 October – ITV resumes broadcasting.

== 1980s ==
- 1980
  - 6 June – The final edition of Magpie airs on ITV. The magazine format show ends after twelve years.
  - 29 December – ITV launches its first branded children's block when it launches Watch It!. The programmes broadcast on weekdays between 4:15pm to 5:15pm and despite the block being produced by ATV, the links were presented live by the duty continuity announcer in each ITV region.
- 1981
  - 7 September – The game show Runaround ends.
  - 29 December – Pipkins ends.
- 1982
  - 5 January – Let's Pretend, the replacement programme for Pipkins makes its debut.
  - 3 April – The final edition of Saturday morning programme Tiswas is shown on ITV a week after the series finale of Multi-Coloured Swap Shop was shown on BBC1. It had aired, albeit originally as a regional programme made by ATV, since 1974.
- 1983
  - 3 January – Children's ITV is launched, replacing Watch It!. Programmes begin fifteen minutes earlier, at 4pm, the extra time being filled by a repeat of one of the pre-school programmes shown at lunchtime the same day. The slot was presented on a national basis and programmes were linked by an in-vision presenter. The links were pre-recorded in advance in a small studio at a London facility called Molinare, using a single locked-off camera and the presenter, usually from the world of children's television, changes on a monthly basis.
  - 1 February – ITV's breakfast television service TV-am launches, with children's programmes being a major part of the service, especially at the weekend.
  - 1 April – Roland Rat first appears on TV-am. Created by David Claridge and launched by TV-am children's editor Anne Wood to entertain younger viewers during the Easter holidays. Roland had been generally regarded as TV-am's saviour, being described as "the only rat to join a sinking ship".
  - April – No. 73 launches nationally as ITV's Saturday morning children's show. It had launched the previous year as a regional programme by TVS.
- 1984
  - 9 October – The children's series based on the books by Wilbert Awdry and narrated by Ringo Starr, Thomas the Tank Engine & Friends, begins on ITV, becoming one of the most successful children's television programmes of all time since Postman Pat debuted on the BBC three years earlier. The show would move to Cartoon Network in the mid-1990s, before returning to terrestrial television in 2003, and moving to its new permanent future station Channel 5 three years later.
  - 13 October – TV-am launches a new Saturday morning children's series called the Wide Awake Club. The live programme replaces pre-recorded shows such as Data Run and SPLAT.
- 1985
  - 14 September – Wide Awake Club is extended and now runs for almost two hours, from 7:30am until 9:25am.
  - 3 October – Roland Rat, one of TV-am's most successful characters, transfers to the BBC. With only a week until the October half-term was due to start, TV-am launches Wacaday, a spin-off of the existing and successful Saturday morning programme, Wide Awake Club.
- 1986
  - 3 May – The first edition of the Saturday morning programme Get Fresh airs. It alternates with No. 73 as ITV's Saturday morning children's magazine series for the following two years.
- 1987
  - 1 June – Live presentation of Children's ITV is launched and is presented by former Central announcers Gary Terzza and Debbie Shore.
  - 7 September – The Halloween-themed and medieval-set game show Knightmare makes its debut.
- 1988
  - 27 March – 7T3 (which was formerly known as No. 73 until January 1988) ends.
  - 3 September – Motormouth launches as ITV's new Saturday morning children's programme.
- 1989
  - 24 February – Debut of the children's game show Fun House on Children's ITV, presented by Pat Sharp.
  - April – The Wide Awake Club is renamed WAC '90. It was broadcast from Granada's studios in Manchester rather than from TV-am's London studios.
  - 3 April – The independent production company Stonewall Productions are hired to produce Children's ITV presentation. They choose not to use a fixed set, but instead present links from various areas of Central's headquarters at Broad Street in Birmingham, utilising a rotating team of presenters.
  - 3 September – The Disney Club airs for the first time. Produced by Scottish Television and aired on Sundays at 9:25am and broadcast mainly between September and April.

== 1990s ==
- 1990
  - 15 June – The long-running children's arts and crafts series Art Attack makes its debut on Children's ITV, presented by Neil Buchanan.
  - July – Hey, Hey, it's Saturday! replaces Wac '90 as TV-am's flagship Saturday morning children's programme.
- 1991
  - 9 April – Central is rehired to produce the continuity links, choosing to revert links back to a small in-vision studio and using one regular presenter, Tommy Boyd.
  - 12 April – Debut of the Neil Buchanan-hosted game show Finders Keepers, which would run until 1996 and briefly revived in 2006.
  - September – TV-am's Hey, Hey, it's Saturday! ends. It is replaced the following week by TV Mayhem.
  - November – After losing its franchise, TV-am drops all of its original children's programming, replacing it with a new Saturday morning block for children called Cartoon World, which as the name suggests, only showed cartoons.
- 1992
  - 6 March – After twenty years and 1002 episodes, the final new edition of Rainbow airs. The long-running series ends due to its producer Thames Television having lost its ITV franchise. Repeats continue to be shown until the end of the year.
  - 4 April – The final edition of the Saturday morning show Motormouth airs. The programme ends following the announcement that TVS's ITV franchise would end in 1992.
  - 5 September – The first edition of ITV's new Saturday morning show What's Up Doc? airs. It alternates with Gimme 5 as its Saturday morning children's show.
  - 30 November – The Sooty Show ends after 24 years (with an earlier twelve year run on the BBC), due to the loss of Thames Television's ITV franchise.
  - December – Cartoon World on TV-am ends.
- 1993
  - 1 January – Good Morning Television (GMTV) replaces TV-am as the new breakfast television licence holder for ITV and like its predecessor, children's programmes dominate weekend programming. Among the programmes are Saturday Disney, which usually aired before the Saturday morning block ends at 9:25am. It continued to be produced by Scottish Television which was one of the owners of them at the time. Also, a programme for younger children, Rise and Shine airs from 6am until the start of Saturday Disney.
  - 15 February – In-vision presentation is dropped by the first Network Centre controller of children's and daytime programming Dawn Airey (a former Central management trainee) with Steve Ryde providing live out-of-vision continuity links featuring a variety of animated characters.
  - 6 September
    - CITV's afternoon slot is extended to start at 3:30pm, moving the pre-school children's slot from 12:10pm. Around the same time, the Children's ITV name is changed to CITV, which has been used in some form or another for the previous year.
    - Debut of Sooty & Co., which replaces The Sooty Show and is produced by Granada Television.
- 1994
  - 10 January – Rainbow is relaunched with a new format, produced by Tetra Films for HTV. However, the retooled show receives a negative response and would end a year later, it was subsequently replaced by Rainbow Days.
  - 11 November – Knightmare ends after eight series and 112 episodes.
- 1995
  - January – The Disney Club returns to airing at 9:25am with Disney Adventures starting at 8am with Sally Gray presenting.
  - 29 April – The final edition of the Saturday morning show What's Up Doc? airs. It is replaced the following week by a new programme, Scratchy & Co..
  - 2 September – Gladiators: Train 2 Win begins airing as a children's spin-off of Gladiators.
- 1996
  - 30 March – Saturday Disney airs on GMTV for the final time.
  - 13 April – Wake Up in the Wild Room airs on GMTV for the first time set in a Jungle-themed studio interior with a similar format to earlier shows from both TV-am and GMTV like the Wide Awake Club, Hey, Hey, it's Saturday!, Cartoon World, Saturday Disney, Disney Adventures and even The Disney Club.
- 1997
  - 25 June – The Independent Television Commission awards the sole digital terrestrial television broadcast licence to British Digital Broadcasting. Its plans include a dedicated channel for children.
- 1998
  - 7 March – Wake Up in the Wild Room airs on GMTV for the final time.
  - 14 March – Diggit launches as GMTV's flagship children's programming block. It is broadcast from 7:10am to 9:25am on Saturdays and 8am to 9:25am on Sundays to replace Wake Up in the Wild Room. Additional editions on Bank Holidays and Summer holidays were shown under the name Diggit Extra.
  - 25 April – Scratchy & Co. ends.
  - 26 April – The Disney Club ends after nearly nine years, it is replaced by Diggit, which launched a month earlier. Road Hog ends at the same time after under a year on air.
  - 26 May – A new in-vision service is introduced by the new controller of ITV children's output, Nigel Pickard. Stephen Mulhern and Danielle Nicholls are hired as its presenters.
  - 29 August – SMTV Live launches as ITV's Saturday morning children's programme, presented by Ant & Dec and Cat Deeley.
  - 15 November – The public launch of digital terrestrial television in the UK occurs with the launch of OnDigital and as part of the 19-channel line-up, Carlton creates three new channels for the platform, including a daytime channel for children, Carlton Kids.
  - 14 December – Sooty & Co. ends after six series and 90 episodes.
- 1999
  - 4 January – GMTV2 launches during the breakfast slot of ITV2 and children's programmes form a major part of the new service.
  - 29 December – Fun House ends after a ten-year run.

== 2000s ==
- 2000
  - 31 January – Carlton Kids closes.
- 2001
  - CITV's budget is cut by 17% owing to the advertising recession, leading to CITV controller Janie Grace publicly criticising Carlton and Granada Television, then the main controlling forces in the network, for underinvestment.
  - A new strand for preschool children is introduced from 3:20pm every afternoon under the name "CITV's Telly Tots". The in-house presentation is removed and replaced with a CGI animated town using a plane, a car and a postbox as its mascots.
- 2002
  - Further cuts occur during 2002, bringing the total cutback to 25% of the overall budget.
- 2003
  - January – Diggit is relaunched as Diggin' It.
  - 27 December – SMTV Live ends after five years due to declining viewership.
- 2004
  - 10 January – The first edition of ITV's new Saturday morning children's programme Ministry of Mayhem airs.
  - 25 July – Recordings of CITV at Gas Street Studios in Birmingham ends after six years. For the remainder of the Summer, links were recorded from various locations (such as the Ministry of Mayhem studio at The Maidstone Studios and tourist attractions) starting on the following day.
  - 31 August – All in-vision continuity is replaced by voiceovers, with the closure of presentation and transmission facilities in Birmingham, and their move to ITV Granada in Manchester.
- 2005
  - 5 February – Diggin' It and Up on the Roof are merged into a new programme called Toonattik. It aired on Saturdays and Sundays from 7:25am until GMTV's closedown at 9:25am.
  - Further cuts occur to children's programming on ITV.
- 2006
  - 7 January – Ministry of Mayhem is relaunched as Holly & Stephen's Saturday Showdown.
  - 11 March – The CITV Channel launches on Freeview, Home Choice and Telewest. It starts broadcasting on Sky on 8 May and on NTL on 6 June.
  - June – ITV closes its in-house children's production unit, as part of its then ongoing process of restructuring ITV Productions, and blames the closure on the competitive production environment. ITV denies any intention of removing its children's programming from its network schedule.
  - 1 July – The final edition of Holly & Stephen's Saturday Showdown is broadcast, marking the end of ITV's Saturday morning children's programming after 32 years.
  - 30 October – The long-running animated series Horrid Henry makes its debut on CITV.
  - 22 December – CITV is broadcast on ITV1 on a weekday afternoon for the final time, marking an end for the original 23-year-old block. Skyland is the last programme shown. Starting in January 2007, it will be replaced with repeats of gameshows and dramas.
- 2007
  - 19 May – Art Attack ends after 17 years and 19 series.
- 2009
  - 2 November – CITV is relaunched, with a new logo and new branding to match ITV1 as part of ITV plc's corporate look. Mini CITV is also launched to house CITV's pre-school programming.

== 2010s ==
- 2010
  - 24 December – The final edition of Action Stations! airs.
  - 26 December – The final edition of Toonattik airs, alongside The Fluffy Club.
- 2012
  - 21 December – CITV broadcasts live programming for the first time in six years with a special 45-minute edition of Text Santa.
- 2013
  - 7 January – The Mini CITV name and the Mini mascots are removed from on-screen use.
  - 14 January – CITV rebrands alongside its sister channels and features a new logo.
  - 26 March – CITV's presentation and promotions unit is fully moved to MediaCityUK, as part of ITV's relocation from Granada Studios' former Quay Street headquarters.
- 2014
  - 18 January – The first edition of weekend breakfast show Scrambled! airs.
- 2015
  - 7 January – CITV withdraws all of its pre-school programmes from both its weekday and weekend schedules, with the exception of Sooty.
- 2016
  - 21 February – CITV's broadcast hours are extended into the early evening, with programmes continuing to air until 9pm alongside rival channel CBBC.
  - November – CITV's dedicated in-house promotions and presentation unit closes down, and the controller of the children's programming position, last occupied by Jamila Metran, is terminated. All remaining responsibilities for the channel came from other ITV personnel.
- 2018
  - 3 September – LittleBe launches on ITVBe. It aired in the mornings and aimed at younger children aged 2 to 6. The block also aired from 9am to 12 noon on weekdays and weekends and Sooty is moved from CITV to LittleBe.
- 2019
  - June – CITV partners with the BFI's three-year Young Audiences Content Fund pilot scheme to deliver more UK-originated programming.
  - 20 September–2 November – CITV Breakfast on ITV is temporarily suspended due to the Rugby World Cup.

== 2020s ==
- 2021
  - 11 April – The final edition of Scrambled! airs.
- 2022
  - 9–19 September – CITV Breakfast on ITV is temporarily suspended due to the death and state funeral of Queen Elizabeth II.
- 2023
  - 10 March – ITV plc announces plans to close the CITV channel and transition its children's output to mostly online services.
  - 6 May – CITV Breakfast on ITV is temporarily suspended again due to the coronation of King Charles.
  - 24 July – ITV Kids launches on ITVX.
  - 27 August – CITV programming is broadcast on ITV (as part of ITV Breakfast) for the final time, ending the Children's ITV/CITV block within the national ITV network after 40 years and withdrawing the last regular scheduled provision of programmes made for children on the network.
  - 1 September – The CITV channel closes, with programmes moving to ITVX.
  - 2 September – CITV programming moves to ITV2 as a morning block, providing linear broadcasting of children's programming from ITVX. The block broadcast every day between 5am and 9am.
- 2024
  - 31 May – LittleBe closes on ITVBe, with programmes moving to ITVX.
- 2025
  - 9 June – The children's block on ITV2 is reduced to less than two hours, airing from 6am to 7:45am.
- 2026
  - 10 April – The CITV block on ITV2 shuts down after two and a half years and 43 years after the brand's creation, marking an end to dedicated terrestrial children's television on ITV.
  - 24 May – The Kids Special Edition of The 1% Club makes its debut on ITV1 over a month after the complete closure of the CITV block.

== See also ==
- Timeline of children's television on the BBC
- Timeline of children's television on other British TV channels
