= Peter Pan (1988 film) =

1988 animated film

- Title card
- Directed by: David Cherkasskiy; Richard Trueblood
- Written by: Paul Leadon, J. M. Barrie (original author)
- Produced by: Roz Phillips
- Starring: Jaye Rosenberg
- Edited by: Mark D'Arcy Irvine, Peter Jennings
- Music by: John Stuart
- Production company: Burbank Animation Studios
- Distributed by: NuTech Digital
- Release date: June 23, 1988
- Running time: 50 minutes
- Country: Australia
- Language: English

Peter Pan is a 1988 Australian direct-to-video animated film from Burbank Films Australia. The screenplay, adapted from J.M. Barrie's 1911 novel Peter and Wendy, was written by Paul Leadon. The film was produced by Roz Phillips and featured music composed by John Stuart. Its copyright is currently held by Pulse Distribution and Entertainment, and administered by digital rights management firm NuTech Digital.

== Plot ==
The story begins at the house on Number 14, in London. Every night before going to sleep, Mrs. Darling tells her three children, Wendy, John, and Michael, stories of wonderful adventures in fantasy worlds. Many of these stories tell of Peter Pan, a boy who never grows up and lives in a place called Neverland. One night, Mr. and Mrs. Darling go out to dinner, leaving the children alone under the care of Nana, a large dog who serves as the children's nurse.

Once everyone has gone to sleep, Peter Pan and his fairy companion Tinker Bell appear, flying in through the window. Tinker Bell flies into a glass jug, playing around in it and breaking it, waking up Nana, who lunges for the boy; but before she can catch him, he escapes through the window. However, Nana does manage to get his shadow, which she sits on. Michael then begins to wail, causing Mr. and Mrs. Darling to return home. They find the broken glass jug and blame it on Nana, chaining her outside in the yard. Mr. Darling puts the shadow into the drawer, believing it to be a black shirt. Mrs. Darling, knowing they own no black shirts, worries about her charges, however Mr. Darling poo-poos her concerns, reminding her they still have a house maid (unnamed though most likely Liza).

Later that night, Peter appears at the window again, this time with the goal of taking back his shadow. After finding it stuffed into a drawer, he begins attempting to stick it back on, however he finds he cannot. What he does do, however, is create a loud enough sound to wake up Wendy, who sews it back on for him. As a reward for sewing it so well, Peter gives Wendy one of the buttons off of his tunic. In response, Wendy gives Peter a kiss on the cheek, which is met by the jealous fairy Tinker Bell pinching her. Then, Peter starts chasing Tinker Bell all over the room, chastising her for being so rude to Wendy. In doing this, he accidentally wakes up Michael and John. Peter then, at Michael's request, teaches the children how to fly, at last asking Wendy to be his mother in Neverland. Wendy doesn't want to, however Peter takes them to Neverland anyway.

Once in Neverland, Peter Pan leads Michael and John to Captain Hook, while Tinker Bell and Wendy fly to the Lost Boys, a group of motherless boys that Peter is the leader of. Captain Hook is a buffoon and coward, constantly scared of the arrival of the crocodile, who ate his right hand and follows him across the Earth, licking his lips for the rest of him. Lucky for Hook, he can always tell when the crocodile is nearby because of the ticking clock which the crocodile swallowed. After hearing from his bo'sun, Smee, that the Lost Boys now have a mother, Hook crafts a plan to kill Wendy. Peter goes to warn Wendy.

Meanwhile, Wendy and Tinker Bell meet with Nibs and Tootles, two of the Lost Boys. Tinker Bell convinces the pair that Wendy is a bird that Peter ordered them to shoot down. Nibs expresses suspicion, but Tootles grabs his bow and shoots Wendy out of the sky anyway. Just after, Peter arrives, telling them the good news that he's brought the boys a mother. Tootles and Slightly reveal that they shot down Wendy, believing Tinker Bell's lie. Peter is about to thrash Tootles, but he doesn't have the chance to, as Wendy suddenly comes back to life. Peter discovers that the arrow pierced the button he gave her, rather than her heart. Wendy is then declared the Lost Boys mother, despite her protests, and marched into the Home Under the Ground.

The next morning, Peter and the boys build Wendy a house, as Wendy does their laundry and their darning. The pirates spy on them from the bushes, finally discovering Peter's hiding place. Captain Hook plans on placing a poisonous cake outside of the hideout with the plan of killing Wendy. The other pirates are saddened by this plan, as they wanted to kidnap Wendy and make her become their mother. To make up for this, Hook plans on kidnapping the Indian Princess Tiger Lily, and making her become the pirate mother, which the pirates all agree to. Hook places the poisonous cake outside of the Lost Boys' home and slinks away back to the pirate ship. The cake doesn't work, however, because Tinker Bell overhears Hook's plot and throws away the cake before anyone else can be harmed by it.

Later, the Lost Boys and Wendy are by a body of water, fishing and sitting around. Suddenly, a dinghy comes into the area, captained by Smee and Starkey. The only other passenger on the dinghy is Tiger Lily, who Smee and Starkey beg to become their mother. Tiger Lily stands firm and says no, so the pirates decide to tie her up to a small rock, where she will surely drown with the rising tide. To save Tiger Lily, Peter imitates Hook and, as Hook, tells the pirates to set Tiger Lily free. Smee and Starkey do so, right as the true Captain Hook enters, expressing displeasure at them for setting Tiger Lily free. After they explain that they were ordered to do it by "Hook," the real Hook realizes that Peter was imitating him and taking advantage of him. The pirates and the Lost Boys break into a combat, leaving the Lost Boys victorious.

After the dust settles, the Indians explain to the Lost Boys that the pirates are planning on attacking the Home Under the Ground later that night, so the Indian Chief, Great Big Little Panther, agrees to protects Peter's home for the night. During the night, the pirates catch the Indians by surprise, tying each of them up and throwing them into the Wendy House. Hook then walks to the entrance of the Home Under the Ground, imitating Great Big Little Panther and asking the boys to come up for a pow-wow. Through this method they kidnap every Lost Boy, except for Peter, who sleeps soundly, completely unaware of anything going on above. Hook takes the boys and Tinker Bell to the ship. Once at the ship, Tinker Bell cuts her bonds with Hook's sword, flying back to the Home Under the Ground and telling Peter that Wendy and the boys have been kidnapped. Peter springs into action, helping the Indians escape their bondage and asking the fairies and mermaids for help.

Right as the children are about to walk the plank, Peter, the Indians, the fairies, and the mermaids all attack the ship, defeating the pirates once and for all. After all is said and done, Wendy decides that everyone should go back home to their real mothers, even Smee. Once the Darling children are safely back home in the house on Number 14, Wendy asks Peter and Tinker Bell if they would like to stay with him. Peter declines, explaining that he wants always to be a little boy and to have fun, and that living in London would mean growing up. They say goodbye, as Peter flies off into the night.

== Cast ==
- Phillip Hinton as Captain Jasper Hook and Mr. Darling
- Keith Scott as Smee
- Daniel Floyd
- Jonathon Panic as John Darling
- Carol Adams as Michael Darling
- Olivia Martin as Wendy Darling
- Jaye Rosenberg as Peter Pan and Mrs. Darling
- Ben Brennan
- Michael Anthony
