= Fun Factory (TV series) =

- Starring: Andy Sheldon
- Country of origin: United Kingdom

Production
- Running time: 4 hours

Original release
- Network: Sky Channel; Sky One
- Release: January 1985 – 11 September 1994

Fun Factory is a children's programme on the satellite television channel Sky Channel (later to become Sky One) that ran from 1985 to 1994. It continued as a programming block without a host up until 1994.

== Original programme ==
It was originally hosted by Mr. P, who was later replaced by Andy Sheldon, Snoot the seal and Crocker the crocodile. The programme included cartoons such as:

- Ghostbusters
- Transformers
- He-Man and the Masters of the Universe
- Jem
- Inspector Gadget
- M.A.S.K.
- Jayce and the Wheeled Warriors
- Lady Lovely Locks
- Care Bears
- BlackStar
- The Family-Ness
- Denver, the Last Dinosaur
- Barrier Reef
- Ivanhoe
- Emily
- The Toothbrush Family
- SuperTed
- Police Academy
- C.O.P.S.
- Roger Ramjet
- Starcom: The U.S. Space Force
- The Challenge of the GoBots
- Choppy and the Princess
- The Get Along Gang

== Second incarnation ==
After Sky Channel's renaming to Sky One in 1989, the Fun Factory name was used for a weekend block programming strand showing nothing but animated series, notably without any live-action presenters in-between the programmes - just animated interstitials. This version of the Fun Factory lasted from 1991 to September 1994, when it was replaced with The DJ Kat Show weekend spin-off, KTV. A partial list of series shown on the Sky One-era Fun Factory include:

- Barbie
- Barbie and the Rockers (UK Title: Barbie and the Rock Stars)
- Beverly Hills Teens
- BraveStarr
- Charlie Brown
- Dick Tracy
- Fat Albert and the Cosby Kids
- Inspector Gadget
- Jayce and the Wheeled Warriors
- The Little Mermaid
- The Marvel Superheroes
- M.A.S.K.
- Mrs. Pepperpot
- My Little Pony
- My Little Pony Tales
- The New Adventures of Superman
- Peter Pan
- The Plastic Man Comedy/Adventure Show
- Pole Position
- Police Academy
- Silverhawks
- Super Jem (October 2, 1988 – July 6, 1990) (Super Jem – Series 2: Super Jem Duo (Jem – Series 5: Super Jem Duo))
- Star Trek: The Animated Series
- Teenage Mutant Hero Turtles
- Transformers
- Visionaries: Knights of the Magical Light
