= Megamaths =

British educational television series

- Opening titles of the second and third series
- Genre: Educational children's series
- Written by: Neil Ben (Series 1–2); Chris Lillicrap (Series 1); Michael Malaghan (Series 1–3); Kjartan Poskitt (Series 1); Simon Davies (Series 2–6)
- Directed by: Neil Ben (Series 1–2); Ken Robertson (Series 3)
- Starring: List: Jenny Hutchinson (Joker, Series 1) Gareth Jones (Joker, Series 2–3) Tony Armatrading (King of Clubs, Series 1–3) Simon Davies (King of Diamonds, Series 1–3/Colin Cool & Harry Fraction, Series 4–6) Andrew Grainger (King of Hearts & Jack of Clubs, Series 1–3) Paul Raffield (King of Spades & Jack of Hearts, Series 1–2) Paul Leonard (King of Spades, Series 3) Liz Crowther (Queen of Diamonds, Series 1) Carolyn Pickles (Queen of Diamonds, Series 2) Anne Keaveney (Queen of Diamonds, Series 3) Janine Duvitski (Queen of Hearts, Series 1) Annee Blott (Queen of Hearts, Series 2) Julia Deakin (Queen of Hearts, Series 3) Polly Highton (Queen of Spades, Series 1) Souad Faress (Queen of Spades, Series 2) Su Douglas (Queen of Spades, Series 3) Josette Bushell-Mingo (Jackie of Diamonds, Series 1) Isobel Middleton (Jackie of Spades, Series 1–2) Jan Goodman (Jackie of Spades, Series 3) Ginny Holder (Five of Hearts, Series 2) Albey Brooks (Urchin, Series 2) Craig Heaney (Maths Man, Series 4) Kim Vithana (Her Wholeness, Series 4) Liz Anson (Sue Harker, Series 4) Paul Vates (Maths Man, Series 5–6) Clive Perrott (His Wholeness, Series 5–6) Paven Virk (Princess Nebulous, Series 6)
- Voices of: List: Kim Chandler (Digit, Series 1–3) Paul Mark Elliot (Brimstone, Series 1–3) Sam Elsayeb (Series 1) Laura Harling (Series 1) Marie Phillips (Goyle, Series 1–3) Phil Woodfine (Gar, Series 1–3) Su Douglas (VERA, Series 5–6)
- Composers: Sandy Nuttgens (Series 1–3); Mike Scott (Series 1–3); Archie Brown (Series 4–6)
- Country of origin: United Kingdom
- Original language: English
- No. of series: 6
- No. of episodes: 40

Production
- Executive producers: Anne Brogan (Series 2); Clare Elstow (Series 3–6)
- Producers: David Scott-Cowan (Series 1–2); Andrea Christodoulou (Series 2); Elaine Mullings (Series 3); Allan Johnston (Series 4–6)
- Running time: 20 minutes (Series 1–5); 15 minutes (Series 6)

Original release
- Network: BBC Two
- Release: 16 September 1996 – 4 February 2002

Megamaths is a BBC educational television series for primary schools that was originally aired on BBC Two from 16 September 1996 to 4 February 2002. For its first three series, it was set in a castle on top of Table Mountain, populated by the four card suits (Kings, Queens and Jacks/Jackies, and a Joker who looked after children that visited the castle and took part in mathematical challenges). There were two gargoyles at the portcullis of the castle named Gar and Goyle who spoke mostly in rhyme, and an animated dragon called Brimstone who lived in the castle cellar (with his pet kitten, Digit). Each episode featured a song explaining the episode's mathematical content.

The three remaining series, however, were set in a "Superhero School" space station, featuring a trainee superhero named Maths Man who was initially guided by a female tutor, Her Wholeness, in the fifth series, and later by a male tutor, His Wholeness, in the fifth and sixth series. In the fourth series, there were also recurring sketches of a quiz show named Find that Fraction hosted by Colin Cool (played by Simon Davies who co-wrote the second to fourth series with director Neil Ben and had played the King of Diamonds in all four Table Mountain series), and a sports show named Sports Stand hosted by Sue Harker (a spoof of Sue Barker, who was played by Liz Anson) and Harry Fraction (a spoof of Harry Gration, who was also played by Simon Davies), along with a supervillain named The Diddler who Maths Man had to solve mathematical problems caused by when he ventured down to Earth (in the final episode, she was revealed to actually be Her Wholeness in disguise). In the sixth series, the Superhero School gained an on-board computer named VERA (whose initials stood for "Voice-Enhanced Resource Activator", and was voiced by Su Douglas who also played the Queen of Spades in the fourth series) and a character named 2D3D who appeared in his virtual reality glasses (Maths Man now also spoke directly to the audience when he ventured down to Earth calling them his "Maths Team", and His Wholeness set a puzzle for them at the end of each episode). In the seventh and final series, the episodes were shortened from twenty minutes to fifteen, and again featured Maths Man getting sent down to Earth to solve mathematical problems in everyday life.

== Episodes ==
Series
Season	Title	Episodes	Originally released	
Season	Title	Episodes	First released	Last released
1	Tables	10	September 16, 1996	November 25, 1996
2	Money / Division	10	January 13, 1998	March 24, 1998
3	Measure	5	January 12, 1999	February 9, 1999
4	Fractions	5	January 17, 2000	February 14, 2000
5	Shape and Space	5	January 19, 2001	February 16, 2001
6	Problem Solving	5	January 7, 2002	February 4, 2002

=== Series 1: Tables (1996) ===
The first series, which was co-written by Christopher Lillicrap (who had previously written the first, second and fourth series of the BBC's earlier primary maths show, Numbertime, as well as the El Nombre sketches of its third series), comprised ten episodes focusing on multiplication. Each episode opened and ended with the episode's table being chanted, and the Joker (played by Jenny Hutchinson) introduced it in rhyme while speaking directly to the audience (she would also welcome teams of schoolchildren who came to visit the castle and give them advice as they took part in mathematical challenges). The two gargoyles, Gar (male) and Goyle (female), also made observations on the mathematical happenings in the castle then summarised what its residents learned near the end of each episode (the week's table would also be displayed on the portcullis as it lowered), and the castle pets, Brimstone the dragon and Digit the kitten (who were drawn by Bevanfield Films in this series), had their own adventures below stairs in the cellar.

This series was originally aired on Mondays as part of the BBC's schools programmes strand, then entitled Daytime on Two, at 9:40am.

No. overall	No. in series	Title	Original release date
1	1	"Two Times"	16 September 1996
This episode introduces the concept of the times sign for multiplying, and the 2 times table. To celebrate the invention of the times sign by the Kings, the Queen of Spades makes a 2 times table banner in their new counting house which has a speaking tube, a book called "Old Mathematical's Book of Odds and Evens" and a multiplication square for the 2 cards. Suit Animation – 6 Spades – 3 × 2, 2 × 3, 6 × 1
2	2	"Five Times"	23 September 1996
The Jack of Clubs and the 5 cards must sow 20 sunflower seeds in equal rows, and the Queen of Spades in the counting house with the help of the Jackie of Diamonds works out the wages. The Jack of Clubs gets a fine for cheating as the Queen of Spades soon finds out that the 5 cards have sowed the 20 sunflower seeds in 5 rows of 4 instead of 4 rows of 5. Suit Animation – 10 Clubs – 2 × 5, 5 × 2, 1 × 10
3	3	"Ten Times"	30 September 1996
The King of Clubs orders at Ace Tailors a waistcoat with 10 silver buttons. But all the other Kings, on hearing the news, want to outdo each other, and the Ace of Clubs ends up with 100 silver buttons to sew altogether. The Queen of Diamonds in the counting house with the help of the Jack of Hearts works out from the Ace of Clubs how much the silver buttons on the Kings' new waistcoats are going to cost. After thinking that 100 pennies on buttons alone is altogether too expensive, the Queen of Diamonds tells the Ace of Clubs to cancel the silver buttons and replace them with zips. Suit Animation – 20 Diamonds – 2 × 10, 4 × 5, 5 × 4
4	4	"Three Times"	7 October 1996
The Queen of Hearts gets more than she bargains for when she tries to buy something to wear for her husband, the King of Hearts, but finds that the 3 cards' stall at the courtyard sale only sells things in sets of 3. The King of Hearts in the counting house with the help of the Jackie of Spades works out how much the number cards raised in the courtyard sale. The 7 cards raised 21 pennies for the castle cleaning department and the 8 cards raised 24 pennies for the castle garden. Suit Animation – 15 Hearts – 5 × 3, 3 × 5, 15 × 1
5	5	"Six Times"	14 October 1996
The Jack of Clubs and the 6 cards have to make a celery and salami soup for 6 people, and the King of Spades in the counting house with the Jackie of Spades invents a Times Machine but it keeps coming up with the wrong answers as they work out the ingredients for 6 ginormous fruitcakes that the kitchens are baking for tea. They work out that the kitchens need 48 bags of raisins, 54 bags of cherries and 60 bags of nuts. So in the end, the King of Spades decides to keep the table banner, Old Mathematical's and the multiplication square and sell the Times Machine. Suit Animation – 12 Spades – 2 × 6, 6 × 2, 3 × 4
6	6	"Nine Times"	28 October 1996
It is the Queen of Diamonds' birthday which the Party 9s are organising, and all her presents are on the theme of 9. She gets given 9 nicknacks, 18 ear-rings, 27 thimbles, 36 necklaces, 45 golden eggs, 54 bottles of perfume, 63 silk scarves, 72 sapphires, 81 emeralds and 90 diamonds (10 diamond brooches with 9 diamonds on each one). But it is possible to have too much of a good thing. After finding out that the cost of the Queen of Diamonds' birthday is going to be astronomical, the Queen of Spades in the counting house with the Jackie of Diamonds asks her to go and speak to the Party Aces immediately and get them to write out a list of charges. Suit Animation – 18 Clubs – 2 × 9, 9 × 2, 3 × 6
7	7	"Four Times"	4 November 1996
The King of Clubs orders a table with 4 legs, but once again the other Kings seek to outdo him, and the Ace of Diamonds at Ace Carpenters ends up having a very busy day. The Queen of Diamonds in the counting house with the Jackie of Spades uses the Times Machine for the Jack of Clubs to calculate for Ace Carpenters the total number of legs required for 9 chairs (1 chair for the King of Hearts, 4 chairs for the King of Diamonds and 4 chairs and 4 footstools for the King of Spades) but the machine once again comes up with the wrong product. Suit Animation – 16 Diamonds – 4 × 4, 2 × 8, 16 × 1
8	8	"Eight Times"	11 November 1996
The Jackie of Diamonds and the 8 cards are trying to make a multiple pie – all the ingredients must be in multiples of 8. But the 8 of Diamonds is ill and the Ace of Diamonds from Ace Catering is sent to take her place, with disastrous results. The Jackie of Diamonds asks the King of Hearts in the counting house if he with the help of the Jackie of Spades could make a chart showing all the multiples of 8. Suit Animation – 24 Hearts – 3 × 8, 6 × 4, 2 × 12
9	9	"Seven Times"	18 November 1996
The 7 cards must provide 35 apples for the Queen of Hearts' tarts – but there must be the same number of apples on each tree. The 7 cards work out that 5 and 7 are the factors of 35 but while munching on 4 apples from the last tree, the 7 of Clubs accidentally eats another apple from the 35. The 7 cards then notice another tree growing lemons so the 7 of Diamonds tell the 7 of Clubs that he has no choice but to get his paintbrush and paint a lemon to look like an apple. The absence of the 7 times table banner (which is at Ace Dry Cleaners) and the multiplication square (which is at Ace Painters) in the counting house causes problems for the Queen of Diamonds and the Jack of Hearts as they try to work out the answer to the Joker's riddle. Suit Animation – 21 Spades – 3 × 7, 7 × 3, 21 × 1
10	10	"Big Numbers (aka Miscelleny Times)"	25 November 1996
The castle residents are off on holiday, but it is going to take some big multiplication to work out how much of everything they need to take with them. So the Jack of Clubs speaks to the King of Hearts who is at the counting house with the Jackie of Spades through the speaking tube if he could use the Times Machine. The Ace Mechanic of Spades fixes the Times Machine for the King of Hearts and he uses it to multiply for the 3 cards 420 by 4 packed lunches. But then the Times Machine is soon destroyed for good after the King of Hearts gets carried away and tries to multiply 5,000,000 by 50,000,000,000. Suit Animation – 120 Diamonds – 3 × 4 × 10, 6 × 10 × 2

=== Series 2: Money / Division (1998) ===
The second series, which was produced in 1997 after the BBC's corporate change (as evidenced by the then-new BBC logo at the end of each episode), comprised ten episodes focusing on money for the first five episodes and division for the last five episodes to particular amounts. The first five episodes opened with the Ace Auction where the royals bid each other up to that week's money amount, while the last five episodes featured a quintet of acrobats who would repeatedly rearrange themselves to show how division was related to multiplication with Brimstone and Digit saying the sums. This series also saw the arrival of a new Joker played by former Children's ITV host Gareth Jones (but while the original Joker possessed the ability to appear and disappear by snapping her fingers, he did not possess any magical powers). Brimstone and Digit also underwent a redesign in this series by new animators Tony Garth Films Ltd, and their appearance was significantly different to how they had originally appeared for the first series (as they looked more comical).

This series and the third were originally screened on Tuesdays as part of the newly renamed Schools Programmes strand at 11:15am.

No. overall	No. in series	Title	Original release date
11	1	"Money to 20p"	13 January 1998
The King of Hearts spends all his different coins of 20p (which were meant to buy his wife a birthday present) at the Ace Launderette while cleaning the Queen of Hearts' silk handkerchief. Plus a new Joker arrives at the castle.
12	2	"Money to 50p"	20 January 1998
The King of Spades is the highest bidder at the Ace Auction and wins a magnificent rickshaw from China for 50p, but it turns out to be more trouble than it is worth when Ace Clamper gets involved.
13	3	"Money to £1"	27 January 1998
The Jack of Clubs accidentally does the King of Clubs out of £1 when he buys what turns out to be a set of 5 perfectly ordinary glass bottles. They hatch a plan to make back the money by filling the bottles with moat water and tricking the other royals into thinking it is a miraculous cure-all-ills medicine called "Ol' Peculiar Wonder Juice". But things do not end well at the counting house bank.
14	4	"Money to £5"	3 February 1998
The Queen of Diamonds sells her velvet diamond studded purse to the Queen of Spades for £5 as she never accepts change, and pays the price for it when she overspends on a shopping spree.
15	5	"Money to £10"	10 February 1998
When the King of Diamonds sells one of his magnificent diamonds to Ace Jewellers for £10, he decides to spend it on a complete makeover at Ace Beauticians. But it proves to be more trouble than it is worth.
16	6	"Divide by Two"	24 February 1998
The Kings play football, and must work on their division as well as their footballing skills when they play against 4 sporty aces. Then the King of Spades builds a Division Machine from America.
17	7	"Divide by Four"	3 March 1998
The Jack of Clubs and the 4 cards must make a new bench for the castle gardens. Working out their wages proves problematic when it transpires that the King of Spades' overenthusiasm has caused the machine to break down, and it comes out with the wrong answers.
18	8	"Divide by Ten"	10 March 1998
The Queen of Diamonds wants her number cards kitted out with splendid new shirts, which means a lot of work for Ace Tailors.
19	9	"Divide by Five"	17 March 1998
It is the annual Kings' Cooks Day, and the Kings of Clubs and Diamonds must serve a top-notch meal to 5 number cards – or they will have to try again next year.
20	10	"Divide by Three"	24 March 1998
The King of Spades discovers his ancestors' treasure chest and he, his wife and the Jackie of Spades attempt to divide its contents by 3.

=== Series 3: Measure (1999) ===
The third series, which was produced in 1998 (and the last to be set at the castle on Table Mountain), comprised five episodes focusing on units of measurement. Brimstone and Digit also underwent a second redesign for their final series by second new animators Blue Sunflower Animation, but their appearance was only slightly different to how they had appeared for the second series.

No. overall	No. in series	Title	Original release date
21	1	"Sports Day"	12 January 1999
It is Sports Day, and everyone is fed up of the King of Diamonds always winning. Will this year be different? This episode explains centimetres.
22	2	"The King's New Clothes"	19 January 1999
The King of Spades wants a groovy new tunic for speech day, as this year his theme is how to look cool. But he does not know the first thing about units of measurement. This episode explains millimetres.
23	3	"Decorating"	26 January 1999
Ace Painters and Decorators demonstrate different types of rulers as they help the King and Queen of Diamonds redecorate. This episode explains metres.
24	4	"Treasure Hunt"	2 February 1999
The Aces organise a surprise treasure hunt for the royals, which will test their measuring skills. This episode explains kilometres.
25	5	"Holidays"	9 February 1999
The Kings and Queens prepare for their holidays. The Kings must measure their suitcases, and the Queen of Spades must work out the distance they all have to walk on their hiking trip – the No Hassle Castle Tour. From Table Mountain to the Tower of London to St Michael's Mount to Caernarfon Castle to Edinburgh Castle to Table Mountain, they will travel 2,395 kilometres in total. This episode recaps all the units of measurement.

=== Series 4: Fractions (2000) ===
The fourth series, which was produced in 1999, comprised five episodes focusing on fractions and decimals (and was the first to be set at the Superhero School space station). The trainee superhero, Maths Man (played by Craig Heaney), was guided by his mathematical tutor Her Wholeness (played by Kim Vithana), with recurring sketches of quiz show Find that Fraction with Colin Cool and sports show Sports Stand with Sue Harker and Harry Fraction. Each week, Her Wholeness would also receive a call from Earth about mathematical problems caused by supervillain The Diddler, and send Maths Man down to Earth to solve them (in the final episode, she was revealed to actually be Her Wholeness in disguise).

This first Superhero School-themed series was originally transmitted on Mondays as part of the Schools Programmes strand at 11:50am.

No. overall	No. in series	Title	Original release date
26	1	"Halves and Quarters"	17 January 2000
27	2	"Quarters and Eighths"	24 January 2000
28	3	"Fifths and Tenths"	31 January 2000
29	4	"Thirds and Sixths"	7 February 2000
30	5	"Decimals/Fractions"	14 February 2000

=== Series 5: Shape and Space (2001) ===
The fifth series, which was produced in 2000, comprised five episodes focusing on shape, space and position. Maths Man (now played by Paul Vates), was now guided by a new mathematical tutor His Wholeness (played by Clive Perrott), and aided by Superhero School's new on-board computer VERA whose initials were an acronym for "Voice-Enhanced Resource Activator", along with a character named 2D3D who appeared in his virtual reality glasses. In this series, Maths Man would speak directly to the audience when he was sent down to Earth referring to them as his "Maths Team", and His Wholeness would also set a puzzle for them at the end of each episode.

This second Superhero School-based series was originally transmitted on Fridays as part of the Schools Programmes strand at 11:30am.

No. overall	No. in series	Title	Original release date
31	1	"Two-Dimensional Shapes"	19 January 2001
Maths Man learns about triangles, quadrilaterals and polygons, and is sent down to the Bristol Kite Festival to make a kite.
32	2	"Three-Dimensional Shapes"	26 January 2001
Maths Man learns about prisms, pyramids and cuboids, and is sent down to the workshop at Legoland Windsor to build a church.
33	3	"Symmetry"	2 February 2001
Maths Man learns about symmetry through shapes, buildings (specifically, the Taj Mahal), reflections and paintings, and is sent down to a castle to find three symmetrical items: an English flag, a knight's helmet and a stocks (he also duplicates a man sitting in them).
34	4	"Patterns"	9 February 2001
Maths Man learns about patterns and tessellations through shapes, stamps, book covers, parties, the Hokey Cokey, chessboards and paintings, and is sent down to an art gallery to make a pattern from tiles that have shooting stars, rockets, moons and planets on them.
35	5	"Moving Around"	16 February 2001
Maths Man learns about directions, angles and degrees through a clock, and is beamed down to a zoo so he can find his way to the tapir and rabbit enclosures. He is then beamed back up to Superhero School to learn about grid references through a map of the space station, and beamed down to an amusement park so he can find his way to a pirate galleon and a tall slide. Finally, he is beamed back up to Superhero School for a second time to learn about the eight points of a compass, and beamed back down to the amusement park so he can find his way to the "Dancing Sombreros", a carousel, and the "NPower Shortwave Run" (he also rides the last one once he has reached it).

=== Series 6: Problem Solving (2002) ===
The sixth and final series, which was produced in 2001 and shortened the episode length from twenty minutes to fifteen, comprised five episodes focusing on solving various mathematical problems. Maths Man, again played by Paul Vates, was again sent down to Earth to solve mathematical problems in everyday life. This series also featured the character Princess Nebulous, played by Paven Virk.

This third Superhero School-themed series was originally transmitted on Mondays as part of the Schools Programmes strand at 11:50am.

No. overall	No. in series	Title	Original release date
36	1	"One-Step Problems"	7 January 2002
37	2	"Two-Step Problems"	14 January 2002
38	3	"Measure: Length and Time"	21 January 2002
39	4	"Measure: Mass and Capacity"	28 January 2002
40	5	"Money"	4 February 2002

== Resources ==
=== VHS ===
All six series were issued as Video Plus Packs in the same year they aired by BBC Educational Publishing (now BBC Active), which slightly altered the episodes to add the BBC's Video Plus branding to them (and, in some cases, to remove the opening titles).

Release name	UK release date	Notes	Reference
Megamaths Tables	1996	Video Plus Pack	
Megamaths Money	1998	Video Plus Pack	
Megamaths Division	1998	Video Plus Pack	
Megamaths Measure	1999	Video Plus Pack	
Megamaths Fractions	2000	Video Plus Pack	
Megamaths Shape and Space	2001	Video Plus Pack	
Megamaths Problem Solving	2002	Video Plus Pack	

=== Books ===
Teachers' notes were published for the first four series at the times they premiered, and they were included with their respective Video Plus Packs along with activity books that featured photocopiable worksheets and the words to the series' songs. Activity packs featuring the activity books, along with audio cassettes featuring songs of the series and A2 posters for classroom walls, were also released.

Release name	UK release date	Author	Publisher	Notes	Reference
Megamaths Tables	1998	N/A	BBC Educational Publishing	Teachers' Notes	

=== CD-ROMs ===
In 1998, one year after the BBC's corporate change, Logotron Limited released a CD-ROM based on the first series. The BBC themselves also had a webpage for the series at this time, based around the castle and featuring games set in it, but it has since been taken down.

Release name	UK release date	Publisher	Platform	Notes	Reference
Megamaths Tables CD-ROM	28 September 1998	Logotron Limited	MAC	For ages 5–11	
Megamaths Tables CD-ROM	28 September 1998	Logotron Limited	PC	For ages 5–11	

=== DVDs ===
Despite the fact that all seven series were issued as Video Plus Packs, only the fifth one was ever reissued as a DVD Plus Pack in 2006.

Release name	UK release date	Notes	References
Megamaths Fractions	July 2006	DVD Plus Pack	
