= Numbertime =

- Genre: Educational sketch show
- Written by: Christopher Lillicrap; Andrew Bernhardt (series 3, 5–7 and 9); Toby Jones (series 5); Guy Hallifax (series 8–9); Charles Way
- Directed by: Andrea Christodoulou (series 1); Phil Chilvers (series 2–5 and 7); Robin Carr (series 6 and 8); Andrea Parr (series 9); Neil Ben
- Starring: Lolita Chakrabarti (series 1–4); Ashley Artus (series 5–7); Anthony Barclay (series 3–4); Gary Beadle (series 2); Tony Bluto (series 1); Carolyn Bonnyman (series 2); Brian Bowles (voice only, Series 9); Laura Brattan (series 3–4; voice only, Series 5–9); Joanna Brookes (series 1, 3 and 4); Otiz Cannelloni (series 4); Paul Cawley (series 3–7; voice only, Series 8–9); Ian Connaughton (series 9); Simon Corris (series 3–4); Sue Elliott-Nicholls (voice only, Series 8); Chris Emmett (series 3–4); Michael Fenton-Stevens (series 8–9); Regina Freedman (series 1); Victoria Gay (series 5–7); Roger Griffiths (series 5–7); Mike Hayley (series 2–7); Toby Jones (series 5); Jenny Jules (series 1); Moir Leslie (voice only, Series 9); Tania Levey (series 5–6); Andy McEwan (series 1); Brian Miller (series 3–7); Anastasia Mulrooney (series 2–4); Fidel Nanton (series 5); Richard Pearce (voice only, Series 9); Mo Sesay (series 1); Elisabeth Sladen (series 3–4 and 9); Peter Temple (voice only, Series 7); Issy Van Randwyck (series 3–7); Paul Vates (series 8); René Zagger (series 2); El Nombre; Sophie Aldred; Janet Ellis (series 6–9); Kate Robbins; Steve Steen; Numbers Plus; Nicola Blackman; Tony Marshall; Jefferson Clode; Nia Davies; Stephen Kemble (voice only); Paul J. Reeve
- Composers: Neil Ben (series 5–9); Mark Blackledge (series 2–9); Archie Brown (series 9); Charles Casey (series 9); Stephen Chadwick (series 8); Seán de Paor (series 2); Andrew Dodge; Richard Durrant (series 5–8); Sue Herrod (series 2); Simeon Jones (series 9); Derek Nash (series 4–9); Sandy Nuttgens (series 5–9); Henry Marsh (Numbers Plus)
- Country of origin: United Kingdom
- Original language: English
- No. of series: 9
- No. of episodes: 68

Production
- Executive producers: Judy Whitfield (series 1); Stacey Adams (series 2); Anne Brogan (series 5); Clare Elstow (series 6–8); Sue Nott (series 9)
- Producers: Clare Elstow (series 1); Kristin Mason (series 2–9); Julie Ardrey (series 8); Judy Brooks (Numbers Plus)
- Running time: 15 minutes

Original release
- Network: BBC Two
- Release: 20 September 1993 – 3 December 2001

Numbertime is a BBC educational numeracy television series for primary schools that was aired on BBC Two from 20 September 1993 to 3 December 2001. For its first four series, it was presented by Lolita Chakrabarti. El Nombre, an animated character used throughout the series, eventually became the concept for his own educational BBC children's television program; his name means "The Name" in Spanish, and not "The Number", which would be "El Número". The third line of his opening song and his farewell catchphrase were also changed several times during the series' run, to reflect their focus - however, the original ones ("Writing numbers in the desert sand" which was also used for the seventh series, and "Adios amigos, and keep counting" which was also used for the fourth, sixth, seventh, eighth and ninth series) remain the most famous.

For the second series, El Nombre's tagline and farewell catchphrase were changed to "Drawing shapes in the desert sand" and "Adios amigos, and keep shaping up" respectively, while for the third series, they were changed to "Righting wrongs in the desert sand" and "Adios amigos, over and out" respectively; however, for the fourth series, his tagline was changed to "Counting numbers in the desert sand" (which was also used for the ninth series), and for the third episode of the fourth series, his farewell catchphrase was changed to "Adios amigos, and fetch some water". For the fifth series, both his tagline and farewell catchphrase were changed to "Telling time in the desert sand" and "Adios amigos, 'till the next time" respectively, while for the sixth series, his tagline was changed to "Using numbers in the desert sand"; finally, for the eighth series, his tagline was changed to "Counting money in the desert sand".

== Series 1: Numbers 1 to 10 (Autumn 1993) ==
The first series, which is aimed at four- to five-year-olds, comprised ten episodes focusing on the numbers 1-10, in order; each episode opened with Lolita introducing herself to the viewer, and pulling the number for the episode off its string (which was hanging from the studio ceiling), then pushing it into its correct hole in a wall, and singing the main theme, One to Ten, as each of its holes lit up in turn, which was repeated throughout the programme. In between, there were comedy sketches (mostly based on nursery rhymes and fairy tales), and animations, the most famous involving El Nombre, the Mexican gerbil who parodied Zorro, showing little Juan how to draw numbers as his four-piece mariachi band played The Mexican Hat Dance (and said "Again!" once he had finished, as it gave them an excuse to play again), and a sequence encouraging the viewer to spot things of the number for each episode - it was the same video, with a different number of things each time (and a recurring song, Numbers All Around, which was sung by a group of children). Each episode ended with Lolita singing a song (or occasionally, introducing an animation), after which she would set viewers the challenge of looking for things in the number of the week's episode before saying that she would "see them next Numbertime".

This series was originally aired on Mondays as part of the Daytime on Two strand at 9:45 am, and repeated at 2:00 pm on the same day; in Scotland, the 2:00 pm repeats were replaced with broadcasts of BBC Scotland's own schools series Over the Moon with Mr. Boom.

- Episode 1: Number 1 (20 September 1993)

The Narrator proudly presents Nursery Rhyme Theatre No. 1 - Little Miss Muffet with several interruptions, and Little Jack Horner has one minute to Find 1 Plum on Sammy Sallow's game show of the same name; if he succeeds, he can choose one prize - one mountain bike, or one computer, or one picture of Sallow. This episode also ends with One Finger, One Thumb, Keep Moving, which is sung by the group of children who sang Numbers All Around earlier on in it.

- Episode 2: Number 2 (27 September 1993)

The Narrator introduces Nursery Rhyme Theatre No. 2 with Marvo the Magician (and his Two Amazing Dickie Birds), and Sammy Sport reports on Jack and Jill's attempt to break the world record for the fastest time to run up a hill, fill a pail with water, and take it back down the hill again (under 2 minutes); this episode also ends with Lolita singing The Animals Went in Two by Two.

- Episode 3: Number 3 (4 October 1993)

Sammy Sport is joined by Baa-Baa Black Sheep for the results of the "Win a Bag of Wool" competition, while Goldilocks invites viewers to Guess Whose House (for Sammy Sallow's game show of the same name); the Numbertime Top Ten also brings the viewers, at No. 3, the ever-popular "Three-Sided Triangles", who sing an original song named We're Triangles (Oh Yes We Are).

- Episode 4: Number 4 (11 October 1993)

Farmer Giles introduces the finals of One Girl and Her Sheep at which Little Bo Peep and her dog Shep are competing, and the Knave of Hearts talks to the Queen of Hearts about her famous royal tarts; Lolita also tells the viewers to "grab their partners and take the floor" as she introduces a quartet of dancing squares, who sing an original song named Do the Square Dance.

- Episode 5: Number 5 (18 October 1993)

Australian chef Wally Bee (and his assistant, Bruce) attempt to show the viewers how to cook five fat sausages on a barbecue for Barbecue Time, and Harry Headline pays a visit to the home of the Five Pigs Family for Five Minutes' Fame; Little Juan also has his 5th birthday in this episode's El Nombre sketch, and this episode ends with Lolita singing Fly, Little Dickey Birds, Round and Round.

- Episode 6: Number 6 (1 November 1993)

A gardener named Fred enlists the help of his family in pulling up his enormous turnip for Garden Time, and Mr. and Mrs. Jones have to Take 6 Eggs on Sammy Sallow's game show of the same name and put them on either side of a seesaw to make it balance, for which they have three attempts to do so; this episode also ends with Lolita singing This Old Man in voiceover.

- Episode 7: Number 7 (8 November 1993)

Sammy Sport travels to Scotland to see a remarkable fishing contest between the famous Seven Fat Fishermen, to see which one of them can catch the biggest fish on a bridge on the banks of the Clyde, and ordering seven lots of fish and chips turns out to be more trouble than it is worth for the Shopkeeper and his Customer (who has got seven children, and they all want fish and chips); this episode also ends with Lolita singing In My Little Garden, Now Promise You Won't Laugh (also known as One Potato, Two Potato).

- Episode 8: Number 8 (15 November 1993)

Sammy Sport travels down to Shoeburyness to interview the Old Woman who Lives in a Shoe (who has 8 children), and the Policeman enlists the viewers' help in finding Wee Willie Winkie for Crime Spot; it is also evening in Little Juan's town in this episode's El Nombre sketch, and this episode ends with Lolita imagining what the world would be like if everything was eight-shaped as she visits the Planet of the Eights to sing an original song about it (and this is the only occasion in this series that she is not seen in her usual purple outfit, but a silver spacesuit).

- Episode 9: Number 9 (22 November 1993)

Lucky the Cat looks back over her nine lives, as she guests on This Is My Life, and Harry Headline comes to the garden of Miss Mary, Mary, Quite Contrary, to look at the wonderful display of flowers for Garden Time; unfortunately, he ruins her chances of winning their "Best Flowers Competition", and she ends up coming ninth. This was also the only episode for this series to not end with a song - instead, Lolita shows the viewers a homemade necklace which has nine beads (three red, three blue, and three yellow), in reference to the episode's third animated sketch.

- Episode 10: Number 10 (29 November 1993)

Farmer Giles (and his dog, Scruff) show viewers a wonderful, new, and very quick way to mow a meadow for Farming News, and Sammy Sport travels to Ten Pin Alley to watch Ten Pin Pete attempt to become the new Ten Pin Champ; Lolita also shows the viewers ten Russian dolls, and this episode ends with Ten in the Bed (which is, again, sung by the group of children who sang Numbers All Around earlier on in it). Also, because this episode was the last in the series, Lolita did not tell the viewers that she would "see them next Numbertime".

- Writer: Christopher Lillicrap
- Cast: Tony Bluto, Joanna Brookes, Regina Freedman, Jenny Jules, Andy McEwan, Mo Sesay
- El Nombre voices (uncredited): Sophie Aldred, Kate Robbins, Steve Steen
- Education Officer: Su Hurrell
- Music: Andrew Dodge
- Animation: Ealing Animation, Hedley Griffin, Peter Lang, Alan Rogers, Marcus Parker-Rhodes
- Film Camera: Nick Squires
- Film Sound: Eric Wisby, John Hooper
- Film Editor: Nick Hutchings
- Vision Mixers: Carol Abbott, Hilary Briegel
- Camera Supervisor: Eric Metcalfe
- Resource Co-ordinator: Roxanna White
- Studio Lighting: Bryn Edwards
- Studio Sound: Martin Deane
- Costume Design: Colin Lavers
- Make-up Design: Jane Walker
- Videotape Editor: John O'Connor
- Assistant Floor Manager: Sally Bates
- Production Manager: Oliver Cookson
- Production Assistants: Amarjit Ram, Hilary Hardaker
- Design: Bob Steer
- Executive Producer: Judy Whitfield
- Director: Andrea Christodoulou
- Series Producer: Clare Elstow
- © BBC Education MCMXCIII

In 1994, BBC Enterprises (now BBC Worldwide) released a video entitled "Number Time" (BBCV 5359, and spelled with two words), containing sixty minutes of edited highlights from this series (it was the only one at the time); it was later rereleased as the second half of a "two-on-one" video in 1997 with the Words and Pictures "Alphabet Fun Time" video (BBCV 5357), which had originally been released at around the same time and contained fifty-eight minutes of highlights from that show's 1992 series (the "two-on-one" video in question was entitled "Alphabet Fun Time and Number Time", BBCV 5987, and it was rereleased in 1999). This series was later re-released in full as a "Video Plus Pack" in 1996 - only slightly altered to remove the episodes' opening titles.

From 22 September to 1 December 1998, the BBC broadcast a "revised" version of this series as a lead-in to the sixth series; in place of Lolita, Bill (introduced in the fourth series) and Bernie (who joined him in the fifth one) introduced each episode with a number line of their own (however, Lolita's voice was still heard narrating some re-used animated sketches). All episodes except Numbers 1, 4 and 9 had the original live-action sketches replaced with the Dolls' House sketch (again, see Series 5), however in the episodes that retained the original live-action sketches, the prize scene in the Find One Plum sketch was cut, and the One Girl And Her Sheep sketch was omitted. The El Nombre sketches in the revised series were slightly lengthened, and sequences of children discussing the ten numbers (in the vein of those discussing the time-related concepts covered by the fifth series) were also introduced; although the Planet of the Eights sketch was also re-used, the vocal track was redubbed and Lolita was edited out of it. Whilst the Numbers All Around song sung by a group of children was retained in the revised series, the other two songs sang by them, the One Finger, One Thumb, Keep Moving song had the children forming the number one and shouting out it's number cut at the end of the song, and the Ten In The Bed song had a new video of the ten children in the bed whilst retaining the original song.

== Numbers Plus (1994) ==
A lively maths series, designed as a follow-on of the first series, featuring four colourful "clown-like" characters called Mo, Sappy, Grimble and Jick who live in a house together. A robot called Trundle narrates each episode and helps them with their maths. There are also animations and songs.

- Episode 1: The Barbecue (10 January 1994)

Mo, Sappy, Grimble and Jick decide to have a barbecue but first they add up how many people they're inviting to their barbecue and calculate what supplies are needed. They work out that sixteen guests and all four of themselves makes twenty people altogether. The gang learn to count in twos and fives, and Trundle shows the viewer a farmer who finds out how many sheep he has with the help of his sheepdog. Trundle naughtily knocks over the boxes of food which fall on top of Grimble and Jick rescues him but is so busy that she forgets to send out the invitations. In the end, it starts to rain so the gang decide to start the barbecue all over again tomorrow.

- Episode 2: The Picnic (17 January 1994)

It's a lovely day for picnic outdoors - and for an argument. The gang get an introduction to division by learning to share everything fairly and equally, whether that means getting a quarter of a pizza, half a can of drink, or one banana each. Grimble's in a right mood about it, but is put to shame by the tapirs, tamarins, and wild horses that Trundle shows at Marwell Zoo Park.

- Episode 3: Sort It Out (24 January 1994)

Mo takes the glass bottles to the bottle bank and leaves everybody else to sort out and clean up the house with Grimble in charge. Sappy, Grimble and Jick try to sort out the shopping by colour and then by shape. Trundle plays an odd one out game with the viewer at a Sainsbury's supermarket. When Mo comes back and sees the confusion, the gang put everything in the right places.

- Episode 4: Is It, Isn't It? (31 January 1994)

The gang learn about handling data as they open a pet shop. They try to ask people what their favourite animal is to put in their pet shop but they get it all wrong. Sappy asks the people the right question but doesn't write down the answers and Jick writes down the answers but asks the wrong question. So Grimble goes out to get it right but finds out that tigers are the world's favourite animal. So the gang have no choice but to close the pet shop down.

- Episode 5: On With The Show (7 February 1994)

The gang learn about the number one hundred as they put on a concert for one hundred people. They also learn to count in tens. Trundle shows the viewer that when someone is one hundred years old they get a birthday card from the Queen, one hundred years and runs in a game of cricket are called a century and that one hundred Roman soldiers were led by a man called a centurion. He also shows the viewer how people count the number of people in a football match, on a runaway train and in a school orchestra in special ways. Sappy in the end decides to conduct one hundred children.

- Episode 6: On The Shelf (21 February 1994)

The gang learn that everything's made to measure as Mo needs somewhere to keep her books, so Grimble and Jick decide to put up a shelf but they keep getting it a bit wrong. Trundle shows two boys who are tall and short as try to set up two goals, shows how wide goals are in sports and shows how the ancient Egyptians built pyramids using a cubit.

- Episode 7: The Big Top (28 February 1994)

The gang learn about weighing after Trundle sees a letter from a circus wanting a very light clown and wonders who is the lightest. The ringmaster gives some jobs for Mo, Sappy, Grimble and Jick to do. They clear up animal droppings, prepare hay, peanuts and greens for Big Ears (who they think is an elephant) as they weigh them first on a seesaw and mix up custard pies for the clown but Sappy and Jick don't use the scales to measure the weight of the ingredients. They soon find out that Big Ears is actually a rabbit and the ringmaster asks who of the gang is the lightest.

- Episode 8: It's My Birthday! (7 March 1994)

The gang learn about measuring time as they prepare for Grimble's birthday. Mo and Sappy go shopping for a green clock shaped birthday cake and a green alarm clock for Grimble as a birthday present and Jick makes a green jelly for Grimble. Trundle shows the viewer Big Ben and explains how monks used sand clocks which told them when to ring the monastery bell and how the ancient Romans used candles that burn down all the way to the bottom to measure time.

- Episode 9: How Much? How Many? (14 March 1994)

The gang want to buy some flowers, but first need to count their money and then work out what they can get for that amount. They are introduced to the different denominations of coins, how different combinations can be used, and the concept that a larger number of coins doesn't necessarily equate to a larger sum of money. Trundle shows the viewer a boy called Darren, who is blind and therefore has to identify coins using touch alone.

- Episode 10: All Shapes And Sizes (21 March 1994)

Mo, Sappy, Grimble, Jick and Trundle are stuck inside a board game called "Shape Master" as they find out about 2D and 3D shapes. They each have to find a shape in order to escape. Mo finds a cube, Sappy finds a cylinder, Grimble finds a pyramid and Jick finds a hexagon. Trundle explains show cubes and cuboids can easily be seen in buildings, how sticks of rock are made and how shapes like hexagons, squares, rectangles and diamonds tessellate together.

- Cast: Nicola Blackman, Tony Marshall, Jefferson Clode, Nia Davies, Stephen Kemble & Roamer, Paul J. Reeve
- Written by: Christopher Lillicrap, Charles Way
- Education Officer: Su Hurrell
- Consultants: Mike Askew, Nick Morgan
- Music: Henry Marsh
- Graphic Designer: Iain Macdonald
- Animation: Kevin Wrench, Andrew Franks
- Visual Effects and Designer: Andy Lazell
- Designer: Andrée Welstead Hornby
- Director: Neil Ben
- Producer: Judy Brooks
- © BBC Education MCMXCIV

== Series 2: Shapes (Spring 1995) ==
The second series, which is again aimed at four- to five-year-olds, comprised five episodes, focusing on the four basic two-dimensional shapes; each episode would open with Lolita standing by a mobile with the four basic shapes hanging from it and singing the series' main theme, Squares and Triangles, Circles and Rectangles as the mobile began to turn. Once it had stopped turning, she would walk to the shape that was nearest to her, then ask the viewers if they knew what it was, before it lit up and she told them - and from this series onwards, El Nombre was given two sketches per episode (the first to show Juan instances of that week's shape around the town, with Juan being clumsy and getting confronted by the other villagers after El Nombre had left, and the second to draw it in the desert sand). This series also featured four cut-out animated characters made up from the shapes its episodes were focusing on (a circular man with magical powers, a square robot with transformation powers, a triangular knight with a magical lance and a rectangular man); in the last episode, they worked together to build a house (after the rectangular man built one entirely out of rectangles, and the square robot, triangular knight and circular man transformed them into their own shapes). Each episode would end with Lolita singing an "extended" version of a song that had been heard earlier in the episode during a montage of the shape around the real world (for the last one, she continued over the credits) and setting viewers the challenge of seeing how many of that week's shape they could find before the next episode.

The first two episodes of this series were, again, originally aired as part of the Daytime on Two strand on Mondays at 9:45 am, but 8 May 1995 was the year's May Day, so its third episode was aired the following day; the last two episodes were also aired on Mondays.

- Episode 11: Circles (24 April 1995)

El Nombre shows Juan what a circle is (with a cart's wheel, a hoopla ring and a hoop with its stick), while a man named Terry introduces the world-famous "Ring a Ring o' Roses Formation Dance Team" (and their manager, Cynthia) on Come Prancing, and a prehistoric couple try to invent the round wheel (after the square and triangular ones) for their car for Great Moments in History; also, in this episode's second cut-out animated sketch, circular pawprints transform into a circular ladybird, a circular bird, a circular caterpillar (that becomes a circular butterfly), a circular fish which blows circular bubbles, a circular car which emits circular smoke from its circular exhaust, a circular man's head, and a circular bear (and in its CGI animated sketch, a circle gains two additional planes and proceeds to transform into a beach ball, a football, an orange and the planet Earth).

- Episode 12: Squares (1 May 1995)

El Nombre shows Juan what a square is (with the then-unnamed Pedro and Juanita's frame, the then-also-unnamed Señor Manuel and Señor Chipito's draughts board, The Maggot and Cactus saloon's sign and a blackboard), while Bobby Cube asks the Shape Spotters on Let's Shape Up to name the square by pointing out its distinguishing features, a square robot builds a square dog (which turns on him after catching his scent, but he scares it away by transforming into a much bigger square dog with a big square that he runs to and climbs up), and Jill Scoop reports on Old King Cole who is wanting his square bowl (after round, triangular and rectangular ones) for Newsdesk; also, for this episode's CGI animated sketch, the yellow square in the bottom-right of a gameboard rises out of it to become a cube and has the numbers 1-6 written on each of its sides (which proceed to transform into six groups of dots of those respective numbers as the cube becomes the dice in a game of Snakes and Ladders).

- Episode 13: Triangles (9 May 1995)

El Nombre shows Juan what a triangle is (with a musical triangle, a roadworks sign and a stepladder), while Aladdin finds the lamp with a triangle on it (after the ones with a circle and square on them) for his Uncle Abanazer, but he wastes its three wishes (one for each of the triangle's sides and corners) by turning Abanazer into a cat, and himself into a mouse, as well as making it disappear (which causes Abanazer to turn on him, but they both questioned why there was not a Genie in the lamp when asked); a triangular knight also sets out to slay a triangular dragon (but gets burned to a crisp the first attempt, and gets rained on along with the triangular dragon's fire getting put out the second attempt) while Bobby Cube asks the Shape Spotters on Let's Shape Up (who are the same ones from the previous episode, but have swapped positions) to identify the triangle (again, by pointing out its distinguishing features to them). Also, for this episode's CGI animated sketch, a triangle has a dotted line drawn inside it, then folds up to become a triangular-based pyramid, and rotates to show the numbers 1–4 on its sides as they light up before unfolding back into a triangle again.

- Episode 14: Rectangles (15 May 1995)

El Nombre shows Juan what a rectangle is (with a plank of wood, the cart's side and the then-still-unnamed Pedro and Juanita's piece of cardboard), while Sammy Shape pays a visit to Old Mother Hubbard's cottage to find out "what makes a rectangle a rectangle" for Shapewatch (which, like the Crime Spot sketch from the previous series, is a spoof of Crimewatch) and met by her dog (who, as in the nursery rhyme, wants a bone, but they find a rectangular biscuit instead), a rectangular man goes for a swim at a swimming pool (after walking up a staircase, taking an elevator and walking up another staircase), Humpty Dumpty is asked to identify the shape of one of the bricks in the wall he is sitting on (which he does just before he falls), and a woman named Jane keeps in touch with her grandmother by writing a rectangular letter, posting it into a postbox which has a rectangular slot and door, then arriving at her house after she receives it.

- Episode 15: Shapes Together (22 May 1995)

El Nombre helps Juan remember which shape is which (with the square frame, the circular hoop with its stick, a rectangular book and the triangular roadworks sign), while the rectangular man, the square robot, the triangular knight, and the circular man (who now has a circular body and a wheel for a foot) work together to build a house (after the rectangular man built one entirely out of rectangles, and the square robot, triangular knight and circular man transformed them into their own shapes) and show that "all different shapes work well together", Bobby Cube asks the Shape Spotters on Let's Shape Up to identify the "Shy Shapes" hiding in a cola can and Battenberg cake, and a rectangle folds up to become a hollow cylinder as two circles cover its ends and a second rectangle wraps itself around it as it becomes a can of baked beans; also, in this episode's second El Nombre sketch, Juan draws "El Nombre" (a square, rectangle, circle, and triangle stacked on top of each other), before drawing "the rope that hits him on the head and knocks him over". El Nombre then says that it has never happened to him - so Juan swings a rope at him, and tells him "It has now!". The sombrero-less El Nombre then chases Juan through the streets of the town to an extended version of his theme song (with the new tagline "Drawing shapes in the desert sand" at the end), but he never catches him; this is also the only old-style episode to only have one live-action sketch in it (rather than two or three).

- Cast: Gary Beadle, Carolyn Bonnyman, Mike Hayley, Anastasia Mulrooney, René Zagger
- Written by: Christopher Lillicrap
- El Nombre voices (uncredited): Sophie Aldred, Kate Robbins, Steve Steen
- Music: Mark Blackledge, Andrew Dodge, Sue Herrod/Seán de Paor
- Animations: Baxter Hobbins Slides Ltd, Ealing Animation, Frameline, Alan Rogers & Peter Lang
- Studio Resources Manager: Steve Lowry
- Camera Supervisor: John Hoare
- Sound: Dave Goodwin
- Lighting Director: Geoff Beech
- Costume Design: Rosie Cheshire
- Make-up Design: Judith Gill-Dougherty
- Vision Mixer: Carol Abbott
- Assistant Floor Manager: Sally Bates
- Graphic Designer: Ellen Monaghan
- Set Designer: Eric Walmsley
- Videotape Editor: St. John O'Rorke
- Executive Producer: Stacey Adams
- Studio Director: Phil Chilvers
- Production Team: Debby Black, Su Hurrell
- Producer: Kristin Mason
- © BBC Education MCMXCV

In 1996, both this series and the next series were released on VHS as "Video Plus Packs" by BBC Educational Publishing (now BBC Active); the following year, they were also rereleased together as a double "Video Plus Pack" named "Numbertime Shapes/Side by Side".

After the corporate change in 1997, BBC Education's then-current Internet address (http://www.bbc.co.uk/education/) was superimposed onto the four shapes (a red circle, a green triangle, a yellow square and a blue rectangle) seen at the end of this series' episodes, as well as the thirteen episodes of the next two series; however, it was never added to the end of the first series' episodes.

== Series 3: Side by Side (Autumn 1995, broadcast Spring 1996) ==
The third series (which is, once again, aimed at four- to five-year-olds) comprised five episodes, focusing on the concept of prepositions; each episode would open with Lolita singing the series' main theme, Under, Over, Everywhere (the mobile from the previous series was also visible in the background, but it now had an apple, three stickmen, a rainbow, a cloud with a hot-air balloon, a sun, a snake, a spider and a snail hanging from it). In this series, Juan gained three new friends named Pedro Gonzales, Juanita Conchita, and Maria Consuela Tequila Chiquita (Pedro and Juanita had also previously appeared in the second series), as well as a pet tarantula named Tanto - and each episode would end with Lolita reciting a rhyme or singing a song (but that in the second episode was an extended version of one that had been heard in voiceover earlier in the episode during an animated sketch about a fox). A sketch in the second episode of this series also parodied EastEnders as "GreenGrocers"; this was also the first series to credit the El Nombre voice actors at the end of its last episode (Sophie Aldred, who had played Ace on Doctor Who as well as one of the presenters of Words and Pictures, Spitting Image impressionist Kate Robbins, who had also voiced Jemima Wellington-Green on Round the Bend, and Steve Steen, who had played Lord Byron in Ink and Incapability, the second episode of Blackadder the Third). Although this series was made in Autumn 1995, it was not broadcast until 28 February 1996.

This series and the next one were originally aired on Wednesdays in the Daytime on Two strand at 10:25 am; this series also premiered after a rerun of the second one finished, and the next one premiered when Daytime on Two returned after a two-week Easter break.

- Episode 16: Up, Down, On, and Off (28 February 1996)

Juan does not have anything to do for the school concert so El Nombre tells him that he can recite Incy Wincy Spider with Tanto, a bear flies a kite (but it comes down in a tree, so he has to climb it to retrieve it), a window cleaner is annoyed by the incompetence of her colleague, Juan recites Incy Wincy Spider at the school concert (but Tanto will not come down the drainpipe, so El Nombre has to coax him) and three clowns named Boris, Doris and Ethel compete to see which one can raise the biggest laugh in Give Us a Giggle.

- Episode 17: In Front of, Behind, Before, and After (6 March 1996)

Juan wants to take a photograph of himself and Mama together (but cannot because he is behind the Polaroid), an engine driver pulls some wagons behind (but the coupling snaps when he goes up a hill, so when they roll back down they are in front of him, and he has to signal for the driver of a second engine to help him), Jack and Jill must take Farmer Giles's horse and cart to market in Happy Ever After, a fox hides in his secret lair to escape a hunt (accompanied by a rhyme from Lolita in voiceover), Juan still does not have a photograph of himself and Mama together (so El Nombre takes it himself and blows himself up in the process), and the proprietor of GreenGrocers tries to get his four customers of the day to stand behind his stall and form a proper queue (until he gets upstaged by a toy salesman).

- Episode 18: Under, Over, On Top of, and Beneath (13 March 1996)

Juan cannot score a goal past Pedro so El Nombre (who is not seen in his usual outfit in this episode, but what would later become Santo Flamingo United's strip) tells him to kick the ball over him, Princess Perfect wants a bed fit for a princess (in the sense of not being able to feel a pea under the mattress), a tortoise named Toby goes to a party but cannot get over the hedge to it (unlike the four other guests of a bird, a frog, a squirrel and a rabbit, but the last of them tells him to go under the hedge instead), Pedro is standing on a stool so Juan again cannot score past him (until El Nombre tells him to kick the ball under him, and when Pedro objects, they reduce the size of the goal, but El Nombre whispers to Juan to kick the ball to one side of Pedro before he leaves), and the Cow (of Hey Diddle Diddle) is scared of having to jump over the Moon (so the Little Dog volunteers the Dish instead, but he suggests running under it).

- Episode 19: Beside, Around, and Between (20 March 1996)

Mama wants to go to Hurrell's store but there is a hole in the ground in front of it (so El Nombre and Juan tell her to walk around it), a doll pushes three building blocks with the numbers 1–3 on them together (but a breakdown-truck-driving clown accidentally crashes into them and scatters them, so he has to help her rearrange them again), Darren and Sharon Jam cannot make a mutual decision on where to put their new table on Lucky Lottery Winners, Mama has come out of Hurrell's store (but cannot help thinking there is another way around the hole, so El Nombre tells her that if she is brave like him, she can jump across it, but when he falls down it, she opts to go around it again instead), and Lord and Lady Posh give instructions to their gardener, Jarvis, on where he has to plant their roses and daisies.

- Episode 20: In, Out, and Through (27 March 1996)

Juan has lost Tanto so El Nombre helps him and Mama to find him, the bear from the first episode tries to boil a saucepan of water over a fire but its bottom is missing, a magician turns her volunteer's watch and keys into an alarm clock and one big key, and two burglars named Bob and Bert break into a sweet shop and eat all the sweets but grow too fat to escape through the window so they get caught by a policeman named PC Nabb; from this point onwards, El Nombre also returned to one sketch per episode (except for in Episodes 21 and 26).

- Cast: Anthony Barclay, Laura Brattan, Joanna Brookes, Paul Cawley, Simon Corris, Chris Emmett, Mike Hayley, Brian Miller, Anastasia Mulrooney, Issy Van Randwyck, Elisabeth Sladen
- Written by: Andrew Bernhardt
- El Nombre written by: Christopher Lillicrap
- El Nombre voices: Sophie Aldred, Kate Robbins, Steve Steen
- Music: Mark Blackledge, Andrew Dodge
- Animations: Baxter Hobbins Slides Ltd, Ealing Animation, Malcolm Hartley, Alan Rogers and Peter Lang
- Studio Resources Manager: Steve Lowry
- Camera Supervisor: Roger Goss
- Sound: Dave Goodwin
- Lighting Director: Chris Kempton
- Vision Mixer: Carol Abbott
- Assistant Floor Manager: Jane Litherland
- Costume Design: Rosie Cheshire
- Make-Up Designer: Judith Gill-Dougherty
- Graphic Designer: Ellen Monaghan
- Set Designer: Gina Parr
- Videotape Editor: St. John O'Rorke
- Education Officer: Su Hurrell
- Studio Director: Phil Chilvers
- Production Team: Debby Black, Jane Straw
- Producer: Kristin Mason
- © BBC MCMXCV

== Series 4: More or Less (Spring/Summer 1996) ==
The fourth series, which is aimed at five- to six-year-olds, comprised eight episodes focusing on the concepts of "more than" (addition) and "less than" (subtraction); each episode would open with Lolita singing the series' main theme, More or Less, in a studio filled with pillars. This series introduced the character of Bill (voiced by Paul Cawley), a green bird who could swallow and regurgitate almost any object whole - and from the fifth series onwards, he was joined by a purple cat named Bernie (voiced by Laura Brattan), later going on to appear at the beginning of each "revised" first-, sixth- and seventh-series episode. This series also featured a toad named Test, who would hop along the heads of fifteen multicoloured people lined up to form a numberline by the amounts its episodes were focusing on (they all wore red jumpers with the numbers 1–15 on them, but when Test was on their heads, the colour of their jumpers would change to green); each episode would end with Lolita singing a song (for the last one, she again continued over the credits, and it was also her final appearance, but because she did not know that she would be relieved of her presenting duties back then, she still told the viewers that she would "see them next Numbertime"). Two sketches in the first and seventh episodes of this series also parodied Percy Thrower and Sir David Attenborough as "Percy Grower" and "David Attencoat", while a third one in the third episode parodied Surprise, Surprise as "What a Surprise" (with Cinderella receiving a surprise visit from her Fairy Godmother) - and the Bill sketches of the second and sixth episodes also featured an enormous (but unnamed) beetle who chased after Bill after putting his feet into the eight wellingtons he regurgitated (in the second episode) and fell on top of him after pulling his last two wellingtoned legs up off a wall he was standing in front of (in the sixth episode), while the fourth episode featured a "female" version of Bill who fell on top of him after he shook twenty mangoes off a tree. In the El Nombre sketches of the seventh and last episodes, Juan had his fifth birthday for the second time (only this time, Pedro, Juanita and Maria all brought him an extra candle for his cake because he was one year older, so he ended up with eight), and El Nombre's town gained a female mayor who also happened to be a balloon seller named Señora Fedora.

- Episode 21: One More (17 April 1996)

A little old woman, a little old man and their little old cat enlist the help of one more friend (the Little Old Mouse) to help pull up their enormous turnip for Growing Bigger, Little Juan needs to play two cymbals (not one), Test hops from 3 to 7, contestant Sharon plays Find One More in order to win two prizes the same, Bill adds four flowers together and Juan needs to hit the cymbals one more time (to make four hits); also, in this episode's second animated sketch, a rather slow butterfly tries to keep up with his much faster friends, but when he joins them on a tree, he causes the branch they are standing on to break under their weight and they all fly away.

- Episode 22: Two More (24 April 1996)

Freda Fantastic from Fantastic Fairytales presents The Elves and the Shoemaker, Little Juan and El Nombre juggle with seven of Mama's tomatoes which they shouldn't play with, Test hops from 7 to 13, Fred Fantastic of Fantastic Fairytales presents The Frog Prince, and Bill adds together eight wellingtons which belong to an enormous beetle (and when the beetle puts his feet into them, he chases after him); also, in this episode's second animated sketch, Noah will not let a mammoth come onto the Ark because there is only one of him, so he disguises himself as a pair of bears with two puppets and a tarpaulin, but he quickly gets discovered by Noah again.

- Episode 23: Three More (1 May 1996)

A ladybird's nine babies and three extra are saved from a fire that's really smoke from her husband Arnold's barbecue, Little Juan and his friends are about to have Mama's very hot chili with tacos but there are only three chairs, Test hops from 2 to 8, Fairy Godmother presents What a Surprise with some surprising results for Cinderella, and Bill puts twelve books up on a shelf which ends with the shelf falling down under the books' weight; also, in this episode's second animated sketch, a kiwi notices his (three-toed) footprints in the sand and tries to count them, but finds it too hard to count in threes and eventually gives up by running away from the camera.

- Episode 24: Five More (8 May 1996)

Snow White goes to the Wild Wood Takeaway and gets seven Good Fairy Cakes (declining cashier Grimbleshanks' first offer, Toad Burgers) for the dwarves' tea as it is Dopey's birthday, Little Juan accidentally blows Juanita's balloon up five more times which then bursts, Test hops from 1 to 11, Jack's mother will not let him climb up the beanstalk as it only has ten leaves on it (and it needs fifteen to get her to change her mind), and Bill shakes twenty mangoes off a tree which ends with a "female" version of himself falling on top of him; also, in this episode's second stop-motion animated sketch, a Tyrannosaurus Rex plans to eat a small Triceratops, but gets scared away when five larger Triceratopses, followed up by another five more behind them, suddenly appear behind their friend to protect him.

- Episode 25: One Less (15 May 1996)

A magician makes six red balls disappear one at a time, Little Juan and his friends play musical chairs but they all have a chair to sit on, Test hops from 12 to 8, Carlotta Bottle tries to sing Ten Green Bottles but the bottles "don't-a fall-a" because property master Reg is not on hand to knock them down, and Bill eats three apples off a tree which ends with the branch he is standing on breaking under his weight and the zero he was displaying hitting him on the head; also, in this episode's second animated sketch, three dogs wait to be picked by prospective new owners at a pet shop (when there is only one remaining, he does a dance with a hat and cane to pass the time).

- Episode 26: Two Less (22 May 1996)

Rebecca Testament reports for Numbertime News and interviews Mr. Noah and one of his sons, Ham, who used to have only six animals on the ark (two elephants, two lions and two doves), Little Juan and Tanto set out to get two melons for Mama's pie ("Melon Surprise") as a surprise but Señor Manuel the greengrocer has to save two of his melons for a special customer, Test hops from 10 to 4, a woman wins two coconuts and then another two coconuts from a total of eight on a shy, Bill subtracts six of the enormous beetle's wellingtons (who then falls on top of him), and Little Juan finds out that Señor Manuel's special customer is Mama all along who already has two melons; also, in this episode's second animated sketch, two monkeys get into an argument over two bananas which ends with them falling off their tree.

- Episode 27: Three Less (5 June 1996)

The Early Bird loses all nine of his worms (and it is all David Attencoat's fault for saying that it isn't raining), Little Juan has his fifth birthday for the second time (but there are more than five candles on his birthday cake), Test hops from 11 to 5, Humpty Dumpty is scared of heights (so the crew members have to take all nine bricks of the wall away three at a time), and Bill watches nine leaves blow off a tree before winter comes, which ends with him being covered in snow; also, in this episode's second animated sketch (the recurring refrain of which is "Oh, no!"), three pegs blow off a washing line, three petals fall off three eight-petalled flowers (leaving five), a tricycle hits a stone and all three of its wheels fall off, three sides of a picture frame fall down (leaving one), and three mice steal three biscuits from a plate of eight (leaving five), one of whom only comes back to leave a note in front of the plate saying "Oh yes!".

- Episode 28: Five Less (12 June 1996)

The magician from the fifth episode now makes fifteen beads disappear under three beakers five at a time, Little Juan almost floats away with six of Señora Fedora's balloons, Test hops from 13 to 3, Simple Simon has to find a penny for five of the Pieman's fifteen pies but they have all been sold to Old Mother Hubbard, Little Jack Horner and the Queen of Hearts by the time he does, and Bill recycles fifteen glass bottles (five green, five clear and five brown); also, in this episode's second animated sketch, an enormous snail eats a total of twenty trees from four gardens, and scares away a much smaller snail, a goat, a cow and a flock of birds as he descends on each of them.

- Cast: Anthony Barclay, Laura Brattan, Joanna Brookes, Otiz Cannelloni, Paul Cawley, Simon Corris, Chris Emmett, Mike Hayley, Brian Miller, Anastasia Mulrooney, Issy Van Randwyck, Elisabeth Sladen
- Written by: Christopher Lillicrap
- El Nombre voices: Sophie Aldred, Kate Robbins, Steve Steen
- Music: Mark Blackledge, Andrew Dodge, Derek Nash
- Animations: Ealing Animation, Arril Johnson, Alan Rogers and Peter Lang
- Studio Resources Manager: Steve Lowry
- Camera Supervisor: Roger Goss
- Sound: Dave Goodwin
- Lighting Director: Chris Kempton
- Vision Mixer: Carol Abbott
- Assistant Floor Manager: Jane Litherland
- Costume Design: Rosie Cheshire
- Make-Up Designer: Judith Gill-Dougherty
- Graphic Designer: Ellen Monaghan
- Set Designer: Gina Parr
- Videotape Editor: Paul Hagan
- Education Officer: Su Hurrell
- Studio Director: Phil Chilvers
- Production Team: Debby Black, Jane Quinn
- Producer: Kristin Mason
- © BBC MCMXCVI

In 1997, this series was released on VHS as a "Video Plus Pack" by BBC Educational Publishing, and on 16 May 2013 it was rereleased on DVD as a "DVD Plus Pack" by BBC Active (as they are now known) with an accompanying teachers' book, but it is now out of print.

== Series 5: Time (Winter 1997, broadcast Spring 1998) ==
The fifth series, which is aimed at four- to six-year-olds, comprised ten episodes focusing on time-related concepts; (which the BBC previously covered in their maths programme Numbers Plus in the episode "It's My Birthday!") given that Lolita had been relieved of her presenting duties by this point, each episode was introduced by an animated man with a pocket watch for a head (who also appeared in a musical sketch at the end of the sixth episode). In this series, El Nombre's town was given the name of Santo Flamingo (its name was first heard in the sixth episode in reference to their local football team, although the sign above the doorway of its newly built school read "San Flamingo School"), and Juan gained a new teacher named Constanza Bonanza - and all except two of the episodes had sketches featuring a rarely speaking man named Tim (played by Toby Jones) who was coming to an understanding with time-related concepts (in fact, the only time he spoke was in the seventh episode, when he read out the text "Cook for half an hour" on the box of a big pie he had bought). This series also introduced the recurring sketch of the Dolls' House, which featured a cowgirl named Annie (played by Victoria Gay), a scarecrow named Scrap (played by Paul Cawley), a robot named Glimmer (played by Ashley Artus with a Geordie accent), a clock named Ticker (played by Mike Hayley), and from the sixth series onwards, a butler named Branston (played by Brian Miller); they were frequently visited by a pirate named Captain Kevin (played by Roger Griffiths), and on three occasions by a mechanic named Megamax (played by Fidel Nanton), Glimmer's girlfriend Princess Penelope (who had come to visit Scrap when he was ill and ate all his chocolates) and a Russian ballet dancer named Nadia Nokoblokov (who had come to perform Fryderyk Franciszek Chopin's Minute Waltz). For the seventh series, they were also frequently visited by a detective named Shelley Holmes (played by Issy Van Randwyck) - however, this recurring sketch would only go on until the end of that series. Although this series was made after the corporate change in Winter 1997 (as evidenced by the then-new BBC logo at the end of each episode), it was not broadcast until 13 January 1998.

This series and the next one were originally aired on Tuesdays as part of the then-newly renamed Schools Programmes strand at 9:45 am.

- Episode 29: Night and Day (13 January 1998)

In this first new-style episode, Tim wakes up in the middle of the night, brushes his teeth and pours himself a bowl of corn flakes (but has to wait until the morning for the milk), Little Juan wakes up all the other villagers because he does not know that a fiesta is held in the evening (rather than the morning or the afternoon), the residents of the Dolls' House take turns in getting their meals ready and Bill takes a Polaroid of both himself and his new co-star Bernie (who came in covered in mud, so he has to give her a bath before taking another one), but Bill got himself covered in mud while trying to get her in the bath, so she takes another Polaroid of him to show him.

- Episode 30: Days of the Week (20 January 1998)

Tim sets off to referee a football match (but the forecast for that day is "windy", so he has to change into his best suit), Little Juan has football practice but cannot remember which day it is on, Bill decides to go on holiday to get away from the rain (but leaves Bernie behind with only seven cans of cat food, one for each day of the week, and a can opener) and Scrap and Glimmer get into an argument over a teddy bear so Captain Kevin has to sort it out; also, not only is the newspaper in this episode's Tim sketch dated from before the BBC's corporate change (10 April 1997), but it is factually incorrect, as it says that day was a Monday, when it was in fact a Thursday.

- Episode 31: Sequencing Events (27 January 1998)

Tim tries to put on his new suit with a jacket, a pair of trousers, a hat, a pair of shoes, a pair of socks and a tie but keeps doing it in the wrong order, El Nombre helps Mama to make Delietta Smith (who is obviously a parody of Delia Smith)'s wonderful omelette with red and green peppers, Bill wakes Bernie up for dinnertime but forgets all about the food, and Scrap and Glimmer try to make a chocolate splodge cake for Annie; this is also the first episode to refer to the Dolls' House by name, despite being the third one in this series.

- Episode 32: Comparison of Time (3 February 1998)

Tim grows two flowers and photographs them but cannot wait for the third, Pedro bets Juan he can find a spider who is faster than Tanto, Bernie wants to get an apple off a tree but cannot reach it (so Bill offers to fly up there, but when he learns he cannot, he challenges her to a tower-building contest) and Megamax is coming for tea at the Dolls' House so Annie, Scrap and Glimmer have to paint it, but the latter runs down, so when Megamax arrives, he deduces that he needs a new battery and gives him the "Max Pack Turbo Booster" to fix him.

- Episode 33: Clock Face (10 February 1998)

El Nombre helps Little Juan to find out some things about the clock face for his homework, Scrap and Glimmer are bored so they decide to give Ticker's spring a big clean, and Bill trips over the sleeping Bernie and flies into his clock, causing all its numbers and both its hands to fall off; when he has put them all back on (with the help of Bernie), the clock's cuckoo calls at 3:00 and causes him to faint.

- Episode 34: O'Clock (24 February 1998)

Little Juan and his friends prepare to go on a school outing to see Santo Flamingo United playing in the cup final at 3:00, Bernie takes a nap at 2:00 but Bill plays a prank on her by moving the clock an hour ahead and waking her up by replacing the cuckoo, and Scrap waits for the postwoman to deliver his new "Scrap Jacket" (which he had been going on about all night and keeping Glimmer from getting sleep).

- Episode 35: Half Past (3 March 1998)

Tim (saying his only line, "Cook for half an hour", in this episode) cooks a big pie he has bought, but gets bored while waiting so eats all his other groceries, Scrap is ill so Annie asks Glimmer to take his temperature every hour and give him his medicine every half-hour (but his girlfriend, Princess Penelope, comes to visit), Bernie is enjoying a "cattuccino" at the foot of a Big Ben-like clock tower until Bill bungee-jumps from its minute hand, steals it when he springs back up to its face, drinks it and returns the empty cup to her, and Pedro, Juanita, and Maria all agree to meet Juan for a game of football at 2:30 (but Juan wonders how he will know when it is 2:30).

- Episode 36: Timing of Events (10 March 1998)

Tim has hiccups and tries to get rid of them by drinking a glass of water then holding his breath for ten seconds (but gets interrupted by a crank phone call the first time, and a crank door-caller the second time), San Flamingo School is holding a three-legged race as a part of their sports day, Bill and Bernie prepare to launch each other into outer space using only a seesaw, and Nadia Nokoblokov comes to visit the Dolls' House because she needs someone to help her out with her new dance (Fryderyk Franciszek Chopin's Minute Waltz).

- Episode 37: Months and Seasons (17 March 1998)

Tim receives a mysterious three-layered parcel on his doorstep in the middle of the night (which turns out to be a birthday cake) along with a musical birthday card (which plays a high-speed version of Happy Birthday to You to him), while El Nombre helps Juan and Juanita to put the four seasons in the right order for their homework (but they still have to draw a picture for each one), Bernie puts a smile on the face of a snowman (that turns out to be Bill) in winter, then the snow melts and some blossom grows on a tree in spring, Bill waters some flowers to help them grow and Bernie mows the lawn in summer, the leaves blow off the tree in autumn and Bernie throws a snowball at Bill and skates on the ice in winter before putting another smile on the face of another snowman (which, again, is Bill); the residents of the Dolls' House also have to organise their clothes for each season (but Glimmer thinks they are throwing them away).

- Episode 38: Telling the Time (24 March 1998)

In his last appearance, Tim is woken up by a train, then eats a bowl of corn flakes, drinks a cup of coffee and builds a house of cards as three more trains pass (the last one causes him to knock it down), Ticker is broken because Annie, Scrap and Glimmer did not oil him when he asked so Captain Kevin gives him one of his spare ship's bells as a replacement, Bill and Bernie test each other's knowledge of time with their clock (and Bill gets two of them wrong), and Miss Constanza Bonanza, Pedro, Juanita and Mama all remind Juan that it is choir practice at 4:30, it is football practice at 5:00, to come to her house for tea at 5:30, and to return home at 6:00 respectively.

- Writers: Andrew Bernhardt, Toby Jones, Christopher Lillicrap
- Cast: Ashley Artus, Paul Cawley, Victoria Gay, Roger Griffiths, Mike Hayley, Tania Levey, Fidel Nanton, Issy Van Randwyck (Dolls' House), Toby Jones (Tim), Sophie Aldred, Kate Robbins, Steve Steen (El Nombre)
- Bill and Bernie (uncredited): Laura Brattan, Paul Cawley
- Music: Neil Ben, Mark Blackledge, Andrew Dodge, Richard Durrant, Derek Nash, Sandy Nuttgens
- Animations: Ealing Animation, Alan Rogers & Peter Lang, Ian Sachs
- Studio Resources Manager: Steve Lowry
- Sound: Dave Goodwin
- Lighting: Alan Jeffery
- Assistant Floor Manager: Alice Oldfield
- Costume Design: Rosie Cheshire
- Make-Up Design: Judith Gill-Dougherty
- Graphic Designer: Anne Smith
- Set Designer: Gina Parr
- Editor: St. John O'Rorke
- Education Officer: Su Hurrell
- Production Team: Helen Chase, Karen Keith, Debby Black
- Studio Director: Phil Chilvers
- Executive Producer: Anne Brogan
- Producer: Kristin Mason
- © BBC MCMXCVII

The four shapes seen at the end of this series' episodes had been redesigned from those of the three previous ones, and were differently coloured to their originals as well (the circle was now green, the triangle was now yellow and the square was now red, but the rectangle kept its old-style colour of blue); also, in 1999, this series was released on VHS as a "Video Plus Pack" by BBC Educational Publishing.

== Series 6: Numbers 11 to 20 (Winter 1998, broadcast Spring 1999) ==
The sixth series (which is, again, aimed at five- to six-year-olds) comprised all ten episodes focusing on the numbers 11, 12, 13, 14, 15, 16, 17 18, 19 and 20, although 13, 14, 16, 18 and 19 are rather rare. Each episode would open with Bill and Bernie finding the position of the episode's number on their number line (which had been carried over from the "revised" version of the first series that was produced in 1998) - and in this series, Santo Flamingo gained an ice-cream seller named Señor Gelato, a carpenter named Señor Chipito (who had, once again, previously appeared in the second series as the owner of "The Maggot and Cactus" saloon) and a bandit named Don Fandango (who stole twenty gold coins from its newly built bank, which was managed by Señor Calculo, in the last episode). This series also saw former Blue Peter host Janet Ellis joining the El Nombre cast; although this series was made in Winter 1998, it was not broadcast until 12 January 1999.

- Episode 39: Number 11 (12 January 1999)

Eleven soldiers (ten in two rows of five and the eleventh on the bottom) march around and ten of them make up the number eleven, Little Juan and his friends are preparing to go on a second school outing, this time to play a football match (but they only have ten football shirts, and El Nombre writes the episode's number in the desert sand), and Scrap receives a "Soccerbox" football game from his great-aunt Laura Litterbin (but it disappoints him as he does not like football, and one of the eleven white players goes missing).

- Episode 40: Number 12 (19 January 1999)

Now in song, a pair of green slugs eat a gardener's twelve plants (that are in three rows of four) and make the number twelve, Juan bets Juanita that he can do more skips than her (he also mistakenly pronounces her surname as "Chiquita" in this episode) and Pedro bets both of them he can do more than either of them (but when doing it, he counts as fast as he can), and Captain Kevin does not want Branston to mention the number twelve as it reminds him of the final voyage of the good ship Rusty Bucket (when its crew found twelve biscuits).

- Episode 69: Number 13 (TBA)

Thirteen balls (in three rows of four and one underneath) kept rolling around, Mama had told Juan and Pedro to that Señor Gelato is having a lucky day (and they have to help him with thirteen lucky charms, but Juan initially thinks he wanted to help him), and Annie was doing some dancing in the lounge of the Dolls' House (but Scrap, rather badly, wasn't very good if he had done thirteen steps).

- Episode 41: Number 15 (26 January 1999)

Fifteen cars (in three rows of five) go nowhere and nobody seems to care, Señor Gelato accidentally drives his ice-cream tricycle into a three-legged table that Mama had told Juan and Pedro to take in to Señor Chipito for repairing (and they have to get a replacement wheel with fifteen spokes, but Juan initially thinks that it has more as he cannot tell which one he had started counting from), and Scrap and Glimmer are playing marbles in the lounge of the Dolls' House (but Glimmer is losing, rather badly, and his ten red marbles go missing). (TBA)

- Episode 42: Number 17 (2 February 1999)

Seventeen windows (in four rows of four and one upon the door) on a building open up and the lights switch on when it gets dark, El Nombre helps Juan, Pedro and Señor Gelato pick up all seventeen of Señor Manuel's tomatoes and put them in a bag, and Scrap eats three lots of cake mix that is supposed to be for three of the twenty cakes for Captain Kevin's birthday party.

- Episode 43: Number 20 (9 February 1999)

A spaceship beams up twenty stars (that are in four rows of five) then beams them down again in the constellation of the number twenty, Don Fandango steals twenty gold coins from the bank of Santo Flamingo (but Tanto bites a hole in his bag causing them all to fall out), and Nadia Nokoblokov pays another visit to the Dolls' House to perform another dance ("The Dance of Twenty Turns") in its conservatory; however, Ticker (whose role in the Dolls' House sketches had been lessened by this point) realises that if he stays in the bedroom, he does not have to watch, and Scrap eats a cake he had been told to put twenty candles on so Annie and Nadia punish him by putting him on the revolving podium that Nadia had brought with her for the dance and telling Glimmer to force him to do twenty "fast" turns on it. Clips from the first series (both incarnations) and the fourth series were also re-used in a musical sketch at the end of this episode.

- Writers: Andrew Bernhardt, Christopher Lillicrap
- Cast: Ashley Artus, Laura Brattan, Paul Cawley, Victoria Gay, Roger Griffiths, Mike Hayley, Tania Levey, Brian Miller
- El Nombre cast: Sophie Aldred, Janet Ellis, Kate Robbins, Steve Steen
- Music: Neil Ben, Mark Blackledge, Andrew Dodge, Richard Durrant, Derek Nash, Sandy Nuttgens
- Animations: Ealing Animation, Alan Rogers and Peter Lang
- Studio Resources Manager: Steve Lowry
- Camera Supervisor: Roger Goss
- Sound Supervisor: Dave Goodwin
- Lighting Director: Alan Rixon
- Vision Mixer: Hilary Briegel
- Floor Manager: Tom Hood
- Assistant Floor Manager: Alice Oldfield
- Costume Designer: Rosie Cheshire
- Make-Up Designer: Judith Gill-Dougherty
- Graphic Designer: Tom Brooks
- Set Designer: Gina Parr
- Videotape Editor: David Austin
- Education Officer: Jenny Towers
- Executive Producer: Clare Elstow
- Studio Director: Robin Carr
- Production Team: Debby Black, Liz Holmes
- Producer: Kristin Mason
- © BBC MCMXCVIII

In 2000, both this series and the following one were released on VHS as "Video Plus Packs" by BBC Educational Publishing; on 4 May 2012, this one was re-released on DVD as a "DVD Plus Pack" by BBC Active, with an accompanying teachers' book. The pack also contained an audio CD, featuring songs from the series (and initially released as an audio cassette) - and this one is still in print.

== Series 7: Numbers up to 100 (Autumn/Winter 1999) ==
The seventh series, which is once again aimed at five- to six-year-olds, comprised five episodes focusing on how to add and identify two-figure numbers up to 100; each episode would open with Bill and Bernie, whose number line had been replaced by a number square, and joined by a caterpillar named Limo (voiced by Peter Temple), who would crawl around the square to count out the numbers they required. In Santo Flamingo, Maria's sister Pepita Consuela Tequila Chiquita also started at San Flamingo School.

This series, which is the Dolls' House's last, was originally aired on Thursdays as part of the Schools Programmes strand at 10:50 am.

- Episode 44: Counting On and Back (4 November 1999)

Bernie stacks up twenty-nine plates (thrown to her by Bill), but does not know what comes after 29 so asks Limo to help; every time she stacks up ten more, she has to ask him again, but when she gets to 100, they fall over as a result of their weight. Scrap has also lost all except one of his fifty buttons so Shelley Holmes helps him to find them again, while Señor Gelato has only one cornet left so Juan volunteers to go down to Hurrell's store and get twenty-four more - but as he is about to set off, he is asked to get three extra ones.

- Episode 45: Missing Numbers (11 November 1999)

While dusting the number square, Bernie sneezes four of the numbers (18, 46, 69 and 83) out of it; after Limo has put them all back in, Bernie dusts Bill's beak, causing him to sneeze the entire number square over. Maria's sister Pepita also starts at San Flamingo School (which viewers see the inside of for the first time), while Glimmer cooks apple pie and custard (his Aunt Dimity's very own recipe) but Scrap has got the pages of his cookbook mixed up and Limo has to put four more numbers (24, 38, 77 and 96) back into the number square.

- Episode 46: Counting in Tens (18 November 1999)

Bernie is tired so she decides to have forty winks, and Limo counts them by crawling along each row of the number square; Scrap is also tired of licking envelopes (containing invitations to Glimmer's birthday party), while Juan takes all the money that he has saved up in his donkey bank to Santo Flamingo Bank and Bill and Bernie ask Limo if he can find the numbers 30 and 90 and add on ten.

- Episode 47: Patterns of Ten (25 November 1999)

Bill makes twelve sandwiches and ten iced buns for a party (and Bernie makes ten more of both, but they both make ten rock cakes each), while Scrap and Glimmer are making party bags for a party of their own, Señora Fedora opens the 15th Annual Santo Flamingo Egg Festival and chooses Mama to make its giant omelette (for which she needs sixty-one eggs but only has twenty-one) and Bill and Bernie eat thirty of the "goodies" that they have made for their party, but Bill drops the ten remaining buns and Bernie slides on their remains into him causing him to drop ten of the sandwiches, and when they decide to have a dance he throws the ten of the remaining twelve into the air.

- Episode 48: Patterns of Five (2 December 1999)

Bill has been shopping and bought twenty packs of five fish fingers (but forgot the chips, as Bernie finds out once she has put them all in the freezer), while Glimmer is painting a five-dot pattern, and San Flamingo School is holding a jumble sale; this was also the final episode to feature the Dolls' House (and although it credits Victoria Gay at the end of it, she did not appear as Annie in this series).

- Writers: Andrew Bernhardt, Christopher Lillicrap
- Cast: Ashley Artus, Laura Brattan, Paul Cawley, Victoria Gay, Roger Griffiths, Mike Hayley, Brian Miller, Issy Van Randwyck, Peter Temple
- El Nombre cast: Sophie Aldred, Janet Ellis, Kate Robbins, Steve Steen
- Music: Neil Ben, Mark Blackledge, Andrew Dodge, Richard Durrant, Derek Nash, Sandy Nuttgens
- Graphics: Anne Smith
- Animations: Ealing Animation, Alan Rogers and Peter Lang
- Studio Resource Manager: Steve Lowry
- Camera Supervisor: Gerry Tivers
- Sound Supervisor: Dave Goodwin
- Lighting Director: Dave Gibson
- Vision Mixer: Carol Abbott
- Floor Manager: Tom Hood
- Assistant Floor Managers: Beccy Fawcett, Catharine Hartley
- Costume Designer: Rosie Cheshire
- Make-Up Designer: Judy Gill-Dougherty
- Set Designer: Gina Parr
- Editor: David Austin
- Education Officer: Jenny Towers
- Studio Director: Phil Chilvers
- Executive Producer: Clare Elstow
- Production Team: Clare Arnopp, Debby Black, Debbie Wright
- Producer: Kristin Mason
- © BBC MCMXCIX

== Series 8: Money (Autumn 2000) ==
The eighth series, which is aimed at five- to seven-year-olds, comprised ten episodes focusing on coin recognition, money problems, coin equivalents and change (which the BBC had previously covered in their maths programme, Numbers Plus, in the episode "How Much? How Many?" and in the second series of Megamaths); each episode would open with eight "money-spiders" (one for each coin - 1p, 2p, 5p, 10p, 20p, 50p, £1 and £2) coming down into view from the top of a tree. In this series, the currency of pounds and pence was introduced to Santo Flamingo, which gained a railway station named El Loco and a pizza delivery boy named Leonardo de Sombrero - and the recurring song from the first series, Numbers All Around, was also reworked (to focus on coins instead of numbers). This series also introduced the recurring sketch of Screensaver, which featured a screen named Screen (voiced by Sue Elliott-Nicholls), a variety of customers (who were all played by one-time Spitting Image impressionist Michael Fenton-Stevens), and a robot named T1L (pronounced /tɪl/ ("Till"), and played by Paul Vates).

This series was originally aired on each day of the working week for a fortnight as part of the Schools Programmes strand at 11:05 am.

- Episode 49: Coin Recognition to 10p (23 October 2000)1p

Juan, Mama and Pedro go to the fair (but do not know if they have the right money for the coconut shy, roundabout or candy floss), while Bill is running a cake stall but Bernie cannot decide whether she wants one or not so flips four coins (1p, 2p, 5p and 10p) into the air but they do not come down again, and a cricket player wants to buy some glue from Screensaver to stick his old broken bat back together.

- Episode 50: Money Problems to 10p (24 October 2000)2p

San Flamingo School is holding another jumble sale (this time to raise money for the new school bell), while Bill is now running a drink stall (but after he sells his last drink to Bernie for 8p, he has to close it, and Bernie then disguises herself as a vending machine to trick Bill into giving her money back), and a policeman wants to buy a timepiece from Screensaver (who try to sell him Big Ben for 10p).

- Episode 51: Coin Equivalents to 10p (25 October 2000)5p

Little Juan and his friends are going to Santo Flamingo National Park to see the Giant Cactus, while Bill is now running an "everything" stall (but when Bernie manages to scrape 10p together from a 5p coin, two 2p coins and a 1p coin, she wheels it away after misconstruing the meaning of "everything 10p"), and a sailor wants to buy a cake for his mother from Screensaver (who try to sell him a wedding cake).

- Episode 52: Change from 10p (26 October 2000)10p

Little Juan and his friends have now arrived at Santo Flamingo National Park and seen the Giant Cactus, while Bill and Bernie are hungry so they buy a snack for 5p, a carton of juice for 2p and a bar of chocolate for 3p (from three talking vending machines), and an old man wants to buy a new wheel for his wheel-basket from Screensaver because the old one is broken (and they try to sell him a bicycle wheel).

- Episode 53: Coin Equivalents to 20p (27 October 2000)20p

Juan and Maria notice that Señor Manuel has put up a giant jellybean machine outside Hurrell's store, while Bernie plays "Coin Sports" and loses Bill's 1p, 2p, 5p and 10p coins after they have rolled into a river (making 18p altogether), and a Russian secret agent wishes to change his appearance at Screensaver (who sell him a Hawaiian shirt for 4p, a blond wig for 8p and a striped bow tie for another 8p).

- Episode 54: Change from 20p (30 October 2000)1p – 20p

Mama takes Juan back-to-school shopping at Hurrell's store (and has him try on a hat which is too big for him), while Bernie pays 20p to go on an elephant ride and gets 5p change (but she finds it slow, so pays another 20p to go on a rocket ride and gets another 5p change, then masquerades as a cat ride in order to trick Bill into giving her a third 5p, and after Bill does that and she gives him the ride of his life, he wants to do it again, but she is tired out so she does not), and a chef wants to buy some butter and eggs from Screensaver.

- Episode 55: Coin Equivalents to 50p (31 October 2000)50p

Señor Gelato promises Juan and Juanita an ice-cream if they go to the Santo Flamingo Bank and get him some coins in exchange for the 50p he gave them, while Bill and Bernie try to get out of a car park (but when Bill has scraped 50p together, the barrier catapults him into the air), and a businessman wishes to buy a pet from Screensaver (who try to sell him a "Starpet", from their own home planet, for 50p).

- Episode 56: Change from 50p (1 November 2000)1p – 50p

Miss Bonanza is getting married (and Juan is responsible for the school's collection of 50p with which to buy her a present), while Bill pays 50p to have his photograph taken and gets 20p change (but it takes it before he can go inside the booth, so Bernie pays another 50p to have her photograph taken while Bill counts her change, but when she looks out of the booth to ask why it is taking so long, it takes a photograph of her tail, so they then combine their changes to have their photograph taken together), and a rock star wants to buy some new shoes from Screensaver because his old ones just "aren't his scene" (and they sell him a pair of blue suede platforms for 15p each).

- Episode 57: Coin Equivalents to £1 (2 November 2000)£1

Pedro, Juanita and Maria are sleeping over at Juan's house (and planning to watch a really scary film), while Bill and Bernie are doing their laundry (and have to pay 10p for washing powder in addition to £1 for the washing machine, but when Bernie inserts a £1 coin into the washing powder machine, she gets ten cups, and because she pours them all into the washing machine, it starts spewing foam all over the floor of the launderette) and a cowboy named Tom (nicknamed "Big T") wishes to buy a shirt with a big T on it from Screensaver.

- Episode 58: Up to £2 (3 November 2000)£2

Little Juan is to perform a concert to raise more money for the school bell (with Don Fandango masquerading as Mama and trying to steal all his earnings of £1.60), while Bill and Bernie want to go on a boat trip for £2 (but although Bernie has a £2 coin, they both have to go back home so Bill can scrape it together in other coins, and when they get back to the boat, Bernie gets on it before it pulls out, but Bill is not so lucky because he had to carry all his coins back there in a giant sack), and a non-speaking clown tries to get Screen and T1L (in their last appearance) to guess that he wants to buy a top hat (for 50p) and a rabbit to pull out of it (for £1.50) at Screensaver.

- Writers: Guy Hallifax, Christopher Lillicrap
- Screensaver Cast: Sue Elliott-Nicholls, Michael Fenton-Stevens, Paul Vates
- El Nombre Cast: Sophie Aldred, Janet Ellis, Kate Robbins, Steve Steen
- Bill & Bernie: Laura Brattan, Paul Cawley
- Music: Neil Ben, Mark Blackledge, Stephen Chadwick, Andrew Dodge, Richard Durrant, Derek Nash, Sandy Nuttgens
- Graphic Designer: Clive Harris
- Animations: Ealing Animation, Marcus Parker-Rhodes, Alan Rogers & Peter Lang
- Studio Resources Manager: Geoff Ward
- Camera Supervisor: Gerry Tivers
- Sound Supervisor: Dave Goodwin
- Lighting Director: Mike Le Fevre
- Vision Mixer: Diane Enser
- Floor Manager: Sara Putt
- Assistant Floor Manager: Caroline Broome
- Costume Designer: Rosie Cheshire
- Make-Up Designer: Judy Gill-Dougherty
- Visual Effects: Mike Tucker
- Offline Editor: Graeme Briggs
- Online Editor: David Ackie
- Educational Consultant: Helen Lazenby
- Programme Co-ordinator: Pauline Stone
- Assistant Producer: Claudia Marciante
- Executive Producer: Clare Elstow
- Series Producer: Kristin Mason
- Producer: Julie Ardrey
- © BBC MM

In 2001, by which point VHS was becoming obsolete, this series was released on VHS as a "Video Plus Pack" by BBC Educational Publishing.

== Series 9: Addition and Subtraction (Autumn/Winter 2001) ==
The ninth (and final) series, which is aimed at six- to seven-year-olds, comprised ten episodes focusing on the concepts of adding and subtracting similar to the fourth series (only without Lolita, live-action sketches based on nursery rhymes, or Test the Toad); in this series, Numbertime News, which had appeared in five episodes of the first series with Sammy Sport (played by Andy McEwan, who had played Matt Dillon in Death Without Dishonour, the twenty-sixth episode of Taggart), along with one episode of the fourth series with Rebecca Testament (played by Issy Van Randwyck), became a recurring sketch, with anchorwoman Tara Boomdeay (played by Elisabeth Sladen, who had played Sarah Jane on Doctor Who, as well as several characters in fifteen episodes over the third and aforementioned fourth series) and roving reporter Brad Quiff (played by Ian Connaughton). This series also saw Michael Fenton-Stevens returning to join the El Nombre cast and introduced the character of Addem (voiced by Richard Pearce), a green snake who discovered the series' concept in the company of a yellow ant named Ann (voiced by Moir Leslie) and a whole civilisation of other multi-coloured ants (mostly voiced by both Brian Bowles and Richard Pearce, but the Queen Ant was again voiced by Moir Leslie).

This series was originally screened on Mondays as part of the Schools Programmes strand at 11:05 am, but 1 October 2001 was the first day of that year's four-day Labour Party Conference, so its fourth episode was not shown until the following week.

- Episode 59: Adding Two Numbers (10 September 2001)

Brad Quiff investigates addition (with the "High Peaks Climbing Team"), Bernie challenges Bill by giving him some numbers for him to add onto and make twenty, Addem discovers a civilisation of ants (headed up by Ann), and Little Juan enters a competition on Radio Flamingo.

- Episode 60: Adding Three Numbers (17 September 2001)

Juan and Pedro go shopping when Señor Calculo throws a barbecue, Bernie plants some seeds in window boxes and Bill helps her to add them up, Brad Quiff investigates how many chocolate bars the Malarkey Gang have stolen and Ann has to get twenty-nine ants into three houses.

- Episode 61: Patterns of Addition (24 September 2001)

Addem helps Ann sort out beds for the "adolescants", Little Juan faces off against Don Fandango in the final of the Santo Flamingo Darts Championships, Brad Quiff reports on the popularity of the "Princess Patsy" doll and Bill and Bernie wash their socks at the launderette of the eighth series.

- Episode 62: Two-Step Addition (8 October 2001)

Brad Quiff visits a country fair to meet the makers of buns, El Nombre reads Little Juan a bedtime story (about Don Fandango robbing the Santo Flamingo Bank), Ann needs to prepare twenty-five meals for the "Accounts Department" and Bill and Bernie try to make carrot juice.

- Episode 63: Addition with Partition (15 October 2001)

Ann learns about adding acorns in hundreds, Brad Quiff reports on the opening of the brand-new "Whizzo Lolly Factory", Bill helps Bernie count her pennies as she is planning to "shop 'till she drops", and Juan and Pedro earn pocket money by picking lemons for Señor Manuel.

- Episode 64: Subtracting One from Another (5 November 2001)

Brad Quiff reports on an American football team passing the ball back down a numberline, Bernie challenges Bill again by giving him some more numbers (this time to subtract from them and leave ten), a pair of cowboy ants have to take twenty-seven aphids to the milking shed and Juan is going on holiday to Costa Fortuna with Mama, Pedro, Juanita and Maria after winning the competition from the first episode.

- Episode 65: Patterns of Subtraction (12 November 2001)

The Queen Ant decides to hold a regatta, Juan and his party get on the plane to Costa Fortuna, Bill washes some more of his socks at the launderette but Bernie tells him that he needs to separate the whites from the coloureds, and Brad Quiff reports on how crowds have been gathering for Punch and Judy performances all day; for this episode's adaptation of the story (which was also frequently adapted by camp entertainer Mr. Partridge on the BBC's own Hi-de-Hi!), Mr. Punch steals Judy's marbles from her box while she is asleep.

- Episode 66: Addition and Subtraction Difference (19 November 2001)

Brad Quiff reports on an annual tug-of-war contest between the Diddletown Dodgers and the Softville Saints, Ann needs eighty-two candles for the Queen Ant's birthday cake, Juan and his party arrive at the Sea View Hotel in Costa Fortuna (where they meet their guide, Pablo) and Bill and Bernie insert two 20p coins into two of the three talking vending machines of the eighth series, to buy a snack for 16p and a carton of juice for 14p (receiving 4p and 6p change); they then combine their changes to buy a bar of chocolate for 10p from the third talking vending machine. This is also one of only two episodes to have an El Nombre sketch that is not set in Santo Flamingo at all.

- Episode 67: Two-Step Subtraction (26 November 2001)

Juan and Pedro go to the fair in Costa Fortuna (where their guide, Pablo, fronts a ring-toss game), Ann has to fill forty-five places in the "Accountants"' new building, Bill is running an apple stall (but when Bernie wants to buy three, he finds out he has not got any, so they both pick some off an apple tree) and Brad Quiff reports on "Doreen's Sweet Shop" getting robbed of a large pile of chocolate eggs.

- Episode 68: Plus and Minus (3 December 2001)

In the show's last episode, a squad of 100 marching ants keeps breaking up and coming back together, Juan and his party are on the plane back to Santo Flamingo (and when they get back to its airport, they are told that they can only bring back a certain amount of things at customs), Brad Quiff reports on the "Numbertime News Live Formation Climbing Team" (who show the viewers a trick to remember their sums) and Bill and Bernie have a cup of tea (but Bill puts ten cubes of sugar in his, and when Bernie asks him what he is doing, she makes him forget how many he has put in there); even though this was the last episode, El Nombre got a second series of his spin-off show in 2003.

- Writers: Andrew Bernhardt, Guy Hallifax, Christopher Lillicrap
- Cast (Numbertime News): Ian Connaughton, Elisabeth Sladen
- Cast (El Nombre): Sophie Aldred, Janet Ellis, Michael Fenton-Stevens, Kate Robbins, Steve Steen
- Cast (Addem and the Ants): Brian Bowles, Moir Leslie, Richard Pearce
- Music: Mark Blackledge, Archie Brown, Charles Casey & Simeon Jones, Andrew Dodge, Derek Nash, Sandy Nuttgens & Neil Ben
- Graphic Design: Sue Hattam
- Animations: Jon Aird, Ealing Animation, Phew!, Alan Rogers & Peter Lang, Ian Sachs
- Location Camera: Chris Sutcliffe, Gavin Richards
- Location Sound: Tony Cogger
- Sound Supervisor: Dave Goodwin
- Assistant Floor Manager: Tracy Jane Read
- Costume Designer: Rosie Cheshire
- Make-Up Designer: Judy Gill-Dougherty
- Set Design: Gina Parr
- Editor: Jon Bignold
- Education Consultant: Barbara Allebone
- Programme Co-ordinator: Clare Arnopp
- Director: Andrea Parr
- Executive Producer: Sue Nott
- Producer: Kristin Mason
- © BBC MMI

In 2002, by which time VHS was even more obsolete, this series was released on VHS as a "Video Plus Pack" by BBC Educational Publishing.

== Radio series ==
The first series was accompanied by a ten-part radio series on BBC School Radio entitled Radio Numbertime, which again focused on the numbers 1-10, in order; it ran from 21 September to 30 November 1993. Another radio series, which was entitled simply Numbertime like the television series, was broadcast on BBC School Radio from 29 September 2000 to 26 March 2003 - and a third radio series, which was again entitled Numbertime like the defunct television series, was broadcast on BBC School Radio from 1 May to 26 June 2014.
