= Meees =

Welsh-language children's television show from Wales

Meees (Welsh for Baaas, as in the sound of bleating sheep) is a Welsh-language children's television show from Wales. It is about a family of multicultural opera-singing sheep, played by performers in sheep costumes. It is shown on S4C, the Welsh equivalent of Channel 4. 52 episodes over two series of the 15-minute show have been made.

== Characters ==
The family run their own recycling plant from their home at Acropolis Cottage, and are headed by Costaaas, a male sheep from Greece, who is married to Baaalwen, a black Welsh ewe, (played by Tamsin Heatley) whom he supposedly met in a Milanese choir. The couple live with their daughter Meeegan, her husband Meeelvyn, and their twins called Jaaason and Meeedea (named after the Greek mythological figures Jason and Medea, who also feature in opera). The characters in the series all have names which include an "eee" or "aaa", to reflect the sounds made by sheep. The fifteenth episode features the appearance of Aurora, Baaalwen's older sister, who has her nephew called Oscar, who never married an ewe or had children. Baaalwen and Costaaas live with Meeegan's older sister Alice, her husband Louis, and their three children called Terrence, Carol and David.

== Show history ==
The show was first broadcast in 2005, and later in that year went on to win a Bafta Cymru for the Best New Media TV or Film Related.

In April 2006 the rights to air the show were purchased by Al Jazeera, the Qatari news network, after Sheikha Mozah, the wife of the Emir of Qatar and channel founder supposedly "fell in love with" them. In Arabic it is known as 'آل ماااع'

An English-language version of the show is now in the planning stages, in part written by former The Housemartins guitarist Stan Cullimore.

On 17 April 2007, the show was also broadcast on Discovery Kids Latin America. In the Latin American Dubs, Costaaas (Andrés in Latin America) is voiced by Andrés Bustamante, Baaalwen (Angélica in Latin America) is voiced by María Santander, Meeeegan (Sofía in Latin America) is voiced by Liliana Barba, Meeelvyn (César in Latin America) is voiced by Humberto Vélez, Jaaason (Luis in Latin America) is voiced by Irving Corona, and Meeedea (Teresita in Latin America) is voiced by Verania Ortiz. The fifteenth episode features Rocío Garcel as the voice of Baaalwen's older sister Aurora, Gael García Bernal as the voice of Costaaas and Baaalwen's youngest son Oscar, Laura Torres as the voice of Meeegan's older sister Alice (Alicia in Latin America), Xavier Lopez "Chabelo" as the voice of Meeegan's brother-in-law Louis (Luis in Latin America), Diego Ángeles as the voice of Terrence (Javier in Latin America), Verania Ortiz (Meeedea's Latin American dubber) as the voice of Carol (María in Latin America) and Ángel García as the voice of David.

== Staff ==
- Director: Helen Sheppard
  Sian Reid
  John Walker
  Cliff Jones
- Music: Paddy Kingsland
- All Character designs, Set & Costume design: Sally Preisig
- Voices: Tamsin Heatley
  Wayne Forester
  Joanna Ruiz
  Ian Sexon (season 2)
  Nick Mercer
- Voices (Welsh): Huw Ceredig
  Sharon Morgan
  Clare Hingott
  Olwen Rees
  Liÿr Ifans
  Rhys Parry Jones
  Saran Morgan
  Gwynfor Dafydd
- Costume Characters: Jenny Hutchinson
  Sian Reid
  Colin Purves
  Samamtha Dodd
  Holli Hoffman
  Garath Jones
- Producer: Nia Ceidiog, of Cynhyrchiadau Ceidiog Creations

== See also ==
- Fireman Sam
- Sali Mali
