= Jenny Hutchinson =

British actress

- Born: 28 September 1974 (age 51); London, England
- Occupation: Actress
- Known for: Tweenies

Jenny Hutchinson (born 28 September 1974 in London, United Kingdom) is a British actress who played the original Fizz in the children's show Tweenies. Among her other roles, she has played Meeedea in The Baaas, the joker in Series 1 of Megamaths and Florrie in Fimbles. In addition to acting, she also operates the Second Skin Agency which represents puppeteers, actors/actresses and voicers.
