= Huw Ceredig =

Welsh actor (1942–2011)

- Born: Huw Ceredig Jones; 22 June 1942; Brynamman, Carmarthenshire, Wales
- Died: 16 August 2011 (aged 69); Cwmrhydyceirw, Swansea, Wales
- Occupation: Actor
- Known for: Reg Harries in Pobol y Cwm

Huw Ceredig Jones (22 June 1942 – 16 August 2011) was a Welsh actor, best known for portraying Reg Harries in the Welsh-language soap opera Pobol y Cwm for 29 years, from 1974 to 2003.

== Early life ==
Huw Ceredig was born in Brynamman, Carmarthenshire, in 1942, the son of Reverend Gerallt Jones, and Elizabeth J. Griffiths, a Welsh teacher. Ceredig was educated at Llandovery College, where one of his teachers was the Welsh rugby player and coach Carwyn James, before going on to train as a teacher at Trinity College in Carmarthen. He was a member of the renowned Cilie family of poets, and was raised in Llanuwchllyn. Ceredig was the brother of Welsh politician Alun Ffred Jones, folk singer/politician Dafydd Iwan, and Arthur Morus.

Ceredig re-mortgaged his house to purchase instruments for the new Welsh band Edward H. Dafis and introduced them to the stage for the first time at the Welsh National Eisteddfod in Ruthin in 1973.

== Career ==
In Ceredig's early days, he won a scholarship to Llandovery College, where one of his teachers was the Welsh rugby player and coach Carwyn James, before going on to train as a teacher at the Trinity University College. There his interest in drama was fuelled by the celebrated Welsh drama lecturer Norah Isaac, and while teaching in two schools at Maesteg, near Bridgend, he began acting as an amateur in his spare time, using the stage name Huw Ceredig.

After being spotted in productions at the Swansea Welsh language theatre, Ceredig was offered small parts on Welsh television. He was teaching at his local primary school in Laleston, near Bridgend, when, in his early 30s, he decided to become a professional actor. He joined the cast of Pobol y Cwm at the outset, and remained a popular fixture in the show for almost 30 years. When he was written out in 2003 – Reg Harries was killed off – Ceredig was aggrieved that he had not been allowed to stay for another year to complete three full decades in the part. Between 1987 and 1993, his on-screen son, Gareth Wyn Harries, was played by the young actor Ioan Gruffudd.

Ceredig played the father of Rhys Ifans and Llŷr Ifans, "Fatty Lewis", in the film Twin Town. He also provided Welsh-language voices for Superted and Meees, about a family of multicultural operatic sheep ("meees" being the Welsh for "baaas", the noise that sheep make).

Ceredig's film credits include the 1992 comedy Rebecca's Daughters and the Dylan Thomas biopic The Edge of Love (2008). He was also seen in other television roles in Emmerdale, Heartbeat and Z-Cars.

== Personal life ==
Ceredig, who became a household name in Wales, was a gregarious man with a remarkable gift for forging firm friendships. A fan of sport, his overriding passion was for rugby, and for a time he served as chairman of Bridgend Rugby Club. He was also a devotee of The Turf, and at one period was the part-owner of a racehorse.

Ceredig was married to Margaret, and they had two daughters. He died following a long term illness at Morriston Hospital in Cwmrhydyceirw, Swansea, on 16 August 2011 at the age of 69. Ioan Gruffudd, who played the son of Ceredig's character on Pobol y Cwm for years, was one of those who paid tribute.

== Filmography ==
=== Film ===
- The Mouse and the Woman (1980) - Sergeant
- Giro City (1982) - Elwyn Davies
- Rebecca's Daughters (1992, cyfres) - Mordecai Thomas
- Twin Town (1997) - Fatty Lewis
- The Edge of Love (2008) - John Patrick (final film role)

=== Television ===
- Pobol y Cwm (1974–2003, opera sebon) - Reg Harries
- Z-Cars (1977, cyfres) - Det. Con. Probert
- The Life and Times of David Lloyd George (1981, cyfres) - D.A. Thomas
- Ennal's Point (1982, cyfres) - Len Dunce
- The District Nurse (1984, cyfres) - Rowlands
- I Fro Breuddwydion (1987, ffilm teledu) - Ffermwr
- We Are Seven (1989–1991) - Jim Powell
- Rebecca's Töchter (1992) - Mordecai Thomas
- Yr Heliwr (1997, cyfres) - Peter Webb
- Emmerdale (2003, opera sebon) - George Gibbons
- Heartbeat (2005, cyfres) - Cyril Williams
- Doctors (2005, cyfres) - Kenneth Gough
- Cowbois ac Injans (2006–2007, cyfres) - Bry
- Y Pris (2007, cyfres) - Rhidian Edwards
- Hawkmoor
- Enoc Huws

=== Voice ===
- SuperTed
- Meees

== Bibliography ==
- Huw Ceredig and Aled Islwyn (November 2006). Cofio Pwy Ydw I: Huw Ceredig. Cardiff: Dref Wen. ISBN 978-1-85596-739-7.
