= Christopher Lillicrap =

British TV presenter, writer, singer, and composer

Christopher J. Lillicrap (born 14 February 1949 in Plymouth, Devon) is a British television presenter, writer, and composer.

== Career ==
Lillicrap began his career as a secondary school teacher in Mansfield, but later transitioned into repertory theatre where he worked alongside Zoë Wanamaker, Jonathan Pryce and Richard Eyre. In 1976, he auditioned to become a presenter on the children's programme Playschool, but his style was considered overly theatrical. A BBC producer who saw his performance informed him of a new programme in development, Playboard, and invited him to present and compose original songs for the production. Storyboard launched a substantial career for Lillicrap in children's television, earning numerous writing credits in various shows including Rainbow, Fab Lab, and Fimbles, We'll Tell You a Story, and Flicks. Lillicrap is also the creator of the educational television series Numbertime, which spawned the spinoff El Nombre.

Lillicrap has co-written numerous pantomimes and children's shows for the theatre with his actress wife Jeanette Ranger. Their musical Monty Moonbeam's Magnificent Mission won the TMA/Martini Award for Best Show for Young People. He no longer performs in pantomime following his wife's stroke.

== Personal life ==
Lillicrap lived for many years in Farnborough, Hampshire before moving to the Greek island of Symi, where he wrote his first novel, Midas, under the pseudonym Dominic Ranger, published by Matador in 2013.

Lillicrap released the album What Ever Happened To? in October 2025.
