= Sue Nott =

American mountain climber and ice climber

Susan Nott (June 12, 1969 – c. May 20, 2006) was an American mountain climber and ice climber. In May 2006, she and her climbing partner (Karen McNeill) disappeared on Mount Foraker in Alaska, and neither body has ever been recovered.

== Climbing career ==
Nott began climbing in 1989 in her hometown of Vail, Colorado. Early on, she dedicated her attention to ice climbing and led a climb on a free-hanging icicle called "the Fang" within her first year of climbing. Throughout the 1990s, Nott focused her efforts on a number of technical ice climbs, particularly in the Canadian Rockies, such as "Acid Howl" on Mount Stanley, British Columbia; "the Replicant" on Mount Rundle, Alberta; and the first ascent of the "Glass Onion", a difficult rock and ice route in southwestern Alaska. She later traveled to Patagonia to climb Fitz Roy, and to the French Alps.

Nott met New Zealand climber Karen McNeill at an American ice-climbing competition. In 1998, Nott and McNeill paired up for an expedition to Peru to climb Taulliraju; in 2001, they climbed Shivling together in India's Garhwal Himalaya. Nott climbed the Eiger in 2003 with her boyfriend John Varco, and became the first American woman to complete a winter ascent of the mountain's north face. The same year, she and Varco made an unsuccessful attempt to claim the first ascent of the North Spur of Kalanka in Nanda Devi National Park, India. In 2005, Nott and McNeill reached the summit of Denali in Alaska via the Cassin Ridge.

=== Death ===
In May 2006, Nott and McNeill returned to the Alaska Range to climb Mount Foraker via the Infinite Spur route, planning to be the first women to do so. They left the mountain's base camp on May 12 with a 14-day supply of food and fuel. When they had not returned or been seen by June 1, the National Park Service (NPS) launched an aerial search for the women; the search was called off on June 11, having only found the climbers' lost gear, avalanche debris, and tracks near the summit.

A report issued by the NPS in 2007 summarized the evidence found in the search and investigation, and speculated about how the climbers perished. The report concluded that neither Nott nor McNeill fell when their gear was dropped at around 11,500 feet (3,500 m), and surmised that the women continued to climb as high as 16,600 feet (5,100 m) before building a snow cave, where they ultimately died.

== Legacy ==
Following the deaths of Nott and McNeill, the American Alpine Club and Mountain Hardwear, Nott's sponsor, established the McNeill-Nott Award in 2007. The award is a US$5,000 grant which is given annually to "amateur climbers exploring new routes or unclimbed peaks with small and lightweight teams".

== See also ==
- Catherine Destivelle, leading female mountaineer of the 1980s to 1990s
