= El Nombre =

Television series

- Genre: Educational animation
- Created by: Christopher Lillicrap
- Developed by: Geoff Walker
- Written by: Christopher Lillicrap
- Directed by: Chris Mendham; Geoff Walker
- Starring: Steve Steen; Sophie Aldred; Kate Robbins; Janet Ellis
- Composers: Christopher Lillicrap; Steve Marshall
- Country of origin: United Kingdom
- Original language: English
- No. of series: 2
- No. of episodes: 26

Production
- Executive producer: Theresa Plummer-Andrews
- Producers: Jilly Joseph; Richard Randolph
- Running time: 5 minutes

Original release
- Network: BBC One (Series 1); CBeebies (Series 2)
- Release: 5 January 2001 – 29 November 2003

El Nombre is a children's educational programme about an anthropomorphic Mexican gerbil character, originally from a series of educational sketches on Numbertime, the BBC schools programme about mathematics. He was also the only character to appear in all Numbertime episodes. His voice was provided by Steve Steen, while the other characters' voices were provided by Sophie Aldred, Kate Robbins, and (from 1999) former Blue Peter host Janet Ellis. For the ninth (and final) series of Numbertime in 2001, Michael Fenton-Stevens also provided voices of certain other characters in the El Nombre sketches.

The character's name means "The Name" in Spanish, not "The Number", which would be "El Número", but El Nombre does mean "The Number" in Catalan.

== Setting ==
El Nombre is set in the fictional town of Santa Flamingo (originally known as Santo Flamingo), home of Little Juan, his Mama, Pedro Gonzales, Juanita Conchita, Maria Consuela Tequila Chiquita, Little Pepita Consuela Tequila Chiquita, Tanto the tarantula, Señor Gelato the ice-cream seller, Leonardo de Sombrero the pizza delivery boy, Señor Calculo the bank manager, Señor Manuel the greengrocer, Miss Constanza Bonanza the school teacher, Señora Fedora the balloon seller and mayor, Señor Loco the steam engine driver, Señor Chipito the carpenter and the local bandit Don Fandango (although it was not actually given a name until the fifth series of Numbertime premiered in January 1998); whenever he was needed, El Nombre swung into action to solve the townspeople's simple mathematical problems, usually talking in rhyme. His character was a parody of the fictional hero Zorro, wearing a similar black cowl mask and huge sombrero, appearing unexpectedly to save the townsfolk from injustice, and generally swinging around on his bullwhip – however, unlike Zorro, he was often quite inept (in fact, on one occasion, Tanto tipped a bucket of water onto him after he made him reenact the Incy Wincy Spider rhyme).

When El Nombre first appeared on Numbertime in 1993, his purpose was merely to write numbers in the desert sand and demonstrate the correct ways to form them as his four-piece mariachi band played The Mexican Hat Dance (and said "Again!" once he had finished, as it gave them an excuse to play again); this was shot from an angle directly overhead leaving El Nombre almost completely eclipsed by his large sombrero. His appeal was instant and his success prompted rapid development of his role in the series (as from the second series in 1995, he was given two sketches per episode) – and since his basic beginning, El Nombre went on to appear in a total of 79 (89, if counting those from the "revised" version of the first series) sketches on Numbertime before gaining a series of his own, acquiring dramatic storylines and a full cast of characters, while continuing to demonstrate mathematical concepts, albeit in a dramatic and entertaining way. The stories moved away from solving simple mathematical equations to fighting petty crime, unrelated to the number-solving which made his name and for which he was created.

As well as being popular with schoolchildren, El Nombre also developed a cult following amongst students and parents, because of the many references to classic spaghetti Westerns; indeed, his popularity grew so much that in March 2004, the BBC released a 3-minute El Nombre theme song as a single.

== Characters ==
- El Nombre: The eponymous main character of the Numbertime sketches, and the spin-off series they began, El Nombre started his life as an adaptation of Words and Pictures' Magic Pencil (in the sense of showing the viewer how to write numbers as opposed to letters); after showing Juan how to draw from one to ten, he went on to show him how to identify (and draw) shapes, as well as teach him about instances of space and position, addition and subtraction, time and money in his everyday life.
- Little Juan: A young gerbil whose name was a pun on "little one", Juan started his life being upset about not being able to write numbers and cried until El Nombre arrived to show him how to do it; after learning to draw from one to ten, he could not identify shapes and was despondent about it until El Nombre arrived (first to show him instances of the shapes around the town and second to draw them). He and his friends then got themselves into various dilemmas in their everyday lives, which El Nombre was called on to help them out of.
- Mama: Little Juan's mother, who usually could not assist Juan with his various mathematical dilemmas until El Nombre had arrived.
- Pedro Gonzales & Juanita Conchita: Two of Juan's friends, who first appeared in the second series of Numbertime, but were not named until the third; on one occasion in the third series, Pedro professed to be "the greatest goalkeeper in the world" when Juan could not score past him, and on one occasion in the fourth series, Juan accidentally blew up Juanita's balloon ten times causing it to burst.
- Señor Chipito: The town carpenter who first appeared in the second series of Numbertime as the owner of The Maggot and Cactus Saloon, but was not named and given his present occupation until the sixth; on one occasion in that series, Juan and Pedro had to take a wheel from Señor Gelato's ice-cream tricycle to him for repairs, as it struck a three-legged table that they were already taking to him.
- Señor Manuel: The town greengrocer, who first appeared in the second series of Numbertime but was not named until the fourth; the store he ran was called "Hurrell's" (which was an inside reference to the BBC's then-current education officer in 1995, Su Hurrell).
- Tanto: Little Juan's pet tarantula spider, who was introduced in the third series of Numbertime; he communicated by mumbling, and on one occasion in the fifth series, Pedro bet Juan he could find a spider who was faster than him (the one he found was mechanical, reflected by the key for winding on its back) and challenged him to a race around the then-newly named town against it, which Tanto won.
- Maria Consuela Tequila Chiquita: Another of Juan's friends, who was introduced in the third series of Numbertime, and did not appear in as many sketches as Pedro or Juanita; in the seventh series, her younger sister (named Pepita) started at San Flamingo School.
- Señora Fedora: The town balloon seller, who was introduced at the end of the fourth series of Numbertime, but was later shown to be its mayor as well in the seventh one after she opened its fifteenth annual Egg Festival and chose Mama to make its giant omelette.
- Miss Constanza Bonanza: The teacher for San Flamingo School, who was introduced in the fifth series of Numbertime (as was the school itself); in the eighth series she got married and Juan was responsible for the school collection with which to buy her a present.
- Delietta Smith: A television cook who was introduced in the fifth series of Numbertime; known as The Great Delietta and a spoof of Delia Smith, Mama once tried to make her omelette with red and green peppers (but could not, so El Nombre had to help her).
- Señor Gelato: The town ice-cream seller, who was introduced in the sixth series of Numbertime; on one occasion in that series he swerved on his tricycle to avoid striking Juan and Pedro (who were playing football), and crashed into Señor Manuel's tomato display.
- Señor Calculo & Don Fandango: The town bank manager and bandit, who were introduced in the sixth series of Numbertime; on one occasion in that series, Don Fandango stole twenty gold coins from the bank (but Tanto bit a hole in his bag, causing them to fall out).
- Pepita Consuela Tequila Chiquita: Maria's younger sister who started San Flamingo School in the seventh series of Numbertime.
- Leonardo de Sombrero: The town pizza delivery boy, who was introduced in the eighth series of Numbertime; his name is a spoof on that of Leonardo da Vinci, and once, he delivered a pizza to Juan and his friends when they were having a horror movie sleepover.
- Señor Loco: The town's steam engine driver, who was introduced in the eighth series of Numbertime; his name is a reference to the fact "loco" is short for locomotive, and once, he took Juan's class to the Santo Flamingo National Park to see the Giant Cactus.
- Señor Singalotti: A famous opera singer (who only appeared in the fourteenth episode of the spin-off series, "Going for a Song").
- El Presidente: The president (who visited the town in the twenty-fifth episode of the spin-off series, "A Very Important Visit").

A gerbil named Pablo also appeared in the ninth series of Numbertime after Juan entered a competition on Radio Flamingo to win a holiday to the seaside resort of Costa Fortuna and won; Juan, Mama, Pedro, Juanita and Maria met him when they arrived at the resort's hotel (because he was their guide to it), and he went on to front a ring-toss stall when they visited its fairground the following week.

== Episode list ==
Although none of the El Nombre sketches on Numbertime ever had a specific title, those of the first series were introduced by an announcer as "Episodes 1-10" (and they were slightly lengthened for the "revised" edition of that series, in September 1998; the third line of the opening song and his farewell catchphrase were also changed several times, to reflect the series' focus). All twenty-six episodes of the spin-off El Nombre series (thirteen in 2001 and a further thirteen in 2003), however, were titled – and their names are listed here.

=== Series 1 (2001) ===
The first six episodes of the first series were aired on BBC One as double bills in the CBBC strand on Fridays at 3:45 pm, while the next seven were aired individually on Wednesdays in the same timeslot; three episodes were later repeated on BBC Two as part of the CBBC Breakfast Show on 1 June, 19 July and 20 July 2001, but neither they, or the other ten episodes of the series, were repeated after that.

Episode number	Episode name	Air date
1	Where's That Spider?	5 January 2001
2	Free as a Bird	5 January 2001
3	Sports Day	12 January 2001
4	All the Fun of the Fair	12 January 2001
5	The Phantom Tanto	19 January 2001
6	The Missing Birthday Cake	19 January 2001
7	The Great Train Robbery	24 January 2001
8	The Giant Cactus	31 January 2001
9	The Great Custard Pie Fight	14 February 2001
10	The Great Escape	7 March 2001
11	When the Balloon Goes Up	14 March 2001
12	The Ghost of Santa Flamingo	21 March 2001
13	Match of the Day	28 March 2001

=== Series 2 (2003) ===
The second series was aired as double bills with in vision sign language on the CBeebies Channel on Saturdays and Sundays at 3:30 pm; after the last episode aired on 29 November, the first one was immediately repeated again, and the series concluded its second consecutive run in the same timeslot on 4 January 2004. All thirteen episodes were later repeated without signing on BBC Two in the CBeebies strand on Wednesdays from 7 January to 31 March 2004.

Episode number	Episode name	Air date
14	Going for a Song	8 November 2003
15	Runaway Train	8 November 2003
16	The Tent	9 November 2003
17	Stuck at the Top	9 November 2003
18	The Great Bank Robbery	15 November 2003
19	The Great Sand Race	15 November 2003
20	The Lemon Tree	16 November 2003
21	Beside the Sea	16 November 2003
22	The Last Dance	22 November 2003
23	Saved by the Whale	22 November 2003
24	Up, Up and Away	23 November 2003
25	A Very Important Visit	23 November 2003
26	Winter Wonderland	29 November 2003

== DVD release ==
In October 2005, all twenty-six episodes were released on DVD by Maverick Entertainment; the first ten were previously released on a VHS entitled El Nombre to the Rescue by BBC Worldwide in 2001, which also featured an exclusive short (entitled Learn Your Numbers With Little Juan, and edited together from the El Nombre sketches of the "original" first series of Numbertime). Some of the El Nombre (and cell-animated) sketches of the "revised" first, second and fifth, and fourth series of Numbertime were also released by BBC Active in 2009 on three DVDs entitled Fun with Numbers – which all came with accompanying books featuring the characters, and were subtitled Counting 1 to 10, Shapes and Time (the featured sketches were mostly from the second series), and Adding and Taking Away respectively.

== Credits ==
- Written by: Christopher Lillicrap
- Original designs: Ealing Animation
- Voices by Steven Steen, Kate Robbins, Sophie Aldred and Janet Ellis
- Models: Fin Leadbitter, Humphrey Leadbitter and Katy Maxwell
- Props by Graeme Owen, Fin Leadbitter, Sophie Brown and Katy Maxwell
- Sets by Graeme Owen, Colin Armitage, Sophie Brown and Humphrey Leadbitter
- Animation by Humphrey Leadbitter, Tim Allen, Chris Mendham and Dan Sharp
- Editing and Special Effects by David Brylewski
- Facilities by Oasis Television
- Theme Tune Composer by Christopher Lillicrap
- Music and Effects by Steve Marshall
- Sound by Adrian Sear
- Executive Producer: Theresa Plummer-Andrews
- Produced by Jilly Joseph and Richard Randolph
- Directed by Geoff Walker
