= 5 (British TV channel) programming =

Channel 5 airs a wide variety of programming that covers various genres and themes, with programmes about farming, trains and royalty being popular.

The channel is notable for its travel and holiday shows, whether presented by comedians such as Susan Calman and Alexander Armstrong or whether they are programmes in a fly-on-the-wall reality format like Allo Allo! Brits in France or the Bargain Loving Brits... series. The channel has also become associated with a number of people and programmes from Yorkshire with shows including Jane McDonald, The Yorkshire Vet's Julian Norton and shepherdess Amanda Owen, (the latter two also contributing to episodes of This Week on the Farm, filmed at Cannon Hall Farm in South Yorkshire).

Channel 5 is also notable for securing the rights to Home and Away in 2001, which helped boost early evening viewing figures for the channel, and acquiring Neighbours from the BBC after a bidding war with other broadcasters. However, where once imported drama made up a large part of its schedule, Channel 5 has increased the number of titles released under the banner of Channel 5 Original Dramas, with The Drowning and a new version of All Creatures Great and Small bringing in more than 4 million viewers to the channel, making it one of Channel 5's biggest hits of Autumn 2021 along with Our Yorkshire Farm and The Madame Blanc Mysteries (all with audiences of over 2.5 million viewers).

== Public service ==
Channel 5, as a British public service broadcaster, are required to broadcast a wide variety of programming. As opposed to Channel 4, whose programming remit targets the fringes of society and ranges a variety of cultures, Channel 5's remit is more like ITV's. The Channel's remit is laid out in the Communications Act 2003, Section 265 and is regulated by Ofcom. The section states that:

(1)The regulatory regime for every licensed public service channel, and for the public teletext service, includes a condition requiring the provider of the channel or service to fulfil the public service remit for that channel or service.

(2)The public service remit— (a) for every Channel 3 service, and (b) for Channel 5, is the provision of a range of high quality and diverse programming

As a public service broadcaster, Channel 5 is required to show a quota of news bulletins and educational programmes. Documentaries such as Hidden Lives, Revealed and Extraordinary People are examples of how the channel has met these criteria. In 2005, Channel 5 acquired the right to the annual Royal Institution Christmas Lectures, with the broadcasts occurring on the channel for three years (as they are now on BBC Four). The channel has also featured some short educational documentary series such as Your Sport focusing on sport in local communities.

== Early scheduling ==
Upon launch, Channel 5's programming followed a strict schedule with the intention that viewers could tune in and always know what to expect. Major features of Channel 5's early scheduling structure included daily soap opera Family Affairs at 6.30pm, a nightly news broadcast at 8.30pm, presented by Kirsty Young. That was followed by a film at 9pm every night and The Jack Docherty Show, a comedy chat show. Daytime programmes included Sunset Beach, the American soap opera, Leeza Gibbons' chat show, Leeza and 5 News Early. Weekend programming included Night Fever, a panel show presented by Suggs and the fantasy series Xena: Warrior Princess and Hercules: The Legendary Journeys.

=== Channel 5's 10th anniversary programming ===
For its 10th birthday on Friday 30 March 2007, the channel (then typeset as Channel 5) scheduled a few special programmes which resulted in the channel achieving its lowest viewing figures on a Friday for nearly 10 years and, for any day, its lowest peak time share performance since 2002.

The birthday schedule started with the 7.30pm programme Gordon Brown Meets the 10-Year-Olds which got 200,000 viewers watching Channel 5, the channel's lowest amount of viewers for that timeslot in two years. Gordon Brown Meets the 10-Year-Olds was followed by The 10 Demandments at 8pm and I Blame the Spice Girls: The Monster Quiz of the Decade an hour later. The latter show, produced by Zeppotron was a comedy quiz presented by Liza Tarbuck, and featuring contestants Trisha Goddard, Johnny Vegas, Ben Miller and Frankie Boyle, which took its name from the fact that the Spice Girls had been the first act to be seen launching the service in 1997. Questions were based on stories from the news between the period 1997 - 2007, as well as shows that had been broadcast on the channel. Unlike Channel 4's The Big Fat Quiz of the Year, which has had numerous editions since December 2004, I Blame the Spice Girls remains a one-off, as only 600,000 viewers tuned in to see the 1 hour 30 minute 9pm quiz.

The channels best ratings for its birthday night of programming was for The Most Shocking Celebrity Moments of the Decade at 10.30pm, a programme which attracted 900,000 viewers from 10.30pm on 30 March 2007, and a format which would be still commissioned by the channel (under various Most Shocking names) 15 years later.

== Children and teenagers ==
Channel 5's pre-school programming block Milkshake! is shown from 6 am to 9:15 am each day. The block has a number of presenters and features a range of pre-school programming, including Fifi and the Flowertots, Peppa Pig and Hi-5. Until October 2007, the channel also had a block called Shake! at weekends, which was aimed at an older audience. However, Channel 5 then removed the Shake! block from its schedules, as Neighbours was taking up the Sunday slot. Shake! made a return to the channel on 4 October 2009 every Sunday morning after agreeing a deal with Disney. The block features Hannah Montana, Wizards of Waverly Place and Snobs. It also saw the return of Channel 5's hit show The Tribe, a futuristic New Zealand teenage drama series which was shown in its entirety from 1999 to 2003.

=== Current programmes ===
- The Adventures of Paddington
- Aneeshwar's Outdoor Adventures
- Animal Care Club
- Ben and Holly's Little Kingdom
- Brave Bunnies
- Circle Square
- Cooking with The Gills
- The Creature Cases
- Daisy and Ollie
- Floogals
- Go Green With The Grimwades
- Jen's Jolly Bakes
- Kangaroo Beach
- Kid-E-Cats
- Let's Go Treasure Seeking
- Little Princess
- Magic of Science
- Meet the Experts
- Meet the Hedgehogs
- Milkshake! Badgers Their Secret World
- Milkshake! Bop Box Boogie (2020–2021)
- Milkshake! Craft Party
- Milkshake! Croc Watch
- Milkshake! Deep Sea Detectives
- Milkshake! Exploring Senses
- Milkshake! Forest School
- Milkshake! Grow Your Own
- Milkshake! Let's Play
- Milkshake! Little Helpers
- Milkshake! Love Nature
- Milkshake! Make a Change
- Milkshake! Monkey
- Milkshake! Movers
- Milkshake! Music Explorers
- Milkshake! News
- Milkshake! Off We Go
- Milkshake! Secrets of The Forest
- Milkshake! Space Explorers
- Milkshake! Story Den
- Milkshake! Summer Fun
- Milkshake! Tales From The Zoo
- Milkshake! Vaisakhi
- Milkshake! Wesak
- Milkshake! World Oceans Day
- Milkshake! World of Dance
- Mimi's World
- MixMups
- Mofy
- Move It, Milkshakers!
- Mya Go
- Odo
- Oggy Oggy
- Peppa Pig
- Pip and Posy
- Pirata and Capitano
- Pop Paper City
- Reu and Harper's Wonder World
- Roarsome Dinosaurs
- The Secret Life of Kittens
- Shane the Chef
- Show Me How
- Stan and Gran
- Sunny Bunnies
- Tim Rex in Space
- Treehouse
- Tweedy & Fluff
- The Wonderful World of Baby Animals
- The Woohoos!
- The World According to Grandpa

==== Programming from Nickelodeon (U.S.) ====
- Baby Shark's Big Show!
- Blue's Clues and You! (2020–2024)
- Dora
- The Patrick Star Show (2025–present) (Not part of Milkshake!)
- Paw Patrol
- Rubble and Crew
- Santiago of the Seas
- SpongeBob SquarePants (2015; 2019–present) (Not part of Milkshake!)

==== Other acquired programming ====
- Bob the Builder (2015–2021) (now on ITVX)
- Chip and Potato
- Fireman Sam
- Mecha Builders
- Milo
- Noddy, Toyland Detective
- Ricky Zoom
- The Smurfs
- Thomas & Friends
- Thomas & Friends: All Engines Go

=== Former programmes ===
- The Adventures of Sinbad
- The Adventures of the Bush Patrol
- Angels of Jarm (2007–2017)
- Anytime Tales
- Atlantis High
- Audrey and Friends (2000–2002)
- Aussie Antics
- Bamboo Bears
- Batman: The Brave and the Bold
- Beachcomber Bay
- The Beeps (2007–2015)
- The Beginner's Bible
- Beyblade
- Big School (2007–2013)
- Bird Bath
- Blue Water High
- Boyz and Girlz
- Braceface
- Castle Farm (2010–2014)
- City of Friends (2011–2014)
- Collecting Things
- Cowboyz and Cowgirlz
- Cybersix
- Daigunder
- Dan Dare: Pilot of the Future
- Dappledown Farm (1998–2005)
- The Day Henry Met (2018–2020)
- Deepwater Black
- Demolition Dad
- Dig and Dug with Daisy
- Donkey Kong Country
- Don't Blame the Koalas
- Dragon Booster
- Duel Masters
- Enchanted Tales
- The Enid Blyton Adventure Series
- Eric Carle Stories
- Family!
- Fat Dog Mendoza
- Funky Town
- Funky Valley
- Gadget and the Gadgetinis
- Gerald McBoing-Boing (2005–2016)
- Gigglebug
- Groundling Marsh
- Hana's Helpline (2007–2014)
- Havakazoo
- Igam Ogam (2009–2015)
- Insect Antics
- James the Cat (1998 series)
- Klootz
- Land of the Lost
- Lassie
- Lily's Driftwood Bay (2015–2017)
- The Littl' Bits
- Little Antics
- Little Lodgers (2007–2016)
- Loggerheads
- Looney Tunes
- Luo Bao Bei (2018)
- Max Steel
- MechaNick (2003–2008)
- Mega Babies
- Milkshake! Bop Box (2009–2020)
- Milkshake! Bopping About (2017–2024)
- A Milkshake! Christmas
- Milkshake! Festive Fun
- Milkshake! Music Box (2008–2022)
- The Milkshake! Show (2007–2016)
- Milkshake! Show Songs
- A Milkshake! Summer
- The Milky and Shake Show (2008–2011)
- Mirror, Mirror
- Mist: Sheepdog Tales (2007–2015)
- Monkey Makes
- The Secret Life of Puppies
- Slugterra
- Snobs
- The Softies
- Stickin' Around
- Strange Dawn
- ThunderCats
- TooMuchTV (2000)
- Trex
- The Tribe
- USA High
- Wanda and the Alien (2014–2018)
- What-a-Mess
- What Makes Me Happy
- When I Grow Up
- Why!
- Wil Cwac Cwac
- The Wind in the Willows
- Wissper (2015–2021)
- Wizards of Waverly Place
- The Wonder Years
- Woolamaloo
- The WotWots (2009–2017)

==== Programming from Cartoon Network (U.S.) ====
- The Powerpuff Girls

==== Programming from Playhouse Disney (U.S.) ====
- Bear in the Big Blue House (2000–2007)
- The Book of Pooh (2002–2008)

==== Programming from Nickelodeon (U.S.) ====
- Abby Hatcher (2020–2021)
- Blaze and the Monster Machines (2015–2018)
- Bubble Guppies (2013–2016)
- Butterbean's Café (2019–2021)
- Dora and Friends: Into the City! (2015–2016)
- The Fairly OddParents (2016–2017)
- iCarly
- KaBlam!
- The Loud House (2020–2021)
- Nella the Princess Knight (2017–2020)
- Olivia (2009–2012)
- Oswald (2002–2009)
- Rise of the Teenage Mutant Ninja Turtles (2018–2019)
- Rusty Rivets (2017–2019)
- Ryan's Mystery Playdate (2020)
- Shimmer and Shine (2016–2020)
- Sunny Day (2019–2020)
- Teenage Mutant Ninja Turtles (2013–2018; 2023)
- Top Wing
- True Jackson, VP

==== Programming originally produced for or aired on PBS Kids ====
- Angelina Ballerina: The Next Steps (2011–2017)
- Barney and Friends (2002–2007)
- Bert and Ernie's Great Adventures (2008–2015)
- Elmo's World (2002–2012)
- Franny's Feet (2003–2009)
- George Shrinks
- Jay Jay the Jet Plane (2002–2009)
- Make Way for Noddy (2002–2016)
- Wimzie's House

==== Other acquired programming ====
- A House That's Just Like Yours
- Abby's Flying Fairy School (2010–2015)
- Adventures from the Book of Virtues
- The Adventures of Bottle Top Bill and His Best Friend Corky
- The Adventures of Dodo
- Alvin and the Chipmunks
- Animal Antics
- Animal Express
- Animal Families
- Animal Xtremes
- Babar
- Bananas in Pyjamas (2012–2017)
- Beast Wars: Transformers
- Becca's Bunch
- Chiro and Friends (2008–2013)
- Chloe's Closet (2012–2017)
- Digby Dragon (2017–2022)
- Ebb and Flo (2005–2011)
- Fifi and the Flowertots (2005–2014)
- Franklin (2002–2009)
- Harry and His Bucket Full of Dinosaurs (2005–2014)
- Havakazoo
- Hi-5 (2002–2008)
- James the Cat
- Jane and the Dragon
- Jelly Jamm (2012–2016)
- LazyTown (2013–2016)
- Maple Town
- Mio Mao (2004–2017)
- Miss Spider's Sunny Patch Friends
- The Mr. Men Show (2008–2018)
- Mr. Men and Little Miss
- Muppet Babies
- Noddy in Toyland (2009–2017, 2020–2021)
- Nosey
- Number Adventures
- Old Bear Stories
- Olive the Ostrich (2011–2013)
- Olly the Little White Van (2011–2018)
- PB Bear and Friends
- Pets! (2016–2018)
- Pip Ahoy! (2014–2018)
- Play!
- Plonsters
- Pocoyo (2005–2011)
- Poppy Cat (2017–2018)
- Popular
- Power Rangers
  - Power Rangers Megaforce
  - Power Rangers Samurai
- Puffin Rock (2017–2018)
- Roary the Racing Car (2007–2018)
- Rolie Polie Olie (2002–2008)
- Roobarb/Roobarb and Custard Too (2005–2013, 2016)
- Rupert Bear, Follow the Magic... (2006–2014, 2017)
- Sailor Sid (2004–2012)
- Sandy and Mr. Flapper
- The Save-Ums! (2003–2015)
- Say it with Noddy (2005–2009)
- Seaside Antics
- Secret Life of Toys
- The Secret of Eel Island
- The Shoe People
- Simon (2017–2019)
- The Singing Kettle (2001–2005)
- Singled Out
- Sister Said
- Tickety Toc (2012–2016)
- Tickle, Patch and Friends
- Tiger, Tiger
- Titch
- The Triplets
- Toby's Travelling Circus (2012–2017)
- Toot the Tiny Tugboat (2014–2017)
- The Treacle People
- The World of Peter Rabbit and Friends
- Zack and Quack

=== Upcoming programmes ===
- Thomas & Friends: Railway Stories

== Comedy ==
Channel 5 currently shows Friends each weekend with a block of episodes shown back-to-back in the mornings. Prior to the channel acquiring Friends (along with sister channel Comedy Central), the channel premiered spin-off series Joey, though this series is not being broadcast as part of the re-runs in 2021. Numerous other American sitcoms were shown on Channel 5, including the first season of Two and a Half Men, the first 2 seasons of Everybody Hates Chris and the revival of Will and Grace, though by 2021 these shows were either moved by ViacomCBS to 5Star and Comedy Central or were picked up by rival broadcasters.

=== Sitcoms ===
Sitcoms aired on the channel include:

- Two and a Half Men (rights picked up by ITV4)
- 8 Simple Rules
- Angelo's
- Borderline
- Everybody Hates Chris
- Friends (Moved from E4. Also on Comedy Central)
- The Golden Girls
- Hospital!
- Hotel!
- Joey (TV Series)
- Mr. Bean
- Respectable
- Suburban Shootout
- Swinging
- That's So Last Week
- Top Buzzer
- Will and Grace (Moved from Channel 4. Also on 5Star)

=== Comedy sketch and panel shows ===
- Bring Me The Head of Light Entertainment
- Impractical Jokers UK ( a joint commission alongside Comedy Central UK)
- The Jim Tavare Show
- We Know Where You Live
- The What in The World? Quiz

== Daytime ==
Channel 5 has always struggled to make inroads into the daytime TV ratings having tried a variety of magazine formats, quizzes and discussion shows since 1997. In the early days, Channel 5's morning schedules consisted mainly of American imports such as the soaps The Bold and the Beautiful and Sunset Beach. Between 1998 and 2003, Gloria Hunniford hosted Open House with Gloria Hunniford, an afternoon chat and lifestyle magazine show featuring interviews, cookery and consumer advice.

On 2 June 2003, Terry Wogan and Gaby Roslin joined the channel to host the morning talk show The Terry and Gaby Show, which lasted only 10 months, as it could not compete with ITV's This Morning. In September 2004, Trisha Goddard left ITV Anglia to join Channel 5 in a new programme titled Trisha Goddard, which made its debut on 24 January 2005. Similar in style to her old show, it focused on relationships, families in crisis, and reunions. In January 2009, Channel 5 announced it was not renewing her contract for financial reasons.

Until March 2007, the station screened quiz show BrainTeaser which was presented by Alex Lovell. After 4 and a half years, BrainTeaser was withdrawn, following the revelation that production staff were faking winners on the programme's premium rate call-in competition. Other game shows have since been aired in daytime, including a new version of Going for Gold and Wordplay.

In February 2008, the station acquired the Australian soap Neighbours from BBC One, and moved its lunchtime showing of Home and Away to follow Neighbours.

In September 2010, documentary series Eddie Stobart: Trucks and Trailers featured haulage firm Eddie Stobart's Haulage, Rail and Air divisions. The programme followed drivers responsible for delivering diverse orders such as the new pitch at Cardiff's Millennium Stadium, and the lights to be installed at London's famous Piccadilly Circus.

The Vanessa Show presented by Vanessa Feltz was launched in a morning timeslot in January 2011. Following low ratings, the format was moved to an afternoon slot but the programme was not a success and it was axed in June 2011.

In 2013, Channel 5 bought the rights to screen Trisha Goddard's American version of her former chat show Trisha Goddard, which was broadcast on Channel 5 until 2009. However, due to low viewing figures, the programme is thought to have been pulled from the schedules.

Currently, Channel 5's daytime schedule consists of the flagship programme Jeremy Vine with the soaps Neighbours and Home and Away its main ratings successes. In the afternoons, the channel usually screens American and Canadian TV movies and sometimes US produced mini-series and one-off TV dramas. Its daytime and weekend morning schedules also contain repeats of documentaries, lifestyle programming and American crime series.

=== The Wright Stuff ===
In 2000, Channel 5 launched its flagship daytime show The Wright Stuff presented by Matthew Wright in which celebrity guests on a panel debate news stories in front of a small audience. In January 2011, The Wright Stuff was extended to an hour and 45 minutes from 09:15 to 11:00am. From June 2011, the format was extended further with the launch of The Wright Stuff Extra with Gabby Logan presented by former BBC Radio 5 Live host Gabby Logan, however this was later dropped from the schedule, with the main show being extended a further 10 minutes, now airing from 09:15 to 11:10am.

=== Jeremy Vine ===
In 2018, Matthew Wright left his morning television show The Wright Stuff after 18 years, leaving the 09:15 to 11:15am show without a host and the problem of the programme's punning title. When BBC Radio 2 presenter Jeremy Vine was announced as the new host, it was decided that the programme would continue simply under his name, with the show having the same format as The Wright Stuff, the same timeslot and presenter Storm Huntley continuing in the same role as before. In 2021, Jeremy Vine could be seen top-and-tailing the Channel 5 daytime schedule as the rights to the 12 Yard produced show Eggheads had been acquired by Channel 5 from the BBC, with new episodes of the Jeremy Vine presented quiz show going out each night at 6.30pm.

On 17 January 2022, it was announced that Vine's morning show slot would be extended by an hour from 19 January 2022 by dropping the scheduled repeat of Nightmare Tenants, Slum Landlords at 12:15pm and moving Shoplifters and Scammers: At War with the Law by an hour. The extended part of the programme will be known as Jeremy Vine Extra with the hour hosted by Storm Huntley, as Vine has a radio show on BBC Radio 2 that starts at 12:00pm (though for the schedules of 19 January, Tina Daheley is sitting in for Vine on the radio).

== Documentaries ==
Channel 5 has broadcast a number of documentaries following the lives of numerous individuals. The Hotel Inspector hosted initially by Ruth Watson and later by Alex Polizzi is an example of 1 of the channel's documentaries and is one of the channel's most watched programmes. The Business Inspector was a four-part spin-off show presented by Hilary Devey in 2010 who later moved to become a dragon on the BBC's Dragon's Den. In 2011, the channel hosted the latest addition to the 'Inspector' franchise, The Restaurant Inspector.

Animal and nature programmes have been a popular element in Channel 5's schedules with a number of series often repeated. These include Michaela's Zoo Babies, Wild Animal ER, Animal Rescue Squad, Vets in Action and Zoo Days. Older series such as Nick's Quest are repeated in the early morning schedules. Monkey World aired a new series in 2011 but the emphasis on wildlife and animal rescue programmes has been reduced since 2008. In August 2011, the channel broadcast repeats of Meerkat Manor the popular wildlife documentary series 1st broadcast on BBC TV. In 2012, Dominic Monaghan's Wild Things aired, a series that followed British actor Dominic Monaghan travel the globe to find – and then handle – some of the biggest and most dangerous creatures on the planet.

Educational documentaries have also been prominent in Channel 5's schedule, many originally produced for the Discovery Channel. Highland Emergency and How Do They Do It? are often shown in the 7:30pm slot. The 8pm slot is often filled with male-oriented programmes such as Ice Road Truckers, Police Interceptors, Emergency Bikers, Revealed (mystery and archaeology), Monster Moves, Nature Shock and the Demolition series. The documentary series, Sea Patrol UK has aired since 2009 and in 2011, the spin-off show, Royal Navy: Caribbean Patrol made its début.

From 2002, the channel aired several major documentary series on the arts, architecture, philosophy and religion representing a major shift away from the station's previous down-market image. These included series on the lives of the great artists presented by Tim Marlow who also presented regular previews of major art exhibitions and a series on Tate Modern. Divine Designs, presented by Professor Paul Binski examined religious architecture around the UK with two series. These arts programmes are no longer produced on a regular basis but are often repeated.

Crime series are another established part of the Channel 5 schedule, some repackaged repeats such as True CSI and Forensic Files and the channel has featured several series on serial killers such as Fred West, Myra Hindley and Jack the Ripper. In 2012, crime series Born to Kill? was screened, which delved into the matter of whether killers such as Harold Shipman and Fred West were born to kill. Another crime series titled Murder Files was also broadcast in 2012, which focused on several notorious criminal cases such as The Schoolboy Assassin, looking back at how police eventually caught their killer. Countdown to Murder aired in 2013, a unique new crime show that follows a countdown of events that led to the murder of a victim.

New programming for 2011 included a series titled Candy Bar Girls based on the lives of young lesbian women in a bar in London's Soho district. 2011 also saw Justin Lee Collins present Living in Las Vegas and The Restaurant Inspector, building on the success of The Hotel Inspector. In 2011, Collins also presented the documentary series, Justin Lee Collins Turning Japanese. Additionally, the four-part documentary series, Essex Jungle aired in Spring 2011 focusing on the world of exotic, often dangerous reptiles living in people's homes.

In 2012, Chris Tarrant became the presenter of a documentary series titled Chris Tarrant: Extreme Railways, with new episodes broadcast on the channel until 2020. Each week, Tarrant undertook a railway journey in a foreign country, meeting the passengers and people who work on railways which go through extreme environments. Tarrant also delved into the history of these extreme railways and found out how they were built. In 2017, Channel 5 showed another train-based series with Tarrant, this time delving into the history of lines and companies in the United Kingdom. The series was called The Railways That Built Britain with Chris Tarrant, and was followed by a couple of series about trains (Intercity 125: The Train That Changed Britain' and World's Busiest Train Stations) which were narrated by Tarrant.

In 2013, Channel 5 broadcast Ben Fogle: New Lives in the Wild, which followed the presenter as he travelled to meet some of the world's few people who have swapped the usual life for something a little different, such as living in a desert as opposed to living in New York City. The programme regularly ranked among the channel's top ten. In November 2015, Fogle's spin-off series New Lives In The Wild UK introduced Channel 5 viewers to farmers Amanda and Clive Owen, who would go on to have their own Channel 5 show called Our Yorkshire Farm.

Also in 2013, Channel 5 broadcast Gibraltar: Britain in the Sun, a documentary following the life of the residents in the British Overseas Territory of Gibraltar. The six-part series enjoyed steady ratings, and as a result was recommissioned for a second series which aired shortly afterwards in 2014.

In 2014, the channel pioneered "Supersize Season", which included sets of documentaries each attached to the same theme of supersize people. Documentaries produced within this season included Saving Britain's Biggest Man, Fat For Cash, My Gastric Band Ruined My Life, Too Fat To Fly, Got Thin - Got Fat Again! and I Lost Weight and Lost My Husband. The use of "seasons" was a common theme during 2014, with Nazi Season, a season dedicated to the Nazis, also produced.

In 2017 Channel 5 aired two new documentary series - Secrets of the National Trust with the anchor host Alan Titchmarsh and Tony Robinson: Coast to Coast

In December 2021, Channel 5 acquired the fifth series of Meerkat Manor from Oxford Scientific Films/BBC America for its 6.30pm slot (usually featuring Eggheads). The programme, known internationally as Meerkat Manor: Rise of the Dynasty was narrated by Bill Nighy and tracked the meerkat mobs known under the group names Whiskers, Hakuna Mata and Ubuntu. When Neighbours went on its Christmas break, Meerkat Manor was put with a half-hour version of Dogs With Incredible Jobs at 6pm, adding to Channel 5's slate of natural history and animal programmes, which has also seen the Secret Life of the Forest (showing various wildlife residing in Kielder Forest, Northumberland) broadcast in November 2021.

In spring 2022, the channel went back to stripping documentary series across the week in the afternoon and early evening, with the channel trying out a new format with Susan Calman in the 7pm slot called Big Antique Adventure which also featured the antiques experts Natasha Raskin Sharp, Danny Sebastian and Paul Martin. In addition to this, Bargain-Loving Brits in the Sun was recommissioned as a 40-part series to run every weekday at 4pm, where previous series have been made up of around eight-to-ten episodes going out on Sunday nights. The series, set around Benidorm and Malaga, features drag queen showbars, animal rescue centres and the residents of various caravan parks, in addition to emigrants making a living on Spain's markets. As well as this 40-part series 8, earlier Bargain-Loving Brits programmes have been repeated in this lot along with the 2013-2014 series Gibraltar: Britain in the Sun, which turned up on electronic programme guides as Bargain Brits in the Sun to fit the title format of the more recent show.

The changing of programme titles on Channel 5 is a regular occurrence, with the channel known for changing a programme title at short notice or having an on-screen title that does not correspond with that of the Radio Times or electronic programme guide. On 10 June 2022, the channel finishes off showing their Allo Allo! Brits in France series, which follows the lives of various ex-pats in the country, such as Andy and Richard, the owners of a restaurant called Les Roches on the banks of the River Sioule in Auvergne. Whereas the programme previously used the name of the old BBC One sitcom 'Allo 'Allo! in its title, the series has been rebranded as The Good Life: Brits in France, also using the name of an old BBC One sitcom.

=== Yorkshire ===
In the 2010s, Channel 5 became known, in certain parts of the media, as the TV channel which is obsessed with Yorkshire, so much so that commissioning editor Daniel Pearl had to tell a television festival audience that he did not want to see "another programme about Yorkshire". Programmes based in Yorkshire include The Yorkshire Steam Railway: All Aboard, filmed on the North Yorkshire Moors Railway (NYMR) based at Pickering railway station, The Yorkshire Vet, with filming taking place at local farms and in a number of vet surgeries in Yorkshire (including one in Kirkbymoorside, 7 miles away from the NYMR in Pickering), Traffic Cops (which featured episodes with North Yorkshire Police), Yorkshire: A Year In The Wild and Today at the Great Yorkshire Show

=== Royal Documentaries ===
Saturday night royal documentaries have been a ratings winner for Channel 5, with programmes about past members of the British Royal Family also getting good viewing figures, with a programme about King George V (whose reign was from 6 May 1910 until 20 January 1936) achieving a rating of 1.4 million viewers when it was first broadcast. Most of these documentaries are made by ITN Productions and feature archive clips with contributions from historians and royal watchers like former BBC royal correspondent Jennie Bond. These documentaries have become a dependable part of the weekend line-up, and can be dropped into the schedule at the last minute to replace under-performing scheduled programmes, as was the case when the 3rd episode of the new Challenge Anneka series was replaced by Zara & Mike: The People's Royals and Fergie & Meghan: Inconvenient Royal on 1 April 2023. As well as the British Royal Family, the slot was used to schedule an ITN documentary called The Grace of Monaco: Hollywood Princess about Grace Kelly, the American actor who married Prince Rainier III of Monaco in April 1956, one of the few titles featuring foreign-born royalty.

=== 8 O'Clock Heroes (2011) ===
In 2011, the 8pm daily weekday documentary slot was given the title "8 O'Clock Heroes" with a stripped content of action-packed documentaries focusing on police, emergency services and other "heroic" deeds. Series included in the strand include Police Interceptors and Emergency Bikers. Other series in the strand include Supersize Grime, a fly-on-the-wall documentary series focusing on the world of industrial cleaners from the makers of ITV1's popular Grimefighters and Sky 1's Real Filth Fighters.

In the following decade sister channel 5Star was repositioned as a more of a reality TV channel, than the youth TV channel it once was, and so a lot of its comedy programmes were dropped in favour of programming with emergency services. This meant that shows such as Skin A&E, 999: Critical Condition and Ambulance: Code Red were more likely to debut on that channel first before being seen on Channel 5. However, after being a programme title used to bulk out the schedule on 5Star or Paramount, series 20 of Police Interceptors was commissioned to debut on the main channel at 8pm on 10 November 2021, with the repeats continuing in daytime on its sister channels.

=== Consumer advice programming ===
By 2022, the channel have decided to use their 8 O'Clock Hour to schedule a number of consumer advice programmes, the majority of which have been presented by Alexis Conran and scheduled for Thursday nights. Unlike the BBC, who still use the Watchdog branding for their consumer advice features on The One Show, Channel 5 have not grouped Conran's shows around one title, with the programmes having names like Call Centre Chaos: Britain On Hold, Britain's Dog Poo Scandal and Phone Scams: Don't Get Caught Out. In addition to these programmes, Conran has also presented the series Secrets of Fast Food Giants for the channel and has been one of the presenters hired to host the channel's Jeremy Vine Extra programme while Storm Huntley is on maternity leave.

In addition to Conran's investigative consumer advice shows, the channel has reported on holiday travel problems caused by staff shortages in Britain's Airport Chaos, with a similar show, dealing with rail transport as well, called Britain's Travel Chaos: How To Save Your Summer scheduled for 12 July 2022 at 8pm.

=== Clip and retrospective programming ===
In recent years, the channel emphasises on retrospective clip shows that usually feature celebrity talking heads from stars and critics. These strands include 20 Moments That Rocked..., The Best of Bad TV, When... Goes Horribly Wrong, Most Shocking... Moments, Britain's Favourite..., The... Story and Greatest... among others. These programmes covers a range of topics from TV bloopers to chocolate bars; where the same limited amount of clips have been used from time to time and they are often renamed in EPGs or TV listings guides. The latest programme in this format was Funniest Royal Cock-Ups on 7 November 2021, which had a number of clips where the bloopers featured members of the British Royal family and which had taking head interludes from Paul Burrell, comedian Judi Love and Lady Colin Campbell.

=== Travel shows ===
By 2021, many of the emergency service shows had been moved away from Channel 5 to debut as 1st run programmes on 5Star (with repeats used as schedule fillers either late night or at 7:00pm against the soaps on BBC One or ITV) as Channel 5 decided to introduce a number of shows celebrating the Great British countryside. As well as its numerous shows about Yorkshire (a fact picked up by comedy shows on other channels such as It's Clarkson On TV and Complaints Welcome with Jessica Knappett), the channel has had hits with comedians driving around Britain in campervans, with Paul Merton featuring in Motorhoming with Merton and Webster and Susan Calman diving her 1999 Daihatsu Romahome 'Helen Mirren' around various locations in her Grand Day Out series, a programme which builds on the success of her Secret Scotland show. Other travel shows found on the channel include The Cotswolds with Pam Ayres, Iceland With Alexander Armstrong and the Bill Nighy narrated World's Most Scenic Railway Journeys which has featured British and international train routes over its five series.

In October 2021, Channel 5 picked up the rights to the 2019 Nat Geo series Egypt With The World's Greatest Explorer (known on National Geographic UK as Fiennes: Return to the Nile), which they rebranded as The Nile with Sir Ranulph Fiennes, a three-part series which they decided to show before The Madame Blanc Mysteries at around 8pm. However, to keep The Madame Blanc Mysteries scheduled against the BBC's reboot of Blankety Blank with Bradley Walsh, they dropped the third episode from Channel 5's line-up on 6 November 2021, deciding to put Sally Lindsay's mystery drama on earlier and a Then & Now documentary about ABBA on at 9.10pm. The final episode of The Nile with Sir Ranulph Fiennes was moved to 5Select on 6 November 2021, replacing an already scheduled episode of Wild Britain at 8pm.

In 2022, Jane McDonald will follow-up her Cruising with... travel shows with a new 6-part commission called Jane McDonald's Yorkshire, while the cruising shows returned on 20 December 2021 with the first episode in a two-part Christmas special that saw new presenter Susan Calman on board the MS Maud in Norway.

=== Documentaries from VIS ===
Cruising with Susan Calman is one of a number of documentaries from Channel 5's VIS (Viacom International Studios) sister company. Other shows and series include Sinatra: King of the Crooners (a feature-length documentary about Frank Sinatra), Terry Wogan: Now You're Talking (about the late BBC Radio 2 breakfast show host), The Wonderful World of Chocolate (with its spin-off series about cakes retitled as Amazing Cakes and Bakes on the EPG) and Inside... (a documentary series which started off looking at places like Kensington Palace, Strangeways and St Paul's Cathedral, before becoming more focused on stores like Harrods, Aldi, Selfridges and John Lewis with a few episodes devoted to hotels like The Savoy). VIS have also provided the channel with a number of historical documentaries such as Our Victorian Christmas (a follow-up to Wartime Christmas from December 2020), D-Day Remembered: Minute by Minute and In the Footsteps of... a series with Gyles Brandreth, which looks at the lives of Jane Austen, Thomas Hardy, Charles Dickens and the Brontes.

In July 2022, with Channel 5 coming to the end of its time broadcasting Neighbours, VIS put into production two programmes to be broadcast alongside The Finale as part of a Neighbours theme night on 29 July 2022. The first programme from VIS for Neighbours Night is a documentary called Neighbours Made Me a Star: From Ramsay St to Hollywood, with the second being a pop clips collection called Neighbours: All the Pop Hits & More, Especially For You which features tracks from Delta Goodrem, Kylie Minogue and Jason Donovan, alongside "Kiss Kiss" by Holly Valance and the video for Stefan Dennis' "Don't It Make You Feel Good?".

In 2023, Paramount Global announced that it was closing VIS, its UK-based non-scripted production division, with all programmes on Channel 5 to be commissioned from various independents in the future. Some of the last productions VIS UK made for Channel 5 included Britpop: The Music That Changed Britain (commissioned as The Story of Britpop), a 4-part music history docu-series which lasted 2 episodes in primetime before being shifted to a late-night slot after the casino, and Nick Knowles' travel programmes in and around the Grand Canyon.

As VIS UK was closing, Viacom Head of Factual & Features executive Oliver Wright moved over to the Objective Media Group to set up the production company Coming Up Roses, where he would continue to produce Nick Knowles travel documentaries and royal palace programmes alongside new commissions like Malta: The Jewel of the Med, The 1970s Dinner Party and Kensington & Chelsea: The Royal Borough In addition, travel shows featuring Susan Calman and Jane McDonald were picked up by Entertainment One's Daisybeck Studios, the company already responsible for Channel 5 programmes like The Yorkshire Vet, ...On the Farm and The Highland Vet, with the company also adding Isle of Wight: Jewel of the South to its production slate for Channel 5.

=== Documentaries from Paramount+ ===
On 28 January 2024, the channel started showing The Big Posh Holiday Swap a six-part series about the ThirdHome home exchange service, whose members swap their million pound properties with other clients of ThirdHome. The programme was based on footage from the American television series Millionaire Holiday Home Swap added to Paramount+ in 2022, with changes added for the British market. After debuting at 10:00pm on 28 January 2024, the second episode was pulled from its 10:30pm timeslot on 4 February 2024 and replaced with a repeat of Nicola Bulley: The Disappearance That Gripped Britain, an investigative documentary which had been first broadcast on Channel 5 two days earlier, with episode 3 being replaced by the 2008 Jason Statham film The Bank Job the week after.

== Drama ==
Channel 5 has occasionally commissioned its own drama series. In 2004, it commissioned the hit drama Murder Prevention which lasted just one series and in 2006, it co-commissioned Tripping Over with Network Ten in Australia. Channel 5 also screened Perfect Day, a commissioned British drama, in 2005. The success of this one-off drama led to the commissioning of a prequel and a sequel, Perfect Day: The Millennium and Perfect Day: The Funeral, which were shown in 2006. In 2009, Channel 5 broadcast a new version of Minder starring Shane Richie. Other dramas broadcast include A Mind to Kill, Beyond Fear, Wing and a Prayer and Urban Gothic.

Channel 5 returned to homegrown drama in 2013, as they announced the commission of police drama Evidence, which was later re-titled Suspects. Suspects has proven one of the more successful original dramas that the network has ever produced and has received praise from critics as well, including those writing for The Guardian and The Daily Telegraph. Keith Watson, writing for the Metro newspaper said it had him hooked and rated it four stars out of a possible five. Jake Wallis Simons said the drama was "unnervingly true to life", calling it sassy and cynical, rating it four stars out of a possible five. The show stars Damien Molony, Fay Ripley and Clare-Hope Ashitey, with all three actors receiving critical praise. Most of the show's dialogue is improvised in order to make it seem natural, the actors have a detailed story document and perform from there. The first series began on 12 February 2014, airing Wednesdays at 10:00pm. After strong critical praise and a relatively strong number of total viewers, Channel 5 renewed the show for two more series, which premiered on 20 August 2014 and 13 January 2015 respectively.

In 2021, Channel 5's version of All Creatures Great And Small was bringing in more than 4 million viewers to its Thursday night slot, a programme joining Sally Lindsay's comedy-drama The Madame Blanc Mysteries and P.D. James' Dalgliesh in its 'Original Dramas' line-up for 2021.

British dramas shown on Channel 5, include:

- 15 Days
- Agatha and the Truth of Murder
- The Alchemists
- Beyond Fear
- Clink (commissioned for 5Star)
- Cold Call (2019)
- Dark Knight
- Deadly Summer
- Doomwatch
- Hear the Silence
- Inquisition
- Menace
- A Mind to Kill
- Minder
- Missed Call
- Murder Prevention
- Number One Fan
- Perfect Day
- Push
- Suspects
- Tripping Over
- Urban Gothic
- Wing and a Prayer

=== Australian ===
On 29 April 2013, Channel 5 announced that they had acquired the rights to air Wentworth. The show is a re-imagining of the classic cult drama Prisoner: Cell Block H, a soap that they had shown repeats of at the turn of the century. The first season premiered under the title Wentworth Prison on 28 August 2013, airing Wednesday nights at 10:00pm. After strong ratings, Channel 5 purchased the second season and set a premiere date for 3 September 2014, where the show aired again on Wednesday nights at 10:00pm. However, as sister channel 5Star moved away from targeting the same youth audience as E4, to a channel featuring emergency services programming like Criminals: Caught on Camera and Police Interceptors it was decided that the drama was a better fit for that channel with later seasons only broadcast there (the last episode of Wentworth: The Final Sentence would be broadcast on 5Star at 10:00pm on 26 October 2021).

On 4 January 2014, Channel 5 premiered Australian comedy crime drama series Mr & Mrs Murder, airing the show Saturday nights at around 6:00pm. The show was pulled from the schedule after three episodes due to poor ratings. Secrets & Lies began on 23 September 2014, the latest Australian drama to air on Channel 5. Upon their acquisition of the show, Katie Keenan (Head of Acquisitions) said, "Channel 5 viewers love compelling, character-led drama packed with twists and turns. Secrets & Lies ticks all these boxes. We're thrilled to add it to our 2014 drama line-up."

In 2021, Fremantle Australia produced the Australian-set drama Lie With Me for broadcast on ViacomCBS' Channel 5 and its Australian channel Network 10. The four-part thriller, branded as a 'Channel 5 Original Drama' in the UK, starred EastEnders' Charlie Brooks alongside former Neighbours actors Caroline Gillmer, Nadine Garner and Brett Tucker.

=== Irish ===
In February 2013, Channel 5 began broadcasting Jack Taylor, a television crime drama that first aired in Ireland. In March 2013, Channel 5 announced another acquisition of Irish drama, Love/Hate. In April 2013, it was confirmed that Channel 5 had acquired the rights to the first two seasons of the drama, with plans to air them as one block of episodes later in the year. A premiere date was later set for 24 July 2013 at 10:00pm.

== Entertainment ==
Channel 5 has screened a variety of entertainment programs. The channel screened game show Fort Boyard from October 1998 to December 2001. Channel 5 bought the rights to Miss World in 1998 and aired the beauty pageant for three years (1998–2000). In April 1999, the channel bought the rights to classic game show It's a Knockout and aired two series of the revived show from 3 September 1999 to 6 January 2001. On 20 April 2001, it was announced that a third series would not be produced and that it would be replaced by two new challenge game shows, The Desert Forges and Under Pressure.

Between 12 January to 9 December 2001, Channel 5 broadcast two seasons of the popular game show The Mole which quickly gained a cult following. In 2003, Channel 5 acquired cult show Robot Wars, previously shown on BBC Two, though the show ended soon after this.

The evening magazine show Live from Studio Five was launched in September 2009 with a strong emphasis on entertainment news. The show was axed in February 2011 and replaced with OK! TV co-hosted by Kate Walsh who also presented the former show. As part of the relaunch of February 2011, Channel 5 commissioned a range of new entertainment programming including Impossible with mind-reader Philip Escoffey hosting a gameshow with a jackpot of £40,000.

Blind Date returned in 2017 on Channel 5. The new series began airing on 17 June 2017 in its usual Saturday night slot and is produced by So Television and Stellify Media, a firm part-owned by Sony Pictures Television. Paul O'Grady presents the revived series. Melanie Sykes became the new voice of the show, taking over the role most famously held by Graham Skidmore in the original series.

After success with her cruising and travelogue shows such as Holidaying with Jane McDonald and Cruising Down Under, Jane McDonald was given her own entertainment show Jane & Friends which was produced in-house by Channel 5's parent company ViacomCBS in Manchester. The programme would go on to win the RTS North West Award for Best Light Entertainment show and would feature McDonald singing a range of songs with her band and with special guests such as Spandau Ballet's Tony Hadley.

=== Quiz shows ===
In the last five years, Channel 5 have picked up a couple of game show formats from the BBC, with National Lottery show Win Your Wish List, in which families answer questions to win prizes from their wish list, reformatted as a star vehicle for Gino D'Acampo and Eggheads continuing on the channel with Jeremy Vine (with new episodes debuting on Channel 5 at 6:30pm, whilst BBC Two show old episodes at lunchtime). In addition to the new series of the standard quiz, Channel 5 also commissioned a new series of the spin-off Celebrity Eggheads, with Vine questioning Channel 5 presenters Anne Diamond, Jon Bentley, Kemi Majeks and Gyles Brandreth in the first episode (with the celebrities coming from Vine's morning show, The Gadget Show, Milkshake! and the channel's various literary walks).

In the early days of the channel, one of the first quiz shows to appear was Whittle broadcast from the second day of transmission until December 1997. The show was presented by Jeremy Vine's brother Tim, a comedian who also has the distinction of being the first man to appear on Channel 5 when he co-hosted the launch programme on 30 March 1997, alongside Julia Bradbury and musical guests The Spice Girls.

== Erotica and Adult programming ==
=== Controversy ===
In 1998, the channel began to show more risqué late-night programmes such as Compromising Situations, Hotline and the controversially explicit Sex and Shopping. In 1999, there was a large increase in adult entertainment shown on the channel, including UK Raw and Red Shoe Diaries, giving the channel a reputation for being home to hours of pornography. Adult entertainment, live football, and the 21:00 films were the main source of viewing for the channel at the time. As the broadcaster entered the 2000s, changes were made to address this problem. The level of adult entertainment was scaled back, and reality shows such as Naked Jungle and The Mole proved popular.

=== Sex and Power: Celebrity Wars ===
On 31 August 2021, a new three-part documentary series about celebrity and newspaper tabloid culture called Sex & Power started with an episode featuring interviews with Kerry Katona, Ulrika Johnson and Danniella Westbrook, called Celebrity Wars. It was listed in the schedules at 9pm with repeats of fly-on-the-wall documentary Adults Only and episodes of Red Shoe Diaries following it. On 1 September 2021 all the scheduled shows were replaced by documentaries about emergency services, though the three episodes of Sex & Power were put on streaming service My5 (with the episodes available until June 2026) and Adults Only could be seen on 5Star.

== Lifestyle and cookery ==
Early evening lifestyle and makeover programmes formed a major part of Channel 5's early schedules and they saw a revival in 2011. Former series include property shows, such as House Doctor, presented by Ann Maurice, Build a New Life in the Country and How Not to Decorate, presented by Colin McAllister and Justin Ryan. Makeover and property shows have declined in Channel 5's schedules but former series such as House Doctor and Housebusters are often repeated in the daytime and early morning schedules. In 2011, the channel launched new makeover programmes Garden ER and Superior Homes with Kelly Hoppen. In September 2011, a new cookery show with a focus on healthy eating was launched, Real Food Family Cook Off sponsored by Tesco.

In 2012, Channel 5 introduced property show Half Built House, which was fronted by property guru Sian Astley, and focused on Astley rescuing homes that have had DIY disasters. Best House In The Street, another property show, also went to air in 2012, and saw Charlie Luxton transform a family's home in each episode.

In 2013, Great Northern Cookbook aired, a cookery series following Sean Wilson (best known for his role in Coronation Street, a Michelin-star chef) as he travels around the North of England, cooking up recipes past and present, exploring the heritage of the towns, completing a series of competitive challenges, and hoping to please the locals.

=== Marco Pierre White's Kitchen Wars ===
In June 2012, chef Marco Pierre White launched his own cookery competition show, comprising seven 60-minute episodes, to find a couple who creates Britain's Best Dining Experience.

The premise of the show from Channel 5 is: Marco Pierre White uses his culinary eye to find the UK's best restaurant partnerships balancing good food with seamless service. They're fighting for a place in a studio restaurant, where the top three couples will each be given both their own kitchen and set of diners to impress. It's not just about being a good chef; it's also about having the skills to run the best restaurant. Who will make the cut?

== Music shows ==
Channel 5's first regular music chart countdown was The Pepsi Chart Show which was broadcast on Saturdays from 4 February 1998 to 25 June 2002, and was the channel's first advertiser-supplied programming deal. Over the next couple of decades, music programming was rare apart from within a few one off slots, including licensing Top of The Pops: Christmas 1985 from the BBC for a day of retro programming and nostalgia.

In 2021, Channel 5 started scheduling music chart countdowns and documentaries on Friday nights, with series such as Greatest Hits of the 80s, The Story of Songs and Britain's Biggest 90s Hits made by Viacom International Studios UK (VIS), the British production arm of parent company ViacomCBS, in MediaCity, Salford.

MTV Studios in London produced a three-hour video countdown for the channel, known as The 80s & 90s Mega Mix on My5, with the 1980s lists hosted by former Night Fever presenter Suggs and the 1990s rundowns hosted by Vernon Kay. These programmes were originally broadcast on a Saturday afternoon before being moved to the Friday night music slot.

In October 2021, VIS followed up their 1980s and 1990s chart rundowns, produced using information from the Official Charts Company, with weekly 1970s countdowns, with the episode devoted to 1970 starting on Channel 5 at 10pm on 22 October 2021. These countdowns, featuring vintage videos and performances from foreign music shows (like TopPop and Soul Train) interspersed with taking head comments (from people like Toyah Willcox, David Grant and Barry Blue), were usually followed by a sister 'tracks and facts' clip show, also made by VIS, with titles like The 70s Greatest Pop Groups.

The final countdown in the series, 1979: Britain Biggest 70s Hits, was broadcast after All Creatures Great and Small on Christmas Eve, with the clip shows 70s Greatest Electropop and 70s Greatest Novelty Records scheduled after the countdown. On Christmas Day 2021, Channel 5 devoted all of its hours from 9:15 in the morning until 12:30am (when VIS's The Wonderful World of Chocolate came on) to music and musicals. The channel featured the musical Chitty Chitty Bang Bang, and programmes about ABBA and Kylie Minogue, alongside countdowns under the Britain's Favourite name, devoted to Christmas songs, 1980s hits and party songs (with the latter two programmes in the series repeated on New Year's Eve in the run-up to 2022).

In January 2022, Viacom/Channel 5's Greatest Hits of the 80s was reformatted without the chart countdown as 80s Greatest Pop Videos, keeping the regular talking head comments (from 'experts' such as Paul Gambaccini, Nina Myskow, Katie Puckrik, as well as pop stars from the period such as Carol Decker, Nick Heyward, Andy Summers, Midge Ure and Clare Grogan) and adding tracks that were not already covered by the Official Charts Company's Top 30 of the year. Again ten episodes were commissioned for the 1980s, with Mark Powell and Malcolm Donkin overseeing the production, as per the previous Friday night music shows.

In addition to programmes featuring pop stars such as Adele, Ed Sheeran and ABBA, the channel have ordered a number of programmes featuring country music stars such as Dolly Parton, with various documentaries and 'tracks and facts' video playlist shows (such as their Kings of Country compilation) broadcast by the channel. The channel will also mark the last ever episode of long-running Australian soap Neighbours, with a playlist show called Neighbours Greatest Hits featuring hits from Delta Goodrem, Natalie Imbruglia, Rogue Traders, Kylie Minogue and Holly Valance, alongside Stefan Dennis' video for his single "Don't It Make You Feel Good?"

On 28 August 2022, the MTV Video Music Awards was held at the Prudential Center in New Jersey and due to the link between the channel and Paramount Global's MTV in America, the ceremony was again scheduled for a free-to-air late night slot on Channel 5 the day after, similar to previous MTV VMA and EMA shows.

== News ==
Channel 5's news service relaunched as 5 News on 14 February 2011. In September 2021, Ofcom approved the removal of Channel 5's 6.30pm news slot by in order for the channel to schedule Neighbours at 6pm and Eggheads at 6.30pm (with a new hour long 5 News programme going out at 5pm). The first hour long-version of 5 News at 5 was broadcast by Channel 5 on 8 November 2021, with programme presented by Sian Williams and Claudia-Liza Vanderpuije. 5 News at 5 has a live reporting team across the UK and is produced by ITN, who were also given an extra hour on Channel 5 every weekday in 2022, with an extension to their morning current affairs phone-in programme called Jeremy Vine Extra.

== Participation television ==
Quiz Call was broadcast simultaneously on Five, Fiver and Five USA on Friday, Saturday and Sunday nights between around 00:00 and 04:00/04:30. The phone-in quiz show invited viewers to play along for a chance to win cash prizes in return for solving on-screen puzzles. Entrants must be aged eighteen or over to participate and each call and SMS text is charged whether an entrant successfully gets through to the show or not. Quiz Call ended its programming on Five when the channel signed with NetPlayTV to air its Live Roulette programming from midnight to 04:00 - 7 nights a week. This marked the first time a channel had aired a roulette related show in British television history. Currently named SuperCasino, it was one of the two remaining roulette shows on television, along with Jackpot247 which is also produced by NetPlayTV and broadcast on ITV. SuperCasino ended on the channel during the early hours of 1 January 2019. A new roulette show called 21.co.uk has been broadcasting on the channel from 21 May 2019.

== Reality television ==
Channel 5 has a history of broadcasting reality TV shows. Shows broadcast include a UK version of The Mole, to which the channel acquired the format rights, and which was well received: the website UKGameshows.com announced that The Mole beat The Crystal Maze to win its first reader poll to find the best UK gameshow of all time. There was also a series of Touch the Truck and Jailbreak, however these were less successful.

In 2004, the channel hosted the "ultimate" reality show, Back to Reality featuring contestants from a variety of reality shows under one roof. Despite high hopes, the series failed to gain a large audience. Another programme broadcast was Make Me a Supermodel, a reality show in which contestants try to win a contract with the Select Modelling Agency. The format lasted two series, and the second series was also featured on 5*.

The winner of Big Brother 11 and Channel 5's OK! TV reporter Josie Gibson was given her own 3-part reality show, There's Something About Josie which aired in May 2011.

In Solitary: The Anti-Social Experiment aired on Channel 5 on 28 August 2017, and was produced by Stellify Media. The programme involved three members of the public being locked up in solitary confinement for five days and was presented by George Lamb (who also participated in the experiment). A celebrity edition of the format called Celebs In Solitary in which Anthea Turner, Professor Green, Eddie Hall, and Shazia Mirza attempt to spend five days in solitary confinement was also made (also presented by Lamb). Even though Stellify Media promoted the format as an entertainment show, this gruelling, psychological 'anti-social' experiment was usually listed as a Factual or Lifestyle programme by others.

A more recent format to air on the channel is Cast Away, in which a well known celebrity is stranded on the uninhabited island of Ankerea, off the coast of Madagascar, for ten days without a film crew and must document the experience themselves. The first series, consisting of two episodes, was aired in April 2023 and starred comedian Ruby Wax. Her friend Joanna Lumley, who starred in Girl Friday, a similar survival programme aired on the BBC in 1994, made a guest appearance in the first episode. A three-part second series was announced in September 2024 with Phillip Schofield revealed as the celebrity taking part.

=== 10,000 BC ===
The survival show 10,000 BC debuted in February 2015. The show is a joint production of Channel 5 and MTV.

The social experiment series follows 20 contestants from across Great Britain, ranging in age from 20 to 65, as they go back to the conditions of the Stone Age and try to survive two months in the wilderness.

=== The Bachelor ===
On 14 June 2011, Channel 5 made the announcement that they will now air the British version of The Bachelor, a spin-off of the popular American reality series, The Bachelor. The British version had previously been broadcast on BBC Three.

In the first series to air on Channel 5 (Series 4), the role of the bachelor was by rugby star and former Strictly Come Dancing contestant Gavin Henson. In the second series to air on Channel 5 (Series 5), the role of the bachelor was by Spencer Matthews, star of the E4 reality TV series Made in Chelsea.

In addition to the UK show, Channel 5 imported The Bachelorette Australia, with singer and Love Island host Sophie Monk in the main role, from Australian sister channel Network 10 for broadcast on 'youth network' 5Star.

=== Big Brother and Celebrity Big Brother ===
On 6 April 2011, it was confirmed that Channel 5 had signed a £200 million contract with media company Endemol to screen former Channel 4 reality show Big Brother for 2 years. The series returned at 9pm on 18 August 2011 with Celebrity Big Brother 8. Series 1 of Celebrity Big Brother on Channel 5 kicked off with the entry of housemates including reality show regulars Kerry Katona, Amy Childs and Jedward. It was followed in September by the twelfth series of the show.

Brian Dowling signed up to be main presenter of the show following the move to Channel 5, whilst Emma Willis became the host of the new spin-off discussion show, Big Brother's Bit on the Side. From Big Brother 2013 Emma Willis is the main presenter.

On 14 September 2018, it was confirmed that both Big Brother and Celebrity Big Brother had been axed by Channel 5. The final series of Celebrity Big Brother was won by Ryan Thomas on 10 September 2018 with the final series of Big Brother launching four days later on 14 September 2018, ending after 53 days on 5 November 2018.

In total Big Brother and Celebrity Big Brother aired twenty-three series on Channel 5 between 2011 and 2018, with 8 regular and 15 celebrity series respectively.

=== Celebrity Super Spa ===
On 17 June 2013, Channel 5 announced that they had commissioned a new reality television show that would follow six celebrities working in a spa based in Liverpool. The celebrities, such as actor Helen Flanagan and chef Rustie Lee, would be taught to pamper, preen and pluck by Herbert Howe, a man with fifty years experience in the hair and beauty industry. Celebrity Super Spa was broadcast later in the year with the six-episode show starting on 13 September 2013 (though the show would be dumped from the schedules before the last episode had been aired).

=== The Farm ===
The Farm was Channel 5's version of the international TV format The Farm. It had a series of celebrities appearing on it during its two series run in 2004-2005 and did attract some controversy as one episode saw Rebecca Loos masturbating a pig in order to collect semen. Channel 5 cancelled The Farm following series two in 2005, though an updated version of the idea called Celebs on the Farm (made originally for 5Star) was briefly shown on Channel 5 in 2019, before ViacomCBS decided that this reality TV show format was a better fit for the demographic of viewers watching MTV and so moved it from a slot on their free-to-air services.

== Soaps ==
=== Family Affairs ===
When Channel 5 launched in 1997, the staple of its earlier programming was the channel's newly commissioned soap, Family Affairs. The soap continued throughout the Channel's life until it was dropped on 30 December 2005 due to poor ratings.

=== Acquired soap operas ===
Channel 5 has screened a number of acquired soap operas. Every episode of the cult Australian soap Prisoner Cell Block H was aired between April 1997 and 11 February 2001 and they also showed another classic Australian soap Sons and Daughters, (which like Prisoner Cell Block H had also been previously shown on ITV in the 1980s and early 1990s) running the entire series between March 1998 and 6 November 2005.

In addition, the channel showed two popular American soap operas Sunset Beach and The Bold and the Beautiful every weekday morning. After the end of Sunset Beach in 1999, the remaining episodes were screened until early 2000. The channel replaced it with another soap opera popular in America Days of Our Lives, though after poor ratings it removed both soaps from weekday morning schedules in 2002.

Channel 5 also acquired the rerun rights to the BBC and Network Ten serial drama Out of the Blue, which were screened from 2009 on Channel 5's digital sister channel, 5*.

==== Neighbours ====
On 18 May 2007, Channel 5 acquired the rights to Australian soap opera Neighbours, previously screened on BBC One. This was the second time UK networks had fought over an Australian soap, with Channel 5 having previously competed over broadcast rights to Home and Away. Neighbours became one of Channel 5's most popular programmes, and was more popular in the United Kingdom than in its home country of Australia, where new episodes debuted on ViacomCBS' digital channel 10 Peach. However, in February 2022, Channel 5 confirmed that Neighbours would not be part of their schedule from August 2022, though ViacomCBS' Australian company Network Ten are still free to find new backers to keep the show in production if they wanted to. The final episode aired on 29 July 2022.

==== Home and Away ====
Channel 5 has had the rights to regularly screen Home and Away in the UK since the early 2000s and was broadcasting it in a double bill along with its fellow Australian soap, Neighbours at lunchtimes and in the early evenings for about 20 years. However, on 8 November 2021 Home and Away lost its early evening slot to Neighbours as the channel launched the hour-long 5 News a 5 which shifted Neighbours back half an hour to 6pm. As another former BBC programme, the quiz show Eggheads, was continuing in its new Channel 5 slot of 6.30pm, Home and Away could only continue on Channel 5 at lunchtimes. The last early evening outing for Home and Away on the channel was episode 7659 on Friday 5 November 2021, with the show debuting new episodes on 5Star at a similar time the week after (until it went on its Christmas break) and with the afternoon repeat still playing back-to-back with Neighbours at 1.15pm on Channel 5 in February 2022.

== Sport ==
Golf coverage consisted of weekly highlights from the PGA Tour, excluding majors, though by October 2021 this coverage had been dropped

Channel 5 broadcasts live coverage of the Great South Run and a few other marathons a 10-mile road race held in Portsmouth in October.

Channel 5 screened World's Strongest Man between 2006 and 2009, and took on the rights again from 2011 to present. On 1 November 2021, Channel 5 will start to strip the UK's Strongest Man 2021 across its television schedules at 7pm each night.

In 2009, Channel 5 signed a deal to broadcast highlights of the Ultimate Fighting Championship (UFC) on terrestrial television in the UK. In 2015, Channel 5 picked up highlights of every BAMMA event. As parent company Viacom also owned the rights to the Bellator MMA brand, their matches were shown free-to-view on Channel 5 and a number of the network's sub-channels until a deal with WWE saw more wrestling being broadcast by the network's channels (by 2021 the UK rights to Bellator MMA had been picked up by the BBC for its iPlayer).

=== Current rights ===
NFL
- NFL Sunday Doubleheader (early game, 6pm on Channel 5 and late game, 9 pm or 9:25 pm on 5Action, Rebranded as 5NFL; the late game start time depends on scheduling - see National Football League on American television for details)

Athletics

- Great Birmingham Run: Live
- Great South Run: Live
- Great Birmingham 10k: Live

Boxing

- Cyclone Promotions & Hennessy Sports

=== Boxing ===
Channel 5 broadcasts occasional boxing matches following a deal with Hennessy Sports. Coverage is presented by Mark Pougatch and Paul Dempsey with punditry from former boxers such as Alex Arthur. Commentary comes from Dave Farrar and Richie Woodhall and have shown fights featuring Josh Taylor, George Groves, Carl Frampton and Tyson Fury. Depending on international rights, Showtime Sports fights may be carried in the UK on Channel 5.

=== Cricket ===
In 2006, Channel 5 began highlights coverage of all of England's Test and limited overs cricket home matches. This followed a period of success for England and when the exclusive live rights to home matches were awarded to Sky Sports, Channel 5 was a surprise choice to pick up the highlights in the light of Channel 4's respected coverage and the BBC's previous interest. Prior to Channel 4, the BBC had long held the rights and Channel 5 were newcomers to cricket, but the coverage has taken up where Channel 4 left off in its coverage (with the help of production company Sunset + Vine). The show also secured former Channel 4 commentators such as Simon Hughes, Geoffrey Boycott and the anchor of Channel 4's coverage Mark Nicholas to offer expert analysis on the day's play. Cricket on 5 (which shows daily highlights of England's matches) is broadcast at 19:00 (or midnight for day/night cricket), with highlights extended to an hour from the previous 45 minutes for the 2011 season. The theme tune as of May 2011 is entitled "The Time is Now", performed by Russ Ballard. Channel 5 coverage continued with the only major change being the replacement of Simon Hughes in 2018 with Alison Mitchell.

Cricket on 5 ended in September 2019 with the conclusion of the 2019 Ashes, BBC Sport won the rights to be the Free to Air partner for ECB Cricket from 2020 to 2024 covering all England Men & Women's Tests, ODI & T20 highlights as well as selected live T20 England International matches and the new Hundred competition. Channel 5 signed off with a thanks from the team and from Joe Root after 13 years, the end of the highlights could mean the end of Sunset & Vine cricket coverage after 20 years with Channel 4 & Channel 5 and could also mean the end of Mark Nicholas career in England after 20 years.

=== Football ===
Until 2012 Channel 5 showed a mix of European and international club football, notably weekly matches or highlights from the Dutch Eredivisie, Portugal's SuperLiga, Primera División Argentina and Copa Libertadores from South America. They acquired exclusive live rights to the Italian Serie A 2007/08 season, but lost them for the following season. For many years Channel 5 showed live matches from the UEFA Europa League and when the package was centralised Channel 5 became the principal rights holder, sharing coverage of the group stages with ITV Sport and ESPN. Channel 5 also held UK rights for the Europa League Final. The channel showed the 2008 FIFA Club World Championship. In 2007, the channel resumed coverage of Major League Soccer (MLS) with a match between Toronto FC and Los Angeles Galaxy on 4 August 2007; the match was expected to be David Beckham's competitive debut as a Galaxy player. In the past, the channel has shown other MLS matches on tape delay or as highlights, generally in the same manner as its coverage of European domestic leagues (excluding Serie A). MLS coverage used to include David Beckham's Soccer USA, a show presented by Tim Lovejoy on Wednesdays at 19:15 during the season to show highlights of the week's matches, funny moments and also interviews with Beckham on his latest match. Other guests made appearances from time-to-time. Channel 5 stopped showing live football after the 2012 Europa League Final with ITV taking over as main broadcaster of the Europa League.

From 2012 to 2015 Channel 5 showed no football but this changed when they got the rights to the Football League, they show highlights from 9.00pm-10.30pm on Saturday nights from the EFL Championship, League One & League Two as well as highlights from the EFL Cup and EFL Trophy for 3 years from 2015 to 2018. The programme was presented by George Riley and Kelly Cates in the first season, Lindsay Hipgrave replaced Cates in the second season and Colin Murray returned to Channel 5 for the 2017–18 season as sole presenter with Caroline Barker also featuring in the studio and as a stand in presenter. On 2 May 2016, Channel 5 showed a football legends match between England and Germany live. Channel 5 lost the highlights to the EFL in 2018 by going to Quest. Quest continue to show EFL highlights at 9pm on a Saturday night with a repeat on Sunday morning, Colin Murray moved to Quest to continue showing the highlights.

=== Motorsport ===
The channel has also covered motor sports, most notably MotoGP from 2000 to 2002 showing every race live before rights were snapped up by BBC Sport, these rights returned in 2017 albeit as highlights with this being broadcast from 7pm-8pm the Monday after a race weekend. Channel 5 held rights to show weekly highlights from the NASCAR Sprint Cup Series and the IndyCar Series, although this was beset by cancellations, inaccurate scheduling and technical difficulties. The channel held right to broadcast highlights from the A1 Grand Prix series. As of 2010, most of their motor sport coverage, including NASCAR, IndyCars, V8 Supercars, Rolex Grand-Am Series and NHRA drag racing has been discontinued. In 2017, Channel 5 announced they had signed a 2-year deal with MotoGP and BT Sport for the free to air rights. They also cover World Rally on Monday at 7pm following a race weekend also broadcasting part of the Wales Rally GB Live.

On 4 September 2016, it was announced that Channel 5 had acquired the UK broadcasting rights to Formula E from the 2016–17 season onwards following Formula E's termination of its contract with ITV. From round three live studio coverage was added with the former ITV team of Andy Jayed and ex-former F1 / Formula E driver Jaime Alguersuari, while commentary comes from the world feed from BBC F1's Jack Nicholls and Dario Franchitti, with Nicki Shields as the pit lane reporter. For rounds one and two Martin Haven stood in for Nicholls.

Channel 5 lost the rights to the coverage for the 2018–19 season to BBC, Quest, and BT Sport, and MotoGP highlights from the 2019 season to Quest. However, starting in the 2020-21 season, they again assist Paramount Global, which holds United States rights to Formula E.

=== Rugby union ===
On 4 May 2017 it was announced that Channel 5 would broadcast up to 5 live Premiership Rugby games for the first time on terrestrial TV for the next four seasons alongside main broadcaster BT Sport. The new deal also sees them broadcast a weekly highlights show of both the premiership and the Premiership Rugby Cup previously shown by ITV. After the demise of the BBC's Rugby Special programme, Channel 5 previously briefly showed free-to-air highlights of English Premiership Rugby during 2000, though these later transferred to Channel 4 for a short time and then subsequently to ITV. Aviva Premiership coverage is presented by former ITV duo David Flatman & Mark Durden-Smith with Flatman also providing commentary alongside Conor McNamara or Mark Robson and Paul Grayson. British Hockey Olympic gold medalist Sam Quek acts as pitch side reporter and completes Channel 5's team. The coverage moved back to ITV from 2022 onwards.

Previously, Channel 5 picked up the rights in 1997 to England v Argentina (shown on the same night as the England football team's World Cup qualifier against Poland). They also broadcast a live match between Scotland and invitation side Barbarians in 2000.

=== American ===
For a brief time, Channel 5 showed professional wrestling in the form of the WCW Worldwide show between Summer 1999 and March 2001 on Friday nights at 7pm, when the company was purchased by World Wrestling Entertainment, and ceased to produce any more shows. Channel 5 returned to covering wrestling in 2018 when Spike bought the rights to cover impact wrestling and this is shown on Friday night at 11pm. From 2 February, Channel 5 will air WWE Raw and WWE Smackdown 1-hour highlights, Saturdays and Sundays at 10:30am.

Until 2010 late-night sports programming had been a feature of the channel since its original launch, especially focusing on live or short-delay coverage of major North American sports. Most notably, the channel covered Major League Baseball games, both regular season and playoffs since its 1st night on air. After the conclusion of Family Affairs, Five's MLB baseball coverage was the longest and continuously run programme on the channel. Jonathan Gould was the host, with former Great Britain national team player Josh Chetwynd as the in-studio analyst. Due to the Great Recession, the channel did not renew its contract to show Major League Baseball in 2009. This left no Baseball available on free to air television in the UK, though Gould, Chetwynd and their producer Erik Janssen continued to broadcast baseball coverage on the digital radio station BBC Radio 5 Live Sports Extra.

Until 2004, Channel 5 also covered the regular season and Stanley Cup playoffs of the National Hockey League; following the lost 2004–05 season, the primary broadcast rights passed to NASN. However, since 2006–07, 5 has relaunched its coverage with a weekly NHL game on short-delay along with highlights of other action from around the league. After the end of the 2009 Stanley Cup Finals, which had been reduced to edited highlights and shunted to a timeslot after 4am, and the NHL did not return to the channel.

Channel 5 also acquired American football and basketball coverage in the wake of Channel 4 dropping them. Channel 5 was the home of terrestrial NFL coverage between 1999 and 2004 and in 2007, the channel renewed its NFL coverage with a 2-year deal to screen Monday Night Football and NBC Sunday Night Football live (the latter coverage began once the MLB Playoffs and World Series ended). Nat Coombs hosted and Mike Carlson, a former college-football player, was the studio analyst, with game commentary taken from the American broadcasters. In 2009, Channel 5 dropped the Monday night game and only broadcast the Sunday night game for the 2009–10 season, with a Saturday morning magazine programme called NFL UK showing highlights and previews of the coming weekend's games. Channel 5 decided not to renew its contract with the NFL for the 2010–11 season, and the sport returned to its original home on UK television, Channel 4 which had shown the sport since the channel's launch in 1982 until 1997. Coombs followed Jonny Gould and Josh Chetwynd to cover the sport on 5 Live Sports Extra, while Carlson hooked up as analyst on Channel 4 with Gary Imlach, and on BBC One alongside Jake Humphrey for their coverage of the NFL International Series held at Wembley, the playoffs and Super Bowl.

The channel also showed Basketball, with the hosts Mark Webster and Andre Alleyne, who took over as analyst from British former NBA star John Amaechi. It generally followed the model of the channel's NHL coverage, a single midweek game either live or on short-delay, plus a review of the previous week's action. Sport coverage has included forays into the NCAA scene, notably the Rose Bowl and the NCAA basketball tournament. On 18 February 2008, Five showed full live coverage of the NBA All-Star Game. Along with all the other sports dropped by the channel, the NBA coverage followed suit - the last game screened was the Los Angeles Lakers' Game 5 win over the Orlando Magic to take the 2009 NBA title.

Current ownership includes in the United States the NFL on CBS brand, an NFL broadcast partner in the United States from 1956 to 1993 and again since 1998, Channel 5 reacquired the rights to Monday Night Football beginning in 2020. Coverage is hosted from Los Angeles by Kirsten Watson, sideline reporter for the Los Angeles Dodgers, and Maurice Jones-Drew, a former running back for the Jacksonville Jaguars. As part of the deal, Channel 5 also runs a Sunday morning pregame show titled NFL End Zone with Cori Yarckin.

== U.S. shows ==
From 2002, the broadcaster pursued an aggressive acquisition strategy, and screened several of the highest-rating American dramas, including all 4 CSI series, all 3 NCIS series, the 1st 3 Law & Order series, The Mentalist, Grey's Anatomy (also shown at that time on Sky Living), House (later moved to Sky 1) and Prison Break (later moved to Sky 1). By 2021, Channel 5 has decided to concentrate on its own dramas like All Creatures Great and Small and The Madame Blanc Mysteries in peak time, with American drama shows, including those from the Law & Order franchise, being moved to 5USA. American productions currently shown on Channel 5 include a number of long-form mystery dramas which have shown in the afternoon TV movie slot, Friends and NFL: Monday Night Football.

=== Shows moved to other Paramount channels in the UK ===
- NCIS (2005–present)
- Person of Interest (2012–present)
- NCIS: New Orleans (2015–present)
- CSI: Cyber (2015–present)
- Impractical Jokers (2016–present)

=== Former ===
- 2
- Alias (moved to Sky1)
- Angel (moved From Channel 4)
- Big Love
- Body of Proof
- Boomtown
- Bones (moved to 5USA)
- Breaking Bad
- Buffy the Vampire Slayer (Season 1 Only)
- Castle (moved to 5USA)
- Charmed (moved to Channel 4)
- Coma
- Criminal Minds (moved to Sky Witness)
- CSI: Crime Scene Investigation (moved to 5USA)
- CSI: Miami (moved to 5USA)
- CSI: NY (moved to 5USA)
- Dallas
- Daria
- Dark Angel (moved to Horror Channel)
- FlashForward
- Gotham (Moved to E4)
- Grey's Anatomy (moved to Sky Witness)
- The Guardian
- Hatfields and McCoys
- Helix (moved to 5*)
- Hercules: The Legendary Journeys
- House (moved to Sky1)
- Killer Instinct
- La Femme Nikita
- Law and Order (moved to 5USA)
- Law and Order: Criminal Intent (moved to 5USA)
- Law and Order: Special Victims Unit (moved to 5USA)
- Lexx
- The Lyon's Den
- Martial Law
- The Mentalist (repeated on 5USA and 5*)
- Once Upon a Time (moved to Netflix UK) (now on Disney+)
- Pacific Blue
- Penn and Teller: Fool Us in Vegas (2016) Jonathan Ross hosted series only (season 2)
- Poltergeist: The Legacy
- Prison Break (moved to Sky1)
- Rizzoli & Isles (moved to 5USA)
- Shark
- The Shield (moved to 5USA)
- Stargate Atlantis
- Star Trek: Voyager
- Stephen King's Bag of Bones
- Sunset Beach
- Tut
- Under the Dome
- Vanished
- The Walking Dead (moved to Spike)
- The X-Files
- Xena: Warrior Princess

== See also ==
- 5 (streaming service)
- 5
- 5Action
- 5Select
- 5Star
- 5USA
