= Animal Antics =

British children's television series

- Also known as: Little Antics; Insect Antics; Aussie Antics; Seaside Antics
- Created by: 2 Sides TV
- Voices of: Derek Griffiths; Jan Francis
- No. of series: 1 (+ 4 spin-offs)
- No. of episodes: 220

Production
- Running time: 5-15 minutes

Original release
- Network: Channel Five (Milkshake)
- Release: 1997 – 2015

Animal Antics is a twice BAFTA-nominated, live-action British pre-school series which aired on Channel 5's Milkshake strand. It was one of the first original children's programme to air when it launched in 1997. The series was produced by Two Side Productions and it Initially run for 80 episodes. Although it only ran for one series, four spin-offs were produced between 2001 and 2015, each narrated by Derek Griffiths.

== Original series ==
Animal Antics was created as a flagship show for Channel 5's children's programming strand, 'Milkshake!'. It was one of the first original shows to air on the channel when it launched in 1997.

Each episode features stories of wildlife and farmyard animals narrated by Derek Griffiths in their natural environment. The series took a fly on the wall look into their lives with Griffiths portraying each animal in a comedy style.

The show aired on weekday mornings, and episodes also aired on weekends during Tickle, Patch and Friends. The show has been broadcast around the world on Nick Jr. A Welsh version of Insect Antics dubbed 'Y Crads Bach' for S4C aired in 2000. In 2018, episodes started airing on the 'Wizz' YouTube channel for children.

== Spin-Off series ==
=== Little Antics ===
In 2001, a spin-off series entitled 'Little Antics' was produced, airing 40 episodes, and like Animal Antics, the series adopted the fly on the wall style. This time each episode followed the lives of young children and their families, both in and out of school, mainly in a reception class in Malvern. Again, this was narrated by Derek Griffiths with Jan Francis. This series was directed by Lisa Evans. This series was rerun on Tiny Living in 2003.

=== Insect Antics ===
In 2003, another 40-episode spin-off series aired, again, narrated by Griffiths. This series was directed by Tracy Nampala, but now followed the lives of insects. Victoria Arlidge provided the music for this series. One episode was featured on the 'Milkshake! Treats' DVD, released in 2005.

=== Aussie Antics ===
Another spin-off series was produced in 2004, airing 40 episodes, but this time, showing different animals in their natural environment with a focus on Australian wildlife. Tracy Nampala also directed this series.

=== Seaside Antics ===
In 2015, a new set of 20 episodes started airing, following a host of different animals that live by the coast. This series was produced by Catherine Robins and aired a decade after the last. Again, Griffiths narrated. This is the last 'Antics' series to have aired to date.
