= Charles Dagnall =

English cricketer and cricket commentator

Personal information
- Full name: Charles Edward Dagnall
- Born: 10 July 1976 (age 50); Bury, England
- Nickname: Charlie, Daggers
- Height: 6 ft 4 in (1.93 m)
- Batting: Right-handed
- Bowling: Right arm fast medium
- Role: Bowler

Domestic team information
- Years: Team
- 1998: Cumberland
- 1999–2001: Warwickshire
- 2002–2004: Leicestershire
- First-class debut: 25 May 1999 Warwickshire v Oxford University
- Last First-class: 16 September 2004 Leicestershire v Somerset
- List A debut: 24 June 1998 Cumberland v Derbyshire
- Last List A: 9 August 2009 Leicestershire v Warwickshire

Career statistics
Competition	FC	LA	T20
Matches	31	57	6
Runs scored	223	197	2
Batting average	10.13	11.58	2.00
100s/50s	0/0	0/0	0/0
Top score	23*	28	2
Balls bowled	4,848	2,490	120
Wickets	87	71	6
Bowling average	31.56	24.30	26.83
5 wickets in innings	2	0	0
10 wickets in match	0	0	0
Best bowling	6/50	4/34	4/22
Catches/stumpings	5/–	6/–	1/–
- Source: CricketArchive, 19 June 2012

Charles Edward Dagnall (born 10 July 1976), also known as Charlie Dagnall, is a cricket commentator and former first-class cricketer who played as a right-arm fast-medium bowler for Cumberland, Warwickshire and Leicestershire.

He has worked as a commentator and pundit for BBC Radio Leicester, in addition to having his own drive time show. He has also commentated on cricket for Test Match Special and Sky Sports. In 2013 he was co-host of NFL UK's Inside the Huddle podcast.
