= Wanda and the Alien (TV series) =

- Genre: Animated series
- Based on: Wanda and the Alien by Sue Hendra
- Voices of: Lara Wollington; Joanna Ruiz; Jen Pringle; Jimmy Hibbert
- Opening theme: "Wanda and the Alien" performed by Victoria Beaumont
- Ending theme: "Wanda and the Alien" (Instrumental)
- Country of origin: United Kingdom
- Original language: English
- No. of seasons: 1
- No. of episodes: 52

Original release
- Network: 5; Nick Jr.
- Release: 30 August 2014 – 21 February 2015

Wanda and the Alien is a British preschool animated children's television series based on the book series of the same name by Sue Hendra.

== Overview ==
When a young and scared alien crashes with his space rocket into the woods, the little rabbit Wanda, and her world becomes even more interesting and exciting. After a few moments of hesitation, they become best friends in the universe.

Based on the best-selling books from award-winning author Sue Hendra. Friendship and exploring differences are the catalyst for each episode as Wanda and Alien, who has crash-landed his rocket in Wanda’s woodland home, become new best friends.

Alien uses his magic to portray everyday things and events in a new light. Episodes follow Wanda and Alien's explorations as Alien slows down movement, takes colours from the rainbow, paints the grass blue and the sky green, makes creatures out of clouds, and turns raindrops into crystals.

As the series progresses and Alien’s rocket is mended, Wanda and Alien travel between each other’s worlds, explore their differences, and understand that friendship is the key to happiness.

== Characters ==
- Wanda (voiced by Lara Wollington) is a female orange rabbit, she wears a blue dress with a white flower pattern on it.
- Alien (voiced by Joanna Ruiz) is a green alien with 4 eyes, his home planet is Quome. Wanda and Alien both have an identical smile. He appears to be wearing a red and orange shirt with matching stripes. Alien is very curious and wants to learn everything about Wanda's home planet. By using his magic, which freezes time, he can create lots of wonderful games for them to play. Once his rocket is mended, he can take Wanda on adventures to his home planet too.
- Mummy Rabbit (voiced by Jen Pringle) is a female rabbit, she's the mother of Wanda.
- Daddy Rabbit (voiced by Jimmy Hibbert) is a male rabbit, he's the father of Wanda.

== Episodes ==
No. overall	No. in series	Title	Original release date
1	1	Rainbow Painting	30 August 2014
2	2	Non Pop Bubbles	31 August 2014
3	3	Pumpkins	6 September 2014
4	4	Rabbit Dance	7 September 2014
5	5	A Star For Wanda	13 September 2014
6	6	Sea Sea, Can't Catch Me	14 September 2014
7	7	Catch a Leaf	20 September 2014
8	8	Hopscotch	21 September 2014
9	9	Lost in a Cloud	27 September 2014
10	10	Shadows	28 September 2014
11	11	Dragonfly	4 October 2014
12	12	Now You See Me, Now You Don't	5 October 2014
13	13	The Perfect Blue	11 October 2014
14	14	Sunbeams	12 October 2014
15	15	Catch	18 October 2014
16	16	Alien Rock Cakes	19 October 2014
17	17	Slippy Slidey Day	25 October 2014
18	18	Quome	26 October 2014
19	19	Family Photo	1 November 2014
20	20	Moon	2 November 2014
21	21	Wanda's New Voice	8 November 2014
22	22	Honey Bees	9 November 2014
23	23	Sunflower	15 November 2014
24	24	Purple Hippo	16 November 2014
25	25	Friends Again	22 November 2014
26	26	Spider in the House	23 November 2014
27	27	Nuts	29 November 2014
28	28	Flying Rabbits	30 November 2014
29	29	Lullaby	6 December 2014
30	30	Underground	7 December 2014
31	31	New Paths	13 December 2014
32	32	Egg	14 December 2014
33	33	Helicopters and Parachutes	20 December 2014
34	34	Sheep Trip	21 December 2014
35	35	Hiccups	27 December 2014
36	36	Workout	28 December 2014
37	37	Raindrop Jewels	3 January 2015
38	38	Quirgi	4 January 2015
39	39	Starfish	10 January 2015
40	40	Tickles	11 January 2015
41	41	A Place to Play	17 January 2015
42	42	Ripple Wheels	18 January 2015
43	43	Time for Tea	24 January 2015
44	44	Quoctor	25 January 2015
45	45	Magical Melodies	31 January 2015
46	46	Clouds	1 February 2015
47	47	Quog	7 February 2015
48	48	Ho Ho in the Snow	8 February 2015
49	49	Bluebells	14 February 2015
50	50	Snow Stomp	15 February 2015
51	51	Round and Round	21 February 2015
52	52	Home Sweet Quome	22 February 2015
