= Naomi Wilkinson =

English television host

- Born: 30 June 1974 (age 51); Bristol, England
- Occupation: Television presenter
- Years active: 1998–present
- Television: Milkshake!, Countryfile
- Spouse: Mark Stevenson

Naomi Wilkinson (born 30 June 1974, in Bristol, England) is an English television presenter.

== Career ==
Wilkinson was a presenter of Milkshake!, the early-morning programming block for young children on Channel 5 and Finger Tips for CITV. Wilkinson took over as the host from Fearne Cotton in series four and remained as the host until the series closed. Prior to joining Milkshake! in 2000, Wilkinson co-presented the breakfast show Wakey! Wakey! for the now-defunct children's channel Carlton Kids. As well as presenting for Milkshake, she has also starred in Milkshake shows such as Havakazoo and Monkey Makes. Wilkinson left Milkshake! in 2012 after 12 years as a main presenter. She now works on shows for CBBC.

Wilkinson went to the United States and became the host of Make Way for Noddy on PBS Kids and The Sunny Side Up Show on PBS Kids Sprout.

Wilkinson joined Steve Backshall on CBBC and BBC Two presenting Live 'n' Deadly in 2010. In 2012, she joined the Ed Petrie vehicle All Over the Place for its second series on CBBC as well as Marrying Mum and Dad in which she also presents with Ed Petrie. Wilkinson currently presents a nature documentary for children on CBBC called Naomi's Nightmares of Nature. Naomi also co-presents CBBC's "Wild & Weird" with Tim Warwood. In 2015, Naomi was one of the judges on the Countryfile photographic competition and has now become a regular presenter on the show itself.

In 2018, she joined 26 other celebrities at Metropolis Studios, to perform an original Christmas song called Rock With Rudolph, written and produced by Grahame and Jack Corbyn. The song was released in aid of Great Ormond Street Hospital and was released digitally on independent record label Saga Entertainment on 30 November 2018 under the artist name The Celebs. The music video debuted exclusively with The Sun on 29 November 2018 and had its first TV showing on Good Morning Britain on 30 November 2018. The song peaked at number two on the iTunes pop chart.

In 2020, amid the COVID-19 crisis, Wilkinson rejoined The Celebs which now included Frank Bruno and X Factor winner Sam Bailey to raise money for both Alzheimer's Society and Action for Children. They recorded a new rendition of Merry Christmas Everyone by Shakin' Stevens and it was released digitally on 11 December 2020, on independent record label Saga Entertainment. The music video debuted exclusively on Good Morning Britain the day before release. The song peaked at number two on the iTunes pop chart.

== Television ==
Wilkinson has been a television presenter since 1998. She started work on Milkshake! for Channel 5 in 2000 where she was producer and presenter. She also worked as a presenter on three of the strands programmes, Havakazoo (from series 3 onwards) and 'Monkey Makes' from 2002-2005 and 'The Milkshake! Show'. She has been a regular presenter on CBBC since 2011 after leaving Milkshake – she has her own show: Naomi's Nightmares of Nature. She also voiceovered for the Community Channel.

In 2013 and 2014, she presented a live show called WILD on CBBC. Wilkinson has also appeared three times on CBBC panel show The Dog Ate My Homework since 2015.

== Personal life ==
She was born in Bristol in 1974. Her entertainment career first started at Butlin's, where she was a Redcoat. In February 2013, she was nominated in the Female On-Screen Talent category for excellence in the Royal Television Society's awards. Wilkinson is one of nine presidents of Better Planet Education.
