= Better Planet Education =

British charity

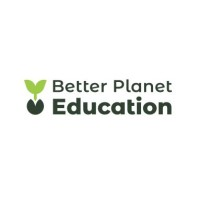
- Founded: 1982
- Registration no.: 1153740 (England and Wales)
- Purpose: Education, children, environment
- Location: Yeovil, Somerset, UK
- Region served: United Kingdom
- Key people: Peter Littlewood, Trust Director
- Employees: 3
- Website: betterplaneteducation.org.uk
- Formerly called: Young People's Trust for the Environment (YPTE), The Young People's Trust for the Environment & Nature Conservation.

Better Planet Education (formerly the Young People's Trust for the Environment) is a British charity, founded in 1982 to encourage young people's understanding of the environment. The charity's main goal is to give young people a real awareness of environmental issues such as climate change, pollution, deforestation, endangered flora and fauna, and sustainable development.

== Activity ==
Better Planet Education offers free learning resources via their website to assist teachers in educating young people about the environment and sustainability.

Better Planet Education provide free school talks to schools on environmental issues.

The trust has given various Parliamentary Receptions at the House of Commons in London, providing the opportunity for Members of Parliament to meet young people involved in the trust's work.

In 2011 the trust launched the ‘Roots to Green Living’ campaign. The scheme provided eight schools in the Bristol/Bath and NE Somerset area with regular support from a YPTE Education Officer, who worked with them over the course of three years to develop environmental education opportunities within the school grounds and help to embed environmental learning into the schools’ curricula.

== Awards ==
Better Planet Education run various awards for schools to enter and compete for prizes.

=== The Total Green School Awards ===
The annual Total Green School Awards are an award for excellence in environmental education, open to primary schools in England, Scotland and Wales, and sponsored by Total. It involves over 45,000 children and offers the chance for primary schools to win £5,000. The awards are given to schools that have a created an outstanding educational piece of work about the environment.

In 2011, Total Gas & Power won the 'Community Initiative of the Year' award at the Utility Industry Achievement Awards, held at London's Grosvenor House Hotel, for their involvement in the Total Green School Award.

The National Award Ceremony for 2013 was held at the Science Museum in London on 20 June 2013. Normanton on Soar Primary School were named UK champions and were presented with their prize by The Right Honourable Kenneth Clarke QC MP and BBC celebrity Darregh Mortell.

==== Winners by year ====
The Total Green School Awards have been running since 2007. As well as the overall champions (listed below) each year recognises a regional champion from one of the four UK regions and the four winning schools in each region.

Year	Winning School	Winning Entry
2014	Ollaberry Primary School - Ollaberry, Shetland	Tommy Turtle's Terrible Day
2013	Normanton on Soar Primary School - Normanton on Soar	NOS and Africa get creative!
2012	English Martyrs' Catholic Primary School - Long Eaton	From Long Eaton to Japan
2011	Castle Park Primary School - Caldicot	Madagascar
2010	Pilling St John's CE Primary School - Pilling, Preston	The Pilling Coral Reef
2009	Lutley Primary School - Halesowen	Our Super School Grounds
2008	Banchory Primary School - Aberdeenshire	Bags in Banchory
2007	Pilling St John's CE Primary School - Pilling, Lancashire	Power and Potatoes

=== Have Your Say on Sustainability ===
The Have Your Say on Sustainability award, is an Environmental film-making competition. In partnership with Eurostar the competition invites 11- to 18-year-olds to create a short video clip sharing their views on the environment. Five winners travel to the European Parliament in Brussels to air their views in front of an audience of MEPs. they also receive vouchers worth £250 for their school to spend on technological equipment. The overall winner wins a three-day stay for four at Disneyland Paris.

=== BT Young Naturalist of the Year Awards ===
From 1993 to 1997, as Young People's Trust for the Environment, the organisation ran the Young Naturalist of the Year Awards in conjunction with BT to encourage children aged 8–13 to carry out research on anything from insects to elephants, nature trails to rain forests and acid rain to global warming. Winners received a dolphin trophy and £500 for their school.

== Funding ==
Better Planet Education is largely dependent on funding from corporates and grant-making trusts. Past and present sponsors include:

- Eurostar
- Total Gas & Power
- Iona Capital
- Barclaycard
- The Millennium Commission
- Garfield Weston Foundation
- BT

== Notable trustees, patrons, and supporters ==
- Steve Backshall
- John Craven
- Dermot O'Leary
- David Bellamy
- Zoë Wanamaker
- Michael Aspel
- Dan Byles MP
- Naomi Wilkinson
- Jessica Morden MP
- Bob Holness
- Cel Spellman

== See also ==
- Teach the Future
