= Havakazoo =

British children's television series

- Created by: Rosalind Farrimond
- Starring: Gabrielle Bradshaw (1997–1998); Vo Fletcher (1997); Jason Maverick (1997–1998); Naomi Wilkinson (1999–2002); Andy Ford (1999–2002)
- Voices of: Marcus Clarke; Helena Smee
- Country of origin: United Kingdom

Production
- Running time: 25 minutes

Original release
- Network: Channel Five (Milkshake!)
- Release: 31 March 1997 – 2002

Havakazoo is a British pre-school television series which aired on Channel 5's Milkshake strand. It was the first original children's program to air when it launched in 1997.

== Set up ==
Originally, Havakazoo was created as a flagship show for Channel 5's children's programming strand, Milkshake!. It was the first original show to air in 1997 when the channel launched. Folk musician Vo Fletcher was approached to write a number of songs after his successful children's album 'Spaceman Sid'. At this time, the producers had not come up with a name for the new series. One of the tracks on his album was called 'Havakazoo' so it was decided that would be its title. The song was then shortened and altered to fit with the show.

The show's main character was a robot-style clothes dryer called Messy. Each programme was presented by Gabrielle Bradshaw and Jason Maverick and followed a broad theme that consisted of songs, stories and activities with the two main presenters in the studio. A short clip from the outside world was introduced into each show. The presenters would frequently invite the younger viewers to participate at home by showing them how to make something. They signed off at the end of episodes by each saying, "Havakazoo".

The series aired on weekday mornings. A half-hour episode also aired on weekends with the character Messy acting as a mascot introducing a selection of shows from the strand, telling jokes, answering questions and showing drawings sent in by viewers of any Havakazoo or non-Havakazoo characters with Vo playing with his guitar in the background in each link. This was later dropped in series two when sister show Tickle, Patch and Friends aired in 1999.

From the second series, the show centred around a puppet dog called 'Watch Dog'. Messy was reintroduced with the format staying almost the same. A segment showing a cartoon style camcorder called 'Nosey' was introduced to show clips from the outside world as to how things worked (e.g. a steam train or a washing machine), how things were made (e.g. pre-packaged sandwiches or bread) or children doing activities (eg. making junk puppets or going on a riverboat trip). Nosey later became a separate show altogether.

From series three, the show was revamped. Many changes were made. Each episode now centred on the characters 'Patrica' and 'Patrick', played by Naomi Wilkinson and Andy Ford, who were two bakers who lived inside the windmill and both also acted as presenters. All of the characters from the second series returned and new characters were introduced. Songs, games, poems and stories, as well as regular craft activities still featured throughout. However, the show created a more comedy aspect to its overall feel. Two new puppet characters were also added. A female dog, Watchdog's younger niece called 'Plum' and the fleas 'Tick and Tock' who lived inside Watch Dog's fur, without his knowledge.

Gabrielle Bradshaw and Jason Maverick presented as themselves for the first two series. From 1999, Milkshake! presenter, Naomi Wilkinson was introduced as "Patrica" and comedian and pantomime actor Andy Ford as Patrick the baker. Vo Fletcher appeared regularly with his guitar in series One having also written the title music for the show.

All puppets were created by Hands Up Puppets.

== Characters ==
- Messy (voiced by Joe Grecco) – A robot-like spin dryer made out of unused things.
- Watchdog (Series Two) – A dog who would often keep an eye on the time and a look out from the window. He first appeared in the second series.
- Tick and Tock (Series Three) – Two fleas who lived inside Watchdog's fur and told jokes. They were first seen from the third series onwards.
- Vo Fletcher (Series One) – Played himself. An artist who performed songs.
- Gabrielle (Series One and Two) – Presenter, herself
- Jason (Series One and Two) – Presenter, himself
- Plum (Series Three) – Watchdog's niece. A young female dog who delivers bread baked in the windmill. She first appears in the third series.
- Patrica (Series Three; played by Naomi Wilkinson) – Works at the windmill and acts as a presenter. She first appears in the third series.
- Patrick (Series Three; played by Andy Ford) – Works at the windmill as a baker and acts as a presenter. He first appears in the third series.

== Episodes ==
1. Unknown Episode (Plot: "Everything turns yellow". It is unknown what this episode is called.)
2. Creepy Crawlies
3. Unknown Episode (Plot: "Watchdog plays a Weather tune". It is unknown what this episode is called.)
4. Unknown Episode (Plot: "Messy collects things that come in pairs, including two bears". It is unknown what this episode is called.)
5. Unknown Episode (Plot: " Some unusually large footprints are found in Havakazoo". It is unknown what this episode is called.)
6. Unknown Episode (Plot: "Messy wants to be invisible". It is unknown what this episode is called.)
7. Unknown Episode (Plot: "Jason gets in the way". It is unknown what this episode is called.)
8. Unknown Episode (Plot: "The gang play snap". It is unknown what this episode is called.)
9. Unknown Episode (Plot: "Jason wants to be an inventor". It is unknown what this episode is called.)
10. Unknown Episode (Plot: "Plum finds out about opticians when Patricia explains what they do". It is unknown what this episode is called.)
11. Unknown Episode (Plot: "Patricia makes skittles, while Tick and Tock use a crumb as a bowling ball". It is unknown what this episode is called. )
12. Unknown Episode (Plot: "Plum doesn't realise the sound of bells ringing is coming from an ice-cream van". It is unknown what this episode is called.)
13. Unknown Episode (Plot: "Patricia makes a camera and Plum has her photo taken". It is unknown what this episode is called.)
14. Unknown Episode (Plot: "The bakery is short of milk". It is unknown what this episode is called.)
15. Unknown Episode (Plot: "Plum delivers a delicious cake to the school football team". It is unknown what this episode is called.)
16. Unknown Episode (Plot: "Patrick performs a magic show in the bakery and . Patricia sings a song". It is unknown what this episode is called.)
