= Gibraltar: Britain in the Sun =

- Genre: Docu-Soap, Fly-on-the-wall
- Narrated by: Timothy Spall
- Opening theme: Alleys of Buenos Aires
- Country of origin: United Kingdom
- Original language: English
- No. of series: 3
- No. of episodes: 15

Production
- Production location: Gibraltar
- Running time: 43–45 minutes

Original release
- Network: Channel 5
- Release: 11 June 2013 – present

Gibraltar: Britain in the Sun is a British documentary broadcast on Channel 5 in the United Kingdom. It first broadcast on 11 June 2013 and series one ended on 16 July 2013. The programme experienced higher than average and expected ratings, peaking just below 1.90 million viewers on most episodes. It returned for a second series which began on 7 January 2014, and the series finished 11 February 2014. The third series began on 5 November 2014. In 2021, the series was repeated by Channel 5 at 4 pm weekdays with the title amended to Bargain Brits in the Sun as to fit in with Channel 5's Bargain-Loving Brits holiday series from Benidorm and the Costa del Sol, which would be scheduled to run in the same slot once the Gibraltar series had ended.

== Summary ==
The programme follows the lives of many British expatriates who now reside in the territory and some Gibraltarians. Filming took place in June 2012, when Gibraltar Airport's new terminal was officially opened by Prince Edward, Earl of Wessex and Sophie, Countess of Wessex. The opening was seen on the programme however the Royal visit was not.
