= Mofy =

Japanese children's TV series

- Genre: Children's television series Musical; Stop-motion
- Created by: Aki Kondo
- Opening theme: "We Can Do It If We Try"
- Countries of origin: Japan; Italy
- Original language: English
- No. of seasons: 2

Production
- Running time: 4–5 minutes
- Production companies: Associati Audiovisivi; Sony Creative Products; Rai Fiction; ZDF Enterprises (Series 2)

Original release
- Network: Rai 2 and Rai YoYo (Italy); NHK (Japan); Milkshake! (UK, formerly)
- Release: June 30, 2013 – present

Mofy is a stop-motion animated children's television series of shorts. The series is a co-production between Associati Audiovisivi (with their animation brand Misseri Studio) and Sony Creative Products in collaboration with Rai Fiction. ZDF Enterprises joined as co-producer in Series 2.

The series is based on the characters of the picture books created by the Japanese illustrator Aki Kondo, published in 2008.

== Premise ==
The series represents stop-motion designs made of cotton, featuring a white bunny named Mofy. She goes on daily adventures to help her to understand and cope with her emotions.

== Merchandising ==
Takehiko Ohya, the manager of Global Business Group Licensing and Sony Creative Products stated,

With an established appeal in a number of kawaii markets, not to mention excellent ratings on one of the UK's most popular children's programming strands, the time is right to announce the expansion of Mofy's presence in Europe – and where better to do so than at BLE? We look forward to meeting potential partners at BLE and telling them more about this uniquely appealing property.

The merchandise has included apps, books and magazines, sticker books, digital publications, and a range of children's items, including plushes, stationery, school items, bedding, bags and purses, personal care items, DVDs, apparel, activity books, games, puzzles, toys, and accessories. Merchandise was promoted through magazines, shopping malls, celebrities, and retail corners, as well as with popular Mofy-themed live appearances, special events, and even exhibitions. This success has recently been expanded to international marketplaces.

== Broadcast ==
The series is shown on several TV channels worldwide, among them: On Rai 2 and Rai YoYo in Italy, on NHK in Japan, on KiKA in Germany and Austria, in Channel 5's preschool block, Milkshake! in the United Kingdom, on Australian Broadcasting Company's ABC Kids in Australia, Jeem TV in Arabia, Azteca 7 in Mexico, Kuwait Television in Kuwait and Channel 12 (Israel) in Israel. NBCUniversal's Universal Kids acquired the series in the United States ran as the channel's shorts on May 20, 2019. In the United States, the show was available on the Nick Jr. Channel's Noggin video subscription service app from 2016 to 2018.
