= Milkshake! =

British television block for children, broadcast on Channel 5

- Logo used since 2017
- Network: 5; 5Star (2006–2011, 2017–2018); 5 (streaming service)
- Launched: 31 March 1997; 29 years ago
- Country of origin: United Kingdom
- Owner: Paramount Networks UK & Australia
- Headquarters: London
- Sister network: 5; 5Star; 5USA; 5Drama; 5Action
- Original language: English
- Official website: www.milkshake.tv

Milkshake! (stylised as milkshake!) is a British children's television programming block on Channel 5. Originally launched in 1997, it is currently aimed at children aged 2 to 7 and typically broadcasts from early morning till late morning.

The block features a mix of original UK series and imported shows, primarily from Australia, Canada, and the United States. Over the years, Milkshake! has included popular programmes such as Peppa Pig, Thomas & Friends, and Fireman Sam.

It has been produced by various entities, including Channel 5 and, formerly, the BBC and Fremantle. The block continues to be a key part of Channel 5’s children’s programming.

== History ==
Logo used from 2005 to 2017

Milkshake! originally launched on Channel 5 in 1997, originally airing for an hour and a half every day. The block currently broadcasts on weekdays from 05:40 am to 09:15 am and weekends from 5:40 am to 9:55 am (9:50 am on Sundays). It features programmes and content intended for young children, and features continuity links led by a team of presenters.

While the block has always focused on the pre-school market, programmes for older children had also aired for a time before being split off into a standalone block called Shake!, which, in its time, ran on weekends after Milkshake!. The block was discontinued in May 2007 but was briefly revived in 2009.

On 16 October 2006, with the launch of Five Life, Milkshake! began broadcasting on the then-new digital channel, airing from 6:00 am to 12:00 pm. By the time the channel rebranded as 5* (later 5Star), the channel reduced its broadcast hours and removed the Milkshake! block, although it did briefly return for a short time in 2017 as part of the branding refresh.

In November 2008, Channel 5 announced plans to launch a stand-alone Milkshake! digital network; however, these plans did not come to fruition.

Following Viacom's acquisition of Channel 5 in 2014, the block became the free-TV home for Nick Jr. programmes including Paw Patrol, Blaze and the Monster Machines, and Shimmer and Shine.

On 6 July 2017, Channel 5 announced a rebranding of Milkshake! that launched on 24 July, including updated branding, a new studio, new shows, new presenters, and the launch of a YouTube channel that would feature digital content related to the block.

In March 2025, a Milkshake! branded FAST channel was added to the 5 streaming service. This FAST channel would later launch on Freely in July 2026.

== Programming ==
=== Current programming ===
- The Adventures of Paddington
- Ben & Holly's Little Kingdom
- Brave Bunnies
- Cooking with the Gills
- Daisy and Ollie
- Fireman Sam
- Go Green With The Grimwades
- Kangaroo Beach
- Meet the Experts
- Meet the Hedgehogs
- Milkshake! Monkey
- Milkshake! Story Den
- Milkshake! Summer Fun
- Mimi's World
- MixMups
- Odo
- Oggy Oggy
- Peppa Pig
- Pip and Posy
- Pop Paper City
- Reu and Harper's Wonder World
- Show Me How
- Sunny Bunnies
- The World According to Grandpa
- Thomas & Friends
- Tim Rex in Space
- Tweedy and Fluff

==== Programming from Nick Jr. (U.S.) ====
- Abby Hatcher
- Baby Shark's Big Show!
- Blaze and the Monster Machines
- Blue's Clues & You!
- Bubble Guppies
- Dora the Explorer (season 7 only)
- Dora
- Paw Patrol
- Rubble & Crew
- Rusty Rivets (2017–2019)
- Ryan's Mystery Playdate (2020)
- Santiago of the Seas
- Shimmer and Shine
- The Smurfs
- Sunny Day (2019–2020)
- Top Wing

==== Other acquired programming ====
- Chip and Potato
- Mecha Builders
- Milo
- Noddy, Toyland Detective
- Ricky Zoom
- Thomas & Friends: All Engines Go

=== Former programming ===
- The Adventures of Sinbad
- The Adventures of the Bush Patrol
- Angels of Jarm (2007-2017)
- Anytime Tales
- Atlantis High
- Audrey and Friends (2002)
- Aussie Antics
- Batman: The Brave and the Bold
- Beachcomber Bay
- The Beeps (2007–2015)
- The Beginner's Bible
- Beyblade
- Big School (2007–2013)
- Bird Bath
- Blue Water High
- Bob the Builder (2015-2021) (now on ITVX)
- Boyz and Girlz
- Braceface
- Butterbean's Café
- Castle Farm (2010–2014)
- Circle Square
- City of Friends
- Collecting Things
- Cowboyz and Cowgirlz
- Dan Dare: Pilot of the Future
- Dappledown Farm (1997-2004)
- The Day Henry Met…
- Deepwater Black
- Demolition Dad
- Dig & Dug with Daisy
- Don't Blame the Koalas
- Dora and Friends: Into the City!
- Dragon Booster
- Duel Masters
- Enchanted Tales
- The Enid Blyton Adventure Series
- Eric Carle Stories
- Family!
- Fat Dog Mendoza
- Floogals
- Funky Town
- Funky Valley
- Gadget & the Gadgetinis
- Gerald McBoing-Boing (2005–2016)
- Gigglebug
- Groundling Marsh
- Hana's Helpline
- Havakazoo
- Igam Ogam
- Insect Antics
- James the Cat (1998 series)
- KaBlam!
- Kid-E-Cats
- Klootz
- Land of the Lost
- Lassie
- Lily's Driftwood Bay (2015–2017) (now on ITVX)
- The Littl' Bits
- Little Antics
- Little Lodgers (2007-2016)
- Little Princess
- Loggerheads
- Looney Tunes
- Luo Bao Bei
- Max Steel
- MechaNick
- Mega Babies
- The Milky and Shake Show (2008–2011)
- Milkshake! Bop Box (2009–2020)
- Milkshake! Bopping About (2017–?)
- A Milkshake! Christmas
- Milkshake! Festive Fun
- Milkshake! Music Box
- Milkshake! Bop Box Boogie (2020–2021)
- The Milkshake! Show (2007–2016)
- Milkshake! Show Songs
- A Milkshake! Summer
- Mirror, Mirror
- Mist: Sheepdog Tales (2007–2015)
- Monkey Makes
- Mofy
- Mya Go
- Nella the Princess Knight (2017–2020)
- Olivia
- Oswald (2002–2009)
- Pirata and Capitano
- The Secret Life of Kittens
- Slugterra
- Snobs
- Softies
- Shane the Chef
- Stickin' Around
- Strange Dawn
- ThunderCats
- TREX
- The Tribe
- True Jackson, VP
- USA High
- Wanda and the Alien (2014–2018)
- What-a-Mess
- What Makes Me Happy
- When I Grow Up
- Why!
- Wil Cwac Cwac
- The Wind in the Willows
- Wissper
- Wizards of Waverly Place
- The Wonder Years
- Woolamaloo
- The WotWots (2009–2017)

==== Programming from Cartoon Network (U.S.) ====
- The Powerpuff Girls (1998 series)

==== Programming from Playhouse Disney (U.S.) ====
- Bear in the Big Blue House (2000–2007)
- The Book of Pooh (2002–2008)

==== Other acquired programming ====
- A House That's Just Like Yours
- Abby's Flying Fairy School (2010–2015)
- Adventures from the Book of Virtues
- The Adventures of Bottle Top Bill and His Best Friend Corky
- Alvin and the Chipmunks
- Animal Antics
- Animal Express
- Animal Families
- Animal Xtremes
- Babar
- Bananas in Pyjamas (2012–2017)
- Beast Wars: Transformers
- Becca's Bunch
- Chloe's Closet (2012–2017) (now on ITVX)
- Chiro and Friends (2008–2013)
- Digby Dragon
- Ebb and Flo
- Fifi and the Flowertots (2005–2014)
- Franklin (2002–2009)
- Harry and His Bucket Full of Dinosaurs (2005–2014)
- Havakazoo
- Hi-5 (2002–mid late 2008)
- James the Cat
- Jane and the Dragon
- Jelly Jamm (2012–2016)
- LazyTown (2013–2016)
- Maple Town
- Mio Mao (2004–2017)
- Miss Spider's Sunny Patch Friends
- The Mr. Men Show
- Mr. Men and Little Miss
- Muppet Babies
- Noddy in Toyland (2009–2021)
- Nosey
- Number Adventures
- Old Bear Stories
- Olive the Ostrich
- Olly the Little White Van (2011–2018)
- PB Bear and Friends
- Pets!
- Pip Ahoy! (2014–2018) (now on ITVX)
- Pingu (2017–2018) (now on Sky Kids)
- Play!
- Plonsters
- Pocoyo (2005–2011)
- Poko
- Poppy Cat (2017–2018)
- Postman Pat (2000–2009) (now on CBeebies)
- Popular
- Power Rangers
- Power Rangers Megaforce
- Power Rangers Samurai
- Puffin Rock (now on CBeebies)
- Roary the Racing Car (2007–2018)
- Rolie Polie Olie (2002–2008)
- Roobarb/Roobarb and Custard Too (2005–2013, 2016)
- Rupert Bear, Follow the Magic...
- Sailor Sid
- Sandy and Mr. Flapper
- The Save-Ums! (2003–2015)
- Say it with Noddy (2005–2009)
- Seaside Antics
- Secret Life of Toys
- The Secret of Eel Island
- The Shoe People
- Simon
- The Singing Kettle (2001–2005)
- Singled Out
- Sister Said
- Tickety Toc (now on Sky Kids)
- Tickle, Patch and Friends
- Tiger, Tiger
- Titch
- Toby's Travelling Circus
- Toot the Tiny Tugboat
- The Treacle People
- The World of Peter Rabbit and Friends
- Zack and Quack

==== Programming originally produced for or aired on PBS Kids ====
- Angelina Ballerina: The Next Steps (2011–2017)
- Barney & Friends (2002–2007)
- Bert and Ernie's Great Adventures (2008–2015)
- Elmo's World (2002–2012)
- Franny's Feet (2003–2009)
- George Shrinks (2005-2011)
- Jay Jay the Jet Plane (2002–2009)
- Make Way for Noddy (2002–2016)
- Wimzie's House

== Notable presenters ==
In-vision continuity presenters have been utilised by Milkshake! since the show began on 31 March 1997. The original presenters were Lucy Alexander and Konnie Huq. Huq was replaced by former Nickelodeon presenter Eddie Mathews when she left the show to join the BBC as a Blue Peter presenter. The longest-serving presenter is Kemi Majeks, who has presented the block for over 26 years. Relief and freelance presenters have also anchored Milkshake! continuity links, including presenter Ellie Harrison and deaf presenter Gary Evans. After Beth Evans & Naomi Wilkinson left in 2010, they continued to do British Sign Language interpretation for the other hosts until August 2011. Evans made 1 more appearance in a pre-recorded "Handshake" segment on the Milkshake! website in 2012.

== List of presenters ==
- Amy Thompson (2009–2023)
- Andrew McEwan (2006–2007)
- Anna Williamson (1997–2005)
- Beth Evans (2003–2010)
- Casey-Lee Jolleys (1997–2000)
- Curtis Angus (2014–2017)
- Dave Payne (2007–2009)
- David Ribi (2017–present)
- Derek Moran (2007–present)
- Eddie Mathews (1997–2002)
- Gary Evans (2008–2009)
- Hannah Williams (2006–2009)
- Harley Bird as Peppa Pig (2013–2020)
- Helena Smee as Milkshake Monkey (2009–present)
- Jen Pringle (2006–present)
- Jodie Penfold (2001)
- Kemi Majeks (1999–present)
- Kiera-Nicole Brennan (2017–present)
- Konnie Huq (1997–2000)
- Lucy Alexander (1997–2000)
- Naomi Wilkinson (2000–2010)
- Nathan Connor (2017–2023)
- Olivia Birchenough (2012–present)
- Sita Thomas (2015–2023)
