= Shake! =

British television programming block

- Network: 5
- Launched: 2000; 26 years ago
- Closed: 2011; 15 years ago
- Division of: Milkshake!
- Country of origin: United Kingdom
- Headquarters: London
- Formerly known as: The Core (2000); Milkshake FM (2002); NGA (2003–2005)
- Original language: English

Shake! (formerly NGA, The Core, and Milkshake FM) was a television programming block shown by United Kingdom broadcaster Channel 5, airing animated and live-action programmes.

== History ==
Shake! logo (2002–2005).

In 1997, Channel 5 launched a 'youth' strand which broadcast on weekends between 11:00 am-12:00 pm and 4.30 pm-6:00 pm on Saturdays, and 11 am to 1 pm on Sundays. It was intended for older children than Milkshake! was, and was presented by Kate McIntyre in vision. Nick Wilson, Channel 5 programme controller for children's and religious programming, said it was a deliberate decision not to give the strand a name, like Channel 4's T4, stating: "Once you get past 13, the last thing you want is to be put into your own zone or slot." The strand had its own on-air look from The Design Clinic, which included six new cartoon characters described as "a cross between South Park and the Mr. Men" that will unexpectedly bounce around on McIntyre during the continuity breaks.

In 2000, the block officially gained its own identity and umbrella branding as The Core, and began airing exclusively on Saturday afternoons. Its identity was given following the earlier demise in 1999 of the Josie d'Arby-hosted weekend afternoon teen series The Mag, which left a blank state for the original strand. Many originally commissioned programs were created for the block, such as Harry and Cosh, Audrey and Friends and Atlantis High, alongside acquired programmes.

In January 2002, following Channel 5's branding refresh, The Core was renamed to Milkshake FM, taking its name from the established Channel 5 preschool-age slot Milkshake!. Its broadcast hours were moved to the mid-morning, now airing from 9:00 am to 12:00 pm. When Channel 5 rebranded as Five in September, the block's name was changed again to Shake!.

On 21 March 2007, Five announced that all children's programmes on the network would be consolidated under the Milkshake! block, and that Shake! would be dropped by the end of the month, with Milkshake! taking over a portion of its timeslot on weekends, while dramas aimed towards a young audience would fulfill the rest of the former slot.

On 24 September 2009, Five announced that they would revive Shake! under a strategic sponsorship with Disney. The revamped block would feature programming such as Hannah Montana and Wizards of Waverly Place, alongside reruns of Snobs and The Tribe from the original incarnation of the block. Milkshake! presenter Jen Pringle would present the revived block, which would air on Sundays. By Mid-2010, Shake! was given a branding refresh and began airing Nickelodeon programmes such as iCarly and True Jackson, VP in place of the Disney shows.

Since 2011, Channel 5 has not branded shows aimed at older viewers under a standalone block, simply airing them under the main Channel 5 name.

== Presenters ==
- Kate McIntyre (1997–2002)
- Marc Crumpton (2001–2002)
- Dave Payne (2005–2007)
- Jen Pringle (2009–2010)
- Kemi Majeks (2002-2005)
