= Tickle, Patch and Friends =

British children's television series

- Country of origin: United Kingdom
- Original language: English
- No. of series: 11

Production
- Running time: 25 minutes
- Production companies: Ed Matthews in-house C5 (Series 1 to 9) Two Hand Productions (Series 10 and 11 only)

Original release
- Network: Channel 5/Milkshake!
- Release: 28 August 1999 – 26 June 2005

Tickle, Patch and Friends is a BAFTA award-winning television series for children. The series was produced in-house by Ed Matthews for the British television network Channel 5, and was originally broadcast on the channel's children's programming block Milkshake!, running from 28 August 1999 to 26 June 2005.

== Plot ==
Tickle, Patch and Friends features the misadventures of two puppet guinea pigs named Tickle and Patch, voiced and puppeteered by Marcus Clarke and Helena Smee. Each episode would see the pair taking on a job to make money. The show featured crossover appearances from Channel 5's other children's programming. The show was filmed at a variety of locations, such as zoos, beaches, churches, schools and farms, and around the Central London area.

Some of the shows and cartoons shown on Tickle, Patch and Friends included PB Bear and Friends, Plonsters, Animal Antics, and Mr. Men and Little Miss. These other shows also aired on Milkshake!.

=== Other characters ===
- Pipsqueak – A baby guinea pig who was introduced to the show in late 2002.
- 37 Bear – A taxi-driving bear.
- Thing – A large insect of unknown origin.
- Alien – A fleece alien puppet.

=== Features ===
- The Picture Gallery (later changed to The Farmyard Gallery in the later series) – Tickle and Patch look at viewers' drawings.
- Patch FM – Tickle and Patch play at being disc jockeys and talk to viewers on their video phone and answer frequently asked questions from them.
- Joke Time – Tickle and Patch read out viewers' jokes on location (e.g. outside a theme park) and they usually laugh at them so much, their socks or pants blow off for extra laughs.
- Tickle's Quiz – Featured in the later series where Tickle stays in the barn while taking shelter from the rain, and asks the audience a simple question involving what sound does a farm animal or vehicle make.

=== Programmes featured as part of Tickle, Patch and Friends ===
- Mr Men and Little Miss
- Plonsters
- PB Bear and Friends
- Animal Antics
- When I Grow Up
- Little Antics
- Nosey
- James the Cat
- Animal Express
- Monkey Makes
- Why
- Insect Antics
- Klootz
- Mio Mao
- Sailor Sid
- Softies
- Aussie Antics
- Bird Bath
- Funky Valley
- Funky Town

== In other media ==
- During the early 2000s, Tickle and Patch were sometimes accompanied by the Milkshake! presenters in additional spin-off programmes and features in continuity links.
- Outtakes from the show were featured on various episodes of It'll Be Alright on the Night.
- In 2020, Patch auditioned for Britain's Got Talent as a comedian, but got buzzed off after one joke and received four no's.
