= Jen Pringle =

English television presenter (born 1983)

Jennifer Pringle (born 1983, in York) is an English television presenter and actress. Pringle was born in York, and grew up in Scunthorpe. She attended Salford University, studying media and performance.

Pringle is a continuity presenter on Milkshake!, the early morning programming block for young children, and formerly on Shake!, the weekend morning block for older children, on Channel 5. Pringle joined Milkshake! in July 2006. She joined Shake! on 4 October 2009.

Pringle also voices characters in the television shows Angelina Ballerina, Ben and Holly's Little Kingdom and Peppa Pig.
