= Tweedy and Fluff =

British television series

- Created by: Corrinne Averiss
- Written by: Corrinne Averiss
- Directed by: Chris Randall
- Voices of: Nina Wadia
- Composers: Beth Porter; Ben Please
- Country of origin: United Kingdom
- No. of seasons: 1
- No. of episodes: 40

Production
- Running time: 5 minutes per episode (approx.)
- Production companies: Second Home Studios; Stitchy Feet Ltd.

Original release
- Network: 5 (United Kingdom)
- Release: 16 November 2023

Tweedy and Fluff is a children's stop motion animated series created by Corrinne Averiss. The series features short stories revolving around Tweedy, a handmade plush toy, and Fluff, a ball of fuzz/lint.

== Production ==
The series is directed by Chris Randall, and is produced at Second Home Studios, in collaboration with Averiss' Stitchy Feet Ltd. based in Birmingham.

== Broadcast history ==
The series began airing daily on 5’s Milkshake! programming block.

== Awards ==
- Japan Prize 2025: Award of Honour in the Preschool Division.
- Voice of the Listener and Viewer (VLV) Awards 2025: Won Best Children's Programme.
- RTS Midlands Awards 2024: Best Animated Series, Breakthrough (Off Screen - Scripted), and Craft Production.
- BAFTA TV Awards 2025: Nominated for Best Children's Scripted Show.
