= UK Raw! =

British sex talk show

- Genre: Talk show Factual television
- Presented by: Trevor Ward; Tanya Broome
- Country of origin: United Kingdom
- Original language: English
- No. of seasons: 2
- No. of episodes: 17

Production
- Producer: Roger Beam
- Running time: 23
- Production company: R.B. Television Productions

Original release
- Network: Channel 5
- Release: 17 February – 11 November 1999

UK Raw! is a late-night studio show, concerning real people and their fetishes.

It is co-presented by Tanya Broome and Trevor Ward.

It was produced by Roger Beam and his company R.B. Television Productions for Channel 5.

It was first broadcast by Channel 5 on 17 February 1999.

Trevor also presented other late night Channel 5 shows of the late 1990s to early 2000s, which are similar to UK Raw! such as European Blue Review and X Certificate.

== Premise ==
Each episode contains 4 short films about things like sex, fetishism, bondage, sadomasochism, witchcraft, the paranormal, the supernatural etc and other weird subjects, which are separated into 4 segments throughout the show. Those short films are shown to an audience who comment on what they've just seen, in between each showing. Trevor and Tanya question not only the audience members for their opinions on those short films and their own personal lives, but they also interview some of the people who appeared in those short films. The show then ends with a weird act from one of those short films.
