= NFL UK =

- Starring: Trevor Nelson; Natalie Pinkham
- Country of origin: United Kingdom

Production
- Running time: 60 minutes

Original release
- Network: Five
- Release: 2009

NFL UK was a television news programme based on the sport of American football. The show was broadcast in the United Kingdom on Five.

The show was hosted by Trevor Nelson and Natalie Pinkham with Nat Coombs as a reporter.
