= Myfanwy Talog =

Welsh actress (1944–1995)

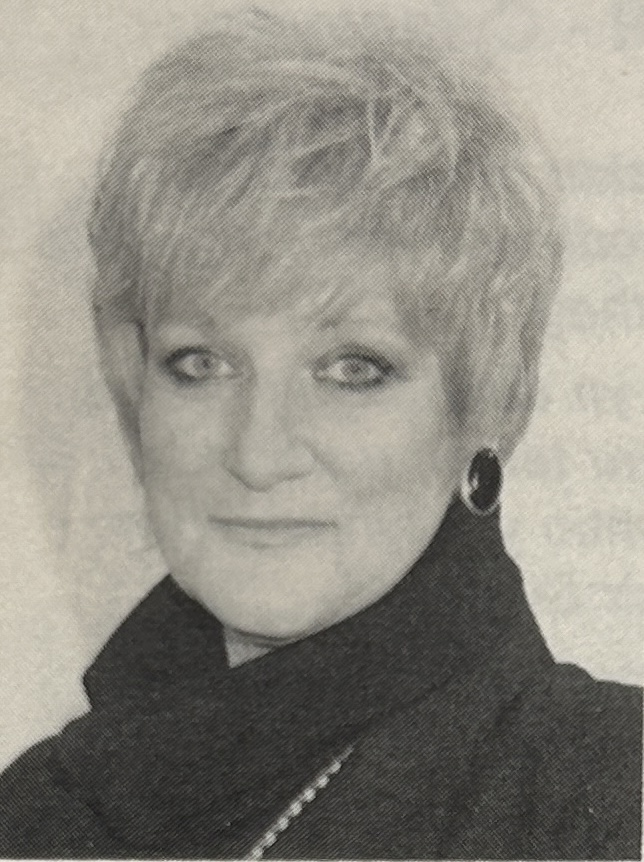
- Born: Myfanwy Talog Williams; 31 March 1944; Caerwys, Flintshire, Wales
- Died: 11 March 1995 (aged 50); Buckinghamshire, England
- Resting place: Ss. Peter and Paul Churchyard, Ellesborough, Buckinghamshire, England
- Occupations: Actress; teacher
- Years active: 1971–1995
- Partner: David Jason (1977–1995)

Myfanwy Talog Williams (Welsh pronunciation: [məˈvanuɨ ˈtalɔɡ] 31 March 1944 – 11 March 1995), known professionally as Myfanwy Talog, was a Welsh actress and the long-term partner of English actor David Jason.

== Personal life ==
Talog was born on 31 March 1944 in Caerwys, Flintshire, and a plaque was added to the house where she was born. She worked as a teacher before pursuing an acting career and appeared mainly on Welsh-language television, comedy and children's programmes. For the Welsh audience, she played the character of Phyllis Doris, the family's teen daughter in the comedy series Ryan and Ronnie.

She later appeared in several English-language sitcoms and soap operas. She lived with David Jason, and accompanied him to Buckingham Palace in 1993 to receive his appointment as an OBE. She lived with him for eighteen years until her death from breast cancer.

== Television ==
On television, Talog narrated Wil Cwac Cwac (English: Will Quack Quack) and voiced The Two Girls in the SuperTed episode, "SuperTed and the Pothole Rescue" for S4C and Siriol Productions. She did voice work for Cosgrove Hall on Alias the Jester, and The BFG, where she voiced Mrs. Clonkers (with Jason voicing the BFG). Contrary to popular belief, she did not sing the theme tune to Danger Mouse. She also appeared in the British TV shows The Magnificent Evans, Bread, Ryan and Ronnie, Within These Walls, A Sharp Intake of Breath, Crossroads, Butterflies, Yes, Prime Minister and Waiting for God.

== Death ==
Talog died of breast cancer on 11 March 1995, aged 50. In 2006, on the anniversary of her birthday, a plaque was unveiled by her brother in her memory, placed on her former family home in Caerwys.
