= The Further Adventures of SuperTed =

American-British 1989 television series

- Opening titles
- Genre: Adventure; Comedy; Sci-fi
- Based on: SuperTed by Mike Young
- Developed by: David Edwards
- Directed by: Bob Alvarez; Paul Sommer; Mike Young (recording director: UK); Gordon Hunt (recording director: USA)
- Creative director: Ray Patterson
- Voices of: Derek Griffiths (British version); Jon Pertwee (British version); Melvyn Hayes; Victor Spinetti; Danny Cooksey; Tress MacNeille; Hamilton Camp; Pat Fraley; B.J. Ward; Frank Welker; Pat Musick; Marvin Kaplan
- Narrated by: Derek Griffiths (British version); Brian Mitchell (American version)
- Theme music composer: John Debney
- Composer: John Debney
- Countries of origin: United States; United Kingdom
- Original language: English
- No. of seasons: 1
- No. of episodes: 13

Production
- Executive producers: William Hanna; Joseph Barbera
- Producer: Charles Grosvenor
- Running time: 22 minutes
- Production companies: Hanna-Barbera Productions; Wang Film Productions; Siriol Animation; S4C

Original release
- Network: Broadcast syndication (U.S.); BBC1 and S4C (U.K.)
- Release: 31 January – 25 April 1989

The Further Adventures of SuperTed is an animated television series produced by Hanna-Barbera and Siriol Animation in association with S4C, and continues the adventures of SuperTed. Only 13 episodes were produced and originally broadcast on The Funtastic World of Hanna-Barbera in the United States starting on 31 January 1989.

== Production ==
The original SuperTed, created by Mike Young, became the first British cartoon series to be aired on The Disney Channel in the United States in 1984. Young moved to the United States to work on more animated series and in 1988, he created a SuperTed-sequel-type cartoon called Fantastic Max (originally based on the cartoon pilot Space Baby), which was produced by Hanna-Barbera, who decided to create a new series of SuperTed.

This new American version of the show takes on a more epic format, with Texas Pete, Bulk and Skeleton also joined by new villains. The theme song was replaced with a more American overture, and the show poked fun at all aspects of American culture, from the Grand Ole Opry to Star Wars. Only two of the original cast reprised their voice roles for this new series, with Victor Spinetti and Melvyn Hayes returning to voice Texas Pete and Skeleton. Unlike the original, the series used digital ink and paint.

In the United Kingdom, Mike Young and the BBC decided to re-record the series to use the original voices of Derek Griffiths for SuperTed and Jon Pertwee for Spotty, which also resulted in some minor script changes. The episodes were also split into two parts, thus creating 26 10-minute stories, which resulted in the series not being broadcast until January 1990 on the BBC. It was repeated again twice in 1992 and 1993.

== Characters ==
=== Protagonists ===
- SuperTed (voiced by Derek Griffiths in the UK version, Danny Cooksey in the US version) – A teddy bear who is the main character of the series and rescues all those who need help. He was thrown aside and kept in the storeroom of a toy factory before being brought to life by Spotty's cosmic dust, and was given special powers by Mother Nature.
- Spotty Man (voiced by Jon Pertwee in the UK version and Pat Fraley in the US version) – An alien dressed in a yellow jumpsuit patterned with green polka dots, who is SuperTed's best friend. He comes from the Planet Spot, bought SuperTed to life with his cosmic dust, and flies with SuperTed on every mission. He also likes a few things to be covered with spots as well. Among the things he hates includes being tied up by SuperTed (aka Terrible Ted), his traveling bag being carried away by biting ants, being locked up at Fort Knox by Texas Pete, being thrown into a Texas snake pit by Texas Pete and a haybail, having a couple being ice-danced by Pengy and Dr. Frost, looking good in stripes in a white tiger disguise and having his Spots stolen by Texas Pete. He is the second main character of the series.

=== Supporting characters ===
- Slim, Hoppy and Kitty (voiced by Danny Cooksey and Tress MacNeille) – The kids of Oklahoma whose animals won first pride in the rodeo prairie, but needed SuperTed's help when Texas Pete tried to ruin their bull-riding competition by using a radio-controlled bull. Their only appearances were in the episode "Texas Is Mine."
- Major Billy Bob (voiced by Danny Mann) – The owner of the Grand Ol' Opry who makes a singing star out of SuperTed by signing a contract (after watching him sing with Texas Pete and his friend, Coral) at the end of the episode "Phantom of the Grand Ol' Opry" (the only episode he features in).
- Billy (voiced by Robbie Lee) – A boy who needed SuperTed's help when his father, Dr. Livings, had been kidnapped by the Polka Dot tribe after the discovery of cave paintings in a cave in a primitive Brazilian rainforest. His only appearance was in the episode "Dot's Entertainment."
- The Space Beavers (voiced by Jerry Houser and Charlie Adler) – Two beavers who are very naughty and are allies with Dr. Frost and Pengy. They are greedy, and like to munch on trees. Formally, they do not like SuperTed and Spotty, but become good friends with them.
- Kiki (voiced by Georgi Irene) – A child with a pet whale (who she gave a good scrubbing) that got kidnapped by Texas Pete, Bulk and Skeleton to find sunken treasure and needed SuperTed's help to save it. After being rescued, she rewards SuperTed and Spotty with a couple of Spotty shells. She and her pet whale only appeared in the episode "The Mysticetae Mystery."
- Blotch (voiced by Billie Hayes) – Spotty's younger sister.
- Prince Rajeash (voiced by Danny Cooksey) – An Indian prince who can't make decisions. He has an uncle, Prince Pyjamarama, and a helper, Mufti. Prince Pyjamarama is not impressed with Rajeash's actions, and later, both he and Mufti betray Rajeash. Luckily, Rajeash's new friends, SuperTed and Spotty, help him, and in the end, Rajeash becomes a new raja after Prince Pyjamarama and Mufti flee to the water.

=== Villains ===
- Texas Pete (voiced by Victor Spinetti) – The principal antagonist of the series.
  - Bulk (voiced by Marvin Kaplan) – Texas Pete's overweight, idiotic henchman.
  - Skeleton (voiced by Melvyn Hayes) – Texas Pete's effeminate, nervous henchman.
- Polka Face (voiced by Howard Morris) – The Polka Dot Tribe leader who tries to sell his tribal lands. He reforms and vows to be a better man at the urging of SuperTed at the end of the episode "Dot's Entertainment."
- Bubbles the Clown (voiced by Frank Welker) – A career burglar from Planet Boffo who escapes prison and enlists Skeleton and Bulk for a heist.
- Sleepless Knight (voiced by Kenneth Mars) – A knight who gives people nightmares.
- Dr. Frost (voiced by Kenneth Mars) – A mad scientist who plots to free the world while manipulating the Space Beavers into helping in his plot.
  - Pengy (voiced by Charlie Adler) – Dr. Frost's penguin henchman.
- The Hairmongers – A group of aliens from the planet Fluffalot.
  - Julius Scissors – Co-leader of the Hairmongers.
  - Marcilia – Co-leader of the Hairmongers.
- The two spies from the enemy Striped Army
- Prince Pyjamarama (voiced by Frank Welker) – Prince Rajeash's uncle and the main antagonist of the episode "Ruse of the Raja." He and his helper Mufti become traitors to Prince Rajeash.
  - Mufti (voiced by Bob Arbogast) – Prince Pyjamarama's henchman.

== Episode list ==
No.	Title	Written by	US air date	UK air date (Part 1 / Part 2)
1	"Phantom of the Grand Ol' Opry"	Story by : Kelly Ward & Mark Young; Teleplay by : Samuel Warren Joseph	31 January 1989	8 January 1990 / 10 January 1990
SuperTed loses his memory in a rocket crash. Texas Pete calls him "Terrible Ted" and joins him up in his gang with Skeleton and Bulk. He ties up Spotty at a jewellery store (who follows tracks to the location), and starts to create music havoc with his song, "I'm A Big Deal", for his night at the Grand Ol' Opry (where Spotty brings Terrible Ted's memory back to SuperTed again with his cosmic dust).
2	"Dot's Entertainment"	Story by : Dean Stefan; Teleplay by : Dean Stefan	7 February 1989	15 January 1990 / 17 January 1990
Billy's father goes missing after discovering a cave paintings of the 'Polka Dot Tribe' in a Brazilian rainforest cave. He asks for help from SuperTed and Spotty (who were watching a carnival in the streets of Rio) to come to the rescue of his missing father. Spotty becomes the focus of some 'legendary' attraction when they get to the Polka Dots Village (to whom its leader, Polka Face, sells his tribal land to theme park developers, and becomes nice at the end). Special guest: Robbie Lee
3	"Knox Knox, Who's There?"	Story by : Kelly Ward & Mark Young; Teleplay by : Ken Knox	14 February 1989	22 January 1990 / 24 January 1990
Spotty's sister Blotch is in aid of Spotty and SuperTed's help to find Speckle the Hoparoo. Both SuperTed and Spotty fly to a couple of planets (a desert one and an arctic one) where Texas Pete and his henchmen Skeleton and Bulk (who kidnapped Speckle) find cosmic dust for a 'springing-to-life' gold rush at Fort Knox in Northern Kentucky. While all this is happening, SuperTed, Speckle and Spotty find a recipe to capture the villains (by tipping melted chocolate over Bulk, etc.) with a banjo.
4	"The Mysticetae Mystery"	Story by : Kelly Ward & Mark Young; Teleplay by : Kristina Mazzotti	21 February 1989	5 February 1990 / 7 February 1990
While SuperTed and Spotty enjoy a tropical holiday, Texas Pete and his minions, Bulk and Skeleton, salvage sunken treasure that a whale swallows, then capture a child named Kiki and her pet whale, who calls on the short-waves for SuperTed's help. Meanwhile, after Tex and his crew go scuba diving, SuperTed (who saw the collar that Tex put on the whale) and Spotty (who saw Kiki's lost charm bracelet on the boat) enlist the help of a couple of dolphins to go under the sea to save Kiki, stop Texas Pete stealing treasure, and set the whales free.
5	"Texas Is Mine!"	Story by : Kelly Ward & Mark Young; Teleplay by : Tom Spath	28 February 1989	12 February 1990 / 14 February 1990
Texas Pete steals the entire state of Texas and blasts it into space — the largest rancho in the galaxy! It's up to SuperTed and Spotty to get the Lone Star State back where it belongs.
6	"Sheepless Nights"	Kelly Ward & Mark Young	7 March 1989	26 February 1990 / 28 February 1990
SuperTed and Spotty travel to Lethargia where the children are all having the same scary nightmares. Ted enters their dreams to help. There, he confronts the dreaded Sleepless Knight, whose goal is to give children everywhere nightmares.
7	"We Got Nutninkhamun"	Story by : Joe Sandusky; Teleplay by : Joe Sandusky	14 March 1989	19 February 1990 / 21 February 1990
Texas Pete gets his hands on some cosmic dust and uses it to bring an ancient Egyptian mummy to life. The whole gang is then off to Egypt to make the mummy lead them to the secret treasure. Can SuperTed stop them before they steal priceless artifacts?
8	"Leave It to Space Beavers"	Story by : Kelly Ward & Mark Young; Teleplay by : Gary Greenfield	21 March 1989	12 March 1990 / 14 March 1990
A villain called Dr. Frost and his penguin henchman Pengy plan to destroy the world by freezing it while tricking the Space Beavers into eating the world's trees.
9	"Bubbles, Bubbles Everywhere"	Story by : John Bonaccorsi; Teleplay by : John Bonaccorsi	28 March 1989	29 January 1990 / 31 January 1990
After SuperTed declares Texas Pete Public Enemy No. 1, a clown villain called Bubbles steals Texas Pete's Public Enemy No. 1 title after a casino robbery, and becomes companion to Bulk and Skeleton in a scheme to rob a diamond museum. Texas Pete has a chat with SuperTed and Spotty to help him get rid of Bubbles and his dog in two big bubbles. SuperTed then rewards Texas Pete by being declaring him Public Enemy No. 33.
10	"Farewell My Lovely Spots"	Story by : Kelly Ward & Fred Kron; Teleplay by : Fred Kron	4 April 1989	19 March 1990 / 21 March 1990
Spotty's spots have been stolen, and it looks like Texas Pete is the culprit. Only a ransom of cosmic dust will get them back. In a brilliant bit of sleuthing, SuperTed discovers that it was the work of a Texas Pete look-alike all along!
11	"Ben-Fur"	Story by : Dean Stefan; Teleplay by : Dean Stefan	11 April 1989	26 March 1990 / 28 March 1990
SuperTed and Spotty journey to the "Kids Town Satellite". SuperTed recounts his adventures on the planet "Fluffalot", where he defeated the Hairmongers and their leaders, Julius Scissors and Marcilia, in a series of "Ben Hur"-like contests.
12	"Spotty Earns His Stripes"	Story by : Marion Wells & Kelly Ward; Teleplay by : Marion Wells	18 April 1989	2 April 1990 / 5 April 1990
Spotty gets drafted into the Spotted Army, and becomes the unsuspecting dupe of the two spies from the enemy Striped Army, who plan to invade the planet. Can SuperTed help his friend in time to fend off the invasion?
13	"Ruse of the Raja"	Story by : Marion Wells & Kelly Ward; Teleplay by : Marion Wells	25 April 1989	5 March 1990 / 7 March 1990
A young Indian prince asks SuperTed to help him be a better ruler. But the prince's evil uncle Prince Pyjamarama wants to snatch the kingdom with his helper, Mufti. Only SuperTed can foil his nasty plans.

== Home media ==
=== UK ===
Between 1990 and 1991, three VHS tapes were released by BBC Video, whereas the two episodes of the British dub on each of the VHS tapes were made into 20-minute stories. No DVD releases have surfaced to date, in either the United Kingdom or the United States.

VHS Name	Catalogue Number	Release Year	Episodes
The Further Adventures of SuperTed: "Phantom of the Grand Ol' Opry"	BBCV 4304	2 April 1990	"Phantom of the Grand Ol' Opry"; "Dots Entertainment"
The Further Adventures of SuperTed 2: "Knox Knox, Who's There?"	BBCV 4394	10 September 1990	"Knox Knox, Who's There?"; "Bubbles, Bubbles Everywhere!"
The Further Adventures of SuperTed 3: "'The Mysticetae Mystery"	BBCV 4635	1 July 1991	"The Mysticetae Mystery"; "Texas Is Mine"

=== US ===
On 26 July 1990, Hanna-Barbera Home Video released The Further Adventures of SuperTed: 'Leave it to Space Beavers' on VHS (UPC: 017951751035), featuring the episodes Knox Knox! who's There?, Phantom of the Grand Ole Opry, Leave it to Space Beavers and Ruse of the Raja.

== Cast ==
=== British main cast ===
- Derek Griffiths - SuperTed, Narrator
- Jon Pertwee - Spotty Man

=== American main cast ===
- Danny Cooksey - SuperTed, Slim and Hoppy (in "Texas is Mine"), Kids town boy (in "Ben-Fur"), Prince Rajeesh (in "Ruse of the Raja")
- Pat Fraley - Spotty Man
- Brian Mitchell - Narrator, Polka-Dot Elder (in "Dot's Entertainment")

=== British and American main cast ===
- Melvyn Hayes - Skeleton
- Marvin Kaplan - Bulk
- Victor Spinetti - Texas Pete
- Frank Welker - Prince Pyjamarama (in "Ruse of the Raja"), Bubbles the Clown (in "Bubbles, Bubbles Everywhere"), Pengy (in "Leave It to Space Beavers"), Pingu (in "Bubbles, Bubbles Everywhere")

==== Additional voices ====
- Charlie Adler - Wally the Beaver (in "Leave It to Space Beavers")
- Bob Arbogast - Mufti (in "Ruse of the Raja")
- René Auberjonois -
- George Ball -
- Hamilton Camp - Sparky the Dog (in "Bubbles, Bubbles Everywhere")
- Philip Clarke -
- Barry Dennen -
- Dick Erdman -
- Billie Hayes - Blotch (in "Knox Knox, Who's There?"), Slot Machine Owner (in "Bubbles, Bubbles Everywhere")
- Whitby Hertford -
- Georgi Irene - Kiki (in "The Mysticetae Mystery")
- Arte Johnson -
- Robbie Lee - Billy the Kid (in "Dot's Entertainment"), Plush the Kid (in "Ben-Fur")
- Tress MacNeille - Kitty the Cowpolk Kid and her mom (in "Texas Is Mine"), Texas Pete's Mom (in "Bubbles, Bubbles Everywhere")
- Danny Mann - Major Billy Bob (in "Phantom of the Grand Ol' Opry").
- Kenneth Mars - Dr. Frost (in "Leave It to Space Beavers"), Sleepless Knight (in "Sleepless Nights")
- Cindy McGee -
- Howard Morris - Polka Face (in "Dot's Entertainment")
- Pat Musick -
- Rob Paulsen - Dr. Livings (in "Dot's Entertainment")
- Ann Ryerson -
- B.J. Ward - Polka-Hontas (in "Dots Entertainment")
- James Widdoes -
- Patric Zimmerman -

== Crew ==
- Gordon Hunt - U.S. recording director
- Andrea Romano - Animation casting director
- Mike Young - Creator, UK recording director
- Kris Zimmerman - Talent co-ordinator
