= Mike Young (producer) =

Welsh-American Emmy and BAFTA Award-winning producer

- Born: Michael Emlyn Young; Barry, Vale of Glamorgan, Wales
- Occupations: Animation producer, writer and founder of Mike Young Productions
- Years active: 1980–present
- Known for: SuperTed
- Spouse: Liz Young

Michael Emlyn Young is a Welsh-American Emmy and BAFTA Award-winning producer. He is the founder of two animation companies in both the UK and America. His company in 2015 changed its name from Mike Young Productions to Splash Entertainment, which also is a majority owner of the AVOD network Kabillion.

== Biography ==
Young was born in Cwm, near Ebbw Vale, in the flat above a fish and chip shop owned by the family of actor Victor Spinetti, who would later go on to provide the voice of Mike's character, Texas Pete. He trained as a television producer, and while working as an advertising copywriter he met his wife Liz Young. After the pair married in the 1970s, Young's stepson Richard Finn (later head of post-production at MYP), was having trouble falling asleep. Young created stories about a teddy bear and Finn told his school friends the stories, which resulted in the SuperTed books, co-produced with Young. He first animated a series called Wil Cwac Cwac, and then created and animated SuperTed in 1978.

In 1981, Young, along with his wife, animator Dave Edwards and producer Robin Lyons, founded Siriol Productions. They approached the newly formed Welsh TV channel S4C and secured a commission to produce an animated series of SuperTed. Due to the success of the initial series, it was re-dubbed in English. A special edition was made for the Welsh Office which instructed children on the "dos" and "don'ts" of road safety. The series sold well in the UK, and was followed by the more ambitious Fantastic Max (with Hanna-Barbera) and Little Dracula (with Steven Hahn Productions).

Young found it difficult to sell his series to Hollywood executives without a local presence there so in 1989 the family moved to Los Angeles, selling their rights to SuperTed and shares owned in Siriol Animation to finance the move and to set up Mike Young Productions, now called Splash Entertainment. The company's first production was P. J. Sparkles, after which it was involved in many other animated series, including The Hot Rod Dogs and Cool Car Cats (co-produced with the Dave Edwards Studio), The Life and Adventures of Santa Claus, He-Man and the Masters of the Universe (the 2002 series), Two computer-animated series: Pet Alien, Jakers! The Adventures of Piggley Winks (which won seven Emmys and a BAFTA Award), Growing Up Creepie, a Bratz TV series and five full-length Bratz DVD movies, I Got a Rocket! (which won a Emmy Award), Dive Olly Dive, Chloe's Closet, Care Bears: Welcome to Care-a-Lot, Strawberry Shortcake, and Sabrina: Secrets of a Teenage Witch.

Young's company has also created a series of caricatures at Cardiff City Stadium.

=== Personal life ===
Young is married to partner, president and the other co-founder of Mike Young Productions, Liz Young. A football fanatic, he is a lifelong supporter of Cardiff City F.C., and runs a junior soccer league in California. Young was awarded the Chancellor's Medal at the 2007 graduation ceremony of the University of Glamorgan.

== Filmography ==
Mike Young has worked on the following series:

=== In partnership with Siriol Animation ===
- SuperTed (1983–1985, TV)
- Wil Cwac Cwac (1984, TV)
- A Winter Story (1986, TV)
- The Easter Egg (1987, TV)
- Turkey Love (1988, TV)
- Fantastic Max (1988–1990, TV) (with Hanna-Barbera)
- The Further Adventures of Super Ted (1989, TV) (with Hanna-Barbera)
- The Little Engine That Could (1991, Film) (with S4C and Universal Studios)
- The Princess and the Goblin (1994, Film) (with S4C, Pannonia Film Studio, NHK, Rankin/Bass Animated Entertainment, Hemdale Picture Corporation, and J&M Entertainment)
- Gerald of Wales

He left UK to work in partnership with other companies

- Little Dracula (with Fox Kids)
- Potsworth & Co. (AKA: Midnight Patrol: Adventures in the Dream Zone) (with Hanna-Barbera, BBC and Sleepy Kids Company Ltd)
- The Hot Rod Dogs and Cool Car Cats (with The Dave Edwards Studio)
- Once Upon a Forest (Film, 1993)
