= The Magnificent Evans =

1984 British TV sitcom

- Written by: Roy Clarke
- Starring: Ronnie Barker; Sharon Morgan; Myfanwy Talog
- Country of origin: United Kingdom
- No. of series: 1
- No. of episodes: 6

Production
- Running time: 30 minutes per episode

Original release
- Network: BBC1
- Release: 6 September – 11 October 1984

The Magnificent Evans is a 1984 BBC sitcom written by Roy Clarke and starring Ronnie Barker, Sharon Morgan and Myfanwy Talog.

== Plot ==
Ronnie Barker played Welsh photographer Plantagenet Evans, a tactless but likeable bully with an intolerance towards fools and an overdeveloped sense of his own abilities. Sharon Morgan played Evans's long-time fiancée Rachel, who also doubled as his assistant and had a full-time job steering his lusting eyes away from other women and back to his job.

The series was filmed on location at the old Gwalia bakery on Irfon Terrace in Llanwrtyd Wells, Powys.

It was written by Roy Clarke, who also wrote Open All Hours for Barker, plus successful sitcoms Last of the Summer Wine and Keeping Up Appearances. However, despite it being a much heralded series, securing the front cover of the BBC listing magazine Radio Times for their autumn season of new programming, only one series was made and neither Evans nor the premise had the chance to develop any further. The BBC has never repeated the series on any of its channels. The series is now available on Region One DVD and on Region Two DVD as part of The Ultimate Ronnie Barker DVD Collection.

== Characters ==
- Ronnie Barker as Plantagenet Evans, an unsuccessful Welsh photographer and self acclaimed genius.
- Sharon Morgan as Rachel Harris, Evans long time fiancée and personal assistant who does most of the work and waits impatiently for marriage.
- Myfanwy Talog as Bronwyn, Rachel's uptight and prudish sister.
- William Thomas as Probert, Bronwyn's similarly uptight, prudish and thoroughly boring husband.
- Dickie Arnold as Willie, Evans's cheerfully mute, toothless and alcoholic chauffeur and handyman. Evans has great misplaced faith in his ability to skillfully do almost anything, frequently commenting that he will "get the hang of it."
- Dyfed Thomas as Olwin "Home Rule" O'Toole, a militant but harmless Welshman who doubts Evans's supposed genius and is in love with Rachel.

== Episodes ==
No.	Title	Produced & Directed by	Written by	Original release date
1	"Episode 1"	Sydney Lotterby	Roy Clarke	6 September 1984
Rachel is eager to be married as she and Evans are currently living in sin, which she attempts unsuccessfully to hide from the neighbours by claiming she "has her own apartment". Evans, however, is disappointed his photography business is not more successful as he must also buy and sell antiques to make a living. At a wedding Evans upsets the bride by pointing out her unusually large nose. Rachel's uptight sister, Bronwyn, and her boring husband, Probert, attempt to pry her away from Evans and get her a respectable job but are scandalised when Rachel prefers to be happy instead. Evans is asked to photograph the wedding of a wealthy couples daughter, but his tactless probing into their private life causes the wedding to be cancelled and the wealthy couple to divorce. Evans lands on his feet as he is able to purchase the divorced couples antiques at bargain prices. At another wedding Evans upsets yet another bride by tactlessly pointing out how much taller she is than her new husband.
2	"Episode 2"	Sydney Lotterby	Roy Clarke	13 September 1984
Evans causes domestic upset between a young engaged couple by tactlessly revealing the man also has a pregnant mistress. Bronwyn and Probert plan to point the new Reverend in the general direction of the villagers most unrepentant sinner; Evans. Rachel manages to stop Evans usual lack of tact from upsetting an elderly man considering attending the Open University, but fails to stop him insulting the mans noticeable hunchback. Money problems appear as Evans upsets so many customers they earn no money for household bills. Evans is hired to photograph a champion ballroom dancing couple while Rachel is upset that even complete strangers are judging her for being unmarried. Evans usual lack of tact causes a rift between the couple over who is the better dancer, resulting in the wife falling into the river and the husband being sent to hospital after the wife beats him up.
3	"Episode 3"	Sydney Lotterby	Roy Clarke	20 September 1984
Evans decides his lack of prosperity is due to a severe lack of tourists. The village's Welsh fanatic, "Home Rule" O'Toole, attempts to woo Rachel and is surprised she has no interest in living with him and his mother in Llandudno. Evans' domestic bliss upsets the elderly priest who is disappointed that a sinner such as Evans is seen to be happy. Evans upsets another bride by tactlessly revealing how little money her father spent on the wedding. Evans plans to attract tourists by re-enacting a traditional welsh boar hunt, despite there being no wild boar left in Wales. Nevertheless he arranges for a busload of tourists to be delivered to the village and even provides a boar (a pig covered with black paint), and dresses his loyal assistant Willie in a traditional hunting costume. Unfortunately Willie's poorly timed visit to the bathroom allows the pig to escape but the tourists are satisfied seeing Willie chase it across the fields.
4	"Episode 4"	Sydney Lotterby	Roy Clarke	27 September 1984
Evans must photograph the Council Chairman with an unusually small head while tactlessly diagnosing the Chairman's desire to cheat on his wife with his secretary. Rachel faces criticism from Bronwyn and Probert about her unmarried relationship, despite Bronwyn herself becoming flustered at Evans charm. Much to Rachels relief, they quickly leave after Evans suggests Probert lend him money so Bronwyn can be the star of a risqué calendar. Evans is hired to photograph a local singing mechanic, though Rachel is less than pleased when the mechanics mother takes a shine to Evans. Evans almost photographs the wrong mechanic due to the thick layer of engine grease on his face and in the end simply takes a group photo of all the mechanics. Evans also has the idea of using the mechanics mother for his calendar, but Rachel is outraged after learning he plans on using a risqué photo of her as the February photograph.
5	"Episode 5"	Sydney Lotterby	Roy Clarke	4 October 1984
"Home Rule" O’Toole continues his pursuit of Rachel but is rebuffed again and decides to focus his amorous intentions on local girl Gwyneth Meg Williams. Bronwyn and Probert confront Rachel about the unlikelihood of Evans ever marrying her and scoff at the notion marrying Evans will make her happy since "happiness has nothing to do with marriage". Evans is hired to photograph another wedding, commenting with his usual tact that the groom is distinctly middle aged and still under his mother’s thumb. Evans becomes the proud owner of an antique mirror and almost sells it to O’Toole as a gift for Gwyneth, but O’Toole escapes. With the village fishing competition coming up Evans has the idea to dress his loyal assistant Willie as a fisherman for a promotional photograph, the only problem, Willie cannot swim. In the end Evans contents himself with several heroic shots of Willie being saved by the other fishermen.
6	"Episode 6"	Sydney Lotterby	Roy Clarke	11 October 1984
When Evans' antique car develops a rattle he decides to leave the repairs in the hands of his ever loyal assistant, Willie. Bronwyn begins to wonder if she might also contain a spark of wildness. She seeks advice from Rachel, who assures her Probert is boring enough to suppress any wildness which Bronwyn might possess, depressing Bronwyn. Probert also asks Rachel’s advice, hoping that Bronwyn might one day go mad and start wearing risqué underwear, though he is depressed when Rachel assures him it is unlikely. Rachel receives a second hand wedding dress from her recently married friend and with it Evans is finally convinced to marry her. "Home Rule" O’Toole makes one last attempt to woo Rachel, but she rebuffs him for the last time. Willie finally repairs Evans' car just in time to run over his foot. Surprisingly, Evans insists the wedding will not be cancelled. On the wedding day an unfortunate accident with his wheelchair leaves Evans' conjugal abilities in doubt and Rachel cancels the wedding to seek medical treatment, though Evans does promise they will get married, eventually, and gifts their romantic Paris honeymoon to a newly adventurous Bronwyn and Probert.
