= Pentre Bach =

Welsh language children's TV series

Pentre Bach ("Little Village") is a Welsh language television soap-opera for younger children, shown on S4C as part of the daily Planed Plant Bach ("Small Children's Planet") block. It is a follow-up series to Caffi Sali Mali, after the show was cancelled in 2001. The series is based on the characters created by Mary Vaughan Jones, the main character is Sali Mali, and the new characters were introduced, including her sister Jini (who is Jac y Jwc's love interest in the series). It first aired on 6 September 2004. It is the only soap-opera that's aimed towards younger children in any sort of media. It was also free to watch on BBC iPlayer.

It is filmed in the village of Blaenpennal, which lies some 14 miles (22.5 km) south of Aberystwyth in Ceredigion.

== Characters ==
- Bili Bom Bom
- Coblyn
- Jac Do – a puppet jackdaw
- Jaci Soch
- Jac y Jwc
- Jemeima Mop
- Jini (Sali Mali's sister and Jac y Jwc's love interest)
- Mrs Migl Magl
- Nicw Nacw
- Palu Pala
- Parri Popeth
- Pili Pala
- Pry Bach Tew
- Sali Mali – owns a café (Caffi Sali Mali)
- Shoni Bric-a-moni
- Siani Flewog
- Tomos Caradog
