= SuperTed =

British animated series by Mike Young (1982–1986)

- Created by: Mike Young
- Written by: Mike Young; Robin Lyons
- Directed by: David Edwards
- Starring: Geraint Jarman; Martin Griffiths; Valmai Jones; Gari Williams; Huw Ceredig; Emyr Young; Derek Griffiths; Melvyn Hayes; Roy Kinnear; Jon Pertwee; Victor Spinetti; Sheila Steafel; Myfanwy Talog; Wendy Padbury
- Narrated by: Dyfan Roberts; Peter Hawkins
- Country of origin: United Kingdom
- Original language: Welsh
- No. of series: 3
- No. of episodes: 36

Production
- Executive producers: Mike Young; Roger Fickling
- Running time: 10 minutes
- Production companies: Siriol Animation; S4C; Williams and Glyn Leasing Group Ltd.

Original release
- Network: S4C; BBC One
- Release: 1 November 1982 (United Kingdom); 4 October 1983; – 20 February 1986

SuperTed is a Welsh superhero animated television series about an anthropomorphic teddy bear with superpowers, created by writer and animation producer Mike Young. Originally conceived as a series of stories to help his son overcome fear of the dark, SuperTed became a popular series of books and led to an animated series produced from 1982 to 1986.

An American series, The Further Adventures of SuperTed, was produced by Hanna-Barbera in 1989. It was the first British animation acquired by the US-based Disney Channel.

== Creation ==
The character was devised by Mike Young in 1978 for his son to help him overcome fear of the dark. Later, Young decided to put the stories into book form, originally as a bear from the woods who was also afraid of the dark, until one day, Mother Nature gave him a magic word which gives him superpowers and transforms him into SuperTed.

His early attempts were unsuccessful, until he made some adjustments with the help of a local printer and was finally able to get his stories published. This led Young to write and publish over 100 SuperTed books, with illustrations by Philip Watkins, until 1990. Just after his first book was published, his wife suggested he should produce a stuffed-toy version of SuperTed, which was achieved in 1980.

Young was determined to keep SuperTed Welsh, as he wanted to help create local jobs and prove that places outside London had talent. In 1982 S4C enquired about making SuperTed into an animated TV series, but Young decided to create Siriol Productions and produce the series himself. Siriol management wished to create SuperTed in a way which their own children could be proud of, free from facile plots and hard-line violence. This concept continued to be adopted in all series made by Siriol, which proves "soft edge and quality animation can be more appealing to children than any amount of violence". By November 1982 it had been sold to over 30 countries.

In 1989 Mike Young partly sold off the rights to the series, with a 75% stake in SuperTed being acquired by the newly formed Abbey Home Entertainment with Young retaining the other 25%. Following the closure of Abbey Home Media in 2020, Mike Young purchased back that 75% stake of the series under his own company Splash Entertainment.

=== Premise ===
The story follows an ordinary teddy bear who, upon his creation at a toy factory, was deemed defective and thrown away into a storeroom. By chance, he is discovered by Spotty, a visiting alien from the Planet Spot, who decides to bring the bear to life using his cosmic dust. Spotty then brings the now-living teddy bear to Mother Nature, who gives the bear special powers, transforming him into SuperTed. Whenever trouble arises, SuperTed whispers his "secret magic word" and transforms into a superhero adorned with a red suit, cape and rocket boots. As SuperTed and Spotty travel across the world, and sometimes even space, to help others in need, they find themselves up against the nefarious and greedy cowboy, Texas Pete, and his two henchmen; the overweight and bumbling Bulk and the cowardly and effeminate Skeleton, as he seeks to either rule the world or increase his own wealth.

=== The Further Adventures of SuperTed ===
The Further Adventures of SuperTed is a British-American-produced series, produced by Hanna-Barbera and broadcast in 1989. The revival was one of four series aired as part of The Funtastic World of Hanna-Barbera syndicated animation block.

=== Public Service Film ===
SuperTed, along with Spotty and his sister Blotch, appeared in a Public Information Film sponsored by the Green Cross Code in 1986. The film, commissioned by the Central Office of Information, was entitled "Super Safe with SuperTed", and featured the three characters being flown to Earth by SuperTed, in order to teach Spotty how to cross the road safely after he nearly gets hit by a car by recklessly rushing across the road on the planet Spot (his home), to talk to his sister. It was included in two episode compilation videos: Magic of SuperTed (1986) and The Biggest Ever SuperTed Video (1994).

SuperTed proceeds during the animation to teach Spotty the right way to cross the road, including not running, not standing behind vehicles, etc. He then warns the viewer: "Remember, I can't be there to save you, especially on the planet Earth". The animated "setting" for the film was based on Castle Street in Cardiff city centre, Wales with Cardiff Castle as a backdrop.

This SuperTed public information film was first broadcast on the BBC on 26 March 1986 and was later rebroadcast and edited as a short commercial which aired on BBC1.

=== Stage show ===
SuperTed was also turned into a stage show. Although Jon Pertwee, Victor Spinetti and Melvyn Hayes reprised their roles, other parts were taken by other actors. SuperTed's popularity even led to the production of a line of vitamin supplements for children.

=== International broadcast ===
The series was reportedly sold to 128 countries and dubbed in 32 languages. SuperTed aired in Australia on ABC (where it was shown many times twice, starting from 3 May 1986 on Saturday mornings and then on weekday afternoons on 27 April 1987 and continued airing along with its American sequel until 13 May 1997), NTA in Nigeria, Channel 5 in Singapore (where it was reedited into two episodes), ZBC in Zimbabwe, Kabel 1 in Germany, Rai 3 in Italy, SVT in Sweden, The Disney Channel and now Kabillion in the United States, NRK in Norway, TF1 and Canal J in France, RTÉ1, RTÉ2 and TG4 in Ireland (where it was dubbed into Irish Gaelic), TV One and TV2 in New Zealand, Dubai 33 in the United Arab Emirates, Kolmoskanava and MTV3 in Finland and Sjónvarpið in Iceland.

== Planned relaunch ==
In July 2014, SuperTed co-creator Mike Young announced that he was developing a brand new series of SuperTed with Abbey Home Media. The series, which will consist of 26 half-hour episodes, was pitched at trade shows in Autumn 2014. In an interview with Radio Times magazine, Young mentioned that certain aspects of the series would have to be changed for modern audiences. He stated, "In SuperTed, we had a gun-slinging cowboy, a flamboyantly gay skeleton and a fat guy who had jokes made about his weight. And all these things you just wouldn't do today. But you can still write the show in a funny, entertaining way." He also added that he wants to avoid making the reboot look too slick and lose some of its original charm like some other rebooted franchises, with hopes Derek Griffiths will return as the voice of SuperTed. In February 2016 Mike Young announced SuperTed would return towards the end of 2016, but admitted "SuperTed and his rivals Texas Pete, Bulk and Skeleton may have to change their ways to fit in with the expectations of a modern audience."

In March 2021, it was announced work had begun on new episodes, with a view to relaunch the show by 2023.

== Characters ==
=== Heroes ===
- SuperTed: A teddy bear brought to life by Spotty's cosmic dust and given special powers by Mother Nature. By uttering his secret magic word he can peel off his fur coat to reveal his superhero outfit, complete with rocket boots, which he uses to fight evil around the world. He is voiced by Geraint Jarman in the original Welsh-language version of the show and Derek Griffiths in the English dub.
- Spotty: SuperTed's bumbling companion and best friend, a yellow and green spotted alien from the planet Spot. He brought SuperTed to life with his cosmic dust and accompanies him on his missions, regardless of whether he wants to or not. He wears a jetpack for moving about and pilots a large spotted rocket to travel over the world or across space. He is voiced by Martin Griffiths in the original Welsh-language version of the show and Jon Pertwee in the English dub.
- Blotch: Spotty's sister, who is voiced by Sheila Steafel in the original Welsh-language version of the show and by Wendy Padbury in Super Safe with SuperTed.
- Mother Nature: Mother Nature, voiced by Valmai Jones in the original Welsh-language version of the show and Sheila Steafel in the English version, is portrayed here as a fairy who grants SuperTed his super powers with a special potion.

=== Villains ===
- Texas Pete: The main villain of the series. Texas Pete is an evil cowboy who serves as SuperTed's arch enemy. His goals are generally simple-minded, be it world domination, the destruction of SuperTed, or simply increasing his own wealth. He is voiced by Gari Williams in the original Welsh-language version of the show and Victor Spinetti in the English-language version.
- Skeleton: A very cowardly, noticeably-effeminate and exceptionally camp living skeleton who wears blue gloves and pink slippers. He is capable of being put back together whenever he falls apart. He is voiced by Emyr Young in the Welsh-language version and Melvyn Hayes in the English dub. Mike Young describes Skeleton as "flamboyantly gay".
- Bulk: An overweight and immensely stupid fool who serves as the muscle of the group. He is voiced by Huw Ceredig in the Welsh language original and Roy Kinnear in the English dub.

=== Other ===
- Narrator: voiced by Dyfan Roberts in Welsh and Peter Hawkins in English.

== Episodes ==
As Young was determined to keep SuperTed Welsh, he entered into partnership with S4C (the newly formed Welsh television channel) in 1981 who approached him about producing an animated series of SuperTed. He set up Siriol Animation with his wife, to produce the series locally, which first aired on 1 November 1982 on S4C in Welsh. The following year, it was dubbed into English and broadcast all over the United Kingdom on BBC1, from 4 October 1983.

Unlike the books, the television series was written by Robin Lyons and director Dave Edwards, who were also Directors of Siriol Animation, and between 1983 and 1986, three series, consisting of 12 episodes each, were made:

=== Series 1 (1983) ===
No. overall	No. in season	Title	Original release date
1	1	"SuperTed and the Inca Treasure"	4 October 1983
In the pilot episode of the series, SuperTed and Spotty go to find the lost Temple of the Incas, but Texas Pete, Bulk and Skeleton plan to beat them to it.
2	2	"SuperTed and the Pearl Fishers"	6 October 1983
SuperTed and Spottyman fly to the South Pacific Islands to stop Texas Pete, Bulk and Skeleton from stealing pearls from the ocean floor.
3	3	"SuperTed and the Stolen Rocket Ship"	11 October 1983
Texas Pete, Bulk and Skeleton plan to sabotage three astronauts' mission to travel deeper into space than any man has ever been before, but SuperTed and Spotty come to the rescue.
4	4	"SuperTed and the Giant Kites"	12 October 1983
In the mountains of Wales, SuperTed and Spotty must stop Texas Pete and his cronies from stealing the eggs of a rare bird known as the Giant Red Kite.
5	5	"SuperTed and the Elephant's Graveyard"	18 October 1983
SuperTed and Spotty go to East Africa to stop Texas Pete, Bulk and Skeleton from stealing bones from the elephant's graveyard.
6	6	"SuperTed and the Train Robbers"	20 October 1983
SuperTed and Spotty's skiing holiday in the Alps is interrupted by Texas Pete's plan to steal a train carrying a cargo of chocolate.
7	7	"SuperTed at Creepy Castle"	25 October 1983
A girl's father has gone missing at the Creepy Castle in Eastern Europe and SuperTed and Spotty go to find him. However, Texas Pete, Bulk and Skeleton are also using the area as a hideout after robbing a bank.
8	8	"SuperTed and Nuts in Space"	27 October 1983
SuperTed and Spotty must thwart Texas Pete's plan to take over a freighter carrying a special consignment of nuts for the planet Polly.
9	9	"SuperTed and the City of the Dead"	1 November 1983
SuperTed and Spotty travel to the ancient city in Egypt of the dead to find an archaeologist who has gone missing.
10	10	"SuperTed at the Funfair"	3 November 1983
A boy is kidnapped by Texas Pete on his visit to the funfair. With Spotty unwell, SuperTed goes alone to find him.
11	11	"SuperTed and the Goldmine"	8 November 1983
In the heart of Africa, Texas Pete, Bulk and Skeleton go to steal gold inside a mine. SuperTed and Spotty head off to the rescue.
12	12	"SuperTed on Planet Spot"	10 November 1983
SuperTed's holiday on the friendly Planet Spot is interrupted when Texas Pete's rocket crash-lands on the planet. Tex is after the cosmic dust that brought SuperTed to life.

=== Series 2 (1984) ===
No. overall	No. in season	Title	Original release date
13	1	"SuperTed at the Toy Shop"	3 October 1984
Whilst searching for a birthday present for Spotty, SuperTed discovers that Texas Pete and his cronies are planning to rob the biggest toy shop in the world.
14	2	"SuperTed in Texas"	10 October 1984
A girl called Judy has had her long horn cattle stolen. SuperTed and Spotty fly down to Texas to retrieve the cattle. Once there, they meet up with a cowboy who is similar to Texas Pete.
15	3	"SuperTed in the Arctic"	17 October 1984
Texas Pete is after the rare creature of the Arctic, the Mammoth. But soon SuperTed and Spotty Man arrive, ready to fight back and save the day.
16	4	"SuperTed and Trouble in Space – Part 1"	24 October 1984
After destroying the space satellite, Texas Pete, Bulk and Skeleton sneak into SuperTed's space station to take Spotty by surprise. SuperTed, on his way back, encounters a crash and soon is drifting away into space with no memory.
17	5	"SuperTed and Trouble in Space – Part 2"	31 October 1984
SuperTed has lost his memory, Spotty's parents have lost their daughter Blotch and Spotty himself is being held prisoner by Texas Pete, Bulk and Skeleton. To make matters worse, Texas Pete arranges for our heroes to be tied up in a rocket heading straight for the sun.
18	6	"SuperTed and the Gun Smugglers"	7 November 1984
While investigating a strange light, a girl is captured by Texas Pete, who is smuggling weapons into North Wales via a submarine in a cavern, forcing SuperTed and Spotty to put their beach holiday on hold.
19	7	"SuperTed and the Crystal Ball"	14 November 1984
Texas Pete steals a crystal ball from a couple of gypsies and uses it to read other people's fortunes for his own wealth... and forecast doom for SuperTed.
20	8	"Spotty and the Indians"	21 November 1984
On his way to Planet Earth to see SuperTed, Spotty's rocket breaks down and he crash-lands in North America where he befriends a Red Indian. Also there, are Texas Pete, Bulk and Skeleton who plan to shoot a buffalo to in order to have some buffalo steaks for dinner.
21	9	"SuperTed's Dream"	28 November 1984
After being catty with Spotty for making him get out of bed to retrieve him from outside the space station, SuperTed has a horrible nightmare which shows him what life might be like if he didn't have Spotty with him.
22	10	"SuperTed and the Lumberjacks"	5 December 1984
A flying squirrel turns to SuperTed and Spotty for help when Texas Pete is responsible for cutting down the trees to sell.
23	11	"Bulk's Story"	12 December 1984
Bulk tells the story of how he first met Texas Pete in jail and how they escaped and entered the tomb of Skeleton.
24	12	"SuperTed Meets Father Christmas"	19 December 1984
Texas Pete, Bulk, and Skeleton disguise themselves as Father Christmas and rob children of their presents on Christmas Eve. It's up to SuperTed and Spotty to clear the real Father Christmas' name and stop the villains from ruining Christmas.

=== Series 3 (1985–86) ===
No. overall	No. in season	Title	Original release date
25	1	"SuperTed and the Gorilla"	12 November 1985
Texas Pete, Bulk, and Skeleton capture a gorilla while in Africa, but when SuperTed and Spotty Man come to the rescue, Bulk unknowingly plays a part in helping the now captive gorilla.
26	2	"SuperTed and the Magic Word – Part 1"	19 November 1985
Texas Pete has hatched a plot to discover SuperTed's magic word. First, Bulk throws Skeleton off the Statue of Liberty where Skeleton his holding onto the sleeve of the statue. Secondly, once SuperTed and Spotty Man have gone to rescue him, Texas Pete hides small microphones in the treehouse. Thirdly, Texas Pete throws Skeleton into the sea, a hundred miles off the coast to be exact. Finally, once SuperTed gets the call for help, he'll say his magic word... and Bulk will be listening.
27	3	"SuperTed and the Magic Word – Part 2"	26 November 1985
Bulk now wears the suit of SuperTed and is able to fly like a bear. Before long, SuperTed and Spotty Man discover this and try to catch him. However, luckily, Bulk has forgotten the magic word... making Texas Pete cry after spending all the trouble of organising the plot.
28	4	"SuperTed and the Pothole Rescue"	3 December 1985
SuperTed is called to the Pennines to rescue two geologists who are trapped in a cave, but soon finds himself in an awful dilemma when Spotty Man disappears and he has to choose to save his friend or the geologists first.
29	5	"SuperTed Kicks Up the Dust"	10 December 1985
A museum in the Middle East wishes to display the Cosmic Dust that Spotty Man uses, but SuperTed thinks it could be dangerous and his fears prove correct when Texas Pete and his cronies plan to steal the Cosmic Dust from the museum.
30	6	"SuperTed and the Whales"	17 December 1985
After rescuing a beached blue whale in Wales, SuperTed and Spotty Man aid the whale in saving its family from a whaling boat piloted by none other than Texas Pete.
31	7	"SuperTed and Mother Nature"	9 January 1986
Mother Nature's place is invaded by Texas Pete, Bulk and Skeleton. Texas Pete plans to drink some of the potion that Mother Nature gave to SuperTed in order to gain super powers. But soon SuperTed and Spotty Man come to rescue as usual.
32	8	"SuperTed and the Great Horrendo"	16 January 1986
At a seaside town in England, Texas Pete takes up a magician's act under the alias "Great Horrendo" to cheat children out of their allowances and briefly sidetrack SuperTed by making Spotty Man a volunteer in his hypnosis trick.
33	9	"SuperTed Goes Round the Bend"	23 January 1986
Spotty Man reluctantly agrees to take driving lessons from SuperTed. However, Skeleton and Bulk steal it to drive it to the bank where Texas Pete is, robbing it. But unknown to the three villains, the car is running out of brake fluid, causing the brakes to fail.
34	10	"SuperTed and Tex's Magic Spell"	6 February 1986
While SuperTed and Spotty Man relax in an island in the South Pacific, Texas Pete and his cronies steal SuperTed's spotted teddy bear and use it as part of a voodoo act to incapacitate SuperTed.
35	11	"SuperTed in Chinatown"	13 February 1986
Texas Pete, Bulk, and Skeleton plan to rob a bank in Hong Kong, using Hong Kong's old secret passageways, but Bulk blows open the wall into a restaurant... where SuperTed and Spotty Man are having dinner.
36	12	"SuperTed and the Rattlesnake"	20 February 1986
In a large Eastern city in the United States, Texas Pete has the blues about being unable to beat SuperTed, so Bulk and Skeleton decide to cheer him up by stealing a rattlesnake from the city zoo... attracting the attention of SuperTed and Spotty Man once more.
