= Sali Mali =

Welsh children's book and TV character

The original Sali Mali, as drawn by Rowena Wyn Jones, published in 1969.

Sali Mali is a popular Welsh children's book and television character, first created by author Mary Vaughan Jones and illustrated by Rowena Wyn Jones in 1969. Many Welsh-speaking children learnt to read by reading Sali Mali books.

== Books ==
Following the death of Mary Vaughan Jones, many of her original books were re-published. The copyright belonged to Cymdeithas Lyfrau Ceredigion until the publisher was bought by Gomer Press in 2009. Characters are:

- Sali Mali
- Jac Do (Jackdaw)
- Jaci Soch
- Jac y Jwc
- Jini (Sali Mali's sister)
- Tomos Caradog (Thomas Caradog)
- Nicw Nacw
- Pry Bach Tew
- Siani Flewog
- Dwmplen Malwoden
- Morgan and Magi Ann
- Mop Golchi Llestri (Dish Washing Mop)
- Llwy Bren (Wooden Spoon)
- Sosban Fach (Small Saucepan)

Many new titles for children were authored by Dylan Williams and illustrated by Simon Bradbury. One of these books courted controversy in December 2007, when Sali Mali a'r Hwdi Chwim was published, in the story Sali Mali's iPod is stolen by a hoodie. Several bookshops boycotted the book by refusing to stock it.

== Television series ==
Prior to 1994, Sali Mali didn't have any television adaptations, not even the events of that book were mentioned in any of its television shows.

An animated Sali Mali series was produced by Siriol Productions and Cymru Cyfru and Calon for S4C in 2000. The theme tune to this was sung by Cerys Matthews (Angharad Bisby in some versions), and the series is narrated by Rhys Ifans. Sali Mali had broadcast in English on Nickelodeon. The show also aired on Channel 4 and has also been sold to Scandinavian countries. A second series aired in 2020 with new added characters and episodes now lasting 10 minutes and broadcast on the children's pre school channel Cbeebies. The theme tune was updated and slightly reworked.

A preschool live-action children's musical television series, Caffi Sali Mali (English: Sali Mali's Cafe), was produced by Siânco for S4C in 1994 and ended in 2001, which was Sali Mali and the others' first television appearance. There are songs every episode, and it was an episodic series, where each episode has a different plot. There was also a spin-off of this series called Slot Syniadau Sali. It was written by Ifana Savill using the characters created by Mary Vaughan Jones, including Sali Mali's pet bird, Jac-do, and her good friend, Jac y Jwc. This series is produced using actors in costumes and puppets. Sali Mali runs a cafe in the small village of "Pentre Bach" (English Little Village). A follow-up soap-opera series, Pentre Bach, which consisted of 52 episodes and aired on 6 September 2004 to 2007, after Caffi Sali Mali was cancelled in 2001, was filmed using a purpose-built village, located in Blaenpennal, which is also a guest centre run by Ifana and Adrian Savill. The rights to the series were bought by Al-Jazeera in April 2006, to be shown across the Middle East in Arabic.

Languages are:

- British English
- German
- Danish
- Welsh
- Arabic
- Norwegian
- Latin American Spanish
- Polish
- Korean
- Scottish Gaelic
- Slovene
- American English

== Episodes ==
- Autumn Leaves
- Little Lamb Lost
- Dirty Feet
- Time Flies
- Windy Day
- Stowaway Guest
- Leaving Home
- Christmas Eve
- Digging for Treasure
- Splash Day
- Wet Paint
- Hot and Bothered
- Playing in the Snow
- Snowed In
- Hide and Eek
- Who Ate The Lettuce?
- Twins
- Hot Day
- Say Cheese
- Lost Friends
- Easter Eggstravaganza
- Blackberry Belly
- A Model Model
- Chimney Weep
- Snow Fun
- Mushroom Madness
- Have An Ice-Day
- Feeding the Birds
- Sing Along A-Sali
- Achoo
- Naughty Day
- Spring Clean
- Mama Jackdaw
- One, Two, Three
- At The Seaside
- Let's Go Camping
- Happy Birthday, Jackdaw
- Falling Leaves
- Bake A Cake
- Balloon Race
- How Does Your Garden Grow
- The Storm
- The Visitors
- Snap!
- Making Music
- The New Teddy
- Sticky Toffee
- Boo!
- Making Masks
- Keep Fit
- All Tied Up
- He's Been Framed
