= Igam Ogam =

- Genre: Preschool; Comedy
- Created by: Andrew Offiler
- Directed by: Ben Halliwell
- Voices of: Bernard Latham; Tony Leader; Ruth Jones; Ali Curries (season 1); Sian Bradbury (season 1); Ruby Llewelyn (season 2); Hallie Green (season 2); Sean Clancy (season 2)
- Countries of origin: United Kingdom; Germany; Ireland (season 2)
- Original languages: English; Welsh
- No. of series: 2
- No. of episodes: 52

Production
- Executive producers: Robin Lyons; Arne Lohmann; Siân Eirian (season 1); Nick Wilson (season 1); Paul Cummins (season 2); Sioned Roberts (season 2); Jessica Symons (season 2); Jutta Traver (season 2)
- Producers: Robin Lyons (season 1); Siobhán Ní Ghadhra (season 2)
- Running time: 11 minutes
- Production companies: Calon; ZDF Enterprises; Soundworks (season 1); Wales Creative IP Fund (season 1); Telegael (season 2)

Original release
- Network: Channel 5 and S4C (United Kingdom); ZDF (Germany)
- Release: 4 May 2009 – 31 December 2013

Igam Ogam (Welsh for "zig-zag") is a British pre-school stop motion animated television series created by Andrew Offiler. It follows a cave girl named Igam Ogam and the prehistoric animals she befriends.

== Characters ==
- Igam Ogam - The main heroine, an unruly cave girl. Voiced by Sian Bradbury in season 1 and Ruby Llewelyn in season 2.
- Triple Tog – A flat sabre-toothed tiger, who acts as Igam Ogam's blanket. He is the grumpy voice of reason, reminiscent of Eeyore in the Winnie-the-Pooh books. Voiced by Bernard Latham.
- Doggie – Igam Ogam's pet dog-like dinosaur (raptor) of the Lickasaurus kind, who likes to play hide and seek. Voiced by Bernard Latham.
- Big Daddy – A T-Rex, who acts as the only authority and father figure to Igam Ogam. Voiced by Tony Leader
- Roly – Igam Ogam's best friend, a monkey/ape (dryopithecine/chimpanzee) obsessed with bananas, who gets around by rolling forwards. Voiced by Ali Curries in season 1 and Hallie Green in season 2.
- Birdie – Igam Ogam's second friend, a wise pterodactyl lady. Voiced by Ruth Jones.
- Narrator - A voice which comments on Igam Ogam's antics, but also addresses the characters and talks with them. Voiced by Ruth Jones.
- Wriggle Wiggle – A fluffy worm with a mischievous sense of humour.
- Finian – A fish, who wants to be friends with Igam Ogam and can move outside of water. Introduced in season 2. Voiced by Sean Clancy.

== Episodes ==
=== Series overview ===
Series	Episodes	Originally released	
Series	Episodes	First released	Last released
1	26	4 May 2009	10 August 2009
2	26	16 September 2013	31 December 2013

=== Season 1 (2009) ===
No. overall	No. in season	Title	Directed by	Written by	Original release date	Viewers (millions)
1	1	"Want it!"	Ben Halliwell	Annie Smyth	4 May 2009	N/A
2	2	"That's Funny!"	Ben Halliwell	Tiziana Vox	5 May 2009	N/A
3	3	"Where's my Doggie?"	Ben Halliwell	Annie Smyth	6 May 2009	N/A
4	4	"I'm Not Igam Ogam, I'm Naughty."	Ben Halliwell	Annie Smyth	7 May 2009	N/A
5	5	"Want It Back!"	Ben Halliwell	Tea Orsi	8 May 2009	N/A
6	6	"Oops, It Broke"	Ben Halliwell	Eirlys Bellin and Sarah Govett	11 May 2009	N/A
7	7	"Boo!"	Ben Halliwell	Gloria Thomas and Robin Hughes	12 May 2009	N/A
8	8	"Listen To Me!"	Ben Halliwell	Holly Lyons	13 May 2009	N/A
9	9	"Bath Time"	Ben Halliwell	Simon Rolph	14 May 2009	N/A
10	10	"I'm Bouncing"	Ben Halliwell	Nigel Crowle	15 May 2009	N/A
11	11	"All Gone!"	Ben Halliwell	Les Brooksbank	20 May 2009	N/A
12	12	"I'm Best!"	Ben Halliwell	Sian Harries	21 May 2009	N/A
13	13	"Again!"	Ben Halliwell	Robin Lyons	22 May 2009	N/A
14	14	"Want to Be Big!"	Ben Halliwell	Tony Barnes	7 June 2009	N/A
15	15	"Bless You!"	Ben Halliwell	Steve Sullivan	8 June 2009	N/A
16	16	"Faster!"	Ben Halliwell	Robin Lyons	9 June 2009	N/A
17	17	"Catch!"	Ben Halliwell	Marie Davies	10 June 2009	N/A
18	18	"My Turn!"	Ben Halliwell	John Sinclair	13 June 2009	N/A
19	19	"Wasn't Me!"	Ben Halliwell	Tony Barnes	14 June 2009	N/A
20	20	"One, Two, Three"	Ben Halliwell	Wayne Thomas	15 June 2009	N/A
21	21	"Not Now!"	Ben Halliwell	Nigel Crowle	3 August 2009	N/A
22	22	"Too Hot!"	Ben Halliwell	Eirlys Bellin and Sarah Govett	4 August 2009	N/A
23	23	"Sorry!"	Ben Halliwell	Robin Lyons	5 August 2009	N/A
24	24	"Rain, Rain, Go Away!"	Ben Halliwell	Sian Harries	6 August 2009	N/A
25	25	"Are You Ticklish?"	Ben Halliwell	Robin Lyons and Andrew Offiler	9 August 2009	N/A
26	26	"Tag!"	Ben Halliwell	Corbett Miteff	10 August 2009	N/A

=== Season 2 (2013) ===
No. overall	No. in season	Title	Directed by	Written by	Original release date	Viewers (millions)
27	1	"Tell Me a Story"	Ben Halliwell	Robin Lyons and Andrew Offiler	20 September 2013	N/A
28	2	"Shhhh!"	Ben Halliwell	Robin Lyons and Andrew Offiler	23 September 2013	N/A
29	3	"Not Here"	Ben Halliwell	Robin Lyons and Andrew Offiler	24 September 2013	N/A
30	4	"Kiss It Better"	Ben Halliwell	Robin Lyons and Andrew Offiler	20 September 2013	N/A
31	5	"Need a Wash"	Ben Halliwell	Robin Lyons and Andrew Offiler	27 September 2013	N/A
32	6	"Wakey Shakey"	Ben Halliwell	Robin Lyons and Andrew Offiler	28 September 2013	N/A
33	7	"What's That?"	Ben Halliwell	Anne West	1 October 2013	N/A
34	8	"Where's It Gone?"	Ben Halliwell	Andrew Offiler and Ben Halliwell	2 October 2013	N/A
35	9	"Want to Sing?"	Ben Halliwell	Andrew Offiler and Robin Lyons	4 October 2013	N/A
36	10	"Can I Play?"	Ben Halliwell	Anne West	25 September 2013	N/A
37	11	"Can't Sleep"	Ben Halliwell	Andrew Offiler and Robin Lyons	24 September 2013	N/A
38	12	"Good Boy"	Ben Halliwell	Annie Smyth	26 September 2013	N/A
39	13	"Is That Me?"	Ben Halliwell	Eleonora Fornasari	18 December 2013	N/A
40	14	"Not Mine"	Ben Halliwell	Annie Smyth	16 September 2013	N/A
41	15	"Do It"	Ben Halliwell	Tea Orsi	20 December 2013	N/A
42	16	"Guess"	Ben Halliwell	Robin Lyons and Andrew Offiler	21 December 2013	N/A
43	17	"Don't Touch"	Ben Halliwell	Annie Smyth	24 December 2013	N/A
44	18	"I'm Busy"	Ben Halliwell	Marie Davies	19 December 2013	N/A
45	19	"You Look Nice"	Ben Halliwell	Robin Lyons and Andrew Offiler	14 December 2013	N/A
46	20	"Press the Button"	Ben Halliwell	Robin Lyons and Andrew Offiler	17 December 2013	N/A
47	21	"Coming"	Ben Halliwell	Robin Lyons and Andrew Offiler	26 December 2013	N/A
48	22	"Found It!"	Ben Halliwell	Robin Lyons and Andrew Offiler	25 December 2013	N/A
49	23	"Not Fair"	Ben Halliwell	Robin Lyons and Andrew Offiler	27 December 2013	N/A
50	24	"Too Late"	Ben Halliwell	Robin Lyons and Andrew Offiler	28 December 2013	N/A
51	25	"Smile"	Ben Halliwell	Robin Lyons and Andrew Offiler	30 December 2013	N/A
52	26	"Hic"	Ben Halliwell	Robin Lyons and Andrew Offiler	31 December 2013	N/A

== Production ==
The series is produced by Welsh company Calon and German company ZDF Enterprises for Five and S4C. For the first season, BBC Alba, Soundworks and Wales Creative IP Fund joined as co-producers. For the second season, Irish company Telegael Teoranta joined as a co-production company. The main creative team and voice talent have stayed the same throughout the seasons. However, the two parts voiced by children such as Igam Ogam and Roly were recast.

== Release ==
=== Broadcast ===
The first season aired on Channel 5 in their kids block Milkshake! from May till April 2010 and the second season got its first run from 31 October until December 2013 on the same channel.

The series was also broadcast on Knowledge Kids and BBC Kids (Canada), KiKa (Germany), ČT :D (Czech Republic), ABC Kids (Australia) and NPO Zappelin (Netherlands).

=== Home media and online viewing ===
8 episodes from the first season were made available on a DVD self-released by Calon, available in separate Welsh and English editions. On 14 April 2014 the first 13 episodes of the first season were given an official retail DVD release in United Kingdom through Signature Entertainment.

Season 1 is available on Amazon Instant Video in United Kingdom.

=== Adaptations ===
Calon released two picture books, Where's My Doggie? and I'm Not Igam Ogam, covering the specific episodes.

The Welsh creative dance company Coreo Cymru and the Wales Millennium Centre in association with Calon have produced a live dance and acrobatics stage show called The Igam Ogam Show (Sioe Igam Ogam in Welsh language), which toured several Welsh cities in summer 2013. The show was created by Carole Blade.
