= Wil Cwac Cwac =

Children's animated television series

- Directed by: Beth Mcfall
- Narrated by: Myfanwy Talog (Welsh and British English); Liza Ross (American English)
- Country of origin: United Kingdom (Wales)
- Original language: Welsh
- No. of episodes: 30

Production
- Producer: Robin Lyons
- Running time: 5 minutes
- Production company: Siriol Animation

Original release
- Network: S4C (Welsh); ITV (English); ORF (German)
- Release: 1982 (Welsh); 1984 – 1986 (English); 1987 – 1987 (German)

Wil Cwac Cwac is a Welsh-language children's animated television series produced by Siriol Animation for S4C in 1982. It is based on a series of children's books written in the early 1930s by Jennie Thomas and J. O. Williams, including the famous Welsh-language book Llyfr Mawr y Plant (Welsh for The Big Children's Book), which was first published in 1931. Both the book and television series take place in a version of rural Wales inhabited by anthropomorphic animals.

An English-language version of the show (called Will Quack Quack) was produced for the wider English-speaking market, and the show was successful on the international market. The first 20 episodes were dubbed in British English and aired on Children's ITV in 1984, with the remaining 10 following in 1986. In both versions, all narration and characters were voiced by Myfanwy Talog. An American English dub was also made, with Liza Ross narrating, which aired in the United States on The Disney Channel as a segment on the program Lunch Box.

== Characters ==
- Wil (Will in the series' English dub) – a duckling who is the show's protagonist and title character. He wears a white shirt, blue trousers and a blue scarf.
- Martha – Wil's mother. She is a brown duck who wears a purple and white dress, a green apron with white flowers on it, brown shoes and a white bonnet.
- Hwmffra – Wil's father. He is a green duck who wears a brown coat, green waistcoat, white shirt, grey trousers, boots and a peaked cap.
- Percy – Wil's cousin who first appears in the episode 'Cousin Percy'. He wears a smart blue suit and glasses.
- Mari Pickles – A duck who is Martha's friend. She wears a smart red dress and a hat.
- Sioni – A cockerel who is one of Wil's friends. He wears a blue and white striped trousers, a light blue coat and a white scarf.
- Huw – A goose who is one of Wil's friends. He wears a blue shirt and yellow trousers with red braces.
- Dic – A duckling who is one of Wil's friends. He wears a pink shirt and red polka-dot trousers.
- Ifan – A turkey who is one of Wil's friends, as well as his best friend. He wears overalls and a green shirt.
- Doctor Parry – A ram who is the village doctor.
- Mr. Puw the Shop – A grumpy pig who runs the village shop.
- Mr. Owie Policeman – A goose who is the village policeman. He wears a police uniform.
- Mr. Jones the School – A goat who is the headteacher at the school attended by Wil and his friends.

== Episodes ==
No.	Title
1	"Mr. Puw-the-Shop"
2	"The Birthday"
3	"Late for School!"
4	"The Fishing Rod"
5	"Football"
6	"Atishoo!"
7	"The Bike"
8	"Hiccups"
9	"Pepper!"
10	"Pancakes"
11	"The China Dog"
12	"Whip and Top"
13	"Coal House"
14	"Whitewash"
15	"Hwmffra's Letter"
16	"Will, Sioni and the Bikes"
17	"Clogs"
18	"Doctor Parry"
19	"Cousin Percy"
20	"Thief"
21	"Honey"
22	"The Horseshoe"
23	"The Mill Ness Monster"
24	"Cops and Robbers"
25	"Stuck in a Tree"
26	"A Shower"
27	"Will Goes Missing"
28	"The Ring"
29	"The Concert"
30	"Hwmffra Has a Drink"
