= Fantastic Max =

Animated cartoon series

- Genre: Adventure; Animated series Cartoon; Sci-fi; Comedy
- Developed by: Judy Rothman Rofé; Robin Lyons; Mike Young
- Written by: Kristina Luckey; Judy Rothman Rofé
- Directed by: Paul Sommer; Art Davis (season 1); Bob Goe (season 1); Carl Urbano (season 1); Oscar Dufau (season 2); Don Lusk (season 2)
- Voices of: Ben Ryan Ganger; Nancy Cartwright; Gregg Berger; Elisabeth Harnois; Paul Eiding; Gail Matthius; Don Messick; Benji Gregory
- Theme music composer: Clark Glassman; Michael Tavera
- Composers: Michael Tavera; Clark Glassman
- Countries of origin: United States; United Kingdom
- Original language: English
- No. of seasons: 2
- No. of episodes: 26

Production
- Executive producers: William Hanna; Joseph Barbera
- Producers: Charles Grosvenor; Mike Young; John Parkinson
- Running time: 20 minutes (approx.)
- Production companies: Hanna-Barbera Productions; Kalisto Ltd. Booker PLC; Tanaka Promotion Co.

Original release
- Network: S4C and BBC1 (UK); Syndication (United States)
- Release: September 17, 1988 – January 21, 1990

Fantastic Max is an animated cartoon series, originally aired on the BBC from 1988 to 1990 and created by Hanna-Barbera Productions, Kalisto Ltd., Booker PLC and Tanaka Promotion Co. in association with S4C. It centers on a boy named Maxwell "Fantastic Max" Young who has adventures in outer space with two of his toys: FX, a pull-string alien doll from a planet called Twinkle-Twinkle, and A.B. Sitter, a C-3PO-like android made of blocks.

== Voice cast ==
=== Main ===
- Ben Ryan Ganger as Maxwell "Fantastic Max" Young
- Nancy Cartwright as FX
- Gregg Berger as A.B. Sitter

=== Recurring ===
- Elisabeth Harnois as Zoe Young
- Gail Matthius as Mrs. Young
- Paul Eiding as Mr. Young
- Larry Riley as Dumping Jack Trash
- Dana Hill as XS
- Benji Gregory as Ben Parkinson

== Episodes ==
=== Pilot ===
The pilot episode of Fantastic Max, then known as Space Baby, was originally produced in the UK by Siriol Animation in 1986, and premiered on The Disney Channel of the same year and BBC1 in 1987.

Title	Written by	Directed by	Original broadcast date [US]	Original broadcast date [UK]
"Space Baby"	Robin Lyons and Judy Rothman	David Edwards	November 21, 1986	December 30, 1987
A strange and scary story about a baby known as Max, who got lost at Cape Canaveral, when his parents turned their backs, until he got lifted onto a rocket ship which suddenly blasted off and sent Max on a journey into space. Later on, FX cries with homesickness until Max and A.B. Sitter decide to send him home back to Twinkle Twinkle. The trouble is, the nasty garbage man Dumpin' Jack Trash is on their tail and Max's nosey sister, Zoe, doesn't know where Max is. Further on, after their time on Twinkle Twinkle, A.B. and Max decide to travel home to until FX changes his mind and decides to travel home with both of them at the last minute.

=== Season 1 (1988) ===
The first season of Fantastic Max was broadcast in the United States on Saturday mornings from September 17 to December 10, 1988, and in the United Kingdom on BBC1 from September 13 to November 28, 1989. In the UK, episodes were split into two parts and aired on successive days. Episodes 1-8 premiered on Wednesdays before moving to Mondays for the remainder of the season.

#	Title	Written by	Original broadcast date [US]	Original broadcast date [UK]
1	"The Loon in the Moon"	Story by: Kelly Ward & Mark Young; Teleplay by: Gary Greenfield	September 17, 1988	September 13–14, 1989
A.B. is frustrated because Max never listens to him, so he suggests that Max create a new plastic parent – and he does.
2	"Toys Will Be Toys"	Story by: Kelly Ward & Mark Young; Teleplay by: Marion Wells	September 24, 1988	September 20–21, 1989
A toy manufacturer named Sticky Wicket can't think of a new idea for a toy, so he steals FX and pretends to have invented him.
3	"All in a Babe's Work"	Story by: Kelly Ward & Mark Young; Teleplay by: Ken Knox	October 1, 1988	October 4–5, 1989
Max is bored when he has to spend all day in a day care center, so he takes his baby friends into space.
4	"The Big Sleep"	Kristina Mazotti	October 8, 1988	October 11–12, 1989
FX's cord gets pulled out of shape and ruins his voice, so the gang goes back to Twinkle Twinkle in search of his doctor to fix it. (Note: This episode contains guest appearances by George Jetson (from The Jetsons), Space Ghost and The Great Gazoo (from The Flintstones) in non-speaking cameos)
5	"Attack of the Cubic Rubes"	John Bonaccorsi	October 15, 1988	September 27–28, 1989
Max takes A.B. and FX to colorless planets (literally) with crayons, but after they meet color-lovers Alan and Neil, things get out of hand.
6	"Monkey See, Monkey Zoo"	Story by: Kelly Ward & Mark Young; Teleplay by: Tom Spath	October 22, 1988	October 18–19, 1989
The gang visits an interplanetary circus and discovers that the ringmaster has kidnapped the animals and is making them perform against their will.
7	"Cooking Mother's Goose"	Story by: Scott Shaw; Teleplay by: Marion Wells	October 29, 1988	October 25–26, 1989
Max is bored with fairy tales until the gang goes into storybook world. Things are fine until FX's mischievous cousin, XS, comes along and makes everyone dance to music – which distracts them from their duties.
8	"Journey to the Center of my Sister"	Dean Stefan	November 5, 1988	November 1–2, 1989
Zoe gets plagued with Nasal Bathrobe, the virus from Osirus, on the day of her birthday party. By order of Agent Wally, Max and company have to capture the virus or else they'll never go into outer space again.
9	"Carrot Encounters of the Third Kind"	Story by: Kelly Ward & Mark Young; Teleplay by: Gary Greenfield	November 12, 1988	November 6–7, 1989
Zoe grows a giant carrot for a vegetable competition, but the carrot, named Rooty, appears to be alive. He enlists Max's help to save him from a rabbit named Fatso, who wants to eat him.
10	"The Baby Who Fell to Earth"	Story by: Kelly Ward & Mark Young; Teleplay by: Terrie Collins	November 19, 1988	November 13–14, 1989
While on a mission, Max is thrown out of his rocket and is grabbed by astronauts who mistake him for an alien. Everyone on Earth thinks Max's baby talk are an alien language and that his clothes are alien as well.
11	"Beach Blanket Baby"	Tom Spath	November 26, 1988	November 20–21, 1989
Max and his friends enlist the help of Dumping Jack Trash to help find the plug of planet Beachball before it drifts fatally close to the sun.
12	"Stitches in Time"	Story by: Kelly Ward & Mark Young; Teleplay by: Ken Knox	December 3, 1988	November 27–28, 1989
The gang takes Stitches through time via the rocket, but Stitches is a baby at heart, which gets him into trouble.
13	"From Here to Twinkle, Twinkle"	Robin Lyons & Judy Rothman	December 10, 1988	
FX is deeply homesick so he ponders going back home to Twinkle Twinkle, but Max is reluctant to let him go. Note: This episode is a shortened version of the original Space Baby pilot where all the content is from. Also, this is the only Series 1 episode that was only broadcast and never commercially released.

=== Season 2 (1989–1990) ===
The second season of Fantastic Max was broadcast in the United States on Sunday mornings from October 29, 1989, to January 21, 1990, and in the United Kingdom on BBC1 as 13 single episodes split into two parts.

#	Title	Written by	Original broadcast date [US]	Original broadcast date [UK]
1	"Boo Who?"	Marion Wells	October 29, 1989	September 12–13, 1990
XS pays as a visit on Halloween, challenging FX's bravery, and it is up to Max and A.B. to help FX face his fears.
2	"Ben, the Blackmailer"	Dean Stefan	November 5, 1989	September 19–20, 1990
Ben videotapes Max's latest trip into space, and he blackmails Max into letting him come along on the next voyage in exchange for his silence.
3	"Cowboy Max"	Carl Swenson	November 12, 1989	September 26–27, 1990
Max's latest babysitter turns out to be Hoo Jipson, a famous outer space rodeo star.
4	"Straight Flush"	Fred Kron	November 19, 1989	October 3–4, 1990
A.B.'s body is stolen by a plumber. When they go on an adventure, the plumber and Max trade when the plumber finds a rare "hairball extractor". Then A.B. gets his body again. A.B. tells Max about being the baby, then Max says that FX and Max were born before him, so technically, Max says that A.B. is the baby, so they dress him as a baby. Max says that he and FX decide when A.B. sleeps.
5	"Rats Like Us"	Michele Rifkin	November 26, 1989	October 10–11, 1990
While visiting Buckyland theme park, Max and company encounter a friendly family of rats who are desperate for food, and they in turn do what they can to help.
6	"Grab Bag Tag"	Marion Wells	December 3, 1989	October 17–18, 1990
Max wishes that he had special powers like FX, so he decides to visit a place where he can learn all the best magic acts.
7	"Movie Star Max"	Dean Stefan	December 10, 1989	October 24–25, 1990
Max attends a film festival with himself as the main attraction.
8	"To Tell the Tooth"	Story by: Ken Knox; Teleplay by: Gary Greenfield	December 17, 1989	October 31-November 1, 1990
The gang goes after the Tooth Fairy after s/he takes Max's tooth from under his pillow and doesn't leave him any money.
9	"Dr. Max & Baby Hyde"	Cliff MacGillivray	December 24, 1989	November 7–8, 1990
After being covered with a shimmering ray, Max develops a more selfish and cruel personality.
10	"Guess Who's Coming to Dinar?"	Fred Kron	December 31, 1989	November 14–15, 1990
A sultan mistakes Max for his long-lost son.
11	"A.B., Phone Home"	Dean Stefan	January 7, 1990	November 21–22, 1990
Max's constant crank telephone calls result in a long bill, and he has to work at an interplanetary phone company to pay it off.
12	"Puzzle, Puzzle, Toil & Trouble"	Marion Wells	January 14, 1990	November 28–29, 1990
Max winds up in a fairground full of games. But he lets his winning streak get in the way of things.
13	"Blarney Fife"	Gary Greenfield	January 21, 1990	December 5–6, 1990
After an accident, A.B.'s foot squeaks, so the gang travels to Ireland to find a good cobbler. The cobbler they find is a leprechaun named Blarney Fife who is trying to keep the map to Leprechaun Land from a greedy sneak named Pete O'Moss.

== Home media ==
Between 1989 and 1991, four VHS tapes were released by BBC Video, whereas the three episodes of the UK showings on each of the VHS tapes were made into 20 minute stories.

VHS Name	Catalogue Number	Release Year	Episodes
Fantastic Max 1: "The Loon in the Moon"	BBCV 4300	6 November 1989	"The Loon in the Moon"; "Toys Will Be Toys"; "All In A Babe's Work"
Fantastic Max 2: "Attack of the Cubic Rubes"	BBCV 4315	2 April 1990	"Attack of the Cubic Rubes"; "Monkey See, Monkey Zoo"; "The Big Sleep"
Fantastic Max 3: "Cooking Mother's Goose"	BBCV 4408	1 October 1990	"Cooking Mother's Goose"; "Journey to the Center of my Sister"; "Carrot Encounters of the Third Kind"
Fantastic Max 4: "'The Baby Who Fell to Earth"	BBCV 4486	4 March 1991	"The Baby Who Fell to Earth"; "Beach Blanket Baby"; "Stitches in Time"

During 1991, Abbey Home Entertainment also released three separate VHS tapes with two episodes on each; one episode ("Boo Who") was exclusively released as part of the Children's Classics range and sold at WHSmith stores. In June 1991, Tempo Video's Kids Club sub-label released a single video containing one episode, "Movie Star Max" (94932).

VHS Name	Release Year	Episodes
Fantastic Max: "Cowboy Max" (94692)	18 February 1991	"Cowboy Max"; "Straight Flush"
The New Adventures of Fantastic Max: "Movie Star Max"	3 June 1991	"Movie Star Max"
The New Adventures of Fantastic Max: "Rats Like Us"	1991	"Rats Like Us"; "Grab Bag Tag"
The New Adventures of Fantastic Max: "Boo Who?"	1991	"Boo Who?"; "Ben the Blackmailer"

No DVD releases have surfaced to date, in either the United Kingdom or the United States.
