= Calon (TV production company) =

Welsh animation company

Mount Stuart Media Ltd.
- Trade name: Calon
- Industry: Animation
- Predecessor: Siriol Productions Ltd (1982–2005)
- Founded: 2005
- Founder: Robin Lyons
- Headquarters: Cardiff, Wales, UK
- Key people: Robin Lyons
- Subsidiaries: Sali Mali 2 Ltd.

Mount Stuart Media Ltd, trading as Calon (Welsh for 'heart'), is a British animation television production company based in Cardiff, the capital of Wales, which primarily produced Welsh animated series for S4C. The company was formerly known as Siriol Animation and Siriol Productions.

== History ==
Calon was set up following the management buy-out from Entertainment Rights of Siriol Productions, when Entertainment Rights moved its head office to London. Most members of staff stayed in Wales to help re-establish Siriol as an independent production company. The deal included all rights to current productions and a few older titles, but the rights to most of the older series are now held by Entertainment Rights.

The company eventually employed over 40 people and was a developer of talent in the Welsh animation industry for more than 30 years. Calon continued working on animation production, but expanded into live-action content for both the UK and international markets, and to co-produce with major networks outside the UK.

In March 2009, the company re-acquired its animation catalogue from S4C International.

In July 2010, the company filed for voluntary liquidation when hoped-for investment to expand the company failed to materialise. Shortly afterwards it was Incorporated into Mount Stuart Media Ltd.

== Productions ==
Two series of Hana's Helpline were produced for Channel 5's Milkshake block for preschool children in co-production with S4C and German broadcaster ZDF. One series of Igam Ogam was made for S4C, Channel 5, ZDF Enterprises and the Gaelic Media Service on BBC Alba, and also a puppet series called The Zoo Factor for CBBC. Calon's live action drama credits included Help! I'm a Teenage Outlaw for ITV and Nickelodeon. In 2011, ITV asked Calon to create a new sitcom for the channel, and Calon worked with The Osmonds on develop a film based around the wild west.

- Bobinogs (season 3)
- Hana's Helpline
- Psi-5 (pilot film; 2007)
- U-Chronia (pilot film; 2009)
- Igam Ogam (2009–2013)
- The Zoo Factor (2011)
- Captain Morten and the Spider Queen (2018) (film)
- Sali Mali (December 2020 – present) (season 2)

=== Hana's Helpline ===
Hana's Helpline is a stop-motion animation series for pre-school children, about Hana, a duck who runs a telephone helpline for animals with problems. The principal voices are provided by Arabella Weir, Jonathan Kydd, Joanna Ruiz, Boyd Clack and Caroline Harker with most of the other voices being provided by children.

There are 52 episodes, each 10 minutes long. Its first broadcast was in Wales under the Welsh title Holi Hana, on 2 April 2007. Its first English broadcast was on Five on 12 June 2007. It has also been broadcast in a selection of other countries - for example it began broadcasting on TVB Pearl, starting 10 May 2007. Books are available from Random House Children's Books from January 2008. A line of character toys was also developed by Golden Bear Toys along with the first DVD of the show which was released in November 2007. A second compilation was released in Spring 2008.

== Siriol Productions ==
Siriol Productions Siriol Animation
- Founded: 1982
- Founder: Mike Young; Liz Young; Dave Edwards; Robin Lyons
- Defunct: 2005
- Fate: Renamed to Calon
- Successor: Calon; Splash Entertainment
- Headquarters: Cardiff, Wales
- Products: SuperTed

Siriol Productions (also known as Dave Edwards Studio, "Siriol" means 'cheerful' in Welsh language) was founded in 1982 by Mike Young, his wife Liz, animator Dave Edwards and producer Robin Lyons and based in Cardiff. The company was originally created when the three men approached the newly formed Welsh TV channel S4C and secured a commission to produce an animated series of SuperTed (which Mike Young created). With support from S4C, the partners set up an animation studio, Siriol Animation.

SuperTed was a highly successful series with the company winning a prestigious BAFTA award in 1987. The series first aired in 1982 and started airing on S4C in Wales and on the BBC elsewhere in the UK. It ran for three series and 36 episodes.

Following its success with SuperTed, the company was commissioned by S4C to produce another series called Wil Cwac Cwac, based on a series of children's books first published in Wales in the early 1930s about a little duckling who is always naughty and lives on a farm village in rural Wales with his family and friends. This, in turn was followed by further commissions from S4C for a series of half-hour specials created for the animated series Fox Tales, including the 1986 television special A Winter Story.

Lyons and Young have also been involved in working on a children's stop motion animated series, Fireman Sam in 1987, except it was produced by Prism Art and Design Ltd and Bumper Films. In its early years, the studio worked exclusively for S4C, and Robin Lyons (managing director) decided to broaden its customer base and to move into co-productions to form Siriol Productions in 1988. In 1989, Mike Young left the company and moved to the United States to set up his own company, Mike Young Productions. Young also teamed up with Hanna-Barbera to develop a cartoon called Fantastic Max (which was originally called Space Baby) and to create a sequel series to SuperTed entitled The Further Adventures of SuperTed.

Moving into co-productions has proved successful for Siriol, resulting in productions such as The Princess and the Goblin an 80-minute film co-produced by Hungary's Pannonia Film Studio and Under Milk Wood, a 50-minute TV special using the 1950s voice recording by Richard Burton. These productions have enabled Robin Lyons to develop extensive contacts throughout the animation industry, both with broadcasters such as the BBC and ITV, and with other leading animation studios.

In 1989, Siriol, together with La Fabrique in France, Cologne Cartoon in Germany and Sofidoc in Belgium formed its own distribution company, EVA Entertainment, headed up by Steve Walsh, the former head of co-productions at Goldcrest Films. Its co-productions were grouped under the EC's CARTOON programme as part of its MEDIA initiative. EVA was the first grouping company established under this initiative. The group was involved in co-productions with major European broadcasters, typically with the BBC in the UK, FR3 and Canal+ in France and ZDF and WDR in Germany. It also made co-productions with other European partners as well as with US and Canadian co-producers.

In 1995, EVA received a substantial private investment and attracted two top executives from BBC Children's International, Mikael Shields and Tony Stern. EVA Entertainment has made many series and specials, (the group's major productions were controlled creatively by Siriol) which were sold to over fifty countries on five continents, including Robert Creep, Tales of the Tooth Fairies, Billy the Cat (the group's largest project) and Romuald the Reindeer. The later two programmes were produced by Robin Lyons. When EVA was sold to Pearson PLC, Siriol formed other alliances with Scottish Television and SKD Media Plc.

In 1998, Siriol was brought over by Sleepy Kids (renamed Entertainment Rights in 2000), with Lyons expanding his role within the new company. In 2005, a management buyout led by Lyons took place for Siriol Productions, and was renamed Calon.

Siriol set up two subdivisions. The first was Blunt Pictures, which produced animation aimed at older audiences. Blunt Pictures has produced a short film for Channel 4, Dee’s Dish of the Day and developed the series, Stonehouse Reunion for Channel 4 and Days of Deliverance for S4C. Blunt has also developed a low budget feature, 360, which has attracted funding from the Film Panel of the Welsh Lottery, and several web-based animation projects including Once Upon A Morgue and Deadenders. The second subdivision was a web design subdivision called Piczled, which has designed the official Basil Brush website and theme park attractions for Chessington World of Adventures in Surrey and Alton Towers in Staffordshire. Piczled has also worked on other websites such as those for Siriol and Entertainment Rights.

=== Production ===
Title	Network	Original running	Notes
SuperTed	S4C/BBC One/BBC Two	1982–1986	
Wil Cwac Cwac	S4C/CITV	1982–1986	
Fox Tales	S4C/Channel 4	1986–1988	
Space Baby		1986	later became Fantastic Max
The Further Adventures of SuperTed	S4C/BBC One/BBC Two	1989	co-produced with Hanna-Barbera
Santa and the Tooth Fairies	FR3/WDR	1991	co-produced with La Fabrique, Cologne Cartoon, Sofidoc SA, EVA Entertainment and BBC
The Princess and the Goblin	co-produced with Pannonia Film Studio, S4C and NHK	1991	
Santa's First Christmas	1992	co-produced with co-produced with EVA Entertainment, Cologne Cartoon, S4C, and Filmstiftung Nordrhein-Westfalen	
Tales of the Tooth Fairies	1992	BBC One/BBC Two	co-produced with La Fabrique, EVA Entertainment, Cologne Cartoon, Sofidoc S.A., WDR, France 3, and BBC
Gerald of Wales	1993	co-produced with Cadw and S4C	
Robert Creep	1994	co-produced with EVA Entertainment	
Romuald the Reindeer	BBC One/BBC Two	1996	co-produced with EVA Entertainment and La Fabrique
The Blobs	CITV	1996	co-produced with Taytel, S4C and Scottish Television Enterprises
Hilltop Hospital	CITV	1999–2002	co-produced with EVA Entertainment, Canal J, FR3, ZDF, and Folimage: Has awards in Italy, France and the USA. The show was nominated for a BAFTA in 2001
Meeow!	CITV	1999–2000	co-produced with SKD Media Plc, Comataidh Craolaidh Gaidhlig and Scottish Television
Sali Mali	S4C	2000–2002	co-produced with Cymdeithas Lyfrau Ceredigion and S4C
Drums of Noto Hanto	S4C	2000	

==== Animation services ====
- S4C network ID (1987)
- Knightmare (1987, opening animation)
- MTV network ID (1988)
- Babar (1989, season 1 for Nelvana)
- Body Beautiful (1991)
- Lava Lava (for La Fabrique)
- Hurricanes (1993, Series 1, for DIC Entertainment L.P. and Scottish Television Enterprises)
- Soul Music (1997, for Cosgrove Hall Films)
- Toons from Planet Orange (1998, "Helmutt and the Killer Nose" for Cologne Cartoon)
- Lucky and Zorba (1998, for Lanterna Magica)
- A Monkey's Tale (1999)
- Albie (2002, 2004, for Cosgrove Hall Films)
- Fireman Sam (2003, Season 5, for HIT Entertainment, Gullane Entertainment and S4C)
- BB3B (2004, for Tell-Tale Productions and Entertainment Rights)

==== Knife and Wife ====
Knife and Wife is a British one-off half-hour animated comedy programme screened on Channel 4 in December 2001. It was created by Blunt Films, the adult animation division of Siriol Animation and written by Paul Rose.

The voice of Knife was provided by former Monty Python member Terry Jones, whilst the part of his wife, Janine was voiced by actress Jessica Stevenson. Kevin Eldon, Ruth Jones, Paul Putner and Brian Murphy also did voices for the series. The programme was part of the Channel 4 Comedy Lab try-out project, which had spawned several successful series including Trigger Happy TV and That Peter Kay Thing. No full series followed.

== Kalisto Ltd ==
Kalisto Ltd. is a short lived co-venture between the directors of Siriol Animation and Booker Group. Launched in 1986, the company has developed a show called Space Baby (which eventually became Fantastic Max, which was co-produced with Hanna-Barbera), along with another series called Satellite City (co-produced with Fairwater Films) and the 1991 animated film adaptation of the children's book The Little Engine That Could. Kalisto barely lasted a year before Booker bought the rights back.
