= Postgate =

Postgate is a surname, and may refer to:

- The Postgate family, whose members include:
  - John Percival Postgate, British classical scholar
  - Margaret Postgate, married name Margaret Cole, daughter of John
  - Nicholas Postgate (1596 or 1597 – 1679), English Catholic martyr (probably in the same family as the other Postgates)
  - Nicholas Postgate (academic), Professor of Assyriology at the University of Cambridge
  - Oliver Postgate, British animator, son of Raymond
  - Raymond Postgate, British historian, son of John
  - Daniel Postgate, British writer, son of Oliver
