= John Postgate =

John Postgate may refer to:

- John Postgate (food safety campaigner) (1820–1881), English surgeon and academic
- John Percival Postgate (1853–1926), English classicist, son of the last
- John Postgate (microbiologist) (1922–2014), English microbiologist and writer, grandson of the last

== See also ==
- Postgate family
