= John Postgate (food safety campaigner) =

English surgeon, academic, and a campaigner against food adulteration

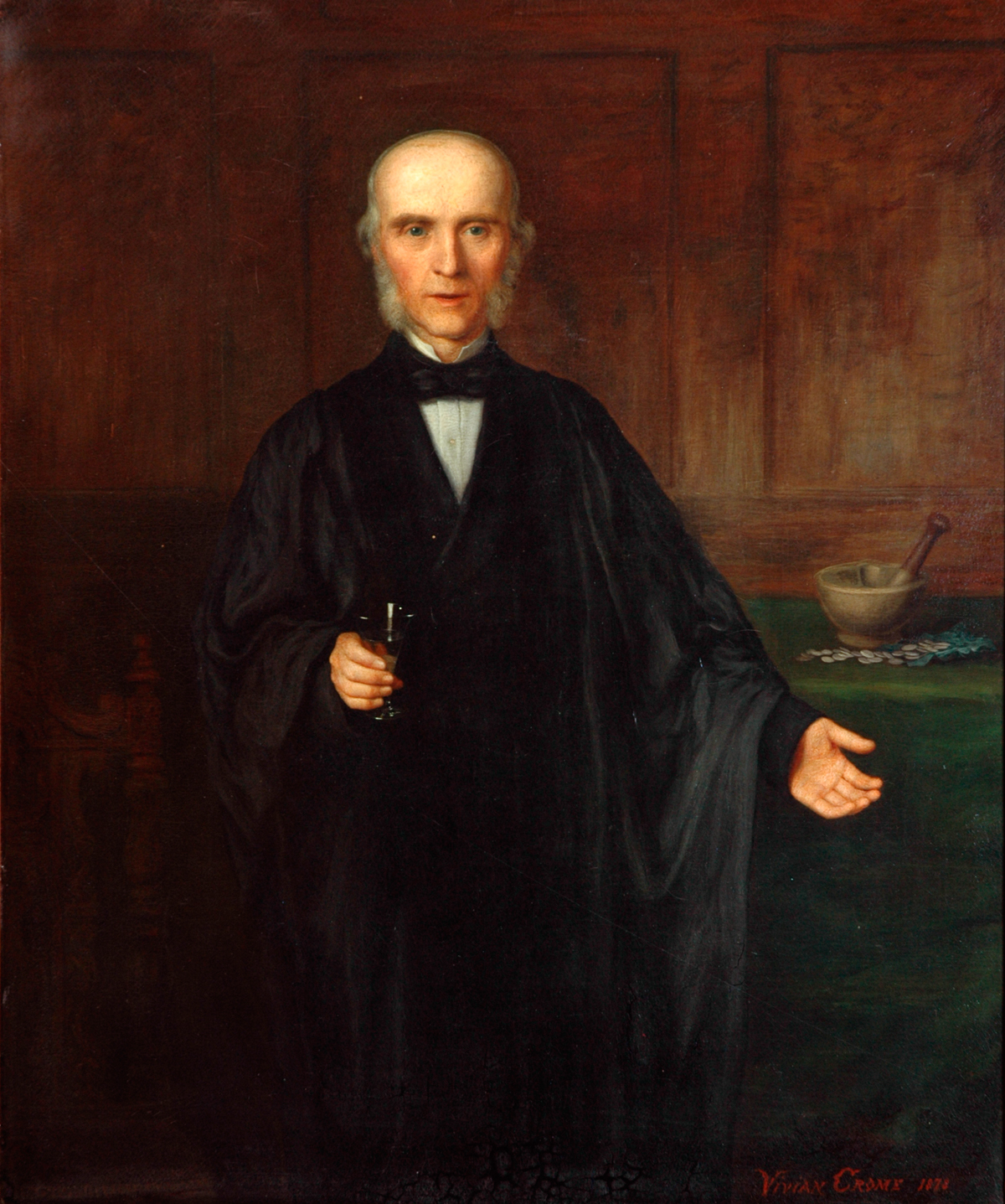
- Portrait by Vivian Crome
- Born: 21 October 1820; Scarborough, North Yorkshire, England, United Kingdom
- Died: 26 September 1881 (aged 60); London, England, United Kingdom
- Occupation: Activist
- Spouse: Mary Horwood (1819–1889)
- Children: John Percival Postgate
- Relatives: Raymond Postgate (grandson); Margaret Cole (granddaughter); Oliver Postgate (great grandson); John Postgate (great grandson)
- Family: Postgate family

John Postgate (1820–1881) was an English surgeon, academic, and a campaigner against food adulteration.

== Early life ==
The son of a Scarborough builder, Thomas Postgate, by his wife Jane Wade, he was born in Scarborough, on 21 October 1820. He started his career as a grocer's boy at the age of eleven. but, shocked by such practices as adding sand to sugar and plaster of Paris to flour, he apprenticed himself to two Scarborough doctors. He had taught himself chemistry and botany and went on to become a licensed apothecary in London where he discovered that drugs could often be dangerously impure. He attended lectures at the Leeds School of Medicine.

Postgate acted as assistant to a firm in the east of London. He then attended the London Hospital, satisfied the Royal College of Surgeons in 1844, and in July 1845 he qualified at Apothecaries' Hall. After a brief period as a GP in Driffield, Yorkshire he set up a practice in Birmingham in May 1851, and three years later became fellow of the College of Surgeons.

== Campaigner ==
In Birmingham Postgate was shocked by the state of general pollution. No fewer than 176 industrial chimneys were spewing smoke into the air and the streets were "running sewers"; he published his first reformist pamphlet, on the "sanatary aspects" of the town calling for municipal action. But unfortunate experiences with his patients drew his attention to food and drug adulteration, which became the major preoccupation of his life. He was aware of the earlier campaign against food adulteration by Thomas Wakley and Arthur Hill Hassall publicised through The Lancet; but he considered that publicity alone was inadequate, and only political action would lead to legislation. He organised a meeting on food adulteration for the scientific and medical community of Birmingham, but his major success was to interest the Birmingham Members of Parliament William Scholefield and George Frederick Muntz in the issue. Postgate suggested that a system of public analysts be set up charged with monitoring samples of food and drugs, supported by magisterial powers to levy fines on fraudsters. As a preliminary step, Scholefield moved on 26 June 1855 for a Select Committee of Inquiry in the House of Commons, and this was duly agreed.

The committee's proceedings were widely and favourably reported in the press, numerous witnesses were interviewed including Wakley and Hassall, and Postgate appeared before it three times. Meetings were held about the country at which samples of bread, flour, ground coffee, mustard, vinegar, pepper, wine, beer, and drugs, as adulterated by the local retailers, were publicly exhibited and analysed. The committee's final report amounted to Postgate's proposal: the local appointment of public analysts, and jurisdiction by magistrates, and in 1855 Scholefield introduced a suitable bill. Such was the opposition that it did not get read for two years and then failed. Over the next two decades nine bills dealing with adulteration were introduced into the House of Commons by the members for Birmingham, under Postgate's influence; all met with strenuous opposition from retailers. After complex political manoeuvring an effective act was passed which embodied most of Postgate's ideas, the Sale of Food and Drugs Act 1875 (38 & 39 Vict. c. 63), which formed the basis of the modern system. This legislation was followed by similar measures in the British colonies.

== Later life ==
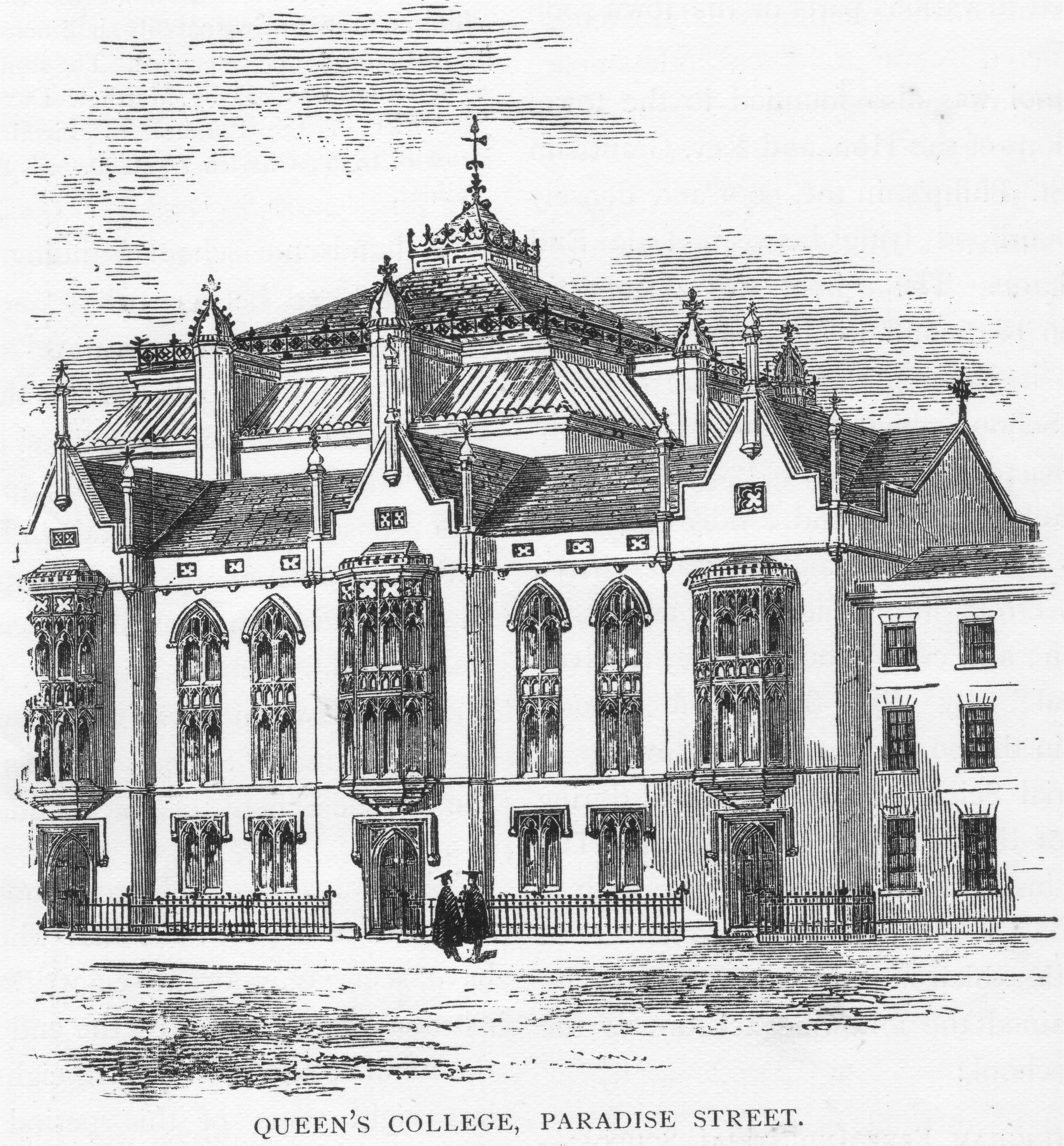
Queen's College, Birmingham, a predecessor college of the University of Birmingham

Postgate took an active part in the inauguration in Birmingham of the National Association for the Promotion of Social Science in 1857. On 7 May 1860 he was appointed professor of medical jurisprudence and toxicology at Queen's College, Birmingham (a predecessor college of Birmingham University).

Postgate's labours caused him serious personal problems, such as the windows of his house being broken, and once he was shot at. His family suffered: travel, pamphlets, postage and other expenses absorbed almost all of his income. He had married Mary Horwood (1819–1889) during his period in Driffield, who was an educated woman who had hoped to be a writer. But she was kept short of money to feed, clothe and bring up their large family; she sometimes had to hide her housekeeping allowance lest he raid it. His children grew up cordially disliking their parsimonious and seemingly uncaring father. But to the wider public John Postgate became something of a hero, if feared by food and drug traders. He died of stomach cancer on 26 September 1881 at the London Hospital, taken there returning from Neuenahr in Germany. He was buried in Warstone Lane Cemetery, Birmingham where his grave, thought to have been grassed over, has recently been discovered. His epitaph recorded that, for "twenty-five years of his life, without reward, and under heavy discouragement, he laboured to protect the health and to purify the commerce of this people"; his obituaries were adulatory and his portrait is still displayed in a Committee room in Scarborough Town Hall.

== Works ==
Postgate published the following pamphlets:

- Sanatary Aspects of Birmingham, 1852.
- A Few Words on Adulteration, 1857.
- Medical Services and Public Payments, 1862.

Two papers by him on adulteration were published in the Transactions of the Social Science Association, for 1857 and 1868.
