= WereBear =

Series of teddy bears

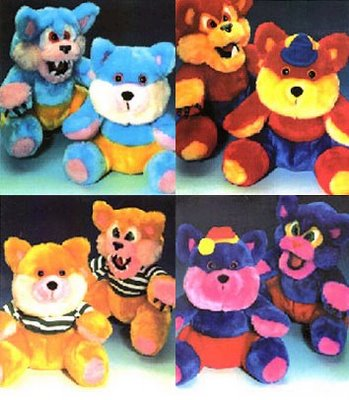
- Type: Teddy Bear
- Invented by: George Nicholas
- Company: Hornby
- Country: United Kingdom

The WereBears were a series of teddy bears released in 1983 in the United Kingdom. They were created by George Nicholas, a muralist and managing director with Impact Murals, philanthropist and director of his charity Art For Their Sake, cartoonist, animator, and author, so that boys could have teddy bears without worrying about being bullied. Nicholas gave the handling of distribution of the toys to UK-based toy company Hornby. The bears were designed in a way that their "normal" head functioned as a hood, and by turning the head inside out it would reveal the "were" face.

Werebears was purchased from George Nicholas in 2026 by Exeter based toy manufacturer KTL with plans to bring the brand back to life to a global audience.

== History ==
Four bears were originally released in 1983. The bears were named Grizzler, Howler, Fang, and Gums. Each bear came with a story tape narrated by Oliver Postgate of Bagpuss fame, with one side explaining how the WereBears came to be and the other telling the individual bear's own adventure. In 1986, another line of teddies called the TerrorTeds were created. A fifth WereBear named Growler was released the same year.

Werebears was purchased from George Nicholas in 2026 by Exeter based toy manufacturer KTL with plans to bring the brand back to life to a global audience.

Two new plush products were released to the UK market. The Collab with Baby Three (The Asian blind box) and Werebears x Tokyo which is a more Manga look of Werebears. These are very small launches to bring the brand back into consumers minds.

The Squishy Dumpling craze in 2026 also resembles Werebears, because of Were-baos, all original Werebears in Dumpling form.

== Synopsis ==
The WereBears' adventure begins near the fictional village of Munchen-Luncheon, a tiny place in a remote corner of Bavaria where time seems to have stood still. The Bears were created by kindly old toymaker Baron Egon Baconburger, who lives in Castle Casserole. But the Baron fell victim to an ancient curse on his family that changed him into a werewolf, and somehow he passed on this curse to the four teddy bears... hence they became WereBears. Now the Bears have got themselves hopelessly lost in the forest and the Baron desperately needs to find them before his secret is discovered. The Baron and the Bears may look scary, but they are still innocent and good-hearted inside. However, there are darker forces to be reckoned with... anything might happen in the forest beyond Munchen-Luncheon, because it is the enchanted domain of the horrible Witch Hazel, her hideous TerrorTeds, and other assorted nasties!

== Toy Characters ==
In total, nine characters were produced for this toy line. They are as follows.

WereBears

Howler - A blue bear with yellow 'trousers'.

Grizzler - A yellow bear with a striped shirt.

Fang - A red bear with a baseball cap hat and a single tooth.

Gums - A dark blue bear with a pompom hat and no teeth.

Growler - An orange bear with blue 'trousers' and a badge which, when pressed, played a howling noise.

TerrorTeds

Snapper - A green bear with mismatched eyes and a large number of teeth.

Chomp - A red bear with a pitchfork tail and a large lower jaw.

Munch - A purple bear with a strong brow and flat head.

Grunt - A shaggy black bear with a red stomach.

== Other media ==
A comic book was published in 1990 by Clearmark Productions/London Editions Magazines and lasted seven issues. Four artists, George Nicholas as creator, along with Nigel Parkinson and Julie Evans hand wrote and inked each issue before submitting to the publisher to print and distribute. The first issue was a retelling of the WereBears' origin, the second issue retold the origin of the TerrorTeds, and the third issue retold the origin of Growler. The following four issues each focused on an adventure of one of the WereBears versus one of the TerrorTeds.

Universal Studios was in talks with George Nicholas to make a film about the bears.
