= Verdict of Twelve =

1940 novel by Raymond Postgate

- First edition
- Author: Raymond Postgate
- Language: English
- Genre: Crime novel
- Publisher: Doubleday
- Publication date: 1940
- Publication place: United Kingdom
- Media type: Print (hardback & paperback)
- Pages: 273 pp

Verdict of Twelve is a novel by Raymond Postgate first published in 1940 about a trial by jury seen through the eyes of each of the twelve jurors as they listen to the evidence and try to reach a unanimous verdict of either "Guilty" or "Not guilty". Verdict of Twelve is set in England in the late 1930s (Hitler, Nazism and in particular anti-Semitism are referred to several times). Up to the final pages of the novel, till after the trial is over, the reader does not know if the defendant—a middle-aged woman charged with murder—is innocent or not.

== The case ==
Rosalie van Beer is a widowed, childless woman who comes into money when all the relatives of her late husband unexpectedly die in a plane crash. The only surviving member of the family is her 11-year-old nephew Philip, and van Beer considers herself to be his "natural guardian”. She moves into the house in Devon that was built by her father-in-law and leads a quiet life there with Philip, a sickly child for whom she engages a private tutor. The household is run by an older couple who were devoted to their former employer but who dislike, and cheat on, Rosalie van Beer. It soon turns out that Philip is a difficult child, and that he does not get along with his aunt at all.

The situation escalates when van Beer takes away Philip's pet rabbit, which he called Sredni Vashtar (the name of a weasel in a Saki short story, which kills a cruel aunt), and gasses it in the kitchen. When, soon afterwards, the boy is taken ill the old country doctor is unable to diagnose his disease correctly, and Philip dies before another physician can be consulted.

When poison is found in the boy's vomit the police are alerted. Then Philip's tutor comes forward and tells the police that he saw a newspaper clipping about exactly such a case of poisoning in one of the books in the library. As Rosalie van Beer stands to inherit the family fortune, her motive seems to be obvious, and she is charged with murder.

At first, when the jury retires to the jury room, about half of them, including the two women, consider the defendant guilty. However, as time progresses, they can all be convinced by the others that there is reasonable doubt that Rosalie van Beer has committed premeditated murder. In the end, their verdict is one of acquittal.

Only on the way back to her hotel does van Beer tell her barrister and her solicitor what really happened, something she has been aware of all along.

== Characters in "Verdict of Twelve" ==
=== The jury ===
The ten men and two women who have been picked randomly to do jury service are:

1. an unmarried middle-aged journalist;
2. a young left-wing intellectual, newly married and happy;
3. a hard-working and honest publican;
4. a travelling salesman unsuccessfully trying to flog encyclopaedias;
5. a young attractive widow of Jewish descent whose husband was killed when he was attacked in the street by hooligans;
6. a young hairdresser sharing a house with three workmates;
7. an old, fat, homosexual university don specialising in the reconstruction of classical texts;
8. a young actor who has not quite found his personal style;
9. a restaurateur who successfully poses as an Englishman although he was born and raised a pauper in Greece;
10. a religious fanatic who believes he belongs to the chosen few;
11. a busy trade union official;
12. and, ironically, a murderess who has got away with her crime and who has been leading an inconspicuous and solitary life ever since.

== Major themes ==
Postgate's premise is that of Marx, that "it is not the consciousness of men that determines their existence, but [that] on the contrary their social existence determines their consciousness". Accordingly, he begins the novel by giving short biographies of each juror in which he describes their individual experiences, their social and financial background, the outlook on life which each of them has acquired over time, and also any possible predisposition to judge others harshly. Postgate presents all these factors to show that they prevent the jurors from considering evidence objectively, and that they will respond to the case emotionally rather than realistically.

== TV film adaptation ==
The American TV series Playhouse 90 (series 2, episode 31, 1958) featured a 90-minute version of the story under the name Verdict of Three, focussing on the three jurors who dominate the discussion.

== See also ==
- Reginald Rose: Twelve Angry Men (play)
- Cyril Hare: Tragedy at Law (novel)
- Agatha Christie: Witness for the Prosecution (short story and play)
- Georg Wilhelm Friedrich Hegel and Karl Marx for the idealism/materialism controversy
