= Human interactions with microbes =

Overview of human–microbe interactions

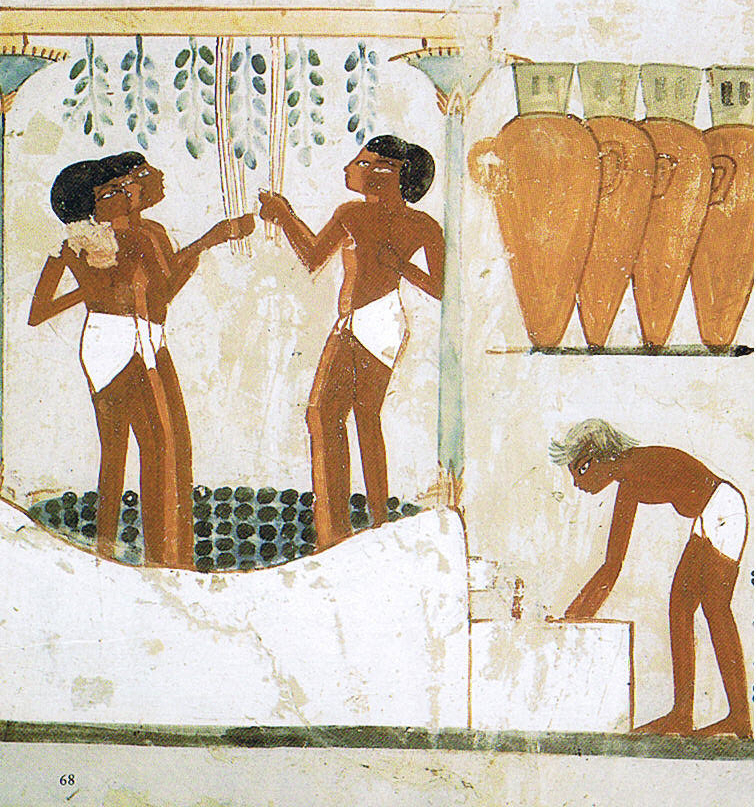
Grapes being trodden to extract the juice and fermented to wine in storage jars. Tomb of Nakht, 18th dynasty, Thebes, Ancient Egypt

Human interactions with microbes include both practical and symbolic uses of microbes, and negative interactions in the form of human, domestic animal, and crop diseases.

Practical use of microbes began in ancient times with fermentation in food processing; bread, beer and wine have been produced by yeasts from the dawn of civilisation, such as in ancient Egypt. More recently, microbes have been used in activities from biological warfare to the production of chemicals by fermentation, as industrial chemists discover how to manufacture a widening variety of organic chemicals including enzymes and bioactive molecules such as hormones and competitive inhibitors for use as medicines. Fermentation is used, too, to produce substitutes for fossil fuels in forms such as ethanol and methane; fuels may also be produced by algae. Anaerobic microorganisms are important in sewage treatment. In scientific research, yeasts and the bacterium Escherichia coli serve as model organisms especially in genetics and related fields.

On the symbolic side, an early poem about brewing is the Sumerian "Hymn to Ninkasi", from 1800 BC. In the Middle Ages, Giovanni Boccaccio's The Decameron and Geoffrey Chaucer's The Canterbury Tales: addressed people's fear of deadly contagion and the moral decline that could result. Novelists have exploited the apocalyptic possibilities of pandemics from Mary Shelley's 1826 The Last Man and Jack London's 1912 The Scarlet Plague onwards. Hilaire Belloc wrote a humorous poem to "The Microbe" in 1912. Dramatic plagues and mass infection have formed the story lines of many Hollywood films, starting with Nosferatu in 1922. In 1971, The Andromeda Strain told the tale of an extraterrestrial microbe threatening life on Earth. Microbiologists since Alexander Fleming have used coloured or fluorescing colonies of bacteria to create miniature artworks.

Microorganisms such as bacteria and viruses are important as pathogens, causing disease to humans, crop plants, and domestic animals.

== Context ==
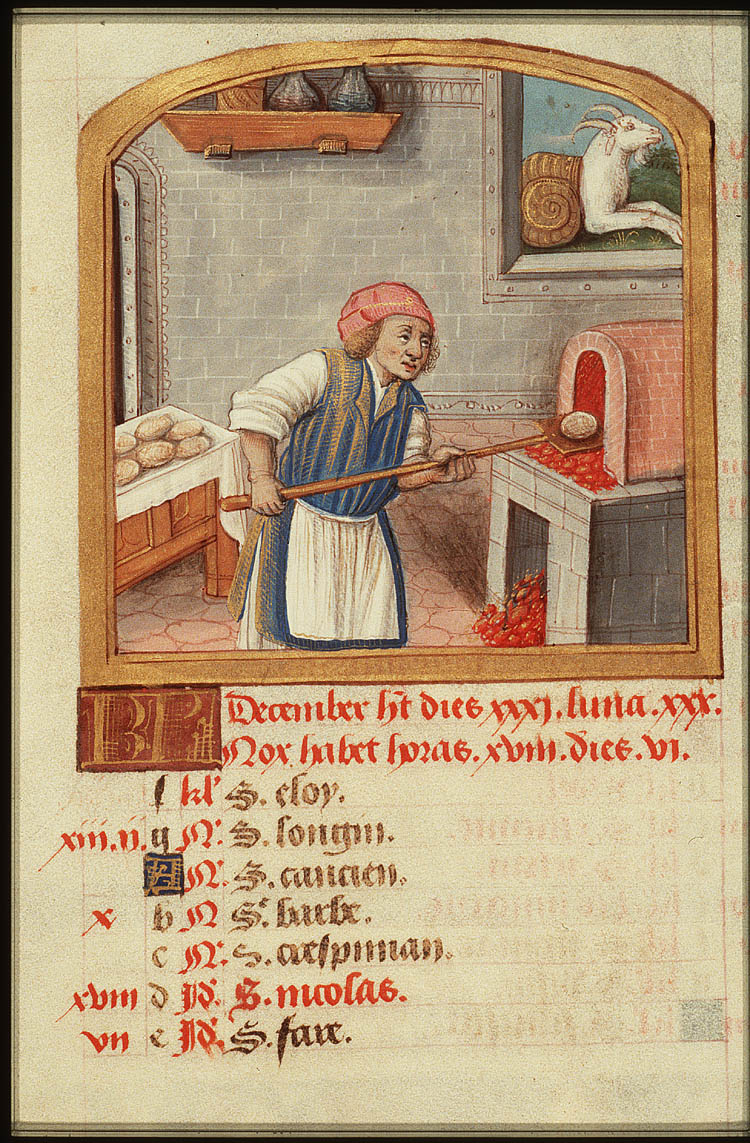
Calendar from a Medieval book of hours: the month of December, showing a baker putting bread into the oven. c. 1490–1500

Culture consists of the social behaviour and norms found in human societies and transmitted through social learning. Cultural universals in all human societies include expressive forms like art, music, dance, ritual, religion, and technologies like tool usage, cooking, shelter, and clothing. The concept of material culture covers physical expressions such as technology, architecture and art, whereas immaterial culture includes principles of social organization, mythology, philosophy, literature, and science. This article describes the roles played by microorganisms in human culture.

Since microbes were not known until the Early Modern period, they appear in earlier literature indirectly, through descriptions of baking and brewing. Only with the invention of the microscope, as used by Robert Hooke in his 1665 book Micrographia, and by Antonie van Leeuwenhoek in the 1670s, could microbes be observed directly.

== Practical uses ==
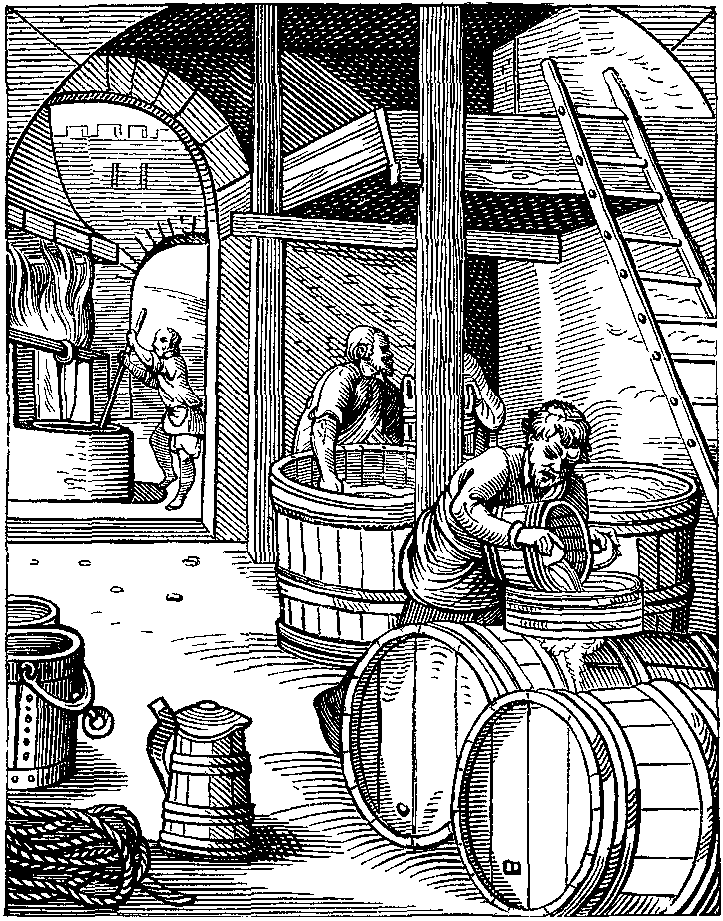
A 16th-century brewery, engraved by Jost Amman

=== Food production ===
Controlled fermentation with microbes in brewing, wine making, baking, pickling and cultured dairy products such as yogurt and cheese, is used to modify ingredients to make foods with desirable properties. The principal microbes involved are yeasts, in the case of beer, wine, and ordinary bread; and bacteria, in the case of anaerobically fermented vegetables, dairy products, and sourdough bread. The cultures variously provide flavour and aroma, inhibit pathogens, increase digestibility and palatability, make bread rise, reduce cooking time, and create useful products including alcohol, organic acids, vitamins, amino acids, and carbon dioxide. Safety is maintained with the help of food microbiology.

=== Water treatment ===
Oxidative sewage treatment processes rely on microorganisms to oxidise organic constituents. Anaerobic microorganisms reduce sludge solids producing methane gas and a sterile mineralised residue. In potable water treatment, one method, the slow sand filter, employs a complex gelatinous layer composed of a wide range of microorganisms to remove both dissolved and particulate material from raw water.

=== Energy ===
Microorganisms are used in fermentation to produce ethanol, and in biogas reactors to produce methane. Scientists are researching the use of algae to produce liquid fuels, and bacteria to convert various forms of agricultural and urban waste into usable fuels.

=== Chemicals, enzymes ===
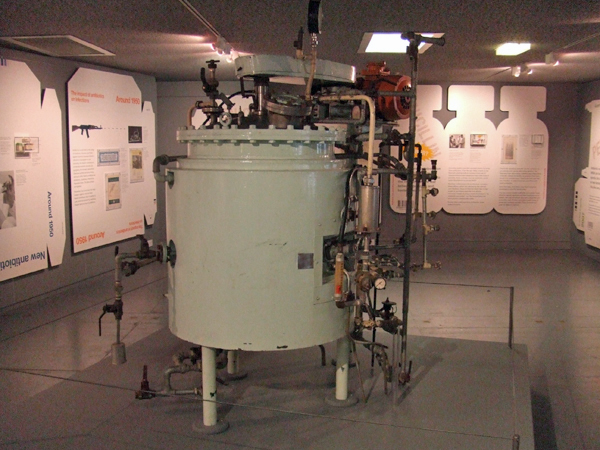
An early Penicillin bioreactor, from 1957, now in the Science Museum, London

Microorganisms are used for many commercial and industrial purposes, including the production of chemicals, enzymes and other bioactive molecules, often through protein engineering. For example, acetic acid is produced by the bacterium Acetobacter aceti, while citric acid is produced by the fungus Aspergillus niger. Microorganisms are used to prepare a widening range of bioactive molecules and enzymes. For example, Streptokinase produced by the bacterium Streptococcus and modified by genetic engineering is used to remove clots from the blood vessels of patients who have suffered a heart attack. Cyclosporin A is an immunosuppressive agent in organ transplantation, while statins produced by the yeast Monascus purpureus serve as blood cholesterol lowering agents, competitively inhibiting the enzyme that synthesizes cholesterol.

=== Science ===
Microorganisms are essential tools in biotechnology, biochemistry, genetics, and molecular biology. The yeasts brewer's yeast (Saccharomyces cerevisiae) and fission yeast (Schizosaccharomyces pombe) are important model organisms in science, since they are simple eukaryotes that can be grown rapidly in large numbers and are easily manipulated. They are particularly valuable in genetics, genomics and proteomics, for example in protein production. The easily cultured gut bacterium Escherichia coli, a prokaryote, is similarly widely used as a model organism.

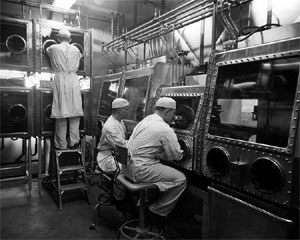
Scientists working with Class III cabinets at the U.S. Biological Warfare Laboratories, Camp Detrick, Maryland, in the 1940s

=== Endosymbiosis ===
Microbes can form an endosymbiotic relationship with larger organisms. For example, the bacteria that live within the human digestive system contribute to human health through gut immunity, the synthesis of vitamins such as folic acid and biotin, and the fermentation of complex indigestible carbohydrates. Future drugs and food chemicals may need to be tested on the gut microbiota; it is already clear that probiotic supplements can promote health, and that gut microbes are affected by both diet and medicines.

=== Warfare ===
Pathogenic microbes, and toxins that they produce, have been developed as possible agents of warfare. Crude forms of biological warfare have been practiced since antiquity. In the 6th century BC, the Assyrians poisoned enemy wells with a fungus said to render the enemy delirious. In 1346, the bodies of Mongol warriors of the Golden Horde who had died of plague were thrown over the walls of the besieged Crimean city of Kaffa, possibly assisting the spread of the Black Death into Europe. Advances in bacteriology in the 20th century increased the sophistication of possible bio-agents in war. Biological sabotage—in the form of anthrax and glanders—was undertaken on behalf of the Imperial German government during World War I, with indifferent results. In World War II, Britain weaponised tularemia, anthrax, brucellosis, and botulism toxins, but never used them. The USA similarly explored biological warfare agents, developing anthrax spores, brucellosis, and botulism toxins for possible military use. Japan developed biological warfare agents, with the use of experiments on human prisoners, and was about to use them when the war ended.

=== Horticulture ===
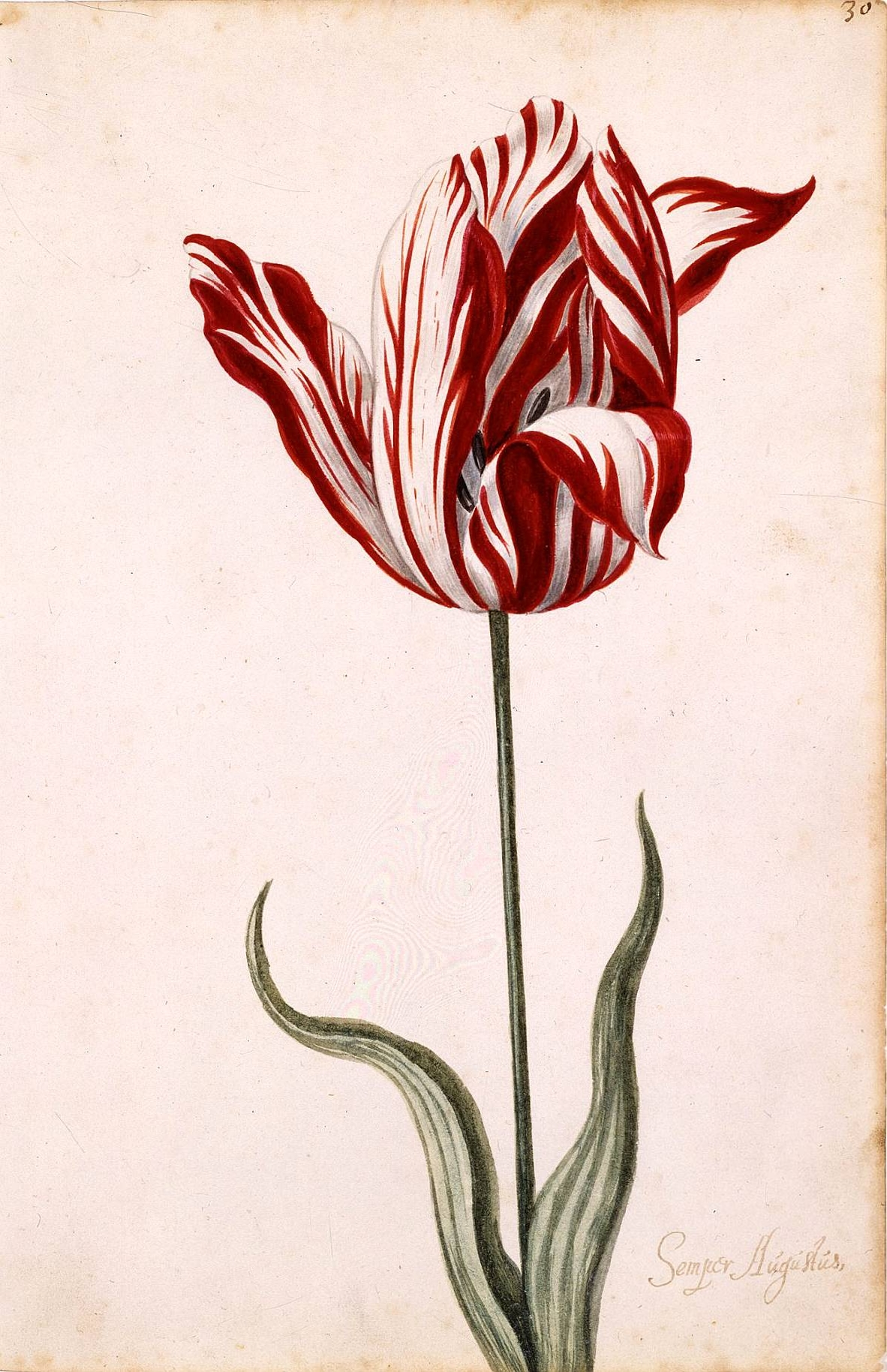
Semper Augustus Tulip, 17th century, owed its pattern to a virus.

The tulip breaking virus played a role in the tulip mania of the Dutch Golden Age. The famous Semper Augustus tulip, in particular, owed its striking pattern to infection with the plant disease, a kind of mosaic virus, making it the most expensive of all the tulip bulbs sold.

== Symbolic uses ==
Being very small, and unknown until the invention of the microscope, microbes do not feature directly in art or literature before Early Modern times (though they appear indirectly in works about brewing and baking), when Antonie van Leeuwenhoek observed microbes in water in 1676; his results were soon confirmed by Robert Hooke. A few major diseases such as tuberculosis appear in literature, art, film, opera and music.

=== In literature ===
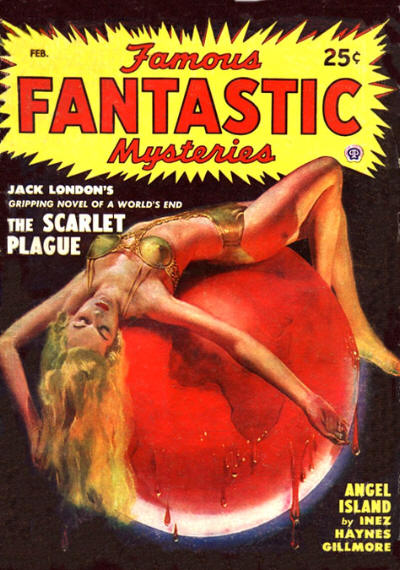
Jack London's 1912 The Scarlet Plague was reprinted in the February 1949 issue of Famous Fantastic Mysteries, the cover illustrated by Lawrence Sterne Stevens.

The literary possibilities of post-apocalyptic stories about pandemics (worldwide outbreaks of disease) have been explored in novels and films from Mary Shelley's 1826 The Last Man and Jack London's 1912 The Scarlet Plague onwards. Medieval writings that deal with plague include Giovanni Boccaccio's The Decameron and Geoffrey Chaucer's The Canterbury Tales: both treat the people's fear of contagion and the resulting moral decline, as well as bodily death.

The making of beer has been celebrated in verse since the time of Ancient Sumeria, c. 1800 BC, when the "Hymn to Ninkasi" was inscribed on a clay tablet. Ninkasi, tutelary goddess of beer, and daughter of the creator Enki and the "queen of the sacred lake" Ninki, "handles the dough and with a big shovel, mixing in a pit, the bappir with [date] honey, ... waters the malt set on the ground, ... soaks the malt in a jar, ... spreads the cooked mash on large reed mats, coolness overcomes, ... holds with both hands the great sweet wort, brewing it with honey".

Wine is a frequent topic in English literature, from the spiced French and Italian "ypocras", "claree", and "vernage" in Chaucer's The Merchant's Tale onwards. William Shakespeare's Falstaff drank Spanish "sherris sack", in contrast to Sir Toby Belch's preference for "canary". Wine references in later centuries branch out to more winegrowing regions.

The Microbe is a humorous 1912 poem by Hilaire Belloc, starting with the lines "The microbe is so very small / You cannot make him out at all,/ But many sanguine people hope / To see him through a microscope. Microbes and Man is an admired "classic" book, first published in 1969, by the "father figure of British microbiology" John Postgate on the whole subject of microorganisms and their relationships with humans.

=== In film ===
Microbes feature in many highly dramatized films. Hollywood was quick to exploit the possibilities of deadly disease, mass infection and drastic government reaction, starting as early as 1922 with Nosferatu, in which a Dracula-like figure, Count Orlok, sleeps in unhallowed ground contaminated with the Black Death, which he brings with him wherever he goes. Another classic film, Ingmar Bergman's 1957 The Seventh Seal, deals with the plague theme very differently, with the grim reaper directly represented by an actor in a hood. More recently, the 1971 The Andromeda Strain, based on a novel by Michael Crichton, portrayed an extraterrestrial microbe contaminating the Earth.

=== In music ===
"A Very Cellular Song," a song from the British psychedelic folk band The Incredible String Band's 1968 album The Hangman's Beautiful Daughter, is told partially from the point of view of an amoeba, a protistan. The COVID-19 pandemic inspired several songs and albums.

=== In art ===
Microbial art is the creation of artworks by culturing bacteria, typically on agar plates, to form desired patterns. These may be chosen to fluoresce under ultraviolet light in different colours. Alexander Fleming, the discoverer of penicillin, created "germ paintings" using different species of bacteria that were naturally pigmented in different colours.

An instance of a protist in an artwork is the artist Louise Bourgeois's bronze sculpture Amoeba. It has a white patina resembling plaster, and was designed in 1963–5, based on drawings of a pregnant woman's belly that she made as early as the 1940s. According to the Tate Gallery, the work "is a roughly modelled organic form, its bulges and single opening suggesting a moving, living creature in the stages of evolution."

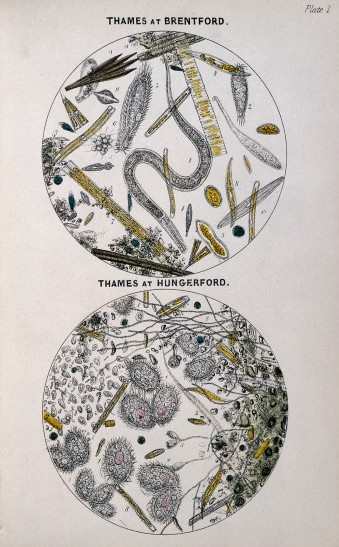
Microbes in the Thames at Brentford and Hungerford. Arthur Hill Hassall, 1850

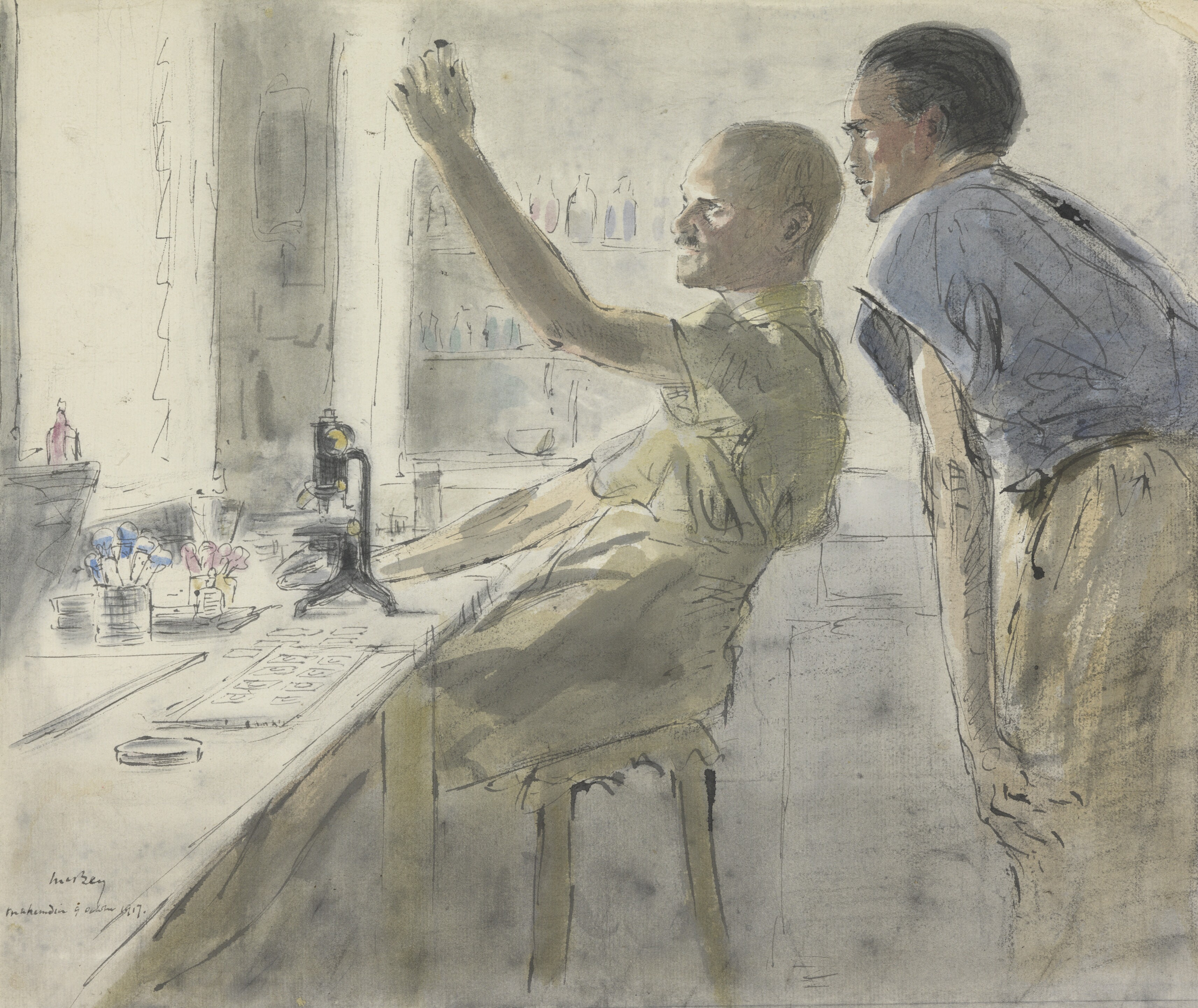
A British First World War microbiologist in his laboratory, examining a test tube of bacteria. Painted by James McBey, 1917

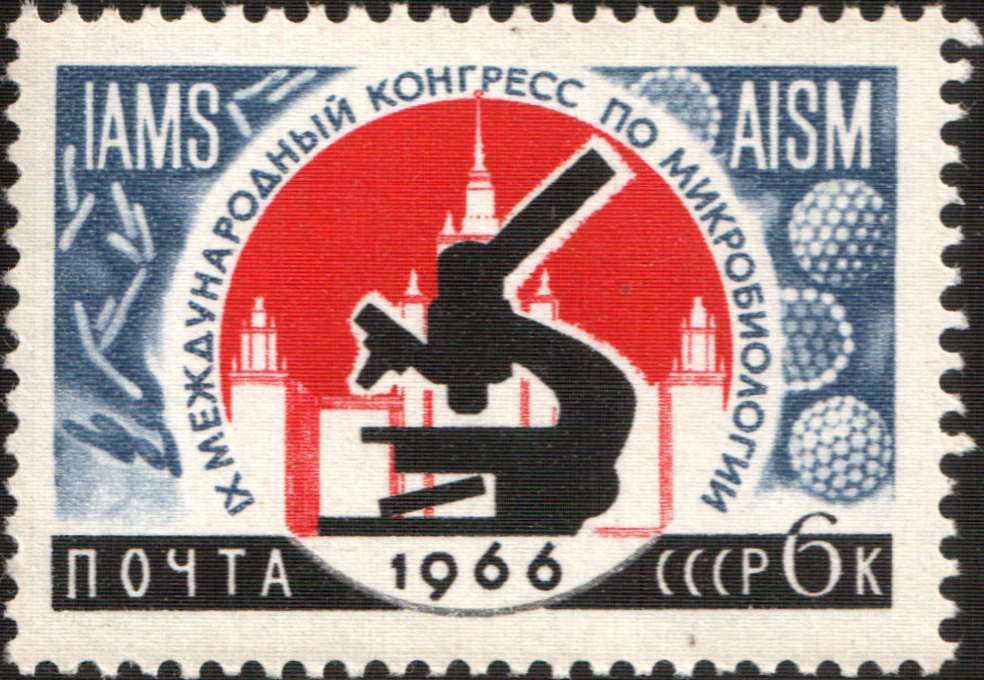
The Soviet Union 1966 stamp for the Microbiology International Congress. Bacteria and viruses form the background.

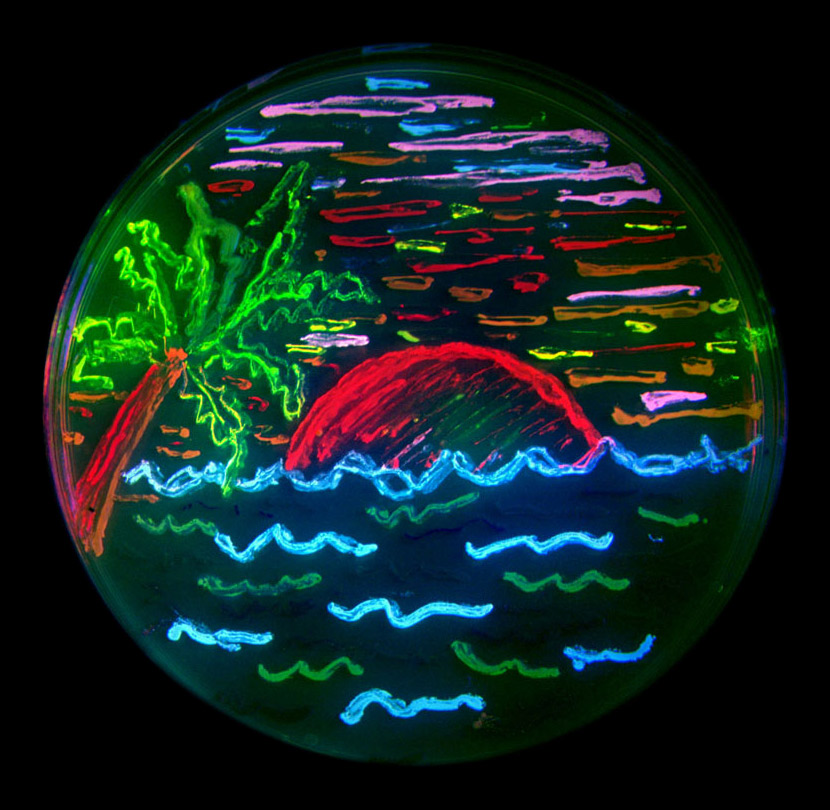
Beach scene with live bacteria in a Petri dish expressing different fluorescent proteins. Microbial art by Nathan Shaner, 2006

== Negative interactions ==
=== Disease ===
Microorganisms are the causative agents (pathogens) in many infectious diseases of humans and domestic animals. Pathogenic bacteria cause diseases such as plague, tuberculosis and anthrax. Protozoa cause diseases including malaria, sleeping sickness, dysentery and toxoplasmosis. Microscopic fungi cause diseases such as ringworm, candidiasis and histoplasmosis. Pathogenic viruses cause diseases such as influenza, yellow fever and AIDS.

The practice of hygiene was created to prevent infection or food spoiling by eliminating microbes, especially bacteria, from the surroundings.

=== In agriculture and horticulture ===
Microorganisms including bacteria, fungi, and viruses are important as plant pathogens, causing disease to crop plants. Fungi cause serious crop diseases such as maize leaf rust, wheat stem rust, and powdery mildew. Bacteria cause plant diseases including leaf spot and crown galls. Viruses cause plant diseases such as leaf mosaic. The oomycete Phytophthora infestans causes potato blight', contributing to the Great Irish Famine of the 1840s.
