= Not the Glory =

- Playhouse 90 episodes
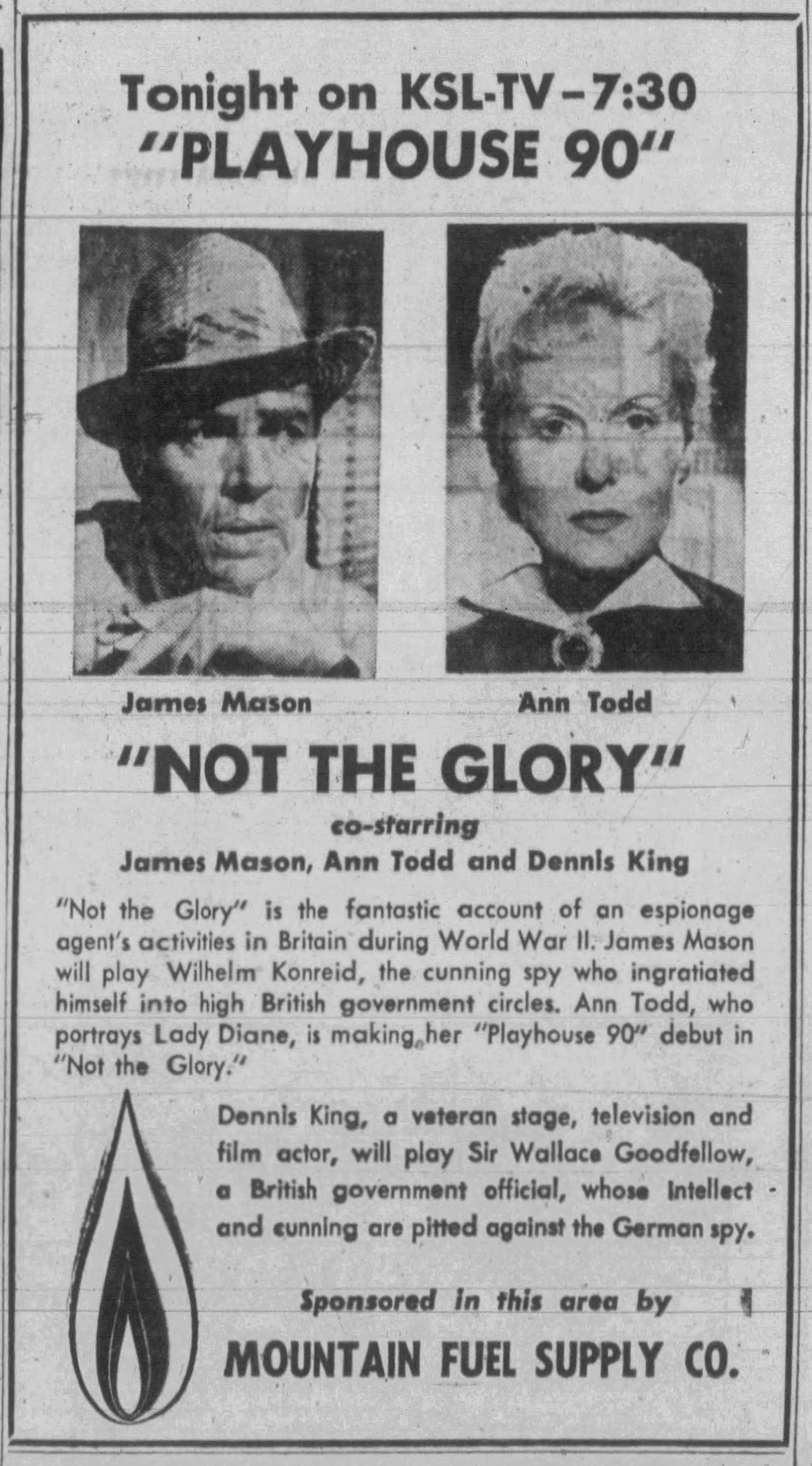
- Newspaper ad for "Not the Glory"
- Episode nos.: Season 2 Episodes 33
- Directed by: Robert Mulligan
- Written by: David Shaw (adaptation), Pierre Boulle (novel)
- Original air date: May 8, 1958

Guest appearances
- James Mason as Wilhelm Konreid; Ann Todd as Lady Diane Goodfellow; Dennis King as Sir Wallace Goodfellow

Episode chronology
← Previous "Rumors of Evening"	Next → "Nightmare at Ground Zero"

"Not the Glory" was an American television play broadcast on May 8, 1958, as part of the second season of the CBS television series Playhouse 90. David Shaw wrote the teleplay based on Pierre Boulle's first novel, William Conrad (1950). Robert Mulligan directed, and James Mason, Ann Todd, and Dennis King starred.

== Plot ==
A Nazi spy, Wilhelm Konreid, travels to London in 1939, posing as a Polish patriot. He "ingratiates himself into high British government circles" and is offered a job with the BBC. Sir Wallace Goodfellow is a British government official "whose intellect and cunning are pitted against" Konreid.

== Cast ==
The following cast received screen credit for their performances.

- James Mason as Wilhelm Konreid
- Ann Todd as Lady Diane Goodfellow
- Dennis King as Sir Wallace Goodfellow
- Walter Fitzgerald as Major Wickham
