= John Postgate (microbiologist) =

English microbiologist (1922–2014)

Professor John Postgate FRS
- Postgate in his laboratory
- Born: John Raymond Postgate; 24 June 1922; London, England
- Died: 22 October 2014 (aged 92)
- Education: University of Oxford (BA, DPhil)
- Known for: Microbes and Man (1969)
- Spouse: Mary Stewart (1948 – d. 2008)
- Children: 3
- Awards: FRS (1977); FIBiol; FSB; Leeuwenhoek Lecture (1992)
- Scientific career
- Fields: Microbiology; Nitrogen fixation; Sulphate reducing bacteria
- Workplaces: University of Sussex; Porton Down
- Thesis: Aspects of the metabolism of micro-organisms (1952)

John Raymond Postgate FRS (24 June 1922 – 22 October 2014) was an English microbiologist and writer, latterly Professor Emeritus of Microbiology at the University of Sussex. Postgate's research in microbiology investigated nitrogen fixation, microbial survival, and sulphate-reducing bacteria. He worked for the Agricultural Research Council's Unit of Nitrogen Fixation from 1963 until he retired, by then its director, in 1987. In 2011, he was described as a "father figure of British microbiology".

His admired popularizing book on microbes in human culture, Microbes and Man, first published in 1969, remains in print.

== Education and early life ==
John Raymond Postgate was born on 24 June 1922, as the elder son of the writer Raymond Postgate and Daisy Postgate, née Lansbury, private secretary to her father George Lansbury, the politician who was Labour Party Leader of the Opposition 1932-35. He had one brother, Oliver Postgate, later a well-known animator and producer for British television. Several other members of the Postgate family were notable in a variety of fields. His cousin is the actress Angela Lansbury.

He attended kindergarten and primary private schools in Golders Green, North London, before moving at age 11 to Kingsbury County School; he was evacuated to Devon at the start of World War II. In 1941 he was awarded an exhibition scholarship to Balliol College, Oxford, where he achieved a first class degree in Chemistry. He had also taken a special biochemistry course. His final examination involved research on the adaptation of bacteria to unfavourable environments and, supported by a grant from the Medical Research Council plus a Studentship from Balliol (which the MRC deducted from his grant), he spent a year reading Microbial Chemistry before doing research for a doctorate on aspects of how bacteria adapt to resist sulphonamide drugs. Sulfomamide drugs had been shown by D D Woods, his supervisor, to block the enzyme assimilating the metabolite p-aminobenzoic acid (PABA for short), a precursor of folic acid, by blocking the enzyme's active site. A substantial excess of a sulfonamide needed to put a complete stop to PABA assimilation. Postgate's research was to study sulfonamide action on a species of bacteria that required PABA from the environment as a vitamin; it gave him valuable experience of competition in enzymology.

== Career and research ==
In 1948, Postgate obtained a Research Fellowship at the Chemical Research Laboratory (CRL) in Teddington, West London, to investigate the biochemistry of the sulphate-reducing bacteria. A small microbiology group, led by K R Butlin, was researching their role in iron corrosion and other civil and industrial nuisances. The group also investigated and advised on diverse problems in economic microbiology which had been brought to the laboratory. The bacteria were known to be strict anaerobes which live by converting mineral sulphates to hydrogen sulphide. They are difficult to culture and to separate from other soil bacteria in the laboratory, but Butlin's group had isolated a few pure strains. Postgate managed to culture large populations of the organism and his experience of competition informed his first paper, in which he showed that selenates are powerful competitive inhibitors of sulphate reduction. He went on to obtain biochemical evidence on how they consume sulphates and carbon sources, but his most influential finding was cytochrome C3., a discovery that has been described as "seminal". Cytochromes are iron-containing proteins found in the cells of all air-breathing creatures from bacteria and plants to humans; they were known to be part of the aerobic respiratory apparatus and were widely understood to be absent from anaerobes. The appearance of a cytochrome, one which had an unusually large amount of iron, in a strict anaerobe conflicted with current theory. However soon it became accepted and the concept emerged of "anaerobic respiration", based on reducing nitrate, carbonate or similar oxygen-containing minerals. Postgate's research formed the basis of worldwide research on these bacteria and their cytochromes, as well as the discovery of many new genera; sulphate reducers are now known to constitute a diverse biosphere of their own.

Postgate also enjoyed the Group's more practical problems. His laboratory strain reduced sulphates at hitherto unheard-of rates, and their speed revived a wartime possibility of using them to manufacture sulphur for industry by fermenting waste with sulphate. This would mimic the way in which most of the world's native sulphur was deposited over geological time. A post-war World sulphur shortage was damaging post-war British industry, so he and Butlin were sent to Cyrenaica to sample a sulphur spring and check specimens for even better performance. The trip caught the attention of the press, and the microbiological production of sulphur became Butlin's pet project, with Postgate advising.

Postgate enjoyed the practical side and also made advances in understanding the biochemistry of the bacteria. The group expanded and widened its remit to encompass the microbiological production of sulphur and the treatment of chemical effluents; it also took over the National Collection of Industrial Bacteria. He was absorbed into its staff in 1950 as Senior Scientific Officer and promoted Principal Scientific Officer in 1952. In 1959, for controversial reasons, Butlin's group was disbanded and its staff and collection redeployed.

Postgate was released to take a post at the Microbiological Research Establishment (MRE), part of the Porton Down research complex at Porton near Salisbury in Wiltshire, to undertake fundamental research on how bacteria survive mild stresses such as near starvation, using both continuous and synchronous culture of bacteria. His extensive paper on the survival of starvation by Klebsiella bacteria reopened a research topic largely dormant since the 1920s and introduced the concept of cryptic growth (a sort of necrophagy) in the persistence of bacterial populations in ancient isolated environments such as salt inclusions or fossils. He was promoted Senior Principal Scientific Officer in 1961. In 1962 he was given leave to take up a Visiting Professorship of Microbiology at the University of Illinois, in the United States, to finish off some earlier research on sulphate-reducing bacteria and undertake some teaching duties. He returned to MRE in early 1963.

A change of emphasis in the research remit of MRE led to his resignation and in 1963 he was Appointed Assistant Director of the Agricultural Research Council's newly formed multidisciplinary Unit of Nitrogen Fixation (UNF), with the chemist Professor Joseph Chatt FRS as Director. Postgate's job was to plan and direct its biological research programme. The Unit settled at the University of Sussex in late 1964, and in 1965 the University appointed Postgate Professor of Microbiology in addition to his UNF position, with only postgraduate teaching duties.

The Unit's biological research was restricted to free-living nitrogen fixers, chosen as more amenable material for its research than those requiring a plant symbiosis. Its approach ranged from biochemical enzymology to microbial physiology and general microbiology, and in due course it introduced the genetics, and was genuinely collaborative, with everyone, including Postgate, working at the bench. Almost all its research publications were multi-authored and Postgate's name appeared only on those original papers to which he had actively contributed - though he prescribed and oversaw all his staff's research directions. Outstanding papers were: a series deducing mode of action of nitrogenase, the enzyme responsible for the initial attack of nitrogen, which is an oxygen-sensitive complex of two proteins, iron and molybdenum, which requires energy in the form of Adenosine triphosphate (ATP) to function and which releases hydrogen from water while fixing nitrogen; the elucidation of oxygen-screening processes in an oxygen-tolerant species of nitrogen fixer and the discovery in that microbe of a second nitrogenase containing vanadium in place of molybdenum alongside the regular one; the elucidation of a cluster of some 21 genes which code for the whole nitrogen-fixing system, the creation of mobile genetic elements carrying that cluster and the transfer therewith of the ability to fix nitrogen to wholly new bacteria by genetic manipulation. One of the Unit's plasmids came into worldwide use to study the genetics of nitrogen fixation. The Unit's reputation prospered as a world centre for basic research on the subject.

Postgate had spent March 1977-March 1978 as Visiting Professor of Microbiology at Oregon State University, U.S.A.. He became Director of the UNF when Chatt retired in 1980 and in turn Postgate retired in 1987. The UNF was later absorbed by the John Innes Centre at Norwich.

=== Publications ===
Postgate wrote over 200 research papers, some 30 'popular' articles in less specialised publications, over 50 book reviews and edited books on nitrogen fixation and microbial survival. He wrote four specialist books among which his monograph on sulphate-reducing bacteria stimulated worldwide research on this genus. His admired popular science books Microbes and Man, and The Outer Reaches Of Life, were influential and widely translated. Microbes and Man was first published by Penguin Books in 1969, and remains in print in its 4th edition (Cambridge University Press, 2000).

He wrote book reviews and other pieces for left-leaning periodicals in the early 1940s. Later he wrote many more general and sometimes controversial articles on subjects such as the population explosion, eugenics, religious bellicosity, and the public understanding of science, for publications including The Times, Times Literary Supplement, Financial Times and New Scientist. He was elected an Honorary Associate of the Rationalist Press Association in 1995.

His writings on family biography include three articles on his father Raymond Postgate and, with his wife Mary, his biography. He wrote articles on and a biography of his great-grandfather John Postgate. In 2013 he published a semi-autobiographical account of his own life as a scientist. He wrote about 10 obituaries and five entries for the Oxford Dictionary of National Biography.

=== Books ===
- A Plain Man's Guide To Jazz
- Nitrogen Fixation
- The Sulphate-reducing Bacteria
- Microbes and Man
- The Outer Reaches of Life
- A Stomach for Dissent; The Life of Raymond Postgate, 1896-1971
- Lethal Lozenges and Tainted Tea: A Biography of John Postgate, 1820-1881
- Microbes, Music and Me: A life in Science

== Awards and honours ==
Postgate was elected a Fellow of the Royal Society (FRS) in 1977 and a Fellow of the Institute of Biology in 1965, serving as President 1982-4. He was elected Member of the European Molecular Biology Organization (EMBO) in 1978. He gave the Royal Society Leeuwenhoek Lecture in 1992, entitled Bacterial evolution and the nitrogen-fixing plant. He served on several Royal Society or Government Committees and Working Parties on diverse matters: Space Biology; the Nitrogen Cycle; Terrestrial Microbiology; Scientists' Archives; and Genetic engineering. Having been on the Council of the Society for General Microbiology since 1966, he became President 1984-7 and Hon. Member 1988.

He served on the editorial board of the Journal of General Microbiology from 1960, becoming Editor in Chief 1970-74 and served on the Editorial Boards of the Royal Society's Notes and Records and Science and Public Affairs, also that of Geomicrobiology Journal.

He obtained a Doctor of Science (D.Sc) (Oxon) in 1965; he was awarded Honorary D.Sc. by the University of Bath in 1990, and Hon. Ll.D. by the University of Dundee, 1997. The Society for Applied Bacteriology made him an Hon. member in 1981. His nomination for the Royal Society reads:

Postgate has initiated some, and advanced many, areas of microbiology. He published the first serious biochemical studies of the sulphate-reducing bacteria and discovered cytochrome c-3 (the first cytochrome to be discovered in an anaerobe and the first low-potential cytochrome). He was the first to describe several new types of micro-organisms and has rationalized their manipulation and classification. His studies of the death of vegetative bacteria from starvation and cold have greatly enriched our understanding, as have his demonstrations of population effects, cryptic growth, substrate-accelerated death and 'moribund' steady states, in continuous cultures. Postgate also discovered protection by detergents from freezing damage. His recent studies of nitrogen fixation provided the first evidence for the direct involvement of metals; he has made major contributions by his purification of the nitrogenase of K. pneumoniae, by his demonstrations of oxygen exclusion mechanisms in Azotobacter, and by his recent success in transferring genes that specify nitrogen fixation from K. pneumoniae to E. coli.

== Personal life ==
In 1948, he left Oxford and married Mary Stewart, a graduate in English from St Hilda's College, Oxford; they had three daughters, Selina Anne, Lucy Belinda and Joanna Mary. His wife Mary died of Alzheimer's disease in 2008, having become known for her reviews of spoken word recordings.

Postgate was self-taught and never able to read music, but he led the Oxford University Dixieland Bandits on cornet from 1943-8, then played with Eric Conroy's Jazzmen, 1950–51, and then on irregular gigs. He enjoyed jazz music throughout his life and led Sussex Trugs (the University of Sussex staff jazz band which at one time included three Professors) 1965-87, then became a sideman until Trugs disbanded in 1999. He played fortnightly at Chiddingly, East Sussex for over twenty years, gaining a decent following, and also with local informal groups. After the 1970s he doubled occasionally on soprano saxophone. His youthful playing may be heard on one commercial CD, Oxford Jazz Through The Years, 1926-1963 (Raymer Sound, 2002).

Postgate wrote numerous articles, record reviews and book reviews on jazz for specialist jazz journals such as Jazz Monthly and Jazz Journal. He served on Gramophone's panel of jazz record reviewers for some 24 years. His early guide to jazz, A Plain Man's Guide To Jazz filled a need at its time but is now obsolete. With Bob Weir he wrote a bio-discography of the Jazz trumpeter Frankie Newton.

Postgate was a member of the Postgate family, and is not to be confused with his grandfather John Percival Postgate (1853–1926), professor of Latin at the University of Liverpool and author of school textbooks and editions of Latin poetry, nor with his great-grandfather John Postgate (1820–1881), a surgeon who became Professor of Medical Jurisprudence and Toxicology at Queen's College, Birmingham (a predecessor college of the University of Birmingham) and was a leading campaigner against food adulteration.
