= Rumors of Evening =

- Playhouse 90 episodes
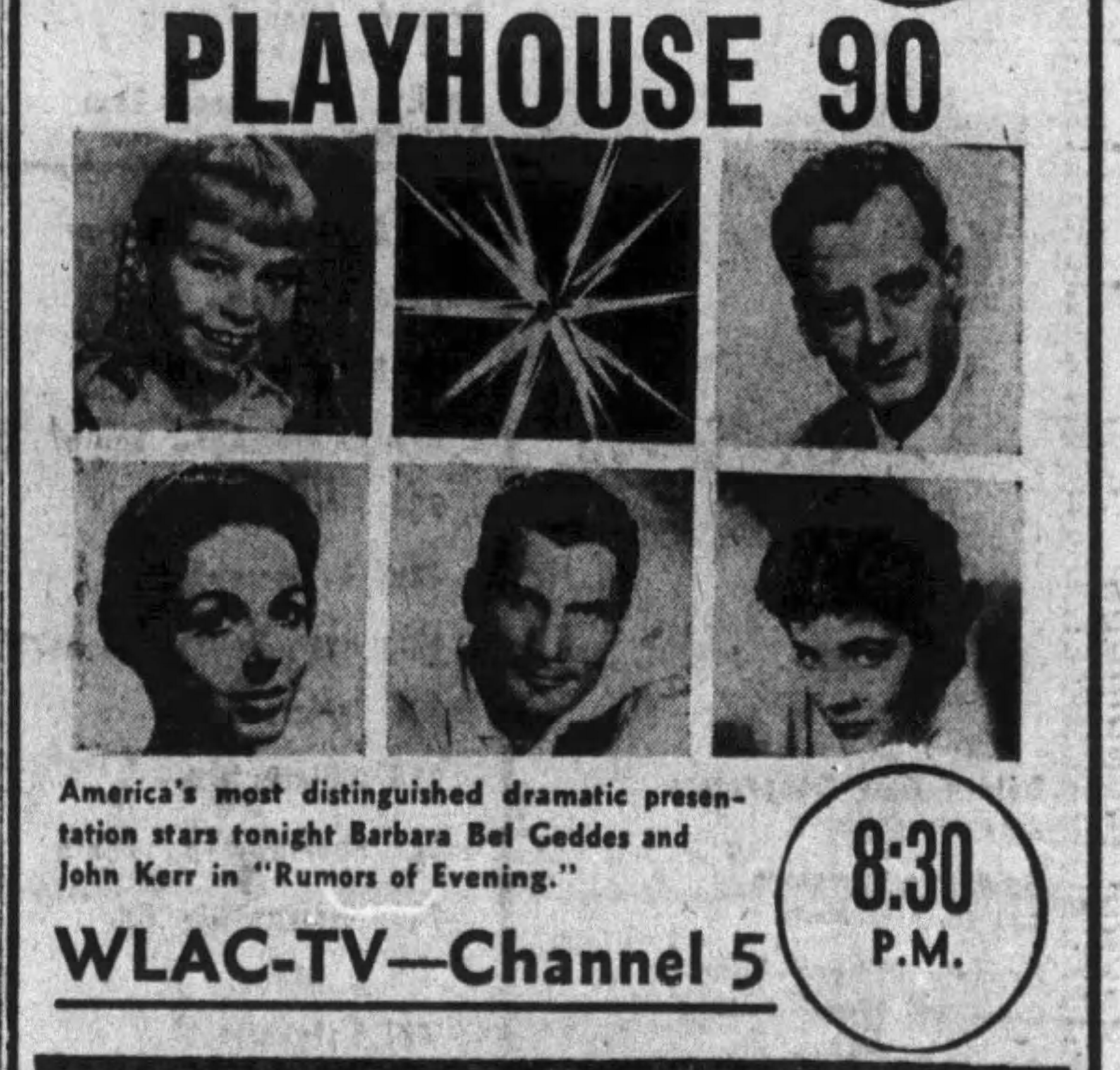
- Newspaper ad for "Rumors of Evening"
- Episode nos.: Season 2 Episodes 32
- Directed by: John Frankenheimer
- Written by: F.W. Durkee (writer), Leslie Stevens (adaptation)
- Original air date: May 1, 1958
- Running time: 1:22

Guest appearances
- Barbara Bel Geddes as Sidney Cantrell; John Kerr as Capt. Neil Dameron; Robert Loggia as Major Woulman

Episode chronology
← Previous "Verdict of Three"	Next → "Not the Glory"

"Rumors of Evening" is an American television play broadcast on May 1, 1958, as part of the second season of the CBS television series Playhouse 90. John Frankenheimer directed. Barbara Bel Geddes, John Kerr, and Robert Loggia starred, and The Kingston Trio also appeared as Bob, Dave, and Nick.

== Plot ==
A married American bomber pilot, Capt. Neil Dameron, is stationed at an air base within England during World War II. He falls in love with an English entertainer, Sidney Cantrell, and they find "a few moments of happiness in the midst of the grimness of war." In order to avoid being returned to the United States, and hoping to see the woman again, he volunteers for a dangerous mission.

== Cast ==
The following cast received screen credit for their performances.

- Barbara Bel Geddes as Sidney Cantrell
- John Kerr as Capt. Neil Dameron
- Robert Loggia as Major Woulman
- Robert F. Simon as General Strayer
- Pat Hitchcock as Irma Jean
- The Kingston Trio as Bob, Dave and Nick
- Ron Soble
- Mimi Gibson
- Leonard Davison

== Production ==
Martin Manulis was the producer, and John Frankenheimer directed. Leslie Stevens wrote the adaptation based on a story by F.W. Durkee Jr. It was originally scheduled to be broadcast live from Television City in Hollywood on April 10, 1958, but it was postponed due to a strike against CBS by its cameramen and technicians. It was ultimately broadcast on May 1, 1958, and later rerun on July 30, 1959. It was part of the second season of Playhouse 90, an anthology television series that was voted "the greatest television series of all time" in a 1970 poll of television editors.

The Kingston Trio performed in the background, including the songs "Scarlet Ribbons" and "When the Saints Go Marching In".

== Reception ==
William Ewald, a television critic for the United Press, praised the performances of Barbara Bel Geddes and Robert Loggia. He also found the love scenes to be "as alive as any I've ever seen on TV". However, he found the overall production to be formulaic: "Some superb acting and a slick production, but all of it stuck on a vehicle cut out of a familiar pattern that managed only to jog along when it should have soared."

Jack O'Brian of the International News Service praised the "stickout" performance of Robert Loggia and predicted that stardom as likely. He was indifferent about the overall production, calling it "a fair play with fine performances".
