= Nightmare at Ground Zero =

- Playhouse 90 episode
- Episode no.: Season 2 Episode 34
- Directed by: Franklin Schaffner
- Written by: Rod Serling & Paul Monash (teleplay), John C. Clark & Robert Cahn (book)
- Original air date: May 15, 1958

Guest appearances
- Barry Sullivan as Daniel Joyce; Jack Warden as Long; Carl Benton Reid as Gen. Tyler; Ainslie Pryor as Beloit

Episode chronology
← Previous "Not the Glory"	Next → "Bomber's Moon"

"Nightmare at Ground Zero" is a television play that was broadcast by CBS on May 15, 1958, as part of the television series, Playhouse 90. It was written by Rod Serling and Paul Monash based on the book by John C. Clark and Robert Cahn.

== Plot ==
Based on a true story, an advance party of five scientists is stationed in a bunker on Enewetak Atoll 20 miles from the detonation of the first hydrogen bomb test. They are trapped for 11 hours in a "hot" bunker due to miscalculations as to the size of the blast and the direction of the atomic fallout.

== Cast ==
The cast includes the following.

- Barry Sullivan as Daniel Joyce
- Jack Warden as Long
- Carl Benton Reid as Gen. Tyler
- Ainslie Pryor as Beloit
- Edmon Ryan

== Production ==
The program was produced as part of the second season of the television series, Playhouse 90. Franklin Schaffner was the director. The teleplay was written by Rod Serling and Paul Monash and adapted from the book, Nightmare at Ground Zero, by John C. Clark and Robert Cahn. It was aired on May 15, 1958.

== Reception ==
United Press television critic William Ewald gave the production a mixed review. He praised the direction and sets and found the production to be "a gripper" when it stuck to telling the story. However, he wrote that it "stumbled" when it turned to conflict between two of the scientists over the morality of the bomb. Ewald found the latter scenes, with scientists exchanging quotes from Browning and Horace, to be clumsy, dramatically unbelievable, and embarrassing.
