= Verdict of Three =

- Playhouse 90 episode
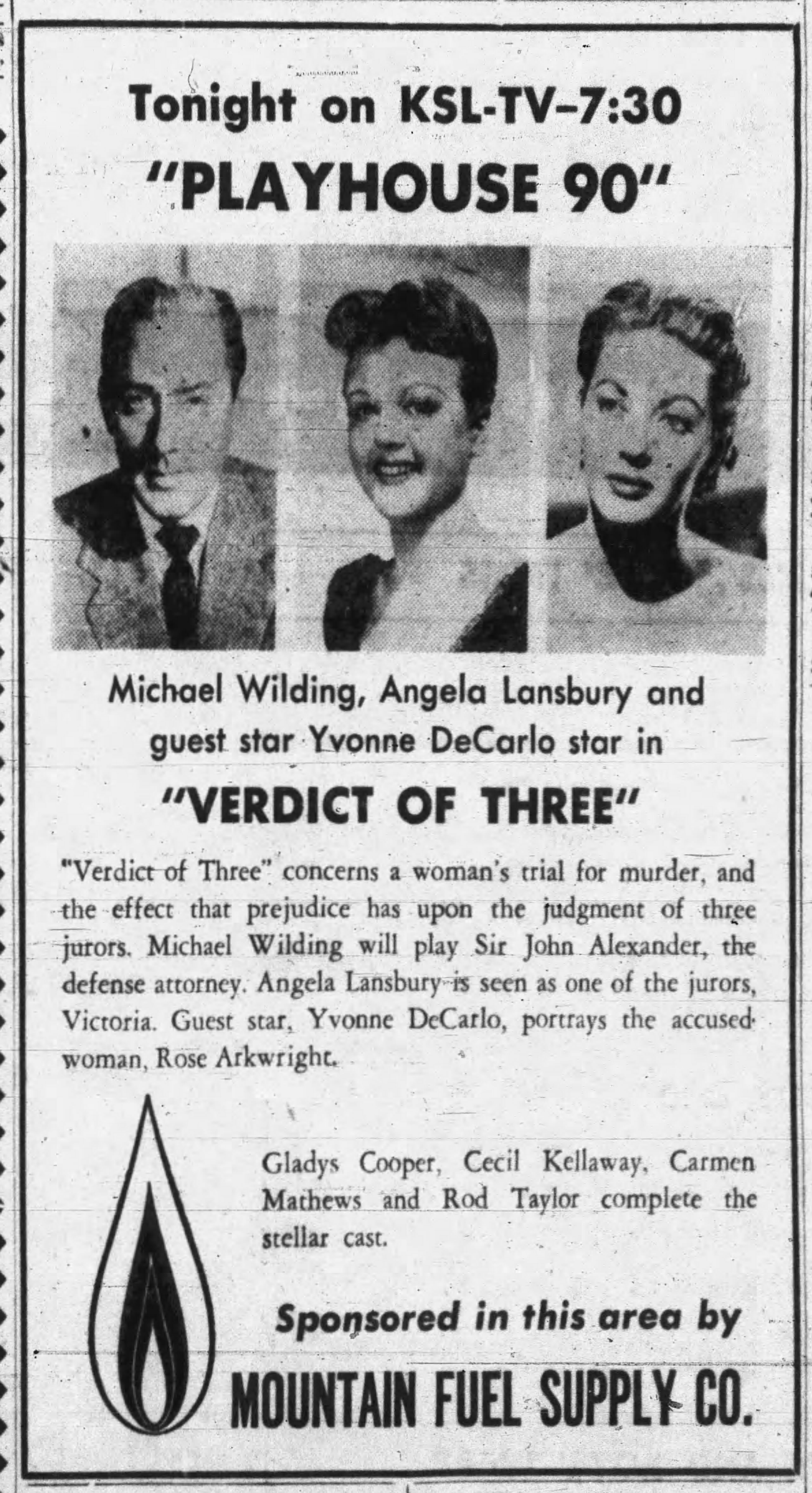
- Verdict of Three
- Episode no.: Season 2 Episode 31
- Directed by: Buzz Kulik
- Written by: James P. Cavanagh (adaptation), Raymond Postgate (novel)
- Original air date: April 24, 1958

Guest appearances
- Michael Wilding as Sir John Alexander; Angela Lansbury as Victoria Atkins; Yvonne De Carlo as Marina Arkwright

Episode chronology
← Previous "The Dungeon"	Next → "Rumors of Evening"

"Verdict of Three" is an American television play broadcast on April 24, 1958, as thirty-first episode of the second season of the CBS television series Playhouse 90. James P. Cavanagh wrote the teleplay loosely based on the 1940 novel, Verdict of Twelve by Raymond Postgate. Buzz Kulik directed and Martin Manulis produced. Michael Wilding, Angela Lansbury, and Yvonne De Carlo starred.

== Plot ==
Marina Arkwright is accused of poisoning her young son and is brought to trial. After her husband's death, Marina turned the boy over to his grandparents in return for a financial settlement. When the grandfather died and the boy was due to come into a sizable inheritance, Marina returned to her child. Three of the jurors selected for the trial bring their own prejudices to the case.

== Cast ==
The following cast received screen credit for their performances.

- Michael Wilding as Sir John Alexander, a defense attorney
- Yvonne De Carlo as Marina Arkwright, the accused
- Angela Lansbury as Victoria Atkins, a juror
- Gladys Cooper as Mrs. Allen
- Cecil Kellaway as Dr. Parkes
- Patrick Macnee as an attorney
- Carmen Mathews as Alice Morris
- Rod Taylor as Francis Allen
