= Postgate family =

English family

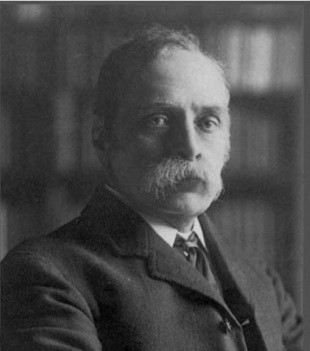
John Percival Postgate (1853–1926), classicist

The Postgate family is an English family that has been notable in a variety of different fields. It originated in the North York Moors and records go back to land held by Postgates in 1200. Fields and a farm bearing the name still exist. The name is rare outside Yorkshire.

John Postgate (food safety campaigner) (1820–1881)- son of Scarborough builder Thomas Postgate and his wife Jane, née Wade- was an English surgeon who became Professor of Medical jurisprudence and Toxicology at Queen's College, Birmingham (which later became Birmingham University) and was a leading campaigner against food adulteration.

His son John Percival Postgate (1853–1926) was professor of comparative philology (comparative-historical linguistics) at University College, London, then of Latin at the University of Liverpool from 1909 to 1920. He edited the Classical Review and the Classical Quarterly, and published both school textbooks and editions of Latin poetry. He married Edith Allen, and they had six children.

John Percival Postgate's daughter Dame Margaret Cole (1893–1980) was married in 1918 to the socialist economist and writer G. D. H. Cole. They wrote over 30 detective novels together between 1925 and 1948. She went into London politics and received a DBE. Her brother Raymond Postgate (1896 –1971) was notable as a socialist, journalist and editor, social historian, mystery novelist and gourmet. He founded The Good Food Guide in 1951, which was ahead of its time in being largely based on volunteer reports on restaurants. He married Daisy Lansbury (1892–1971), daughter of, and secretary to, the politician George Lansbury (1859–1940) who led the Labour Party from 1932 to 1935, and whose biography was among Raymond's books.

In the next generation, Raymond's children include the microbiologist John Postgate FRS (1922–2014), Professor of Microbiology at the University of Sussex, who was also a writer on, and sometime performer of, jazz. His brother, Richard Oliver Postgate (1925–2008), was an animator, puppeteer and writer, who created television series including Noggin the Nog, Ivor the Engine, and Clangers from the 1950s to the 1980s. Oliver Postgate had three sons: Stephen Postgate, Simon Postgate and Daniel Postgate (1964–2025). Daniel, his youngest son, was a children's book writer and illustrator; he inherited Oliver's company Smallfilms and created a new series of Clangers on CBeebies. Their cousin, actress Dame Angela Lansbury (1925–2022), had a film and stage career spanning over 70 years.

Another son of John Percival Postgate was Ormond Oliver Postgate (1905–1989), a much-loved teacher of Latin and history at Peter Symonds School in Winchester, who retired in 1970. His son Nicholas Postgate, FBA (born 5 November 1945) is a British academic and Assyriologist. He is Professor of Assyriology at the University of Cambridge and a fellow of Trinity College, Cambridge.

The family is probably related collaterally to the Catholic recusant priest and martyr Blessed Nicholas Postgate (1596/97 – 7 August 1679) who was hanged, disembowelled and quartered at York in the aftermath of the Popish Plot, as well as to Michael Postgate who founded the Postgate School at Great Ayton where Captain James Cook was educated.

The Australian writer and academic Coral Lansbury, the mother of Malcolm Turnbull, the 29th Prime Minister of Australia, was a distant cousin through the Lansburys.

== Biographies and autobiographies ==
The speaking voice of Oliver Postgate, from the BBC Radio 4 programme Desert Island Discs, 15 July 2007

- John Postgate (2001) Lethal Lozenges and Tainted Tea: A Biography of John Postgate (1820–1881). ISBN 978-1-85858-178-1
- Cole, Margaret (1949) Growing up into Revolution
- Cole, Margaret (1971) The Life of G. D. H. Cole
- Mitchison, N., (1982) Margaret Cole, 1893–1980 ISBN 0-7163-0482-1
- Vernon, B. D. (1986) Margaret Cole, 1893–1980: A Political Biography ISBN 0-7099-2611-1
- John & Mary Postgate, A Stomach For Dissent: The Life Of Raymond Postgate, (Keele University Press, 1994).
- Seeing Things: An Autobiography, Oliver Postgate; illustrated by Peter Firmin, 2000 – ISBN 0-330-39000-7; republished in 2009 – ISBN 978-1-84767-840-9
- John Postgate (2013), Microbes, Music and Me, ISBN 9781861511003
