= Daniel Postgate =

English script writer, author and illustrator (1964–2025)

- Born: Daniel Raymond Postgate; 5 February 1964; Whitstable, Kent, England
- Died: 27 June 2025 (aged 61); Whitstable, Kent, England
- Occupations: scriptwriter, illustrator, author
- Partner: Rochelle Bloom
- Children: 2
- Parent(s): Oliver Postgate; Prudence Myers
- Relatives: Raymond Postgate (grandfather); George Lansbury (great grandfather); Angela Lansbury (cousin)
- Family: Postgate family

Daniel Raymond Postgate (5 February 1964 – 27 June 2025) was an English scriptwriter, author and illustrator. Some of his books include Smelly Bill, Engelbert Sneem and His Dream Vacuum Machine, and Big Mum Plum. In 2014, he collaborated with his father Oliver Postgate’s business partner and other founder of Smallfilms, Peter Firmin, on the production of a new series of The Clangers, with Daniel Postgate writing many of the episodes and voicing the Iron Chicken, The Soup Dragon, and her son, Baby Soup Dragon. He won a Bafta for his episode 'I am the Eggbot'.

After the death of his father in 2008, Postgate inherited Smallfilms, the company set up by Postgate and Firmin. Smallfilms is a company that has made Pingwings, Pogles' Wood, Noggin the Nog, Ivor the Engine, Clangers and Bagpuss, and was shown on the BBC between 1950s and 1980s, and on ITV from 1959 to the present day.

== Early life ==
Postgate was born in Whitstable Hospital on 5 February 1964, the youngest son of Oliver Postgate and Prudence Myers, nee Briton. Postgate grew up in Blean, a village just outside Whitstable, and lived in a large house which was once a pub. He attended the Canterbury Technical College.

== Career ==
After moving to London, Postgate regularly contributed his cartoons to The Sunday Times newspaper. In 1993, he wrote and illustrated his first picture book, Kevin Saves the World. Postgate subsequently wrote and illustrated many children's books (including Big Mum Plum, Hairy Toe, Smelly Bill, Wild West Willy) and was a main writer for the 2015 CBeebies revival of Clangers, which won a Bafta in 2015 for Postgate's script and he was nominated again the following year for best writer. Postgate said his influences as an illustrator included "Quentin Blake, Tony Ross, Maurice Sendak, Don Martin, Sempe and Dr. Seuss".

== Personal life and death ==
Postgate worked as a chef, a painter of horses and sea scenes on old wooden boxes, a freelance cartoonist and a picture book illustrator. He had two children, a son and a daughter.

He took his own life in Whitstable on 27 June 2025 at the age of 61, the day after receiving a letter from the NHS about a cancer diagnosis. He had previously been treated for aplastic anaemia, and in 2024 was diagnosed with myelodysplastic syndrome.
