= Microbes and Man =

1969 book by John Postgate

- Cover of the third edition published in 1992
- Author: John Postgate
- Publication date: 1969

Microbes and Man is a popularising book by the English microbiologist John Postgate FRS on the role of microorganisms in human society, first published in 1969, and still in print in 2017. Critics called it a "classic" and "a pleasure to read".

== Book ==
=== Contents ===
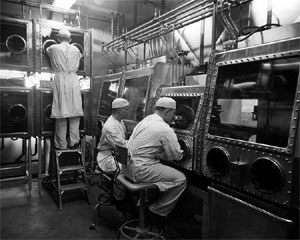
Microbes and men: scientists working with Class III cabinets at the U.S. Biological Warfare Laboratories, Camp Detrick, Maryland, in the 1940s

The book is structured as follows:

- 1 Man and microbes
- 2 Microbiology
- 3 Microbes in society
- 4 Interlude: how to handle microbes
- 5 Microbes in nutrition
- 6 Microbes in production
- 7 Deterioration, decay and pollution
- 8 Disposal and cleaning-up
- 9 Second interlude: microbiologists and man
- 10 Microbes in evolution
- 11 Microbes in the future

=== Illustrations ===
The 4th edition has 32 illustrations, ranging from photographs of microscopic algae, protozoa, fungi, viruses and bacteria, to the macroscopic effects of microbes such as a sulphur-forming lake in Libya and fish killed by bacterial reduction of sulphate in water.

=== Editions ===
- 1st edition, Cambridge University Press, 1969
- 2nd edition, Cambridge University Press, 1986
- 3rd edition, Cambridge University Press, 1992
- 4th edition, Cambridge University Press, 2000

The book has been translated into nine languages: Arabic, Chinese, Czech, French, German, Japanese, Polish, Portuguese, and Spanish.

== Reception ==
The Guardian described the book as "a passionate case for the importance of micro-organisms".

In his textbook Essential Microbiology, Stuart Hogg recommends the book to readers who want a general overview of microbes and their uses, stating "there can be no better starting point than John Postgate's classic".

New Scientist described the book as "a pleasure to read from first page to last. It is a literal statement. Start to read it and the first page, describing the astonishing dispersion of microbes, from the upper atmosphere to the depths of the sea, will provide any reader with enough wonder and excitement to take them through to the last page and the surface of Venus." The magazine commented that Postgate's "admirable, elegantly written and painlessly informative book" came close to losing its alliterative title, at the hands of "militant feminists" at Penguin Books editing the paperback version in 1986. (Note: The review noted that they replaced all suspect terms with gender-neutral forms, ignoring the context, so "every schoolboy" became "every schoolchild", wrong because Postgate was actually writing about unequal provision of science education. Worse, and "hilariously" in the reviewer's opinion, "backroom boy" became "students in backrooms", showing "ignorance of idiom and insensitivity to the nuances of language".)

Dennis R. Schneider, reviewing the 3rd edition in 1992 for Cell, described the book as having "succinctly and carefully explained examples of how microorganisms affect our lives ... one of the classics of popular science", standing alongside classics like Rosebury's Life of Man and De Kruif's Microbe Hunters. Schneider wrote that the book's Britishness "'colours' the text", but Postgate's emphasis on the beneficial and not just the harmful effects of microbes was welcome and admirably explored. He noted few errors, but objected to Postgate's assertion that AIDS "originated by transmission from a primate", for which there was at that time no evidence. Schneider would have liked a "better and longer" account of molecular biology. His chief criticism, however, was that by the 1990s the book no longer had an audience, since "the Victorial ideal of the educated middle class has vanished into the wasteland of broken families, double digit unemployment and a damaged educational system". All the same, he found the book "of value and beauty (except perhaps to the publisher)".

Charles W. Kim, reviewing the 3rd edition for The Quarterly Review of Biology, stated that "If the author's intent was to present the impact of the ubiquitous microorganisms on the environment and humans, he has succeeded admirably", describing Postgate's style as "unique".

D. Roy Cullimore, in his Practical Atlas for Bacterial Identification, comments that all four editions were "easy reading", addressing the challenges that microbes presented to human society. He suggests that "ideally" all four books be read in sequence for an overview of the development of microbiology in half a century.
