= John Percival Postgate =

British classical scholar

Professor John Percival Postgate FBA
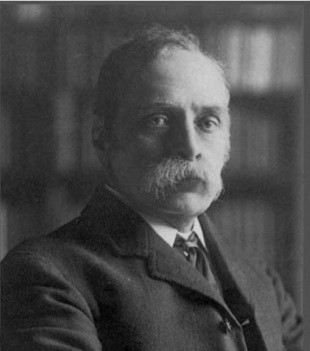
- Born: John Percival Postgate; 24 October 1853; Birmingham, England
- Died: 15 July 1926 (aged 72); Cambridge, England
- Education: University of Liverpool
- Occupations: Professor, scholar
- Spouse: Edith Allen
- Children: Raymond Postgate; Margaret Cole
- Parent: John Postgate
- Relatives: Oliver Postgate (grandson); John Postgate (grandson)
- Family: Postgate family

An American edition of "The New Latin Primer"

John Percival Postgate, FBA (24 October 1853 – 15 July 1926) was an English classicist and academic. He was a fellow of Trinity College, Cambridge from 1878 until his death, and also taught at Girton College, Cambridge (1877–1909), and University College, London (1880–1908). Having been passed over for the Chair of Latin at the University of Cambridge, he was Professor of Latin at the University of Liverpool from 1909 to 1920. He was a member of the Postgate family.

== Biography ==
Postgate was born on 24 October 1853 in Birmingham, England, to John Postgate. He was educated at King Edward's School, Birmingham, an independent all-boys school, where he became head boy. He matriculated into Trinity College, Cambridge, in 1872 as a sizar, where he read for the Classical Tripos. He was awarded a scholarship in 1874. He graduated from the University of Cambridge with a first-class Bachelor of Arts (BA) degree in 1876. As per tradition, his BA was promoted to a Master of Arts (MA Cantab) degree.

Postgate was a college lecturer in classics at Girton College, Cambridge, from 1877 to 1909; the student's of the all-women college were often left in tears following his classes. He was elected a fellow of Trinity College, Cambridge in 1878; he held the post until his death. He was additionally Professor of Comparative Philology at University College, London, from 1880 to 1908. At Trinity College, he was a college lecturer in classics 1884 to 1903 and then a senior lecturer from 1903 to 1909. He was deputy reader in comparative philology at the University of Cambridge from 1889 to 1890. He was a possible candidate to succeed John E. B. Mayor as Professor of Latin, but he likely (and rightly) assumed the chair would got to A. E. Housman instead. In 1909, he left Cambridge and was appointed Professor of Latin at the University of Liverpool. His salary for the Liverpool chair was £500 a year plus a share in student fees (anywhere between £600 and £1000), thereby totalling more than £1000; in contrast a chair at Cambridge only paid £300.

He was elected as a member to the American Philosophical Society in 1886. In 1907, he was elected a Fellow of the British Academy (FBA), the United Kingdom's national academy for the humanities and social sciences.

He established himself as a creative editor of Latin poetry with published editions of Propertius, Lucan, Tibullus and Phaedrus. His major work was the two-volume Corpus Poetarum Latinorum, a triumph of editorial organisation. An influential work was his often reprinted "The New Latin Primer", 1888, much used in British schools over subsequent decades. While at Cambridge, he edited the Classical Review and the Classical Quarterly. He was the first honorary secretary (1903–1906) of the Classical Association, an educational organisation founded to promote the study of classical subjects in schools and universities, and was its president from 1924 to 1925.

He retired in 1920, and was made professor emeritus by the University of Liverpool. He then moved back to Cambridge.

== Personal life ==
In June 1891, Postgate married Edith Allen, a former student of his. She was the sister of T. W. Allen, a classical scholar. Together, they had six children among whom were Raymond Postgate (a journalist, historian, novelist and food writer), and Margaret Cole (a Fabian politician). Through Raymond, he was grandfather to the animator and puppeteer Oliver Postgate and the microbiologist John Postgate.

Postgate's relationship with his son Raymond and daughter Margaret were strained when they championed pacificism during the First World War. While he attempted to use his influence behind the scenes to support his son when he was prosecuted for his beliefs, he otherwise disowned him and refused to acknowledge his marriage to Daisy Lansbury. He also wrote Raymond and Margaret out of his will except for a £100 a year pension for each from the age of 55.

On 14 July 1926, he was injured in a cycling accident, when he was knocked off his bicycle by a lorry in Cambridge. He was taken to Addenbrooke's Hospital but died of his injuries the following day. He was worth £33,029 at the time of his death, the majority of which (£27,000) was donated to the University of Liverpool; it had first been offered to Trinity College, Cambridge, but they refused the legacy.

== Published works ==
- The New Latin Primer (London, 1888)
- Sermo Latinus. A Short Guide to Latin Prose Composition (London, 1889; revised and enlarged ed. 1913)
- (ed.) Corpus Poetarum Latinorum, 2 vols. (London, 1905–1920)
- (ed.) Tibulli Aliorumque Carminum Libri Tres. Oxford Classical Texts (Oxford, 1905)
- "Flaws in Classical Research". Proceedings of the British Academy, 1907–1908. 3: 161–212. (1908)
- (ed. and tr., with F.W. Cornish and J.W. Mackail) Catullus, Tibullus and Pervigilium Veneris. Loeb Classical Library (London, 1912)
- (ed. with notes) M. Annaei Lucani De Bello Civili Liber VII (Cambridge, 1917; rev. ed. by O.A.W. Dilke, Bristol, 1978)
- (ed. with notes) M. Annaei Lucani De Bello Civili Liber VIII (Cambridge, 1917)
- Translation and Translations. Theory and Practice (London, 1922)
- Prosodia Latina. An Introduction to Classical Latin Verse (Oxford, 1923)
- A Short Guide to the Accentuation of Ancient Greek (Liverpool, 1924)
- (ed.) Phaedri Fabulae Aesopiae. Oxford Classical Texts (Oxford, 1934)
