= Daisy Postgate =

British political activist

Daisy Postgate (née Lansbury, 9 December 1892 – 20 April 1971) was a British political activist.

== Early life ==
Born in Bow, London, she was the sixth child of George and Bessie Lansbury. When she was born, the family were living in poverty, but their situation steadily improved, and she attended school until the age of fourteen. She then spent three years assisting her mother with housework and caring for her younger siblings, then studied shorthand and typing, becoming a bookkeeper and typist for her brother Edgar.

== Politics and suffrage campaigns ==
In 1912, Daisy became her father's personal secretary, a position she held until his death in 1940. In this role, she supported the Independent Labour Party. She shared a flat with May O'Callaghan and Nellie and Rose Cohen, and they were active in the East London Federation of Suffragettes and its successors. In 1913, she helped Sylvia Pankhurst to evade police capture by disguising herself as Pankhurst.

Through the National Guilds League, she met Raymond Postgate, and the two married in 1918. The couple had two children: John, who became a microbiologist, and Oliver, who became an animator.

Daisy increasingly worked as a secretary for her husband, it being her main job after her father's death, and she played a leading role in the first years of the Good Food Guide. From the 1960s, her health was increasingly poor, and she died in 1971, a few weeks after Raymond.
