= Oliver Postgate =

British animator, puppeteer and writer

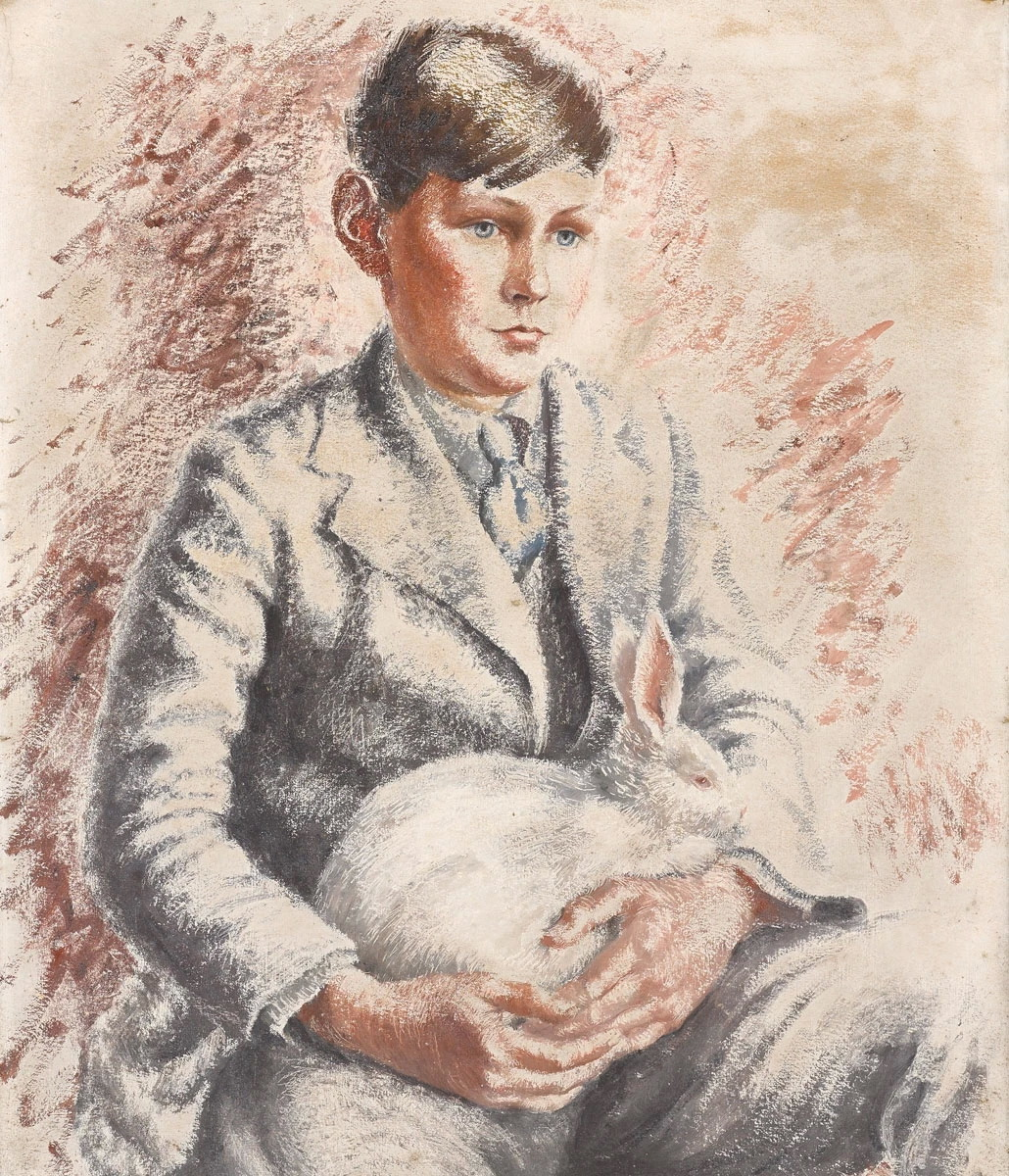
- Oliver Postgate in 1934, by Stella Bowen
- Born: Richard Oliver Postgate; 12 April 1925; Hendon, Middlesex, England
- Died: 8 December 2008 (aged 83); Broadstairs, Kent, England
- Occupations: Animator, puppeteer, writer
- Spouse: Prudence Myers (m. 1957; died 1982)
- Partner: Naomi Linnell (1985–2008)
- Children: 3, including Daniel
- Parents: Raymond Postgate (father); Daisy Lansbury (mother)
- Family: Postgate family John Postgate (brother); Angela Lansbury (cousin); Margaret Cole (aunt)

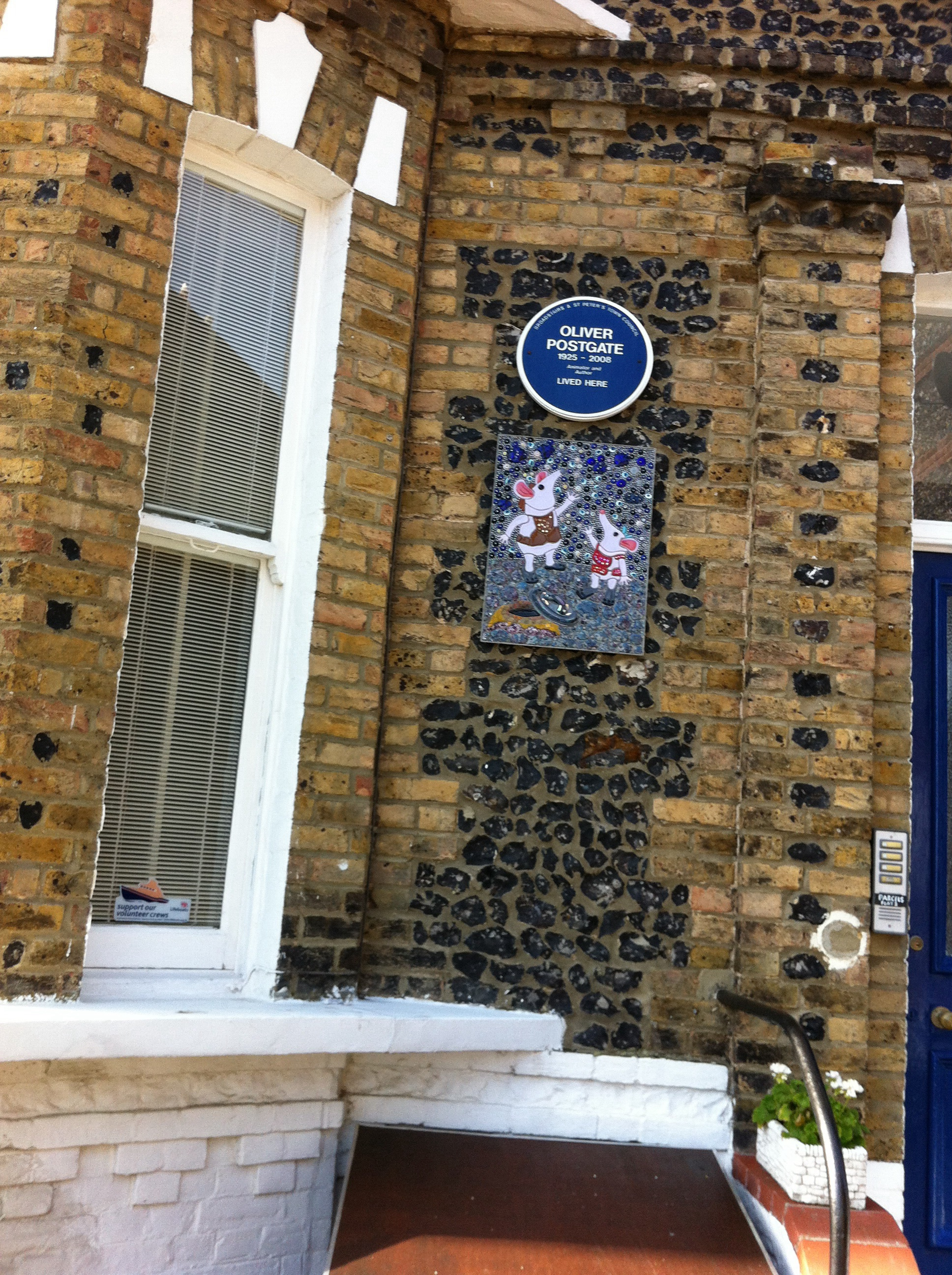
Blue plaque on Oliver's former home in Broadstairs, with Clangers mosaic below

Richard Oliver Postgate (12 April 1925 – 8 December 2008) was an English animator, puppeteer, and writer. He was the creator and writer of several popular British children's television programmes. Bagpuss, Pingwings, Noggin the Nog, Ivor the Engine, Clangers and Pogles' Wood, were all made by Smallfilms, the company he set up with collaborator, artist and puppet maker Peter Firmin. The programmes were originally broadcast by the BBC from the 1950s to the 1980s. In a 1999 BBC poll Bagpuss was voted the most popular children's television programme of all time.

== Early life ==
Postgate was born in Hendon, Middlesex, England, into the Postgate family, as the younger son of journalist and writer Raymond Postgate and his wife Daisy (née Lansbury), making him the cousin of actress Angela Lansbury and maternal grandson of Labour politician, and sometime leader, George Lansbury. His other grandfather was the Latin classicist John Percival Postgate. His brother was the microbiologist and writer John Postgate. Another aunt was Margaret Cole, the socialist politician.

== Education ==
Postgate was educated at the private Woodstock School on Golders Green Road in Finchley in northwest London and Woodhouse Secondary School, formerly known from 1923 onwards as Woodhouse Grammar School, also in Finchley (and now renamed Woodhouse College), followed by Dartington Hall School, a progressive private boarding school in Devon.

== Early career ==
The speaking voice of Oliver Postgate, from the BBC Radio 4 programme Desert Island Discs, 15 July 2007

Postgate joined the Home Guard in 1942 while studying at the Kingston School of Art, but when he became liable for military service during the Second World War the following year, he declared himself a conscientious objector, as his father had done during the First World War. He was initially refused recognition; he accepted a medical examination as a first step to call up, and then reported for duty with the Army in Windsor, but refused to put on the uniform. He was court-martialled and sentenced to three months in Feltham Prison. This qualified him to return to the Appellate Tribunal, where he was granted exemption conditional upon working on the land or in social service, the unserved portion of his sentence being remitted. He worked on farms until the end of the war, when he went to occupied Germany, working for the Red Cross in social relief work.

On return to the UK, from 1948 he attended the London Academy of Music and Dramatic Art, but drifted through a number of different jobs, never really finding his niche.

In 1957 he was appointed a stage manager with Associated-Rediffusion, which then held the ITV franchise for London. Attached to the children's programming section, he thought he could do better with the relatively low budgets of the then black and white television productions. Postgate wrote Alexander the Mouse, a story about a mouse born to be king. Using an Irish-produced magnetic system – on which animated characters were attached to a painted background, and then photographed through a 45-degree mirror – he persuaded Peter Firmin, who was then teaching at the Central School of Art, to create the background scenes. Postgate later recalled they undertook around 26 of these programmes live-to-air, which were made harder by the production problems encountered by the use and restrictions of using magnets.

After the success of Alexander the Mouse, Postgate agreed a deal to make the next series on film, for a budget of £175 per programme. Making a stop motion animation table in his bedroom, he wrote the Chinese story The Journey of Master Ho. This was intended for deaf children, a distinct advantage in that the production required no soundtrack which reduced the production costs. He engaged an honorary Chinese painter to produce the backgrounds, but as the painter was classical Chinese-trained he produced them in three-quarters view, rather than in the conventional Egyptian full-view manner used for flat animation under a camera. This resulted in the Firmin-produced characters looking as though they were short in one leg, but the success of the production provided the foundation for Postgate with Firmin to start up his own company solely producing animated children's programmes.

== Smallfilms ==
Setting up their business in a disused cowshed at Firmin's home in Blean near Canterbury, Kent, Postgate and Firmin worked on children's animation programmes. Based on concepts which mostly originated with Postgate, Firmin did the artwork and built the models, while Postgate wrote the scripts, did the stop motion filming and many of the voices. Smallfilms was therefore able to produce two minutes of film per day, ten times as much as a conventional animation studio, with Postgate moving the cardboard pieces himself, and working his 16 mm camera frame-by-frame with a home-made clicker. As Postgate voiced many of the productions, and also narrated WereBear stories, his distinctive voice became familiar to generations of children.

They started in 1959 with Ivor the Engine, a series for ITV about a Welsh steam locomotive who wanted to sing in a choir, based on Postgate's wartime encounter with Welshman Denzyl Ellis, who used to be the fireman on the Royal Scot. (It was remade in colour for the BBC in 1976 and 1977.) This was followed by Noggin the Nog for the BBC, which established Smallfilms as a reliable source to produce children's entertainment, when there were only two television channels in the UK. Postgate later described the "gentlemanly and rather innocent" business thus:

We would go to the BBC once a year, show them the films we'd made, and they would say: "Yes, lovely, now what are you going to do next?" We would tell them, and they would say: "That sounds fine, we'll mark it in for eighteen months from now", and we would be given praise and encouragement and some money in advance, and we'd just go away and do it.

Postgate had strict views on story-line development, which perhaps resultantly restricted the length of each particular series development. When asked if the Clangers adventures were quite surreal sometimes, Postgate replied:

They're surreal but logical. I have a strong prejudice against fantasy for its own sake. Once one gets to a point beyond where cause and effect mean anything at all, then science fiction becomes science nonsense. Everything that happened was strictly logical according to the laws of physics which happened to apply in that part of the world.

== Other activities ==
In the 1970s Postgate and Firmin worked with Michael Rosen on a Teaching to Read series on BBC Schools TV called Sam on Boff's Island.

In the 1970s and 1980s Postgate was active in the anti-nuclear campaign, addressing meetings and writing several pamphlets including The Writing on the Sky.

In 1986, in collaboration with the historian Naomi Linnell, Postgate painted a 50-foot-long (15 m) Illumination of the Life and Death of Thomas Becket for a book of the same name, which is now in the archive of the Royal Museum and Art Gallery, Canterbury. In 1990 he painted a similar work on Christopher Columbus for a book entitled The Triumphant Failure. A Canterbury Chronicle, a triptych by Postgate commissioned in 1990 hangs in the Great Hall of Eliot College on the University of Kent's Canterbury campus.

Postgate narrated the six-part BBC Radio 4 comedy series Elastic Planet in 1995.

In his later years, he blogged for the New Statesman. Postgate's voice was heard once more in 2003, as narrator for Alchemists of Sound, a television documentary about the BBC Radiophonic Workshop. On 15 July 2007, he was guest on BBC Radio 4's Desert Island Discs. He was also a guest on The Russell Brand Show on 19 January 2008 where he discussed the making of Bagpuss and his subsequent work in TV and Film.

In 1987 the University of Kent at Canterbury awarded an honorary degree to Postgate, who stated that the degree was really intended for Bagpuss, who was subsequently displayed in academic dress.

== Personal life ==
Postgate married Prudence "Prue" Myers in 1957, becoming stepfather to her three children. The couple had three sons, including Daniel Postgate. Prue died of cancer in 1982. Naomi Linnell was his partner for the last twenty-three years of his life.

Postgate's autobiography, Seeing Things, was published in 2000, and his son Daniel wrote an afterword which was added to the book after his father's death in 2008.

His grandfather was Labour Party leader (1932–1935) George Lansbury and he was cousin to English born American actress Angela Lansbury. He is distantly related to the Australian-born writer and academic Coral Lansbury, whose son Malcolm Turnbull became the 29th Prime Minister of Australia.

== Death ==
Postgate died at a nursing home in Broadstairs, near his home on the Kent coast, on 8 December 2008, aged 83.

After his death there was huge recognition of his influence and effect on British culture, and affection for the role his work had played in many people's lives. His work was widely discussed in the UK media and many tributes were paid to him and his work across the internet. Charlie Brooker dedicated a portion of his Screenwipe show to Postgate, and his influence on Brooker's own childhood, in an episode that was broadcast the day after Postgate's death.

== Publications ==
- The Burglarproof Bath Plug – A Collection of Memories, Thoughts and Small Stories Including "The Trouble with Magic", Oliver Postgate 2008 foreword by Stephen Fry ISBN 978-1-903708-27-9
- Seeing Things: An Autobiography, Oliver Postgate; illustrated by Peter Firmin, 2000 – ISBN 0-330-39000-7; republished in 2009 – ISBN 978-1-84767-840-9
- The Writing on the Sky, Oliver Postgate 1982 – ISBN 0-903400-89-8
- BECKET, Oliver Postgate & Naomi Linnell 1989 – ISBN 0-86272-405-8
- Columbus, the Triumphant Failure, Oliver Postgate & Naomi Linnell 1991 ISBN 0-86272-738-3
- The Sagas of Noggin the Nog Oliver Postgate and Peter Firmin; illustrated by Peter Firmin, 2001 – ISBN 978-1-903708-22-4
- Thinking It Through: The Plain Man's Guide to the Bomb, Oliver Postgate 1981 ISBN 0-903400-73-1
