= Bagpuss =

1974 British stop-motion animated TV series

- The opening sequence of Bagpuss features a series of sepia toned photographs, which suggest the Victorian or Edwardian period.
- Created by: Peter Firmin; Oliver Postgate
- Voices of: Oliver Postgate; Sandra Kerr; John Faulkner
- Narrated by: Oliver Postgate
- Country of origin: United Kingdom
- No. of seasons: 1
- No. of episodes: 13

Production
- Production company: Smallfilms

Original release
- Network: BBC
- Release: 12 February – 7 May 1974

Bagpuss is a British animated children's television series which was made by Peter Firmin and Oliver Postgate through their company Smallfilms. The series of thirteen episodes was first broadcast from 12 February to 7 May 1974. The title character was "a saggy, old cloth cat, baggy, and a bit loose at the seams". Although only thirteen episodes were produced and broadcast, the programme remains fondly remembered by Britons, and was frequently repeated in the UK until 1986. In early 1999, Bagpuss topped a BBC poll for the UK's favourite children's television programme.

== Characters ==
Bagpuss himself is a stuffed cloth cat, referred to in the intro as "the Most Important, the Most Beautiful, the Most Magical Saggy Old Cloth Cat in the Whole Wide World".

The six mice carved on the side of the "mouse organ" (a small mechanical pipe organ that played rolls of music) wake up and scurry around, singing in high-pitched voices. The names of the six mice are Charlie Mouse, Jenny Mouse, Janey Mouse, Lizzy Mouse, Eddie Mouse and Willy Mouse, although only three of the mice are ever referred to by their name; the remaining three are named only in the books which accompany the series.

A rag doll made of scraps, called Madeleine, sits in a wicker chair. Gabriel the toad, unlike most Smallfilms characters, could move by a special device beneath his can without the use of stop-motion animation.

The wooden woodpecker bookend became the drily academic Professor Yaffle (based on the philosopher Bertrand Russell, whom Postgate had once met).

== Voices and music ==
Sandra Kerr and John Faulkner provided the voices of Madeleine and Gabriel respectively, and put together and performed all the folk songs. All the other characters' voices, including that of the narrator, were performed by writer Oliver Postgate.

The Mouse song, often called "The Mouse Organ Song (We Will Fix It)", is set to a tune adapted from 13th century "Sumer is icumen in", one of the oldest known songs written in English.

== Format ==
The scene is set at the turn of the 20th century, with Emily Firmin (Peter Firmin's daughter) playing the part of the Victorian child Emily. The first antique village vignette is a cropped image of Horrabridge, Devon, taken in 1898, though nothing is known of the other photo of the children with the pram. The shop window was at the Firmin family home in Blean, Kent.

Each episode begins in the same way: through a series of sepia photographs, the viewer is told of a little girl named Emily who owns a shop. She never sells any merchandise, but instead finds lost or broken objects and later displays them in the front window after they have been mended so their owners might come in and reclaim them.

Emily leaves an object in front of her favourite stuffed toy, a large, saggy, pink-and-white striped cloth cat named Bagpuss, and recites the following verse:

Bagpuss, dear Bagpuss
Old Fat Furry Catpuss
Wake up and look at this thing that I bring
Wake up, be bright, be golden and light
Bagpuss, oh hear what I sing

After Emily departs, Bagpuss wakes up. The programme shifts from sepia to colour stop motion film and various toys in the shop come to life.

After being introduced by the narrator, the toys discuss what the new object is; one of them tells a story related to the object (sometimes shown in an animated thought bubble over Bagpuss's head), often with a song, accompanied by Gabriel on the banjo (which often sounded a lot more like a guitar) and then the mice, singing in high-pitched squeaky harmony to the tune of Sumer is icumen in as they work, mending the broken object. There is much banter between the characters, with the pompous Yaffle constantly finding fault with the playful mice: his complaint, "Those mice are never serious!", becomes his main catchphrase. Peace is always restored by the end of the episode, however, usually thanks to the timely intervention of Bagpuss, Gabriel or Madeleine. The newly mended object is then placed in the shop window, so that its owner might see it as they pass and come in to collect it. Bagpuss yawns and goes to sleep, and the colour fades to sepia and the other toys freeze in place as the narrator says the following:

And so their work was done.
Bagpuss gave a big yawn and settled down to sleep
And, of course, when Bagpuss goes to sleep,
All his friends go to sleep too.
The mice were ornaments on the mouse organ.
Gabriel and Madeleine were just dolls.
And Professor Yaffle was a carved, wooden bookend in the shape of a woodpecker.
Even Bagpuss himself, once he was asleep, was just an old, saggy cloth cat.
Baggy, and a bit loose at the seams,
But Emily loved him.

== Broadcasting ==
The series was originally broadcast in the United Kingdom, at 1:45 pm, on BBC1. The BBC sold the series to the Dutch broadcaster Nederlandse Christelijke Radio Vereniging and the series was transmitted in the Netherlands from October 1976. The series was also transmitted in Italy from February 1977.

== Episodes ==
The titles of the episodes each refer in some way to the object Emily found.

No.	Title	Original release date
1	"Ship in a Bottle"	12 February 1974
Some splints of wood are shaken out of a bottle by the mice. Bagpuss tells a story about mermaids and the magic repairs the model ship. The mice put it back into the bottle and raise the sails.
2	"The Owls of Athens"	19 February 1974
A dirty rag reveals a picture of an owl. Once cleaned, Madeleine recounts a story explaining why owls sound like they do. Gabriel recounts in song the story of a king who needed a cushion to sit on.
3	"The Frog Princess"	26 February 1974
Assorted jewels, which initially are thought to represent a cat and a bird but which Gabriel decides were the crown jewels of a frog princess.
4	"The Ballet Shoe"	5 March 1974
Put to inventive use by the mice, and the subject of a very silly song about its possible use as a rowing boat.
5	"The Hamish"	12 March 1974
A tartan porcupine pincushion, and a legend of a small, soft creature from Scotland.
6	"The Wise Man"	19 March 1974
A broken figurine of a Chinese man (the Wise Man of Ling-Po, Yaffle explains) and a turtle.
7	"The Elephant"	26 March 1974
An elephant figure missing its ears.
8	"The Mouse Mill"	2 April 1974
A wooden toy mill demonstrated by the mice to make chocolate biscuits out of breadcrumbs and butterbeans. This turns out to be a mischievous fraud. Gabriel and Madeleine sing a song about how ploughmen, farmers, millers, and bakers work at different stages of bread production. Even stern old Professor Yaffle cries.
9	"The Giant"	9 April 1974
A statuette and a lesson about how sizes are relative.
10	"The Old Man's Beard"	16 April 1974
A tangly plant (Clematis vitalba seeding), and a loom for weaving.
11	"The Fiddle"	23 April 1974
A fiddle that plays itself, and a leprechaun.
12	"Flying"	30 April 1974
A basket that the mice attempt to turn into a flying machine. Professor Yaffle recites a poem about Percy Pratt, a man who apparently invented the aeroplane.
13	"Uncle Feedle"	7 May 1974
A piece of cloth, destined to be a house for a rag doll.

== Production ==
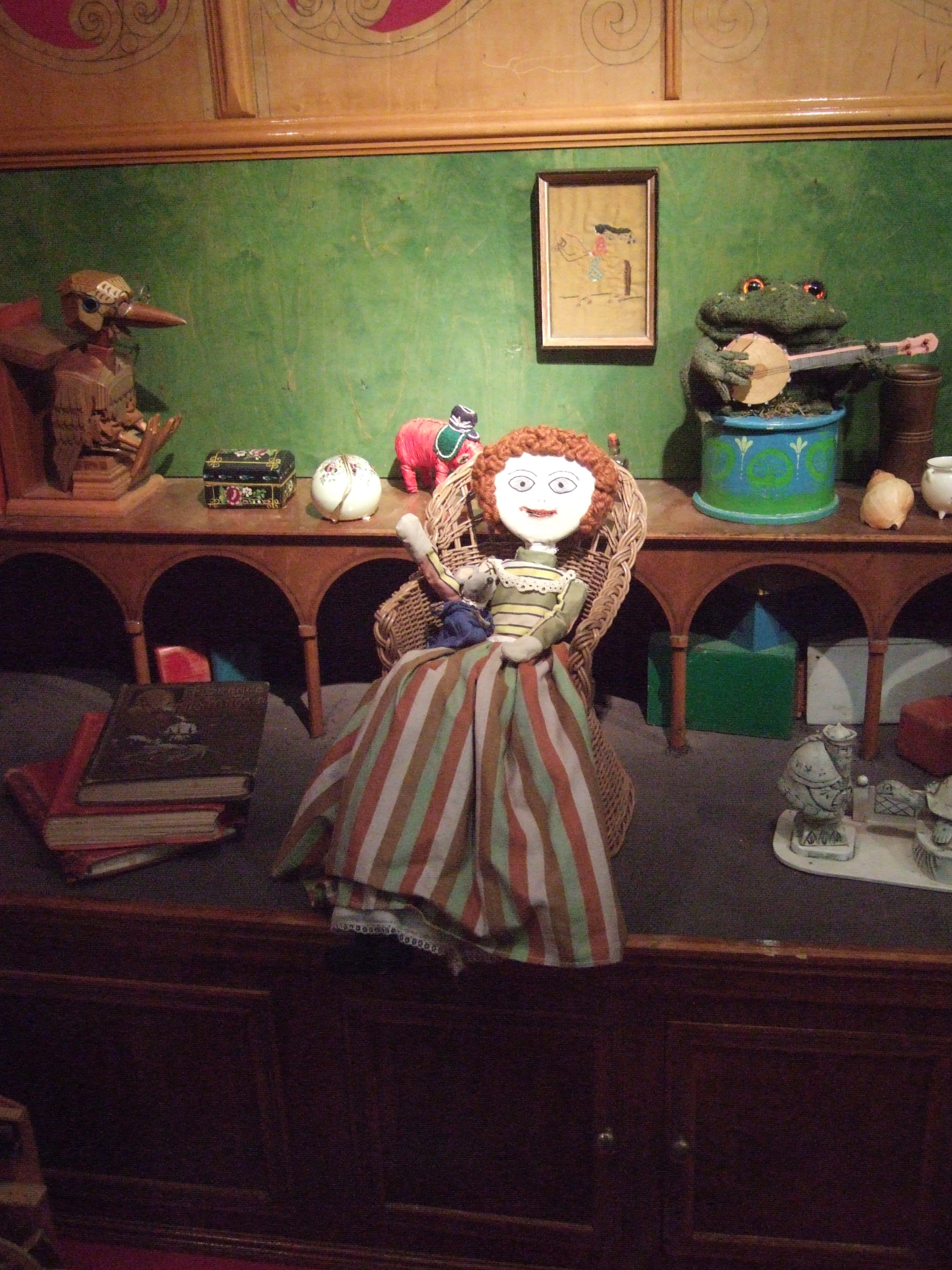
Some of the characters from Bagpuss

The programmes were made using stop-frame animation. Bagpuss is an actual cloth cat, but was not intended to be such an electric pink. In Firmin's words: "It should have been a ginger marmalade cat but the company in Folkestone dyeing the material made a mistake and it turned out pink and cream. It was the best thing that ever happened".

Madeleine the rag doll was made by Firmin's wife, Joan, with an extra long dress to hold their children's nightdresses, but Postgate asked Joan to make a new version as one of the characters.

Gabriel the Toad was the only character in the series who could move freely without the use of stop-frame animation. Scenes featuring him playing the banjo and singing would have taken quite a bit of time if filmed with the stop-frame method, so Peter Firmin created a mechanism that helped him control Gabriel through a hole in his can. The character was based on a real toad that lived in the basement area of the flat that Peter and Joan rented in Twickenham beside the River Thames. Gabriel (named after Walter Gabriel in The Archers, a long-running British radio soap opera) was originally made for Firmin's live ITV programme The Musical Box. Postgate chose him to be one of the characters in Bagpuss and he was made into a new, slightly larger version.

Professor Yaffle was created as the book-end who had access to "facts". The BBC did not like the original character, a man in top hat made from black Irish bog-wood, called "Professor Bogwood". They thought he was too frightening and asked for a non-human instead.

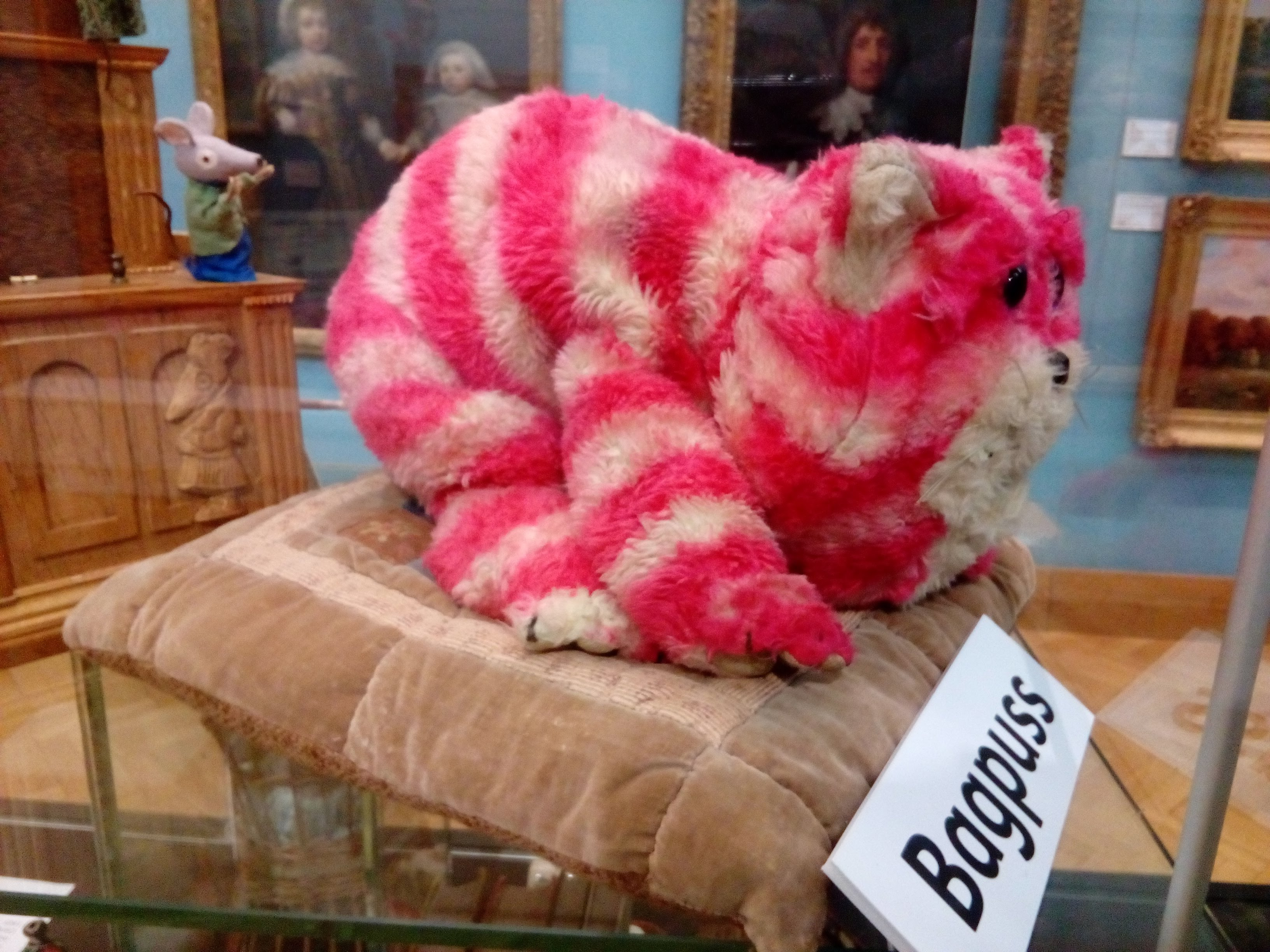
The original Bagpuss puppet in the Beaney House of Art and Knowledge in Canterbury, June 2018.

Most of the stories and songs used in the series are based on folk songs and fairy tales from around the world.

== Legacy ==
In 1987, the University of Kent at Canterbury awarded honorary degrees to Postgate and Firmin. In his speech, Postgate stated that the degree was really intended for Bagpuss, who was subsequently displayed in academic dress.

In 1999, Bagpuss came first in a BBC poll selecting the nation's favourite children's programme made and broadcast by that corporation. It also came fourth in the Channel 4 poll, The 100 Greatest Kids' TV Shows, broadcast in 2001.

In 2002 and 2005, a stage show of Bagpuss songs toured the UK folk festivals and theatres with original singers Sandra Kerr and John Faulkner, along with Kerr's daughter Nancy Kerr and her husband, James Fagan.

In June 2002, the charity Hospices of Hope opened the Bagpuss Children's Wing in its hospice in Brașov, Romania. The wing was funded entirely by Postgate from royalties received from the BBC. In April 2012, Marc Jenner from Royal Tunbridge Wells in Kent ran in the Virgin London Marathon dressed in a 7-foot (2.1 m) Bagpuss costume to raise money for the charity, supported by Emily Firmin (seen in the programme's opening titles) and Postgate's family.

Bagpuss inspired the 2003 Radiohead single "There There", which has the subtitle "The Boney King of Nowhere", a song from Bagpuss. The songwriter, Thom Yorke, asked Postgate to create the music video for "There There", but Postgate declined as he was retired.

In 2009 Coolabi revealed that it had signed an "exclusive new option to develop and produce new content" based on Bagpuss, as they held the merchandising and distribution rights. Daniel Postgate, the son of co-creator Oliver Postgate, said he did not want a "lightweight" remake using CGI animation. He said CGI had "a slightly lurid quality, even at the best of times".

Bagpuss appeared on one of the twelve postage stamps issued by Royal Mail in January 2014 to celebrate classic children's programmes.

Bagpuss was displayed with Rupert Bear in the Rupert Bear Museum in Canterbury, part of the Canterbury Heritage Museum. After its closure at the end of 2017, he and Rupert Bear moved to the Beaney House of Art and Knowledge in Canterbury.

The first episode of the BBC show Man Like Mobeen was called "Bagpuss".

== Film adaptation ==
A Bagpuss film adaptation of the series is in development since 2025 and is developed by Threewise Entertainment, in collaboration with the estates of Oliver Postgate and Peter Firmin. It is scheduled for release in 2027.

== Home media ==
=== VHS ===
VHS video title	Year of release	Episodes
Bagpuss	1 March 1993	"The Owls of Athens", "Flying", "The Mouse Mill", "The Ballet Shoe", "Uncle Feedle"
Bagpuss (Re-Release)	16 June 1997	"The Owls of Athens", "Flying", "The Mouse Mill", "The Ballet Shoe", "Uncle Feedle"
Bagpuss: The Complete Series	10 May 1999	"Ship in a Bottle", "The Owls of Athens", "The Frog Princess", "The Ballet Shoe", "The Hamish", "The Wise Man", "The Elephant", "The Mouse Mill", "The Giant", "The Old Man's Beard", "The Fiddle", "Flying", "Uncle Feedle" (all 13 episodes)
Bagpuss: The Ballet Shoe and other stories	18 April 2001	"The Ballet Shoe", "Uncle Feedle", "Flying"
Bagpuss: The Mouse Mill and other stories	18 April 2001	"The Mouse Mill", "The Hamish", "The Wise Man"
Bagpuss: Ship in the Bottle and other stories	21 April 2003	"Ship in a Bottle", "The Owls of Athens", "The Giant"
Bagpuss: Frog Princess and other stories	21 April 2003	"The Frog Princess", "The Elephant", "The Old Man's Beard"

=== DVD and Blu-ray ===
The full series was first released on DVD in April 2005. The full series was re-released in 2023 on Blu-ray and DVD to celebrate the 50th anniversary of Bagpuss. This release included "Peter Firmin – At Home with Bagpuss" and "The Story of Smallfilms" as extra features.

=== BBC iPlayer ===
The entire series was released onto the BBC iPlayer for the first time in May 2021.

=== Music ===
A CD of the original songs was released in 1999. The CD was re-released as well as a vinyl LP, again of the original songs from the series, in 2018.

=== Books ===
Several books have been released over the years to accompany the series.

- The Bagpuss Annual (1974)
- The Second Bagpuss Annual (1975)
- Mr Rumbletum's Gumboot (1975)
- The Song of the Pongo (1975)
- Silly Old Uncle Feedle (1975)
- Bagpuss in the Sun (1975)
- Bagpuss on a Rainy Day (1975)
- The New Bagpuss Annual 2001 (2000)
- Little Book Of Bagpuss (2005)
- The Big Book of Bagpuss (2007)
- Happy Birthday Bagpuss! (2014)
