= Raymond Postgate =

English socialist, writer, editor and historian (1896–1971)

- Postgate in April 1970
- Born: 6 November 1896; Cambridge, England
- Died: 29 March 1971 (aged 74); Canterbury, Kent, England
- Occupations: Writer; journalist; editor
- Parent(s): John Percival Postgate and Edith Allen
- Relatives: Oliver Postgate (son); John Postgate (son); Margaret Cole (sister)
- Writing career
- Language: English

Raymond William Postgate (6 November 1896 – 29 March 1971) was an English socialist, writer, journalist and editor, social historian, mystery novelist, and gourmet who founded the Good Food Guide. He was a member of the Postgate family.

== Early life ==
Raymond Postgate was born in Cambridge, England, the eldest son of John Percival Postgate and Edith Allen. He was educated at St John's College, Oxford, where, despite being sent down for a period because of his pacifism, he gained a First in Honour Moderations in 1917.

Postgate sought exemption from World War I military service as a conscientious objector on socialist grounds, but was allowed only non-combatant service in the army, which he refused to accept. Arrested by the civil police, he was brought before Oxford Magistrates' Court, which handed him over to the Army. Transferred to Cowley Barracks, Oxford, for forcible enlistment in the Non-Combatant Corps, he was within five days found medically unfit for service and discharged. Fearful of a possible further attempt at conscription, he went "on the run" for a period. While he was in Army hands, his sister Margaret campaigned on his behalf, in the process meeting the socialist writer and economist G. D. H. Cole, whom she subsequently married. In 1918 Postgate married Daisy Lansbury, daughter of the journalist and Labour Party politician George Lansbury, and was barred from the family home by his Tory father.

== Communist period ==
From 1918, Postgate worked as a journalist on the Daily Herald, then edited by his father-in-law, Lansbury. In 1920, Postgate published Bolshevik Theory, a book brought to Lenin’s attention by H. G. Wells. Impressed with the analysis therein, Lenin sent a signed photograph to Postgate, which he kept for the rest of his life. A founding member of the British Communist Party (CPGB) in 1920, Postgate left the Herald to join his colleague Francis Meynell on the staff of the party's first weekly newspaper, The Communist. Postgate soon became its editor and was briefly a major propagandist for the communist cause, but he left the party after falling out with its leadership in 1922, when the Communist International insisted that British communists follow the Moscow line. As such, he was one of Britain's first left-wing former communists, and the party came to treat him as an archetypal bourgeois intellectual renegade. He remained a key player in left journalism, however, returning to the Herald, then joining Lansbury on Lansbury's Labour Weekly in 1925–1927.

== Later career ==
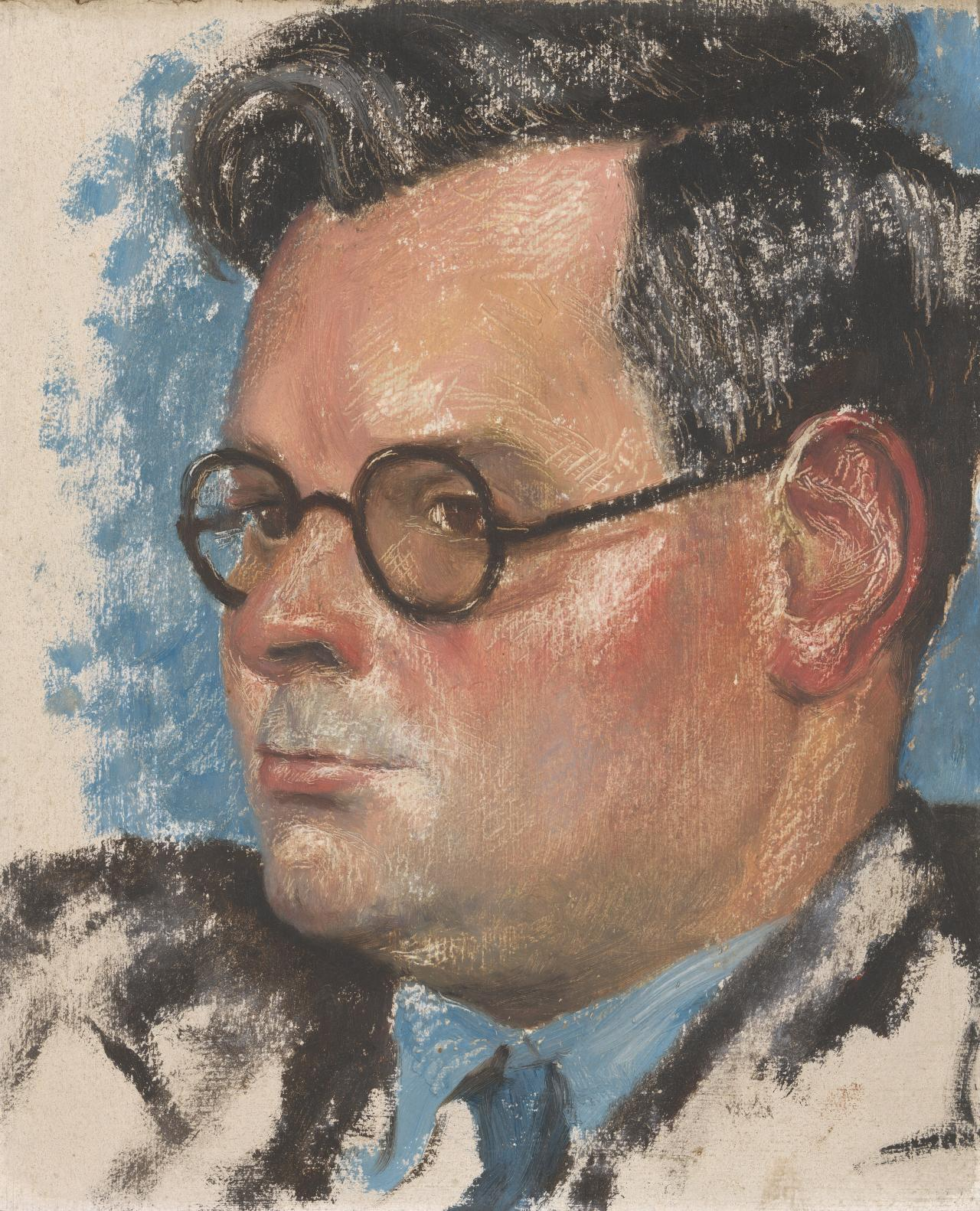
Raymond Postgate, by Stella Bowen, 1934. National Gallery of Victoria, Melbourne

In the late 1920s and early 1930s, Postgate published biographies of John Wilkes and Robert Emmet and his first novel, No Epitaph (1932), and worked as an editor for the Encyclopædia Britannica. In 1932, he visited the Soviet Union with a Fabian delegation and contributed to the collection Twelve Studies in Soviet Russia. Later in the 1930s, he co-authored with his brother-in-law G. D. H. Cole The Common People, a social history of Britain from the mid-18th century.

Postgate edited the left-wing monthly Fact from 1937 to 1939, which featured a monograph on a different subject in each issue. Fact published material by several well-known left-wing writers, including Ernest Hemingway's reports on the Spanish Civil War, C. L. R. James's 1938 "A History of Negro Revolt" and Storm Jameson's essay "Documents". Postgate then edited the socialist weekly Tribune from early 1940 until the end of 1941. Tribune had previously been a pro-Soviet publication: however, the Soviet fellow travellers at Tribune were either dismissed, or, in Postgate's words "left soon after in dislike of me". Under Postgate's editorship, Tribune would express "critical support" for the Churchill government and condemn the Communist Party.

Postgate's anti-fascism led him to move away from his earlier pacifism. Postgate supported the Second World War and joined the Home Guard near his home in Finchley, London. In 1942, he obtained a post as a temporary civil servant in the wartime Board of Trade, concerned with the control of rationed supplies, and he remained in the Service for eight years. He continued his left-wing writings, and his question-and-answer pamphlet "Why You Should Be A Socialist", widely distributed among the returning military as the war ended, probably contributed significantly to the Labour Party's post-war landslide victory.

In the post-war period, Postgate continued to be critical of Russia under Stalin, viewing its direction as an abandonment of socialist ideals.

Always interested in food and wine, after World War II, Postgate wrote a regular column on the poor state of British gastronomy for the pocket magazine Lilliput. In these, inspired by the example of a French travel guide called Le Club des Sans Club, he invited readers to send him reports on eating places throughout the UK, which he would collate and publish. The response was overwhelming, and Postgate's notional "Society for the Prevention of Cruelty to Food", as he had called it, developed into the Good Food Guide, becoming independent of Lilliput and its successor, The Leader. The Guide's first issue came out in 1951; it accepted no advertisements and still relied on volunteers to visit and report on UK restaurants. As well as democratising ordinary eating out, Postgate sought to demystify the aura surrounding wine, and the flowery language widely used to describe wine flavours. His "A Plain Man's Guide To Wine" undoubtedly did much to make Britain more of a wine-drinking nation. In 1965, Postgate wrote an article in Holiday magazine in which he warned readers against Babycham, which "looks like champagne and is served in champagne glasses [but] is made of pears". The company sued for libel, but Postgate was acquitted, and was awarded costs. His distinctly amateur writings on both food and wine, though highly influential in Britain in their time, did not endear him to professionals in the catering and wine trades, who avoided referring to him; however, his activities were much appreciated in France, where in 1951 he had been made the first British "Peer of the Jurade of St Emilion".

He continued to work as a journalist, mainly on the Co-operative movement's Sunday paper, Reynolds' News, and during the 1950s and 1960s published several historical works and a biography of his father-in-law entitled The Life of George Lansbury.

Postgate wrote several mystery novels that drew on his socialist beliefs to set crime, detection and punishment in a broader social and economic context. His most famous novel is Verdict of Twelve (1940), his other novels include Somebody at the Door (1943) and The Ledger Is Kept (1953). (His sister and brother-in-law, the Coles, also became a successful mystery-writing duo.) After the death of H. G. Wells, Postgate edited some revisions of the two-volume Outline of History that Wells had first published in 1920.

== Death and legacy ==
Raymond Postgate died aged 74, on 29 March 1971; his wife Daisy committed suicide a month later.

Postgate's younger son, Oliver Postgate, also a conscientious objector though in World War II, became a leading creator of children's television programmes in the UK including Bagpuss, Ivor the Engine and The Clangers. Oliver's brother was the microbiologist and writer John Postgate FRS.

== Selected bibliography ==
- The Workers’ International (1920)
- That Devil Wilkes (1929)
- Dear Robert Emmet (1932)
- England Goes to Press (1937)
- Verdict of Twelve (1940)
- Somebody at the Door (1942)
- The Good Food Guide
- The Life of George Lansbury (1951)
- The Ledger is Kept (1958)
- Story of the Year, 1798 (1969)

== Notes ==
Media offices
Preceded by Francis Meynell	Editor of The Communist; 1921–1922	Succeeded by Thomas A. Jackson
Preceded by H. J. Hartshorn	Editor of Tribune; 1940–1941	Succeeded by Aneurin Bevan and Jon Kimche
