= Food adulteration =

Addition of inappropriate substances to food

Food adulteration refers to the practice of secretly adding extra substances, known as adulterants, to food. Primarily, the deliberate altering of food is done for economic advantage. Lower legal standards and improper law enforcement are among other reasons.

== Causes ==
Food adulteration arises from various factors, with one of the major primary causes being the dishonest practices of traders striving for quick and easy profits. Powdered food products are particularly vulnerable due to their complicated supply chain and slowly decline in nutritional and quality over time. Furthermore, unethical measures are frequently employed to retain the freshness of food and reduce financial losses generated by spoilage during transportation and sales. These practices involve the addition of adulterants to boost volume, the use of thickening agents to avoid dilution and upgrade solids content, the alternative of missing fat, carbohydrate or protein, the delay of shelf life, improvement of the food's visual appeal, and the generation of a more genuine appearance.

== Research ==
According to researchers, food adulteration has existed from historical times and is still prevalent. Several modern analytical methods have been developed and are used to detect food adulteration.

Detection methods in Europe and others -

- Vibrational spectroscopies - near-infrared and mid-infrared
- NMR spectroscopy
- A range of mass spectrometry (MS) techniques, amongst others.
- DNA-based, sensory, physicochemical and chromatographic methods

== Impact ==
Despite the known harms caused by consumption of adulterated food, it is a global phenomenon. It also includes widely known regulated adulterations like addition of melamine in milk and spraying on vegetables. The 2008 Chinese milk scandal is among the few known events about the harm caused by the addition of melamine in milk.

In the European Union, food fraud and adulteration is a rising concern. According to the European Commission, economically motivated food fraud and adulteration causes damages of €8 to 12 billion every year.

== Types of adulteration ==
The Food Safety and Standards Authority of India identifies three general types of adulteration:

1. Intentional adulteration: refers to the addition of substances that have similar properties to the food in which it is mixed. This type of adulteration is difficult to detect due to similar properties
2. Incidental adulteration: refers to accidental addition of substances due to the negligence of proper hygiene in food during processing
3. Metallic adulteration: refers to the addition of metallic substances accidentally or intentionally.
