= Rupert Bear, Follow the Magic... =

British children's television series

- Created by: Mary Tourtel; Alfred Bestall; Andy Cutbill
- Directed by: Barry Purves
- Starring: Claire Skinner; Morwenna Banks; David Holt
- Composers: Mark Topham; Karl Twigg
- Country of origin: United Kingdom
- Original language: English
- No. of series: 4
- No. of episodes: 52

Production
- Producer: Francis Vose
- Running time: 10 minutes
- Production companies: Entertainment Rights; Cosgrove Hall Films

Original release
- Network: Five
- Release: 8 November 2006 – 1 February 2008

Rupert Bear: Follow the Magic... is a British animated children's television series based on the Mary Tourtel character, Rupert Bear. Aimed at pre-school children, the show is part stop motion, part computer-generated imagery. Rupert Bear still wears his trademark bright yellow plaid trousers and matching scarf, with a red jumper. Rupert has brown fur once again, just as he was originally drawn in 1920: when he appeared as a cartoon character in the Daily Express, they economised on ink by printing him white.

It was broadcast on Five from 8 November 2006 to 1 February 2008, as part of their Milkshake! block. 52 episodes were produced.

== Characters ==
- Rupert Bear – An adventure-loving bear who makes everyday into an exciting adventure to enjoy and often brings his friends along.
- Bill Badger – A fact-loving badger who is Rupert's best friend.
- Edward Trunk – A timid elephant.
- Ping Pong – A magical, female Pekingese.
- Ming – Ping Pong's pet baby dragon.
- Raggety – A young tree elf.
- Freddy and Freda – A pair of mischievous fox twins.
- Miranda – A beautiful and whimsical mermaid.
- Bruce – Rupert Bear's car.

== Description ==
Each episode follows an adventure in the woodland world of Nutwood, England. The characters go between Rupert's cottage, the friends' tree house, Ping Pong's colourful pagoda and the ocean, where Miranda lives.

== Episodes ==
=== Series 1 (2006) ===
No. overall	No. in series	Title	Directed by	Written by	Original release date
1	1	"Rupert's Wild Scooter Ride"	Barry Purves	Rachel Dawson	2006
Rupert is very skilled at riding his scooter, and drums up some magical assistance to go just that little bit faster.
2	2	"Rupert's Undersea Adventure"	Barry Purves	Rebecca Stevens	2006
Rupert, Bill and Ping Pong have to rescue Miranda the Mermaid from the clutches of a giant clam.
3	3	"Rupert Builds a Nest"	Barry Purves	Gillian Corderoy	2006
Rupert and Ping Pong find a broken bird's nest, containing two eggs, which the Fox Twins have accidentally knocked out of a tree. The mother bird is frantic and the friends are determined to save the eggs.
4	4	"Rupert and the Stargirl"	Barry Purves	Alison Stewart	2006
Rupert, Bill and Raggety meet Astra, a star child who has fallen to earth.
5	5	"Rupert and the Cloud Shepherd"	Barry Purves	Rebecca Stevens	2006
Rupert, Ping Pong, Bill and Ming help the Cloud Shepherd find some missing clouds that have sneaked away to play. But how can the friends get them back up into the sky?
6	6	"Rupert and the Magic Carpet"	Barry Purves	Laura Summers	2006
When Ming gets stuck up a tree, Rupert, Ping Pong and Bill try to rescue her but, thanks to Edward's mistakes, they all get stuck too. Can Edward overcome his fear of heights and save them?
7	7	"Rupert and the Cheeky Sneeze"	Barry Purves	Elly Brewer	2006
When one of Rupert's sneezes escapes, the friends have to find it a home in the forest.
8	8	"Rupert and the Special Sandcastle"	Barry Purves	Rachel Dawson	2006
Despite Miranda's warnings, a sandcastle competition in Rocky Bay is in danger from the incoming tide.
9	9	"Rupert and the Magic Lantern"	Barry Purves	Rebecca Stevens	2006
Rupert, Edward and Bill go camping, but the Fox Twins play tricks on them.
10	10	"Rupert's Treasure Hunt"	Barry Purves	Steve Jeanes	2006
Whilst Rupert, Ping Pong, Bill and Ming enjoy an impromptu treasure hunt in Nutwood, Raggety is getting the wood tidy for the annual visit of the Spring Inspector.
11	11	"Rupert Files to Cheddar Moon"	Barry Purves	Andy Cutbill	2006
When Ping Pong uses her magic to turn Rupert's pedal car into a spaceship, they fly to the moon. There they meet the Man on the Moon, who runs a cheese stall.
12	12	"Rupert and the Giant Egg Race"	Barry Purves	Jon Groves	2006
It's the day of the Nutwood Egg and Spoon race, but Raggety has magically turned Ping Pong into a giant egg. How can Rupert and his friends have their race now?
13	13	"Rupert's Magic Car"	Barry Purves	Gillian Corderoy	2006
Miranda the Mermaid has never been able to visit Nutwood — until Rupert has a clever idea.

=== Series 2 (2007) ===
No. overall	No. in series	Title	Directed by	Written by	Original release date
14	1	"Rupert and the Unusual Birthday"	Barry Purves	Rachel Dawson	2007
It's Edward's birthday and Rupert wants to give him the best birthday party ever.
15	2	"Rupert and the Rainbow"	Barry Purves	Laura Summers	2007
It's a colorful Nutwood when Rupert and Ping Pong try to use the Rainbow to paint pictures with.
16	3	"Rupert and the Toy Soldiers"	Barry Purves	Simon Nicholson	2007
When Ping Pong's spell to fix a broken toy Soldier goes wrong, Rupert and his friends need help from an unexpected source to get him back in the box.
17	4	"Rupert and the Giant Sunflower"	Barry Purves	Rebecca Stevens	2007
Rupert is very excited; Mother Nature has given him a special elixir to help his sunflower seeds grow, but there's a big surprise to come.
18	5	"Rupert and the Cuckoo Clock"	Barry Purves	Rachel Dawson	2007
When Mum's cuckoo clock breaks, time stops and Ping Pong, Ming, Edward and Bill freeze in time.
19	6	"Rupert and the Magic Books"	Barry Purves	Rebecca Stevens	2007
When Ping Pong says she is too busy to join a story reading day Raggety magically brings the books to life and they fly to Ping Pong's Pagoda, where they start to tell her their stories.
20	7	"Rupert and the Mischievous Genie"	Barry Purves	Laura Summers	2007
Rupert, Ping Pong, Bill, Edward and Raggety find some magical, musical stepping stones deep in the woods and unwittingly unleash a naughty young genie bent on making mischief.
21	8	"Rupert and the Scarecrow"	Barry Purves	Alison Stewart	2007
Rupert and the others meet a sad little scarecrow who's lonely and upset that the crows don't come near him.
22	9	"Rupert and the Octopus's Garden"	Barry Purves	Gillian Corderoy	2007
Ping Pong's magic accidentally brings a picture of an Octopus to life, and the friends need to stop it from causing chaos.
23	10	"Rupert and the Treasure Chest"	Barry Purves	Simon Nicholson	2007
An old Pirate tells Rupert he is searching for the treasure that will raise his sunken ship from the depths. How can Rupert help him?
24	11	"Rupert and the Magic Show"	Barry Purves	Simon Nicholson	2007
When Ping Pong's glow-worm trick goes wrong, it's her rival Bill who ends up helping out... with spectacular results.
25	12	"Rupert and the Missing Music"	Barry Purves	Gillian Corderoy	2007
Rupert asks Ping Pong to do some magic to make their band instruments play better, but the spell goes wrong.
26	13	"Rupert and the Weather Machine"	Barry Purves	Laura Summers	2007
When it starts raining sausages in Nutwood, Rupert and friends fly up to the Cloud Shepherd's home to find out what has happened to the weather machine.

=== Series 3 (2008) ===
No. overall	No. in series	Title	Directed by	Written by	Original release date
27	1	"Rupert and the Hilarious Hiccups"	Barry Purves	Rachel Dawson	2008
28	2	"Rupert and the Snowglobe"	Barry Purves	Rebecca Stevens	2008
29	3	"Rupert and the Dancing Shoes"	Barry Purves	Laura Summers (credited as Laura Summer)	2008
30	4	"Rupert and the Oldest Tree"	Barry Purves	Gillian Corderoy	2008
31	5	"Rupert and the Clockwork Dragon"	Barry Purves	Rebecca Stevens	2008
32	6	"Rupert and the Moon Adventure"	Barry Purves	Gillian Corderoy	2008
33	7	"Rupert and the Grumbleclouds"	Barry Purves	Rebecca Stevens	2008
34	8	"Rupert and the Playful Wind"	Barry Purves	TBD	2008
35	9	"Rupert's Bird's Eye View"	Barry Purves	Gillian Corderoy	2008
36	10	"Rupert and the Memory Man"	Barry Purves	TBD	2008
37	11	"Rupert and the Invisible Foxes"	Barry Purves	TBD	2008
38	12	"Rupert and the Dew Fairy"	Barry Purves	Gillian Corderoy	2008
39	13	"Rupert and the Apple River"	Barry Purves	TBD	2008

=== Series 4 (2008) ===
No. overall	No. in series	Title	Directed by	Written by	Original release date
40	1	"Rupert to the Rescue"	Barry Purves	TBD	2008
41	2	"Rupert and the Butterfly Collector"	Barry Purves	TBD	2008
42	3	"Rupert and the Lost Stars"	Barry Purves	Gillian Corderoy	2008
43	4	"Rupert and the Photo Finish"	Barry Purves	Jon Groves	2008
44	5	"Rupert Lights the Way"	Barry Purves	Rebecca Stevens	2008
45	6	"Rupert and the Sleepy Flowers"	Barry Purves	Simon Nicholson	2008
46	7	"Rupert and the Magical Puppets"	Barry Purves	TBD	2008
47	8	"Rupert and the Beehive"	Barry Purves	TBD	2008
48	9	"Rupert and the Lost Bird"	Barry Purves	Chris Allen	2008
49	10	"Rupert and the Sailing Race"	Barry Purves	TBD	2008
50	11	"Rupert and the Flying Dragon"	Barry Purves	Simon Nicholson	2008
Rupert tries to help Ming fly by attaching a balloon to him, but the wind blows Ming away.
51	12	"Rupert Saves Christmas"	Barry Purves	TBD	2008
52	13	"Rupert and the Snow Key"	Barry Purves	TBD	2008
