= Canterbury Heritage Museum =

History museum in Canterbury, Kent, England

Coordinates: 51°16′43″N 1°04′39″E

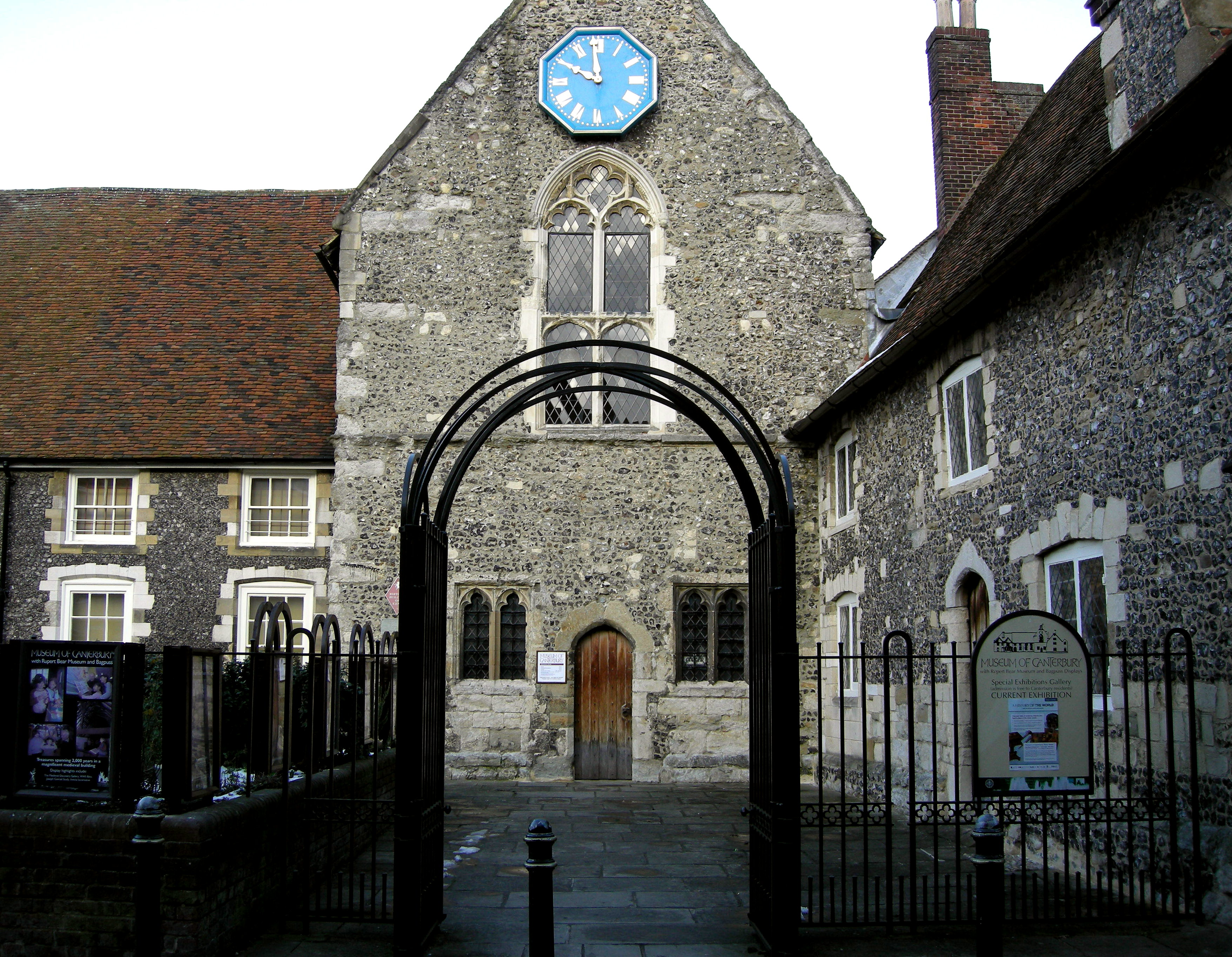
- Museum frontage
- Established: 1987
- Dissolved: 2018
- Location: Stour Street, Canterbury, Kent; CT1 2NR
- Type: Local history museum, Children's museum, Heritage museum
- Public transit access: Rail: Canterbury West; Canterbury East; Buses: National Express, Stagecoach
- Website: www.canterbury-museums.co.uk

The Canterbury Heritage Museum (formerly the Museum of Canterbury) was a museum in Stour Street, Canterbury, South East England, telling the history of the city. It was housed in the 12th-century Poor Priests' Hospital next to the River Stour. The museum exhibited the Canterbury Cross and contained a gallery dedicated to Rupert the Bear, whose creator Mary Tourtel lived in Canterbury. It held regular events and exhibitions of local and national interest. The museum closed in 2018. It has since re-opened as The Marlowe Kit; an escape room, exhibition and creative space.

== History ==
=== William Masters ===
The museum was founded by William Masters, a local nurseryman specializing in exotic plants, who went on to serve as Hon. Curator from 1823 to 1846.

=== Poor Priests' Hospital ===
The museum was in the medieval Poor Priests' Hospital with two adjoining buildings, backing on to the River Stour. From 1174 to 1207 the long, low block parallel to Stour Street was the stone house of a tanner, a rich minter and the minter's son, Alexander, who converted it into an almshouse in the name of the Virgin Mary for old and poor priests. The priests used the house as a hall, living, eating and sleeping around a central fire. In 1373 the solar and undercroft were added opposite the present gateway, to give privacy on the upper floor to the master of the hospital. At the other end of the original hall was the service quarter for servants with kitchen, pantry and buttery. Next to the solar is the Chapel of St Mary, which was designed as a single open space with a back kitchen. Two upper floors were later inserted, with windows and chimney. This set of buildings became secular in 1575: a school, poorhouse, workhouse and clinic. The museum was previously at the Beaney as the Heritage Museum, then was established in Stour Street in 1987 to celebrate local history, and the building restored to show the interior crown-post roof.

=== Closure and reopening ===
The museum was closed in 2018 after visitor numbers had dropped from 30,000 to less than 9,000 over the previous five years.

A campaign was led by local institutions, including Canterbury Archaeological Trust, to keep it open.

On 6 April 2019, the venue reopened with a year-long exhibition called The Marlowe Kit.

== Exhibits ==
=== Canterbury Heritage Museum ===
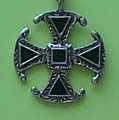
Modern replica brooch in the style of the Canterbury Cross

Exhibits in galleries and displays dated from pre-Roman to the present, and were arranged as a time walk from the earliest to latest, with a prehistoric and Anglo-Saxon display, medieval discovery gallery, Marlowe whodunit display, wartime Blitz experience, Joseph Conrad gallery, Bagpuss and Clangers display, Rupert Bear Museum, and an exhibitions gallery. There were interactive displays involving a microscope, a treasure chest and World War II plane-spotting. There was also a wing housing The 1900 House Victorian collection.

There was a tapestry, covering three walls, which showed the life-story of Thomas Becket. There was a display of bones found locally, with forensic analysis and reconstructed faces from the Meet the Ancestors show. A prized exhibit in the Saxon gallery was the Canterbury Cross, an 850 AD Saxon brooch found in St Georges Street in 1867. It is in the form of a consecration cross: traditionally one of twelve similar crosses marked on church walls to represent the apostles and the twelve anointings of the building by the bishop at consecration.

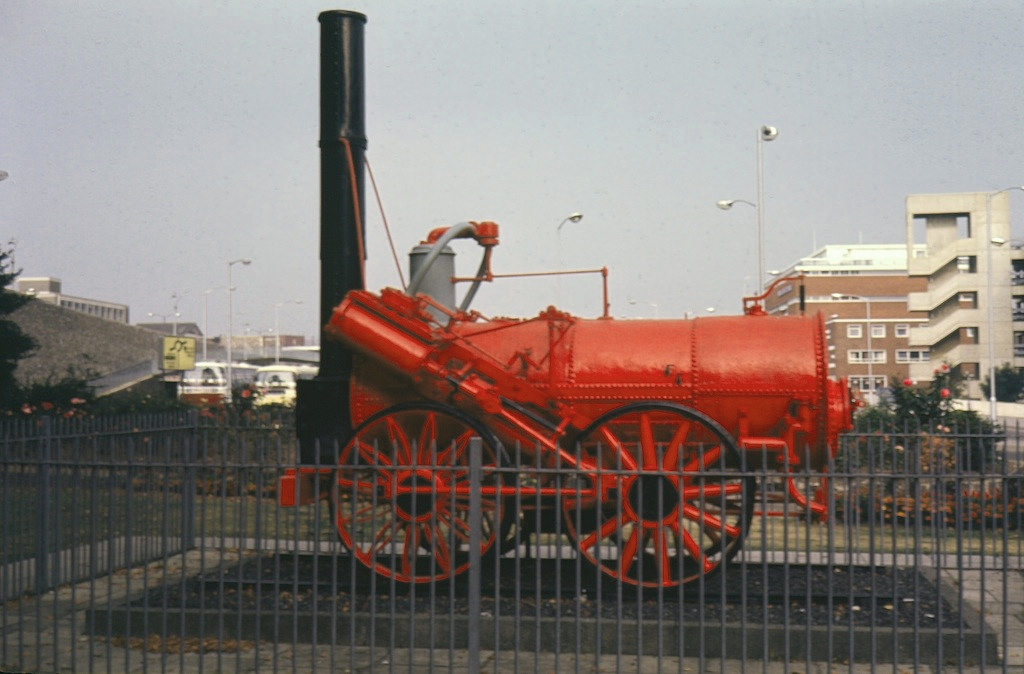
Invicta locomotive

There was also furniture, household objects, arms and armour, as well as the Canterbury Pendant: a Saxon silver portable sundial which was lent briefly in 2009 to Canterbury Cathedral for an exhibition. It was made in the form of a pendant, is ascribed to the silversmith St Dunstan (909−988 AD), and could probably only indicate the time accurately at noon. It was used to measure the time of prayer. It was found in the Cathedral cloisters during excavations in 1938. The Invicta locomotive was housed here. Between 2009 and 2012, Canterbury Heritage Museum held many of The Beaney's exhibits during its refurbishment, including the Sir Basil Dixwell by Van Dyck bought for £1 million by Canterbury in 2004; Sir Basil had lived at Broome Park near Canterbury.

=== Rupert Bear Museum ===
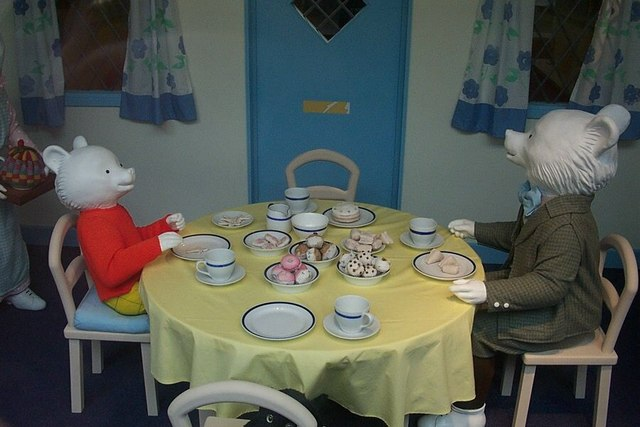
Rupert Bear exhibit

The Rupert Bear Museum was opened in 2003 with a £500,000 Heritage Lottery Fund grant. The creator of Rupert Bear, Mary Tourtel, grew up and attended art school in Canterbury, and a 1921 first-edition Rupert annual was one of the exhibits. The Rupert Bear Museum involves activities for children on the themes of play, entertainment and education. It includes the Bagpuss and Clangers display with items from the original television shows, such as the Emily shop-window from the opening scene of Bagpuss, because its creators Peter Firmin and Oliver Postgate filmed the programmes at Firmin's house near Canterbury.

The museum was supported by the Heritage Lottery Fund and Express Newspapers.

== Exhibitions, events and accessibility ==
Regular family interactive events were scheduled. In June 2008 there was a two-day celebration of the centenary of Ian Fleming's birth and of the James Bond films. In November 2008 there was a Rupert Bear Day, with the cartoon's new illustrator Stuart Trotter signing Rupert books. In July 2009 the museum celebrated the anniversary of Neil Armstrong's first moonwalk in 1969. It was an interactive event with the public chatting to astronomers and an astrodome showing a 3D tour of night sky and Solar System. In 2009 the museum celebrated an exhibition and a 40th anniversary of the Clangers TV show with two interactive events which included meetings with Peter Firmin, the show's co-creator. Oliver Postgate, the other creator of Bagpuss and the Clangers, lived locally and died in 2008, but his creations were given to the museum during his lifetime.

The museum was open seasonally between March and September and was also open during school holidays, with disabled access. An entrance fee was charged.
