= Canterbury Museum =

Canterbury Museum may refer to:

- Beaney House of Art and Knowledge, Canterbury, England
- Canterbury Heritage Museum, Canterbury, England
- Canterbury Museum, Christchurch, New Zealand
