= Consecration cross =

Consecration cross

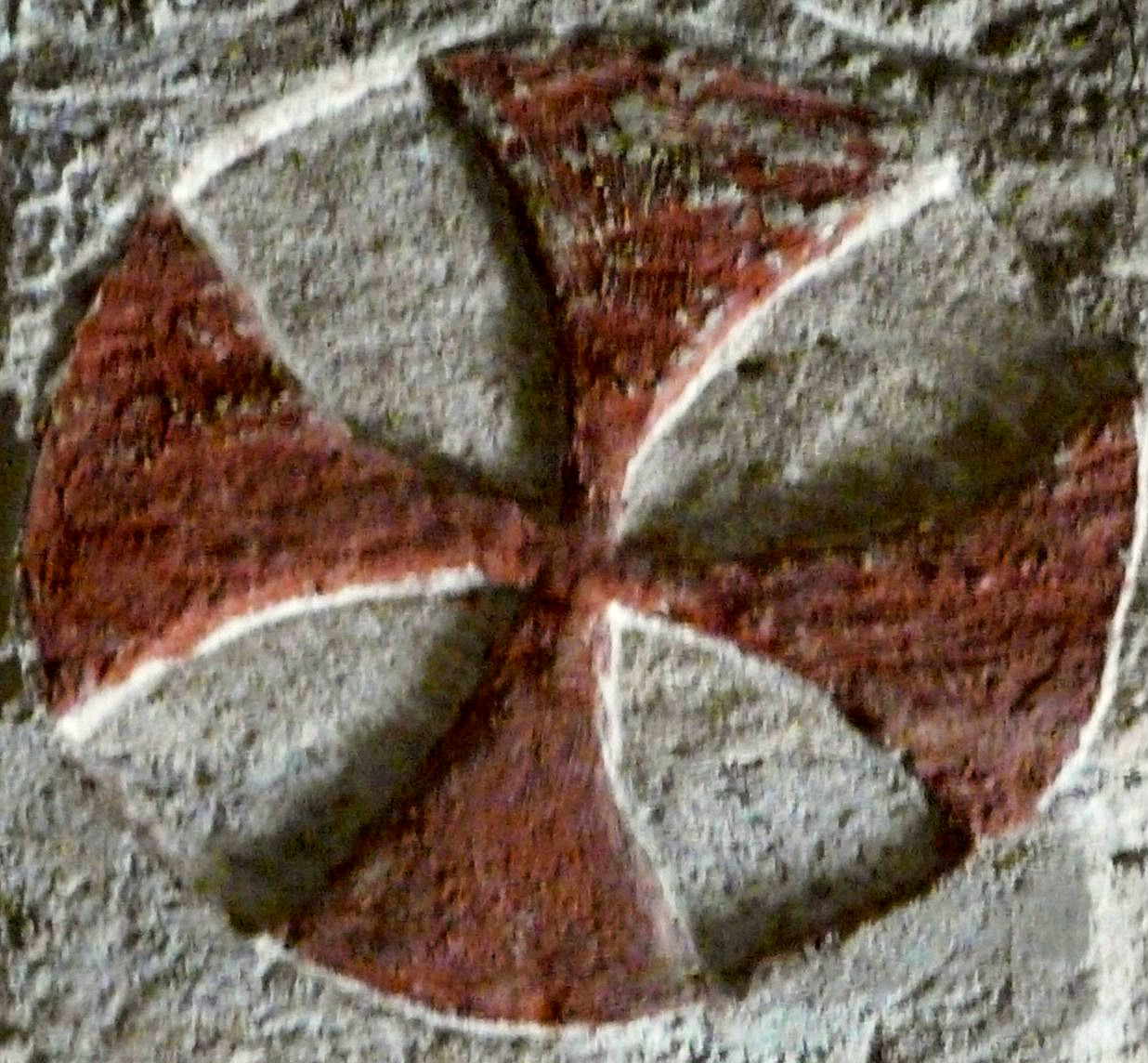
Consecration cross in the Church of Saint-Vaast, Villac, Dordogne, France

Consecration crosses are crosses on the interior walls and exterior architecture of a Christian church or cathedral showing where the bishop has anointed the church with chrism or holy water in order to consecrate it. There is often a place for a candle in front of each cross which is lit on the anniversary of the consecration. The crosses signify the sanctity of the church. The 13th-century Trinity Chapel in Salisbury Cathedral contains a painted consecration cross dating from 30 September 1225.

== History ==
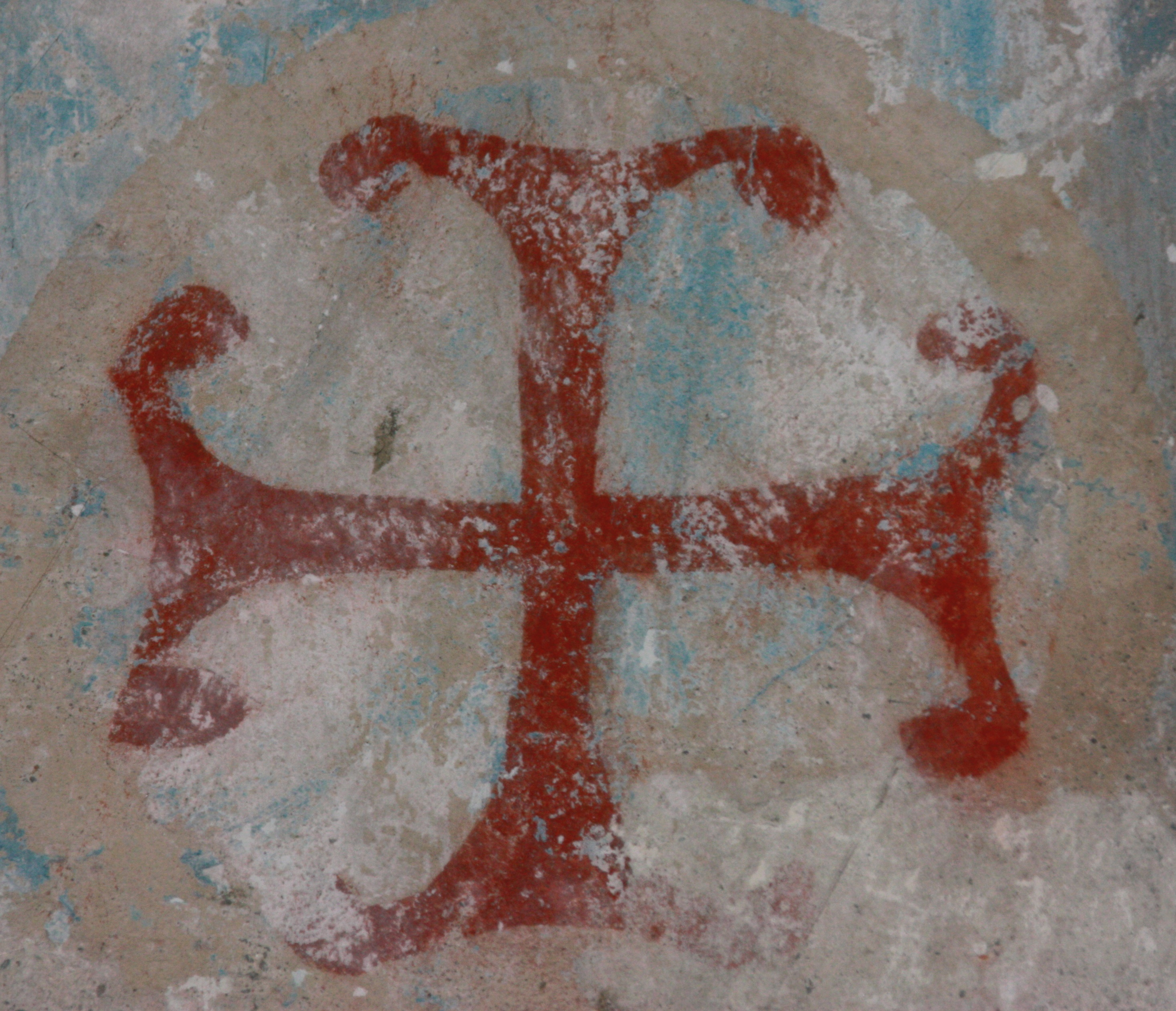
Cross in Metnitz, Austria

Before the time of the reign of Constantine between 306 and 337, the consecration of buildings to facilitate mass had to be private for fear of persecution, so physical consecration marks are unlikely to remain. There are various opinions as to the beginning of formal and public consecration of buildings. One version says that from Constantine's reign onward, a consecration was a public celebration to be commemorated in the following years, so that visual symbols of this event, such as writing the Greek and Roman alphabets on the church floor, became possible. Another version credits Theodosius I with starting the tradition between 379 and 395 by purifying pagan temples during the transition of the Roman Empire to Christianity.

== Symbolism ==
Consecration "imprints an indelible mark (St Thomas, II-II:34:3) on the building by reason of which it may never be transferred to common or profane uses." The physical mark of the consecration cross on the wall of a church signifies this.

== Material and form ==
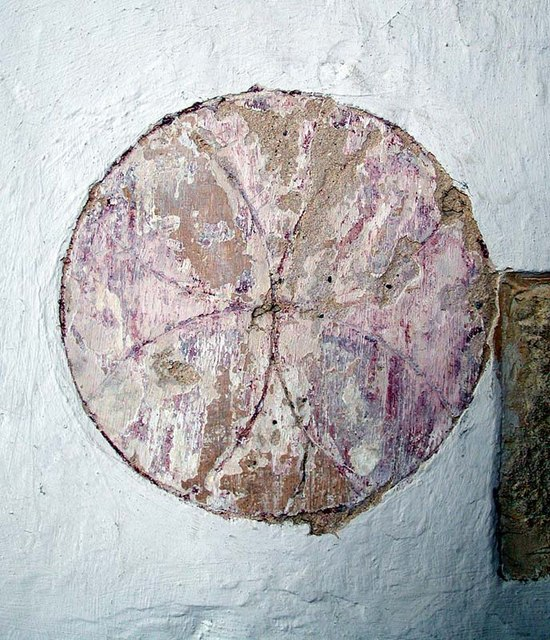
Cross in St Mary, Charlton-on-Otmoor

In the medieval tradition, the twelve interior crosses may be painted on plaster, or manufactured in an indestructible material and affixed to stone walls. The crosses tend to be placed high on the walls and to have a candle sconce fixed beneath. The twelve exterior crosses could be painted, engraved, carved or made of a different material and affixed.

The most common and ancient form of four curved arms of equal length within a circle could easily be constructed by a stonemason using a compass. This shape is also called a rounded cross. Its shape is not unlike the Bolnisi cross, cross pattée, iron cross and Canterbury cross. However the consecration cross exists in other traditional forms, such as the sun cross.

== Number and location ==
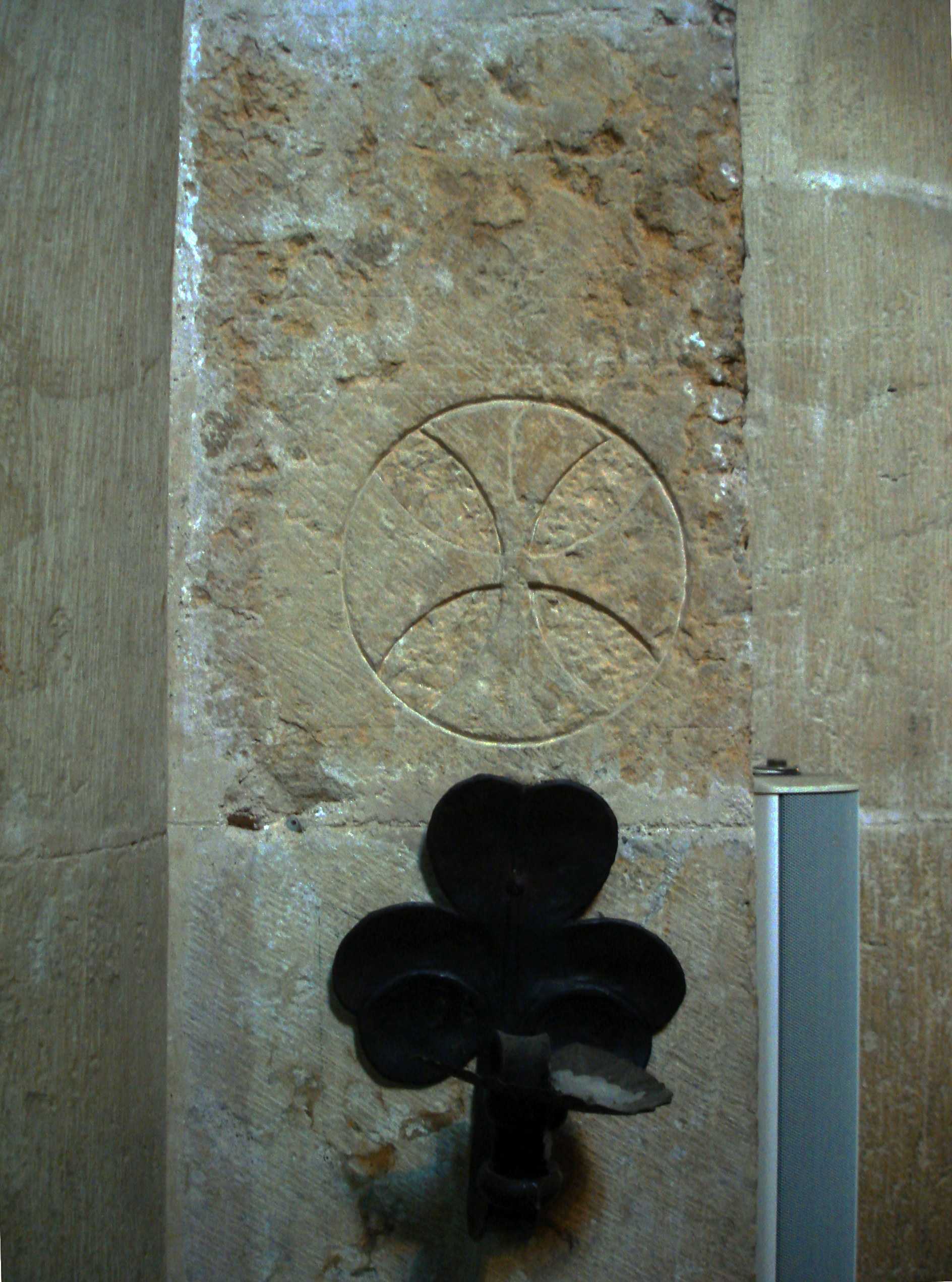
Cross with candle sconce in Coimbra Cathedral, Portugal

Typically, there might be twelve painted crosses high on plaster walls within a church, and others engraved outside on door frames, pillars or corners. However this depends on the era, the form of Christianity, the ritual used, and the form of the building. Since the bishop sprinkles the altar and floor with holy water crosses also, it is not impossible that permanent commemorative marks may be placed there. Some churches are very old and much changed, so in cases of good preservation one might find twelve crosses inside the earliest complete stone building, or a second set of twelve in a very large and reconsecrated rebuild where the new walls outsized the old.

== Churches with consecration crosses ==
=== Finland ===
A consecration cross in the coat of arms of Sastamala

The Sastamala Church in Karkku, Sastamala, has the restored remains of a limestone cross hanging on the wall. The Naantali church in Southwest Finland has eight painted crosses.

=== United Kingdom ===
As of 1912 Salisbury Cathedral had at least eight external crosses: three plain ones on the north wall, three on the east wall and two embossed ones on the south wall. The sacristy on the south wall and the statuary on the west frontage probably concealed the remaining four crosses. The extant crosses were carved into the stone buttresses. There were interior painted crosses corresponding to the positions of the exterior crosses. One of those Salisbury interior crosses commemorates the dedication of the Trinity Chapel on 30 September 1225. The ruined Elgin Cathedral and the Church of the Holy Rude in Stirling have crosses. St Mary's church at Ottery St Mary has various well-preserved crosses. The Sacred Heart church at Bushey was consecrated in 1977 by Cardinal Hume, and contains twelve commemorative crosses which were donated by the local social club. The church of St Peter and St Paul at Ampton contains a painted cross. St Mary's Church, Shipton Solars, has medieval red-lead-painted crosses in the chancel and nave. Interior crosses can be seen at All Saints church at Kenton, St Mary, at Thornham Parva and St Peter at Great Livermere. St Peter's church at Creeting St Peter has exterior crosses. There is one consecration cross in the nave of Dunfermline Abbey.
