= Rupert Bear =

English children's comic strip

- Logo for Rupert Bear

Publication information
- Publisher: Daily Express
- Format: Text comics, later balloon comics too.
- Genre: Adventure comics, Fantasy comics
- Publication date: 1920; 106 years ago–present
- Main character: Rupert

Creative team
- Written by: Herbert Tourtel (1920–1931); Mary Tourtel (1931–1935); Alfred Bestall (1935–1974); Freddie Chaplain (1965–1978); James Henderson (1978–1990); Ian Robinson (1990–2002); Stuart Trotter (2008–present)
- Artist(s): Mary Tourtel (1920–1935); Alfred Bestall (1935–1974); Alex Cubie (1975–1977); John Harrold (1978–2007); Stuart Trotter (2008–present)

Rupert Bear, also known as Rupert the Bear or simply Rupert, is an English children's comic strip character and franchise created by Herbert Tourtel and illustrated by his wife, the artist Mary Tourtel, first appearing in the Daily Express newspaper on 8 November 1920. The initial purpose of the strip was to win sales from the rival Daily Mail and Daily Mirror. In 1935, the stories and artwork were both taken over by Alfred Bestall, previously an illustrator for Punch and other glossy magazines. Bestall proved successful in the field of children's literature and worked on Rupert stories and artwork into his nineties. Various other artists and writers have since continued the series. About 50 million copies have been sold worldwide.

The comic strip is published in the Daily Express, with many of the stories later appearing in books. A Rupert annual has been released since 1936. Rupert Bear is part of children's culture in the United Kingdom, and there are four television shows based on the character.

== Characters and story ==
Rupert is a bear who lives with his parents in a house in Nutwood, a fictional idyllic English village. He is drawn wearing a red jumper and bright yellow checked trousers, with matching yellow scarf. Originally depicted as a brown bear, his colour soon changed to white to save on printing costs, though he remained brown on the covers of the annuals.

Most of the other characters in the series are also anthropomorphic animals. They are all scaled to be about the same size as Rupert, regardless of species. Rupert's animal friends are usually referred to as his "chums" or "pals." Aside from his best friend Bill Badger, some of the most enduring pals are an elephant (Edward Trunk), a mouse (Willie), Pong-Ping the Pekingese, Algy Pug (who actually pre-dates Rupert), Podgy Pig, Bingo the Brainy Pup, the identical twins Freddy and Ferdy Fox, the identical twins Reggie and Rex Rabbit, and Ming the dragon. The kindly Wise Old Goat also lives in Nutwood, and helps Rupert in some of his adventures. One of the most unusual and evocative characters is Raggety, a woodland troll-creature made from twigs, who is often very grumpy and annoying. In the 2006 television revival of the series, Raggety has been transformed into a friendly elf with broken English. There is also a recurring country Police Officer who is an adult dog named PC Growler. There are also a few human characters in the stories, such as the Professor (who lives in a castle with his servant, Bodkin), Tiger Lily (a Chinese girl), her father "the Conjuror," and several less frequently occurring characters such as Sailor Sam, Gaffer Jarge, Captain Binnacle, the Sage of Um (who is seen travelling in a magical upside down umbrella) and Rollo, the Gypsy boy. There is also a recurring Merboy. During his time as Rupert writer, Alfred Bestall added further characters such as the girl guides Beryl, Pauline and Janet, with Beryl's cat, Dinky. These characters were based on Girl Guides from Bestall's own church who asked him in late 1947 if they could have their own adventure with Rupert. They remain part of the comic series even today.

The series often features fantastic and magical adventures in faraway lands. Each story begins in Nutwood, where Rupert usually sets out on a small errand for his mother or to visit a friend, which then develops into an adventure to an exotic place such as King Frost's Castle, the Kingdom of the Birds, underground, or to the bottom of the sea. Sometimes one of the Professor's inventions opens the door to one of Rupert's adventures. At the end of the story Rupert returns to Nutwood, where all is safe and well, and where his parents seem perfectly sanguine about his adventures.

== Style ==
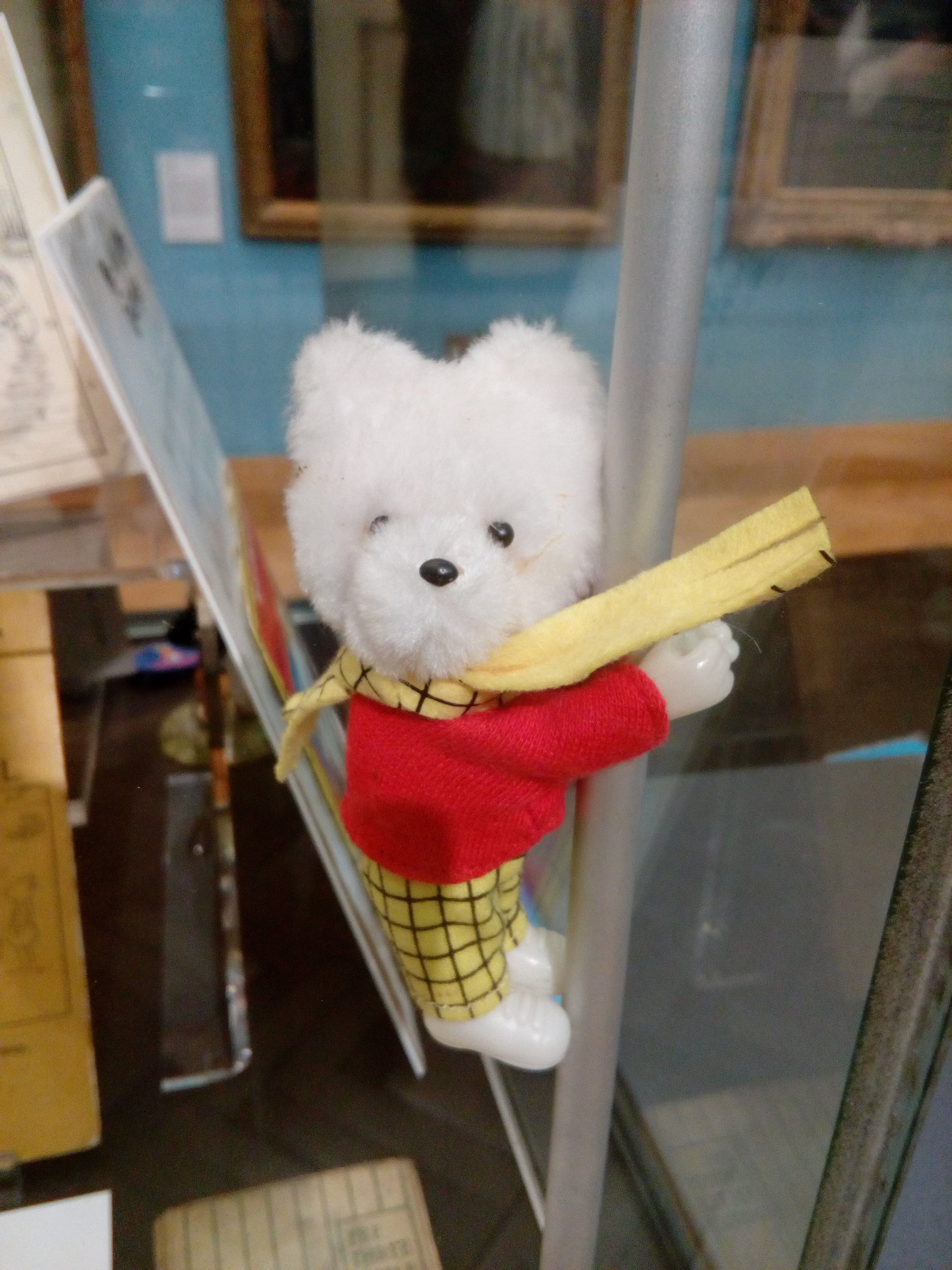
Rupert Bear is recognisable in his red jumper and yellow checked trousers and scarf

Unlike most modern comic strips, Rupert Bear has always been produced in the original form of strip with illustrations accompanying text, called "text comics", as opposed to text being incorporated directly into the art; for example, within speech balloons.

Bestall developed the classic Rupert story format: the story is told in picture form (generally two panels each day in the newspaper and four panels to a page in the annuals), in simple page-headers, in rhyming two-line-per-image verse, and as running prose at the foot. Rupert Annuals can therefore be "read" on four levels.

== History ==
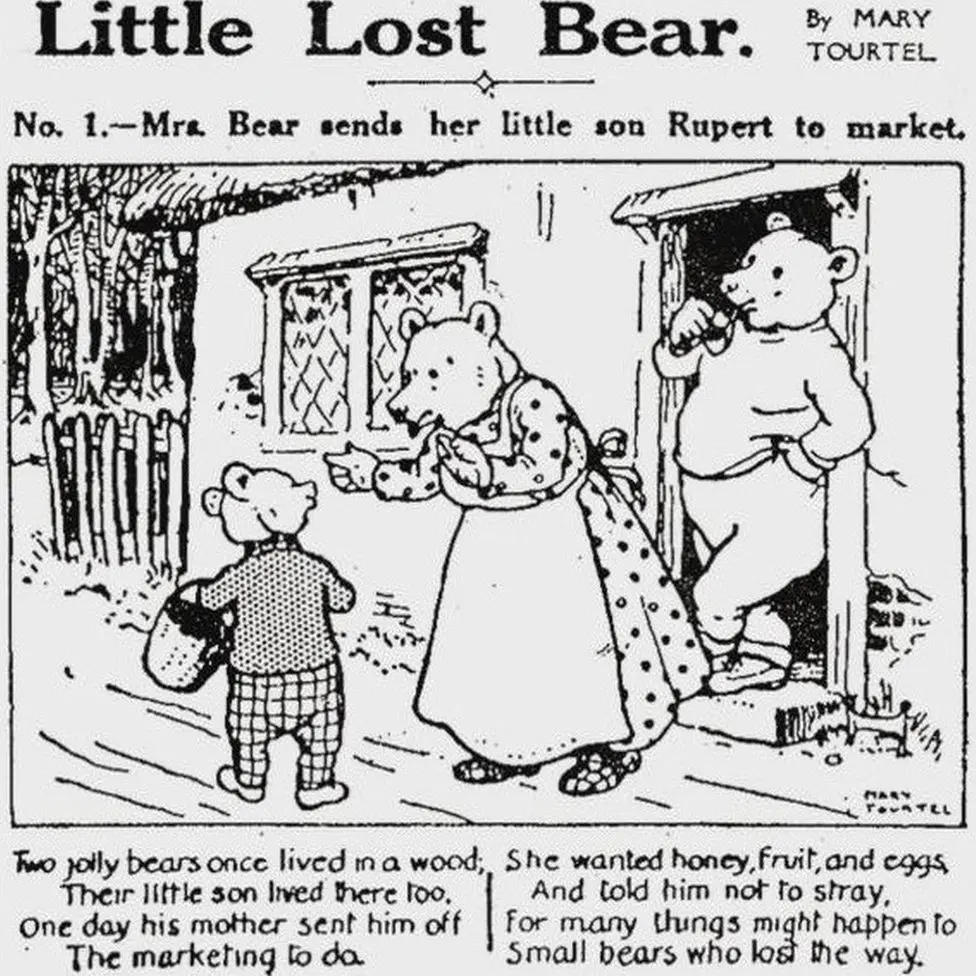
The first panel of "Little Lost Bear"

Rupert's unspectacular introduction was in a single panel, the first of 36 episodes of the story "Little Lost Bear" written by Herbert and drawn by Mary Tourtel.

Bestall expanded the stories and plots of Rupert, and in addition to precise and detailed drawings for the Daily Express panels he also created beautifully crafted illustrations in the Rupert Annuals. Bestall drew the Rupert stories for the Daily Express until 1965, and continued to illustrate the covers for the annuals until his retirement in 1973. Much of the landscape in Rupert is inspired by the Vale of Clwyd in North Wales (Alfred Bestall himself lived for many years in the north Welsh village of Beddgelert)(the Professor's castle is based on Ruthin Castle), the Sussex Weald and East Devon. Bestall's successor was Alex Cubie. Cubie created Rupert annual artwork between 1974 and 1977. His images are recognisable from the thicker black outlines around the characters and the use of more vibrant colours than Bestall employed. A Rupert Annual is still produced every year and Rupert appears each day in the Daily Express. In 1978, his new adventures became illustrated by John Harrold; his drawings in the annual were usually coloured by Gina Hart. In 2008 John Harrold was succeeded by Stuart Trotter and a new style of annual (sans serif typeface) with a more modern Rupert to tie-in with the CGI-animation Rupert Bear, Follow the Magic..., began.

The Rupert Annual for 1960 contained a story called Rupert and the Diamond Leaf, in which he visits "Coon Island", whose inhabitants are little "Coons". The Coons previously appeared on the cover of The New Rupert: The Daily Express Annual, 1954 and in the interior story Rupert and the Castaway. The first appearance was in the 1946 soft cover summer special Rupert on Coon Island.

Rupert appeared in Paul McCartney's 1984 music video "We All Stand Together"; McCartney also made an animated video starring Rupert called Rupert and the Frog Song. The short film, produced by McCartney won the British Academy Award.

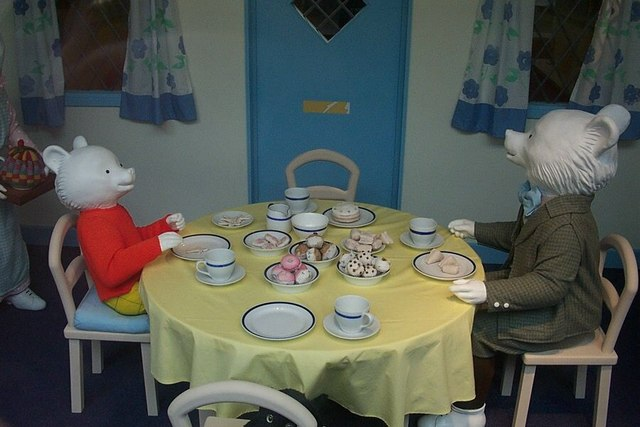
Rupert Bear exhibit formerly in the Canterbury Heritage Museum

Tourtel's home was in Canterbury in Kent, and the Rupert Bear Museum, formerly part of the Canterbury Heritage Museum, which has since closed, had collections that covered much of the history of Rupert and his friends, as well as Tourtel and other illustrators. The museum was geared toward families and those interested in the general history of Rupert.

In 1999, Rupert appeared in an advertisement for the NSPCC, where he is seen on a mug, covering his eyes over the sight of a psychopath bullying his child offscreen.

On 31 October 2005, UK Media Group Entertainment Rights (which was later bought by Boomerang Media, then DreamWorks Classics and now NBCUniversal) purchased a majority interest in the Rupert Bear character from the Daily Express.

== Books ==
=== Rupert Bear annuals ===
Every year since 1936, a Rupert Bear annual has been released, even during the years of World War II, during a paper shortage.

- 1–38 = Alfred Bestall
- 39–42 = Alex Cubie
- 43–72 = John Harrold
- 73–current = Stuart Trotter

1. The New Adventures of Rupert, 1936
2. More Adventures of Rupert, 1937
3. The New Rupert Book, 1938
4. The Adventures of Rupert, 1939
5. Rupert's Adventure Book, 1940
6. The Rupert Book, 1941
7. More Adventures of Rupert, 1942
8. More Rupert Adventures, 1943
9. Rupert in More Adventures, 1944
10. A New Rupert Book, 1945
11. The New Rupert Book, 1946
12. More Adventures of Rupert, 1947
13. The Rupert Book, 1948
14. Rupert, 1949
15. Adventures of Rupert, 1950
16. The New Rupert Book, 1951
17. More Rupert Adventures, 1952
18. More Adventures of Rupert, 1953
19. The New Rupert, 1954
20. Rupert, 1955
21. The Rupert Book, 1956
22. Rupert, 1957
23. Rupert, 1958
24. Rupert, 1959
25. Rupert, 1960
26. Rupert, 1961
27. Rupert, 1962
28. Rupert, 1963
29. Rupert, 1964
30. Rupert, 1965
31. Rupert, 1966
32. Rupert, 1967
33. Rupert, 1968
34. Rupert, 1969
35. Rupert, 1970
36. Rupert, 1971
37. Rupert, 1972
38. Rupert, 1973
39. Rupert, 1974
40. Rupert, 1975
41. Rupert, 1976
42. Rupert, 1977
43. Rupert, 1978
44. Rupert, 1979
45. Rupert, 1980

46. Rupert, 1981
47. Rupert, 1982
48. Rupert, 1983
49. Rupert, 1984
50. Rupert: The 50th Daily Express Annual, 1985
51. Rupert, 1986
52. Rupert, 1987
53. Rupert, 1988
54. Rupert, 1989
55. Rupert, 1990
56. Rupert, 1991
57. Rupert, 1992
58. Rupert, 1993
59. Rupert, 1994
60. The Rupert Annual: 75th Anniversary Edition, 1995
61. The Rupert Annual, 1996
62. The Rupert Annual, 1997
63. The Rupert Annual, 1998
64. The Rupert Annual, 1999
65. The Rupert Annual, 2000
66. The Rupert Annual, 2001
67. The Rupert Annual, 2002
68. The Rupert Annual, 2003
69. The Rupert Annual, 2004
70. The Rupert Annual, 2005
71. The Rupert Annual, 2006
72. The Rupert Annual, 2007
73. The Rupert Annual, 2008
74. The Rupert Annual, 2009
75. The 75th Rupert Annual, 2010
76. The Rupert Annual, 2011
77. The Rupert Annual, 2012
78. The Rupert Annual, 2013
79. The Rupert Annual, 2014
80. The 80th Rupert Annual, 2015
81. The Rupert Annual, 2016
82. The Rupert Annual, 2017
83. The Rupert Annual, 2018
84. The Rupert Annual, 2019
85. The Rupert Annual, 2020
86. The Rupert Annual, 2021
87. The Rupert Annual, 2022
88. The Rupert Annual, 2023
89. The Rupert Annual, 2024
90. The Rupert Annual, 2025
91. The 90th Rupert Annual, 2026

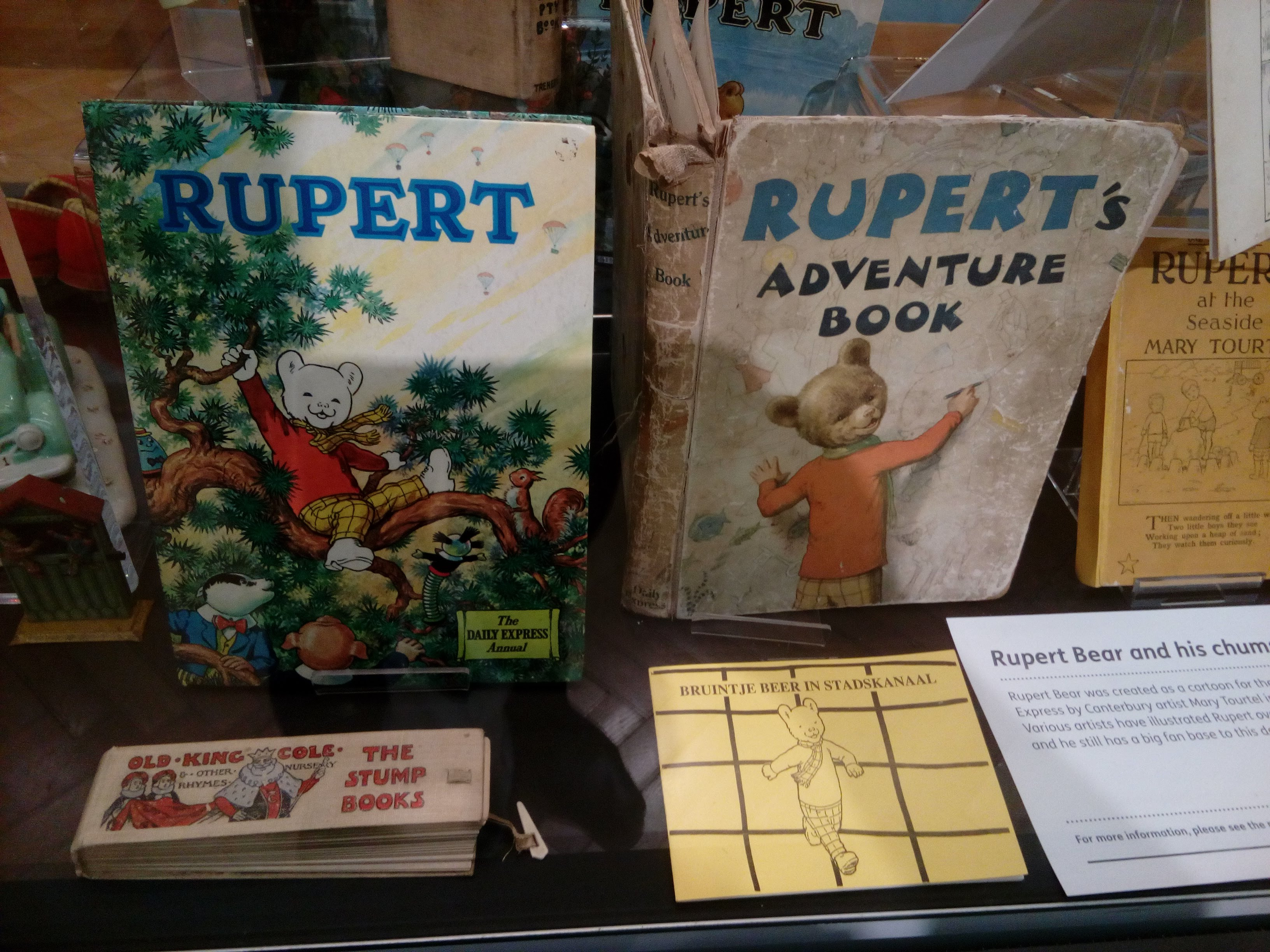
The 1940 (R) and 1973 (L) Rupert Annual.

=== Rupert Little Bear Library ===
All of these books were written and illustrated by Mary Tourtel and originally published from 1928 to 1936, by Sampson Low. There were 46 books in the original series.

1. Rupert and the Enchanted Princess (1928)
2. Rupert and the Black Dwarf (1928)
3. Rupert and his Pet Monkey (1928)
4. Rupert and his Friend Margot (and Rupert, Margot and the Fairies) (1928)
5. Rupert in the Mystery of Woody (1929)
6. Further Adventures of Rupert and his Friend Margot (and Rupert and the Stolen Apples) (1929)
7. Rupert and the Three Roberts (1929)
8. Rupert, the Knight and the Lady (and Rupert and the Wise Goat's Birthday Cake) (1929)
9. Rupert and the Circus Clown (1929)
10. Rupert and the Magic Hat (1929)
11. Rupert and the Little Prince (1930)
12. Rupert and King Pippin (1930)
13. Rupert and the Wilful Princess (1930)
14. Rupert's Mysterious Plight (1930)
15. Rupert in Trouble Again (and Rupert and the Fancy Dress Party) (1930)
16. Rupert and the Wooden Soldier (and Rupert's Christmas Adventure) (1930)
17. Rupert and the Old Man and the Sea (1931)
18. Rupert and Algy at Hawthorn Farm (1931)
19. Rupert and the Magic Whistle (1931)
20. Rupert Gets Stolen (1931)
21. Rupert and the Puss in Boots (1931)
22. Rupert and the Christmas Tree Fairies (and Rupert and Bill Badger's Picnic Party) (1931)
23. Rupert and His Pet Monkey Again (and Beppo Back With Rupert) (1932)
24. Rupert and the Rubber Wolf (1932)
25. Rupert's Latest Adventure (1932)
26. Rupert and Humpty Dumpty (1932)
27. Rupert's Holiday Adventure (and Rupert's Message to Father Christmas and Rupert's New Year's Eve Party) (1932)
28. Rupert's Christmas Tree (and Rupert's Picnic Party) (1932)
29. Rupert, the Witch and Tabitha (1933)
30. Rupert Goes Hiking (1933)
31. Rupert and Willy Wispe (1933)
32. Rupert Margot and the Bandits (and Rupert at School) (1933)
33. Rupert and the Magic Toyman (1933)
34. Rupert and Bill Keep Shop (and Rupert's Christmas Thrills) (1933)
35. Rupert and Algernon (and Rupert and the White Dove) (1934)
36. Rupert and Beppo Again (1934)
37. Rupert and Dapple (1934)
38. Rupert and Bill's Aeroplane Adventure (1934)
39. Rupert and the Magician's Umbrella (1934)
40. Rupert and Bill and the Pirates (1935)
41. Rupert at the Seaside (and Rupert and Bingo) (1935)
42. Rupert Gets Captured (and Rupert and the Snow Babe's Christmas Adventures) (1935)
43. Rupert, the Manikin and the Black Knight (1935)
44. Rupert and the Greedy Princess (1935)
45. Rupert and Bill's Seaside Holiday (and Rupert and the Twins' Birthday Cake) (1936)
46. Rupert and Edward and the Circus (and Rupert and the Snowman) (1936)

Some of the titles were later published for the Woolworth's retail chain, with only 18 of the original titles. However, the titles and numbers for this series did not relate to the earlier published series.

1. Rupert and the Magic Toy Man
2. Rupert at the Seaside
3. Rupert and the Enchanted Princess
4. Rupert and Edward at the Circus
5. Rupert and Bill and the Pirates
6. Rupert and the Magician's Umbrella
7. Rupert in the Wood of Mystery
8. Rupert and Prince Humpty Dumpty
9. Rupert and the Magic Whistle
10. Rupert and Dapple
11. Rupert and the Greedy Princess
12. Rupert and the Wonderful Boots
13. Rupert and Willy Wispe
14. Rupert and Bill Keep Shop
15. Rupert and the Magic Hat
16. Rupert's Holiday Adventure
17. Rupert Goes Hiking
18. Rupert, the Manikin and the Dark Knight

=== Brainwaves Limited ===
Brainwaves Limited of Basingstoke, Hampshire, produced a series of Rupert storybooks in 1991 (no author or artist credited):

- Rupert and the Golden Acorn
- Rupert and the Elfin Bell
- Rupert and the Popweed
- Rupert and the Iceberg

In addition, they published other Rupert series:

- Rupert Mini Board Books
- Rupert Hookbooks
- Rupert Storytime Books
- Rupert Shaped Board Books
- Rupert Flap Books

== Television series ==
=== The Adventures of Rupert Bear (1970–1977) ===
Rupert first appeared on television in an ITC series produced for the ITV network that ran for 156 ten-minute episodes. The characters were all puppets, although the opening sequence featured a toy Rupert bear sitting in a live-action child's bedroom. Rupert's friends and flying chariot appeared straight from the Daily Express pages, although he was joined by some new friends including Willy Wisp, Drizzle, Della, Jimmy, Mr Grimnasty, Gypsy Granny, Chun-Mao, The Wise Old Wizard, and Mr Koskora

The theme song, written by Len Beadle (also known as Frank Weston) and Ron Roker, sung by Jackie Lee, reached number 14 in the UK charts in 1971.

=== Rupert (1985–1988) ===
Rupert returned to television in 1985 to the BBC, in the form of 36 five-minute-stories. In this series, each episode consisted of a series of still illustrations and narration. The sole narrator was Ray Brooks. The short title music is credited to Brave New World. In the US, these shorts aired on the Disney Channel as part of its "Lunch Box" program.

=== Rupert (1991–1997) ===
In 1991, Rupert Bear featured in an animated television series with 65 episodes and five seasons (13 per season) produced by Nelvana (Canada), Ellipse (France) and Television South (TVS) for the first season (13 episodes), with Scottish TV taking over control from season 2 when Television South lost its ITV franchise. The show followed the style and tone Bestall established in the Rupert newspaper series, with many of the stories being almost direct adaptations of his or others' panel stories from the Daily Express.

It was aired in syndication on YTV in Canada. In the U.S., the show first aired on Nickelodeon (as part of the Nick Jr. block) before moving to CBS in January 1999. Repeats of the series later came to Disney Channel (as part of the Playhouse Disney block) from 2000 to 2001. From 2009 until the channel's closure in 2021, the show aired on Qubo, although only the latter 26 episodes were shown. The show was aired in the United Kingdom on CITV. In Australia, the show was aired on the ABC and on TV2 in New Zealand as part of the Jason Gunn show. The show has been returned in the United Kingdom on the satellite and cable network Tiny Pop. In South America, the show was aired in Brazil by the TV Cultura channel between 1998 and 2008.

In 2000, the Canadian producer Nelvana made plans to produce a feature film about Rupert at Hollywood studios, but the project was not implemented.

=== Rupert Bear, Follow The Magic... (2006–2008) ===
In 2006, a new Rupert Bear stop-motion-animated television series was produced, skewing almost entirely towards small children. Changes to the characters are that Rupert wears trainers and his fur has a slight tan; Bill wears a dark blue leather jacket and blue trousers with yellow stripes instead of his suit and bowtie, and tends to carry a personal digital assistant with him at all times; Pong Ping has become a girl who uses magic and had her name reversed; Raggety, who rarely appeared before, has become a friendly tree elf; Ming a baby dragon and Ping Pong's pet; Edward no longer has tusks, his trunk has been straightened and he wears an orange T-shirt and brown shorts; and one of the fox twins (Ferdie) has been changed into a girl named Freda. There are new characters like Miranda the mermaid; but characters Podgy Pig, his self-obsessed sister Rosalie and the timid Willie Mouse make no appearances.

Rupert Bear, Follow The Magic ... was first aired on Five from 8 November 2006 until 1 February 2008. 52 ten-minute episodes were broadcast and subsequently repeated.

== Film ==
A short film directed by Geoff Dunbar based on ideas/music/songs by Paul McCartney was made in 1984, titled Rupert and the Frog Song. It follows Rupert as he explores the country one night and finds a special gathering of frogs. The film contains a song titled "We All Stand Together", written by McCartney and arranged by the Beatles' producer George Martin. The song reached No.3 in the UK Singles Chart.

== Video games ==
The British video-game publisher Quicksilva adapted Rupert Bear for the Commodore 64 and ZX Spectrum 8-bit computers, in two game instalments: the 1985 Rupert and the Toymaker's Party and the 1986 Rupert and The Ice Castle.

== Stamps ==
In September 2020, Royal Mail issued a set of eight stamps to commemorate the centenary of Rupert Bear. Featuring Bestall's artwork, they comprised two second-class stamps, two first-class, two at £1.45 and two at £1.70.

== Oz magazine obscenity trial ==
A cartoon of Rupert superimposed on a Robert Crumb drawing, showing the bear in a sexual situation, was a notable part of the notorious edition of the British underground magazine Oz guest-edited by schoolkids. Subsequently, the adult editors and publishers of the magazine were prosecuted in a high-profile obscenity trial at the Old Bailey in June 1971; the inclusion of Rupert formed a part of the prosecution's case and defence witnesses were cross-examined on it.

== See also ==
- Koziołek Matołek

== Sources ==
- Daily Express, 1 November 2005
