= Barry Purves =

English animator, film director, and screenwriter

Barry J.C. Purves (born 28 August 1960) is an English animator, director and screenwriter of puppet animation television and cinema. He is also a theatre designer and director, primarily for the Altrincham Garrick Playhouse in Manchester.

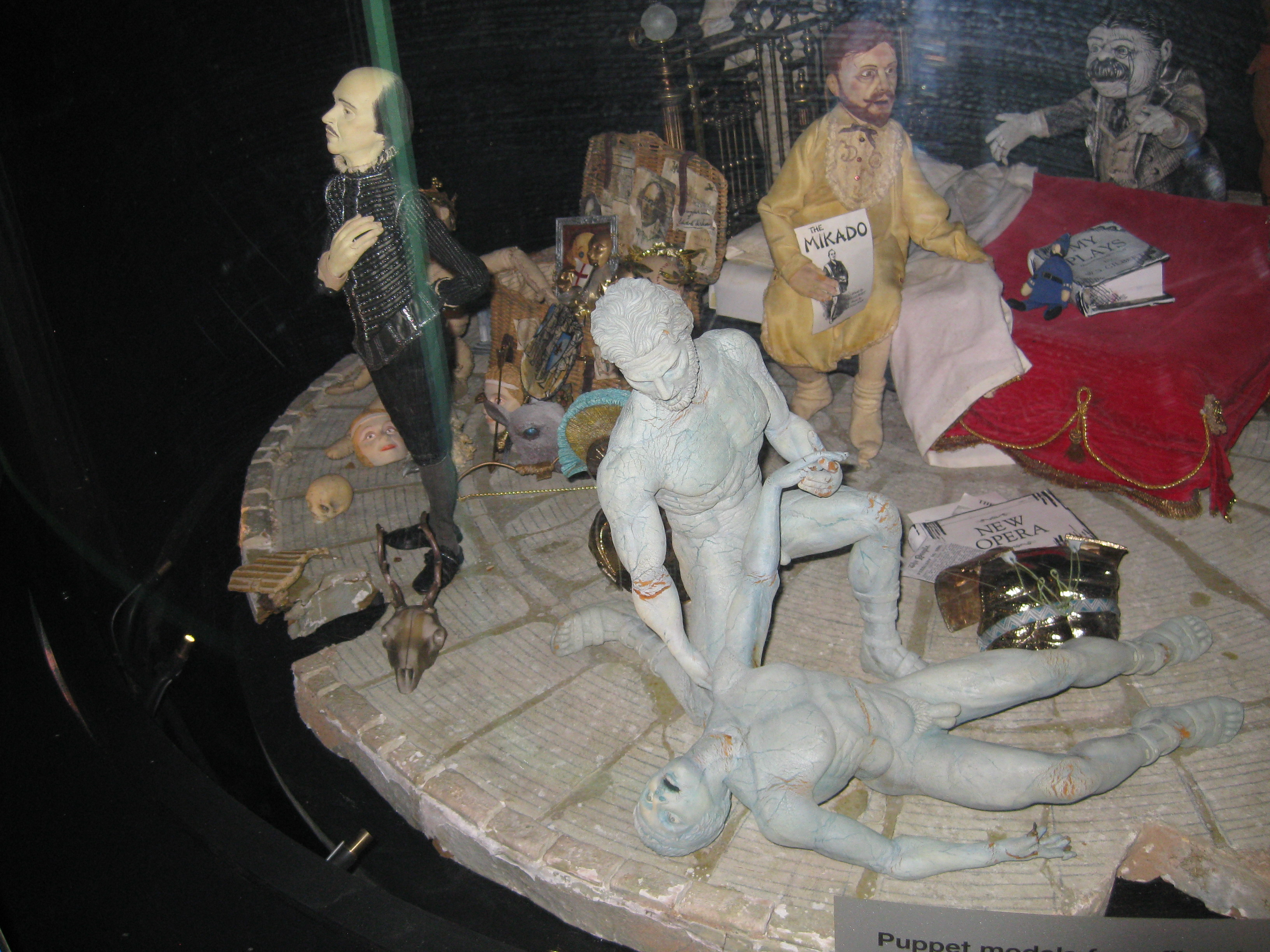
Models by Barry Purves including William Shakespeare (left), Achilles and Patroclus (front center), and Richard D'Oyly Carte and Arthur Sullivan (right back)

Purves has made six short films (see filmography below), each of which has been nominated for awards (including Academy Award and British Academy Film Awards nominations). He has also directed and animated for several television programmes and over seventy advertisements, title sequences and animated insert sequences. His film credits include being head animator for Tim Burton's Mars Attacks! (1996) (before the decision was made to use computer animation in place of stop motion), and serving as previsualisation animation director for Peter Jackson's King Kong (2005).

Purves' book Stop Motion: Passion, Process and Performance was released through Focal Press in 2007. Around 1996 he made plans to shoot a full-length film of Noye's Fludde, Benjamin Britten's opera version of a mystery play about the Deluge; he was also credited with co-presenting, in Mandarin, the live final of the Chinese talent search show Super Girl in 2006.

A selection of his films, and those with animation by Ray Harryhausen, the bolexbrothers, Suzie Templeton and others, were included alongside those of Kihachirō Kawamoto himself in the Watershed Media Centre season Kawamoto: The Puppet Master in 2008.

== Filmography ==
- Next: The Infinite Variety Show (1989), a farce inspired by Shakespeare's plays in which William Shakespeare himself attempts to impress the twentieth-century theatre director Peter Hall, with music by Stuart Gordon of The Korgis, John Sheaff and Will Gregory of Goldfrapp.
- Oh, Mr. Toad (1990), which was co-directed with Jackie Cockle and Chris Taylor.
- Screen Play (1992), which recounts the Willow pattern story(relocated to Japan) in the style of East Asian physical theatre such as kabuki and Bunraku, narrated simultaneously in British Sign Language and English.
- Rigoletto (1993), which is part of the Operavox series of half-hour animated versions of operas commissioned by S4C.
- Achilles (1995), which recounts the story of Achilles and Patroclus in a style inspired by the theatre and sculpture of ancient Greece.
- Gilbert & Sullivan: The Very Models (1998)
- Hamilton Mattress (2001)
- Rupert Bear, Follow the Magic... (2006)
- Plume (2011)
- Tchaikovsky (2011), an introduction to the composer's life and works.
- Toby's Travelling Circus (2012)
- No Ordinary Joe (2021), a hybrid of live-action and stop-motion and a fictionalized account of famous British powerboat racer and lesbian Joe Carstairs

== Availability ==
Screen Play is included on DVD-Video in British Animation Classics Volume One, published by the British Animation Awards.

A then-complete collection of Purves' short films, titled His Intimate Lives, is the first release from agnès b. DVD (a collaboration between the eponymous fashion designer and film producer with distributor Potemkine) and was released in France on 17 June 2008. The video presents each film at its intended aspect ratio but that of the widescreen Achilles, Gilbert and Sullivan and Hamilton Mattress is not anamorphic and, being released in 2008, the more recent Plume and Tchaikovsky are not included.
