= Mary Tourtel =

British artist (1874–1948)

- Born: Mary Caldwell; 28 January 1874 Canterbury, England
- Died: 15 March 1948 (aged 74) Canterbury, England
- Areas: Artist, writer
- Notable works: Rupert Bear

Mary Tourtel (born Mary Caldwell on 28 January 1874 – 15 March 1948) was a British artist and creator of the comic strip Rupert Bear. Her works have sold 50 million copies internationally.

== Early life ==
Mary Tourtel was born Mary Caldwell, 28 January 1874 at 52 Palace Street, Canterbury, Kent the youngest child of Sarah (née Scott) and Samuel Caldwell, a stained-glass artist and stonemason who restored stained glass for Canterbury Cathedral. The family were artistic and Mary studied art under Thomas Sidney Cooper at the Sidney Cooper School of Art in Canterbury (now the University for the Creative Arts), where she won the Prince of Wales scholarship.

== Career ==
Tourtel became a children's book illustrator, with her first published illustrations for children's books appearing in 1897. She married an assistant editor of The Daily Express, Herbert Bird Tourtel, at Stoke Poges on 26 September 1900. The couple travelled to Italy, Egypt, and India and took up flying, which influenced the viewpoints in some of Tourtel's illustrations.

== Rupert Bear ==
Rupert Bear was created in 1920, at a time when the Express was in competition with The Daily Mail and its then popular comic strip Teddy Tail, as well as the strip Pip, Squeak and Wilfred in The Daily Mirror. The then news editor of the Express, Herbert Tourtel, was approached with the task of producing a new comic strip to rival those of the Mail and Mirror and immediately thought of his wife Mary, already an established author and artist. Rupert Bear was the result and was first published as a nameless character in a strip titled Little Lost Bear on 8 November 1920.

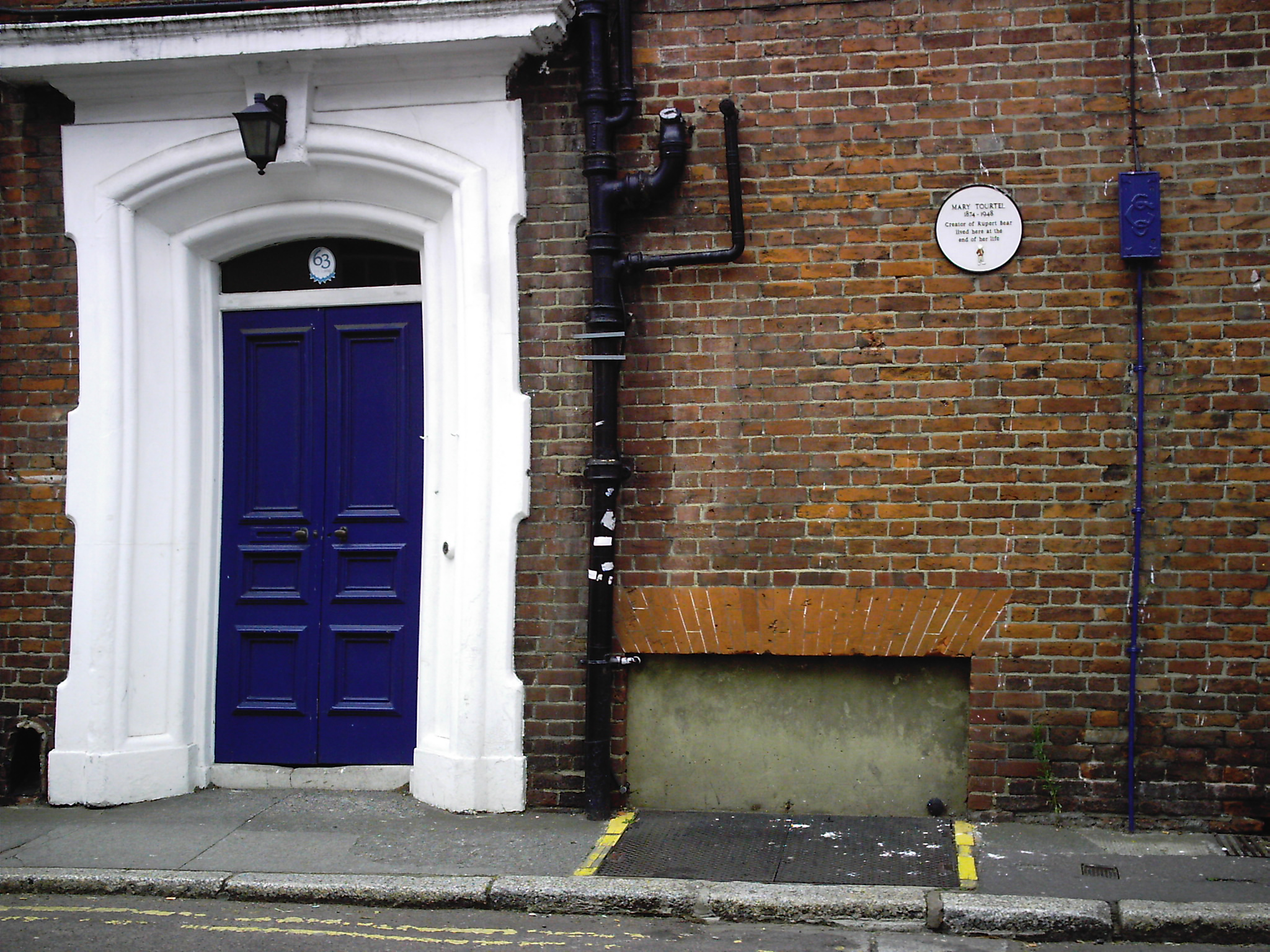
Plaque in Ivy Lane, Canterbury, marking the place where Tourtel spent her final years

The early strips were illustrated by Mary and captioned by her husband, often in poetry and were published as two cartoons a day with a short story underneath. Rupert was originally a brown bear until the Express cut inking expenses giving him his iconic and characteristic white colour. Mary's Rupert was more like a real bear, with a lumbering gait and more fur. The vibrant red and yellow clothing of contemporary Rupert was originally a soft blue jumper with grey trousers. Mary stopped drawing Rupert in 1935 when her eyesight started failing.

== Later life ==
In 1931 Herbert Tourtel died in a German sanatorium, and Mary retired four years later in 1935 after her eyesight and general health deteriorated. The Rupert Bear strips were continued by a Punch illustrator, Alfred Bestall. Mary lived most of her life in different hotels, never finding a fixed home as she preferred the freedom of travel. She died on 15 March 1948, aged 74, at the Kent and Canterbury Hospital, a week after she collapsed in Canterbury High Street from a brain tumour. She was buried with her husband at St Martin's Church, Canterbury; they had no children but travelled the world together.

== Commemoration ==
An Oxford Dictionary of National Biography was published on Tourtel in 2004.

In 2003, the Canterbury Heritage Museum, which closed in 2018, opened a special wing dedicated to Rupert Bear. There is now a Rupert display case in the Beaney House of Art and Knowledge, alongside the Clangers.

== Bibliography ==
=== Rupert series ===
The complete listing may be found at Rupert Little Bear Library.

=== Other books ===
- A Horse Book, Grant Richards, London, 1901 and F.A. Stokes Co., New York, 1901
- The Humpty Dumpty Book: Nursery Rhymes told in Pictures, Treherne, London, 1902
- The Three Little Foxes, Grant Richards, London, 1903
- Matchless A B C, Treherne, London, 1903
- The Strange Adventures of Billy Rabbit, M.A. Donohue & Co., 1908

=== As illustrator ===
- The Rabbit Book, by Bruce Rogers, M.A. Donohue & Co., Chicago, 1900

== See also ==
- Rupert Bear Museum

== Sources ==
- Mary Tourtel bio
