= Rupert and the Ice Castle =

1986 video game

- Commodore 64 box art
- Developer: Taskset
- Publisher: Bug-Byte
- Platforms: Commodore 64, ZX Spectrum
- Release: 1986
- Genre: Platform
- Mode: Single-player

Rupert and the Ice Castle is a platform game developed by Taskset and published by Bug-Byte in 1986 for the Commodore 64 and ZX Spectrum. It is based on Rupert Bear, a British cartoon and comics strip character created in 1920 by artist Mary Tourtel. The player, as Rupert Bear, attempts to rescue Rupert's friends Bingo, Edward Trunk, Algy, and Bill Badger whio have all been frozen by Jack Frost's evil sister, Jenny, while they were visiting Jack at the Ice Castle.

== Gameplay ==
Rupert has a number of magic ice pills which will revive his friends. He must find and give each of them an ice pill in order to set them back to their hometown Nutwood, but Jenny has set some traps for Rupert. Each time Rupert is hit by a toy he will lose one ice pill. If he is left with no pills he becomes frozen himself.

There are three levels of play and each scene within those levels presents Rupert with a different number of problems. In the third level Rupert will find warm clothes scattered around the Ice Castle, which will help him keep warm as he searches for his friends. The character can run, jump, duck to avoid snowballs and slide along ice patches.
