= Alfred Bestall =

British writer (1892–1986)

Alfred Bestall MBE
- Born: Alfred Edmeades Bestall; 14 December 1892; Mandalay, Burma, British India
- Died: 15 January 1986 (aged 93); Porthmadog, Wales
- Resting place: Brookwood Cemetery, Brookwood, Surrey, England
- Education: Birmingham School of Art, Central School of Art and Design
- Occupations: Writer; cartoonist; illustrator; origamist
- Known for: Rupert Bear
- Honours: Blue plaque

Alfred Edmeades "Fred" Bestall, MBE (14 December 1892 – 15 January 1986) was a British writer and illustrator for Rupert Bear for the London Daily Express, from 1935 to 1965.

== Biography ==
=== Early life ===
Bestall was born in Mandalay, Burma in 1892, where his parents were Methodist missionaries. He and his sister were sent back to England in 1897, and their parents joined them in 1910. As a schoolboy, he attended Rydal Mount school in Colwyn Bay from 1904 to 1911. He won a scholarship to the Birmingham Central School (later College) of Art and later attended the LCC Central School of Arts and Crafts in Camden. He served in World War I as an MT (motor transport) driver in the British Army in Flanders, where he transported troops, ammunition and stores in a range of vehicles including converted double-decker London B-Type buses, often under enemy fire.

=== Professional career ===
Following the war, Bestall finished his studies at the Central School of Art and was hired to illustrate books by Enid Blyton. He also began doing paintings for The Amalgamated Press and did illustrations for Punch and Tatler, as well as for over 50 books. In 1935, Bestall was selected to take over the Daily Express’s Rupert Bear stories from Mary Tourtel. Bestall said that he had known "nothing of the subject so I bought the Daily Express, looked at Mary Tourtel's work and drew three specimens keeping to her simplicity of line". Bestall did not sign his Rupert strips for the first 12 years out of respect to Tourtel. He had only five weeks to plan his first Rupert story and drawings. His first story was 'Rupert, Algy and the Smugglers' on 28 June 1935.

Bestall improved the stories and plots of Rupert, but more importantly, he created the most beautifully crafted illustrations in the Rupert annuals. Much of the landscape in Rupert is inspired by the Snowdonia landscape of North Wales, notably around Beddgelert. He had first visited Beddgelert whilst holidaying with his parents at Trefriw in the Conwy valley in 1912 and 1913, where their holiday home was called 'Penlan'. He was often asked where Rupert's home village of Nutwood was supposed to be located, and told his first biographer George Perry that 'it is an amalgam of the scenery in the Weald, the wooded plateau so loved by the poet Hilaire Belloc that lies in Kent and Sussex between the North and South Downs, and also of the Severn Valley around Hereford, with the more rugged terrain required in the stories reminiscent of the mountains of Snowdonia.'

The Daily Express Children's Editor had a single instruction for Bestall which was "no evil characters, fairies or magic". Tourtel had used magic in her Rupert plots, with her Rupert stories becoming more macabre after the death of her husband.

During World War II he served as an air raid warden in Surbiton, Surrey. His 1941 oil painting of Air-Raid Post M4 on Surbiton Hill, under snow, was exhibited at the Royal Academy, 'one of his proudest achievements.' Despite the suburban setting on the fringe of London, the area was hit by enemy bombing during the Blitz, houses were destroyed and families were 'bombed out'. In 1947, three girls from the 10th Surbiton Guides visited Bestall at home, and begged to be included in a Rupert cartoon, which they were. Bestall produced his last Rupert story on 22 July 1965. He retired from the Daily Express in July 1965 but continued creating covers and endpapers for the annuals until 1973. Bestall also drew illustrations for the Whitcombe's Story Book, a form of children's reader published in Australasia by Whitcombe & Tombs Ltd. These books were undated; but Bestall's work appears in the 500 numbers, possibly published in the 1950s.

=== Personal life ===
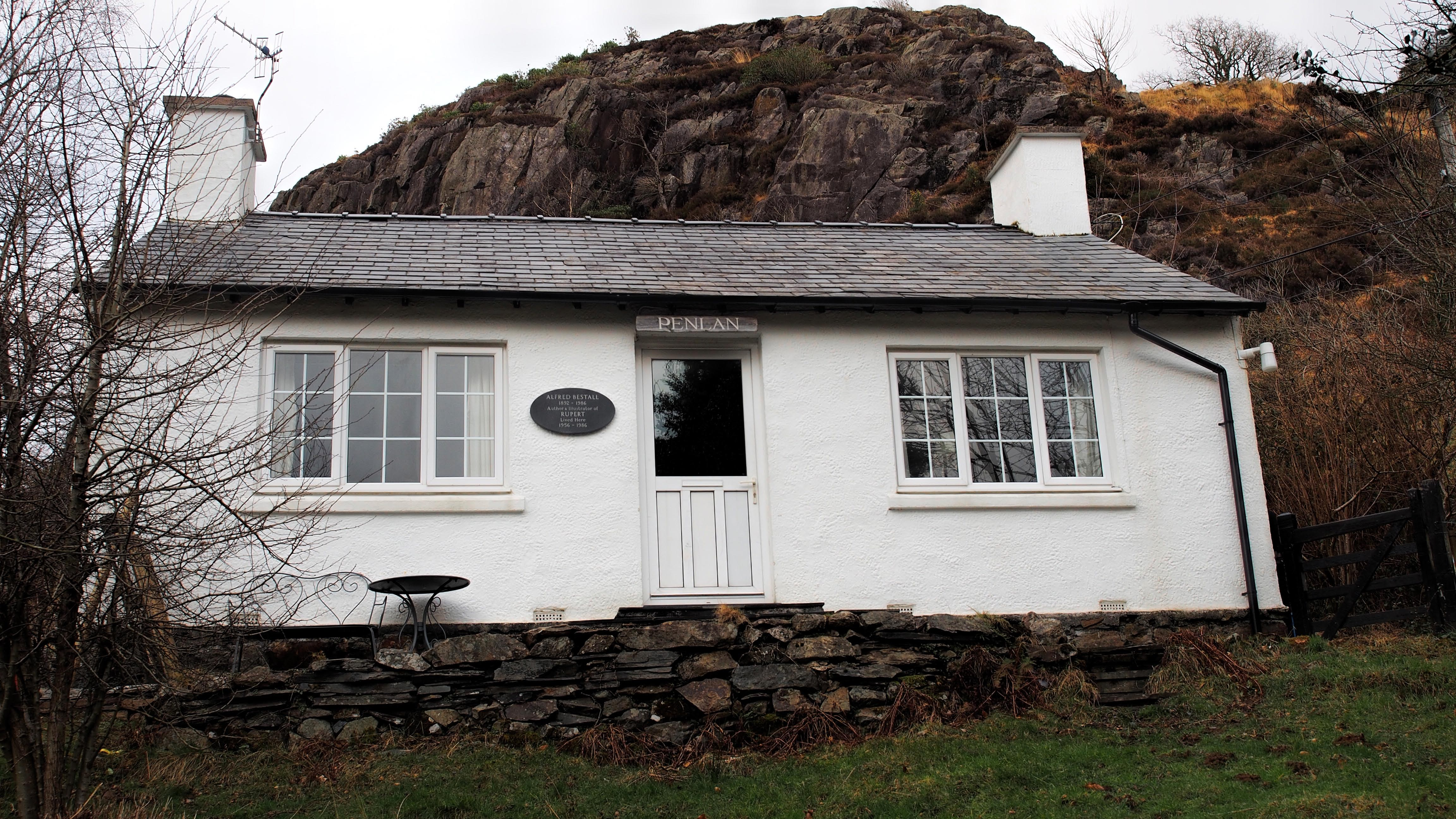
Bestall's cottage in Beddgelert

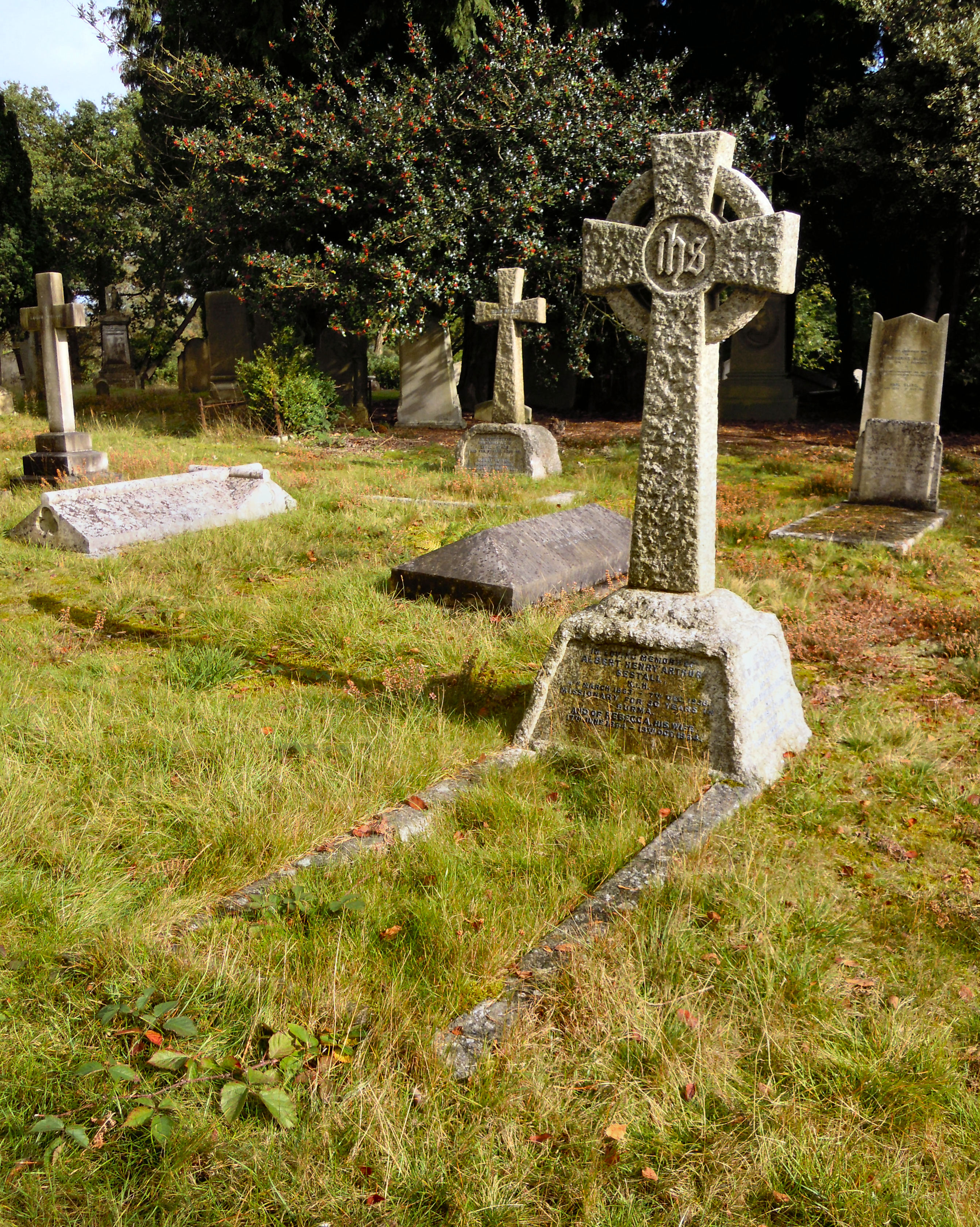
Bestall's grave in Brookwood Cemetery

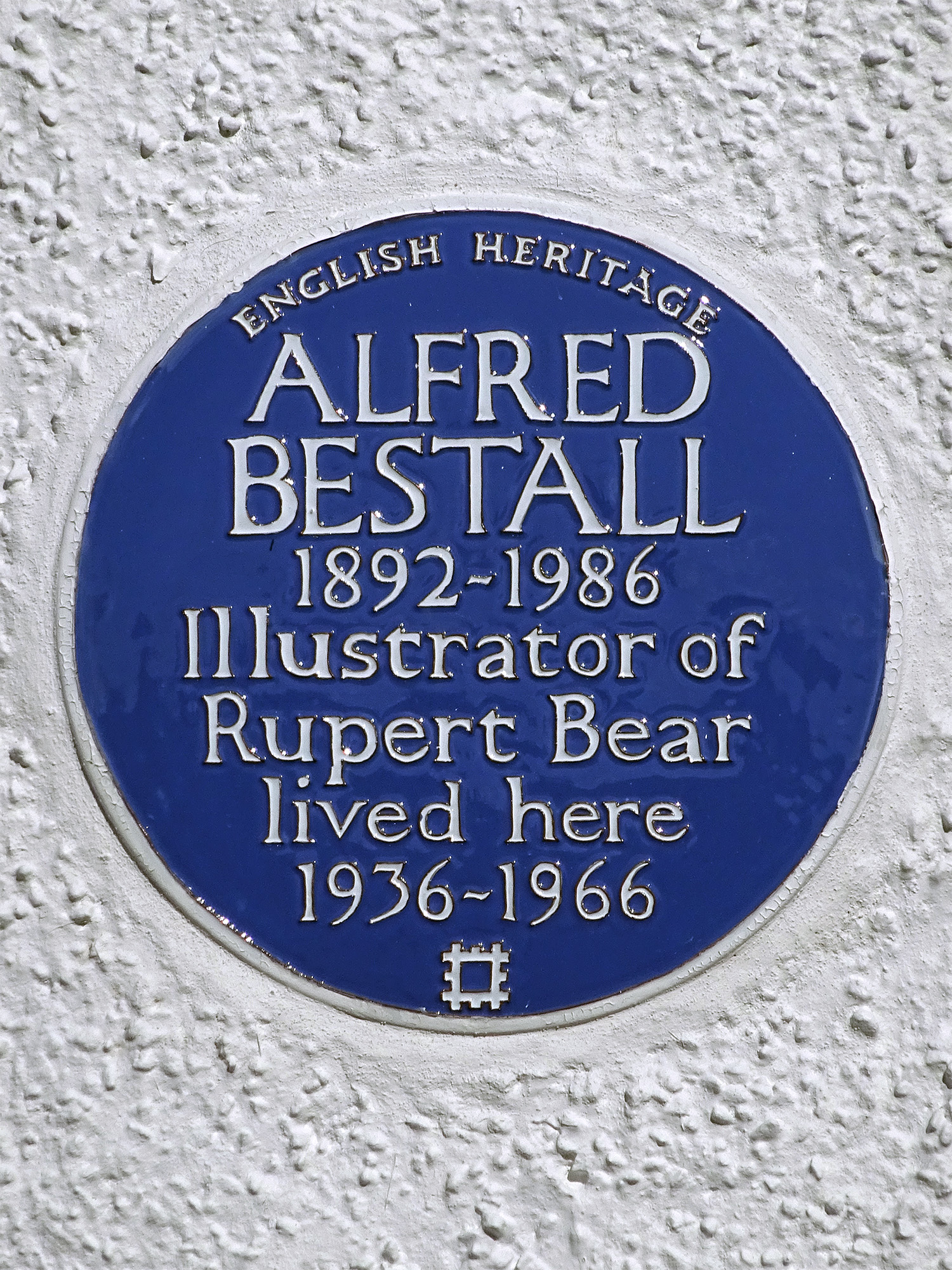
58 Cranes Park, Surbiton KT5 8AS

During the mid-1930s, Bestall courted Miss Beatrice Nicholson, a fellow member of his Methodist church in Surbiton, painting her portrait, playing tennis and badminton with her and attending dances, plays, films and concerts with her, but relations were severed for some years from June 1936, on a day marked simply with an 'X' in his diary, presumably representing a rejected proposal of marriage. Until 1937, he had a severe speech impediment, a 'persistent stutter' caused by a spinal injury at an early age in Burma, making him 'desperately shy and withdrawn.' His parents would never tell him the cause of the accident, which he was too young to remember, but he believed it might have been a fall from a pony. However, at the age of 45, 'I went to see a famous osteopath, who told me to sit down. He then went behind me, and gave me a fearful jerk, I felt something click, and after more than forty years I was cured!' In 1947, his diary recorded that he and his mother 'went to tea with Beatty Cole (Nicholson).' Asked by the Surrey Comet in 1970, on the occasion of Rupert's half-centenary, if he regretted not having children of his own, he said, reflecting on his countless young readers, 'Not really... I feel as if I've had thousands of them.'

Although living in Surbiton after World War II, he regularly holidayed in Nantgwynant, near Beddgelert. While at Beddgelert, he stayed at a small mountain cottage named 'Hendre' renovated by and on the land above the Glaslyn river, owned by Lt Col. Sydney Goodchild. Goodchild designed the cottage that in 1956 Alfred bought at the foot of Mynydd Sygun, in Beddgelert, which he subsequently named 'Penlan'.Many of his illustrations of that period are views from that mountain cottage adjacent to Plas Oerddwr. The cottage, with 'one of the finest views in Britain', 'looking out across a broad valley and the fast-flowing River Glaslyn, and proud mountains beyond,' became his permanent home from September 1980, but he still returned to Surbiton several times a year. Bestall kept all his early artwork in the loft of Penlan and told his goddaughter to have a bonfire of his work after his death. Bestall had featured origami in almost every Rupert Annual from 1946 onwards (the first model, predictably, was the "Flapping Bird") and thus was partially responsible for the growth of interest in origami in the UK. After the formation of the British Origami Society in 1967, Bestall took an active interest, attending conventions and serving as its president for many years, until his death.

He was appointed a Member of the Order of the British Empire (MBE) in the 1985 Birthday Honours but was unable to receive the award in person because he had bone cancer. On his 93rd birthday, Prince Charles sent him a telemessage, which read: "I have heard that you were sadly unable to receive your MBE from the Queen recently. I wanted to send you my congratulations on your award and to wish you a very happy birthday with many happy returns. As a child I well remember your marvellous illustrations of Rupert Bear." In May 2006, Bestall was commemorated with an English Heritage blue plaque at 58 Cranes Park, Surbiton, London, where he lived for 30 years. He also lived in Beaconsfield House, 44 Ewell Road, Surbiton, from 1966 to 1977.

Bestall died on 15 January 1986, aged 93, at Wern Manor Nursing Home in Porthmadog, Wales. He is buried in plot 100 of Brookwood Cemetery.
