= Canterbury cross =

Variant of the Christian cross

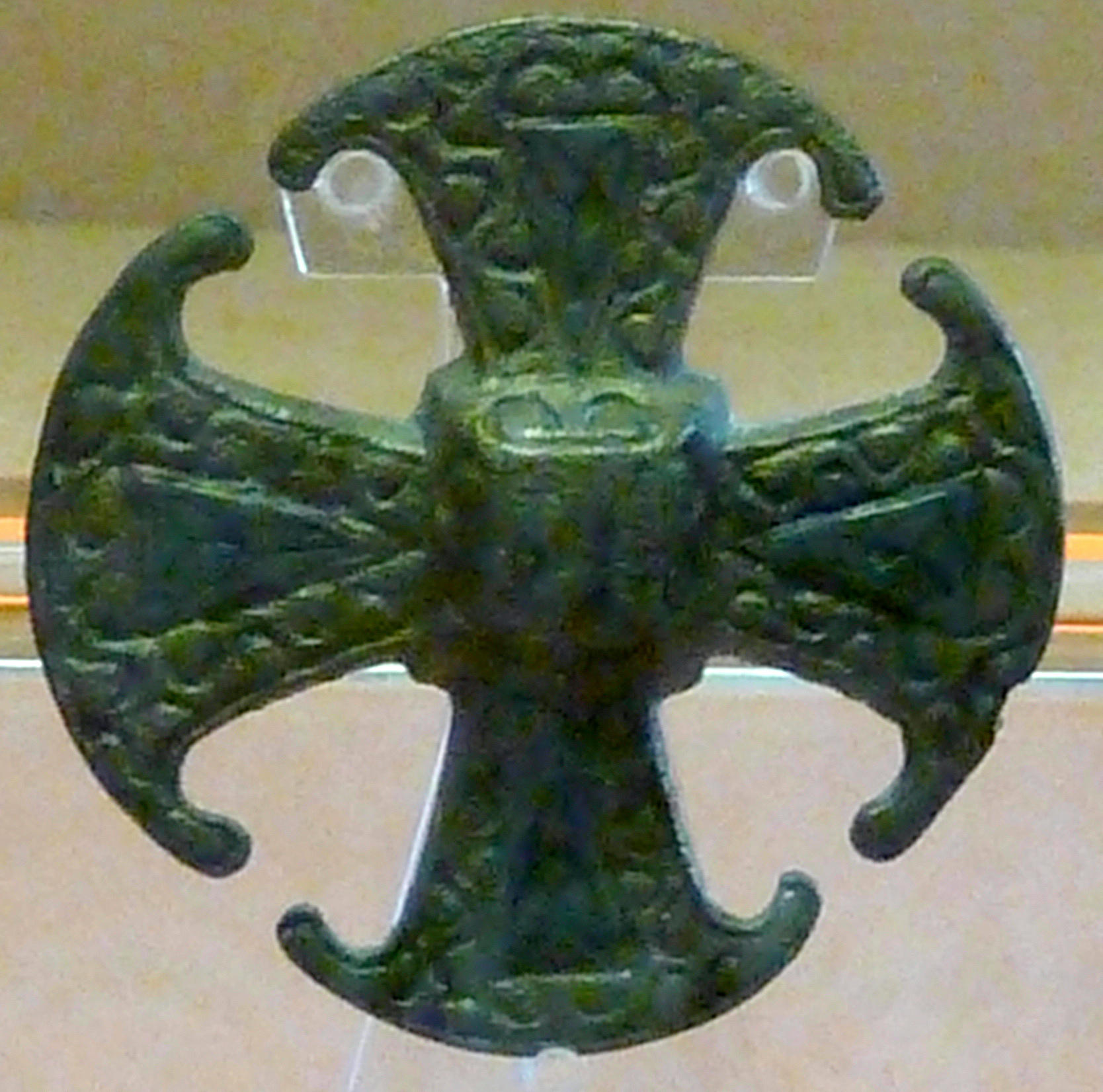
The original Canterbury Cross

A Canterbury Cross design

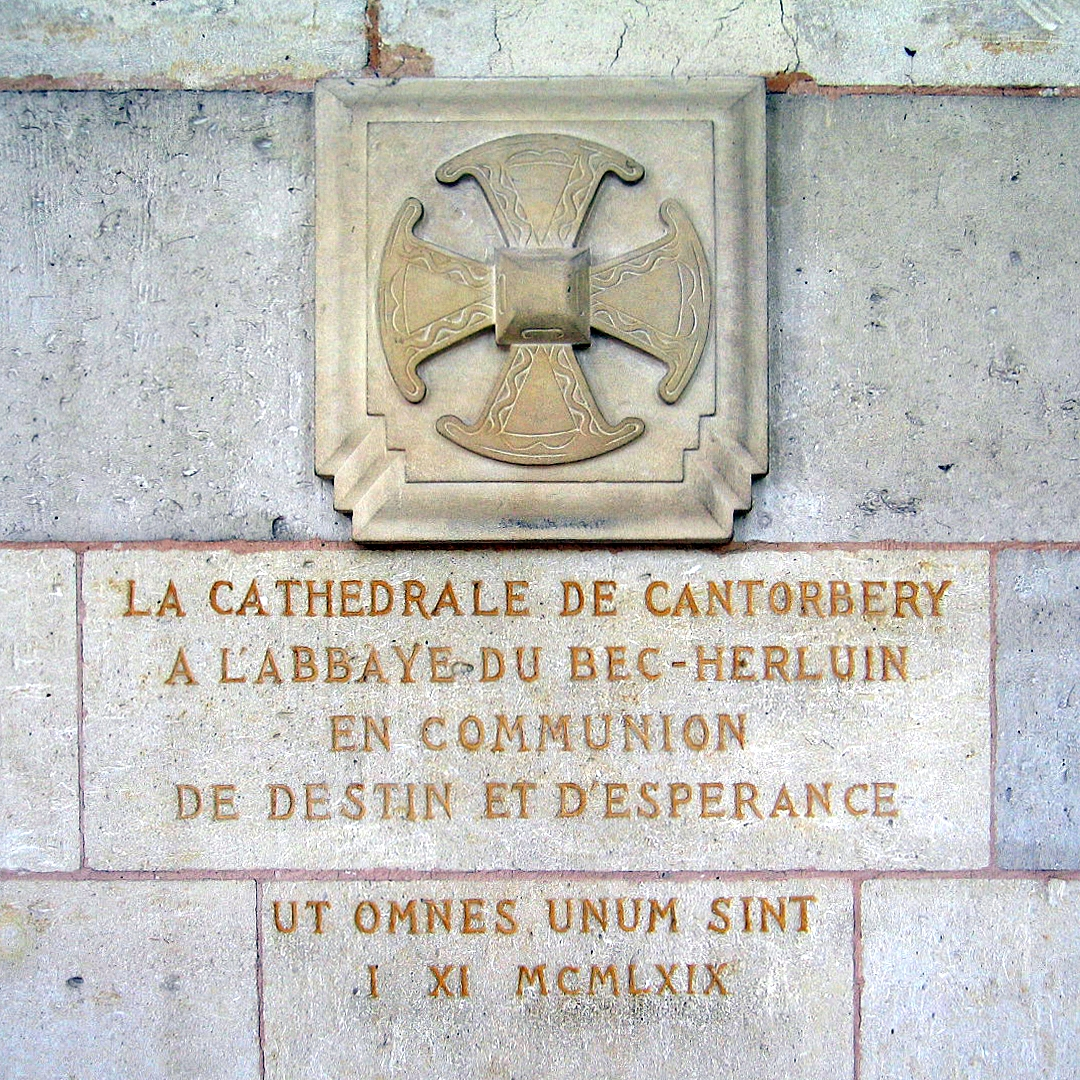
A stone Canterbury Cross at Bec Abbey in Normandy, donated by Canterbury Cathedral in 1969

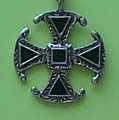
A Canterbury Cross brooch

The Canterbury Cross is one of the crosses that are used to symbolise the Christian faith. It is so called because it was designed after an Anglo-Saxon brooch, dating c. 850 that was found in 1867 in Canterbury, England.

== General ==
The original cross, kept at the Beaney House of Art and Knowledge in Canterbury, is a bronze cruciform brooch, with triangular panels of silver, incised with a triquetra and inlaid with niello. This cross features a small square in the centre, from which extend four arms, wider on the outside, so that the arms look like triangles, symbolising the Trinity. The tips of the arms are arcs of a single circle, giving the overall effect of a round wheel.

As a stone cross is erected at Canterbury Cathedral and the crosses are sold at the souvenir shop there, the Canterbury Cross is familiar to those who made pilgrimage there. It is sometimes used as a symbol to represent the Anglican Communion. For example, in 1932, a Canterbury Cross made up of pieces of stone from Canterbury was sent to each of the Anglican diocesan cathedrals around the world as a visible symbol of communion with Canterbury.

The cross is also used as the logo of the Anglicanorum Coetibus Society, which supports Personal ordinariates for converts from Anglicanism to the Catholic Church.

== See also ==
- Anglican Communion
