= Canterbury Archaeological Trust =

UK charity

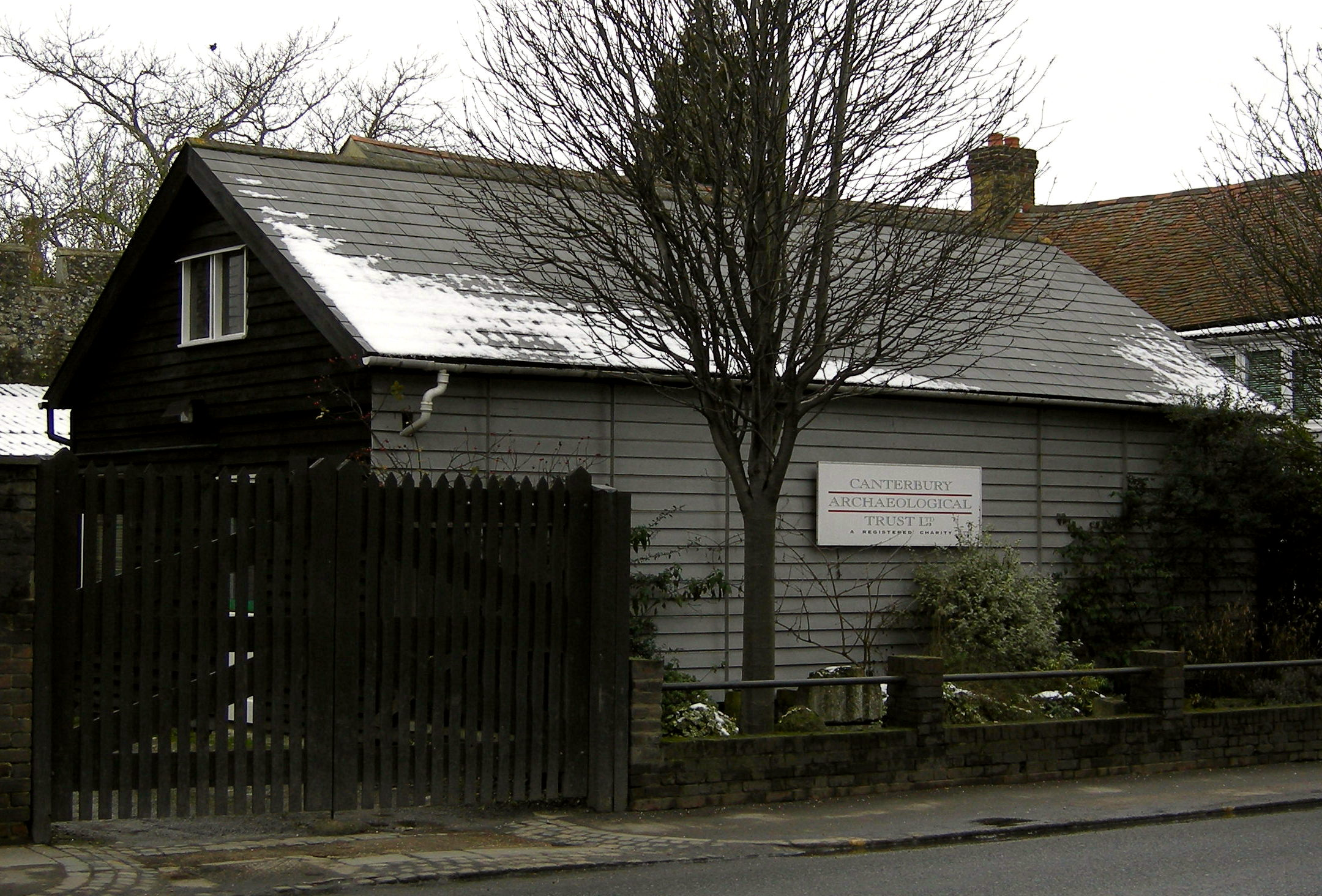
CAT headquarters building in Canterbury

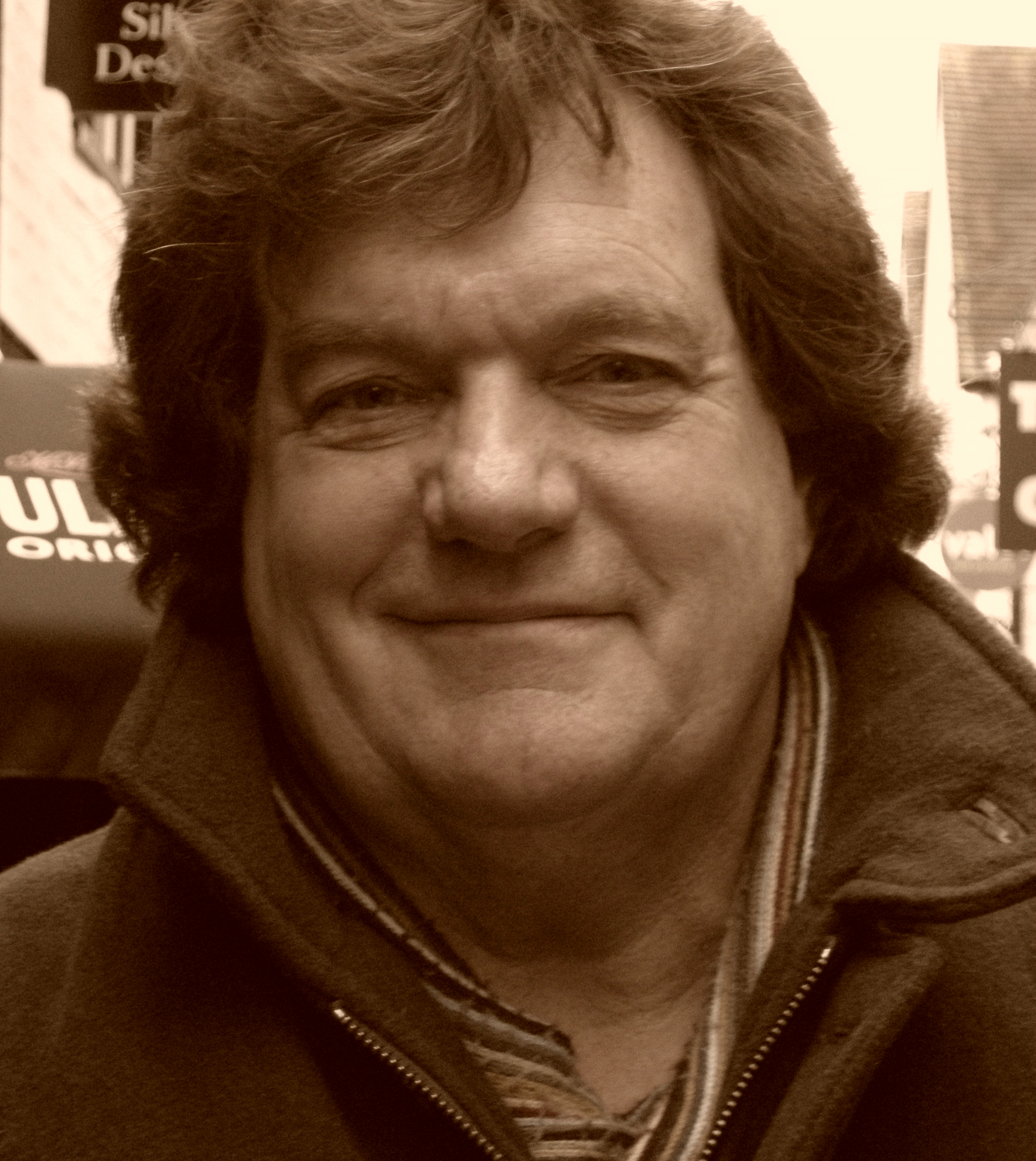
Dr Paul Bennett, archaeologist and former director of CAT

Canterbury Archaeological Trust (CAT) is an independent charity formed in 1975 to undertake rescue excavation, research, publication and the presentation of the results of its work for the benefit of the public.

The Trust's main activities are to:

- carry out archaeological excavations in Canterbury, its district and the county of Kent.
- record standing buildings.
- manage the Archaeology in Education Service (AES) for Kent schools and colleges.
- publish reports of the Trust's investigations, both popular and academic.
- provide planning advice for archaeology to Canterbury City Council
- act as the Investigating Authority for the Canterbury Area of Archaeological Importance.

The Trust's base of operations is at 92A Broad Street, Canterbury. This is where the administrative offices are located and the finds department and post-excavation offices. The Trust's library, which includes the collection of the Canterbury Archaeological Society, is open by appointment to students and members of the public.

The work of the Trust is supported by the Friends of the Canterbury Archaeological Trust (FCAT).

== Staff ==
- Director: Mark Houliston
