= The Seal of Neptune =

- Created by: Oliver Postgate; Peter Firmin
- Narrated by: Oliver Postgate
- Country of origin: United Kingdom
- No. of episodes: 12

Production
- Running time: 10 minutes per episode

Original release
- Network: BBC
- Release: 1960, 1962

The Seal of Neptune is an animated children's programme created by Oliver Postgate and Peter Firmin, also known for their works Ivor the Engine and Clangers. It was broadcast on BBC Television in 1960. Its plot featured the adventures of a seahorse and a shrimp and was similar in animation style to Ivor the Engine and Noggin the Nog.

It was followed in 1962 by a sequel called The Mermaid's Pearls.

In 2014, The Seal of Neptune and The Mermaid's Pearls (1963) were released on DVD by the Dragons' Friendly Society.

== Episodes ==
The Seal of Neptune:

1. The Discovery (The Wreck in the Radio Times)
2. The Sharks
3. The Mermaid
4. The White Sailed Ship
5. The City
6. Neptune

The Mermaid's Pearls:

1. The Mermaid
2. The Wreck
3. The Search
4. The Sad Stones
5. The City
6. Neptune

== Broadcast ==
The Seal of Neptune first broadcast: 6 July 1960 - 10 August 1960

The Seal of Neptune second broadcast: 28 July 1961 - 1 September 1961

The Mermaid's Pearls first broadcast: 15 August 1962 - 19 September 1962†

The Mermaid's Pearls second broadcast: 13 June 1963 - 18 July 1963

† Episode 6 of The Mermaid's Pearls on 19 September 1962 was broadcast as part of BBC's Picture Time programming block
