= Vernon Elliott =

British musician (1912–1996)

Vernon Pelling Elliott (27 July 1912 – 12 October 1996) was a British bassoonist, conductor and composer. He was an influential teacher of the bassoon for over 40 years. From the 1960s he became more widely known as the composer of music for short animated television films for children, including the Ivor the Engine series (1959-1977).

== Education and war service ==
Born in Croydon into a musical family, Elliott took up the bassoon at a very early age. He attended Selhurst Grammar School and worked in an office for a while, before obtaining a scholarship to the Royal College of Music where he won the Edwin James Woodwind Prize. However, he left before graduating in order to take up the full-time position as principal bassoonist with the Bournemouth Municipal Orchestra in 1937. He also began playing with Sadler's Wells Opera in 1938. During the war he served in the Irish Guards, playing in the band.

== Musical career ==
From then on he had an eventful, busy and very musical life, one which saw him as a founder member of Walter Legge's Philharmonia Orchestra in 1945, a regular player at English National Opera and (from 1949) the Royal Opera House, and a member of Benjamin Britten's English Opera Group orchestra, performing in the first performances of Peter Grimes (1945) and The Turn of the Screw (1954). When Legge disbanded the Philharmonia in 1964, Elliott (with his colleague Gwydion Brooke and others), reformed themselves as the New Philharmonia.

He conducted the Royal Philharmonic Orchestra and was a regular conductor of amateur and local orchestras, including the Wembley Symphony Orchestra which he founded in 1950. He also conducted the Pro Arte Orchestra, the Capriol Orchestra and later the Cambridge Symphony Orchestra.

Elliot was an influential teacher of the bassoon for over 40 years, first at the Royal College of Music and later at Trinity College of Music, London. His pupils included Michael Chapman and William Waterhouse. He also took on session work with the dance bandleader Geraldo and the Rolling Stones.

== Smallfilms music ==
In 1959, through his friendship with Steve Race (then acting as an advisor to Associated-Rediffusion), he was asked to help Oliver Postgate by writing a bassoon theme for Ivor the Engine. He went on to compose the highly evocative music to the Smallfilms productions of Noggin the Nog, The Seal of Neptune, Pogles' Wood, Pingwings and Clangers. A compilation album of his work for Clangers was released in 2001 and an album of his music for Ivor the Engine and Pogles' Wood followed in 2007. Bob Stanley described the music as "playful, but extraordinarily melancholy...led by Elliott's bassoon with support from woodwind, piano and the odd choir".

== Personal life ==
In 1937 Elliott married Nora Mukle, a double bass player, orchestral fixer and founder member of the New London Orchestra. There were two daughters: Naomi (a cellist) and Bridget (an artist). In the late 1930s they were living at 181 Sudbury Heights Avenue, Greenford. In the 1950s they moved to 3 Maxted Park, Harrow. Nora died in 1993. Vernon Elliott was a keen sailor (keeping a boat moored at Aldeburgh during festivals), horse rider, skier and bee-keeper. He died in October 1996, aged 84.
