= Faith Eaton =

British doll collector (1927–2005)

Faith Eaton (1927 - 2005) was a major British doll and dolls' house collector, who published widely on the history, manufacture and care of toys. She was a very early member of the Doll Club of Great Britain, founder member The Dolls' House Society and the Dollmakers Circle. Part of her archive is held at the V&A Museum of Childhood in London.

== Life ==
Faith Sybil Eaton was born on 9 January 1927. The family lived at 16 Clifton Gardens, in Maida Vale, West London where Faith remained for most of her life, and which she referred to as her "study centre".

Eaton trained as an occupational therapist.

Although she had dolls' houses as a child, her serious interest began when she was in her early twenties. She recalled "the momentous event", around 1950, she found three of her mother's old dolls in a "seldom opened cupboard". Eaton's interest in repairing dolls was sparked around the same time, when in the 1950s, she was helping to organise a charity exhibition of dolls, and when one of the exhibits was damaged, she managed to repair it.

Her collection included doll making in all materials, with international scope. She collected items relating to domestic and social history, including wallpapers, kitchenalia, textiles and costume.

In 1959, Eaton was the Exhibition Designer of Dolls Through the Ages, a charity fundraising exhibition held at the Ceylon Tea Centre, Regent Street, London.

In 1962 she took part in Toys, an exhibition with The British Toymakers Guild.

In 1983, Eaton had a cameo appearance in Smallfilms's television series Tottie: Story of a Dolls House. This adaptation of Rumer Godden's book had human characters as still images, and Faith appeared as the Queen on a visit to a doll exhibition.

In 1990, her collection was shown at Sledmere House, in Yorkshire, in the exhibition Treasure of Childhood.

Eaton was involved in the conservation and display of France and Marianne, two dolls given to British Princesses Elizabeth and Margaret by the children of France in 1938. Faith's work followed the fire at Windsor Castle, and resulted in the publication Dolls for the Princesses.

Upon Eaton's death in 2005, her house in Maida Vale was bequeathed to the Eaton Fund, a charity named after her cousin Nellie Eaton.

== Publications ==
- Dolls in Colour (Blandford Press, 1975)
- Care and Repair of Antique and Modern Dolls (Batsford Ltd, 1985)
- The Miniature House (Weidenfeld & Nicolson, 1990)
- Classic Dolls' Houses (George Weidenfeld & Nicolson Ltd, 1990)
- The Ultimate Dolls' Book (Dorling Kindersley, 1993) with Caroline Goodfellow
- The Ultimate Dolls' House Book (Dorling Kindersley Publishers Ltd, 1994)
- Dolls For The Princesses: The Story of France and Marianne (London: The Royal Collection, 2002) with Suzy Menkes
