= Pingwings =

Children's television series

Pingwings is an animated black and white children's television series, comprising 18 ten-minute episodes, broadcast in the United Kingdom on ITV in three series of six programmes each, between 1961 and 1965. It first aired on Associated Rediffusion in February 1961. Created by Oliver Postgate and Peter Firmin of Smallfilms, it starred a family of penguin-like creatures (the word "Pingwing" is a pun on the word "penguin") who lived at the back of a barn on the fictional Berrydown Farm. The characters were knitted by Firmin's sister Gloria Wilson, and the animation was achieved using the stop motion technique.

Some of the animated sequences were filmed in the open air. Such sequences were often intercut with live-action sequences, featuring Mr and Mrs Farmer and Gay the Goat. In this way the Pingwing family interacted with their neighbours on the farm. The series was in fact filmed partly "on location": since Peter Firmin and his wife lived in an old farmhouse, and the Smallfilms film studio was located in a disused barn adjacent to it, all the exteriors needed for the series were available literally on their doorstep.

The series was captured on 16mm black-and-white film. All of the voices were provided by Oliver Postgate and Olwen Griffiths.

A short sequence of Pingwings is available on the CD accompanying Oliver Postgate's autobiography, and a DVD of the 18 episodes is also available, from the Dragons' Friendly Society.

The music for the series was composed by Vernon Elliot, and performed by him with the oboist Sidney Sutcliffe.

== Characters ==
Mr Pingwing

The father figure, portrayed as less than bright but loves his family.

Mrs Pingwing

The archetypal mother figure, she wears an apron.

Paul Pingwing

The eldest child, and technically minded and overconfident, he wears a hat.

Penny Pingwing

Paul's younger sister, she wears an apron.

Baby Pingwing

Egg laid in episode one and hatched in episode four, he frequently gets into trouble.

The Pog

A strange, wise pig-like creature that Mr. Pingwing often asks for advice in later episodes.

Gay the Goat

Gay has a large role in episode two and remains a background character elsewhere. She is deaf and kindly and a live action character.

== Broadcasts ==
Series One

Episode 1: "The Happy Event"
Episode 2: "The Ice Cream Tree"
Episode 3: "The New House"
Episode 4: "Baby Pingwing"
Episode 5: "The Sorry Birds"
Episode 6: "The Seaside"

Series Two

Episode 7: "Robinson Pingwing"
Episode 8: "The Fish"
Episode 9: "Mrs Pingwing"
Episode 10: "The Flying Birds"
Episode 11: "The Rag Doll"
Episode 12: "Visitors"

Series Three

Episode 13: "A Game of Spoonball"
Episode 14: "Moving House"
Episode 15: "Buying and Selling"
Episode 16: "Ice Cream for Tea"
Episode 17: "A Proper Kitchen"
Episode 18: "Mrs Pingwing's Entertainment"
