= Blean =

Village in Kent, England

Coordinates: 51.307°N 1.043°E

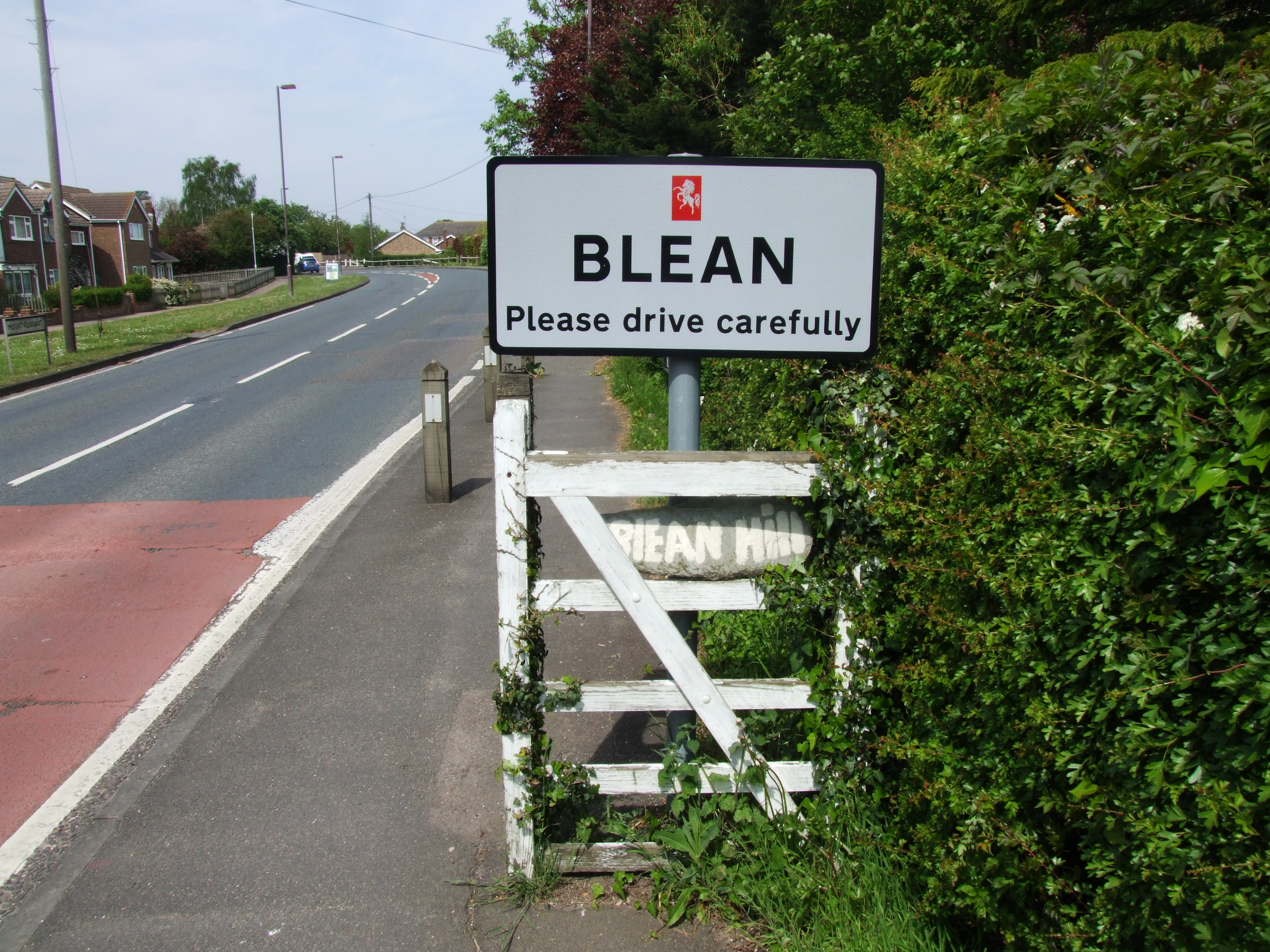
- Blean Village Sign

- Location within Kent
- Area: 13.67 km^{2} (5.28 sq mi)
- Population: 5,589 (Civil Parish 2011)
  - Density: 409/km^{2} (1,060/sq mi)
- OS grid reference: TR119608
- Civil parish: Blean
- District: City of Canterbury
- Shire county: Kent
- Region: South East
- Country: England
- Sovereign state: United Kingdom
- Post town: CANTERBURY
- Postcode district: CT2
- Dialling code: 01227
- Police: Kent
- Fire: Kent
- Ambulance: South East Coast
- UK Parliament: Canterbury

Blean is a village and civil parish in the Canterbury district of Kent, England. The civil parish is large and is mostly woodland, much of which is ancient woodland. The developed village within the parish is scattered along the road between Canterbury and Whitstable, in the middle of the Forest of Blean. Blean is part of the electoral ward of Blean Forest. The population of this ward at the 2011 census was 5,589.

== History ==
The name Blean is the dative form of the Old English word blea which means rough ground. Therefore the full name of the parish meant "the church of Saints Cosmas and Damian in the rough ground."

In 2020, an iron age enclosure was excavated at Blean Church Field. 13 pottery fragments were found dating from 50 BC to 50 AD in a linear feature that measured around 1.20 metres deep to 4 metres wide. The ancient woodland in Blean were once larger, going out to Boughton-Under-Blean and near to the Canterbury Walls. Though small portions were granted Christ Church Canterbury in 791.

Blean was mentioned in the Doomsday Book as a settlement in the hundred of Whitstable. There were 12 households of villagers. The Lord and Tenant-in-chief in 1086 was Hamo Dapifer. He held the manor until his death. King Henry II sent a letter in July 1174 to St Gregory's Priory, Canterbury, giving permission for a daily horse load worth of wood cut from Blean Woods to be used for priory and its surrounding houses in Canterbury. In the period 1271-1379, the main grain harvested in the village was oats, at 15 acres in 1291. Other crops included vetch at 11 acres, and barley and rye with smaller plots of 6 and 3 acres respectively.

During the reign of Richard I, the manor was possessed by Hamo de Crevequer, a descendant of Hamo Dapifer. In the time of his grandson Robert de Crevequer, it was seized and put in the hands of the crown. Later, the manor was granted to Bartholomew de Badlesmere, who was subsequently beheaded for high treason at the gallows of Blean on 14 April 1322. The manor was co-inherited by his four daughters: Margery, Maud, Elizabeth and Margaret. In partition of inheritance, the full share of the manor of Blean went to Margaret. She held the manor for the rest of her life. The manor was then granted to Thomas de Wolton and Robert de Denton During the reign of Henry VI, boar were hunted for sport in Blean Woods, with the king holding sylvan rights over the woods. A keeper of these boars was appointed by royal patent.

In 1835, the Blean Union Workhouse, designed by William Edmunds, was built on four acres south of Herne Common. The design was based on Sir Francis Bond Head's Plan of a Rural Workhouse for 500 Persons, a publication of the Poor Law Commission. To keep costs down, no outside drains were added, and the building was windowless. At that time, the lord of the manor and principal landowner was Earl Sondes. The workhouse was completed the following year, with room for around 298 inmates. In 1875, a small hospital was built with beds for up to 68 patients. Discipline at the workhouse was severe. A nine-year-old girl was once punished for a small offence by being forced to remain overnight in the mortuary with a corpse; the Master and Matron were dismissed as a result. By 1901, there were around 146 workhouse inmates and 17 officers.

In June 1910, the writer Virginia Woolf spent several weeks convalescing at Moat House in Blean. In a letter to fellow Bloomsbury Group member Saxon Sydney-Turner, she wrote how '[t]he rain falls, and the birds never give over singing, and hot sulphur fumes rise from the valleys, and the red cow in the field roars for her calf.'

On 1 April 2019, the parish of St Cosmus and St Damian in the Blean was renamed to "Blean".

== Religious sites ==
St Cosmus & St Damian Church

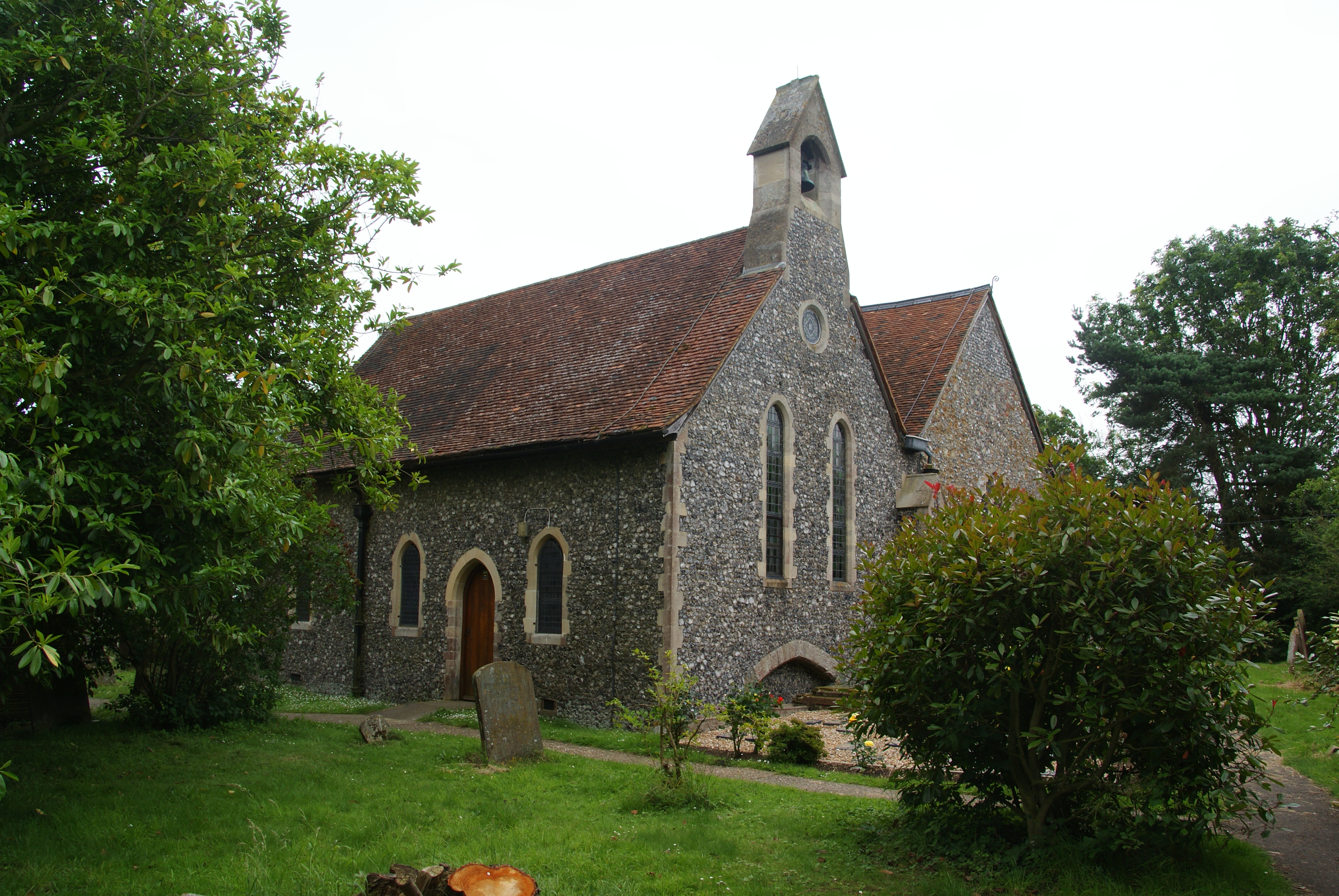
Church of St Cosmus & St Damian in the Blean

The parish church is a grade II listed building dedicated to the twin saints Cosmus and Damian. The earliest reference to the church is in the 11th century, where it is mentioned in the Domesday Monachorum. During 1233, Henry III replaced the original church, and paid 20 pounds 3 shillings to Walter de Kirkeham. The church was constructed from local flints, stone ragstone and Roman bricks. The older section still stands as part of the west wall of the nave. The roof was built of peg tiles. The stained glass dates to the 14th century. The church had a painted rood screen and bright interior. During the Reformation, the colourful features were washed down. Archbishop Mathew Parker visited in 1573, commenting that it was devoid of its original glazing. In 1659, Thomas Palmer cast and hung the bell at the west end of the church. Silver communion vessels have been found dating back to the 18th century, the two earliest around 1720 to 1721. The north aisle and south porch were added in 1866. The original stained glass was also replaced, with the work done by artist Henry Holiday. New pews were installed in 1909, which accommodated around 270 people.

== Education ==
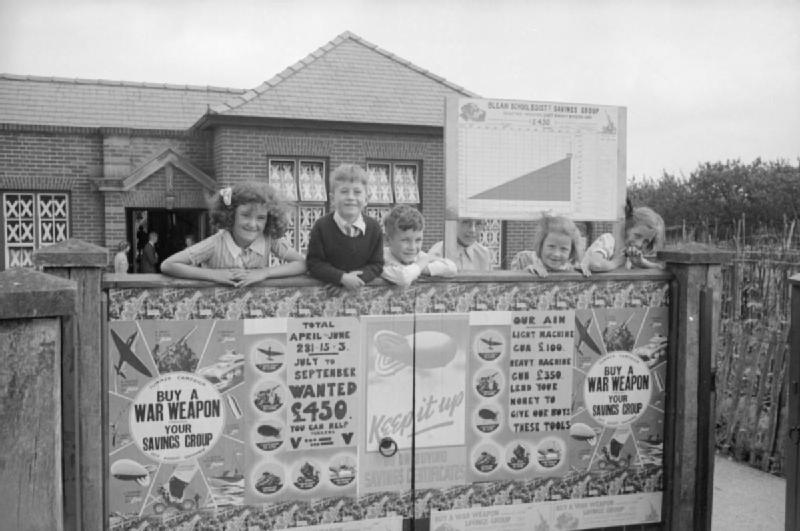
The National Savings Scheme at work in Canterbury, England, 1941

Blean Primary School, previously known as Blean School, was built in 1929 The school opened on 12 November the same year. It is a mixed gender school for ages 3 to 11. It is currently rated outstanding by Ofsted. During World War 2, the school was equipped with air raid shelters. Teachers carried torches, as the power was often cut off. Along the school walls, there were posters to identify allied and enemy planes as the action was often visible from below. In 1941, there was a small fundraiser run by six of the students for the National Savings Schemes to help with the war effort. The group raised £123 in total. Proposals for building modernisation and maintenance were approved in 2024. The combined costs were estimated at £1,440,000, with most the cost coming from proposed tendering costs.

== Economy ==
Blean's economy is closely tied to Canterbury and to a lesser extent, Whitstable. In television entertainment Smallfilms operates here the production company that created the animated series Ivor the Engine, Bagpuss and the Clangers, at Peter Firmin's barn on the Blean farm. The bay window of Firmin's house was featured in the opening sequence of Bagpuss.

== Notable people ==
Peter Firmin

== See also ==
- Listed buildings in Blean
