= Pinny's House =

1986 British animated television series

- Genre: Animation; Children's drama
- Created by: Peter Firmin
- Voices of: Matilda Thorpe
- Country of origin: United Kingdom
- Original language: English
- No. of episodes: 13

Production
- Producer: Oliver Postgate
- Running time: 5 minutes
- Production company: Smallfilms

Original release
- Network: BBC
- Release: 22 October – 12 December 1986

Related
- Tottie: The Story of a Doll's House

Pinny's House is a 1986 animated television series produced by Smallfilms, produced by Oliver Postgate. The show is based on a series of books written and illustrated by Peter Firmin and focuses on the toys in a Victorian dolls' house. The programme premiered on 22 October 1986 as part of the BBC's See-Saw programming block.

The series was the last production by duo Peter Firmin and Oliver Postgate.

== Plot ==
The series follows the adventures of Pinny, a small wooden doll that lives in a dollhouse on a shelf. A model ship sits next to the house which contains Pinny's sailor friend Victor. The 'adventures' come in the form of the home's two children, Jo and Tom, who often take the toys down to play with them.

== Episodes ==
1. A House for Pinny (22 October 1986): On a shelf, in a sitting room, are a wooden boat and a china house. Victor, the smallest sailor in the world, lives on the boat and he sets out to find a friend to live in the house.
2. Pinny and the Bird (29 October 1986): When a bird mistakes Pinny for a twig she has to find a way to escape from its nest.
3. Pinny and the Shipwreck (5 November 1986)
4. Pinny and the Truck (12 November 1986): Pinny is a doll no bigger than a pin but when Victor gets into trouble she is able to help him.
5. Pinny and the Honey Bees (19 November 1986)
6. Pinny's Party (26 November 1986)
7. Pinny and the Floppy Frog (3 December 1986): Pinny and Victor find a new cosy and comfortable neighbour.
8. Pinny in the Salad (8 December 1986): Pinny and Victor are taken into the kitchen and when they fall into Jo's salad they find a friend.
9. Pinny in the Snow (9 December 1986): Pinny and Victor are swept up and find themselves out in the cold.
10. Pinny and the Tortoise (10 December 1986): Tom and Jo make a pretend zoo and Pinny and Victor have an adventurous ride.
11. Pinny and the Paper Glider (10 December 1986): Pinny is a wooden doll no bigger than a pin but she is not afraid to fly.
12. Pinny By the Sea (11 December 1986): When Tom's new soldiers are buried in the sand Pinny and Victor find a friendly crab to help.
13. Pinny and the Holly Tree (12 December 1986)

== Broadcast ==
Although the thirteen part series was originally broadcast between October and December 1986, it received many repeats over the years, although often a repeat run would be of just eleven of the thirteen episodes.

- 1st screening: 22 Oct-12 Dec 1986
- 2nd screening: 9 Apr-25 Jun 1987
- 3rd screening: 17 Nov-4 Dec 1987
- 4th screening: 13 Jan-30 Mar 1988
- 5th screening: 18 Jul-3 Oct 1988
- 6th screening: 17 Feb-21 Apr 1989
- 7th screening: 29 Jun-14 Sep 1989
- 8th screening: 27 May-12 Jun 1991
- 9th screening: 25 Nov-11 Dec 1991
- 10th screening: 12-27 Mar 1992
- 11th screening: 2-18 Nov 1992
- 12th screening: 26 Apr-13 May 1993
