= Toti =

Toti or TOTI may refer to:

- Amanzimtoti, a coastal town in Kwa-Zulu Natal, South Africa
- Twilight of the Innocents, an album by the band Ash
- Toti (footballer, born 1987), Spanish footballer
- Toti Dal Monte (1893–1975), Italian operatic lyric soprano
- Toti Gomes (born 1999), Portuguese footballer
- Tóti, the Hungarian name for Tăuteu Commune, Bihor County, Romania
- Toți, a river in Ialomița County, Romania
- William Toti (born 1957), American naval officer, writer, photographer, businessman

== See also ==
- Totie Fields (1930–1978), American comedienne
- Toty (disambiguation)
- Totti, a name
