= Tottie =

Tottie may refer to:

- Tottie: The Story of a Doll's House, 1984 stop-motion animated television series
- Henry Tottie (1888–1952), Swedish Army officer
- Tottie Goldsmith (born 1962), Australian actress and singer

== See also ==
- "Hot Tottie", 2010 song by Usher
- Totie Fields (1930–1978), American comedienne
- Totti, a name
- Totty (disambiguation)
- Totties, a hamlet in West Yorkshire, England
