= Pogles' Wood =

- Written by: Oliver Postgate
- Voices of: Olwen Griffiths; Steve Woodman; Oliver Postgate
- Narrated by: Oliver Postgate
- Music by: Vernon Elliott
- Country of origin: United Kingdom
- No. of series: 2
- No. of episodes: 32

Production
- Production company: Smallfilms

Original release
- Network: BBC1
- Release: 29 July 1965 – 2 January 1968

Pogles' Wood (in its first series it was entitled The Pogles) is an animated British children's television show produced by Smallfilms between 1965 and 1967, first broadcast by the BBC between 1965 and 1968, and repeated regularly until the early 1970s.

The original six episode series, The Pogles, was broadcast from 29 July 1965, within the children's magazine programme Clapperboard. The 26-episode sequel, Pogles Wood, was shown as part of the Watch with Mother strand, whose target audience was pre-school children (meaning, in the 1960s, children under 5 years of age), a somewhat younger audience than that for Clapperboard.

The 32 episodes were filmed using stop-frame animation, in Peter Firmin's barn (not in a BBC television studio). All were made in black-and-white. The episodes were narrated by Oliver Postgate, who introduced the story (typically beginning each episode with the show's catchphrase, Now where shall we find the Pogles?) and also voiced several of the characters.

== Characters ==
The Pogles were small beings who lived in a hollow tree in a wood. They were not magical, but magic came to them. The four principals were Mr. and Mrs. Pogle, their adopted son Pippin, and a squirrel-like creature named Tog, who was Pippin's playmate. There was also a talking plant which sometimes told stories.

== Original series – The Pogles ==
Comprising six episodes of nine minutes each, The Pogles set the scene for the sequel series entitled Pogles' Wood. Besides its focus on the titular family, the original series is especially distinguished from the later series by its appearances of the Witch, a mysterious and evil shape-changing character, and the tone of the episodes was regarded as sinister. After initially broadcasting it, the BBC considered it "too frightening" for its proposed inclusion in Watch with Mother, intended to be viewed by a very young audience, and advised Oliver Postgate to make all future episodes revolve around more everyday countryside matters. To reinforce these changes, the title of the show was changed.

== Sequel series – Pogles' Wood ==
The subsequent 26 episodes were broadcast under the revised title Pogles' Wood. This was shown as part of the Watch With Mother strand (billed by the BBC as for the very young). In this revised show the episodes were each 15 minutes long, to fit the standard length for editions of Watch With Mother.

The first 13 episodes of the revised show centred on farm and countryside life, viewed through the eyes of Pippin, Tog, and Mr. & Mrs. Pogle. The second set of 13 programmes had a stronger story element, wherein Pippin and Tog typically find an object and take it back to the storytelling plant, who brings it to life (in a precursor of the later Bagpuss show).

Repeats from Pogles Wood continued until September 1973, when the series was retired, as BBC children's television finally moved fully over to a colour service. The umbrella series, Watch With Mother, continued (though with a change of name), but thereafter broadcast only those of its regular shows which had been made in colour.

== Episodes ==
=== The Pogles (1965) ===
No. overall	No. in season	Title	Original release date
1	1	"The Magic Bean"	29 July 1965
2	2	"A Silver Crown"	5 August 1965
3	3	"Pogle Go Home!"	12 August 1965
4	4	"A Flower For Wishes"	19 August 1965
5	5	"The Singing Bird"	26 August 1965
6	6	"King of The Fairies"	2 September 1965

=== Pogles' Wood – series 1 (1966) ===
No. overall	No. in season	Title	Original release date
7	1	"Grains of Wheat"	7 April 1966
8	2	"Milk From The Dairy"	14 April 1966
9	3	"Honey Bees"	21 April 1966
10	4	"Sheep's Wool"	28 April 1966
11	5	"Eggs For Breakfast"	5 May 1966
12	6	"Trains"	12 May 1966
13	7	"Tog-In-The-Middle"	19 May 1966
14	8	"The Secret House"	26 May 1966
15	9	"Noisy Engines"	2 June 1966
16	10	"Badgers and Bears"	9 June 1966
17	11	"Bears in the Wood"	16 June 1966
18	12	"Cake Crumbs"	23 June 1966
19	13	"Keep Clear of The Water"	30 June 1966

Note: "Tog-In-The-Middle" was sometimes billed in Radio Times as "Pig-In-The-Middle".

=== Pogles' Wood – series 2 (1967–1968) ===
No. overall	No. in season	Title	Original release date
20	1	"Woodwinds"	3 October 1967
21	2	"Strong Music"	10 October 1967
22	3	"A Little House"	17 October 1967
23	4	"Bears In The Wood"	24 October 1967
24	5	"Bricks"	31 October 1967
25	6	"A Paper Tiger"	7 November 1967
26	7	"The Princess and The Jewel"	14 November 1967
27	8	"Flowers"	21 November 1967
28	9	"Kings and Queens"	28 November 1967
29	10	"Clocks"	5 December 1967
30	11	"Woodwork"	12 December 1967
31	12	"Roundabouts"	19 December 1967
32	13	"Umbrellas"	2 January 1968

Note: "Woodwork" was sometimes billed in Radio Times as "Tree Farming".

== Comics ==
The Adventures of Pippin and Tog was a popular children's hardback based on the television show, published annually each Christmas in the 1970s. It featured comics originally pre-published in the children's magazine Pippin, drawn by Bill Mevin.

== Home media ==
All of the episodes of both The Pogles and Pogles' Wood survive, and all have been released on DVD.

Episodes of Pogles Wood, selected by its creators, were initially released on DVD in 2006 by the Dragons' Friendly Society (an organisation founded by Oliver Postgate and Peter Firmin). Subsequently, three further DVDs followed, again released by the Dragons' Friendly Society, including the final collection of 14 episodes, released in November 2015 under the title Pogles' End.

== Production staff ==
Writer and animator

- Oliver Postgate

Puppets and pictures

- Peter Firmin

Voices

- Olwen Griffiths – Mrs Pogle and Pippin
- Steve Woodman – Plant and Tog
- Oliver Postgate – Pogle, The Witch, King of the Fairies, Hedgepig, Fairies

Music

- Vernon Elliott, the British bassoonist
