= Ivor the Engine =

British animated television series (1959–1977)

- From Ivor the Engine (1959); Ivor with Jones the Steam on footplate
- Created by: Oliver Postgate
- Voices of: Oliver Postgate; Olwen Griffiths; Anthony Jackson
- Narrated by: Oliver Postgate
- Country of origin: United Kingdom
- No. of episodes: 26 (1959 b/w); 40 (1975–1977 colour)

Production
- Running time: 10 minutes per episode (b/w); 5 mins per episode (colour)
- Production companies: Smallfilms for Associated-Rediffusion (1959); Smallfilms for BBC (1975–1977)

Original release
- Network: ITV
- Release: 1959
- Network: BBC1
- Release: 1975 – 1977

Ivor the Engine is a British cutout animation television series created by Oliver Postgate and Peter Firmin's Smallfilms company. It follows the adventures of a small green steam locomotive who lives in the "top left-hand corner of Wales" and works for The Merioneth and Llantisilly Rail Traction Company Limited. His friends include Jones the Steam, Evans the Song and Dai Station, among many other characters.

== Characters ==
=== Ivor ===
Ivor is the steam locomotive of the Merioneth & Llantisilly Railway Traction Company Limited. Unlike real ones, he has a mind of his own. Ivor can drive himself and use his whistle to communicate. His fondest dream is to sing with the Grumbly & District Choral Society, a dream that is realized when his whistle is replaced with three pipes from an old fairground organ. He becomes the first bass of the choir, as well as providing them with a means of getting from place to place.

Ivor enjoys doing all sorts of things that humans do. As well as singing in the choir, he likes visiting the seaside, making tea from his boiler and spending time with his friends. He is fond of animals, and has several of them among his friends. He can be willful and disobedient at times, and it is not unknown for him to go and do his own thing when he should be working. He dislikes shunting and timetables.

Although Ivor has no technical basis, he does have technical information and a place of origin. As stated in series 2 episode 14 "Smoke hill" it is quoted that Ivor is "just an ordinary small Box tank engine, 3 Cylinder Straight linked, 0-4-0 engine By Huntington & Pottage of Crewe".

=== Jones the Steam ===
Edwin Jones is Ivor's driver. He is a cheerful and kind-hearted man who perhaps sympathizes more than most railway staff with Ivor's idiosyncrasies. Postgate and Firmin describe him as "an ordinary engine driver who is there to cope with whatever needs to be coped with". People who are new to the area find him rather eccentric for talking to his engine.

When Edwin Jones is not driving Ivor, or helping the engine with his latest flight of fancy, he enjoys fishing, and day-dreaming.

=== Dai Station ===
The station master at Llaniog, he is a stickler for the regulations of the railway, but bends the rules occasionally to help his friends. His life is made a little difficult by the fact that Ivor really does not care much for regulations at all. Although he is often gloomy and overly strict, he is a good person at heart.

=== Owen the Signal ===
Owen the Signal inhabits a signal box near Ivor's shed and makes an occasional appearance in the episodes.

=== Evans the Song ===
Evan Evans is the portly choirmaster of the Grumbly and District Choral Society. He is also Jones the Steam's wife's uncle.

=== Mrs Porty ===
A rich and eccentric aristocratic lady who enjoys the occasional glass of port and has new hats sent from London every week. She is also the owner of the railway, having bought it when the line was threatened with nationalisation, but she does not involve herself in the day-to-day running and things remained much the same after she bought it.

=== Mr Dinwiddy ===
A very odd, possibly insane miner who lives in the hills and digs for gold, he enjoys explosions and mining. In fact, his mountain is full of gold, but as soon as he digs it up, he puts it back again. He often has need of new boots.

He is something of an amateur scientist. He describes himself as "educated" and knows "something about rock". He has constructed a few odd devices, including a donkey carriage and a bubble-blowing machine.

=== Bani Moukerjee ===
An elephant keeper from India, who works for Charlie Banger's Circus, he is in charge of the elephants Alice, George, Margaret and Clarence, who all obey him without question.

=== Charlie Banger ===
Charlie Banger is an owner of Charlie Banger's Circus, who arranges a free show for the town in order to thank Jones, Evans and Mr Hughes for their help in looking after Alice the Elephant following her injury.

=== Idris the Dragon ===
Idris is a small, red Welsh dragon who also sings in the choir for a time. Having been hatched from an egg in Ivor's firebox, he lives with his wife Olwen and their twins, Daian and Blodwen, in the extinct volcano "Smoke Hill". As well as singing, he proves useful by cooking fish and chips for the choir by using his fiery breath.

On the other hand, Idris runs into trouble when Smoke Hill goes cold and needs to be kept hot in order to survive. The gasboard provide a temporary furnace, but when that became too expensive (and decimalisation renders the slot-machine inoperable), the only other option for the dragons is a heated cage. Luckily, Mr Dinwiddy is able to provide a solution, and they now live in a geothermally-heated cave under the ground.

=== Alice the Elephant ===
A circus elephant with Charlie Banger's Circus, she is normally placid, but she doesn't like taking her medicine or being bathed by anyone except her owner, Bani Moukerjee. When Ivor met her, she had escaped and was fast asleep on the track with an injured foot. Since then they have become friends. She and her elephant friends were able to help Ivor when he got stuck in the snow.

=== Bluebell the Donkey ===
A donkey who lives at Mrs Porty's house, Bluebell cannot talk, but she and Ivor just enjoy sitting around together. As the Merioneth & Llantisilly Railway Traction Company Limited has only one locomotive (apart from the short service of Juggernaut), Bluebell is sometimes called upon to provide motive power. Examples include the towing by chain of the broken down locomotive Juggernaut and also the pulling of Mrs Porty's donkey cart when this was temporarily set on the railway tracks to pursue 'robbers' when Ivor had been 'stolen' in the episode "The Lost Engine"; in this latter case, like a steam locomotive, Bluebell strictly observed the railway signals, halting the chase until Owen the Signalman had raised the signal arm.

=== Morgan the Roundabout ===
Mr Morgan is the fairground owner. He gave Ivor some pipes from the steam organ on his roundabout, so that Ivor could sing in the choir. He only appeared in the very first black and white series.

=== Claude Gilbert ===
Claude Gilbert was the station master of Tan-y-Gylch station in the original black-and-white series, and would share a cup of tea with Jones whilst Ivor rested at the platform. It was he who directed Jones and Dai to Mr Jenkins the Builder when they were searching for organ pipes to replace Ivor's whistle. Like Mr Morgan, he only appeared in the first black and white series and was not seen again.

=== Mr Hughes The Gasworks ===
The gruff but kind-hearted proprietor of the local gasworks, he is well known for keeping pets, in particular budgerigars. He is asked to provide shelter for Alice the Elephant when she has an injured foot, and, despite his initial reluctance, he more than rises to the occasion.

=== Miss Ludgrove ===
The local vet, with a dry sense of humour, who comes to examine Alice's injured foot.

=== Mr Brangwyn ===
A robust and larger-than-life pigeon-fancier, who occupies a house by the railway, and is engaged to Miss Price from Llangubbin. It is Mr Brangwyn who provides the elephant's boot for Alice: he obtained said boot during the time he once spent in India.

=== Mrs Williams ===
The local postmistress, who is a bit batty and a bit of a gossip, she occasionally interacts with Jones and Ivor.

=== Eli The Baker ===
The feisty but big-hearted and hard-working local baker.

=== Mrs Thomas ===
The local fish-and-chip shop owner and a plump woman with a big voice who serves the choir with food after their sessions.

=== Policeman Gregory ===
Mainly known as P.C. Gregory, he is a local and only village policeman. One of his most notable happenings is after Ivor went to keep the chickens warm on his boiler. Jones and Dai find three small eggs in Ivor's coal bunker, and after a small "finders-keepers" argument they are interrupted by P.C. Gregory, who then removes his helmet (which was padded on the inside) and takes the eggs. After he leaves Dai asks if the farmer will ever see those three eggs again, as P.C. Gregory likes a good egg in the morning.

=== Professor Longfellow ===
This seemingly batty professor was only seen in a few episodes. He was famously known for ordering a telescope cover, but as it was one of Ivor's deliveries, Mrs Porty believes it is her newest hat, and wears it to a meeting later in the episode. He was also notable for telling Jones, Idris, and Dai, that the closest active volcano to the now extinct "Smoke Hill" is in southern Italy.

=== Mr Mervin ===
The local bank manager, he only appears in a few episodes; his most notable appearance is his and Jones's adventure to find more half-crowns for the gas meter powering "Smoke-Hill". As this episode takes place when decimalisation occurs, Jones must inform Idris and Co. that there are no more half-crowns in Wales and that "you have had the lot". They go and find in a small shop, an old tin teapot full to the brim with half-crowns. "Smoke-Hill" is gas fired for the final time until the dragons go to Mr Dinwiddy and his geothermal heated cave.

=== Mrs Griffiths ===
Mrs Griffiths is a member of the Welsh Antiquarian Society and a passionate believer in Dragons. She first came to seeking Jones the Steam in hopes of finding Idris the dragon, after hearing that dragons had been sighted in Llannyog. Idris had already run away by this point after learning that people were looking for him so Jones misled Mrs Griffiths into giving up the search by pretending to be an insane person who spoke to railway engines (Ivor enhanced Jones' performance by not blowing his own whistle).

When Idris' home Smoke Hill lost its heat, Jones and Ivor took Idris to see Mrs Griffiths in her shop in Llanmadd. After seeing Idris and his brethren, and Ivor's self-whistling, Mrs Griffiths apologises to Jones for thinking him mad and agrees to help the dragons. Mrs Griffiths and her fellows at the Antiquarian Society hire Mr Hughes the Gasworks to fit out Smoke Hill with gas heating and in the series one finale Smoke Hill, now a gas-fired volcano, is reignited and all the characters sing in gladness, but the gas-heating includes a gas meter that only takes half-crowns, which are no longer "legal tender". On a few occasions, the gas meter runs out and Jones and Ivor have to search high and low for more half crowns.

Eventually, they use up all the half crowns in their part of Wales so they return to Mrs Griffiths for help, but Jones leaves Ivor alone in a siding while he speaks to Mrs Griffiths and two of the dragons, who were in Ivor's firebox, decide to fly about the town. They come across a statue of St. George famously slaying a dragon. The dragons, being quite young and naïve, attack St George's statue with jets of fire in the hope of saving the dragon. When Mrs Griffiths and Jones the Steam arrive, she - being horrified by the sight of two dragons attacking the statue - accuses them of vandalism and tells Jones to take them away.

=== Juggernaut ===
The Juggernaut is a diesel rail lorry made out of bits, bobs and flanged wheels, which appears towards the end of the series. Due to its shoddy brakes, it runs away down the hill and falls into the lake soon after starting service, nearly killing Idris, whom it was carrying on a chestnut barrow.

== Background ==
Having produced the live Alexander the Mouse, (Note: Paper puppets, moved by magnets and filmed in real-time.) and the stop motion animated The Journey of Master Ho for his employers Associated Rediffusion/ITV in partnership with Firmin, Oliver Postgate and his partner set up Smallfilms in a disused cow shed at Firmin's home in Blean, near Canterbury, Kent.

Ivor the Engine was Smallfilms' first production, and drew inspiration from Postgate's World War II encounter with Welshman Denzyl Ellis, a former railway locomotive fireman with the Royal Scot train, who described how steam locomotives came to life when he heated them with steam in the morning. Postgate decided to locate the story to North Wales, as it was more inspirational than the flat terrain of the English Midlands. The storylines drew heavily on, and were influenced by the works of South Wales poet Dylan Thomas.

== Production ==
Ivor the Engine used stop motion animation, of cardboard cut-outs painted with watercolours.

The series was originally made for black and white television by Smallfilms for Associated Rediffusion in 1958, but was later revived in 1975 when new episodes in colour were produced for the BBC.

The series was written, animated and narrated by Oliver Postgate, while Peter Firmin provided the artwork. The sound effects were endearingly low-tech, with the sound of Ivor's puffing made vocally by Postgate himself. The music was composed by Vernon Elliott and predominantly featured a solo bassoon, to reflect the three notes of Ivor's whistle.

Postgate and Firmin created a map of their fictional railway which was adhered to rigidly during filming.

Voices were performed by Oliver Postgate, Anthony Jackson and Olwen Griffiths. Anthony Jackson provided the voices for Dai Station, Evans the Song and Mr Dinwiddy.

== Episodes ==
The original series was in black and white and comprised six episodes which told how Ivor wanted to sing in the choir, and how his whistle was replaced with steam organ pipes from the fairground organ on Mr Morgan's roundabout.

No.	Description
1	Ivor the Engine hears the sound of a Welsh choir for the first time, and wants to join in, though he knows this is impossible.
2	Jones the Steam is concerned that Ivor is not himself. Along with Dai Station, they visit the Chief Engineer, who tells them that Ivor is physically in excellent condition, but that obviously something is bothering him, but what?
3	Dai the Station has the idea of taking Ivor back to where he first became sad. On the hill above the choir practice, Jones the Steam discovers what is bothering Ivor.
4	Evans the Song agrees to listen to Ivor's whistle, but it is too weak and rough for the choir. Jones the Steam determines to change Ivor's whistle for proper pipes, capable of making a more pleasant sound.
5	With the help of all of Ivor's friends, Jones is able to replace Ivor's whistle with three organ pipes donated from the local roundabout. Now all they need is the choir committee and the railway management to agree to Ivor joining the choir.
6	Evans the Song convinces both the choir committee and the railway bosses, and Ivor joins the choir.

There then followed two thirteen-episode series, also in black and white, and these episodes were 10 minutes each.

No.	Title	Original release date
1	"The Choral Society"	
It is a special day for Ivor the Engine. Ever since he got his new whistle, he has been chosen to take the Grumbly District Choral Society to take part in the Eisteddfod in Llanmad.
2	"The Festival"	
After the festival, it is off the seaside, but Ivor is feeling left out, so he makes a plan...
3	"The Search"	
Ivor has run away and nobody knows why.
4	"The Outing"	
After going off without a driver the other day, Ivor takes the Grumbly District Choral Society to Tewyn Beach once again for Bank Holiday, but Jones the Steam has a surprise for the little tank engine to cheer him up.
5	"Mrs Porty's Donkey"	
Ivor the Engine and Bluebell the Donkey are best friends, but their friendship causes trouble for Jones and Mrs. Porty.
6	"Dai and the Donkey"	
Dai Station is not too pleased about Ivor's new friend, Bluebell, but when Ivor comes off the rails at the points, he soon learns just how useful she can be.
7	"The Birds"	
While puffing through the forest, Ivor and Jones come across a bird's nest on the railway line, so they have to find a new home for the mother bird and her chicks.
8	"Mrs Porty's Foxes"	
Mrs Porty shows Jones and Ivor the fox cubs in the wood near her house. As Ivor and Jones go to deliver Mrs Porty's Hat for the Institute Prize Giving, they save the fox from the fox hunt, by hiding her in the hat box.
9	"Ivor's Friends"	
On a cold winter's day, Jones falls into the frozen water whilst trying to re-rail the truck leaving Ivor stuck on Tewyn Lake bridge, so it is up to his friends, the birds, to save the day.
10	"The Fire Engine"	
Some time after the lake fiasco, Ivor spots the fire engine while clearing snow.
11	"Old Nell"	
One winter's day while taking corn bags to Mr. Pugh's Farm, Ivor spots a sheep trapped on the cliffside of the old quarry line.
12	"Mr Dinwiddy's Gold"	
There's trouble on the railway. The Merioneth and Llantisilly Rail Traction Company Limited is to be sold to the Welsh National Railway Commission as a branch line and Ivor might have to become shunter at Pontypool Roads. It is up to Mr. Dinwiddy the goldminer and Mrs. Porty to save the railway from closure.
13	"Ivor's Present"	
It is Christmas in the top left hand corner of Wales and Mrs. Porty has a parcel for Ivor which he then gives to the birds.
14	"Smoke Hill"	
Smoke Hill has been dormant for years, but one day Ivor sees smoke rising from the top.
15	"Idris"	
Idris is a small Welsh dragon and has made friends with Ivor and Jones.
16	"The Fiery Breath"	
There have been reports of sudden burn marks around Llaniog, and Idris is seemingly responsible for this problem.
17	"Olwen"	
Idris and his friend, Olwen, help Mr. Thomas at his fish and chip shop.
18	"The Retreat"	
The dragons have disappeared and the Antiquarian Society have arrived. Ivor and Jones wonder what to do next.
19	"Mr Brangwyn's Box"	
Ivor, Jones and Evans are in a spot of pigeon trouble.
20	"The Invalid"	
One day, Ivor the Engine spots an elephant on the tracks after retrieving some naughty pigeons.
21	"Alice"	
Alice the elephant is poorly and has proven to be a quite difficult patient indeed.
22	"The Circus"	
The circus has come to town with free tickets for all citizens.
23	"Snowdrifts"	
Winter has arrived once again. Ivor is having a lovely time in the snow. With a winch attached to his front, he is pulling the children on sledges up the hill. He pulls too many at a time and ends up wheel-deep in the snow. Various rescue attempts prove futile.
24	"The Cold Hill"	
Smoke Hill has gone cold, which is a disaster for the dragons.
25	"The Antiquarian Society"	
Jones goes over to the Society for help.
26	"The Endowment"	
The problem with Smoke Hill is solved in a quite responsible way.

In the 1970s, the two longer black and white series were re-made in colour, with some alterations to the stories, but they did not revisit the original six. The colour series consisted of 40 five-minute films. These would often each form part of a longer story.

Although the six original black and white episodes were subsequently released on video, the two longer black and white series (totaling 26 episodes) were not and for many years were thought to have been lost. In October 2010, however, film copies of all 26 episodes were discovered in a pig shed.

When the colour series was subsequently released on DVD, some of the episodes whose content linked, were edited together, with the relevant closing and opening titles and credits removed.

The colour series episodes were:

No.	Title	Original release date
1	"The Railway"	26 January 1976
It is a typical day in the life of Ivor the Engine. Ivor delivers coal to Grumbly Gasworks, tomatoes to Mr Davy and fish to Mrs Thomas. Ivor also goes to choir practice.
2	"The Hat"	27 January 1976
Jones and Ivor bring back a package, which is supposedly a hat for Mrs Porty, but Jones and Dai discover to be a new telescope cover for Professor Longfellow and they go home for the night. In the morning, the package has gone.
3	"Old Nell"	29 January 1976
A silly sheep has got itself stuck on a ledge in the hills. Jones tries to rescue it but ends up stuck himself. He ends up sending Ivor and Old Nell, the sheepdog, to get help.
4	"Mr Brangwyn's Pigeons"	30 January 1976
Ivor has to deliver some pigeons to Mr Brangwyn. Thanks to Evans the Song, they end up escaping and on Miss Pryce's roof. There follow some amusing attempts to get them down.
5	"The Egg"	2 February 1976
Going past Smoke Hill, an extinct volcano, Jones and Ivor spot smoke coming from the top. Jones discovers a fire inside the hill and a strange egg. He puts it in Ivor's firebox to keep it warm. Mr Dinwiddy does not have any idea what it is so they go off to choir practice. During the practice there seems to be a voice coming from inside Ivor.
6	"The Proper Container"	3 February 1976
Dai Station is not pleased about Ivor's new friend, Idris, travelling in his firebox. He orders him into a box, which catches fire and then scares him off trying to extinguish it.
7	"The Alarm"	5 February 1976
After choir practice Idris helps out Mrs Thomas, whose fish fryer is on the blink. While everyone is enjoying a fish supper, Evans the Song spots a worrying article in his bit of newspaper.
8	"The Retreat"	6 February 1976
Idris is still missing when the representative of the antiquarian society arrives to interview Jones about him. After a few embarrassments, Jones and Ivor find Idris in the most obvious place.
9	"The Visitor"	9 February 1976
A rock on the line turns out to be a wounded elephant. Jones and Ivor take the elephant, named Alice, and her keeper to Mr Hugh's gasworks to recuperate.
10	"The Invalid"	10 February 1976
Jones and Evans the Song have great difficulty bathing Alice and giving her medicine.
11	"The Boot"	12 February 1976
Mr Brangwyn provides a boot for Alice to wear until her foot heals.
12	"Banger's Circus"	13 February 1976
Alice's circus, run by Mr Charlie Banger, is coming to Grumbly town. Bani and Alice are very excited.
13	"Unidentified Objects"	16 February 1976
Jones and Dai are relaxing when they spot some strange objects in the sky. The source appears to be Mr Dinwiddy's goldmine.
14	"Mrs Porty's Foxes"	17 February 1976
Mrs Porty shows Jones and Ivor the fox cubs in the wood near her house. As Ivor and Jones go to deliver Mrs Porty's Hat for the Institute Prize Giving, they save the fox from the fox hunt, by hiding her in the hat box.
15	"Bluebell"	19 February 1976
Jones is cleaning Ivor when they are called off on an emergency, as Mr Dinwiddy needs his new boots. Jones leaves Bluebell the Donkey holding the bucket. She follows them all the way to the goldmine, so Jones and Mr Dinwiddy arrange for a mode of transport.
16	"Dai and the Donkey"	20 February 1976
Dai Station is not too keen on Bluebell riding around with Ivor, but she soon proves her worth when the engine is derailed.
17	"Gold"	23 February 1976
Mr Williams of head office breaks the terrible news to Jones and Dai that the railway is to be sold and Ivor might have to do shunting at Pontypool. Then Mr Dinwiddy has a brainwave.
18	"Mrs Porty"	24 February 1976
After Mr Dinwiddy's idea falling through, Mrs Porty comes up with a solution to the railway being sold.
19	"Cold"	26 February 1976
One morning Jones and Ivor spot some smoke beside the railway line. It turns out to be Idris the Dragon. They rescue him and he explains that Smoke Hill is now extinct.
20	"The Endowment"	27 February 1976
Jones and Dai are not getting anywhere trying to find a home for Idris and the other dragons. Jones decides he must go to Lanmad and ask for the help of Mrs Griffiths.
21	"Snowdrifts"	22 November 1977
It is winter in the top left-hand corner of Wales and Ivor's railway is not running because of deep snow. Llaniog needs supplies soon, though, as Eli the Baker is nearly out of flour. What Ivor needs is a snowplough.
22	"Cold Sheep"	23 November 1977
Thanks to a new snowplough, Jones and Ivor have collected supplies from Grumbly. On the way back they come up against an unusual snowdrift.
23	"Sledging"	24 November 1977
Ivor is having a lovely time in the snow. With a winch attached to his front, he is pulling the children on sledges up the hill. He pulls too many at a time and ends up wheel-deep in the snow. Various rescue attempts prove futile.
24	"The Rescue"	25 November 1977
Some old fashioned pushers and pullers come to Ivor's rescue.
25	"The Fire Engine"	29 November 1977
There is a fire at Mr Pugh's barn but the new fire engine has got stuck in the snow. Ivor comes to the rescue, taking along the firemen and a hand-pump.
26	"The Water Tower"	30 November 1977
Something is very fishy when Ivor won't go under the water tower.
27	"Mrs Bird"	1 December 1977
Jones and Ivor decide to help a family of birds that have built a nest on the line.
28	"The Cuckoo Clock"	2 December 1977
Jones and Ivor desperately need to find the birds a home, but Mrs Porty has an answer to this problem.
29	"The Trumpet"	6 December 1977
Ivor receives a mysterious package in the post. It turns out to be a trumpet from some old friends and comes in handy for rounding up Old Idwoll's sheep.
30	"The Seaside"	7 December 1977
The Grumbly Choir decide to spend some time having fun at Tewyn Beach after taking part in the Eisteddfod, but Ivor is left alone and feels very sad. Back at Grumbly, standing sad and alone again, he decides to go off on his own.
31	"The Lost Engine"	8 December 1977
Jones discovers that Ivor has gone and Mrs Porty suspects bandits, but they later find the engine at Tewyn beach.
32	"The Outing"	9 December 1977
The choir are going on their now annual outing to Tewyn beach. They are planning a very special surprise for Ivor.
33	"The Sheepdog"	13 December 1977
Jones and Dai are watching the sheep dog trials and a very large contestant turns up to enter.
34	"Juggernaut"	14 December 1977
Ivor goes off with Banger's Circus as "The Singing Engine". His replacement is a Juggernaut built by Bynon Smith. It turns out to be a lot less reliable than Ivor.
35	"The Bird House"	15 December 1977
Ivor returns along with a small fortune and knows just what he wants to buy.
36	"Time Off"	16 December 1977
It is a lovely summers day and Ivor has finished all his work. Jones and Dai decide to go and relax by the river. Ivor feels a little left out standing by the station platform so he goes off on his own.
37	"Half-Crowns"	20 December 1977
The Dragons have nearly run out of Half-Crowns for their gas meter at Smoke Hill. Jones and Ivor find some in one of the most unlikely places.
38	"Chickens"	21 December 1977
Ivor has gone off on his own again. Dai gets quite cross about it, while Jones finds Ivor at Mr Pugh's farm along with some guests.
39	"St. George"	22 December 1977
There are some problems with Smoke Hill again, and Jones, Ivor and the dragons go to Llanmad to see Mrs Griffiths. While there, Gaian and Blodwen encounter an old enemy.
40	"Retirement"	23 December 1977
The Dragons are in danger of being caged. Luckily, Mr Dinwiddy knows just the place for them to live.

== Home media ==
Throughout the 1980s and the early '90s, BBC released a few videos of Ivor the Engine.

In 1984, a single 57-minute compiled video called Ivor the Engine and the Dragons with 13 stories joined up together as an omnibus.

VHS video title	Catalogue number (pre-cert)	Catalogue number (Uc rated)	Year of release	Episodes
Ivor the Engine and the Dragons	BBCV 9015	BBCV 4033	1 October 1984	"The Egg"; "The Proper Container"; "The Alarm"; "The Retreat"; "The Seaside"; "The Lost Engine"; "The Outing"; "Cold"; "The Endowment"; "Half-crowns"; "Chickens"; "St. George"; "Retirement"

In 1985, a single 58-minute compiled video called Ivor the Engine and the Elephants with 13 stories joined up together as an omnibus. In 1995, the video was re-released in different packaging.

VHS video title	Catalogue number (pre-cert)	Catalogue number (Uc rated)	Year of release	Episodes
Ivor the Engine and the Elephants	BBCV 9017	BBCV 4015	4 March 1985	"Mr Brangwyn's Pigeons"; "The Visitor"; "The Invalid"; "The Boot"; "Banger's Circus"; "Sheep Herding"; "Juggernaut"; "The Bird House"; "Bluebell"; "Dai and the Donkey"; "Time Off"; "Sledging"; "The Rescue"

In the early 1990s a video with six black and white stories of the very first Ivor the Engine series in the late-1950s (previously broadcast on Associated-Rediffusion) and seven colour episodes of the 1970s BBC series of Ivor the Engine, all shown as single episodes, was released. The video was introduced by Oliver Postgate.

VHS video title	Catalogue number	Year of release	Episodes
Ivor the Engine - The First Story	BBCV 4652	19 August 1991	The first six episodes in black and white and seven colour episodes that are: "The Fire Engine"; "Mrs Porty's Foxes"; "Gold?"; "Mrs Porty"; "The Water Tower"; "Cold"; "The Endowment"

In 2000, a video called The Complete Ivor The Engine containing all 26 colour episodes was released by Universal.

VHS video title	Catalogue number	Year of release	Episodes
The Complete Ivor The Engine	0781443	1 May 2000	All 26 colour episodes from the 1970s BBC version.

In 2023, a Blu-ray called Ivor The Engine - The Colour Series containing all 40 colour, fully restored episodes was released by Fabulous Films.

Blu-ray title	Catalogue number	Year of release	Episodes
Ivor The Engine - The Colour Series	5030697050038	20 November 2023	All 40 colour episodes from the 1970s BBC version.

== Books ==
Ivor the Engine was published by Abelard Schuman in 1962.

Six story books, based upon the TV series, were published in the 1970s and reprinted in 2006/07:

- Ivor the Engine: The first story
- Ivor the Engine: Snowdrifts
- Ivor the Engine: The dragon
- Ivor the Engine: The elephant
- Ivor the Engine: The Foxes
- Ivor the Engine: Ivor's Birthday
- The Ivor the Engine Annual circa 1978.

The London Borough of Hackney Public Libraries banned the entire series because of the Indian elephant keeper, called Bani because "they thought ethnic minorities might be offended by him".

== Influences and future appearances ==
In 2024, to coincide with a reprint of the original book based on the series, Ivor and The Merioneth & Llantisilly Railway Traction Company Limited were inducted as the 13th (and only fictional) member of the Great Little Trains of Wales.

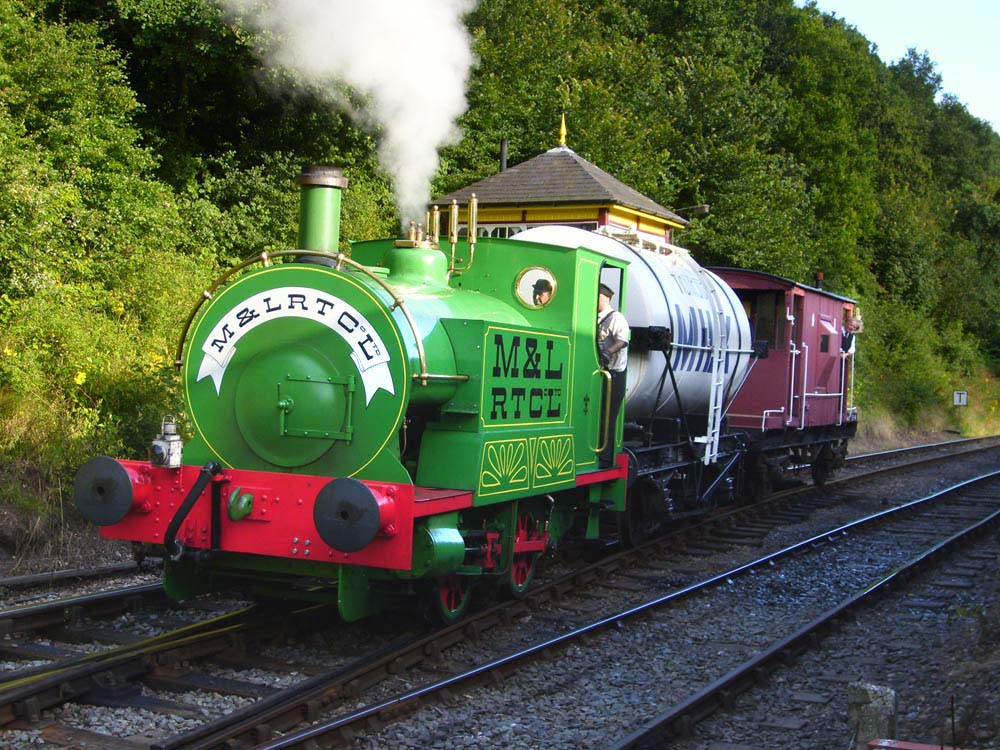
Ivor at the Battlefield Line Railway in August 2007

- The Who included a character named 'Ivor The Engine Driver' in their song "A Quick One, While He's Away", which appears on their 1966 album 'A Quick One'.
- British ska band Bad Manners also mentions Ivor on their 1980 album Loonee Tunes! with a track called "The Undersea Adventures of Ivor the Engine".
- In The Amazing Adventures of Morph episode "The Magic Wand", when Gobbledygook the alien is trying to change Chas back into a dog, Ivor, painted in navy blue with his name "Ivor" in black, makes a cameo appearance.
- In 2007, 'All Aboard with Ivor' events were held at various heritage railways around the UK following the modification of a small Peckett industrial locomotive to resemble Ivor. Railways hosting the event include the Battlefield Line Railway in Leicestershire, the Watercress Line in Hampshire and the Cholsey and Wallingford Railway in Oxfordshire.
- BBC2 Wales revived Ivor for a series of promotional spots advertising their new digital television channel "2W" for Wales. Oliver Postgate and Anthony Jackson provided new dialogue for these spots.
- Some of the artwork from production is on display at the Rupert the Bear Museum, along with several other items from the history of Smallfilms. The Rupert Bear Museum is now part of the Canterbury Heritage Museum in Stour Street, Canterbury.
- In 2011, Smallfilms collaborated with mobile gaming company Dreadnought Design to launch an Ivor the Engine game under the newly created Smallworlds brand.
- In 2014, Smallfilms collaborated with board game company Surprised Stare Games to launch an Ivor the Engine boardgame.
- Gideon Coe used Ivor's Cruising Theme as the musical bed over his last song leading up to midnight on BBC Radio 6 Music to say goodnight.
- The Sittingbourne and Kemsley Light Railway hold an annual Ivor the Engine Weekend in August.
- Functional programming language Idris was named after the dragon in the show.
- In the iPhone game, Ivor Appears with Jones the Steam.
- Rapido Trains UK developed a OO Gauge model of Ivor the Engine.
