= Totty =

Totty may refer to:

- Thomas Totty (1746–1802), Welsh naval officer of the Napoleonic Wars
- Charles Henry Totty (1873–1939), American horticulturist
- Top Totty, an English golden ale beer
- Todomatsu Matsuno, a character from the anime Osomatsu-kun and its adult spin-off Osomatsu-san; called Totty in the latter.

== See also ==
- Totties, a hamlet in West Yorkshire, England
- Totti, a name
- Toty (disambiguation)
- Toddy (disambiguation)
- Tottie (disambiguation)
