= Tottie: The Story of a Doll's House =

1984 British animated television series

- Genre: Animation; Children's drama
- Created by: Oliver Postgate
- Voices of: Una Stubbs; Anna Calder-Marshall; Nancy Gair; Olwen Griffiths; Oliver Postgate
- Country of origin: United Kingdom
- Original language: English
- No. of seasons: 2
- No. of episodes: 10

Production
- Producer: Oliver Postgate
- Running time: 15 minutes
- Production company: Smallfilms

Original release
- Network: BBC1
- Release: 6 February 1984 – 15 October 1986

Related
- What-A-Mess; Pinny's House

Tottie: The Story of a Doll's House is a 1984 stop motion animated television series produced by Smallfilms, directed and narrated by Oliver Postgate. It is based on Rumer Godden's The Dolls' House, originally published in 1947, and focuses on the toys in a Victorian dolls' house belonging to sisters Emily and Charlotte Dane. The programme debuted on BBC1 in the UK on 6 February 1984.

The series has a very dark edge, as the dolls wish very hard that good things will happen and that they will not fall on misfortune. The series opens with the phrase "Dolls are not like people. People choose, but dolls can only be chosen".

== Plot and characters ==
The dolls are a family consisting of:

- Mr. Plantaganet, who is clumsy and timid and spends the day reading his newspaper.
- Birdie, his happy wife, an inexpensive celluloid doll from a Christmas cracker.
- Apple, their son, a plush velvet baby boy doll, "no bigger than your thumb", who often speaks in rhyme.
- Darner the dog, made of clipped wool with a darning needle for a backbone.

Also living with the dolls is a painted wooden farthing doll called Tottie, who is thoughtful, sensible and keeps them all together. Mr. Plantaganet, Birdie, Tottie and Apple consider themselves a family, and the series starts with them living in a "draughty shoe-box". Only Tottie remembers living in a real dolls' house, a long, long time ago, and the rest of the dolls urge her to tell them all about it: a sitting room with real wallpaper, a fire of shining red paper, and a lamp with a white china shade that can be lit by using a birthday candle. Tottie also recalls her former housemate, an antique china doll called Marchpane, a very grand doll, clothed in lace, with eyes of the finest blue glass. The dolls wish they lived in a dolls' house like this, but Mr. Plantagenet points out that what they really wish for is to live in that exact dolls' house.

After Emily and Charlotte inherit a dolls' house from their great-aunt, the doll family are moved in. The house has a green front door with a knocker and six steps. When the Plantaganets and Tottie first move in they cannot believe their luck at finding such a splendid and well-equipped home. They soon realise that this is the very same dolls' house in which Tottie had once lived, just as they had wished, but Tottie is immediately sent away to an exhibition of dolls where she is reacquainted with Marchpane, who had been sent away for cleaning prior to being in the exhibition.

After narrowly avoiding being adopted by the Queen, Tottie returns to the others in the dolls house, but the sisters are given Marchpane which they place in the house with the Plantaganets. She is selfish, nasty and schemes to become foremost in Emily and Charlotte's affection, convincing them to reduce the other dolls to being her servants. She loathes Birdie's pleasant and trusting nature, detests Mr Plantaganet's weakness, and does her best to turn Apple against his mother.

Having gained the affection of the Dane sisters, Marchpane uses the dolls' house lights, which contain real paraffin, to start a fire and trap Apple. She guesses that Birdie will try to save her little boy, and knows that as Birdie is made of celluloid she will quickly burn. Birdie saves Apple, but is incinerated as Marchpane planned, although, because of her simplicity, she appears to enjoy the novel experience.

Emily and Charlotte discover the fire and decide from her haughty look that Marchpane is to blame. This turns the sisters against Marchpane - they desire to throw her away but are persuaded to instead permanently donate her to a museum where, in a glass case and under the constant admiring gaze of visitors, she lives happily - and increasingly vainly - ever after.

The remaining dolls settle down to life in the doll's house. While discussing Birdie's demise, Tottie remarks that "Birdie did look beautiful in the flame", and Mr. Plantaganet agrees.

== Second series ==
There were two series made - Tottie: The Story of a Doll's House (1984), of which the BBC retained copies, and The Doll's Wish (1986) which, as it was transmitted from TV, the BBC did not keep. Both series were classed as purchased programmes, which the BBC was not required to archive. Smallfilms did not retain their own copies. A few low-grade VHS copies of the second series did survive in private hands.

One such "faded" VHS copy of the second series was restored to watchable condition by the Dragons' Friendly Society (an organisation founded by Oliver Postgate and Peter Firmin). The Society released the first series on DVD with individually-burned DVD-R copies of the second series offered for sale exclusively to buyers of the first series DVD.

== Background ==
Rumer Godden's original children's book was written shortly after the Second World War. It is unusual in the sensitive way it exercises children's emotions. Initially Godden disliked the idea of Oliver Postgate reproducing the book.

Godden's publisher, Kaye Webb, founder of Puffin Books, did not see the point of the exercise either, asking "Can you really make a film in which the real life adults not only say nothing but don't even move, whilst the dolls speak and come to life?" If these hurdles were not enough, the BBC shied away from the directness of a film that showed on screen the destruction of a favourite character. Initial doubts were replaced with enthusiasm and Godden took part and persuaded her publisher, her literary agent and his family, as well as Peter Firmin and Oliver Postgate, to take on the roles of the real life characters. The film was bought by Goldcrest and sold to the BBC.

The first series was originally transmitted in February 1984, and repeated in October/November 1985 and September 1988. The second series was originally transmitted in September/October 1986 and repeated in September 1987 and December 1991/January 1992, making it a very rare example of a series transmitted as late as the 1990s on BBC TV which subsequently was for a substantial period of time no longer believed to exist in broadcast quality.

== Production staff ==
- Peter Firmin: Puppets and settings
- Josie Firmin: Doll dressing
- David Heneker: Music
- Kaye Webb: Producer
