= Toty =

Toty or TOTY may refer to:

- Toty Rodríguez (born 1942), Ecuadorian actress, TV host, singer and beauty pageant titleholder
- Toty (Brazilian footballer)
- Toy of the Year, various awards

== See also ==
- Toti (disambiguation)
- Totty (disambiguation)
