= Noggin the Nog =

British children's character

- Noggin the Nog character
- The 1992 book: The Sagas of Noggin the Nog
- First appearance: 1959
- Created by: Oliver Postgate

In-universe information
- Title: King of the Northmen
- Family: King Knut (father); Queen Grunhilda (mother)
- Spouse: Nooka of the Nooks

Noggin the Nog is a BBC Television animated (originally broadcast 1959–1965 and 1982) and a series of illustrated books (published 1965–1977), featuring a fictional character of the same name, created by Oliver Postgate and Peter Firmin. The television series is considered a cult classic from the golden age of British children's television. Noggin himself is the simple, kind and unassuming "King of the Northmen" in a roughly Viking Age setting, with various fantastic elements such as dragons, flying machines and talking birds.

Peter Firmin is said to have come up with the name of Noggin after travelling on the London Underground and seeing Neasden tube station, which made him think "Noggin".

Some of the original artwork for the series was on display at the former Rupert Bear Museum in Canterbury. The appearance of the characters was influenced by that of the Lewis chessmen in the British Museum.

== Plot and characters ==
The stories were based around the central character of Noggin, the rather simple but good-natured son of Knut, King of the Nogs, and his queen Grunhilda. When King Knut dies, Noggin must find a queen to rule beside him or else forfeit the crown to his uncle, Nogbad the Bad. Noggin meets and marries Nooka of the Nooks (an Inuk princess), and becomes the new king. Noggin and Nooka have a son, Knut, who comes to the fore in later storylines. Other regular characters include:

- Thor Nogson is Noggin's closest friend and Captain of the Royal Guard. As the "Hero of a Thousand Battles" Thor Nogson portrays himself as "fierce", but is actually anything but fierce, and is a little lazy, yet he is unfailingly loyal and never hesitates to defend the honour of his king.
- Olaf the Lofty is an eccentric and occasionally arrogant, but well-meaning, inventor. Olaf's inventions rarely work out exactly as he intends them to, although his most notable success is the Flying Machine.
- Graculus is a big green bird who arrives as Nooka's messenger in the first episode. Later by chance they return to the place of his birth and meet his family, who unlike him are incapable of human speech.
- Groliffe is a friendly ice dragon whom Noggin befriends, and who helps Noggin and his friends in a later episode.

Although the individual stories vary, any trouble encountered by the heroes is usually caused by Nogbad the Bad, who never gives up trying to claim Noggin's throne for himself. Nogbad always loses in the end, though not always through the intervention of Noggin himself.

== Television series ==
The original television series was first broadcast, beginning on 11 September 1959, by the BBC in the United Kingdom, and continued until 1965. Production company Smallfilms made 21 programmes in black and white, and six in colour, each with a running time of 10 minutes.

When the programme made a comeback in 1982 it ran for just six episodes and was made in colour. The new series comprised one new two-part story and a colour remake of the second saga, originally a six-parter, "Noggin and the Ice Dragon". The level of stop-motion animation was basic, but did not detract from the popularity of the series.

The on-screen title is "The Saga of Noggin the Nog", since the stories were based on the principle of a Norse saga, and episodes began with the words, "Listen to me and I will tell you the story of Noggin the Nog, as it was told in the days of old", or "In the lands of the North, where the Black Rocks stand guard against the cold sea, in the dark night that is very long, the Men of the Northlands sit by their great log fires and they tell a tale ... and those tales they tell are the stories of a kind and wise king and his people; they are the Sagas of Noggin the Nog. Welcome to Northlands, a tribute to Noggin, King of the Nogs and the People of the Northlands". These opening lines were accompanied by Vernon Elliott's bassoon score.

Visually, the series was primarily inspired by the Lewis chessmen (of Norse origin); one of the stories is about Noggin playing chess with Nogbad the Bad.

A new series was rumoured in the late 1990s, but nothing came of it.

The complete series was released on DVD in 2005, in a package that also included DVD versions of the short story books.

== Television sagas ==
1. "The Saga of Noggin the Nog" (a.k.a. "The King of the Nogs") (6 episodes) (b/w)
  1. "The King"
  2. "The Ship"
  3. "The Journey"
  4. "The Island"
  5. "Nogbad the Bad"
  6. "The King of the Nogs"
2. "The Ice Dragon" (6 episodes) (b/w)
  1. "The Little Man"
  2. "The Journey"
  3. "The Hot Water Valley"
  4. "The Dragon"
  5. "The Treasure"
  6. "Nogbad the Bad"
3. "The Flying Machine" (3 episodes) (b/w)
  1. "The Jar"
  2. "The Birds"
  3. "The City"
4. "The Omruds" (3 episodes) (b/w)
  1. "The Great Invention"
  2. "Under the Hill"
  3. "The Challenge"
5. "The Firecake" (3 episodes) (b/w)
  1. "The Crown of Flowers"
  2. "The Dream"
  3. "The Sorcerer's Sword"
6. "Noggin and the Ice Dragon" (4 episodes) (colour) (remake of 2nd saga)
7. "Noggin and the Pie" (2 episodes) (colour) (based on the book published in 1971)

== Books ==
Various Noggin short stories were also published, and a visitor in one of them, Noggin and the Moon Mouse, provided the basis for the characters in the popular Clangers TV series. All the books were written by Oliver Postgate, illustrated in full colour by Peter Firmin, and published by Kaye & Ward.

Edmund Ward Starting to Read books:

1. "Noggin The King" (1965)
2. "Noggin and The Whale" (1965)
3. "Noggin and The Dragon" (1966)
4. "Nogbad Comes Back!" (1966)
5. "Noggin and The Moon Mouse" (1967)
6. "Nogbad and The Elephants" (1967)
7. "Noggin and The Money" (1973)
8. "Noggin and The Storks" (1973)

There was also a standard book series published in the 1960s and 1970s consisting of 12 illustrated hardback books:

1. "King of the Nogs" (1968)
2. "The Ice Dragon" (1968)
3. "The Flying Machine" (1968)
4. "The Omruds" (1968)
5. "The Island" (1969)
6. "The Firecake" (1969)
7. "The Pie" (1971)
8. "The Flowers" (1971)
9. "The Game" (1972)
10. "The Monster" (1972)
11. "The Black-Wash" (1975)
12. "The Icebergs" (1975)

A large book about Nog's life, illustrated in black and white, was also published:

- "Nogmania" (1977) (reprinted by the Dragon's Friendly Society in 2000)

Two omnibus books were published to tie in with the colour TV series:

1. "Three Tales of Noggin Volume 1" (1981) ("Noggin the King" / "Noggin and The Whale" / "Noggin and the Moon Mouse")
2. "Three Tales of Noggin Volume 2" (1981) ("Noggin and the Dragon" / "Nogbad and the Elephant" / "Noggin and the Storks")

In 1992, a fully illustrated 96-page colour book, The Sagas of Noggin the Nog, was published by HarperCollins. This volume contains four tales: "King of the Nogs", "The Ice Dragon", "The Flying Machine", and "The Omruds".

== Theatre ==
In 1971, the Birmingham Repertory Theatre produced a stage version: Noggin the Nog – The Rings of Nudrug, with a script by Oliver Postgate and Peter Firmin. The show was designed by Firmin and included six Postgate songs, with music by Norman Dannatt. Directed by Michael Simpson, it premiered on 23 December and ran for 27 performances until 15 January 1972. Noggin was played by Piers Rogers, with Jane Sandbrook as Nooka, Paul Chapman as Nogbad and Stuart Knee as Prince Knut. A programme produced to accompany the production included this explanatory note:

"The tale of The Rings of Nudrug is a hitherto unknown story. It tells how Noggin's son, Prince Knut celebrates his birthday by taking a long and mainly unintentional journey. It tells how the Rings of the Black Sorcerer of Nudrug were brought together again, how the King of the trolls is transformed and how at last the evil power of the rings is broken".

A message to "learned Nogophilists" in the programme pointed out that there were certain discrepancies between the tale presented on stage and that seen on TV, but explained that this was a function of the frequent reinvention of mythical tales. Graculus was absent, and credit for the flying machine was here given to Olaf the Lofty. In fact, this machine was previously stated to have been invented before the birth of Prince Knut, who was seen as a youth in the stage version.

== VHS and DVD releases ==
Between 4 June 1990 and 5 August 1991, two Noggin the Nog videos were released by the BBC:

- The Saga of Noggin the Nog: Tales of the Northlands (BBCV 4359). Release: 4 June 1990. Two series:
  - "Noggin and the Ice Dragon" (colour)
  - "Noggin and The Flying Machine" (black and white)
- The Saga of Noggin the Nog: The Omruds/The Firecake' (BBCV 4651). Release: 5 August 1991. Two series:
  - "Noggin and the Omruds" (black and white)
  - "Noggin and the Firecake" (black and white)

== Recognition ==
1994 stamp: Noggin and Ice Dragon (SG1804)

Noggin has received an accolade achieved by very few Norse characters – he appeared with the Ice Dragon reading him a note from Nogbad, on a British commemorative postage stamp (SG1804) in January 1994. The art work for the stamp was drawn by Peter Firmin, who also produced a series of illustrations for the advertising campaign to publicise the new stamps. The stamp was one of a set of ten on the theme of "messages", featuring characters from British children's literature. All the characters were pictured holding a letter, note or message. Noggin's note reads: "I, Nogbad 'the Bad' do hereby promise to be 'the Good'".
