= Totti =

Totti is a given name, nickname and surname.

== Given name or nickname ==
- Totti Bergh (1935–2010), Norwegian jazz saxophonist
- Totti Cohen (1932–2010), Australian education activist
- Wuilito Fernandes (born 1990), Cape Verdean footballer
- Totti Truman Taylor (1915–1981), British actress

== Surname ==
- Benito Totti (1914–1940), Italian boxer
- Francesco Totti (born 1976), Italian footballer

== See also ==
- Totty (disambiguation)
- Tottie (disambiguation)
