= Windermere kettle =

Kettle heated by steam from boat engine

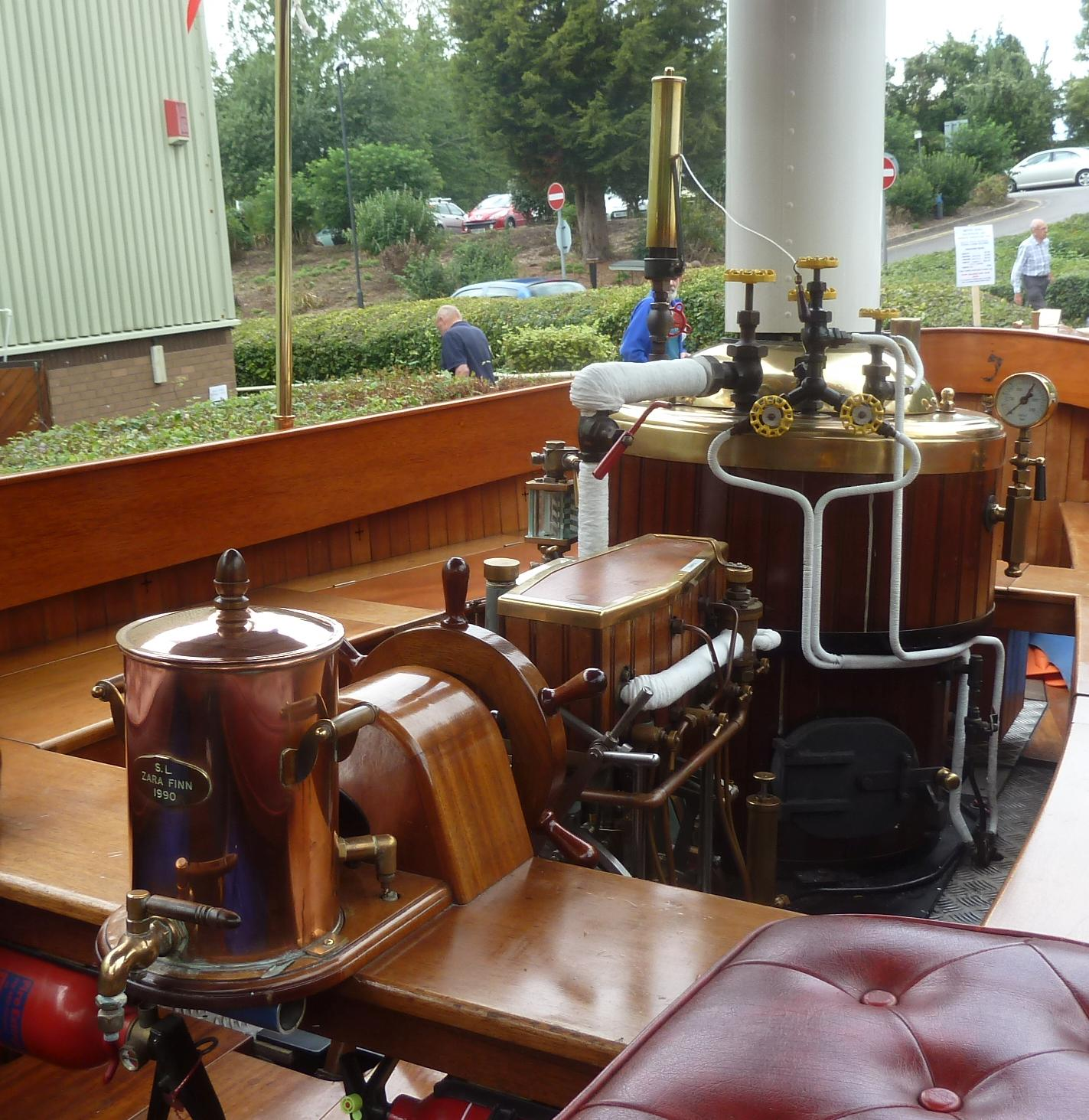
Steam launch Zara Finn, Windermere kettle to the left

A Windermere kettle is a form of steam-operated tea urn or samovar installed on some steam launches. They are a metal vessel containing a few pints of water. Inside the vessel is a steam heating coil. When hot or boiling water is required, a valve is opened and steam from the boat's propulsion boiler is passed through the coil, heating the water. Their exhaust is either overboard or up the funnel, as convenient. Windermere kettles are rapid boilers and can heat enough water to make a pot of tea in only a few seconds.

Their name is derived from the popularity of steam launches on Windermere, a lake in the English Lakes, during the Victorian and Edwardian periods. Many of these launches were equipped with such kettles.

== Misconceptions ==
- The water used is fresh water added separately to the vessel. It is not condensed steam, nor does the steam mix with it. Boiler steam is contaminated with lubricants, sometimes with chemicals for feedwater treatment, and is definitely not potable.
- The water used is not drawn from the lake. Although Windermere has famously pure water, so pure that it used directly as boiler feedwater, it is still not considered wise to drink it untreated.
