= Smallfilms =

British television production company

Smallfilms is a British television production company that made animated TV programmes for children from 1959 until the 1980s. In 2014 the company began operating again, producing a new series of its most famous show, The Clangers, but it became dormant again in 2017, after production of the show was slightly changed. It was originally a partnership between Oliver Postgate (who wrote the scripts, animated the characters, and voiced many of the characters) and Peter Firmin (who made the models of the characters and drew the artwork). Several popular series of short films were made using stop-motion animation, including Clangers, Noggin the Nog and Ivor the Engine. Another Smallfilms production, Bagpuss, came top of a BBC poll to find the favourite British children's programme of the 20th century.

== Background ==
In 1957, Postgate was appointed a stage manager with Associated-Rediffusion, the company that then held the commercial weekday television franchise for London. Attached to the children's programming section, he thought he could do better with the relatively low budgets of the then black and white television productions.

He wrote Alexander the Mouse, a story about a mouse born to be king. Using an Irish-produced magnetic system - on which animated characters were magnetically attached to a painted background, then filmed using a 45 degree mirror - he persuaded Peter Firmin, who was then teaching at the Central School of Art and Design, to create the painted backgrounds. Postgate later recalled that they broadcast around 26 of these programmes live-to-air, a task made harder by the production problems encountered by the use and restrictions of using magnets.

After the relative success of Alexander the Mouse, Postgate agreed a deal to make his next series on film, for a budget of £175 per programme (a minuscule amount even at that time). Making a stop motion animation table in his bedroom, he wrote the Chinese serial The Journey of Master Ho: a formal Chinese epic, about a small boy and a water-buffalo. This was intended for deaf children, a distinct advantage in that the production required no soundtrack, which reduced production costs. He engaged a painter to produce the backgrounds, but as the painter was classically Chinese-trained he produced them in three-quarter view, rather than in the conventional Egyptian full-view manner needed for flat animation under a camera. This resulted in Firmin's characters looking as if they were short in one leg, but the success of the production provided the foundation for Postgate and Firmin to start up their own company, solely producing animated children's television programmes, initially for ITV, but soon afterward with the BBC.

Postgate's initial BBC career was not solely concerned with Smallfilms. To gain experience, he accepted a contract as a television director in the BBC Children's Department in 1960, on a show entitled Little Laura, another animated series made on film, written and drawn by V. H. Drummond. The series continued in production until 1962, with Postgate credited also as animator on the 1962 series. He also wrote serials for long-running BBC children's programmes Blue Peter and stories for Vision On.

== History of Smallfilms ==
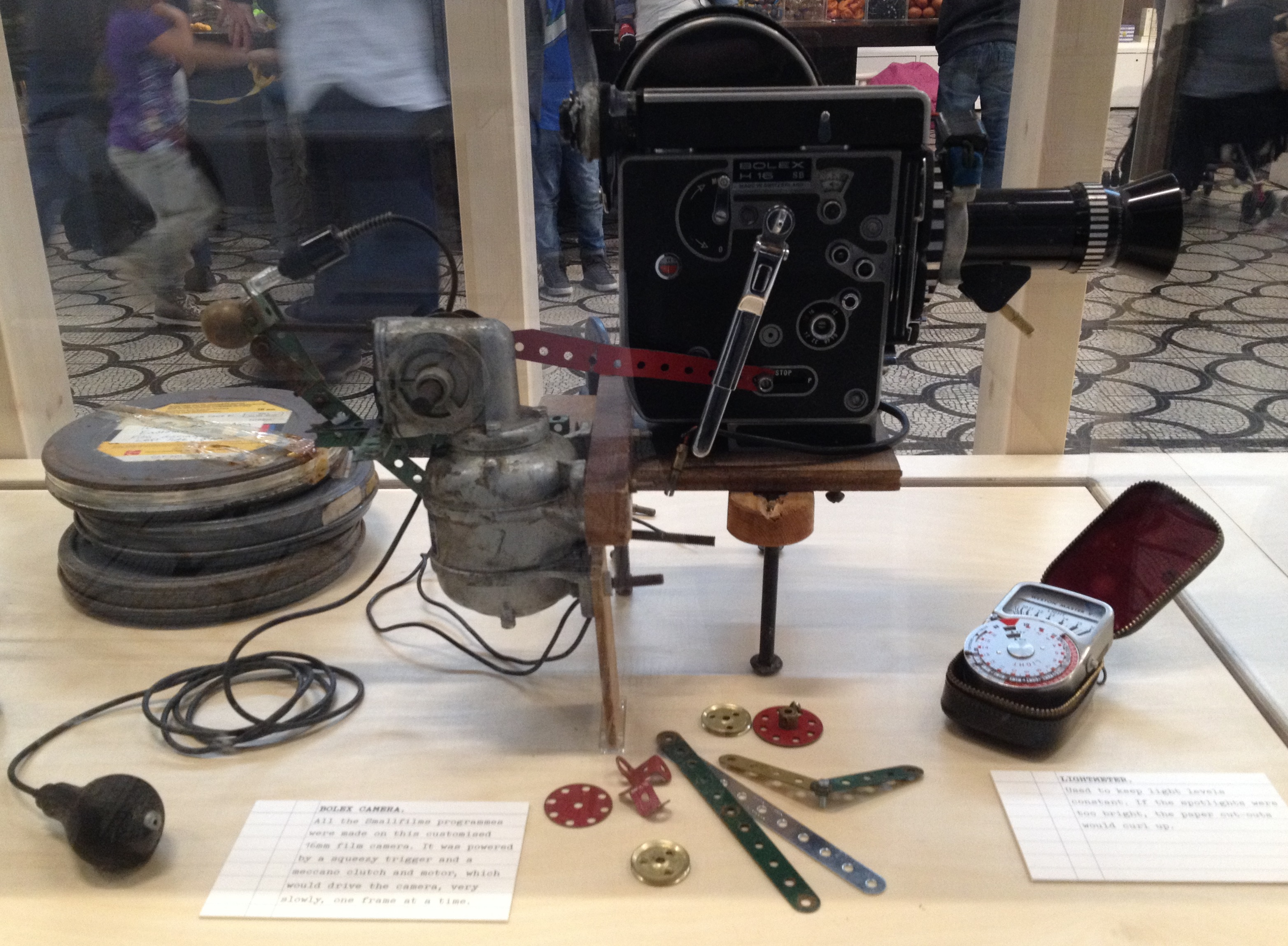
16 mm Bolex Camera used for all the Smallfilms programmes.

Setting up the business in a disused cowshed at Firmin's home in Blean near Canterbury, Kent, Postgate and Firmin made children's animation programmes, based on concepts that mostly originated from Postgate. Firmin did the artwork and built the models, whilst Postgate wrote the scripts, did the stop motion filming, and voiced many of the characters. Smallfilms was able to produce two minutes of TV-ready film per day, twelve times as much as a conventional stop motion animation studio, with Postgate moving the (originally cardboard) characters himself, and working his 16mm camera frame-by-frame with a home-made clicker. As Postgate voiced so many of the productions, including the WereBear story tapes, his distinctive voice became familiar to generations of children.

They began in 1959 with Ivor the Engine, a series for ITV about a Welsh steam locomotive who wanted to sing in a choir, based on Postgate's wartime encounter with Welshman Denzyl Ellis, who was once a fireman on the Royal Scot. It was remade in colour for the BBC in the 1970s. This was followed, also in 1959, by Noggin the Nog, their first production for the BBC, which established Smallfilms as a safe and reliable pair of hands to produce children's entertainment, in the days when the number of UK television channels was restricted to two.

Noggin the Nog was also remade in colour in 1982, but only six episodes were produced, due to the BBC believing that Smallfilms' work was "old-fashioned".

In 2000, Postgate and his friend Loaf set up a small publishing company called the Dragons Friendly Society, to look after Noggin the Nog, Pogles' Wood and Pingwings.

After Postgate's death in December 2008, Smallfilms was inherited by his son Daniel. Universal took the distribution rights to the works of Smallfilms. Any such agreement does not include the materials published through the Dragons Friendly Society.

In 2014, Daniel collaborated with Firmin on the production of a new series of Clangers, with Daniel writing many of the episodes.

== Series development and philosophy ==
Postgate and Firmin recognised that their product was not sold to children, but to commissioning television executives. Postgate described in a later interview the then "gentlemanly and rather innocent" business of programme commissioning thus: "We would go to the BBC once a year, show them the films we'd made, and they would say: 'Yes, lovely, now what are you going to do next?' We would tell them, and they would say: 'That sounds fine, we'll mark it in for eighteen months from now', and we would be given praise and encouragement and some money in advance, and we'd just go away and do it". The only occasion that this informal arrangement caused any real difficulty emerged in the 1965 series The Pogles, which BBC management felt was too frightening for the intended audience, and led to their asking for a change of direction: resulting in a revised show, and a change of name to Pogles' Wood.

Postgate had strict views regarding storylines, which perhaps limited the possibilities for series development. When asked if the Clangers adventures were quite surreal sometimes, Postgate replied: "They're surreal but logical. I have a strong prejudice against fantasy for its own sake. Once one gets to a point beyond where cause-and-effect mean anything at all, then science fiction becomes science nonsense. Everything that happened was strictly logical, according to the laws of physics which happened to apply in that part of the world".

In June 2015, the BBC's Mark Savage reported: "Firmin said the Clangers' surrealism had led to accusations that Postgate was taking hallucinogenic drugs". Firmin told Savage: "People used to say, 'Ooh, what's Oliver on, with all of these weird ideas?' And we used to say, 'He's on cups of tea and biscuits'".

The Smallfilms system was reliant on the company's two key employees, Postgate and Firmin, and was devoid of modern considerations and essentials, as Postgate pointed out: "[We were] excused the interference of educationalists, sociologists and other pseudo-scientists, which produces eventually a confection of formulae which have no integrity. No, the mainspring of what we did was because it was fun".

Recognising their commissioning audience, Smallfilms purposefully developed storylines that would engage both adults and children. While the storylines and production were remembered by children, the adult jokes, like those about the Welsh in Ivor the Engine, or the fact that the Clangers swore occasionally, gave the films an instant parental engagement, and a later nostalgic revival amongst former children re-watching their favourite programmes.

== Coolabi ==
From October 2008 until 2013, production company Coolabi held the merchandising and distribution rights to a number of the Smallfilms productions. Coolabi hoped to introduce Bagpuss to a new generation, saying that there was "significant potential to build on the affection in which this classic brand is held".

Smallfilms later returned to the production of classic shows, leading to a deal with the BBC in 2014 to produce a new series of The Clangers for broadcasting in 2015 on CBeebies, which the company also pre-sold in the United States.

== Productions ==
- Alexander the Mouse (1958, black and white for ITV)
- The Journey of Master Ho (1958, black and white for ITV)
- Ivor the Engine (1959–1963, black and white for ITV; remade in colour in 1975–77 for the BBC)
- Noggin the Nog (1959–1965, black and white for the BBC; four episodes remade in colour with two new episodes in 1982, also for the BBC)
- The Seal of Neptune (1960, black and white for the BBC)
- Pingwings (1961–1965, black and white for ITV)
- The Mermaid's Pearls (1962, black and white for the BBC)
- Pogles' Wood (1965–68, black and white for the BBC)
- Clangers (1969–1972, colour for the BBC; 1974 election special; 2015–2017)
- Bagpuss (1974, BBC)
- What-a-Mess (1979)
- Tottie: The Story of a Doll's House (1984)
- Pinny's House (1985)
