= Clangers =

British children's TV series (1969–1974)

- Created by: Oliver Postgate
- Narrated by: Oliver Postgate (1969–1972, 1974); Michael Palin (2015–2020); William Shatner (American version, 2015–2020)
- Country of origin: United Kingdom
- No. of series: 2 (original); 3 (revival)
- No. of episodes: Original series: 26 (plus 1 special); Revival series: 104 (plus 2 specials)

Production
- Camera setup: Single camera
- Running time: 10 minutes per episode (1969–1972, 1974); 11 minutes per episode (2015–2020)
- Production companies: Smallfilms (1969–1972, 1974, 2015–2017); Coolabi Productions (2015–2020); Factory (2015–2020); Ingenious Media (2015–2020)

Original release
- Network: BBC1
- Release: 16 November 1969 – 10 October 1974
- Network: CBeebies; Sprout
- Release: 15 June 2015 – 11 March 2020

Clangers (usually referred to as The Clangers) is a British stop-motion animated children's television series, consisting of short films about a family of mouse-like creatures who live on, and inside, a small moon-like planet. They speak only in a whistled language, and eat green soup (supplied by the Soup Dragon) and blue string pudding. The programmes were originally broadcast on BBC1 between 1969 and 1972, followed by a special episode which was broadcast in 1974.

The series was made by Smallfilms, the company set up by Oliver Postgate (who was the show's writer, animator and narrator) and Peter Firmin (who was its modelmaker and illustrator). Firmin designed the characters, and Joan Firmin, his wife, knitted and "dressed" them. The music, often part of the story, was provided by Vernon Elliott.

A third series, narrated by Monty Python actor Michael Palin, was broadcast in the UK in June 2015 on the BBC's CBeebies TV channel, gaining hugely successful viewing figures, following on from a short special broadcast by the BBC earlier that year. The new programmes are still made using stop-motion animation (instead of the computer-generated imagery which had replaced the original stop-motion animation in revivals of other children's shows such as Fireman Sam, Thomas & Friends and The Wombles). Further new series were made in 2017 and 2019.

Clangers won the British Academy Children's Award for Pre-School Animation in 2015.

== Background ==
The Clangers originated in a series of children's books developed from another Smallfilms production, Noggin the Nog. Publishers Kay and Ward created a series of books based on the Noggin the Nog television episodes, which was subsequently expanded into a series called Noggin First Reader, aimed at teaching children to read.

In one of these, called Noggin and the Moonmouse, published in 1967, a new horse-trough was put up in the middle of the town in the North-Lands. A spacecraft hurtled down and splash-landed in it: the top unscrewed, and out came a largish, mouse-like creature in a duffel coat, who wanted fuel for his spaceship. He showed Nooka and the children that what he needed was vinegar and soap-flakes, so they filled up the fueltank of the little spherical ship, which then "took off in a dreadful cloud smelling of vinegar and soap-flakes, covering the town with bubbles".

In 1969 (the year of NASA's first landing on the Moon), the BBC asked Smallfilms to produce a new series for colour television, but without specifying a storyline. Postgate concluded that as space exploration was topical the new series should take place in space and, inspired by the real Moon Landing, Peter Firmin designed a set which strongly resembled the Moon. Postgate adapted the Moonmouse from the 1967 story, by simply removing its tail ("because it kept getting into the soup"). Hence the Clangers looked similar to mice (and, from their pink colour, pigs). They wore clothes reminiscent of Roman armour, "against the space debris that kept falling onto the planet, lost from other places, such as television sets and bits of an Iron Chicken", and they spoke in whistled language.

== Storyline ==
The Clangers was described by Postgate as a family in space. They were small creatures living in peace and harmony on – and inside – a small, hollow planet, far, far away: nourished by Blue String Pudding, and by Green Soup harvested from the planet's volcanic soup wells by the Soup Dragon.

The word "Clanger" is said to derive from the sound made by opening the metal cover of one of the creatures' crater-like burrows, each of which was covered with an old metal dustbin lid, to protect against meteorite impacts (and space debris). In each episode there would be some problem to solve, typically concerning something invented or discovered, or some new visitor to meet. Music Trees, with note-shaped fruit, grew on the planet's surface, and music would often be an integral feature in the simple but amusing plots. In the "Fishing" episode, one of the Cheese Trees provided a cylindrical five-line staff for notes taken from the Music Trees.

Postgate provided the narration, for the most part in a soft, melodic voice, describing and accounting for the curious antics of the little blue planet's knitted pink inhabitants, and providing a "translation", as it were, for much of their whistled dialogue. Postgate claimed that in reality when the Clangers' were whistling, they were "swearing their little heads off".

== Production ==
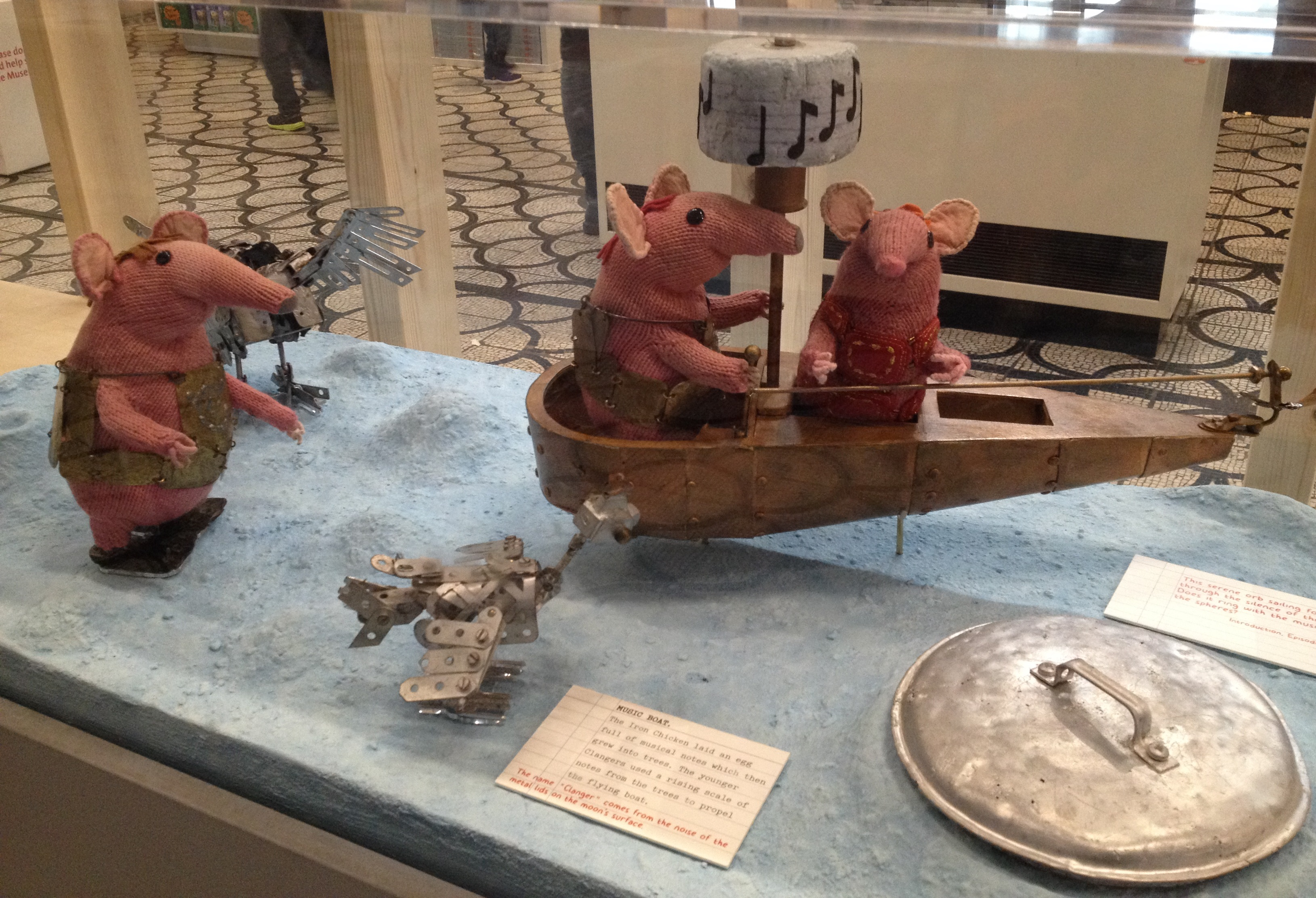
Clangers and Iron Chicken puppets at the V&A Museum of Childhood in 2016.

The first of the 26 episodes (aired as two series of 13 programmes each) was broadcast on BBC1 from 16 November 1969. The last edition of the second series was transmitted on 10 November 1972.

There was also one final programme, a seven-minute election special entitled Vote for Froglet, broadcast on 10 October 1974 (the day of the General Election). Oliver Postgate said in a 2005 interview that he was not sure whether the 1974 special still existed, and it has been referred to as a "missing episode". In fact the whole episode is available from the British Film Institute.

The original Mother Clanger puppet was stolen in 1972, but was returned in 2026 by the thief's son and put on display with the other puppets at the Beaney House of Art and Knowledge in Canterbury.

The Clangers grew in size between the first and last episodes, to allow Firmin to use an Action Man model figure in the episode "The Rock Collector".

BBC's CBeebies channel and the American pre-school channel, Sprout, produced a new series for broadcasting in their 2015 schedules, with Michael Palin narrating in place of the late Oliver Postgate. Sprout were major funders and co-producers having commissioned the series in tandem with the BBC, with William Shatner narrating the Sprout version.

== Characters ==
The principal characters are the Clangers themselves, the females wearing tabards and the males brass armour:

- Small Clanger: the son of Mother and Major Clanger, and the older brother of Tiny Clanger, Small Clanger is very inquisitive and inventive, which - despite his best intentions - has sometimes led to some element of chaos amongst the Clangers, the soup pump being a classic example. Small Clanger is often the focus of the episodes, as he is the most adventurous of the family. He wears brass armour in the original show, but wears a blue tabard in the new version.
- Tiny Clanger: youngest of the family, daughter to Mother and Major Clanger, and younger sister to Small Clanger, Tiny Clanger often plays a key role in the episodes too. She has a kind and gentle nature, that is apparent in many episodes in which a new visitor arrives, as she usually tries to communicate peacefully with them. She wears a red tabard in the original show. This changed to a bright pink one in the first series of the new version before turning to a reddish pink in later series.
- Major Clanger: the father and head of the family, he is determined to get all things right on their planet, and can be grumpy. He wears brass armour. Narrator of the 2015 series, Michael Palin, said that Major Clanger is one of his favourite characters.
- Mother Clanger: mother to Tiny Clanger and Small Clanger, Mother Clanger is the matriarch of the family and is often seen preparing and dispensing the Clangers' soup or Blue String Pudding, though her favourite thing to do is gardening. She wears a red tabard.
- Granny Clanger: an elderly Clanger, she is fond of knitting and often falls asleep. She wears a black tabard in the original show, but a lilac one in the new version. She is also Major Clanger's mother.
- Three other Clangers, two males with different coloured hair and a female wearing blue, also appear in the original episodes, but they have been dropped for the 2015 revival.

=== Other inhabitants ===
- Soup Dragon: a benign, female creature with a penchant for Blue String Soup, The Soup Dragon dwells in the soup wells within the Clangers' planet. She is often summoned by tapping on the top of what look like small inactive volcanoes; she slides the lid back, and then takes a jug from (usually) Small Clanger, which she fills for them to eat. A green glow is visible beneath her when she emerges, suggesting the presence of a substantial lake of green soup.
- Baby Soup Dragon: the Soup Dragon's son, Baby Soup Dragon was brought into the Clangers' world when the Soup Dragon became broody, which meant the Clangers could not get any soup. Tiny Clanger called the Iron Chicken by radio, for advice, and she told Tiny to get the egg which she had left on the surface of the planet and to fill it with ingredients. Then they made a nest with macaroni sticks, not far from the soup wells, and placed the egg in the middle. The Iron Chicken asked the Clangers to stand back while she shot the iron egg with a beam from her nest: this had an effect, and the Soup Dragon saw the egg and instinctively sat upon it, moments after the beam was shut off. Then the Soup Dragon was startled and leapt up to find that the egg was hatched and she had a Baby Soup Dragon.
- Froglets: a trio of small orange aliens with black, stalk-like legs and large eyes, who travel around in a top hat. In the 2015 series, they can change colour to yellow and blue (and, on one occasion, Green). In "The Medal", a series 3 episode of the revived series, 6 froglets can be seen together, and in series 2, one episode has 4, including the green one.
- The Cloud: a cotton-wool cloud that floats over the surface of the planet, releasing musical raindrops. In the 2015 series, it displays the ability to change its shape.
- Music Trees: the two small Music Trees are a permanent fixture on the surface of the Clangers' planet. They sit in a small divot on the surface (in the 2015 series, they sit atop a small hill) and are often harvested by the Clangers for their musical notes, although the Clangers always politely ask the trees first, after which the trees release some of their notes onto the ground, suggesting some form of sentience.
- Glow Buzzers: lightbulb-like creatures which live around the Clangers' caves, in hives that they fill with "Glow Honey". They helped Small Clanger find his way out of the flower caves when he followed them one time to find out where they got the Glow Honey from. The Glow Buzzers are rendered digitally in the new series.
- Iron Chicken: a "bird" made of scrap metal (modelled from Meccano), which lives in an orbiting nest made of metallic junk. The pieces were found around the Smallfilms studio.
- Iron Chick: the Iron Chicken's chick, who appeared in two episodes of series 2, but never appeared in the 2015 series.
- Sky Moos: large, flying, blue cow-like creatures that appear in several episodes. They are always hungry, which can come in handy.
- Singing Flowers: a pair of singing flowers introduced in the 2015 series who are friends of Tiny Clanger.

=== Visitors ===
Other characters appeared in only one or two episodes each:

- Hoots: small horn-like creatures with three legs, speaking like trumpets.
- A Spaceman: an astronaut who arrives to collect rock samples. Upon landing, the Clangers observe his movements and discover that he is digging up rocks. Small Clanger peeks out of a hole and takes the wicker basket he is (rather humorously) placing the collected rocks in. The astronaut turns to find his basket gone and begins to look for it, searching the surface until he lifts the lid off one of the holes only to find Tiny Clanger within. This clearly scares the astronaut, who proceeds to run away, and falls straight down one of the holes into the planet where he then falls into a soup well. After the Clangers retrieve him and clean him up, he appears to be still in shock, as he then begins to run around again in panic, at which point he accidentally runs himself into orbit around their planet. Small Clanger retrieves him with a fishing rod and a magnet. The Clangers eventually bundle him back into his spacecraft and send him home.
- Lunar Rover: the rover appeared when the Clangers were building a structure on the surface and one of them noticed an incoming object. They all dived below for safety, and on impact the rover destroyed the structure they were building, much to the Clangers' annoyance. They all observed the rover, staying just out of its sight. When it began to dig – and seemingly eat – some of the surface, Major Clanger intervened and stopped it. It then turned to face him and they attempted to shake hands, at which point the Rover's "nose" came off in Major Clanger's hand. He tries to return it, but the Rover drives off, finds a suitable bit of ground, then launches itself back into space. Major Clanger exclaims that it is "Marvellous".
- Eggbots: a group of egg-shaped, nesting doll-like robots who make sounds based on the solfège scale (each smaller Eggbot emitting a successive musical note Do-Re-Mi-Fa-So-La-Ti-Do).
- Metal Caterpillar: a metallic caterpillar who hatched from a metal egg which Small Clanger found in space, it ate anything that was metal, until it wove a cocoon and became a moth.
- Wols: metallic colorful owls, who fly by spinning. The Iron Chicken had to look after three baby Wols whilst their parent was away.
- The Tin Bird visited the Clangers' planet during an episode of the 2017 series, looking for a place to build a nest.

== Music and sound effects ==
One of the most noted aspects was the use of sound effects, with a score composed by Vernon Elliott under instructions from Postgate. Although the episodes were scripted, most of the music used in the two series was written in translation by Postgate in the form of "musical sketches" or graphs that he drew for Elliott, who converted the drawings into a musical score. The music was then recorded by the two, along with other musicians – dubbed the Clangers Ensemble – in a village hall, where they would often leave the windows open, leading to the sounds of birds outside being heard on some recordings. Much of the score was performed on Elliott's bassoon, and also included harp, clarinet, glockenspiel and bells.

The distinctive whistles made by the Clangers, performed on swanee whistles, have become as identifiable as the characters themselves, much imitated by viewers. The series creators have said that the Clangers, living in vacuum, did not communicate by sound, but rather by a type of nuclear magnetic resonance, which was translated to audible whistles for the human audience. These whistles followed the rhythm and intonation of a script in English. The action was also narrated by a voice-over from Postgate. When the series was shown without narration to a group of overseas students, however, many of them felt that the Clangers were speaking their particular language.

Postgate recounted: "When the BBC got the script, [they] rang me up and said "At the beginning of episode three, where the doors get stuck, Major Clanger says 'sod it, the bloody thing’s stuck again'. Well, darling, you can't say that on children's television, you know, I mean you just can't". I said "It's not going to be said, it's going to be whistled", but [they] just said "But people will know!" I said no, that if they had nice minds, they'd think "Oh dear, the silly thing's not working properly". If you watch the episode, the one where the rocket goes up and shoots down the Iron Chicken, Major Clanger kicks the door to make it work and his first words are "Sod it, the bloody thing's stuck again". Years later, when the merchandising took off, the Golden Bear company wanted a Clanger and a Clanger phrase for it to make when you squeezed it, they got "Sod it, the bloody thing's stuck again"!"

Series 1 episode, "The Visitor", features two brief extracts from the song, "No Smokes" (1967) by the Glasgow psychedelic band One in a Million.

John Du Prez, who wrote some of the music for Monty Python (another show Michael Palin was in) composed the score for the 2015 series.

== Episodes from the original series ==
=== Series 1 (1969–1970) ===
The first series was transmitted on BBC1 on Sundays at 5:55pm, except for the episode "Chicken" which went out at 5:50pm because there was a Children in Need appeal at 6:00pm.

No. overall	No. in series	Title	First broadcast
1	1	"Flying"	16 November 1969
Major Clanger builds a flying machine, and Tiny Clanger gets stuck at the top of the cave with a balloon.
2	2	"The Visitor"	23 November 1969
The Clangers find a television set.
3	3	"Chicken"	30 November 1969
The Clangers build some fireworks, one of which collides with a passing Iron Chicken.
4	4	"Music"	7 December 1969
Tiny Clanger discovers music.
5	5	"The Intruder"	28 December 1969
A Lunar rover lands.
6	6	"Visiting Friends"	4 January 1970
Tiny Clanger builds a helicopter to visit the Iron Chicken.
7	7	"Fishing"	11 January 1970
The Clangers build a flying music boat, and Major Clanger goes fishing in it.
8	8	"The Top Hat"	18 January 1970
The Clangers find some Froglets in a top hat.
9	9	"The Dragon Egg"	25 January 1970
The Soup Dragon gets broody, and gains a son.
10	10	"The Hoot"	1 February 1970
A noisy metal creature is retrieved from space, disturbing the Clangers' peace.
11	11	"The Meeting"	8 February 1970
More Hoots arrive, and seem upset that the first Hoot has changed.
12	12	"Treasure"	15 February 1970
Tiny Clanger finds a bag of golden coins while fishing in space.
13	13	"Goods"	22 February 1970
A machine that makes plastic items is assembled, but cannot be turned off.

=== Series 2 (1971–1972) ===
The second series episodes were also transmitted weekly on BBC1, but in a wide variety of differing timeslots. Episodes 1 and 2 were seen at 4:50 pm; episodes 3, 5 and 6 at 5:05 pm; episodes 4 and 8 at 5:00 pm; episode 7 at 4:40 pm; episode 9 at 5:30 pm; and episodes 10, 11, 12 and 13 (which followed episode 9 after a gap of more than a year) at 4:00 pm.

No. overall	No. in series	Title	First broadcast
14	1	"The Tablecloth"	18 April 1971
The Clangers use various materials to try to keep some Froglets warm.
15	2	"The Rock Collector"	25 April 1971
An astronaut arrives to collect rocks, but falls in the soup when Tiny Clanger startles him.
16	3	"Glow Honey"	2 May 1971
Small Clanger wanders off into some caves, looking for glow-honey, and gets lost.
17	4	"The Teapot"	9 May 1971
A teapot fished from space is less useful than the Clangers thought it would be.
18	5	"The Cloud"	16 May 1971
The Cloud is invited to Mother Clanger's birthday party, and rains on the Froglets.
19	6	"The Chicken Egg"	23 May 1971
The Iron Chicken lays an egg, and the Clangers try to look after it.
20	7	"The Noise Machine"	30 May 1971
The Clangers assemble a machine they find in space, and the iron chick gets into trouble.
21	8	"The Seed"	6 June 1971
The Clangers tend a seed, and soon their planet is swamped with vegetation.
22	9	"Pride"	13 June 1971
Small Clanger finds a mirror, and vanity almost costs him his supper.
23	10	"The Bags"	13 October 1972
A Gladstone bag appears on the Clangers' planet – and is mistaken for a strange, new life-form.
24	11	"The Blow Fruit"	27 October 1972
Small Clanger and the Baby Soup Dragon cause trouble playing with jet-propelled fruit.
25	12	"The Pipe Organ"	3 November 1972
When the soup-trolley loses a wheel, Major Clanger tries to make a soup-pump.
26	13	"The Music of the Spheres"	10 November 1972
Tiny Clanger is accidentally hoisted away into space by the Hoot planet.

=== Special (1974) ===
Title	First broadcast
"Vote for Froglet!"	10 October 1974
The narrator, Oliver Postgate, tries to persuade the Clangers of the merits of party politics. He explains the democratic process, and demonstrates it by asking the Clangers to vote between the Soup Dragon and a Froglet. The Soup Dragon wins the election on a policy of "No Soup for Froglets", but the Clangers are dissatisfied with the result.

An election special, entitled "Vote for Froglet!", was broadcast on the night of the October 1974 General Election. It was inspired by what Postgate referred to as the "Winter of Discontent" (a phrase from William Shakespeare's play Richard III, usually employed to refer to the winter of 1978–79, but Postgate was referring to the miners' strike in the winter of 1973-74), and partly by his recollections of post-war Germany.

This special was believed to be a lost episode for many years, but it was released in full for free by the British Film Institute to coincide with the 2017 UK General Election.

== Episodes from the revival series ==
=== Series 1 (2015–2016) ===
Episodes 1–26 were first broadcast at 5:30 pm, while episodes 27–52 were at 6:00 pm on CBeebies.

No. overall	No. in series	Title	Written by	First broadcast
1	1	"The Lost Notes"	Dave Ingham	15 June 2015
The Music Tree notes for Tiny Clanger's marvellous new melody are blown away by a big wind.
2	2	"The Little Thing"	Dan Postgate	16 June 2015
A Sky Moo gives Small Clanger a strangely shaped little thing that it has found in space.
3	3	"In The Soup"	Dave Ingham	17 June 2015
Major Clanger decides that the Soup Dragon must be fed-up with dishing up soup.
4	4	"The Knitting Machine"	Dan Postgate	18 June 2015
Major Clanger invents a knitting machine to save Granny ever having to knit again.
5	5	"The Flying Froglets"	Dan Postgate	19 June 2015
It is Granny's birthday and all the Clangers are planning their presents for her.
6	6	"I Am the Eggbot"	Dan Postgate	22 June 2015
A strange little egg-shaped creature lands on the planet and gets stuck in a cave.
7	7	"The Giant Plant"	Dave Ingham	23 June 2015
The planet is overrun with vegetation when Tiny Clanger and Small Clanger sing a growing song to a plant.
8	8	"Tiny's Lullaby"	Dan Postgate	24 June 2015
Tiny Clanger's radio hat develops a fault, so she can't hear the Iron Chicken's lullaby.
9	9	"The Crystal Trees"	Myles McLeod	25 June 2015
Crystal-shaped seeds that sparkle and glow land on the Clangers' planet.
10	10	"The Curious Tunnel"	Dave Ingham	26 June 2015
Tiny Clanger and Small Clanger discover a strange tunnel that appears to suck things upwards.
11	11	"Space Tangle"	Myles Mcleod	29 June 2015
Small Clanger has invited the Iron Chicken to a picnic, but the Iron Chicken is late.
12	12	"Lonely as a Cloud"	Dan Postgate	30 June 2015
Tiny Clanger, Small Clanger, the Froglets and the Baby Soup Dragon are having fun playing games with the Cloud.
13	13	"In a Spin"	Dave Ingham	1 July 2015
While playing a game, Tiny Clanger and Small Clanger accidentally knock over a tankard.
14	14	"Tiny's Orchestra"	Dan Postgate	2 July 2015
Tiny Clanger is stuck for ideas for a new tune to make up.
15	15	"The Metal Bug"	Dan Postgate	3 July 2015
Small Clanger finds a strange ball while out fishing in space.
16	16	"Mother's Melody"	Dan Postgate	6 July 2015
Tiny Clanger suggests that Mother Clanger makes a tune.
17	17	"Crash Bang Chicken"	Dave Ingham	7 July 2015
A Sky Moo accidentally knocks the Iron Chicken out of her nest.
18	18	"Major's Meteor"	Dave Ingham	8 July 2015
Small Clanger misses seeing two meteors streaking across the sky.
19	19	"The Singing Asteroid"	Dan Postgate	9 July 2015
Tiny Clanger and her flower friends hear a strange voice joining in with their music.
20	20	"Small's New Star"	Dan Postgate	10 July 2015
The Iron Chicken dumps a huge bundle of unwanted junk metal on to the Clangers' planet.
21	21	"Baby Soup Clanger"	Dave Ingham	13 July 2015
Baby Soup Dragon decides he wants to be a Clanger.
22	22	"Holes"	Dan Postgate	14 July 2015
Tiny Clanger and Small Clanger find two circles of cloth that are actually holes, one leading to the other.
23	23	"Bubble Trouble"	Lisa Akhurst	15 July 2015
Small Clanger and Tiny Clanger cannot resist trying out Major Clanger's cleaning machine.
24	24	"Dragon Day"	Dan Postgate	16 July 2015
Small Clanger decides that there should be a Dragon Day to thank the Soup Dragon for her soup.
25	25	"Home Sweet Hoot"	Chris Parker	17 July 2015
A little Hoot lands on the planet and causes mayhem with its incessant mischievous hooting.
26	26	"Find the Eclipse"	Dave Ingham	20 July 2015
The Clangers gather to watch a solar eclipse but the Iron Chicken's nest blocks the view.
27	27	"The Little Chill"	Daniel Postgate	17 December 2015
There are problems for a Sky Moo when the weather turns cold, but the Clangers try to help.
28	28	"The Brilliant Surprise"	Daniel Postgate	14 December 2015
The Iron Chicken says something is coming. Everyone seems to know what it is except Tiny Clanger.
29	29	"The Ball"	Dan Postgate	23 May 2016
Tiny Clanger and Small Clanger find that the Ball they were playing with has friends of its own.
30	30	"Planty"	Hickey & McCoy	24 May 2016
A family of plants arrives, and are happiest together with Granny.
31	31	"The Game"	Dan Postgate	25 May 2016
The Baby Soup dragon learns a lesson about sharing.
32	32	"Granny and Small"	Dave Ingham	26 May 2016
Small Clanger finds that there is more to Granny than she thought.
33	33	"Tiny's Good Idea"	Dave Ingham	27 May 2016
Mother's flowers are wilting. Tiny Clanger comes up with a brilliant idea to help her water them.
34	34	"Star Roses"	Myles McLeod & Dave Ingham	30 May 2016
Tiny Clanger and Small Clanger are rewarded for their patience and quick-thinking.
35	35	"Chairs"	Dan Postgate	31 May 2016
Major Clanger tries to invent a replacement chair for Granny.
36	36	"Sweet Music"	Lisa Akhurst	1 June 2016
A radio falls out of the sky, and Tiny Clanger, Small Clanger and the Baby Soup Dragon are fascinated by it.
37	37	"The Box"	Lisa Akhurst	2 June 2016
Small Clanger finds some 'space treasure' but doesn't know what it is for.
38	38	"Snapper"	Dan Postgate	3 June 2016
A robot lands on the planet, and the Clangers are scared of it.
39	39	"The Chicken Waltz"	Chris Parker	6 June 2016
Tiny Clanger and Small Clanger come up with a tune for the Iron Chicken to dance to.
40	40	"The Puzzle"	Dan Postgate	7 June 2016
Major Clanger, Mother Clanger, Tiny Clanger and Small Clanger become lost while exploring a new planet.
41	41	"The Little Bag"	Dan Postgate	8 June 2016
Small Clanger gives Tiny Clanger a lovely sparkly bag that he caught while fishing in space.
42	42	"Hide-and-Seek"	Dan Postgate	9 June 2016
The Baby Soup Dragon cheats in a race around the planet, but a Froglet spots him cheating in a game of hide and seek and decides to teach him a lesson about cheating.
43	43	"Rainbow Star"	Dan Postgate	10 June 2016
Small Clanger catches seven coloured stones floating in space.
44	44	"Busy Buzzers"	Dave Ingham	13 June 2016
Small Clanger and Major Clanger discover a bowl of glow-honey in a crater.
45	45	"Calm in the Caves"	Dave Ingham	14 June 2016
Tiny Clanger and Small Clanger discover the froglets sitting abnormally silent and calm in their cave.
46	46	"The Golden Planet"	Dan Postgate	15 June 2016
Major Clanger invents a new two-seater rocket for special trips.
47	47	"All Change Day"	Dan Postgate	16 June 2016
Major Clanger is making too much noise, so Mother Clanger suggests they swap jobs.
48	48	"The Wols"	Dan Postgate	17 June 2016
The Iron Chicken looks after the baby Wols with help from Tiny Clanger.
49	49	"The Discovery"	Dan Postgate	20 June 2016
Major Clanger discovers some wonderful wall pictures in a cave.
50	50	"Blob"	Dan Postgate	21 June 2016
The Froglets produce a noisy, bouncy, purple blob from the Top Hat.
51	51	"Building Bridges"	Dave Ingham	22 June 2016
The new table Major Clanger has made collapses, spilling soup everywhere.
52	52	"Things"	Dan Postgate	23 June 2016
Three pale things drift towards the planet seeking music, heat and light to revive them.

Following the March 2015 special, a full series was commissioned for the summer of that year. The series was narrated by Michael Palin, and co-produced by Smallfilms with the involvement of Peter Firmin and Oliver Postgate's son, Daniel. The series was directed by Chris Tichborne and Mole Hill, with music composed by John Du Prez. 52 11-minute episodes were commissioned. The voices of the Iron Chicken, the Soup Dragon, and the Baby Soup Dragon were by Dan Postgate.

The same year, William Shatner was chosen to be the American narrator for the series airing on the cable network Sprout.

=== Series 2 (2017-2018) ===
A second series of the revival, and the fourth series overall, was released on 11 September 2017 with 26 more episodes.

No. overall	No. in series	Title	First broadcast
53	1	"Round and Round"	11 September 2017
Mother Clanger closes her garden to visitors to get a bit of peace.
54	2	"The Sound Snatcher"	12 September 2017
55	3	"Woolly Welcome"	13 September 2017
56	4	"Snow Business"	14 September 2017
57	5	"Mother of Invention"	15 September 2017
58	6	"Puffball"	18 September 2017
59	7	"The Disappearing Nest"	19 September 2017
60	8	"Star Flower"	20 September 2017
61	9	"The Block"	21 September 2017
62	10	"The Strange-Smelling Flower"	24 September 2017
63	11	"Major's Low-Gravity Backpack"	25 September 2017
64	12	"The Mysterious Noise Machine"	26 September 2017
65	13	"The Tin Bird"	27 September 2017
66	14	"Chicken in Charge"	13 May 2018
67	15	"The Space Tortoise"	14 May 2018
68	16	"The Moo Flower"	15 May 2018
69	17	"One Dragon Band"	16 May 2018
70	18	"The Memory Box"	17 May 2018
71	19	"The Hoots Come to Play"	20 May 2018
72	20	"Chatter Boxes"	21 May 2018
73	21	"The Kindness Tree"	22 May 2018
74	22	"The New Froglet"	23 May 2018
75	23	"Hello"	24 May 2018
76	24	"The Other Iron Chicken"	27 May 2018
77	25	"The Forgotten Tunnel"	28 May 2018
78	26	"The Moon Whale"	29 May 2018

=== Series 3 (2019-2020) ===
A third series of the revival, and the fifth series overall was broadcast on CBeebies on 17 July 2019 with another 26 more episodes.

No. overall	No. in series	Title	First broadcast
79	1	"The Visitor"	17 July 2019
A space module lands on the Clangers planet, from which steps a human astronaut.
80	2	"Radio Wol"	21 July 2019
81	3	"Medal"	22 July 2019
82	4	"Strange Music"	23 July 2019
83	5	"Healing Harmonies"	24 July 2019
84	6	"Small to the Rescue"	25 July 2019
85	7	"The Song of the Stars"	26 July 2019
86	8	"Catch a Falling Star"	29 July 2019
87	9	"Baby Skymoo"	30 July 2019
88	10	"Small's Big Surprise"	31 July 2019
89	11	"Finders Keepers"	1 August 2019
90	12	"Woly Holiday"	2 August 2019
91	13	"Baby Skymoo and the Cloud"	5 August 2019
92	14	"The Travelling Salesman"	16 November 2019
93	15	"The Scary Thing"	17 November 2019
94	16	"The Meteor Shower"	23 November 2019
95	17	"Major's Greatest Invention"	24 November 2019
96	18	"Junk Planet"	30 November 2019
97	19	"Toots"	2 March 2020
98	20	"Treasure Hunt"	3 March 2020
99	21	"Dance Dance Dance"	4 March 2020
100	22	"A Tail Tale"	5 March 2020
101	23	"Top Hat"	6 March 2020
102	24	"The Soup Flower Trees"	9 March 2020
103	25	"Changes"	10 March 2020
104	26	"Major's Helper"	11 March 2020

=== Specials ===
No.	Title	First broadcast
1	"Eclipse of the Sun"	19 March 2015
The Clangers and Michael Palin teach children how the solar eclipse happens and how to stay safe.
2	"Meet the Clangers"	12 June 2015
CBeebies Stargazer Maggie has made a very interesting discovery with her telescope.

== Reception ==
Although not quite as popular as Bagpuss (which in 1999 was voted in a British television poll the best children's television programme ever made), since the death of Postgate in December 2008 interest has been revived in his work, which is considered to have had a notable influence on British culture throughout the 1960s, 1970s and 1980s. In 2007, Postgate and Firmin were jointly presented with the Action for Children's Arts J. M. Barrie Award "for a lifetime's achievement in delighting children".

The first episode of the revival series, which aired on 15 June 2015, turned out to be a massive hit for CBeebies. The BBC News Entertainment and Arts magazine revealed that 65% of the episode's viewing audience of 484,000 were adults, and that it was CBeebies' most watched programme of 2015 up to that date. The rating was more than double the previous record, set by an episode of Alphablocks, Numberjacks, Waybuloo, Fimbles, Charlie and Lola, Teletubbies, The Lingo Show and The Octonauts that year, as well as other CBeebies favourites since the station's launch in 2002, although an episode of Numberjacks peaked at over 1 million back in 2009.

== Awards ==
Award	Category	Result
British Academy Children's Awards 2015	Best pre-school Animation	Won
Pulcinella Awards (Italy)	Best pre-school 2015	Won
VLV Awards for excellence in broadcasting in 2015	Best Children's TV Show	Won
Broadcast Awards 2016	Best pre-school programme	Won
Televisual Bulldog Awards 2016	Best Children's show	Won
RTS Awards North West 2016	Best pre-school animation	Nominated
British Animation Awards 2016	Best pre-school show	Nominated
El Chupete International Awards (Spain) 2016	Best Children's Show	Won
British Academy Children's Awards 2016	Best pre-school Animation	Nominated
British Academy Children's Awards 2016	Best Writer	Nominated
Kidscreen Awards 2017	Best Animation	Won
British Academy Children's Awards 2018	Best pre-school Animation	Nominated
Manchester Animation Festival Awards 2018	Best Script (Dan Postgate)	Won

== Legacy ==
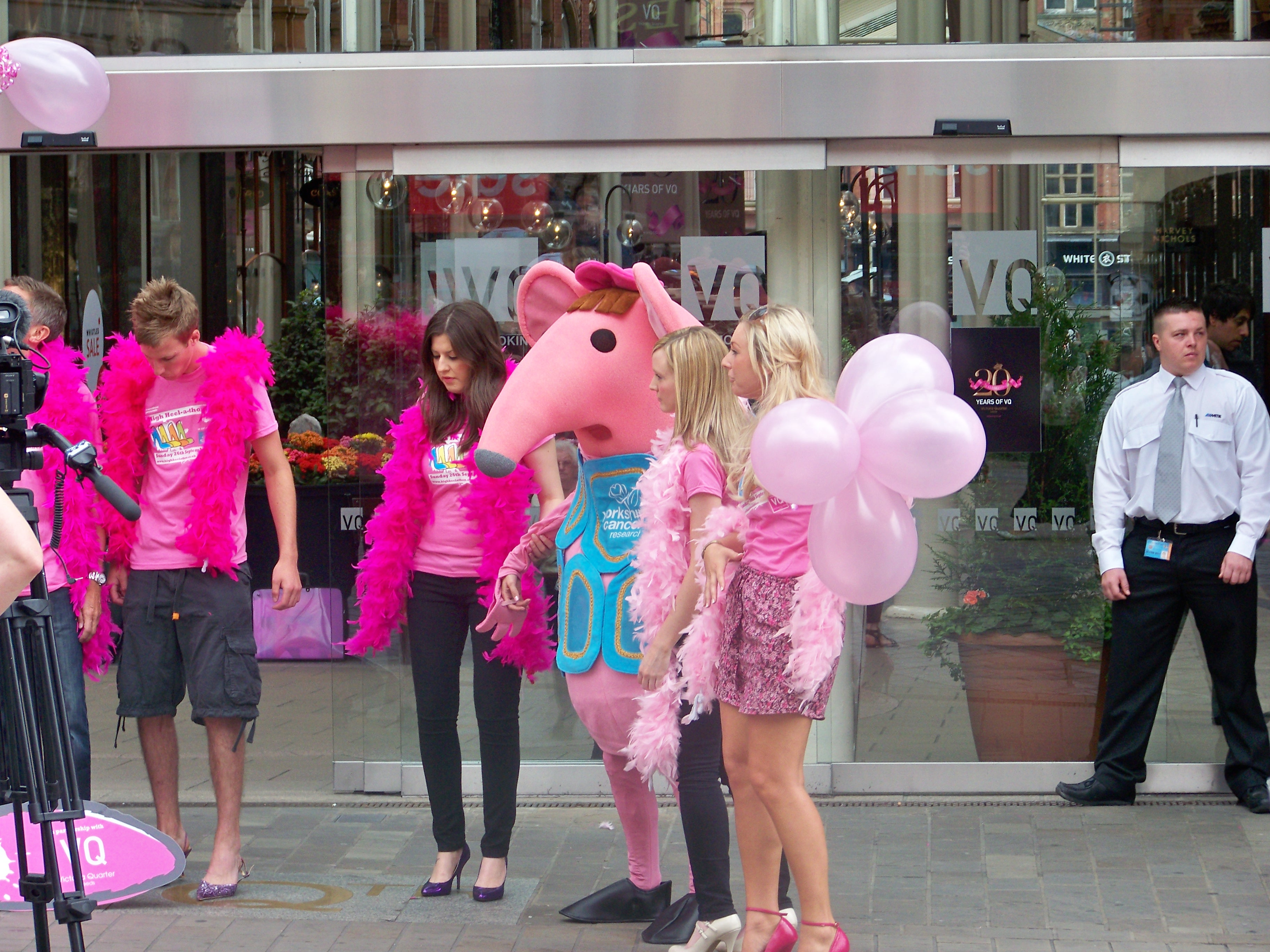
A charity collector dressed as a Clanger in 2010

The Soup Dragons, a Scottish alternative rock band of the late 1980s and early 1990s, took their name from the Clangers character.

In the 1972 Doctor Who serial "The Sea Devils", The Master is seen to be watching the episode "The Rock Collector". He states that they are fascinating creatures and even mimics their language. He is told that they are just television characters. The Master rolls his eyes.

A Clanger (as a glove-puppet rather than a stop-motion puppet) appears as a member of the "Puppet Government" in The Goodies TV episode "The Goodies Rule – O.K.?".

From the block's start until its discontinuation, the UK's Nick Jr. Classics block aired Clangers episodes specifically for parents who remembered the show.

Tiny Clanger (also as a glove-puppet) appeared on Sprout's Sunny Side Up Show in honour of the U.S. premiere of Clangers.

== Other countries ==
The series was not widely broadcast outside the UK in the 1970s, mainly because it did not require additional money from sales abroad to finance its production. Norwegian Broadcasting Corporation showed the series in 1970 and 1982, entitled Romlingane, and was narrated by Ingebrigt Davik, a popular author of children's books. It was shown on Swedish television in the late 1960s and 1970s, entitled Rymdlarna. The first 13 episodes were also shown on Czechoslovak Television in August 1972, entitled Rámusíci as a part of the children's evening program slot Večerníček.

The revived version in 2015 has received funding from Sprout, a subsidiary of NBCUniversal, and has been pre-sold to other foreign broadcasters including the Australian Broadcasting Corporation. The American transmissions are narrated by William Shatner.

As from 2018, it is also broadcast on the Belgian channel Ketnet. As of 2023 the 2015 UK version is on the American video on demand site Bentkey.

== Soundtrack album ==
Clangers: Original Television Music

Soundtrack album by Vernon Elliott & Oliver Postgate
- Released: 2001
- Recorded: 1969–1971
- Genres: Classical, children's music
- Length: 47:00
- Label: Trunk Records

In 2001, a selection of the music and sound effects was compiled by Jonny Trunk from 128 musical cues held by Postgate, who contributed act one, "The Iron Chicken and the Music Trees", of A Clangers Opera, with libretto that he had compiled.

=== Track listing ===
1. Intro Music and Dialogue from "Episode One"
2. The Start Of "Music"
3. From "Visiting Friends"
4. "Clangers running around the planet!"
5. From "Fishing"
6. From "Treasure"
7. "Some Musical Sequences"
8. From "Goods" (when the machine in the episode "Goods" went into continuous production of plastic objects)
9. "An End Title"
10. "Tiny Clangers Radio Hat"
11. "Some of Oliver's Special Clangers Effects including the Froglets"
12. From "The Rock Collector"
13. From "Glowhoney"
14. From "Teapot"
15. From "Cloud"
16. From "The Seed"
17. From "The Bags"
18. From "Blow Fruit"
19. From "The Pipe Organ"
20. From "The Music of the Spheres"
21. "A short, silent interval"
22. "A Clangers Opera, Act One" and "The Iron Chicken and the Music Trees" (compiled by Oliver Postgate)

== Home media ==
In the early 1990s, three VHS cassettes of the Clangers were released by BBC Enterprises Ltd. Later, another six cassettes were released by Universal Pictures. A number of DVDs have also been released by Universal Pictures (original series) and Signature Entertainment (revived series).

=== VHS ===
VHS video title	Year of release	Episodes
Clangers (BBCV 4374)	2 July 1990	"Chicken", "Music", "Glow Honey", "Fishing", "The Top Hat", "Goods"
Clangers 2 (BBCV 4625)	3 June 1991	"The Egg", "The Hoot", "The Meeting", "The Blow Fruit", "The Pipe Organ", "The Music of the Spheres"
The Very Best of the Clangers (BBCV 4954)	5 April 1993	"Chicken", "Music", "The Top Hat", "Tablecloth", "The Rock Collector", "The Seed", "Bags"
The Complete Clangers: Series 1	5 July 1999	"Flying", "The Visitor", "Chicken", "Music", "The Intruder", "Visiting Friends", "Fishing", "The Top Hat", "The Egg", "The Hoot", "The Meeting", "Treasure", "Goods"
The Complete Clangers: Series 2	5 July 1999	"Tablecloth", "The Rock Collector", "Glow Honey", "The Teapot", "The Cloud", "The Egg (2)", "The Noise Machine", "The Seed", "Pride", "Bags", "The Blow Fruit", "The Pipe Organ", "The Music of the Spheres"
Clangers: The Visitor and other stories	18 March 2001	"The Visitor", "Fishing", "The Rock Collector", "Goods"
Clangers: Glow-Honey and other stories	18 March 2001	"Glow Honey", "The Seed", "Bags", "The Music of the Spheres"
Clangers: Music and other stories	21 April 2003	"Music", "The Pipe Organ", "The Noise Machine", "The Hoot"
Clangers: The Egg and other stories	21 April 2003	"The Egg", "The Egg (2)", "Treasure", "Chicken"

=== DVD ===
Region 2
DVD title	Series(s)	Aspect ratio	Episode count	Total running time	Release date(s)
The Complete Clangers	1, 2 (original)	4:3	26	270 minutes	15 October 2001
The Complete Series 1	1 (original)	4:3	13	120 minutes	4 April 2005
The Complete Series 2	2 (original)	4:3	13	123 minutes	7 November 2005
The Flying Froglets and Other Clangery Tales	1 (revival)	16:9	11	121 minutes	19 October 2015
The Singing Asteroid and Other Clangery Tales	1 (revival)	16:9	11	124 minutes	25 July 2016

=== Blu-ray ===
Region B
Blu-ray title	Series(s)	Aspect ratio	Episode count	Total running time	Release date(s)
The Classic Series Complete Collection	1, 2 (original)	4:3	26	249 minutes	30 October 2023
