= Peter Firmin =

English artist and puppet maker (1928–2018)

- Born: Peter Arthur Firmin; 11 December 1928; Harwich, Essex, England
- Died: 1 July 2018 (aged 89); Blean, Kent, England
- Occupations: Artist, puppet maker, illustrator
- Spouse: Joan Firmin (m. 1952)
- Children: 6, including Hannah Firmin

Peter Arthur Firmin (11 December 1928 – 1 July 2018) was an English artist and puppet maker. He was the founder of Smallfilms, along with Oliver Postgate. Between them they created a number of popular children's TV programmes, The Saga of Noggin the Nog, Ivor the Engine, Clangers, Bagpuss and Pogles' Wood.

== Early life ==
Born in Harwich, Essex, in 1928, Peter Firmin trained at the Colchester School of Art in Colchester. After National Service in the Royal Navy, he attended Central School of Art and Design in London from 1949–1952. He worked in a stained glass studio, as an illustrator and as a lecturer.

It was while he was teaching at Central School of Art that Oliver Postgate came looking for, as Firmin put it: "... someone to illustrate a television story – someone who was hard up and would do a lot of drawing for very little money". Postgate and Firmin went on to form Smallfilms.

== Career ==
Firmin was best known as half of the Smallfilms production company, active from 1958 to the late 1980s. Most of Smallfilms' animation work was produced in a barn on Firmin's land in Blean near Canterbury in Kent. Firmin made the sets, puppets and backdrops for the programmes, often also contributing to making sound and visual effects during filming.

In addition to his work with Oliver Postgate, Firmin made other puppets and children's programmes. In 1959, with his wife Joan, he devised a programme of nursery rhymes for Associated-Rediffusion, called The Musical Box, which used live cardboard animation and puppets. It was presented by Rolf Harris and then by Wally Whyton.

In 1961, ITV commissioned another puppet. Ollie Beak was a little owl made of chicken feathers stuck into a crocheted body. He appeared on Smalltime, and was joined in 1962 by Fred Barker (a shaggy dog made for Postgate/Firmin 1961 production The Dog Watch) and in 1963 by Whiffles, an otter puppet, and Penelope, another owl.

With Ivan Owen, Firmin co-created the TV puppet Basil Brush in 1962. He made the first puppet for The Three Scampies, using a real fox brush, lending the correct name for a fox’s tail to the puppet character.

For the UK's Decimal Day (15 February 1971), Muskit, a character created by Firmin for Pippin comic, appeared with Firmin and made a trip to the shops in a BBC TV schools' programme.

Firmin continued to work as an illustrator. He wrote and illustrated many books of Smallfilms characters, as well as children's books of his own devising and books for adults including Vita Sackville-West's poetry (ISBN 9780863502729) and Seeing Things, Postgate's autobiography (ISBN 978-1847678416).

== Printmaker ==
Firmin, having retired from TV production, produced engravings and linocuts.

== Noggin stamp ==
In 1994, Firmin provided an illustration for a British postage stamp, SG1804, featuring characters from Noggin the Nog. It was one of a set featuring characters from British children's literature. He produced further illustrations for the advertising campaign to publicise the stamps.

== Recognition ==
He was awarded an honorary MA by the University of Kent on 17 July 1987 and an Honorary degree from the University of Essex in 2012. In 2011 Firmin was awarded the Freedom of the City of Canterbury in recognition of his "outstanding work".

He received the BAFTA Lifetime Achievement Award in 2014.

In 2017 he was made an honorary fellow of University of the Arts London, which incorporates his alma mater Central School of Art, now Central Saint Martins.

Between 12 May and 29 July 2018, Firmin's work was featured in the exhibition Clangers, Bagpuss & Co, organised by the V&A Museum of Childhood at the Ferens Art Gallery in Hull.

== Personal life ==
Firmin was married to Joan, who knitted the Clangers from vibrant pink wool. They met at the Central School of Art and Design in London, where Joan was studying bookbinding. They were married in 1952 and lived in London until moving to Kent in 1959. They had six daughters: One, Emily, appeared in the opening sequence of Bagpuss.

The Firmins lived on the farm in Blean, Kent, where Smallfilms produced their programmes.

Firmin died on 1 July 2018 at his home in Kent after a short illness at the age of 89. All the new episodes of Clangers made after this date were dedicated to his memory - the epitaph "In loving memory of Peter Firmin" can be seen at the end of the credits of these episodes.

== Publications ==
- Basil Brush Goes Flying, written and illustrated by Peter Firmin (Issue 8 of Edmund Ward Starting to Read Books) (Kaye & Ward Limited, 1969) ISBN 9780718203405
- Stanley, the tale of the Lizard, Peter Meteyard; illustrated by Peter Firmin (Andre Deutsch, 1979) ISBN 9780233970714
- The Last of the Dragons, E. Nesbit; illustrated by Peter Firmin (Macdonald, 1980) ISBN 9780233970714
- Melisande, E. Nesbit; illustrated by Peter Firmin (MacDonald, 1980) ISBN 978-0356051635
- The Winter Diary of a Country Rat, written and illustrated by Peter Firmin (Kaye and Ward, 1981) ISBN 0-7182-2541-4
- Chicken Stew, written and illustrated by Peter Firmin (Pelham Books, 1982) ISBN 978-0720712995
- Tricks & Tales, written and illustrated by Peter Firmin (Kaye and Ward, 1982) ISBN 0-7182-2600-3
- The Midsummer Notebook of a Country Rat, written and illustrated by Peter Firmin (Kaye and Ward, 1983) ISBN 0-7182-2601-1
- Pinny and the Bird and other Pinny tales, written and illustrated by Peter Firmin (Andre Deutsch, 1985) ISBN 9780233978154
- Pinny and the Floppy Frog ISBN 9780233979151 Pinny's Party ISBN 9780233978574, written and illustrated by Peter Firmin (Andre Deutsch, 1987)
- My Dog Sandy, written and illustrated by Peter Firmin (Andre Deutsch, 1988) ISBN 9780233981963
- Making Faces, written and illustrated by Peter Firmin (Collins Pic- Lions Publishing, 1988) ISBN 9780006628804
- Ziggy and the Ice Ogre, Chris Powling, illustrated by Peter Firmin (Heinemann, 1988) ISBN 9780434930517
- The Jenius, Dick King Smith, illustrated by Peter Firmin (Victor Gollancz, 1988) ISBN 9780141312866
- Nina's Machines, written and illustrated by Peter Firmin (A & C Black, 1988) ISBN 9780006732921
- Boastful Mr Bear ISBN 9780947553012, Happy Miss Rat ISBN 9780440403821, Hungry Mr Fox ISBN 9780947553036, Foolish Miss Crow ISBN 9780947553043, written and illustrated by Peter Firmin (Bolitha Press & Dell of NY, 1989)
- The Land and the Garden, Vita Sackville-West, illustrated by Peter Firmin (Webb & Bower, 1989) ISBN 9780863502729
- Seeing Things: An Autobiography, Oliver Postgate; illustrated by Peter Firmin, 2000 ISBN 0-330-39000-7
