= Firmin =

- Language: French

Origin
- Origin: Firminus
- Derivation: firmus
- Meaning: firm, steadfast
- Region of origin: France

Other names
- Cognates: Firmino, Fermin

Firmin is a French surname and masculine given name, from the Late Latin Firminus, a derivative of firmus meaning "firm" or "steadfast". The instruction of St Paul to "be steadfast in the faith" gave the name great popularity among early Christians.

== People with the surname ==
- Agnès Firmin-Le Bodo (born 1968), French politician
- Anténor Firmin (1850–1911), Haitian anthropologist, journalist and politician
- Col Firmin (1940–2013), Australian politician
- Giles Firmin (1614–1697), English minister and physician
- Hannah Firmin (born 1956), English illustrator, daughter of Peter Firmin
- Mickaël Firmin (born 1990), French professional footballer
- Peter Firmin (1926–2018), English artist and animator
- Thomas Firmin (1632–1697), English businessman and philanthropist
- Philip Firmin, title character of the 1861–62 novel The Adventures of Philip by W. M. Thackeray

== People with the given name ==
- Firmin Abauzit (1679–1767), French scholar
- Firmin António, Brazilian businessman
- Firmin Ayessa (born 1951), Congolese politician
- Firmin Bouisset (1859–1925), French painter and poster artist
- Firmin V. Desloge (1843-1929), French-American industrialist and philanthropist in St. Louis
- Firmin Didot (1764–1836), French printer and engraver
- Firmin Djidingar (born 1944), Chadian politician
- Firmin Dugas (1830–1889), Canadian businessman and politician
- Firmin Flamand, Belgian Olympic archer (fl. 1920)
- Firmin Gillot (1820–1872), photography pioneer
- Firmin Lebel (died 1573), French composer and choir director
- Firmin Lambot (1886–1964), Belgian cyclist
- Firmin Marbeau (1798–1875), French philanthropist
- Firmin Monestime (1909–1977), Haitian politician and medical doctor
- Firmin Sanou (born 1973), Burkina Faso footballer
- Firmin Martin Schmidt (1918-2005), American Roman Catholic bishop
- Firmin Swinnen (1985-1972), Belgian theatre organist
- Pascal-Firmin Ndimira (b. 1956), Prime Minister of Burundi (1996–98)

== See also ==
- Firmin: Adventures of a Metropolitan Lowlife by Sam Savage
- Saint-Firmin (disambiguation), several places in France
- Saint Fermin of Amiens, 3rd century Catholic saint
- Firmin & Sons, Ceremonial Uniform manufacturer in the UK
