= Benney (surname) =

Benney is a surname. Notable people with the surname include:

- David Benney (1930–2015), New Zealand applied mathematician
- Gerald Benney (1930–2008), British silver and goldsmith
- Matt Benney (1902–1980), New Zealand civil servant and politician
- Paul Benney (born 1959), British artist
- Simon Benney (born 1966), British silver and goldsmith
