= List of royal warrant holders of the British royal family =

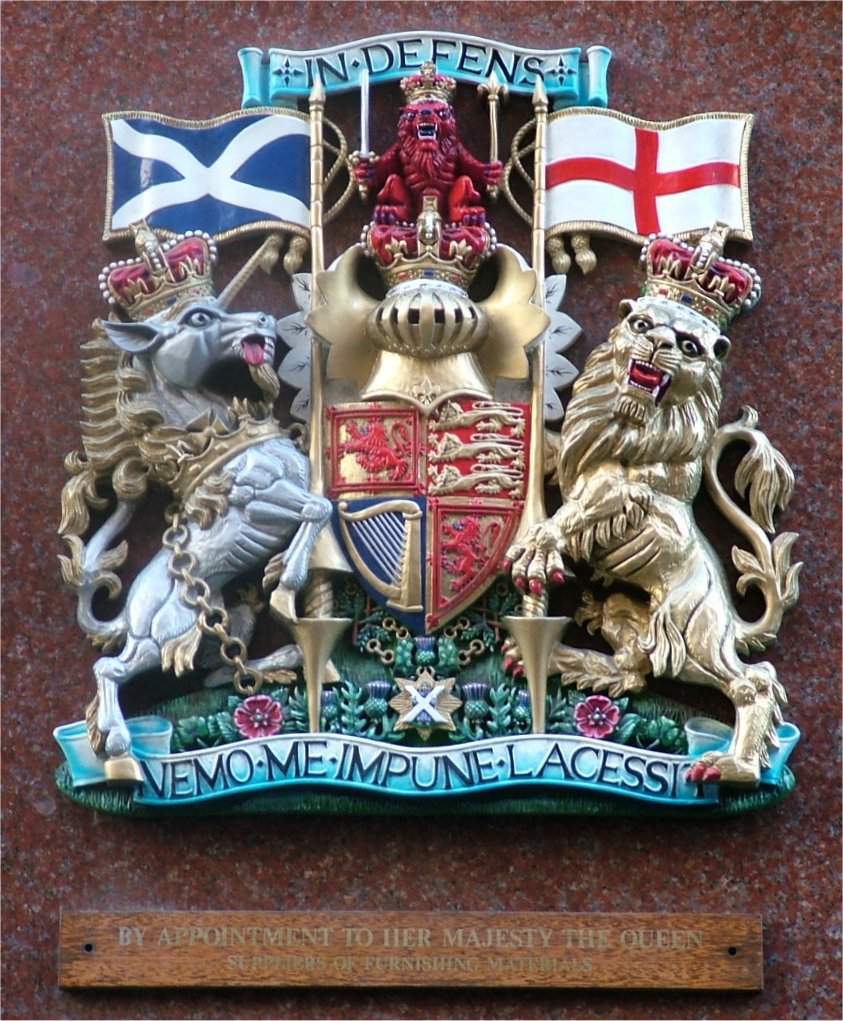
Royal Warrant awarded by Elizabeth II to Jenners, a department store in Edinburgh

This is a list of past royal warrant of appointment holders of the British royal family. A full list is available here.

British royal warrants are currently granted by King Charles III and Queen Camilla to companies or tradespeople who supply goods and services. The warrant enables the supplier to advertise that they supply to the royal family. The professions, employment agencies, party planners, the media, government departments, and "places of refreshment or entertainment" (such as pubs and theatres) do not qualify. The Merchandise Marks Act 1887 (50 & 51 Vict. c. 28) makes it illegal for companies to falsely claim that they have a royal warrant.

Following the death of Elizabeth II and the accession of Charles III in 2022, their royal warrants became void but remained valid for up to two years. Applications for new warrants from the King and Queen opened in May 2024, taking effect in 2025.

== Grantors ==
Current

- King Charles III (from 2024).
  - During his tenure as Prince of Wales, King Charles III granted 159 royal warrants, void but still usable for two years since his accession as king. In May 2024, King Charles III and Queen Camilla granted their first royal warrants of appointment of the new reign.
- Queen Camilla (from 2024).
- William, Prince of Wales (from 2026).
- Catherine, Princess of Wales (from 2026).

Former

- Queen Elizabeth II granted 686 royal warrants during her reign. Warrants that had not previously expired became void upon her death in September 2022. Warrant holders have two years to discontinue the use of her Royal Arms, but companies may apply for a warrant from King Charles III.
- Prince Philip, Duke of Edinburgh granted 38 royal warrants. As in the case of his wife, these became void upon his death in April 2021, with holders having two years to discontinue the use of his royal arms.
- King George VI
- Queen Elizabeth The Queen Mother granted many royal warrants until her death in 2002.
- King Edward VIII
- King George V
- Queen Mary
- King Edward VII
- Queen Alexandra
- Queen Victoria
- Prince Albert
- King William IV
- Queen Adelaide
- King George IV
- King George III
Royal Warrant by Appointment to HM The King

Royal Warrant by Appointment to HM The King in Scotland

Royal Warrant by Appointment to HM The Queen (since 2024)

== Current warrants ==
A downloadable list of current warrant holders and a searchable directory, kept up to date, are available from the Royal Warrant Holders Association.

== Partial table of warrants before the death of Elizabeth II ==
Several companies that had held Royal Warrants were no longer included on the Royal Warrant of Appointment list after the death of Queen Elizabeth II.

Company	Grantor	Trade	Legend on the warrant	Date of Validity	Date of warrant^{[A]}	Established	Reference
A&M Restoration and Conservation	The Queen, the Prince of Wales	Restoration and conservation of Interiors, Furniture	General Conservators	2019	2019?	2000	
Abbey England Ltd	The Queen	Saddlery, Leather Goods and Fashion	Saddlery Workshop Materials	2019		1832	
Abels Moving Services Ltd	The Queen	Removals and storage services	Removals and Storage Services	2019	1989	1958	
A.C Bacon Engineering Ltd	The Queen	Steel framed and agricultural buildings	Manufacturer of Steel-Framed Buildings	2019		1961	
A.C Cooper (Colour) Ltd	The Prince of Wales	Antiques, arts and conservation	Fine Art Photographers	2019		1918	
A&E Fire Equipment Ltd	The Prince of Wales	Fire prevention and security systems	Fire Fighting Equipment and Fire Detection Services	2019		1965	
A. Fulton Company Ltd	The Queen	Umbrella Manufacturers	Umbrella Manufacturers	2019		1956	
A. Hester Ltd	The Queen	Organic waste and environmental contractors	Supplier of Environmental Services	2019		1920	
A. J Charlton and Sons Ltd	The Queen	Gate Manufacturers	Gate Manufacturers	2019	2000	1903	
A.J Freezer Water Services Ltd	The Queen	Irrigation System Specialists & Suppliers	Irrigation Equipment Supplies	2019	2019?	2002	
Amerex Fire International Ltd	The Queen	Fire Protection Products	Fire Protection Products	2019	2009	1985	
A. Nash	The Queen	Broomsticks	Manufacturer of Besom Brooms and Pea Sticks	2019	1999	1700s	
Abaris Holdings Limited t/a Arthur Sanderson & Sons	The Queen	Soft Furnishings, Wallpapers, Paints and Fabrics	Suppliers of wallpapers, paints and fabrics	2019	1955	1860	
Absolute Floorcare	The Queen	Cleaning, maintenance and renovation services	Specialist Cleaning Services	2019	2018?	1989	
Adexchange Media Limited	The Queen	Supplier of Recorded Telephone Messages	Supplier of Recorded Telephone Messages	2019	2019?	2001	
Agma Ltd	The Queen	Cleaning & Hygiene Products	Cleaning & Hygiene Products	2019	2019?	1968	
Agri-Cycle	The Queen	Plastic Recycling, Farm Waste	Agricultural Waste Recycling	2019	2019?	2004	
Apex Lifts and escalators Ltd.	The Queen	Lifts	Manufacturers and Suppliers of Passenger Lifts	2019	2019?	1970	
Ainsworths Homeopathic Pharmacy	The Queen, the Prince of Wales, the Queen Mother (until 2002)	Homeopathic medicines and Bach flower remedies	Chemists	2019	1980	1980	
Airglaze Aviation GmbH	The Queen	Aircraft Servicing, Restoration	Supplier of Polish and Protective Coatings	2019	2019?	2017?	
AJ Lowther & Son Ltd	The Queen	Supplier of steel-framed buildings and cladding. Building & Maintenance	Supply & Refurbishment of Steel Framed Buildings	2019	2019?	1965	
Alan Scott Panel Beater & Paint Sprayer	The Queen	Vehicle Repairs, Panel Beater & Painter	Car / Vehicle Repairer	2019	2019?	1986	
Albert Amor Ltd	The Queen	Antiques, Art & Conservation	Suppliers of 18th Century Porcelains	2019	2019?	1998	
Albert E. Chapman Ltd	The Queen	Upholstering, fabric wall covering and tent-ceiling contractor. Curtain & Draping Manufacturer	Upholsterers and Soft Furnishers	2019	2019?	1930	
Alexandre of England 1988 Ltd	The Queen	Tailor of Suits, Shirts and Ties	Tailors	2019	2019?	1988	
All About Baths	The Queen	Bath Retailer & Maintenance	Bath Restorers	2019	2019?	1993	
Allan Coggin Furnishing Consultant	The Queen	Soft Furnishing Consultant	Soft Furnishing Consultant	2019	2019?	2019?	
Allen & Foxworthy Ltd	The Queen	Scaffolding Services	Scaffolding Contractor	2019	2019?	1998	
Allen & Page Ltd	The Prince of Wales	Horse Feed & Animal Welfare	Producer & Supplier of Organic & Non GM Animal Feeds	2019	2009	1936	
Allens Farm	The Queen	Supplier of Kent Cobnuts	Supplier of Kent Cobnuts	2019	2014	2014?	
Altis Maintenance Solutions Ltd.	The Queen	Managing and maintaining Altis alarm security systems.	Suppliers of Alarms, CCTV & Vault Locks	2022	2022	2022	
Amber Computing & IT Services Ltd	The Queen	Computer hardware, managed network support and website Consultancy Services	Suppliers of Computers, Software & Office Technology	2019	2009	1999	
Aquadition Ltd	The Queen	Water Treatment Services	Water Treatment Services	2019	2009	1972	
A.S. Handover Ltd	The Queen	Antiques, Art & Conservation	Brushes, Paints and Gilding Materials	2019	2019?	1949	
Asprey London Limited	The Prince of Wales	Luxury goods	Jewellers, Goldsmiths and Silversmiths	2019	1982	1781	
Aston Martin Lagonda Ltd	The Prince of Wales	Motor cars	Motor Car Manufacturer and Repairer	2019	1982	1913	
Astral Hygiene Ltd	The Queen	Cleaning Supplies	Suppliers of Cleaning & Hygiene Products	2022	2022	1992	
Autoglym Ltd	The Queen, the Prince of Wales	Transportation and vehicles	Supplier of Car Care Products	2019	1991	1965	
A.W Hainsworth & Sons	The Queen	Household Fabrics and Clothing	Manufacturers of Furnishing Fabrics	2019		1783	
Axminster Carpet Ltd	The Queen	Homes & Household Goods	Carpet manufacturer	2019	2012	1755	
Bacardi-Martini Ltd	The Queen	Alcoholic Drinks	Martini Vermouth	2019		1863	
J. Barbour and Sons	The Queen, the Duke of Edinburgh (until 2021), the Prince of Wales	Clothing and Outerwear	Manufacturers of Waterproof and Protective Clothing	2019	1974	1894	
Barnard & Westwood Ltd	The Queen, the Prince of Wales	Printing and Bookbinding	Printers and Bookbinders	2019	Queen: 1986, Prince of Wales: 2012	1921	
I & J Bannerman Ltd	The Prince of Wales	Garden Design	Garden Designers and Builders	1997			
Bell Decorating Group Ltd	The Queen	Painters and Decorators	Painters and Decorators	2025	2009	1988	
Bendicks (Mayfair) Ltd	The Queen	Chocolate goods	Manufacturers of chocolates	2019	1962	1930	
Benney (or House of Benney)	The Queen, the Duke of Edinburgh (until 2021), the Prince of Wales	Jewellers, Gold/Silversmiths & Clockmakers	Gold & Silversmiths	2019			
Bentley & Skinner (Bond Street Jewellers) LTD	The Queen, the Duke of Edinburgh (until 2021), the Prince of Wales	Jewellers, Gold/Silversmiths & Clockmakers	Gold & Silversmiths	????			
Berry Brothers & Rudd	The Queen, the Prince of Wales	Wine and Spirits	Wine & Spirits Merchants	2019	1903	1698	
BJS Company Ltd	The Queen	Silverware, electroplaters & electrofomers	Electroformers, Electroplaters & Silversmiths	2023	1992	1945	
A.J Freezer Water Services Ltd	The Queen	Irrigation System Specialists & Suppliers	Irrigation Equipment Supplies	2019	2019?	2002	
Bluebird Buses Ltd t/a Stagecoach Bluebird	The Queen	Bus and Coach Services	Bus and Coach Services	2019	1996	1985	
Boots UK Ltd	The Queen	Health & Beauty	Manufacturers and retailers of health and beauty products	2019		1849	
Brintons Carpet Ltd	The Queen	Homes and household goods	Carpet manufacturer	2019	1958	1783	
British Sugar Plc	The Queen	Food & Drink	Manufacturers of sugar	2019		1936	
Britvic Soft Drinks Ltd	The Queen	Food & Drink	Manufacturers of fruit juices and soft drinks	2019		1938	
BT	The Queen	Business & Technology	Suppliers of communications, broadband and networked services	2019		1969	
Burberry Limited	The Queen, the Prince of Wales	Clothing & Accessories	Weatherproofers & Outfitters	2019	1955	1856	
Calor Gas Ltd	The Queen, the Duke of Edinburgh (until 2021)	Building & Maintenance	Suppliers of liquefied petroleum gas	2019		1935	
Carluccio's Ltd	The Prince of Wales	Food & Drink	Supplier of Italian food and truffles	2019		1991	
Mr. Ian Carmichael	The Queen	Hairdressing	Hairdresser	2019	2016		
Cartier Ltd	The Prince of Wales	Jewellers, Gold/Silversmiths/Clockmakers	Jewellers and Goldsmiths	2019		1847	
Champagne Bollinger S.A.	The Queen	Food & Drink	Purveyors of Champagne	2019	1884	1829	
Champagne GH Mumm & Cie	The Queen	Food & Drink	Purveyors of Champagne	2019		1827	
Champagne Krug	The Queen	Food & Drink	Purveyors of Champagne	2019		1843	
Champagne Lanson Pére Et Fils	The Queen	Food & Drink	Purveyors of Champagne	2019		1760	
Champagne Laurent-Perrier	The Prince of Wales	Food & Drink	Purveyors of Champagne	2019		1812	
Champagne Louis Roederer	The Queen	Food & Drink	Purveyors of Champagne	2019		1776	
Champagne Moet & Chandon	The Queen	Food & Drink	Purveyors of Champagne	2019		1743	
Champagne Veuve Clicquot	The Queen	Food & Drink	Purveyors of Champagne	2019		1772	
Charbonnel et Walker Ltd	The Queen	Food & Drink	Chocolate Manufacturers	2019		1875	
Changeworks Recycling	The Queen	Recycling and Waste Management	Waste Management Services	2021	2017	2001	
Clarins (UK) Ltd	The Queen	Health & Beauty	Manufacturers of Skin Care and Cosmetics	2019		1954	
Clow Group Ltd	The Queen	Building & Maintenance	Manufacturers of Access Equipment	2019	2008	1913	
Computer Aid International	The Queen	Business & Technology	Computer recycling services	2019		1998	
Connevans Limited	The Queen	Manufacturers and Suppliers of Audio Equipment	Manufacturers and Suppliers of Audio Equipment	2019	2016	1961	
Corgi Hosiery Limited	The Prince of Wales	Clothing & Accessories	Knitwear & Hosiery Manufacturers	2019		1892	
Cornelia James Ltd	The Queen	Clothing & Accessories	Glove Manufacturer	2019	1979	1946	
Coventry Scaffolding Ltd.	The Queen	Building & Maintenance	Scaffolding Contractor	2019	2005	1950	
Crown Paints	The Queen	Building & Maintenance	Manufacturers of Paint	2019		1777	
Daks Ltd	The Queen, the Duke of Edinburgh (until 2021), the Prince of Wales	Clothing, footwear and accessories	Outfitters	2019	1956	1894	
Darville & Son Ltd	The Queen	Groceries, Tea	Grocers	2019	1946	1860	
EFL Ltd	The Queen	Building & Maintenance	Lead Roofers	2019	2015	1995	
D & F McCarthy Ltd	The Queen, the Prince of Wales, the Queen Mother (until 2002)	Fresh Fruit & Vegetables	Wholesalers		1970	1877	
First Option Software Ltd	The Queen	Suppliers of Software Services	Software Developers	2019	2016	1989	
Fisher & Donaldson	The Queen	Bread, Cakes and Confectionery	Bakers	2019	2011	1919	
Flogas Britain Ltd	The Queen	Building & Maintenance	Suppliers of LPG	2019			
Flying Colours Flagmakers	The Queen	Manufacturers and Suppliers of Flags and Banners	Flag Manufacturer	2007	2007	1994	
Fortnum & Mason PLC	The Queen, the Prince of Wales	Groceries and provisions	Grocers & Provision Merchants, Tea Merchants	2019	1955	1707	
Foodspeed Ltd	The Queen	Dairy	Fresh Milk and Dairy Products	2019	2012	2000	
G.B Kent & Sons	The Queen	Brushmaking	Manufacturers of brushes / hairbrushes	2019	1832	1777	
G. Collins & Sons	The Queen	Jeweller	Jewellers, Gold/Silversmiths & Clockmakers	2005	2005	1985	
G Ettinger Ltd.	The Prince of Wales	Leathergoods	Manufacturers of Leathergoods	2019	1996	1934	
Garrard & Co. Ltd	The Prince of Wales	Jewellery	Jewellers, Goldsmiths and Silversmiths	2019	1989	1735	
Gieves & Hawkes Ltd	The Queen, the Duke of Edinburgh (until 2021), the Prince of Wales	Clothing, footwear and accessories	Naval Tailors and Outfitters	2019	1809	1771	
Gilbert Gilkes & Gordon	The Queen	Building & Maintenance	Water Turbine Engineers	2021		1853	
Gordon Bell Pianos	The Queen	Piano servicing	Piano tuning and servicing		2009	2003	
The Goring	The Queen	Hotel	Hospitality Services	2019	2013	1910	
Halcyon Days	The Queen, the Duke of Edinburgh (until 2021), the Prince of Wales	Luxury gifts and accessories	Suppliers of Objets d'Art	2019	1978	1950	
Hamilton & Inches Ltd	The Queen	Jewellery	Silversmiths & Clock Specialists	2019	1955	1866	
Hand & Lock	The Queen	Embroidery	Embroiderers and Suppliers of Military Accoutrements	2019	2019	1767	
Hayter Ltd.	The Queen	Horticulture & Gardening Services	Manufacturers of Horticultural Machinery	2019	1960	1946	
Hobs Reprographics	The Queen	Reprographic services	Reprographic services	2019	2003	1969	
House of Fraser Ltd t/a House of Fraser & Jenners	The Queen	Clothing & Accessories	Outfitters and Suppliers of Household Goods	2019	?	1849	
Howden Joinery Ltd	The Queen	Homes & Household Goods	Supplier of Fitted Kitchens	2019	2015	1995	
H.J Heinz Foods UK Limited	The Queen	Condiment	HP Sauces, Beans, Sauce, Pasta	2019	1951	1875	
Hull Cartridge Company Ltd.	The Queen	Sports, Leisure & Entertainment	Manufacturers of Shotgun Cartridges	2019	1992	1947	
Jaguar Land Rover Limited	The Queen, the Duke of Edinburgh (until 2021), the Prince of Wales	Premium & Luxury Automobiles	Manufacturers of Motor Vehicles	2019	1951	1922	
J. Floris Ltd	The Queen, the Prince of Wales	Perfumes and toiletries	Perfumers, Manufacturers of Toilet Preparations	2019	1971	1730	
J Hewit & Sons Ltd	The Queen	Manufacturers of leather, bookbinding material retailer	Manufacturers of Leather	2019	1975	1849?	
Jack Barclay ltd	The Queen	Bentley motor car dealership, servicing and repair	Service and Repair of Motor Vehicles	2019	2014	1927	
James Lock & Co. Ltd	The Prince of Wales, the Duke of Edinburgh (until 2021)	Hatmaking	Hatters	2019	1956	1676	
James Purdey & Sons Ltd	The Queen, the Prince of Wales, the Duke of Edinburgh (until 2021)	Sports, hobbies and entertainment	Gun Makers	2019	1868	1814	
James White Drinks Ltd.	The Queen	Food & Drink	Tomato juice	2019	2002		
Jeeves of Belgravia	The Prince of Wales	Cleaning Products and Services	Dry Cleaners	2019		1969	
John Bell & Croyden	The Queen	Pharmacy	Pharmacists	2019	1958	1798	
Joel & Son Fabrics	The Queen	Suppliers of fabrics	Suppliers of Fabrics and Textiles	2019	1998	1979	
John Lobb Ltd	The Prince of Wales, the Duke of Edinburgh (until 2021)	Clothing, footwear and accessories	Bootmakers	2019	1956	1856	
Judges Choice Petfood Ltd	The Queen	Dog Food	Producer & Supplier of Animal Feeds	2019	1991	1985	
Kellogg's Marketing & Sales Co. (UK) Ltd.	The Queen, the Prince of Wales	Food & Drink	Purveyors of Cereals	2019	Unknown, likely since beginning of UK operations	1906	
Kinloch Anderson Ltd	The Queen, the Duke of Edinburgh (until 2021), the Prince of Wales	Clothing, footwear and accessories	Tailors and Kiltmakers	2019	1934	1868	
Laphroaig distillery	The Prince of Wales	Scotch Whisky	Distillers and Suppliers of Single Malt Scotch Whisky		1994	1815	
Launer London Ltd.	The Queen	Bags and Accessories	Handbags and Leather goods		1968	1940	
Loake Bros Ltd	The Queen	Shoemakers	Manufacturer of Men's Footwear		2007	1880	
Maldon Crystal Salt Company	The Queen	Food & Drink	Purveyors of Sea Salt		2012	1882	
Mappin & Webb	The Queen, the Duke of Edinburgh (until 2021)	Fine Jewelry, Watches and Luxury Goods	Jewellers, Goldsmiths & Silversmiths		1897	1775	
McIlhenny Company	The Queen	Condiments	Supplier of Tabasco sauce		2009	1868	
McFarlane Telfer	The Queen	Maintenance	Catering & Refrigeration Engineers		2011	1992	
Musk's Ltd	The Queen	Sausages	Supplier of Musks Sausages		2005	1884	
Musto	The Queen, the Duke of Edinburgh (until 2021)	Performance activewear	Manufacturers of outdoor clothing		2010	1980	
Mercedes-Benz UK	The King	Car manufacturer			2025	1926	
Mylands	The Queen	Manufacturer of paints	Manufacturer of French Polishes, Stains and Wax Polishes		1985	1884	
Nestlé UK	The Queen	Confectioner	Manufacturers of Nestlé Products			1905	
Packexe Ltd	The Queen	Self Adhesive Protection Film	Manufacturers of Self Adhesive Protection Film		2016	1989	
Partridges London	The Queen	Grocers	Food and Drink	2021	1994	1972	
Paxton & Whitfield	The Queen, the Prince of Wales	Food & Drink	London Cheesemongers	1997	1850	1797	
Peter Jones	The Prince of Wales, the Duke of Edinburgh (until 2021)	Furnishings and linens	Draper and Furnisher		1987	1877	
Price's Patent Candles	The Queen	Candles	Manufacturers of Candles	2020	1850	1830	
Procter & Gamble	The Prince of Wales	Consumer products	Manufacturers of Soap & Detergents		1965	1837	
P Bowyer Associates Ltd (Dyno Rod East Anglia)	The Queen	Reactive and planned drainage solutions	Drainage Specialist	2019		1973	
Radiocoms Systems Ltd	The Queen	Voice and Data Communication Solutions	Supplier of Radio Communications Equipment and Services		2017	1973	
Richer Sounds	The Prince of Wales	Homes & Household Goods	Supplier of Consumer Electronic Products		2011	1978	
Samsung Electronics (UK) Limited	The Queen, the Duke of Edinburgh (until 2021), the Prince of Wales	Electronics	Supplier of Consumer Electronic Products		2012	1969	
Sandicliffe Garage Ltd	The Queen	Motor Vehicle Dealership	Suppliers of Motor Horse Boxes and Automobile Engineers		1978	1948	
Scan Computers International Ltd	The Queen	High Performance Personal Computers & IT Hardware	High Performance Personal Computers & IT Hardware		2014	1987	
Stanley Gibbons	The Queen	Antiques, Art & Conservation	Philatelists			1856	
Schweppes Holdings Ltd (subsidiary of Coca-Cola UK)	The Queen	Soft drinks and Mixers	Manufacturers of Schweppes and Roses soft drinks		unknown, likely since 19th century	1783	
Shepherd Neame Ltd.	The Prince of Wales	Beers	Specialist Products		1998	1698	
Sleepeezee Ltd	The Queen	Bed and Mattress manufacturer	Bedding Manufacturers			1924	
Skyman Sacks & Bags Ltd	The Queen	Suppliers of Sacks & Bags				1976	
Spink & Son Ltd	The Queen, the Duke of Edinburgh (until 2021)	Medals and insignia	Medallists		1900	1666	
Swarovski Optik	The Queen	Optical lenses	Suppliers of Binoculars		2009	1949	
Taylors of Harrogate	The Prince of Wales	Tea and Coffee	Suppliers of Beverages		2009	1886	
Temple Bookbinders Oxford	The Queen	Hand Bookbinder	Hand Bookbinder		??	??	
The General Trading Company (Mayfair) Ltd	The Queen, the Prince of Wales, the Duke of Edinburgh (until 2021)	Fancy Goods	Suppliers of Fancy Goods		1963	1920	
The Mayfair Cleaning Company	The Queen	Office and Commercial Cleaning	Cleaning Services		2000	1910	
The Ritz	The Prince of Wales	Hotel	Banqueting and Catering Services		2002	1906	
Thomas Lyte	The Queen	Luxury Goods	Jewellers, Goldsmiths and Silversmiths		2015	2007	
Toye, Kenning & Spencer	The Queen	Gold and Silver Laces, Insignia and Embroidery	Suppliers of Gold and Silver Laces, Insignia and Embroidery		1956	1685	
Tom Smith	The Queen	Christmas Crackers, Wrapping Paper	Suppliers of Christmas Crackers and Wrapping Paper		1964	1847	
Thomas Fattorini Ltd	The Queen	Designers and makers of Civic Insignia, National Honours & Awards, Trophies, Medals, Ceremonial swords and Name badges	Manufacturers of Insignia, Honours & Awards		2008	1827	
Turnbull & Asser	The Prince of Wales	Luxury Bespoke Men's Clothier	Shirtmakers		1980	1886	
Twinings & Co. Limited London	The Queen	Tea	Tea and Coffee Merchants		1837	1706	
Unitech Complete Computing	The Queen, the Prince of Wales, the Duke of Edinburgh (until 2021)	Computing systems	Software Developers			1996	
United Biscuits (UK) Ltd	The Queen	Food & Drink	Biscuit Manufacturers				
Unilever UK Ltd	The Queen	Food, Home and Personal Care Products	Food and Household Products		2016	1929	
Universal Lighting Services Ltd	The Queen	Suppliers of Decorative Lighting	Lighting Suppliers		2009	1970	
Vale Brothers Ltd	The Queen	Agriculture & Animal Welfare	Manufacturers of Horse Grooming Brushes			1786	
Waitrose	The Queen, the Prince of Wales	Food & Drink	Grocer and Wine & Spirit Merchant		2003	1904	
Walkers Shortbread Ltd	The Queen	Food & Drink	Supplier of Oatcakes and Shortbread		2017	1898	
Wartski	The Queen, the Prince of Wales	Jewellers, Gold, Silversmiths, Clockmakers	Jewellers			1865	
Weetabix Limited	The Queen	Breakfast Cereals	Manufacturer of Breakfast Cereals			1932	
Wilkins (Henley) Ltd T/A Palmers of Windsor and Maidenhead	The Queen	Transport and Storage	Removals and Storage Contractors	2022	2022	1880	
Wilkin & Sons Ltd	The Queen	Preserves, Puddings and Tea	Purveyors of Tiptree Products		1911	1885	
William & Son	The Queen	Jewellers, Gold/Silversmiths & Clockmakers	Goldsmiths and Silversmiths		2009	1999	
T&R Williamson Ltd, a division of Thomas Howse Ltd	The Queen	Manufacturer of Specialist Coatings and Paints	Varnish, Paint and Enamel Manufacturers		2011	1775	
Worcester Bosch	The Queen	Manufacturer of heating and hot-water goods	Boiler Manufacturer	2019	2009	1962	
Yardley of London	The Queen, the Prince of Wales	Manufacturers of Toiletry Products	Manufacturers of Toiletry Products		1955	1770	
Montala T/A ResourceSpace	The Queen	Digital Asset Management	Software Developers		2018	2005	
Xerox Ltd	The Prince of Wales	Print and digital document equipment	Manufacturers and Suppliers of Xerographic Copying Equipment			1906	
Zone Creations	The Queen	Furniture design	Manufacturers of Display Products			1999	
R.E. Tricker Ltd	The Prince of Wales	Shoemakers	Shoe Manufacturers		1989	1829	
Johnnie Walker	King George V	Scotch Whisky	Scotch Whisky Distillers		1934		

^{A} Date of first Royal Warrant if multiple warrants awarded

== Partial table of warrants removed or void in 2024 ==
Company	Grantor	Trade	Legend on the warrant	Removed	Date of warrant^{[A]}	Established	Reference
Cadbury UK Ltd	Queen Elizabeth II	Chocolatiers	Chocolate manufacturers	2024	1969	1831	
Truefitt & Hill	The Duke of Edinburgh	Cosmetics, health and beauty	Hairdressers	2021 (Void upon death of Grantor)	1998	1805	
Penhaligon's Ltd	The Duke of Edinburgh	Cosmetics, health and beauty	Manufacturers of Toilet Requisites	2021 (Void upon death of Grantor)	1903	1860	
Lyle & Scott Limited	The Duke of Edinburgh	Clothing, footwear and accessories	Manufacturers of Underwear and Knitwear	2021 (Void upon death of Grantor)	1975	1874	
Kent Haste Latcher Ltd	The Duke of Edinburgh	Clothing, footwear and accessories	Tailors	2021 (Void upon death of Grantor)	2010	1986	
Johns & Pegg	The Duke of Edinburgh	Clothing, footwear and accessories	Military Tailors	2021 (Void upon death of Grantor)	1956	1803	
Hunter Boot Ltd	The Duke of Edinburgh	Clothing, footwear and accessories	Suppliers of Waterproof Footwear	2021 (Void upon death of Grantor)	1977	1856	
Frank Smythson Limited	The Duke of Edinburgh	Stationery, printing and calligraphy	Supplier of Leathergoods	2021 (Void upon death of Grantor)	1964	1887	
Firmin & Sons Ltd	The Duke of Edinburgh	Clothing, footwear and accessories	Manufacturer of Insignia, Buttons and Accessories	2021 (Void upon death of Grantor)	2005	1655	
Ede & Ravenscroft Ltd	The Duke of Edinburgh	Clothing, footwear and accessories	Robe Makers	2021 (Void upon death of Grantor)	1963	1689	
Boots Opticians	The Duke of Edinburgh	Health & Beauty	Ophthalmic and dispensing optician stores	2021 (Void upon death of Grantor)		1983	
Blossom & Browne's Sycamore	The Duke of Edinburgh	Household goods and cleaning	Launderers and Dry Cleaners	2021 (Void upon death of Grantor)	1997	1888	
Autoscan Ltd	The Duke of Edinburgh	Stationery, printing and calligraphy	Manufacturers of Power Filing Systems	2021 (Void upon death of Grantor)	1973	1967	
Artistic Iron Products Ltd	The Duke of Edinburgh	Transportation and vehicles	Carriage Builder	2021 (Void upon death of Grantor)	1979	1962	
Anthony Buckley & Constantine Ltd	The Duke of Edinburgh	Photography	Photographer	2021 (Void upon death of Grantor)	2005	1951	
Atco (then subsidiary of Robert Bosch GmbH)	The Queen, the Prince of Wales	Lawn mowers		2011?	1930	1901	
ATS Euromaster Ltd	The Queen	Tyre retailing and vehicle servicing		2019?		1965	
Aubury Allen Ltd	The Queen	Butcher	Fine Meat, Game and Poultry	2019?		1933	
Austin Reed Group Ltd	The Queen, the Prince of Wales	Clothing, footwear and accessories	Outfitters		1994	1900	
Barrow & Gale Limited	The Queen	Leather goods	Manufacturers of Royal Maundy Purses		1968	1750	
Carr's	The Queen	Food	Biscuits and Crackers	2012	1841	1831	
Daimler Company (now a subsidiary of Jaguar Cars)	The Queen	Luxury Automobiles	Motor Car Manufacturers	2008? (end of Daimler production)	1902	1896	
Datacraft Design Limited	The Queen	Computers, software and office technology	Manufacturers and Suppliers of Space Management Software	2019?	2008	1994	
Dollond & Aitchison	The Duke of Edinburgh	Opticians	Dispensing Opticians	(2009 now trading as Boots Opticians)	1956	1750	
Edward Goodyear Ltd	The Duke of Edinburgh	Horticulture	Florist	2019?	1978	1879	
The Express Lift Company Ltd. (then a subsidiary of the General Electric Company)	The Queen	Lifts	Suppliers of Passenger Lifts	1997	1990	1917	
Gallaher Group and subsidiaries	The Queen	Tobacco products		1999	1878	1873	
Harrods	The Queen, the Prince of Wales, the Duke of Edinburgh	Department store		2000	1910	1834	
The Hoover Company	The Queen	Vacuum cleaners	Suppliers of Vacuum Cleaners	2004	1956	1908	
Gallyon Gun & Rifle Makers	The Queen	Rifles	Gunmakers	N/A	1946	1784	
Lillywhites	The Queen	department store	sports outfitters	2003			
C.T. Maine Ltd Saint Helier Jersey	King George V	Jewellers and silversmiths	suppliers of jewellery	2009	c.1921	1896	
JH & RR Mundy (Roofing Supplies) Ltd	The Queen	Building & Maintentance	Roofing Contractors	2019?		1968	
Idris Ltd	The Queen	Drinks	Top Deck Shandy	199x	-	1965	London Gazette 1965-01-01
Rigby & Peller	The Queen	Corsetiere & Lingerie Specialists	Corsetiere & Intimates	2017	1960	1939	
Rootes Group (Rootes Motors Limited)	The Queen	Motor Vehicle Manufacturers	Motor Vehicle Manufacturers				
Trivector Systems International Ltd	The Duke of Edinburgh	Computers	Computer Supplier	199x	1985	1974	London Gazette 1989-01-01
Caleys	The Queen	Department store	Supplier of household and fancy goods and millinery		2006	1823	
Volkswagen Group UK Ltd	The Queen	Transport & Storage	Motor Vehicle Manufacturers	2015		1937	
Swan and Edgar	The King	Department Store	Drapers	1904	1911	1904	
Wren's Super Wax Shoe Polish	The Queen, King George VI	Shoe Polish			1936	1889	

^{A} Date of first Royal Warrant if multiple warrants awarded
