= John Donald (jewellery designer) =

British jeweller and designer (1928–2023)

John Donald (6 December 1928 – 21 September 2023) was a British jeweller and designer whose work was strongly identified in the 1960s and 1970s in London. Princess Margaret and the Queen Mother purchased works by Donald in the 1960s, having been introduced to him by Antony Armstrong-Jones, 1st Earl of Snowdon. His work is considered to capture the late 20th century ideals of glamour and modernity.

Examples of Donald's work are held in the collections of the Museum of Scotland in Edinburgh, Victoria & Albert Museum in London, and the collection of the Worshipful Company of Goldsmiths.

== Biography ==
John Donald was born on 6 December, 1928 to a golfing father and a socially ambitious mother. He studied graphic design at Farnham, attending art college as a compromise between sport and university. In 1952, he was offered the chance to enrol in the Metalwork Department of the Royal College of Art, which he accepted in order to experience London.

At college, Donald joined a group of ex-servicemen, often staying in the studio late into the night. He lived with fellow metalwork students Robert Welch and Gerald Benney in Chelsea. All three of them later became famous for their silver and jewellery designs.

Donald graduated in 1955, and left a year later with his degree. However, it was several years before he established himself as a jeweller; in the meantime, he had been forced to support himself through a combination of male modelling and industrial design. In 1960, the proceeds from designing luggage and National Health spectacles allowed him to buy his own studio. A year later, he entered five pieces in the seminal International Exhibition of Modern Jewellery 1890–1961, held at Goldsmiths' Hall. By 1964, his patrons included Princess Margaret and the Queen Mother.

Donald's designs caught the mood of freedom and excitement which swept Britain during the 1960s. Using simple materials such as gold rod and uncut crystal, he created unconventional pieces that deviated from the restrictive traditional shapes and styles of earlier jewels. He was one of a small group of craftsmen whose radical entries to the International Exhibition ushered in a new era of modern jewellery. Characterised by adventurous forms and textures, the movement deliberately avoided showcasing precious materials or artificially imposing a subject. The sponsors of the exhibition proclaimed that it was "as uninhibited as modern sculpture, or fashion; individual, imaginative and smart."

Donald later established a business and gained an international reputation.

== Experimental techniques ==
Donald's jewellery is characterised by its unusual forms and textures, which has been described as having a "dynamic energy". He started experimenting with gold and precious stones during the late 1950s, and financial difficulties during that time forced him to take creative new directions. In 1957, he bought a quantity of gold rods and chenier, a small-bore tubing supplied directly by bullion merchants. It was some of the only gold he could afford. By cutting it into angled lengths or fusing tiny cross-sections, he was able to create dramatic geometric patterns. The natural form of crystals was another source of inspiration. Less expensive and more diverse than conventional jewels, their planes and striations were echoed in his textured surfaces. One of his most distinctive motifs—the cube—directly developed from his use of square-shaped iron pyrites.

The experimentation continued when he moved into his own studio in 1960, and it was here that he created another important motif: the bead and cup. Pouring molten gold into cold water, he discovered that it divided into small beads, some of which caught bubbles of air and cooled into hollow cups. The beads were soldered together to create a complex surface of contrasting convex and concave shapes. He later cast bead and cup sections, enabling him to use them in larger scale designs.

The jewellery made with these techniques uses simple parts to create detailed, modern designs. These pieces are often noted for their visual appearance, despite being made from basic materials.

== Crowns, shadows and the concern for texture ==
One of Donald's signature techniques was the striking drum or crown mount. Framed by a protective basket of textured gold, gems are set at the end of tiny rods to form an array of openwork jewellery. He said that the method was developed as a way to make up for his lack of conventional skills; however, fixing the narrow rods into their tiny screw-holes requires a high level of technical expertise. The mounts allow a delicacy of setting that is extremely difficult to achieve with more traditional designs.

The drums themselves reveal other Donald trademarks: textured 'nugget flakes' and 'wavy rods'. Continuing his experiments with immersing molten metal in water, he discovered he could use this process to produce small flakes whose nugget-like surfaces gave the gold an almost organic appearance. These could be used in a variety of forms, but they were especially effective when combined with the sinuous shapes of melted gold rod. Melting was also used to give other gold elements a fluid feel, especially in the "nugget-edged" apertures which appear in some of his pieces.

All these methods highlight Donald's preoccupation with the effects of texture of light. Like many of his contemporaries, he rejected the monotony of traditional polished surfaces. Instead, his work contrasts the glow of uneven metal with polished sheens and gemstones, the shadows cast by his three-dimensional forms adding an extra element of drama.

== Jewellery business ==
From the early 1960s, Donald's reputation grew rapidly. His work found favour with women of fashion as well as critics. He married in 1962, and later had two young children living above his Bayswater workshop.

By the middle of the decade, both Donald's business and his family were starting to outgrow his small Bayswater workshop and premises above it, and so he began searching for a new studio. The site he eventually chose was 120 Cheapside, a small shop at the front of the then-new Schroder's Bank building. This was a significant choice; by moving to a shop in the City he was opting not only to independently retail his work, but to do so away from the traditional hub of the West End. In 1968 he opened a small gallery and workshop, delighting his landlords by bringing a working jeweller back to the Elizabethan 'Goldsmiths Row'.

The years that followed saw his business grow exponentially. He opened one retail shop in Bond Street in 1971, and another in Richmond in 1973. The former enterprise was a partnership with Tecla pearls; although only lasting a little over a year, it still allowed him to develop his use of the gems. The outlets enabled Donald to bring his designs to an audience of more ordinary clients in addition to his wealthy patrons from the banking and aristocratic worlds.

== Eastern colour and old-fashioned influences ==
Donald travelled overseas right from the start of his career, building up his international profile by exhibiting and selling new work in Europe, America and Japan. However, his most important links were with the Middle East, and it was this region which inspired many of his designs in the late 20th century.

Donald made his first visit there in 1969, holding a small exhibition at the Sheraton Hotel in Kuwait. It was an immediate success and he returned in 1971, when his three-week stay earned him enough money to see him through the crippling economic downturn which marked the beginning of that year. The intense sunlight of the Middle East drove him to be much bolder with his use of colours. The Islamic tiles and decorations he encountered on these trips were another source of new ideas.

Donald's work was also inspired by Victorian jewellery. As a young student at the Royal College of Art, he spent time looking at the Victoria and Albert Museum's extensive collection of 19th century jewels. Their elegant natural shapes and attention to detail influenced many of his pieces, especially those which have movable or interchangeable parts.

== Brooches ==
Brooches were the first pieces of jewellery made by Donald using his innovative new techniques, and they launched his career as an artist-jeweller, several examples representing his work at the 1961 International Exhibition of Modern Jewellery. The straight forward way in which brooches are worn gives maximum scope for experimentation, and as a result he has always had a special fondness for this versatile ornament.

Such creative freedom means that some of his most important ideas can be traced through brooch design. Growth forms, including minute organisms and minerals have been a theme informing his work from the very beginning. The young Donald was one of the first jewellers to use uncut crystals, studying specimens in the Natural History Museum. The dramatic, baroque expression of many examples reveals a wholly different influence: a travelling scholarship he took to Italy in 1955. Here he absorbed the energy and drama of the country's treasures.

But no matter how diverse, his brooches (like all his work) are united by two overarching concerns. The first is for the balance and integrity of his designs. According to Donald 'all stones, however valuable, however beautiful, must be subordinate to design'. The second is for their relationship with the wearer. He has always maintained that 'I am very aware that my pieces are to be worn, and when working on commissioned objects, always take into account, not only the appearance but the personality of the wearer'.

== Out of the city and into the future ==
For 37 years the Cheapside shop occupied a unique place in London. The modern financial centre has its roots in the many goldsmiths' workshops which populated the area in past centuries, and as the only working goldsmith within the City's boundaries, Donald provided an important link with these historic origins.

This significant position was cemented by his very traditional role in creating pieces for the City's Livery' Companies. Donald designed official regalia from the beginning of his career, producing his very first badge in 1956 whilst still a student at the Royal College of Art. His first significant commission as an independent jeweller was to make three Warden's Badges for the Goldsmiths' Company. He was awarded the project in 1960, after winning a limited competition whose brief was to combine contemporary design with the Company's ancient heraldic motifs. From here, he made over 120 official badges. They were known not only for their aesthetic appeal, but their robustness, which had been necessary given the active nature of the officials' work.

London lost its last goldsmith in 2005, when re-development led to the closure of the 120 Cheapside shop. Donald continued working during semi-retirement on commissioned pieces. He produced items by hand and experimented as a piece was made.

== Death ==
John Donald died on 21 September 2023 at the age of 94.
