= Firmino =

Firmino is a surname and given name, the Portuguese form of Firmin.

== Surname ==
- Cândido Firmino de Mello-Leitão (1886–1948), Brazilian zoologist
- Émerson Luiz Firmino (born 1973), Brazilian footballer
- Roberto Firmino (born 1991), Brazilian footballer

== Given name or maternal family name ==
- Osvaldinho (footballer, born 1945), real name Firmino Baleizão da Graça Sardinha, Portuguese footballer
- Diego Monar Firmino Martins (born 1989), Brazilian footballer
- Leandro Firmino da Hora (born 1978), Brazilian actor
- Paul J. F. Lusaka (1935–1996), Zambian politician and diplomat
- Samuel Firmino de Jesus (born 1986), Brazilian footballer
- Firmino Pires Ferreira (1848–1930), Brazilian military and politician

== See also ==
- Firmino Alves, a municipality in the state of Bahia in Brazil
- Senador Firmino, a Brazilian municipality located in the state of Minas Gerais
