= Fermín (name) =

Fermín or Fermin is a surname and masculine given name, the Spanish form of Firmin. Notable people include:

== Surname ==
- Anna Fermin, American folk/country singer and songwriter
- Cristy Fermin (born 1956), Filipino talk show host.
- Freddy Fermín (born 1995), Venezuelan baseball player
- Iamdra Fermín (born 1984), Dominican TV hostess, emcee, and actress
- José Fermín (infielder) (born 1999), Dominican baseball player
- José Fermín (pitcher) (born 2001), Dominican baseball player

== Given name ==
- Fermín Aldeguer (born 2005), Spanish motorcycle racer
- Fermín Arango (born 1874), Spanish-Argentine painter
- Fermín Cacho (born 1969), Spanish track and field athlete
- Fermín Francisco de Carvajal-Vargas (born 1722), 1st Duke of San Carlos and Grandee of Spain
- Fermín Zanón Cervera (born 1875), Spanish zoologist
- Fermín IV (born 1974), Mexican rapper & pastor
- Fermín López (born 2003), Spanish footballer
- Fermin Rocker (born 1907), British painter and book illustrator
- Fermín Salvochea (born 1842), former mayor of the city of Cádiz
- Fermín Tangüis (born 1851), Puerto Rican businessman, agriculturist and scientist
- Fermín Toro (born 1806), Venezuelan humanist, politician, diplomat and author
- Fermín Trueba (born 1914), former Spanish cyclist
- Fermín Uriarte (1902–1972), Uruguayan footballer
