= 1888 Cup =

- Sport: Rugby union
- Instituted: 2021; 5 years ago
- Holders: Argentina (2025)

The 1888 Cup is a men's rugby union trophy contested ahead of each quadrennial British & Irish Lions tour. First played for in a 2021 warm-up fixture for the British & Irish Lions' tour of South Africa, the trophy is challenged for between the Lions and a nation outside the traditional touring trio of Australia, New Zealand, and South Africa. The trophy is named after the year (1888) of the first British & Irish Lions tour to Australia and New Zealand. The trophy was designed and crafted by Thomas Lyte, a renowned British silversmith and goldsmith and royal warrant holder to King Charles III.

As of 2025 the holders are Argentina, whom defeated the British & Irish Lions 24–28 at the Aviva Stadium, Dublin in June 2025.

== Results ==
No.	Tour	Date	Venue	Opponent	Score	Winner	Attendance	Ref.
1	South Africa	26 June 2021	Murrayfield Stadium, Edinburgh (Scotland)	Japan	28–10	British & Irish Lions	16,500 (Note: Due to COVID-19 pandemic, stadium seated events in Scotland were allowed with restrictions on attendance numbers.)	
2	Australia	20 June 2025	Aviva Stadium, Dublin (Ireland)	Argentina	24–28	Argentina	51,700	
