= A. Nash =

British manufacturer of brooms

- Industry: Broomsticks; Besom Brooms; Pea Sticks
- Founded: 1700s
- Key people: Arthur Nash (to 2004); Bradley Nash
- Website: besombrooms.com

A. Nash is a British manufacturer of broomsticks, besom brooms and pea sticks, based in Tadley, Hampshire, England. The company holds a Royal Warrant as a supplier to King Charles III.

== History ==
Founded in the 18th century, the Nash family have been making brooms for over 700 years, with Bradley Nash the current royal broomsquire – a title he inherited from his father, Arthur Nash who died in 2004.

A. Nash supplies the King's household with approximately 120 besoms a year, all manufactured from the company's base in Tadley.
