= Listed buildings in Blean =

Civil Parish in Kent, England

Blean is a village and civil parish in the City of Canterbury district of Kent, England. It contains 14 listed buildings that are recorded in the National Heritage List for England. Of these one is grade II* and 13 are grade II.

This list is based on the information retrieved online from Historic England.

== Key ==
Grade	Criteria
I	Buildings that are of exceptional interest
II*	Particularly important buildings of more than special interest
II	Buildings that are of special interest

== Listing ==
Name	Grade	Location	Type	Completed (Note: The date given is the date used by Historic England as significant for the initial building or that of an important part in the structure's description.)	Date designated	Grid ref. (Note: The grid reference is based on the British national grid reference system, sometimes known as OSGB36, used by the Ordnance Survey.) Geo-coordinates	Notes	Entry number (Note: The "List Entry Number" is a unique number assigned to each listed building and scheduled monument by Historic England.)	Image	Wikidata
Badgers Farmhouse	II	Badgers Close			27 January 1984	TR1208661219; 51°18′38″N 1°02′30″E		1241593	Upload Photo	Q26534462
Amery Court	II	Chapel Lane, Amery Court			29 September 1952	TR1256961655; 51°18′51″N 1°02′56″E		1085562	Upload Photo	Q26373193
Arbele Farmhouse	II	Chapel Lane, Arbele Farm			8 October 1976	TR1246661541; 51°18′48″N 1°02′50″E		1054082	Upload Photo	Q26305765
Honey Hill Farmhouse	II	11, Honey Hill, Honey Hill Farm			14 March 1980	TR1159461405; 51°18′45″N 1°02′05″E		1336582	Upload Photo	Q26621064
Red Lion House	II	74, Honey Hill			14 March 1980	TR1142362134; 51°19′08″N 1°01′58″E		1054086	Upload Photo	Q26305768
Clowes Farmhouse	II	Honey Hill, Clowes Farm			30 January 1967	TR1203962764; 51°19′28″N 1°02′31″E		1336562	Upload Photo	Q26621045
Honey Hill Cottage	II	Honey Hill			14 March 1980	TR1164661466; 51°18′47″N 1°02′08″E		1085519	Upload Photo	Q26372961
Oast House (rear of Melrose and Greenfields)	II	1-3, Pean Hill			20 May 1977	TR1096862502; 51°19′21″N 1°01′35″E		1084910	Upload Photo	Q26369759
Gas Lantern and Column at Corner of Fox's Cross Road	II	Pean Hill			20 May 1977	TR1098462560; 51°19′23″N 1°01′36″E		1084911	Upload Photo	Q26369766
Greenfields Melrose	II	Pean Hill			20 May 1977	TR1097962544; 51°19′22″N 1°01′36″E		1336906	Upload Photo	Q26621371
Yew Lodge	II	20, School Lane			14 March 1980	TR1233460964; 51°18′29″N 1°02′42″E		1085521	Upload Photo	Q26372973
Church Cottage	II	Tyler Hill Road, Church Cottage			14 March 1980	TR1297760754; 51°18′22″N 1°03′15″E		1336584	Upload Photo	Q26621066
Church of St Cosmus and St Damian	II*	Tyler Hill Road	church building		30 January 1967	TR1290460666; 51°18′19″N 1°03′11″E		1085522	Church of St Cosmus and St Damian More images	Q17557055
Blean House	II	Whitstable Road			30 January 1967	TR1298059580; 51°17′44″N 1°03′13″E		1187070	Upload Photo	Q26482306

== See also ==
- Grade I listed buildings in Kent
- Grade II* listed buildings in Kent

== Sources ==
- Newman, John (2013) [1969], Kent: North-East and East, The Buildings of England, New Haven and London: Yale University Press, ISBN 978-0-300-18506-5
