= Firmin Sword of Peace =

The Firmin Sword of Peace (previously known as the Wilkinson Sword of Peace) is an award given to units of the British Armed Forces for activities above and beyond the unit's normal role that improve relations with the community, either within the United Kingdom, or overseas.

The award was established by British swordmaker Wilkinson Sword in 1966, with the company presenting a ceremonial sword to one unit each of the Royal Navy (including the Royal Fleet Auxiliary), British Army, and Royal Air Force; each unit having been judged as making the most outstanding contribution to community relations within each service during the calendar year.

An award can be shared between multiple units on the same operation: for example, the 1998 Navy award was presented to the Royal Fleet Auxiliary ships Black Rover and Sir Tristram for their involvement in Operation Teller (the British relief response to Hurricane Mitch). The award can also be shared with foreign military units: the frigates HMS Galatea and HMNZS Canterbury received the 1983 Navy Sword of Peace after a series of port visits made by the two ships to African nations sparked several diplomatic initiatives. From 1994 onwards, the company began presenting a fourth sword to any joint-service unit or ad hoc single-operation unit that met the criteria for the award. Unlike the awards for the three services, the "Special" sword was only presented if such a unit existed and was deemed worth recognising.

After Wilkinson stopped the production of swords in 2005, Firmin & Sons began sponsoring the award. Awards have been made as follows:

== Firmin Sword of Peace ==
Year	Royal Navy	Army	RAF	Joint Service
2005	HMS Chatham	International Mine Action Training Centre (IMATC) Royal Engineers	RAF Linton on Ouse	No Award
2006	No Award	Support Battalion Headquarters Allied Rapid Reaction Corps	RAF Shawbury	Joint Service Signal Unit (Cyprus)
2007	HMS Gannet	39 Engineer Regiment	RAF Aldergrove	RAF Digby
2008	Northern Diving Group	24 Field Squadron (Air Support) Royal Engineers	RAF Shawbury	Joint Service Signal Unit (Cyprus)
2009	No Award	No Award	RAF High Wycombe	The Military Stabilisation Support Group (MSSG)
2010	RFA Largs Bay	64 Works Group Royal Engineers	RAF Shawbury	Joint Force Command Brunssum
2011	No Award	No Award	RAF Leeming	15 (UK) Psychological Operations Group
2012	First Patrol Boat Squadron	No Award	RAF Cosford	No Award
2013	HMS Daring	No Award	RAF Brize Norton	HMS Illustrious
2014	No Award	5 Armoured Medical Regiment	RAF Search and Rescue Force	No Award
2015	HMS Enterprise	2 Signal Regiment	The RAF Police	The Defence Cultural Specialist Unit
2016	No Award	11 (EOD) Regiment Royal Logistic Corps	RAF Marham	No Award
2017			RAF Benston	
2018			Tactical Medical Wing	
2019	40 Commando			
2020	HMS Albion			
2023	HMS Lancaster		Global Enablement Medical Force	
2025		16th Medical Regiment	RAF Brize Norton	
2026	Bravo Squadron, Diving and Threat Exploitation Group			

Additionally in 2014 a Special Achievement Award was made to the Gurkha Welfare Scheme.

== Wilkinson Sword of Peace ==
Year	Royal Navy	Army	RAF	Joint Service
2004				
2003				
2002				
2001				
2000				
1999				
1998	Task Group 326.02 (Op Teller)	8 R Irish (NI)	RAF Aldergrove	
1997	819 Naval Air Squadron	The Household Cavalry Regiment	1 & 34 Squadron RAF Regiment (Bosnia)	
1996	Inshore Training Squadron Russia and Spain	36 Engr Regt, Bosnia, & 1 RMP Bosnia/Germany	RAF Stornaway	
1995	HMS Invincible	Gurkha Welfare Scheme Nepal	RAF Laarbruch (Bosnia, Romania & Holland)	
1994	HMS Fearless	1 KOBR ((NI)	RAF Manston	
1993	HMS London	21 Engineer Regiment	RAF Kinloss	
1992	MCM Squadron	7 Signal Regiment (Albania) & 1st Cheshire Regiment, Bn Group, Bosnia	RAF Lyneham	
1991				
1990		7th/10th (City of Belfast) Battalion, Ulster Defense Regiment		
1989				
1988				
1987		3rd Bn The Queen's Regiment (Belize 86)		
1986	HMS Brazen			
1985		47 Air Despatch Squadron RCT		
1984	40 Commando			
1983	HMS Galatea and HMNZS Canterbury			
1982				
1981				
1980				
1979	HMS Fifi			
1972	40 Commando			
1966	40 Commando			
