= Hempel Group =

Danish coatings company

Hempel A/S
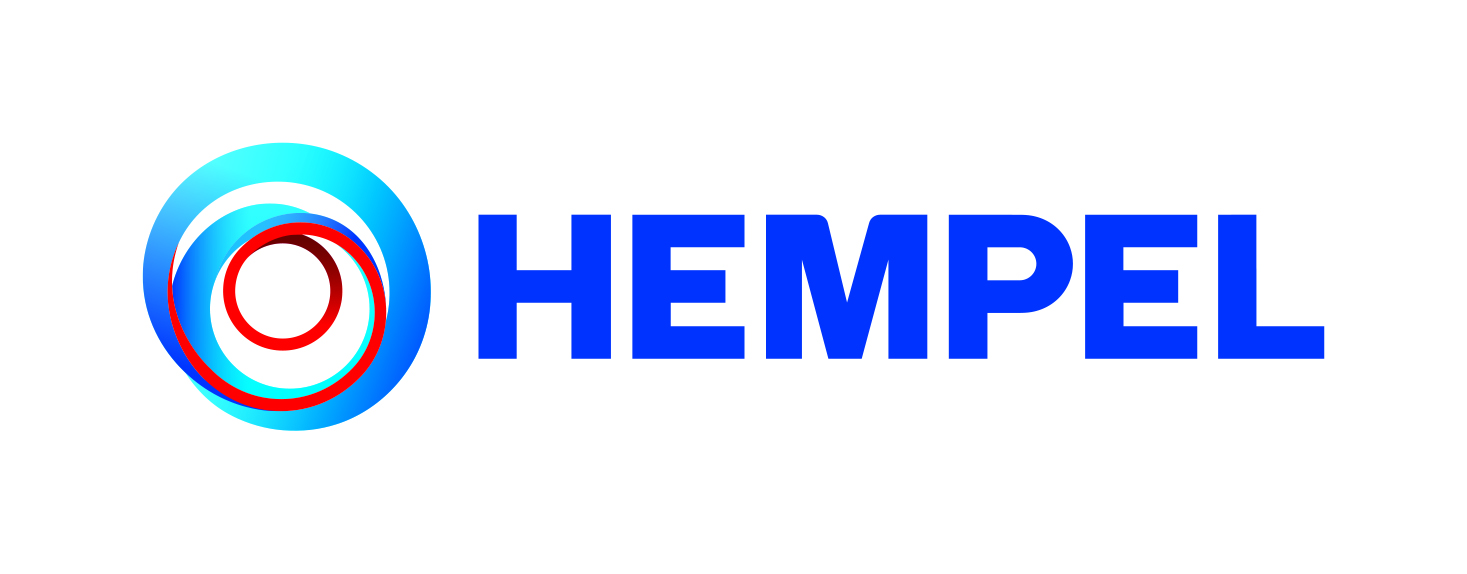

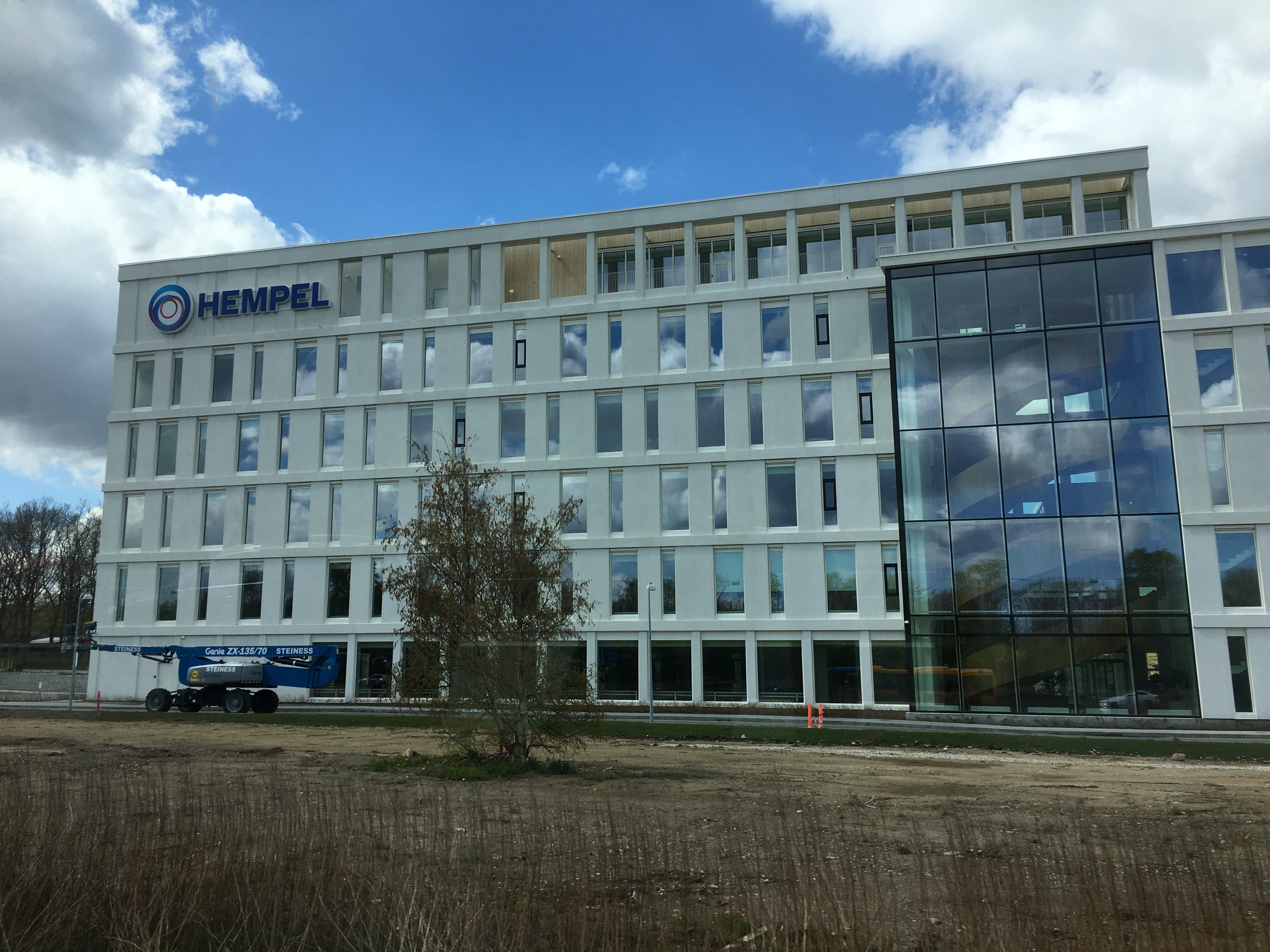
- Hempel headquarters in Lundtofte
- Type: Private limited company
- Industry: Coatings
- Founded: 1915
- Founder: Jørgen Christian Hempel
- Headquarters: Lyngby, Denmark
- Key people: Richard Sand (Chairman), Eric Alström (CEO), Peter la Cour Gormsen (CFO), Emilie Barriau (CTO), Anne-Christine Ahrenkiel (Chief People & Culture Officer), Ana Henriques (Executive Vice President of Decorative), Steen Niemann Madsen (Executive Vice President of Energy & Infrastructure), Malgorzata Kolton (Executive Vice President of Marine), René Overgaard Jensen (Chief Transformation & Information Officer)
- Revenue: EUR 2,165 million (2025)
- Number of employees: 7,000+ (2025)
- Website: hempel.com

Hempel A/S is a global supplier of coatings and paints in the protective, marine, decorative, container and yacht industries. Founded in Copenhagen, Denmark in 1915, Hempel is majority-owned by the Hempel Foundation.

== History ==
Hempel A/S is a global coatings manufacturer headquartered in Denmark, founded in July 1915 by Jørgen Christian Hempel (1894–1986) as Hempel's Marine Paints Ltd. (J.C. Hempel's Skibsfarve–Fabrik A/S). Initially established as a marine paint wholesaler, the company opened its own paint-mixing factory in 1916.

In 1917, Hempel collaborated with the Technical University of Denmark to develop its first antifouling coating for ships' hulls.

The company expanded internationally, establishing its first factory in the United States in 1951 and opening an office in Hong Kong in 1963. In the 1960s, Hempel began producing decorative coatings for the Middle East, opening its first regional factory in Kuwait in 1966.

During the 1970s, Hempel established a protective coatings division to serve industrial markets such as power generation and infrastructure. The company supplied coatings to a commercial wind farm in 1980, marking an early involvement in the renewable energy sector.

J.C. Hempel died in 1986 at the age of 91.

Hempel acquired Crown Paints in 2011.

== Headquarters ==
Hempel moved into its new headquarters in April 2013. The building is located in Lundtoftegårdsvej in Lundtofte, north of Copenhagen. The building is designed by Årstiderne Arkitekter. Hempel's old headquarters were sold to DTU.
