= Hospices of Hope =

UK charity supporting palliative care in South and Eastern Europe

- Named after: Hospice Casa Speranței (“House of Hope”)
- Predecessor: Hospice of Hope Romania
- Founded: 1991
- Founder: Graham Perolls
- Founded at: Otford, Sevenoaks, Kent, United Kingdom
- Type: Charity
- Tax ID no.: 1088475
- Registration no.: England and Wales: 1088475; Scotland: SC040117
- Legal status: Registered Charity; Company Limited by Guarantee
- Purpose: Development of palliative and end‑of‑life care services across South and East Europe
- Headquarters: 11 High Street, Otford, Kent, England
- Location: Edinburgh, Scotland; Chişinău, Moldova
- Coordinates: 51°18′47″N 0°11′22″E
- Region served: South and East Europe
- Services: Fundraising; hospice development & training; clinical & managerial consultancy; advocacy
- Official language: English
- Owner: None (governed by the Board of Trustees)
- Chief Executive Officer: Anna Perolls
- Board of directors: Trustees: Denis Keefe CMG (Chair), Sioned Evans (Vice-Chair), Peter Russell, Simone Ingram, Yapincak Erkan, Rick Woodward, Alex Blomfield, David Grace, David Goldsborough, Andreea Petreanu, Richard Macintyre
- Key people: Denis Keefe CMG (Chair of Trustees); Anna Perolls (Chief Executive Officer)
- Subsidiaries: Hospices of Hope Trading Company (19 charity shops across Kent, Sussex, Surrey, London & Edinburgh)
- Revenue: £1.6 million (FY 2023)
- Website: hospicesofhope.co.uk
- Remarks: Independent UK charity; evolved from the British Romanian Hospice Appeal/Hospice Casa Speranței partnership
- Formerly called: Hospice of Hope Romania Limited

Hospices of Hope is a UK-registered charity (registered number 1088475, Scottish charity number SC040117) founded in 1991 that develops and supports palliative and end-of-life care services across South and Eastern Europe. The organization operates from its headquarters at 11 High Street, Otford, Kent, with additional offices in Edinburgh and a branch in Moldova. Originally established as part of the Ellenor Foundation's international outreach, Hospices of Hope became an independent charity in 2000 while maintaining close historical ties to its parent organization.

== History ==
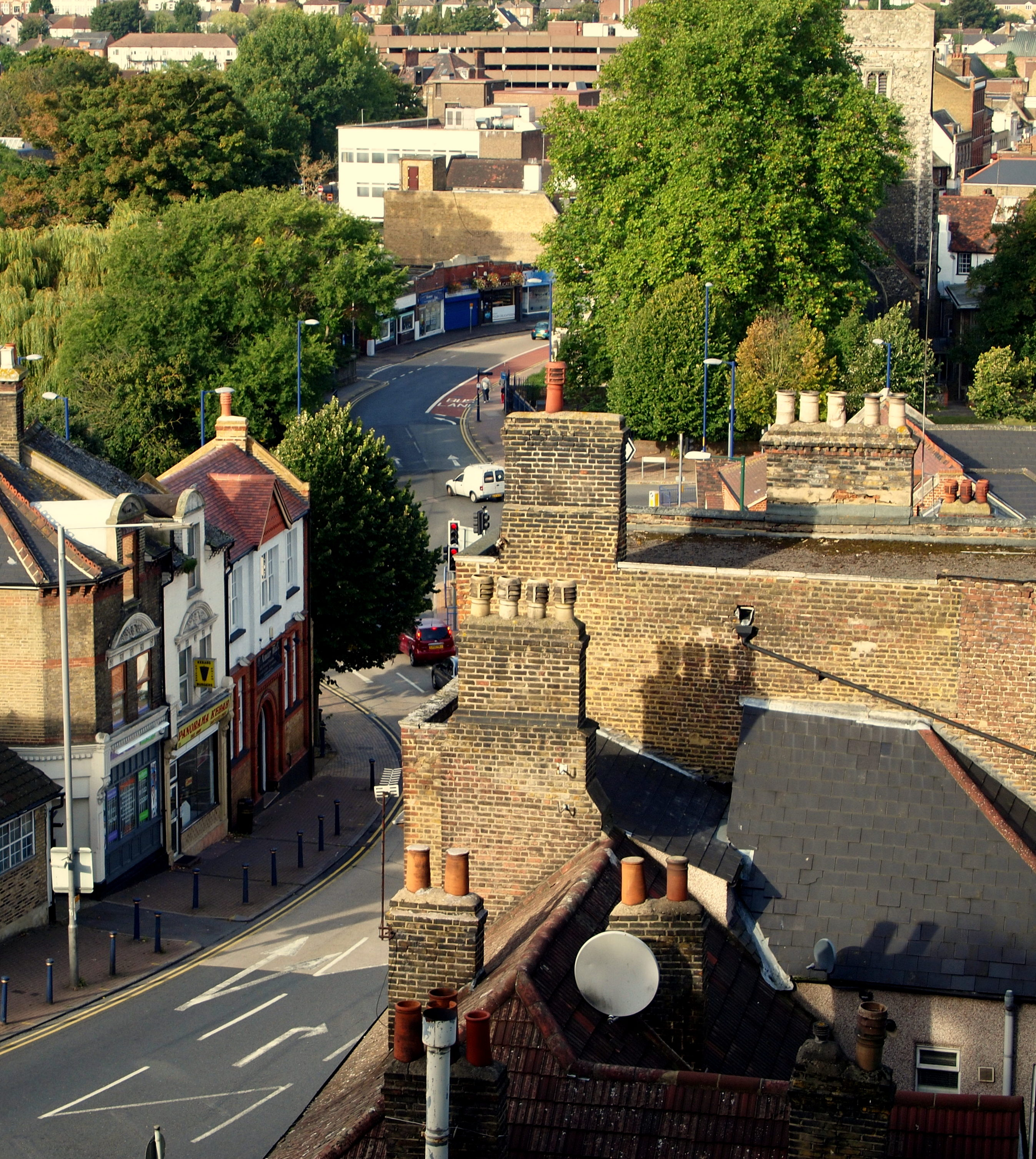
East Hill Drive, Dartford – the very street where Graham Perolls launched the Ellenor Foundation in 1985.

The roots of Hospices of Hope trace back to 1985 when Graham Perolls founded the Ellenor Foundation in Dartford, Kent, inspired by the deaths of his parents Ellen and Norman Perolls. The foundation was established with a vision that those facing end-of-life should receive the best possible care, either at home or as close to it as possible. Graham Perolls was motivated to start the organization after experiencing the contrasting care his parents received - one died at home while the other received care in a hospice. The international dimension began in 1991 when Graham Perolls launched a UK fundraising appeal to bring palliative care to post-communist Romania under the umbrella of the Ellenor Foundation. This initiative was sparked by his earlier travels to Romania in 1975 and subsequent return in 1989 following the Romanian revolution, where he witnessed the dire state of healthcare for terminally ill patients. The Romanian healthcare system at the time offered little support to those diagnosed with incurable diseases, with patients typically being "sent home to die" without adequate pain management or palliative care.

=== Transition to independence ===
The Romanian operations evolved rapidly throughout the 1990s, leading to the establishment of Hospices of Hope as a separate organization in 2000 with its own governance structure and identity. This transition allowed the charity to focus specifically on developing palliative care across Eastern and Southeastern Europe while Ellenor (charity number 1121561) continued as an independent local hospice charity serving Kent and Bexley. Despite becoming separate entities, both organizations maintain historical connections and shared values centered on providing compassionate end-of-life care.

== Organisational structure and governance ==
Hospices of Hope is governed by a Board of Trustees comprising 11 members as of 2026. The current leadership includes:

- Denis Keefe CMG - Chair of Trustees.
- Sioned Evans - Vice Chair
- Peter Russell - Trustee
- Simone Ingram - Trustee
- Yapincak Erkan - Trustee
- Rick Woodward - Trustee
- Alex Blomfield - Trustee
- David Grace - Trustee
- David Goldsborough - Trustee
- Andreea Petreanu - Trustee
- Richard Macintyre - Trustee

The Board meets typically four times per year for two-hour sessions held in central London, with additional strategic planning and development sessions as needed. Trustees are appointed for three-year terms, renewable up to two times, and are expected to maintain high levels of engagement with the charity's work.

== Operational structure ==
The charity operates through a hub-and-spoke model with its UK headquarters coordinating support for partner organizations across multiple countries. The organizational structure includes:

- UK Operations: Headquarters in Otford, Kent, and office in Edinburgh.
- Country Partners: Independent hospice organizations in Romania and Serbia with formal memorandums of understanding.
- Branch Operations: Direct presence in Moldova through Hospices of Hope Moldova.
- Trading Company: Operates a network of charity shops across South East England and Scotland.

== Geographic coverage and partners ==
=== Romania ===
Romania represents Hospices of Hope's longest-standing and most developed partnership network. The country hosts two major partner organizations: Hospice Casa Sperantei is the largest and most established partner, founded in 1992 in Brasov as the first Romanian charity dedicated to improving terminal illness care. The organization has grown to become the leading palliative care provider in Romania, operating multiple facilities:

- Brasov Campus: The original site featuring inpatient units, the Princess Diana Centre for Palliative Medicine (opened 1997), and day care facilities.
- Bucharest Centre: Opened in 2021 after five years of development, requiring an investment of over €5.7 million from donations. This facility is the first and only integrated palliative medicine unit in Bucharest, designed to serve 2,000 patients annually.
- Adunatii Copaceni: A specialised centre for children and families affected by life-limiting conditions, completed in 2018 and fully operational by 2021.
- Mobile Teams: Services in Fagaras and Zarnesti serve rural populations in Brasov County.

To date, Hospice Casa Sperantei has provided care and support to over 45,000 patients and more than 100,000 family members. The organization also serves as a major training center, with the Princess Diana Centre providing residential education programs for healthcare professionals across Eastern Europe. Emanuel Hospice, based in Oradea in northwestern Romania, serves as the only provider of palliative home-care services in the region. Since 1996, the organization has supported over 3,171 adults and 288 children with life-limiting illnesses. The hospice team offers teaching programs and vocational training, having trained over 250 doctors and nurses in palliative care. In 2022, Emanuel Hospice received the Diploma of Excellence for "Team of the Year" at the Romanian Healthcare Awards.

=== Serbia ===
BELhospice in Belgrade serves as Hospices of Hope's primary partner in Serbia, celebrating its 20th anniversary in 2024. The organization continues to provide palliative home care services but faces significant challenges with staff recruitment, particularly for nursing positions, and managing long-term sickness issues within the Serbian healthcare system. Despite these challenges, BELhospice has completed and opened the first palliative care center in Serbia, fully equipped for day care, outpatient services, home care, and training.

=== Moldova ===
Hospices of Hope began working in the Republic of Moldova in 2008, and in 2017 launched the first National Network of Palliative Care services in the country. It annually provides over 20,000 home care visits to patients in need of vital care. Currently, there are 4 palliative care teams offering free of charge services to beneficiaries living with life-limiting illnesses. In 2022 the first specialist Day Care Centre was launched in Orhei, and declared as a role model by the Minister of Health. The services provided by Hospices of Hope Moldova include access to specialist medicines and medical equipment, they offer continuous support from the central office in order to support patients in Orhei, Soroca, Balti and Chisinau which are located in the North, South and central parts of the country.

=== Albania ===
Hospices of Hope is partnered with Ryder Albania who started work in Tirana in 1993 with the support of Sue Ruder Charity in the UK. They provide compassionate end-of-life care in Tirana and Durrës. Ryder Albania’s multidisciplinary teams offer home care services in both cities. The teams provide free medical care, psychological counselling and assistance with social service issues to patients and their families. Since 2018, Hospices of Hope together with Ryder Albania has made a major contribution towards the development of palliative care in Albania with the help of international funding, Hospices of Hope grants and local fundraising.

=== Greece ===
Hospices of Hope has established partnerships with two organisations in Athens, Greece: Merimna, the only children's care organisation in Greece. And Nosilia, who specialise in adult care. Hospices of Hope provides strategic guidance and has helped Nosilia to break ground on the first palliative care day centre in Athens. Merimna was established in 1995, originally to provide bereavement counselling for children affected by the death of a parent. In 2010, they launched the first palliative home-care service in Athens and in 2013, they extended their bereavement service to Thessaloniki.

=== Ukraine ===
In August 2O22, Hospices of Hope signed a formal partnership with the St Panteleymon Charity Fund, which supports hospices in Western Ukraine to offer our help and support. in 2024 Hospices of Hope partnered with CF SVOYI, which provides mobile team services helping patients in Kyiv and surrounding regions. Ukraine's hospice sector has been severely impacted by the ongoing conflict, with only 5 of the original 19 independent hospices remaining operational. Traditional government funding for medical staff and essential costs has been gradually reduced, with the Ministry of Health announcing a 22% funding cut in 2023. In March 2025, Hospices of Hope supported the opening of a new clinic in Kyiv, which serves as an out-patient clinic, day centre, and base for an expanded home-care team.

== Services and impact ==
=== Clinical services ===
Hospices of Hope supports comprehensive palliative care services through its partner network, including:

- Inpatient Care: Specialised hospital units providing symptom control, pain management, and end-of-life care.
- Home Care Services: Mobile teams delivering care in patients' homes, particularly important for rural and underserved populations.
- Day Care Centers: Outpatient facilities offering therapeutic activities and support services.
- Pediatric Services: Specialised care for children with life-limiting conditions and their families.
- Bereavement Support: Counseling and support services for families following patient death.

=== Financial performance and sustainability ===
==== Revenue and fundraising ====
Hospices of Hope has demonstrated strong financial performance with diversified revenue streams. In 2023, the organization exceeded its fundraising target by raising over £1.6 million, surpassing the planned £1.5 million goal. The charity's income sources include:

- Charity Shops: Record financial performance in 2023, raising over £400,000 in profit from 18 retail locations, significantly exceeding the targeted £186,000.
- Trusts and Foundations: More than 14% of income received through grant funding.
- Individual Donations: Traditional donor support supplemented by legacy gifts.
- Corporate Partnerships: Business partnerships providing funds for key personnel roles.
- Events: Annual gala dinners and fundraising activities.

== Trading operations ==
The charity operates through a wholly owned trading company that runs 19 charity shops across Kent, Sussex, Surrey, London, Oxfordshire and Edinburgh. Notable retail locations include:

- Oxford: New shop opened in 2025
- Clapham: Oened in September 2024 with international ballerina and patron Alina Cojocaru performing the official ribbon cutting.
- Otford: Flagship location benefiting from additional footfall driven by an associated bistro.
- Edinburgh: Northern operations extending the retail footprint.

The retail network generated a surplus of over £400,000 in 2023, representing a significant increase from previous years. This success occurred despite challenging economic conditions and increased operational costs.

== Grant funding and major gifts ==
Hospices of Hope has successfully secured several major funding commitments:

- Colyer-Fergusson Charitable Trust: £2 million contribution toward ellenor's wellbeing wing development in Gravesend, Kent.
- Various Trusts: Multiple grant applications approved for country partner support.
- Corporate Support: Partnerships providing funding for specific roles and projects

== Retail operations and community engagement ==
=== Charity Shop Network ===
Hospices of Hope operates an extensive retail network generating significant revenue for charitable activities. The shops stock diverse merchandise including clothing, furniture, books, art, and collectibles, with a policy of never turning away donations.

Notable Locations:

- Faversham: 19a Preston Street, described as a "true community hub" where everyone is welcome to shop, donate, or socialize.
- Victoria, London: 40 Warwick Way (near Pimlico station).
- Waterloo, London: 87 Lower Marsh (near Lambeth North station).

== Volunteer program ==
Hospices of Hope maintains a volunteer program supporting operations across shops, offices, medical supplies warehouse, and administrative functions. Volunteers contribute skills and time for the organization's operations and costs. The organization recruits volunteers and recognizes their contributions through website features, social media posts, and annual impact reviews.

== Community events and fundraising ==
Hospices of Hope organizes a diverse calendar of community events designed to engage supporters and raise funds:

=== Regular events ===
- Quiz Nights: Held in locations like Otford and Maidstone.
- Wine Tastings: London events at venues such as The Ratiu Foundation.
- Gin Tastings: Kent-based events at The Olive Tree, Otford.
- Wreath Workshops: Seasonal activities in both Kent and Sussex.
- CEO Meetings: Annual opportunities for supporters to meet hospice partner leadership.

==== Special events ====
- Film Screenings: Exclusive showings such as "The Wishing Tree," a Romanian charity film supporting Casa Sperantei.
- Cycling Challenges: Multi-day events through Kent countryside and coastal routes.
- Annual Gala Dinner: Major fundraising events generating significant revenue.

== Controversies and challenges ==
=== 2017 homeless ban controversy ===
In December 2017, Hospices of Hope faced significant criticism for posting signs at their Rochester charity shop banning homeless people from sleeping in the shop's porch area. The sign read: "Sleeping in the area is not permitted. Police action will be taken against anyone using the area for sleeping, leaving rubbish or any other waste". Local resident Steve Povey criticized the policy on social media, stating: "Charity shop, but no charity for the homeless it seems". The controversy highlighted tensions between the charity's humanitarian mission in Eastern Europe and its local community policies. Carolyn Perolls, defending the decision, cited staff safety and hygiene concerns: "It might seem harsh but having to clean human faeces on a daily basis is also harsh on our staff. We're very supportive of the plight of homeless people but it's not fair on our staff to have to clean up that type of thing every day". She emphasized that the policy was implemented to protect staff rather than from lack of compassion, noting that staff time spent on cleaning and police calls detracted from processing donations and serving the community.

=== 2020 vandalism attacks ===
Between June and July 2020, Hospices of Hope became the target of a coordinated series of vandalism attacks affecting multiple charity shop locations. The attacks resulted in approximately £30,000 in repair costs and affected stores across several regions:

Affected Locations:

- Tunbridge Wells: Mount Pleasant Road shop had front and side windows shattered.
- Tonbridge: High Street location targeted on multiple occasions.
- Otford: High Street shop damaged.
- Faversham: Property damage reported.
- Bexley: South London location affected.
- Pimlico, Central London: Central London shop vandalized.

Inspector Dave Higham of the Tunbridge Wells Community Safety Unit investigated the incidents, stating: "These offences have cost the charity around £30,000 to repair. We are keeping an open mind as to whether all of these incidents are linked and the possible motive". Kent Police encouraged local businesses to review CCTV systems to assist with the investigation, particularly those that had been closed during COVID-19 restrictions.

== Strategic partnerships and networks ==
=== International collaborations ===
Hospices of Hope maintains memberships and partnerships with several international organizations:

- European Academy of Palliative Care: Collaborative project with King's College London, University of Cologne, and Nicolaus Copernicus University.
- Various Medical Institutions: Training partnerships across Eastern Europe.

=== UK sector engagement ===
The organization participates actively in UK charitable sector networks:

- Charity Commission: Regular compliance and reporting.

=== Government relations ===
Hospices of Hope works closely with government bodies in target countries to influence policy and funding for palliative care:

- Romania: Collaboration with health ministry officials and medical institutions.
- Moldova: Strategic alignment with national public health strategy.
- Serbia: Partnership development with healthcare regulators.
- United Kingdom: Engagement with development aid and charitable funding programs.

== Scope of work ==
=== Romania ===
==== HOSPICE Casa Sperantei, Brasov ====
Founded in 1992, Casa Sperantei provides care for people living with terminal illnesses and children with a range of life-limiting illnesses with a team also serving the capital, Bucharest. There also exists an education programme to aid the development of palliative care nationally and in neighbouring Balkan countries. The hospice works to develop a national strategy for palliative care with the Ministry of Health.

==== Hospice Casa Sperantei Rural Teams ====
These teams operate in the Fagara and Zarnesti regions and provide palliative care in the form of home visits.

==== HOSPICE Casa Sperantei "Princess Diana" Education Centre, Brasov ====
Established in 1997, this centre is accredited by Ministry of Public Health as the National Study and Resource Centre for Palliative Care. In 2000, it became the Regional Palliative Care Training Centre for South-Eastern Europe.

==== Hospice Casa Sperantei, Bucharest ====
HOSPICE Casa Sperantei, Bucharest, was established in 2005. It delivered care via medical teams which provided home and hospital visits. Bucharest's first out-patient clinic opened in 2007. In 2014, a new hospice was built in the Romanian capital.

=== Serbia ===
Hospices of Hope supports Belhospice which was established in 2004 by Dr. Natasa Milicevic. In 2006 the Prue Dufour medical educational centre was established.

=== Moldova ===
Hospices of Hope Moldova supports existing palliative care organisations in the regions of Orhei, Soroca, and Ocnita. Medical supplies such as stoma bags and prosthetic breasts are also sent to Moldova from UK donations.
