= Corin Mellor =

English designer

Corin Mellor (born 17 December 1966) is a designer specializing in silverware, tableware and furniture. Son of the biographer Fiona MacCarthy and the cutlery designer David Mellor, he succeeded his father on his retirement in 2002 as creative director of the family-owned manufacturing and retailing company David Mellor Design.

== Early life and training ==
Mellor was born in Sheffield and trained in product design at Kingston University. He worked for the London architects Yorke Rosenberg and Mardall before joining his father in the family design firm.

== David Mellor shops and Design Museum ==
Mellor has been involved in the David Mellor shops, the first of which opened in Sloane Square, London in 1969. He has responsibility for the design of the interior and the product selection, and has designed various items.

Mellor also designed the interior of the David Mellor Design Museum in Hathersage, Derbyshire, working closely with the architect Michael Hopkins. The museum won a Countryside Award for its design excellence in 2007.

In 2012 his plywood furniture was awarded the Design Guild Mark from The Worshipful Company of Furniture Makers.

== Special commissions ==
His earliest design commissions were for furniture. Mellor’s public seating can be seen at the Lowry Gallery in Salford Quays, the Millennium Galleries and Winter Garden, Sheffield. He has recently completed a sculptural bench in galvanised steel and oak for the Duke and Duchess of Devonshire at Chatsworth.

In 2008 Mellor was commissioned to make a large scale Advent Wreath for Sheffield Cathedral, a piece of metalwork comprising a mass of vertical rods in stainless steel. From this developed a series of stainless steel candelabra for domestic interiors using the same structure. These pieces were shortlisted for the Blueprint Design Award 2008. An exhibition of Corin Mellor’s decorative metalwork was held at the Yorkshire Sculpture Park in 2009.

His latest architectural metalwork commission is a sculptural bridge link for the new Sheffield city centre building for Sheffield Hallam University. Recent silversmithing commissions include silver bowls for The Prince of Wales and for The Queen's Diamond Jubilee candles for Sheffield Cathedral's Royal Maundy Service.

== Family ==
He is married to the photographer Helen Mellor and they have two children. In April 2009 The Independent newspaper described them as 'the first family of design'. Corin’s mother was the biographer and critic Fiona MacCarthy. His sister, Clare Mellor, runs her own graphic design firm.

== Public appointments ==
Mellor is a member of the board of Museums Sheffield. He is a freeman of the Worshipful Company of Goldsmiths and a freeman of the Company of Cutlers in Hallamshire. In 2013 he was made a guardian of the Sheffield Assay Office and was also given an honorary doctorate from Sheffield Hallam University.
