= Robert Welch (designer) =

English industrial designer and silversmith (1929–2000)

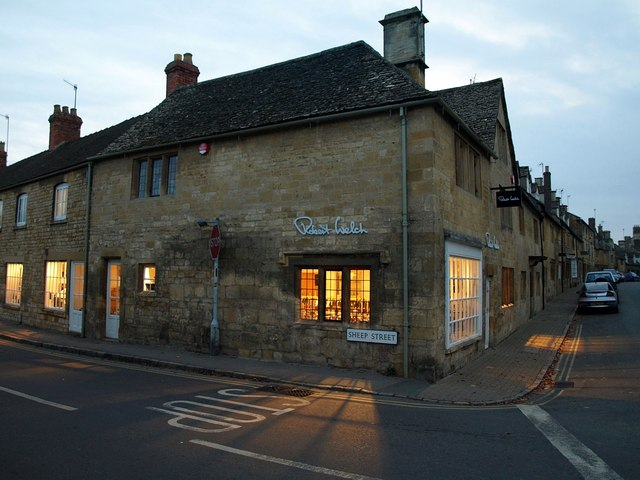
Robert Welch's premises on Lower High Street, Chipping Campden, seen in October 2009

Robert Radford Welch MBE, RDI (21 May 1929 – 15 March 2000), was an English designer and silversmith.

== Early life and education ==
Born in Hereford, Welch was the only son of Leonard Radford Welch (1894–1969) and his wife, Dorothy Perkins (1897–1982), who trained as an artist before their marriage in 1923.

=== Childhood ===
When Welch was young, the family moved to the village of Colwall, which sits on the side of the Malvern Hills and, in 1939, to West Malvern, Worcestershire where he grew up. He had a lifelong love of the Malvern Hills and often walked there.

He was educated at the boys' school in Colwall, then at Lyttelton Grammar School in Malvern where he sang in Malvern Priory choir and finally Hanley Castle Grammar School where he excelled at sport.

He briefly played cricket for the Second XI of Worcestershire County Cricket Club, before deciding to study at Malvern School of Art.

=== Malvern School of Art and Birmingham College of Art ===
His time at Malvern was broken up by two years of National Service, during which time he served as a wireless operator in the Royal Air Force. While in the RAF he attended classes at Cambridge School of Art before returning to complete his studies at Malvern, 1949–50.

He had undertaken rudimentary metalwork classes at Malvern, or 'metal-bashing' as it was known, however he officially began his training as a silversmith at the Birmingham College of Art, School of Silversmithing and Jewellery which was also where he completed his National Diploma in Design.

Welch made his first work in a precious metal, a powder bowl, in 1950 but examples of his work in metals survive from as early as 1946.

=== Royal College of Art and Scandinavia ===
He went on to study at the Royal College of Art in 1952, the year after the Festival of Britain, joining David Mellor and Gerald Benney who were both a year above him. Welch was the only silversmith in his year.

All three were to become renowned in their field, creating "remarkable one-off commissions in silver, as well as tackling production designs in newly fashionable and affordable stainless steel. During the 1950s they had all been influenced to a large degree by the Scandinavian Modern style, especially the anthropomorphic vessels and jewellery of the Danish sculptor-designer Henning Koppel for Georg Jensen." Lesley Jackson

As a student, Welch made four extended visits to Scandinavia, studying in Stockholm and working with the Norwegian silversmith Theodor Olsen. Scandinavian modernism made a huge impression on him, instilling a love of functional precision and the clean line. In his final year at the Royal College of Art, he decided to focus his studies on designing for stainless steel and wrote his thesis on The Design and Production of Stainless Steel Tableware whilst focusing his final projects on the development of its look.

“I felt that the first thing that had to be done was to establish a style for stainless ware which would be expressive of the material itself. A strong, tough, but not intractable medium, but one which was still the captive of the older materials. For instance, tableware in stainless steel was still being made in mirror finish only, and that seemed to me to have all the qualities of chromium-plated ware. It was a long way from the satin finish which was already coming in from Scandinavia. It seemed to me that this beautiful finish possessed just that note of severity which stainless steel seems to demand. Stainless steel needed to have its own appearance, not that of other metals, and the design had to go hand in hand with the function of the piece and that individual appearance." Robert Welch

== Design career ==
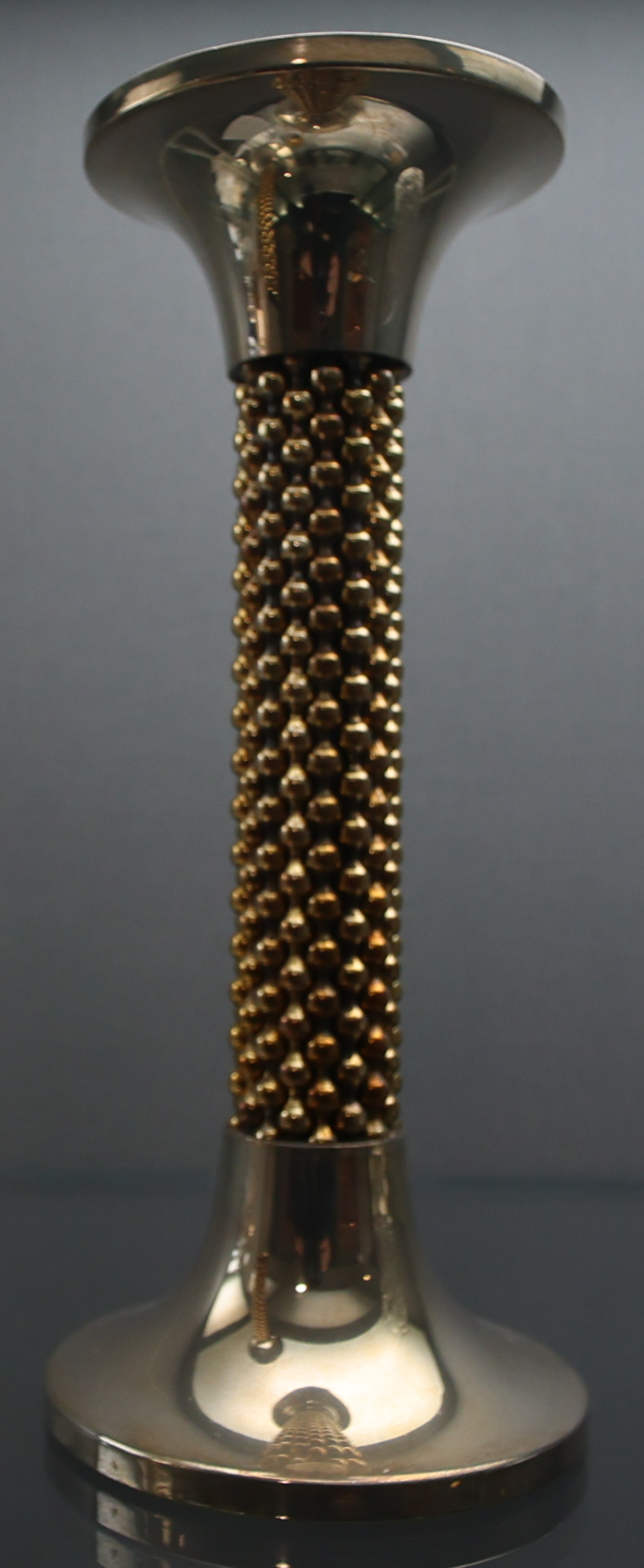
One of a pair of candlesticks designed in the early 1970s

=== Industrial design ===
Welch successfully sold one of his prototype designs to J. & J. Wiggin before he left college. A small family firm in Bloxwich, north of Birmingham, J. & J. Wiggin was the only British manufacturer of stainless steel tableware, marketing pieces under the brand Old Hall. Welch did some work for the firm whilst still a student and in 1955, he was appointed as their consultant designer, an association which lasted until the firm closed in 1984. His geometrical ideal suited the material, and his passion for precision suited the factory.

In 1955 Welch established a workshop and studio in Chipping Campden, Gloucestershire in a silk mill that had formerly been the home of Charles Robert Ashbee's Guild and School of Handicraft. He had chosen this area because it was easy for him to visit the Wiggins' factory in Bloxwich, and his parents' home in West Malvern, as well as London – to where he would eventually travel for teaching posts – but it would remain a base for the rest of his working life.

“The village has an enduring quality and permanence about it which has permeated Robert's work" – Jeremy Myerson.

The industrial design side of the business, Robert Welch Associates, produced work for clients including Royal Doulton, British Railways, Guinness, BOAC, H. E. Lauffer, Carl Prinz and Poole Pottery.

=== Silversmithing ===
Welch continued to work in silver throughout his career, creating elegant one-off designs in response to commissions for ecclesiastical, institutional, ceremonial and domestic plate.

In the late 1950s, the silversmith and artist John Limbrey (1933–2013), who had also previously studied silversmithing at Birmingham, came on a visit to the Cotswolds. He knocked on the door of the studio-workshop and said "What a nice place to work, do you want any help?" He began working with Welch in 1958, from which point he was largely responsible for making most of the commissioned ecclesiastical and domestic silverware. He remained as silversmith, model maker and draughtsman until well into the 21st century.

In 1960, Prince Philip commissioned Welch to design and produce a silver trophy, known as the Prince Philip Silver Wink, which has been awarded since 1961 to the top British university tiddlywinks team competing in inter-university matches.

=== Inspiration ===
“Early on I was inspired by architecture, by Corbusier, Mies van der Rohe, and Marcel Breuer. I went to see Corbusier's Ronchamp chapel just after it was built. But lately, my sources of inspiration have been painters and sculptors, Brancusi and Giacometti, for example." Robert Welch

"It’s one of these questions which is always asked: ‘Where does one draw one’s inspiration from?’. There is no one source, one just sort of reacts to life, rather like a light meter, you can see things under any conditions, in any circumstances. Of course consciously one can keep one's mind alert; I like to spend a great deal of time in museums, I like to carefully study all sorts of things, I enjoy looking and browsing through books on old silver, books on old iron. Inspiration can come from anywhere, from bubbles, from looking at a beehive, from looking at a bird's nest, anything can happen. It's just one of these things which cannot be really pinpointed, you just (...) are alert and aware and receptive, and somehow things just happen." Robert Welch

== Awards and honours ==
1962 Elected FSIA (Fellow of the Society of Industrial Artists)

1965 Elected RDI (Royal Designer for Industry) – a faculty within the Royal Society of Arts

1979 Awarded MBE (Member of the Most Excellent Order of the British Empire)

== Selected designs ==
Dates denote year/s of design, year of first production may be later

1956 Campden tableware and cutlery range, named after Chipping Campden, Gloucestershire, where his studio was based. The cutlery was jointly designed with David Mellor (designer). The Campden toast rack won a Design Centre Award in 1957.

1957–1960 Oriana tableware and cutlery range. Commissioned by the Orient Line for the ocean liner Oriana, launched in 1960.

1961 CD25 cast iron candlestick (medium), the first of a decorative range of cast iron pieces. This was re-launched in the mid-1990s as Hobart.

1961 Merlin alarm clock for Westclox.

1961 Alveston cutlery, named after his home village, near Stratford-upon-Avon. Alveston cutlery won a Design Council Award in 1965.

1961-4 Alveston tea set. Including what is often referred to as the Aladdin tea pot.

1966 Lumitron 3000 lighting range.

1979 Kitchen Devils' Professional knife range. The Kitchen Devils Professional knife range won a Design Centre Award in 1984.

== Museum Collections ==
Welch's designs are in several museum collections including: the Victoria and Albert Museum and British Museum, London; Museum of Modern Art, New York; Philadelphia Museum of Art, USA; Museum Boijmans van Beuningen, the Netherlands; KODE Art Museums of Bergen, Norway.

== Robert Welch Designs ==
The design business is today run by Alice and Rupert Welch, two of his three children.

Each new design is still created in Chipping Campden in the same building where Welch began his career over half a century ago.
