= Fiona MacCarthy =

British biographer (1940–2020)

Fiona MacCarthy OBE
- Born: 23 January 1940; Sutton, Surrey, England
- Died: 29 February 2020 (aged 80); Sheffield, England
- Education: Wycombe Abbey School; Lady Margaret Hall, Oxford
- Occupations: Art historian; journalist
- Spouses: Ian White-Thomson (m. 1961, divorced); David Mellor (m. 1966; died 2009)
- Children: 2

Fiona Caroline MacCarthy OBE (23 January 1940 – 29 February 2020) was a British biographer and cultural historian best known for her studies of 19th- and 20th-century art and design.

== Early life and education ==
Fiona MacCarthy was born in Sutton, Surrey, in 1940, into an upper-class background, from which she spent much of her life escaping. Her father, Gerald MacCarthy, was an officer in the Royal Artillery and was killed in action in North Africa during the Second World War in 1943. Fiona MacCarthy, her sister and mother, Yolande, lived in London and then Scotland before returning to London. Her grandmother, the Baroness de Belabre, was a daughter of Sir Robert McAlpine, 1st Baronet, who built and owned the Dorchester Hotel, and much of her childhood was spent in the hotel. Supposedly safe from bombing raids, her family took refuge there during The Blitz.

MacCarthy was educated at Wycombe Abbey School. In 1958, after a spell in Paris, she was a debutante being presented to the Queen at Queen Charlotte's Ball in the final year of the 200-year-old ritual, an experience MacCarthy recounted in her memoir, Last Curtsey: the End of the Debutantes (2007). She was one of only four of that year's debutantes to go on to university, in her case studying for a degree in English literature at Lady Margaret Hall, Oxford.

== Career ==
After graduation, MacCarthy's first job was as a merchandise editor and then journalist on House & Garden magazine. MacCarthy joined The Guardian in 1963 initially as an assistant to the women's editor Mary Stott. She was then appointed the newspaper's design correspondent, working as a features writer and columnist, sometimes using a pseudonymous byline to avoid two articles appearing in the same issue. In this role, she interviewed David Hockney, Betty Friedan and John Lennon among others. She left The Guardian in 1969, briefly becoming women's editor of the London Evening Standard, before settling in Sheffield.

In Sheffield, MacCarthy became a biographer and critic. After writing a biography of the arts and crafts designer C. R. Ashbee, she came to wider attention as a biographer with a once-controversial study of the Roman Catholic craftsman and sculptor Eric Gill, first published in 1989. Subsequent biographies of Stanley Spencer in 1997 and of Byron in 2002 enhanced her reputation for undertaking detailed research into her subjects. MacCarthy was also known for her arts essays and reviews, which appeared in The Guardian, The Times Literary Supplement and The New York Review of Books. She contributed to TV and radio arts programmes.

== Awards and honours ==
Fiona MacCarthy was a Fellow of the Royal Society of Literature (1997), an Honorary Fellow of Lady Margaret Hall, Oxford, and a Senior Fellow of the Royal College of Art.

She was appointed an Officer of the Order of the British Empire (OBE) for services to literature in the 2009 Birthday Honours. She was awarded honorary doctorates by the University of Sheffield and Sheffield Hallam University and was awarded the Bicentenary Medal of the Royal Society of Arts.

Her biography William Morris: A Life for our Time (1994) was winner of the Wolfson History Prize and the Writers' Guild Non-fiction Award. The Last Pre-Raphaelite: Edward Burne-Jones and the Victorian Imagination won the 2012 James Tait Black prize for Biography. Her life of Walter Gropius, founder of the Bauhaus, was published in 2019.

== Personal life ==
Her first marriage to Ian White-Thompson ended in divorce. In 1966, she married the Sheffield-based silversmith and cutlery designer David Mellor. She first met him when she went to interview him for The Guardian in 1964. They had two children, Corin and Clare, both of whom have now become designers. After suffering from dementia for some years, Mellor died in May 2009.

Fiona MacCarthy died from multiple myeloma at the Royal Hallamshire Hospital in Sheffield on 29 February 2020, aged 80.

== Works ==
- 1972 All Things Bright and Beautiful: British Design 1830 to Today
- 1981 The Simple Life: C. R. Ashbee in the Cotswolds
- 1984 The Omega Workshops: Decorative Arts of Bloomsbury
- 1989 Eric Gill (ISBN 0-571-13754-7)
- 1994 William Morris: A Life for our Time (ISBN 0-394-58531-3)
- 1997 Stanley Spencer: An English Vision (ISBN 978-0300073379)
- 2002 Byron: Life and Legend (ISBN 0-7195-5621-X)
- 2007 Last Curtsey: The End of the Debutantes (ISBN 0-571-22859-3)
- 2011 The Last Pre-Raphaelite: Edward Burne-Jones and the Victorian Imagination (ISBN 978-0-571-22861-4)
- 2019 Walter Gropius: Visionary Founder of the Bauhaus (ISBN 978-0-571-29513-5)

== Exhibitions ==
She curated the following exhibitions:

- Homespun to Highspeed: British Design 1860 to 1960 for Sheffield Museums and Art Galleries, 1979
- The Omega Workshops: Decorative Arts of Bloomsbury for the Crafts Council, 1984
- Eye for Industry: retrospective of the Royal Designers for the Victoria and Albert Museum, 1986
- Byron for the National Portrait Gallery, 2002
- Anarchy and Beauty, William Morris and his Legacy for the National Portrait Gallery, 2014
