= Crown Paints =

Paint manufacturer

- Company type: Private
- Industry: Decorating
- Founded: Late 1850s
- Headquarters: Darwen, Lancashire; Coolock, Dublin
- Products: Paint
- Parent: Hempel Group
- Website: www.crownpaints.com

Crown Paints is a major paint manufacturer based in Darwen, Lancashire and Coolock, Dublin. It is owned by Hempel Group.

== History ==
The origins of the business lie in the history of paint making in Darwen, which can be traced back to the late 1850s. It initially traded as WalPaMur after the initials of The Wall Paper Manufacturers' Company.

The company was acquired by the Reed Group in 1965.

Queen Elizabeth II visited Crown House, the Walpamur headquarters in Darwen, in 1968. The company traded as Crown Berger for over a century before it was taken over by Williams Holdings in 1987 and then by Akzo Nobel in 1990.

It was sold in a management buyout backed by the private equity firm Endless in August 2008, in a deal to satisfy the European Union's concerns of a possible monopoly after Akzo Nobel's takeover of ICI. The company were once sponsors of Liverpool F.C. and Blackburn Rovers F.C. In June 2011, the company was acquired by Danish paints manufacturer, Hempel Group.

The company holds a Royal Warrant from King Charles III.
