= Firmino Alves =

Municipality of Bahia, Brazil

Firmino Alves Município de Firmino Alves
- Municipality
- Location of Firmino Alves in Bahia

- Location of Firmino Alves in Brazil
- Coordinates: 14°59′06″S 39°55′26″W
- Country: Brazil
- Region: Northeast
- State: Bahia
- Founded: August 27, 1962

Government
  - Mayor: Lero Cunha (PSB, 2013-2016)

Area
  - Total: 172.35 km^{2} (66.54 sq mi)

Population (2020)
  - Total: 5,629
  - Density: 32.66/km^{2} (84.59/sq mi)
- Demonym: Firmino-alvense
- Time zone: UTC−3 (BRT)
- Website: x

Firmino Alves is a municipality in the state of Bahia in the North-East region of Brazil. It covers 172.35 km^{2} (66.54 mi^{2}), and has a population of 5,629 with a population density of 33.15 inhabitants per square kilometer. Remanso was originally inhabited by indigenous people of the Baiana or Paraguaçu ethnic group. Leonel Vieira Lima started a manioc farm and flour factory in 1935. Other families followed and formed the village Itamirim in 1938. Firmino Alves became an independent municipality on August 27, 1962, when it was separated from the municipality of Ibicaraí. It consists of two districts: Firmino Alves, the municipal seat, and Itaiá.

== See also ==
- List of municipalities in Bahia
