= Simon Benney =

British silversmith and jeweller

Simon Benney (born 1 January 1966) is an English designer and maker of jewellery and objets d'art. The holder of two Royal Warrants, for Queen Elizabeth II and Charles, Prince of Wales (later King Charles III), he has personally undertaken commissions for the British royal family, including "a fair amount of the more recent Windsor family silverware". He has been described by The Guardian as "one of the country's leading silversmiths".

== Family and education ==
Simon is the youngest son of journalist Janet Benney and silversmith Gerald Benney, the first British craftsperson to hold four Royal Warrants at the same time - a feat Simon also went on to achieve in around 2000. He has two brothers, one the artist Paul Benney, and a sister.

He was educated at Charterhouse School and the Gemological Institute of America in Carlsbad, California.

== Career ==
Having left the Gemological Institute of America, Benney worked independently during the 1980s before taking over the House of Benney from his father in the early 1990s.

Simon Benney in his own right is a Goldsmith and Silversmith to the British Royal Family, holding all current Royal Warrants and regularly undertaking bespoke commissions.

Benney was the subject of a BBC documentary titled Handmade by Royal Appointment, a series which followed four different Royal Warrant holders. Narrated by Zoe Wanamaker, the series first aired in 2016 and followed Wedgwood, John Lobb Bootmaker and Steinway & Sons, as well as Benney. He also makes watch cases and has collaborated with various other houses including the House of Faberge.

Benney is the designer and maker of The Three Graces, a candelabra which took two years to complete and was, at the time, the most valuable modern silver commission since World War II, valued by Bonhams at between £250,000 and £300,000. It was unveiled at a standalone exhibition at Goldsmiths' Hall in January 2008, and was described by Bonhams head of silver Ellis Finch as: "...a miraculous piece of design and construction. It is, of course, meant to be used and is fully functional, but in its subtlety and mastery of technique it should also be seen as a work of art – a modern sculpture."

Benney also collaborated with harp enthusiast Andy Lowings on the re-creation of the "Golden Lyre of Ur", one of the 5,000-year-old Lyre of Ur harps.
