= Saint-Firmin =

Saint-Firmin may refer to the following places in France:

- Saint-Firmin, Hautes-Alpes, a commune in the department of Hautes-Alpes
- Saint-Firmin, Meurthe-et-Moselle, a commune in the department of Meurthe-et-Moselle
- Saint-Firmin, Nièvre, a commune in the department of Nièvre
- Saint-Firmin, Saône-et-Loire, a commune in the department of Saône-et-Loire
- Saint-Firmin-des-Bois, a commune in the department of Loiret
- Saint-Firmin-des-Prés, a commune in the department of Loir-et-Cher
- Saint-Firmin-sur-Loire, a commune in the department of Loiret
