= Hannah Firmin =

English illustrator and printmaker

Hannah May Firmin (born 24 March 1956) is an illustrator and printmaker. She is notable for illustrating the book covers of Alexander McCall Smith's The No. 1 Ladies' Detective Agency series for which she was awarded "Book Cover of the Year" at the British Book Awards 2004.

== Biography ==
Firmin is the second daughter of Peter Firmin, co-creator with the late Oliver Postgate, of the children's television programmes Pingwings, Pogles' Wood, Noggin the Nog, Ivor the Engine, Clangers and Bagpuss. She grew up in Blean, Kent, before moving to London to attend Chelsea College of Art, and then The Royal College of Art in 1981. Since then she has worked as a freelance illustrator for books, magazines, newspapers and for advertising and design companies.

In 2004 Firmin was awarded the award for "best book cover" at the British Book Awards for her work on Alexander McCall Smith's "The No. 1 Ladies' Detective Agency". She has illustrated the covers for the ten books in the series. With McCall Smith, Firmin has supported the literacy charity Book Aid International, donating an illustrated McCall Smith story for auction. She tends to work in the printing media, numbering among her influences the work of both Indian and African relief printers.

Firmin has two children and lives in Wales.
