= A. C. Cooper =

British department store

- Type: Private company
- Founded: 1918
- Founder: Augustus Charles Cooper
- Services: Fine Art Photography studio
- Website: www.accooper.com

A. C. Cooper is a British photographic company specialising in product, fine art and portrait photography established by the photographer Augustus Charles Cooper in 1918. The company was established at premises on Sandringham Park Road, West Hendon, London.

== History ==
A. C. Cooper was one of the first companies to focus on photographing artworks. A. C. Cooper has obtained three Royal Warrants. The company was 'famous for their photographic reproductions of Royal Academy pictures', and has photographed art on behalf of the Royal Society of Arts. Today, the company is based in both Colliers Wood, London, with studios on Bond Street, Mayfair.

== Augustus Charles Cooper ==
Augustus Charles Cooper was a photographer and the founder of A. C. Cooper. He was photographing actively in the twentieth century. His works include portrait photography held in the National Portrait Gallery collection in London, including portraits of NSW servicemen published in 1918–1919, a portrait of William Nicholson, and portraits of Winston Churchill. Cooper died in 1960.

== Courtauld Connects Project ==
Photographs contributed by A. C. Cooper to the Courtauld Institute of Art Conway Library are currently being digitised as part of the Courtauld Connects project.
