= Diego Monar =

Brazilian footballer (born 1989)

Personal information
- Full name: Diego Monar Firmino Martins
- Date of birth: 14 February 1989 (age 37)
- Place of birth: São Vicente, Brazil
- Height: 1.88 m (6 ft 2 in)
- Position: Centre back

Team information
- Current team: Real Noroeste

Youth career
- –2009: Santos

Senior career*
Years	Team	Apps	(Gls)
2009–2013	Santos	0	(0)
2009	→ Portuguesa Santista (loan)		
2011	→ Inter-SM (loan)		
2013–2014	Monte Azul		
2014	Olímpia		
2015	Francana	12	(1)
2017–	Real Noroeste	2	(1)

International career
2007	Brazil U18		
- * Club domestic league appearances and goals as of 2 February 2018

Diego Monar Firmino Martins (born 15 February 1989), commonly known as Diego Monar, is a Brazilian footballer who plays for Real Noroeste as a centre back.

== Career ==
Born in São Vicente, São Paulo, Diego Monar joined Santos' youth academy in 2002, aged just thirteen.

On 20 February 2008, Diego Monar and Santos agreed to a contract extension that would see the player stay with the club until Fbebruay 2013.

=== Career statistics ===
(Correct as of October 16, 2010)

Club	Season	State League		Brazilian Série A		Copa do Brasil		Copa Libertadores		Copa Sudamericana		Total	
Club	Season	Apps	Goals	Apps	Goals	Apps	Goals	Apps	Goals	Apps	Goals	Apps	Goals
Santos	2009	0	0	0	0	0	0	-	-	-	-	0	0
Portuguesa Santista (loan)	2009	0	0	-	-	-	-	-	-	-	-	0	0
Santos	2010	0	0	0	0	0	0	-	-	-	-	0	0
Inter de Santa Maria (loan)	2011	0	0	0	0	0	0	-	-	-	-	0	0
Santos	2011	0	0	0	0	0	0	-	-	-	-	0	0
Total		0	0	0	0	0	0	-	-	-	-	0	0
