= House of Benney =

UK-based silversmith and jeweller

House of Benney Limited
- Company type: Private limited company
- Industry: Goldsmith; Silversmith; Jeweller
- Founded: 1950
- Founder: Gerald Benney
- Key people: Simon Benney (CEO)
- Website: houseofbenney.com

House of Benney, sometimes known simply as Benney, is a UK-based silversmith and jewellery business. It is used by various members of the British royal family.

== History ==
The business was founded in 1950 by the silversmith and goldsmith Gerald Benney, who through the company was one of the first British craftsmen to hold four royal warrants simultaneously. During this period Benney became famous for the textured effect which is today called "Benney Bark", which came about by accident when he inadvertently used a hammer with a damaged head and like what was produced. The company also produced a number of commissions such as The Commonwealth Mace, as well as pieces for Mikhail Gorbachev, Margaret Thatcher and George & Barbara Bush, alongside the formal dining set at 10 Downing Street which is still in use today (having been commissioned by The Silver Trust).

Simon Benney, Gerald's son, took over the business in the 1990s, and he still holds the Royal Warrant of the King as Gold and Silversmiths. Today, Benney Partnership continues to produce some of the world's finest silver, gold and enamelware.

The company was the subject of a 2016 BBC Four documentary titled Handmade: By Royal Appointment, a series which followed CEO Simon Benney and three different royal warrant holders, namely Wedgwood, John Lobb Shoes and Steinway.

== Notable works ==
- For Ruby Jubilee of Elizabeth II in 1992, Gerald Benny designed and manufactured The Commonwealth Mace. This was presented to the Queen by the Heads of the Commonwealth to celebrate the fortieth anniversary of her accession to the throne. It is used annually to this day, where it is carried into the Commonwealth Day service at Westminster Abbey ahead of the monarch. It featured in a special Antiques Roadshow Royal Treasures in May 2023 in a feature with Baroness Scotland antiques expert Geoffrey Munn who said “I never dreamt of being shown such an enormous expanse of 18-carat gold decorated with rubies and enamel”. It weighs 5000g and alongside the rubies, it displays the flag of each Commonwealth member country, with Munn also describing it as "most marvellous tribute to her majesty’s reign and a lovely thing to see".
- In 2012, the year of the Diamond Jubilee of Elizabeth II and the London Olympics, Simon Benney collaborated with House of Fabergé on the company's first silver collection to be launched since the Russian Revolution, with Simon hand-crafting silver and enamel tumblers and shot-glasses in various vibrant colours.
- "Ten enamelled silver beakers" was created in 2006 by Simon Benney, and came to auction at Bonhams with an estimate of £15,000 - £20,000. They are a set of ten slightly curved beakers with a narrow polished band and gilded insides, and enamelled outsides in ten different colours.
- Simon Benney created The Three Graces, a candelabra which took over two years to create, and is the most valuable modern silver commission since the Second World War with an estimated value from Bonhams of between £250,000 and £300,000.
- Simon Benney designed and, through his online jewellery business House of Benney sells, the NHS Pendant made of silver and enamel from which all profits are donated to NHS Charities Together.
- In addition, the Victoria & Albert Museum holds 32 objects or drawings by Gerald & Simon Benney, which includes cigarette boxes, teapots, cutlery and ornaments.
