= Gerald Benney =

British goldsmith and silversmith (1930-2008)

- Born: Gerald Adrian Sallis Benney; 21 April 1930; Kingston-Upon-Hull, England
- Died: 26 June 2008 (aged 78)
- Occupation(s): Silver and goldsmith
- Spouse: Janet Edwards (m. 1957)
- Children: 4, including Simon Benney and Paul Benney

Gerald Adrian Sallis Benney CBE (21 April 1930 – 26 June 2008) was a British silver and goldsmith who along with David Mellor and Robert Welch popularised stainless steel designs in post-war British homes. Like Mellor and Welch he was influenced by modern Scandinavian design and in particular Georg Jensen.

== Early and family life ==
He was born in Kingston-Upon-Hull on 21 April 1930. His father, Ernest, was the principal of a local art school and his mother was a silversmith. The family moved when his father became the principal of Brighton College of Art. He attended Brighton, Hove and Sussex Grammar School and studied at Brighton College of Art from 1945 under Dunstan Pruden. He began his national service in 1948. He began attending the Royal College of Art in 1950.

In 1957 he married journalist Janet Edwards in Sherborne St John. They had a daughter and three sons.

== Career ==
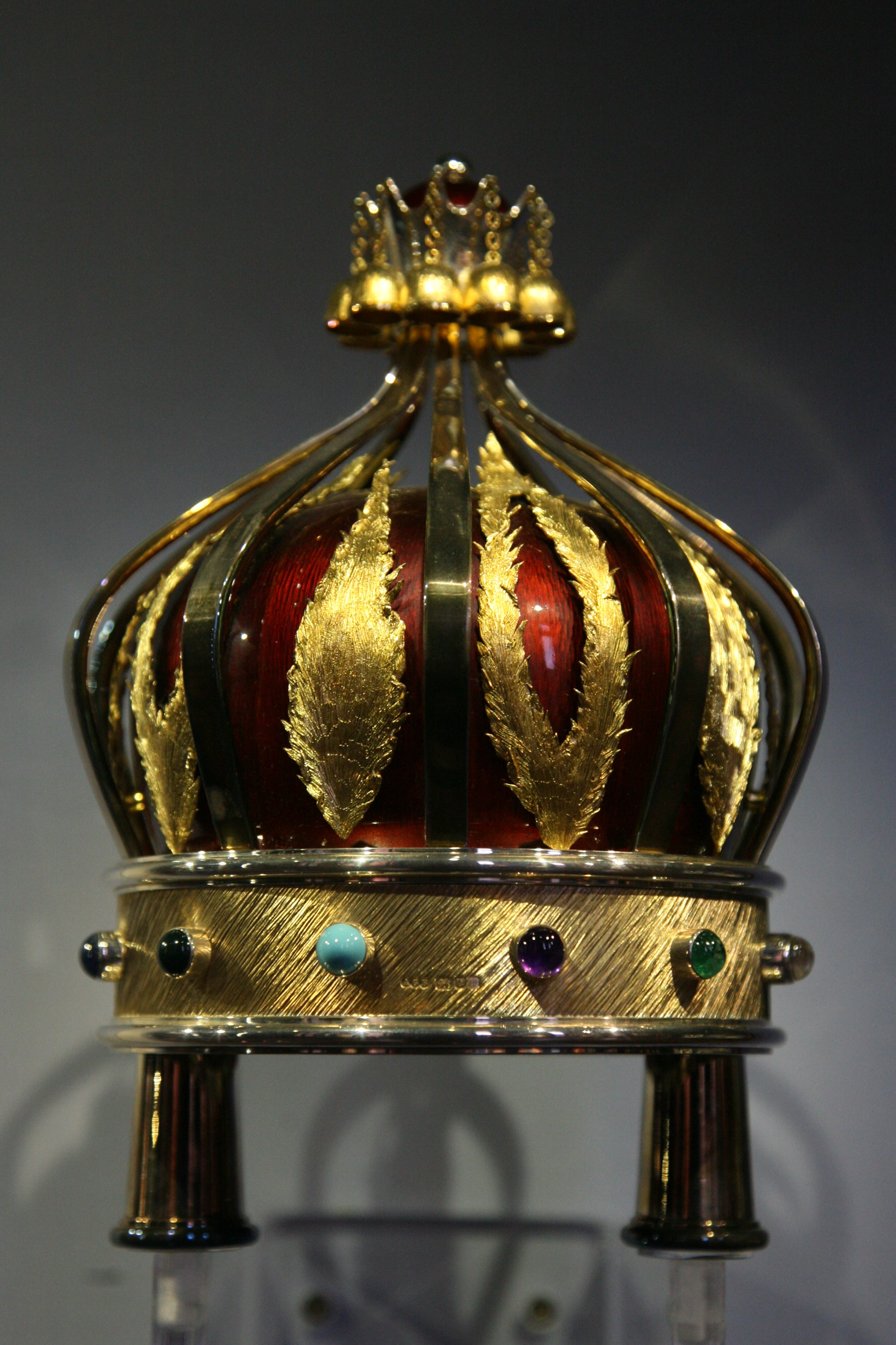
Torah crown in the Victoria and Albert Museum

In 1952 he founded the House of Benney. He was the first British craftsperson to ever hold four Royal Warrants at the same time. The modern Scandinavian style Gerald developed was taught to him by Berger Bergensen.

Among his works are the altar plate for Coventry Cathedral and ceremonial maces for five English universities, and three in Australia (University of New England (1956); University of Newcastle (1966); and Flinders University (1969)). The Victoria and Albert Museum has a number of his pieces in its collection. He also created cutlery for Viners.

He was appointed a Commander of the Order of the British Empire (CBE) in the 1995 New Year Honours, "for services to art".

His son Simon Benney (born 1966) now runs the business; he has also held four Royal Warrants simultaneously. An older son, Paul Benney (born 1959), is an artist.

He died on 26 June 2008.
