= Paul Benney =

British artist

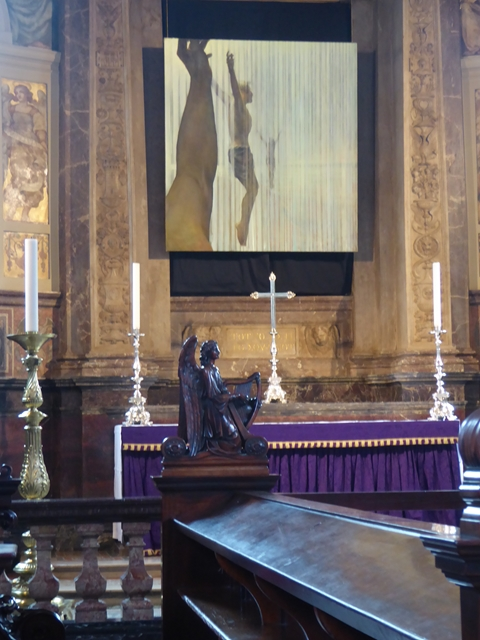
"Crucifixion" by Paul Benney in St Marylebone Parish Church

Paul S. Benney (born 30 May 1959 in London) is a British artist who rose to international prominence as a contemporary artist whilst living and working in New York in the 1980s and 1990s in the UK as a portraitist.

Benney's work is held in the 20th century collection of The Metropolitan Museum of Art, The Brooklyn Museum, The National Portrait Gallery, London, The National Gallery of Australia, and many prominent corporate and private collections around the world. Paul Benney's portraiture and contemporary work have been featured in news, radio and documentaries on the BBC and Channel 4.

Paul Benney exhibited his multimedia installation, 'Speaking in Tongues' during the 57th Venice Art Biennale in 2017.

As of 2019 Benney had been collaborating with the multi-instrumentalist Nitin Sawhney to compose and produce individual soundscapes for the digital artworks that Benney has recently released with online digital gallery Sedition. The works are a digital hybrid.

== Early life and family ==
Benney was born in Chelsea but spent the majority of his childhood in Beenham in west Berkshire. His father, Gerald Benney (1930 – 2008), was a notable silversmith who created gold and silver flatware and jewellery for private and public collections around the world including for the British Royal family. His younger brother, Simon Benney (born 1966), is also a silversmith and goldsmith.

== Career ==
Paul Benney is a self-taught painter. He moved to New York in 1982 and was a member of the N.Y. downtown Neo-Expressionist group in the 1980s. He was first taken by the P.P.O.W. Gallery in 1984 where he created immense monochromatic painting depicting mysterious dream imagery with surfaces built up of layers feather twigs, dirt and gel.

Benney's East Village contemporaries while living in New York included Kiki Smith, David Wojnarowicz, Jean-Michel Basquiat, Ross Bleckner, Richard Hambleton, Adam Fuss and Craig Coleman.

Paul Benney moved back to the United Kingdom in 1988 where his portrait practice grew rapidly by word of mouth. He has since exhibited in ten BP Portrait Award Exhibitions and twice won the BP Visitors’ Choice Award in 1996 and 1997 and received a commendation for the portrait ‘My Daughters' in 1999. In 2003 Benney was commissioned by the Board of Trustees of the Tate Gallery to paint Jack Dellal in recognition of his support of the gallery. He exhibited at the Birch & Conran in 1988, the Nigel Greenwood Gallery in 1991, the Long & Ryle Gallery in 1995. In 2013 he was asked to judge of the Threadneedle Prize at the Mall Galleries, UK.

Benney's portrait subjects have included Queen Elizabeth II, Sir Mick Jagger, John Paul Getty III, Alexander Thynn, 7th Marquess of Bath, Lord Weidenfeld, Baroness Amos, The State Portrait for Israel, Lord Rothschild, Ben Barnes (for the portrait in the feature film Dorian Gray in 2009) Fergus Henderson, Adam Fuss, Justice Stephen Breyer, Sarah Lucas, The Duchess of Bedford, Jerry Hall, Nitin Sawhney, The Viscountess of Weymouth, Sir Paul Hamlyn, and Lord Sainsbury. In 2015 Benney was commissioned by Prince Charles to paint WWII veteran Brian Stewart for the Royal Collection.

Benney was invited to be a resident artist at Somerset House in 2010. During his five year residency he held the show ‘Night Paintings’ in 2012 which explored themes that deal more with the subconscious and metaphysical world and drew over 15,000 visitors. In 2017 Paul Benney exhibited his multimedia installation 'Speaking in Tongues' in the Church of San Gallo during the 57th Venice Art Biennale.

For the coronation of Charles III and Camilla in 2023, Benney was selected by Queen Camilla to paint her state portrait. The portrait was unveiled to the public on 6 May 2025, at the National Gallery in London, before being permanently moved to the Throne Room at Buckingham Palace.
