= Firmin Djidingar =

Chadian politician

Firmin Djidingar (born 1944, in Koulaka) was a Chadian politician. He was elected to the National Assembly of Chad in the December 1969 election.
