= Iamdra Fermín =

Dominican TV hostess, actress, singer (born 1984)

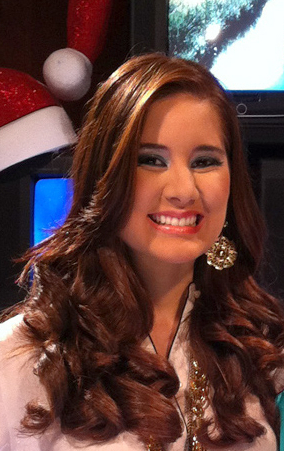
- Born: Iamdra Fermín Hernández; December 3, 1984 (age 41); Santo Domingo, Dominican Republic
- Years active: 1992–present
- Presenting career
- Show: Iamdra
- Station: TeleAntillas (Channel 2)
- Network: Grupo de Medios Corripio
- Time slot: 2012–present
- Show: Iamdra Full
- Station: TeleAntillas (Channel 2)
- Network: Grupo de Medios Corripio
- Time slot: 2003–2012
- Website: iamdra.com

Iamdra Fermín Hernández (born December 3, 1984), known simply as Iamdra, is a Dominican TV hostess, emcee, and actress. Fermín is recognized as one of the youth icons in the Dominican television. At end of 2013, she announced to go to Spain to study communications.

== Early life and family ==
Iamdra Fermín was born in Santo Domingo, Dominican Republic. Her mother, Blanca Hernández, is a television producer and journalist during the 1980s and early 1990s. Her grandfather, Hugo Hernández Llaverías, was one of the first Dominican announcers.

Fermín graduated summa cum laude in marketing at the Ibero American University and has an "MBA Essentials" from the Pontificia Universidad Católica Madre y Maestra. Also, she is general manager of TV Educa Productions S.A., a TV producing company chaired by her mother.

== Career ==
The first appearance of Fermín on Dominican television happened with she just being eight months old, was on a TV commercial in the mid-1980s. Iamdra's career officially began in 1992 making commercials, and sporadic appearances in children's segments for several television shows including her mother's.

Her career gained prominence in 1995 when he joined the children's program "Topi-Topi" by Radio Televisión Dominicana, standing out as the main presenter. There she lasted for about five years as a member. The program is registered as one of the most successful in Dominican history. In 2001, Fermín conducted her first program: "Conecta con Iamdra" (Connect with Iamdra); and later she led programs music videos "La Vellonera" (The Jukebox) and "Top Ten" by Mango TV.

From 2003 to 2012, Fermín led "Iamdra Full" by Tele Antillas one of the most successful juvenile programs in the country ever. In 2013, the program was renamed from "Iamdra Full" to "Iamdra"; seeking a more mature image.

In 2014, Iamdra will do a Masters of Entertainment in Spain.
