= Firmin António =

Brazilian businessman

Firmin António is the president and founder of Accor group in Brazil.

After graduating with degrees in Economics and Management from the Conservatoire National des Arts et Métiers in Paris, Firmin António started working for Accor in 1968. In 1974, he created the Ticket Restaurant subsidiary in Portugal, before setting up the Brazilian subsidiary, Ticket Serviços in 1976, marking Accor's entry into the Brazilian market. Today, Firmin Antonio heads Accor Brasil, a joint venture between Accor, Brascan and Espírito Santo, and Accor Hotels in South America. He is also Chairman of the Boards of GRSA (a joint venture with Compass Group International), Dalkia Brasil (a joint venture with Veolia Environment), CWT Brazil and Accor TOP (a joint venture with Espírito Santo Viagens).
