= Barnard & Westwood =

British Stationery Production Company

Barnard & Westwood is a British printing and bookbinding company. Its primary business is the production of bespoke stationery products for both individuals and businesses, based on traditional techniques and tools. Based in London, the company holds royal warrants of appointment granted by Queen Elizabeth II (1986) and the Prince of Wales (2012), and is a regular supplier of products and services to the British Royal Family.

== History ==
The company was founded by Albert Reginald Barnard, originally a hotel printer who was unable to return to his previous occupation after he was injured in World War I. He approached his aunt, Miss Westwood, for financial backing, and set up his own print shop in 1921.

Over the years, the company's reputation has grown to the point where it numbers St Paul's Cathedral, Westminster Abbey and Sotheby's among its clients, as well as luxury goods brands such as LVMH Moët Hennessy. In 2012, the company printed the invitation cards, table plans and orders of service for the Royal Wedding between Prince William and Catherine Middleton; in 2013, it printed programmes for Margaret Thatcher's funeral and the Queen's coronation anniversary service. In 2021 the company printed the Order of Service for the Funeral of His Royal Highness The Prince Philip, Duke of Edinburgh.
