= Firmin & Sons =

British military uniform manufacturer

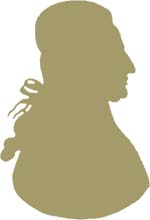
Samuel Firmin, Esquire. Proprietor 1754 to 1796.

Firmin & Sons is a British company, founded in 1655, that manufactures and supplies military ceremonial buttons, badges, accoutrements, and uniforms. They are one of the oldest companies in the UK and is now based in Birmingham.

== History ==
Thomas Firmin was born in Ipswich, Suffolk in 1632 and was apprenticed to The Girdlers Company the makers of belts both for fine dress and for utility. The account records of the Master and Wardens of the Girdlers survived the Great Fire of London. There is an entry in the accounts for the year 1653/54 of Thomas Firmin paying six shillings for the half year. By this time he appears to have completed his apprenticeship as he is listed amongst the yeomen of the company for that year. Upon completion of his apprenticeship he is known to have set up in business on his own, in premises at Three King's Court, off Lombard Street, in the Langborne Ward in the City of London.

By the account year for The Girdlers Company 1655/56 Richard Overston is Master and John Taylor Renter Warden. Thomas Firmin's business is such that the account records show that John Taylor receives a sum of two pounds and six shillings in the year aforesaid for the presentment of George Robotham, his apprentice for eight years. The business can therefore be said to have been established by this date of 1655.

By the year 1661/62, the accounts show that Thomas Firmin has moved up in seniority within The Girdlers' Company, possibly joining the assistants as he is no longer listed further down as yeoman.

Firmin was a philanthropist who established many work support schemes for the poor of London. This included providing work for Huguenot and other refugees settling in and around London. Firmin was appointed a governor both of Christ's Hospital and of St Thomas's Hospital. He was elected an early member of the Royal Society, having been proposed by Robert Hooke personally.

Out of the ashes of the Great Fire of 1666, Thomas Firmin continues his business in the City eventually rebuilding parts of Three Kings Court.

The previous established date of 1677 is in the trade directory of that date "The List of Merchants for the City of London", a copy of which is also held in Guildhall Library. Following the discovery of several entries in this Ancient Livery Company's manuscript records, the establishment date of 1655 can now be adopted (manuscript references have been given and are available for public scrutiny).

Through the reigns of sixteen British monarchs, Firmin & Sons at the age of 362 years (in 2017), can be said to be the oldest manufacturing company and is one of the 10 oldest established companies in the United Kingdom and is among the 500 oldest companies in the world.

After Wilkinson Sword stopped producting swords in 2005, Firmin & Sons began sponsoring the Sword of Peace award.
