= David Mellor (designer) =

English designer and manufacturer (1930–2009)

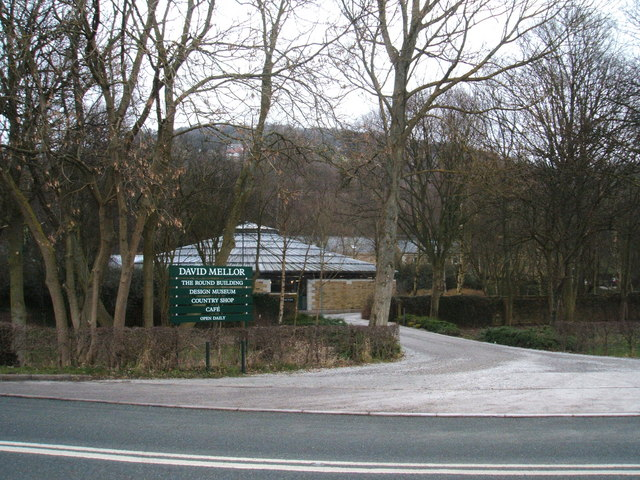
- The former Hathersage gas works which was converted into the David Mellor cutlery factory
- Born: David Rogerson Mellor; 5 October 1930; Ecclesall, Sheffield, West Riding of Yorkshire, England
- Died: 7 May 2009 (age 78)
- Occupation: Designer
- Known for: Design for bus shelters, cutlery, and the traffic lights system
- Spouse: Fiona MacCarthy
- Children: 2

David Rogerson Mellor CBE FCSD RDI (5 October 1930 – 7 May 2009) was an English designer, manufacturer, craftsman and retailer.

Regarded as one of the best-known designers in Britain, Mellor specialised in metalwork and especially cutlery. He also produced many other designs, including for bus shelters and the traffic light system in use across the United Kingdom, British Crown Dependencies, and British overseas territories.

== Early life and training ==
Mellor was born in Ecclesall, Sheffield, where his father was a toolmaker for the Sheffield Twist Drill Company. From the age of eleven, Mellor attended the Junior Art Department of Sheffield College of Art, receiving an intensive training in craft skills. He made his first piece of metalwork – a sweets dish – at this early age.

He studied at the Royal College of Art in London from 1950. Mellor's first cutlery, "Pride", designed while he was still a student, is still in production. Mellor also studied at the British School at Rome.

== Silversmithing ==
Returning to Sheffield, Mellor set up a silversmithing workshop-studio making one-off pieces of specially commissioned silverware. His work included a collection of modern silver tableware commissioned by the government for British embassies in a drive to give Britain a more forward-looking image.

== Industrial design ==
Alongside silversmithing, Mellor was stimulated by the relatively new design potential of stainless steel. His "Symbol" cutlery, manufactured from 1963 at Walker & Hall's purpose-built modern factory at Bolsover in Derbyshire, was the first high-quality stainless-steel cutlery to be produced in quantity in the UK. Mellor was subsequently commissioned by the government to redesign standard issue cutlery for canteens, hospitals, prisons and the railways, reducing the traditional 11-piece place set to five pieces and thereby reducing costs.

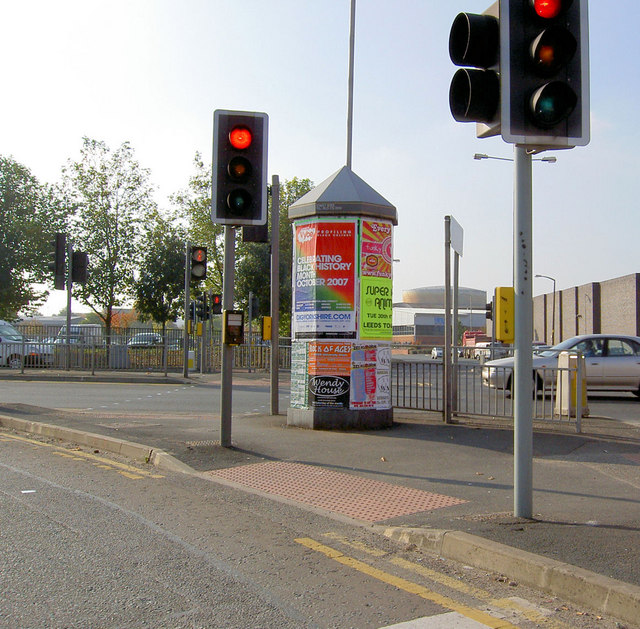
The traffic light system Mellor designed for across the United Kingdom, Crown Dependencies Isle of Man, The Channel Islands, and the British overseas territories since 1965.

Mellor worked for the Midlands engineering firm Abacus Municipal on the design of street lighting, bus shelters, public seating and litter bins. Around 140,000 of his bus shelters having been installed since they were first produced in 1959. In 1965 as part of the Worboys Committee, he was commissioned by the Department of the Environment to redesign the national traffic light system as part of an overhaul of traffic signs. Mellor's redesigned traffic lights are still in use.

== Manufacturing ==
In 1973 Mellor made the decision to begin manufacturing his own cutlery designs. To house his factory he renovated a large historic mansion, Broom Hall, in central Sheffield. The building was then derelict. The machines were moved into the extensive Georgian wing. The conversion of the building received a European Architectural Heritage Award. As well as introducing new concepts in cutlery he rethought the traditional methods of production. Workers in the Sheffield cutlery industry had up to then specialised in a single operation, but he introduced a new system whereby his cutlery makers rotate from task to task, increasing job satisfaction through a sense of involvement in the project.

In 1990, Mellor finally realised a long-held ambition by commissioning a new purpose-built cutlery factory designed by Michael Hopkins. This factory, known as the Round Building, was built on the circular foundations of the redundant village gas works at Hathersage in the Peak District National Park, 12 miles from Sheffield.

== Retailing ==
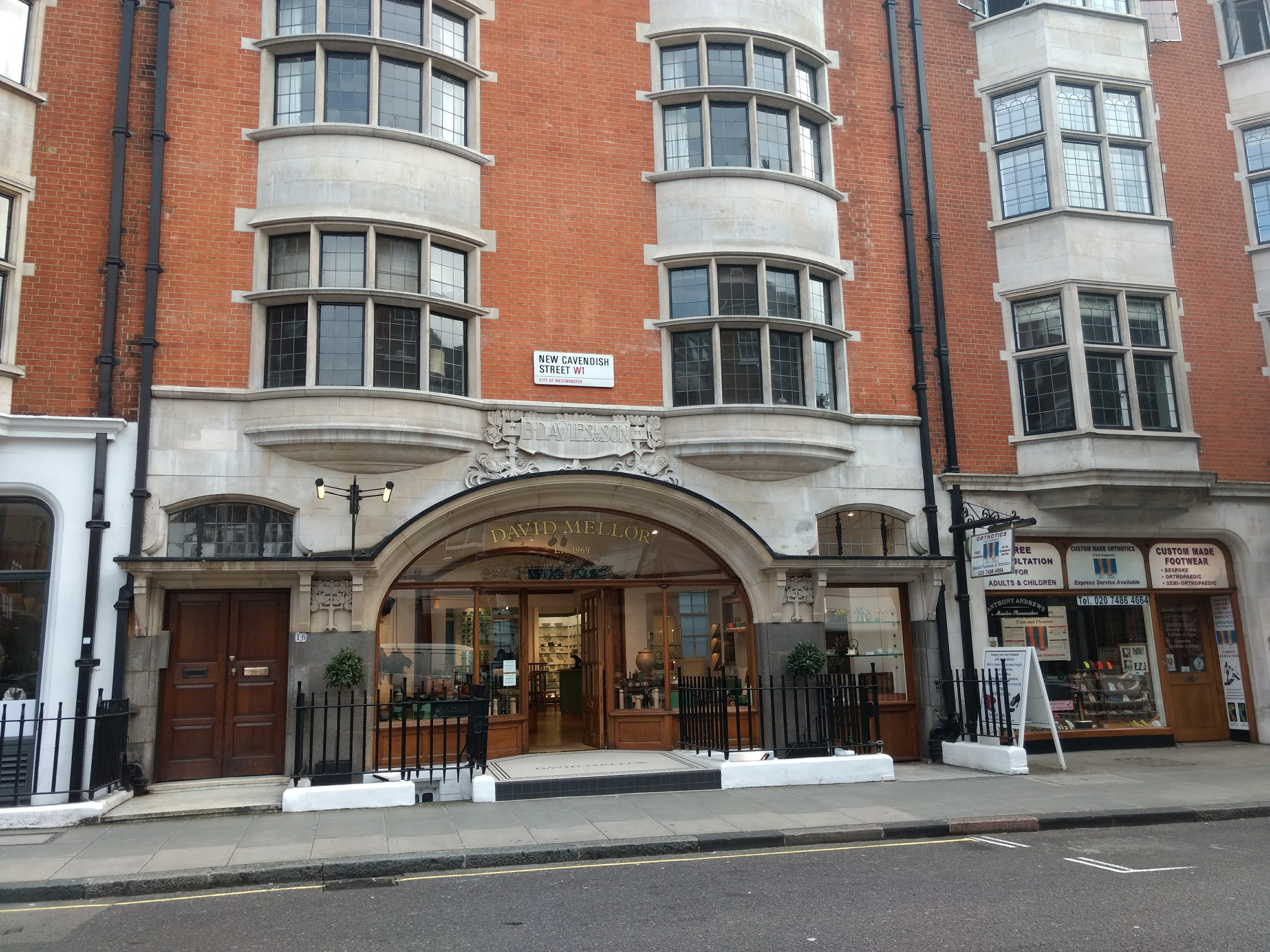
David Mellor shop in Marylebone, London

The first David Mellor shop opened at 4 Sloane Square, London, in 1969. It was followed by shops in James Street, Covent Garden; King Street, Manchester; and 22 Shad Thames, Butlers Wharf, London (since closed). A shop and a design museum was opened in Hathersage, alongside the Round Building factory in 2006.

== Public work and honours ==
Mellor was the youngest Royal Designer for Industry, elected in 1962 at the age of 32. In the early 1980s he chaired the wide-ranging Design Council Committee of Inquiry into standards of design in Consumer Goods in Britain. He became Chairman of the Crafts Council in 1983 and a trustee of the Victoria & Albert Museum. He was awarded honorary doctorates from the University of Sheffield, De Montfort University, Sheffield Hallam University, Loughborough University and the Royal College of Art. In the 1981 Birthday Honours he was appointed an Office of the Order of the British Empire (OBE), and was promoted to Commander of the Order (CBE) in 2001.

A large-scale retrospective exhibition "David Mellor Master Metalworker" was held at the Design Museum, London, in 1996. There is a David Mellor Design Museum in a building alongside the cutlery factory at Hathersage..

== Personal life ==
Mellor retired from designing in 2005 at the age of 74. Mellor was married to Fiona MacCarthy, a biographer and cultural historian. They have two children, Corin (born 1966), product and interior designer, who is Creative Director of David Mellor Design; and Clare, a graphic designer with her own London practice. Mellor died on 7 May 2009 at the age of 78. His wife died in 2020.
