= 1921 in animation =

Events in 1921 in animation.

== Events ==
- June 28: Walt Disney and Ub Iwerks establish another animation studio, the Laugh-O-Gram Studio, which will last three years.

== Films released ==
- Unknown date:
  - The Centaurs (United States)
  - Rhythmus 21 (Germany) Completed this year, but not released until 1923.
- 8 January – The Hinges on the Bar Room Door (United States)
- 21 January – The Awful Spook (United States)
- 26 January – How I Became Krazy (United States)
- 6 February – Felix the Gay Dog (United States)
- 13 February – Down on the Farm (United States)
- 26 February – The Wireless Wire-Walkers (United States)
- 20 March:
  - Cleaning Up!!? (United States)
  - Kansas City Girls Are Rolling Their Own Now (United States)
  - Did You Ever Take a Ride over Kansas City Street 'in a Fliver' (United States)
  - Kansas City's Spring Clean-up (United States)
  - Felix the Hypnotist view (United States)
- 17 April – Free Lunch (United States)
- 8 May – The First Circus (United States)
- 15 May – Felix Goes on Strike (United States)
- 5 June – Felix Out of Luck (United States)
- 3 July – The Love Punch (United States)
- 17 July – Felix Left at Home (United States)
- 11 September – I Do (United States). Live-action film with an animated scene.

== Births ==
=== January ===
- January 5:
  - Tissa David, Romanian-American film director (Bonjour Paris, worked for UPA, Hubley Studios, R.O. Blechman), (d. 2012).
  - Monty Wedd, Australian comics artist and animator (worked for Artransa, Eric Porter and Ralph Bakshi, Hanna-Barbera, (d. 2012).
- January 16: Andre Le Blanc, Haitian-American-Brazilian comics artist and animator (worked for Hanna-Barbera), (d. 1998).
- January 17: Thomas Chastain, American author (co-wrote the story for The Simpsons episode "Black Widower"), (d. 1994).
- January 24: Peggy DeCastro, American singer (Bird and Animal voices in Song of the South), (d. 2004).
- January 31: Carol Channing, American actress and singer (voice of Grandmama in The Addams Family, Mehitabel in Shinbone Alley, Canina Lafur in Chip 'n Dale: Rescue Rangers, Muddy in Happily Ever After, Ms. Fieldmouse in Thumbelina, Fanny in The Brave Little Toaster Goes to Mars, Witch in the 2 Stupid Dogs episode "Red Strikes Back", Cornelia C. Contralto II in The Magic School Bus episode "In the Haunted House", herself in the Family Guy episode "Patriot Games"), (d. 2019).

=== February ===
- February 1: Peter Sallis, English actor (voice of Wallace in Wallace and Gromit and Rex the Runt, Rat in The Wind in the Willows and the narrator of Rocky Hollow), (d. 2017).
- February 17: Børge Ring, Danish animator, jazz musician and comics artist (Oh My Darling, Anna & Bella, Run of the Mill), (d. 2018).
- February 21: Zdeněk Miler, Czech animator, film director and illustrator (The Little Mole), (d. 2011).
- February 24: Abe Vigoda, American actor (voice of Sal Valestra in Batman: Mask of the Phantasm, himself in the Family Guy episode "The Kiss Seen Around the World"), (d. 2016).
- February 25: Roman Abelevich Kachanov, Russian animator (Cheburashka), (d. 1993).
- February 27: Yevgeniy Migunov, Russian film director, caricaturist, children's book illustrator, and animator (Karandash and Klyaska - Merry Hunters, Familiar Pictures), (d. 2004).

=== March ===
- March 4: John Ryan, English comics artist and animator (Captain Pugwash), (d. 2009).
- March 8:
  - József Romhányi, Hungarian writer, animation writer (The Gums, Kérem a következőt!) and translator (Hungarian dub of The Flintstones), (d. 1983).
  - Alan Hale Jr., American actor (voice of Skipper in The New Adventures of Gilligan and Gilligan's Planet), (d. 1990).
- March 15: Milt Stein, American animator and comics artist (Terrytoons, Fleischer Studios), (d. 1977).

=== April ===
- April 7: Bill Butler, American cinematographer (The Secret of NIMH, An American Tail), (d. 2023).
- April 9: George David Weiss, American songwriter (Fun and Fancy Free, Melody Time), (d. 2010).
- April 16: Peter Ustinov, English actor (voice of Prince John and King Richard in Robin Hood, and the title character in Dr. Snuggles), (d. 2004).

=== May ===
- May 3: Gordon Murray, English puppeteer, animator, and film and television producer (A Rubovian Legend, Camberwick Green, Trumpton, Chigley, Captain Pugwash), (d. 2016).
- May 27: Bob Godfrey, English animator (Roobarb, Noah and Nelly in... SkylArk, Henry's Cat, Great), (d. 2013).

=== June ===
- June 3: Emanuele Luzzati, Italian painter, illustrator, animator and film director (La Gazza Ladra, Pulcinella, Il Flauto Magico, I paladini di Francia), (d. 2007).
- June 17: Earl Hammond, American actor (voice of Mumm-Ra in ThunderCats, Mon*Star in Silverhawks), (d. 2002).
- June 28: David Weidman, American animator and poster designer (UPA, Hanna-Barbera), (d. 2014).

=== July ===
- July 6: Bill Shirley, American actor and singer (voice of Prince Phillip in Sleeping Beauty), (d. 1989).
- July 29: Chris Marker, French film director and animator (Les Astronautes), (d. 2012).

=== August ===
- August 14:
  - Audrey Geisel, American businesswoman, philanthropist, producer (Daisy-Head Mayzie, Horton Hears a Who!, The Lorax, The Grinch), and widow of Dr. Seuss, (d. 2018).
  - Bill Draut, American comics artist and animator (G.I. Joe), (d. 1993).
- August 28: Nancy Kulp, American actress (voice of Frou-Frou in The Aristocats), (d. 1991).

=== September ===
- September 5: Jack Valenti, American political advisor, lobbyist and president of the Motion Picture Association (voiced himself in the Freakazoid! episode "The Chip"), (d. 2007).
- September 15: Norma MacMillan, Canadian actress (voice of Sweet Polly Purebred in Underdog, continued voice of Gumby, Davey in Davey and Goliath and Casper the Friendly Ghost), (d. 2001).
- September 25: Eric Rogers, English composer, conductor and arranger (DePatie-Freleng Enterprises), (d. 1981).

=== October ===
- October 12: Art Clokey, American animator, director (Gumby, Davey and Goliath) and voice actor (voice of Pokey in Gumby), (d. 2010).
- October 17: Tom Poston, American actor (voice of Capital City Goofball in The Simpsons episode "Dancin' Homer", Ralph and Burly Man in the Aaahh!!! Real Monsters episode "O'Lucky Monster", Roy in the Rugrats episode "Hair!", Mr. Popper in the King of the Hill episode "Now Who's the Dummy?", additional voices in Liberty's Kids), (d. 2007).
- October 26: George Jackson, English animator (Watership Down, The Plague Dogs (film), Danger Mouse, The BFG), (d. 1986).
- October 29: Ed Kemmer, American actor (model for Prince Phillip in Sleeping Beauty), (d. 2004).

=== November ===
- November 1: Retta Davidson, American animator (Walt Disney Animation Studios, Chuck Jones, Ralph Bakshi), (d. 1998).
- November 2: Shepard Menken, American voice actor (voice of Clyde Crashcup in The Alvin Show, Tonto in The Lone Ranger, the Spelling Bee and Chroma the Great in The Phantom Tollbooth, the title character in Riki Tiki Tavi, Doctor Doom in Spider-Man and His Amazing Friends, Old Storyteller in Bugs Bunny's 3rd Movie: 1001 Rabbit Tales), (d. 1999).
- November 4: Billie Mae Richards, Canadian actress (voice of the title character in Rudolph the Red-Nosed Reindeer, Tenderheart Bear in The Care Bears), (d. 2010).
- November 8: Walter Mirisch, American film producer (The Pink Panther), (d. 2023).
- November 14: Brian Keith, American actor (voice of Uncle Ben in Spider-Man, Duckman's Father in the Duckman episode "Kidney, Popsicle, and Nuts"), (d. 1997).
- November 22: Rodney Dangerfield, American comedian (writer, producer, and voice of the title character in Rover Dangerfield, Rat-A-Tat-Tat in The Electric Piper, Larry Burns in The Simpsons episode "Burns, Baby Burns", himself in the Dr. Katz, Professional Therapist episode "Day Planner"), (d. 2004).

=== December ===
- December 5: Alvy Moore, American actor (voice of Grandpa Little in The Littles), (d. 1997).
- December 11: Liz Smith, British actress (voice of Mrs. Mulch in Wallace & Gromit: The Curse of the Were-Rabbit), (d. 2016)
- December 16: Toni Pagot, Italian comics artist, cartoonist and animator (Calimero), (d. 2001).
- December 18: John Myhers, American actor (voice of Hector Heathcote), (d. 1992).
- December 26: Steve Allen, American television personality, radio personality, musician, composer, actor, comedian and writer (voice of Bart Simpson's Electronically Altered Voice in The Simpsons episode "Separate Vocations", himself in The Critic episode "A Day at the Races and a Night at the Opera", The Simpsons episode "'Round Springfield", and the Pinky and the Brain episode "The Pinky and the Brain Reunion Special"), (d. 2000).
- December 27: James Whitney, American film director (Five Film Exercises, Lapis, Yantra), (d. 1982).

== Deaths ==
=== November ===
- November 3: Willis Robards, American actor, film director, and film producer (producer for the animated film series Mutt and Jeff), dies at age 48.
