= Freddie Phillips =

British musician and composer

Background information
- Born: 2 August 1919
- Died: 4 October 2003 (aged 84) Ewell, Surrey, England
- Genres: Classical
- Instrument: Guitar
- Years active: 1950s–1990s

Freddie Phillips (Frederick Phillips) (2 August 1919 – 4 October 2003) was a British musician and composer, best known for his work on television theme music, particularly the children's programmes, Camberwick Green, Trumpton and Chigley.

Mainly a classical guitarist, Phillips worked and performed in the fields of opera and ballet, including with The Royal Ballet, and with the BBC Symphony Orchestra. His television career began with providing musical scores for a pair of short films by Lotte Reiniger, and composing short pieces for use in television continuity. Around this time he began his involvement with the animator Gordon Murray, firstly with A Rubovian Legend, and later the Trumptonshire trilogy of children's TV programmes. Phillips wrote individual songs for the characters in the latter programmes for Brian Cant to perform, as well as the title music.

Phillips also provided many of the sound effects for the programmes, and was known for his experimental attitude towards creating the sounds he wanted, including use of an early multitrack recording system, reverb, and adjustment of tape speed to create different effects. Many of Phillips' recordings were made available as vinyl records, particularly the Trumptonshire and Rubovia series. Phillips died in Ewell, Surrey, in October 2003.

== Filmography ==
- Prince Achmed (1954 – revision of the original 1926 film by Lotte Reiniger)
- Hansel and Gretel (1955 animated film by Lotte Reiniger)
- The Gallant Little Tailor (1957)
- Peeping Tom (1960)
- Barbara Hepworth, a film by John Read (BBC) (1961)
- A Rubovian Legend or Rubovia (1955–60)
- Camberwick Green (1966)
- Man in a Suitcase (1967 – one episode The Man Who Stood Still)
- Trumpton (1967)
- Chigley (1969)
- The Gublins (1977)
