= The Gublins (TV series) =

British children's TV series (1977–1979)

- Also known as: The Gublin Legends
- Created by: Gordon Murray
- Country of origin: United Kingdom
- No. of series: 1
- No. of episodes: 13

Production
- Running time: 5 minutes

Original release
- Network: BBC One
- Release: 24 December 1977 – 1978

The Gublins (also known as The Gublin Legends) is a stop-motion children's television show broadcast between 1977 and 1979. It was the final animated series made by British animator Gordon Murray, the creator of Camberwick Green, Trumpton and Chigley and was shown as part of the Saturday morning children's TV show Multi-Coloured Swap Shop on BBC One. Each episode was 5 minutes long with Murray introducing each one directly to camera.

The series related various folk tales told in verse. The Gublins themselves were chimp-like creations (the word "Gublin" is a pun on the humanoid creature "goblin") that featured in a series of Tall Stories, narrated in rhyming couplets to a simple acoustic soundtrack provided by Freddie Phillips.

== Episodes ==
There were thirteen episodes filmed although only twelve are known by name. The folk tales came from a variety of traditions, including Cornish, Bohemian and Arabic sources. The first episode, Obadiah and Flo, was broadcast on 24 December 1977. The named episode titles are:

- Obadiah and Flo
- Bessie O'the Glen (or the Inversneekie Doonie)
- The Barber of Cartina
- Mr Dilley's Mermaid
- The Prince Frog
- The Magic Tree
- The Kendal Candle
- The Emperor's Willow Warbler
- The Honey-Coloured Hat
- The Dancing Princess
- Charley's Feather
- The Prudent Prince

== Associated merchandise ==
Three of these stories appeared in the BBC Swap Shop Books (2,3 & 4) as photostories. There were also five photostory books published separately titled "Young Gublins Picture Storybooks". They were completely new stories called:

- The Lost Drum
- The Surprise Present
- The Wishing Well
- Grandpa's Mistake

A VHS entitled "Children's Seventies TV Favourites" featuring episodes of The Gublins was released by Contender studios in 1998.
