= Bura and Hardwick =

English animators

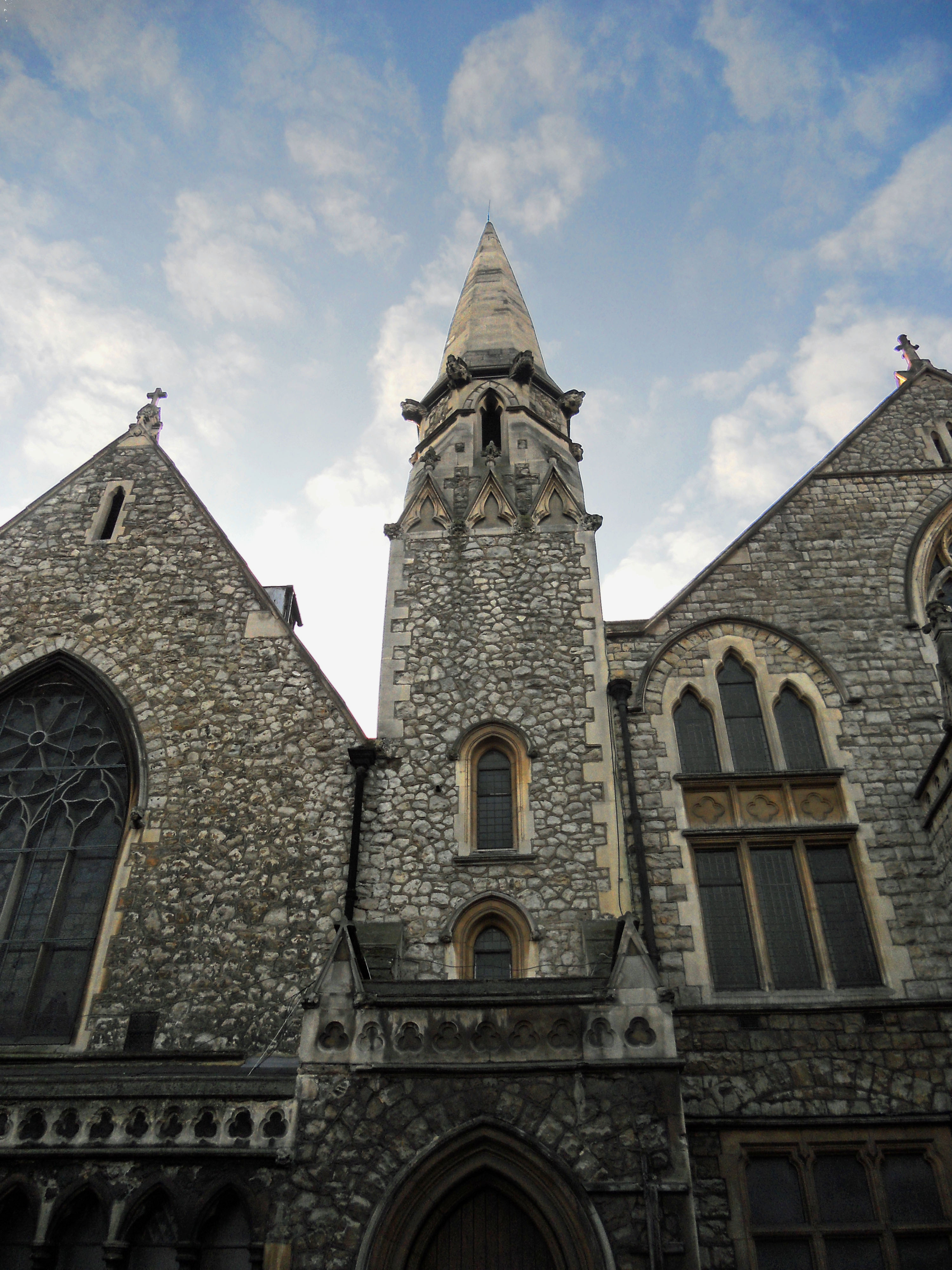
- The Church Studios at Crouch End, which Bura and Hardwick used as a studio in the 1980s before Dave Stewart and Annie Lennox of Eurythmics purchased it.
- Born: Barnett "Bob" Bura; 25 September 1924; Fitzrovia, London, England John Hardwick; 1 May 1937; Edgware, Middlesex, England
- Died: 7 April 2018 (aged 93); Somerset, England 24 September 2004 (aged 67); Somerset, England
- Occupations: Animators; Puppeteers
- Years active: 1955–1990
- Known for: Camberwick Green; Trumpton; Chigley; Captain Pugwash

Stop Motion Limited
- Type: Private limited company
- Industry: Animation
- Founded: 21 July 1971
- Founders: Bob Bura; John Hardwick
- Defunct: 5 December 2023
- Headquarters: Purley Way, Croydon, England

Bura and Hardwick was the name credited to represent the duo of Bob Bura and John Hardwick, who worked variably as puppeteers and animators in the United Kingdom. From the mid-1950s to the 1980s they contributed to a number of children's television series.

They are best remembered for their stop motion animations, most notably the Trumptonshire trilogy: Camberwick Green, Trumpton, and Chigley. The term "stop motion" was in fact the registered trademark of their company.

== History ==
In 1955, while Barnett "Bob" Bura and John Hardwick's sister were touring seasides with Punch and Judy shows, she became unavailable due to getting married, and recommended her younger brother to take over. The two created marionettes for the theatre, that performed at the Soho Fair. It was here where they viewed the original 1933 King Kong, inspiring them to want to create stop motion films. Their initial experiments took the form of animating pop music.

Later that year, they were asked to work at Lime Grove Studios, and began working for the Television Puppet Theatre under producer Gordon Murray. Usually working with marionettes, the two also operated rod puppets for eighteen adaptations of the Toytown stories by S.G. Hulme Beaman. In 1962 Bura and Hardwick began their long association with BBC Schools, providing animations for them as well as for other BBC productions; including Blue Peter. The Puppet Theatre was closed in 1963 alongside the Children's Department by Sydney Newman, who used the Theatre's former studio space to film special effects for his creation Doctor Who. However, the two soon found themselves once again working under Murray, creating the animation for Camberwick Green, the inaugural instalment of the Trumptonshire trilogy. The trilogy was all animated in their recently acquired homemade studio in Womersley Road, Crouch End.

During the 1970s and 1980s, the studio's work was said to have been credited frequently within a single week's edition of the Radio Times. According to Bob Bura, the BBC ensured that they would remain in work; most of their filmography was produced for the corporation. In the early 1980s, Bura and Hardwick moved from Womersley Road to what would become the Church Studios, but due to pressure from the local council (owing to the way it was then operated), they had to sell part of it, which ended up going to Dave Stewart and Annie Lennox of pop group Eurythmics. Here they were able to complete their album Sweet Dreams, which propelled them to international success. In 1984 they purchased the studio from the animators.

A while later, the BBC decided to cut their ties with Bura and Hardwick, owing to the desire for a substantial increase in outsourced productions. This was done as a result of the Broadcasting Act 1990's requirements for at least 25% of its output to be sourced from independent companies, which would have doomed Bura and Hardwick's future careers; nonetheless they were hopeful that they would find a good sponsor to continue. Hardwick died in 2004, Bura in 2018.

== Techniques ==
Bura and Hardwick utilised many innovative filming techniques, which developed throughout their stop motion work.

The film cameras initially used exposed at twenty-four frames a second, so Bura modified them to operate at only a single frame. This allowed for smoother movement compared to other stop motion productions of the time, which was partially due to their desire to film one frame per movement, compared to two as other studios may have done. By the end of a given week Bura, Hardwick, and their team of assistants may have completed at least two minutes and 30 seconds of footage.

The puppets were fixed to a soft base with pins in between shots, which saved time as opposed to being screwed onto the animation table. In order to make sure that they would not be effected by the heat of the studio lights (as had happened during filming of Camberwick Green), later productions had further modifications made to the camera. As was utilised during the year-long production, certain props would be marked in ways that ensured they would be moved at a consistent level each shot. The episode PC McGarry features a smoke effect filmed in real-time, notable for the lack of motion for anything else in the sequence. This technique was further used in the first thirteen episodes of the 1972 stop motion version of the Toytown series.

Beginning in the mid-1970s, the studio devised a new technique: animating the background. A film would be reflected behind the puppets by a transit screen at a narrow angle, which necessitated another modification to the front camera. This was seen in various BBC Schools projects, including Bura and Hardwick's work for Words and Pictures. The term "stop motion" was originally the trademark of their company, Stop Motion Limited, referring to their productions. However, it became used to refer to all animation made using puppets moved by small increments, becoming perhaps better well known than the animators who coined it; a generic trademark.

At the request of Hardwick, Camberwick and the rest of the Trumptonshire trilogy was filmed in colour as opposed to black-and-white, requiring the first episode (Peter the Postman) to be reshot. This ensured a long period of repeats for the trilogy, in keeping with Bura's philosophy regarding their work together:

Everything we do, we do in a position that we think people will want to see it forever. That sounds terribly big-headed, but we thought that whatever it is we’re going to do is going to be seen. We knew that.

== Accolades and legacy ==
Bura and Hardwick's 1968 animation of Igor Stravinsky's Petrushka was well received, praised by the BBC as a highlight of that year, and by The Guardian as "by far the most imaginative British use of puppets one has seen on Television". Their 1978 production of The Nutcracker and the Mouse King won the BAFTA for Flame of Knowledge in 1979; "Making Shadow Puppets", a Merry-Go-Round episode they participated in, won the Minister of Post and Telecommunications Prize in Japan.

The animation style created by the studio for the Trumptonshire trilogy has been recreated and parodied numerous times: commercials for Windmill Bakery and Quaker Oats, appearances in the BBC's Future Generations, and pastiches in Life on Mars and the music video for Radiohead's 2016 single Burn the Witch. Confection, an episode of the detective TV series Endeavour, features several references to characters within the trilogy, as well as discussing one named "Rufus Bura" (ie Bob Bura).

== Filmography ==
=== As puppeteers ===
Year	Title	Notes	Ref.
1955-1964	A Rubovian Legend	29 episodes	
1956-1958	Toytown	18 episodes	
1956	The Bird of Truth	TV movie	
1956	The Holy Mice	TV movie	
1957	The Emperor's Nightingale	TV movie	
1957	Beauty and the Beast	TV movie	
1958	The Emperor's New Clothes	TV movie	
1959	The Petrified Princess	TV movie	
1959	The King of the Golden River	TV movie	
1960	The Crumpot Candles	TV movie	
1960	The Magic Tree	TV movie	
1960	The Balloon and the Baron	TV movie, special effects	
1961	Beauty and the Beast	Unrelated to 1957 production, 2 episodes, special effects	
1961	Great Captains	2 episodes, special effects	
1962	They Hanged My Saintly Billy	TV movie	
1962	The Dancing Princess	TV movie	
1962-1963	Pops and Lenny	10 episodes	
1965-1966	Hey Presto! It's Rolf	9 episodes	

=== As animators ===
Year	Title	Notes	Ref.
1962	Air, Land, and Water	First project for BBC Schools, 3 episodes	
1963	Blue Peter	3 episodes	
1965-1966	Merry-Go-Round	4 episodes	
1966	Camberwick Green	13 episodes	
1967	Pinky and Perky's Island	Animators for first 4 episodes, puppeteers for next 9 (13 total)	
1967	Trumpton	13 episodes	
1967	The Furry Folk on Holiday	Short film	
1968	Petrushka	Short film for BBC Schools	
1969	Chigley	13 episodes	
1969	Mary, Mungo and Midge	Camera operators, 13 episodes	
1972	The Adventures of Sir Prancelot	Camera operators, 31 episodes	
1972	Larry the Lamb	13 episodes	
1973-1975	Doctor Who	Studio for model sequences, 9 episodes	
1974-1982	You and Me	90 episodes	
1974-1975	Captain Pugwash	Camera operators, 30 episodes	
1975-1990	Words and Pictures	58 episodes	
1978	Coppélia	Short films for Music Time	
1978	The Nutcracker and the Mouse King	Short films for Music Time	
1979	Lieutenant Kijé	Short films for Music Time	
1982	Dinosaurs: Fun, Fact and Fantasy	Direct-to-VHS	
1983	Sweet Dreams: The Video Album	Direct-to-VHS	
1984	Sleeping Beauty	Short film for Music Time	
