= Wivelsfield =

Village in East Sussex, England

Coordinates: 50.97°N 0.09°W

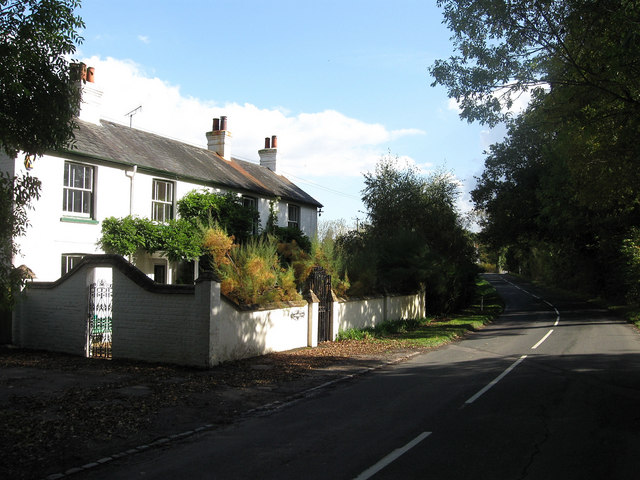
- Woodley House, South Road

- Location within East Sussex
- Area: 10.8 km^{2} (4.2 sq mi)
- Population: 1,980 (Parish-2011)
  - Density: 181/sq mi (70/km^{2})
- OS grid reference: TQ341204
  - London: 37 miles (60 km) north
- Civil parish: Wivelsfield
- District: Lewes
- Shire county: East Sussex
- Region: South East
- Country: England
- Sovereign state: United Kingdom
- Post town: HAYWARDS HEATH
- Postcode district: RH17
- Dialling code: 01444
- Police: Sussex
- Fire: East Sussex
- Ambulance: South East Coast
- UK Parliament: East Grinstead and Uckfield
- Website: Wivelsfield Parish Council

Wivelsfield (/ˈwɪvəlzˌfiːəld/) village and the larger adjacent village of Wivelsfield Green are the core of the civil parish of Wivelsfield in the Lewes District of East Sussex, England. The villages are 9.3 miles (15.0 km) north of the city of Brighton and Hove.

Wivelsfield parish is located on a ridge that acts as a watershed between the rivers Adur and Ouse. It lies south of Haywards Heath, and east of Burgess Hill, which are both comparative newcomer settlements, owing their existence to the coming of the railway in the 1840s. Wivelsfield is much older, and was first mentioned in an 8th century charter, whilst Bronze Age and Roman finds indicate even earlier origins of settlement in the area.

The settlements tended to be small farms often grouped together rather than a central village, and that is still marked by the two distinct areas called Wivelsfield and Wivelsfield Green, as well as smaller hamlets lying on the border of the old Haywards Heath to the north, Valebridge Common to the west and Ditchling Common to the south.

Despite Wivelsfield being as biodiverse as the best protected places in the Weald, it lies in a landscape without statutory protection, and county planners are allowing an eastward extension of settlements from Burgess Hill.

== History ==
Wivelsfield grew during the late Saxon and early Norman periods, initially as extended pastures for pannage for a number of manors to the south. The name is of Anglo-Saxon origin, meaning the field of a man named "Wifel". There is an 8th-century (c. 765) reference to the village as Wifelesfeld.

Although William de Warenne, son-in-law of the Conqueror, was listed in the Domesday Book of 1086 as the tenant-in-chief for many manors (including Hurstpierpoint) in the Rape of Lewes, to ensure commerce and unity the crown had placed some manors within the rape under the domination of other powerful lords. Part of the land that would become the parish of Wivelsfield was described as 1 1/2 hides at Berth in the ancient hundred of Streat (later named Street), then held by William de Braose. The eastern portion of Wivelsfield parish was part of Stanmer parish until the 14th century. Stanmer was owned by the Archbishop of Canterbury in 1066 and 1086.

Ote Hall Congregational Chapel was erected in 1780 by the Selina Hastings, Countess of Huntingdon, who lived at Great Ote Hall and had converted a room in the house into a chapel two years earlier. Great Ote Hall was the only manor in the area, with much southern land being in the manors of Plumpton and Ditchling.

In the 18th and early 19th centuries, Wivelsfield was the focus of a small group of local dissenters (Particular Baptists). In 1763, they broke from the larger General Baptist community at nearby Ditchling and formed a new meeting under Henry Booker, using a chapel built in 1780 (Bethel Strict Baptist Chapel) which remains in use. The surviving records and memorandum books, as well as Henry Booker's memoirs, provide insights into a small rural religious community of the period.

The growth of Haywards Heath during the late 19th century meant some urbanisation to the north on the old Wivelsfield portion of Haywards Heath common. This part along with the former St Francis Hospital built as a lunatic asylum in 1859 were transferred out of the parish in 1934.

== Notable buildings and areas ==
Notable areas around Wivelsfield

The village lies in the Low Weald and immediately north of the South Downs National Park, which extends to include Ditchling. The soil is clay and mixed sand on top of underlying clay and sandstone. Wivelsfield was one of the larger parishes in the county, although the growth of Burgess Hill to the west reduced the size of the ecclesiastical parish.

The north of the parish includes several woods and small farms south of Haywards Heath, separated from the nucleus of the village to the south by the Pellingford Brook, a tributary of the River Ouse that flows to Newhaven. Despite the influence of this brook, almost half of the parish drains west to the River Adur, which flows to Shoreham by Sea, reflecting the gently undulating terrain.

As a settlement originally based on droving, a number of ancient routes cross the parish. The current B2112 is an old drove road, as is a portion of the A272 which crosses the northern edge of the parish; whilst the minor road to Plumpton is a medieval highway. The B2112 also became part of an 18th century London-Brighton turnpike which is still used as the route for the modern day bike ride between the two.

=== Historic buildings ===
There are more than 20 listed buildings in the parish.

==== The Church of St Peter and St John the Baptist ====
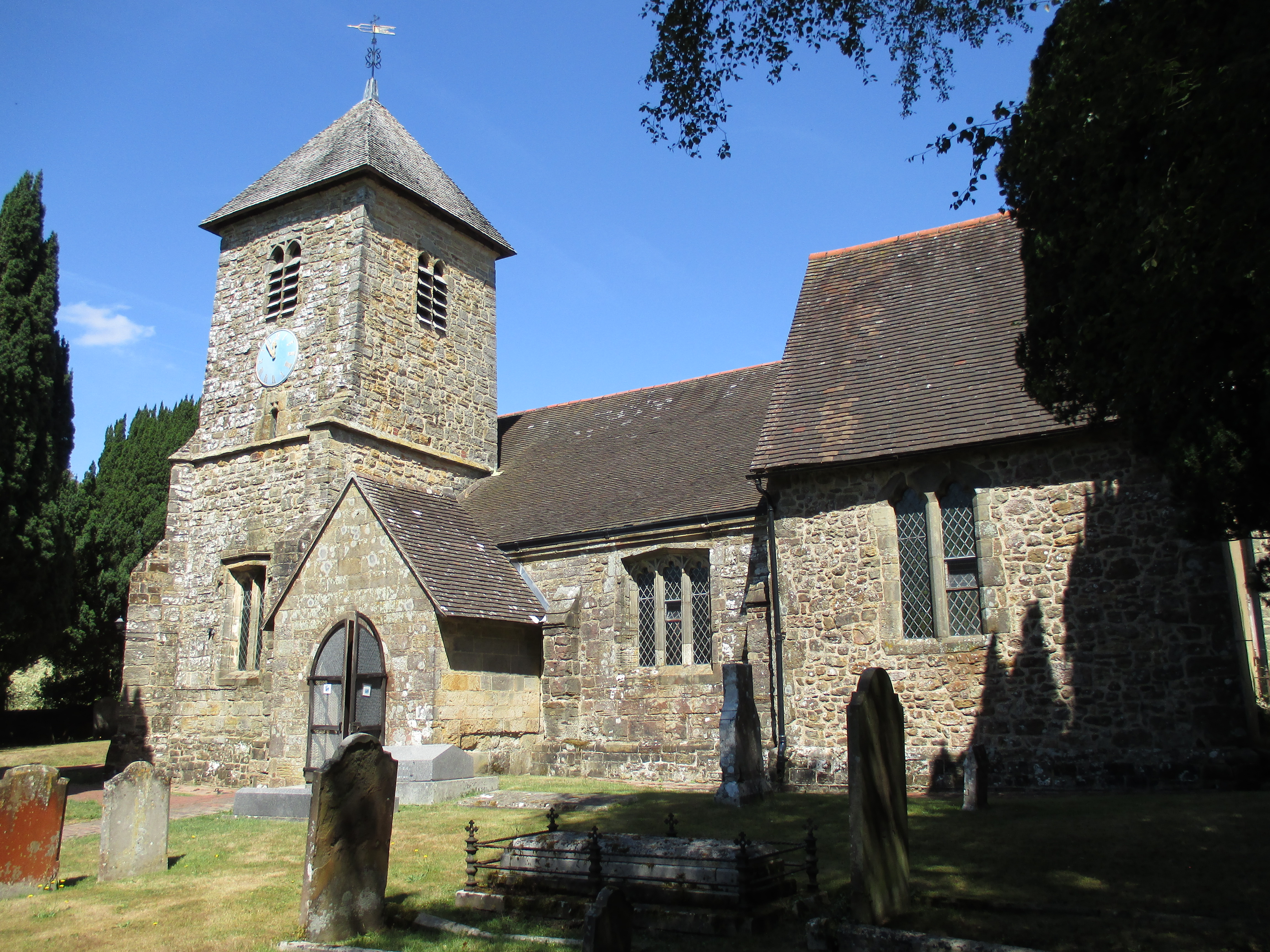
St Peter and St John the Baptist, Wivelsfield

Old Wivelsfield parish church (TQ 338 207) sits high on the Long Ridge's ancient east-west trackway that runs eastwards from Bedelands, past Theobalds, Antye, Lunces, and on beyond More Farm. It was built on the site of a wooden church and sits next to a thousand-year-old yew, which suggests earlier use as a pagan worship place. It was replaced by a stone building around 1050, although the area was then merely an outlier of Ditchling and did not become a parish in its own right until around the 12th century. As the area prospered during the Middle Ages the church was extended.

The sandstone rubble of Wivelsfield church is thought to have been quarried from adjacent Lunce's Common. The yew on the north side of the church (with only half of its trunk surviving) is probably the oldest thing on the site, perhaps marking a pre-Christian holy place. The church's dedication to St John the Baptist, whose midsummer (24 June) saints day was marked by hilltop bonfires, may represent continuity with the pagan solstice celebrations. The narrow north door is Saxo-Norman. It is a Grade II listed building.

==== Great Ote Hall ====
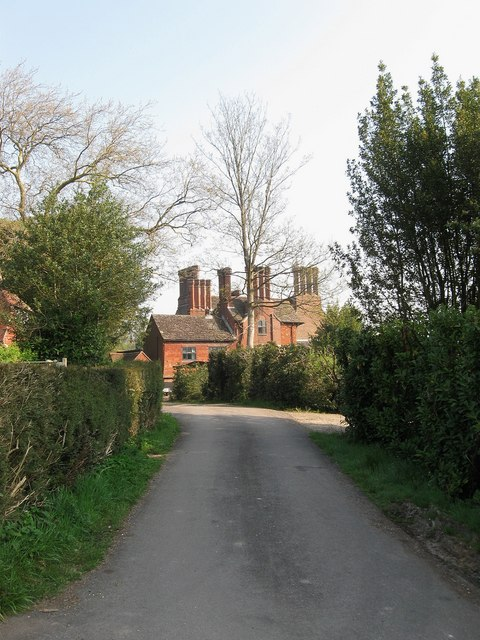
Great Ote Hall

In the southwest of the parish is Great Ote Hall (TQ 331 202). It is a grand, timber framed Tudor mansion and a grade I listed building, behind a screen of woodland. The east wing of the building was built around 1550. The west part of the building dates from 1600, though its history can be traced back to the 13th century. Between 1437 and 1537 the Hall was owned the Attree family. The current owners, the Irvines, of the 350 acre Great Ote Hall Estate also own the 180 acre Randolph Farm, at Hurstpierpoint.

==== Theobalds and Antye ====
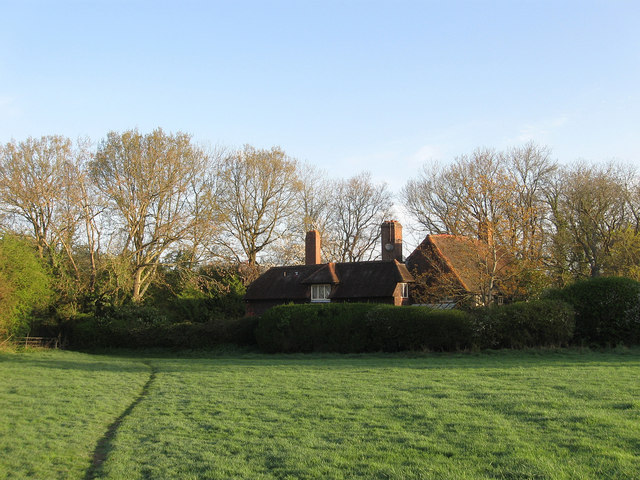
Antye House

In the far west, in the part that merges with the north of Burgess Hill by Wivelsfield Station, is Theobalds (TQ 325 206), a Grade II* listed building. It is of the 16th and 18th centuries, with a Horsham slab roof perhaps quarried on the farm, although there is thought to have been a settlement here since the Saxon period. Its rear wing is 17th century or older, and the main door is studded with the date 1627. The Attree family occupied the house from 1600 to 1823 after leaving Ote Hall.

Also in the far west is Antye (TQ 325 206). The Antye farm house has at its core a timber-framed hall house of circa 1400. Both Theobalds and Antye farms have field patterns that reflect their origin as an early cooperative farming community. Their countryside still retains a patchwork of tiny ancient woods and fields. They were sold off field by field as plots of land by the Ote Hall Estate in 1920, and the Valebridge Road and Janes Lane are ribbon developments.

=== Streams ===
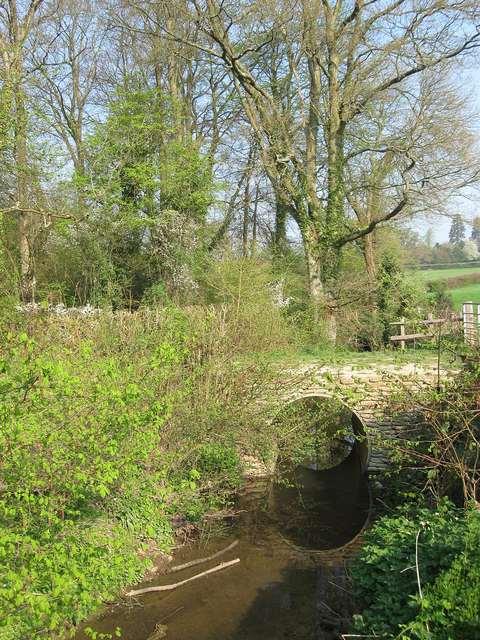
Bridge, River Adur

The Pellingford Brook, a tributary of the River Ouse, rises near Cleavewater Farm before heading east. It divides the parish and heavily influences its character. To the western side of the parish the eastern branch of the River Adur runs from its source on Ditchling Common. Unlike the streams straightened for mill leats, impoundments and drainage at Ote Hall and Antye, there remain stretches of low energy meanders where rare fish can still breed. Despite the influence of the Pellingford Brook, almost half of the parish drains west to the River Adur.

=== Countryside ===
The parish still retains its agricultural air. It still has many rich woodlands, much marshland and a number of green lanes. The growth of settlement within the parish has centred around Wivelsfield Green, which straggles along the road to Chailey's North Common. The area around the church, which was never very big, remains some distance away.

==== To the west ====
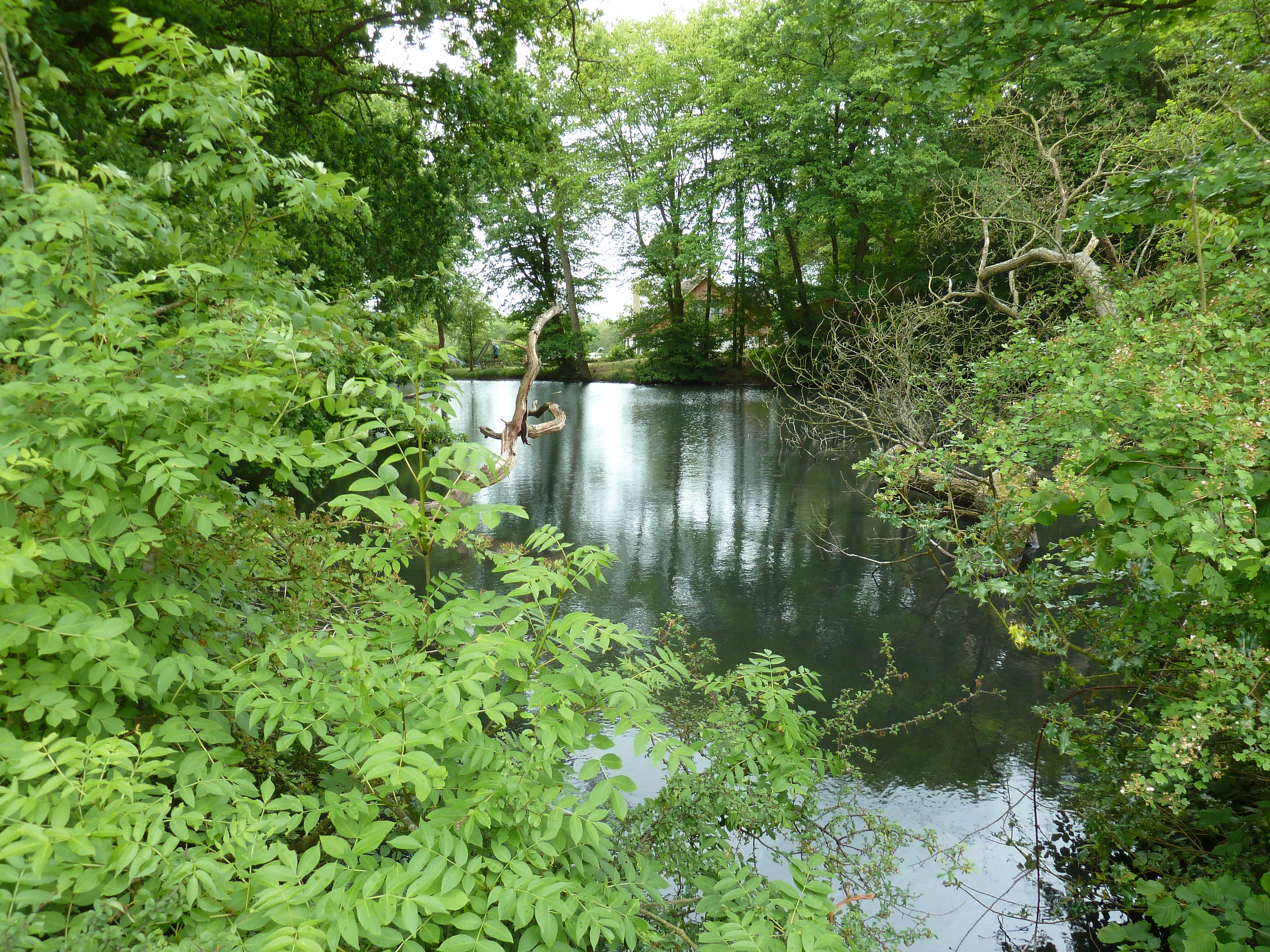
Pond next to Tilebarn Wood

A hornbeam-hedged green lane tracks north from Antye to Tilebarn Wood (TQ 330 210) a hornbeam coppice with bluebells and holly. The lane passes across the infant Adur to Fox Hill in Haywards Heath. North of Clearwaters Farm, the Wealden Clay gives way to sandstones, and the ground rises beyond ancient Kiln Wood (TQ 329 219) in Ansty to meet a new built development on the south edge of Haywards Heath, further squeezing the strategic gap between the mid Sussex towns.

==== To the north ====
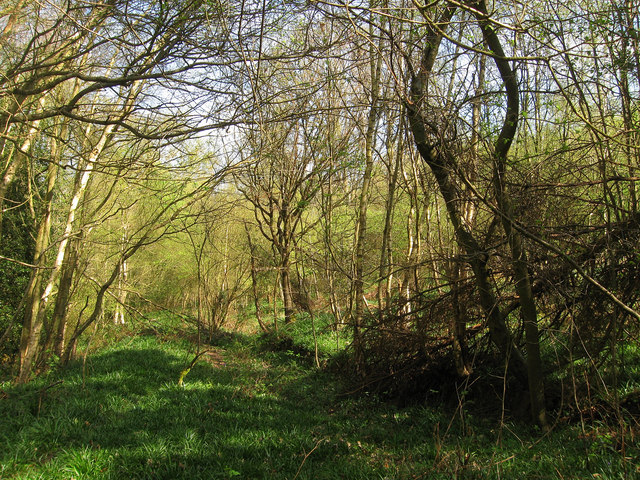
Old Track, Bankey Wood

Hurst and Bankey Woods (TQ 348 221) and Cains Wood (TQ 355 230) are biodiverse areas. Bankey Wood has brackeny glades where one might come across wintering Woodcock.

==== To the east ====
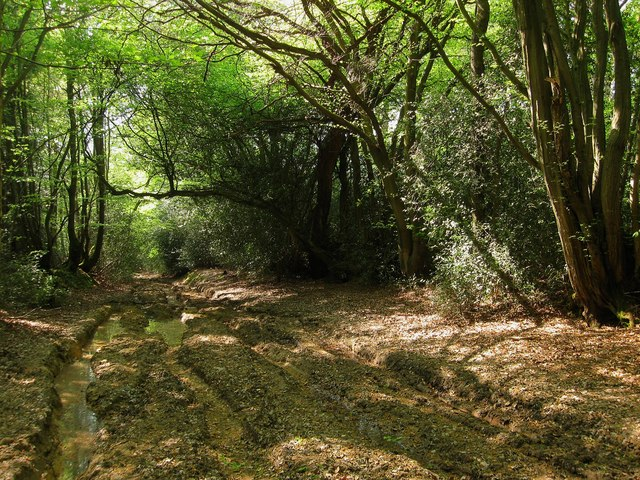
Colwell Lane

Both Colwell Lane (TQ 345 223) and Ham Lane (TQ 356 212) are greenways, often sunken, with lines of outgrown Hornbeam hedging stools. Around Ham Lane, Wilderness, Ham and Strood Woods, are old Stanmer manorial lands. They are wet woods where many of the old deciduous trees have been replaced by conifers. Only small fragments of ancient oak and hazel survive to the east under which bluebells grow. The relict, moor east and west of Slugwash Lane, north east of More House Farm, (TQ 353 215/6) has much meadowsweet in its enclosures, and brooks scented with water mint and noisy with marsh frogs (2011).

==== To the south ====
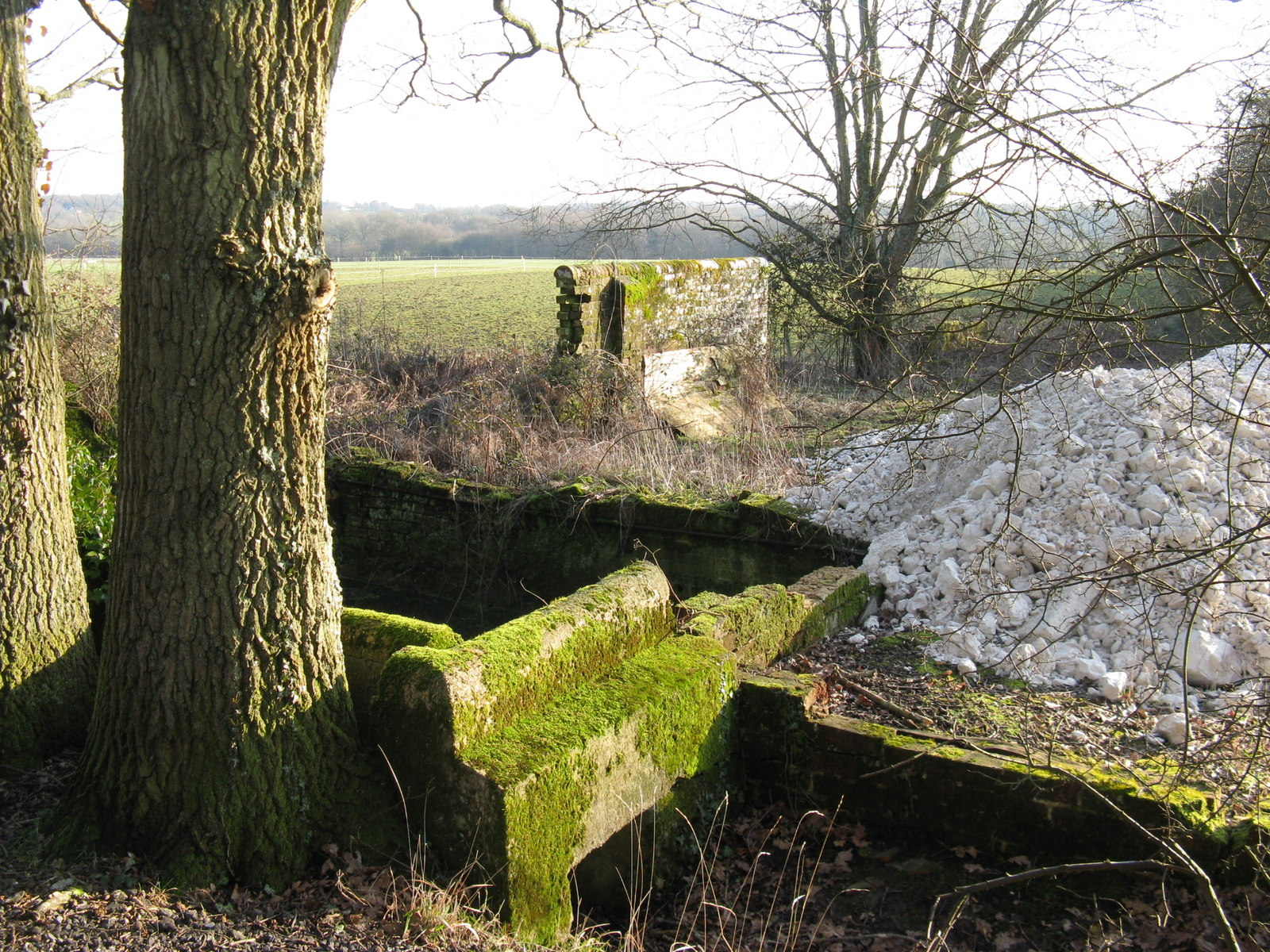
Ruins of Old Barn near Lashmar Wood

A patchwork of smallish woods and fields sit on the site of 'The Bishoprick', the lost Stanmer and Wivelsfield Common enclosed in 1626–30. Bounding West Wood, Hundred Acre Lane, part of an ancient south-north drove (TQ 347 189), tracks the watershed between the Adur and Ouse catchments for over a mile south from Wivelsfield Green. Lashmar Wood (TQ 350 193) is a wood rich in bluebells and wood anemones with a large old hornbeam boundary hedge. It used to be twice the size. What is left of Mercer's Wood (TQ 357 192), and little South Wallers Wood (TQ 354 189), are also rich bluebell woods, colourful in spring. Cottage Wood (TQ 355 185) and Lambourne Wood (TQ 356 187), are both the most biodiverse in the area, having around eleven indicator plants of ancient woodland. The area by the Lambourne brook is lusher and the bluebells bloom after they are gone on drier ground. It is another hornbeam wood, and there are Hedge Garlic, Goldilocks buttercup and Early purple orchids (2010). Cottage and Lambourne Woods are likely relics of the Fischhyrstes "Fish Wood" mentioned in the Saxon Stanmer charter.

== Amenities ==
The current village school was opened in September 2007. The logo, which stands at the front of the school, was designed by the school's pupils. The old school is now used for residential purposes; a nursery rents the Old Church Hall.

The village pub, which for years had been called the Cock Inn, was for a time renamed The Pear Tree. In December 2008, it was announced that the pub would be taken over by the owners of The Fountain in nearby Plumpton Green, who would attempt to revive the pub (once again named The Cock Inn) and the once lively centre of the village.

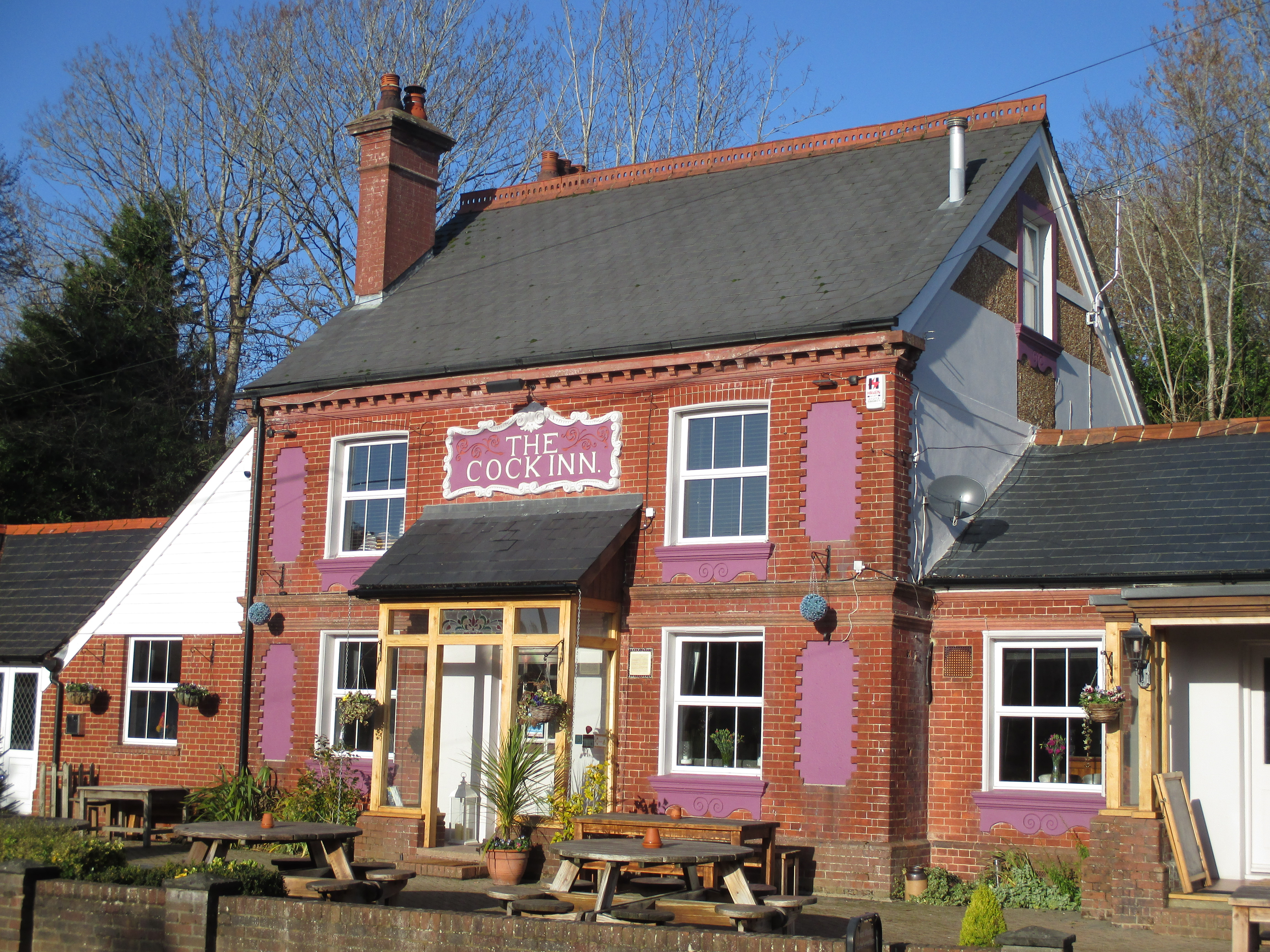
The Cock Inn

The village has its own theatre group, the Wivelsfield Little Theatre, which holds productions in the village hall and the church.

== Governance ==
Wivelsfield is governed at the local level by Wivelsfield Parish Council, which consists of nine councillors (currently eight, one vacancy), who meet monthly. The parish council is responsible for local amenities such as the provision of litter bins, bus shelters and allotments. They also provide a voice into district council meetings.

The next level of government is Lewes District Council. District councils supply services such as refuse collection, planning, leisure amenities and council tax collection.

Wivelsfield also elects a councillor every four years to East Sussex County Council, for the Chailey ward. The ward includes the parishes of Chailey, Ditchling, East Chiltington, Newick, Plumpton, St John Without, Streat and Westmeston. The County Council provides services such as roads and transport, social services, libraries and trading standards.

== Transport ==
Bus services are provided by a number of operators including Metrobus, Compass Travel and Seaford & District.

Wivelsfield railway station within Burgess Hill lies 1.38 miles (2.22 km) from the village by straight-line distance, or approximately 2.3 miles (3.7 km) on foot on some roads with no suitable pavements.

== In culture, media and sport ==
- The English folk singer Martin Carthy produced an LP record entitled 'Sweet Wivelsfield' released in 1974.
- The 1994 Tour de France's fourth stage, from Dover, went via London to Wivelsfield, ending in Brighton.
- Wivelsfield Green is reputed to be the inspiration for the 1960s children's television series Camberwick Green by Gordon Murray, (along with nearby Plumpton as Trumpton and Chailey as Chigley).

== Notable people ==
- William Rees Jeffreys — transport campaigner, lived in Wivelsfield, dying at Wivelsfield Hall in 1954
- Eric Roberts — an agent for MI5 and the Secret Intelligence Service, was born in Wivelsfield in 1907
