= The Official BBC Children in Need Medley =

Single by Peter Kay's Animated All Star Band
- Released: 21 November 2009
- Recorded: 2009
- Genre: Charity
- Length: 4:30
- Label: Sony
- Songwriters: Various Jackie Jackson, Michael Jackson, Christine McVie, A.R. Rahman, Sampooran Kalra, Tanvi Shah, Judith Abbott, Duncan Bruce, Paul Greco, Anne Holden, Darren Hamer, Nigel Hunter, Louise Watts, Allan Whalley, Gary Barlow, John Lennon, Paul McCartney, Guy Garvey, Craig Potter, Mark Potter, Pete Turner, Richard Jupp

Peter Kay singles chronology
"Once Upon a Christmas Song" (2008)	"The Official BBC Children in Need Medley" (2009)	"I Know Him So Well" (2011)

Children in Need singles chronology
"Do Ya/Stay with Me" (2008)	"The Official BBC Children in Need Medley" (2009)	"Love You More" (2010)

"The Official BBC Children in Need Medley" is a single by Peter Kay's Animated All Star Band. It is the official Children in Need Single for 2009, and was released on 21 November 2009. The song was shown for the first time on Children in Need 2009. The cover art is a parody of the cover of Sgt. Pepper's Lonely Hearts Club Band by the Beatles. The single has sold over 452,000 copies in the UK, earning it gold status from the BPI.

== History ==
According to a news interview, Kay conceptualised the single while working with animation director Tim Harper. Harper said that he would "love to do something like that" but he and Kay regarded it mostly as a joke.

After some time away from the subject, Kay brought it up again, this time with the actual intent to produce it. Tim Harper said that he and Kay "just sat down one lunchtime and wrote a list", with as many characters recorded on it as they could think of from their childhoods, as well as some modern favourites and US cartoon characters. The song was recorded at Hullabaloo Studios by the Voice and Music Company.

The project was carried out in top secret at the request of executive producer Kay. Celebrities and voice artists who voiced characters' original vocals were brought in without being told details of the project. When contacted by Cartoon Network Studios, Casey Kasem agreed to take part on the condition that Shaggy Rogers was shown to be a vegetarian and asked not to be given credit as he was officially retired.

The project took 5 and a half days to mix the vocals of the seven songs, eight months to animate, and around two years in total. Many of the original character models had been packed away, given to museums or cremated. Where possible the originals were found and transported to Chapman Studios in Altrincham from all over the world. In cases where the original models no longer existed, such as the characters from Camberwick Green and Trumpton, new copies of the original models were created.

Because permission was not given by Royal Mail to use their more up to date logo, Postman Pat's van was a modified design with only the number plate PAT 4.

The single raised at least £170,000 for Children in Need after more than 265,000 CD, DVD and download sales by mid-December 2009.

== Music video ==
The group perform the Beatles' number one hit, "Hey Jude" and Elbow's "One Day Like This".

The music video shows various British (and sometimes American) animated television series characters meeting and recording the song in a studio, spoofing other charity songs in the style of Band Aid's "Do They Know It's Christmas?", with Big Chris, the character voiced by Kay in Roary the Racing Car, first arranging the recording session and then leading the singing.

The music video features over 100 cartoon characters from different production companies. Nearly all of the characters with singing parts are voiced by their original UK voice artists including Ringo Starr (who was a member of the Beatles who recorded "Hey Jude", which is sung here) as Thomas the Tank Engine. Most of the contributions are stop motion characters. Some 2D animated characters appear on TV screens within the stop motion world "via satellite", including American cartoon characters Shaggy Rogers, Scooby-Doo, and Ben Tennyson. British cartoon characters Roobarb and Custard, Peppa Pig, George Pig and Muffin the Mule are also included. SpongeBob SquarePants and Angelina Ballerina appear on Big Chris' smartphone during the ending medley.

The video opens at night with Big Chris talking to Pat Clifton on the phone, saying he wants to get everyone together for the recording. In the morning, Bob the Builder sings The Jacksons' "Can You Feel It", joined by Postman Pat, Fireman Sam, the Teletubbies and other characters. Next, other characters, such as Station Officer Steele, Ted Glen, the Koala Brothers, The Wombles, Aloysius Parker, the Little Robots, and the Rubbadubbers, sing Fleetwood Mac's "Don't Stop". Fifi Forget-Me-Not sings The Pussycat Dolls' "Jai Ho", accompanied by Penny, Wendy, Marsha, Primrose, Big Christine and Nisha Bains, with Nisha's husband Ajay joining in, much to the disapproval and annoyance of Sam, Elvis, Steele, Pat, Bob, Big Chris, and Mr. Carburettor. Ajay then realizes his mistake and joins the men, accompanied by Parker, Virgil Tracy, and Brains, for their new rendition of Chumbawamba's "Tubthumping". The entire cast then sings a montage of Take That's "Never Forget", with Pingu and the characters of In the Night Garden... joining everyone for the concluding performance of the Beatles' "Hey Jude" and Elbow's "One Day Like This". At the end of the video, Chippy Minton appears, only to be informed by Big Chris that they have just finished.

=== Featured characters and voice actors ===
- Hit Entertainment/Mattel Television
  - Fireman Sam/Sam Tân
    - Fireman Sam Jones (voiced by Steven Kynman)
    - Firefighter Elvis Cridlington (voiced by Steven Kynman)
    - Station Officer Norris Steele (voiced by David Carling)
    - Firefighter Penny Morris (voiced by Tegwen Tucker)
      - Although the models from the fifth series were reused for this video mainly made up of stop-motion television characters, The Pontypandy Fire Service Team (Sam, Elvis, Steele and Penny) retained their voices from the recently established CGI series. So this is the only stop motion production featuring the Fireman Sam characters to have the CGI voice actors voicing them and not counting the Cartoonito Fireman Sam idents from 2008-2010, this is the last full stop-motion production to have the Fireman Sam characters officially, as the series had already transitioned to computer animation during that period.
  - Thomas & Friends
    - Thomas the Tank Engine (voiced by Ringo Starr)
    - Sir Topham Hatt
  - Bob the Builder
    - Bob the Builder (voiced by Neil Morrissey)
    - Wendy (voiced by Kate Harbour)
    - Spud (voiced by Rob Rackstraw)
    - Scoop** (voiced by Rob Rackstraw)
    - Pilchard**
  - Pingu
    - Pingu (voiced by Marcello Magni)
  - Rubbadubbers
    - Tubb (voiced by John Gordon Sinclair)
    - Terence (voiced by John Gordon Sinclair)
    - Finbar (voiced by Sean Hughes)
    - Sploshy (voiced by Maria Darling)
  - Angelina Ballerina: The Next Steps
    - Angelina Ballerina (voiced by Charlotte Spencer)
- Other incidental characters from Bob the Builder
  - Five unnamed photographers**
  - The cameraman**
  - The man at the mixing desk**
- ’’’NBCUniversal’’’
- Entertainment Rights
  - Woodland Animations Ltd:
    - Postman Pat
      - Postman Pat Clifton (voiced by Lewis MacLeod)
      - Jess**
      - Ajay Bains
      - Nisha Bains**
      - Mrs. Goggins (voiced by Carole Boyd)
      - Ted Glen (voiced by Ken Barrie)
      - Meera Bains*
  - Chapman Entertainment
    - Roary the Racing Car
      - Roary the Racing Car (voiced by Maria Darling)
      - Big Chris (voiced by Peter Kay)
      - Marsha** (also voiced by Maria Darling)
      - Mr. Carburettor (voiced by Tim Whitnall)
      - Rusty** (voiced by Dominic Frisby)
      - Flash** (voiced by Marc Silk)
      - Big Christine
      - Farmer Green (voiced by Tim Whitnall)
    - Fifi and the Flowertots
      - Fifi Forget-Me-Not (voiced by Jane Horrocks)
      - Mo**
      - Stingo (voiced by Tim Whitnall)
      - Violet (voiced by Maria Darling)
      - Bumble** (voiced by Marc Silk)
      - Primrose (voiced by Jane Horrocks)
      - Slugsy (voiced by Marc Silk)
      - Buttercup (voiced by Joanna Ruiz)
      - Daisy (voiced by Janet James)
      - Flutterby*
    - Raa Raa the Noisy Lion
      - Raa Raa the Noisy Lion**
        - Although the character appears in the video, Raa Raa the Noisy Lion did not actually premiere until 2011.
- Spellbound Entertainment Ltd
  - The Koala Brothers
    - Frank the Koala (voiced by Keith Wickham)
    - Buster the Koala (voiced by Rob Rackstraw)
- Create Media Ventures
  - Little Robots
    - Tiny (voiced by Hayley Carmichael)
    - Stretchy (voiced by Jimmy Hibbert)
    - Sporty
    - Scary (voiced by Mike Hayley)
    - Noisy
- BBC Worldwide
  - Muffin the Mule
  - The Woodentops
    - Daddy Woodentop
    - Mummy Woodentop
  - Flower Pot Men/Bill and Ben
    - Bill (voiced by John Thomson)
    - Ben (voiced by Jimmy Hibbert)
  - Andy Pandy
    - Andy Pandy
    - Looby Loo
    - Teddy
  - Children in Need
    - Pudsey Bear
- Ragdoll Productions/WildBrain
  - Teletubbies
    - Tinky Winky (voiced by Mark Heenehan)
    - Dipsy (voiced by John Simmit)
    - Laa-Laa (voiced by Nikky Smedley)
    - Po (voiced by Pui Fan Lee)
  - In the Night Garden...
    - Igglepiggle
    - Upsy Daisy
    - Makka Pakka
    - Tombliboos
    - Pinky Ponk**
- Cookie Jar Entertainment:
  - Paddington
    - Paddington Bear
  - The Wombles
    - Alderney** (voiced by Bernard Cribbins)
    - Orinoco (voiced by Bernard Cribbins)
    - Bungo (voiced by Bernard Cribbins)
    - Wellington (voiced by Bernard Cribbins)
    - Great Uncle Bulgaria*
- Entertainment One and Hasbro
  - Peppa Pig
    - Peppa Pig (voiced by Harley Bird)
    - George Pig (voiced by Oliver May and Alice May)
- ITV Studios International Media Limited
  - Thunderbirds
    - Virgil Tracy
    - Brains (voiced by Marc Silk)
    - Aloysius Parker (voiced by Marc Silk)
    - Lady Penelope Creighton-Ward
    - Alan Tracy*
    - Gordon Tracy*
    - Thunderbird 2*
- Smallfilms
  - Bagpuss
    - Bagpuss
- Cosgrove Hall Films Ltd
  - Engie Benjy
    - Engie Benjy
    - Jollop the Dog**
- Hanna-Barbera and Cartoon Network Studios
  - Ben 10: Alien Force
    - Ben Tennyson (voiced by Yuri Lowenthal)
  - Scooby-Doo
    - Scooby-Doo (voiced by Frank Welker)
    - Shaggy Rogers (voiced by Casey Kasem; uncredited)
- Nickelodeon
  - SpongeBob SquarePants
    - SpongeBob SquarePants
- Monster Animation & Design / A&B TV
  - Roobarb
    - Roobarb
    - Custard
  - Fluffy Gardens
    - Paolo the Cat
    - Mavis the Pony
    - Small Green Thing**
- ITV Studios
  - Rainbow
    - Zippy (voiced by Roy Skelton and puppeteered by Ronnie Le Drew)
    - George (voiced by Roy Skelton)
  - The Sooty Show
    - Sooty (voiced and puppeteered by Brian Sandford)
    - Sweep (voiced and puppeteered by Jimmy Hibbert)
    - Soo (voiced and puppeteered by Brenda Longman)
- Gordon Murray's Productions
  - Camberwick Green
    - Windy Miller**
  - Trumpton
    - Chippy Minton
    - Miss Lovelace**

Characters with an asterisk (*) after their names, appear on the album cover but not in the music video itself. Characters with two asterisks (**) after their names, appear in the music video but not on the album cover itself.

== Composition ==
The single is a medley of multiple songs played out in the following order:

1. "Can You Feel It" – originally performed by the Jacksons (1981) (0:00–1:08)
2. "Don't Stop" – originally performed by Fleetwood Mac (1976) (1:08–2:27)
3. "Jai Ho! (You Are My Destiny)" from the film Slumdog Millionaire – originally performed by A.R. Rahman and the Pussycat Dolls (2009) (2:12–2:41)
4. "Tubthumping" – originally performed by Chumbawamba (1997) (2:41–3:00)
5. "Never Forget" – originally performed by Take That (1995) (3:00–3:18)
6. "Hey Jude" – originally performed by the Beatles (1968) (3:18–4:30)
7. "One Day Like This" – originally performed by Elbow (2008) (3:37–4:30)

== Chart performance ==
The single entered the UK Singles Chart on download sales alone at number 18. On iTunes, the video was being downloaded almost three times as much as the single. Video sales are not included in the UK Singles Chart, so it was felt that the single might not chart as highly as expected, however it climbed to number one in its second week on the chart after it was released on CD and DVD. Although it peaked very highly on the UK Singles Chart, it peaked surprisingly low on the UK Downloads Chart, at number 30. The high physical sales of the single meant that it held off Jason Derulo's "Whatcha Say" in its first week and Rihanna's "Russian Roulette" in its second week. In its third week, the single dropped to number 2 after it was knocked off the number one spot by Lady Gaga's "Bad Romance". In the fourth week, the single fell to number 4 and then number 11 in its fifth week. In its sixth week, the song dropped 24 places to 35. The song entered the European Hot 100 at number 58; the next week it climbed 51 places to number 7, and peaked at number 5; the song then dropped to number 11 the next week. The song entered the Irish Singles Chart at number 25, then the following week the song moved up to 19, and peaked at number 6.

As of November 2016, the song has sold 452,000 copies in the UK.

== Track listing ==
CD single
No.	Title	Length
1.	"The Official BBC Children in Need Medley"	4:30
2.	"The Unofficial BBC Children in Need Medley"	4:09
Total length:		8:39

DVD single
No.	Title	Length
1.	"The Official BBC Children in Need Medley" (Video)	6:03
2.	"The Unofficial BBC Children in Need Medley" (Video)	5:11
Total length:		11:14

== Charts ==
=== Weekly charts ===
Chart (2009)	Peak position
Ireland (IRMA)	6
Scottish Singles Sales (Official Charts)	1
UK Singles (Official Charts)	1

=== Year-end charts ===
Chart (2009)	Position
UK Singles (Official Charts Company)	27

== Certifications ==
Region	Certification	Certified units/sales
United Kingdom (BPI)	Gold	452,000

== Release history ==
Region	Date	Label	Format
United Kingdom	21 November 2009	Sony	Digital download
United Kingdom	23 November 2009	Sony	CD, DVD
