= Dappledown Farm =

- Genre: Children's television series Puppetry; Educational
- Created by: Catherine Kirkwood and Nick Wilson
- Directed by: Adrian Hedley; Catherine Kirkwood; Nick Wilson
- Creative director: Nikky Smedley
- Voices of: Brian Cant; Marcus Clarke; Helena Smee; Sally Preisig; David Alan Barclay; Joe Greco; Katherine Smee; Dave Taylor; Tim Jones; Geoff Felix; Nick Wilson
- Composer: Peter Gosling
- Country of origin: United Kingdom
- Original language: English
- No. of series: 5

Production
- Production companies: Clear Idea Television; United Productions (1998–1999)

Original release
- Network: TV-am (ITV) (1990-1992); Channel 5 (1998–1999)
- Release: 11 March 1990 – 1999

Dappledown Farm is a British children's television programme, starring and presented by Brian Cant and a series of puppets. It began airing on 11 March 1990 on TV-am until 27 December 1992 and was originally broadcast on Sunday mornings. After TVAM's closure, the re-runs were broadcast on The Children's Channel in 1993 before it was later moved to Channel 5's Milkshake! in 1997 when the series got rebooted in 1998.

Despite the fact that production of the show stopped in 1999, it was still shown in repeats until November 2004.

In the show's narrative, Cant's character Brian was the owner of the Dappledown Farm. For each episode, he introduced feature cartoons from a studio farm set. For example, in the first episode, Brian told the story of animals on the farm that hatched from an egg such as birds, snakes, and tortoises. In addition to the puppets, the show also integrated stories that involve real-life animals.

== Puppet characters ==
Puppet characters in the show included: Dapple the Horse; Mabel the Cow; Stubble and Straw, the two mice; Columbus the Cockerel; Lucky Ducky; Colin the Coot; Millie the Moorhen; Fiona the Frog; and Harry the Heron. These characters had different personalities that range from mischievous to bashful. For this reason, there are times when they quarrel with each other and Brian the farmer served as the mediator.

The puppets were created by the Hands Up Puppets company.

== VHS ==
- Dappledown Farm 1: Water Everywhere & Columbus Under the Weather
- Dappledown Farm 2: Senses & Forgetful Brian
