= A Rubovian Legend =

British children's TV series (1955–1976)

- Genre: Puppetry (1955-1964); Stop-motion animation (1976)
- Created by: Gordon Murray
- Written by: Gordon Murray
- Directed by: Gordon Murray
- Voices of: Derek Nimmo; Violet Lamb; Roy Skelton; James Beattie; Pamela Binns; Raymond Rollett; Peter Hawkins; Philip Latham
- Theme music composer: Patrick Harvey (1958-1964); Freddie Phillips (1976)
- Country of origin: United Kingdom
- Original language: English
- No. of seasons: 3
- No. of episodes: 35

Production
- Producer: Gordon Murray

Original release
- Network: BBC1
- Release: 15 December 1955 – 22 March 1976

A Rubovian Legend is a British marionette children's television series created by Gordon Murray. It centres around a fictional kingdom ruled by King Rufus XIV and Queen Caroline, assisted by Albert Weatherspoon and the Lord Chamberlain.

The series received a live broadcast of its first episodes from 1955 to 1956. It was revived with recorded plays from 1958 to 1964. A remake of the series was broadcast in 1976, but it only lasted for six episodes.

== Premise ==
The show takes place within a small, fictitious kingdom named Rubovia, ruled by King Rufus XIV and Queen Caroline. Due to its small size, Rubovia is easily managed, with a chicken named Henrietta, who lays golden eggs, negating the need for high taxes. This means that the King and Queen can focus on problems created by Albert Weatherspoon, the latter of which is officially the Royal Gardner, tending to Queen Caroline's prized cabbages. Whenever Rufus needs him to entertain a visitor, such as King Boris of nearby Borsovia, or solve a problem, he creates most of the problems faced in each episode attempting to use magic.

Weatherspoon is also a keen inventor, having created the speaking tube, and any Royal Command, given by the Lord Chamberlain, that does not require use of magic will involve it. In those cases, Weatherspoon is not the cause of the problem, sometimes even being successful in solving it. These are usually caused by an Indian named MacGregor, who spends a lot of time outside the garden wall, plotting schemes for personal reasons. While Queen Caroline does not usually ask for Weatherspoon's help, she does dabble in various get-rich-quick plans of her own.

== Main characters ==
- King Rufus XIV (voiced by Raymond Rollett in the 1955 plays and Derek Nimmo from 1958 onwards, with Michael Logan standing in for episodes Something in the Air and The Secret River)- the fourteenth ruler of Rubovia, whose predecessors all shared the same name. He enjoys playing draughts with the Lord Chamberlain, to the anger of his wife.
- Queen Caroline (voiced by Violet Lamb)- the wife of King Rufus, who is usually quite assertive, although when in the company of her pet Chinese dragon Pongo, she is a lot calmer. She does not usually take part in ruling the kingdom, annoying her husband to do so, except during money-making schemes.
- The Lord Chamberlain (voiced by Philip Latham and then Peter Hawkins in the 1955 plays, and Roy Skelton from 1958 onwards)- the senior officer of the royal household, who also enjoys playing draughts with the King. He delivers royal commands and announcements, sometimes to a crowd of citizens.
- Albert Weatherspoon (voiced by Peter Hawkins in the 1955 plays and James Beattie from 1958 onwards)- officially the Royal Gardener for Queen Caroline's cabbages, although he assumes many other titles, including Court Photographer and, crucially, Royal Magician. Due to his busy days he cannot practice magic often, and so when he is required to use it, things usually go wrong. He is more successful as an inventor, however, having created the speaking tube.
- MacGregor - A rogue of the kingdom, who usually commits acts for financial gain. Originally a black Indian, in the 1976 series he was changed to a Native American for the 1976 series, due to a complaint received during the 1958–1964 series asking why the villain of the series was black.

== Production ==
Created by Gordon Murray, who wanted to break the mold of British puppet shows, the first four plays were transmitted live from 1955 to 1956. They featured the voices of Raymond Rollett, Violet Lamb and Peter Hawkins, with Philip Latham in the first play. Kim Allen designed the puppets used in this series, which were 1/5 in size, and they were operated by Audrey Atterbury, Bob Bura, John Hardwick, Molly Gibson, Elizabeth Thorndike and Joan Garrick. Each of these three plays had a different setting and costume designer, with Gordon Roland for the first, The Queen's Dragon, and Donald Horne for Clocks and Blocks. The third play, The Dragon's Hiccups, marked the debut of costume designer Andrew Brownfoot's involvement with the series, designing every subsequent episode, although not being the main designer for this play. After The Mystery of Rubovia Castle, Gordon decided to revamp, designing his own, 1/3 scale puppets.

In 1958 the first of twenty-five new, recorded plays were broadcast, sporadically running until 1964. Only Lamb reprised her voice role from the previous plays, with Derek Nimmo, Roy Skelton and James Beattie now providing voices. Puppeteers Gibson, Thorndike and Garrick also left, leaving Atterbury, Bura and Hardwick as the only three. Gordon would sometimes fund the plays himself if BBC budget was too low. Andrew based his model of Rubovia Castle from Bohemia and Moravia. During filming of the first of these plays, a remake of Clocks and Blocks, the castle prop was damaged by an electric cable. A twenty-sixth play, entitled The Giddy Ghost, was never broadcast, due to colour television being just a few weeks away, with the BBC abandoning many of its black-and-white programmes.

Like many BBC programmes of the 1950s and 1960s, little of A Rubovian Legend survives in the archive, save for a four-minute clip of the 1961 episode Knight for a Day which appeared in a 1988 episode of DEF II hosted by Stephen Fry.

== 1976 revival ==
In 1976, following the success of Gordon Murray's Trumptonshire trilogy, A Rubovian Legend was remade in a similar style, simply renamed Rubovia, and vastly watered down in its writing compared to its predecessor. Gordon himself, as well as Roy Skelton provided the voices. Although thought lost, all six episodes have shown up on YouTube from time to time. An LP containing the soundtracks of two episodes was released by BBC Records. It is rumoured the castle seen in Gordon's later series The Gublins is the same used here.

== Episodes ==
=== Series 1 (1955-1956) ===
No.	Title	Original release date
1	"The Queen's Dragon"	15 December 1955
2	"Clocks and Blocks"	19 April 1956
3	"The Dragon's Hiccups"	17 May 1956
4	"The Mystery of Rubovia Castle"	31 May 1956

=== Series 2 (1958-1964) ===
No.	Title	Original release date
1	"Clocks and Blocks"	28 October 1958
2	"The Dragon's Hiccups"	17 March 1959
3	"Mystery of Rubovia Castle"	26 May 1959
4	"The Wonky Wand"	8 December 1959
5	"Zaza Knows All"	24 May 1960
6	"Spray Fever"	9 August 1960
7	"Chickweed Wine"	4 October 1960
8	"Knight for a Day"	17 January 1961
9	"Crafty Art"	21 March 1961
10	"Fit and Well"	11 April 1961
11	"Something in the Air"	20 June 1961
12	"The Bell"	29 May 1962
13	"Gala Performance"	19 June 1962
14	"Bees and Bellows"	2 October 1962
15	"The Enchanted Duck"	16 October 1962
16	"The Trap"	30 October 1962
17	"The Clue"	1 January 1963
18	"A Cranky Banquet"	22 January 1963
19	"The Secret River"	29 January 1963
20	"Stop Press"	12 February 1963
21	"Fire, Fire, Fire"	13 August 1963
22	"Calling All Trunks"	19 November 1963
23	"The Troublesome Double"	3 December 1963
24	"Bewitched Boots"	17 December 1963
25	"A Sinister Visitor"	17 March 1964

=== Rubovia (1976) ===
No.	Title	Original release date
1	"The Unreliable Wand"	16 February 1976
2	"Dragon Doctor"	23 February 1976
3	"The Magic Scent Bottle"	1 March 1976
4	"The Magic Duck"	8 March 1976
5	"The Enchanted Clock"	15 March 1976
6	"Tunnel Trouble"	22 March 1976

== See also ==
- Trumptonshire
- Grand Fenwick
