= Brian Cant =

English actor, television presenter and writer (1933–2017)

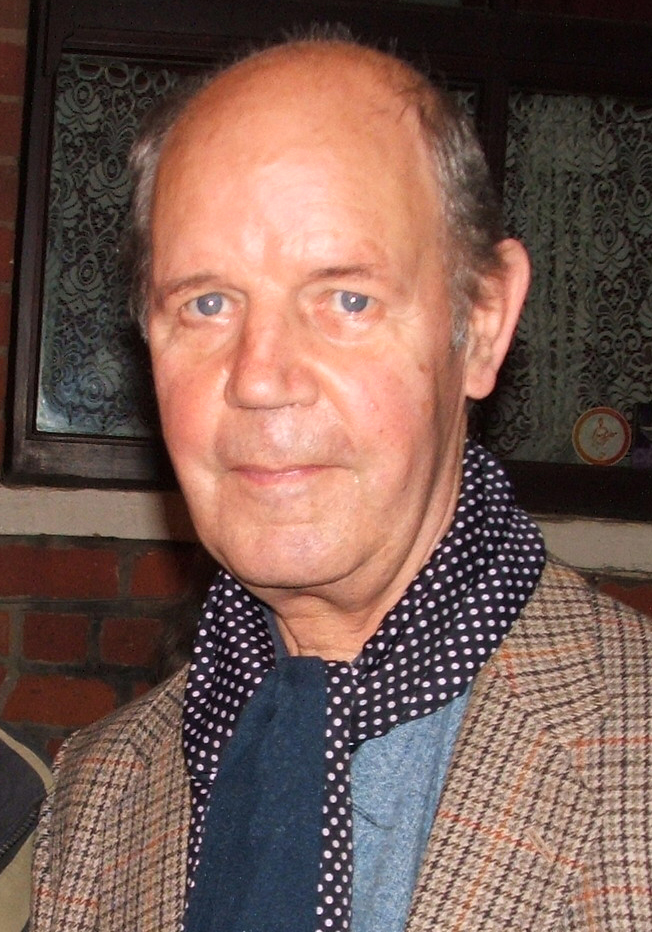
- Cant in 2007
- Born: 12 July 1933; Ipswich, Suffolk, England
- Died: 19 June 2017 (aged 83); Denville Hall, Northwood, England
- Occupations: Actor, television presenter, writer
- Years active: 1950s–2011
- Spouse(s): Sylvia Mary Gibson (m. 1959; div. 1984) Cherry Britton (m. 1984)
- Children: 5, including Richard Cant

Brian Cant (12 July 1933 – 19 June 2017) was an English actor, television presenter, and writer. He was known for his work in BBC television programmes for children from 1964 onward, most notably Play School, and in later years, Dappledown Farm.

== Early life and education ==
Cant was born on 12 July 1933 in Ipswich and educated at Northgate Grammar School for Boys, a state grammar school, since renamed Northgate High School. He trained with Ipswich Town F.C.'s youth team. He worked as a printer before starting to act in the late 1950s.

== Television and film ==
Cant was performing in BBC Schools drama television programmes about the Romans for the corporation when he heard that auditions were being held for a new pre-school children's programme which was to be shown on the new BBC 2 channel. This was Play School. At his audition he was asked by programme creator and the series' first producer Joy Whitby to get in a cardboard box and pretend to 'row out to sea'. Cant pretended to fish from his 'boat' and caught a Wellington boot full of custard. He was cast as a presenter and first appeared on the third week in May 1964; he stayed with the programme for 21 years of its 24-year run, becoming, according to Whitby, 'Mr Play School'. In an interview, Cant defended Play School and similar children's programmes as being designed to encourage children to try out the ideas presented.

His involvement in Play School directly led to his work on three linked Gordon Murray puppet series: Camberwick Green (1966), Trumpton (1967), and Chigley (1969). Later, Cant hosted or co-hosted the programmes Play Away (1971–84) and Bric-a-Brac (1980–82) for slightly older children. From 1990 to 1999, he starred as Brian the farmer in children's television puppet programme Dappledown Farm, as well as providing the voice for one of the characters, Harry the Heron. He was also the narrator of the UK versions of Jay Jay the Jet Plane and the popular Canadian children's show Bruno.

Cant also appeared in television series for adults. In the 1960s he appeared in two Doctor Who stories, in 1965 as Kert Gantry in The Daleks' Master Plan and in 1968 as Tensa in The Dominators. In 1979 he presented the BBC programme The Great Egg Race, and was one of the guest presenters of the 1982 series of the game show It's a Knockout after Eddie Waring retired. In 1998 Cant parodied his previous contributions as a narrator in 'The Organ Gang', a weekly segment in Lee and Herring's This Morning with Richard Not Judy, a BBC TV Sunday afternoon comedy show. He also made three appearances in the BBC1 daytime drama Doctors, each time as a different character, the last in 2011 as his final acting credit.

His film appearances were few, but included brief roles in The Pleasure Girls (1965), The Sandwich Man (1966), and A Feast at Midnight (1995), starring Christopher Lee.

In 2001, Cant appeared in a music video on Orbital's DVD The Altogether. The clip is similar to Play School, featuring Cant in his familiar presenter role. He read the second half of Ann Jungman's Vlad the Drac books for audiobook, replacing Anthony Daniels.

In April 2007, Cant was named as the best-loved voice from UK children's television, in a poll of over 1,200 people for Underground Ernie magazine. Cant came ahead of Bagpuss and Ivor the Engine narrator Oliver Postgate in second place, with David Jason (Danger Mouse) polling third. On 28 November 2010, he received the special award at the Children's BAFTAs for his work in children's television. During his acceptance speech he said, "When I was a child I spoke as a child, I understood as a child, I thought as a child. When I became a man I spoke as a child, I understood as a child, I thought as a child, and they paid me for it...!"

== Theatre ==
Cant's theatre credits include Still Playing Away, The Railway Children, An Ideal Husband, Habeas Corpus, Gaslight, Side by Side by Sondheim, The Canterbury Tales, Oh, Coward!, There's No Place Like a Home and many more, as well as pantomimes.

== Personal life ==
Cant lived in Chalfont St Giles, Buckinghamshire. He was married twice and had five children. He had two sons from his first marriage to Mary Gibson, including the actor Richard Cant. In 1984, he married writer and director Cherry Britton, daughter of Tony Britton and sister of TV presenter Fern Britton and actor Jasper Britton. They had three children.

== Death ==
Cant was diagnosed with Parkinson's disease in 1999, as he disclosed in an interview with BBC Breakfast which was shown on 24 November 2010. He died on 19 June 2017, at the age of 83, at Denville Hall, in Northwood, London, a retirement home for people who worked in the entertainment industry.
