= Roy Skelton =

English voice actor (1931–2011)

- Roy Skelton in Doctor Who: The Green Death
- Born: Roy William Skelton; 20 July 1931; Nottingham, England
- Died: 8 June 2011 (aged 79); Brighton, East Sussex, England
- Occupations: Actor, voice artist
- Years active: 1954–2011
- Spouse: Hilary Tooze (m. 1959)
- Children: 2

Roy William Skelton (20 July 1931 – 8 June 2011) was a British actor most noted for his voice work. He was best known for playing Zippy and George in Rainbow, and for voicing the Daleks and the Cybermen in Doctor Who.

== Life and career ==
Born in Nottingham to John H Skelton and Dorothy (née Bromley), Skelton trained at the Bristol Old Vic Theatre School and worked at Oxford for a year. Having performed voices, based on those from The Goon Show, while rehearsing for a Pinocchio TV serial he played Lampwick in, producer Gordon Murray cast him as part of the BBC Puppet Theatre. Skelton met Peter Hawkins during Toytown, who would become a close friend. In 1957, he met his future wife Hilary Tooze at a nightclub, marrying her two years later. They would go on to have two children, Eliza and Samantha.

In 1966, he began his long association with Doctor Who voicing the Monoids in The Ark, which Peter Hawkins recommended him for. In the 1966 story, The Tenth Planet, Skelton originated the voices of the original Cybermen, delivering an unsettling, sing-song voice constructed by placing the inflections of words on the wrong syllables. This confused many of the actors, who did not know when his lines finished.

In 1967, Skelton began voicing the Daleks with The Evil of the Daleks alongside Peter, who recommended him for this as well. He made a rule that although the Dalek voice could get higher when angry, it could never go down. He also voiced the Krotons in their sole 1968 appearance, giving them South African accents, and his first on-screen role was as Norton in Colony in Space (1971).

In 1973, he became the voice of both Zippy and George in Rainbow, continuing the roles for over 30 years and writing over 150 episodes. Some moments Skelton most fondly-remembered included meeting Elizabeth II and Ernie Wise, and with his singing experience he played Father Christmas in one episode, although the producers at Thames Television did not believe he did the singing. He considered Rainbow to be his best work, and particularly enjoyed being able to quickly switch between Zippy and George. Contrary to popular belief, he did not base Zippy's voice on the Daleks, but when asked where he got it, he jokingly claimed that it was a cross between Margaret Thatcher and Ian Paisley. Roy had intentions to write for other programmes, including Take a Chance, but never received any further contracts requiring him to do so.

Also in 1973, he played the on-screen role of James in the Doctor Who story The Green Death standing in for Tony Adams. Skelton was asked to play Davros in Genesis of the Daleks, but due to filming Rainbow had to be replaced by Michael Wisher, a good friend. He, Michael and another Dalek voice, Brian Miller, who he befriended alongside his wife Elisabeth Sladen, would appear together in Barry Letts's 1986 production of Alice in Wonderland.

When Nicholas Briggs became the voice of the Daleks in its 2005 revival, Skelton praised his performance for being able to put emotion into it, even though he wished he had been doing it. He died at his home in Brighton, East Sussex, on 8 June 2011, after suffering a stroke at age 79.

== Filmography ==
Year	Title	Role	Notes	Ref.
1954	Sunday Night Theatre	Angelo's assistant	Episode “The Comedy of Errors”	
1956-1958	Toytown	Mr. Growser; Dennis the Dachshund; Inventor	16 episodes	
1957	Beauty and the Beast	Voices	TV movie	
1958	The Emperor’s New Clothes	Voices	TV movie	
1958	The Winkleburg Armourer	Voices	TV movie	
1958-1964	A Rubovian Legend	Lord Chamberlain; King Boris of Borsovia	25 episodes	
1959	The Petrified Princess	Voices	TV movie	
1959	The King of the Golden River	Voices	TV movie	
1960	The Crumpot Candles	Voices	TV movie	
1960	The Magic Tree	Voices	TV movie	
1961-1962	Chippy	Voices	39 episodes	
1962	The Dancing Princess	Voices	TV movie	
1962	Small Time	Voices	10 episodes of The Sillie Billies	
1962	Play It Cool	Mechanic #1	Film, uncredited	
1963	Picture Book	Sossidge the Dog	26 episodes	
1964	Detective	Porter	Episode “The Case of Oscar Brodski”	
1965	Give the Dog a Bone	Mr. Mouse	Film	
1966–1988	Doctor Who	Monoid voices Cyberman voices Dalek voices Britannicus Base Computer; Kroton voices Norton; Wester; James; Marshal Chedaki; King Rokon; K9 (uncredited - Destiny of the Daleks only)	50 episodes	
1966	Quick Before They Catch Us	Danny	5 episodes	
1967	Out of the Unknown	Robot	Episode “The Prophet”	
1968	Z-Cars	Tommy Wyatt	2 episodes	
1968	Softly, Softly	Fred Thomas	Episode “Five Pair O Hands”	
1969	Fraud Squad	Eddie Bone	Episode 6 “Over a Barrel”	
1969	Night After Night After Night	Counsel	Film	
1970	Ivanhoe	Higg	Episode “Time of Trial”	
1970	Sentimental Education	Auctioneer	Episode 4 “Last Love”	
1970	There's a Girl in My Soup	Reporter	Film, uncredited	
1971	The Last of the Mohicans	Private Jones	2 episodes	
1972	Frenzy	Detective	Film, uncredited	
1973–1992	Rainbow	Zippy and George	993 episodes	
1980–1981	Take a Chance	Various	13 episodes	
1986	Alice in Wonderland	Mock Turtle	Episode 4	
1989–1998	The Bill	Various	4 episodes	
1996-1997	Mole in the Hole	Freddie and Fifi	25 episodes	
2003	Ghost of Albion: Legacy	Henry Swift; Balturm; Balberith	Webseries, 4 episodes	
2004	Ghost of Albion: Embers	Henry Swift; Farris	Webseries, 5 episodes	
2008	Ashes to Ashes	Zippy and George	Episode 1	
