= The Awful Spook =

- Directed by: Vernon Stallings
- Produced by: John Randolph Bray
- Animation by: Leon Searl
- Color process: Black and white
- Production company: Bray Studios
- Distributed by: Goldwyn Pictures
- Release date: January 21, 1921
- Running time: 2:21
- Language: English

The Awful Spook is a silent short animated film created by Bray Studios, featuring Krazy Kat.

== Plot ==
The short film

Krazy is sitting on the slope of a hill until he is approached and greeted by a husky carrying a bowling ball. The husky asks Krazy to deliver the bowling ball to a terrier who is the husky's friend. The husky also tells Krazy that the terrier will pay him five cents for the delivery. Krazy accepts the request, and takes the ball.

On his journey to delivering to the terrier, Krazy carries the bowling ball on his head. While still on the slope, Krazy walks by a tree with a spider web on the branch. When the spider lowers right in front of his face, Krazy is startled and drops the ball which begins rolling away. The bowling ball rolls toward a pond where it breaks down a vertical log where Igntaz Mouse is sitting on. Both Ignatz and the ball drop into the pond as a result. When the bowling ball and Ignatz surface from the water, Ignatz mistakes the ball for a monster, and frantically runs away. Momentarily, Krazy arrives at the pond to retrieve the bowling ball.

The scene shifts to Ignatz who is in another place outdoors, standing in front of a picket fence. Just then, Krazy, with the bowling ball on top, comes by the other side of the fence. Because the fence is as tall as the cat, and the bowling ball is sticking above, Ignatz notices this and thought what he thinks is a monster is after him. Once more Ignatz resumes running.

Ignatz Mouse comes to the terrier's home to tell the resident about something scary going on, but the terrier calmly tells him that there is no such thing around. Moments later, Krazy also arrives. Krazy finally hands the bowling ball to the terrier who in turn pays the cat as promised. Ultimately realizing that his monster is merely the ball, Ignatz is annoyed and heads to the back of the terrier's brick yard to plot something devious. Ignatz finds a brick, and aims to throw it at Krazy, but before he could do so, an Officer Bull Pupp confronts and asks him if he intends to do anything malicious with the block. Although Ignatz denies the suspicion, Officer Pupp confiscates the brick, and tosses it upwards, but the airborne brick still finds its way onto Krazy's head, knocking the cat off balance. Krazy even hallucinates, seeing a mouse with wings.

== Reception ==
Some scholars consider the Bray Krazy short films, such as this one, as the most faithful to the character.

== Home media ==
In the 1970s, the short film was released in home film reels under the erroneous series name Kitty Kat.

The short film was also released in 2004 in a DVD video compilation called George Herriman's Kinomatic Krazy Kat Kartoon Klassics.
