= Camberwick Green =

British stop-motion animated TV series (1966)

- Title card
- Genre: Stop motion animation
- Written by: Gordon Murray
- Narrated by: Brian Cant
- Theme music composer: Freddie Phillips
- Country of origin: United Kingdom
- Original language: English
- No. of series: 1
- No. of episodes: 13

Production
- Producer: Gordon Murray
- Animators: Bob Bura; John Hardwick
- Running time: 15 mins
- Production company: Gordon Murray Productions

Original release
- Network: BBC1
- Release: 3 January – 28 March 1966

Related
- Trumpton Chigley

Camberwick Green is a British children's television series that ran from January to March 1966 on BBC1, featuring stop motion puppets. Camberwick Green is the first in the Trumptonshire trilogy, which also includes Trumpton and Chigley.

== Background ==
The series was written and produced by Gordon Murray and animated by Bob Bura and John Hardwick. Music was by Freddie Phillips while narration and song vocals were provided by Brian Cant. There are thirteen fifteen-minute colour episodes produced by Gordon Murray Pictures. The inspiration for the name is believed to have stemmed from the East Sussex village of Wivelsfield Green, supported by the nearby villages of Plumpton (Trumpton) and Chailey (Chigley).

== Story structure ==
Each episode begins with a shot of a musical box which rotates while playing a tune. It is accompanied by the following narration:

Here is a box, a musical box, wound up and ready to play. But this box can hide a secret inside! Can you guess what is in it today?

Then the lid, a hexagon constructed of six triangles in alternating colours, slowly opens up like an iris, or in the manner of a camera shutter, while the box smoothly revolves to the accompaniment of an exquisite Baroque minuet. A hexagonal platform bearing the motionless figure of the puppet character which will play a central role in today's episode, slowly rises into position: the platform flush with the shifted triangular cover-tiles, which are now splayed open like the stiff petals of a flower; as the music-box comes to a halt with an audible click. After a brief introduction, the background appears and the story begins.

The series is set in the small, picturesque (and fictitious) village of Camberwick Green, Trumptonshire, which is inhabited by such characters as Police Constable McGarry (Number 452), and Windy Miller, owner of a clanking old – but nevertheless efficiently functional – windmill and a firm believer in old-fashioned farming methods.

The series mixes contemporary technology with Edwardian costume and social attitudes. Almost all the characters have their own theme songs and travelling songs. There are other characters who never appear in the stories, including Mr Honeyman who (according to Peter Hazell's song) "keeps the chemist shop", and an unnamed clown or pierrot, who turns a roller caption to display the show's opening and closing credits.

Each week the villagers undergo such domestic crises as a shortage of flour, a swarm of bees, a water shortage and rumours of an unwanted electrical substation being built in the village, but all problems are happily resolved by the end of each episode. The episodes then conclude with the narrator bidding farewell to the puppet character who was seen at the beginning and is shown going back into the musical box.

Camberwick Green has no overt fantasy content apart from the musical box. It is simply about ordinary people doing everyday things, and perhaps for that reason it remains popular. Along with its two successors, the series was repeated many times on the BBC until 1985 and then on Channel 4 from 1994 to 2000.

== Episodes ==
Episode titles were given in Radio Times but were not shown on screen.

No.	Title	Original release date
1	"Peter Hazell the Postman"	3 January 1966
2	"Windy Miller"	10 January 1966
3	"Mr Crockett the Garage Man"	17 January 1966
4	"Dr Mopp"	24 January 1966
5	"Farmer Jonathan Bell"	31 January 1966
6	"Captain Snort"	7 February 1966
7	"Paddy Murphy"	14 February 1966
8	"Roger Varley the Sweep"	21 February 1966
9	"PC McGarry"	28 February 1966
10	"Mr Dagenham the Salesman"	7 March 1966
11	"Mr Carraway the Fishmonger"	14 March 1966
12	"Mickey Murphy the Baker"	21 March 1966
13	"Mrs Honeyman and Her Baby"	28 March 1966

== Characters ==
=== Pippin Fort ===
The staff and soldier boys of Pippin Fort are a regular feature of Camberwick Green, demonstrating their foot drill, working in the community, responding to emergencies, and (at a stage before Trumpton in the time-line) providing the local fire-fighting capability with their bright red mobile fire pump.

- Captain Snort - the tough but fair commanding officer; appears in every episode except for episode 7.
- Sergeant Major Grout - the second-in-command at the fort; appears in 12 out of 13 episodes.
- Private Armitage - the strongest swimmer, later revealed (in Chigley) to be a frogman; appears in 12 out of 13 episodes.
- Private Featherby - appears in 12 out of 13 episodes.
- Private Higgins - the smartest soldier boy, who has a military career ahead; appears in 12 out of 13 episodes.
- Private Hopwood - appears in 12 out of 13 episodes.
- Private Lumley - has poor drill and can't tell his left from his right; not a natural soldier, he discovers an aptitude for baking, and is apprenticed to Mickey Murphy; appears in 12 out of 13 episodes.
- Private Meek - sometimes in trouble for daydreaming, he proves adept at babysitting Baby Honeyman - appears in 12 out of 13 episodes.
- The Sentry - a regular character, also the fort's Bugler, who has dialogue and plotlines, but is never named; appears in 11 out of 13 episodes.

=== The villagers ===
- Mr 'Windy' Miller - an iconic character, who keeps Colley's Mill, rides a tricycle, and values tradition; he appears in every episode.
- Dr Mopp - the village doctor, who wears a top hat and drives a vintage motor car; he appears in 12 episodes.
- Mr Carraway - the fishmonger; he appears in 12 episodes, and also makes a guest appearance in Chigley.
- Mrs Dingle - the postmistress, invariably accompanied by her puppy dog 'Packet'; she appears in every episode.
- Mr Mickey Murphy - the village baker; he appears in every episode, and also makes a guest appearance in Chigley.
- Mrs Murphy - the baker's wife; she appears in 8 episodes.
- Paddy Murphy - the baker's son; he appears in 9 episodes.
- Mary Murphy - the baker's daughter; she appears in 9 episodes.
- Police Constable McGarry - Camberwick Green's policeman, known as "PC McGarry, number 452" from his theme song; he appears in 6 episodes, and also makes a guest appearance in Chigley.
- Farmer Jonathan Bell - operator of a "modern mechanical farm", and a promoter of technology; he appears in 11 episodes; also makes guest appearances in Trumpton and Chigley.
- Mr Peter Hazel - the village postman; he appears in 10 episodes.
- Mrs Honeyman - a housewife who is the main vehicle of village gossip; she appears in every episode; also makes minor background appearances in Trumpton.
- Baby Honeyman - Mrs Honeyman's baby boy; he appears in every episode.
- Mr Thomas Tripp - the milkman and proprietor of Tripp's Dairy; he appears in 5 episodes; also appears in Trumpton and in Chigley.
- Mr Roger Varley - the chimney sweep; he appears in 9 episodes; also makes guest appearances in Trumpton and appears in 1 episode of Chigley, in which he services the Winkstead Hall boiler, known as 'Binnie'.
- Mr Crockett - the proprietor of Crockett's Garage; he appears in 5 episodes, and is mentioned in 2 others; also makes guest appearances in Trumpton and Chigley.
- Mr Dagenham - the salesman who drives a flash red sports car, and is said to be able to sell anything; he appears in only 1 episode (but is the star of that episode), and is mentioned in 1 other. He also appears in 2 episodes of Chigley.
- Water Board Foreman - he is not named, and appears only in the final episode, supervising the engineers.
- Water Board Engineer - although never named, he has a key role in episodes 8 and 13, and appears in 4 episodes in total.
- Water Board Assistant Engineer - the unnamed Water Board Engineer has a similarly unnamed assistant in episodes 8 and 13; he appears only in those 2 episodes.

=== Unseen characters ===
- Mr Honeyman - the village chemist, referenced particularly in episodes 1 and 6
- Mrs Bell - the farmer's wife
- The Farmhands - references are made to the farmhands on Farmer Bell's farm
- Mrs Mopp - the doctor's wife
- Mrs Varley - the sweep's wife, referred to in several of Mrs Honeyman's stories
- Mrs Varley's mother - the sweep's mother-in-law is also said to be local
- Mrs McGarry - the policeman's wife
- Dr Mopp's nephews
- Tom Ranger - a boy from the village, who suffered a minor accident
- Mr Crockett's son
- Mrs Honeyman's nephew is mentioned to Mr Carraway

=== Other characters ===
- Clown or Pierrot - the classic Commedia dell'arte character appears in the opening and closing credits of every episode. In contrast to the music box, his theme is a light piece (such as a saltarello) played on Spanish guitar.

== Modern use ==
The 1970s pop band Candlewick Green shares its name with the originally planned title of the series. (Murray had planned to name the show "Candlewick Green" but found that the person writing his contract had misheard and mangled the name; as he did not object to the new name, Murray went forth with the show under the mangled title.)

In 1987 the indie group Pop Will Eat Itself sampled Brian Cant's "Here is a box..." introduction for the start of their song Razorblade Kisses. The song itself is an instrumental reprise of their song Evelyn, but played in a musical box style to make it sound similar to the Camberwick Green tune.

In 1987, Windy Miller was the face of Windmill Bakery's wholemeal bread. Ceramic pots depicting Windy hugging a beehive and barrels of marmalade and jam were made to tie in with the promotion.

Camberwick Green was spoofed for a 1988 edition of Spitting Image, as "Gamberwick Greenbelt". The 90-second sketch depicted a puppet Nicholas Ridley, described as "Old Nicky Ridley, the village idiot", using a front loader to demolish the whole village for redevelopment. In 2015, Private Eye resurrected the spoof as the "Camberwick Greenbelt" strip cartoon, offering satirical comment on social and political impacts on the British countryside. VIZ magazine produced two rather bleak spoof versions named Camberwick Greggs and Trumpton. In the former the baker is driven out of business by the opening of a branch of Greggs nearby, and the latter revolves around a caricature of Donald Trump, building a wall between Trumpton and Chigley.

The character Windy Miller and his famous windmill appeared in September 2005 along with some other Camberwick Green characters in commercials for Quaker Oats on television in the United Kingdom. The puppets and setting are all re creations, because Murray destroyed the originals in the 1970s. The original narrator, Brian Cant, auditioned to do the voice over for the commercials, before the job was instead given to Charlie Higson.

Episode 5 of the second series of the BBC's Life on Mars features a recreation of the opening of Camberwick Green, with a puppet of the show's main character, Sam Tyler (John Simm), emerging from the musical box and despairing over his colleague, Gene Hunt (Philip Glenister), who can be seen in puppet form "kicking in a nonce" at the end. This later leads to Sam to threaten Hunt, telling him to "Stay out of Camberwick Green!" (a cross-reference to the popular and long-running police TV series Dixon of Dock Green). It emerges that Sam is tripping after being accidentally overdosed in his hospital bed.

Again, the voice over was not supplied by Brian Cant, but is delivered in a similar style. It differs from the original by saying: "This is a box, a magical box, playing a magical tune. But inside this box there lies a surprise. Do you know who's in it today?"

The narration was provided by Brian Little, the co-founder of Hot Animation, the company that created the sequence. His recording was supposed to be a temporary guide track to help the animators time the shots, but the producers of Life on Mars were content to retain it for the final version. The one-minute sequence was designed and animated by Paul Couvela, the supervising animator of Bob the Builder.

Windy Miller cameos in the closing sequence of the video for the 2009 BBC Children in Need charity single "The Official BBC Children in Need Medley".

The music video to Radiohead's "Burn the Witch" pays homage to both Camberwick Green and The Wicker Man.

Caterham Cars released a limited-edition model of their Seven range called the Sprint with one of the colour options as Camberwick Green "Caterham Seven Sprint Review". TopGear. 9 November 2016.

== Restoration and commercial releases ==
The original masters of Camberwick Green – along with those of its sequels Trumpton and Chigley – were believed to have been lost, with most surviving copies tending to suffer from scratched, wobbly or grainy picture quality and a muffled soundtrack. When boxes of some original film were discovered in Gordon Murray's attic – with more footage then discovered by the BBC – the trilogy was restored and remastered for a Blu-ray release in 2011.

=== VHS and DVD Releases ===
In 1984, eighteen years after the broadcasts on BBC in 1966, Longman Video released the first four episodes on video, as part of its Children's Treasury Collection.

VHS video title	Year of release	Episodes
Camberwick Green (SLL 5024)	1984	"Peter Hazell The Postman"; "Windy Miller"; "Mr Crockett the Garage Man"; "Dr. Mopp"

Later, in 1989, the BBC released a video with the last three episodes (including E12 Mickey Murphy the Baker as the first episode, E11 Mr Carraway as the second episode and E13 Mrs Honeyman and her Baby as the last episode).

VHS video title	Year of release	Episodes
Camberwick Green 1: Mickey Murphy the Baker (BBCV 4231)	10 April 1989	Mickey Murphy the Baker; "Mr Carraway the Fishmonger"; "Mrs Honeyman and her Baby"

Then, in 1996–1997 Telstar Video Entertainment, as part of its Star Kids range released three videos.

VHS video title	Year of release	Episodes
A Busy Day in Camberwick Green (TVE 3011)	19 August 1996	"Peter Hazel the Postman"; "Windy Miller"; "Mr Crockett the Garage Man"; "Dr. Mopp"
It's Fun to Work in Camberwick Green (TVE 3018)	17 March 1997	"Mickey Murphy the Baker"; "Mrs Honeyman and her Baby"; "PC McGarry"; "Mr Carraway the Fishmonger"
Meet Your Friends in Camberwick Green (TVE 3022)	11 August 1997	"Farmer Jonathan Bell"; "Paddy Murphy"; "Captain Snort"; "Roger Varley the Sweep"

In 2001, Telstar Video Entertainment Ltd released a single DVD with 12 episodes of the series on it.

DVD title	Year of release	Episodes
Stories from Camberwick Green (TDVD9025)	2001	"Peter Hazel the Postman"; "Windy Miller"; "Mr Crockett the Garage Man"; "Dr. Mopp"; "Mickey Murphy the Baker"; "Mrs Honeyman and her Baby"; "PC McGarry"; "Mr Carraway the Fishmonger"; "Farmer Jonathan Bell"; "Paddy Murphy"; "Captain Snort"; "Roger Varley the Sweep"

In 2006, Entertainment Rights released a single DVD with all 13 episodes of the series on it.

DVD title	Year of release	Episodes
Camberwick Green - The Complete Collection - All 13 Episodes (8242034-11)	8 May 2006	"Peter Hazel the Postman"; "Windy Miller"; "Mr Crockett the Garage Man"; "Dr. Mopp"; "Jonathan Bell the Farmer"; "Captain Snort"; "Paddy Murphy"; "Roger Varley the Sweep"; "PC McGarry"; "Mr Dagenham the Salesman"; "Mr Carraway the Fishmonger"; "Mickey Murphy the Baker"; "Mrs Honeyman and her Baby"

=== DVD and Blu ray ===
The digitally remastered Camberwick Green was released in December 2011 in one multi pack, comprising a Blu-ray disc and a DVD.

== Credits ==
- Music: Freddie Phillips
- Narrator: Brian Cant
- Sets: Margaret Brownfoot and Andrew Brownfoot
- Animation: Bob Bura & John Hardwick
- Puppets: Gordon Murray
- Produced by Gordon Murray Puppets Ltd 1966.
