= Trumptonshire =

Fictional county of the United Kingdom

Trumptonshire is a fictional English county created by Gordon Murray. It is the setting for the Trumptonshire Trilogy, a British series of stop-motion children's television programmes comprising Camberwick Green (1966), Trumpton (1967), and Chigley (1969).

Trumptonshire is populated by characters portrayed by 8-inch (20 cm) tall stop-motion puppets. Trumpton is a market town with an impressive town hall and clock tower and concluded by the fire brigade band concert; Camberwick Green and Chigley are two nearby villages with one of them (Camberwick Green) featuring a musical box introducing and concluding the character and the other (Chigley) featuring a narrowboat, a crane, a beam engine a steam train and a factory whistle concluded by the Dutch organ.

== Trumptonshire communities ==
From the dialogue of Camberwick Green it is discovered that Wellchester is the main city of Trumptonshire county. In the Chigley episode "The Balloon Flight", viewers are given sweeping aerial views across the Trumptonshire countryside and skyline; from this it is seen that Trumptonshire possesses a large medieval castle, although it is never named in the programmes.

Murray is not known to have provided any definitive map of Trumptonshire. The only map regularly seen in the programmes is located in the control room of Trumpton fire station, and analysis has suggested that it actually depicts the area around Florence in Italy. Nonetheless, the following Trumptonshire settlements are identified in the storylines of the programmes.

- Camberwick Common, bordering Camberwick Green, is not visited in the programmes, but is referenced as a usual place of training for the Pippin Fort soldier boys. There are clay pits nearby.
- Camberwick Green is a quiet village community with a Post Office and several village shops, as was still common in late 1960s England. The wider parish includes outlying properties such as Colley's Mill, Bell's Farm, Crockett's Garage, Tripp's Dairy, and Pippin Fort. The village is central to the first Trumptonshire series, and is featured or referenced in all three series.
- Chigley is another quiet village community, but with a less defined village centre. It is located a short distance from Camberwick Green. It features some heavy industry, including Cresswell's Chigley Biscuit factory, and Treddle's Wharf, as well as cottage industry, represented by the Chigley Pottery. A canal between Trumpton and Chigley (named as the Trumpton Canal), a lock named Camberwick Lock and a river (unnamed in the programmes) run through the village. It is central to the third and final Trumptonshire series.
- Oakridge is a village near Trumpton. The cottages of Mrs Cobbit and of Dora & Chippy Minton are revealed to be located on the road from Trumpton to Oakridge.
- Trimbridge is the next village after Chigley along the river; the river bridge at Trimbridge is the first crossing point of the river after Chigley bridge; there is a direct road from Chigley to Trimbridge, running alongside the river.
- Trumpton is the local market town, with a local corporation and mayor, and numbers of infrastructure features for the wider region, most famously the Fire Brigade with Trumpton Fire Station. There are various shops, and a large public park, and many streets of terraced housing. Some residents (such as the Mintons) are depicted as living in cottages on the outer edge of the town. It has (amongst other facilities) a hospital, swimming pool (mentioned or referenced in Camberwick Green episode 12), public library, waterworks, and gasworks. It is central to the second Trumptonshire series.
- Wellchester is the county's large town or city community, some distance from Trumpton via Trumpton Fire Station, and with large department stores. The character Mrs Honeyman ventures to Wellchester (in Camberwick Green episode 6) having heard that one of the department stores has a sale on hats.
- Winkstead Hall estate is the home of Lord Belborough and his domestic staff, located on the edge of Chigley. It is depicted in every Chigley episode.
- Wintlebury is another Trumptonshire town. The programmes were made in an era in which many British communities were adjusting to life without local railway services, following the Beeching cuts. The only rail service depicted in the series is Lord Belborough's heritage railway, but the nearest mainline railway station is said to be in Wintlebury, from which there are direct trains to London. Driving directions quoted in the series reveal that Wintlebury is reached from Chigley by driving through Trumpton.

== Actual locations ==
The true locations on which the fictional communities were based remain uncertain. According to Murray, the three title communities are however based on real locations one and a half miles (2.4 km) from each other at the corners of an equilateral triangle. A 2016 article in the Daily Express speculated that the real-life locations could be Wivelsfield Green (Camberwick Green), Plumpton (Trumpton), and Chailey (Chigley), which are neighbouring communities in a roughly triangular configuration in Lewes District, East Sussex.

== VHS ==
Between 1996 and 1997, Telstar Video Entertainment, as part of its 'Star Kids' range released seven volumes of the Trumptonshire trilogy on video with four episodes on each of them.

VHS video title	Year of release	Episodes
Camberwick Green - Vol 1 - A Busy Day in Camberwick Green (TVE 3011)	19 August 1996	"Peter Hazell The Postman"; "Windy Miller"; "Mr Crockett the Garage Man"; "Dr. Mopp"
Camberwick Green - Vol 2 - A Trip to Trumpton (TVE 3012)	19 August 1996	"Nick Fisher the Billposter"; "Miss Lovelace and the Mayor's Hat"; "Mrs Cobbit and the Ice Cream Man"; "Miss Lovelace and the Statue"
Camberwick Green - Vol 3 - Let's Visit Chigley (TVE 3014)	7 October 1996	"Bessie to the Rescue"; "Lord Belborough's Secret"; "The Balloon"; "The Fountain"
Camberwick Green - Vol 4 - It's Fun to Work in Camberwick Green (TVE 3018)	17 March 1997	"Mickey Murphy the Baker"; "Mrs Honeyman and her Baby"; "PC McGarry"; "Mr Carraway the Fishmonger"
Camberwick Green - Vol 5 - Tales from Trumpton Town (TVE 3020)	14 April 1997	"The Mayor's Birthday"; "Mr Platt and the Painter"; "The Rag and Bone Man"; "Telephones"
Camberwick Green - Vol 6 - A Ride to Chigley (TVE 3021)	12 May 1997	"Trouble with the Crane"; "A Present for Lord Belborough"; "Apples Galore"; "The Broken Bridge"
Camberwick Green - Vol 7 - Meet Your Friends in Camberwick Green (TVE 3022)	11 August 1997	"Farmer Jonathan Bell"; "Paddy Murphy"; "Captain Snort"; "Roger Varley the Sweep"

== DVD ==
Between 2001 and 2002, Telstar Video Entertainment had released three single DVDs of the whole Trumptonshire trilogy, and one 3 DVD Set with the Complete Collection of almost the same three discs in the set. The 2001 versions of the standalone DVD releases show just a fraction of the episodes (Camberwick Green has twelve episodes, Trumpton eight episodes and Chigley also eight episodes) whereas the three-disc box set (and all subsequent reprints of the 2001 standalone sets) contain all thirteen episodes from the entire trilogy.

DVD disc title	Episodes
Stories from Camberwick Green (TDVD9025)	"Peter Hazell the Postman"; "Windy Miller"; "Mr Crockett the Garage Man"; "Dr Mopp"; "Mickey Murphy the Baker"; "Mrs Honeyman and her Baby"; "PC McGarry"; "Mr Carraway the Fishmonger"; "Farmer Jonathan Bell"; "Paddy Murphy"; "Captain Snort"; "Roger Varley the Sweep"
Stories from Trumpton (TDVD9026)	"Nick Fisher the Bill Poster"; "Miss Lovelace and the Mayor's Hat"; "Mrs Cobbit and the Icecream Man"; "Miss Lovelace and the Statue"; "The Mayor's Birthday"; "Telephones"; "The Rag and Bone Man"; "Mr Platt and the Painter"
Stories from Chigley (TDVD9027)	"Bessie to the Rescue"; "Lord Belborough's Secret"; "The Balloon"; "The Fountain"; "Trouble with the Crane"; "Clay for Mr Farthing"; "A Present for Lord Belborough"; "Apples Galore"; "Willie Munn"; "The Broken Bridge"
Camberwick Green / Trumpton / Chigley - The Complete Collection (TDVD9033)	DISC 1 - Camberwick Green: "Peter Hazell the Postman"; "Windy Miller"; "Mr Crockett the Garage Man"; "Dr Mopp"; "Mickey Murphy the Baker"; "Mrs Honeyman and her Baby"; "PC McGarry"; "Mr Carraway the Fishmonger"; "Farmer Jonathan Bell"; "Paddy Murphy"; "Captain Snort"; "Roger Varley the Sweep"; "Mr Dagenham the Salesman"
Camberwick Green / Trumpton / Chigley - The Complete Collection (TDVD9033)	DISC 2 - Trumpton: "Nick Fisher the Bill Poster"; "Miss Lovelace and the Mayor's Hat"; "Mrs Cobbit and the Icecream Man"; "Miss Lovelace and the Statue"; "The Mayor's Birthday"; "Telephones"; "The Rag and Bone Man"; "Mr Platt and the Painter"; "The Window Cleaner"; "Cuthbert's Morning Off"; "The Plumber"; "Pigeons"; "The Greenhouse"
Camberwick Green / Trumpton / Chigley - The Complete Collection (TDVD9033)	DISC 3 - Chigley: "Bessie to the Rescue"; "Lord Belborough's Secret"; "The Balloon"; "The Fountain"; "The Garden Wall"; "Binnie and Bessie"; "Lord Belborough's Lucky Day"; "Trouble with the Crane"; "Clay for Mr Farthing"; "A Present for Lord Belborough"; "Apples Galore"; "Willie Munn"; "The Broken Bridge"

On 2006, Entertainment Rights released a complete DVD boxset with three separate discs of the Trumptonshire trilogy in one whole box set with 13 episodes on each disc.

DVD disc title	Year of release	Episodes
Trumptonshire - The Complete Collection - All 39 Episodes (8244201–11)	25 September 2006	"Peter Hazell the Postman"; "Windy Miller"; "Mr Crockett the Garage Man"; "Dr Mopp"; "Mickey Murphy the Baker"; "Mrs Honeyman and her Baby"; "PC McGarry"; "Mr Carraway the Fishmonger"; "Farmer Jonathan Bell"; "Paddy Murphy"; "Captain Snort"; "Roger Varley the Sweep"; "Mr Dagenham the Salesman"; "Nick Fisher the Bill Poster"; "Miss Lovelace and the Mayor's Hat"; "Mrs Cobbit and the Icecream Man"; "Miss Lovelace and the Statue"; "The Mayor's Birthday"; "Telephones"; "The Rag and Bone Man"; "Mr Platt and the Painter"; "The Window Cleaner"; "Cuthbert's Morning Off"; "The Plumber"; "Pigeons"; "The Greenhouse"; "Bessie to the Rescue"; "Lord Belborough's Secret"; "The Balloon"; "The Fountain"; "The Garden Wall"; "Binnie and Bessie"; "Lord Belborough's Lucky Day"; "Trouble with the Crane"; "Clay for Mr Farthing"; "A Present for Lord Belborough"; "Apples Galore"; "Willie Munn"; "The Broken Bridge"

BBC Studios and Post Production's Digital Media Services team remastered all 39 episodes of the Trumptonshire Trilogy in 2011 for release on DVD and Blu-Ray, cleaning, scanning and digitally restoring the film footage frame by frame. Originally, only Camberwick Green was released on a Blu-Ray/DVD double play set in 2011, using these new restored masters of the episodes, but eventually in 2023 Fabulous Films released a box set featuring the restored masters from 2011 and all the bonus features from the Entertainment Rights sets. The three sets included in the box set can also be bought individually.

== References in other media ==
Trumptonshire was used as a hypothetical constituency by the BBC Radio 4 programme More or Less to explain how polling and voting could play out during the 2015 UK general election.

In 2016, the satirical magazine Private Eye published several comic strips named Trumpton, parodying the Donald Trump 2016 presidential campaign. The music video for the 2016 Radiohead single "Burn the Witch" was inspired by the Trumptonshire Trilogy. According to Murray's son in law, Murray's family was not asked permission to use the style and saw it as a "tarnishing of the brand".
