= Trumpton =

British stop-motion animated TV series (1967)

- Title card
- Genre: Stop-motion animation
- Created by: Gordon Murray
- Written by: Alison Prince
- Narrated by: Brian Cant
- Theme music composer: Freddie Phillips
- Country of origin: United Kingdom
- Original language: English
- No. of seasons: 1
- No. of episodes: 13

Production
- Producer: Gordon Murray
- Animators: Bob Bura; John Hardwick
- Running time: 15 mins
- Production company: Gordon Murray Productions

Original release
- Network: BBC1
- Release: 3 January – 28 March 1967

Related
- Camberwick Green; Chigley

Trumpton is a British stop-motion children's television series from the producers of Camberwick Green. First shown on the BBC from January to March 1967, it was the second series in the Trumptonshire trilogy, which comprised Camberwick Green, Trumpton and Chigley. Like the other two series, Trumpton continued to be repeated well into the 1980s as a part of the BBC's children's schedules.

Trumpton was narrated by Brian Cant, and animation was by Bob Bura, John Hardwick and Pasquale Ferrari. Scripts were by Alison Prince; all other production details were identical to Camberwick Green.

== Background, overview, story and structure ==
The action takes place in the fictional English town of Trumpton, a short distance from the equally fictional village of Camberwick Green, the focus of the first series in the Trumptonshire Trilogy. Each episode begins with a shot of Trumpton Town Hall clock:

"Here is the clock. The Trumpton clock. Telling the time... steadily, sensibly; never too quickly, never too slowly... Telling the time for Trumpton!"

The townsfolk then appear going about their daily business: examples include the unnamed Mayor, Mr Troop the town clerk, Chippy Minton the carpenter and his apprentice son Nibs, Mrs Cobbit the florist, Miss Lovelace the milliner and her trio of Pekingese dogs (Mitzi, Daphne and Lulu), Mr Clamp the greengrocer, Mr Munnings the printer, and Mr Platt the clockmaker.

Although most of the characters and settings are new, the style of the programme follows the pattern established by Camberwick Green (from which a few characters make an appearance in Trumpton also), in which domestic problems are cheerfully resolved by the end of the show, leaving the last minute or so for the fire brigade to become the town band and play the episode out.

The fire brigade is perhaps Trumpton's most-recognised feature. Captain Flack's roll-call was recited in all but one episode:

"Pugh! Pugh! Barney McGrew! Cuthbert! Dibble! Grubb!"

Puppeteer Gordon Murray explained that "Pugh and Pugh are twins you must understand – not Hugh, Pugh". In the episode "Cuthbert's Morning Off", Cuthbert's name is omitted (due to his absence). They are continually being called out to attend some emergency or other (in many cases to resolve fairly trivial matters), but to Captain Flack's annoyance never an actual fire. The main reason for this was the difficulty of animating fire, water, and smoke, although a naked flame was successfully animated in episode 8, for the abortive lighting of a bonfire. Nonetheless, after "Right men, action stations!", the fire brigade often absent-mindedly deployed the fire hose and were quickly halted by Captain Flack ("No, no! Not the hose!").

Writer Gordon Murray said that the communities of the series are "representative of real locations which are one-and-a-half miles from each other in an equidistant triangle", but declined to name them for fear of the area being "inundated with tourists".

== Episodes ==
Episode titles were given in Radio Times but were not shown on screen.

No.	Title	Original release date
1	"Nick Fisher the Bill Poster"	3 January 1967
2	"Miss Lovelace and the Mayor's Hat"	10 January 1967
3	"Mrs Cobbit and the Ice Cream Man"	17 January 1967
4	"Miss Lovelace and the Statue"	24 January 1967
5	"Mr Platt and the Painter"	31 January 1967
6	"The Mayor's Birthday"	7 February 1967
7	"Telephone"	14 February 1967
8	"The Rag and Bone Man"	21 February 1967
9	"The Window Cleaner"	28 February 1967
10	"Cuthbert's Morning Off"	7 March 1967 (Note: In the episode "Cuthbert's Morning Off", Cuthbert is omitted from the roll call because he is on leave. A respectful gap is therefore left between the names Barney McGrew and Dibble. This is the only episode in which Barney McGrew acknowledges his name in the roll call. The events of the episode require the fire brigade to find Cuthbert for his aunt.)
11	"The Plumber"	14 March 1967
12	"Pigeons"	21 March 1967
13	"The Greenhouse"	28 March 1967

== Characters ==
=== The Fire Brigade ===
Unusually, Trumpton Fire Brigade has two theme songs. The first, commencing with the famous roll call of firemen's names, accompanies every turnout of the Brigade; the second, ending every episode, forms the habitual tune played by the Brigade at the Thursday band concerts. The Fire Brigade appears in every episode. Captain Flack always has a speaking part, as do Fireman Grubb in episode 1 and Fireman Cuthbert in episode 10. In episode 4 the Mayor states "I can't think what Trumpton would do without its Fire Brigade".

- Captain Flack – the Fire Brigade's commander.
- Fireman Pugh – one half of the Pugh twins.
- Fireman Pugh – other half of the Pugh twins.
- Fireman Barney McGrew – the elderly driver of the fire engine, whose eyes are always closed.
- Fireman Cuthbert – the AWP operator; his theme song is 'I like the robin's merry song'.
- Fireman Dibble
- Fireman Grubb

=== The Corporation ===
- The Mayor – unlike the other characters, his name is never revealed; he appears in the opening titles, and in every episode except number 1.
- Mr Troop – the Town Clerk; he and the Mayor share the theme song 'Fire Brigade, road repairs, library'; he appears in ten episodes.
- Mr Bolt – the Borough Engineer; the only unseen character, he appears via telephone in two episodes.
- Mr Philby – the mayoral driver; in his smart chauffeur's uniform, he appears in eight episodes.
- Mr Craddock – the Park Keeper; his theme song is 'Silver paper, toffee paper, dirty piece of cardboard'; he appears in eight episodes.

=== The Townspeople ===
- Mr 'Chippy' Minton – the carpenter; his theme song is 'I like my job as a carpenter'; he appears in every episode.
- Mrs Dora Minton – Chippy's wife; she appears in five episodes.
- Nibs Minton – Chippy & Dora's son; he works as his father's apprentice, and appears in every episode. He apparently has at least one sibling, because his mother refers to her and Chippy's 'children' in Episode 8: however the sibling(s) never appear.
- Mr Munnings – the printer; his theme song is 'I line up all the letters'; he appears in the opening titles, and in the storyline of eleven episodes.
- Miss Lovelace – the hat maker; her shop front uses the more formal title 'milliner'; her theme song is 'A hat for a young girl'; she appears in the opening titles, and in the storyline of eleven episodes; she is usually accompanied by her three Pekingese dogs Mitzi, Daphne, and Lulu.
- Mr Clamp – the greengrocer; his shop is 'J Clamp & Son' although his son is never seen (unless Mr Clamp is himself the son). His theme song is 'Come buy my vegetables'; he appears in the opening titles, and in the storylines of nine episodes.
- Mrs Cobbit – the flower seller; her theme song is 'Roses, roses, buy my red roses'; she appears in the opening titles, and in the storyline of every episode; in episode 3 it is revealed that she has not missed a day's work in the town square for forty years, except Sundays.
- Mr Platt – the clockmaker; his theme song is 'Clocks are like people'; he appears in every episode, although unseen (behind his door) in episode 9; he keeps racing-pigeons which feature in episode 12.
- Police Constable Potter – Trumpton's policeman; he appears in the opening titles, and in the closing bandstand scene of every episode, and also in the storyline of five episodes; in episode 9 he is equipped with a police motorcycle like his colleague PC McGarry who patrols Camberwick Green.
- Mr Robinson – the window cleaner; his theme song is 'It is hard to see out'; he appears in five episodes, although only in the background scenes of episodes 1, 2, 4, and 6; he stars in episode 9.
- Mr Toni Antonio – the ice-cream seller; his theme song is 'Tingaling-aling-aling, here's the ice-cream van'; he appears in the closing bandstand scene of every episode, but also in the storyline of episodes 3 and 6.
- Mr Nick Fisher – the bill sticker; his theme song is 'Pasting up the posters, sticking up the bills'; he appears in two episodes.
- Mr Walter Harkin – the painter and decorator; his firm is named "Harkin Brothers", although his brother is never seen; his theme song is 'People will ask me which colour to use'; he appears in the closing bandstand scene of every episode; he also has a minor appearance in episode 2 and a starring role in episode 5.
- Mr Wilkins – the plumber; his theme song is 'Hot water heater takes too long to heat'; he appears in only one episode.
- Mr Wantage – the telephone engineer; his theme song is 'Ring ring, I work for Post Office Telephones'; he appears in only one episode.
- Fred – the telephone engineer; he is assistant to Mr Wantage, and likewise appears in only one episode.
- Raggy Dan – the rag-and-bone man; his theme song is 'Rags, bottles, and bones, I cry'; he appears in only one episode.

=== Visitors to Trumpton ===
- Auntie – the aunt of Fireman Cuthbert; she appears in only one episode.
- The Artist – he visits Trumpton to paint, appearing in only one episode.

=== Visitors from Camberwick Green ===
As Camberwick Green is only two miles from Trumpton it is not surprising that many of the familiar Camberwick Green characters make an appearance.

- Mr Crockett – the garage owner; he appears with his son in episode 1, watching the band concert, and he has a starring role in episode 4.
- Mr Jonathan Bell – Farmer Bell often visits Trumpton, and may be seen in background shots in several episodes; he is also in the closing crowd scene at the band concert.
- Mr Thomas Tripp – the milkman; he appears in the opening titles, and in the closing bandstand scene, but has no part in any of the episode storylines.
- Mr Roger Varley – the chimney sweep; he appears in three episodes, attending band concerts, but has no part in any storyline.
- Mrs Honeyman – she appears in the background of episodes 1 and 2.

== Remastered version ==
In 2011, BBC Studios and Post Production digitally restored all 39 episodes of the Trumptonshire trilogy (Camberwick Green, Trumpton and Chigley) after William Mollett, son-in-law of the creator Gordon Murray, found some original footage in an attic. He then approached the BBC to see if it could track down the missing 40‐year‐old original footage, which was eventually traced to the BBC broadcast archive (now in Perivale, west London) but it soon became very clear that its age meant that restoration would be a difficult and delicate task. Murray and Mollett enlisted the expertise of BBC Studios and Post Production, which cleaned, scanned and digitally restored the film footage frame by frame.

== Appearances in popular culture ==
- The early 1980s BBC comedy show Three of a Kind featured a spoof of Trumpton entitled 'Scumton', with characters 'Vic the Vandal', 'Mrs Pensioner' and 'PC Pig'.
- In 1986, the English indie band Half Man Half Biscuit released an EP, The Trumpton Riots, whose title track describes an insurrection on the streets of Trumpton.
- Half Man Half Biscuit also referenced Trumpton on the song "Time Flies By When You're the Driver of a Train", a parody of the "Train Song" from sister programme Chigley, on the album Back in the DHSS. The lyrics of the parody cite such things as drug use and football hooliganism.
- In 1987, a sketch named "Trumpton Raid" appeared in Alas Smith and Jones's series four. Smith is a news reader on the telephone to Jones (as "Mike Airey" Live from Trumpton) reporting on an early morning raid by American F-111 aircraft on Trumpton.
- In the UK in the early 1990s there were several dance music tracks based on children's TV programmes or short educational films. The Prodigy released the track "Charly" in 1991 which was then promptly followed in 1992 by "Sesame's Treet" by the Smart E's and "A Trip To Trumpton" by Urban Hype, which was based on the original Trumpton music by Freddie Phillips with heavy use of Trumpton samples.
- Aired 20 April 2007, in the second episode of season four 'Conference', Peep Show's Alan Johnson addresses the Project Zeus team and rhetorically posits as to whether 'the inventors of google sat around watching Trumpton'.
- At the 2007 Edinburgh Fringe, Phill Jupitus and Brian Cant presented Trumptonshire Tales. The format consisted of Jupitus interviewing Cant and introducing clips from the series.
- In 2009, Chippy Minton appeared in "The Official BBC Children in Need Medley" music video; he appears at the end of the video and is told by Big Chris from Roary the Racing Car that he missed the whole performance. Miss Lovelace and Windy Miller also appear in the video.
- In its explanation of the fiscal multiplier, the BBC radio programme More or Less used the Trumpton economy as a model. Notably, firefighter Dibble was laid off due to the 2008 financial crisis. (8 April 2011)
- In September 2014, a spoof Twitter account @Trumpton_UKIP was created to parody the accounts of UKIP branches. Initially, the account received little notice: however, several weeks later, during a period when the party had been warning members to be aware of possible fake accounts designed to discredit them, UKIP MEP David Coburn encouraged his own Twitter followers to report the spoof account as a fake, leading to widespread media coverage.
- The music video for Radiohead's 2016 single "Burn the Witch" is an animation in the style of Bob Bura and John Hardwick which "crosses Trumpton and The Wicker Man".
- In December 2016 after Donald Trump won the U.S. presidential election, Huffington Post created a parody video imagining what Trumpton would be like with Trump as the mayor. Original scenes were re-used with a dubbed imitation of Cant narrating satirical lines instead. The famous opening lines are changed to "Here is the clock, the Trumpton clock; telling the time, time to make Trumpton great again – yes, it's time to drain the swamp!" The video satirises various controversies of Trump's election campaign such as proposals to bar entry to Muslims and to build a border wall with Mexico (figuratively represented by Chigley), allegations of sexual assaults on women, and admiration for President Vladimir Putin.

== Home media ==
In 1984, 17 years after the broadcasts on BBC in 1967. Longman Video released eight of the episodes on video as part of its Children's Treasury collection. There were two releases, each containing four episodes

VHS video title	Year of release	Episodes
Trumpton (SLL 5022)	1983	"Nick Fisher the Bill Poster"; "Miss Lovelace and the Mayor's Hat"; "Mrs Cobbit and the Ice Cream Man"; "Miss Lovelace and the Statue"
Trumpton 2 (SLL 5028)	1984	"Mr Platt and the Painter"; "The Mayor's Birthday"; "Telephones"; "The Rag and Bone Man"

In 1989, the BBC released a video with the last three episodes (including ep13 The Greenhouse as the first episode, ep11 The Plumber as the second episode and ep12 Pigeons as last episode).

VHS video title	Year of release	Episodes
Trumpton 1: The Greenhouse (BBCV 4230)	10 April 1989	"The Greenhouse"; "The Plumber"; "Pigeons"

Then, in 1996–1997 Telstar Video Entertainment as part of its 'Star Kids' range released two videos.

VHS video title	Year of release	Episodes
A Trip to Trumpton (TVE 3012)	1996	"Nick Fisher the Bill Poster"; "Miss Lovelace and the Mayor's Hat"; "Mrs Cobbit and the Ice Cream Man"; "Miss Lovelace and the Statue"
Tales from Trumpton Town (TVE 3020)	1997	"The Mayor's Birthday"; "Mr Platt and the Painter"; "The Rag and Bone Man"; "Telephones"

In 2002 a three-DVD set entitled The Complete Collection was issued by Telstar Video Entertainment Limited (TDVD9033). It featured one disc each of Trumpton, Camberwick Green and Chigley, each disc having all 13 episodes of the respective series.

== Credits ==
- Music: Freddie Phillips
- Narrator: Brian Cant
- Script: Alison Prince
- Sets: Andrew & Margaret Brownfoot
- Animation: Bob Bura, John Hardwick
- Assisted by: Colin Large, Len Palace, Pasquale Ferrari
- Devised & Produced by Gordon Murray Puppets Ltd 1967.
