= Chigley =

1969 British stop-motion animated TV series

- Title card
- Genre: Stop motion animation
- Written by: Gordon Murray
- Narrated by: Brian Cant
- Theme music composer: Freddie Phillips
- Country of origin: United Kingdom
- Original language: English
- No. of series: 1
- No. of episodes: 13

Production
- Producer: Gordon Murray
- Animator: Bura and Hardwick
- Running time: 15 minutes
- Production company: Gordon Murray Productions

Original release
- Network: BBC1
- Release: 6 October – 29 December 1969

Related
- Camberwick Green Trumpton

Chigley is the third stop-motion children's television series in Gordon Murray's Trumptonshire trilogy. Production details are identical to Camberwick Green and Trumpton.

As in Camberwick Green and Trumpton, the action centres on a small community, the village of Chigley, near Camberwick Green in Trumptonshire. Chigley is more of an industrial area than Camberwick Green and Trumpton.

A digitally restored version of the series from the rediscovered original film masters emerged in 2012.

== Background, overview, story and structure ==
Winkstead Hall, a stately home, is central to life in Chigley. The aristocratic owner, Lord Belborough, and his butler Brackett also operate a heritage railway. They are called on to transport or collect goods in every episode, much to Lord Belborough's delight, as he loves driving the engine, Bessie. Another character frequently delighted by these excursions is Winnie Farthing, whom Lord Belborough and Brackett nearly always invite to join them for a train ride. The notable song unique to Chigley, "Time flies by when I'm the driver of a train", was always sung during these sequences. Winkstead Hall and its grounds are regularly opened to the public, who have access to the picture gallery and tea gardens (both regularly seen). Other parts of the Hall and its estate which also feature in the programmes include the library, the hall, the kitchen garden (and greenhouses), the engine shed (home of Bessie), and the pump room (home of Binnie, Lord Belborough's stationary steam beam engine).

Chigley features many guest appearances by characters from the previous two series. This was at least partly for economic reasons, as it allowed the re-use of theme songs and puppets, thus saving money on recording and manufacture.

Lord Belborough invites everyone to the grounds of Winkstead Hall after the daily 6 o'clock whistle (which marks the end of the day's work at the local biscuit factory), when he plays his vintage Dutch organ, while the workers dance. This scene forms the conclusion of each episode.

== Episodes ==
Episode titles were given in Radio Times but were not shown on-screen.

No.	Title	Original release date
1	"Lord Belborough's Secret"	6 October 1969
2	"Bessie to the Rescue"	13 October 1969
3	"The Balloon Flight"	20 October 1969
4	"The Fountain"	27 October 1969
5	"The Garden Wall"	3 November 1969
6	"Binnie and Bessie"	10 November 1969
7	"Lord Belborough's Lucky Day"	17 November 1969
8	"The Broken Bridge"	24 November 1969
9	"Clay for Mr Farthing"	1 December 1969
10	"Trouble with the Crane"	8 December 1969
11	"Apples Galore"	15 December 1969
12	"Willie Munn"	22 December 1969
13	"A Present for Lord Belborough"	29 December 1969

== Characters ==
=== Winkstead Hall ===
The Winkstead Hall estate is a large stately home whose activities, including a heritage railway, dominate life in Chigley village.

- Lord Belborough – the owner of the hall, a peer of the realm, and driver of the steam locomotive Bessie; he appears in every episode.
- Mr Brackett – Lord Belborough's butler, and fireman on the steam railway; he appears in every episode.
- Mr Bilton – Lord Belborough's gardener, who suffers with rheumatism; he appears in 3 episodes.
- Mr Roger Varley – the Camberwick Green chimney sweep is also employed part-time at Winkstead Hall as maintenance engineer for the steam engines Bessie and Binnie; he appears in 2 episodes.

=== The villagers ===
Only a relatively small number of Chigley villagers are introduced in the series, as many storylines involve existing Trumpton or Camberwick Green characters visiting Chigley.

- Mr Swallow – the wharfinger at Treddle's Wharf, at the intersection of Trumpton Canal with both road and rail networks; he appears in 10 episodes.
- Mr Harry Farthing – the potter at Chigley Pottery, who is also a sculptor; he appears in 8 episodes.
- Winnie Farthing – the potter's daughter; a frequent train passenger, she appears in 10 episodes.
- Mr S. Rumpling – the bargee, whose canal boat (based at Chigley and registered at Trumpton) is a major source of supply to the village; he appears in 6 episodes.
- Mr Clutterbuck – the local builder; he appears in 2 episodes.
- Horace – a labourer employed by Mr Clutterbuck; he appears in 1 episode.
- Cyril – a labourer employed by Mr Clutterbuck; he appears in 1 episode.
- Corporation dustmen – the two corporation dustmen, one of whom is named as Harry, appear in 1 episode.
- Dancing women – two unnamed Chigley women dance with the factory workers at the six o'clock whistle; they appear in all 13 episodes.

=== The biscuit factory ===
The factory is the village's chief source of employment. Cresswell's Chigley Biscuits is the company which owns and operates the facility, and operates a fleet of delivery lorries transporting the finished biscuits from the factory to the railway station at Wintlebury.

- Mr Cresswell – the owner and general manager of the factory; he appears in 4 episodes, and is referenced in a fifth.
- Mr Fletcher – the loading bay supervisor; he appears in the closing dance scene of every episode, and in the storyline of 3 episodes.
- Mr McGregor – one of the delivery drivers; he is chiefly known for being unavailable for work in episode 12.
- Mr Patterson – one of the delivery drivers; he is commended for his skill in not knocking down Jimmy Rankin in episode 4.
- Willie Munn – works on the biscuit cutting machine; he is the nephew of Mr Clamp, the Trumpton greengrocer, and he has a starring role in episode 12.
- The workers – a large number of unnamed factory workers are seen throughout the series, in and around the factory, and at the evening dance after the six o'clock whistle; they appear in every episode; the number of workers is unknown, but at least 16, as that number are seen on screen together at the six o'clock whistle.

=== Visitors ===
Chigley was frequently visited by tradesmen and other characters from neighbouring communities, allowing the re-use of Trumpton and Camberwick Green figures.

=== Unseen characters ===
- Mrs Tripp – the milkman's wife
- Mrs McGarry – the policeman's wife
- Millicent Mopp – the doctor's sister
- Mr Wilkins – the Trumpton plumber
- Jimmy Rankin – a boy who narrowly avoided being knocked down by a Cresswell's delivery van

== Home releases ==
In 1984, 15 years after its broadcast on the BBC in 1969, Longman Video released one video with the first four episodes as part of its 'Children's Treasury' collection.

VHS video title	Year of release	Episodes
Chigley (SLL 5025)	1984	"Lord Belborough's Secret"; "Bessie to the Rescue"; "The Balloon Flight"; "The Fountain"

5 years later, in 1989, the BBC released a video with the three more episodes (ep.13 A Present for Lord Belborough, ep.11 Apples Galore and ep.10 Trouble with the Crane).

VHS video title	Year of release	Episodes
Chigley 1- A Present for Lord Belborough (BBCV 4232)	10 April 1989	"A Present for Lord Belborough"; "Apples Galore"; "Trouble with the Crane"

And in 1996–1997, Telstar Video Entertainment released two videos as part of its 'Star Kids' range.

VHS video title	Year of release	Episodes
Let's Visit Chigley (TVE 3014)	7 October 1996	"Bessie to the Rescue"; "Lord Belborough's Secret"; "The Balloon Flight"; "The Fountain"
A Ride To Chigley (TVE 3021)	12 May 1997	"Trouble with the Crane"; "A Present for Lord Belborough"; "Apples Galore"; "The Broken Bridge"

In 2011, Chigley and the two earlier series Camberwick Green and Trumpton were digitally-restored from the rediscovered original film masters.

== Credits ==
- Script & Puppets: Gordon Murray
- Music: Freddie Phillips
- Narrator: Brian Cant
- Sets: Andrew & Margaret Brownfoot
- Animation: Bob Bura & John Hardwick
- Assistant Animators: Pasquale Ferrari, George Dubouch
- Recording & Sound Effects: Music Features MF
- A Gordon Murray Production MCMLXIX.

== Cultural references ==
- The indie group Half Man Half Biscuit parodied the Chigley Train Song in their song "Time Flies By (When You're the Driver of a Train)". They also released a single entitled "The Trumpton riots" containing many character references.
- In the comic book Preacher, the train song was sung by Jesus de Sade, a sexually depraved character, whilst riding a bicycle, naked.
- The Oasis song "Champagne Supernova" contains the line "Slowly walking down the hall, faster than a cannonball". This was, according to lead guitarist and songwriter Noel Gallagher, inspired by Brackett the butler from Chigley.
- In the first episode of the 2003 BBC sitcom Early Doors, bar patrons Joe and Duffy et al. tease bartender Ken about his hobby train set by serenading him with the first line of the Chigley Train Song.
