= Gordon Murray (puppeteer) =

British producer and puppeteer

- Born: 3 May 1921; London, England
- Died: 30 June 2016 (aged 95); London, England
- Education: Emanuel School, London
- Occupations: Television producer, puppeteer
- Years active: 1950–1989, 1989–1992
- Notable work: Camberwick Green; Trumpton; Chigley
- Spouse: Enid Martin
- Children: 2

Gordon Murray (3 May 1921 – 30 June 2016) was a British television producer and puppeteer. He created and wrote some of the most repeated children's television programmes ever seen in Britain. Camberwick Green, Trumpton, and Chigley, collectively known as the Trumptonshire Trilogy, were all produced by the company he founded.

== Early life and television career ==
Murray was always interested in puppets, and as a child he created and performed shows to friends and family at home. Speaking in 1979 he said, "I have been interested in puppets ever since I was a child. My enthusiasm was greatly stimulated, I remember, by a visit to the Victoria Palace when I was about eight to see Delvain's Marionettes on the variety bill. Later, of course, I avidly read the Whanslaw books."

In 1954, he joined the Television Puppet Theatre, producing various puppet plays using marionettes. For the Toytown plays based on a long-running Children's Hour radio series, however, he decided to use rod puppets to emulate S.G. Hulme Beaman’s original character designs. Initially the shows he worked on went out live but frustrated by the hit and miss approach of live work, he developed his own film studio and shot his own films. In 1955, he created the series A Rubovian Legend, to break the traditions of British puppetry at the time. The puppets in the first four plays were designed by Kim Allen, which dissatisfied Murray, who decided to revamp in 1958 with his own puppets. In 1964, A Rubovian Legend ended, due to the BBC wanting to drop many of its black-and-white programmes in favour of colour. Two years later however, Murray transitioned to stop-motion.

== Trumptonshire years ==
Murray created The Trumptonshire Trilogy: Camberwick Green which broadcast in 1966 (the first children's programme in colour on the BBC), Trumpton in 1967 and Chigley in 1969. Murray had originally named 'Camberwick Green' 'Candlewick Green', but then found the name had been misspelled on the contract for 13 episodes: however, he did not mind, as he liked the new title and was in need of money. Murray would create the vehicles, puppets and scripts to the studio, and Bura and Hardwick would animate them. Realising that the string-based marionettes used previously would look old-fashioned, he looked to Eastern Europe for the stop motion animation technique he would use.

One far-sighted contribution by Bura and Hardwick was their insistence on shooting Camberwick Green in both black-and-white and colour. Only Chigley first went out after BBC 1 adopted broadcasting in colour, but their decision meant that the programmes were broadcast regularly for longer than might otherwise have been the case.

Following Chigley, in 1969 it was six years before Murray had a new series on television, a stop-motion remake of A Rubovian Legend simply titled Rubovia. His next work was Skip and Fuffy, which was broadcast within Multi-Coloured Swap Shop in 1978; his final series, The Gublins, was broadcast in 1979.

== After television ==
After retiring from animation, Murray produced and self-marketed more than thirty-four different limited-edition miniature books under the Silver Thimble Books imprint. Bound entirely by hand, they contained miniature watercolour paintings, special embroidered covers and bindings, and slip cases. A complete set of these books is held in the Charlotte M. Smith Collection of Miniature Books in the library of the University of Iowa.

In the 1980s, he burnt all the remaining puppets and sets from the Trumptonshire shows, except for one soldier from Camberwick Green that escaped the fire. It was given by his eldest daughter to a friend who kept it in a shoe box. It was later auctioned by Christie's in May 2003 but failed to meet the reserve price.

A 2009 poll by Channel 4 television ranked Trumpton as the 22nd most popular children's television show. Murray's work was later revived, in a series of television adverts for Porridge Oats, and also in adverts for bread in 1988. His puppets were used most recently in the cult BBC drama Life on Mars, in a scene where the character Sam Tyler is hallucinating.

In January 2012, all 39 original episodes of the Trumptonshire trilogy were digitally restored after Murray found some boxes of original footage of the series in his attic at home and handed them over to the BBC for restoration.

== Personal life and death ==
Murray was married to Enid Martin, who predeceased him. He died on 30 June 2016, aged 95.

== Filmography ==
- Cap O’ Rushes (1954)
- Oscar the Seal (1954)
- Harlequinade (1954)
- The Travelling Musicians (1955)
- Two of Everything (1955)
- Will O’ the Gris (1955)
- The Woodentops (1955–1956, puppeteer of Spotty Dog)
- A Rubovian Legend (1955–1956, 1958–1964)
- Toytown (1956–1958)
- The Bird of Truth (1956)
- The Emperor’s Nightingale (1957)
- Captain Pugwash (1957–1965)
- Beauty and the Beast (1957)
- The Emperor’s New Clothes (1958)
- The Winkleburg Armourer (1958)
- The Petrified Princess (1959)
- Sketch Club (1959)
- The King of the Golden River (1959)
- The Crumpot Candles (1960)
- The Magic Tree (1960)
- The Adventures of Alice (1960)
- The Dancing Princess (1962)
- Camberwick Green – 1966
- Trumpton – 1967
- Chigley – 1969
- Rubovia – 1976
- The Gublins – 1979
