= 1958 in British television =

This is a list of British television related events from 1958.

== Events ==
=== January ===
- 14 January – TWW, the first ITV franchise for South Wales and the West of England, goes on the air.

=== February ===
- 13 February – A by-election is covered on British television for the first time, when Granada broadcasts coverage of the 1958 Rochdale by-election; Broadcaster Ludovic Kennedy takes second place for the Liberals, considerably increasing their share of the vote.
- 17 February – Pope Pius XII designates St. Clare of Assisi as the patron saint of television. Thereafter, placing her icon on a television set is said to improve reception.
- 18 February – Footage of the annual Shrove Tuesday Atherstone Ball Game is shown on television for the first time.

=== March ===
- 31 March – Debut of the BBC's serial Starr and Company, set in an engineering firm. The programme is aired for nine months.

=== April ===
- 14 April — The newly magnetic videotape machine Vision Electronic Recording Apparatus or VERA for short, is given a live demonstration on air in Panorama, where Richard Dimbleby, seated by a clock, talks for a couple of minutes about the new method of vision recording with an instant playback. The tape is then wound back and replayed. The picture is slightly watery, but watchable, and instant playback is something completely new.

=== May ===
- 5 May – First experimental transmissions of a 625-line television service.
- 10 May – The BBC broadcasts rugby league's Challenge Cup final for the fourth time, and this marks the start of annual coverage of the final.

=== July ===
- 13–19 July – ITV shows coverage of the Commonwealth Games. This is the only time that ITV has covered the event.

=== August ===
- 30 August – Southern Television, the ITV franchise for the South of England, goes on the air.

=== September ===
- 13 September – ITV first screens Oh Boy!, the first teenage all-music show on British television, produced by Jack Good, made by ABC Weekend TV and broadcast live on early Saturday evenings from the Hackney Empire with Lord Rockingham's XI assembled as the house band. This follows late-night pilots screened in the midlands on 15 and 29 June.

=== October ===
- 11 October – The Saturday afternoon sports programme Grandstand debuts on the BBC Television Service. It airs until January 2007.
- 16 October – Blue Peter, which would go on to become the world's longest-running children's television programme, debuts on the BBC Television Service. It continues to air into the 2020s.
- 28 October – The State Opening of Parliament is broadcast on television for the first time.

=== November ===
- 30 November – During the live broadcast of the Armchair Theatre play Underground on the ITV network, actor Gareth Jones has a fatal heart attack between two of his scenes while in make-up.

=== December ===
- 22 December – The BBC begins showing the science fiction drama series Quatermass and the Pit, starring André Morell as Professor Bernard Quatermass.

=== Undated ===
- Oxo stock cubes are first promoted on television in a series of advertisements depicting "Life with Katie" and the "Oxo family" which run until 1999.

== Debuts ==
=== BBC Television Service/BBC TV ===
- 1 January – Big Guns (1958)
- 4 January – Saturday Playhouse (1958–1961)
- 24 January – Pride and Prejudice (1958)
- February – Your Life in Their Hands (1958–1964; 1979–1987; 1991)
- 2 February – Monitor (1958–1965)
- 7 February – Run To Earth (1958)
- 9 February – The Government Inspector (1958)
- 12 February – More Than Robbery (1958)
- March – Starr and Company (1958)
- 7 March – The Diary of Samuel Pepys (1958)
- 22 March – Captain Moonlight – Man of Mystery (1958)
- 26 March – Sammy (1958)
- 8 April – Television Playwright (1958–1959)
- 11 April – The Common Room (1958–1959)
- 22 April – Railway Roundabout (1958–1962)
- 7 May – (Scotland) White Heather Club (1958–1968)
- 13 May – The Dangerous Game (1958)
- 17 May – Duty Bound (1958)
- 1 June – The Adventures of Ben Gunn (1958)
- 14 June – The Black and White Minstrel Show (1958–1978)
- 24 June – The Firm of Girdlestone (1958)
- 5 July – Fair Game (1958)
- 20 July – Queen's Champion (1958)
- 16 August – Charlesworth at Large (1958)
- 6 September – Jennings at School (1958)
- 12 September – Champion Road (1958)
- 14 September – Little Women (1958)
- 29 September – Leave It to Todhunter (1958)
- 11 October – Grandstand (1958–2007)
- 14 October – Yesterday's Enemy (1958)
- 16 October – Blue Peter (1958–2025)
- 4 November – The Mad O'Haras (1958)
- 7 November – Our Mutual Friend (1958–1959)
- 10 November – Solo for Canary (1958)
- 11 November – Charlie Drake (1958–1960)
- 4 December – Private Investigator (1958–1959)
- 22 December – Quatermass and the Pit (1958–1959)

=== ITV ===
- 1 January – Junior Criss Cross Quiz (1958–1967)
- 3 January
  - Let's Get Together (1958–1959)
  - People and Places (1958–1963, 1967–1973)
- 5 January – Ivanhoe (1958–1959)
- 14 January – Gwlad y Gan (1958–1964)
- 15 January – Amser Te (1958–1968)
- 27 January – Popeye (1958–1975)
- 4 February – East End, West End (1958)
- 14 February – Sea Hunt (1957–1961)
- 22 February – Sword of Freedom (1958–1961)
- 18 March – Hotel Imperial (1958–1960)
- 22 March
  - Cheyenne (1957–1963)
  - The Killing Stones (1958)
- 30 March – Time Out for Peggy (1958)
- 5 April – African Patrol (1958–1959)
- 7 April – Wagon Train (1957–1962)
- 13 April – The Sunday Break (1958–1967)
- 15 April – Lucky Dip (1958–1959)
- 26 April – The Truth About Melandrinos (1958)
- 30 June – My Wife and I (1958)
- 1 July – The Verdict is Yours (1958–1962)
- 6 July – Dial 999 (1958–1959)
- 13 September
  - Oh Boy! (1958–1959)
  - Mary Britten, M.D. (1958)
  - Maverick (1957–1962)
- 14 September
  - Dotto (1958–1960)
  - The Invisible Man (1958–1959)
- 15 September – Make Me Laugh (1958)
- 19 September – The Larkins (1958–1960; 1963–1964)
- 20 September – The Adventures of William Tell (1958–1959)
- 26 September – Educating Archie (1958–1959)
- 6 October – Cannonball (1958–1959)
- 12 October – After Hours (1958–1959)
- 6 December – All Aboard (1958–1959)
- Unknown
  - Dick and the Duchess (1958–1959)
  - Martin Kane, Private Eye (1958–1959)

== Continuing television shows ==
=== 1920s ===
- BBC Wimbledon (1927–1939, 1946–2019, 2021–present)

=== 1930s ===
- Trooping the Colour (1937–1939, 1946–2019, 2023–present)
- The Boat Race (1938–1939, 1946–2019, 2021–present)
- BBC Cricket (1939, 1946–1999, 2020–present)

=== 1940s ===
- The Ed Sullivan Show (1948–1971)
- Come Dancing (1949–1998)

=== 1950s ===
- Andy Pandy (1950–1970, 2002–2005)
- What's My Line? (1951–1964, 1984–1996)
- All Your Own (1952–1961)
- Watch with Mother (1952–1975)
- Rag, Tag and Bobtail (1953–1965)
- The Good Old Days (1953–1983)
- Panorama (1953–present)
- The Adventures of Robin Hood (1955–1960)
- Picture Book (1955–1965)
- Sunday Night at the London Palladium (1955–1967, 1973–1974)
- Take Your Pick! (1955–1968, 1992–1998)
- Double Your Money (1955–1968)
- Dixon of Dock Green (1955–1976)
- Crackerjack (1955–1970, 1972–1984, 2020–2021)
- Hancock's Half Hour (1956–1961)
- ITV Wimbledon (1956–1968)
- Opportunity Knocks (1956–1978, 1987–1990)
- This Week (1956–1978, 1986–1992)
- Armchair Theatre (1956–1974)
- What the Papers Say (1956–2008)
- The Army Game (1957–1961)
- The Sky at Night (1957–present)
- The Woody Woodpecker Show (1957–1997)

== Ending this year ==
- The Flower Pot Men (1952–1958, 2001–2002)
- The Woodentops (1955–1958)
- Educated Evans (1957–1958)
- Living It Up (1957–1958)
- Six-Five Special (1957–1958)

== Births ==
- 10 January – Caroline Langrishe, actress
- 24 January – Jools Holland, pianist and television presenter
- 29 January – Linda Smith, comedian (died 2006)
- 11 February – Michael Jackson, television executive
- 20 February – James Wilby, actor
- 3 March – Miranda Richardson, comedy actress
- 7 March – Rik Mayall, actor, comedian and writer (died 2014)
- 13 March – Linda Robson, actress
- 14 March – Francine Stock, radio and television presenter and author
- 21 March – Gary Oldman, actor
- 14 April – Peter Capaldi, Scottish actor and director
- 3 May – Sandi Toksvig, Danish-born comedy performer, media presenter and writer
- 17 May – Paul Whitehouse, Welsh comedy writer-performer
- 18 May – Toyah Willcox, actress and singer
- 22 May – Denise Welch, actress and television presenter
- 6 July – Jennifer Saunders, comedy writer-performer
- 24 July – Joe McGann, actor
- 29 July – Simon Nye, screenwriter
- 31 July – Sue Jenkins, actress
- 29 August – Lenny Henry, actor and comedian
- 30 August – Muriel Gray, Scottish author, broadcaster and journalist
- 13 September – Bobby Davro, actor and comedian
- 18 September – Linda Lusardi, model, actress and television presenter
- 21 September
  - Simon Mayo, television and radio presenter
  - Penny Smith, television presenter
- 25 October – Simon Gipps-Kent, actor (died 1987)
- 31 October – Debbie McGee, television, radio and stage performer
- 1 December – Keith Chapman, children's television programme creator
- 6 December – Nick Park, animated film maker

== Deaths ==
- 30 November – Gareth Jones, Welsh actor (born 1925)

== See also ==
- 1958 in British music
- 1958 in the United Kingdom
- List of British films of 1958
