= Pippin (comics) =

Pippin

Publication information
- Publisher: Polystyle Publications
- Schedule: Weekly
- Format: Ongoing series
- Genre: Children's
- Publication date: 24 September 1966 – 26 September 1986
- No. of issues: 1,044
- Main character: Pippin from The Pogles

Creative team
- Artist(s): Neville Main, Bill Melvin

Pippin was a UK children's comic, published by Polystyle Publications between 1966 and 1986, featuring characters from British pre-school television programmes. Stories were generally of four or eight numbered panels, with a short sentence below each illustration (similar to Rupert), although some stories did appear in prose form.

Regular stories in the 1960s and 1970s included The Pogles (whose Pippin character gave the comic its name), Bizzy Lizzy, Joe, The Woodentops, Andy Pandy, Bill and Ben, Camberwick Green, Trumpton, Chigley, Tich and Quackers, Larry the Lamb in Toytown, Mary, Mungo and Midge, The Moonbeans, Tales of the Riverbank, The Herbs, Mr Benn, Teddy Edward, Barnaby the Bear, Ivor the Engine, Rubovia and Sooty and Sweep. Andy Pandy and Bill and Ben had also appeared regularly in Robin.

Towards the end of the Pippin's run, programmes featured in the comic included SuperTed, The Adventures of Portland Bill, Munch Bunch and Morph.

Each issue of Pippin was about 16 pages long, in color and black and white, and featured a puzzle page, readers’ letters and photographs, and a Bible story with characters portrayed by children in costume. Hardback Pippin annuals were published from 1967 to 1986 (covering the years 1968 to 1987), containing new stories, puzzles, and regular holiday specials. Around 1983, a special winter edition reprinted strips from the past 15 years (“ask your older brothers or sisters”).

A companion comic, Playland, launched in 1968 and ran alongside Pippin until 1975, when the two titles merged under Pippin in Playland. Both continued to issue separate annuals at Christmas. Several strips, including Sooty, Andy Pandy, The Herbs, and Camberwick Green, appeared in both comics at different times.

Pippin artists included Neville Main, Bill Melvin and Peter Longden, as well as original artwork from Peter Firmin for stories based on Bagpuss and Ivor the Engine.

The first edition was published on 24 September 1966, and the final edition (number 1044) appeared on 26 September 1986, in which it was announced that the comic would be merging with Buttons. The first issue of Buttons to include Pippin was issue Number 261, dated 27 September 1986, and included a souvenir edition of Pippin (subtitled issue number 1045). Despite the amalgamation, only two programmes from Pippin continued to appear in Buttons; Jimbo and the Jet Set and Mop and Smiff.
