= Bizzy Lizzy =

British children's TV series from the 1960s

- Written by: Maria Bird; Freda Lingstrom
- Narrated by: Julie Stevens
- Music by: Gillian Norton
- Country of origin: United Kingdom
- Original language: English
- No. of series: 1
- No. of episodes: 13

Production
- Producer: Ursula Eason
- Animators: Audrey Atterbury; Molly Gibson; Christopher Leith
- Production company: Westerham Arts Films Limited

Original release
- Network: BBC1
- Release: 4 April – 27 June 1967

Bizzy Lizzy is a British children's television series from the 1960s. Bizzy Lizzy is a little girl whose dress has a magic flower. When she touches it, her wishes come true – but if she makes more than four wishes in a day, all her previous wishes are undone. Her first wish each day is to make her Eskimo doll, Little Mo, come to life.

Watch with Mother co-producer Maria Bird narrated the 'Bizzy Lizzy' stories.

Bizzy Lizzy stories originally formed part of the Watch with Mother's Picture Book series in the early 1960s, before getting her thirteen-part series in 1967.

The comic Pippin featured regular Bizzy Lizzy adventures from 1967 onwards.

== Episodes ==
=== Series (1967) ===
No.	Title	Original release date
1	"Little Mo"	4 April 1967
2	"The Balloon"	11 April 1967
3	"The Weather House"	18 April 1967
4	"Toys"	25 April 1967
5	"Man in the Moon"	2 May 1967
6	"The Ring"	9 May 1967
7	"The Mountain"	16 May 1967
8	"The Snowman"	23 May 1967
9	"The Bears"	30 May 1967
10	"The Ladybird"	6 June 1967
11	"The Sand-castle"	13 June 1967
12	"The Bumble Bee"	20 June 1967
13	"The Money Pig"	27 June 1967
