= Bill and Ben =

The names Bill and Ben, when used together, may refer to:

- Bill and Ben, the Flower Pot Men, 1950s children's television show
  - Bill and Ben (TV series), 2001 reboot of the children's television show
  - Bill and Ben, characters created by Hilda Brabban for the BBC radio programme Listen with Mother, often confused for the Bill and Ben of the Flower Pot Men children's television show
- Bill and Ben, locomotive characters from The Railway Series children's books by Rev. W. Awdry, and the associated TV series Thomas the Tank Engine and Friends.
- "Bill and Ben", a song by the band Catherine Wheel
- Bill and Ben, Bill Valentine and Ben Emerson, heroes in the western fiction book series by Leonard Frank Meares
- Jamie "Bill" Linehan and Ben "Ben" Boyce, host of New Zealand television show Pulp Sport and leaders of the Bill and Ben Party, a joke political party.
- Bill and Ben Porter, main characters in the British sitcom 2point4 Children.
