= Our Mutual Friend (disambiguation) =

Our Mutual Friend is the last novel completed by Charles Dickens.

Our Mutual Friend may also refer to:

- Our Mutual Friend (1958 serial), a British television serial
- Our Mutual Friend (1976 serial), a British television serial
- Our Mutual Friend (1998 serial), a British television serial
- "Our Mutual Friend," a song by Neil Hannon
