= Picture Book (TV series) =

British children's television series (1955–1963)

- Country of origin: United Kingdom
- Original language: English
- No. of series: 2
- No. of episodes: 52

Production
- Running time: 15 minutes (approximate)

Original release
- Network: BBC TV
- Release: 14 February 1955 – 23 September 1963

Picture Book is a BBC children's TV series created by Freda Lingstrom, first broadcast in 1955. It was the Monday programme in the Watch with Mother cycle. Initially introduced by Patricia Driscoll, the programme encouraged children to make things; Driscoll's catch phrase was "Do you think you could do this? – I am sure you could if you tried". She left the programme in 1957 to play the part of Maid Marian in the ITV series The Adventures of Robin Hood. Patricia Driscoll's episodes were repeated until 1963 when they were replaced by a new series of episodes with Vera McKechnie. The programme ran until December 1965 and replaced in the Monday slot by Camberwick Green in January 1966.

The show's opening theme tune was Badinerie, the final movement of Johann Sebastian Bach's Orchestral Suite No. 2 in B minor.

Each Monday, Driscoll or McKechnie would open the Picture Book at a relevant page. Sometimes it would be shown to the camera at a distance, making the pages' content often brief and obscure. Alternatively, the presenter would simply tell the children what the next item would be, sometimes with a still photograph as a continuity link. It was something different every week. The 1963 series featured Sausage, a puppet dachshund who could speak a few words, voiced by Roy Skelton and who generally shared the presentation with Vera McKechnie.

The 1987 VHS release by BBC Video featured an episode including Sausage the puppet dog, the Adventures of the Jolly Jack Tars (a group of sailors), making paper lanterns, growing mustard and cress, and a regular cartoon of a little girl called Bizzy Lizzy, who had a magic flower. The 'Bizzy Lizzy' inserts for Picture Book were narrated by Maria Bird, who also narrated Andy Pandy, The Woodentops and The Flowerpot Men. A further episode was included on a Watch with Mother 2 video released in 1989. The main feature involved the creation of hills and a valley using a sand tray, an item featured regularly in the programme. Both episodes were taken from the 1963 series, presented by Vera McKechnie.
