= Golden Dustman =

The Golden Dustman may refer to:

- Henry Dodd, founder of the Thames barge races
- Nicodemus (Noddy) Boffin, character in Dickens' Our Mutual Friend, possibly based on Dodd
