= Woodentop =

Woodentop may refer to:

- The Woodentops (TV series), a 1950s BBC children's series
- The Woodentops, a British rock band
- Woodentop, a pejorative term used by plain-clothed British police for uniformed police officers
- "Woodentop" (The Bill), the pilot episode of the long-running television programme The Bill
