= Watch with Mother =

British children's television series (1952–1978)

- The opening titles from 1952. The film was reversed so the title appeared to flower.
- Country of origin: United Kingdom
- Original language: English

Production
- Running time: 15 minutes

Original release
- Network: BBC1
- Release: 1952 – 1978, 26 years

Watch with Mother was a cycle of children's programmes created by Freda Lingstrom and Maria Bird. Broadcast by BBC Television from 1952 until 1975, it was the first BBC television series aimed specifically at pre-school children; a development of BBC radio's equivalent Listen with Mother, which had begun two years earlier. In accordance with its intended target audience of pre-school children viewing with their mothers, Watch with Mother was initially broadcast between 4:00 pm and 4:15 pm, post-afternoon nap and before the older children came home from school.

The choice of Watch with Mother for the title of the series was intended "to deflect fears that television might become a nursemaid to children and encourage bad mothering".

== Show cycles ==
Although Andy Pandy had been regularly broadcast every week since mid-1950 (normally on Tuesdays), and was joined by Flower Pot Men in December 1952 (normally on Wednesdays), the name Watch with Mother was not adopted until April 1953, shortly before the programming was expanded to three afternoons a week with the addition of Rag, Tag and Bobtail that September. The "classic" cycle of shows was in place by September 1955, with the first showing of The Woodentops.

Broadcast at 1:30 pm each day, it comprised:

- Picture Book – Mondays, from 1955
- Andy Pandy – Tuesdays
- Flower Pot Men – Wednesdays
- Rag, Tag and Bobtail – Thursdays
- The Woodentops – Fridays, from 1955

Each of the five classic shows actually consisted of only a very small number of episodes, all made on film – and all in black-and-white. Typically, not more than 26 programmes were filmed for each show, this being sufficient for a run of six months as there was only one broadcast per week. The aim was to provide children's programming on the cheap: the BBC Children's department had an extremely tiny budget, and needed a collection of films which could be endlessly repeated, typically in six-monthly cycles, for its undemanding pre-school age audience.

From April 1963, Watch with Mother was moved to 10.45am (with a further slot at 1.30pm from September 1963). Tales of the Riverbank joined the Watch with Mother Monday slot in December 1963, and caused worries that the original five shows would be replaced.

Subsequent shows that occupied the Watch with Mother slots included:

- Camberwick Green – 1966 to 1985
- Pogles' Wood – 1966 to 1973
- Trumpton – 1967 to 1985
- Bizzy Lizzy – 1967 to 1969
- The Herbs – 1968 to 1975
- Chigley – 1969 to 1985
- Mary, Mungo and Midge – 1969 to 1978
- Mr Benn – 1971 to 1993
- Fingerbobs – 1972 to 1984
- Bagpuss – 1974 to 1986
- Clangers – 1969

== From 1978 – See-Saw and legacy ==
In 1978, the Watch with Mother title was dropped, as it was considered to be dated, and the strand was known as See-Saw from 1980 to 1990.

In the early 2000s, the shows Andy Pandy and Flower Pot Men were remade as stop motion animations (the latter as Bill and Ben), which aired on CBeebies.

== Programming ==
Shows included in the Watch with Mother and See-Saw slots were as follows:

Title	# Episodes	First released	Total run (including re-runs)	Presenter/Narrator	Category	Reference
The Adventures of Spot	13	1987	1987 to 1989	Paul Nicholas	Animation	
Along the River	5	1970	1970 to 1975	Rick Jones	Factual	
Along the Seashore	2	1970	1970 to 1975	Tony Soper	Factual	
Along the Trail	6	1972	1972 to 1977	Rick Jones	Factual	
Andy Pandy	26	1950	1950 to 1969	Maria Bird	Puppets	
Andy Pandy	13	1970	1970 to ?	Vera McKechnie	Puppets	
Animal Fair	13	1986	1986 to 1988	Don Spencer	Factual	
Bagpuss	13	1974	1974 to 1986		Animation	
Barnaby	13	1973	1973 to 1979	Charles Collingwood, Colin Jeavons, and Gwendoline Owen		
Bertha	13	1985		Guy Fletcher, Roy Kinnear, and Sheila Walker	Animation	
Bizzy Lizzy	13	1967	1967 to 1969		Animation	
Bod	13	1975	1975 to 1984	Maggie Henderson and John Le Mesurier	Animation	
Bric-a-Brac	12	1980		Brian Cant	Story	
Camberwick Green	13	1966	1966 to 1985	Brian Cant	Stop-motion animation	
Chigley	13	1969	1969 to 1985	Brian Cant	Stop-motion animation	
Chock-a-Block	13	1981		Fred Harris and Carol Leader	Magazine	
Clangers	26	1969			Stop-motion animation	
Fingerbobs	13	1972	1972 to 1984	Rick Jones	Puppets	
Fingermouse	13	1984		Jane Hardy and Iain Lauchlan	Puppets	
Fireman Sam	32	1986	1986 to 1994	John Alderton	Animation	
The Flowerpot Men	26	1952			Puppets	
The Flumps	13	1977	1977 to 1988		Stop-motion animation	
Gran	13	1983	1983 to 1989	Patricia Hayes	Stop-motion animation	
Heads and Tails	26	1977	1977 to 1988	Derek Griffiths	Factual	
The Herbs	13	1968	1968 to 1975	Gordon Rollings	Stop-motion animation	
Hokey-Cokey	26	1983		Chloe Ashcroft, Carol Chell, and Don Spencer		
How Do You Do!	13	1977	1977 to 1981	Carmen Munro		
In the Town	7	1973	1973 to 1977	Gordon Rollings	Factual	
Joe	26	1966	1966 to 1974	Colin Jeavons	Animation	
King Rollo	13	1980		Ray Brooks	Animation	
The Little Misses	13	1983		John Alderton and Pauline Collins	Animation	
Mary, Mungo and Midge	13	1969	1969 to 1978	Richard Baker and Isobel Ryan	Animation	
Mop and Smiff	13	1985		Mike Amatt	Animation	
Mr Benn	13	1971	1971 to 1993	Ray Brooks	Animation	
The Mr Men	28	1974	1974 to 1988	Arthur Lowe	Animation	
On the Farm	6	1970	1970 to 1975	Keith Barron		
Over the Moon	13	1978	1978 to 1982	Sam Dale and Don Spencer	Animation	
Picture Book		1955	1955 to 1963	Patricia Driscoll and Vera McKechnie		
Pie in the Sky	13	1986		Chloe Ashcroft, David Hargreaves, and Ben Thomas		
Pigeon Street	13	1981		George Layton and John Telfer	Animation	
Pinny's House	13	1986		Matilda Thorpe	Animation	
Playboard	13	1976		Christopher Lillicrap		
The Pogles	6	1965		Olwen Griffiths, Oliver Postgate, and Steve Woodman	Stop-motion animation	
Pogles' Wood	26	1966	1966 to 1973	Olwen Griffiths, Oliver Postgate, and Steve Woodman	Stop-motion animation	
Postman Pat	13	1981		Ken Barrie	Stop-motion animation	
Rag, Tag and Bobtail	26	1953		David Enders, Charles E. Stidwell and James Urquhart	Puppets	
Ragtime	26	1973	1973 to 1980	Fred Harris and Maggie Henderson		
Ring-a-Ding	13	1973	1973 to 1977	Derek Griffiths		
Rubovia	6	1976		Gordon Murray and Roy Skelton	Puppets	
Stop - Go!	13	1983		Ben Thomas and Lola Young	Factual	
Tales of the Riverbank	26	1963		Peggy Miller and Johnny Morris	Animation	
Teddy Edward	13	1973	1973 to 1978	Richard Baker		
Thomas	7	1975		Ann Morrish		
Trumpton	13	1967	1967 to 1985	Brian Cant	Stop-motion animation	
Up Our Street	13	1985			Comedy	
The Woodentops	26	1955		Eileen Brown, Peter Hawkins, and Josephina Ray	Puppets	

== UK VHS releases (1987–1993) ==
Between 1987 and 1993, four compilation videos with Watch with Mother shows have been released by the BBC. The first became a bestselling success, and by the end of 1990 was the highest-selling individual VHS release from the Corporation.

VHS Name	Release Year	Episodes
Watch with Mother (BBCV 4091)	5 October 1987	Picture Book: "Paper Lanterns"; Andy Pandy: "Pram"; Flowerpot Men: "Seeds"; Rag, Tag and Bobtail: "The Hazel Twig"; The Woodentops: "Introduction"
Watch with Mother 2 (BBCV 4277)	2 October 1989	Picture Book: "Bush Baby"; Andy Pandy: "The Cart"; Flowerpot Men: "The Potato Man"; Rag, Tag and Bobtail: "Snowballs"; The Woodentops: "Horseshoe"
Watch with Mother: The Next Generation (BBCV 4280)	2 October 1989	Tales of The Riverbank: "A Ride in Guinea's Jeep"; Pogles Wood: "Honey Bees"; The Herbs: "Strawberry Picking"; Mary Mungo and Midge: "The Crane"; Barnaby: "The Circus"
The Very Best of Watch with Mother (BBCV 4941)	5 April 1993	Andy Pandy: "Tricycle"; Flowerpot Men: "Icicles"; Camberwick Green: "Mickey Murphy the Baker"; Muffin the Mule: Muffin and the Squeaking Shoes; The Woodentops: "The Party"

A 45 rpm promotional single was available to radio disc jockeys, for promo only, entitled "Flob-A-Dob-A-Ben", in 1987. The single was not released on general release and was played often as a novelty record by Radio Trent on the Andy Marriott Television Show.

== See also ==
- For the Children, a television programme for school-age children that ran from 1937.
- Children's BBC, the name used to refer to the children's programming block from 1985.
- CBeebies, a free-to-air BBC channel launched in 2002, carrying programming for children five years and under.
