= Vera McKechnie =

British presenter (born 1927)

Vera McKechnie (born c. July 1927) is a British retired television presenter who was one of the first presenters at the start of BBC Children's Television in the early 1950s.

== Television career ==
McKechnie began her career when the BBC resumed TV broadcasts after the Second World War. On BBC Children's Television she narrated the earliest live editions of Andy Pandy from 1950, in which she told a story as it was acted out by string puppets. The programme was aimed at very young children under primary school starting age of five years at the time. The programme was broadcast during the school day and part of a series of five known as Watch with Mother, one of which one was broadcast each weekday. When the broadcasts began, the main BBC transmitters only covered London and the southeast from Alexandra Palace, Birmingham and the Midlands from Sutton Coldfield, and Manchester and the northwest from Holme Moss.

McKechnie was a television in-vision announcer from 1955 until 1960, and later worked for BBC Children's Television as presenter of For Deaf Children, 1956. Other TV work was Focus, 1958 to 1960; Picture Book, 1963 to 1965; narrator, Andy Pandy, 1970.

From 1955 to about 1958 she was the main presenter of Studio E, a magazine programme for older children aged around 9–14. Studio E lasted around 55 minutes and came from the studio of the same name at the BBC's west London studios in Lime Grove, Shepherd's Bush, since demolished.

== Personal life ==
After television she became a teacher, spending 15 years at Roedean School and then in Broadstairs, Kent then St Margaret's School, Bushey.
