= Rex Garner =

British actor and director (1921–2015)

- Born: 1921; Wolverhampton, England
- Died: 17 May 2015 (aged 93–94)
- Occupations: Actor and director
- Children: 7

Rex Garner (1921 – 17 May 2015) was a British born actor and director.

He played Vic Steele, between 1957 and 1959, in Shadow Squad. Among his many British TV appearances he also co-starred in My Wife and I. In 1968 he went to South Africa to join the Academy Theatre, and settled there in 1974. In 1979 joined Pieter Toerien acting and directing plays until 1999. In 1981 he was the director of Tommie Meyer's film "Birds of Paradise". He returned to the UK in the early 2000s.

He was named the best actor in 1983 at the Fleur du Cap Theatre Awards for his role as Father Tim in Mass Appeal.

== Personal life ==
Garner was born in 1921 in Wolverhampton, England. He was married three times; his first wife died, and his second and third marriages ended in divorce. He had seven children. He died 17 May 2015 at the age of 94.
