= Andy Pandy =

British children's TV series (1950–1970, 2002)

- From the 1952 Andy Pandy opening titles. The blocks turned to reveal the title one letter at a time.
- Created by: Freda Lingstrom & Maria Bird
- Voices of: 2002 version: Maria Darling; Jimmy Hibbert; Joanna Ruiz; David Holt
- Narrated by: Maria Bird (original version); Vera McKechnie (original and 1970 version); Tom Conti (2002 version)
- Opening theme: Andy Pandy Theme (2002)
- Ending theme: Andy Pandy Theme (instrumental; 2002)
- Country of origin: United Kingdom
- No. of series: 4
- No. of episodes: 91

Production
- Producers: David Boisseau; Peter Thompson
- Running time: 15–16 minutes (Watch with Mother); 5 minutes (2002 revival)
- Production companies: Original series; BBC; 2002 revival; Cosgrove Hall Films; BBC Worldwide; Ben Productions LLC

Original release
- Network: BBC Television Service/BBC1
- Release: 11 July 1950 – 30 March 1970
- Network: CBeebies
- Release: 25 March – 27 September 2002

Andy Pandy is a British children's television series that aired on BBC Television in 1950. Originally live, a series of 26 filmed programmes was shown until 1970, when a new series of 13 episodes was made. This series was the basis for a comic strip of the same name in the style of children's magazines Robin and Pippin.

The series was followed by a revival with 26 episodes (52 segments) in 2002. In total, 91 episodes were produced.

== Original 1950 and 1970 versions ==
The original version of Andy Pandy premiered on BBC TV in 1950, on 11 July as part of the For the Children strand (later Watch with Mother) narrated by Maria Bird who also narrated the black and white 1950s original broadcasts of Flower Pot Men, The Woodentops and Bizzy Lizzy. Initially it was broadcast live, but it was realised that if the programmes were filmed, they could be repeated. 26 fifteen-minute episodes were filmed on 16 mm around 1952 and repeated continuously until 1969. In 1970, 13 new episodes were made in colour with Vera McKechnie as narrator.

Andy, a marionette, was later joined by Teddy, a teddy bear, and Looby Loo, a rag doll, who came to life when Andy and Teddy were not around. Looby Loo sang "Here we go Looby Loo". All three lived in the same picnic basket. Each episode ended with a variation on the song: "Time to go home / Time to go home / Andy is waving goodbye."

It is said that the character's design was based on Paul Atterbury, the then young son of puppeteer Audrey Atterbury. A comic-strip version was published in Robin.

The production staff for the original series were:

- Producer: Freda Lingstrom.
- Old Narrator: Maria Bird and for the later 1970 remakes Vera McKechnie.
- New Narrator: Tom Conti.
  - Maria Darling as Andy Pandy and Missy Hissy
  - Jimmy Hibbert as Teddy
  - Joanna Ruiz as Looby Loo and Orbie
  - David Holt as Tiffo and Bilbo [1, 2]
- Writer/composer: Freda Lingstrom and Maria Bird.
- Singers: Gladys Whitred, Julia Williams and Maria Bird.
- Puppeteers: Audrey Atterbury, Molly Gibson, Martin Grainger, The Stavordales and Christopher Leith (in the 1970 colour series).

By 1970, as BBC1 was by then transmitted in colour, 13 new episodes were produced and shown from 5 January 1970.

The series was parodied by Des O'Connor in his Dandy Sandy sketches with Harry Secombe and Britt Ekland.

== 2002 revival ==
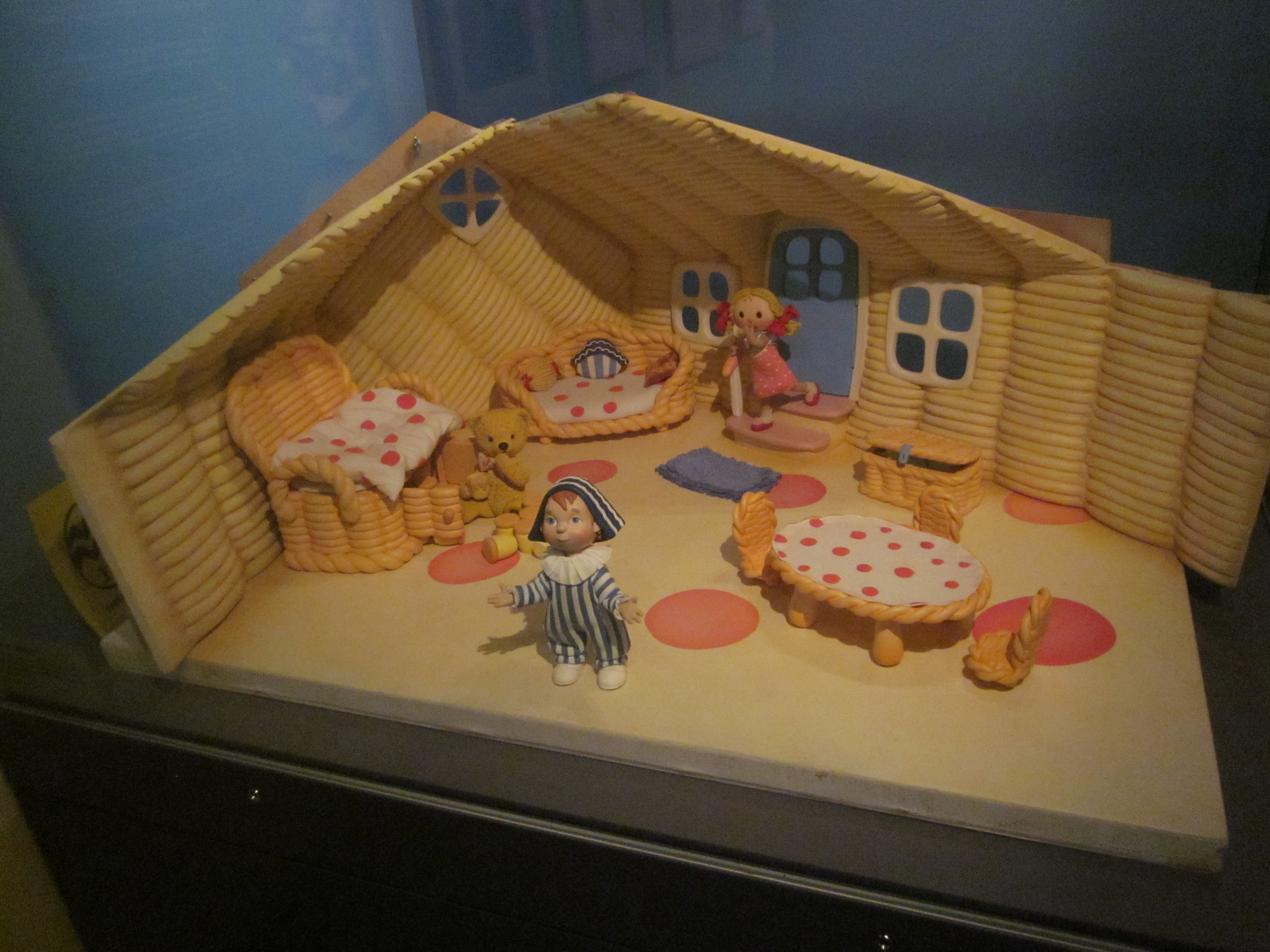
Stop motion set from the revival series on display at the National Science and Media Museum, with Andy Pandy, Looby Loo and Teddy

In 2002, BBC produced a revival of 52 episodes with the use of stop-motion animation instead of string puppets: the original nursery and garden were expanded to an entire village, with Andy (now voiced by Maria Darling), Teddy (now voiced by Jimmy Hibbert) and Looby Loo (now voiced by Joanna Ruiz) now owning individual houses, as well as four new characters that were introduced in the series: Missy Hissy (voiced by Maria Darling), a red-and-yellow snake; Tiffo, a teal-and-purple dog (vocals performed by David Holt); Bilbo (also voiced by David Holt), a sailor; and Orbie (vocals performed by Joanna Ruiz), a yellow-and-blue ball. Tom Conti narrated the new series.

Where the emphasis of the original series was on music and movement, the emphasis of the 2002 series was on making and doing. The series was animated and produced by Cosgrove Hall Films and Ben Productions (the latter also producing the 2001 remake of Bill and Ben aka Flower Pot Men).

== Episodes from the original series ==
=== Series 1 (1950) ===
No. overall	No. in season	Title	Original release date
1	1	"Tea Party"	1950
2	2	"Presents"	1950
3	3	"Music"	1950
4	4	"Hand Bells"	1950
5	5	"ABC"	1950
6	6	"Bricks"	1950
7	7	"Playing School"	1950
8	8	"Play Shops"	1950
9	9	"Leaning House"	1950
10	10	"Pram"	1950
11	11	"Farm"	1950
12	12	"Garden"	1950
13	13	"Wall and Tortoise"	1950
14	14	"Turtles"	1950
15	15	"Boats"	1950
16	16	"Paddling Pool"	1950
17	17	"Horse and Fish"	1950
18	18	"Bird and Butterfly"	1950
19	19	"Rabbits"	1950
20	20	"Kittens"	1950
21	21	"Kings and Queens"	1950
22	22	"Jack in the Box"	1950
23	23	"The Cart"	1950
24	24	"Swing"	1950
25	25	"Train Station"	1950
26	26	"Airport"	1950

=== Series 2 (1970) ===
No. overall	No. in season	Title	Original release date
27	1	"Andy Pandy's House"	5 January 1970
28	2	"Hobby Horses"	12 January 1970
29	3	"Scooters"	19 January 1970
30	4	"Trampoline"	26 January 1970
31	5	"Jack-in-the-Box"	2 February 1970
32	6	"A Wall and a Hedgehog"	9 February 1970
33	7	"Cleaning the House"	16 February 1970
34	8	"Tricycle"	23 February 1970
35	9	"Looby Loo Has a Cold"	2 March 1970
36	10	"The Jeep"	9 March 1970
37	11	"Tea Party"	16 March 1970
38	12	"Red Engine"	23 March 1970
39	13	"Sailing Boats"	30 March 1970

== Episodes from the revival series ==
This is a list of episodes in each series with songs every two episodes (if any):

=== Series 1 ===
No. overall	No. in season	Title	Written by	Song	Original release date
1	1	"Hide and Seek"	Chris Allen	Hopscotch	25 March 2002
Teddy gets lost during a game of hide and seek.
2	2	"The Balloon"	Jimmy Hibbert	Hopscotch	26 March 2002
Andy Pandy's balloon gets blown away.
3	3	"The Puddle"	Chris Allen	Honey	27 March 2002
Andy Pandy and Looby Loo make a boat and sail it on a puddle of rain water.
4	4	"The Picnic"	Jimmy Hibbert	Honey	28 March 2002
There is great excitement in the garden when Looby Loo plans a picnic. When Teddy manages to break her plates, Andy Pandy has a solution.
5	5	"The Man from the Moon"	Chris Allen	Musical Chairs	29 March 2002
Teddy gets stuck in a cardboard box and Andy Pandy mistakes him for a visitor from the Moon.
6	6	"Andy Pandy's Band"	Jimmy Hibbert	Musical Chairs	30 March 2002
Andy Pandy makes musical instruments out of odds and ends, so that Looby Loo can dance the day away.
7	7	"Tiffo and His Stick"	Chris Allen	Painting	31 March 2002
Andy Pandy and his friends decide to spring-clean their houses.
8	8	"A Lick of Paint"	Jimmy Hibbert	Painting	1 April 2002
Teddy tramples on Looby Loo's favourite blue flowers, so he makes decoy flowers with tissue paper, twigs and blue paint.
9	9	"A Flying Feather"	Chris Allen	Boxes	2 April 2002
Andy Pandy has a pretty present for Looby Loo, but it keeps blowing away.
10	10	"Puppeteer Pandy"	Jimmy Hibbert	Boxes	3 April 2002
Andy Pandy makes a puppet from an old sock, and tries to convince Missy Hissy that she has a new friend.
11	11	"The Birthday Cake"	Chris Allen	Gardening	4 April 2002
Andy Pandy thinks it is Looby Loo's birthday, so he tries to make an ice-cream cake.
12	12	"A String in the Tail"	Jimmy Hibbert	Gardening	5 April 2002
While Andy Pandy is wrapping a parcel, he loses his grip on a ball of string.
13	13	"Andy Pandy's Musical Box"	Chris Allen	Looby Loo	6 April 2002
Andy Pandy finds a musical box and Looby Loo teaches him how to dance.
14	14	"The Big Spring Clean"	Jimmy Hibbert	Looby Loo	7 April 2002
Andy Pandy and Teddy help Looby Loo with the spring cleaning, but Teddy ruins a portrait of Looby Loo. Luckily, Andy Pandy is at hand to show him how to make a collage.
15	15	"The Bubble"	Chris Allen	Playground	8 April 2002
Andy Pandy blows a bubble that follows him everywhere.
16	16	"Teddy Gets the Wind Up"	Jimmy Hibbert	Playground	9 April 2002
Teddy is helping Looby Loo put out the washing when a sheet blows away.
17	17	"A Noisy Supper"	Chris Allen	Tickle	10 April 2002
Andy Pandy, Looby Loo, and Teddy invite their friends to a very odd meal.
18	18	"Potato Prints"	Jimmy Hibbert	Tickle	11 April 2002
Andy Pandy brightens up Missy Hissy's pipes.
19	19	"Teddy's Sunglasses"	Chris Allen	Camping	12 April 2002
Teddy tries to make a pair of sunglasses.
20	20	"Growing Pains"	Jimmy Hibbert	Camping	13 April 2002
Andy shows Teddy how to make cress shapes and teaches his friend a lesson in patience.
21	21	"The Nest"	Chris Allen	Coming to Play (remake of the original opening theme)	14 April 2002
The gang tries to hatch some strange eggs they find in a nest.
22	22	"The Box That Chimed"	Chris Allen	Coming to Play (remake of the original opening theme)	15 April 2002
Andy Pandy hears the sound of chiming but can't work out how the noise is made.
23	23	"A Model Bear"	Jimmy Hibbert	Picnic	16 April 2002
After Tiffo destroys Teddy's plasticine mouse model, Andy Pandy makes modeling clay so that Teddy can create a model of his mentor.
24	24	"Hubble Bubble"	Jimmy Hibbert	Picnic	17 April 2002
While helping Looby Loo with the washing-up, Teddy discovers the joys of blowing bubbles.
25	25	"Bell Ringers"	Chris Allen	Tiffo	18 April 2002
Teddy makes a racket when Andy Pandy finds a bell.
26	26	"Rub-a-Dub"	Jimmy Hibbert	Tiffo	19 April 2002
Teddy is having a hard time of it painting a picture of his house. He is just about to give up when Andy suggests a novel way of getting his house drawn – with some paper and wax crayons.

=== Series 2 ===
No. overall	No. in season	Title	Written by	Song	Original release date
27	1	"Quick on the Straw"	Jimmy Hibbert	Say Hello	2 September 2002
Teddy is using a drinking straw to annoy Looby Loo.
28	2	"The Tent"	Chris Allen	Say Hello	3 September 2002
It is a hot night, so Andy Pandy and Teddy make a tent so they can sleep outside.
29	3	"Chocolate Eggstravaganza"	Jimmy Hibbert	Skittles	4 September 2002
Andy Pandy and Teddy make chocolate eggs, and then go on an egg hunt.
30	4	"The Big Sneeze"	Chris Allen	Skittles	5 September 2002
Andy Pandy has caught a cold and can't stop sneezing. He helps him feel better.
31	5	"Beetle Mania"	Jimmy Hibbert	Peek-a-Boo	6 September 2002
When Teddy is scared by a beetle, Andy Pandy helps him get over his fear by making beetle masks with him.
32	6	"The Noisy Ball"	Chris Allen	Peek-a-Boo	7 September 2002
Andy Pandy and Teddy find a very unusual ball.
33	7	"Easy Beady"	Jimmy Hibbert	Andy's Cupboard	8 September 2002
When Teddy breaks Looby Loo's daisy chain, Andy Pandy shows him how to make colourful beads for a replacement necklace.
34	8	"Andy Pandy's Odd Ink"	Chris Allen	Andy's Cupboard	9 September 2002
Andy Pandy draws a picture with his new ink and is amazed when his work vanishes from the page.
35	9	"Teddy's Long Legs"	Jimmy Hibbert	Playing with Tiffo	10 September 2002
When Tiffo and Teddy lose Tiffo's favourite snack in the branches of a tree, Andy Pandy shows Teddy how to make a pair of stilts to retrieve it.
36	10	"The Three Bears"	Chris Allen	Playing with Tiffo	11 September 2002
Teddy is frightened when he thinks he sees another bear trying to scare him away.
37	11	"Scaredy Bear"	Jimmy Hibbert	Racing	12 September 2002
When Andy Pandy and Looby Loo make a scarecrow, they don't expect it to scare Teddy – but it does!
38	12	"The Missing Whistle"	Chris Allen	Racing	13 September 2002
Teddy has been given a penny whistle as a present, but Tiffo thinks it's a long thin bone.
39	13	"A Tale of Two Spoons"	Jimmy Hibbert	Dressing Up	14 September 2002
Teddy is making a nuisance of himself with two wooden spoons, so Andy Pandy shows him how to make them into wooden puppets.
40	14	"Tiffo Gets a Car"	Chris Allen	Dressing Up	15 September 2002
When Tiffo's paw is stung by a wasp, Andy Pandy and Teddy make a cart for him so that they can still take him for walks on wheels!
41	15	"Blowing in the Wind"	Jimmy Hibbert	Mud Pies	16 September 2002
When Bilbo finds a box of bolts, Andy Pandy has the novel idea of using them to make a musical wind chime.
42	16	"The Old Sea Chest"	Jimmy Hibbert	Mud Pies	17 September 2002
When Andy Pandy finds that Bilbo's old sea-chest is full of sand, he has a seaside holiday on his very own beach.
43	17	"Cereal Number"	Jimmy Hibbert	Kites	18 September 2002
When Teddy spills some of his cereal, Andy Pandy shows him how to make a collage with it.
44	18	"Birdsong"	Chris Allen	Kites	19 September 2002
Andy Pandy wants to hear the dawn chorus but finds it hard to wake up on time.
45	19	"Get Your Skates On"	Jimmy Hibbert	Keeping Fit	20 September 2002
Teddy gets a present of a pair of roller skates, so he challenges Andy Pandy and Looby Loo to a race.
46	20	"Cheer Up Andy"	Jimmy Hibbert	Keeping Fit	21 September 2002
When Andy Pandy peels a large onion, he and his friends cannot stop crying.
47	21	"Orbie's Game"	Jimmy Hibbert	Pass the Parcel	22 September 2002
Orbie is sad because, being a ball, he can't join in with his friends' games, until Andy pandy makes him some ninepins to knock over.
48	22	"Hiccups"	Chris Allen	Pass the Parcel	23 September 2002
Andy Pandy has trouble giving Looby Loo a secret present when Teddy has hiccups.
49	23	"Teddy's Treasure Hunt"	Jimmy Hibbert	Let's Have a Party	24 September 2002
Andy Pandy devises a treasure hunt to keep Teddy amused.
50	24	"A Puzzle for Andy Pandy"	Chris Allen	Let's Have a Party	25 September 2002
Andy Pandy and Looby Loo make a picture from a jigsaw puzzle, but they can't figure out why there is a hole in the middle.
51	25	"Under the Spreading Newspaper Tree"	Jimmy Hibbert	Making a Noise	26 September 2002
When Teddy gets impatient waiting for his avocado plant to grow, Andy Pandy helps him to make some paper trees.
52	26	"Market Day"	Chris Allen	Making a Noise	27 September 2002
When Bilbo tells Andy Pandy and his friends about the outdoor markets he has visited, they decide to set up a market of their own. What will it see, and will they succeed?

== UK VHS and DVD releases ==
The original 1950s and the 1970s series have seen some VHS releases through BBC Enterprises.

Several VHS and DVD releases of the revival series were released by BBC Worldwide. In April 2008, Ben Productions LLC and Bulldog Licensing appointed 2 Entertain as home video distributor as part of a merchandise-led relaunch.

VHS or DVD title	Release date	Episodes
Andy Pandy (BBCV 4205)	5 December 1988	"Red Engine", "Sailing Boats", "Trampoline", "Hobby Horses"
Andy Pandy 2: Tales from the Toybox (BBCV 4361)	4 June 1990	"Jack in a Box", "Looby Loo Has a Cold", "Tea Party", "Tricycle"
The Very Best of Andy Pandy (BBCV 5110)	6 September 1993	"Trampoline", "Jack in a Box", "Red Engine", "Tea Party", "Hobby Horses"
Andy Pandy: Meet Andy Pandy and His Friends (BBCV 7341)	30 September 2002	"The Balloon", "The Man from the Moon", "Andy Pandy's Band", "A Flying Feather", "The Birthday Cake", "A String in the Tail", "The Bubble", "Teddy Gets the Wind Up", "A Noisy Supper", "The Box That Chimed"
Andy Pandy: Charming Stories (BBCV 7399)	21 April 2003	"Hide and Seek", "Tiffo and His Stick", "A Lick of Paint", "Puppeteer Pandy", "Andy Pandy's Musical Box", "The Big Spring Clean", "Teddy's Sunglasses", "The Nest", "Hubble Bubble", "Bell Ringers"
Andy Pandy: Teddy's Sunglasses and Other Stories	2006	"Bell Ringers", "The Bubble", "The Nest", "Teddy's Sunglasses", "The Big Spring Clean", "A Lick of Paint"
Andy Pandy: Hide and Seek	8 September 2008	"Hide and Seek", "Song: Hopscotch", "The Balloon", "The Puddle", "Song: Honey", "The Picnic", "The Man from the Moon", "Song: Musical Chairs", "Andy Pandy's Band", "Tiffo and His Stick", "Song: Painting", "A Lick of Paint", "A Flying Feather", "Song: Boxes", "Puppeteer Pandy"
Andy Pandy: The Birthday Cake	8 September 2008	"The Birthday Cake", "Song: Gardening", "A String in the Tale", "Andy Pandy's Musical Box", "Song: Looby Loo", "The Big Spring Clean", "The Bubble", "Song: Playground", "Teddy Gets the Wind Up", "A Noisy Supper", "Song: Tickle", "Potato Prints", "Teddy's Sunglasses", "Song: Camping", "Growing Pains"

== Credits ==
- you can find Andy Pandy at BBC Online.
- 2002 animated version @ BBC Programmes
- "Andy Pandy (1950)". BFI Screenonline. Archived from the original on 2 August 2016.
- Andy Pandy at IMDb
