= Lime Grove Studios =

Former film studios located in London

- Lime Grove Studios in the 1960s

- Location within Greater London Location within London Borough of Hammersmith and Fulham
- Former names: Gaumont Film Studios

General information
- Status: Demolished
- Type: Film and television studio
- Architectural style: Art Deco
- Location: Lime Grove, Shepherd's Bush, London, United Kingdom
- Coordinates: 51°30′13″N 0°13′38″W
- Completed: 1915
- Opened: 1915 Opened as Gaumont Studios; 1949 converted to TV studio
- Demolished: 1993
- Owner: Gaumont (1915–1949); BBC (1949–1991)

Lime Grove Studios was a film, and later television, studio complex in Shepherd's Bush, west London, England.

The complex was built by Gaumont in 1915. It was situated in Lime Grove, a residential street in Shepherd's Bush, and when it first opened was described by Gaumont as "the finest studio in Great Britain and the first building ever put up in this country solely for the production of films". Many Gainsborough Pictures films were made here from the early 1930s. Its sister studio was Islington Studios, also used by Gainsborough; films were often shot partly at Islington and partly at Lime Grove.

In 1949, the complex was purchased by the BBC, who used it for television broadcasts until 1991. It was demolished in 1993.

== Gaumont-British Picture Corporation ==
In 1922, Isidore Ostrer along with brothers Mark and Maurice, acquired control of Gaumont-British from its French parent. In 1932 a major redevelopment of Lime Grove Studios was completed, creating one of the best equipped sound studio complexes of that era. The first film produced at the remodelled studio was the Walter Forde thriller Rome Express (1932), which became one of the first British sound films to gain critical and financial success in the United States (where it was distributed by Universal Pictures).

The studios prospered under Gaumont-British, and in 1941 were bought by the Rank Organisation. By then Rank had a substantial interest in Gainsborough Pictures, and The Wicked Lady (1945), among other Gainsborough melodramas, was shot at Lime Grove.

== BBC studios ==
In 1949 the BBC bought Lime Grove Studios as a "temporary measure" – because they were to build Television Centre at nearby White City – and began converting them from film to television use. The BBC studios were ceremonially opened on 21 May 1950 by Violet Attlee (wife of the then prime minister Clement Attlee).

Lime Grove would be used for many BBC Television programmes over the next forty-two years, including: Quatermass II; Andy Pandy; The Sky at Night; The Diary of Samuel Pepys; Dixon of Dock Green; Nineteen Eighty-Four; Steptoe and Son; Doctor Who; Nationwide; Panorama; Blue Peter and The Grove Family, which took its title family from the studios, where it was made. A children's magazine-style programme, Studio E, was broadcast live from the studio of the same name from 1955 until 1958; it was hosted by Vera McKechnie.

The Queen and Prince Philip visited Lime Grove on 28 October 1953, when they observed production of the variety show For Your Pleasure, the quiz show Animal, Vegetable, Mineral?, and a drama production, The Disagreeable Man.

On 20 January 1966, the first edition of Top of the Pops from Lime Grove was broadcast, hosted by David Jacobs. The newly successful show had moved south from its original home at Dickenson Road Studios, a converted church building in Manchester, to the larger studio facilities at Lime Grove, where the production could attract a more trendy "Swinging London" studio audience. Top of the Pops was produced at Lime Grove for three years until the show moved to BBC Television Centre in 1969.

Lime Grove hosted a revolution in British TV when Breakfast Time began broadcasting from there on 17 January 1983, the start of popular daytime television, hosted by Frank Bough, Selina Scott and Nick Ross.

Lime Grove's use for programmes outside current affairs declined over time, and later episodes of the continuing series were made at BBC Television Centre and BBC Elstree Centre. Indeed, in Lime Grove Studios' final years, its official name was Lime Grove Current Affairs Production Centre.

In 1991, the BBC decided to consolidate its London television production at the nearby BBC Television Centre and to close its other studios including Lime Grove. The last live programme to be broadcast from Lime Grove was The Late Show on 13 June 1991 from Studio D, although the final portion of the programme, with a symbolic "unplugging" of a camera power cord in Studio D by Cliff Michelmore, was pre-recorded.

On 26 August 1991, a month after the studios were closed, the BBC transmitted a special day of programming called The Lime Grove Story, featuring examples of the many programmes and films that had been made at Lime Grove in its 76 years as a place of film and television production. BBC Television Theatre close by, near Shepherd's Bush Green, reverted to being the Shepherd's Bush Empire.

By the end, the building was in such a poor state of repair that the remaining BBC staff nicknamed it "Slime Grove". The building was put on the market and eventually bought by a development company, Notting Hill Housing Association, which demolished the studios in 1993, and redeveloped the site into a housing estate. The streets in the estate were named Gaumont Terrace and Gainsborough Court, in memory of the past owners of Lime Grove Studios.

== In popular culture ==
Lime Grove Studios was the setting for the fictional current affairs programme The Hour in the BBC drama of the same name. The studios are also represented in the 2013 drama An Adventure in Space and Time, which was shot at Wimbledon Studios.

== See also ==
- Gaumont
- Gainsborough Pictures
- List of Gainsborough Pictures films
- Urania Cottage
