= All Your Own =

Television series

All Your Own was a BBC children's television programme broadcast from 1952 until 1961. The show provided the first television appearances for Jimmy Page, John Williams and the King Brothers.

Commissioned by Freda Lingstrom and produced by Cliff Michelmore, the show featured children demonstrating their talents or showing off their collections. The programme was presented by Huw Wheldon until 1960. Other presenters included Brian Johnston. The opening music was the first movement of Mendelssohn's Italian Symphony.
