= Robin (magazine) =

British children's magazine published from 1953 to 1969

Publication information
- Publisher: Hulton Press (1953–1960); Odhams Press (1960–1963); IPC (1963–1969)
- Schedule: Weekly
- Format: Ongoing series
- Genre: Children's
- Publication date: 1953 – 1969
- No. of issues: 836

Creative team
- Artist(s): Reg Foster, Basil Reynolds, Sabine Schweitzer, Jennetta Vise, Robert Williams
- Editor(s): Marcus Morris (1960–1962); Clifford Makins (from 1962)

Robin was a British weekly children's magazine published from 1953 to 1969, originally by Hulton Press. Robin was billed as "companion to Eagle, Girl, and Swift" and aimed at younger readers and pre-readers.

Both the weeklies and annuals were originally edited by Marcus Morris, but by 1962 Clifford Makins had become editor. Artists who worked on Robin included Sabine Schweitzer, Jennetta Vise, Basil Reynolds, Reg Foster, and Robert Williams.

== Publication history ==
In 1959–1960, Odhams Press acquired Hulton Press, renaming it Longacre Press, (Note: Odhams' headquarters were at 64 Long Acre, London, inspiring the new name.) thus taking over publication of Eagle, Girl, Swift, and Robin.

In 1960 Cecil Harmsworth King, chairman of the Daily Mirror newspaper, made an approach to Odhams on behalf of Fleetway Publications (formerly the Amalgamated Press). Odhams' board found this too attractive to refuse and, in 1961, Odhams was taken over by Fleetway. In 1963 its holdings were amalgamated with those of the George Newnes Ltd, Fleetway, and others, to form the International Publishing Corporation (known as IPC). Between 1964 and 1968 Odhams operated as a subsidiary of IPC.

Associated annuals were also produced, the first dated 1954, until at least the ninth in 1962. In 1969 Robin was merged into Playhour.

== Content ==
In addition to comic strips, other features included games and puzzles, stories in prose both fictional and true life, poems, colouring-in, and craft projects.

The magazine also had a "Robin Birthday Club" which the reader could join, with a card featuring a robin and the child's name and enrolment number.

== Strips ==
- Andy Pandy, based on the BBC television series.
- Harriet and Smith, about a girl Harriet and her cat Smith
- Johnny Bull
- Flower Pot Men, based on the BBC television series.
- Midge the Little Motor-Car
- Princess Tai-Lu, about a Siamese cat able to do magic, and her friends Gwladys, Ivor, Mr. Tonkins and Jed.
- Richard Lion, which followed the adventures of Richard and his friends Henry the kangaroo, Pug the bulldog, Peggy the black panther, Nemo the jester and others.
- The twins Simon and Sally
- Bizzy Beaver, which followed the adventures of Bizzy and his friends Ricky Racoon and Boo Bear, and also the Beaver family, Mr. & Mrs. Beaver and Bizzy's little brother, Baby Beaver
- Nutty Noddle, a squirrel whose best friend was Oswald Owl; also his Aunt Scofalot sometimes featured, a lady who loved eating and always wore a tea cosy as a hat with the full teapot beneath, ready for whenever she fancied a cuppa
- Tom the Tractor
- Tubby the Odd-job Engine, the adventures of a little tank engine and his slightly eccentric, bearded driver Mr. Pickles.
- The Story of Woppit, which followed the adventures of a bear-like creature Woppit and his friends Tiptop the scarecrow, Mokey the donkey and Mrs. Bumble. The Woppit character was produced as a bear by Merrythought. One of these bears, Mr Whoppit, became the mascot of land and water speed record-breaker Donald Campbell.

== Sources ==
- Robin at the Grand Comics Database
