= Henry Dodd =

William Henry Dodd (died 1881), "The Golden Dustman", raised the status of Thames bargemen, and aimed to improve the performance of the Thames sailing barges.

1863, 1864 and 1865 saw the first Thames barge races. These continued unbroken until 1938. There were two classes, one for stumpies (under 80 tons) and one for heavier (under 100 tons) topsail barges. They were fiercely competitive – and soon new barges were being built, using the improved techniques learnt, just to win the next year's race. The Medway races started in 1880.

They were begun in 1863 by a wealthy owner called Henry Dodd. Dodd was a ploughboy from Hackney, London, who made his fortune carrying the city's waste to the country on the barges. He may well have been the model for Charles Dickens's character the Golden Dustman in Our Mutual Friend. On his death in 1881, Dodd left £5000 for future match prizes.
