= Rag, Tag and Bobtail =

- Created by: Freda Lingstrom; David Boisseau
- No. of episodes: 26 (2 unaired)

Production
- Running time: 12 minutes
- Production company: BBC

Original release
- Network: BBC Television Service
- Release: 10 September 1953 – 18 February 1954

Rag, Tag and Bobtail is a BBC children's television programme that ran from 1953 to 1965 as the Thursday programme in the weekly cycle of Watch with Mother. The scripts were written by Louise Cochrane, and the series was produced by Freda Lingstrom and David Boisseau. Narration was by Charles E. Stidwell, David Enders, and James Urquhart.

The three main characters are Rag, a hedgehog; Tag, a mouse; and Bobtail, a rabbit; five baby rabbits also appeared occasionally. All the characters are glove puppets, created and operated by Sam and Elizabeth Williams. The stories were simple and there were no catch-phrases as there were in other programmes in the cycle. Twenty-six 12-minute episodes were made, two of which were never broadcast, each shot in a single take.

The repeat showings came to an end in December 1965, replaced by Tales of the Riverbank (moved from its normal Monday slot by Camberwick Green).

In 1987, a Watch with Mother video was released by the BBC. The episode of Rag, Tag and Bobtail featured a scene in which Bobtail discovered that the baby rabbits had been playing in a muddy pool and had turned black. He was unable to clean them, but in the end the mud was washed off.
