= Maria Bird =

British television producer (1891–1979)

- Born: Maria Edith Bird; 24 August 1891; Pietermaritzburg, Colony of Natal
- Died: 25 August 1979 (aged 88); Westerham, Kent, England
- Occupation: Producer
- Notable work: Watch with Mother

Maria Edith Bird (pronounced Marie) (24 August 1891 – 25 August 1979) was a South African-born British producer.

She was born in Pietermaritzburg, Colony of Natal, and died in the village where she lived for most of her life, Westerham, aged 88.

She was a descendant of Francis Bird the sculptor and Colonel Christopher Bird who was Colonial Secretary at Cape Town Castle (where there is a landmark named after him in Kirstenbosch, South Africa – Colonel Bird's Bath). Her mother brought her children from Natal Colony to the UK to be educated and Maria attended a Scottish convent. Following school, she studied the Dalcroze eurhythmics music and dance method under Émile Jaques-Dalcroze in Dessau.

Maria Bird helped found BBC Children's Television with her close friend Freda Lingstrom with whom she set up Westerham Arts, the production company commissioned by the BBC to produce TV pieces including The Woodentops (1955), Flower Pot Men (1952) and Andy Pandy (1950). Westerham Arts was based in Chartwell Cottage (owned by Bird and Lingstrom and subsequently bequeathed to the National Trust). It neighbours the Chartwell Estate. Maria and Freda built a shed in their garden where their puppet films were made. In addition to TV production she was a writer, narrator and musician.
