= My Wife and I (TV series) =

1958 British television comedy series

- Country of origin: United Kingdom
- Original language: English
- No. of episodes: 11

Production
- Production company: Associated-Rediffusion

Original release
- Network: ITV
- Release: 1958 – 1958

My Wife and I is a British television comedy which aired on ITV in 1958. It was produced by Associated-Rediffusion Television. It starred Mai Zetterling, Rex Garner and Joan Benham.

All 11 episodes are believed to lost.
