= Audrey Atterbury =

British puppeteer (1921–1997)

Audrey Atterbury in the 1960s

Audrey Selma Atterbury (19 April 1921 – 8 April 1997) was a British puppeteer best known for her work on the 1950s pioneering BBC children's series Andy Pandy.

== Biography ==
Born in London in 1921 as Audrey Holman, during World War II she worked for an average adjusters firm in London. She married Rowley Atterbury in 1943, and had one child, Paul Atterbury, who went on to become an antiques expert and a regular on the BBC's Antiques Roadshow. In about 1949 Rowley Atterbury founded the Westerham Press, and Audrey worked with her husband in the printing business.

During a train journey in 1950, Audrey met Freda Lingstrom, the newly appointed head of BBC Children's Television. After striking up a conversation and establishing common interests, Lingstrom persuaded Atterbury to become a puppeteer on a new television series, to be called Andy Pandy (1950–52). It is claimed that Lingstrom based the appearance of Andy Pandy on the young Paul Atterbury. Audrey Atterbury trained under John Wright, later the founder of the Little Angel Theatre in Islington, North London.

Atterbury continued to work as a puppeteer in such series as Flower Pot Men (1952–54), and The Woodentops (1955–58). In around 1956, after separating from her husband, Audrey Atterbury went to live in Highgate in London, near to her fellow BBC puppeteer, Molly Gibson, who was a close friend. The two worked together on Rubovian Legends and other Gordon Murray puppet plays. Atterbury also worked for the Little Angel Theatre, by then one of Britain’s leading puppet theatres. Atterbury worked on the puppet series The Telegoons (1963–64), which was based on Spike Milligan's radio show The Goon Show.

In the 1960s, television puppets started to be replaced by animation, which led Atterbury to leave the BBC to take up a career in antiques, specialising in pottery and porcelain. She became a part-time antiques dealer, at the same time building up a large personal collection of ceramics. Later, Atterbury worked for a number of antique dealers and in 1987 she joined Christie's, becoming the longest serving and most respected member of the team of lady saleroom assistants. She was Secretary of the Morley College Ceramic Circle for about 18 years.

=== Death ===
After her divorce, Atterbury did not remarry and lived in South London from about 1962 until she died in 1997 aged 75. On her death her collection of ceramics, including rare examples by Royal Doulton and Moorcroft, was sold at auction by Christie's.
