= Bill and Ben (TV series) =

British children's television series

- Based on: Flower Pot Men by Freda Lingstrom
- Starring: John Thomson; Jimmy Hibbert; Eve Karpf
- Narrated by: John Thomson
- Opening theme: "Bill and Ben Theme"
- Ending theme: "Bill and Ben Theme" (different version)
- Country of origin: United Kingdom
- Original language: English
- No. of series: 2
- No. of episodes: 52

Production
- Executive producers: Theresa Plummer-Andrews; Neil Benedict
- Producer: Francis Vose
- Running time: 10 minutes
- Production companies: Cosgrove Hall Films; BBC Worldwide; Ben Productions LLC

Original release
- Network: BBC One
- Release: 4 January – 3 May 2001
- Network: BBC Two
- Release: 7 September 2001 – 10 December 2002

Bill and Ben is a British stop-motion animated television series produced by Cosgrove Hall Films for BBC Worldwide. It is a remake of the 1952 TV series Flower Pot Men aimed at young children. Production began in 2000, and it aired for two series between 4 January 2001 and 10 December 2002.

== Broadcast ==
On January 4, 2001, a new series in colour named Bill and Ben began on Children's BBC on BBC One, this time involving stop-motion animation, 35mm film style and full colour, and made by Cosgrove Hall Films with a team of ten animators. This show features the voices of John Thomson (who also serves as the narrator), Jimmy Hibbert, and Eve Karpf. The TV series aired in the Republic of Ireland on RTÉjr and formerly aired on CBeebies from February 11, 2002 to the afternoon of August 29, 2008.

== Difference between versions ==
Many additions were implemented:

- A mean female rosebush with two talking buds in the neighbour's garden named Rose.
- A mischievous female prickly plant named Thistle.
- A female magpie named Pry, obsessed by shiny treasure, often just every bottle cap.
- A male hedgehog named Boo.
- Slowcoach the Tortoise remains in the series, with few changes to his characteristics. He gets angry at Bill & Ben for ruining his things, but mostly, for messing around.
- A male frog named Tad.
- A female squirrel named Scamper.
- A male baby squirrel named Scuff. He is Scamper's baby nephew.
- A female spider named Whimsy.
- A male earthworm named Whoops.
- A male talking tomato named Ketchup.
- Another male tortoise called Lightning. He is Slowcoach's brother.
- Bill and Ben's voice tones have switched; Bill now has the deep-toned voice, while Ben now has the high-toned voice.
- Weed no longer just says her name; she speaks conventional English, playing an "earth mother" role to Bill and Ben and often assisting them.

== Episodes ==
Episodes within each series are listed in order of first UK broadcast, according to Radio Times. The last three episodes of the first series, which featured snow, were delayed until Christmas and were therefore broadcast out-of-sequence between episodes 11 and 12 of the second series.

Series	Episodes		Originally released		
Series	Episodes		First released	Last released	Network
1	26	18	4 January 2001	3 May 2001	BBC One
1	26	8	7 September 2001	3 January 2002	BBC Two
2	26	11	8 October 2001	21 December 2001	BBC Two
2	26	15	3 September 2002	10 December 2002	BBC Two

=== Series 1 (2001–2002) ===
==== BBC One (CBBC strand) ====
No. overall	No. in season	Title	Written by	Original release date
1	1	"The Tortoise and the Pots"	Jimmy Hibbert	4 January 2001
Bill and Ben challenge Slowcoach the tortoise to a nut-gathering contest.
2	2	"Go Fly a Kite"	Jimmy Hibbert	11 January 2001
Pry has lost her favourite treasure, a milk bottle top. Bill and Ben try to find it but end up stuck in a rubbish dump. How will they get home?
3	3	"A Piece of Sky"	Jimmy Hibbert	18 January 2001
Bill and Ben look for something to cheer up Weed's part of the garden. They think a piece of sky might be just the thing. But the piece they find in the garden doesn't appear to be sky at all.
4	4	"The Hottest Day"	Chris Allen	25 January 2001
Bill and Ben look for something to protect Weed from the sun.
5	5	"Litterhog"	Chris Allen	1 February 2001
When Bill and Ben wake up to find the garden full of litter, Weed suggests a competition to see who can clear up the most mess.
6	6	"Sticky Problems"	Jimmy Hibbert	8 February 2001
Bill and Ben find something very useful, but it turns out to be a hindrance than a help.
7	7	"In Search of Lettuce"	Pete Reeves	15 February 2001
While Bill and Ben search the garden for some lettuce for Slowcoach, Thistle seizes the chance to play a trick on them.
8	8	"The Big Time Band"	Jimmy Hibbert	22 February 2001
Weed is unhappy, so Bill and Ben try to cheer her up. Nothing seems to work – until they find inspiration in Whimsy the spider's web.
9	9	"One of Our Spiders is Missing"	Jimmy Hibbert	1 March 2001
When Whimsy gets a fright and runs away, Bill and Ben set off a mission to find her. But what are the strange noises preventing her from returning?
10	10	"Here Comes the Sun"	Chris Allen	8 March 2001
Confusion reigns in the garden when the sun keeps coming out for short periods during the night.
11	11	"Phwoooar"	Jimmy Hibbert	15 March 2001
Bill and Ben are looking for the source of a horrible smell.
12	12	"Around and Around"	Chris Allen	22 March 2001
Bill and Ben have fun with a strange round object they find in the garden, but Pry and Scamper can't see the funny side.
13	13	"The Big Sleep"	Jimmy Hibbert	29 March 2001
Boo the hedgehog settles down for Winter, so Bill and Ben try to keep the garden as quiet as possible.
14	14	"Ben Has a Visitor"	Chris Allen	5 April 2001
Returning home one evening, Ben finds that something has taken the root in his pot. Slowcoach celebrates his birthday - over 3 days.
15	15	"A Night to Remember"	Jimmy Hibbert	12 April 2001
Slowcoach has an uninvited guest - a spectacle thief! So that night, Bill and Ben try searching for the missing spectacles.
16	16	"A Picture for Slowcoach"	Chris Allen	19 April 2001
One morning, something interesting blows into the garden, but Bill and Ben misplace it and start searching for it. Will they find it before Slowcoach realises it's missing?
17	17	"Treasure Garden"	Jimmy Hibbert	26 April 2001
Weed suggests a game of treasure hunt, leading Bill and Ben to find something they're not too familiar with.
18	18	"The Jumping Jar"	Chris Allen	3 May 2001
Tad, next door's friendly frog, gets himself into a very sticky situation. Bill and Ben hop to it and uncover the mystery.

==== BBC Two (CBBC strand) ====
No. overall	No. in season	Title	Written by	Original release date
19	19	"The Great Worm Hunt"	Jimmy Hibbert	7 September 2001
Bill and Ben are having fun with the garden hose, when they notice that Whoops the worm is missing.
20	20	"The Singing Cobwebs"	Chris Allen	14 September 2001
Bill and Ben awake to discover that Whimsy the spider has spun beautiful new webs all around the garden.
21	21	"Game for a Laugh"	Jimmy Hibbert	21 September 2001
Bill and Ben enjoy playing a new game they have invented, until things mysteriously disappear.
22	22	"Tears Before Bedtime"	Chris Allen	28 September 2001
Bill and Ben set out to discover the true identity of an object that Scamper believes to be a big nut.
23	23	"Weed Sees the World"	Chris Allen	5 October 2001
Weed discovers there's more to life than the garden, and wants to travel the world. Knowing that it's not possible, Bill and Ben try to bring the world to her.
24	24	"The Shiny Man"	Chris Allen	28 December 2001
Bill and Ben make something out of snow to give to Weed.
25	25	"The Snow Castle"	Chris Allen	1 January 2002
Bill and Ben make a snow castle in the garden, but when they wake up the next day, the castle is not quite how they remembered it.
26	26	"Two New Flowerpot Men"	Chris Allen	3 January 2002
When Tad learns there's another frog living in next door's pond, so Bill and Ben investigate, and discover it's not the only inhabitant there.

=== Series 2 (2001–2002) ===
==== BBC Two (CBBC strand) ====
No. overall	No. in season	Title	Written by	Original release date
27	1	"All Quiet on the Flowerpot Front"	Jimmy Hibbert	8 October 2001
Slowcoach is fed up with the noise the Flowerpot Men make, so Weed invents the Keeping Quiet and Still game for them to play. Unfortunately, they aren't very good at it.
28	2	"Looking After Ben"	Chris Allen	19 October 2001
Ben stays up late to see the new moon and catches a nasty cold. Bill does his best to care for him.
29	3	"Slowcoach's Brother"	Jimmy Hibbert	26 October 2001
Slowcoach's brother Lightning comes to stay, but proves to be an unwelcome guest. It's up to Bill, Ben, Whimsy and a magnifying glass to get rid of him.
30	4	"Meeting Lulu"	Chris Allen	2 November 2001
The arrival of a pretty doll causes trouble for Bill and Ben as they compete for her affections.
31	5	"Two Angry Men"	Jimmy Hibbert	9 November 2001
Bill and Ben fall out with one another while playing Hunt the Carrot.
32	6	"The Rainbow"	Chris Allen	16 November 2001
Bill and Ben try to catch a rainbow - but it is not easy as it first appears.
33	7	"Whoops Takes a Trip"	Chris Allen	23 November 2001
A remote-control car appears in the garden, and Bill and Ben decide to give Whoops the ride of a lifetime.
34	8	"Tin Can Telephones"	Chris Allen	30 November 2001
Bill and Ben learn how to make a telephone with tin cans and string, and use it to rescue Boo.
35	9	"The Magnet"	Jimmy Hibbert	7 December 2001
Bill and Ben find a magnet, which helps them to find Slowcoach's lost spectacles.
36	10	"Home Sweet Home"	Chris Allen	14 December 2001
Tad, the frog next door, moves in and soon tires Bill and Ben out.
37	11	"Down in the Cellar"	Jimmy Hibbert	21 December 2001
While playing hide and seek, Ben discovers the cellar.

==== BBC Two (CBeebies strand) ====
No. overall	No. in season	Title	Written by	Original release date
38	12	"A Gnome's Best Friend"	Chris Allen	20 March 2002
Bill and Ben befriend the lonely Garden Gnome who does not have any friends.
39	13	"Water Water Everywhere"	Jimmy Hibbert	21 March 2002
Bill and Ben save Rose from a garden sprinkler but things go wrong when they end up flooding Slowcoach's house.
40	14	"Balloon Tricks"	Chris Allen	22 March 2002
Tad has played a trick on Bill and Ben, so when they find a hot air balloon they play tricks and get their own back.
41	15	"Bubble Trouble"	Jimmy Hibbert	7 September 2002
Bill and Ben find a washing-up liquid bottle. Bill accidentally drinks some of the liquid causing him to have hiccups. They decide to mix the contents with water, and Whoops finds himself in deep bubble trouble!
42	16	"The Perfect Nut"	Chris Allen	8 September 2002
Bill and Ben find a new game to play and have great fun playing it. Unfortunately, they get so distracted that they forget they are supposed to be looking after Scamper's baby nephew.
43	17	"Flowerpot Band"	Jimmy Hibbert	8 October 2002
Bill and Ben hear many musical noises in the garden. When they put them all together, they make some wonderful music.
44	18	"Slowcoach Gets Cross"	Chris Allen	15 October 2002
Slowcoach is not impressed by the drawings made by Bill and Ben, and gets upset when they accidentally break his favourite picture.
45	19	"Every Cloud Has a Silly Lining"	Jimmy Hibbert	22 October 2002
Bill and Ben decide to make a cloud and Slowcoach discovers that the joke's on him when they make a thunderstorm too!
46	20	"Whimsy the Brave"	Chris Allen	29 October 2002
Bill and Ben go on a climbing adventure with Tad and they find that Tad is afraid of heights until Whimsy the spider comes to help him.
47	21	"Weed's Birthday"	Jimmy Hibbert	5 November 2002
Bill, Ben and their friends prepare a special birthday surprise for Weed.
48	22	"A Cellar Full of Noise"	Chris Allen	12 November 2002
When Bill and Ben search the garden for a wooden draught that's gone missing from their game, they hear strange sounds.
49	23	"Snow Place Like Home"	Jimmy Hibbert	19 November 2002
When Slowcoach tells Bill and Ben about igloos, they decide to make one for themselves – but they're no eskimos.
50	24	"Bouncing Cobwebs"	Chris Allen	26 November 2002
Bill and Ben make a sledge and find out how magical Whimsy's cobwebs can be.
51	25	"The Big Thaw"	Jimmy Hibbert	3 December 2002
Bill and Ben decide to have a game of football. But where's the ball? Thistle says she hasn't seen it, but when the snow thaws it's clear she lied.
52	26	"Winter Sports"	Chris Allen	10 December 2002
Bill, Ben and Tad take part in a sports contest in the snowy garden.

== UK VHS and DVD releases ==
Several VHS and DVD releases of the series were released by BBC Worldwide.

In April 2008, Ben Productions LLC and Bulldog Licensing appointed 2 Entertain as home video distributor as part of a merchandise-led relaunch.

VHS or DVD title	Release date	Episodes
Bill and Ben: Flobbadobba Fun! (BBCV 7141)	2 April 2001	"The Tortoise and the Pots"; "The Hottest Day"; "One of Our Spiders is Missing"; "Sticky Problems"; "Litterhog"
Bill and Ben: Garden Games (BBCV 7188)	17 September 2001	"Weed Sees The World"; "Phwoooar"; "Here Comes The Sun"; "Ben Has A Visitor"; "Treasure Garden"
Bill and Ben: Flowerpot Friends (BBCV 7313)	20 May 2002	"Around and Around"; "A Night To Remember"; "Game for a Laugh"; "The Great Worm Hunt"; "Two New Flowerpot Men"
Bill and Ben: Here Comes the Sun and Other Stories	2006	"Here Comes the Sun"; "Treasure Garden"; "Weed Sees the World"
Bill and Ben: Go Fly a Kite (2EDVD0431)	8 September 2008	"Go Fly a Kite"; "The Tortoise and the Pots"; "A Piece of Sky"; "The Hottest Day"; "Litterhog"; "Sticky Problems"
Bill and Ben: Here Comes the Sun (2EDVD0432)	8 September 2008	"Here Comes the Sun"; "In Search of Lettuce"; "The Big Time Band"; "One of Our Spiders is Missing"; "Phwoooar"; "Around and Around"
