= Our Mutual Friend (1958 serial) =

1958 British TV drama series

- Genre: Historical drama
- Based on: Our Mutual Friend by Charles Dickens
- Written by: Freda Lingstrom
- Directed by: Eric Tayler
- Starring: Paul Daneman; Zena Walker; David McCallum
- Country of origin: United Kingdom
- Original language: English
- No. of series: 1
- No. of episodes: 12

Production
- Producer: Douglas Allen
- Running time: 30 minutes
- Production company: BBC

Original release
- Network: BBC One
- Release: 7 November 1958 – 23 January 1959

Our Mutual Friend is a 1958 British TV adaptation from Charles Dickens' 1865 novel Our Mutual Friend. The series was made by the BBC and ran through 1959 for a total of twelve episodes, broadcast live and telerecorded for potential repeats. Unlike most BBC series of the 1950s, the series exists in its entirety, and in 2017 was released to DVD by Simply Media.

== Cast and characters ==
Actor/Actress	Role
Paul Daneman	John Rokesmith
Zena Walker	Miss Bella Wilfer
David McCallum	Eugene Wrayburn
Richard Leech	'Rogue' Riderhood
Richard Pearson	Nicodemus Boffin
Rachel Roberts	Lizzie Hexam
Basil Henson	Mortimer Lightwood
Marda Vanne	Mrs Henrietta Boffin
George Howe	Reginald Wilfer
Helena Hughes	Jenny Wren
Alex Scott	Bradley Headstone
Carl Bernard	Alfred Lammle
Rachel Gurney	Mrs Sophronia Lammle
Robert Scroggins	Sloppy
Charles Hodgson	Mr Fledgeby
Daphne Newton	Mrs Wilfer
Wilfrid Brambell	Mr Dolls
Melvyn Hayes	Charley Hexam
