= Our Mutual Friend =

1864–1865 novel by Charles Dickens

- Cover of serial No. 8, December 1864
- Author: Charles Dickens
- Cover artist: Marcus Stone
- Language: English
- Genre: Novel
- Publisher: Chapman & Hall
- Publication date: Serialised 1864–65; book form 1865
- Publication place: England
- Media type: Print
- Preceded by: Great Expectations
- Followed by: The Mystery of Edwin Drood
- Text: Our Mutual Friend at Wikisource

Our Mutual Friend, published in 1864–1865, is the fourteenth and final novel completed by English author Charles Dickens and is one of his most sophisticated works, combining savage satire with social analysis. It centres on, in the words of critic J. Hillis Miller, quoting the book's character Bella Wilfer, "money, money, money, and what money can make of life".

Most reviewers in the 1860s continued to praise Dickens's skill as a writer in general, but did not review this novel in detail. Some found the plot both too complex and not well laid out. The Times of London found the first few chapters did not draw the reader into the characters. In the 20th century, however, reviewers began to find much to approve in the later novels of Dickens, including Our Mutual Friend. In the late 20th and early 21st centuries, some reviewers suggested that Dickens was, in fact, experimenting with structure, and that the characters considered somewhat flat and not recognized by the contemporary reviewers were meant rather to be true representations of the Victorian working class and the key to understanding the structure of the society depicted by Dickens in the novel.

== Characters ==
=== Major characters ===
- John Harmon – is heir to the Harmon estate, under the condition that he marry Bella Wilfer. He is presumed dead throughout most of the novel, though he is living under the name John Rokesmith, and working as a secretary for the Boffins in an attempt to better get to know Bella, the Boffins, and people's general reaction to John Harmon's "death". Harmon also uses the alias Julius Handford upon first returning to London. Harmon's "death" and subsequent resurrection as Rokesmith/Handford is consistent with Dickens's recurring theme in the novel of rebirth from the water. His upward social mobility through his own efforts is presented as favourable, in contrast with Headstone, Hexam, and the Lammles.
- "Bella" Wilfer – is a beautiful young woman born into a poor family, who learns upon the death of Old Mr Harmon that she is the intended wife for his son, a condition of his inheritance. When her intended husband, John Harmon, is reported to have been killed, she is left without future prospects. She learns of the trouble money can bring when taken in by the newly rich Boffins. Bella rejects Rokesmith's proposal at first but later accepts it. Initially described as a "mercenary young woman", who describes herself upon meeting Lizzie Hexam as having "no more character than a canary bird", Bella undergoes a significant moral change in the novel. Although originally completely preoccupied with money, her complexity is eventually displayed in her ability to defy the societal pressures to achieve happiness unrelated to wealth. She is praised for her "vivacity and lifelikeness", with greater complexity than some of the other, more static characters. Her relationship with her father is more like that of a mother and son, as she consistently dotes upon him, calling him her "cherub". Her open and warm relationship with her father contrasts with her strained and resentful relationships with her mother and sister.
- Nicodemus "Noddy" Boffin, the Golden Dustman (the dust from the ashes of coal fires dominated in waste materials at this period, so “dust” became a term used for waste or rubbish generally) – becomes a member of the nouveaux riches when Old Mr Harmon's heir is considered dead. He is illiterate, but wants to fit the image of a wealthy man, and so hires Silas Wegg to read to him in hopes of gaining more intelligence and worldliness. He is nearly blackmailed by Wegg. He assumes the role of a miser to show Bella the dangers of wealth, but eventually admits this behaviour was an act and gives his money to Bella and John. Boffin's innocence, naïve curiosity, and desire to learn in his new position in life contrast with his "elaborate performances as Boffin the miser". Critics speculate that Dickens's decision to have Boffin playing a part may not have been planned, as it was not very convincing for a man who has shown his simplistic ignorance on several occasions. Boffin's inheritance of Old Harmon's money is appropriate because Harmon had attained it by combing the dust heaps, because this suggests social mobility. Boffin represents a wholesome contrast to such wealthy characters as the Veneerings and Podsnaps, and may have been based on Henry Dodd, a ploughboy who made his fortune removing London's rubbish.
- Mrs Henrietta Boffin – is Noddy Boffin's wife, and a very motherly woman, who convinces Mr Boffin to take in an orphan boy called Johnny. This indicates "another progressive development for Dickens as his female characters undertake a more active role in social reform".
- Elizabeth "Lizzie" Hexam – is a daughter of Gaffer Hexam and sister of Charley Hexam. She is an affectionate daughter, but knows that Charley must escape their living circumstances if he is to succeed in life, so she gives Charley her money and helps him leave while their father is away. Later she is rejected by Charley after she remains in poverty. Pursued romantically by both Bradley Headstone and Eugene Wrayburn, she fears Headstone's violent passion and yearns for Wrayburn's love, while acutely aware of the social gap between them. Lizzie saves Wrayburn after Headstone's attack. Wrayburn marries her as he is expected to die after the attack. She in effect acts as the moral centre of the story and is by far the "most wholly good character […] almost bereft of ego". Dickens carries over her moral superiority into her physical characterisation. Her "capacity for self-sacrifice […] is only slightly more credible than her gift for refined speech", making her slightly unbelievable in comparison to her uneducated father and Jenny Wren. Lizzie's concern about social class reveals her reasoning for ensuring her brother's escape from poverty and ignorance, though she remains humble about her own situation. However, her moral character attracts Wrayburn and her inherent goodness is rewarded with marital happiness.
- Charles "Charley" Hexam – is the son of Jesse "Gaffer" Hexam and brother of Lizzie. Originally a very caring brother, this changes as he rises above Lizzie in class and must remove himself from her to maintain his social standing. He was born into poverty, but receives schooling and becomes a teacher under Headstone's mentoring. Dickens uses him to critique both the schooling available to the poor, which was often over-crowded and noisy, as well as the snobbish tendencies of those who manage to rise in status. Hexam is presented as "morally corrupt", because of how he distances himself from his past, and from his loving sister, in the name of his own upward movement.
- Mortimer Lightwood – is a lawyer, who is an acquaintance of the Veneerings and a friend of Eugene Wrayburn. Lightwood acts as the "storyteller" and it is through him that the reader and the other characters learn about Harmon's will. However, under the "mask of irony" he assumes in telling his stories, he feels true friendship for Eugene, respect for Twemlow, and concern for the issues in which he is involved. In addition, he also serves as the "commentator and a voice of conscience" with sarcasm sometimes covering his concern. Through Lightwood's reason and advice, the reader is better able to judge the characters' actions.
- Eugene Wrayburn – who is seen as the novel's second hero, is a barrister, and a gentleman by birth, though he is roguish and insolent. He is a close friend of Mortimer Lightwood, and involved in a love triangle with Lizzie Hexam and Bradley Headstone. Both these characters act as foils to Wrayburn. Lizzie contrasts with Eugene's more negative traits and Headstone makes Eugene appear more virtuous. He is nearly killed by Headstone but, like Harmon/Rokesmith, "reborn" after his incident in the river. Though Wrayburn appears morally grey through most of the novel, by the end he is seen as a moral, sympathetic character and a true gentleman, after choosing to marry Lizzie in order to save her reputation, even though she is socially below him.
- "Jenny" Wren – whose real name is Fanny Cleaver, is "the dolls' dressmaker", with whom Lizzie lives after her father dies. She is disabled with a bad back and limited leg mobility. She treats her drunken father as her "bad child". Jenny later cares for Eugene while he recovers from Headstone's attack on his life. She may have a romance with Sloppy at the end of the book, which the reader may surmise will end in marriage. Although her mannerisms give her a certain "strangeness", Jenny is very perceptive, identifying Eugene Wrayburn's intentions towards Lizzie in his small actions. Her role is a creator and a caretaker, and her "pleasant fancies" of "flowers, bird song, numbers of blessed, white-clad children" reflect the mind's ability to rise above adverse circumstances.
- Mr Riah – is a Jew who manages Mr Fledgeby's money-lending business. He cares for and assists Lizzie Hexam and Jenny Wren when they have no one else. Some critics believe that Riah was meant by Dickens to act as an apology for his stereotyping of Fagin in Oliver Twist, and in particular a response to Mrs Eliza Davis. She had written to Dickens complaining that "the portrayal of Fagin did 'a great wrong' to all Jews." However, some still take issue with Riah, asserting that he is "too gentle to be a believable human being."
- Bradley Headstone – began life as a pauper but rose to become Charley Hexam's schoolmaster and the love interest of Miss Peecher. However, he ignores her and falls in love with Lizzie Hexam, whom he pursues passionately and violently, though his advances are rejected. He then develops an insane jealousy towards Eugene Wrayburn, whom he follows at night like an "ill-tamed wild animal" in hopes of catching him with Lizzie. He disguises himself as Rogue Riderhood and almost succeeds in beating and drowning Wrayburn. After Riderhood realises that Headstone is impersonating him to incriminate him for Wrayburn's murder, he attempts to blackmail Headstone. Headstone decides to kill himself and attacks Riderhood at the lock, intentionally drowning both in the river. Described repeatedly as "decent" and "constrained", Headstone's personality splits between "painfully respectable" and "wild jealousy", with a "passion terrible in its violence". He is presented by Dickens as an animal in the night and a respectable, "mechanical" schoolteacher during the day. A possible explanation for this dichotomy may be Headstone's "intellectual insecurity", that manifests itself in violence after Lizzie's rejection. The "most complex of Dickens's villain-murderers are presented as such double-figures". Dickens here demonstrates the way identity can be manipulated. Headstone also serves as a foil to Wrayburn, and his evil nature antagonizes Wrayburn, as much as Lizzie's goodness helps him.
- Silas Wegg – is a ballad-seller, and has a wooden leg. He is a "social parasite", hired to read for the Boffins and teach Mr Boffin how to read, despite not being entirely literate himself. Wegg finds Harmon's will in the dust heaps, and he and Venus attempt to use it to blackmail the Boffins. He wishes to buy back his own leg as soon as he has the money, which is an attempt to "complete himself". Wegg claims to want the leg so that he can be seen as respectable. Some critics find the juxtaposition of Wegg's villainy and his sense of humour to be inconsistent.
- Mr Venus – a taxidermist and articulator of bones, who is in love with Pleasant Riderhood, whom he eventually marries. He meets Silas Wegg after having procured his amputated leg and he pretends to join Silas in blackmailing Mr Boffin regarding Harmon's will, while really informing Boffin of Silas's scheme. Dickens is said to have based Mr Venus on a real taxidermist named J Willis, although Venus's "defining obsession" renders him "among Dickens's most outlandish, least realistic" characters.
- Mr Alfred Lammle – is married to Sophronia Lammle. Both of them, at the time of their marriage, were under the false impression that the other was fairly wealthy. Subsequently, they are forced to use their overabundance of charm and superficiality in attempts to make influential acquaintances and gain money through them.
- Mrs Sophronia Lammle – is described, early in the novel, as "the mature young lady" and a proper young woman. However, this turns out to be ironic as she is later shown to be greedy, cold, and manipulative. She married Alfred Lammle because she believed he had money, and when it turned out he did not, the two of them formed a partnership that involves swindling money from others. They, for example, conspire to trap Georgiana Podsnap in a marriage with Fledgeby, though Sophronia repents before this plan can come to fruition, and arranges for Twemlow to inform the Podsnaps without her husband's knowledge.
- Georgiana Podsnap – a daughter of Mr and Mrs Podsnap, who is very sheltered, shy, trusting and naïve. Because of this she is taken advantage of by more manipulative upper-class characters, such as Fledgeby and the Lammles, who scheme to "befriend" her and take her money. She is courted by Fledgeby, through Alfred Lammle, although not with honourable intentions, and nearly finds herself trapped in a marriage with Fledgeby until Sophronia Lammle suffers a change of heart.
- Mr Fledgeby – "Fascination" Fledgeby is a friend of the Lammles. He owns Mr Riah's moneylending business, is greedy and corrupt, and makes his money through speculation. He provides a contrast with Mr Riah's gentleness, and underlines the point that "a Jew may be kindly and a Christian cruel". Fledgeby nearly marries Georgiana Podsnap to gain access to her money, but Sophronia Lammle backs out of the scheme and, once Fledgeby is no longer allied with the Lammles, they seek him out and beat him.
- Roger "Rogue" Riderhood – "Gaffer" Hexam's partner until Gaffer rejects him when he is convicted of theft. In revenge for that slight he falsely turns Gaffer in as the murderer of John Harmon, in the hope of receiving a reward. Later, Riderhood becomes a lock-keeper, and Headstone attempts to frame him for the murder of Eugene Wrayburn. After attempts to blackmail Headstone, Headstone attacks Riderhood and intentionally drowns both in the lock. In his "literally irredeemable villainy", Riderhood represents an opportunistic character who will change his behaviour according to whatever suits his needs best at any given moment.
- Reginald "Rumty" Wilfer – is Bella Wilfer's doting father, who is gentle, innocent, fatherly, and kindly, despite his querulous wife and daughter and thankless work as a clerk. Dickens describes him in almost childish terms, and he is often called "the Cherub".

=== Minor characters ===
- Mr Inspector – a police officer, who acts as a witness to several important events, such as when the corpse from the river is mistakenly identified as John Harmon, when Gaffer Hexam is taken into custody, and when the real John Harmon is named. In general, he is "imperturbable, omnicompetent, firm but genial, and an accomplished actor", who commands authority. However he is not particularly effective in his administration of the law, and this leads to doubt about the justice system in the novel.
- Mr John Podsnap – a pompous man of the upper middle class, married to Mrs Podsnap and the father of Georgiana, who is smug and jingoistic. Some critics believe that Dickens used Podsnap to satirise John Forster, Dickens's lifelong friend and official biographer. However, Dickens insisted he only used some of Forster's mannerisms for this character, who was in no way to represent his closest friend. Forster, like Dickens, rose with difficulty from an impoverished middle-class background. The character of Podsnap was used to represent the views of "Society", as shown in his disapproval of Lizzie Hexam and Eugene Wrayburn's marriage.
- Mrs Podsnap – the mother of Georgiana Podsnap. Though she embodies the materialistic ideals of her husband and daughter, Mrs Podsnap is the least prominent of the family. She is described as a "fine woman" in her embodiment of the typical upper middle class wife.
- Mrs Wilfer – Bella's mother, a woman who is never satisfied with what she has. Her haughtiness is apparent in the way she acts at the Boffins' home and when Bella and Rokesmith return after their wedding. Her animosity towards her husband, her greed and discontent contrast with her husband's good nature and provide an image of what Bella could become, should she not change.
- Lavinia Wilfer – Bella's younger sister and George Sampson's fiancée. Vocal and opinionated, she is the only character who will stand up to Mrs Wilfer by matching her derisiveness and audacity. In some ways, she acts as a foil to Bella, and while Bella overcomes her desire for money and appreciates other aspects of life, Lavinia remains resentful in her poverty.
- George Sampson – Lavinia Wilfer's suitor, who was originally in love with Bella. He provides comic relief and a contrast with the idyllic relationship between Bella and Rokesmith/Harmon.
- Mr Melvin Twemlow – the well-connected friend of the Veneerings, who is often cultivated for his supposed influence with powerful people, such as his first cousin, Lord Snigsworth. Mrs Lammle tells him about their plot to marry Georgiana Podsnap and Fledgeby, to whom Twemlow owes money. Though Twemlow is introduced as being as insensible as a table at the Veneerings' dinner party, he comes to reflect a wise way of thinking. His wearing of a collar and cravat creates a "picturesque and archaic" impression, and he proves himself a "true gentleman in his response to Wrayburn's marriage".
- Mrs Betty Higden – a child-minder, who takes in poor children and cares for them, including Johnny, the orphan whom the Boffins plan to adopt before he dies in the children's hospital. She is old and poor, and portrayed sympathetically as pitiable. She is so terrified of dying in the workhouse that, when she begins to grow sick, she runs away to the country and ends up dying in Lizzie Hexam's arms. Mrs Higden draws readers' attention to the miserable lives led by the poor, and the need for social reform.
- Johnny – the orphan great-grandson of Betty Higden. The Boffins plan on adopting Johnny, but he dies in the Children's Hospital before they are able to do so.
- Sloppy – a foundling who assists Betty Higden in taking care of children. Raised in the workhouse, he has a learning disability, but is nevertheless adept at reading the newspaper for Mrs Higden. He is portrayed as inherently innocent because of his disability, and carts away Wegg at the end of the novel.
- Jesse "Gaffer" Hexam – a waterman and the father of Lizzie and Charley, who makes a living by robbing corpses found in the river Thames. His former partner, Rogue Riderhood, turns him in for the murder of John Harmon after Harmon's body is supposedly dragged from the river. A search is mounted to find and arrest Gaffer, but he is discovered dead in his boat. Gaffer's opposition to education prompts Lizzie to sneak Charley away to school, though she stays with her father. As a result, Gaffer disowns Charley as a son. In a sense, Gaffer predicted the alienating effect education would have on Charley.
- Pleasant Riderhood – the daughter of Rogue Riderhood, who works in a pawn shop, and, like Jenny Wren and Lizzie Hexam, is another daughter caring for her abusive father as though he were her child, and who, in vain, tries to steer him along the path of right. She eventually marries Mr Venus.
- Mr and Mrs Veneering – a nouveau-riche husband and wife whose main preoccupation is to advance in the social world. They invite influential people to their dinner parties where their furniture gleams with a sheen that they also put on to make themselves seem more impressive. They "wear" their acquaintances, their possessions, and their wealth like jewellery, in an attempt to impress those around them. Veneering eventually goes bankrupt and they retire to France to live on the jewels he bought for his wife.
- Miss Abbey Potterson – mistress of the Six Jolly Fellowship Porters, she keeps the inn respectable, and only allows patrons to drink as much as she sees fit. She is likened, humorously, to a schoolmistress, linking her to the novel's concern with education.
- Miss Peecher – a school teacher who is in love with Bradley Headstone. She is a "good and harmless" character, though she displays an "addiction to rules and forms". In addition, she shows a "naive confidence in the outward appearance of things", as demonstrated by her love of Headstone, a villain who gives the impression of being good.
- Mr Dolls – Jenny Wren's alcoholic father. Jenny calls him her "bad child", and treats him accordingly. His real name is not known to Eugene, so Eugene calls him "Mr Dolls". As his daughter is really named Fanny Cleaver, his name might be Mr Cleaver, but he is never called by a name other than "my bad child", or "Mr Dolls" in the novel.
- George Radfoot – third mate on the ship bringing John Harmon back to England, whose dead body, found in the river by Gaffer Hexam, is identified as being Harmon, because of the papers found in his pockets. He had been involved in crimes and schemes with Riderhood, who most likely was responsible for trying to kill Harmon and killing Radfoot.

== Plot summary ==
Mr Harmon, a miser who has made his fortune in London's rubbish collection trade, has died, estranged from all except his employees Mr and Mrs Boffin. His will indicates that his fortune will go to his estranged son, John Harmon, on the condition that he returns from his home abroad (possibly in South Africa) and marries Miss Bella Wilfer, a woman he has never met.

John does not appear, though some knew him aboard the ship to London. A body is found in the Thames by waterman Gaffer Hexam, rowed by his daughter Lizzie. Hexam makes his living by retrieving corpses and taking the cash in their pockets before handing them over to the authorities. Papers in the pockets of the drowned man identify him as Harmon. Present at the identification of the water-soaked corpse is a young man, who gives his name as Julius Handford and disappears.

The elder Harmon's estate devolves upon Mr and Mrs Boffin, who wish to enjoy it for themselves and to share it with others. They take pity on Miss Bella Wilfer, whose fortunes are thought to have been lost with John's death, take her into their household, and treat her as their pampered child and heiress. Bella is disgusted by her lower middle class upbringing and obsessed with marrying a wealthy man. They also accept an offer from the man who had called himself Julius Handford – now going under the name of John Rokesmith – to serve as their confidential secretary and man of business at no salary for a trial period of two years. Rokesmith uses this position to watch and learn everything about the Boffins and Miss Wilfer. Mr Boffin engages one-legged ballad-seller Silas Wegg to read aloud to him in the evenings. When the Boffins purchase a large home, Wegg is invited to live in the old Harmon home. Wegg hopes to find hidden treasure in the house or in the mounds of rubbish on the property.

Gaffer is accused of murdering John Harmon by fellow waterman Roger "Rogue" Riderhood, who is bitter at having been cast off as Hexam's partner and covets the reward offered by the Boffins in relation to the murder. As a result of the accusation, Gaffer is shunned by his fellows on the river and excluded from The Six Jolly Fellowship-Porters, the public house they frequent. Hexam's young son Charley leaves Gaffer's house to better himself at school and to train to be a schoolmaster, encouraged by his sister Lizzie. Lizzie stays with Gaffer, to whom she is devoted.

Before Riderhood can claim the reward for his false allegation, Gaffer is found to have drowned. Lizzie becomes the lodger of a doll's dressmaker, a disabled teenager nicknamed "Jenny Wren". Jenny's alcoholic father lives with them and is treated by Jenny as a child. Meanwhile, Mr and Mrs Lammle are a couple who married each other for money, only to discover that neither has any. They attempt to obtain financial advantage by pairing heiress Georgiana Podsnap with Mr Fledgeby. He is an extortioner and money-lender, who uses the kindly old Jew Mr Riah as his cover, temporarily causing Riah to fall out with his friend and protégée Jenny.

The work-shy barrister Eugene Wrayburn eventually meets and falls in love with Lizzie but soon gains a violent rival in Bradley Headstone, Charley's schoolmaster. Charley wants Lizzie to be under obligation to no one but him, and tries to arrange lessons for her with Headstone, only to find that Wrayburn has already engaged a teacher for both Lizzie and Jenny. Headstone makes a proposal to Lizzie, who refuses. Angered by this and by Wrayburn's dismissive attitude towards him, Headstone comes to see Wrayburn as the source of all his misfortunes and takes to following him at night. Lizzie fears Headstone's threats to Wrayburn and is unsure of Wrayburn's intentions toward her (Wrayburn admits to Lightwood that he does not know his own intentions yet, either). She flees both men, getting work up-river from London, aided by Mr Riah.

Mr and Mrs Boffin attempt to adopt a young orphan, in the care of his great-grandmother Betty Higden, but the boy dies. Mrs Higden minds children for a living, assisted by a foundling known as Sloppy. When Lizzie finds Mrs Higden dying and stops to care for her, she meets the Boffins and Bella Wilfer.

Rokesmith is in love with Bella Wilfer, but she cannot bear to accept him, having insisted that she will marry only for money. Mr Boffin appears to be corrupted by his wealth and obsessed with biographies of misers. He begins to treat Rokesmith with contempt, stinginess, and cruelty. This arouses Bella Wilfer's sympathy; and when the Lammles (hoping to take Bella and Rokesmith's place as Mr Boffin's favorites) reveal to Mr Boffin that Rokesmith has proposed to Bella and he dismisses Rokesmith, she stands up for him. Rokesmith and Bella marry and live happily, though in relatively poor circumstances. Bella soon conceives.

Meanwhile, Wrayburn has obtained information about Lizzie's whereabouts from Jenny's father and finds the object of his affections. Following Wrayburn upriver, Headstone engages with Riderhood, now working as a lock-keeper. Headstone is consumed with executing his threats against Wrayburn. After following Wrayburn up river and seeing him with Lizzie, he attacks Wrayburn and leaves him for dead. Headstone had tried to place blame for the assault on Rogue Riderhood by dressing in similar clothes when doing the deed and throwing his own clothes in the river. Riderhood fetches the bundle of clothing. Lizzie finds Wrayburn in the river and rescues him, with the help of Jenny, who discovered Fledgeby's trick and reconciled with Mr Riah. On his deathbed, Wrayburn marries Lizzie and suppresses any hint that Headstone was his attacker to save her reputation. When he survives, he is glad that his near-death experience brought him into a loving marriage. Although her social inferiority had not bothered him, he believes Lizzie would not otherwise have married him due to the social gulf between them.

When Headstone learns Wrayburn is alive, recovering from the brutal beating, and married to Lizzie, he is overcome with the hopelessness of his situation. Riderhood confronts Headstone in his classroom and attempts to blackmail him. Headstone follows him back upriver and – seized with a self-destructive urge – grabs Riderhood and flings both of them into the lock, where they both drown.

Meanwhile, Silas Wegg has, with help from Mr Venus (an "articulator of bones"), searched the dust mounds and discovered a later will of the Elder Harmon, which bequeaths his estate to the Crown rather than the Boffins. Wegg decides to blackmail Boffin, but Venus has second thoughts and reveals the plot to Boffin.

It gradually becomes clear to the reader that John Rokesmith is in fact John Harmon. Harmon had switched clothes with his shipmate en route to London, because he wanted an opportunity to learn about his betrothed before claiming his inheritance. The shipmate agreed, with the intention of stealing Harmon's money. However, Riderhood had drugged, robbed, and dumped both Harmon and his shipmate into the river. Harmon survived the attempted murder and maintained his alias to try to win Bella Wilfer for himself, rather than his inheritance. Now that she has married him, believing him to be poor, he throws off his disguise. It is revealed that Mr Boffin's apparent miserliness and ill-treatment of his secretary were part of a scheme to test Bella's motives.

When Wegg attempts to clinch his blackmail on the basis of the later will, Boffin turns the tables by revealing a still later will by which the fortune is granted to Boffin even at young John Harmon's expense. The Boffins are determined to make the Harmons their heirs anyway, so all ends well, except for Wegg, who is carted away by Sloppy. Sloppy himself becomes friendly with Jenny Wren, whose father has died.

== Original publication ==
Our Mutual Friend, like most Dickens novels, was published in monthly instalments. Each of the 19 instalments cost one shilling (with the exception of the nineteenth, which was double-length and cost two). Each issue featured 32 pages of text and two illustrations by Marcus Stone. Sales of Our Mutual Friend were 35,000 for the first monthly number, but then dropped by 5,000 for the second number. The concluding double number (instalments XIX–XX) sold 19,000.

BOOK THE FIRST: THE CUP AND THE LIP

- I – May 1864 (chapters 1–4);
- II – June 1864 (chapters 5–7);
- III – July 1864 (chapters 8–10);
- IV – August 1864 (chapters 11–13);
- V – September 1864 (chapters 14–17).

BOOK THE SECOND: BIRDS OF A FEATHER

- VI – October 1864 (chapters 1–3);
- VII – November 1864 (chapters 4–6);
- VIII – December 1864 (chapters 7–10);
- IX – January 1865 (chapters 11–13);
- X – February 1865 (chapters 14–16).

BOOK THE THIRD: A LONG LANE

- XI – March 1865 (chapters 1–4);
- XII – April 1865 (chapters 5–7);
- XIII – May 1865 (chapters 8–10);
- XIV – June 1865 (chapters 11–14);
- XV – July 1865 (chapters 15–17).

BOOK THE FOURTH: A TURNING

- XVI – August 1865 (chapters 1–4);
- XVII – September 1865 (chapters 5–7);
- XVIII – October 1865 (chapters 8–11);
- XIX-XX – November 1865 [chapters 12–17 (Chapter the Last)].

== Historical contexts ==
=== Dickens and Our Mutual Friend ===
Inspiration for Our Mutual Friend possibly came from Richard Henry Horne's essay "Dust; or Ugliness Redeemed", published in Household Words in 1850, which contains a number of situations and characters that are found in the novel. These include a dust heap, in which a legacy lies buried, a man with a wooden leg, who has an acute interest in the dust heap, Silas Wegg, and another character, Jenny Wren, with "poor withered legs". In 1862 Dickens jotted down in his notebook: "LEADING INCIDENT FOR A STORY. A man—young and eccentric?—feigns to be dead, and is dead to all intents and purposes, and ... for years retains that singular view of life and character". Additionally, Dickens's longtime friend John Forster was a possible model for the wealthy, pompous John Podsnap.

Our Mutual Friend was published in nineteen monthly numbers, in the fashion of many earlier Dickens novels, for the first time since Little Dorrit (1855–57). A Tale of Two Cities (1859) and Great Expectations (1860–61) had been serialised in Dickens's weekly magazine All the Year Round. Dickens remarked to Wilkie Collins that he was "quite dazed" at the prospect of putting out twenty monthly parts after more recent weekly serials.

Our Mutual Friend was the first of Dickens's novels not illustrated by Hablot Browne, with whom he had collaborated since The Pickwick Papers (1836–37). Dickens chose instead the younger Marcus Stone and, uncharacteristically, left much of the illustrating process to Stone's discretion. After suggesting only a few slight alterations for the cover, for instance, Dickens wrote to Stone: "All perfectly right. Alterations quite satisfactory. Everything very pretty". Stone's encounter with a taxidermist named Willis provided the basis for Dickens's Mr Venus, after Dickens had indicated he was searching for an uncommon occupation ("it must be something very striking and unusual") for the novel.

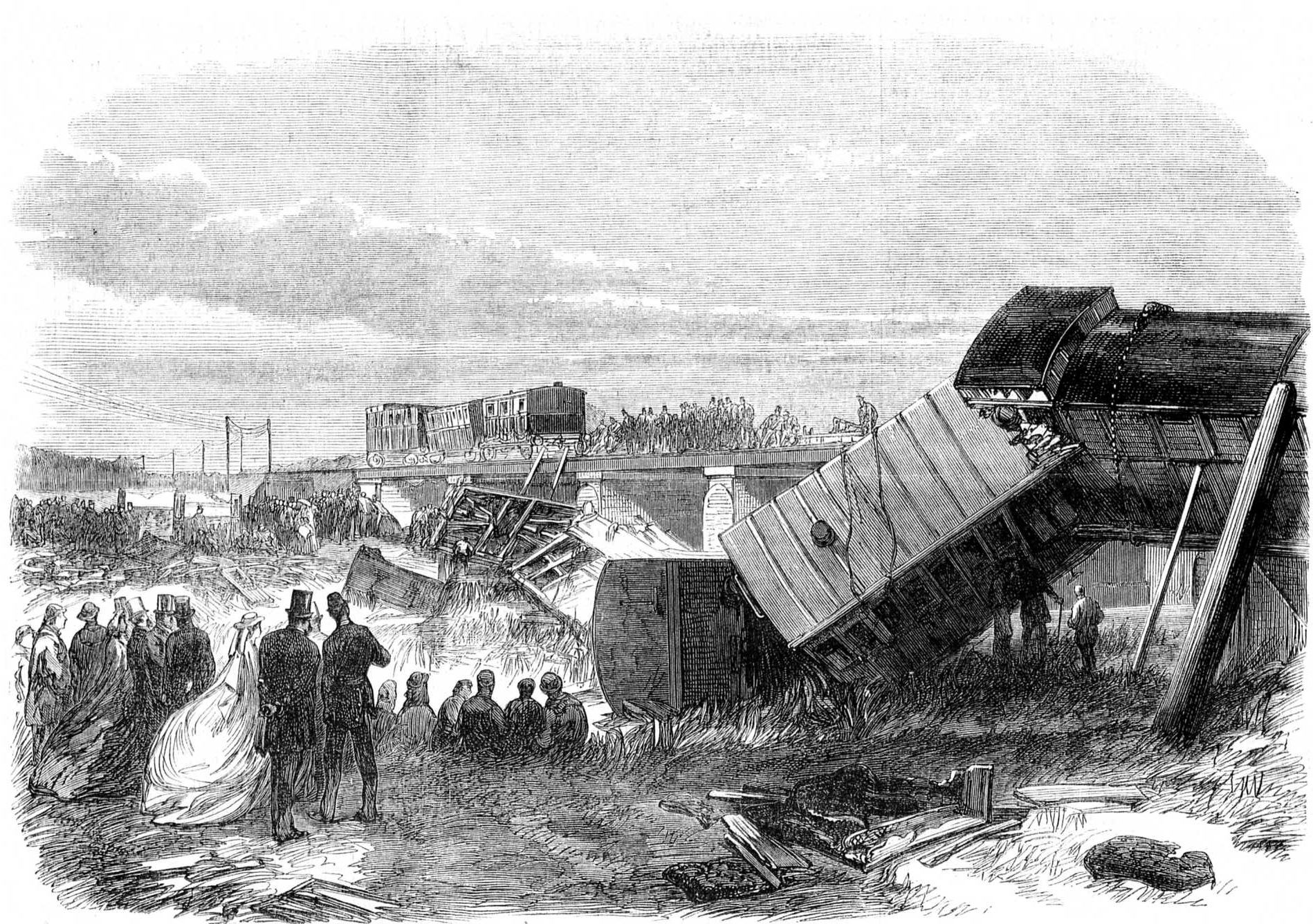
Staplehurst rail accident

Dickens, who was aware that it was now taking him longer than before to write, made sure he had built up a safety net of five serial numbers before the first went to publication for May 1864. He was at work on number sixteen when he was involved in the traumatic Staplehurst rail crash. Following the crash, and while tending to the injured among the "dead and dying," Dickens went back to the carriage to rescue the manuscript from his overcoat. With the resulting stress, from which Dickens would never fully recover, he came up two and a half pages short for the sixteenth serial, published in August 1865. Dickens acknowledged this close brush with death, which nearly cut short the composition of Our Mutual Friend, in the novel's postscript:

On Friday the Ninth of June in the present year, Mr and Mrs Boffin (in their manuscript dress of receiving Mr and Mrs Lammle at breakfast) were on the South-Eastern Railway with me, in a terribly destructive accident. When I had done what I could to help others, I climbed back into my carriage—nearly turned over a viaduct, and caught aslant upon the turn—to extricate the worthy couple. They were much soiled, but otherwise unhurt. [...] I remember with devout thankfulness that I can never be much nearer parting company with my readers for ever than I was then, until there shall be written against my life, the two words with which I have this day closed this book:—THE END.

Dickens was travelling with Ellen Ternan and her mother.

=== Marriage ===
In Our Mutual Friend Dickens explores the conflict between doing what society expects and the idea of being true to oneself. With regard to this the influence of the family is important. In many of Dickens's novels, including Our Mutual Friend and Little Dorrit, parents try to force their children into arranged marriages. John Harmon, for example, was supposed to marry Bella to suit the conditions of his father's will, and though, initially, he refused to marry her for that reason, he later married her for love. Harmon goes against his father's wishes in another way when, by taking the alias of John Rokesmith, he refuses his inheritance. Bella is also swayed by the influence of her parents. Her mother wishes her to marry for money to better the fortunes of the entire family, although her father is happy with her marrying John Rokesmith for love. Bella's marriage to Rokesmith goes against what is expected of her by her mother, but eventually her mother accepts the fact that Bella has at least married someone who will make her happy. However, later on in the novel, Bella accepts the everyday duties of a wife, and seemingly gives up her independence. Yet she refuses to be the "doll in the doll's house"; and is not content with being a wife who rarely leaves her home without her husband. Furthermore, Bella reads up on the current events so that she can discuss them with her husband, and is actively involved in all of the couple's important decisions.

Lizzie Hexam also objects to the expectation of marriage to Eugene Wrayburn, because she sees the difference in their social class status. Without marriage, their connection risks her reputation. She does not aspire to marrying Wrayburn even though she loves him and would be elevated in society simply by marrying him, which almost any woman would have done at the time. Lizzie feels that she is unworthy of him. Wrayburn, however, feels that he is unworthy of such a good woman. He also knows that his father would disapprove of her low social status. She goes against expectations when she refuses to marry Bradley Headstone. He would have been an excellent match for her by social class, according to norms of the time, however, Lizzie does not love him. She unselfishly does what others expect of her, like helping Charley escape their father to go to school, and living with Jenny Wren. Marrying Wrayburn is the only truly selfish act Lizzie commits in Our Mutual Friend, out of her love for him, when he made up his mind to ask her.

=== Status of women ===
Because of the rapid increase in wealth generated by the Industrial Revolution, women gained power through their households and class positions. It was up to the women in Victorian society to display their family's rank by decorating their households. This directly influenced the man's business and class status. Upper-class homes were ornate, as well as packed full of materials, so that "A lack of clutter was to be considered in bad taste." Through handcrafts and home improvement, women asserted their power over the household: "The making of a true home is really our peculiar and inalienable right: a right, which no man can take from us; for a man can no more make a home than a drone can make a hive" (Frances Cobbe).

=== Jews ===
The Jewish characters in Our Mutual Friend are more sympathetic than Fagin in Oliver Twist. In 1854, The Jewish Chronicle had asked why "Jews alone should be excluded from the 'sympathizing heart' of this great author and powerful friend of the oppressed." Dickens (who had extensive knowledge of London street life and child exploitation) explained that he had made Fagin Jewish because "it unfortunately was true, of the time to which the story refers, that that class of criminal almost invariably was a Jew". Dickens commented that by calling Fagin a Jew he had meant no imputation against the Jewish faith, saying in a letter, "I have no feeling towards the Jews but a friendly one. I always speak well of them, whether in public or private, and bear my testimony (as I ought to do) to their perfect good faith in such transactions as I have ever had with them". Eliza Davis, whose husband had purchased Dickens's home in 1860 when he had put it up for sale, wrote to Dickens in June 1863 urging that "Charles Dickens the large hearted, whose works please so eloquently and so nobly for the oppressed of his country ... has encouraged a vile prejudice against the despised Hebrew." Dickens responded that he had always spoken well of Jews and held no prejudice against them. Replying, Mrs Davis asked Dickens to "examine more closely into the manners and character of the British Jews and to represent them as they really are."

In his article, "Dickens and the Jews," Harry Stone claims that this "incident apparently brought home to Dickens the irrationality of some of his feelings about Jews; at any rate, it helped, along with the changing times, to move him more swiftly in the direction of active sympathy for them." Riah in Our Mutual Friend is a Jewish moneylender yet (contrary to stereotype) a profoundly sympathetic character, as can be seen especially in his relationship with Lizzie and Jenny Wren; Jenny calls him her "fairy godmother" and Lizzie refers to Riah as her "protector", after he finds her a job in the country and risks his own welfare to keep her whereabouts a secret from Fledgeby (his rapacious—and Christian—master).

== Water imagery ==
A major symbol is the River Thames, which is linked to the major theme of rebirth and renewal. Water is seen as a sign of new life, and associated with the Christian sacrament of Baptism. Characters like John Harmon and Eugene Wrayburn end up in the river, and come out reborn. Wrayburn emerges from the river close to death, but is ready to marry Lizzie, and to avoid naming his attacker to save her reputation. He surprises everyone, including himself, when he survives and goes on to have a loving marriage with Lizzie. John Harmon also appears to end up in the river through no fault of his own, and when Gaffer pulls a body dressed like Harmon out of the waters, Harmon adopts the alias of John Rokesmith. This alias is for his own safety and peace of mind; he wants to know that he can do things on his own, and does not need his father's name or money to make a good life for himself.

Dickens uses many images that relate to water. Phrases such as the "depths and shallows of Podsnappery," and the "time had come for flushing and flourishing this man down for good", are examples of such imagery. Some critics see this as being used excessively.

== Themes ==
Aside from examining the novel's form and characters, modern critics of Our Mutual Friend have focused on identifying and analysing what they perceive as the main themes of the novel. Although Stanley Friedman's 1973 essay "The Motif of Reading in Our Mutual Friend" emphasises references to literacy and illiteracy in the novel, Friedman states, "Money, the dust-heaps, and the river have been seen as the main symbols, features, that help develop such themes as avarice, predation, death and rebirth, the quest for identity and pride. To these images and ideas, we may add what Monroe Engel calls the 'social themes of Our Mutual Friend—having to do with money-dust, and relatedly with the treatment of the poor, education, representative government, even the inheritance laws.'"

According to Metz, many of the prominent themes in Dickens's earlier works of fiction are intricately woven into Dickens's last novel. She states, "Like David Copperfield, Our Mutual Friend is about the relationship between work and the realization of self, about the necessity to be 'useful' before one can be 'happy.' Like Great Expectations, it is about the power of money to corrupt those who place their faith in its absolute value. Like Bleak House, it is about the legal, bureaucratic, and social barriers that intervene between individuals and their nearest neighbours. Like all of Dickens's novels, and especially the later ones, it is about pervasive social problems—poverty, disease, class bitterness, the sheer ugliness and vacuity of contemporary life."

== Literary significance and criticism ==
=== Contemporary critics of Dickens ===
At the time of its original serial publication, Our Mutual Friend was not regarded as one of Dickens's greatest successes, and on average fewer than 30,000 copies of each instalment was sold. Though The New York Times, of 22 November 1865, conjectured, "By most readers ... the last work by Dickens will be considered his best," direct evidence of how readers responded to Dickens's novels is scarce. Because Dickens burned his letters, the voices of his nineteenth-century serial audiences remain elusive. Thus, evidence of the reactions of his Victorian era readers must be obtained from reviews of Our Mutual Friend by Dickens's contemporaries.

The first British periodical to print a review of Our Mutual Friend, published 30 April 1864 in The London Review, extolled the first serial instalment, stating, "Few literary pleasures are greater than that which we derive from opening the first number of one of Mr Dickens's stories" and "Our Mutual Friend opens well".

In 1866 George Stott found the novel flawed: "Mr Dickens must stand or fall by the severest canons of literary criticism: it would be an insult to his acknowledged rank to apply a more lenient standard; and bad art is not the less bad art and a failure because associated, as it is in his case, with much that is excellent, and not a little that is even fascinating."

Dickens had his fans and detractors just like every author throughout the ages, but not even his most strident supporters like E. S. Dallas felt that Our Mutual Friend was perfect. Rather, the oft acknowledged "genius" of Dickens seems to have overshadowed all reviews and made it impossible for most critics to completely condemn the work, the majority of these reviews being a mixture of praise and disparagement.

In November 1865 E. S. Dallas, in The Times, lauded Our Mutual Friend as "one of the best of even Dickens's tales," but was unable to ignore the flaws. "This last novel of Mr Charles Dickens, really one of his finest works, and one in which on occasion he even surpasses himself, labours under the disadvantage of a beginning that drags ... On the whole, however, at that early stage the reader was more perplexed than pleased. There was an appearance of great effort without corresponding result. We were introduced to a set of people in whom it is impossible to take an interest, and were made familiar with transactions that suggested horror. The great master of fiction exhibited all his skill, performed the most wonderful feats of language, loaded his page with wit and many a fine touch peculiar to himself. The agility of his pen was amazing, but still at first we were not much amused." Despite the mixed review, it pleased Dickens so well that he gave Dallas the manuscript.

==== Plot ====
Many critics found fault with the plot, and in 1865, The New York Times described it as an "involved plot combined with an entire absence of the skill to manage and unfold it". In the London Review, in the same year, an anonymous critic felt that "the whole plot in which the deceased Harmon, Boffin, Wegg, and John Rokesmith, are concerned, is wild and fantastic, wanting in reality, and leading to a degree of confusion which is not compensated by any additional interest in the story" and he also found that "the final explanation is a disappointment." However, the London Review also thought, that "the mental state of a man about to commit the greatest of crimes has seldom been depicted with such elaboration and apparent truthfulness."

==== Characters ====
Many reviewers responded negatively to the characters in Our Mutual Friend. The 1865 review by Henry James in The Nation described every character as "a mere bundle of eccentricities, animated by no principle of nature whatever", and condemned Dickens for a lack of characters who represent "sound humanity". James maintained that none of the characters add anything to the reader's understanding of human nature, and asserted that the characters in Our Mutual Friend, were "grotesque creatures", who did not represent actual existing Victorian types.

Like James, the 1869 article "Table Talk" in Once a Week did not view the characters in Our Mutual Friend as realistic. The article asks: "Do men live by finding the bodies of the drowned, and landing them ashore 'with their pockets allus inside out' for the sake of the reward offered for their recovery? As far as we can make out, no. We have been at some trouble to inquire from men who should know; watermen, who have lived on the river nigh all their lives, if they have seen late at night a dark boat with a solitary occupant, drifting down the river on the 'look out,' plying his frightful trade? The answer has uniformly been 'No, we have never seen such men,' and more, they do not believe in their existence."

The reviewer in the London Review in 1865 denounced the characters of Wegg and Venus, "who appear to us in all the highest degree unnatural—the one being a mere phantasm, and the other a nonentity." However he applauded the creation of Bella Wilfer: "Probably the greatest favourite in the book will be—or rather is already—Bella Wilfer. She is evidently a pet of the author's, and she will long remain the darling of half the households of England and America." E. S. Dallas, in his 1865 review, concurred that "Mr Dickens has never done anything in the portraiture of women so pretty and so perfect" as Bella.

Dallas also admired the creation of Jenny Wren—who was greeted with contempt by Henry James—stating that, "The dolls' dressmaker is one of his most charming pictures, and Mr Dickens tells her strange story with a mixture of humour and pathos which it is impossible to resist."

In an 1867 Atlantic Monthly article entitled "The Genius of Dickens", critic Edwin Percy Whipple declared that Dickens's characters "have a strange attraction to the mind, and are objects of love or hatred, like actual men and women."

==== Pathos and sentiment ====
In October 1865 an unsigned review appeared in the London Review stating that "Mr Dickens stands in need of no allowance on the score of having out-written himself. His fancy, his pathos, his humour, his wonderful powers of observation, his picturesqueness, and his versatility, are as remarkable now as they were twenty years ago." But like other critics, after praising the book this same critic then turned around and disparaged it: "Not that we mean to say Mr Dickens has outgrown his faults. They are as obvious as ever—sometimes even trying our patience rather hard. A certain extravagance in particular scenes and persons—a tendency to caricature and grotesqueness—and a something here and there which savours of the melodramatic, as if the author had been considering how the thing would 'tell' on the stage—are to be found in Our Mutual Friend, as in all this great novelist's productions."

Edwin Whipple in 1867 also commented on the sentiment and pathos of Dickens's characters, stating, "But the poetical, the humorous, the tragic, or the pathetic element is never absent in Dickens's characterization, to make his delineations captivating to the heart and imagination, and give the reader a sense of having escaped from whatever in the actual world is dull and wearisome."

However, in 1869 George Stott condemned Dickens for being overly sentimental: "Mr Dickens's pathos we can only regard as a complete and absolute failure. It is unnatural and unlovely. He attempts to make a stilted phraseology, and weak and sickly sentimentality do duty for genuine emotion." Still, in the manner of all the other mixed reviews, Stott states that "we still hold him to be emphatically a man of genius."

The Spectator in 1869 concurred with Stott's opinion, writing "Mr Dickens has brought people to think that there is a sort of piety in being gushing and maudlin," and that his works are heavily imbued with the "most mawkish and unreal sentimentalism", but the unsigned critic still maintained that Dickens was one of the great authors of his time.

=== Later literary criticism ===
G. K. Chesterton, one of Dickens's critics in the early 20th century, expressed the opinion that Mr Boffin's pretended fall into miserliness was originally intended by Dickens to be authentic, but that Dickens ran out of time and so took refuge in the awkward pretence that Boffin had been acting. Chesterton argues that while we might believe Boffin could be corrupted, we can hardly believe he could keep up such a strenuous pretence of corruption: "Such a character as his—rough, simple and lumberingly unconscious—might be more easily conceived as really sinking in self-respect and honour than as keeping up, month after month, so strained and inhuman a theatrical performance. ... It might have taken years to turn Noddy Boffin into a miser; but it would have taken centuries to turn him into an actor." However, Chesterton also praised the book as being a return to Dickens's youthful optimism and creative exuberance, full of characters who "have that great Dickens quality of being something which is pure farce and yet which is not superficial; an unfathomable farce—a farce that goes down to the roots of the universe."

In his 1940 article "Dickens: Two Scrooges", Edmund Wilson states, "Our Mutual Friend, like all these later books of Dickens, is more interesting to us today than it was to Dickens's public. Certainly the subtleties and profundities that are now discovered in it were not noticed by the reviewers." As a whole, modern critics of Our Mutual Friend, particularly those of the last half century, have been more appreciative of Dickens's last completed work than his contemporary reviewers. Although some modern critics find Dickens's characterisation in Our Mutual Friend problematic, most tend to positively acknowledge the novel's complexity and appreciate its multiple plot lines.

In November 2019, BBC Arts included Our Mutual Friend on its list of the 100 most inspiring novels.

==== Form and plot ====
In his 2006 article "The Richness of Redundancy: Our Mutual Friend," John R. Reed states, "Our Mutual Friend has not pleased many otherwise satisfied readers of Dickens's fiction. For his contemporaries and such acute assessors of fiction as Henry James, the novel seemed to lack structure, among other faults. More recently, critics have discovered ways in which Dickens can be seen experimenting in the novel." Reed maintains that Dickens's establishment of "an incredibly elaborate structure" for Our Mutual Friend was an extension of Dickens's quarrel with realism. In creating a highly formal structure for his novel, which called attention to the novel's own language, Dickens embraced taboos of realism. Reed also argues that Dickens's employment of his characteristic technique of offering his reader what might be seen as a surplus of information within the novel, in the form of a pattern of references, exists as a way for Dickens to guarantee that the meaning of his novel might be transmitted to his reader. Reed cites Dickens's multiple descriptions of the River Thames and repetitive likening of Gaffer to "a roused bird of prey" in the novel's first chapter as evidence of Dickens's use of redundancy to establish two of the novel's fundamental themes: preying/scavenging and the transformative powers of water. According to Reed, to notice and interpret the clues representing the novel's central themes that Dickens gives his reader, the reader must have a surplus of these clues. Echoing Reed's sentiments, in her 1979 article "The Artistic Reclamation of Waste in Our Mutual Friend," Nancy Aycock Metz claims, "The reader is thrown back upon his own resources. He must suffer, along with the characters of the novel, from the climate of chaos and confusion, and like them, he must begin to make connections and impose order on the details he observes."

In his 1995 article "The Cup and the Lip and the Riddle of Our Mutual Friend", Gregg A. Hecimovich reaffirms Metz's notion of reading the novel as a process of connection and focuses on what he sees as one of the main aspects of Dickens's narrative: "a complex working out of the mysteries and idiosyncrasies presented in the novel." Unlike Dickens's contemporary critics, Hecimovich commends Dickens for Our Mutual Friend's disjunctive, riddle-like structure and manipulation of plots, declaring, "In a tale about conundrums and questions of identity, divergence of plots is desirable." Hecimovich goes on to say that in structuring his last novel as a riddle-game, Dickens challenges conventions of nineteenth-century Victorian England and that the "sickness" infecting Dickens's composition of Our Mutual Friend is that of Victorian society generally, not Dickens himself.

==== Characters ====
Harland S. Nelson's 1973 article "Dickens's Our Mutual Friend and Henry Mayhew's London Labour and the London Poor" examines Dickens's inspiration for two of the novel's working class characters. Nelson asserts that Gaffer Hexam and Betty Higden were potentially modelled after real members of London's working class whom Mayhew interviewed in the 1840s for his nonfiction work London Labour and the London Poor. Unlike some of Dickens's contemporaries, who regarded the characters in Our Mutual Friend as unrealistic representations of actual Victorian people, Nelson maintains that London's nineteenth-century working class is authentically depicted through characters such as Gaffer Hexam and Betty Higden.

While novelist Henry James dismissed the minor characters Jenny Wren, Mr Wegg, and Mr Venus as "pathetic characters" in his 1865 review of the novel, Gregg Hecimovich in 1989 refers to them as "important riddlers and riddlees." Hecimovich suggests that, "Through the example of his minor characters, Dickens directs his readers to seek, with the chief characters, order and structure out of the apparent disjunctive 'rubbish' in the novel, to analyze and articulate what ails a fallen London ... Only then can the reader, mimicking the action of certain characters, create something 'harmonious' and beautiful out of the fractured waste land."

Some modern critics of Our Mutual Friend have been overall more critical of the novel's characters. In her 1970 essay "Our Mutual Friend: Dickens as the Compleat Angler," Annabel Patterson declares, "Our Mutual Friend is not a book which satisfies all of Dickens's admirers. Those who appreciate Dickens mainly for the exuberance of his characterization and his gift for caricature feel a certain flatness in this last novel". Deirdre David claims that Our Mutual Friend is a novel through which Dickens "engaged in a fictive improvement of society" that bore little relation to reality, especially regarding the character of Lizzie Hexam, whom David describes as a myth of purity among the desperate lower-classes. David criticises Dickens for his "fable of regenerated bourgeois culture" and maintains that the character Eugene Wrayburn's realistic counterpart would have been far more likely to offer Lizzie money for sex than to offer her money for education.

== Adaptations and influence ==
=== Television ===
- 1958. Our Mutual Friend: BBC serial adapted by Freda Lingstrom. Unusual for most BBC series of the time, the serial still exists entirely, and in 2017 was released to DVD by Simply Media.
- 1976. Our Mutual Friend: BBC serial directed by Peter Hammond.
- 1998. Our Mutual Friend: BBC serial adapted by Sandy Welch. It starred Steven Mackintosh and Anna Friel.

=== Film ===
- 1911. Eugene Wrayburn, a silent film adapted from the novel and starring Darwin Karr in the title role.
- 1921. Vor Faelles Ven (Our Mutual Friend) Danish silent film version directed by Ake Sandberg; restoration by Danish Film Institute (missing about 50% of the second part) shown at Museum of Modern Art, New York, NY, on 12/21 and 12/22/12 (on DVD).

=== Radio ===
- 1984. BBC Radio 4 broadcast Betty Davies's 10-hour adaptation.
- 2009. BBC Radio 4 broadcast Mike Walker's 5-hour adaptation.

=== Miscellaneous ===
- 1919. In Thornton W. Burgess's Burgess Bird Book for Children, "Jenny Wren" is a leading character.
- 1922. T. S. Eliot's poem The Waste Land had, as a working title, "He Do the Police in Different Voices", an allusion to something said by Betty Higden about Sloppy.
- 1920s. Sir Harry Johnston wrote a sequel to Our Mutual Friend, titled The Veneerings, published in the early 1920s.
- 2004–2010. In the television show Lost, Desmond Hume saves a copy of Our Mutual Friend, the last book he intends to read before he dies. It is most prominently featured in the season 2 finale, Live Together, Die Alone. The same character later names his sailboat Our Mutual Friend.
- 2005. Paul McCartney released a song "Jenny Wren" on his Chaos and Creation in the Backyard album about the character of Jenny Wren.
- 2016. The video game Assassin's Creed: Syndicate included additional missions titled "The Darwin and Dickens Conspiracy". One of the memories in this extra game play is called 'Our Mutual Friend' and includes slightly altered character names and situations similar to the novel.
- Lizzie Hexam, extracted from the book and transported into the real world, was a main character in the 2009–2015 Vertigo Comics series The Unwritten.
- 2024. The play London Tide, presented by the National Theatre in London, is based on Our Mutual Friend. It is adapted by Ben Power with songs by Ben Power and PJ Harvey.
