= Freda Lingstrom =

English TV producer (1893–1989)

Freda Lingstrom OBE
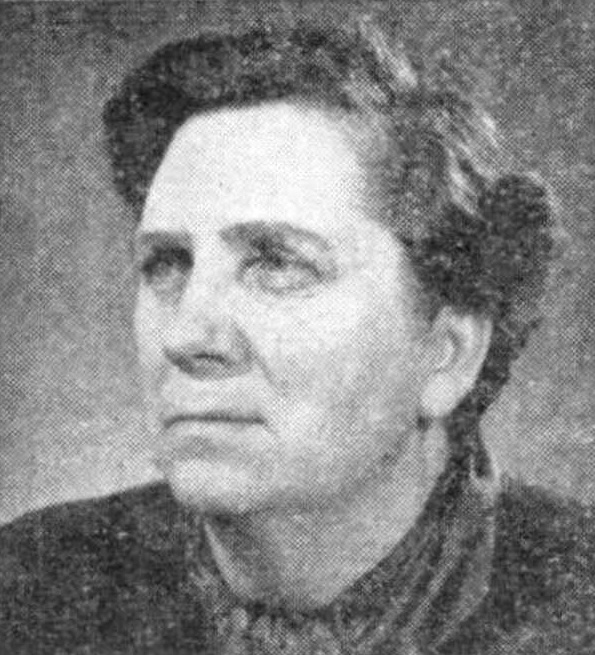
- Lingstrom in 1952
- Born: Freda Violet Lingstrom; 23 July 1893; Chelsea, London
- Died: 15 April 1989 (aged 95); Chartwell
- Occupation: Producer
- Notable work: Andy Pandy, The Flower Pot Men

Freda Violet Lingstrom OBE (23 July 1893 – 15 April 1989) was a BBC Television producer and executive, responsible for pioneering children's programmes in the early 1950s. She and her friend Maria Bird together created Andy Pandy and The Flower Pot Men.

== Early life and career ==
Lingstrom was born in Chelsea, London, the daughter of George Lingstrom, a copperplate engraver, and Alice Clarey Anniss. Her paternal grandfather was Swedish. She attended the Central School of Arts and Crafts and became an artist.

Lingstrom gained her first job at Alf Cooke's London works as a designer, where she stayed for 15 months. After periods at Carlton Studios and Norfolk, Lingstrom decided in 1922 to work on her own. Her first clients were railway companies, including the London and North Eastern Railway, the Underground Group and the Norwegian state railway. The Norwegian and Swedish government commissioned her to design Scandinavian travel material for the English market.

Lingstrom also wrote two novels, The Seventh Sister (1938) and A Flower in his Hand (1939), and a book, This is Norway (1933), about the country's culture and history. Her skills as a graphic designer, illustrator and author led to her joining the editorial staff of a children's magazine, Junior, where she worked from 1945 until 1949.

== The BBC and Andy Pandy ==
In 1940, Lingstrom was hired by the BBC. In 1947, she became Assistant Head of BBC Schools Broadcasting and created the lunchtime programme Listen with Mother. She was asked by the Head of Television Talks, Mary Adams, to create a programme for an experimental slot aimed at very young children and called For The Very Young. Eventually, Lingstrom and Maria Bird set up Westerham Arts (named after Westerham, where they lived) to produce the first pre-filmed version of their Andy Pandy. Lingstrom and Bird wrote the scripts and Bird composed the music. A chance meeting on a train introduced Lingstrom to Audrey Atterbury, who was persuaded to study under the puppeteer John Wright of the Little Angel Theatre in London.

In June 1950, production began on Andy Pandy, which began a trial broadcast of four live episodes on 11 July. After several episodes, Andy was joined by Teddy and Looby Loo, while Molly Gibson joined the small team to help Audrey perform with the puppets. The show was narrated by Maria Bird, as were all the 1950s black-and-white original Watch With Mother episodes. The songs were performed by Gladys Whitred, with Maria Bird on piano.

== Directorship ==
Lingstrom was appointed director of BBC Children's Television in 1951, and the following year the slot for pre-school children was renamed Watch with Mother. Westerham Arts eventually created four different programmes for weekdays with Flower Pot Men, The Woodentops, and Rag, Tag and Bobtail. Picture Book was also commissioned so that there was a different programme for each weekday.

Lingstrom commissioned a wide range of programmes, including high-quality drama as well as entertainment programmes such as Crackerjack and those featuring Harry Corbett and Sooty. She gave Johnny Morris his first TV appearances as The Hot Chestnut Man (1953–1961). Her programmes was in the tradition of Lord Reith, which meant they were aimed at education as much as entertainment. She resisted cartoons and imported programmes. Although the programmes were widely approved of by adults, the launch of ITV in 1955 soon made it clear that many children wanted something different. The ratings for the BBC's children's programmes plummeted over the following year, when Lingstrom was replaced as Head of BBC Children's Television by Owen Reed. In retrospect Lingstrom's programmes have been seen professionally as "cosy and slightly over-protective in tone". Her last writing credit was a twelve-part adaptation of Charles Dickens' Our Mutual Friend, broadcast on BBC One in late 1958.

== Personal life ==
Lingstrom lived in Chartwell Cottage, Mapleton Lane, Chartwell, near Westerham in Kent, with Maria Bird, a close friend and co-creator of her TV characters. Bird died around 1979 following surgery for a broken hip operation. Both had lost fiancés in the First World War. After working for the BBC, she continued to write books for children and on art criticism. She died at her home in Chartwell in 1989, aged 95. Her estate still controls the rights to Andy Pandy and Flowerpot Men.

== Written works ==
- This is Norway (1933)
- The Seventh Sister (1938)
- A Flower in his Hand (1939)
- Beggar's Fiddle (1948)
- Nicolas and Antoinette (1949)
- The Seeing Eye. How to look at natural and man-made things with pleasure and understanding (1960)*
- Richard's Wheel (1961)

| Preceded by Cecil Madden | Head of BBC Children's Television; 1951–1956 | Succeeded by Owen Reed |
