= The Woodentops (TV series) =

BBC children's puppet show (1955–57)

- Opening titles
- Genre: Children's television series; Puppet show
- Created by: Freda Lingstrom; Maria Bird
- Voices of: Maria Bird; Eileen Browne; Josephina Ray; Peter Hawkins
- Narrated by: Maria Bird
- Country of origin: United Kingdom
- Original language: English
- No. of episodes: 26

Production
- Running time: 15 minutes

Original release
- Network: BBC Television
- Release: 9 September 1955 – 2 March 1956

The Woodentops is a children's television series first shown on BBC Television in 1955. Created by Freda Lingstrom and Maria Bird, it featured on the Friday edition of Watch with Mother and regularly repeated until 1973. The main characters are the members of a family living on a farm. The aim of the programme was to teach pre-school children about family life.

== Puppet characters ==
- Daddy Woodentop
- Mummy Woodentop
- Jenny Woodentop
- Willy Woodentop
- Baby Woodentop
- Spotty Dog ("the very biggest spotty dog you ever did see")

The children, Jenny and Willy, were twins. They spoke, walked and did many things together.

Other characters included:

- Mrs Scrubbitt (who comes to help Mrs Woodentop)
- Sam (who helps Daddy Woodentop with the animals)
- Buttercup the Cow

== Cast ==
- Scripts and music: Maria Bird
- Puppeteers: Audrey Atterbury, Molly Gibson and Gordon Murray
- Voices: Eileen Browne, Josephina Ray, Peter Hawkins
- Designs: Barbara Jones

== Episodes ==
=== Series (1955-1956) ===
| No. | Title | Original release date |
|---|---|---|
| 1 | "Introduction" | 9 September 1955 |
| 2 | "Boats and Pigs" | 16 September 1955 |
| 3 | "Horse" | 23 September 1955 |
| 4 | "Spotty's Paw" | 30 September 1955 |
| 5 | "Spotty's Sheep" | 7 October 1955 |
| 6 | "Spotty's Joke" | 14 October 1955 |
| 7 | "Dog Washing" | 21 October 1955 |
| 8 | "Injured Bird" | 28 October 1955 |
| 9 | "Bird Set Free" | 4 November 1955 |
| 10 | "Twins' Holiday" | 11 November 1955 |
| 11 | "Soap Box" | 18 November 1955 |
| 12 | "Baby's Bath" | 25 November 1955 |
| 13 | "Surprises" | 2 December 1955 |
| 14 | "Show" | 9 December 1955 |
| 15 | "Party" | 16 December 1955 |
| 16 | "Buttercup" | 23 December 1955 |
| 17 | "Belling the Cow" | 30 December 1955 |
| 18 | "Hayfield" | 6 January 1956 |
| 19 | "Horse Shoe" | 13 January 1956 |
| 20 | "Steam Roller" | 20 January 1956 |
| 21 | "Geese" | 27 January 1956 |
| 22 | "Ducks" | 3 February 1956 |
| 23 | "Pram" | 10 February 1956 |
| 24 | "Dinner Bell" | 17 February 1956 |
| 25 | "Sacks" | 24 February 1956 |
| 26 | "Paper Hats" | 2 March 1956 |

== Production ==
The Woodentops was filmed in a tin shed at the BBC's Lime Grove Studios. The narrator/storyteller for all episodes, who also provided the dialogue for Mummy Woodentop, was Maria Bird who spoke with Received Pronunciation, as was typical of BBC presenters of the time. Daddy Woodentop, being a farmer, spoke with a noticeable West Country accent.

Although set on a farm, at an unspecified location, each episode began with the whole family being introduced as they sat in front of a tall curtain, apparently on a stage. Episodes closed with the family grouped in the same pose, with the word "GOODBYE" superimposed above.

The music at the beginning and end of each story is taken from the 22nd piece ("So lokka me over den myra") of the set of 25 Norwegian folk songs and dances for piano, Opus 17 by Edvard Grieg. This music, which is quite short in duration, is called "Kulokk", which translates to "Cattle-Call". It is divided into two sections, the first of which is used for the introduction and the second part for the end of each story. It occasionally appears as a leitmotif in the stories, hummed by Mummy Woodentop from time to time.

In 1983, the original puppets were stolen from the BBC. They were spotted a year later in an auction room in London and returned. The puppets are now in the Museum of London's permanent collection.

== The Official BBC Children in Need Medley ==
In 2009, The Woodentops appeared in The Official BBC Children in Need Medley music video which reached No.1 in the UK Singles Chart. Jenny and Willy Woodentop appeared in the video; Jenny also appears on the front cover of the CD and DVD.
