= Flower Pot Men =

British children's television series

- Still from original BBC series, with Little Weed (centre)
- Created by: Freda Lingstrom
- Voices of: Peter Hawkins
- Narrated by: Maria Bird
- Country of origin: United Kingdom
- Original language: English
- No. of series: 1
- No. of episodes: 26

Production
- Running time: 14–16 minutes
- Production company: BBC

Original release
- Network: BBC Television Service
- Release: 18 December 1952 – 10 June 1953

Related
- Bill and Ben

Flower Pot Men is a British programme for young children produced by BBC Television. It was first transmitted in 26 episodes from 1952 to 1953, and repeated regularly for more than twenty years. A remake of the programme called Bill and Ben was broadcast in 2001.

The original programme was part of a BBC children's television series titled Watch with Mother, featuring a different programme each weekday, most of them involving string puppets.

== Premise ==
Flower Pot Men features the story of Bill and Ben, two men made of terracotta flower pots who live at the bottom of an English garden. A third character, Little Weed, of indeterminate species resembling either a sunflower or a dandelion with a smiling face, is shown growing between two large flowerpots. The three are also sometimes visited by a tortoise called Slowcoach and, in one particular episode, the trio meet a faintly mysterious character made out of potatoes, Dan the Potato Man.

Typically, while the "man who worked in the garden" would be away having his dinner, the two flower pot men, Bill and Ben, would emerge from their pots. After a minor adventure, a slight mishap would occur, for which someone would then take the blame: "Which of these two flowerpot men, was it Bill or was it Ben?" the narrator would trill in a quavering soprano; the culprit would then confess, before the gardener's footsteps would be heard coming up the garden path; the flower pot men then would vanish into their pots and the "Goodbye" screen would appear. The final punch-line was, "..and I think the little house knew something about it; don't you?".

== Production ==
According to her adopted daughter Alison Gassier, Freda Lingstrom got the idea for the show after spending time in her woodshed with a flowerpot. She assembled the production crew, which consisted mainly of those who had worked on her previous show Andy Pandy: her associate Maria Bird, who wrote the songs and music and narrated, puppeteers Audrey Atterbury and Molly Gibson, and singers Gladys Whitred and Julia Whitaker (nee Williams). (Note: Whitred also provided the voice of Little Weed, with the exception of episode Tiny Men, in which Whitaker took over.) The only new member was Peter Hawkins, who voiced both Bill and Ben, inventing their gibberish language, named Oddle-Poddle. He based the language on select words such as "Slogalog" (Slowcoach the Tortoise) and "Haddap" (Hello).

The puppets were made to look as if they were made from flowerpots. Cupcake holders were used for their hats, which sometimes caught onto their strings. Peter particularly praised Audrey's puppetry for being very precise. The scripts were written in English, with Peter translating them into Oddle-Poddle.

== Episodes ==
No. in series	Title	Original release date
1	"Seeds"	18 December 1952
2	"Musical Vegetables"	25 December 1952
3	"Cabbages"	1 January 1953
4	"The Potato Man"	8 January 1953
5	"Tiny Men"	15 January 1953
6	"Stickmen"	22 January 1953
7	"Shavings Men"	29 January 1953
8	"Stilts"	5 February 1953
9	"Steamroller"	12 February 1953
10	"Scarecrow"	19 February 1953
11	"Slowcoach Flies"	26 February 1953
12	"Mud Pies"	5 March 1953
13	"Bath in Hat"	12 March 1953
14	"Babies"	19 March 1953
15	"Babies Grow Up"	26 March 1953
16	"Live Chicks"	2 April 1953
17	"Icicles"	9 April 1953
18	"Boot Race"	16 April 1953
19	"Acrobats"	22 April 1953
20	"Bellows"	29 April 1953
21	"Water Lilies"	6 May 1953
22	"Turnip Faces"	13 May 1953
23	"Umbrella"	20 May 1953
24	"Fairy Queen"	27 May 1953
25	"Weathercock"	3 June 1953
26	"Flying Boots"	10 June 1953

== UK VHS Releases ==
VHS	Release date	Episodes
Bill and Ben - Flower Pot Men (BBCV 4212)	6 February 1989	"Musical Vegetables"; "Scarecrow"; "Flying Boots"; "Icicles"
Bill and Ben - Flower Pot Men 2: Tales from the Bottom of the Garden (BBCV 4362)	4 June 1990	"Bath in Hat"; "Cabbages"; "Bellows"; "Stickmen"
The Very Best of Bill and Ben - Flower Pot Men (BBCV 5111)	6 September 1993	"Stickmen"; "Scarecrow"; "Bath in Hat"; "Musical Vegetables"; Cabbages

== Confusion with other characters ==
Retired headteacher Hilda Brabban created an unrelated set of characters also named Bill and Ben. These have been confused with the Flower Pot Men, including in the initial versions of two obituaries of Brabban, published in The Independent and BBC's in-house magazine Ariel respectively. The confusion also affected the BBC panel show QI, where host Stephen Fry in the 2004 episode Bills mistakenly claimed Brabban had named the Flower Pot Men characters after her younger brothers. All three sources later corrected their statements. Brabban sold three stories about a Bill and Ben to the BBC in the 1950s; but other than their names, they bore no resemblance to the Flower Pot Men. Brabban's stories were broadcast on the radio programme Listen with Mother in 1951; the Bill and Ben of the Flower Pot Men were first seen on the television programme Watch with Mother in 1952. Both programmes were produced by Freda Lingstrom. During her later life Brabban suffered a stroke and later maintained she did invent the characters used in the BBC series; this prompted lawyers, acting on behalf of the estate of the show's creator, Freda Lingstrom, to threaten Brabban with litigation if she appeared on television to propagate this claim.

== Comics ==
The show was the basis for a comic strip of the same name in the children's magazine Robin.

== Legacy ==
The short lived one-hit wonder group, The Flower Pot Men, known for their 1967 song "Let's Go to San Francisco", named the group after the show, although it caused controversies with people suggesting it may have had something to do with marijuana. Bill and Ben themselves may have inspired the names of the twin characters Bill and Ben from Thomas the Tank Engine and Friends.
