= Michael Cole (writer) =

British writer

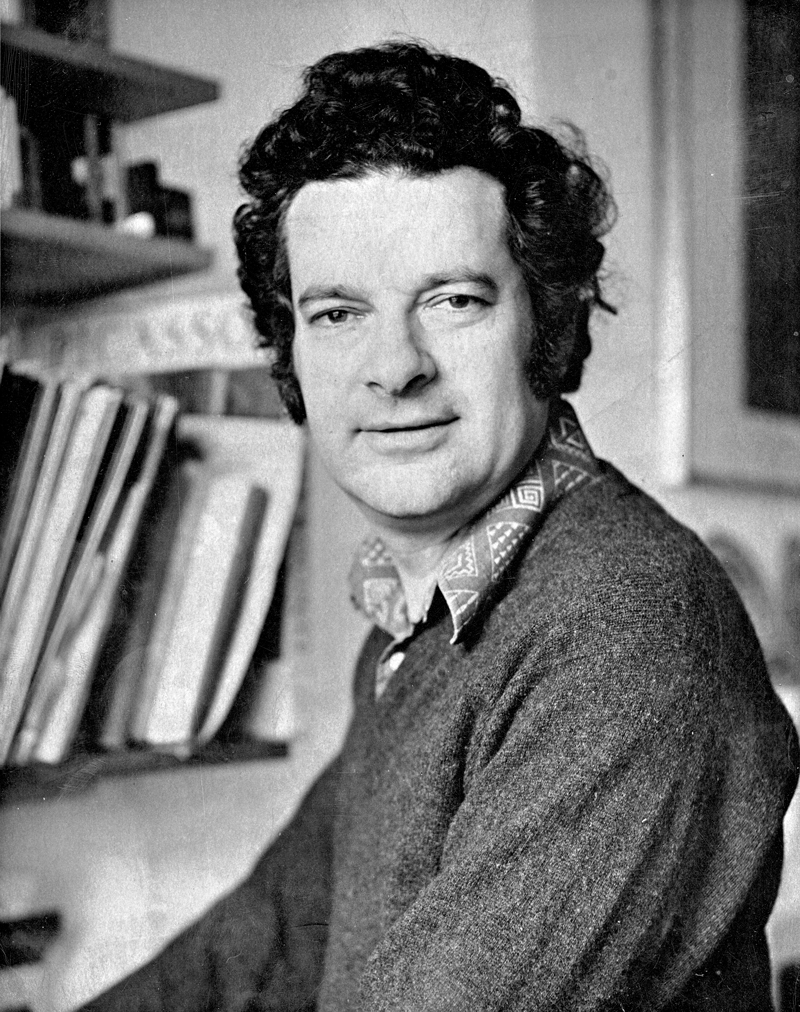
- Michael Cole (writer-TV producer)
- Born: 17 March 1933; Willesden, London, England
- Died: 4 August 2001 (aged 68)
- Occupation: Writer / TV producer
- Spouses: Joanne Cole (1955-1985); Pam (1992-2001)
- Writing career
- Genres: Children's TV and books
- Notable works: Bod, Fingerbobs, Ragtime
- Notable awards: 1973 BAFTA Best Children's Programme

Michael Cole (17 March 1933 – 4 August 2001) was a British writer. He created a number of children's programmes from the 1970s to the 1990s, including Alphabet Castle, Heads and Tails and Ragtime, for which he won a Society of Film and Television Award (later known as a BAFTA) for Best Children's Programme. Together with his wife Joanne Cole, he created Bod, originally published as four books in 1965 and made into a TV show in the 1970s, as well as Fingerbobs and Gran.

== Life and work ==
Michael Cole was born in Willesden, London on 17 March 1933. During the war he and his family were evacuated to Cheltenham where after junior school he went to Cheltenham College. He trained as an intelligence officer during national service in the army and was sent to Cambridge University to learn Russian. In 1959, he collaborated with Halas and Batchelor writing for two series of animated shorts (Habatales) for ABC Weekend TV, including The Cultured Ape which was awarded best film in its category at the 1959 Venice Film Festival.

In 1964 Cole moved with his wife and two children to the South of France where they created the first Bod books which were published by Metheun in 1965. Two years later, and now with four children, Cole began working for BBC children's television, initially writing and directing for Play School. and Play Away. In 1972 Michael and Joanne Cole created Fingerbobs, songs and stories with simple paper puppets and artwork by Joanne Cole. The show starred Rick Jones and was shown on BBC until 1984. In 1972, Cole wrote and directed Ragtime a BBC studio programme with songs and sketches, featuring puppets by Joanne Cole, illustrations by Quentin Blake and music by Peter Gosling. The programme won a Society of Film and Television Award (later known as a BAFTA) in 1973 for Best Children's Programme and was followed by a second series.

In 1975, Cole developed the four original Bod books into a thirteen episode animated cartoon series for BBC. Narrated by John Le Mesurier and Maggie Henderson with music by Derek Griffiths, nine new stories were created which were later made into books. The films were animated by Alan Rogers and the programmes also featured Alberto Frog with artwork by Joanne Cole. Bod was broadcast on BBC until 1984. It was also shown in Australia, New Zealand, the Netherlands, Sweden, Finland, Norway, Poland and Israel. In the United States, Bod aired on Nickelodeon as part of the Pinwheel program.

Music and songwriting were always major parts of Cole's programmes and another collaboration with Derek Griffiths led to Heads and Tails in 1977. The show was made up of archive and specially shot footage of animals with humorous voices, songs and music by Griffiths. Songs from both Ragtime and Heads and Tails were released as vinyl LPs.

In the early 1980s Cole wrote and directed two studio programmes for BBC, Bric-a-brac starring Brian Cant in a fictitious junk shop and Chockablock featuring a big yellow computer and presented by Fred Harris and Carol Leader. He also worked with David Yates in creating Pigeon Street animated by Alan Rogers and Peter Lang. The 13 episodes featured everyday people and animals living on Pigeon street, including such characters as long distant lorry driver, Clara, with a song to match. It was shown on BBC from 1981 and repeated until 1994.

In 1982 Cole created Gran co-written with Joanne Cole. These tales of a most surprising grandmother, which were later developed into books, were animated by Ivor Wood (who had worked on the first series of Postman Pat ) and were narrated by Patricia Hayes. In 1985, Cole's wife Joanne died of cancer aged 51. The same year Fingermouse was released, a musical version of Fingerbobs starring the paper mouse and other puppets, Joanne Cole's last work. In 1987, Cole wrote 26 episodes of Edward and Friends, a stop-motion animated Lego with narration by Bernard Cribbins. and created Dot Stop for Playdays which aired on BBC from 1989 to 1997.

In 1992, Cole married his second wife Pam and from 1993 to 1995 wrote and produced three series of Alphabet Castle and Tinysaurs for Carlton TV.

In 2000, Cole started working on a new Bod book which he left unfinished before he died of cancer in 2001 at age 68. One year later, Bod's Way was published, written and illustrated by his children Alison and Laurence and based on Cole's original ideas.

== TV shows ==
- Play School – 1967–88
- Play Away – 1971–76
- Fingerbobs – 1972
- Ragtime – 1973
- Bod – 1975
- Heads and Tails – 1977
- Bricabrac – 1980
- Pigeon Street – 1981
- Chockablock – 1981
- Stop and Go – 1981
- Gran – 1982
- Fingermouse – 1985
- Pie in the Sky – 1986
- Playdays – 1988–1997
- Alphabet Castle – 1993
- Tinysaurs – 2000

== Publications ==
- Bod's Apple - 1965
- Bod's Present - 1965
- Bod's Dream - 1965
- Bod and the Cherry Tree - 1965
- Wet Albert - 1967
- Kate and Sam's Pet - 1971
- Kate and Sam's Tea - 1971
- Kate and Sam's New Home - 1971
- Kate and Sam Go Out - 1971
- The Baby and the Band - 1973
- The Boot in the Field - 1973
- Bod and Breakfast - 1977
- Bod and the Dog - 1977
- Bod and the Grasshopper - 1977
- Bod's Kite - 1977
- Bod and the Beach - 1977
- Bod and the Cake - 1977
- Bod and the Birds - 1977
- Pigeon Street books - 1982
- Gran books - 1985
- Edward and Friends books - 1987
- Head in the Sand - 1989

== Theatre ==
Cole worked with composer Paul Reade on a musical version of Aesop's fables, A Feast of Fables, and the musical fairytale Cinderella, performed all over the UK.

== Discography ==
- Ragtime - lyrics by Michael Cole and music by Peter Gosling. BBC records, 1974.
- Heads and Tails - lyrics by Michael Cole and music by Derek Griffiths. BBC records,1980.
- Fingerbobs - lyrics by Michael Cole and music by Michael Jessett, Trunk records 2011.
