= A Chorus of Frogs =

- The Avengers episode
- Screen title
- Episode no.: Season 2 Episode 24
- Directed by: Raymond Menmuir
- Written by: Martin Woodhouse
- Production code: 3523
- Original air date: 9 March 1963

Guest appearances
- Eric Pohlmann; Yvonne Shima; Colette Wilde; John Carson; Frank Gatliff; Michael Gover; Alan Haywood

Episode chronology
← Previous "Conspiracy of Silence"	Next → "Six Hands Across a Table"

"A Chorus of Frogs" is the twenty-fourth episode of the second series of the 1960s cult British spy-fi television series The Avengers, starring Patrick Macnee and Julie Stevens. It was first broadcast by ABC on 9 March 1963. The episode was directed by Raymond Menmuir and written by Martin Woodhouse.

== Plot ==
While Steed is on a vacation in Greece, he is asked to investigate the death of Greek deep-sea diver and smuggler, who was part of a group of part-time agents known as "the Frogs". To do so, he stows away on the yacht of a shady millionaire, who is secretly funding experiments to develop improved breathing mixtures for a deep-sea bathysphere.

== Music ==
Julie Stevens sings Hush, Little Baby and The Lips That Touch Kippers Burnaby & Long's Parody of the Temperance song "The Lips That Touch Liquor".

== Cast ==
- Patrick Macnee as John Steed
- Julie Stevens as Venus Smith
- Eric Pohlman as Archipelago Mason
- Yvonne Shima as Anna Lee
- Colette Wilde as Helena
- John Carson as Ariston Sondqvist
- Frank Gatliff as Dr. Pitt-Norton
- Michael Gover as One Six
- Alan Haywood as Jackson
- Makki Marseilles as Andreas Stephanopoulus
- Norman Johns as Ship's 1st Officer
