= Heads and Tails (TV series) =

1977 British children's television series

- Created by: Michael Cole
- Starring: Derek Griffiths
- Country of origin: United Kingdom
- No. of episodes: 13

Production
- Running time: 15'00

Original release
- Network: BBC

Heads and Tails is a British television children's programme written and produced by Michael Cole with voices and music by Derek Griffiths. The fifteen-minute programme designed for pre-school children, featured archive and specially shot footage of domestic and wild animals. The narration was interspersed with comical conversations between animals and songs, often referring to certain animal characteristics in humorous ways, such as the nose of the proboscis monkey. The programme was first aired on BBC in 1977 with a second series in 1979. In 1980 a vinyl LP was realised with songs written by Cole and performed by Derek Griffiths.

Cole and Griffiths had previously worked together on Play School and Bod.

== Heads and Tails Vinyl LP ==
Released in 1980 by BBC records, with lyrics by Michael Cole and music by Derek Griffiths

Side 1 - Dog-a-Long

01 Heads and Tails / Wag-a-Lot / Dog-a-Long

02 Ladybird / Ants / Butterflies

03 Foxtrot Territory

04 Pigs On the Trot / Wallowing Good

05 Silence Too Has a Tale to Tell

06 Diving Ducks

07 Clumsy Swan

08 Gulls

09 Dig In Quick

Side 2 - The World Over

10 Life Gets Everywhere

11 Too Hot to Handle / Hey Mum!

12 The World Over

13 Run Cheetah Run

14 Coat of Many Colours

15 Proboscis Monkeys / Colobus Monkey

16 Home Is a Hole

17 Get Up and Go
