= Joanne Cole =

British artist and illustrator

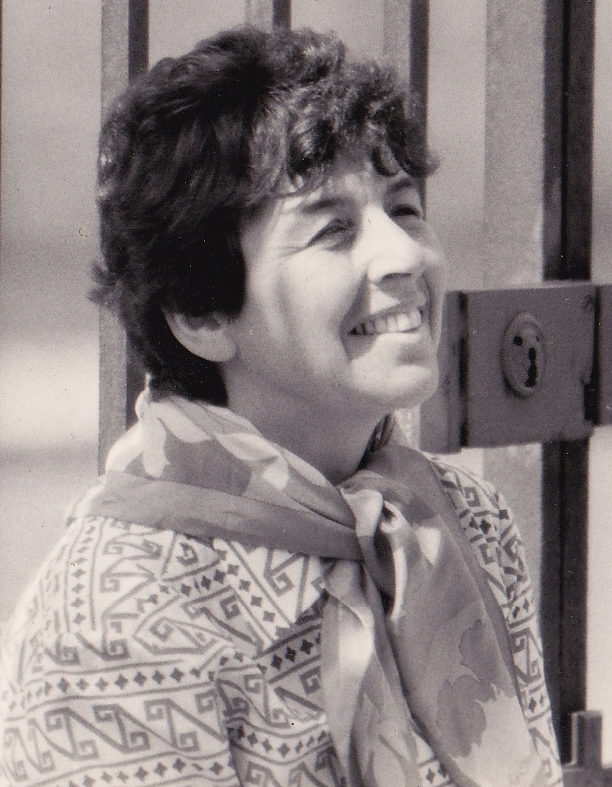
- Born: 6 June 1934
- Died: 7 August 1985 (aged 51)
- Occupation: Artist / Illustrator
- Spouse: Michael Cole (1955-1985)
- Children: 4
- Writing career
- Genres: Children's books and TV
- Notable works: Bod, Fingerbobs, Gran

Joanne Cole (6 June 1934 – 7 August 1985) was a British artist and illustrator. She most notably produced numerous children's books in the 1960s through to the 1980s. She also created artwork and puppets for British TV children's programmes. Together with husband Michael Cole they created Bod.

Bod originally appeared as four books, published in the UK by Methuen in 1965 and later released in France and the United States. The Coles collaborated on other children books including Wet Albert (1967) about a boy followed around by a rain cloud with crayon drawings by Cole and a series of four Kate and Sam books (1971) about the over-imaginative ideas of a young brother and sister. She also illustrated seven Jill Tomlinson books, including The Owl Who Was Afraid of the Dark (1973).

In 1972 the Coles created the children's BBC TV show Fingerbobs, starring Rick Jones and the finger-puppet adventures of a paper mouse and his friends, made by Cole. In 1973 Cole created puppets and artwork for BBC children's programme Ragtime, which won a Society of Film and Television Award (later known as a BAFTA) in 1973 for Best Children's Programme and was followed by a second series. In 1975 the original Bod books were developed into a BBC children's show. The Bod stories were made into 5 minute films animated by Alan Rogers, based on Cole's original drawings, narrated by John Le Mesurier and with music by Derek Griffiths. The rest of the programme, narrated by Maggie Henderson, was made up of Cole's illustrations with games such as Bod snap, songs and stories of Alberto Frog and his Amazing Animal Band. Bod was broadcast on BBC until 1984. It was also shown in Australia, New Zealand, the Netherlands, Sweden, Finland, Norway, Poland and Israel. In the United States, Bod aired on Nickelodeon as part of the Pinwheel program. The series of 13 episodes included nine new Bod adventures which were published as books in 1977 and illustrated by Cole.

In 1982 Cole co- wrote with her husband the BBC children's programme Gran. These tales of a most surprising grandmother, which were later developed into books illustrated by Cole, were animated by Ivor Wood and narrated by Patricia Hayes.

She also provided artwork regularly for ITV's Rainbow and BBC's Play School.

Cole died of cancer in 1985 aged 51 and in the same year Michael Cole wrote and produced Fingermouse, a musical version of Fingerbobs starring paper puppets made by Cole.

== Publications ==
- Bod's Apple 1965 Follett Pub. Co ISBN 0416233503
- Bod's Present 1965 Follett Pub. Co ASIN B0000CMRX0
- Bod's Dream 1965 Follett Pub. Co
- Bod and the Cherry Tree 1965 Follett Pub. Co
- Wet Albert 1967 Follett Publishing Co ASIN B0000CO53I
- Kate and Sam's Pet 1971 Metheun & Co. Ltd ISBN 0416153607
- Kate and Sam's Tea 1971 Metheun & Co. Ltd ISBN 0416153402
- Kate and Sam's New Home 1971 Metheun & Co. Ltd ISBN 0416804403
- Kate and Sam Go Out 1971 Metheun & Co. Ltd ISBN 0416804608
- The Baby and the Band 1973 Methuen young books ISBN 0416091709
- The Owl Who Was Afraid of the Dark, Jill Tomlinson 1973 Young Puffin Books ISBN 014030634X
- The Hen Who Wouldn't Give Up Jill Tomlinson 1977
- The Otter Who Wanted to Know Jill Tomlinson 1981
- The Gorilla Who Wanted to Grow Up Jill Tomlinson 1977
- The Aardvark Who Wasn't Sure Jill Tomlinson 1973
- Penguin's Progress Jill Tomlinson 1975
- The Cat Who Wanted to Go Home Jill Tomlinson 1972
- The Boot in the Field 1973 Methuen young books
- It's Ragtime 1976 BBC ISBN 0563170816
- Bod and Breakfast 1977 Methuen Publishing Ltd ISBN 0416561101
- Bod and the Dog 1977 Methuen Publishing Ltd ISBN 0416561403
- Bod and the Grasshopper 1977 Methuen Publishing Ltd ISBN 0416810705
- Bod and the Kite 1977 Methuen Publishing Ltd ISBN 0416810802
- Bod and the Beach 1977 Methuen Publishing Ltd ISBN 0416561209
- Bod and the Cake 1977 Methuen Publishing Ltd ISBN 0416561306
- Bod and the Birds 1977 Methuen Publishing Ltd ISBN 0416810608
- Bod and the Park 1977 Methuen Publishing Ltd ISBN 0416810500
- Bod and the Tiger 1977
- What is Red 1978
- All about me 1978
- Gran books 1985 ISBN 0216912806

== Television ==
- Bod
- Fingerbobs
- Gran
- Play School
- Rainbow
- Ragtime
- Fingermouse
