= Ludwig (1977 TV series) =

1977 British animated children's TV series

- The main Ludwig character
- Genre: Animated series
- Created by: Mirek and Peter Lang
- Starring: Jon Glover (voiceover)
- Music by: Ludwig van Beethoven
- Opening theme: Symphony No.5/Symphony No.1
- Country of origin: United Kingdom
- Original language: English
- No. of series: 1
- No. of episodes: 25

Production
- Running time: 5 minutes

Original release
- Network: BBC One
- Release: 20 June 1977

Ludwig is a surreal 1977 British-made children's animated television series featuring cutout animation, about a magical egg-shaped gemstone who lives in a forest. 25 five-minute episodes were made.

== Main character ==
The character's name came from Ludwig van Beethoven, whose music is played in the background. The series consisted of 25 five-minute episodes, in each of which something would happen to the animals of the forest and Ludwig would come to the rescue. His "body" facets would open up and out would pop arms, legs, gadgets or even a helicopter rotor when he needed to get somewhere fast. He was constantly watched by a human birdwatcher (voiced by Jon Glover) who had a deerstalker and large binoculars. This character was both the viewer's point of view and narrator, as no other character talked. Many of the musical phrases are the excerpts from Beethoven's Septet. At the end of every episode Ludwig played the final movement of Beethoven's first symphony through the credits.

== Production ==
The programme was produced by father and son team, Mirek and Peter Lang. The Langs were immigrants from Czechoslovakia; they left the country in 1968 in the aftermath of the Soviet invasion of Czechoslovakia, as Mirek's films criticized the Czechoslovak regime. After unsuccessful attempts to find work in British current affairs broadcasting, Mirek moved into animation work.

Collaborating with his son Peter, they produced Ludwig, shooting it on 16 mm film on a wind-up Bolex camera. Filming took place in their spare bedroom at their flat in Buckland Crescent, Swiss Cottage in London. The episodes were written by Jane Tann, Susan Kodicek, and Michael Cole. The music was arranged and played by Paul Reade. Jon Glover provided the voice of the birdwatcher. The Langs shared the animation.

Peter went on to animate Pigeon Street.

== Title music ==
The title music and opening theme of Ludwig is just 16 seconds long, and features first, a theme from the symphony No.5, followed by a small section of Beethoven's symphony No.1. It ends with the programme's narrator Jon Glover saying 'Ah, Ludwig' in an interested, well spoken manner.

== Broadcast in the United States ==
In the United States, Ludwig was one of the cartoons featured in Captain Kangaroo.

== List of episodes ==
1. "Arrival – Ludwig's here to stay"
2. "Hiccups"
3. "Hooter"
4. "Glue"
5. "Kites"
6. "Tennis"
7. "Sculptor"
8. "Skating"
9. "Umbrellas"
10. "Swing"
11. "Bubbles"
12. "Clock"
13. "Ball"
14. "Coin"
15. "Yo-Yo"
16. "Investigation - Research"
17. "Christmas"
18. "Home Sweet Home – Architect"
19. "Balloons"
20. "High Jump"
21. "Magician"
22. "Artist"
23. "Party"
24. "Nuts"
25. "TV - Western."

== Parody ==
In 2011 Charlie Brooker showed a short spoof of Ludwig, called Orlov, in the first part of his series How TV Ruined Your Life.
