= Bertha (TV series) =

British stop-motion animated television series (1985–1986)

- DVD cover for The Best Machine Competition
- Created by: Eric Charles; Stephen Flewers
- Starring: Roy Kinnear; Sheila Walker
- Narrated by: Roy Kinnear
- Theme music composer: Bryan Daly
- Country of origin: United Kingdom
- Original language: English
- No. of episodes: 13

Production
- Producer: Ivor Wood
- Running time: 15 minutes

Original release
- Network: BBC 1/BBC 2
- Release: 1 April 1985 – 18 June 1986

Bertha (stylised as 'bertha', ) is a 13-episode British stop motion-animated children's television series about a factory machine of that name that aired from 1985 to 1986. All the characters were designed by Ivor Wood, and the series was produced by his company, Woodland Animations. It was broadcast on BBC Television, It was intended as a replacement for the Postman Pat series and even replacing Gran along with being replaced by Charlie Chalk in 1988, until the second series aired in 1996.

A series of five storybooks based on Bertha was published by André Deutsch at the same time as the series was broadcast. They were adapted by Eric Charles and illustrated by Steve Augarde, who was also responsible for the artwork and music in the children's series Bump.

The series was later repeated on GMTV2 in the early 2000s along with Penny Crayon.

The series is available to watch on BritBox and Prime Video.

== Plot ==
The series is set in an industrial estate occupied by the Spottiswood & Company factory, a small manufacturing plant producing a wide range of goods ranging from cuckoo clocks to windmill money boxes. Each episode focuses on a machine called Bertha that can produce any item requested of her. In each episode, the factory experiences a crisis affecting its daily production schedule, which Bertha invariably solves with the help of her factory worker friends.

== Production ==
Bertha was created by Woodland Animations, who also produced the shows Postman Pat, Charlie Chalk and Gran for the BBC. Episodes were written by Eric Charles and Stephen Flewers, and designed, produced and directed by Ivor Wood, the studio's co-founder. Roy Kinnear and Sheila Walker voiced the characters, and Kinnear narrated. The main title music (as well as some of the other songs) feature the vocals of Guy Fletcher. The songs "Tracy's Robot Song", "Mrs Tupp" and "Isn't it Nice?" from the Bertha 12-inch vinyl record feature the vocals of Stephanie de Sykes.

== Main characters ==
- Mr. Willmake – The manager of the factory, which he inherited from his grandfather.
- Miss McClackerty – Mr. Willmake's secretary.
- Mr. Sprott – The chief designer.
- Tracy James – Mr. Sprott's assistant.
- Mr. Duncan – The Scottish accented works foreman. Sometimes, he is presented as the antagonist in the story, since he regards Bertha as an old inefficient machine.
- Ted Turner – The chief machine operator (who shows a number of influences of the late veteran TV presenter Bruce Forsyth).
- Roy Willing – The assistant machine operator (it was never stated if he was named after the series' narrator, Roy Kinnear).
- Mrs. Tupp – The tea lady, also responsible for first aid in the factory.
- Panjit Singh – The forklift truck operator, who often has accidents that are no fault of his own.
- Nell – The packer.
- Flo – The stacker.
- Bill and Horace - Two burglars who both resemble Ted Glen and Alf Thompson from Postman Pat.
- T.O.M. (Talk Operated Machine) – A robot resembling the Star Wars character R2-D2 designed by Tracy and built by Bertha to perform odd jobs around the factory. According to the song TOM the Robot from the episode TOM's New Friend and the Bertha 12" vinyl record, he is said to be Bertha's robot son.
- Bertha - The title character, an old machine at the factory who has been modernised over the 50 years she has worked at the factory. She helps the rest of the Spottiswood & Company factory during each episode in some way or another.

== Goods manufactured by Bertha throughout the series ==
In Numerical and Alphabetical Order:

- 365 springs
- Beach balls
- Building blocks
- Cuckoo clocks
- Garden gnomes
- Humming tops
- Inflatable plastic balloon bears
- Jack-in-the-boxes
- Jigsaw puzzles
- Jumping kangaroos
- A mechanical toy soldier for a contest
- Musical windmill money boxes
- Nuts and bolts
- Plastic bath sponges
- T.O.M. (Talk Operated Machine) – a robot and Bertha’s son
- Watering cans

== Episodes and broadcast dates ==
The first episode of Bertha premiered on BBC1 on 1 April 1985 at 3:55 pm after a 3:25 pm screening of Daffy Duck's Easter Show. Episodes 2-7 were shown over the following weeks, omitting the Easter and May Day holidays, and episodes 8–11 were first broadcast at the end of an Autumn rerun. The BBC did not comply with an ordered schedule for the airing of the programme, and the last two episodes premiered in 1986 during a repeat season at 1:45 pm and 1:30 pm. The series was regularly repeated on both BBC1 and BBC Two until 1998.

=== List of episodes ===
#	Title	Broadcast date	Product(s) produced	Song	Summary
1	The Great Painting Job	4 February 1985 (production); 1 April 1985 (TV)	Jigsaw puzzles and T.O.M.	Tracy's Robot Song	Tracy designs a robot called T.O.M. (Talk Operated Machine) to help out and today everyone in the factory is pleased.
2	The Windmills	11 February 1985 (production); 15 April 1985 (TV)	Musical windmill money boxes	N/A	Mr Sprott's money boxes are working well, but how do you get the coin out?
3	Mouse in the Works	18 February 1985 (production); 22 April 1985 (TV)	Jack-in-the-boxes and Mouse house	N/A	Panjit and the rest of the factory discover that all the cardboard boxes have been nibbled by a mouse and Bertha is programmed to capture the intruder.
4	The Best Machine Competition	25 February 1985 (production); 29 April 1985 (TV)	Humming tops and Mechanical toy soldier	Packing And Stacking	When Mr Willmake wants Mr Sprott to design the best toy for a competition, Mr Duncan wants it to be made by a new machine but everyone else wants it to be made by Bertha. Bertha proves she is still the best machine for any job.
5	T.O.M. Gets Lost	4 March 1985 (production); 13 May 1985 (TV)	Building blocks in various shapes and sizes	N/A	T.O.M. the Robot causes confusion when a magnet upsets his circuitry, so he scares the rest of the Spottiswood factory by disappearing.
6	The Flying Bear	11 March 1985 (production); 20 May 1985 (TV)	Inflatable plastic bears	N/A	On a very hot day, Bertha is making plastic bears. Why do they keep growing?
7	The Tea Nurse	18 March 1985 (production); 3 June 1985 (TV)	Watering cans	Mrs Tupp	Bertha has a faulty lever but Mrs Tupp comes to the rescue.
8	More Speed, Less Work	25 March 1985 (production); 5 November 1985 (TV)	Garden gnomes	N/A	While Mr Willmake and Mr Sprott are at a meeting, Mr Duncan does a time and motion study and closes down Bertha while she is making garden gnomes and special gnome for Panjid and Four protesters organise a protest to protest against shutting down Bertha.
9	The Big Order	1 April 1985 (production); 12 November 1985 (TV)	Nuts and Bolts followed by Springs	Roy The Apprentice	Bertha has to make 365 springs but T.O.M. and Roy have trouble with the whippy, twanging, springy steel.
10	The Burglars	8 April 1985 (production); 19 November 1985 (TV)	Jumping kangaroos followed by a Kangaroo shaped sack containing stolen money	N/A	Two burglars break into the factory and try to steal money for the wages. However T.O.M. and Bertha manage to stop the burglars with thanks to a jumping kangaroo.
11	Bertha's Birthday Party	15 April 1985 (production); 26 November 1985 (TV)	Cuckoo clocks	N/A	On the day before Bertha's 50th anniversary, Roy wonders why the hands on a clock are called hands. Meanwhile Miss McClackerty finds some old papers about Bertha being 50 years old tomorrow, so Mr. Willmake decides to celebrate Bertha's birthday by giving her the day off. Bertha is busy making cuckoo clocks when Miss McClackerty decides that it's time for a birthday celebration.
12	The Big Sneeze	22 April 1985 (production); 16 April 1986 (TV)	Beach balls and Giant Snowballs followed by a Beach ball in an Ice block	N/A	It's a very cold day and Bertha and Miss McClackerty catch a terrible cold, and because of that, the beach balls go wrong.
13	Tom's New Friend	29 April 1985 (production); 18 June 1986 (TV)	Plastic bath sponges	T.O.M. The Robot	Mrs Tupp is cross about a new vending machine that is delivered but T.O.M. thinks it is a friend. He soon fixes it.

== Merchandise ==
Merchandise for the programme was, and is, very minimal. The merchandise listed are the only items that have been discovered.

=== UK VHS and DVD releases ===
On 13 July 1987, after the episodes were shown on TV, the BBC released one video of the show.

VHS video title	Year of release	Episodes
Bertha - The Flying Bear (BBCV 4075)	13 July 1987	"A Mouse in the Works"; "T.O.M. Gets Lost"; "The Flying Bear"; "The Burglars"

At some point in 1985, Bertha was featured on a Marks and Spencer (St. Michael) exclusive VHS release called Cartoon Favourites along with The Family-Ness, Ivor the Engine, Bagpuss and Pigeon Street. The "Mouse in the Works" episode of Bertha is on this release.

On 27 November 1989, one episode of Bertha was on a VHS release which was exclusive to W.H. Smith stores, Postman Pat and Friends alongside Postman Pat and Charlie Chalk.

VHS video title	Year of release	Episodes
Postman Pat and Friends (WHS 4301)	27 November 1989	Postman Pat - "Pat Goes Sledging", Charlie Chalk - "Arnold's Night Out", Bertha - "The Flying Bear"

On 11 November 1991, one episode of Bertha was featured on the BBC VHS release Postman Pat and Company alongside Postman Pat and Charlie Chalk.

VHS video title	Year of release	Episodes
Postman Pat and Company (BBCV 4709)	11 November 1991	Postman Pat - "Pat's Foggy Day", Charlie Chalk - "Edward Keeps Fit", Postman Pat - "Letters on Ice", Bertha - "The Burglars"

Hallmark and Carlton Home Entertainment released the first four episodes on a single video in 1994.

VHS video title	Year of release	Episodes
Bertha (3007340123)	6 June 1994	"The Great Painting Job"; "The Windmills"; "A Mouse in the Works"; "The Best Machine Competition"

In 2004 Entertainment Rights released a DVD of the show containing three of the same episodes as the Hallmark/Carlton Release, replacing "The Best Machine Competition" with "More Speed, Less Work" (albeit mistitled "The Best Machine competition").

DVD title	Year of release	Episodes
Bertha and the Best Machine Competition	13 July 2004	"The Great Painting Job", "The Windmills", "A Mouse in the Works", "More Speed, Less Work"

In 2011, Classic Media released a DVD entitled Fun with Friends: Volume One containing one episode of Bertha.

DVD title	Year of release	Episodes
Fun with Friends: Volume One	27 June 2011	Postman Pat - "Ice Cream Machine", Bertha - "The Flying Bear", Ethelbert the Tiger - "Ethelbert and the Camel", Friendly Monsters - "A Monster Holiday", Fun Song Factory - "Happy", Little Red Tractor - "Circles in the Corn", Merlin the Magical Puppy - "Merlin and the Summer Fair", Postman Pat - "Postman Pat at the Seaside", Preston Pig - "Snout Scouts"

=== Australian DVD releases ===
While there are no known Australian VHS releases of the programme, two DVDs of the entire series have been released by Reel Entertainment. The DVD cover claimed that the show was made by "the makers of Postman Pat and Thomas and Friends." However, this is only true for Charlie Chalk (since the slogan was used on all the Woodland Animations DVDs in Australia), because Jocelyn Stevenson (writer of Charlie Chalk) became the executive producer on Thomas and Friends from the seventh series (2003) to the tenth series (2006).

=== Photobooks ===
In 1985, to accompany the programme, some photobooks were released with altered titles to fit the style of the books. These were very similar to the Postman Pat photobooks, where the front cover would be an original illustration and all pictures within the book were images from the TV programme.

- Bertha and the Great Painting Job (The Great Painting Job)
- Bertha and the Windmills (The Windmills)
- Bertha and the Mouse in the Works (A Mouse in the works)
- Bertha and the Best Machine Competition (The Best Machine Competition)
- Bertha and the Lost TOM (T.O.M. Gets Lost)
- Bertha and the Flying Bear (The Flying Bear)

=== Vinyl record ===
In 1986, after broadcast ended, the BBC's record label released a 12" vinyl record containing songs from the TV series.

All tracks are written by Bryan Daly.

Side 1
No.	Title	Vocals	Length
1.	"Bertha"	Guy Fletcher
2.	"Mrs. Tupp"	Stefanie De Sykes
3.	"Packing and Stacking"	Guy Fletcher, Eva Burden
4.	"The Flying Bear" (*) (instrumental)
5.	"Mr. Duncan" (*)	Bryan Daly
6.	"Turning Wheels" (*) (instrumental)

Side 2
No.	Title	Vocals	Length
1.	"T.O.M. the Robot"	Guy Fletcher
2.	"Isn't it Nice?" (*)	Stefanie De Sykes
3.	"Mr. Willmake" (*)	Guy Fletcher, Stefanie De Sykes
4.	"Tracy's Robot Song"	Stefanie De Sykes
5.	"Spottiswood March" ((*) (instrumental))
6.	"Roy the Apprentice"	Guy Fletcher

Tracks marked with an asterisk (*) did not feature in the TV series. However, it is possible that the song "Mr. Duncan" was to feature in the episode "More Speed, Less Work" but was not included due to it making the episode too long. The same is the case with "Mr. Willmake" possibly featuring in the episode "Bertha's Birthday Party".

The album also had a cassette release with the reference number of ZCR 585.

=== Board game ===
In 1987, Falcon released a board game using illustrations similar to those seen on the front covers of the photobooks. The game itself does not differ much from the Monopoly series of board games. If a player lands on T.O.M., they are allowed to ask Bertha to make an item for them.

=== Advent calendar ===
In 1985, an Advent calendar using the same profile image as the vinyl record was released.

=== Annuals ===
From 1985 to 1988, Bertha featured in a total of four hardback annuals:

- Bertha Annual 1985
- Bertha Annual 1986
- Buttons (based on Children's BBC) Annual 1987 (along with Postman Pat, King Rollo, Towser, Henry's Cat and Jimbo and the Jet Set)
- Buttons Annual 1988 (along with Postman Pat, Charlie Chalk, Henry's Cat, Towser, King Rollo and Spot)

== Credits ==
- Written by: Eric Charles
- Narration by: Roy Kinnear
- Voices by: Roy Kinnear and Sheila Walker
- Music and lyrics by: Bryan Daly
- Director of animation: Derek Mogford
- Series designed and directed by: Ivor Wood
- Film editor: Martin Bohan
- Song vocals: Guy Fletcher
- Recorded at: Havoc House Studios
- Sound by: Clive Pendry
- Produced by: Woodland Animations Ltd
- © Woodland Animations Ltd MCMLXXXV
