= Terk =

Terk may refer to:

- Sonia Terk (1885–1979), Ukrainian-born French artist
- Terk (musician), former member of Whistle (band)
- Terk v. Gordon, a 1978 United States Supreme Court case
- Terk, a brand owned by Voxx International
- Terk, local name for the Terek River, in the northern Caucasus mountains
- Terk (Terkina), a character in the 1999 film Tarzan

== See also ==
- Star Terk II, 1980s British radio show
- Turk (disambiguation)
