= Bric-a-Brac =

British children's television series

- Created by: Michael Cole and Nick Wilson
- Starring: Brian Cant
- Country of origin: United Kingdom

Production
- Producers: Michael Cole, Cynthia Felgate and Nick Wilson

Original release
- Network: BBC1 (1980 – 1982)
- Release: 1 October 1980 – 29 September 1982

Bric-a-Brac is a British children's television series devised by Michael Cole and Nick Wilson, and starring well known children's television presenter Brian Cant. It was produced by the BBC and originally ran from 1 October until 5 November 1980, with another series from 18 August to 29 September 1982. It was repeated frequently until 1989.

The programme was set in a fictitious junk shop, with its shopkeeper played by Cant, who would deliver a monologue to camera. Each episode centred on a particular letter of the alphabet, with different items beginning with that letter found and discussed by the shopkeeper. Cant's script made heavy use of alliteration, and made use of tongue-twisters. At the end of each episode, he would wind up and set off a traditional clockwork toy, upon which the camera would focus whilst the credits rolled.

== Theme music ==
The theme music is an edited version of the track "Keystone Capers 2" by Eric Peters from the KPM LP Electrosonic (1972).
