= Ragtime (TV series) =

British children's TV series (1973–1975)

- Genre: Children's television series
- Created by: Michael Cole
- Presented by: Fred Harris; Maggie Henderson
- Theme music composer: Peter Gosling and Michael Cole
- Country of origin: United Kingdom
- Original language: English
- No. of seasons: 2
- No. of episodes: 26

Production
- Executive producer: Cynthia Felgate
- Running time: 14 minutes

Original release
- Network: BBC1
- Release: 3 October 1973 – 16 March 1975

Ragtime is a children's television series created by Michael Cole and presented by Maggie Henderson and Fred Harris. The programme features play with words, songs, stories and puppets. Puppets made by Joanne Cole emerge from the green Ragtime Bag, including wooden spoons with faces drawn on them. These are named Mr Porridge, Mr Curry, Mr Jelly, Miss Sponge, Mrs Custard, Uncle Casserole and Mrs Ragamuffin. Other puppet regulars include Dax and Sniff (both dogs), Humbug the tiger and Bubble, a cushion-shaped toy.

The music was provided by Peter Gosling and Dave Moses.

In 1973 the series won a Society of Film and Television Award (later known as a BAFTA) for Best Children's Programme.

Although a book and record were produced at the time, no episodes are currently available on DVD. Although regularly repeated until 1980, only eight of the twenty six episodes remain in the BBC's archive, due to a decision in the early 1990s to wipe the master tapes of many 1970s children's programmes .
