= Man in the Mirror (The Avengers) =

- The Avengers episode
- Episode no.: Season 2 Episode 22
- Directed by: Kim Mills
- Written by: Geoffrey Orme; Anthony Terpiloff
- Production code: 3521
- Original air date: 22 February 1963

Guest appearances
- Daphne Anderson; Ray Barrett; Julian Somers; Rhoda Lewis; Haydn Jones; Michael Gover

Episode chronology
← Previous "The White Dwarf"	Next → "Conspiracy of Silence"

"Man in the Mirror" is the twenty-second episode of the second series of the 1960s cult British spy-fi television series The Avengers, starring Patrick Macnee and Julie Stevens. It was first broadcast in the Teledu Cymru region of the ITV network on Friday 22 February 1963. ABC Weekend TV, who produced the show for ITV, broadcast it the next day in its own regions. The episode was directed by Kim Mills and written by Geoffrey Orme and Anthony Terpiloff.

== Plot ==
A cipher expert commits suicide at an amusement park, however Steed discovers that Venus Smith had taken a photograph that shows the man reflected in the mirror in the amusement part several days later, apparently very much alive. Steed investigates the mystery.

== Music ==
Julie Stevens sings There's Nothin' Like Love from the film My Sister Eileen and I Know Where I'm Going from I Know Where I'm Going!

== Cast ==
- Patrick Macnee as John Steed
- Julie Stevens as Venus Smith
- Daphne Anderson as Betty Brown
- Ray Barrett as Strong
- Julian Somers as Mike Brown
- Rhoda Lewis as Jean Trevelyan
- Haydn Jones as Victor Trevelyan
- Michael Gover as One Six
- David Graham as Peter the Producer
- Freda Knorr as Iris
