= Fingerbobs =

1972 British TV children's series

- Genre: Live-action/Puppet TV series
- Created by: Joanne Cole; Michael Cole
- Presented by: Rick Jones Adam Watherston
- Theme music composer: Michael Jessett
- Country of origin: United Kingdom
- Original language: English
- No. of seasons: 1
- No. of episodes: 13

Production
- Producer: Q3 London
- Running time: 15 minutes

Original release
- Network: BBC1
- Release: 14 February – 15 May 1972

Related
- Fingermouse

Fingerbobs is a British children's television programme made by Q3 for the BBC.

== Programme ==
The first episode was broadcast on 14 February 1972 on BBC1 as part of Watch with Mother. The show was created by Joanne and Michael Cole, who also created Bod. Only thirteen episodes were ever made and were regularly repeated until December 1984.

Presented by mime artist "Yoffy" (played by Canadian actor Rick Jones), each ten-minute episode told a story centred on a paper finger puppet animal and usually involved collecting various items (such as pebbles or feathers) to make up another object at the end. The finger puppets, each of whom had their own song, included:

- Fingermouse – a mouse, consisting of a grey paper cone head with paper ears and whiskers with a grey glove for the body ("Fingermouse, Fingermouse/I am a sort of wondermouse"). Fingermouse later got his own show, with a new puppeteer, Play School's Iain Lauchlan, called "The Music Man". The Music Man would tell stories involving Fingermouse, using musical instruments.
- Gulliver – a seagull made from a white ping-pong ball (head) placed over a thumb and white gloves forming the body with outstretched fingers as the wings. ("I spread my wings.")
- Scampi – several scampi were made using purple gloves with red heads on each finger
- Flash – a tortoise with a paper shell. ("Slowly, steadily, I move at my own pace/They call me Flash though I won't dash/Who wants to run a race?")

Other animal characters included Enoch the woodpecker, Scaredy the crow, Louise the squirrel, Prickly Friend the hedgehog and Gloria, a white mouse who appeared in the last edition as a girlfriend for Fingermouse. These creatures only made occasional appearances and did not have their own songs.

Fingermouse gained his own series in 1985. In this series, the focus was more on musical instruments. One series was made of thirteen programmes.

After filming the last episode, Jones destroyed the mouse puppet while the camera was still rolling.

== Episodes ==
No.	Title	First broadcast
1	"Bumpy"	14 February 1972
2	"Stones"	21 February 1972
3	"Feathers"	28 February 1972
4	"Sounds"	6 March 1972
5	"Wood"	13 March 1972
6	"Shiny"	20 March 1972
7	"String"	27 March 1972
8	"Shadows"	10 April 1972
9	"Shapes"	17 April 1972
10	"Bricks"	24 April 1972
11	"Paint"	1 May 1972
12	"Seeds"	8 May 1972
13	"House"	15 May 1972

Note: Episode titles were given in Radio Times, but were not shown on-screen.

== Music ==
The memorable theme tune, composed by Michael Jessett, went "Yoffy lifts a finger, and a mouse is there/Puts his hands together, and a seagull takes the air/Yoffy lifts a finger, and a scampi darts about/Yoffy bends another, and a tortoise head peeps out/These hands were made for making, and making they must do."

== Legacy ==
Fingerbobs is referenced in the video for "A Town Called Hypocrisy" by Lostprophets.

== Home media ==
The series was released on DVD under the title The Complete Fingerbobs, published by Contender Home Entertainment under its Kult Kidz label in 2001.
