= Chock-A-Block =

1981 British children's TV programme

- Genre: Children's
- Created by: Michael Cole
- Presented by: Carol Leader; Fred Harris
- Theme music composer: Peter Gosling
- Country of origin: United Kingdom
- Original language: English
- No. of series: 1
- No. of episodes: 13

Production
- Executive producer: Cynthia Felgate
- Producer: Michael Cole

Original release
- Network: BBC1
- Release: 21 May – 13 August 1981

Chock-A-Block is a BBC children's television programme, created by Michael Cole and Nick Wilson. It was first shown in 1981 and repeated through to 1989 and shown as part of the children's programme cycle See-Saw (the "new" name for the cycle originally known as Watch with Mother). "Chock-A-Block" was an extremely large yellow computer, modelled to resemble a mainframe of the time; it filled the entire studio and provided the entire backdrop for the show. The presenter of the show played the part of a technician maintaining the computer. There were two presenters, Fred Harris ("Chock-A-Bloke") and Carol Leader ("Chock-A-Girl"), but only one appeared in each episode. At the start of the show, the presenter would drive around the studio towards the machine in a small yellow electric car, the chock a truck, before saying the catchphrase "Chock-A-Bloke (or Girl), checking in!").

The presenter would then use the machine to find out about a particular topic. The name "chock-a-block" was derived from the machine's ability to read data from "blocks" – which were just that, physical blocks painted different colours. A typical show would include dialogue from the presenter, a brief clip played on Chock-a-Block's video screen, and the presenter recording a song on Chock-a-Block's audio recorder (which resembled the reel-to-reel tape drives used on actual mainframes, but with a design below to cause the reels to resemble the eyes of a smiling face). In most episodes, Chock-a-Block would malfunction at least once by failing to respond to commands (a "Chock-a-Blockage") which had the presenter frantically pressing its buttons until it stopped.

The presenter Fred Harris went on to present the serious computing programme Micro Live and to become a personality strongly associated with computers in the public eye.

According to the Kaleidoscope 'Lost Shows' database, eight out of thirteen episodes are no longer in the BBC archives, however all other episodes bar "Magpie" exist on domestic video recordings, with "Shoe" existing only partially.

== Episodes ==
No.	Title	Presenter	Original release date	Catalogue no.
1	"Clock"	Fred Harris	21 May 1981	LCHS566P
Featured the song "The Clock That Lost Its Tock".
2	"Crow"	Carol Leader.	28 May 1981	LCHS573Y
Featured the song "Ballad of Joe Crow".
3	"The Sheep"	Fred Harris	4 June 1981	LCHS567J
4	"The Train"	Carol Leader	11 June 1981	LCHS574S
5	"The Sun and The Moon"	Fred Harris	18 June 1981	LCHS568D
Featured the song "Out Shone a Ray".
6	"Magpie"	Carol Leader	25 June 1981	LCHS575L
7	"Cole"	Fred Harris	2 July 1981	LCHS569X
Featured the song "King Cole's Mole"
8	"Cat"	Carol Leader	9 July 1981	LCHS576F
9	"Pig"	Fred Harris	16 July 1981	LCHS570R
Featured the song "The Dancing Pig"
10	"Shoe"	Carol Leader	23 July 1981	LCHS577A
11	"Snake"	Fred Harris	30 July 1981	LCHS571K
Featured the song "Drake on the Lake"
12	"Bee at the Sea"	Carol Leader	6 August 1981	LCHS578T
Featured the poem "If All the Seas Were One Sea".
13	"Bear"	Fred Harris	13 August 1981	LCHS572E
Featured the poem "Pussy Cat, Pussy Cat, Where Have You Been?"
