= Conspiracy of silence =

Conspiracy of silence may refer to:

- Conspiracy of silence (expression), an expression
- Conspiracy of Silence, a 1951 book, by Alexander Weissberg-Cybulski, also known later as The Accused
- Conspiracy of Silence (The Avengers), an episode of the 1960s espionage series
- Conspiracy of Silence, a 1989 non-fiction novel by Lisa Priest about the murder of Helen Betty Osborne
- Conspiracy of Silence (1991 film), a Canadian television film
- Conspiracy of Silence, a 1994 produced, unreleased documentary film about the Franklin child prostitution ring allegations
- The Conspiracy of Silence, a 1995 documentary film about domestic violence
- Conspiracy of Silence (2003 film), a 2003 film about Roman Catholic clergy in Ireland
- Conspiracy of Silence, a 2012 eBook in the Space: 1889 & Beyond series, by Andy Frankham-Allen and Frank Chadwick

== See also ==
- Cultures of silence
