= Julian Somers =

English actor (1903–1976)

John Julian Somers (12 November 1903 – 11 November 1976), known as Julian Somers, was a prolific English stage and screen actor.

== Career ==
By 1934, Somers was appearing in rep at Croydon. In 1937, he was on stage in Jeffrey Dell's play Night Alone at the Embassy Theatre with Alexander Archdale. In 1944, he appeared as the White Rabbit in a stage production of Alice in Wonderland.

Early film roles came in The Peterville Diamond (1942) and Caravan (1946). Outside his developing screen career as a supporting actor, Somers continued to be heard in BBC radio productions and to appear in West End theatre plays and reviews. In 1952 he appeared in the West End in Raymond Massey's Hanging Judge.

== Private life ==
In October 1939, Somers was living with his mother, Ethel M. Somers, at Wolnoth, Park Lane, Leatherhead, and was registered as an actor. In the summer of 1950, he married Betty Margaret Newcombe at Finsbury. They had three sons and a daughter.

== Death ==
Somers died in London in 1976, aged 72. At the time of his death, he was living at 33, Wharton Street, Clerkenwell. He was cremated at Islington.

== Filmography ==
=== Film ===
- The Peterville Diamond (1942) as Andre
- Caravan (1946) as Manoel
- The Small Back Room (1949) as Dr Bryan
- Diamond City (1949) as van Niekerk
- Hunted (1952) as Jack Lloyd
- The Gambler and the Lady (1952) as Licasi
- The Story of Robin Hood and His Merrie Men (1952) as Posse leader
- Three Steps to the Gallows (1953) as John Durante
- The Long Memory (1953) as Delaney
- Fatal Journey (1954) as Goff
- The Battle of the River Plate (1956) as Quartermaster of Graf Spee
- The Moonraker (1957) as Captain Foster
- The One That Got Away (1957) as Railway Booking Clerk
- Time Without Pity (1957) as First Warder
- Battle of the V-1 (1957) as Reichsfuehrer
- Miracle in Soho (1957) as Potter
- A Night to Remember (1958) as Bull
- Another Time, Another Place (1958) as Hotel Manager
- Room at the Top (1959) as St Clair
- The Giant Behemoth (1959) as Rear Admiral Summers
- Sink the Bismarck! (1960) as Civilian on HMS Prince of Wales
- Reluctant Bandit (1965)
- Far from the Madding Crowd (1967) as Jan Coggan
- The Snow Goose (1971) as Jim

=== Television ===
- Saturday Playhouse: episode "Britannia of Billingsgate" (1958) as Brizzi
- The Adventures of Robin Hood: episode “The Crusaders” (1958) as Sir Paul
- Armchair Theatre: episode "Hanging Judge" (1958) as Ronald Pond
- Television Playwright: episode "The Brittle Bond" (1958) as Young
- The Invisible Man: episode “Blind Justice” (1958) as Simmons
- The Avengers: episode "Man in the Mirror" (1963) as Mike Brown
- Coronation Street (1963) as Ministry of Pensions Supervisor
- Moonstrike: episode "The Bells Are Silent" (1963) as Major Richter
- Gideon's Way: episode “The Great Plane Robbery” (1965) as Cameron
- ITV Play of the Week: episode The Winds of Green Monday (1965) as Bosun Brien
- Object Z (1965) as the Prime Minister Sir John Chandos
- Thursday Theatre: episode “Celebration” (1965) as Arthur Broadbent
- The Newcomers (1967-1969) as William Pargeter
- Crossroads (1970) as Mr. Sinclair
- ...And Mother Makes Five (1974-1975) as Mr. Turnbull
- Churchill's People: episode “A Wilderness of Roses” (1975) as John Mauteby
