= Yvonne Shima =

British actress (1935–2023)

- Born: 1935; British Columbia, Canada
- Died: 1 September 2023 (age 88); British Columbia, Canada
- Occupations: Actress, Singer
- Years active: 1958–1965
- Spouse: Barry Ransom

Yvonne Shima (1935 – 1 September 2023) was a Canadian-born British actress.

== Life and career ==
Shima was born in British Columbia into a Japanese Canadian family and later settled in Toronto. Soon after arriving in the UK in 1958 she began playing the role of Lotus Blossom in the play The Teahouse of the August Moon on stage. She played the receptionist Sister Lily in the first James Bond film Dr. No in 1962. In the late 1960s, Yvonne decided to stop acting after suffering a car accident.

== Filmography ==
=== Film ===
Year	Title	Role	Notes	ref
1960	The Savage Innocents	Lulik		
1960	The World of Suzie Wong	Minnie Ho		
1960	Passport to China	Liong Ti	Uncredited	
1961	The Sinister Man	Tamaya		
1962	The Road to Hong Kong	Poon Soon		
1962	Dr. No	Sister Lily		
1963	The Cool Mikado	Peep-Bo		
1965	Genghis Khan	Concubine		

=== Television ===
Year	Title	Role	Notes	ref
1958	Television Playwright		Episode: "The Commentator"	
1958	Armchair Theatre	Fujiko Maki	Episode: "The Deaf Heart"	
1963	The Avengers	Anna	Episode: "A Chorus of Frogs"	
