= Carol Leader =

British actress and psychotherapist

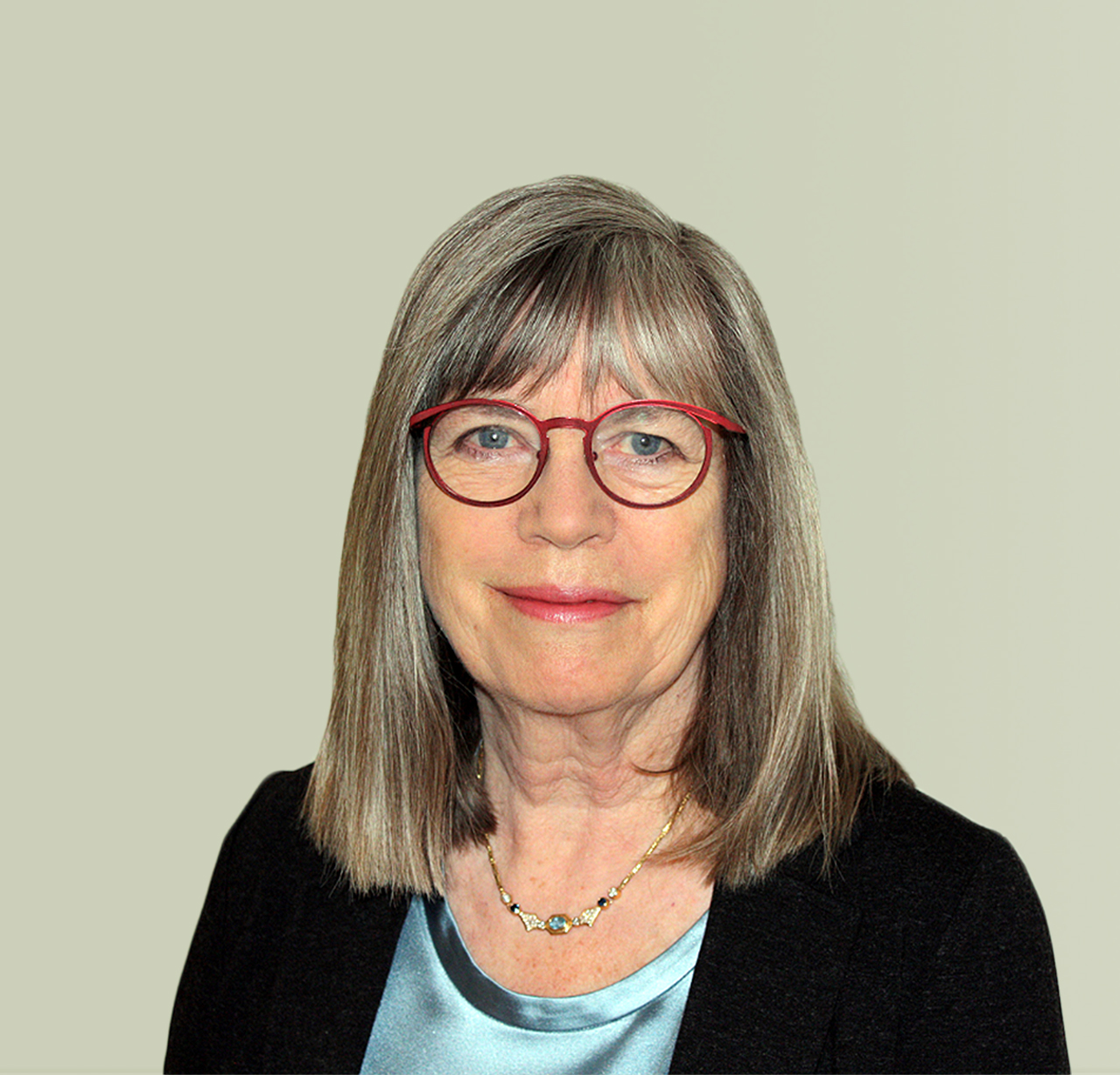
- Born: Carol Elizabeth Leader; 10 November 1950 (age 75); Colchester, Essex, England
- Occupations: Jungian psychoanalyst; Psychoanalytic psychotherapist; Lecturer and seminar leader; Published Writer; Former Theatre and TV actress; TV and radio presenter
- Years active: 1974-present
- Spouse: Michael Maynard
- Children: 1
- Website: www.carolleader.com

Carol Elizabeth Leader (born 10 November 1950) is an English Jungian psychoanalyst and psychoanalytic psychotherapist and a former theatrical and television actress.

Leader's acting career began at the University of York where she studied History and feature in drama productions, including the role of Charlotte Corday in Y.U.D.S. Marat-Sade production in 1971.

Despite a successful stage and television career, Leader eventually quit acting and retrained as a psychoanalytic psychotherapist in London. She also works as an organisational consultant.

== Childhood and early career 1950 – 1974 ==
Leader was born in Colchester on 10 November 1950 and spent her early years in Wivenhoe, Essex before her family settled in Leicestershire. She lived on Saltersgate Drive in Birstall, Leicestershire.

She was a member of the Leicestershire Schools Symphony Orchestra during her teenage years and appeared regularly on BBC Radio Leicester as a singer/songwriter. She was part of a group of sixth formers from Longslade Grammar School, who took a revue to the Edinburgh Fringe (1967). She read Modern and Medieval History at York University. While at York University she appeared in numerous drama productions, including the roles of Charlotte Corday in Y.U.D.S Marat-Sade production in 1971. She also played Viola in Twelfth Night and Amanda in Private Lives at the arts theatre, York and performed in a Y.U.D.S. play and review at the Edinburgh Festival.

In 1972 she completed a Certificate in Education (Drama) at Bretton Hall College, Yorkshire where she was also a co-founder of the Perspectives theatre company employed by the Key Theatre in Peterborough in the same year, offering community and young people's outreach work. Today the company continues as an East Midland touring company under the name of New Perspectives.

== Early career ==
She played Barbara Charlton in Young at Heart from 1980 to 1981, and Sadie Tomkins in Casualty in 1988 and has also been in Flambards, Sally Ann, First and Last (1989), Peak Practice and 1992 TV series Kevin and Co. She has also appeared in UK television series including Late Starter, Tales of the Unexpected, The Bill and The Knock. During the 1970s and 1980s she was a presenter of long-running UK children's TV series Play School, and children's TV show Chock-A-Block, co-presented with fellow former Play School host Fred Harris.

== Play School and Chock-A-Block 1974 – 1986 ==
Leader worked as a Perspectives player, writer and director in her early twenties before moving to London to become a regular presenter for BBC Children's TV Play School. She also presented the pre-school show Chock-A-Block in 1981, and co-presented and was a script writer for the series Introducing Science – a weekly half hour programme on science for BBC Schools Radio.

Leader also made an 'appearance' in Sue Townsend's The Secret Diary of Adrian Mole, Aged 13¾: "Friday June 26th: Doctor said our thermometer is faulty. I feel slightly better. Got up for twenty minutes today. Watched Play School; it was Carol Leader's turn, she is my favourite presenter".

== Theatre and TV drama 1975 - 1994 ==
During these years Leader pursued a career as a stage and TV actress. Extensive theatre credits include leading or major toles in The Rivals and the premier of Arnold Wesker's Wedding Feast both at Leeds Playhouse; Kate Hardcastle in She Stoops to Conquer at Birmingham Repertory Theatre; Funny Peculiar at the Churchill Theatre, Bromley; Absent Friends, Breezeblock Park and Julie in Talent at the Little Theatre, Bristol; Whale Music at the New End Theatre in Hampstead; To Come Home to This and Bazaar and Rummage at the Royal Court Theatre; Ibis in the premiere of Jonathan Falla's award winning Topokana Martyrs Day at the Bush Theatre; Jane in Present Continuous at the Offstage Theatre, Chalk Farm; Hedda in Hedda Gabler and Maire in Translations, both at Theatre Clwyd and Women of Troy at The National Theatre.

Major television roles include Dorothy in Flambards for Yorkshire TV; Lt Mary Barker in Sally Ann for STV; Barbara in the two series of Young at Heart for ATV; Linda in Out of Step, a Playhouse drama for the BBC; Chrissie in Studio for Granada; Penny in Late Starter and Kate in Getting On, both for the BBC; Lucille in Honky Tonk Heroes for ATV and Mary in Happy Since I Met You for Granada and Sadie Tomkins in Casualty.

== Psychotherapist and Jungian psychoanalyst since 1990s to date ==
Following a successful stage and television career, Leader quit acting to further her growing interests in mental health and human development. In the 1990s she retrained as a psychoanalytic psychotherapist and later, as a Jungian psychoanalyst. She also worked as a consultant in business and the arts.

Today her time is spread between working in private practice and as a senior teaching Jungian analyst and supervisor and a senior psychoanalytic psychotherapist both with The British Psychotherapy Foundation, London. She is also a Fellow of the Neuropsychoanalysis Association. Leader offers workshops and gives lectures in person and on-line on a range of subjects related to human development, mental health, the arts, Jungian psychology and contemporary psychoanalysis. She was the 2014 professional winner, of the British Journal of Psychotherapy's Rosika Parker prize for her paper on William Blake and his relevance to clinical practice.

Some of Leader's talks have been posted on YouTube and a number of her papers can be viewed on the on-line research platform Academia.

== Family ==
Leader is married to Michael Maynard and they have one son.

== Memberships and Associations ==
- British Psychoanalytic Council – BPC
- British Psychotherapy Foundation – BPF
- Registered Supervisor – BAPPS
- Neuropsychoanalysis Association
- International Association for Analytical Psychology – IAAP
- Association for Group and Individual Psychotherapy – AGIP
- European Association for Psychotherapy – EAP
- Maynard Leigh Associates
