= The All Electric Amusement Arcade =

British children's television series

- Genre: Musical; Drama
- Created by: Gerard Macdonald
- Starring: Lorraine Brunning; Tim Whitnall; Steven Woodcock; Joanne Campbell; Heather Taylor; Michael Lee Osborn; Gordon Gostelow; Liz Smith
- Country of origin: United Kingdom
- Original language: English
- No. of series: 1
- No. of episodes: 7

Production
- Executive producer: Pamela Lonsdale
- Producer: Sheila Kinany
- Running time: 25 minutes
- Production company: Thames Television

Original release
- Network: ITV (CITV)
- Release: 14 September – 26 October 1983

The All Electric Amusement Arcade is a seven-part British children's television serial aired on ITV in 1983. The show is a musical drama, with nearly every episode featuring an original song performed by in-universe band Electric Arc.

The first episode of the series is available at the BFI Mediatheque at the BFI Southbank.

== Premise ==
Fifteen-year-old Bella Harper dreams of moving to Hollywood and becoming an actress. However, she is stuck in her hometown Graystone Beach with her broken family, so takes it upon herself to earn enough money to get her to her dream. She makes a deal with Mr Thomsett - manager of local dilapidated arcade The All Electric Amusement Arcade; if she can turn around the fortunes of the arcade, she earns 20% of the profits. With the help of local band Electric Arc, she decides to renovate the arcade into an events space for the youth of the town.

== Cast ==
=== Main ===
- Bella Harper (Lorraine Brunning)
- Jake (Tim Whitnall)
- Marcus (Steven Woodcock)
- Deshaun (Joanne Campbell)
- Cass (Heather Taylor)
- Dale (Michael Lee Osborn)
- Mr Thomsett (Gordon Gostelow)
- Robert Harper (David Collings)
- Susan Harper (Janet Dale)
- Gran (Liz Smith)
- Perry Harper (Alan Bowyer)

=== Minor ===
- Mrs Thomsett (Barbara Lott)
- Daffyd Williams (Tenniel Evans)
- Star Base (Heather Alexander)
- Mr McMorrow (Leo Dolan)
- Hawk (Clive Griffin)
- Councillor Hogan (Kenneth MacDonald)
- Councillor Warren (Joan Newell)
- Danny (Lee Towsey)

David Jensen also appears as himself.

== Episodes ==
No.	Title	Directed by	Original song	Original release date
1	"Episode 1"	Christopher Hodson	"Video Puppet"	14 September 1983
Local band Electric Arc are left without a venue - so after stumbling upon the dilapidated the All Electric Amusement Arcade, Bella decides to do something about it. Meanwhile, Truancy officer Daffyd Williams turns up at the Harper household for dinner, questioning why Bella has been skipping school. Electric Arc hold their first gig in their new home.
2	"Episode 2"	Christopher Hodson	None	21 September 1983
Bella successfully makes a deal with the arcade's owner Mr Thomsett to renovate the arcade into a youth hangout spot. Dale turns up at the Arcade looking for the band, after Jake hires him to be their new drummer. After eventually finding Electric Arc, he competes with Jake in a competition to name as many details of songs as possible.
3	"Episode 3"	John Woods	"Takin' it Back"	28 September 1983
Bella and the band begin work on refurbishing the Arcade. She orders new arcade games for the venue from merchant Mr McMorrow, who soon delivers them. But everyone finds themselves distracted by the enigmatic Star Base, who turns up at the venue unannounced. She seeks to be the band's drummer, but instead sets her eyes on Jake. The two disappear for hours, much to Bella's chagrin, so in retaliation she hires popular band the Cured Lepurs to perform alongside Electric Arc. Later, Bella's absent mother turns up at her house asking Bella if she wants to move in with her.
4	"Episode 4"	John Woods	"Run and Hide"	5 October 1983
Two councillors - Hogan and Warren - turn up to inspect the Arcade. They find themselves unconvinced about the arcade's potential, so Bella invites them back for Electric Arc's gig that night. Only Hogan turns up, but he soon finds himself dancing along with the rest of the audience. Marcus loses his job as an electrician from working on the Arcade too much.
5	"Episode 5"	Vic Hughes	None	12 October 1983
Mrs Thomsett returns to the Arcade enraged about Bella's refurbishment plans so she kicks her and the band out. But soon Bella begins to uncover a conspiracy about Mrs Thomsett's antique furnishings business, so Bella and Deshaun break into the Arcade at night to gather proof in the hopes of making Mrs Thomsett back down. Meanwhile, Deshaun decides to enter a TV fashion show with the dresses she's made.
6	"Episode 6"	John Woods	"Honky Town Rap"	19 October 1983
Deshaun becomes one of the three finalists in the TV fashion show - so for her TV appearance, decides to hold her fashion display at the Arcade. The band seize this opportunity to make a video for one of their songs to appear on television. Bella's gran gets a job at the arcade as a caretaker.
7	"Episode 7"	Vic Hughes	None	26 October 1983
Deshaun discovers she came second in the competition. Bella and the band leave their hometown for their first London gig, but Bella plans on staying in London. Bella's mother Susan returns to, and decides to stay at the Harper household.

== Tie-in Merchandise ==
=== 7" Single ===
A single of one of Electric Arc's songs - "Honky Town Rap" - was released in 1983 by Red Bus Records. The B-side - "Just Another Song" is the theme tune to the show.

=== Novelisation ===
A novelisation of the series, by creator Gerard Macdonald, was released in September 1983 to coincide with the show's transmission. It was published by Fontana Lions in a paperback format.
