= Cabbages and Kings (British TV series) =

British children's TV comedy series (1972–1974)

- Genre: Children's
- Country of origin: United Kingdom
- Original language: English
- No. of series: 3
- No. of episodes: 11

Production
- Running time: 30 minutes

Original release
- Network: BBC 1
- Release: 30 June 1972 – 17 May 1974

Cabbages and Kings is a British children's historical comedy television series starring Johnny Ball, Derek Griffiths and Julie Stevens which was broadcast on BBC 1 from 1972 to 1974.

== Scheduling ==
The programme ran for three series. The first two in 1972 and 1973 had three episodes each. The final series had five episodes.

== See also ==
- Horrible Histories
