= Joanne Campbell (actress) =

British actress and drama therapist (1964–2002)

- Born: Joanne Elizabeth Campbell; 8 February 1964; Northampton, Northamptonshire, England
- Died: 20 December 2002 (aged 38); London, England
- Occupation: Actress
- Years active: 1982–2002

Joanne Elizabeth Campbell (8 February 1964 – 20 December 2002) was a British actress and drama therapist best known for playing Liz in the 1980s sitcom Me and My Girl and Josephine Baker on stage in This Is My Dream.

== Career ==
Born Joanne Elizabeth Campbell on 8 February 1964 in Northampton, her Jamaican mother was Una (born Radghan) and her father, Hedley Campbell, came from Trinidad. Campbell attended Northampton High School before training in London at the Arts Educational School. While she was still training she was chosen as the lead singer and dancer for a Cannon and Ball tour. She then began her acting career at the Theatre Royal in Stratford East, in 1982, playing Jack in "Jack and the Beanstalk" and becoming the first black principal boy in British pantomime.

After several other on stage acting roles, Campbell won her first lead role in 1987, playing Josephine Baker in This is my Dream. Later, she combined acting with teaching as one of the founding members of the BiBi Crew, the first British theatre company made up entirely of black actresses. As one of the group of seven, she co-wrote and acted in several plays, whose aim was to share the black experience to a wide audience.

As well as the above-mentioned comedies, her other television roles included parts in Dramarama, The Bill, London's Burning, and Birds of a Feather. Campbell also appeared in children's shows Bodger and Badger and Alphabet Castle. She also worked in radio in Mama I Want to Sing and The Cotton Club at the Aldwych Theatre, to mixed reviews.

In the 1990s, in addition to becoming a member of the board of directors of the Theatre Royal Stratford East, Campbell became a drama therapist and worked mostly with children at the Priory Hospital in North London. Unfortunately, she was not able complete her training to become a child and adolescent psychiatrist.

== Death ==
Campbell died suddenly as a result of deep-vein thrombosis aged 38 in London in 2002. At the time of her death she was working on the new BBC children's show U Get Me.

== Filmography ==
=== Television ===
Year	Title	Role	Notes
1983	The All Electric Amusement Arcade	Deshaun	
1984	Dramarama	Suki	episode: "Que Sera" (11 June 1984)
1984	Me and My Girl	Liz	
1989	Bodger and Badger	Mavis	Series One and Cameo in Series 2
1990	Nuns on the Run	Ward Nurse	
1990	London's Burning	Jenny	Six episodes (7 October – 18 November 1990)
1992	Us Girls	Beverley Pinnock	
1993	Love Hurts	Phoebe	episode: "For a Few Dollars More" (26 February 1993)
1993	Birds of a Feather	Jancis	episode: "Find the Lady" (7 November 1993)
1993	Alphabet Castle	Queen Bet/Various Roles	
1994	The Bill	Kate	episode: "No Job for an Amateur" (18 January 1994)
1997	Frighteners	Flick	episode: "Jevan" (11 March 1997)
