= Julie Stevens (English actress) =

English actress, presenter and singer (1936–2024)

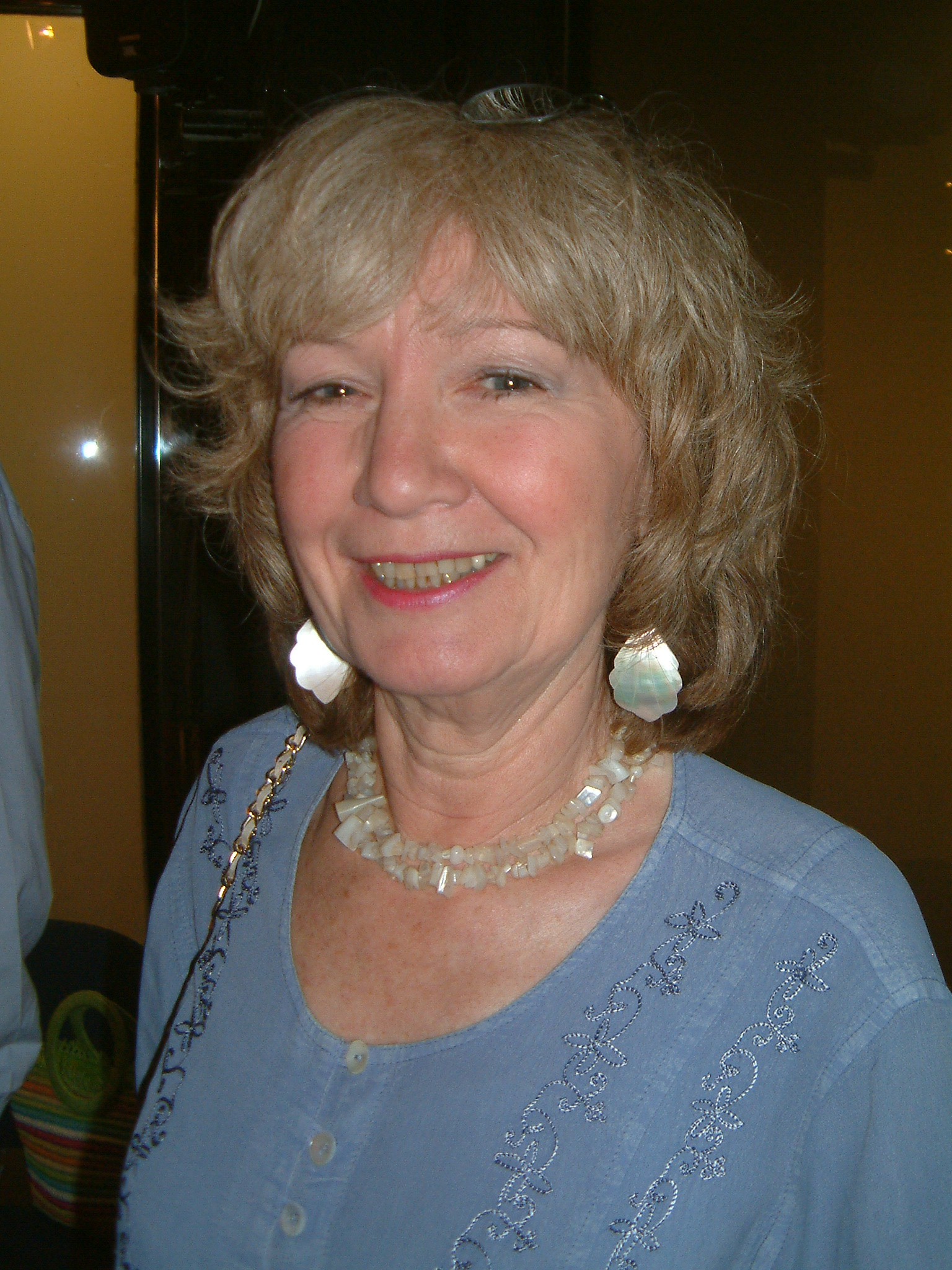
- Stevens in 2004
- Born: Julia Mary Bullas; 20 December 1936; Prestwich, Lancashire, England
- Died: 5 December 2024 (aged 87)
- Education: Philips High School
- Occupations: Actress; presenter; singer
- Spouses: John White (m. 1962; sep. 1975) Michael Hucks (m. 1981–2001)

Julie Stevens (born Julia Mary Bullas; 20 December 1936 – 5 December 2024) was an English actress, television presenter and briefly a singer. She was best known in Britain for her appearances on children's television and comedy serials.

== Early life ==
Julie Stevens was born in Prestwich, Lancashire, and attended Philips High School. She trained as a nurse at Manchester Royal Infirmary

== Acting career ==
After winning a talent contest, she started her television career as a comedienne in TV show Bid for Fame and was contracted to former network ABC Limitied

She was a regular presenter on Play School, joining in 1964 and staying with the programme until 1978. She also provided vocals for the schools television series Look and Read.

During the 1962–1963 season she played Venus Smith, an occasional partner of John Steed in the TV series, The Avengers, alternating with Honor Blackman's Cathy Gale. Venus was a nightclub singer, and each of her appearances included at least one musical number. She appeared in only six episodes, and Stevens is not usually included in the list of "Avengers girls".

In 1964, Stevens appeared in the British comedy film Carry On Cleo playing the slave girl Gloria. She also co-starred with Denise Coffey in the 1969–1971 ITV comedy series Girls About Town, and appeared in the children's historical comedy series Cabbages and Kings (1972) alongside Johnny Ball and Derek Griffiths.

She also appeared in television advertisement's, including a commercial for Mellow Bird's coffee, a product of Kraft Foods.

== Music career ==
In 1971, Stevens released a single, "Tally Man", on the MCA label (MK 5076). She also released another single that year, "After Haggerty", backed with "A Long Way From Home", which was released on Barry Class' Trend label, cat no. 6099 008.

== Personal life and death ==
Stevens married actor John White in January 1962; they had two children, but separated in 1975. She was later married to the actor and director Michael Hucks, from 1981 until 2001. White, who was also a presenter on Play School from 1962 to 1975, died from bone cancer in 1993.

Stevens was diagnosed with Parkinson's disease in 2021. She died from the disease on 5 December 2024, a couple of weeks before her 88th birthday.

== Discography ==
- Songs from Play School, with Rick Jones and Jonathan Cohen (1969)
