= Mio Mao =

Preschool animated television series

- Polish DVD cover
- Genre: Children's; Claymation; Educational
- Created by: Francesco Misseri
- Written by: Francesco Misseri
- Directed by: Ianfranco Baldi (series 1)
- Narrated by: Derek Griffiths (Five)
- Theme music composer: Piero Barbetti
- Opening theme: "Mio Mao"
- Ending theme: "Mio Mao"
- Countries of origin: Italy; United Kingdom (series 2 and 3)
- No. of series: 3
- No. of episodes: 78

Production
- Producer: Augusic Righi (series 1)
- Running time: 4–5 minutes
- Production companies: 1974 series: PMBB; 2005 series: Misseri Studio; Associati Audiovisivi

Original release
- Network: Programma Nazionale (series 1); Five (series 2 and 3)
- Release: 1974 – 2007

Mio Mao (pronounced me-o mow [ˈmiː.o mɑu̯]), also known as Mio and Mao, is a stop motion animated preschool children's television series created by Francesco Misseri in the 1970s, produced using claymation animation.

The original series was produced by PMBB and aired on Programma Nazionale in 1974. After Francesco Misseri's production company Misseri Studio acquired Mio Mao in 2000 and remastered series 1 in 2003, Misseri Studio and Associati Audiovisivi created two more series for Five's Milkshake! block in 2005 and 2007. In the United Kingdom, the episodes are narrated and the characters are voiced by Derek Griffiths. Mio Mao has aired on BabyFirst in the United States.

== Plot ==
Each episode is approximately five minutes long and focuses on the Mio, the red kitten; and Mao, the white kitten. As the episode progresses, they discover a variety of mysterious animals and objects on the other side. The garden changes appearance depending on the theme of the episode, or the animal or object featured.

The kittens go to investigate alone; they sometimes forget about the animal or object and wander off to look at the scenery. After a while, they get there but return scared, before watching from a distance and discovering that the scary item was either a friendly animal or a fun object.

Often, near the end of the episode, the animal or object will need help, and Mio and Mao come to their rescue, then invite the animal or object to come play with them. Gracious, the animal or object follows them as they squish and bounce back to the other side, posing together and looking at the viewers as the episode draws to a close.

== List of episodes ==
=== Series 1 (1974) ===
| No. in series | Title | Original release date |
|---|---|---|
| 1 | "The Egg" | 1974 |
| 2 | "The Peacock" | 1974 |
| 3 | "The Little Lamb" | 1974 |
| 4 | "The Ants" | 1974 |
| 5 | "The Chameleon" | 1974 |
| 6 | "The Beehive" | 1974 |
| 7 | "The Spider" | 1974 |
| 8 | "The Tortoise" | 1974 |
| 9 | "The Caterpillar" | 1974 |
| 10 | "The Cicada" | 1974 |
| 11 | "The Snake" | 1974 |
| 12 | "The Dog" | 1974 |
| 13 | "The Doormouse" | 1974 |
| 14 | "The Polyp" | 1974 |
| 15 | "The Hippopotamus" | 1974 |
| 16 | "The Squirrel" | 1974 |
| 17 | "The Monkey" | 1974 |
| 18 | "The Hedgehog" | 1974 |
| 19 | "The Shell" | 1974 |
| 20 | "The Tadpole" | 1974 |
| 21 | "The Snail" | 1974 |
| 22 | "The Owl" | 1974 |
| 23 | "The Mole" | 1974 |
| 24 | "The Beaver" | 1974 |
| 25 | "The Piglet" | 1974 |
| 26 | "The Hare" | 1974 |

=== Series 2 (2005–06) ===
| No. in series | Title | Original release date |
|---|---|---|
| 1 | "The Fox" | 2005 |
| 2 | "The Worm" | TBA |
| 3 | "The Anteater" | TBA |
| 4 | "The Seed" | TBA |
| 5 | "The Cricket" | TBA |
| 6 | "The Swan" | TBA |
| 7 | "The Turkey" | TBA |
| 8 | "The Crocodile" | TBA |
| 9 | "The Racoon" | TBA |
| 10 | "The Crab" | TBA |
| 11 | "The Penguin" | TBA |
| 12 | "The Little Bear" | TBA |
| 13 | "The Christmas Tree" | TBA |
| 14 | "The Snowman" | TBA |
| 15 | "The Seal" | TBA |
| 16 | "The Parrot" | TBA |
| 17 | "The Mushroom" | TBA |
| 18 | "The Dragonfly" | TBA |
| 19 | "The Bat" | TBA |
| 20 | "The Chestnut" | TBA |
| 21 | "The Hornet" | TBA |
| 22 | "The Kangaroo" | TBA |
| 23 | "The Cow" | TBA |
| 24 | "The Ladybird" | TBA |
| 25 | "The Donkey" | TBA |
| 26 | "The Koala" | 2006 |

=== Series 3 (2006–07) ===
| No. in series | Title | Original release date |
|---|---|---|
| 1 | "The Deer" | 2006 |
| 2 | "The Elephant" | TBA |
| 3 | "The Mouse" | TBA |
| 4 | "The Ostrich" | TBA |
| 5 | "The Pelican" | TBA |
| 6 | "The Dove" | TBA |
| 7 | "The Kingfisher" | TBA |
| 8 | "The Television" | TBA |
| 9 | "The Clew" | TBA |
| 10 | "The Dolphin" | TBA |
| 11 | "The Ghost" | TBA |
| 12 | "The Goldfish" | TBA |
| 13 | "The Zebra" | TBA |
| 14 | "The Vacuum Cleaner" | TBA |
| 15 | "The Sky Terrier" | TBA |
| 16 | "The Sloth" | TBA |
| 17 | "The Gorilla" | TBA |
| 18 | "The Jinn" | TBA |
| 19 | "The Bull" | TBA |
| 20 | "The Train" | TBA |
| 21 | "The Little Theater" | TBA |
| 22 | "The Tap" | TBA |
| 23 | "The UFO" | TBA |
| 24 | "The Vulture" | TBA |
| 25 | "The Piano" | TBA |
| 26 | "The Dinosaur" | 2007 |

== Production ==
Mio Mao was conceived when two abandoned kittens were found on the doorstep of Misseri Studio in Florence, Italy. These kittens became the studio's mascots. Francesco Misseri, the creative mind behind the studio, was captivated by their playful discovery of the world. Moved by their pure and innocent attitudes, he decided to feature them in the show. Francesco did not distinguish which kitten was Mio and which was Mao, as they were inseparable friends; to him, they were both Mio and Mao.
