= Young at Heart (1980 TV series) =

British TV sitcom (1980–1982)

- Genre: Sitcom
- Created by: Vince Powell
- Starring: John Mills; Megs Jenkins
- Country of origin: United Kingdom
- Original language: English
- No. of series: 3
- No. of episodes: 19

Production
- Producer: Stuart Allen
- Production company: ATV

Original release
- Network: ITV
- Release: 14 April 1980 – 5 November 1982

Young at Heart is a British independent television sitcom that was broadcast between 1980 and 1982. Starring John Mills and Megs Jenkins the series was about a married couple, Albert and Ethel Collyer, after Albert's enforced retirement at age 65 from his 50 years as a pottery worker. Although Mills had performed in comedy prior to this, Young at Heart was his first leading role in a sitcom.

The series was devised and written by Vince Powell. A pilot episode was broadcast in 1977 and three full series of five, seven and six episodes respectively were broadcast each year from 1980.

Filming was at the ATV studios in Elstree, London and on location in Stoke-on-Trent.

As well as starring Mills also sang the show's theme song.

== Cast ==
- John Mills as Albert Collyer
- Megs Jenkins as Ethel Collyer
- David Neilson as Norman Charlton and Carol Leader as Barbara Charlton, the Collyer's next door neighbours (series 1 and 2)
