= Michael Gover =

English actor (1913–1987)

- Born: 31 August 1913; Denmark
- Died: 2 May 1987 (aged 73); Sussex, England

Michael Ole Phillipson Gover (31 August 1913 – 2 May 1987) was an English actor best known for his portrayal of Arthur Russell in the BBC television series Survivors. He started acting late in life after failing in his dream of being an astronaut, and first appeared in an episode of The Avengers Man in the Mirror in 1963 as "One Six". He returned to the show two episodes later, in the same role.

His other television appearances include 10 episodes of Z-Cars, The Troubleshooters, Dixon of Dock Green, Softly, Softly, Randall and Hopkirk (Deceased) and Doomwatch.

His movie roles include the prison governor in A Clockwork Orange (1971) and one of the Elders in Superman (1978).

== Filmography ==
Year	Title	Role	Notes
1967	The Magnificent Two	Doctor Pablo	
1968	The Strange Affair	Det. Chief Supt.	
1969	The Assassination Bureau	Venice Hotel Manager	Uncredited
1969	Frankenstein Must Be Destroyed	Guest - Reading newspaper	
1971	Bel Ami	M Larache-Mathieu	3 episodes
1971	A Clockwork Orange	Prison Governor	
1974	11 Harrowhouse	Doctor on Plane	
1975	Survivors	Arthur Russell	
1978	Superman	6th Elder	(Krypton Council)
