= Alphabet Castle =

Television series

Alphabet Castle is an educational children's television programme produced in the UK and created by Michael Cole. It began in September 1993 with a series of 27 episodes aired on CITV, and ran until December 1995. It had three main characters: King Alpha, Queen Bet, and Gobbledygook, an animated turkey. It starred Stephen Cannon and Joanne Campbell. Music was by Paul Reade.

A total of three series and 65 editions were produced by Michael Cole productions for Carlton Television. Like its near namesake, Alphabet Zoo, a decade earlier, each episode was dedicated to a letter of the alphabet (although this format was dropped for the final series); episodes were generally around 10 minutes in length, and were broadcast in CITV on Wednesday afternoons.

== Transmission guide ==
Series 1: 30 editions from 10 September 1993 to 28 March 1994

Series 2: 20 editions from 7 September 1994 to 1 February 1995

Series 3: 15 editions from 6 September to 13 December 1995

=== Series 1 ===
#	Title	Original air date	Summary	VHS
1	A	10 September 1993	A look at the letter A	Alphabet Castle: A-M
2	B	September 1993	A look at the letter B	Alphabet Castle: A-M
3	C	unknown	A look at the letter C	Alphabet Castle: A-M
4	D	unknown	A look at the letter D	Alphabet Castle: A-M
5	E	unknown	A look at the letter E	Alphabet Castle: A-M
6	F	unknown	A look at the letter F	Alphabet Castle: A-M
7	G	unknown	A look at the letter G	Alphabet Castle: A-M
8	H	unknown	A look at the letter H	Alphabet Castle: A-M
9	I	unknown	A look at the letter I	Alphabet Castle: A-M
10	J	unknown	A look at the letter J	Alphabet Castle: A-M
11	K	unknown	A look at the letter K	Alphabet Castle: A-M
12	L	unknown	A look at the letter L	Alphabet Castle: A-M
13	M	unknown	A look at the letter M	Alphabet Castle: A-M
14	N	unknown	A look at the letter N	Alphabet Castle: N-Z
15	O	unknown	A look at the letter O	Alphabet Castle: N-Z
16	P	unknown	A look at the letter P	Alphabet Castle: N-Z
17	Q	unknown	A look at the letter Q	Alphabet Castle: N-Z
18	R	unknown	A look at the letter R	Alphabet Castle: N-Z
19	S	unknown	A look at the letter S	Alphabet Castle: N-Z
20	T	unknown	A look at the letter T	Alphabet Castle: N-Z
21	U	unknown	A look at the letter U	Alphabet Castle: N-Z
22	V	unknown	A look at the letter V	Alphabet Castle: N-Z
23	W	unknown	A look at the letter W	Alphabet Castle: N-Z
24	X	unknown	A look at the letter X	Alphabet Castle: N-Z
25	Y	unknown	A look at the letter Y	Alphabet Castle: N-Z
26	Z	28 March 1994	A look at the letter Z	Alphabet Castle: N-Z
