= Jon Glover =

English actor (b. 1952)

- Born: Jonathan Philip Glover; 26 December 1952 (age 73); Crediton, Devon, England
- Occupation: Actor
- Years active: 1972–present

Jonathan Philip Glover (born 26 December 1952) is an English actor. He has appeared in various television programmes including Play School, Survivors, the Management consultant in The Hitchhiker's Guide to the Galaxy, Casualty, Bodger & Badger and Peak Practice.

He provided the voices of several characters in the Animals of Farthing Wood animated series, and is also known for voice-acting for Noah's Island, Spitting Image and the character King Trode in the English language version of the PlayStation 2 game Dragon Quest VIII. He often appears in radio plays for Radio 4. He was a regular on the Radio 4 satirical programme Week Ending during the 1980s. He played the upper crust English character Mr Cholmondley-Warner in spoof 1940s government documentaries in Harry Enfield's Television Programme using Received Pronunciation.

His voices for Spitting Image included Prince Philip, Duke of Edinburgh, weather forecaster Ian McCaskill, Melvyn Bragg, Oliver Reed, South African State President P.W. Botha and snooker player Steve Davis.

He also did voices on other animated programmes such as Little Ghosts, The Adventures of Paddington Bear, Mr. Bean (2002), Ludwig, and Metalheads.

Glover has played theatrical agent Maurice Skellern in BBC Radio 4 adaptations of the Charles Paris mysteries; and in May 2013 played the roles of Lord Portico & Stockton in a BBC radio adaptation of Neil Gaiman's Neverwhere, adapted by Dirk Maggs. He plays Martyn Gibson in the long-running BBC radio soap opera The Archers.
