= The Owl Who Was Afraid of the Dark =

1968 book by Jill Tomlinson

The Owl Who Was Afraid of the Dark is a children's book by Jill Tomlinson, of which there is also an audio version read by Maureen Lipman. It was published in 1968, illustrated by Joanne Cole, and an abridged edition illustrated by Paul Howard published in 2001.

The story is about a young barn owl called Plop, who is frightened of the dark. The plot is divided into seven chapters, each covering a night during which Plop learns something new about the dark: dark is exciting, dark is kind, dark is fun, dark is necessary, dark is fascinating, dark is wonderful and dark is beautiful. Plop is gradually persuaded that the dark has its advantages.

The book shows what constellations are, especially Orion's belt, and has been adapted as a show at the London Planetarium. There have been stage adaptations of the book by Simon Reade and Tina Williams

The book has been recommended by clinicians for treatment of fear of the dark.

On 13 February 2022, the BBC broadcast the story on their CBeebies Bedtime Story programme, read by Catherine, Duchess of Cambridge.
