= Joe (TV series) =

- Created by: Alison Prince and Joe Li
- Narrated by: Lee Montague Illustrated by Joan Hickson (series 1); Colin Jeavons (series 2)
- Country of origin: United Kingdom
- Original language: English
- No. of series: 2
- No. of episodes: 26

Production
- Production company: Q3 London

Original release
- Network: BBC One
- Release: 3 October 1966 – 18 May 1971

Joe is a British children's television series written by Alison Prince, first broadcast in 1966 as part of the Watch with Mother slot. The eponymous Joe was the young son of a couple who ran a motel; in later episodes the family had moved to the seaside, where they ran a holiday hotel. The show was produced by Q3 London.

Books based on the series include Joe and the Nursery School and Joe Moves House, written with Joan Hickson.

== Episodes ==
=== Series 1 (1966) ===
No.	Title	Original release date
1	"Joe and a Horse"	3 October 1966
2	"Joe and the Flags"	10 October 1966
3	"Joe and the Ice Lorry"	17 October 1966
4	"Joe and the Flowers"	24 October 1966
5	"Joe's Rainy Day"	31 October 1966
6	"Joe and the Goulash"	7 November 1966
7	"Joe and Abel"	14 November 1966
8	"Joe and the Sheep"	21 November 1966
9	"Joe and the Market"	28 November 1966
10	"Joe and the Fog"	5 December 1966
11	"Joe and the Marbles"	12 December 1966
12	"Joe and the Dustcart"	19 December 1966
13	"Joe and the Football"	26 December 1966

=== Series 2 (1971) ===
No.	Title	Original release date
1	"Joe Moves House"	23 February 1971
2	"The Big Family"	2 March 1971
3	"Joe and the Pram"	9 March 1971
4	"Joe and the Painter"	16 March 1971
5	"Joe and the Baby"	23 March 1971
6	"The Busy Breakfast"	30 March 1971
7	"Joe and the Shop"	6 April 1971
8	"Joe and the Snow"	13 April 1971
9	"Joe and the Garden"	20 April 1971
10	"Joe and the Donkey"	27 April 1971
11	"Joe and the Plumber"	4 May 1971
12	"Joe and the Big Hill"	11 May 1971
13	"Joe and the Nursery"	18 May 1971
