= Fingermouse =

- Genre: Live-action/Puppet TV series
- Created by: Joanne Cole; Michael Cole
- Presented by: Iain Lauchlan
- Theme music composer: Michael Jessett
- Composer: Richard Brown
- Country of origin: United Kingdom
- Original language: English
- No. of seasons: 1
- No. of episodes: 13

Production
- Producer: Q3 London
- Running time: 15 minutes

Original release
- Network: BBC1
- Release: 25 September – 18 December 1985

Related
- Fingerbobs

Fingermouse is a British children's television programme created by Michael Cole for the BBC in 1985. It is a spin-off of the earlier series Fingerbobs. The first episode was broadcast on 25 September 1985 on BBC1. The eponymous star was a paper finger puppet in the form of a mouse, who would play various musical instruments with the help of Music Man, played by Iain Lauchlan. Fingermouse also went adventuring outside, interacting with other paper puppets made by artist Joanne Cole. The episodes were repeated frequently between 1986 and 1994. The series was also shown as part of the CBBC On Choice strand in 2000. For the 2000 repeats, the address to receive an instruction sheet (make your own Fingermouse) was removed.

== Episodes ==
No.	Title	Original release date
1	"String"	25 September 1985
Music Man brings Fingermouse to life and discovers that playing the strings of a violin makes a ball of string come to life, and leads Fingermouse a dance that lasts through the night.
2	"Gong"	2 October 1985
Music Man strikes a gong and everything gets going, including the boat on a willow-pattern plate. Fingermouse is the boat's captain and Drat the Rat is his first mate.
3	"Drum"	9 October 1985
Tom-toms beating makes a feather-duster in Music Man's house think it's a parrot and fly off to the jungle. Fingermouse follows the feather-duster and encounters snakes, tigers, crocodiles and a mouse-eating plant.
4	"Wand"	16 October 1985
Music Man shows Fingermouse how to use a conductor's baton, which is like a magic wand that can conjure up music.
5	"Harp"	23 October 1985
When Music Man shows Fingermouse how to play the harp it reminds him of drops of water falling to make a river. But when he finds a golden drop he is given a crown to play the part of King Midas, who turns everything he touches into gold.
6	"Concertina"	30 October 1985
Music Man shows Fingermouse how to play the concertina, and a folding concertina of frogs goes croaking off into the countryside. While searching for them, Fingermouse meets the Kingfisher and his Queen.
7	"Blow"	6 November 1985
Music Man shows Fingermouse how to play the flute. Straws dance out of the house to its sound and twirl and spin in the wind down to the river where they meet the Suckermonster.
8	"Guitar"	13 November 1985
Music from a bouzouki from Greece, a guitar from Spain and a balalaika from Russia makes Fingermouse dance. He meets Drat the Rat outside in the snow and they have a race to the top of the slippery snowman.
9	"Cello"	20 November 1985
Cello music makes Drat the Rat yawn, but Fingermouse finds ways to wake him up.
10	"Jazz"	27 November 1985
Fingermouse learns to play the piano and is rudely interrupted by Drat the Rat. Drat wants to sing too, but Fingermouse decides to look for a better singer among his riverbank friends.
11	"Percussion"	4 December 1985
Music Man shows Fingermouse percussion instruments, and the triangle is his favourite. Drat steals the beater and can't get a sound out of it.
12	"Sitar"	11 December 1985
The day dawns to sitar music. Drat decides to be nice for once and tells Fingermouse the story of the mouse and the lion.
13	"Trumpet"	18 December 1985
The trumpet plays a jazz tune, causing everything in Music Man's cupboard to dance. A sack of potatoes dances out of the house and Fingermouse tries to get them back.
