= Edward and Friends =

1987 British TV series

- Written by: Michael Cole
- Directed by: Jeff Newitt; Jo Pullen; Martin Pullen
- Starring: Bernard Cribbins; Royce Mills; Bill Pertwee; Sheila Steafel
- Opening theme: Mike Batt
- Country of origin: United Kingdom
- No. of episodes: 28

Production
- Running time: 5 minutes
- Production companies: FilmFair London; The Lego Group

Original release
- Network: BBC2
- Release: 19 June – 18 December 1987

Edward and Friends is a children's TV series in claymation from FilmFair that aired on British, New Zealand and Canadian television in 1987–1989. Each episode was 5-minutes in length and was based on the 1980s Lego Fabuland theme. 28 episodes were produced. It was the Lego Group's first foray into animation and television in general. Bernard Cribbins provided the voice-over for the show, written by Michael Cole with music by Mike Batt.

== List of characters ==
- Edward Elephant
- Bonnie Bunny
- Max Mouse
- Clive Crocodile
- Lionel Lion
- Hannah Hippopotamus
- Billy Bear
- Bertie Bulldog
- Boris Bulldog
- Catherine Cat
- Joe Crow
- Freddy Fox
- Mike Monkey
- Wilfred Walrus
- Lucy Lamb (books only)

== Video releases ==
Two VHS videocassettes of Edward and Friends were published by Screen Legends/Pickwick Video, which together comprised eighteen episodes. Between the episodes on VHS and back-to-back TV episodes, short segments were placed featuring Edward Elephant performing different tricks and one or two of his friends pushing apart the black screen.

Volume 1:
1. Edward Gets the Hiccups
2. Lionel's Party
3. Boris Gets a Scooter
4. Clive's Kite
5. Bertie's First Case
6. Edward and the Camera
7. Edward Joins the Band
8. Edward Goes Jogging
9. Wilfred's Treasure

Volume 2:

1. Edward to the Rescue
2. The Play
3. A Day for Skating
4. Bonnie and the Mole
5. Max and the Rainbow
6. Wilfred's Rocking Chair
7. Edward Tries to Help
8. Lionel's Car
9. A Robot for Max

A significant number of episodes were not released on VHS, including "Christmas in Fabuland", "Edward and the Big Balloon", "Catherine's Cake", "The Great Race", "The Snowfall", "The Clock Tower", "Clive is Taller", "Edward and the Statue", "The Expedition", and the Earth Day special "A Trust to Nature".

== Episodes ==
No.	Title	Original release date
1	"Edward Gets the Hiccups"	1 January 1987 (Canada); 19 June 1987 (UK)
After seeing Joe Crow practicing in his biplane, Edward Elephant gets hiccups. In order to cure him Joe Crow invites Edward to a daredevil flight and tries to scare his friend.
2	"Lionel's Party"	8 January 1987
Mayor of Fabuland Lionel Lion throws a mascarade party. Edward Elephant dresses as a tree and gets the first prize for the most unusual costume.
3	"Boris Gets a Scooter"	15 January 1987
Boris Bulldog is a postman, but thinks his work is very tiring, so Freddy Fox advises him to buy a scooter. Boris has some problems managing a scooter at first, but then he gets his work done too fast.
4	"Clive's Kite"	22 January 1987
The weather is too bad to play outdoors and Hannah Hippopotamus suggests Edward and his friends make kites to fly them later. Clive Crocodile joins the fun and unintentionally brokes all the kite strings.
5	"Bertie's First Case"	29 January 1987
Bertie Bulldog is a local policeman. He is bored because there are no crimes in Fabuland. Suddenly Bertie finds strange tracks on the shore and tries to locate the sea monster which have left them. Clive Crocodile reveals the tracks were made by his flippers for diving.
6	"Edward and the Camera"	5 February 1987
Wilfred Walrus gives his old camera to Edward Elephant so he can make photos of Fabuland for a photo album.
7	"Edward Joins the Band"	12 February 1987
Edward Elephant finds out that Lionel Lion once was a member of a music band and decides to start a band with his friends. Lionel gives Edward old music instruments. Elephant has much trouble trying to learn how to play the trumpet, and uses his trunk instead.
8	"Edward Goes Jogging"	19 February 1987
Max Mouse invites Edward Elephant to play football, but he prefers to sleep after eating a cake. Edward becomes overweight and his friends trick him into jogging for losing weight.
9	"Wilfred's Treasure"	26 February 1987
Captain Wilfred Walrus takes Edward Elephant and his friends to a nearby island on a ferry steamboat. Wilfred tells Max Mouse he found an empty treasure chest on that island, so a treasure may be buried there too. Max and Clive Crocodile search for treasures, but find only Wilfred's old telescope.
10	"Edward to the Rescue"	1 March 1987
Edward Elephant's friends are going to sail on Wilfred Walrus's steamboat without Edward, who doesn't like going on boats. After the steamboat's engine is broken and the vessel is to close to a big needle rock, Edward have to use a rowboat to deliver there the spanner forgotten on a shore by sailor Mike Monkey.
11	"The Play"	8 March 1987
Edward Elephant and his friends discover theatrical costumes in Fabuland clock tower. They decide to stage a play. Edward is appointed to provide sound effects.
12	"A Day for Skating"	15 March 1987
Winter came to Fabuland. Its inhabitants put on skates and began to skate on ice trying to warm up. Clive Crocodile suggests a competition with marks for the best performance.
13	"Bonnie and the Mole"	22 March 1987
A mole is making a tunnel, but mounds he make ruin gardens of Lionel Lion and Hannah Hippopotamus. Bonnie Bunny convinces Mr. Mole to relocate his home out of a town.
14	"Max and the Rainbow"	29 March 1987
Max Mouse wants to catch a rainbow while his friends are too busy to join him. Edward Elephant is experimenting with bubbles, and Bonnie Bunny knitting a scarf. Max gets lost in a fog, but he is saved by Lionel Lion and Joe Crow. Haven't caught a rainbow Max just paints one.
15	"Wilfred's Rocking Chair"	5 April 1987
While telling one of his stories Wilfred Walrus broke a rocking chair. Edward Elephant and his friends offer to mend it. Clive Crocodile says it's better to make a new one. Edward measures parts of the chair with his trunk so Billy Bear could make a rocking chair for Wilfred. The new chair is too big, but there's a room for all the friends.
16	"Edward Tries to Help"	12 April 1987
Edward Elephant is trying to be of help for his friends, but only messing things up. Eventually, nevertheless, he manages to help Clive Crocodile, who got stuck on a tree.
17	"Lionel's Car"	19 April 1987
Lionel Lion's car needs a repair. He leaves it at Billy Bear's garage. Billy goes to the ferry, where Wilfred Walrus and Edward Elephant have trouble with a crane. Lionel takes his car back, because he thinks it have been repaired, but then the car loses its right front wheel, which rolls all the way to the ferry. There Lionel gets his car fixed at last. Yet the hooter still isn't working, and Edward volunteers to hoot for it.
18	"A Robot for Max"	26 April 1987
Max Mouse reads a book about robots. His friends suggest he make a robot called Tinpot for himself. With the help of Billy Bear Max builds a robot and gives it to Catherine Cat as a helper, but the robot breaks and starts to ruin her kitchen. Max and his friends have to clean now.
19	"Christmas in Fabuland"	25 December 1987
It's almost Christmas, but a bad winter weather prevents a delivery of a Christmas tree. Lionel Lion gets last year's Christmas tree back and all the inhabitants of Fabuland celebrate Christmas together.
20	"Edward and the Big Balloon"	1 January 1988
Edward Elephant and his friends are going on a trip. Joe Crow has trouble with his airplane, so they use hot air balloon instead. When it begins to fall into the sea, Edward blows air out of his trunk to fill the balloon. Now that they are saved friends can have a picnic.
21	"Catherine's Cake"	8 January 1988
Catherine Cat bakes a berry cake, but fells asleep. The smell from her kitchen attracts Edward Elephant and his friends, but it is too late and the cake becomes burnt. Catherine starts to make another one and then goes to Freddy Fox's shop for ingredients. Meantime Edward places the dough to oven. When Catherine returns friends have a small cake.
22	"A Trust to Nature (Edward's Butterfly)"	22 April 1988
Edward Elephant and his friends are going to go catch bugs together. Edward catches a butterfly and calls it "Edward's Butterfly". Bonnie Bunny mistakes Max Mouse for a bug and catches him with her butterfly net.
23	"The Great Race"	29 April 1988
Edward Elephant cleans Lionel Lion's car, and then wants to drive it. Lionel doesn't approves of that, so Edward and Max Mouse make a go-kart. They decide to race with Lionel and Billy Bear. Lionel and Billy's go-kart loses its wheel right before the finish. Edward and Max's go-kart bumps into their rivals' vehicle and it crosses the finish line.
24	"The Snowfall"	2 May 1988
It's winter. Edward Elephant and his friends make a snowman, have a snowball fight, sledging and skiing. Bonnie Bunny and Hannah Hippopotamus find Lionel Lion's car buried under snow. While Hannah goes for help, Bonnie and her friends turn the car into a snowmobile.
25	"The Clock Tower"	6 May 1988
The clock tower stops striking. The inhabitants of Fabuland try to replace the clock tower chime with other sounds until the clock will be working properly again.
26	"Clive is Taller"	13 May 1988
Clive Crocodile wants to prove he's taller than Edward Elephant. Clive makes a pair of stilts for himself. Edward uses them too, so Clive makes longer stilts, but falls from them.
27	"Edward and the Statue"	20 May 1988
Wilfred Walrus ships a big statue of Lionel Lion, but it breaks due to Edward Elephant's incaution. Edward offers to make a new one and carving for some time. In the end Lionel is presented with just a figurine.
28	"The Expedition"	27 May 1988
Wilfred Walrus shows Edward Elephant and his friends a map. They are going on an expedition. At night Wilfred leaves Edward as captain, but he couldn't sail by the stars and crashes into shore of Fabuland.

== Books ==
In addition, there were also a series of seven books published by Ladybird Books Inc. The books have the same title as the TV series episodes and used still photos from the TV show. Each book contains 2 stories except Christmas in Fabuland, which, however, contains storylines from two episodes. The list of books available were:

- Lionel's Party/Edward and the Camera ISBN 0-7214-1063-4,
- Edward gets the Hiccups/Wilfred's Treasure ISBN 0-7214-1064-2,
- Edward joins the band/Clive's Kite ISBN 0-7214-1083-9,
- Lionel's Car/Edward to the rescue ISBN 0-7214-1084-7,
- Edward tries to help/Boris gets a scooter ISBN 0-7214-1200-9,
- Edward and the big balloon/A robot for Max ISBN 0-7214-1201-7,
- Christmas in Fabuland ISBN 0-7214-1191-6.

== Credits ==
- Voices: Bernard Cribbins, Royce Mills, Bill Pertwee, Sheila Steafel
- Written by: Michael Cole
- Music by: Mike Batt
- Technical design: Gordon Tait
- Models: Heather Boucher, Pauline London, Dave Witts
- Edited by: Rob Dunbar
- Executive producer: Graham Clutterbuck
- Produced by: Barrie Edwards
- Animated & directed by: Jo Pullen, Martin Pullen, Jeff Newitt
