= Star Terk II =

- Genre: Sketch show
- Running time: 30 minutes
- Country of origin: United Kingdom
- Language: English
- Home station: BBC Radio 4
- Starring: Christopher Godwin; Jeffrey Holland; Susie Blake; Fred Harris
- Written by: Terry Ravenscroft
- Produced by: Martin Fisher
- Original release: 14 November 1987 – 11 March 1989
- No. of series: 2
- No. of episodes: 12

Star Terk II is a BBC comedy radio show.

"The sketch show with a hint of a Starship and where words with a 'k' are mispronounced".

It was first broadcast on Saturday 14 November 1987 at 11:30pm on BBC Radio 4 until 11 March 1989 and rebroadcast on BBC Radio 4 Extra in 2025.

Each episode began with a parody of Star Trek's original series, which would go on to be interrupted by a series of sketches. Two series of six episodes were aired, in 1987 and 1989. In the final episode, the main characters of Star Trek beam down and meet up with the actors playing them in the parody, resulting in Susie Blake interviewing herself as Uhura at one point.

== Episodes ==
1. Janet St. Porter's Bedroom
2. In A Lift With John Inman
3. Ken Dodd's Wallet
4. North Face Of Claire Rayner
5. Annual Convention Of Radio Producers
6. Inside Denis Thatcher's Trousers
7. To Boldly Start The Series
8. To Bald-Ly Go
9. Two Balled Well Go
10. To Billed Go Well
11. To Coldly Go
12. To Boldly Mow
