= Gran (TV series) =

- Created by: Michael and Joanne Cole
- Directed by: Ivor Wood
- Starring: Patricia Hayes
- Music by: Bryan Daly
- Country of origin: United Kingdom
- No. of episodes: 13

Production
- Running time: 5 minutes per episode (approx)
- Production company: Woodland Animations

Original release
- Network: BBC 1
- Release: 17 February – 12 May 1983

Gran is a British short-lived stop motion animation television series narrated by Patricia Hayes and directed by Ivor Wood. The show features a grandmother, Gran, and her grandson, Jim, going on adventures together.

Despite moderate popularity with young audiences in the mid-1980s, the series has not been seen on UK television since being repeated as part of the Tiny Living broadcasting block on Living TV in the late 1990s, and no further episodes were made. Universal Pictures released all 13 episodes on Region 2 DVD in the U.K. on 7 March 2005, but the release has since been discontinued.

== Synopsis ==
At first glance you may think Gran is like any other grandmother, but she's not. Along with her grandson, Jim, she takes part in different crazy adventures. Each episode sees Gran performing weird and wacky tasks, such as growing her runner beans up a dinosaur skeleton, hang gliding, knitting a giant scarf to wrap around her house in the winter, and cross country motorbike racing. But one thing's for sure – she'll always be wearing her pink slippers.

== Production and broadcast ==
The programme was produced by Woodland Animations and was created and written by Michael and Joanne Cole. Ivor Wood produced thirteen five-minute short film episodes in 1982 and the series was broadcast on the BBC between 17 February 1983 and 12 May 1983. In 1984, the BBC also screened the series as part of its See-Saw children's television strand (the "new" name for the cycle originally known as Watch with Mother). The series was then regularly repeated until 1989. Children's books based on the series, written by Michael and illustrated by Joanne Cole were also published in 1983. The series was also shown in the United States as part of the Nickelodeon series Eureeka's Castle, in Latin America on Boomerang Latin America and in Canada on Teletoon.

== Episodes ==
No.	Title	Original release date
1	"Gran Gliding"	17 February 1983
Jim visits his Gran and persuades her to come with him to fly his kite. But something else called a 'hang glider' catches Gran's eye.
2	"Gran Knits"	24 February 1983
Gran may not be very good at knitting but when she gets going there is no stopping her and the whole house is soon protected from the winter cold.
3	"Gran's Pets"	3 March 1983
Gran makes up for all the time she has lived without animals after she visits the zoo and takes a shine to the monkeys.
4	"Gran the Goalie"	10 March 1983
Gran soon learns from Jim how to save goals, before going to watch the local football team and ending up as a goalkeeper for it.
5	"Gran's Old Bones"	17 March 1983
Gran and Jim dig up some strange bean poles in the garden. They visit the museum, convinced that they've found dinosaur bones.
6	"Gran's Gadgets"	24 March 1983
Gran thinks how to make life easier around the house.
7	"Gran's Good News"	31 March 1983
Gran doesn't like watching the depressing weather forecasts on TV, so she gets her own show where she only gives the good news.
8	"Gran's Bike"	7 April 1983
Gran likes the look of Jim's pushbike but she finds it too slow to go shopping. Being Gran, she takes up cross-country motorbiking instead after taking a tumble in the garden with the shopping.
9	"Gran the Camper"	14 April 1983
Jim goes on a school camping trip in the hills but when he gets to the top he finds someone is already camping there – can you guess who? Eventually Gran goes out of her way to show Jim her camping saucepans.
10	"Snow Gran"	21 April 1983
Gran finds tobogganing too tame and takes up skiing, but that doesn't go well when skiing in the garden leads to crashing into a snowman.
11	"Gran's Rare Bird"	28 April 1983
Gran and Jim go bird watching. Gran is so determined to spot a rare bird that Jim decides to help her out.
12	"Grandmother Clock"	5 May 1983
Gran repairs a clock and from then on everything goes like clockwork with many clocks.
13	"Gran's Goat"	12 May 1983
Gran gets some goats to keep her grass down – but they get her down too.

== Music ==
=== Finnish ===
Songs in the Finnish dub were sung by the actors of YLE Import re-using the De Angelis's music but with new Finnish lyrics. In the Finnish dub some scenes are cut, which includes musical numbers in some episodes.

== Home media ==
=== UK VHS release ===
Castle Communications released one video of Gran with 12 episodes, which later got repackaged as a single title by the Castle Communications 'Playbox' brand of children's video titles (Cat. No. PVC 121).

VHS Title	Release Date	Episodes
Gran - 12 Classic Episodes (CVS 4083)	1996	"Gran Gliding"; "Gran Knits"; "Gran's Pets"; "Gran's A Goalie"; "Gran's Gadgets"; "Gran's Good News"; "Gran's Bike"; "Gran the Camper"; "Snow Gran"; "Gran's Rare Bird"; "Grandmother Clock"; "Gran's Goat"

On 1 June 1999, Castle Home Video (a division of Castle Music Ltd.) released a single video of Gran with all 13 episodes of the entire series (including Gran's Old Bones as its first episode along with the 12 other episodes of Gran from its original Castle Communications video release).

VHS Title	Release Date	Episodes
Gran (CHV 2051)	1 June 1999	"Gran's Old Bones"; "Gran Gliding"; "Gran Knits"; "Gran's Pets"; "Gran's A Goalie"; "Gran's Gadgets"; "Gran's Good News"; "Gran's Bike"; "Gran the Camper"; "Snow Gran"; "Gran's Rare Bird"; "Grandmother Clock"; "Gran's Goat"

GOOF: The cover of Gran (CHV 2051) mistakenly contains 12 episodes on the back cover and credited as "12 classic episodes" on the front cover whereas the actual video cassette contained all 13 episodes of Gran.
