= Paul Reade =

British composer (1943–1997)

- Born: Paul Geoffrey Reade; 10 January 1943; Liverpool, England, United Kingdom
- Died: 7 June 1997 (aged 54)
- Genres: Television, ballet
- Occupation: Composer

Paul Geoffrey Reade (10 January 1943 – 7 June 1997) was an English composer. Born in Liverpool, he studied piano and composition (1962-1965) at the Royal Academy of Music with Alan Richardson and worked at English National Opera as a répétiteur. In 1991 he received an Ivor Novello Award for his theme music for The Victorian Kitchen Garden television series.

== Career ==
Reade's first piece for orchestra, Overture to a City, was performed in 1965 by the Academy Orchestra under Maurice Handford. From the late 1960s he became well known as a composer for children's television, with credits including the theme tune and many songs for Play School in 1968. (He was also the Play School pianist). He arranged the Beethoven extracts heard by millions of children in the surreal animated series Ludwig. His other children's television credits include The Flumps, Crystal Tipps and Alistair, Alphabet Castle and Mortimer and Arabel. There is also a full length opera for children, David and Goliath (1975), which was successfully revived by Stephen Lawless at the Buxton Festival in 1985.

He also composed the scores for the BBC Classic serials A Tale of Two Cities (1980), Great Expectations (1981) and Jane Eyre (1983). The music for The Victorian Kitchen Garden (1989) has been published in various arrangements and continues to be played in recitals and music examinations. With Tim Gibson he composed the theme music for the Antiques Roadshow.

Several works featuring narrator and orchestra for young people appeared in the 1980s, written for the Manchester Camerata, including Cinderella (1980) and The Midas Touch (1982). They were premiered at the Royal Exchange, Manchester and later broadcast, with narrations by Michael Hordern and Nigel Hawthorne. The Camerata commissioned Reade's Flute Concerto in 1985, first performed by his future wife Philippa Davies. The orchestral song cycle Chants du Roussillon, first performed in 1988 at Moura Lympany's Rasiguères Festival, were written for the soprano Elizabeth Harwood and subsequently recorded by Virginia Kerr. Choral works include the cantatas The Journey of the Winds (1976) and Ballads of Judas Iscariot (1988). His chamber music in particular shows the influence of French impressionism, tempered by the English pastoral style. Examples include the Saxophone Quartet (1979) and Aspects of a Landscape for solo oboe.

Reade eventually turned to ballet; among the latter works he scored were Hobson's Choice in 1989 (choreographed by David Bintley from the eponymous play), and 1996's Far from the Madding Crowd (after the work by Thomas Hardy). Hobson's Choice was recorded by the Royal Ballet Sinfonia and released on ASV Records in 1993, while Far From the Madding Crowd was recorded by the Sinfonia in 1998 on Black Box.

A recording of vocal, orchestral and chamber works, A Celebration of Paul Reade, was issued in 2023 by Signum Records, including Chants du Roussillon, Song of the Birds, Suite from The Victorian Garden, the Serenata for Wind Sextet, and Catalonia, the first movement of a proposed bassoon concerto, which was the last piece that Reade composed. Also left unfinished was a harmonica concerto for Larry Adler.

== Death ==
Reade died of cancer on 7 June 1997. He was survived by his wife Philippa Davies (the principal flautist of the London Mozart Players), as well as his ex-wife Mary Clark (married 1965, divorced 1985), and their son and daughter.
