= Conspiracy of Silence (The Avengers) =

- The Avengers episode
- Screen title
- Episode no.: Season 2 Episode 23
- Directed by: Peter Hammond
- Written by: Roger Marshall
- Production code: 3522
- Original air date: 1 March 1963

Guest appearances
- Robert Rietti; Sandra Dorne; Alec Mango; Roy Purcell; Tommy Godfrey

Episode chronology
← Previous "Man in the Mirror"	Next → "A Chorus of Frogs"

"Conspiracy of Silence" is the twenty-third episode of the second series of the 1960s cult British spy-fi television series The Avengers, starring Patrick Macnee and Honor Blackman. It was first broadcast in the Teledu Cymru region of the ITV network on Friday 1 March 1963. ABC Weekend TV, who produced the show for ITV, broadcast it the next day in its own regions. The episode was directed by Peter Hammond and written by Roger Marshall.

== Plot ==
Steed and Cathy investigate a Mafia drugs gang using a travelling circus as a front. Clowning around leads a nosy journalist to use her judo.

== Cast ==
- Patrick Macnee as John Steed
- Honor Blackman as Cathy Gale
- Robert Rietti as Carlo Bennett
- Sandra Dorne as Rickie Bennett
- Alec Mango as Sica
- Roy Purcell as Gutman
- Tommy Godfrey as Arturo
- John Church as Terry
- Artro Morris as James
- Willie Shearer as Professor
- Ian Wilson as Rant
