= Makki Marseilles =

- Μακκί Μαρσέιγ
- Born: Marseille, France
- Occupations: Journalist, actor, stage director, producer and playwright
- Spouse(s): Gillian Marseilles (m. 1962, divorced) Jennifer Bell (m. 1979)

Abraham Constantinidis, better known as Makki Marseilles, (Greek: Μακκί Μαρσέιγ), is a Greek journalist, actor, stage director, producer and playwright.

== Life ==
He was born in Marseille, France, grew up in Greece and began his acting career there. In 1957, he planned to emigrate to Canada, but stopped in the UK on the way and decided to stay.

He is the founder and artistic director of the Rainbow Theatre. Its first production was "Fantoccini" in 1988.

Marseilles has also as a senior journalist based in Athens. He edited several English-language newspapers in Greece and worked as reports freelance for several foreign titles, including the BBC.

== Filmography ==
=== Television ===
Year	Title	Role	Notes
1962	BBC Sunday-Night Play	Lt. Georgi Pushkof	Episode: "Up a Gum Tree"
1963	The Avengers	Andreas Stephanopoulus	Episode: "A Chorus of Frogs"
1963	Armchair Theatre	Charlot	Episode: "Late Summer"
1963	Compact	Bartmann	Episode: "A Ring for Iris"
1965	Z-Cars	Croupier	Episode: "Cop and Blow"
1966	The Wednesday Play	Costas Hadjimitsis	Episode: "Little Master Mind"
1967	Man in a Suitcase	Third Seaman	Episode: "Variation on a Million Bucks Part Two"
1967	The Wednesday Play	Pierre	Episode: "The Profile of a Gentleman"
1968	The Troubleshooters	Bruno	Episode: "The Day the Sea Caught Fire"
1969	Strange Report	Popescu	Episode: "REPORT 5055 CULT 'Murder shrieks out'"
1969	Department S	Gendarme	Episode: "The Mysterious Man in the Flying Machine"
1975	Softly, Softly: Task Force	Andreottis	Episode: "Bargains"
