= Pigeon Street =

British children's animated TV series

- Genre: Children
- Written by: Michael Cole
- Voices of: George Layton
- Country of origin: United Kingdom
- Original language: English
- No. of series: 2
- No. of episodes: 13

Production
- Production location: UK
- Running time: 15 minutes

Original release
- Network: BBC1
- Release: 10 February – 17 December 1981

Pigeon Street is a British cutout animated children's television series, written by Michael Cole, originally shown on the BBC in 1981 as part of its 'See-Saw' strand for preschoolers. There were two series with eight and five episodes respectively, each programme lasting 15 minutes. The series was repeated a number of times until 1994.

== Plot ==
The shows featured the everyday adventures of a group of characters living on Pigeon Street, an area of flats and terraced housing in a British city, also home to several pigeons which appeared in each show but only occasionally featured in the plot. Characters included lorry driver Long Distance Clara, her husband Hugo the chef, Mr Baskerville the detective, Mr Jupiter the astronomer, Mr Macadoo the petshop owner, and twins Molly and Polly, who were only distinguishable by the letter M and P on their jumpers.

== Production ==
The animation was created by Alan Rogers and Peter Lang of the Cut-Out Animation Co., who later went on to do a nursery rhyme series with similar animation called Rub-A-Dub-Dub. It was narrated by George Layton, with additional narration by John Telfer. The music was composed by Benni Lees, and arranged by Soulyard.

== Episodes ==
=== Series overview ===
Series	Episodes	Originally released		
Series	Episodes	First released	Last released	Network
1	8	10 February 1981	31 March 1981	BBC 1
2	5	19 November 1981	17 December 1981	BBC 1

=== Series 1 ===
No. overall	No. in series	Title	Original release date
1	1	"All in a Day's Work"	10 February 1981
William the Window Cleaner has a busy day when the lift of Skyrise Court breaks down, but Reg, Clara, Hugo, Mr. Jupiter and everybody else in Pigeon Street lend a helping hand.
2	2	"A Light in the Sky"	17 February 1981
What is the light in the sky that Mr Jupiter has spotted? Is it an aeroplane, a shooting star or a spark from Reg's bonfire?
3	3	"Pigeon at Sea"	24 February 1981
Mr Macadoo, Mr Baskerville and 'Long Distance' Clara help a pigeon realise that it cannot take to water like a duck or a gull.
4	4	"Can I Have My Ball Back?"	3 March 1981
Gerald gets a football for his birthday. Reg, Mr Jupiter, Mr Baskerville and Watson join him for a game on the green but a long kick by Gerald leads to trouble.
5	5	"Noisy Neighbours"	10 March 1981
The noise Daisy makes gets on the nerves of her neighbour Rose. Rose's noise annoys Daisy too, but then they find out how to use the thin wall between them.
6	6	"Pigeon Post"	17 March 1981
Bob has trained his pigeons to fly back to him however far they go. Clara, the lorry driver, finds that they are the only way of sending a very important message.
7	7	"A Cold Day"	24 March 1981
Everybody in Pigeon Street has a cold, until Hugo the cook stumbles upon a cure.
8	8	"Somewhere to Eat"	31 March 1981
When it is lunchtime in Pigeon Street most people make do with sandwiches. Hugo and Betty plan how everybody could meet up and eat lunch together but it is not as easy as it looks.

=== Series 2 ===
No. overall	No. in series	Title	Original release date
9	1	"Down with the Car Park"	19 November 1981
Jim, Gerald and the twins discover that Mr Clark of the council has plans to build a garage on their playground. The only answer is to protest, but it proves very expensive.
10	2	"The Flood"	26 November 1981
Day after days of rain bring a flood to Pigeon Street. Reg uses a boat from Swanlake Park to rescue the pets and when they are aboard Daisy thinks his boat looks like Noah's Ark.
11	3	"Hobbies"	3 December 1981
Everybody in Pigeon Street seems to be taking up a hobby but when Gerald decides to play the saxophone he has to find somewhere to practice where there's nobody to disturb.
12	4	"Springtime for Hugo"	10 December 1981
Hugo has to lose weight and Dr Glossop advises him to go jogging with him. But jogging is not the right sort of exercise for Hugo. What is? Clara comes up with the answer.
13	5	"Getting Away"	17 December 1981
Everybody in Pigeon Street is going on holiday. Mr Macadoo wants to go too so Gerald and Mr Baskerville look after his pet shop while he is away. But things don't go according to plan.

== Characters ==
- Ranjit Bains: Jim, Gerald, Molly and Polly's friend.
- Mr Baskerville: The detective is always carrying his magnifying glass and has a dog called Watson.
- Betty Cox: The school dinner lady and is William's wife and Jim's mother.
- Jim Cox: William and Betty's son.
- William Cox: The window cleaner and is Betty's husband and Jim's father.
- Flash: Mr Jupiter's dog.
- Rose Fogg: The other old lady who is another next door neighbour to Daisy and scares the pigeons away.
- Fiona Glossop: The owner who made strawberry jam and is Gerald, Molly and Polly's mother and the wife of John.
- Gerald Glossop: Molly and Polly's older brother and son of John and Fiona.
- Dr John Glossop: The doctor and is Fiona's husband and Gerald, Molly and Polly's father.
- Molly Glossop: Gerald's sister, Polly's twin sister and twin daughter of John and Fiona.
- Polly Glossop: Gerald's other sister, Molly's twin sister and other twin daughter of John and Fiona.
- Mr Jupiter: The astronomer is always carrying his telescope and has a dog called Flash.
- Mr Macadoo: The pet shop owner.
- Clara Newman: The lorry driver and is Hugo's wife.
- Hugo Newman: The local chef and is Clara's husband.
- Bob Pottage: The owner of the cycle shop called "Bob's Bikes" and is Reg's brother and Doreen's brother-in-law.
- Doreen Pottage: The owner of the launderette and is Reg's wife and Bob's sister-in-law.
- Reg Pottage: The park sweeper and is Doreen's husband and Bob's brother.
- Tom: Mr Macadoo's cat.
- Daisy Waldron: The old lady who is a next-door neighbour to Rose and feeds the pigeons on her window sill.
- Watson: Mr Baskerville's dog.

Rogers and Lang went on to create many animations for programmes like Words and Pictures, Numbertime, Rosie and Jim, Hotch Potch House, Rat-A-Tat-Tat and The Number Crew.
