= Bod (TV series) =

British TV children's series (1975–1976)

- Created by: Joanne Cole; Michael Cole
- Starring: John Le Mesurier; Derek Griffiths; Maggie Henderson
- Country of origin: United Kingdom
- Original language: English
- No. of episodes: 13

Production
- Running time: 15 minutes

Original release
- Network: BBC1
- Release: 23 December 1975 – 16 March 1976

Bod is a British children's television programme first shown on BBC1 in 1975, with thirteen episodes, based on four original Bod books by Joanne and Michael Cole. It is a cutout animated cartoon series narrated by John Le Mesurier and Maggie Henderson with music by Derek Griffiths and produced by David Yates.

== Source books ==
The four books were published in 1965 in the United Kingdom and later in the United States and France. They are: Bod's Apple, Bod's Present, Bod's Dream and Bod and the Cherry Tree. The French version of Bod's Apple is called La Pomme de Gus.

Before the animated series was commissioned, the four books had been read on another BBC children's programme: Play School. In 1974, thirteen five-minute episodes were created for transmission on the BBC as part of the Watch with Mother series, and were also sold to Australia's ABC channel. Soon thereafter, it was shown in New Zealand, the Netherlands, Sweden, Finland, Norway, Poland and Israel. In the United States, Bod aired on Nickelodeon as a segment on the Pinwheel program.

== Characters ==
The character of Bod is a boy who lives in a town with Aunt Flo, PC Copper, Frank the Postman and Farmer Barleymow. Each of the characters has their own theme music performed by Griffiths which is heard when they appear. Regular features are animal identification and Bod Snap.

== Episodes ==
No.	Title	First broadcast
1	"Bod's Present*"	23 December 1975
2	"Bod and the Dog*"	30 December 1975
3	"Bod and the Apple"	6 January 1976
4	"Bod and the Kite"	13 January 1976
5	"Bod and the Cherry Tree"	20 January 1976
6	"Bod and the Rain"	27 January 1976
7	"Bod's Dream*"	3 February 1976
8	"Bod on the Beach"	10 February 1976
9	"Bod and the Birds*"	17 February 1976
10	"Bod and the Cake"	24 February 1976
11	"Bod and the Grasshopper"	2 March 1976
12	"Bod in the Park"	9 March 1976
13	"Bod And Breakfast*"	16 March 1976

All thirteen Bod episodes have been released on DVD, presented in a different order.

== Alberto Frog ==
There is also another segment which appears with each episode called Alberto Frog and his Amazing Animal Band with artwork by Joanne Cole. This section, narrated by Maggie Henderson, features short extracts from famous pieces of classical music as part of the story, and usually ends with Alberto choosing a different flavour of milkshake as his reward for solving a problem.

The Alberto Frog segments were produced separately by the BBC and were originally shown alongside the Bod episodes; only five of these thirteen segments are known to survive, following a decision in the early 1990s to wipe a large amount of videotaped 1970s children's programmes.

The five surviving segments are marked above with an asterisk and are present on the Bod DVD. Another was recovered from an old VHS tape and is available on YouTube, and a further full episode - Bod and the Grasshopper - appeared in 2020.

== Tie-ins and Taoism ==
As well as books for each of the televised episodes, there have been two other tie-in books based on Bod, by Alison and Lo Cole, the children of creators Joanne and Michael Cole. Bod's Way: The Meaning of Life was being worked on by Michael Cole before he died in 2001, and was completed by Alison.

The books reveal the Taoist beliefs of Bod's original creators.

- Cole, Alison (2002), Bod's Way: The Meaning of Life, ISBN 1-84357-029-7
- Cole, Alison; Cole, Lo (2003), Bod's New Leaf: Making a Fresh Start, ISBN 1-84357-076-9

== References in other media ==
Bod is a fictional deity in the BBC Radio 4 science fiction comedy Nebulous, and the Bod theme music is heard in one episode.

Homestar Runner's titular character dressed up as Bod for the 2020 Halloween special.

== Legacy ==
Bod has appeared in Channel 4's 100 Greatest Kids' TV shows and 100 Greatest Cartoons.
