= Fred Harris (presenter) =

British television presenter

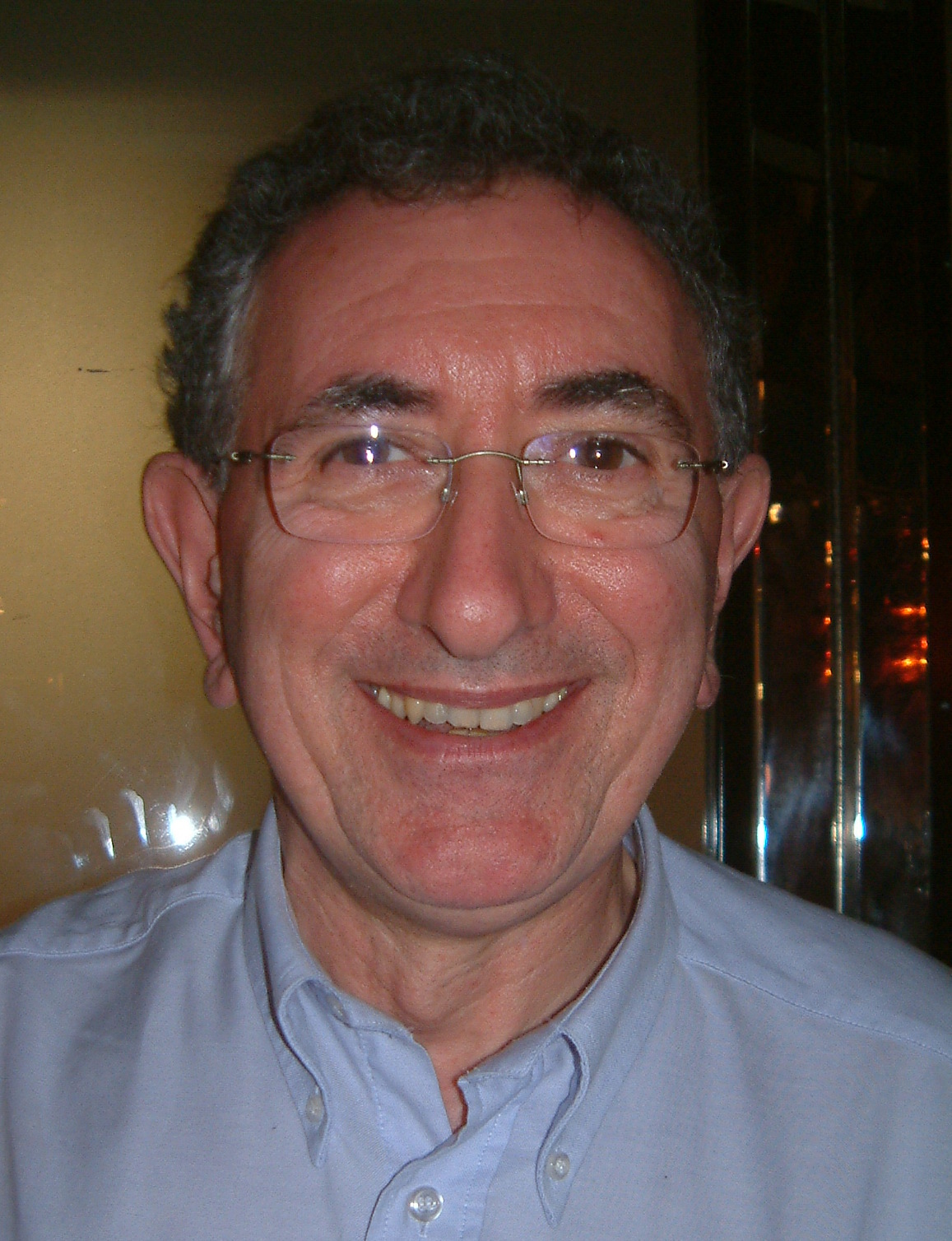
- Born: May 7, 1947 (age 79)
- Occupations: Television presenter, comedian
- Notable work: Play School

Fred Harris (born 7 May 1947) is a British comedian and children's television presenter. Formerly a schoolteacher, he began his television career as a presenter of the BBC children's programme Play School, on which he appeared regularly between 1973 and 1988. During this time he was also a presenter on Ragtime and Chock-A-Block.

During the rise of the microcomputer in the early 1980s he fronted several home computing BBC programmes, including Micro Live (which formed part of BBC's ongoing Computer Literacy Project). He also presented a number of educational and schools programmes on the subject of maths, including ATV's Figure it Out (memorable for having a set which included a giant pocket calculator), Central Television's Basic Maths and Channel 4's Make It Count. In 1980, Harris appeared as a contestant on the first episode of The Adventure Game.

His career in comedy involved regular appearances in radio shows such as Huddwinks, The Half-Open University, The Burkiss Way and Star Terk II and in the television show End of Part One.

In the 1990s, he presented the Radio 4 programme The Litmus Test.

From the late 1990s until circa 2009, he worked on the British Forces Broadcasting Service (BFBS) children's programme Room 785. On this show he presented the "Broom Cupboard" slot introducing the forthcoming programmes.

He is the father of playwright Ed Harris.
