= Rick Jones (television presenter) =

Canadian television presenter and musician (1937–2021)

- Rick Jones hosting Fingerbobs

Background information
- Born: Frederick Joseph Jones; 7 February 1937; London, Ontario, Canada
- Died: October 7, 2021 (aged 84) San Francisco, California, United States
- Education: Webber Douglas School of Singing and Dramatic Art
- Genres: Folk music, country rock
- Occupations: Television presenter; musician
- Instruments: Vocals, guitar, keyboards
- Formerly of: Meal Ticket

Frederick Joseph Jones (7 February 1937 – 7 October 2021) was a Canadian-born television presenter, singer-songwriter and folk musician, best known for his work in BBC children's television programmes Play School (1964–1973) and Fingerbobs in 1972.

== Life and career ==
Jones was born on 7 February 1937, in London, Ontario, Canada. His father was Frederick Jones, who served in the Canadian Army, and his mother was Agnes (née Hanson), who had both emigrated from Britain. He had an older sister who died in 2020 from COVID-19. A cousin whose parents had died also lived with them.

He moved to the UK at the age of 18 to study at the Webber Douglas School of Singing and Dramatic Art. He began his television career as one of the original co-presenters of Play School, a daily programme for pre-school-age children, in which he played guitar and sang. While Jones was appearing in Spoon River at the Royal Court Theatre in London in 1964, the programme's producer Joy Whitby invited him to join the cast. In 1972, he became the host of Fingerbobs, another show for younger children, in which he created characters from finger puppets made of paper. He also wrote and performed the English theme for the French TV series The Aeronauts.

He was one of several entertainers who took turns to present We Want To Sing, a musical variety series made by BBC Manchester, in which a young live audience was invited to sing along with songs performed by the host and various guests such as The New Seekers, The Settlers, and cabaret trio The New Faces. Other BBC TV programmes in which he appeared included Watch and Play Away.

His 1972 song Saskatchewan Sunrise reached #26 on the Canadian charts, May 20, 1972.

In 2012 Jones confirmed the widespread use of marijuana on the show Play School after Johnny Ball, another presenter, alleged that Jones and Lionel Morton were "stoned out of their minds" before filming in the 1970s. In an interview for The Sun Jones said that the BBC was "really liberal" at the time, explaining "Once you were in all laws were forgotten. I had a wonderful time... Marijuana was like cornflakes." Having been fired by the BBC, after a fan sent him two cannabis spliffs at the corporation's address,

Jones subsequently had success as a musician (keyboards/vocals) fronting the British country rock band Meal Ticket. Songs featuring him included "Snow", "Last Port of Call", and "Laughing Daughter". The song "Better Believe it Babe" featured as the theme for the BBC television Play for Today episode The Flipside of Dominick Hide (1980) and its sequel Another Flip for Dominick (1982). After Meal Ticket broke up, Jones wrote and appeared in the musical Flash Fearless vs. The Zorg Women in Los Angeles. In 2001, he reunited with Meal Ticket for a one-off gig at a London pub.

Jones latterly lived in San Francisco, United States, with his wife, Valerie. In collaboration with Roger Penycate, he wrote a stage musical based on the songs and lyrics of Meal Ticket (originally written by Rick Jones and Dave Pierce) entitled Laughing Daughter. It had a three-week run at the Indian Head Center for the Arts, Southern Maryland, United States, from 3 September 2009.

== Illness and death ==
Rick Jones died from oesophageal cancer on 7 October 2021 at the age of 84, in San Francisco, California. He is survived by his wife and daughters.
