= Cynthia Felgate =

British television producer and executive producer

- Born: 8 October 1935; Birmingham, England, United Kingdom
- Died: 2 November 1991 (aged 56); Weedon Lois, Northamptonshire, United Kingdom
- Occupation: Television producer
- Employer: British Broadcasting Corporation
- Known for: Play School

Cynthia Felgate (8 October 1935 – 2 November 1991, was a British television producer, later executive producer.

== Biography ==
Felgate was born in Birmingham, England, and as a television producer she was known for working on childrens programs such as Play School for the BBC and for creating Playdays through her production company Felgate Productions and was also connected to the production of programmes such as Camberwick Green and Postman Pat.

In 1983, she was nominated for a BAFTA for her production work on Play School.

In 2006, a character in the BBC series Hustle was named after her.

She died in Weedon Lois, Northamptonshire in 1991.
