= Derek Griffiths =

British actor and voice artist (born 1946)

Derek Griffiths MBE
- Born: 15 July 1946 (age 80); Woking, Surrey, England
- Occupation: Actor
- Years active: 1964–present

Derek Griffiths (born 15 July 1946) is a British actor, singer and voice artist who has appeared in numerous British children's television series from the 1970s to the present and has played parts in adult television drama.

== Career ==
Griffiths appeared in Play School with fellow presenters/performers including Chloe Ashcroft, Johnny Ball and Brian Cant. A talented multi-instrumentalist, he narrated and sang the theme tune to Heads and Tails, a series of short animal films for children, produced by BBC Television, and sang and played the theme to the cartoon Bod. Another children's-TV role was in Granada Television's early-1980s series Film Fun, in which he played the entire staff of a cinema (the manager, the commissionaire (with the catchphrase "Get on with it, Reg!"), projectionist Reg, usherette Doreen) and also himself, showing cartoons such as Bugs Bunny, Daffy Duck and Wile E. Coyote and Road Runner.

Griffiths appeared on Crown Court (1973) as accused fraudster Raoul Lapointe, from the Belgian Congo. In 1975 Griffiths played Ko-Ko in The Black Mikado at London's Cambridge Theatre. He provided the English voice of SuperTed (the series SuperTed was originally made in Welsh).

In 1997 Griffiths debuted the role of Lumière in the original West End production of Beauty and the Beast at the Dominion Theatre and played the Child-Catcher in the West End run of Chitty Chitty Bang Bang at the London Palladium.

In 2014 Griffiths was presented with a BASCA Gold Badge of Merit award. This was in acknowledgement of his unique contribution to music.

From 2016 Griffiths played Freddie Smith in Coronation Street: he left the role in March 2017 to star in a stage production of Driving Miss Daisy. In 2021, he joined the London cast of The Mousetrap.

== Legacy ==
In 2011 English writer, television presenter, producer and satirist Charlie Brooker wrote,

[As a child] I had an inherent (albeit incredibly condescending) sense that I liked black people, and wanted them to like me. And I genuinely believe a lot of that was thanks to Derek Griffiths. Griffiths was the first black person I can remember encountering anywhere in my life, and he existed only on my television. He presented Play School, appeared in Play Away, and created the music for Bod. And as far as I'm concerned he's one of the most brilliant TV presenters this country has ever produced: instantly warm and likeable, clearly very talented, and possessing the rare knack of appearing to speak directly to young viewers without patronising them. His colour absolutely didn't matter, yet at the same time it did – precisely because it didn't matter. Even this four year old could see that.

== Children's television work ==
- Play School (1971–81)
- Play Away (1971)
- Cabbages and Kings (1972)
- Various Look and Read stories as singer, including:
  - "Cloud Burst" (1974) as singer
  - "The King's Dragon" (1977) as singer
  - "Sky Hunter" (1978) as singer
  - "The Boy From Space" (1980) as singer
  - "Dark Towers" (1981) as singer
  - "Fairground!" (1982) as singer
  - "Geordie Racer" (1988) as singer
  - "Through The Dragon's Eye" (1989) as singer
  - "Earth Warp" (1994) as voiceover and singer
- Bod (1975) where he composed the theme music for each of the main five characters
- Ring-a-Ding! (1975) stories and singer
- Heads and Tails (1978) as voiceover and singer
- Watch It! (1980–83) regular continuity announcer on children's ITV segment for Yorkshire Television
- Insight (1980) as presenter and various characters in this Yorkshire Television educational series for deaf and hearing-impaired children
- Dinosaurs: Fun, Fact and Fantasy (1982) as the voice of Dil the Crocodile
- SuperTed (1983–1985) as the voice of SuperTed
  - The Further Adventures of SuperTed (1989) as the voice of SuperTed in the English language UK version
- Muzzy in Gondoland (1986) as the voices of Bob and Corvax
- King Greenfingers (1989) as the narrator
- The World of Peter Rabbit and Friends (1993) as Simpkin in animated short stories based on the popular book series
- Christopher Crocodile (1993) as the narrator and all of the characters
- Dragon Tales (1999–2005) as the narrator for the audiobooks
- Mio Mao (2005) as the narrator and all of the characters in the UK dub
- Film Fun
- Little Red Tractor (2004–2007) as the voices of Mr Jones and Walter
- Animal Antics (1997–2015) as the narrator
- Tinga Tinga Tales (2010–2011) as the voices of Cricket and Skunk
- Sarah & Duck (2014) Series 2 Episode 3: "Cloud Tower" as Cloud Captain
- Hilda (2020) Series 2 Episode 8: "The Fifty Year Night" as Mr. Ostenfeld
- The Dumping Ground (2021) as Larry Meadow

== Comedy television work ==
- Please Sir! (1968)
- Till Death Us Do Part (1972 Christmas Special)
- The Cobblers of Umbridge (1973) as The people of Umbridge
- Marty Back Together Again (1974)
- Don't Drink the Water (1974) as Carlos
- Battle of the Sexes (1976)
- Hi, Summer! (1977)
- Terry and June (1985) as the Prince
- The Funny Side (1985)
- Porkpie (1995) as Benji
- The Bleak Old Shop of Stuff (2012) as Pusweasel
- Way to Go (2013) as Elroy
- Man Down, Series 4 Episode 5 (2017), as Blind Jim
- The Cleaner (TV series), Series 3 Episode 3 (2024), as Bill

== Other television work ==
- Crown Court (1973) as Raoul Lapointe
- Don't Ask Me! (1974)
- The Black Man in Britain (1974) Presenter: BBC2 documentary series
- Casualty (1999) as Duke Baines.
- Holby City as Greg Martin (2004) and Ted O'Connor (2011)
- Doctors as Renton Miles (broadcast 15 May 2015) and Roger Saintfield (7 June 2022)
- Silent Witness "River's Edge" broadcast 2 February 2016, as DS Malcolm Guillam
- Coronation Street 2016–2017 as Freddie Smith
- Small Axe (2020) as C. L. R. James
- Midsomer Murders (2021) as Rev. Nigel Brookthorpe
- Casualty (2022) as Donald Charles
- Unforgotten, series 5 (2022) as Chris Blackwood
- Shakespeare & Hathaway: Private Investigators (2025) as Mr. Gremio
- Casualty (2026) as Leon Powell

== Appearances ==
- Derek Griffiths appeared in This Is Your Life.

== Advertising work ==
Griffiths has also frequently appeared in advertising. He won an Italian advertising Oscar for a series of comedy commercials about a Christmas cake where he played an entertainer with a French accent.

== Film work ==
- Up Pompeii! (1971) as Steam Slave
- Up the Chastity Belt (1971) as Saladin
- Up the Front (1972) as El Puncturo
- Rentadick (1972) as Henson
- The Alf Garnett Saga (1972) as Rex
- Don't Just Lie There, Say Something! (1974) as Johnny
- All I Want Is You... and You... and You... (1974) as Taxi Driver
- Are You Being Served? (1977) as the Emir
- The Strange Case of the End of Civilization as We Know It (1977) as Bus Conductor
- Watership Down (1978) as voice of Vervain and Chervil
- Rising Damp (1980) as Alec
- Fierce Creatures (1997) as Gerry Ungulates
- Run for Your Wife (2012) as Actor on Swing
- Gallowwalkers (2012) as Mosca

== Theatre ==
In the theatre, Griffiths has been particularly associated with the Royal Exchange, Manchester. His roles include:

- Ko-Ko, The Black Mikado adapted from Gilbert & Sullivan. Directed by Braham Murray at the Cambridge Theatre, London (1975).
- Dick Whittington by Derek Griffiths. World premiere directed by Derek Griffiths at the Royal Exchange, Manchester (1977).
- Athos, The Three Musketeers by Braham Murray and Derek Griffiths. World premiere directed by Braham Murray at the Royal Exchange, Manchester (1979).
- Frontignac, Have you anything to declare? by Maurice Hennequin. British premiere directed by Braham Murray for the Royal Exchange, Manchester at the Roundhouse, London (1980).
- Rick, The Nerd by Larry Shue. European premiere directed by Braham Murray at the Royal Exchange, Manchester (1982).
- Khlestakov, The Government Inspector by Nikolai Gogol. Directed by Braham Murray at the Royal Exchange, Manchester (1983).
- The bluebird of unhappiness by Woody Allen. Directed by Braham Murray at the Royal Exchange, Manchester (1987).
- Feste, Twelfth Night. Directed by Braham Murray at the Royal Exchange, Manchester (1988).
- Oscar, The Odd Couple by Neil Simon. Directed by Ronald Harwood at the Royal Exchange, Manchester (1989).
- Sergeant Kite, The Recruiting Officer by George Farquhar. Directed by Braham Murray at the Royal Exchange, Manchester (1992).
- Lumiére "Beauty and the Beast" Dominion Theatre (1994).
- Feste, Twelfth Night at the Royal Shakespeare Theatre, Stratford-upon-Avon (1994) and the Theatre Royal, Newcastle upon Tyne (1994).
- The Engineer. Miss Saigon, Theatre Royal, Drury Lane, London (1996–1997).
- Sebastien, Nude With Violin by Noël Coward. Directed by Marianne Elliott at the Royal Exchange, Manchester (1999).
- Truscott, Loot by Joe Orton. Directed by Braham Murray at the Royal Exchange, Manchester (2001).
- Harpagon, The Miser by Moliere. Directed by Helena Kaut-Howson at the Royal Exchange, Manchester (2009).
- Rev. Tooker, Cat on a Hot Tin Roof, Novello Theatre, London (2009).

== Audio ==
- Ladybird Books Classic Collection (1995) as Narrator of Tales from The Jungle Book and The Wind in the Willows
- BBC Radio 4 I, Regress (Series 1, Episode 3 - Jan 2012) as Mr Pigeon

== Honours ==
Griffiths was appointed Member of the Order of the British Empire (MBE) in the 2020 New Year Honours for services to drama and diversity.
