= Top of the Form (quiz show) =

British radio and TV quiz show (1948–1986)

- Running time: 30 mins
- Country of origin: UK
- Language: English
- Home station: BBC Radio 4
- TV adaptations: BBC 1 (1962–75)
- Original release: 1 May 1948 – 2 December 1986
- Opening theme: Marching Strings
- Other themes: Fanfare for the Common Man (ELP prog rock version)

Top of the Form is a BBC radio and television quiz show for teams from secondary schools in the United Kingdom which ran for thirty-eight years, from 1948 to 1986.

The programme began on Saturday 1 May 1948, as a radio series, at 7.30pm on the Light Programme. It progressed to become a TV series from 1962 to 1975. A decision to stop the programme was announced on 28 September 1986 and the last broadcast was on Tuesday 2 December. The producer, Graham Frost, was reported to have said it had been cancelled because the competitive nature of the show jarred with modern educational philosophy.

== Hosts ==
- Wynford Vaughan-Thomas
- Lionel Gamlin
- Richard Dimbleby
- David Dimbleby
- John Ellison; he married actress Diana Morrison, with son and daughter, and presented In Town Tonight; he died on 22 August 1975
- Robert MacDermot (died on Saturday 21 November 1964 at Central Middlesex Hospital aged 54, after tripping and falling at London Airport, fracturing bones)
- Kenneth Horne
- John Edmunds
- John Dunn
- Tim Gudgin (1965–86)
- Bob Holness (1974–76)
- Paddy Feeny (1965–86)
- Bill Salmon (Australia 1967–1968)
- Geoffrey Wheeler (1962–75)

== Format ==
Each school fielded a team of four pupils ranging in age from under 13 to under 18.

== Transmission ==
=== Radio ===
- BBC Light Programme from 1948 to 1967
- BBC Radio 2 (sometimes simulcast on BBC Radio 1) 1967–70
- BBC Radio 4 from 26 September 1970 – 1986.

Joan Clark had produced a weekly radio quiz from 1945 called Quiz Team, with two teams of four, with question master Roy Rich. On Sunday 23 May 1948, this transformed into Ask Me, Another! on the Home Service, with teams of four, with question master Lionel Gamlin. Via What Do You Know from 2 August 1953, this became Brain of Britain in 1967.

The programme was largely invented by Joan Clark; she had mostly worked as a reporter on In Town Tonight. When aged 41, she married 47 year old John Peter Wynn, at Caxton Hall Register Office on Tuesday 22 December 1953. Wynn was half-Welsh and half-Danish, could speak seven languages. He would fly each week to Munich or Lausanne for competitions.

John Wynn had worked on Monday Night at Eight on the Puzzle Corner section. He invented the Inspector Hornleigh series, and devised the whole Brain of Britain set of programmes; Top of the Form was the junior version of these. Ask Me Another was later transferred from radio to BBC TV from Monday 9 June 1958, presented by Franklin Engelmann until September 1963. John Wynn wrote the questions for Brain of Britain until the early 1970s, when he retired to Ireland, and died on 20 April 1978. Ian Gillies took over.

The May 1948 radio series began as a knock-out competition for London schools only, where the winning team that of each transmission would appear in the next week's edition.

The radio national competition (but for boys' schools only) began on Sunday 3 October 1948 at 7.30pm on the Light Programme, with London against Birmingham, and with question master Lionel Gamlin, which was won by Owen's School of Islington, who were later beaten by Liverpool Collegiate School in the second round.

After a request from a Northern Ireland listener, girls teams were added, as an experiment. The first girls' schools appeared on Monday 3 October 1949, with the independent Church High School for Girls in Newcastle-upon-Tyne, and the girls' team won that first round, with two girls' schools later topping the England section. Girls' teams would always play boys' teams in the first rounds of the radio competition. The radio editions would be repeated on a Saturday at 12pm from this year, also this was continued in all subsequent years. In the two semi-finals for this first year of girls' teams, three of the four teams were from girls' schools, but only one girls' team reached the final - Grove Park Grammar School for Girls (from north Wales), and the boys' team won the final.

The series first appeared on the Home Service when the first international series was repeated on Monday 29 May 1950 at 11am; this international series had originally begun on 18 April 1950 on the Light Programme. From October 1950, the radio national competition was first broadcast on Tuesdays on the Light Programme, then repeated on Saturday at 9.30am on the Home Service, starting from Saturday 7 October 1950.

The first coeducational schools appeared on Saturday 12 May 1951 in the international Scandinavian Top of the Form, which was for coeducational schools only. This international series was repeated much later in July 1951, on the Home Service; later international and national series would not be for coeducational schools only.

A possible precursor of University Challenge began on the Light Programme on Tuesday 24 April 1956 at 7.30pm entitled Commonwealth Quiz, where teams of four, from universities in Australia and the UK competed, which was produced by Joan Clark. Creighton Burns presented in Australia, with production by ABC (Australian Broadcasting Corporation), and was carried by the General Overseas Service (BBC World Service.

Another similar radio quiz of Joan Clark was called Namesake Towns, on the Home Service on Saturday afternoons, from Saturday 15 November 1958, where teams from towns of the same name in Australia and Britain would compete, again made with ABC of Australia.

=== Television ===
The programme was first aired on TV in two special experiments. The first was on 25 April 1953, featuring Sheffield High School (girls) v. Marylebone Grammar School (boys). A second TV broadcast was performed in 1954 featuring Lady Margaret High School for Girls (Cardiff) v Solihull School for Boys. The programme fully migrated to TV later. It ran from 1962 to 1975, and was called Television Top of the Form. It began on Monday 12 November 1962, when the Controller of BBC1 was Stuart Hood (Scottish).

The questions were set by polymath and author Boswell Taylor on behalf of BBC TV and he was assisted by the BBC's Mary Craig who doubled as the scorer and electronic score board operator. In order to set appropriate questions the selected contestants from each school filled in a questionnaire listing their interests, books recently read and favourite music. The teams from co-ed schools usually included two girls and two boys.

Compared to many television quiz shows in recent years, Top of the Form had a resolutely grandiose outlook; nothing would ever be dumbed down. Consequently, on Monday 18 June 1973 it had its first bilingual competition, with Paris v London. The competition on Monday 25 March 1974 was all in the Welsh language.

In 1967 UK schools took on Australian schools in Top of the Form: Transworld Edition. The following year this was renamed Transworld Top Team, under which title it ran until 1973. Each series involved teams from the UK taking on teams from another country. Countries participating over the course of the run included Canada, The Netherlands, the US and Hong Kong.

In 1975 the TV version moved to 4.10–4.35pm on Sundays, then from 3.55 to 4.20, with the last final on 9 August 1975. One of the producers of the TV version was Bill Wright, who would later devise Mastermind in the early 1970s.

The team chosen to represent the school, on television, was not the choice of the school. In the 1970s, the school put forward twelve people, and the BBC would pick the four best contestants, in terms of personality or charm (and possibly reasonable physical appearance). 1960s biography books have referred to the 'posh accents' of the teams.

== Theme ==
The tune Marching Strings (composition credited to "Marshall Ross", a pseudonym of Ray Martin) was the theme for many years, though for the last few series, Emerson, Lake & Palmer's recording of Aaron Copland's Fanfare for the Common Man was used. Earlier, Debussy's Golliwog's Cakewalk, from his Children's Corner suite, had introduced the radio series.

Marching Strings had been featured in the popular 1956 British film It's Great to be Young! where a music teacher's job was saved by the efforts of his students.

== Incidents ==
In the Heaton High School for Girls, Newcastle, against Leyton County High School for Girls edition, recorded on Monday 5 January 1953, Robert McDermot changed train for Newcastle at Doncaster railway station, but he boarded the wrong train, so he never made the radio recording. McDermot arrived two hours after the recording had finished. Leyton won via a tie break, after being 30-30.

=== Welsh nationalists ===
On Monday 2 April 1973, Ardwyn Grammar School, was to play Cardiff. The Ardwyn team had to go 110 miles to Cardiff, as their recording equipment and vehicle windscreens and lights had been damaged by the Welsh Language Society at the car park of Broadcasting House, Bristol on Friday 16 February 1973, by five male Cardiff University students; vehicles in the Granada Studios car park in Manchester were also damaged by three male students and two female students, causing £1,200 of damage.

The Welsh Language Society, who were often under-occupied female university students, had been issuing threats to Sir John Eden, the radio minister, for a Welsh-language-only network, and others had been targeting holiday homes in Wales. In early March 1973, one of five Welsh female university student protestors in court was the poet Menna Elfyn, whose niece Bethan Elfyn currently presents the Saturday evening show on BBC Radio Wales.

== Termination in 1986 ==
Mid Staffordshire Conservative MP John Heddle, replaced after his untimely death by Michael Fabricant, described the show's ending as 'sheer socialist clap-trap' and 'non-competitiveness'.

=== Subsequent Radio 1 series from 1987 ===
On Sunday 18 January 1987 a new programme appeared on BBC Radio 1 at 3.30pm called Pop of the Form. The theme tune was the old 'Top of the Form' theme tune, but in a synthesised form, arranged by keyboardist/composer Dave Stewart, as Mike Read, the presenter, had always liked the 'Top of the Form' theme tune. The show's producer was John Leonard.

1800 candidates from 600 schools had applied to take part in the 15-week series. Tommy Vance presented the previous show, at 4pm. The first show featured Stephen Day and Joanne Warrant of Mandeville School, Aylesbury against Dr Challoner's High School, who won 54-37, with Jo Hutchinson and Fiona Johnson. With no general knowledge questions being asked, any deficiencies in knowledge, or a school's teaching, would not be broadcast live to the nation. Music questions rarely shone a searching light on any inadequacies of people's knowledge. It was a much more innocuous affair, and would not be likely to be obviously dominated by either grammar or independent schools. Andrew Grimes, in the Manchester Evening News, described the subsequent series as 'just as moronic as I expected it to be'.

When Haybridge High School competed with Sir Thomas Rich's School of Gloucester, the Gloucester audience yelled obscenities at Mike Read. They had taken alcohol on the coach to the broadcast. The Haybridge headmaster, David Hobson, confiscated a bottle of rum from a Gloucester teenage visitor. Some were briefly suspended from the Gloucester school.

A team from Devon and Wrexham reached the final on 26 April 1987, with St David's Comprehensive, in Wrexham, winning 84-76. By January 1988, Simon Mayo hosted the series, with Raigmore Grammar School against Maes Garmon School of Mold on Sunday 9 April 1988, and Mold won. Mike Read returned in March 1989, with Hereford Sixth Form College beating Yale Sixth Form College, Wrexham, in the final, broadcast on 2 July 1989. The following year, Ysgol Maes Garmon beat Hampton School 86-59 in the final.

== Producers ==
Producers have included:

- Paul Mayhew-Archer (1970s), later to produce BBC radio comedy
- Griff Rhys Jones

== Contestants ==
The series tended to feature grammar schools; in later years, as these schools became less numerous, comprehensive schools sometimes featured, but less often, and there was an increasing dominance by independent schools.

However, as comprehensive schools were becoming more commonplace under the Harold Wilson government, the autumn 1967 TV series of Top of the Form featured only comprehensive schools.

=== Top of the Form finalists ===
TX Date	Winning school	Runner-up school	Winning contestants	Additional info
19 December 1948	Royal High School, Edinburgh, won 27-26	High School for Boys, Cardiff	Karl Miller - editor of The Listener (magazine) from 1967 to 1973, John Robson, Derek Pringle, and Anthony Inglis; John wanted to study Maths, and Derek and Anthony wanted to study chemistry, the team was prepared by the head of English, Hector McIver; recorded on Monday 13 December 1948	Cardiff were Brian Morris, 17, captain, David Parry-Jones, 15, later a well-known broadcaster, David Evans, Roderick Rees, 12
9 January 1950	Elgin Academy for Boys, Moray, won 34-28	Grove Park Grammar School for Girls, Wrexham, Denbighshire	Captain – Donald McDonald aged 18 – studied English from 1952–55 at University of Aberdeen and President from 1955 to 1956 of the Scottish Union of Students – NUS Scotland and General Secretary for three years, John Nash aged 13, Alisdair MacLean aged 13, and Clifford Hance aged 15.	Pauline Samuels captain, Glenda Griffiths, Cynthia Jones, and Glenys Bevan
Pauline Samuels studied medicine at Liverpool. As his 21-year-old fiance, in her third year, from 1953 to 1954 she was lady president of the Liverpool Guild of Students, to the president Ron Carruthers, a fourth year 25 year old medical student from Cleveleys near Blackpool, who had completed his national service. They were married on Saturday 24 July 1954 at the Friends Meeting House on Hunter Street in Liverpool, with reception at Adelphi Hotel and honeymoon in Ibiza. Elgin were coached by history teacher William Cowie, from Buckie; Mr Cowie appeared on Brain of Britain in 1959, when a history lecturer from February 1951 at Jordanhill Training College, Glasgow The prize presentation was on Monday 16 January 1950
9 January 1951	Robert Gordon's College, Aberdeen, won 29-28	Manchester High School for Girls	Captain: Bruce McConnach aged 18, the son of Chief Constable James McConnach of Aberdeen City Police, played in the school orchestra; William Innes aged 16, sang in school choir, from Ballater, joined the RAF, flying Canberras at RAF Coningsby; George Tait; and Jonathan Foster aged 12, his father taught English at the school, who studied classics at Aberdeen, then at Balliol College, Oxford);	Manchester were Isabel Sargent, captain, 16, from Romiley, her father taught history at Hyde Grammar School, Freda Walton, 15, Pauline Asbury aged 12, of Briarlands Avenue in Sale, her mother Olive Asbury attended the same school, and Joyce Trafford;
It was recorded on 14 December 1950; both team captains went to Britannic House (not BP) in London on Monday 22 January 1951, which was filmed for Children's Newsreel;
14 January 1952	Morgan Academy, Dundee, won 25–17	St. Dominic's High School for Girls, Belfast	Derek Ruxton aged 13, Ewan Wilson aged 16, and Atholl Hill captain aged 16);	
Atholl wanted to design furniture, played in the cricket team. Derek's father was killed in the Mediterranean in 1940 in naval action. Derek was in the school orchestra. A chairman of a London ice-cream company was so delighted with the exemplary standard of the Dundee team, that he wanted to give everyone at the school free ice-creams. He underestimated the generous offer, when he found out that the school roll was around 1700. Atholl Hill was presented with a prize by Sir James Henderson-Stewart at the BBC in Piccadilly in London, and would appear on In Town Tonight, the next day
9 February 1953	Bangor County School for Girls (The School for Girls), north Wales won 32-31	Leyton County High School for Girls	Gwerfyl Davies, Ann Hughes, and Ruth Powell-Jones captain.	Bangor won by one point; it was the first time that girls had won in the final.
21 January 1954	The Nicolson Institute, Stornoway, Isle of Lewis (boys), won 30–28	The Methodist College, Belfast (boys)	Alisdair Maclean aged 14, son of a teacher, he wanted to study industrial chemistry, from Aird, Lewis, he later studied Technical Chemistry at the University of Edinburgh; Billy McTaggart aged 12, son of Stornoway cinema manager, he wanted to study law, and was originally from Paisley; and Ian Mackay aged 13; all three were patrol leaders in the Stornaway scouts; and captain Ronald Urquhart aged 16, his father was deputy headmaster, and he wanted to be a doctor)	Belfast were: David Moore aged 12, Michael Skinner aged 14, Brian Templeton aged 15, and captain Cedric Thornberry aged 17), it was the first year that islands off the coast of the UK were entered, and one of those teams reached the final.
Stornoway were given a prize on Tuesday 22 June 1954 by Labour MP for Greenock, Hector McNeil. Bruce gained a 2nd in History and Politics, in 1955, from Aberdeen University, and played the tenor saxophone, as a Flying Officer, he married Judy Woodburn of Chalvington with Ripe, East Sussex, they had a son on 22 July 1961. The Methodist College team were given prizes by Brian Maginess, Minister of Finance for Northern Ireland, in June 1954.
9 January 1955	Grove Park School, Wrexham (boys) won 36-33	The Academy, Dumfries (girls)	Michael Burke, Martin Thomas, Eric Stansfield, and Colin Bowen.	Dumfries were Elspeth Mitchell of Nethermill, Sheila Holmes, Lorna Rae of Glencaple, and Margaret Boardman of Goldielea
9 January 1956	Newtown Girls' Grammar School, Montgomeryshire, won by one point	The Royal School, Armagh, Northern Ireland (boys)	Elizabeth Lewis aged 12, Ann Humphreys aged 13, Noelyne Hopkins aged 15, and captain Isabel Stoner aged 16.	
Newtown also appeared on the TV version of In Town Tonight at Lime Grove Studios on Saturday 16 January 1956 with their Physical Culture teacher Mrs Kathleen Arthur. Noelyne Hopkins in the mid-1960s ran a local senior scout unit, and a folk club, and taught at Montgomeryshire College of Further Education; her father, William Hopkins, was the vicar of Abermule, and a Forden Rural District councillor
7 January 1957	Sutton Coldfield High School for Girls, won 37–36	Glanmôr County Secondary School for Girls, Swansea	Brenda Emery captain and head girl aged 17, Angela Clifton aged 14, Diana Herd aged 13 of Wylde Green, and Margaret Scaife aged 12 of Little Sutton	The first victory for an English team since the radio competition had begun;
The finalists played teams from Denmark, Holland and Germany, as would happen the following year; the team were awarded the prize on Wednesday 13 March 1957
2 January 1958	Wycombe High School, High Wycombe	Dr Williams School, Dolgellau	Shirley Sandifer aged 16 of South Heath (Great Missenden), Gillian Davies aged 16, Nichola Adams aged 14, and Susan Rapp aged 12 (The Lee) v (girls: Olwen Davies aged 12 of Leominster).	Dolgelly lost by 4
8 January 1959	The Gordon Schools, Huntly, won 39–37.	South Hampstead High School, London (girls)	David Donald captain, later head boy of 11 King Street, Huntly, Peter Morrison of 19 Seton Drive, Huntly, Eric Rice and Graham White	Stephany Tomalin aged 12, Linda Krause aged 13 of Pinner, Patricia Nabarro aged 17, and Meriel Jagger aged 14
Huntly were coached by head of English James T. Bewich. Eric Rice lived next door to composer Ronald Center. Eric gained a music degree from Durham University in June 1970, and later taught Scottish Traditional Music at the Royal Scottish Academy of Music and Drama (Royal Conservatoire of Scotland from 2011), in Glasgow. David Donald studied Medicine at Aberdeen University from 1959 and married on 16 June 1980
24 December 1959	Mackie Academy, Stonehaven, won 41–35	Rotherham Grammar School	Captain Ian Campbell aged 17 of Inverbervie, Gordon Shanks aged 13 of Stonehaven, James Freeman aged 15 from Kirkside at St Cyrus, and David Stoney aged 12 of Stonehaven; John Bone aged 14 of Glenbervie was replaced in an earlier round as he was rushed to hospital for an appendix operation; Mackie had originally won 41-33, but afterwards Rotherham received two more points, giving 'hog's head', not 'boar's head', as an answer	
The final was recorded on Tuesday 8 December 1959 Mackie were taken on a night out around London by the show producer on 7 January 1960, with their teacher Mr Watt; only Ian had visited London before; they travelled by sleeper train, arriving at 7.30am on Friday morning, and visited London Airport, including the control tower, and the BOAC pilot school, seeing a BOAC Comet; they left the airport at 5pm, and went to Soho, with Joan Clark, and went to a Hungarian restaurant; Saturday lunch was at the Chiltern Restaurant with Joan Clark; they met Prof Henry C. King; before leaving from Kings Cross, they gave Joan Clark, and her assistant Miss Howell, a box of chocolates Mackie were presented with their prize on Wednesday 17 February 1960; John Arbuthnott, 14th Viscount of Arbuthnott of the county council gave them a 30s book token each; at the presentation in the school hall were Miss V Snowie, chairman of Kincardine Education Committee, and Alex Jenkins, the director of education
29 December 1960	Grove Park School, won 53–52	High School for Girls, Dungannon	Josephine Boenisch, Gwenillian Aubrey, Caroline Griffiths (now Beasley-Murray), and captain Veronica Lloyd. Presented with the prize on Thursday 23 February 1961, and given a visit to London	Dungannon were Ann Spotswood aged 16 from Moy, County Tyrone and played the piano, Elizabeth Beatty aged 15, Eileen Mullan aged 13, and Christine McAllister aged 12
21 December 1961	Archbishop Holgate's Grammar School, York	Bishop Gore School, Swansea	Peter Waugh and Geoffrey Blunt	
20 December 1962	Hull Grammar School, won 50-44	High School of Stirling (boys)	Roger Kitching, Kevin Fletcher, Anthony Steel and Charles Read	John Dawson would appear in the March 1964 television final, again on the losing team
22 December 1963	Cambridgeshire High School for Boys, Cambridge	George Watson's College, Edinburgh	Ron Carter aged 12, John Dumbrell aged 13, Ian McGregor aged 15, and Paul Richens aged 17	
20 December 1964	The academy, Montrose, won 46–34	Stafford High School	Morag Cuthbert, Frances Wilkinson, Helen Brett, and Patricia Mandeville)	The trophy was presented on 20 January 1965 by Denis Morris, the head of the Light Programme; recorded at Montrose Town Hall on Tuesday 15 December 1964.
26 December 1965	The High School, Falkirk (boys)	James Allen's Girls' School, Dulwich	Alan Ronald (captain) aged 16, Michael Todd aged 12, John Morris aged 13, and Brian McNeill aged 15.	Scotland had won nine times, England five, Wales four; The Scotsman featured the result in its editorial on Friday 31 December 1965, implying that the success must be largely due to the obvious proficiency of the nation's grammar schools, but noting that for 'less-gifted children', schools often had a shortage of teachers and places.
27 December 1966	The Grammar School, Bassaleg (boys)???	St Martin-in-the-Fields High School (girls)	Roger Panting aged 12, James Pierce aged 13, Stephen Dix aged 15, and captain Christopher Elliott aged 17.	
7 January 1968	Greenock Academy (girls) won 56-51	King's Norton Grammar School for Girls	Shuna Lindsay aged 12, Mhairi Lepick aged 13, Jane Freer aged 15, Joan Hoggan aged 16.	Verity Kemp aged 12 of King's Heath, Jane Herbert aged 15 of Northfield, Grace Baron aged 16 of King's Heath, and Mary Watt aged 13 of Northfield
22 December 1968	Grove Park School, Wrexham (boys)	Leyton Senior High School for Girls		The 21st anniversary series, broadcast from 15 September 1968. The Grove boys were presented at the school Wednesday 22 January 1969 by John Rowley, Controller of BBC Wales, with Aneirin Talfan Davies, head of programmes BBC Wales, and John Ellison, and Joan Clark
21 December 1969	Queen Elizabeth Grammar School for Girls, Carmarthen	The High School for Girls, Stroud lost 47-48		Stroud team - Victoria Harris, Ruth Oliver, Helen Vale, and Sue Williams (captain) from Sheepscombe
2 January 1971	Wyggeston Grammar School for Boys, Leicester, won 43-39	Harris Academy, Dundee (boys)	John Peet – captain – University College, Durham Law from 1971 to 1974 – later chair from 2008 to 2012 of Northamptonshire Healthcare NHS Foundation Trust, John Vale – Lancaster University from 1974 to 1977, Andrew Leak, and Stephen Walton; recorded on Thursday 3 December 1970	
22 January 1972	Cheadle Hulme School, Cheshire	Cardinal Vaughan School, London	Judith Palmer, captain, aged 17 from Goostrey, Ruth Lewis aged 12 from Bramhall, Matthew Cobb aged 15 from Cheadle Hulme, and David Rhodes aged 13 from Cheadle	Judith was the daughter of Henry Proctor Palmer (16 September 1926 - 28 April 1990) and had a mathematician mother, and studied chemistry at Oxford, and was in the local Ranger Guide group, with her older sister Alice.
The prize was presented at school on Thursday 3 February by John Grist (1924-2017), Controller of English Regions. Ruth and Matthew were part of a team of three in the Trans World team. with Andrew Barker aged 17, the Captain of a Scottish team
27 January 1973	The County Girls Grammar School, Newbury, won 53–46	Musselburgh Grammar School	Juliet Weale aged 17, Anne O'Flynn aged 16, Helena Chamberlain aged 14, and Caroline Gibbs aged 13);	The final was recorded in November 1972, and the trophy awarded on Monday 29 January 1973 at the school.
20 February 1974	Kirkcudbright Academy, Kirkcudbright, won by 2 points	Broadoak School, Weston-super-Mare	Ian Wallace aged 17, Margaret Hepburn aged 15, Wendy McGibbon aged 13, and David Anderson aged 12	The trophy was presented at the school on Thursday 7 February 1974 by Robert Coulter, a presenter of BBC Radio Scotland. It was the 11th Scottish school to win.
4 January 1975	The Grammar School, Cheltenham	Magdalen College School, Brackley		Brackley were Captain Michael Ipgrave, aged 16, Marni Burfitt, aged 15, Alison de Verteuil, aged 13, and David Seaman, aged 12, being coached by teachers Clive Waind and Rosemary Davies
20 February 1976	King William's College, Isle of Man, won	Paisley Grammar School, Scotland	Isle of Man were captain Jonathan Hudson aged 18, Bryan Hartley aged 15, Graham Davies 13, and Richard James aged 12	Paisley were captain Jean Lauder, Ian Watson, Amy Donald and Gordon McMillan
22 February 1977	Macclesfield County High School for Girls, won 44-43	Magnus Grammar School, Newark-on-Trent	Captain Elaine Scragg later competed in the 1978 Supermind, she studied music at Durham, where she played the bassoon, and is now Elaine Crook; Susan Boon aged 12, Beth Leach aged 14, and Jill Barnes aged 15	The Newark team was captain Michael Furness aged 18, Andrew Collins aged 12, Julian Spicer aged 14, and Martin Yates aged 16; Terry White was their teacher who organised, and he went there, with local their local Labour MP
The final was recorded on 9 February; the trophy was presented by Prime Minister Jim Callaghan, with ninety minutes at his home on Monday 7 March 1977, with boys from Newark, and their headmistress Beryl Footman, after having lunch at the House of Commons with their local MP; teacher Margaret Biddle, who organised the team, also went;
23 February 1978	Wellington School, Somerset won 49-48	Collingwood School	All boarders except Peter Thompson, 14, of Taunton, others were Stephen Connor, 12, father in the Army in Germany, Nicholas Neale, 16, from Twyford, and Andrew Cullum, 17, of London; the school was direct grant, and went independent from September 1978	The final was recorded on Friday 10 February 1978 Collingwood were James Oates aged 12, Ian Ashurst aged 14, Nicholas Hird aged 15, and Graham Osgood aged 18, captain.
25 December 1978	Brinkburn Comprehensive School, Hartlepool (Hartlepool Sixth Form College from 1985) won 39-37	St Patrick's High School (St Patrick's Grammar School, Downpatrick)	Joy Bowes captain aged 17, born 9 February 1961, of 194 Stockton Rd, Janet Rigg aged 16, Andrew Hainsworth aged 14, and Nicholas Smith aged 12;	Hartlepool won because Downpatrick did not know where Vladivostok was, but Joy Bowes did.
The Hartlepool team were coached by German teacher Dennis Ball, and Latin teacher John Hogg; a local businessman gave £30 to be 'spent on the team'; it was the first, and last time, that a team from the North East would win, and the first comprehensive school to win; presented with the trophy on Tuesday 8 May 1979 by Hal Bethell, station manager of BBC Radio Cleveland
4 February 1980	Chislehurst and Sidcup Grammar School, won 74–68	Peterhead Academy		Richard Aitken aged 17, Dianne Ralph aged 12, and Donna Kinlan aged 14; Donna became Head Girl.
23 December 1980	Wycombe High School, High Wycombe	Simon Langton Grammar School for Boys	Barbara Page, Claire Wilful, Julie Bungey, and Sarah Graves.	The trophy was presented by Mark Carlisle, the Secretary of State for Education.
22 December 1981	Girvan Academy	?	Kenneth Brown, Murray Pratt, Kirsteen Browning, and Marie Walker.	The trophy was awarded by George Younger, Secretary of State for Scotland.
21 December 1982	Seaford Head School, Seaford, won 74-70	Exeter School	Fiona Hanley, aged 12, Sean Hanley, aged 14 of Steyne Rd, Neal Dench aged 16 of East St, and captain Philip Barden, aged 17 of Downs Rd. Recorded on Wednesday 8 December. Coached by English teacher John Mockler. Philip Barden studied Maths at Cambridge.	The trophy was awarded by Keith Joseph, Secretary of State for Education. Exeter were Tim Buckley, Will Clapp and Matthew Rosseinsky
14 December 1983	Emmbrook Comprehensive School, Wokingham	Colchester County High School for Girls	Sarah Lowe, Katherine James aged 12, sixth formers Jameson Wooders and David Bryant.	The trophy was awarded by Sebastian Coe; in one of the earlier rounds, Emmbrook scored the second-highest points total ever for the competition, against a school from Nottingham; Emmbrook had been coached by teacher Mrs Merise Corbett, and the programme was recorded on Wednesday 7 December, being a cliffhanging final.
19 December 1984	City of Leeds School	Moorhead High School, Accrington		
16 December 1985	Upton Grammar School, Slough	Pilgrim Upper School, Bedford	Bedford were Simon Wallis aged 17, Catherine Zvegintzov aged 16, James Gell aged 15, and Paul Holbrook aged 13	
1 December 1986	Christ College, Brecon		Oli Hide, Andy Li – captain, Gavin Doig, and Robin Pinniger.	The trophy was awarded by Sir David Attenborough in January 1987 in London.

=== Television Top of the Form finalists ===
TX Date	Winning school	Runner-up school	Winning contestants	Additional info
24 December 1962	Kingston Grammar School for Boys	Grove Park School for Boys, Wrexham	Ian White – Philosophy at St John's College, Oxford	
1 May 1963	Royal Belfast Academical Institution (boys), won 39–33	The Grammar School for Girls, Weston-super-Mare	Hugh Gibson, Barry Stevens, Harry Cowie, and Bill Smith.	
23 December 1963	Brownhills High School for Girls, Stoke-on-Trent, won 57-53	Hull Grammar School (boys)	Captain Mary Pedley, Jacqueline Bamford, Lesley Steadman and Diane Lawton	A Hull contestant did not know that Ringo Starr was the drummer of The Beatles
Stoke were awarded their prize in January 1964 Mary Pedley, from Burslem, gained a degree in Geography, 2.1, from the University of Liverpool in 1967
26 March 1964	Barnsley and District Holgate Grammar School, won 29-24	High School, Stirling (boys)	Andrew Wood – History at Oxford	Scottish viewers warned the Scottish team to 'watch the little fair-haired fella' of other team, as 'he's dynamite', the smallest of the Barnsley team. John Dawson had appeared in the December 1962 radio final, and Anthony Hughes was the captain for the first television round, but had left the school
10 December 1964	St Joseph's College Dumfries	Portsmouth High School (a direct grant school, not independent)	Kelvin Moneypenny, George Smith, Adrian Ribolla and John Boyle Kelvin became a bridge designer with Arup Group, designing the Chartist Bridge in Blackwood, Caerphilly, and Temburong Bridge	Dumfries won on the last question. 17 year old Adrian Ribolla answered Jean-Paul Sartre to 'Who recently turned down the Nobel Prize for Literature'
1 April 1965	Sutton Coldfield Grammar School (girls), won 43 to 37	Paston School (boys), North Walsham	Alison Mercer captain from Castle Bromwich, aged 17 deputy head girl, studied English; Janet Brown age 14; Mary Nolan aged 13; and Marilyn Black aged 12	16 year old Marilyn Black would join with 12 year old Christine Agg, 13 year old Helen Tyrell, and 15 year old Judith Blomeley on the radio 21st anniversary series on Tuesday 15 October 1968 on Radio 2 against Cambridgeshire High School for Boys, later losing to Leyton Senior High School for Girls in the second round on Tuesday 26 November 1968
30 December 1965	Allan Glen's Boys School, Glasgow, won by one mark	Cathays High School, Cardiff (boys)	David Bogie aged 12, Colin MacNee aged 13, Cameron Rollo aged 15, and William Findlay aged 18, captain	
9 June 1966	Ayr Academy won 51-48	Fairfield Grammar School (boys, Bristol)	Graham Williamson, Dugald Mackie, Douglas McLachlan, and Eric Prentice (captain)	Watched by 8m, on the same day, Peter Dimmock and Bill Wright visited the school to present the trophy. First time that trophy was presented. Fairfield were David Warwick aged 17, captain, Russell Wagerfield aged 15, Richard Gair aged 14, and Roger Allen aged 12
28 December 1966	Leamington College (girls)	Hastings High School (girls)	Marie Bishop age 17 - she wanted to be a doctor, and played the flute in the Warwickshire Youth Orchestra, Elizabeth Wilson aged 15 from Bishop's Tachbrook, Janet Vaughan aged 14, and Vanessa Webb aged 12), Leamington Spa	
The Leamington team were presented with the prize on Thursday 12 January 1967 at the school, from Peter Dimmock of the BBC. Dimmock said that it was the first time that two girls teams were in the final. He said that in the autumn, the show would go international against three Australian cities, and later hoped to compete against US and Canada. Marie Bishop and Elizabeth Wilson both studied medicine at the Royal Free Hospital, and Janet Vaughan studied law at Leicester Polytechnic
28 December 1967	Kirkton High School, Dundee	Burnt Mill School, Harlow	Fiona Anderson, Michael O'Rourke, Morag Smith, and captain Gordon Cobban	
12 June 1969	Torquay Girls' Grammar School, won 61 to 56	Chatham House Grammar School (boys)	Margaret Browning aged 12, Vivien Stuart aged 15, Linda Talbot aged 18, and Sarah Lake aged 14	the trophy was given by sports presenter Peter Dimmock; it was filmed on Wednesday 21 May 1969.
20 June 1970	Salisbury (South Wilts Grammar School and Bishop Wordsworth's School)	Inverness Royal Academy	Alison Greenlees, Andrew Parton, Diane James, and Tom Owen from South Wilts Grammar School and Bishop Wordsworth's School)	Irene Anderson, Andrew MacDonald, Margaret MacDonald, and Charles Bannerman
The finalists competed with teams from the Netherlands in Transworld. Charles Bannerman was later a chemistry teacher from 1977
8 June 1971	Kenilworth Grammar School, won 53–43.	Luton Sixth Form College	Jane Broughton, Alison Love, Ross Beadle, and Martin Clarke	
This was the 10th anniversary series, so the week afterwards, Kenilworth challenged a 'representative team' from the first series
1 August 1972	Llanelli (male and female)	Manchester	Margaret Samuel – Medicine at Barts	The Manchester schools were (St Augustine RC Grammar School of Wythenshawe, and Hollies Convent Grammar School.); the two teams competed against Canadian teams in Trans World.
11 June 1973	Elgin Academy, it ended in a draw 41-41, the tie breaker was won by Elgin	Derby	Wilma Grant studied ecology at Edinburgh University, David Knight of Duffus studied medicine at Aberdeen University, Lynn Scott, and Kenneth Lindsay, studied history and English at Aberdeen University, who was also the son of the director of education of County of Nairn, and later a BBC radio newsreader.	Filmed at Elgin on 16 May 1973 The Derby team were all sixth formers - Anthony Kelk and Paul McCrea from Derby School, and Gillian Duckworth and Jane Sutton from Homelands School;
Derby School had become comprehensive in September 1972; Derby School became Derby Moor Academy in 1989; Homelands School also closed in 1989);
17 June 1974	Queen Elizabeth Sixth Form College, Darlington	Loughborough	John Page aged 17, Lesley Guest aged 18, Valerie Haylett aged 17, and Paul Johnson aged 18	The Loughborough team were two males from Loughborough Grammar School and two females from Loughborough High School, Lucy Stein, Robert Satchwell – 1977–80 Christ Church, Oxford 1st Maths, Anna McKay, and Mark Poole.
9 August 1975	Gower	Leeds		Gower team: Susan Raad, Michael Isaac, Alison Maull, and David Smith. Leeds team: Francis Bruynseels – head boy of his school in 1975, Jane Dougherty, and Stephen Moriarty from St Michael's College.

== International group radio competitions ==
=== 1950 ===
The first international series

- Tuesday 18 April
- Tuesday 25 April
- Tuesday 2 May: Edinburgh beat France
- Tuesday 9 May: Cardiff beat Copenhagen
- Tuesday 16 May: Methodist College Belfast against Brussels; Belfast lost 23 to 22; with Coulter McDowell aged 16, Catriona O'Neill aged 16, Roberta Hewitt aged 15, and Peter Ritchie aged 15
- Tuesday 23 May: Cardiff against Amsterdam

=== 1951 ===
Known as 'Scandinavian Top of the Form', with Norway, Denmark, Sweden, and Finland. Repeated on the Home Service from Monday 9 July 1951 to August 1951.

- Saturday 12 May: London, King Alfred School, London in Hampstead, against Stockholm, Bromma Laroverk; London were Simon Ryder-Smith, Naomi Elkan, Sylvester Bone, and Julie Heyting; Sylvester was the brother of marine biologist Quentin Bone FRS, and the son of artist Mary Adshead; he gained a place at Queens' College, Cambridge
- Saturday 19 May: Cardiff, Whitchurch Grammar School against Oslo, Vallerskole and Fagerborgskole
- Saturday 26 May: Scotland, Boroughmuir Secondary School against Denmark
- Saturday 2 June: Finland against Belfast Royal Academy, with Patricia Lutton, Patricia Potter, George Deans and John Darbyshire, with two schools from Helsinki, recorded on Monday 23 April 1951; John was head boy, and the son of the headmaster from 1943-68
- Saturday 9 June: England against Denmark, Ostersogades Gymnasium, Copenhagen
- Saturday 16 June: Wales against Finland, Normaalllyseo and the Tyttonormaalilyseo, Helsinki

Denmark won the competition

=== 1966 Top Team ===
'Top Team' started on Sunday 10 April 1966 at 9pm, as a radio version of 'Trans World', on the Light Programme. 'Top Team' was a team of the captains of teams in the radio finals, but with only three in a team, over seven weeks, with the final on Sunday 22 May 1966, being repeated from Tuesday 2 August 1966 at 8pm, until September 1966, with three teams from Australia, Canada and the UK (London). Broadcast in all three countries.

- Sunday 17 April: Toronto against Sydney

=== 1967 Top Team ===
Series 2 started on Tuesday 20 June 1967 at 7.30pm, on the Light Programme, with the final on Tuesday 12 September 1967 being Canada against Australia. There were four teams not three.

- 20 June: Sydney against London
- 27 June: London against Wellington
- 4 July: Toronto against Sydney
- 11 July: Sydney against Wellington
- 18 July: London against Toronto
- 25 July: Toronto against Wellington
- Tuesday 12 September Final: Toronto against Sydney

=== 1969 Top Team ===
Began on the new Radio 2, from Monday 23 June 1969, with four teams, with the final on Monday 15 September 1969, with three teams in the final not two teams. Featured Keith Leadbetter, 15 (born September 1953), of the Royal High School, Edinburgh,who later stood in Lothians (European Parliament constituency) in June 1989 for the Lib Dems, gaining 9,222 votes (4.2%). Peter Salt was from Cambridge High School for Boys, from Fulbourn.

- Monday June 30: Toronto against Wellington
- Monday July 14: London against Toronto
- Monday July 21: Sydney against Toronto

=== 1971 Top Team ===
On Radio 4 from early May 1971, with the final on Monday 26 July 1971, with two teams.

=== 1972 Top Team ===
On Radio 4 from Monday 17 April 1972, with the final on Monday 10 July 1972, with two teams. This was the last international radio series, but the international television series continued until September 1973.

== International individual radio competitions ==
- Royal High School Edinburgh against Lycée Henri-IV in France, recorded 20 December 1948, attended by Melville Dinwiddie, BBC Scottish regional director; RHS won 21-18; points were dropped by Edinburgh by believing that the French drank wine for breakfast, not coffee, and the French believed bacon was for an evening meal not an English breakfast
- 21 January 1952, Morgan Academy at Dundee competed with Hamburg Johanneum Gymnasium on Monday 21 January 1952, Kay Roggenkamp, 14, Matthias Drexelius, 15, Jans Scheer, 16, and Peter Hars, 17; Dundee won 23-18; the 1952 Top of Form series had not been requested by the BBC in January 1952, it was quite ad-hoc
- Wednesday 1 July 1953, the first transatlantic competition of the series was on the Light Programme, when Harrow County High School, male and female, competed with the Forest Hill Village Collegiate Institute of Toronto; it was recorded in February 1953, and broadcast in Canada a few days later; it was broadcast to celebrate Canada Day; Harrow won 25-23, with Peter Hirshman, Lionel Needleman, Diane Moore and Marion Weston.
- January 1956, Newtown competed with the girls of Falkonergårdens Gymnasium of Copenhagen, and Armagh later competed against the boys of the Prince Rupert School from Wilhelmshaven, Lower Saxony in Germany
- January 1957, Sutton Coldfield competed against the Netherlands on Monday 14 January 1957; Glanmor competed against Antwerp on Monday 21 January 1957;
- December 1959, Mackie competed with the Lycée Français de Londres and Rotherham competed with the London Central Elementary High School

== International group television competitions ==
In April 1967 Top Team became the TV 'Transworld Top Team' on BBC1

=== 1967 Transworld Top Team ===
Television broadcasting was not by satellite. Live sound was broadcast from the Commonwealth Pacific Cable System (COMPAC, built by the Overseas Telecommunications Commission in December 1963) across the Pacific to Canada. Television was put onto videotape, and the Australian videotape was later flown to London. Three UK teams against three teams from Australia.

- Monday April 17, 1967: London against Sydney, 38-32
- Monday April 24, 1967: Perth Academy against University High School, Melbourne
- Monday May 1, 1967: Liverpool Institute lost 35-37 to Canberra Grammar School, featured Denise Blundell, aged 12, of Victoria Street; Eric Griffiths, 13, of 21 Mauretania Road, Walton; Adelaide Nolan, aged 15, of 39 Rockbourne Avenue, Woolton; and Andrew Bent, Captain, aged 17, of 5 Evered Avenue, Walton
- Monday June 12, 1967: Liverpool against Melbourne

=== 1968 Transworld Top Team ===
- Thursday 18 April: London against Sydney; London included Marian Frost, of 35 Wellington Road, Hatch End, at Harrow Weald sixth form
- Thursday 25 April: Boys and girls of Minchenden School, Southgate, London against Melbourne
- Thursday 2 May: Hillhead High School Glasgow against Melbourne; Hillhead were Hugh Gillespie aged 14, David McKnight aged 17, and Alison Hood aged 15
- Thursday 9 May: Friends' School, Lisburn against Brisbane, recorded April 5, 1968; Lisburn were Hilary Rankin aged 12, Harry Shier aged 13, Susan Rodgers and Martin McClenahan, captain, both aged 18; Harry later studied Maths at Worcester College from 1973; Lisburn won 42-39
- Thursday 16 May: Lisburn against boys of St Aloysius' College (Sydney) and girls of Loreto Convent, Sydney
- Thursday 23 May: Glasgow against Sydney
- Thursday 30 May: London against Brisbane State High School
- Thursday 6 June: Lisburn against boys of Dandenong Technical School and girls of Dandenong High School, Melbourne with Susan Robinson, Phillip King, Dinah Edwards and Tony McDonald
- Thursday 13 June: Glasgow against Brisbane
- Thursday 20 June Final: Lisburn against Sydney, a tie

Lisburn received a prize from Waldo Maguire, head of BBC Northern Ireland.

Three UK teams against three teams from Canada. Each country would host one half of the quiz each. Each competitor received a commemorative sculpture from Canadian sculptor Vickers Head.

- Thursday 31 October: London beat Montreal 26-21
- Thursday 7 November: Belfast against Ottawa; Belfast were Anne Millar of Methodist College, Francis Gaffikin of St Malachy's College, Nicholas Johnson of Royal Belfast Academical Institution, Dorothy Wilson of Victoria College, all aged 17; Frank Gaffikin was later Professor of the Built Environment at Queen's University Belfast
- Thursday 21 November: Glasgow beat Montreal
- Thursday 5 December: Montreal lost to Belfast; the host was CBC Television host Alex Trebek
- Thursday 12 December: Ottawa beat London; the teams could not recall the names of fighter planes in the Battle of Britain
- Thursday 19 December: Ottawa beat Glasgow
- Thursday 2 January 1969: Final, Toronto lost to Glasgow 47-39

=== 1970 Transworld Top Team ===
Made with NCRV of Hilversum, with presenter Kick Stokhuyzen, shown on Nederland 2. It featured Loren lyceum Eindhoven, Geert Groote College in Deventer, and Christelijk Gymnasium Sorghvliet, which educated the Dutch royal family. Five rounds were the in UK, and five rounds in the Netherlands.

On 3 August 1970 Transworld was recorded at Inverness Royal Academy with other teams from Aberdeen Academy and Salisbury; later recorded on 5 August 1970 in Hilversum, Netherlands.

- Tuesday 15 September
- Tuesday 22 September: The Hague against Aberdeen; Aberdeen were Morag Ogilvie, Raymond Berry, Christine Cook, and James Treasurer;
- Tuesday 6 October: Inverness beat Eindhoven 38–27,
- Tuesday 13 October: Inverness beat Deventer 42 to 30;
- Tuesday 20 October: Aberdeen against Eindhoven
- Tuesday 3 November: Aberdeen against Deventer
- Tuesday 10 November: Inverness against The Hague

A Birmingham Post review on 30 September 1970 said – 'very few programmes can boast the education quality and mental stimulus that distinguishes Transworld Top Team'. Hazlehead Academy would be opened by the Queen on Wednesday 7 October 1970.

=== 1971 Transworld Top Team ===
Transworld would be recorded between August 14 and 1 September 1971,

From Tuesday 2 November 1971, until Tuesday 2 January 1972. With Baltimore, Minneapolis and New Orleans against Oban, Kenilworth and Luton.

- Tuesday 2 November: Luton against Baltimore
- Tuesday 9 November: Kenilworth beat New Orleans 52–42,
- Tuesday 16 November: Luton Sixth Form College against Minneapolis
- Tuesday 23 November: Kenilworth beat Minneapolis,
- Tuesday 30 November: Oban High School against New Orleans; Oban were Mary Nicol, Anne Hay, Stuart Ross, and Kenneth MacIntyre.
- Tuesday 7 December: Kenilworth Grammar School lost to Baltimore 47–34
- Tuesday 14 December: Oban against Minneapolis
- Tuesday 28 December: Oban against Baltimore

The final was at the American Embassy.

- The United States of America: Melanie Mattson, Minneapolis; Mark Wilkinson Baltimore; Debbie Rhea, New Orleans; and John Morris, Baltimore.
- United Kingdom: Mary Nicol, Oban; Jane Broughton, Kenilworth; Martin Clarke, Kenilworth; and John Bird, Luton.

=== 1972 Transworld Top Team ===
- Monday 11 September: Winnipeg lost 41-51 to Llanelli
- Monday 18 September: Edmonton against S England
- Monday 25 September: Halifax lost to Llanelli
- Monday 2 October: Winnipeg lost to S England
- Monday 9 October: Edmonton lost to Manchester
- Monday 16 October: S England lost to Halifax Grammar School, Canada
- Monday 23 October: Manchester won
- Monday 6 November: Manchester lost by one point to Halifax, Canada
- Monday 13 November: Final, UK beat Canada

=== 1973 Transworld Top Team ===
UK v Australia. Elgin went to Hong Kong for Trans World, with St George's School, Hong Kong at Kowloon (servicemens children) against three Australian teams An assistant producer on Mastermind, Mary Craig, who kept the scoring total, worked on Top of the Form for ten years and met her husband, an RAF officer, in Hong Kong, on a Transworld episode, marrying in 1975.

- Wednesday 5 September Final: Elgin won

== International individual television competitions ==
- Monday 3 May 1965 BBC1 multilingual (German) Latymer Upper School v Gelehrtenschule des Johanneums of Hamburg, recorded mid-April 1965, it was recorded as two versions, one English one German; Latymer won 38-31 in the English version (John Barton aged 16, Peter Bennington aged 17 of Putney, Stephen Ankers aged 15 of Teddington, Mark Woodland aged 14 of Wandsworth); the German presenter was Hanns Joachim Friedrichs of ZDF
- Monday 18 June 1973 BBC1 multilingual (French), the first bilingual TV quiz, where alternate rounds were English or French, with subtitles against Laurence Meary from Lycée et collège Victor-Duruy, Christian Dors from Lycée Louis-le-Grand, Brigitte Godelier from Lycée Marie Curie (Sceaux), Eric Laboureur from Lycée Jacques Prévert (Boulogne-Billancourt).

== Other television competitions ==
- Tuesday 15 June 1971 Students of the Sixties v Students of the Seventies; the Sixties team: Elizabeth Porter, John Williams, Judith Walker, and Richard Warren

== Notable contestants ==
- Film star Hugh Grant, who represented Latymer Upper School; (v Westminster City School on Tuesday 16 November 1976, first round in the series; v Kingswood School, Bath on Tuesday 11 January 1977, second round; v Macclesfield County High School for Girls on Tuesday 8 February 1977, semi-final; Latymer lost this round)
- Darien Angadi, whose story was told during a BBC Four documentary about the quiz programme
- Vivien Stuart (1969), later a weather presenter and television announcer.
- Hilary Benn, represented Holland Park School in 1969 who were contentiously eliminated in a second round match.
- Robbie Fields, identical twin of Randolph and now owner of Posh Boy Records, was also a member of the 1969 Holland Park School team. Fields was asked the three-point question: "I was born in Valencia in 1867, who am I?" and answered "Blasco Ibáñez", prompting presenter Geoffrey Wheeler to take a deep breath and pronounce the answer correct and leaving viewers baffled.
- 15 year old Derek Reeh of Newbury, who was in the school cricket team, and appeared on Wednesday 28 September 1966 on BBC1 for Newbury Grammar School, with captain 17 year old Harvey Mitchell of Tadley, who wanted to study history; 14 year old Philip Kinns of Speen, who liked stamp collecting; and 12 year old Neil Readmond of Newbury who wanted to be a teacher. Derek Reeh (born 17 January 1951), of Newbury Badminton Club, would study Aeronautical Engineering at Queen Mary College from 1969 to 1972 and would later be an RAF Jaguar pilot, and the chief test pilot for British Aerospace from 1995, flying the first British two-seat Eurofighter Typhoon ZH590 on Friday 14 March 1997 over Lancashire. Dr Philip Kinns (born 4 April 1952) joined Stanley Gibbons in 1970, and has worked with the Royal Numismatic Society.
- Katharine Viner, wife of Adrian Chiles, and Editor since June 2015 of The Guardian, represented Ripon Grammar School in 1986, reaching the semi-finals
- 13 year old Richard Littlejohn, of Peterborough, was in a team of four boys against Kings Norton Grammar School for Girls, broadcast on Sunday 22 October 1967 on the new BBC Radio 2, which was recorded on Tuesday 19 September 1967. Also in the team were Michael Conning aged 12, Martin Bradshaw aged 15 of Walton, and the captain Martin Chambers. It was recorded in the school hall with John Ellison; Tim Gudgin was at Kings Norton.

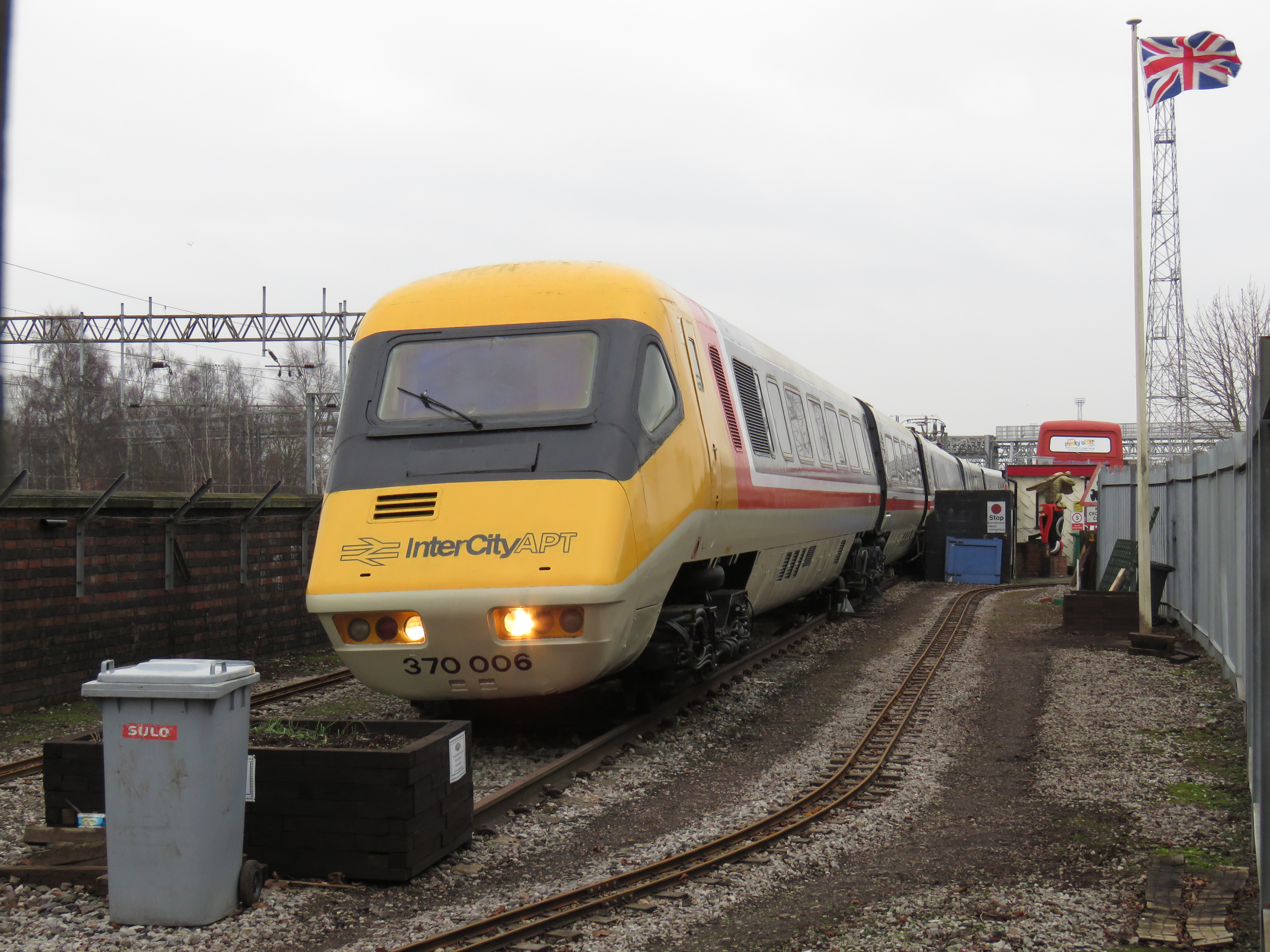
The APT, seen at Crewe, designed by Dundee's Atholl Hill, captain of the 1952 winning team

- Helene Hayman, Baroness Hayman, Labour MP from October 1974 to May 1979 for Welwyn Hatfield - as Helene Middleweek she competed for Wolverhampton Girls' High School on Thursday 19 November 1964 on BBC One; later aged 19, she would be the second female president of the Cambridge Union in March 1969; aged 22 she tried to be selected for Hitchin against the 26 year old Ann Mallalieu, Baroness Mallalieu, the first female president of the Cambridge Union, and also a law graduate from Newnham College, Cambridge but as a 24 year old social worker was selected to fight Enoch Powell on Saturday 25 November 1972, until Enoch Powell stood down as candidate on Thursday 7 February 1974, and despite Enoch Powell casting a postal vote for her, she came second by 6,901 votes
- Sir Julian Lewis, represented Dynevor Grammar School in Swansea, on television in June 1966, losing to Fairfield Grammar School in the semi-finals; Conservative MP since 1997 for New Forest East
- Geoffrey Wainwright, attended Gonville and Caius College, Cambridge, captained the Barnsley Grammar School team in 1956, who lost in the semi-final against Sutton Coldfield girls, who won, being the first English winners

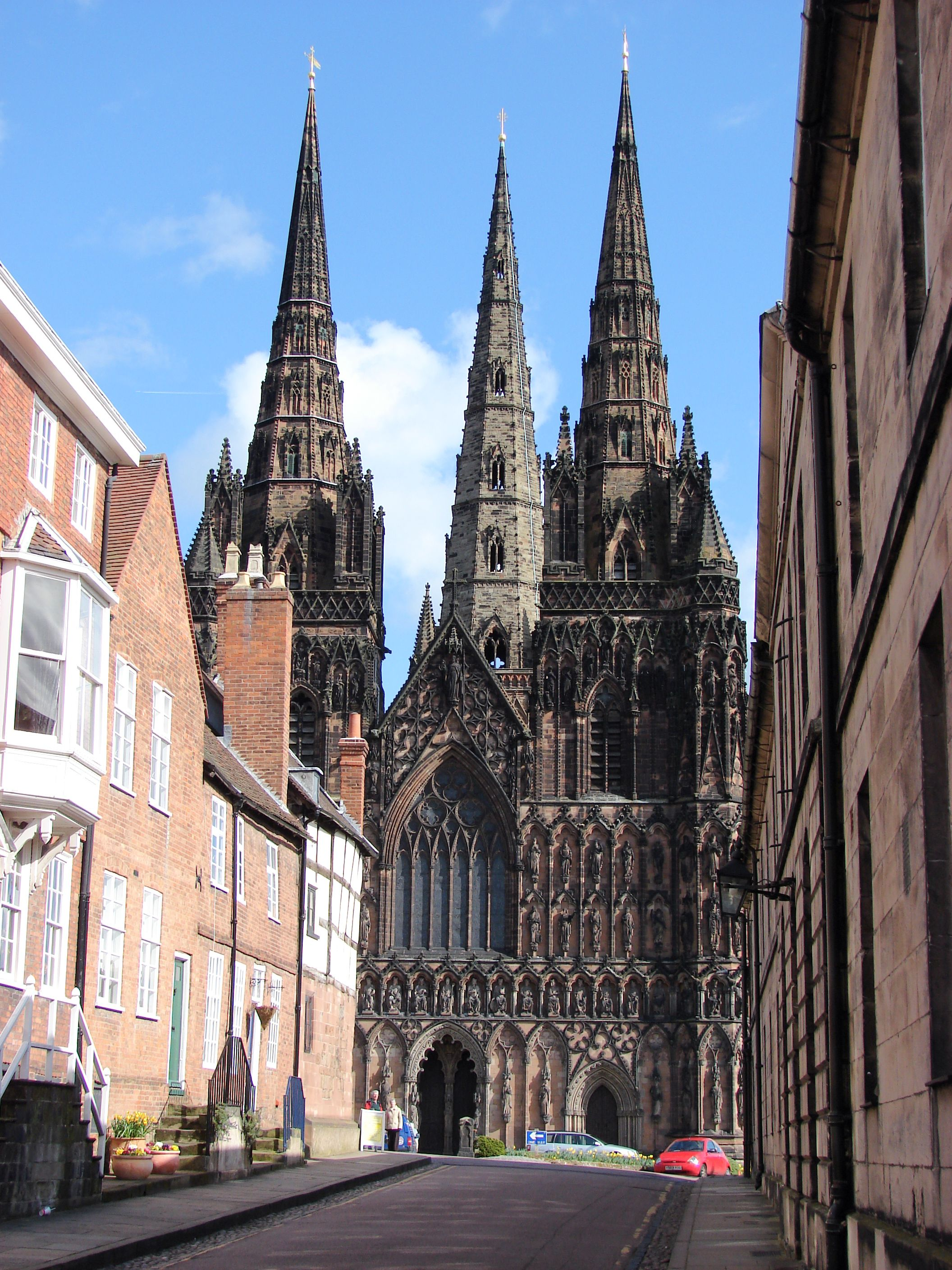
Bishop Ipgrave was captain of his team in the January 1975 radio final

- Michael Ipgrave, captain of Magdalen College School, Brackley, in January 1975, who reached the radio final in January 1975, losing to Cheltenham Grammar School; since 2016 he has been the Bishop of Lichfield
- Atholl Hill, captain of Morgan Academy in Dundee, in 1952, the designer of the Advanced Passenger Train and the British Rail Mark 3 carriage
- Martin Thomas, Baron Thomas of Gresford, of Grove Park School in the 1955 winning team
- Matthew Rosseinsky FRS, chemist, awarded the 2011 Hughes Medal, in the 1982 final for Exeter School
- Hamish Meldrum (born April 1948), Chairman of the BMA from 2007–12, Stirling High School in 1962; took part in the Krypton Factor in 1987
- Diana Condell (29 July 1948 - 8 March 2007), Military medals curator of the IWM for over thirty years, in the Sydenham County Girls School team against Stirling High School, in February 1964
- Judith McCormack, author, took part in 1967 Top Team for Canada
- Nick Utechin (January 11, 1952 - August 17, 2022), captained the Glasgow Academy team in the 1968 Trans World, historian and Radio 4 producer, including Any Questions? in the 1990s
- Adrian Kennedy (rugby union), competed for Foyle College in the Irish semi-final against Royal School, Armagh on Monday November 22, 1948, broadcast on Sunday November 28, 1948, with Richard Dimbleby at Foyle, and Lionel Gamlin at Armagh; Foyle had beaten Grosvenor High, of Belfast, 27-20, on October 3, 1948
- Richard Simpson (Scottish politician) in 1956
- Tom Morton for Marr College in Troon, South Ayrshire in February 1973

== Popular culture ==
Top of The Form was satirised in the 1960s pre-Python television series At Last the 1948 Show.

"Natural Born Quizzers", an episode of Steve Coogan's comedy series Coogan's Run, involved a thinly-disguised version of the show.

In 2008, Dave Gorman traced the history of the show on BBC Four.

A similar quiz for British schools in Germany called Top Marks was broadcast by BFBS Germany.

Top of The Form is name-checked in the song England's Glory, recorded by Max Wall and written by Ian Dury and Rod Melvin.

== See also ==
- Round Britain Quiz, BBC Radio 4's general knowledge quiz from the same era, but mainly for adults, and still broadcast regularly
- University Challenge, a similar Granada Television series for British universities, which was (likewise) taken off the air in 1987, but was brought back (now broadcast on BBC 2) in 1994
- Schools' Challenge – continuing UK inter-schools quiz, non-televised, based on the rules of University Challenge
- Young Scientists of the Year, BBC youth science competition
- Blockbusters – television school-age game show first broadcast in 1983
