= S.G. Hulme Beaman =

British author (1887-1932)

- Born: Sydney George Hulme Beaman; 28 February 1887; Tottenham, London, England
- Died: 4 February 1932 (aged 44)
- Occupations: Author; illustrator; actor
- Spouse: Maud Mary Poltock (m. 1913)
- Children: 2
- Relatives: Emeric Hulme Beaman; Ardern Hulme Beaman; Frank Beaman
- Writing career
- Period: Interwar Britain
- Genre: Children's literature
- Notable work: Toytown

Sydney George Hulme Beaman (28 February 1887 – 4 February 1932), better known as S.G. Hulme Beaman, was a British author, actor and illustrator. He was best known as the creator of the Toytown stories and their characters, including Larry the Lamb. He also illustrated the 1930s John Lane edition of a Strange Case of Dr Jekyll and Mr Hyde.

== Early life ==
Beaman was born in Tottenham, London, on 28 February 1887, the eldest of three children. As a child he was particularly interested in mechanical objects. According to his lifelong friend Hendrik Baker, his attention to detail in his work came from his father.

== Artistic career ==
Beaman attended the Heatherley School of Fine Art, and during that period founded the theatre group known as the Dickens Fellowship, which led to him being invited to perform at smoking concerts. He met his wife, Maud Mary Poltock, during these performances. After his stint there he turned to making wooden toys, taking advantage of the fact that Germany was no longer the dominant force in the industry. He began to weave stories around them, which led to the birth of Toytown in 1928.

May Jenkin, or "Aunt Elizabeth", arranged for his Toytown stories to be adapted into radio plays for Children's Hour, and when they became successful she wrote to Hulme Beaman demanding more. Beaman used to work out his ideas for the show in a miniature theatre at his home, using his original models.

Prior to his creating the Toytown series, Hulme Beaman was already well known for having created the strip cartoon Philip and Phido in 1923. This was about a boy and his dog, and featured early versions of characters later to be in Toytown.

He was often in the studio while his work was being broadcast, and occasionally took part in the programme. This continued until the last Tuesday before his death. Later in his career he was inspired by the early Walt Disney cartoons to create marionette and animated renditions of his Toytown play The Arkville Dragon. He died on 4 February 1932 of pneumonia: however, his plays were remounted for radio until 1964, and his friend Hendrik Baker would adapt his original plays for stage, vinyl and television over the next six decades.

== Bibliography ==
=== As author and illustrator ===
Year	Title	Publisher	Reprints	Ref.
1922	Bunny's New House and The Fire Engine	Thomas Nelson and Sons Ltd. (in The Youngest Omnibus)	1934, 1946, 1952	
1924	Aladdin	John Lane, The Bodley Head	N/A	
1925	The Road to Toytown	Oxford University Press	1938 (in Stories from Toytown), 1979 (in The Book of Toytown and Larry the Lamb), 1985 (in Toytown and Larry the Lamb)	
1925	Trouble in Toyland	Oxford University Press	N/A	
1925	Jerry and Joe	Oxford University Press	N/A	
1925	The Wooden Knight	Oxford University Press	N/A	
1926	The Seven Voyages of Sinbad the Sailor	John Lane, The Bodley Head	N/A	
1927	Teddy's New Job	Frederick Warne & Co.	1928 (in Out of the Ark), 1930, 1934 (both in The Toytown Book)	
1927	Wally the Kangaroo	Frederick Warne & Co.	1928 (in Out of the Ark), 1930, 1934 (both in The Toytown Book)	
1927	Grunty the Pig	Frederick Warne & Co.	1928 (in Out of the Ark), 1930, 1934 (both in The Toytown Book)	
1927	Jimmy the Baby Elephant	Frederick Warne & Co.	1928 (in Out of the Ark), 1930, 1934 (both in The Toytown Book)	
1927	Ham and the Egg	Frederick Warne & Co.	1928 (in Out of the Ark), 1930, 1934 (both in The Toytown Book)	
1927	Jenny the Giraffe	Frederick Warne & Co.	1928 (in Out of the Ark), 1930, 1934 (both in The Toytown Book)	
1927	Pig-Pig and the Three Bears	Oxford University Press	N/A	
1928	Tales of Toytown	Oxford University Press	1930 (as Ernest the Policeman), 1939, 1946	
1929	John Trusty	Collins	1938, 1951	
1930	Wireless in Toytown	Collins	1939	
1930	The Toytown Mystery	Collins	1939	
1938	Stories from Toytown	Oxford University Press (published posthumously)	1942, 1985 (as Toytown and Larry the Lamb)	

=== As illustrator ===
Year	Title	Author	Ref.
1926	These Old Shades	Georgette Heyer	
1930	Three Daughters	Olive Heseltine (as Jane Dashwood)	
1930	The Strange Case of Dr Jekyll and Mr Hyde	Robert Louis Stevenson (originally published 1886)	
1931	The Smith Family	H. C. Cradock	
