= Adrian Kennedy =

Adrian Kennedy may refer to:

- Adrian Kennedy (journalist), Irish columnist and radio presenter
- Adrian Kennedy (rugby union)
- Adrian Kennedy (Hollyoaks), character in Hollyoaks
