= SHCC =

The initialism SHCC may stand for the following, depending on context:

- Sacred Heart Canossian College, a girls-only secondary school in Hong Kong.
- Seaford Head Community College, a secondary school in Seaford, East Sussex, England.
- Shee Hindu Community Centre, a community centre and temple in Tyseley, Birmingham, West Midlands, England.
- Sleepy Hollow Country Club, a historic country club in Scarborough-on-Hudson in Briarcliff Manor, New York, USA
- Singing Hills Christian Church, a fellowship of Christians in Hillsboro, Oregon, USA
