= Children's Favourites =

BBC radio programme

Junior Choice is a BBC Radio programme originally broadcast from 1954 until 1982 with Christmas specials from 2007 to present, with the exception of 2016. Originally broadcast on the BBC Light Programme on Saturday mornings from 9.10 to 9.55 (later, 9.00–10.00), and later BBC Radio 1, and BBC Radio 2, its was first known as Children's Choice, echoing the weekday Housewives' Choice, then from 1954, Children's Favourites.

The programme played requests from children of all ages. For the first 10 years of its run, the programme was mostly introduced by Derek McCulloch, known as Uncle Mac. McCulloch's grandfatherly tone was quintessentially 'old-school' BBC. His opening words "Hello children, everywhere!", his catch-phrase was a modification of his much earlier closing words "Goodnight children, everywhere" on Children's Hour.

Children wrote in with requests often just to get their names mentioned on the radio. McCulloch ensured that all types of music were played whatever the majority had requested: not just children's pieces but a wide range of music from pop to hymns to the light classics. The signature tune until the mid-1960s was "Puffin' Billy" by Edward White played by the Melodi Light Orchestra.

== Later versions ==
McCulloch made his last broadcast in December 1964 and several other presenters were tried including Paddy Feeny, Christopher Trace, Leslie Crowther, and Michael Aspel.

After BBC Radio 1 and BBC Radio 2 were launched, the show was renamed Junior Choice and simultaneously broadcast on both stations. "Puffin' Billy" was replaced as the theme tune by an instrumental version of The Seekers hit "Morningtown Ride" played by Stan Butcher, from his 1966 album a His Birds and Brass, which remained the show's theme until Stewart's last show, the 2015 Christmas Day special. It was then revived on the 2020 and 2021 Christmas Specials with Anneka Rice.

In February 1968, Ed Stewart became the programme's permanent host for eleven years, attracting more than seventeen million listeners. The style became less cosy and less reverent. As tastes changed, new favourites were added; pop records, as opposed to records specifically for children, were requested more frequently as the 1970s progressed. Among the records frequently played were "A Windmill in Old Amsterdam" by Ronnie Hilton, "Hello Muddah, Hello Fadduh" by Allan Sherman and "My Brother" by Terry Scott. The show was peppered with catch-phrase jingles such as "'Ello Darlin'", recorded by an unknown patient at a hospital in Billericay and "Happy Birthday to You" sung by an eight-year-old boy from a football club in Crosskeys, on the team coach after the match. The Ello Darlin' jingle was featured until Stewart's last show in 2015, although Rice did revive it on the 2020 and 2021 Christmas editions.

In 1980, Stewart was replaced by Tony Blackburn, but by this time the programme was seen as somewhat old-fashioned. and the Junior Choice title was dropped in the early months of 1982, and the programme was renamed Tony Blackburn's Saturday/Sunday Show. The children's requests aspect of Junior Choice continued until September 1984 when Peter Powell replaced Blackburn as the weekend breakfast show presenter. The programme was refreshed at this point, and children's requests did not form part of the new programme, thereby removing the link with the "Uncle Mac" era.

In 2007 Stewart returned as host for a one-off programme during Radio 2's 40th Birthday celebrations in September and then what has become a regular Christmas special, starting on Christmas Eve that year, and then every Christmas Day from 2008 onwards (except 2016). The last of these featuring Stewart as host was in 2015, as he died suddenly just two weeks later, aged 74, on 9 January 2016.

After Stewart's death and a hiatus in 2016, the show returned on Christmas Day 2017, with Anneka Rice as its new host, who since then has presented more Christmas Day editions. For the 2018 and 2019 editions, Rice invited young listeners, named 'Junior Choosers', to call in to the show to play a game with her and pick a song. This was then dropped for the 2020 and 2021 editions, which reverted more to the feel of the Stewart era, and had some fellow Radio 2 presenters choosing a song to be played on the show.

== Presenters ==
- Derek McCulloch (1954-1964)
- Various (1964-67)
- Leslie Crowther (1967)
- Paddy Feeny (1967-68)
- Ed Stewart (1968–1979, 2007 special, Christmas editions, 2007–2015)
- Tony Blackburn (1980–82, when Junior Choice name was dropped)
- Anneka Rice (Christmas editions, 2017–present)
