= Derek McCulloch =

British radio broadcaster (1897–1967)

Derek McCulloch OBE
- Born: Derek Ivor Breashur McCulloch; 18 November 1897; Plymouth, Devon, England
- Died: 1 June 1967 (aged 69); Haywards Heath, Sussex, England
- Occupations: BBC Radio producer and presenter Head of children's broadcasting for the BBC
- Spouse: Eileen Barry (m. 1931)
- Children: 2
- Awards: OBE (1964)

Derek Ivor Breashur McCulloch OBE (18 November 1897 – 1 June 1967) was a BBC Radio producer and presenter. He became known as "Uncle Mac" on Children's Hour and Children's Favourites. He was the head of children's broadcasting for the BBC from 1933 until 1951.

== Early life ==
McCulloch was born in Plymouth, Devon, the youngest child of (William) Lionel Breashur McCulloch and his wife, Bertha Russell. The First World War interrupted his education at Croydon High School, and he enlisted in 1915 in the Public Schools Battalion of the 16th Middlesex Regiment at the age of 17. He was wounded at the Battle of the Somme in July 1916 within 20 yards of the German front line. He was then shot by an enemy stretcher party and lost his right eye. During three days and nights in a shell hole, he incurred further injuries from shrapnel. He crawled back to his own lines. He served until 1921 with the infantry, where he was commissioned into the Green Howards, and in the Royal Flying Corps as an equipment officer, including a spell on HMS Valiant.

After the war, he travelled in Europe and South America. He was working for Central Argentine Railway when his health deteriorated, and he returned to England where a bullet was extracted from his lung.

== Career ==
=== BBC ===
McCulloch joined the BBC in 1926 as an announcer. He was the commentator on the first radio broadcast of the FA Cup Final in 1927. His health worsened while working for the Belfast station in 1929 but a job was found for him in Children's Hour. By 1931, he became second-in-command of the programme and took charge of it in 1933.

The programme included talks, plays, music and drama serials. He was appointed head of children's broadcasting in 1933, serving in that position until 1951. He regarded the department as a microcosm of all broadcasting, stating: "Nothing but the best is good enough for children ... our wish is to stimulate their imaginations, direct their reading, encourage their various interests, widen their outlook and inculcate the Christian virtues of love of God and their neighbours." In 1938 he lost a leg as the result of a road accident, and thereafter remained in constant pain.

One of the favourite segments of Children's Hour was S.G. Hulme Beaman's Toytown playlets, in which McCulloch played the central role of Larry the Lamb. In 1939, the audience for Children's Hour reached four million. His signoff line, "Goodnight children, everywhere," became more poignant after the evacuation of many children from their homes at the start of the Second World War. He resigned from the BBC in 1950 due to ill health, and to become the children's editor for the News Chronicle. However, he continued to chair Nature Parliament, which ran roughly every month on Children's Hour.

At the start of his time with Children's Hour, in 1931 McCulloch released a gramophone record on HMV, Uncle Mac's Nursery Rhymes. on which he sang a selection of well-known nursery rhymes.

In 1954, McCulloch returned to the BBC to present a music request programme for children, Children's Favourites, on Saturday mornings. By 1964, the audience for the daily Children's Hour had decreased to 24,000, in favour of television. Despite questions in Parliament, the programme was dropped. The following year, he ceased to present the Saturday show. After his retirement, it was hosted by Leslie Crowther and it became Junior Choice, hosted by Ed Stewart, when the BBC Light Programme was replaced by Radio 1 and Radio 2 in 1967.

=== Writing ===
McCulloch wrote the book Every Child's Pilgrim's Progress in 1956, a simplified version of John Bunyan's The Pilgrim's Progress, which in McCulloch's words was one of the "greatest stories ever written". He also wrote two children's stories, Cornish Adventure (1941) and Cornish Mystery (1950), and gave his name to a series of Ladybird children's books in the 1950s.

He edited a number of children's annuals, variously titled The Children's Hour Annual, Children's Hour Book and Children's Hour Story Book.

== Personal life and death ==
McCulloch was appointed an Officer of the Order of the British Empire (OBE) in the 1939 Birthday Honours. He was the subject of the BBC television programme This Is Your Life in February 1964.

He married Eileen Hilda Barry, a BBC secretary, on 13 June 1931. They had two daughters. McCulloch died at St Francis Hospital, Haywards Heath on 1 June 1967, aged 69. McCulloch was cremated at Bramley, Surrey.
