= Annet Nieuwenhuyzen =

Dutch actress (1930–2016)

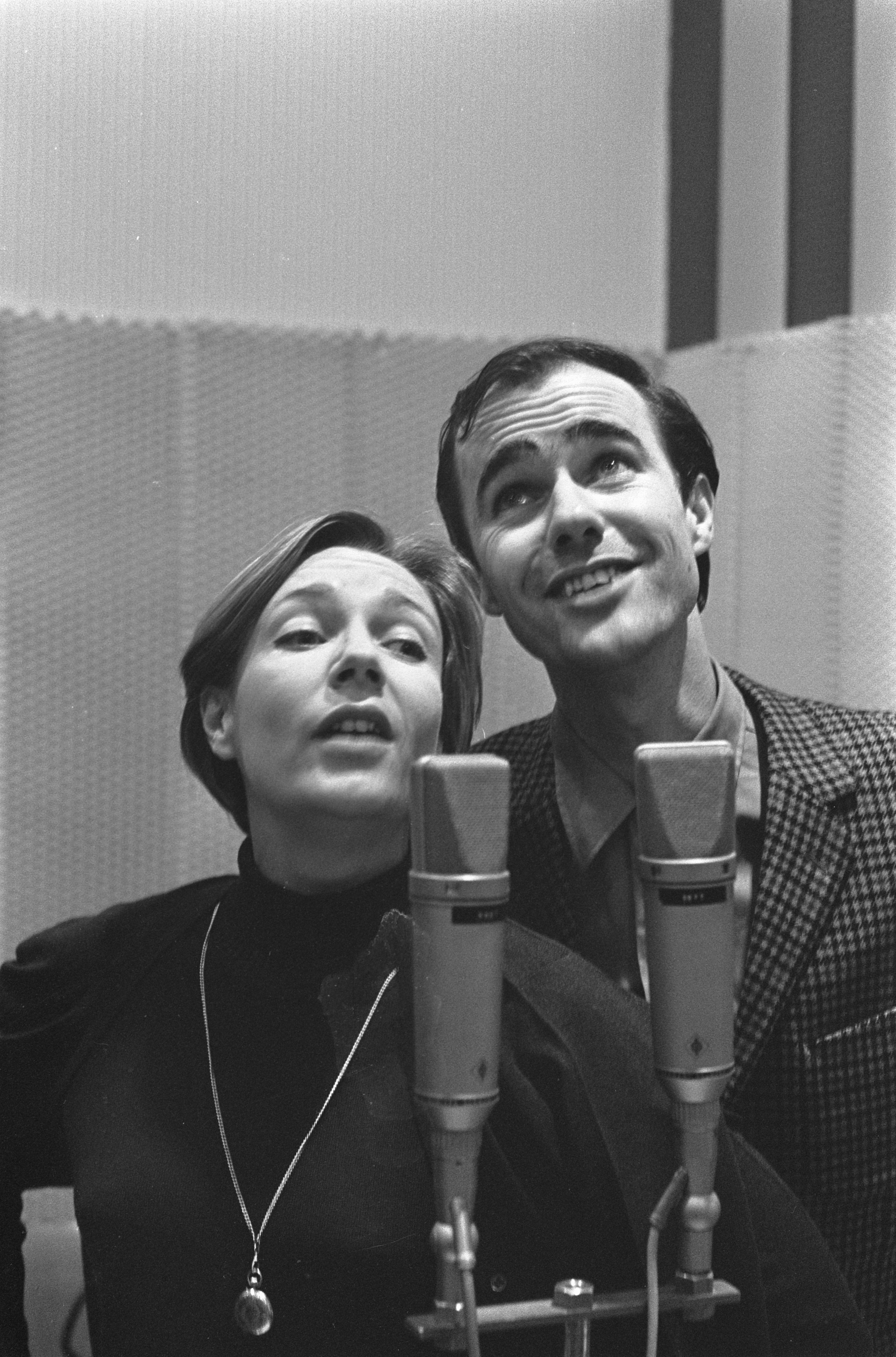
Annet Nieuwenhuijzen and Eric Schneider in 1967

Annet Nieuwenhuijzen (7 November 1930 – 5 August 2016) was a Dutch actress.

== Biography ==
Nieuwenhuijzen was born on 7 November 1930 in Utrecht. She received no formal training as an actress, and her career began in 1953 after being spotted at a student play in Amsterdam. Soon thereafter, she performed at the Haagse Comedie, het Rotterdams Toneel, Globe, Publiekstheater, and Toneelgroep Amsterdam. Nieuwenhuyzen earned the Theo d'Or award twice, in 1965 and 1975. She received the Golden Calf for her role in the film Leedvermaak. A versatile actress, she played tragedies, comedies, and musicals and bore the prestigious Theo Mann-Bouwmeester ring.

Nieuwenhuyzen was long the partner of the television presenter Kick Stokhuyzen. She married theater historian Xandra Knebel in 2012. Nieuwenhuyzen died on 5 August 2016.

== Television ==
- Kleren maken de man - Ellen (1957)
- Het grote begin - Maria Magdalena (1963)
- Een bruid in de morgen - Moeder (1974)
- Een pak slaag - Ans Slieps (1979)
- Afzien - Gwen (1986)
- Leedvermaak - Riet (1989)
- Bij nader inzien - Henriette (1991)
- Suite 215 - Aurora (1992)
- Oud Geld - Guusje Bussink-van Mechelen Liepelt (1998-1999)
- Wet & Waan - Professor Boeschoten (2000)
- Kees & Co - Oude vrouw (afl. Snik, snik, 2006)
- Keyzer & De Boer Advocaten - Fien de Boer (2006, 2007)
- Happy End - Riet (2009)
