= The English Illustrated Magazine =

UK magazine (1883–1913)

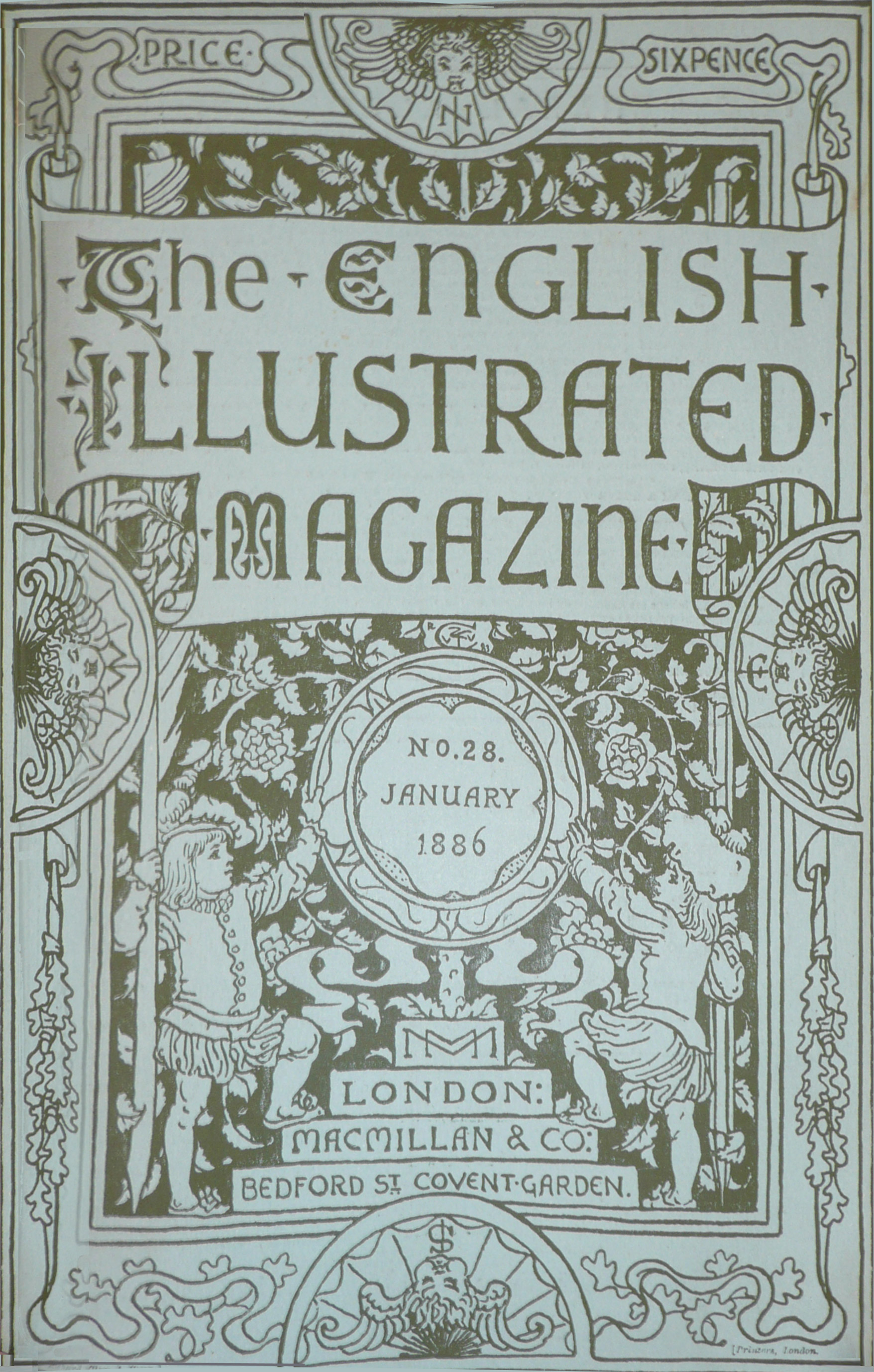
- Front cover for #28 (January 1886)
- Frequency: Monthly
- First issue: October 1883
- Final issue Number: August 1913; 359
- Company: Macmillan (1883–92); Edward Arnold (1892–92); Illustrated London News (1893–98); William Ingram (1898–1901); T. Fisher Unwin (1901–03); Hutchinson's (1903–05); Central Publishing (1905–13)
- Country: United Kingdom
- Language: English

The English Illustrated Magazine was a monthly publication that ran for 359 issues between October 1883 and August 1913. Features included travel, topography, and a large amount of fiction and were contributed by writers such as Thomas Hardy, Henry James, Emeric Hulme Beaman, Stanley J. Weyman and Max Pemberton. Illustrators included Walter Crane, Carlo Perugini, Alma-Tadema, Louis Davis and Louis Wain. When it began publication, it was the only illustrated competitor to Cassell's Magazine.

== Editors ==
- J. Comyns Carr (October 1883 – September 1889)
- Clement Kinloch-Cooke (October 1889 – September 1893)
- Clement King Shorter (October 1893 – August 1899)
- Bruce Ingram (September 1899 – September 1901)
- Hannaford Bennett (October 1901 – March 1903)
- Oscar Parker (March 1905 – August 1913)

== Gallery ==
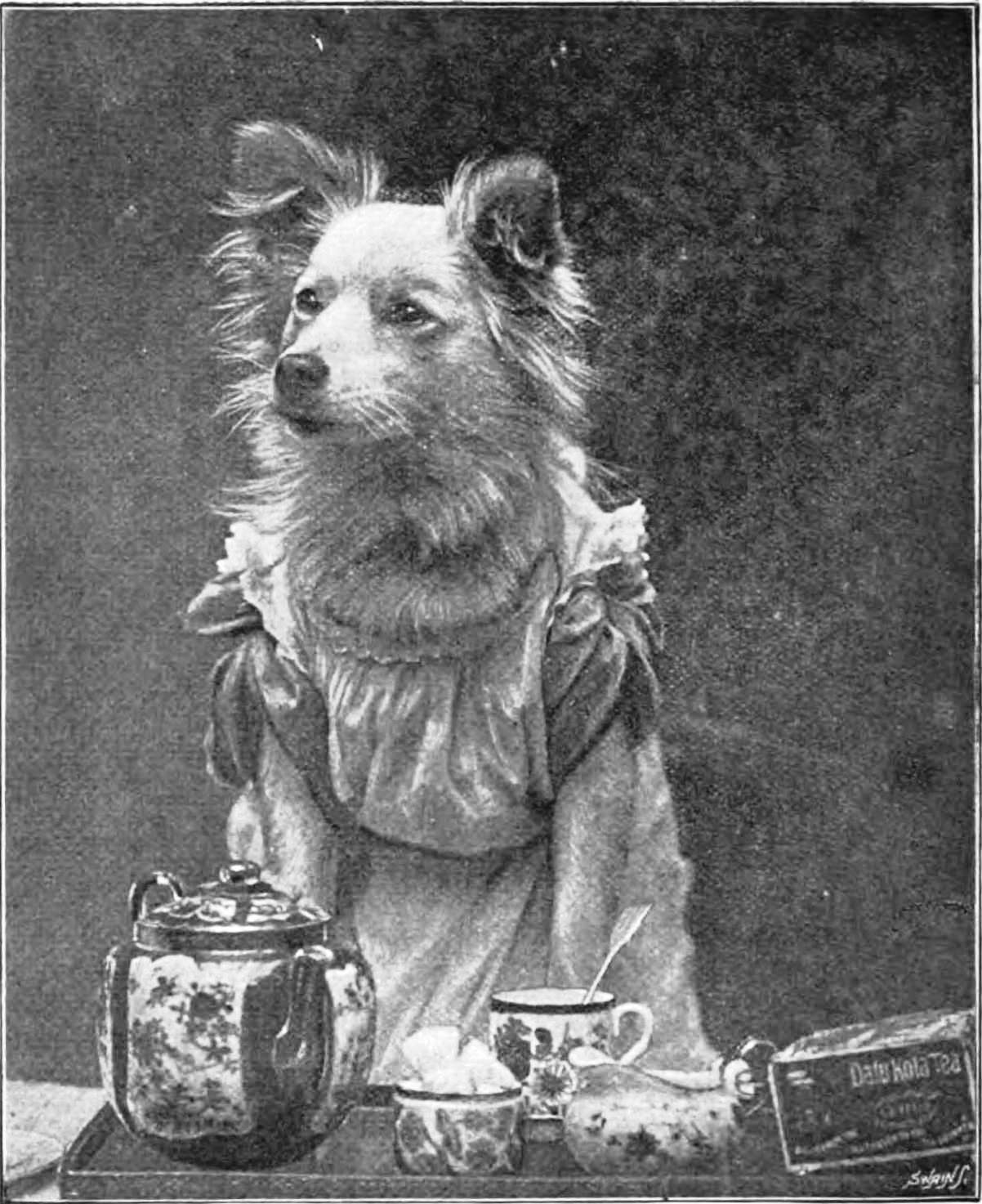
"Come Along, Tea-Time". Dog in dress for the Vol XII October 1894-March 1895.

== References and sources ==
Sources

- "English Illustrated Magazine at the Magazine Data File".
