= Frank Beaman =

Sir Frank Clement Offley Beaman (1858–1928), styled Mr Justice Beaman, was a puisne judge in the High Court, Bombay.

== Biography ==
Born on 27 November 1858, in Hoshangabad, India, where his father was an assistant surgeon in the Indian Medical Service, Frank Beaman was educated at Bedford School and at The Queen's College, Oxford. He entered the Indian Civil Service in 1879 and was appointed as an assistant judge in 1885. He was appointed as special settlement officer in Baroda State between 1886 and 1887, as judicial assistant to the political agent in Kathiawar in 1891, and as judge and sessions judge in 1896. He was appointed as judicial commissioner and judge of the Sadar Court in Sindh between 1904 and 1906, and as a puisne judge in the High Court, Bombay between 1906 and 1918.

Sir Frank Beaman was one of the directors of the Bombay Gazette. In 1911, Sir Pherozeshah Mehta and Benjamin Horniman attempted to purchase the Bombay Gazette, to counteract the influence of The Times of India and to give a voice to Indian nationalists, but their attempts were thwarted by Sir Frank Beaman, leading Mehta to establish a separate newspaper, The Bombay Chronicle, in 1913.

The younger brother of Ardern George Hulme Beaman and older brother of Emeric Hulme Beaman, Sir Frank Beaman died on 12 August 1928.
