= Toytown =

Multimedia series for children

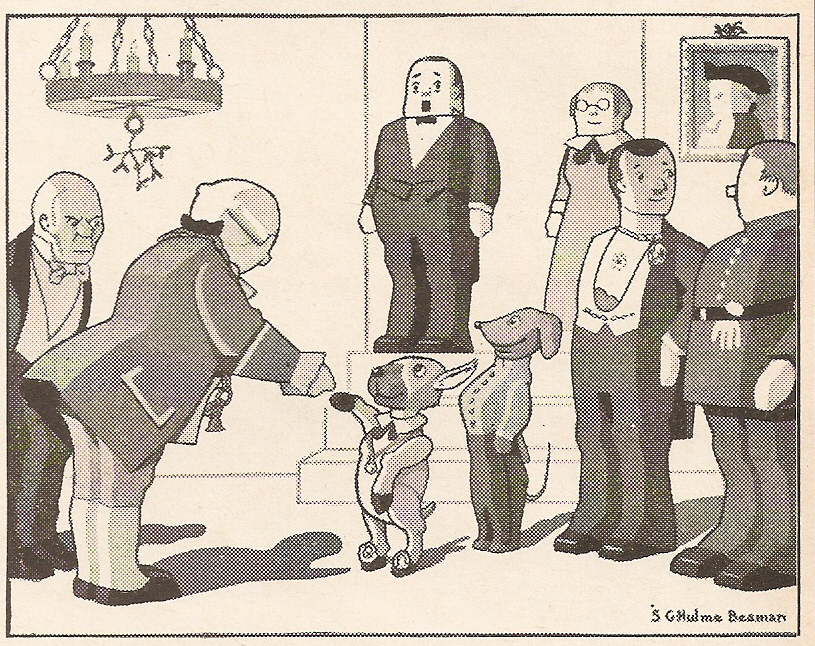
An original line illustration by S.G. Hulme Beaman, depicting (from left to right): Mr. Growser, the Mayor, the Mayor of Arkville’s butler, Larry the Lamb, Dennis the Dachshund, Mrs. Goose, Captain Higgins and Ernest the Policeman.

Toytown is the name given to a series of radio plays written by S.G. Hulme Beaman and broadcast by the BBC from 1929 to 1932, 28 of which regularly repeated on Children's Hour until 1964, by which point it had expanded into a media franchise.

Although he was not the main character of the original works, Larry the Lamb became the main character, together with his clever sidekick, Dennis the Dachshund. Each story involves Ernest the Policeman, the disgruntled Mr Growser and the Mayor. Toytown was perhaps the most famous broadcast children's series at its peak. It consistently headed the votes for Request Week on Children's Hour for thirty years, and was seen in over twenty-seven countries around the world.

== History ==
Around 1928, S. G. Hulme Beaman, originally an actor, began to create wooden toys in light of Germany losing its grip on the industry. These became popular with the children of his local area of Golders Green, and in 1928 he published the book Tales of Toytown, based on them. May Jenkin, who was "Aunt Elizabeth" for Children's Hour, came across the book and arranged for its six stories to be adapted for radio. The plays were successful, with Jenkin writing to Hulme Beaman demanding more, who would formulate them using his original wooden toys.

Although Larry the Lamb did feature in the original stories, he was not the main character. This changed when Derek McCulloch, who narrated the series and voiced him all the way until the end of its run, asked Hulme Beaman to give Larry a bigger role.

Inspired by Walt Disney’s early cartoons, Hulme Beaman experimented with marionettes and animation with Pathé, adapting his radio play The Arkville Dragon for this medium. Sadly, Hulme Beaman died that same year of pneumonia, but the BBC believed the best tribute would be to continue it, so his plays continued to be remounted until 1964, when Children’s Hour ended.

Hulme Beaman's friend Hendrik Baker worked to keep Toytown popular, with a stage adaptation of The Cruise of the Toytown Belle and vinyl records by EMI. In 1956 he founded Larry the Lamb Ltd. to handle the television rights to the plays; producing two cartoon films with Halas and Batchelor (The Showing Up of Larry the Lamb and The Tale of the Magician) before authorising a musical stage play by David Wood and then a stop-motion series networked by Thames Television on ITV and repeated until 1984.

In addition, from 1956 to 1958 Gordon Murray adapted eighteen of the 30 original plays in puppet form, deciding to use rod puppets to emulate Hulme Beaman's original models.

Following Hendrik's death in 1991, Larry the Lamb Limited was dissolved, with his family doubting whether they still owned copyright for the series.

== Characters ==
- Larry the Lamb - The protagonist and best friend of Dennis. Larry and Dennis are very mischievous and the closest thing Toytown has to hoodlums. On one occasion they vandalized the mayor's statue, and on another they convinced everyone there was a dragon on the loose (which by coincidence there really was).
- Dennis the Dachshund. Clever friend of Larry. He speaks with a strong German accent and uses German word-order in his sentences. He is good at turning barrels and spit wheels. He dreams of being an Alsatian and particularly dislikes being called a "sausage dog".
- Mayor of Toytown - Toytown's chief official. He is rather pompous and has had a statue of himself placed in the town square. He has an inferiority complex about his short stature, and on one occasion asked the Magician to make him "big". (He misheard him and turned him into a pig.)
- Ernest the Policeman - Keeps "law and order" but rarely ever arrests anyone. He is always threatening to write down people's names and addresses in his notebook. He considers himself the Mayor's deputy, and on one occasion set himself up as "mayor" while his superior was away on a rest cure.
- The Inventor - A brilliant engineer, capable of making almost anything. On one occasion however he was stumped at how to make an engine for the Mayor's car, and asked Larry and Dennis to provide the propulsion. He suffered the derision of Mr. Growser when this deception was revealed.
- Mr. Noah - Keeps a menagerie of animals in his "Ark", who are usually up to no good.
- Mr. Growser - A disagreeable old gentleman who is always finding things to complain about - usually the behavior of his fellow citizens. His favourite phrase is "It's disgraceful, it ought not to be allowed!"
- The Magician - A sorcerer who makes a specialty of granting people's wishes. In one story Larry becomes his apprentice.
- Captain Higgins - A very disciplinary man, who was originally a sentry guarding the Town Hall. During the Great Toytown War he was appointed Captain.
- Peter Brass - Formerly known as Captain Brass, the pirate, although he later became a decorator; yet he would still be involved in affairs of George the Highwayman and the Scum of Toytown.
- Mrs. Goose - Owns a tea shop, which Larry and Dennis sometimes work in, and has an affinity for Ernest.
- Letitia the Lambkin - A very young lamb, even more mischievous than Larry, who is often given the job of looking after her.
- The Mayor of Arkville - The Mayor of Toytown's rival, who considers his place better, and is often attacked by Mr. Noah's animals.

== Radio plays ==
The first radio performances were as follows:

1. "How Wireless Came to Toytown": 26 Nov 1929
2. "The Sea Voyage": 27 Dec 1929
3. "The Enchanted Ark": 2 Jan 1930
4. "The Arkville Dragon": 27 Jan 1930
5. "Larry the Plumber": 15 Feb 1930
6. "Toy Town Treasure": 10 Mar 1930
7. "The Great Toy Town Mystery! Who Was Guilty?" 1 Apr 1930
8. "The Extraordinary Affair of Ernest the Policeman": 1 May 1930
9. "A Portrait of the Mayor": 30 May 1930
10. "The Great Toy-Town War": 25 June 1930
11. "The Disgraceful Affair at Mrs. Goose's": 20 August 1930
12. "The Showing Up of Larry The Lamb": 19 September 1930
13. "The Kidnapping of Father Christmas, or Dirty Work at the Dog and Whistle": 23 Dec 1930
14. "The Babes in the Wood": 13 Jan 1931
15. "The Start of the Treasure Hunt": 3 Feb 1931
16. "In Which Mr. Growser's Worst Fears Are Realised": 19 Feb 1931
17. "The Wreck of the Toytown Belle", part 1: 3 Mar 1931
18. "The Wreck of the Toytown Belle", part 2: 19 Mar 1931
19. "Toy Town Goes West": 31 Mar 1931
20. "Mr. Noah's Holiday": 21 Apr 1931
21. "Pistols for Two": 12 May 1931
22. "Dreadful Doings at Ark Street": 9 June 1931
23. "Frightfulness at the Theatre Royal": 10 Sept 1931
24. "Golf (Toytown Rules)": 13 Oct 1931
25. "Tea for Two": 3 Nov 1931
26. "Mr. Growser Moves": 15 Dec 1931
27. "A Toytown Christmas Party": 22 Dec 1931
28. "The Brave Deed of Ernest the Policeman": 18 Feb 1932 (later removed from cycle)
29. "The Conversion of Mr. Growser": 22 March 1932

== Television episodes ==
=== 1956-1958 series ===
1. "The Tale of the Magician" - 17 January 1956
2. "The Toytown Treasure" - 16 February 1956
3. "Portrait of the Mayor" - 29 March 1956
4. "The Great Toytown Mystery" - 5 October 1956
5. "Dreadful Doings in Ark Street" - 19 October 1956
6. "How the Wireless Came to Toytown" - 2 November 1956
7. "The Great Toytown War" - 16 November 1956
8. "The Enchanted Ark" - 30 November 1956
9. "Conversion of Mr. Growser" - 11 January 1957
10. "Larry the Plumber" - 4 April 1957
11. "The Showing Up of Larry the Lamb" - 18 April 1957
12. "Mr. Growser Moves" - 2 May 1957
13. "The Arkville Dragon" - 16 May 1957
14. "Pistols for Two" - 13 June 1957
15. "Frightfulness at the Theatre Royal" - 27 June 1957
16. "The Extraordinary Affair of Ernest the Policeman" - 18 October 1957
17. "The Cruise of the Toytown Belle" - 11 September 1958
18. "The Wreck of the Toytown Belle" - 18 September 1958

=== 1972-1974 series ===
==== Series One (1972) ====
1. "The Arkville Dragon" - 18 September 1972
2. "The Tale of Captain Brass the Pirate" - 25 September 1972
3. "The Tale of the Magician" - 2 October 1972
4. "Mr Growser Moves" - 9 October 1972
5. "The Showing Up of Larry the Lamb" - 16 October 1972
6. "Larry the Plumber" - 23 October 1972
7. "The Tale of the Inventor" - 30 October 1972
8. "Dreadful Doings in Ark Street" - 6 November 1972
9. "The Great Toytown War" - 13 November 1972
10. "The Toytown Mystery" - 20 November 1972
11. "How the Wireless Came to Toytown" - 27 November 1972
12. "Tea for Two" - 4 December 1972
13. "The Mayor‘s Sea Voyage" - 11 December 1972

==== Series Two (1974) ====
1. "The Extraordinary Affair of Ernest the Policeman" - 13 May 1974
2. "A Portrait of the Mayor" - 20 May 1974
3. "Pistols for Two" - 27 May 1974
4. "The Enchanted Ark" - 3 June 1974
5. "Toytown Goes West" - 10 June 1974
6. "The Tale of Ernest the Policeman" - 17 June 1974
7. "The Disgraceful Business at Mrs Goose's" - 5 August 1974
8. "Dirty Work at the Dog & Whistle" - 12 August 1974
9. "The Toytown Treasure" - 19 August 1974
10. "The Brave Deed of Ernest the Policeman" - 26 August 1974
11. "The Theatre Royal" - 2 September 1974
12. "Mr. Noah's Holiday" - 9 September 1974
13. "Golf (Toytown Rules)" - 16 September 1974

== See also ==
The Noddy stories, written from 1949 to 1963 for children by author Enid Blyton, take place in a location called Toyland, which in some media is misnamed as Toytown.
