= Co-op Academy Stoke-on-Trent =

Location
- Westport Road; Tunstall; Stoke-on-Trent, Staffordshire, ST6 4LD; England
- Coordinates: 53.05072°N 2.20912°W

Information
- Type: Academy
- Religious affiliation: Mixed
- Local authority: Stoke-on-Trent
- Department for Education URN: 136102 Tables
- Principal: Shane Richardson
- Gender: Mixed
- Age: 11 to 16
- Enrolment: 698 as of February 2016
- Website: https://stokeontrent.coopacademies.co.uk/

Co-op Academy Stoke-on-Trent is a mixed secondary school located in the Tunstall area of Stoke-on-Trent in the English county of Staffordshire.

== History ==
=== Grammar school ===
It was the girls' grammar school, Brownhills High School for Girls.

In the Top of the Form radio competition, a team beat King Edward VI School, Stratford-upon-Avon 49-37 on Monday 10 October 1955, which was recorded on Tuesday 27 September 1955, with the team from Stratford being Richard Tracey, Owen Morgan, Roger Davy, and Richard Wollett. The team competed with a Allerton High School girls team in the England semi-final, on Monday 28 November, and won 39-32, being recorded on November 8 1955. Allerton had previously beaten Grangefield Grammar School, 39-35, with captain Margaret Holmes, aged 17. The team won England final 39-35 on Monday 5 December 1955. The team was Linda Forrester aged 12 of Endon, Christine Blood, Patricia Barnes aged 15, and Ann Holdcroft aged 17, the captain, being recorded on November 14 1955. The team was beaten by The Royal School, Armagh boys team in the UK semi-final, 50-49. The head girl wrote to Cecil W Rodd, the chairman of Walls ice cream, who gave ice creams to 630 girls.

=== Comprehensive ===
It became Brownhills High School.

The school was awarded specialist status as a Maths and Computing College and was renamed Brownhills Maths and Computing College. In September 2010 the school converted to academy status and was renamed The Co-operative Academy of Stoke-on-Trent (later Co-op Academy Stoke-on-Trent). The school is now part of The Co-operative Academies Trust - a group of schools sponsored by The Co-operative Group. In September 2012 the school relocated to new buildings.
