= Young Scientists of the Year =

- Created by: Royal Institution
- Developed by: Sir George Porter
- Presented by: Paddy Feeny, John Tidmarsh
- Country of origin: United Kingdom
- No. of series: 15

Production
- Producer: Peter Bruce
- Running time: 30 mins
- Production company: BBC Science Features Department

Original release
- Network: BBC1
- Release: 7 July 1966 – 15 February 1981

Young Scientists of the Year is a BBC1 television series which ran from 1966 to 1981.

== History ==
=== 1960s ===
The series first aired on Thursday 7 July 1966 on BBC1 at 18:30 and was called Science Fair '66. It was thirty minutes and the first final was on 18 August 1966 at 18:55 and was 35 minutes. The inaugural winners were Michael Breton and Barry Lewis.

The 1967 series first aired on Friday 7 April at 18:15 and was twenty five minutes. The series was called Science Fair '67 and the final was on 19 May 1967 at 18:15 and was forty-five minutes. The 1968 series was first aired on Thursday 11 January at 18:40, and was called Science Fair '68, where the four heats would compete for the title of Young Scientists of the Year, and the programme was twenty five minutes. The final was aired on Thursday 22 February 1968 at 18:15, and was fifty minutes. The next series was first aired on Thursday 16 January 1969 at 18:40 and was twenty five minutes. It was called Science Fair '69, and had six heats.

=== 1970s ===
The fourth series in 1970 was called Young Scientists of the Year, and was first aired on Sunday 18 January 1970 at 14:30, and was thirty minutes. The final was on Sunday 15 February 1970 at 14:30 and was 45 minutes. The 1971 series aired in the Monday at 18:20 time slot. In 1972 the series began on Monday 6 March at 18:20 and was twenty five minutes. The final was on Monday 27 March 1972 and was twenty five minutes. In 1973 it first aired on Wednesday 8 January at 18:45 and was twenty five minutes. The final was on Monday 12 February 1973 at 18:45 and was twenty five minutes. The 1974 series began on Monday 21 January at 18:45 and was twenty five minutes. The 1974 final aired on Monday 18 February at 18:45. The 1975 series began on Tuesday 21 January at 19:00 and was twenty five minutes. The 1975 final was on Tuesday 11 February at 18:50 and was thirty minutes.

The 1976 series began on Tuesday 6 April at 18:55 and was twenty five minutes. The 1977 series began on Sunday 27 February at 16:30 and was thirty minutes, preceding Go With Noakes. The final was on Saturday 27 March 1977 at 16:30 and was thirty minutes. The 1978 series began on Saturday 15 January at 15:40 and was thirty minutes. The 1978 final was on Saturday 5 February at 15:45 and was thirty five minutes. The 1979 series began on Sunday 25 February at 16:00 and was thirty minutes. The 1979 final was on Sunday 25 March at 16:05 and was forty minutes.

=== 1980s ===
The 1980 series began on Sunday 13 January at 16:30 and was thirty minutes. The 1980 final was on Sunday 9 February at 15:15 and was forty minutes.

The 1981 series began on Sunday 18 January at 15:50 and was thirty five minutes. The 1981 final was on 15 February at 15:35 and was forty minutes.

== Structure ==
The original titles to the programme in the sixties were provided by a most unlikely dance/swing arrangement, later replaced by Herb Alpert's "Magic Trumpet" with bracing brass band instrumentation, which were similar to those of Go With Noakes, and the presentation similar to an Open University educational television programme.

It was mainly aimed at people in the sixth-form studying science at A-level. In each heat were three school groups, with two to four people.

In each series there were four rounds, with a final of the four heat winners.

=== Prize ===
The prize was awarded by the Royal Institution, chiefly known for their Royal Institution Christmas Lectures.

=== Presenter ===
The presenter was Paddy Feeny, followed John Tidmarsh.
