= Stan Butcher =

British composer and bandleader

Stanley Robert Butcher (26 January 1920, London – 1987) was a British pianist, composer, arranger and bandleader in the fields of jazz and easy-listening.

== Life and work ==
Butcher served during the Second World War in an infantry division and played in a military band. After the war, he led a band with trombonist Don Lusher in Pembroke Bay; he then worked in the orchestras of Joe Daniels (1947–48), Freddy Randall (1951), Bernie Stanton(1951), Geoff Sowden (1953), Jack Newman (1954) and in the 1970s with Stan Reynolds. In 1949-50 and again in 1952 he led his own groups and wrote arrangements for Dixieland bands. With songwriter Syd Cordell he composed the song "Sing, Little Birdie" for the 1959 Eurovision Song Contest. A recording by duo Pearl Carr & Teddy Johnson reached number 2 in the charts. In 1962 he composed, again with Cordell, for Ronnie Carroll, the British Eurovision entry "Ring-A-Ding Girl", which came fourth. In the 1960s he led the big band His Birds and Brass and recorded easy-listening albums for Columbia and Fontana. In 1979 he issued the fusion album Magician, on the Hobo label, in which Barbara Thompson and Ray Russell participated.

His instrumental version of The Seekers' "Morningtown Ride", from his 1966 album His Birds and Brass, was used as the theme tune for the weekly Saturday morning BBC Radio 1 programme Junior Choice presented by Leslie Crowther and Ed Stewart.

== Discography ==
- At Home With .., Bridie Gallagher and Stan Butcher (Parlophone, 1962)
- Stan Butcher - His Birds & Brass, (Columbia, 1966)
- Sayin 'Somethin' Stupid and Other Things, Stan Butcher & His Birds and Brass (Columbia, 1967)
- Big Band Blowout, Stan Butcher Orchestra (Fontana, 1970), with Don Lusher, Bill Le Sage
- Chaplin, The Hot Strings of Stan Butcher (Fontana, 1970)
- A Garland for Judy, The Hot Strings, arranged and conducted by Stan Butcher (Fontana, 1970)
- Wrappin It Up, Stan Butcher and His Orchestra (Columbia, 1971)
- Magician (1978)

== Other sources ==
- John Chilton: Who's Who of British jazz, Continuum International Publishing Group, 2004, ISBN 0-826-4723-46
