= The Bombay Gazette =

Indian newspaper

The Bombay Gazette (established in 1789), also known as Bombay Gazette, was among the first English newspapers published from Bombay (now Mumbai), India.

== History ==
Initially found in 1789 as the "Bombay Herald", the newspaper's name was changed to "Bombay Gazette" in 1791. It remained the leading paper of the city for a long time and covered important events such as the first session of the Indian National Congress in 1885. The Bombay Gazette and Bombay Courier were the earliest English language Indian newspapers published in Bombay (now Mumbai).

The newspaper continued to be published up to the early 1900s.

The Bombay Gazette started printing paper on silk from 26 April 1841.

Surviving copies of the Bombay Gazette can be found in the British Library (Colindale collection).

== Owners and editors ==
The owners and editors of Bombay Gazette included the British journalist and politician, James Mackenzie Maclean, Adolphus Pope (1821), Fair (1826), Francis Warden (1827), R. X. Murphy (1833), Grattan Geary (1890), Sir Frank Beaman and Galium (1840). It was not unheard of for its proprietors to include British civil servants.

In 1911, Sir Pherozeshah Mehta and Benjamin Horniman attempted to purchase Bombay Gazette, to counteract the influence of another newspaper The Times of India, and to give a voice to Indian nationalists, but his attempts were thwarted by one of the directors, Sir Frank Beaman, which led Mehta to establish a separate newspaper, The Bombay Chronicle in 1913.

== Content ==
Bombay Gazette commenced as a weekly newspaper, in 1825 and was published every Wednesday. After some forty years, it became a bi-weekly. The newspaper contained articles of local interest, especially those concerning Bombay city itself, proclamations, obituaries (mostly of British residents and rich Indians) advertisements and news regarding the British colonial government in India. For instance, on 13 January 1880, Bombay Gazette published a news article -

"A large hyena is prowling about Malabar Hill on the western side between Mr. Nicol's residence and Vaucluse, as good sport as a Mazagon tiger."

It was known to oscillate its stand between extremes of conservative pro-establishment to liberal pro-Indian, based on the opinions of the current editor and owner. The newspaper employed both Eurasian and Indian reporters, and a Parsi reporter for legal articles (Nanabhoy Masani and later, Darashaw Chichghar).
