= Kings Norton Girls' School =

Secondary school in Birmingham, England

Kings Norton Girls' School and Sixth Form

Location
- Selly Oak Road; Birmingham, West Midlands, B30 1HW; England; 52°25′15″N 1°56′07″W

Information
- Type: Academy
- Motto: Opening a World of Opportunities
- Established: 1910
- Local authority: Birmingham City Council
- Department for Education URN: 136590 Tables
- Ofsted: Reports
- Chair: John Abbott
- Head teacher: Nicola Raggett
- Staff: Around 190
- Gender: Girls and co-ed boys in 6th form
- Age: 11 to 19
- Enrolment: Around 1,100
- Houses: Kingfisher, Nightingale, Goldfinch
- Colours: Blue and either red (Nightingale), yellow (Goldfinch) or green (Kingfisher)
- Phone Number: 0121 6751305
- Website: https://www.kngs.co.uk/

Kings Norton Girls' School is an all-girls academy school for pupils aged 11–19. Established in 1910, it is located in Selly Oak Road in Kings Norton within the formal district of Northfield, a suburb of the city of Birmingham, England.

== Curriculum ==
The school operates both a lower school and 6th form provision. The 6th form operates separately as a co-ed and allows boys to attend Kings Norton Girls' School at A level.

Pupils follow a broad curriculum that includes National Curriculum core subjects, GCSE and A-Level. The school offers courses in:

- Art & Design - Textiles
- B TEC Travel and Tourism
- Biology
- Business Studies
- Chemistry
- Computer Science,
- D&T Product Design
- Drama & Theatre Studies
- English Language-Literature
- English Literature
- French
- Further Mathematics
- Geography
- German
- Government and Politics
- History
- Mathematics
- Media Studies
- Music
- Music Technology
- Photography
- Physical Education
- Physics
- Psychology
- Religious Studies
- Sociology
- Spanish
- TEC National Certificate in Sport

The school is involved in a range of partnerships with other schools and colleges locally and internationally, and was designated a Specialist Language College in 2001. It became a Leading Edge School in 2003, and gained a second specialism in Sport in 2006.

In January 2025 the school became a founding member of the West Midlands Academy Trust (WMAT). Alongside Swanshurst School and Hall Green School, Kings Norton Girls’ School has officially become one of the founding members of WMAT. The official slogan of the trust is "Achieving more together".

== Notable alumnae ==
- Felicity Jones, actress (for her GCSEs)
- Alison Kervin, sports editor of the Mail on Sunday, and the first woman in the UK to become sports editor of a major national newspaper.

=== Kings Norton School for Girls ===
- Susan Jameson, actress, married to James Bolam (not to be confused with Louise Jameson)
- Ann Haydon-Jones CBE, tennis player who won seven Grand Slam championships, including Wimbledon in 1969, and BBC tennis commentator
- Brigadier Eileen Nolan CB, Director from 1973 to 1977 of the Women’s Royal Army Corps
- Sheila Whitaker, Director from 1987 to 1996 of the BFI London Film Festival
