= Ardern Hulme Beaman =

British adventurer, author, diplomat and war correspondent

- Born: Ardern George Hulme Beaman; 1857; Hoshangabad, India
- Died: 23 July 1929 (aged 71–72); London
- Occupations: Surgeon, diplomat, and war correspondent
- Title: Deputy Surgeon-General

Ardern George Hulme Beaman (1857–1929) was a British adventurer, author, diplomat and war correspondent.

== Biography ==
Born in 1857 in Hoshangabad, India, where his father was an assistant surgeon in the Indian Medical Service, Beaman was educated at Bedford School. He became Acting British Vice consul in Beirut, Damascus and Cairo, and was engaged at the British Consulate in Cairo in July 1882 at the time of the Bombardment of Alexandria by the Royal Navy. He subsequently attached himself to Lord Charles Beresford, to the headquarters staff of Lord Wolseley, and to Sir Charles Wilson.

In December 1882, he observed the court-martial of Ahmed ‘Urabi on behalf of the British Government, and attached himself to Sir Henry Drummond Wolff and to Lord Dufferin in Egypt. After defending prisoners before the Alexandria court-martial he joined the staff of the London Evening Standard in 1883, and became its correspondent in Egypt, Romania, Serbia, Bulgaria, Russia, Turkey, and Austria-Hungary.

He was the London Evening Standard's war correspondent during the British Nile Expedition, between 1884 and 1885, and during the Cretan Insurrection, between 1897 and 1898. He was the London Evening Standard's Paris correspondent between 1907 and 1916, joining the Intelligence Staff of the general officer commanding British forces in Egypt between April 1916 and September 1921.

A brother to both Sir Frank Beaman, Puisne Judge in the High Court, Bombay, and author-journalist Emeric Hulme Beaman, Ardern Hulme Beaman died in London on 23 July 1929.

== Publications ==
Ardern Hulme Beaman was the author of a life of M. Stambuloff (1895), Twenty Years in the Near East (1898), Pons Asinorum or Bridge for Beginners: A Short Treatise on the New Game of Bridge (1899), English and Continental Bridge (1902), Travels without Baedeker (1913), The Dethronement of the Khedive (1929) and a translation of Leo Tolstoy's Master and Man (1895).
