= Emeric Hulme Beaman =

Writer (1864–1937)

Emeric Edward Jeffrey Hulme Beaman (14 December 1864 – 7 February 1937) was born in Cudapah, India. He was a journalist, mainly writing as a music critic. Together with William Senior Ellis, he wrote four mystery novels under the pseudonym "Ben Strong." He died in 1937. An older brother of his was the diplomat Ardern Hulme Beaman.

== Bibliography ==
- Ozmar the Mystic: A Novel. 1 vol. London: Bliss, Sands, and Foster, 1896.
- The Prince's Diamond: The Adventures of George Travers, Esq., Gentleman. 1 vol. London: Hutchinson, 1898. (sequence of Ozmar the Mystic).
- The Faith that Kills. 1 vol. London: Hurst and Blackett, 1899.
- The Experiment of Doctor Nevill: A Novel. 1 vol. London: John Long, 1900.

=== Short stories ===
- The Basilisk of the Grange "PHIL MAY'S ILLUSTRATED ANNUAL, Winter 1900 - 1901".
- The Sob of the Lay-Figure "PHIL MAY'S ILLUSTRATED ANNUAL, Winter 1901 - 1902".
- Adventures of Archibald P. Batts The English Illustrated Magazine, Volume XXIII (23), April - September 1900 (Five adventure/crime stories) and The English Illustrated Magazine, Volume XXIV (24), October 1900 - March 1901 (Final crime/adventure story in sequence).
