= Kick Stokhuyzen =

Dutch politician, radio broadcaster, television presenter and voice actor

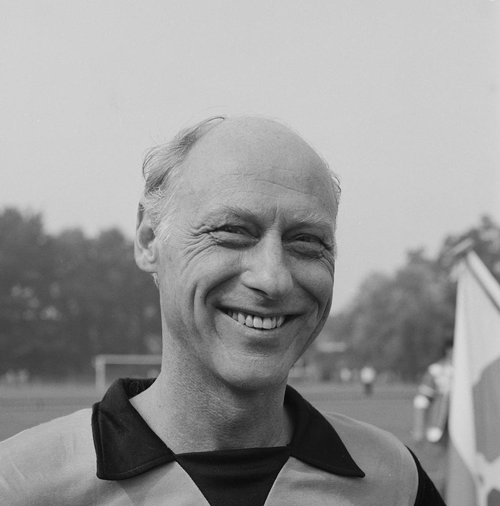
Kick Stokhuyzen in 1981

Willem Anton Frederik "Kick" Stokhuyzen (October 7, 1930 in Soerabaja – January 12, 2009 in Voorburg) was a Dutch politician, radio broadcaster, television presenter and voice actor.
