= Paddy Feeny =

British broadcaster

Paddy Feeny (25 April 1931 – 10 June 2018) was a British broadcaster. He was a presenter of the BBC World Service's Saturday Special (later renamed Sportsworld) programme from 1959 to 1995.

== Biography ==
After working in theatre, Feeny's broadcasting career began at the age of 26, when he was employed by the Midlands Region of the BBC Home Service (now BBC Radio 4) in Birmingham. He moved to the World Service in the late 1950s, and began presenting Saturday Special in 1959.

The Saturday Special feature began with a duration of an hour during the summer months. Slowly its scope expanded, and with football playing an ever bigger role in British life, it became possible to have long editions in winter months also. The programme would run for 2+ hours, sometimes as long as 3 hours 15 minutes, with only two 15-minute breaks for the news on the hour.

The programmes closest to his heart drew attention to humanitarian movements and initiatives. In this capacity, and when covering the Olympic and Commonwealth Games he travelled widely and met and related to people in all capacities of life. One of his programmes led to a book he wrote, The Fight Against Leprosy. He presented other BBC programmes, including Write On..., a selection of reader's letters, and was a regular presenter of Top of the Form on BBC 1, as well as the radio version, and for the BBC Science contest Young Scientists of the Year.

== Later years ==
Feeny retired not long after the death of his wife Patricia Brewer in 1994, and he presented his last edition of Sportsworld in June 1995.
