= Seaford Head School =

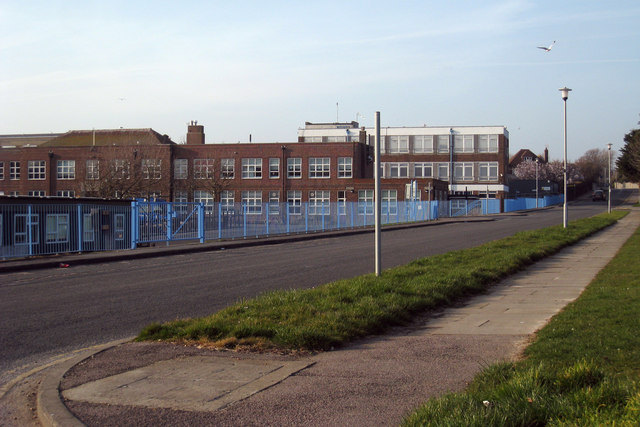

Location
- Arundel Road; Seaford, East Sussex, BN25 4LX; England; 50°46′15″N 0°07′05″E

Information
- Type: Academy
- Motto: Achieving Excellence Together
- Established: 1938
- Local authority: East Sussex
- Department for Education URN: 138473 Tables
- Ofsted: Reports
- Head Teacher: Robert Ellis
- Gender: Coeducational
- Age: 11 to 18
- Enrolment: 1075
- Colours: Navy, light blue, green
- Website: http://www.seafordhead.org

Seaford Head School (formerly Seaford Head Community College), in Seaford, East Sussex, England, is a co-educational secondary school with academy status for students aged 11 to 16 years, with a sixth form centre for students aged 16 to 18.

The school opened in 1938 as Seaford County Modern School, becoming Seaford County Secondary School in 1949. It became a comprehensive in 1972, became Seaford Head Community College in 1993, acquired Trust status in 2011 and in 2012 became an Academy as Seaford Head School. Due to increasing competition from the larger Sussex Downs College conglomerate, the sixth form closed in 2009; a new Sixth Form Centre opened in 2014. The school was in Ofsted special measures from 2004 to 2006. An Ofsted inspection was carried out in October 2010, and the school was judged "Good with many outstanding features" and was reassessed in 2017 and deemed “outstanding”.

The school is a Specialist Science & Sports College, holding the Sport England Award Sportsmark. It also holds the British Council International School Award and the ArtsMark award from the English Arts Council. It is a part of Healthy Schools East Sussex, which promotes healthy eating and lifestyles, and is a member of the Specialist Schools and Academies Trust.
