= Adrian Kennedy (rugby union) =

Rugby union player from Northern Ireland

- Full name: Adrian George Kennedy
- Born: 4 November 1932 Derry, Northern Ireland

Rugby union career
- Position: Back row
International career
| Years | Team | Apps | (Points) |
| 1956 | Ireland | 1 | (0) |

Adrian George Kennedy (born 4 November 1932) is an Irish former international rugby union player.

Born in Derry, Kennedy attended Clooney School, Foyle College and Queen's University Belfast.

Kennedy played rugby for Queen's University RFC, earning Irish Universities representative honours. He also competed for Belfast clubs Collegians and CIYMS. In 1956, Kennedy was capped for Ireland in the back row of the scrum for a Five Nations match against France at Colombes.

A teacher, Kennedy was a boarding housemaster at Methodist College Belfast and later became a senior administrator in the Londonderry County Borough Education Office.

== See also ==
- List of Ireland national rugby union players
