= VI International Chopin Piano Competition =

Piano competition (1960)

Sixth International Fryderyk Chopin Piano Competition
- Date: 22 February – 13 March 1960
- Venue: National Philharmonic, Warsaw
- Hosted by: Fryderyk Chopin Society
- Winner: Maurizio Pollini (Italy)

The VI International Chopin Piano Competition (Polish: VI Międzynarodowy Konkurs Pianistyczny im. Fryderyka Chopina) was held from 22 February to 13 March 1960 in Warsaw. The competition was won by Maurizio Pollini of Italy, becoming the first winner not from Poland or the Soviet Union.

== Awards ==
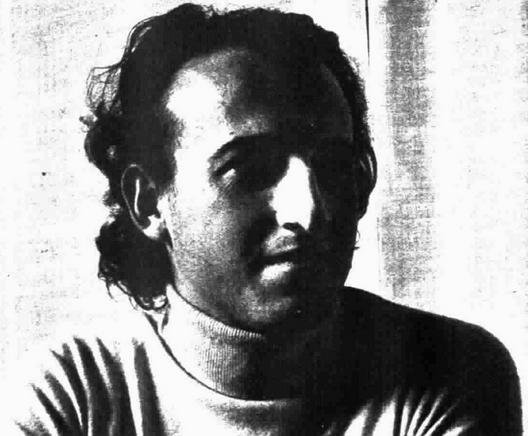
Maurizio Pollini in 1975

The competition consisted of two elimination stages and a final with twelve pianists. Italian pianist Maurizio Pollini won first prize, with Arthur Rubinstein, honorary chairman of the jury, declaring "that boy can play the piano better than any of us".

Audience favorite Michel Block failed to win a prize and only received an honorable mention. Outraged, Rubinstein created a special prize bearing his name on the spot, and awarded it to Block.

The following prizes were awarded:

Prize		Winner	
1st	40,000zł	Maurizio Pollini	Italy
2nd	30,000zł	Irina Zaritskaya	Soviet Union
3rd	25,000zł	Tania Achot-Haroutounian	Iran
4th	20,000zł	Ming-Qiang Li	China
5th	15,000zł	Zinaida Ignatyeva	Soviet Union
6th	10,000zł	Valeri Kastelsky	Soviet Union
HM	5,000zł	Michel Block	Mexico
HM	5,000zł	Jerzy Godziszewski	Poland
HM	5,000zł	Hitoshi Kobayashi	Japan
HM	5,000zł	Reiya Silvonen	Finland
HM	5,000zł	Aleksander Słobodianik	Soviet Union
HM	5,000zł	Józef Stompel	Poland

Two special prizes were awarded:

Special prize		Winner	
Best Performance of Mazurkas	10,000zł	Irina Zaritskaya	Soviet Union
Best Performance of a Polonaise	10,000zł	Irina Zaritskaya	Soviet Union

== Jury ==
The jury consisted of:

- (Italy) Guido Agosti
- (Belgium) Stefan Askenase
- (France) Nadia Boulanger (vice-chairman)
- (Sweden) Sven Brandel
- (Portugal) Sequeira Costa
- (United Kingdom) Harold Craxton
- (Poland) Halina Czerny-Stefańska ( (gold) IV)
- (Poland) Zbigniew Drzewiecki (chairman)
- (Poland) Jan Ekier
- (Switzerland) Henri Gagnebin
- (France) Armand de Gontaut-Biron
- (Socialist Federal Republic of Yugoslavia) Emil Hájek
- (United Kingdom) Arthur Hedley (vice-chairman)
- (Hungary) Lajos Hernádi
- (Poland) Jan Hoffman
- (United States) Mieczysław Horszowski
- (Soviet Union) Dmitry Kabalevsky (vice-chairman)
- (Poland) Witold Małcużyński
- (Finland) Timo Mikkilä
- (Romania) Florica Musicescu
- (Soviet Union) Heinrich Neuhaus
- (Czechoslovakia) František Rauch
- (Norway) Reimar Riefling
- (Poland) Arthur Rubinstein (honorary chairman)
- (West Germany) Heinz Schroeter
- (Austria) Bruno Seidlhofer
- (Soviet Union) Pavel Serebryakov
- (Bulgaria) Andrej Stojanow
- (Poland) Henryk Sztompka (vice-chairman)
- (Brazil) Magda Tagliaferro
- (China) Ding Shande
- (Poland) Margerita Trombini-Kazuro
- (East Germany) Amadeus Webersinke
- (United States) Beveridge Webster
- (Poland) Bolesław Woytowicz (secretary)
- (Soviet Union) Yakov Zak ( (gold) III)
- (Poland) Jerzy Żurawlew
