= Concerto for Violin, Piano, and Orchestra (Mozart) =

Unfinished 1778 composition by W. A. Mozart

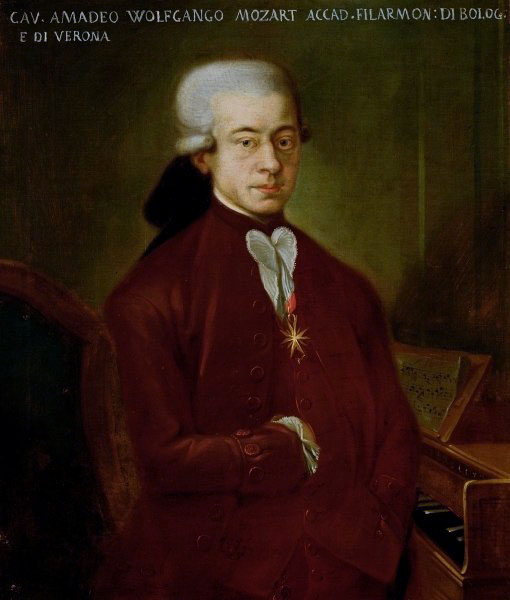
1777 portrait of Mozart

The Concerto for Violin, Piano and Orchestra, K. Anh. 56/315f by Wolfgang Amadeus Mozart is an unfinished work that was written in Mannheim in 1778 on his journey to Paris. It was written for an Académie des Amateurs, a concert that was to take place in Mannheim. Mozart himself was to play the piano part and Ignaz Fränzl, the concertmaster of the Mannheim orchestra, was to play the solo violin part of the double concerto.

Mozart only wrote the first 120 bars of the first movement, and only the first 74 bars are completely scored. Alfred Einstein believed that the work was abandoned due to the disbanding of the Mannheim orchestra; however, that had happened earlier that year when the Elector moved to Munich and most of his orchestra followed him, so the Académie des Amateurs replaced the Mannheim orchestra. The most likely explanation for the concerto being abandoned is that Mozart left Mannheim in December 1778, perhaps because the Académie did not start as early as he thought it would. It is unknown why he did not continue working on the concerto on his journey home or when he was back in Salzburg.

In 1990 the British composer Philip Wilby reconstructed and completed the work for The Complete Mozart Edition. Its premiere recording took place in 1990 with violinist Iona Brown and pianist Howard Shelley with the Academy of St Martin in the Fields conducted by Neville Marriner, which was first issued as part of volume 8 of The Complete Mozart Edition.

The autograph manuscript of the concerto is preserved in the Bibliothèque nationale de France.

== Recordings ==
Conductor	Soloists	Orchestra	Label	Completion
Roger Norrington	Daniel Hope, Sebastian Knauer	Camerata Salzburg	Warner Classics	Philip Wilby
Neville Marriner	Iona Brown, Howard Shelley	Academy of St. Martin in the Fields	Philips Classics	Philip Wilby
	Midori Goto, Christoph Eschenbach	NDR-Sinfonieorchester	Sony Records	Philip Wilby
Kaspar Zehnder	Vladyslava Luchenko, Frank Braley	Biel Solothurn Symphony Orchestra	Fuga Libera	Philip Wilby
Jürgen Kussmaul	Rainer Kussmaul, Monika Leonhard	Amsterdam Mozart Players	Channel Classics	Philip Wilby
Peter Ruzicka	Rainer Kussmaul, Sophie-Mayuko Vetter	Hamburger Symphoniker	Oehms Classics	Fragment
Yoon Kuk Lee	Eduard Okoun, Cyprien Katsaris	Salzburger Kammerphilharmonie	Piano 21	Robert Levin compl. + fragment
Nicholas McGegan	Zsolt Kalló, Rita Papp	Capella Savaria	Hungaroton	Robert Levin
Laurence Cummings	Bojan Čičić, Robert Levin	Academy of Ancient Music	AAM	Robert Levin
