= Tamás Vásáry =

Hungarian concert pianist and conductor (1933–2026)

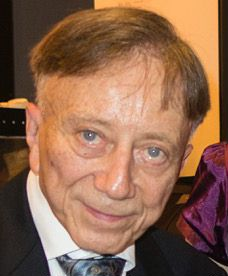
- Vásáry in 2015
- Born: 11 August 1933; Debrecen, Hungary
- Died: 5 February 2026 (aged 92); Budapest, Hungary
- Education: Franz Liszt Academy of Music
- Occupations: Classical pianist; conductor
- Organizations: Northern Sinfonia; Bournemouth Sinfonietta; Hungarian Radio Symphony Orchestra
- Awards: Kossuth Prize; Chevalier des Arts et des Lettres

Tamás Vásáry (Hungarian pronunciation: [ˈtɒmaːʃ ˈvaːʃaːri]; 11 August 1933 – 5 February 2026) was a Hungarian concert pianist and conductor who made an international career, living in Switzerland from 1956 and later in London from 1970. He was known for interpreting music of the Romantic era, especially by Chopin, Liszt and Schumann.

He began as a child prodigy, playing an early Mozart Concerto at age eight and studying at the Franz Liszt Academy of Music from age twelve. He taught there as an assistant to Zoltán Kodály. He was a finalist of both the V International Chopin Piano Competition and the Long-Thibaud-Crespin Competition in 1955, and of the Queen Elisabeth Competition in Brussels in 1956. Due to political unrest, he left Hungary for Switzerland in 1956, recording for Deutsche Grammophon and playing concerts, in the United States from 1961 and regularly at European festivals. He moved to London in 1970 where he began to conduct, becoming joint principal conductor of the Northern Sinfonia and principal conductor of the Bournemouth Sinfonietta. In 1993, he became principal conductor of the Hungarian Radio Symphony Orchestra.

== Life and career ==
Vásáry was born in Debrecen on 11 August 1933. He was a child prodigy, and was accepted to the Debrecen Conservatory after playing Liszt's Hungarian Rhapsody No. 2. He trained with Margit Höchtle, a student of Árpád Szendy. He made his stage debut at age eight, performing one of Mozart's early piano concertos in his home town, where he gave a solo recital the following year, focused on music by Chopin. He then began to play concerts regularly. He was introduced to Ernő Dohnányi, who offered to accept him as a student.

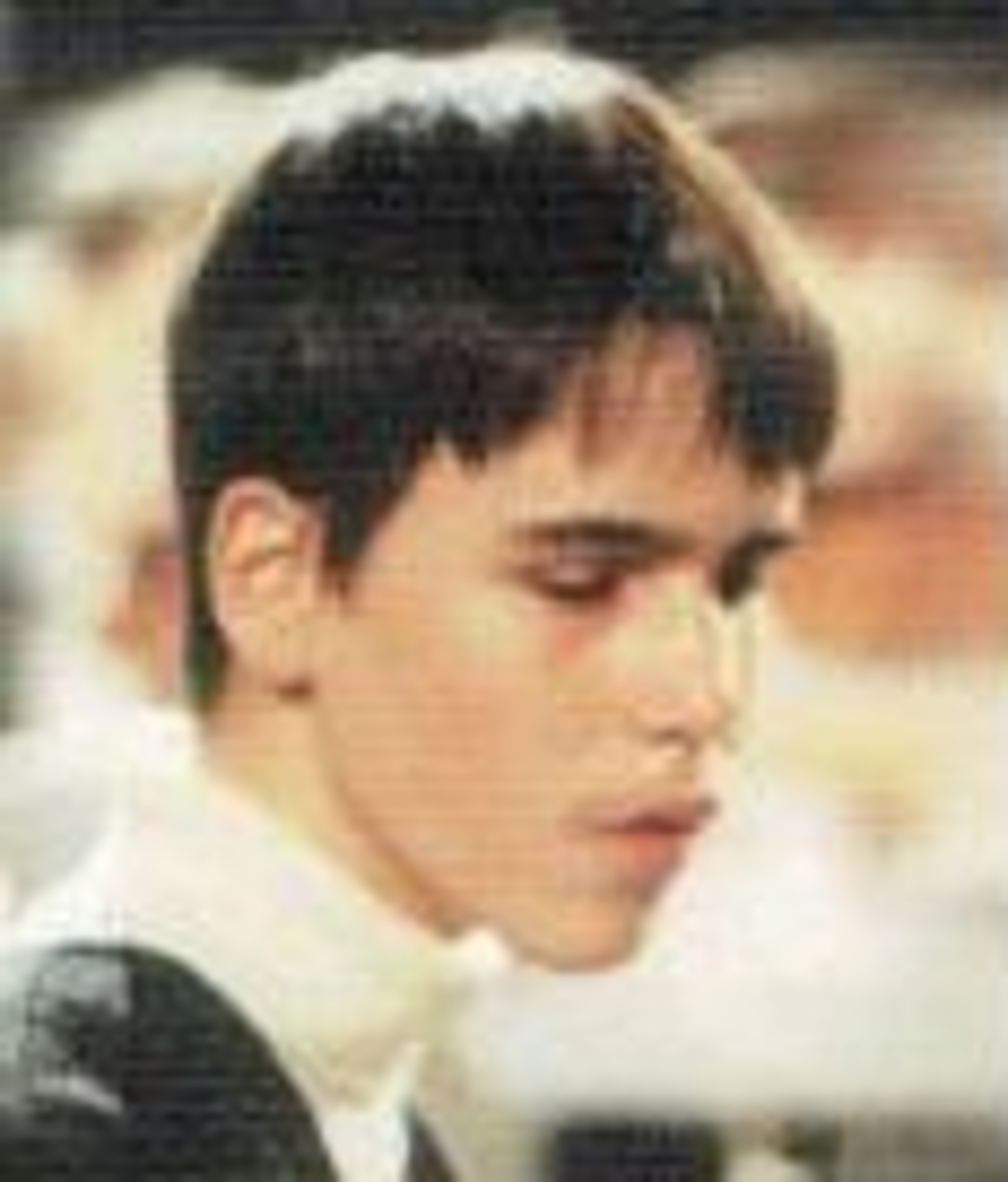
Vásáry in 1943

After World War II, the family moved to Budapest where his father, József Vásáry (1890-1975), became secretary of state in Imre Nagy's cabinet. Vásáry studied with József Gát and Lajos Hernádi at the Franz Liszt Academy of Music, advised also by Zoltán Kodály and Dohnanyi. Aged 14, he won the Academy's Franz Liszt Competition. During political unrest, his father was dismissed from office, and the family restricted to house arrest in the country from 1951. Vásáry contributed to the family income by playing as an accompanist for kabarett and operetta recitals; he belonged to several jazz groups. He studied until 1953 and then served as an assistant to Kodály at the Academy. He performed internationally in Moscow and Eastern Europe. He played Mozart's Concerto for Two Pianos, K. 365, in Budapest in 1953 with Annie Fischer, of whom he said that she "evoked for me the poetry of music". He was a finalist of the V International Chopin Piano Competition in Warsaw in 1955, also of the Long-Thibaud-Crespin Competition in Paris the same year. He was a finalist in the Queen Elisabeth Competition in Brussels in 1956, where Vladimir Ashkenazy, Cécile Ousset and Lazar Berman also competed. At the event he also managed to contact the royal family to intercede for the release of his father.

=== Move to Switzerland ===
When Vásáry's father was released, the family left Hungary in 1956, settling in Switzerland. He was a competition finalist again in Rio de Janeiro in 1957. He made his debuts in the major cities of the West from 1960, after a successful concert at the Royal Festival Hall in London. At his first performance with the BBC Proms in 1961, he played Liszt's Piano Concerto No. 1 with the BBC Symphony Orchestra conducted by John Pritchard. The same year, he celebrated the composer's sesquicentennial with a sold-out recital at the Royal Festival Hall. That year saw his debut performance in the United States, where he played Liszt's Piano Concerto No. 1 with the Cleveland Orchestra conducted by George Szell. He made his Carnegie Hall debut the following year, playing J. S. Bach's Goldberg Variations and Beethoven's Hammerklavier Sonata. He played regularly at festivals such as the Holland Festival, the Salzburg Festival, the Edinburgh Music Festival, the Aldeburgh Festival and the Tanglewood Music Festival. At the 1968 BBC Proms, he performed both Chopin's Piano Concerto No. 2 and Liszt's Piano Concerto No. 1 with the BBC Symphony Orchestra conducted by James Loughran. He recorded for Deutsche Grammophon, focused on the Romantic period, such as works by Chopin, Liszt, Schumann, Debussy and Rachmaninoff.

=== Move to London ===
In 1970, Vásáry moved to London and began to work also as a conductor. He returned to Budapest for concerts again from 1972, also teaching master classes at the Academy. He served as artistic director of the Northern Sinfonia from 1979 to 1982, sharing the post with Iván Fischer. With the Northern Sinfonia, he recorded Chopin's Piano Concertos, playing and conducting. Vásáry was principal conductor of the Bournemouth Sinfonietta from 1989 to 1997. They played music from the 20th century, including Stravinsky and James MacMillan. He conducted several Mozart operas, Il Re Pastore at the Aldeburgh Festival, Le nozze di Figaro at both the Sadler's Wells Theatre in London and in Cambridge, and Don Giovanni in Seville.

Vásáry was chief conductor of the Hungarian Radio Symphony Orchestra from 1993 to 2004, becoming then honorary chief musical director for life. He conducted in Budapest operas including Mozart's Die Zauberflöte, Verdi's Rigoletto and Gluck's Orfeo ed Euridice. He founded in his hometown the Zoltán Kodály World Youth Orchestra in 2006, a summer meeting of gifted young musicians. He conducted many leading British and international orchestras and appeared regularly as pianist and conductor in Europe and the United States.

=== Style ===
Harold C. Schonberg wrote "The pleasing thing about his performance, aside from his well-groomed pianism — we all expect complete technicians these days, and generally get them — was its sensitivity. Mr. Vasary gave a big performance without banging or indulging in empty rhetoric." Tim Page called Vásáry's recording of Schumann's Scenes From Childhood "marvelously variegated".

=== Personal life ===
In 1967, Vásáry married Ildikó Kutasi-Kovács, the widow of his best friend. She had grown up in Brazil and been a child actress. She worked at the University College London as a cultural anthropologist. The couple had no children. They regularly attended opera at the Royal Opera House and the Glyndebourne Festival. She died from cancer in 1994 at the age of 47.

Vásáry died in Budapest on 5 February 2026, at the age of 92.

He told The Baltimore Sun: "Everyone is a creator and has wonderful dreams and fantasies. If you can resonate to any great work of art, then you have it in you. But we strive too much for material goods, and we are atrophying our imaginations. I see children who are like dry, old people. If you cannot have emotions, then everything is useless.”

== Recordings ==
Vásáry recorded for labels Supraphon, Deutsche Grammophon, Chandos Records, Academy Sound and Vision, Collins Classic and Hungaroton. He recorded a Liszt recital in Hamburg in 1957, and a reviewer from Gramophone wrote: "There are several places where this unknown, unheralded young pianist clearly possesses three hands ... There is a tingling sensitivity, a real feeling for the control of the iridescent tone-colours and gigantic volume range his fingers can evoke." He recorded both Liszt Concertos in 1959, described as "devoid of bombast", and again in 1960 when Roger Fiske wrote for Gramophone: "Vásáry is one of those pianists who command your attention the whole time. There is no trace of superficiality here, and a great deal of sincerity." He recorded almost the complete music by Chopin for Deutsche Grammophon, both for solo piano and the Piano Concertos. He recorded the concertos again with the Northern Sinfonia of England.

Vásáry recorded Mozart's Piano Concerto Nos. 14, K. 449, and 26, K. 537, conducting the Berliner Philharmoniker from the piano in 1979. In 1991, he recorded works by Liszt released by the Academy of Sound and Vision. His 1998 recording of conducting Dohnányi's Violin Concerto released by Hungaroton won the Midem Prize. In 2006 he recorded both Piano Concertos by Brahms with his friend Peter Frankl as the pianist and the Hungarian Radio Symphony Orchestra.

== Books ==
Books by Vásáry include:

- Vásáry, Tamás (2003). A zenén túl (Beyond the Music) (in Hungarian).
- "Wie in einer anderen Dimension …": Gespräche mit dem Pianisten Tamás Vásáry – aufgezeichnet von Thomas Böttger (in German). Düsseldorf: Staccato. 2005. ISBN 3-932976-26-6.

== Awards ==
Vásáry was honoured with Hungary's highest awards for musicians, including:

- 1951 Liszt Ferenc Prize
- 1998 Kossuth Prize
- 1999 Hungarian Heritage Award
- 2009 Bartók Béla Pásztory Ditta Prize
- 2012 UNESCO's Mozart Medal
- 2014 National Art Prize
- 2017 Order of Saint Stephen of Hungary
- 2020 Dohnányi Ernö Prize
- 2024 Lifetime Achievement Award from Bartók Radio.

He was an honorary member of both the Royal Academy of Music and the Royal College of Music, and was a Chevalier des Arts et des Lettres.

Cultural offices
Preceded by Christopher Seaman	Artistic Director, Northern Sinfonia; 1979–1982 (with Iván Fischer)	Succeeded by Richard Hickox
Preceded by Roger Norrington	Principal Conductor, Bournemouth Sinfonietta; 1989–1997	Succeeded by Alexander Polianichko
