= Tamarkin =

Tamarkin is a Jewish surname, common among families of Russian-Jewish descent, and is believed to be from the Hebrew name Tamar (Hebrew: תמר), and can refer to:

- Jacob Tamarkin (1888–1945), a Russian-American mathematician.
- Jeff Tamarkin (b. 1952), an editor, author and historian specializing in music and popular culture.
- Rosa Tamarkina (1920–1950) pianist
