= Fritz Fryer =

English musician (1944–2007)

- Also known as: Fritz
- Born: David Roderick Carney Fryer; 6 December 1944; Oldham, England, UK
- Died: 2 September 2007 (aged 62) Lisbon, Portugal
- Genre: Pop
- Occupations: Musician, producer
- Instrument: Guitar
- Years active: 1962–2007
- Formerly of: The Four Pennies

David Roderick Carney "Fritz" Fryer (6 December 1944 – 2 September 2007) was a British guitarist. He was the lead guitarist for The Four Pennies from 1962 to 1965.

== Early life ==
Fryer was born in Oldham, the son of a father who was architect and church organist and a mother who ran the Blackburn Salvation Army, and the grandson of pianist Herbert Fryer.

== Career ==
He formed The Four Pennies in 1962 with school friend Mike Wilsh. In 1964, the band got to number one in the UK charts with "Juliet". Fryer left the band in 1965 and formed the trio "Fritz, Mike and Mo" with Mike Deighan and Maureen Edwards. They released two unsuccessful singles for Phillips records. He then returned to The Four Pennies in 1966 however the band ended soon after.

Fryer worked as a producer in the 1970s, and produced records for artists including Motörhead, Dusty Springfield, Marty Wilde, Harry Secombe, Clannad, Horslips, and Stackridge. Fryer bought a barn in Rockfield, Monmouthshire and converted it into a recording studio.

== Personal life and death ==
Lighting shop

Fritz opened a restaurant in Monmouth in the 1970s and then opened a lighting shop in Ross-on-Wye literally called "Fritz Fryer" with his wife Joan in 1982. He sold the shop in 2004 and retired, and as of 2025 the company is still called Fritz Fryer.

Fritz was diagnosed with pancreatic cancer in July 2007 and died on 2 September 2007 in Lisbon, Portugal during surgery to remove a tumour that caused uncontrollable internal bleeding. His funeral was held at St Luke's Church in Santa Barbara, Lisbon five days later.
