= Moll Flanders (disambiguation) =

The Fortunes and Misfortunes of Moll Flanders, commonly abbreviated as Moll Flanders, is a novel written by Daniel Defoe in 1722.

Moll Flanders may also refer to:

== Film ==
- The Amorous Adventures of Moll Flanders (1965), a British film directed by Terence Young
- Moll Flanders (1996 film), starring Robin Wright and Morgan Freeman

== Television ==
- Moll Flanders (TV series), a 1975 British television series directed by Donald McWhinnie
- The Fortunes and Misfortunes of Moll Flanders, a 1996 British series starring Alex Kingston

== See also ==
- Mol, Belgium, a town in the region of Flanders
