= Piano Concertos K. 107 (Mozart) =

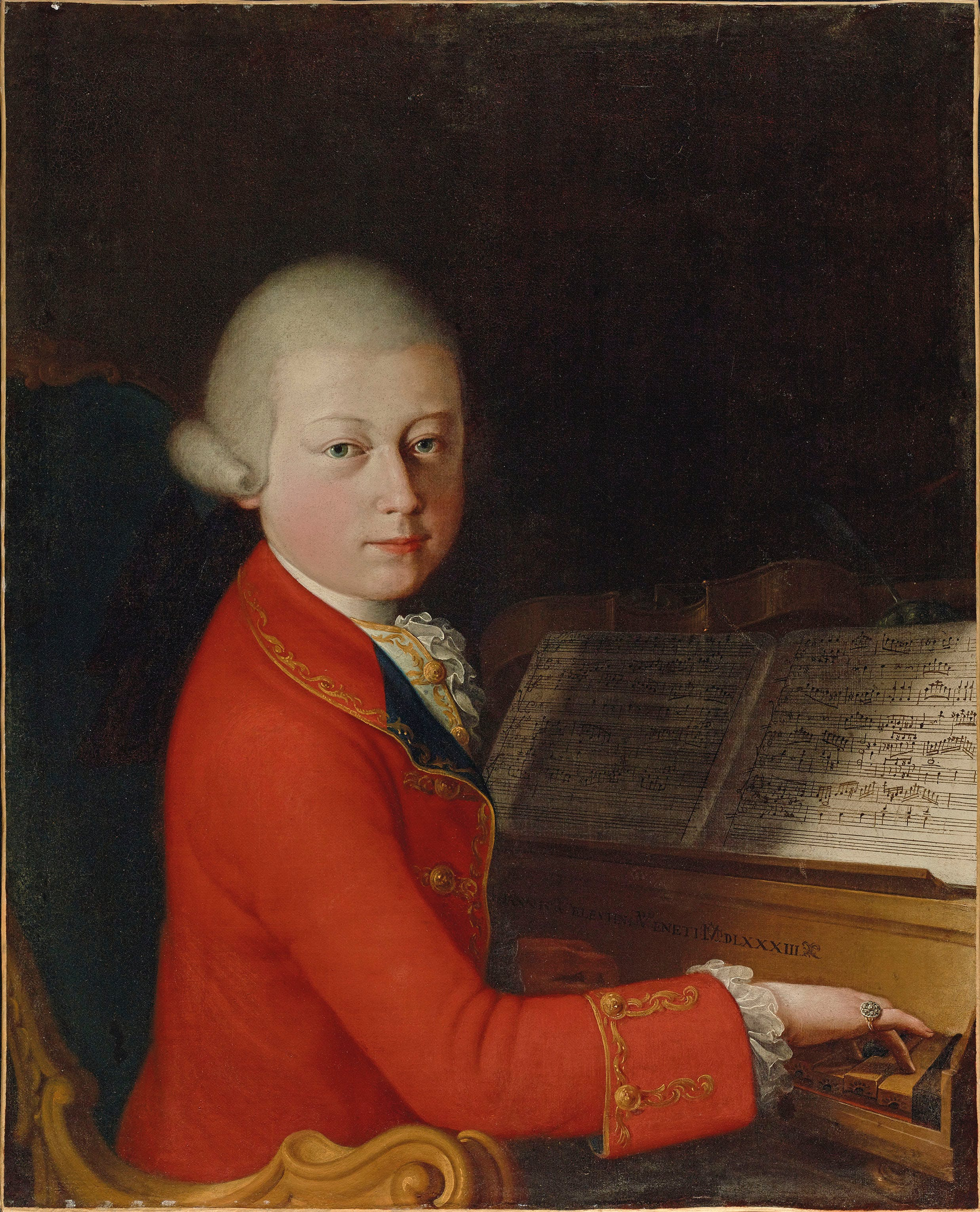
1770 Verona portrait of Mozart

The Piano Concertos, K. 107 are three keyboard concertos by Wolfgang Amadeus Mozart, composed in 1771 (or 1765) and based on sonatas by Johann Christian Bach. These sonatas are from J.C. Bach's Op. 5; Mozart turned Sonata No. 2 in D, Sonata No. 3 in G, and Sonata No. 4 in E♭ from this set into the three concertos of K. 107.

These concertos remained unpublished in the Alte Mozart-Ausgabe, the first complete edition of Mozart's works, so they were not given a number by the publishers of that edition, Breitkopf & Härtel (as the other 27 concerti were given in that publication). Therefore, when these works are enumerated with the rest, it can be seen that Mozart composed 30 keyboard concerti. These three works, however, and the concerti numbered as Piano Concertos 1 through 4 are actually not original compositions, but arrangements of works by other composers.

== Structure ==
=== Concerto K. 107 no. 1 ===
(from J. C. Bach Op. 5 No. 2)

1. Allegro
2. Andante
3. Tempo di Menuetto

=== Concerto K. 107 no. 2 ===
(from J. C. Bach Op. 5 No. 3)

1. Allegro
2. Allegretto (with four variations)

=== Concerto K. 107 no. 3 ===
(from J. C. Bach Op. 5 No. 4)

1. Allegro
2. Rondeau: Allegretto

== Recordings ==
- 1954 - Artur Balsam (piano), Winterthur Symphony Orchestra, Otto Ackermann (Musical Masterpiece Society)
- 1965 - Robert Veyron-Lacroix (piano), Saar Radio Chamber Orchestra, Karl Ristenpart (conductor) (Music Guild Records)
- 1984 - Murray Perahia, English Chamber Orchestra (Sony Classical)
- 1990 - Ton Koopman, Amsterdam Baroque Orchestra (Philips)
- 1992 - Yasuko Mitsui (harpsichord), Orchestre Philharmonique de Craiova, Modest Cichirdan (Gallo)
- 1993 - Malcolm Bilson, Orchestra of the Old Fairfield Academy, Thomas Crawford (MusicMasters)
- 1997 - Boris Mersson (piano), Craiova Philharmonic Orchestra (Doron Music)
- 1998 - Pierre Hantaï, Le Concert Français (Opus 111)
- 2001 - Pieter-Jan Belder, Musica Amphion (Brilliant Classics)
- 1990 - Lars Ulrik Mortensen, London Baroque (Harmonia Mundi)
- 2009 - Viktor Lukas (harpsichord), Lukas-Consort (Concerto Bayreuth)
- 2010 - Maria Graf, Bayerisches Kammerorchester Bad Brückenau, Gernot Schulz (Profil; arranged for harp)
- 2011 - Viviana Sofronitsky, Musica Antiqua Collegium Varsoviense, Tadeusz Karolak (Eťcetera)
- 2011 - Iván Martín, Galdós Ensemble (Warner Classics)
- 2014 - Luca Guglielmi, Concerto Madrigalesco (Accent)
- 2016 - Ronald Brautigam, Die Kölner Akademie, Michael Alexander Willens (BIS)
- 2017 - Erich Traxler, Ensemble Castor (Deutsche Harmonia Mundi)
- 2020 - Cyprien Katsaris, Salzburger Kammerphilharmonie, Yoon Kuk Lee (Piano 21)
