= Rosa Tamarkina =

Soviet pianist (1920–1950)

Rosa Tamarkina Роза Тамаркина
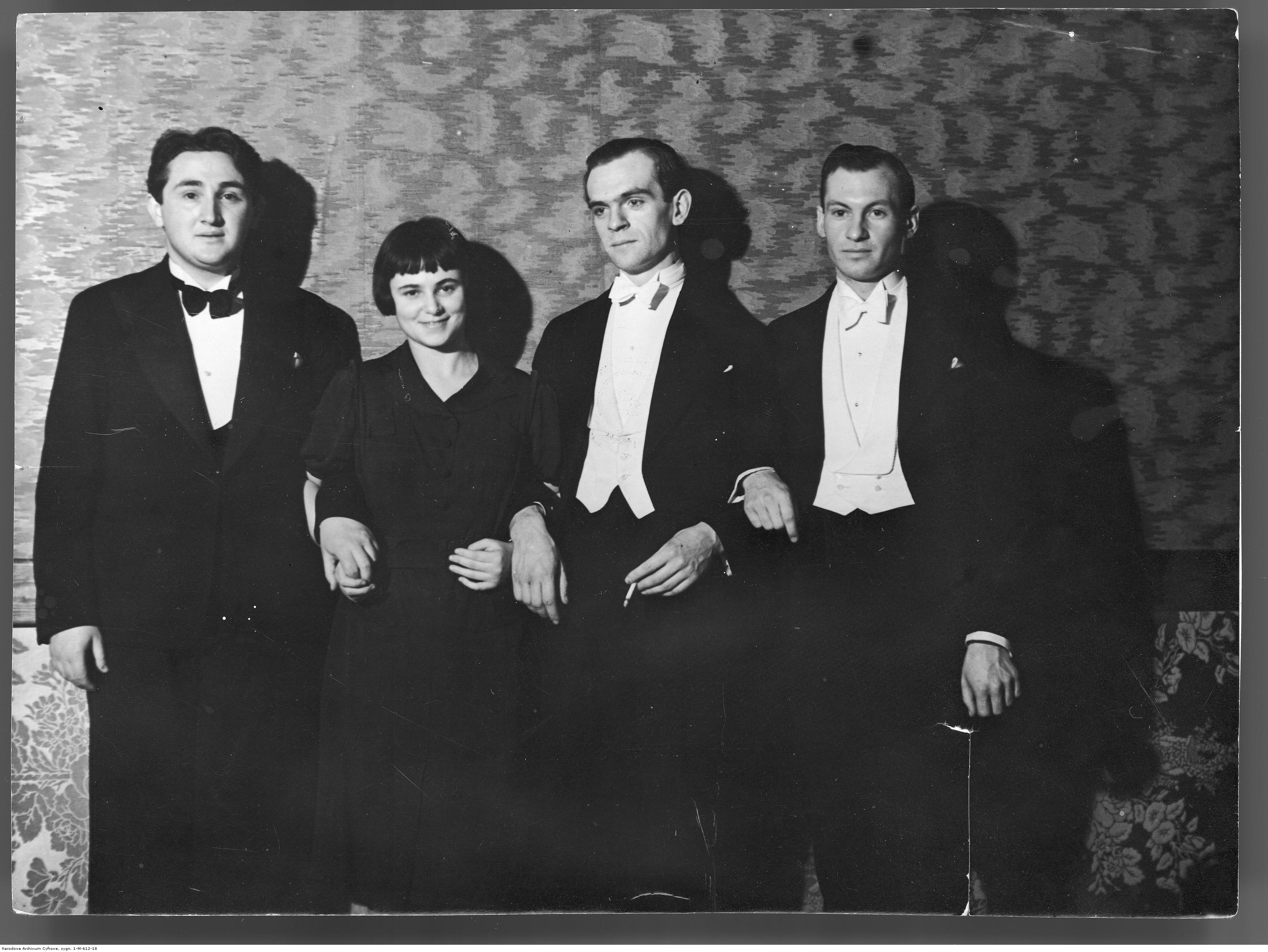
- Rosa Tamarkina with Jakov Zak, Witold Małcużyński and Lance Dossor. Warsaw, February 1937

Background information
- Born: Rosa Vladimirovna Tamarkina; 23 March 1920; Kiev, Ukrainian SSR
- Died: 5 August 1950 (aged 30) Moscow, Russian SFSR, Soviet Union
- Genre: Classical music
- Occupation: Virtuoso pianist
- Instrument: Piano
- Years active: 1933–1950

Rosa Vladimirovna Tamarkina (Russian: Ро́за Влади́мировна Тама́ркина; 23 March 1920 – 5 August 1950) was a Soviet pianist who won second prize in the III International Chopin Piano Competition in Warsaw (1937).

== Early life and education ==
Tamarkina, born to a Jewish family in Kiev, began learning piano as a very young child. Her mother had a musical ear, but did not play. Rosa was the youngest child in the family and from an early age showed impressive abilities for music. At the age of 5, she was enrolled for the children’s section of the Kiev Conservatory where, for five years (1928–1932), her teacher was Nadezhda Markovna Goldenberg.

Between 1932 and 1935 she was a student in the special children’s section at the Moscow Conservatory. She completed the higher course at the Conservatoire in 1940, as a graduate of Aleksandr Goldenweiser’s piano class. She continued her studies with Goldenweiser and later (1943–1945) with Konstantin Igumnov.

== Career ==
Tamarkina started appearing in public at the age of 13, astounding listeners and critics with the maturity of her interpretation, temperament and virtuosity. From 1933, she developed her concert career within Russia. Her first recordings were released in 1935: Liszt's Rigoletto Paraphrase and Hungarian Rhapsody No. 10. Its successful beginning was noted in Pravda: “…an absolutely unforgettable impression is left by the play of fourteen-year-old pianist Rosa Tamarkina, student of Professor Goldenweiser. Rhapsody No. 10 in her interpretation is a musical event…” Regardless of whether she would play Bach, Mozart, Beethoven, Tchaikovsky, Scriabin, Rachmaninoff or especially Chopin, her grasp of the work was apt, full of noble simplicity, charm and natural poetry.

In December 1936, Tamarkina became the winner of the Second Soviet Union Competition of Musicians. She was selected as the youngest member of the Soviet team to compete in the III International Chopin Piano Competition, held in Warsaw in 21 February – 12 March 1937. Tamarkina took part in the Chopin Competition at the age of 16. Already after Stage 1 it was clear that she was in the running for a prize. Eventually the jury, composed of renowned pianists such as Emil von Sauer, Wilhelm Backhaus, Heinrich Neuhaus, Józef Turczyński, Józef Śmidowicz and Jerzy Żurawlew, awarded her second prize.

External images
- Roza Tamarkina. 1933–1934
- Playing Rosa Tamarkina. Warsaw, March 1937
- Standing from left to right: Witold Małcużyński, Poland (Prize III), Jakov Zak, USSR (Prize I), Chairman of the jury Adam Venjavski, Lance Dossor, United Kingdom (Prize IV). At the piano – Roza Tamarkina, USSR (Prize II). Warsaw, March 1937
- Roza Tamarkina. 1938
- Roza Tamarkina. 1946

Professor Piotr Rytel wrote: "Younger [...] than Zak, Ms. Rosa Tamarkina [...] when it comes to her inner relationship to music might even surpass Zak. […] Sixteen years and already such an excellent technique, complexity and ease." Neuhaus wrote: "Rosa Tamarkina made a real sensation on the competition – not merely because of her age. Despite her young age, she is beyond doubt a perfectly matured, perfectly conscious pianist. Backhaus shouted to me: 'This is marvelous'".

In 1946, Tamarkina started teaching at the Moscow Conservatory, which greatly limited the number of her concert appearances. In celebration of the centenary of Chopin's death in October 1949, a concert was held at the Great Hall of the Moscow Conservatory where Tamarkina performed Chopin's Concerto in F minor.

This was to be her last stage appearance before her death from cancer at age 30 in Moscow in 1950.

== Personal life ==
From 1940 to 1944, Rosa Tamarkina was married to pianist Emil Gilels.

== Legacy ==
Tamarkina is today remembered for her interpretations of Chopin’s works (Fantasie in F minor, Scherzos in B flat minor and C sharp minor, Polonaise in F sharp minor, Sonata in B minor, Nocturne in G major and Concerto in F minor), Franz Liszt (Sonata in B minor, Mephisto Waltz, Hungarian Rhapsody No. 10, Rigoletto Concert Paraphrase), Schumann (Fantasie in C major) and Rachmaninoff (Piano Concerto No. 2 in C minor). Her numerous recordings include Chopin’s Fantasie in F minor and Scherzo in C sharp minor.
