= Lionel Morton =

English musician and TV presenter

- Born: Lionel Walmsley; 14 August 1942 (age 84); Blackburn, Lancashire, England
- Occupations: Musician and television presenter
- Instruments: Vocal, rhythm guitar
- Formerly of: The Four Pennies

Lionel Morton (born Lionel Walmsley, 14 August 1942) is an English former musician and television presenter. He was the lead singer for The Four Pennies, who had a number one hit with "Juliet" in 1964, and was a presenter on Play School from 1968 to 1977.

== Biography ==
Lionel Morton was born Lionel Walmsley in Blackburn, Lancashire, England. He sang in the local cathedral choir.

In the early 1960s, he was the lead vocalist/rhythm guitarist of the group, The Four Pennies. They are best known for their biggest hit single, "Juliet" which reached number one in the UK Singles Chart in May 1964. Morton and his group appeared seven times on the BBC Television music charts programme, Top of the Pops.

From April 1968 to December 1977, he was a regular presenter on the pre-school children's programme Play School. His debut appearance on the show was wiped however his third appearance, dated 11th June 1968, is the earliest archived. In the 1970s he went on to present on Play Away. Many recent reports have come out revealing that Morton, as well as a few other presenters including Johnny Ball and Rick Jones, smoked marijuana and was high when he recorded some episodes of Play School in the 1970s, including an episode in which the shows hosts filmed a nativity scene.

He was formerly married to actress, Julia Foster, for five years, with whom he had a daughter Emily. He now lives in Cornwall.

== Discography ==
=== Singles ===
Year	Label	A-side	B-side
1967	Phillips	"What To Do With Laurie	"I'll Just Wait Around"
1967	Phillips	"First Love Never Dies"	"Try Not To Cry"
1969	RCA Victor	"Waterloo Road"	"Floral Street"
1972	Cube Records	"What A Woman Does"	"Listen To The Music"
1974	BBC Records	"Don't Let Life Get You Down"	"Play Away"

=== Albums ===
Year	Label	Title
1972	BBC Records	Play School
1973	Contour Records	Lionel
1973	BBC Records	Bang on a Drum
1973	BBC Records	Play Away
1975	BBC Records	Hey You! Songs from Play Away
1975	BBC Records	Sing a Song of Play School

== Filmography ==
Year	Title	Role	Notes
1964	Top of the Pops	Himself	Performing with The Four Pennies / six episodes
1964	Ready Steady Go!	Himself	Performing with The Four Pennies / four episodes
1965	Pop Gear	Himself	Performing with The Four Pennies / film
1965	Blackpool Night Out	Himself	Performing with The Four Pennies / one episode
1968—1985	Play School	Himself	Presenter / three hundred and fifty episodes
1971—1977	Play Away	Himself	Presenter / twenty nine episodes
1976	Star Turn	Himself	Two episodes
