= Zinaida Ignatyeva =

Russian pianist (1938–2022)

Zinaida Ignatyeva (Russian: Зинаи́да Игна́тьева; also spelled Zinaida Ignatieva; 1 February 1938 – 23 March 2022) was a Russian pianist.

Born in Moscow, Ignatyeva was a student at the Moscow Conservatory under Samuil Feinberg, where she was awarded the VI International Chopin Piano Competition's 5th prize. Ignatyeva is a professor at the Moscow Conservatory, where she was appointed a teacher after graduating in 1962. She was active as a concert pianist within the USSR.

Zinaida Ignatyeva died on March 23, 2022 at the age of 84.

== Awards and honours ==
- People's Artist of Russia
- Laureate of the Frederic Chopin International Competition in Poland
