= The Four Pennies =

English rock band

- Origin: Blackburn, Lancashire, England
- Genres: Beat, Rock and roll
- Years active: 1962–1966
- Label: Philips
- Past members: Lionel Morton; Mike Wilsh; Fritz Fryer; Alan Buck; David Graham

The Four Pennies were an English beat group most notable for their 1964 UK chart-topping song "Juliet". The band achieved four more top 40 hits in the UK, but failed to chart in the United States during the British Invasion.

== Career ==
The Four Pennies were founded in 1963, and initially consisted of Lionel Morton (vocals, rhythm guitar), Fritz Fryer (lead guitar), Mike Wilshaw (bass, keyboards, backing vocals), and Alan Buck (drums) The group's name was chosen as a more commercial alternative to "The Lionel Morton Four", and was decided upon after a meeting above a Blackburn music shop, Reidy's Home of Music, which was then situated on "Penny Street".

In their homeland, the group scored a number 47 placing with their first single, 1964's "Do You Want Me To". They then became famous for having a number one hit in the UK Singles Chart later in 1964 with "Juliet". It was written by group members Fritz Fryer, Mike Wilshaw and Lionel Morton. The ballad was originally intended for release as a b-side (b/w "Tell Me Girl"). "Juliet" was the only 1964 Number one by a UK group not to chart in America. The US division of Philips Records issued only two of the Four Pennies' singles stateside. Both these singles ("Juliet" and "Until It's Time for You to Go") were major European hits, but while "Juliet" did pick up some airplay on a number of US radio stations, "Until It's Time For You To Go" did not. In any event, neither single picked up enough US airplay or sales to chart.

Following the UK chart-topping success of "Juliet", the Four Pennies racked up subsequent 1964 UK hits with their original "I Found Out The Hard Way" and a cover version of Lead Belly's, "Black Girl". They also issued an album, Two Sides of Four Pennies, which, as was customary for British acts of the time, mostly ignored their hit singles.

After their first single of 1965 did not reach the UK chart, Fryer left the Four Pennies to found a folk trio called Fritz, Mike and Mo. (The single's b-side, "A Place Where No-One Goes", found success in Turkey later that year). Fryer was replaced on guitar by David Graham. The revamped quartet then hit the UK chart again with "Until It's Time for You to Go", written by Buffy Sainte-Marie. 1966 saw the final UK chart entry for the Four Pennies, with a cover version of Bobby Vinton's "Trouble Is My Middle Name". Fryer then returned to the fold, replacing Graham.

They finished 1966 – and their career – with a non-charting album (Mixed Bag), and two non-charting singles: UK songwriter Charles Bell's "Keep The Freeway Open", and Tom Springfield's "No More Sad Songs For Me". By the end of the year, the group had dissolved.

== Other activities ==
- Having left the group in 1965, Fritz Fryer formed the folk-rock trio, Fritz, Mike and Mo, in collaboration with songwriter Mike Deighan and Maureen Edwards (born c. 1931). Deighan had co-written material for the Four Pennies, including three tracks on their first album, Two Sides of Four Pennies. Fritz, Mike and Mo recorded two unsuccessful singles for Philips, "Somebody Stole the Sun" c/w "Let Me Hear Your Voice" and "What Colour Is A Man" (a cover version of a US release by Bobby Vinton, who also provided the Pennies' "Trouble Is My Middle Name") c/w "So Now You're Gone". After the failure of Fritz, Mike and Mo, Fryer returned to the Four Pennies in 1966. After the group's dissolution, Fryer worked as record producer for Motörhead among others.
- Lionel Morton recorded two solo singles for Philips in the wake of the Pennies' dissolution. He also recorded a version of "Waterloo Road," a song written by ex-Penny Mike Wilshaw and Mike Deighan, for RCA Victor. "Waterloo Road" was originally recorded by the pop-psychedelic band Jason Crest, who were discovered by members of the Four Pennies. Morton, who was at one time married to the actress, Julia Foster, went on to become a children's TV presenter in the 1960s and 70s.
- Alan Buck had drummed for both Joe Brown's Bruvvers, and Johnny Kidd's Pirates, prior to joining The Four Pennies.
- The Four Pennies appeared in two films. British Big Beat (1965) had the group miming to their no. 1 hit, "Juliet", whilst Pop Gear (also 1965) contained performances of both "Juliet" and "Black Girl".

== Band members ==
Original and final line-up:

- Lionel Morton – vocalist / rhythm guitarist – born Lionel Walmsley, 14 August 1942, Blackburn, Lancashire, England
- Fritz Fryer – lead guitarist – born David Roderick Carney Fryer, 6 December 1944, Oldham, Lancashire – died 2 September 2007, Lisbon, Portugal, from pancreatic cancer. He was a grandson of the noted pianist and teacher Herbert Fryer.
- Alan Buck – drummer – born 7 April 1943, Brierfield, Burnley, Lancashire – died 15 March 1994, Ealing, West London from a heart attack.
- Mike Wilshaw – bassist / keyboardist / backing vocalist – born Michael Wilshaw, 21 July 1945, Stoke-on-Trent, Staffordshire

Also:

- David Graham, lead guitarist, from Reading, Berkshire – Replaced Fryer from April 1965 to early 1966, when Fryer left to found Fritz, Mike and Mo. Graham played on their final two UK chart hits, and left when Fryer returned to the line-up.
- Ray Monk also deputised on rare occasions, before managing the Preston Sony Music Centre in 1987–94.

== Discography ==
=== Albums ===
Title	Album details	Peak chart positions
Title	Album details	UK
2 Sides of 4 Pennies	Released: October 1964; Label: Philips	13
Mixed Bag	Released: October 1966; Label: Philips	—
"—" denotes releases that did not chart.

=== EPs ===
Title	Album details	Peak chart positions
Title	Album details	UK
The Four Pennies	Released: August 1964; Label: Philips	—
Spin with the Pennies	Released: August 1964; Label: Philips	6
The Swinging Side of the Four Pennies	Released: May 1965; Label: Philips	—
The Smooth Side of the Four Pennies	Released: May 1965; Label: Philips	—
"—" denotes releases that did not chart.

=== Singles ===
Title	Year	Peak chart positions						
Title	Year	UK	AUS	IRE	NOR	NZ	SWE	US
"Do You Want Me To" b/w "Miss Bad Daddy"	1963	47	—	—	—	—	—	—
"Juliet" (Note: "Juliet" was originally released as the B-side.) b/w "Tell Me Girl (What Are You Gonna Do)"	1964	1	53	3	9	1	8	116
"I Found Out the Hard Way" b/w "Don't Tell Me You Love Me"	1964	14	—	—	—	—	—	—
"Black Girl" b/w "You Went Away"	1964	20	—	—	—	—	—	—
"The Way of Love" b/w "A Place Where No-One Goes"	1965	—	—	—	—	—	—	—
"Someone Stole the Sun" (both sides by Fritz, Mike and Mo)b/w "Let Me Hear Your Voice"	1965	—	—	—	—	—	—	—
"Until It's Time for You to Go" b/w "Till Another Day"	1965	19	—	—	—	—	—	—
"What Colour (Is a Man)" (both sides by Fritz, Mike and Mo)b/w "So Now Your Gone"	1965	—	—	—	—	—	—	—
"Trouble Is My Middle Name" b/w "Way Out Love"	1966	32	—	—	—	—	—	—
"Keep the Freeway Open" b/w "Square Peg"	1966	54 (Note: Chart position is from the official UK "Breakers List".)	—	—	—	—	—	—
"No Sad Songs for Me" b/w "Cats"	1966	—	—	—	—	—	—	—
"Iko Iko" (as the Pennies)b/w "Ode to an Occasional Table"	1976	—	—	—	—	—	—	—
"—" denotes releases that did not chart or were not released in that territory.

== See also ==
- List of artists who reached number one on the UK Singles Chart
- List of performers on Top of the Pops
