= Julia Foster =

English actress (born 1943)

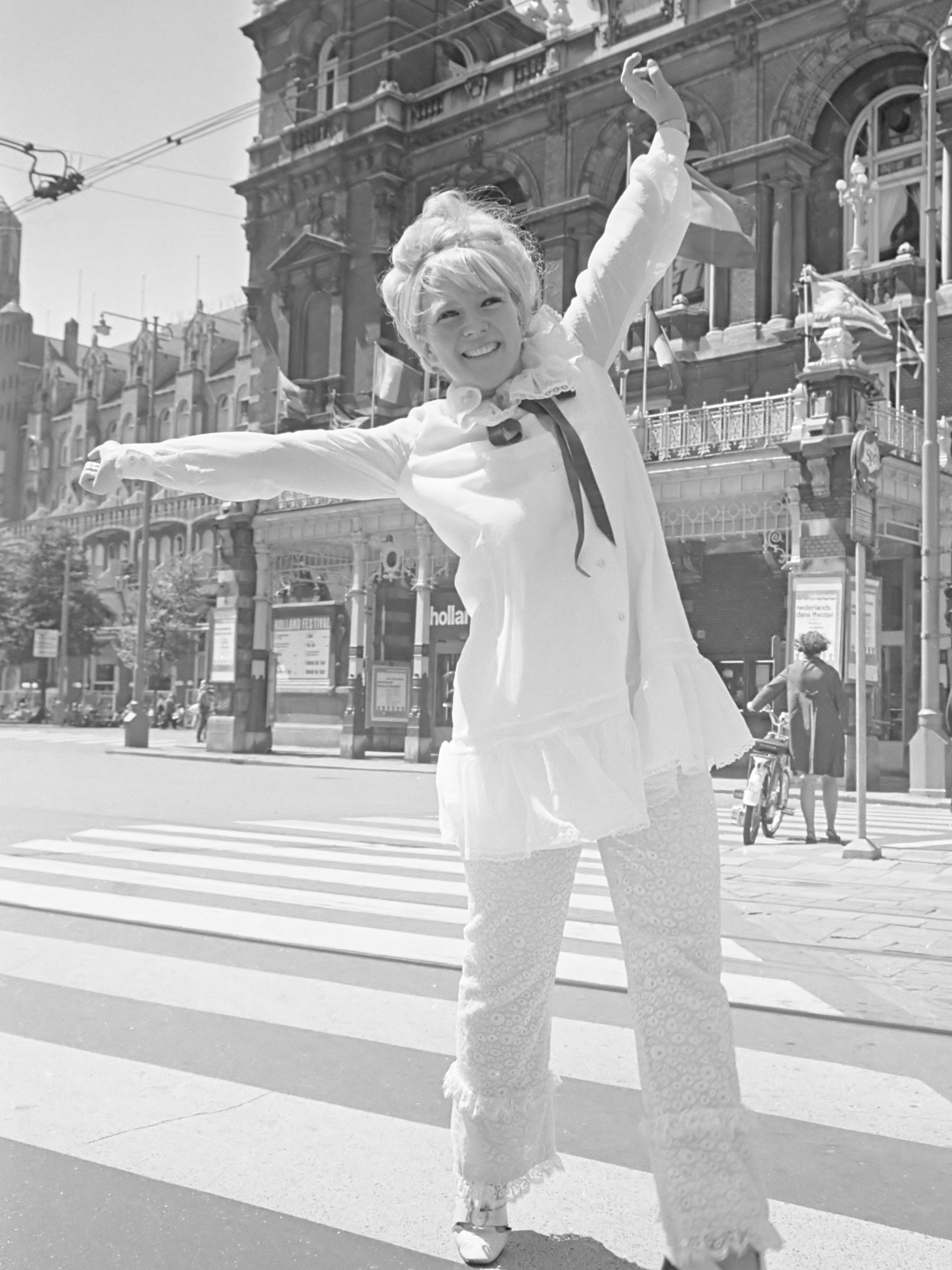
- Foster at Leidseplein, Amsterdam, in 1968
- Born: Julia Foster; 2 August 1943 (age 83); Lewes, Sussex, England
- Occupation: Actress
- Spouse(s): Lionel Morton (divorced); Bruce Fogle
- Children: 3 (including Ben Fogle)

Julia Foster (born 2 August 1943) is an English stage, screen, and television actress.

== Early life ==
Foster was born in Lewes, Sussex. She was educated at a convent.

== Career ==
Foster's credits include the films The Loneliness of the Long Distance Runner (1962), The System (1964) with Oliver Reed, The Bargee (1964) with Harry H. Corbett, Alfie (1966) with Michael Caine, Half a Sixpence (1967) with Tommy Steele, and Percy (1971) with Hywel Bennett.

On television, in 1969, she appeared in the second episode of series 1 of the Doctor in the House for London Weekend Television. Foster also starred as the eponymous heroine in the BBC production of Moll Flanders (1975) and appeared alongside John Stride in the Yorkshire Television series Wilde Alliance in 1978. Foster latterly appeared with Michael Winner in a British TV advert for Esure car insurance.

She played Queen Margaret of Anjou in the BBC Television Shakespeare adaptations of Henry VI, Part 1, Henry VI, Part 2, and The Tragedy of Richard III, which received its UK broadcast in January 1983.

After her stage debut with the Brighton Repertory Theatre, Foster made her London debut in Travelling Light in 1965 at the Prince of Wales Theatre; she has since appeared in several London stage productions, including at The Globe Theatre, Lyric Theatre (Hammersmith), Queens Theatre, Criterion Theatre, King's Head Theatre, Royal Court Theatre, Apollo Theatre, New End Theatre, also in the UK at the Nottingham Playhouse, New Theatre, Oxford, Birmingham Repertory Company, and the Citizens Theatre, Glasgow.

In 1967, Foster appeared on Juke Box Jury, in 1971 on Call My Bluff, and in 1976, she was the castaway on Desert Island Discs.

Foster returned to acting in Alan Bennett's Allelujah! at the Bridge Theatre in 2018, playing retired librarian Mary. "For a long while I'd taken a break from acting," Foster commented. "I wasn't being asked to do the things I wanted to do, so the family became more important than one's career. I can't honestly remember how long it is since I last appeared on stage."

In 2020, she played Vilma in Orphan 55, the third episode of series 12 of Doctor Who.

Away from acting, Foster built up her own antique furniture business.

== Personal life ==
Foster's first husband was Lionel Morton, once the lead singer with the 1960s pop band The Four Pennies. They had a daughter, Emily, who is a graphic designer.

Foster is the mother of television celebrity Ben Fogle with her second husband, veterinarian Bruce Fogle. They also have a daughter, Tamara, who is a clothes designer. The couple, who met in 1970, were married in 1973. They live near Arundel in West Sussex.

== Selected filmography ==
- Term of Trial (1962)
- The Loneliness of the Long Distance Runner (1962)
- The Small World of Sammy Lee (1963)
- Two Left Feet (1963)
- The Bargee (1964)
- The System (1964)
- One Way Pendulum (1964)
- Alfie (1966)
- Ride of the Valkyrie (1967)
- Half a Sixpence (1968)
- Simon, Simon (1970)
- Percy (1971)
- The Great McGonagall (1974)
- All Coppers Are... (1972)
- Flick (2008)
- Dad's Army (2016) – Dolly Godfrey

== Selected television credits ==
- Emergency Ward 10 (1961)
- Your World (1961)
- Taxi! (1963)
- They Throw It at You, Armchair Theatre, (1964)
- The Villains (1964)
- The Public Eye (1965)
- The Seven Deadly Sins (1966)
- The Sex Game (1968)
- Doctor in the House (1969)
- Good Girl (1974)
- Mr Axelford’s Angel, ITV Playhouse (1974).
- Masquerade (1974)
- Moll Flanders (1975)
- F. Scott Fitzgerald in Hollywood (1975)
- A Divorce (1976)
- Wilde Alliance (1978)
- Jukes of Piccadilly (1980)
- Hammer House of Horror (1980)
- Tragedy of Richard III, The (1983)
- King Henry VI (1983)
- The Cabbage Patch (1983)
- Late Starter (1985)
- News at Twelve (1988)
- Casualty (1992)
- Holby City (2001/2019)

== Selected stage appearances ==
- What the Butler Saw, Queens Theatre, London (1969)
- Flint, Criterion Theatre, London (1970)
- Lulu, Nottingham Playhouse and Royal Court Theatre, London (1970)
- The Day after the Fair, Lyric Theatre, Hammersmith, London (1972)
- Notes on a Love Affair, Globe Theatre, London (1972)
- St Joan, New Theatre Oxford (1974)
- The Singular Life of Albert Nobbs, New End Theatre, London (1978)
- Happy Birthday, Apollo Theatre, London (1979)
- Country Wife, Citizens Theatre, Glasgow, 1979, then Lyric Theatre, Hammersmith, London (1980)
- After You With the Milk, with the Birmingham Repertory Company (1980)
- Time and the Conways, Chichester Festival Theatre (1983)
- The Women, Old Vic, London and Yvonne Arnaud Theatre, Guildford, Surrey (1986, 1987)
- Preserving Mr. Panmure, Chichester Festival Theatre (1991)
- The Rise and Fall of Little Voice, Bristol Old Vic (1993 – 1994)
- Allelujah!, Bridge Theatre (2018)
