= Michel Block =

Belgian-French pianist (1937–2003)

Michel Block (January 12, 1937 – March 4, 2003) was a Belgian-French pianist.

== Biography ==
Born of French parents in Antwerp, Belgium, he moved with his parents to Mexico as child, where his grandfather had settled in 1870. Block studied piano in that country and later at the Juilliard School in New York City.

In one of the most famous of all competition incidents, Block won the Arthur Rubinstein Prize in Warsaw at the VI International Chopin Piano Competition in 1960. As a contestant in that year's competition, he was only placed eleventh. Outraged with this result, Arthur Rubinstein created a special prize bearing his name on the spot, which carried with it the money corresponding to the second prize, and awarded it to Block. Two years later, Michel Block won the Leventritt Competition in New York, adding his name to the illustrious list of winners, among which Alexis Weissenberg, Van Cliburn, and Eugene Istomin.

Block appeared with the great orchestras and conductors in the United States and in Europe. Among them were the Berlin Philharmonic, New York Philharmonic, Chicago Symphony Orchestra, London Philharmonic Orchestra, and Concertgebouw Orchestra in Amsterdam; and among the conductors, Georg Solti, Carlo Maria Giulini, Riccardo Muti, and Bernard Haitink.

In 1978, Block joined the music faculty at Indiana University Bloomington, and greatly reduced his concertizing. In later years, he rarely performed in public. In 1996, he performed in New York for the first time in nearly 15 years at the Pro Piano Recital Series.

His playing was characterized by a rich singing tone, lyrical phrasing, transparent voicing, and wonderful dynamic control. In 1997, Block retired from teaching and lived a quiet, uneventful, and happy life.

Block made numerous recordings (many of which are now out of print) for major labels, including EMI, Pathé Marconi, Pro-Piano, Opus Magnum International, and Deutsche Grammophon. He recorded music by Sergei Rachmaninoff, Robert Schumann, Frédéric Chopin, J. S. Bach, Franz Schubert, Enrique Granados, Alexander Scriabin, and Isaac Albéniz (including his disc of the suite Iberia).
