= Monique de La Bruchollerie =

French pianist

Monique de La Bruchollerie (20 April 1915 – 15 December 1972) was a French classical concert pianist.

== Career ==
La Bruchollerie was born in Paris. She came from a family of musicians, both François-Adrien Boieldieu and André Messager being among her ancestors. At the age of 7 she entered the class of Isidor Philipp (a friend of her parents) at the Paris Conservatoire, which she left in 1928 with a first prize. A concert she gave in 1932 under the baton of Charles Münch brought her breakthrough as a pianist. Between 1936 and 1938 she went on to take part in more piano competitions, above all in the III International Chopin Piano Competition of 1937 in Warsaw and the 1939 Brussels Competition.

After the Second World War she developed an international career, above all in the USA and in Poland, and she worked with conductors such as Sergiu Celibidache, Eugen Jochum, Herbert von Karajan, Ernest Ansermet and Jan Krenz. In 1952, La Bruchollerie performed for the Peabody Mason Concerts in Boston. Her concert career ended quite suddenly in December 1966 through a car accident in Romania, as a result of which she suffered a fracture of the skull, lateral paralysis and an irreversible injury to her right hand. Thenceforth she devoted herself to teaching. Among her pupils were Jean-Marc Savelli, and Cyprien Katsaris.

She made numerous recordings, notably for His Master's Voice and for American Vox Records labels. She died in 1972, aged 57.

== External links and sources ==
- Review of Concert by Monique de La Bruchollerie, given 3 May 1952 in Schillersaal, Tübingen, Germany, in O. Weinreich and G. Wille (Eds), Zur Musikwissenschaft 1909-1960: Konzertkritiken 1923-1933 und 1945-1952 (John Benjamins Publishing Company, 1975), ISBN 90-6032-060-3, ISBN 978-90-6032-060-0, p. 571.
- Naxos Biography of Monique de La Bruchollerie
- Fryderyk Chopin Institute Biography of Monique de La Bruchollerie
- Astro databank birth astrological horoscope of Monique de La Bruchollerie
- Specialist website describing live recordings surviving by Monique de La Bruchollerie
- Doremi website listing available recordings of Monique de La Bruchollerie, with photographs
- Classics Online biography of Monique de La Bruchollerie
