= Herbert Fryer =

English pianist, teacher and composer (1877–1957)

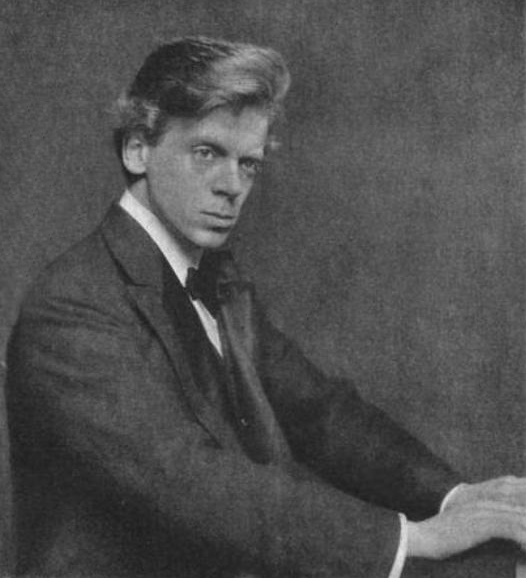
- In The Sketch, 22 April 1903
- Born: George Herbert Fryer; 21 May 1877; Hampstead, London, England
- Died: 7 February 1957 (aged 79); London, England
- Education: Royal Academy of Music; Royal College of Music
- Occupations: Pianist; teacher; composer
- Years active: 1898–1947

George Herbert Fryer (21 May 1877 – 7 February 1957) was an English pianist, teacher and composer.

== Early life ==
Fryer was born in Hampstead, London in 1877, the only son of three children. His father George Henry Fryer was an insurance broker. He was educated at Merchant Taylors' School, then went on for two years study (1893–95) under Oscar Beringer at the Royal Academy of Music (RAM).

In 1894, Fryer won the Heathcote Long Prize. This was followed by four years of study (1895–1898) at the Royal College of Music (RCM), under Franklin Taylor. In 1898, Fryer had some lessons with Ferruccio Busoni in Weimar. He also studied with Tobias Matthay.

== Career ==
He made his London debut on 17 November 1898, and then commenced a career as a touring recitalist as well as an examiner for the Associated Board of the Royal Schools of Music. These tours took him all over Britain and Europe, and also to many parts of Canada, the United States, Australia (including the goldfields of Western Australia), South Africa, the Far East, and India. He was also a competition adjudicator. He was said to have travelled more than any other British pianist. He gave 50 recitals in London alone, said to have been a record. The King of Norway attended his recital in Christiania.

He played at the Proms on six occasions between 1901 and 1918, performing such works as Mozart's Piano Concerto No. 24, Beethoven's Piano Concerto No. 3, Tchaikovsky's Piano Concerto No. 1 and Concert Fantasia, and Brahms' Piano Concerto No. 2. His knowledge of the Brahms concerto was informed by the fact that his teacher Oscar Beringer had given the British premiere of the work in 1882. From 1922 Fryer was also a frequent broadcaster during the earliest days of radio.

In 1905, he took up a teaching position at the RAM, where he continued until 1914. His first tour of North America came in 1914, and he stayed there for three years, teaching at the Institute of Musical Art in New York (later merged with the Juilliard School). On his return to Britain in 1917, he was appointed Professor of Piano at the Royal College of Music, remaining in that post for the next 30 years, until 1947. Fryer's list of pupils was impressive. They included Arthur Bliss, Lance Dossor, Colin Horsley, Constant Lambert, Harold Rutland, Cyril Smith and Kendall Taylor.

== Later life and death ==
On retirement, he continued teaching privately above Blüthner's showrooms, and died in London in 1957, aged 79.

Fritz Fryer (1944–2007), lead guitarist of the British pop group The Four Pennies, was his grandson.

== Students ==
Fryer's students:

- Trevor Barnard (born 1938), British-born Australian pianist and teacher
- John Bishop (1903–1964), best known as founder of the Adelaide Festival
- Arthur Bliss (1891–1975), composer
- Richard Bonynge (born 1930), conductor and husband of Dame Joan Sutherland
- David Buchan (1903–2000), blind British pianist, author of Memoirs of a Pianist
- Alex Burnard (1900–1971), Australian composer
- Philip Challis (1929–1996), British pianist
- John Clegg (1928–2014), pianist
- Lance Dossor (1916–2005), British-born pianist and teacher who emigrated to Australia in May 1953
- Philip Gammon, (b. 1940), pianist
- Colin Horsley (1920–2012), New Zealand-born pianist and teacher resident in the UK
- Leonard Isaacs (1909–1997), UK pianist and teacher who moved to Canada in 1963
- Mack Jost (1918–2000), Australian pianist from Melbourne
- John Kuchmy (1912–1988), Canadian pianist who worked in the UK
- Constant Lambert (1905–1951), composer
- George Malcolm (1917–1997), pianist, organist, harpsichordist, and conductor
- Anthony Milner (1925–2002), composer
- David Parkhouse (1930–1989), pianist
- Leo Quayle (1918–2005), South African pianist and conductor
- Phyllis Schuldt (1911–1982), UK-born pianist who worked in Canada
- Cyril Smith (1909–1974), pianist and teacher
- Richard Smith (1928–2009), English pianist, teacher and concert director for Southport Arts Center
- Kendall Taylor (1905–1999), pianist and teacher
- Glyn Townley (1911–2012), South African pianist

== Recordings ==
Herbert Fryer made some recordings, both Welte-Mignon piano rolls and 78 rpm acoustic recordings for Vocalion. These include:

- Beethoven: Minuet in E-flat
- Chopin: Trois nouvelles études; Prelude from Op. 28
- Dvořák: Humoresque in G-flat
- MacDowell: Sea Pieces, Op. 55, recorded 1909
- Schumann: The Prophet Bird, from Op. 82

== Compositions ==
His compositions are now little known. They include:

- Intermezzo, Op. 1 (1903)
- Étude-Caprice, Op. 9, No. 1
- Suite in Old Form, Op. 11, for piano (1910)
- Deux Morceaux de danse, Op. 12 (No. 1: Valse en ré; No. 2: Petite danse) (1912)
- Trois Préludes pour piano seul, Op. 16 (1914)
- Three Preludes, Op. 17
- Country Side. Suite for pianoforte, Op. 18 (1918)
- Transcriptions for Pianoforte of Old English Melodies from H. Lane Wilson's Collection, Op. 19 (1919)
- The Virgin's Cradle-Hymn, Op. 20, No. 1
- Five Transcriptions from Bach, Op. 22 (all from his Suites for solo cello):
  - Bourrée & Gigue from Suite No. 3 in C major, BWV 1009
  - Sarabande from Suite for Suite No. 4 in E flat major, BWV 1010
  - Sarabande & Gavotte from Suite No. 6 in D major, BWV 1012 (Jonathan Plowright has recorded the Sarabande; his live performance of it at the Wigmore Hall on 15 November 2008 can be heard here on YouTube)
- Six Little Variations on a Rigadoon by H. Purcell, Op. 21 (1922)
- piano arrangements of traditional Irish and English tunes
  - Ah, Willow!
  - My Love's an Arbutus (Video on YouTube)

He wrote Hints on Pianoforte Practice (New York: G. Schirmer, 1916).
