= Reidy's Home of Music =

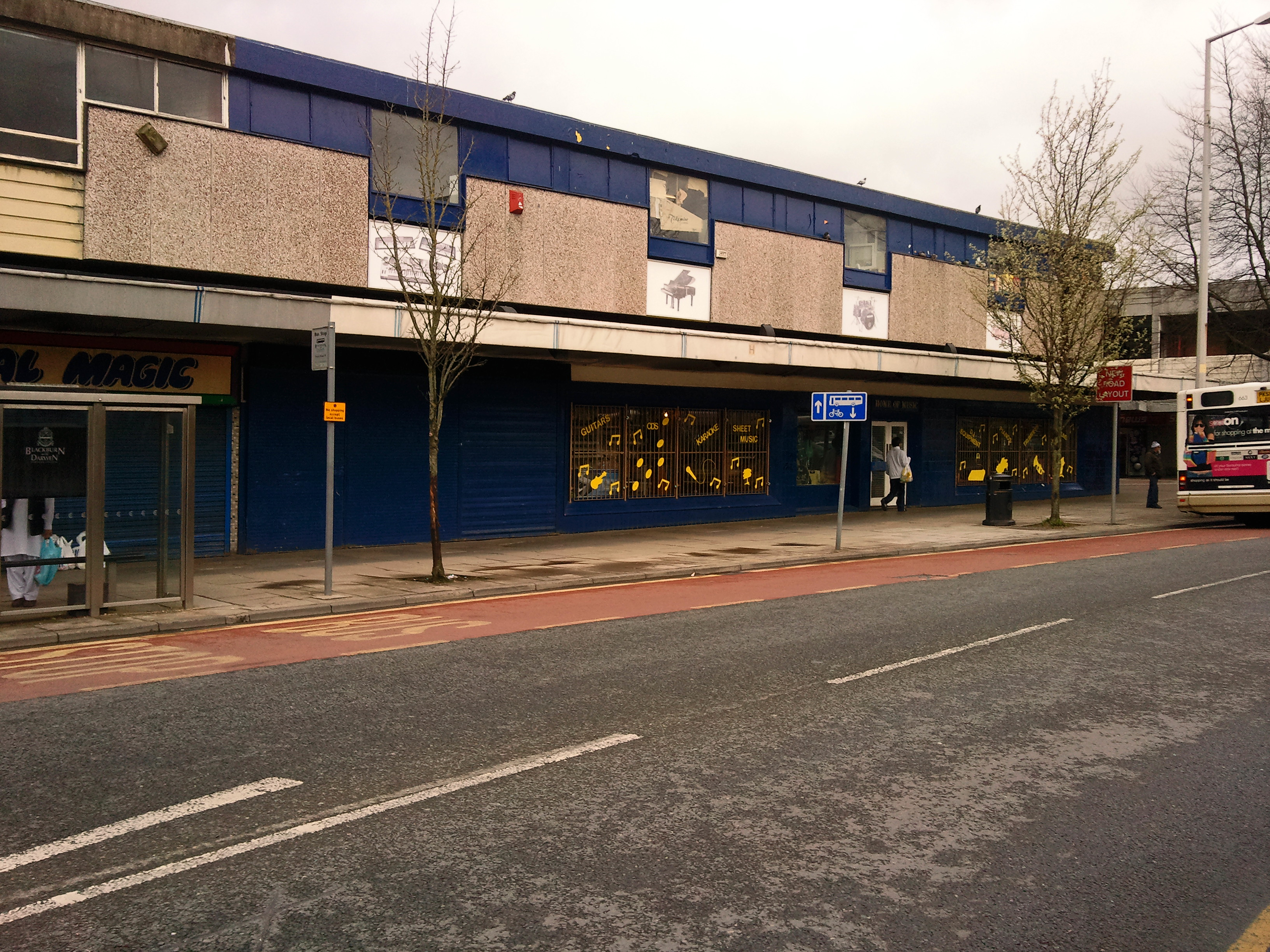
The former shop on Penny Street

Reidy's Home of Music logo

Reidy's Home of Music is a large musical instrument retailer based in Blackburn, Lancashire.

A family-run business, Reidy's Home of Music opened in 1922 and specialised in selling sheet music and musical instruments. It has since gone on to become one of the largest online music stores in the world and an iconic name in the Lancashire area. In the 1960s, in a meeting held above the Blackburn music store the decision was made to name a local music group "The Four Pennies", after "Penny Street", the street Reidy's was situated on, until 2013, when it relocated. Reidy's now stocks a wide range of musical instruments from multiple manufacturers, most notably, Fender and Yamaha.

== Relocation ==
In September 2013, Reidy's Home of Music celebrated its 90th anniversary with the official unveiling of its brand new 6,500 square foot store on Nab Lane, just off Feilden St, Blackburn. Here they expanded their guitar and piano departments, and dispensed with their CD and vinyl records departments. They introduced the Reidy's Live Stage, a permanent sound stage designed to showcase local bands and regular talent competitions, however it has also played host to well-established artists such as Wilko Johnson.

== Internet store ==
In 2001 Reidy's opened its internet store, which specialises in selling keyboards, pianos, amps and guitars among other musical instruments worldwide. It currently stocks over 30,000 items, including over 4,000 guitars and over 1,000 keyboards, making it one of the largest online music stores in the world.
