= Irina Zaritskaya =

Ukrainian pianist

Irina Zaritskaya Ірина Зарицька
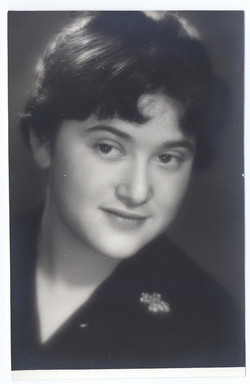
- Zaritskaya in 1960

Background information
- Born: May 2, 1939; Kiev, Ukrainian SSR, Soviet Union
- Died: July 30, 2001 (aged 62) London, England
- Genres: Classical
- Occupation: Pianist
- Instrument: Piano

Irina Zaritskaya (Ukrainian: Ірина Зарицька, romanized: Iryna Zarytska; May 2, 1939 – July 30, 2001) was a Ukrainian pianist.

== Early life and education ==
Zaritskaya started playing the piano at the Children's Music School in Kiev until 1953, and subsequently continued her studies at the Central Special Music School in Moscow Conservatory with Professor Tatiana Kestner. She graduated in 1958 and entered the Moscow Conservatory, where she was accepted into Yakov Zak's class and received lessons from Yakov Flier. She received her graduation diploma in 1963.

While still a student under Yakov Zak, Zaritskaya won second prize at the 1960 VI International Chopin Piano Competition, coming less than 1 point behind the eventual winner - Maurizio Pollini. She also won two additional awards - The Fryderyk Chopin Society Prize for the Best Performance of a Polonaise and The Polish Radio Prize for the Best Performance of a Mazurka.

== Career ==
For many years, Zaritskaya only performed within the Soviet Union, appearing with the country's best orchestras and conductors, including Kirill Kondrashin, Rudolf Barshai and Natan Rakhlin. In 1961, she appeared in Warsaw, playing Beethoven's Piano Concerto No. 4, Chopin's Piano Sonata No. 2, Kabalevsky's Piano Sonata No. 3 and a matinée recital of six preludes.

In 1972, Zaritskaya emigrated to Israel, binding her professional careers – both as a performer and teacher – with the Rubin Academy of Music. In 1985, she moved to England and settled in London. She appeared occasionally with the London Symphony Orchestra, the Royal Philharmonic Orchestra, the City of Birmingham Symphony Orchestra and accompanied violinist Boris Belkin. She primarily taught at the Royal College of Music, but also at the Yehudi Menuhin School and the Purcell School. Her students include Danny Driver, Eytan Pessen, Charles Owen, Wu Qian and Alba Ventura.

Zaritskaya's final concert appearance was on 9 August 1995, at the Jubilee 50th International Chopin Festival in Duszniki where she performed works by Scriabin, Prokofiev, Kabalevsky and Chopin.

== Personal life ==
Zaritskaya was married to violinist and current fellow and professor of the Royal College of Music, Dr. Felix Andrievsky. Her daughter is the pianist Alexandra Andrievsky.
