= Pop Gear =

1965 British film

- British theatrical release poster
- Directed by: Frederic Goode
- Written by: Roger Dunton
- Starring: Jimmy Savile (host)
- Cinematography: Geoffrey Unsworth
- Production company: Associated British-Pathé
- Distributed by: Warner-Pathé Distributors (United Kingdom); American International Pictures (United States)
- Release dates: April 9, 1965 (UK); May 1, 1965 (US)
- Running time: 68 minutes
- Country: United Kingdom
- Language: English

Pop Gear (American title: Go Go Mania) is a 1965 British music revue film, directed by Frederic Goode and written by Roger Dunton. The film is hosted by Jimmy Savile and contains live concert footage of the Beatles, and lip-synched performances of some of the British Invasion bands, including the Animals, Herman's Hermits, The Nashville Teens, Peter and Gordon, Matt Monro, Billy J. Kramer and the Dakotas, The Honeycombs, The Rockin' Berries, and The Spencer Davis Group. It was produced by Harry Field for Associated British Pathe.

== Cast ==
- Jimmy Savile as host

== Premise ==
The film is split into two segments: 1964 songs, introduced by Jimmy Savile, at the time the host of the BBC Television weekly music programme Top of the Pops, and 1965 songs, which are edited together without introductions. The Beatles material comes from the newsreel short The Beatles Come to Town (1963).

Songs and artists in order of appearance:

song	artist
"She Loves You"	The Beatles
"Little Children"	Billy J. Kramer and the Dakotas
"Make Him Mine"	Susan Maughan
"Juliet"	The Four Pennies
"The House of the Rising Sun"	The Animals
"A Little Loving"	The Fourmost
"He's in Town"	The Rockin' Berries
"Have I the Right"	The Honeycombs
"Rinky Dink"	Sounds Incorporated
"A World Without Love"	Peter and Gordon
"Walk Away"	Matt Monro
"I'm into Something Good"	Herman's Hermits
"Humpty Dumpty"	Tommy Quickly and the Remo Four
"Whatcha Gonna Do"	Billie Davis
"My Babe"	The Spencer Davis Group (featuring Steve Winwood)
"Tobacco Road"	The Nashville Teens
"What In The World's Come Over You"	The Rockin' Berries
"For Mama"	Matt Monro
"Black Girl"	The Four Pennies
"William Tell"	Sounds Incorporated
"Google Eye"	The Nashville Teens
"Eyes"	The Honeycombs
"Don't Let Me Be Misunderstood"	The Animals
"Pop Gear"	Matt Monro
"Twist and Shout"	The Beatles

== Reception ==
The Monthly Film Bulletin wrote: "This line-up of pop music groups, featuring some of the foremost successes of 1964, is unencumbered by a story or any other distractions; the various performers are merely introduced in the briefest possible manner as they appear by Jimmy Savile, and even his services are dispensed with once everyone has made his début and it becomes a matter of second time round. Proceedings open with The Beatles doing their "Yeah, yeah, yeah" number, and in due course it is these entertainers who bring the picture to a close. But these two scenes are quite divorced from the rest of this musical revue, and were obviously shot during an actual theatre performance to a live, screaming audience – very reminiscent, in fact, of the newsreel record seen some months ago. Everything else is set against a variety of severely stylised studio settings, often very bare in design. ... A change in tone-colour (though a hideous one) is provided from time to time by an electronic organ. More distinctive touches are provided by Sounds Incorporated who employ saxophones (notably in a beat version of the William Tell Overture), and by the Honeycombs, who employ a female drummer. The whole thing will no doubt have the teenagers screaming in the aisles."

Kine Weekly wrote: "More than an hour of Hit Parade material, with Jimmy Savile indulging his well-known eccentricities cannot fail to please most young audiences. ... The producer has advisably been at some pains to devise means of introducing variety info the presentation of a series of acts that are, by their very nature, inevitably similar: one trio of guitarists is very like any other. Even with the help of some futuristic and representational decor by Peter Moll, he has not always succeeded, but this is a small point in a programme where colour and movement and dance can be used prodigally to enhance a form of entertainment already so popular on records, radio and television."

Boxoffice wrote: "Although strictly for teenagers, adults will enjoy this musical as a novelty. Jimmy Saville, London disc jockey, introduces 16 British musical groups, or in a few cases singles, who appear here one after another in echo chambers, and the resulting sounds are sure to be recognized by the teen set, although most of the blasting seems the same to adults. The Beatles appear briefly – only in the opening and the closing. Added to the noisy soundtrack are the screams of an audience composed of affected teens, who are moved to no end. ... The Technicolor and Techniscope photography make excellent use of color in a limited setting, and pace and timing are fine."

Variety wrote: "Although selling pitch of this hodge-podge collection of British rock 'n' roll acts will evidently be based on inclusion of The Beatles, there's only a short bit with the group, used as introduction and close. Color and photography of the sequence, evidently made at a long-ago concert, clashes with the studio-shot remainder of the film.... AIP is pushing item as a "scream package," a bit more accurate description than most film advertising. After the first shocking appearance of Jimmy Savile, British disc jockey who emcees, sporting a bleached shoulder length thatch that outdoes Jayne Mansfield, there's little actual novelty in the noisome hour-plus bedlam. An improvement in British dentistry is evident although the next major medical project for the Royal Society of Surgeons should be dermatology considering the frequent display of acne unfortunately spotlighted by the color camera's too frequent closeups. Oddly enough, most of the male voices sound closer to soprano or falsetto than the accustomed baritone or bass. Could this be Britain's answer to Italy's "white voices"? Certainly their addiction to coiffures that look like a wigwinder's nightmare doesn't refute this question."

== Spanish version ==
For Spanish-speaking territories, director Anibal Uset shot Spanish introductions by Argentinian stars Palito Ortega and Graciela Borges to replace the Jimmy Savile introductions, and that version of the film was released in 1966 as El Rey en Londres.

== Home media ==
Pop Gear was released on DVD in 2007. It was also released on Blu-ray disc in 2020 by Kino Lorber Studio Classics, using the American title Go Go Mania.
