= Peter Erős =

Hungarian-American symphony and opera conductor

Peter Sandor Erős (22 September 1932, Budapest - 12 September 2014, Seattle) was a Hungarian-American conductor.

== Biography ==
Erős attended the Franz Liszt Academy of Music, where he studied composition with Zoltán Kodály, piano with Lajos Hernádi, chamber music with Leó Weiner, and conducting with László Somogyi.

In 1956, during the Hungarian Revolution, he emigrated to The Netherlands. At age 27, he was named associate conductor of the Amsterdam Concertgebouw Orchestra, a post he held for five years. While in Amsterdam, he assisted Otto Klemperer in opera productions for the Holland Festival. In the summers of 1960 and 1961, he served as a coach and assisted Hans Knappertsbusch at the Bayreuth Festival, and in 1961 was assistant conductor to Ferenc Fricsay for the Salzburg Festival production of Mozart’s "Idomeneo". He continued to assist Fricsay both in Salzburg and in Berlin with the RIAS Symphony Orchestra and Deutsche Grammophon through 1964. In 1965, Erős came to the United States for the first time at the invitation of George Szell to work with him and the Cleveland Orchestra as a Kulas Foundation Fellow.

His principal appointments were as music director and conductor of the Malmö Symphony Orchestra (1966–69) in Sweden, the Australian Broadcasting Commission Orchestras (1967–69, Sydney and Melbourne; 1975–79, Perth), the San Diego Symphony and La Jolla Chamber Orchestra (1971–1980), and the Aalborg Symphony Orchestra (1982–89) in Denmark.

As a guest conductor, Peter Erős appeared regularly with major symphony orchestras and opera companies on five continents, including the Chicago Symphony Orchestra, Cleveland Orchestra, Orquestra Sinfônica Brasileira, National Symphony Orchestra, Seattle Symphony Orchestra, San Francisco Symphony, Israel Philharmonic Orchestra, Royal Philharmonic Orchestra, Royal Liverpool Philharmonic Orchestra, Philharmoniker Hamburg, Stockholm Philharmonic Orchestra, Royal Swedish Opera in Stockholm, Hamburg State Opera, the Hague Residentie Orchestra, and the Scottish National Orchestra, and made nine tours of South Africa. He received ASCAP awards in 1983 and 1985 for his programming of music by American composers.

Erős came to the University of Washington School of Music in Seattle, Washington in 1989 as the Morrison Endowed Professor of Conducting and Music Director and Conductor of the University Symphony and Opera, where he taught until his retirement in 2010; up until his death, he held the honorary title of Professor Emeritus. He also taught conducting from 1960–65 at the Amsterdam Conservatory, where his pupils included Hans Vonk, Edo de Waart, and Jan Stulen, and served as Director of Orchestral and Operatic Activities at the Peabody Conservatory of Music from 1982–85.

At the personal request of Richard Wagner's granddaughter Friedelind, Peter Erős led the first set of recordings of orchestral works by Friedelind's father, Siegfried Wagner. Two discs were released on the Delysé label, featuring the Aalborg Symphony Orchestra conducted by Erős: the Symphony in C and the tone poems Glück, Und wenn die Welt voll Teufel wär (Scherzo), Weltersteinspielung and Sehnsucht. He also conducted the first recording of the opera Jesus Before Herod by Hungarian composer Gabriel von Wayditch (1888–1969) with the San Diego Symphony.

He died in Seattle in 2014, aged 81, of a cerebral hemorrhage.

Cultural offices
Preceded by Zoltan Rozsnyai	Music Director, San Diego Symphony; 1972-1980	Succeeded by David Atherton
