= Lajos Hernádi =

Hungarian pianist (1906–1986)

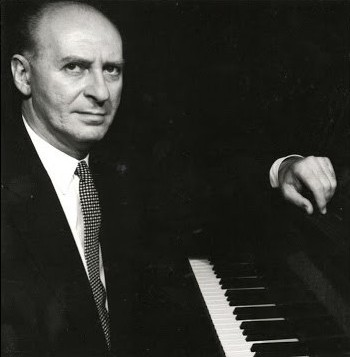

Background information
- Born: Lajos Heimlich; March 13, 1906; Budapest, Kingdom of Hungary
- Died: June 29, 1986 (aged 80) Budapest, Hungary
- Education: Franz Liszt Academy of Music
- Genres: Romanticism
- Occupation: Pianist
- Years active: 1946–1982
- Award: Kossuth Prize (1956)

Lajos Hernádi (/ˈhɛrnɑːdi/ HER-nah-dee; March 13, 1906 – June 29, 1986) was a Hungarian pianist. He played widely across post-war Europe and taught for several decades at the Franz Liszt Academy of Music, where he influenced pianists like Tamás Vásáry, Peter Erős, and György Cziffra.

== Early life and education ==
Hernádi was born in 1906 in Budapest, Kingdom of Hungary, to an Ashkenazi Jewish family. Originally named Lajos Heimlich, the family changed their German-Jewish surname as part of a larger wave of Magyarization. He studied piano as a child and joined the Budapest Academy of Music in 1924, studying under Béla Bartók.

He spent a year in 1927 studying in Berlin under Artur Schnabel before returning to Budapest, graduating from the Academy as a student of Ernst von Dohnányi. His graduation recital featured contemporary pieces including the Petrushka Suite by Stravinsky and Bartók's Piano Sonata.

== Career ==
After graduating, Hernádi performed around Hungary and Western Europe. In 1933, he was a finalist in the Franz Liszt International Piano Competition in Budapest, winning the Hungarian Radio Prize. With the rise of fascism and growing antisemitism in Europe, he performed less regularly and was eventually limited to performing small recitals from his apartment. After the German invasion of Hungary in 1944, he was deported to a forced labor camp. He was liberated by Soviet soldiers in late October 1944 during the Budapest offensive and fled to a forest near Mukachevo in present-day Ukraine. In November 1944, he performed music by Chopin to wounded Soviet soldiers in Debrecen, Hungary.

At the conclusion of the war, he returned to Budapest to teach piano at the Franz Liszt Academy of Music. Over the next few decades, Hernádi performed across nearly all of Europe, as well as in the United States and the Middle East. His solo repertoire encompassed more than a hundred works, and he performed close to thirty concertos with orchestra. He collaborated with notable conductors including Hermann Abendroth, Dean Dixon, János Ferencsik, Otto Klemperer, Georg Solti, and Carlo Zecchi. His recordings of works by Beethoven, Liszt, and Bartók are considered his most significant, and his playing style was said to be characterized by "extremely precise rhythm, grandiose raising...sentimentality, multicolour touch, and a brilliant technique." Notable students include Tamás Vásáry, Peter Erős, Tamás Ungár, Carola Grindea, and Péter Frankl, and Hernádi also influenced György Cziffra.

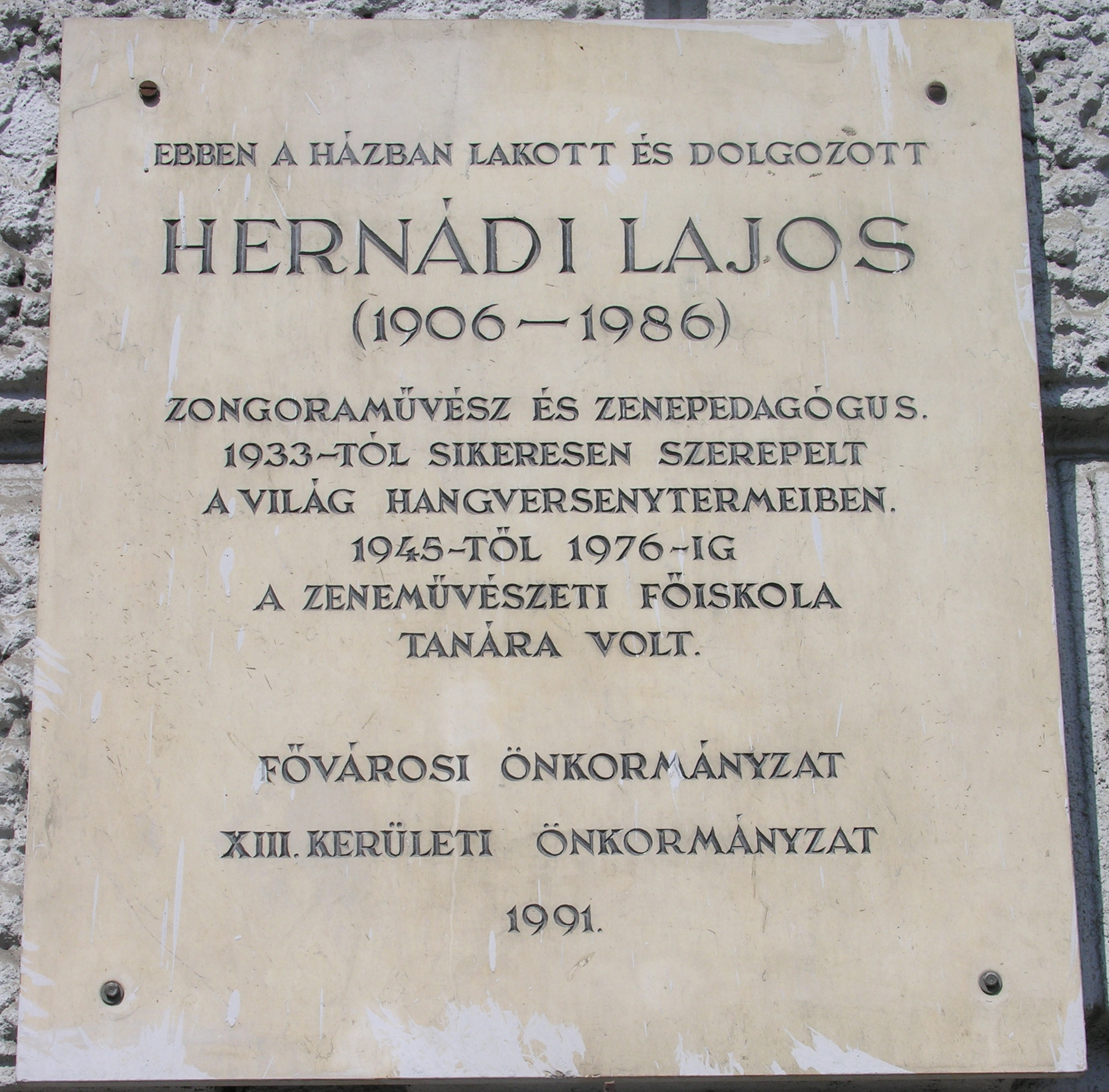
Commemorative plaque in Budapest District XIII

Hernádi also made a large contribution to Hungarian music publishing, preparing editions of works by Bach, Haydn, Mozart, Beethoven, and Czerny. In 1948 he co-edited, with István Szelényi, an anthology titled Techniques of the Masters. His 1953 essay "Bartók: the pianist, the teacher and the person" drew considerable attention and was subsequently published in French in an issue of La Revue musicale devoted to Bartók. His annotated editions of Bach's shorter preludes and inventions and of Haydn's piano sonatas remain in use as teaching materials in Hungary.

He was a juror for the International Fryderyk Chopin Piano Competition in Warsaw in 1949 and again in 1960. He was also on the jury of the first International Tchaikovsky Competition in 1958, where he voted to split the first prize between Van Cliburn and Lev Vlassenko. In 1956, he received the Kossuth Prize in recognition of his work. He retired in 1975 and continued performing until the early 1980s.

Hernádi died in Budapest on June 29, 1986, and is buried in the Farkasréti Cemetery. His personal library of sheet music bearing his own annotations was donated to the library of the Franz Liszt Academy of Music by his sons. Other manuscripts of his work are in the Van Cliburn Foundation collection.

== Publications ==
- Chopin's Piano Style from a Musicological Perspective (1942; 1949)
- Contributions to the Psychology of Practicing Piano (1947)
- Techniques of the Masters (1948)
- The Problem of Polyphonic Piano Playing (1948)
- Bartók: the Pianist, the Teacher, and the Person (1953)
- Chopin - Celebrations in Warsaw (1960)
- Some Characteristic Features of Chopin's Piano Writing (1963)
