= Moll Flanders (TV series) =

Television series

- Genre: Period drama
- Based on: Moll Flanders by Daniel Defoe
- Written by: Hugh Whitemore
- Directed by: Donald McWhinnie
- Starring: Julia Foster; Kenneth Haigh; Ian Ogilvy
- Country of origin: United Kingdom
- Original language: English
- No. of series: 1
- No. of episodes: 2

Production
- Producer: Cedric Messina
- Cinematography: Brian Tufano
- Running time: c. 205 minutes
- Production company: BBC

Original release
- Network: BBC Two
- Release: 26 November – 3 December 1975

Moll Flanders is a 1975 British historical drama television series based on the novel of the same title by Daniel Defoe. Starring Julia Foster in the title role, it originally aired on BBC 2 in two episodes.

== Cast ==
- Julia Foster as Betty / Moll Flanders
- Kenneth Haigh as Jemmy Earle
- Ian Ogilvy as Humphrey Oliver
- Diana Fairfax as Lady Verney
- Jeremy Clyde as Edward
- Madge Ryan as Mrs Oliver
- Barry Jackson as William Stubbs
- Paul Lavers as Robin
- Ania Marson as Phillipa
- Lynne Jones as Catherine
- David Battley as Henry Haydock
- Karin MacCarthy as Meg
- Patrick Newell as Thomas Woodall
- Maureen Pryor as Mrs Gill
- Geoffrey Chater as George Mace
- Jack Galloway as Andrew Bullen
- Sheila Reid as Jenny
- James Mellor as Capt. Preston
- Nelly Griffiths as Mrs Owen
- Keith Smith as Barnaby
- James Smith as Bank Clerk
- Mary Hanefey as Maid
- Clyde Pollitt as Thin Man
- Lysandre De La Haye as Child
- Sam Avent as Draper
- Roy McArthur as Card Player
- Jimmy Mac as Card Player

== Bibliography ==
- Klossner, Michael. The Europe of 1500–1815 on Film and Television: A Worldwide Filmography of Over 2,550 Works, 1895 Through 2000. McFarland & Company, 2002.
