= III International Chopin Piano Competition =

Piano competition (1937)

The Third International Fryderyk Chopin Piano Competition
- Date: 21 February – 13 March 1937
- Venue: National Philharmonic, Warsaw
- Hosted by: Warsaw Music Society
- Winner: (Soviet Union) Yakov Zak

The III International Chopin Piano Competition (Polish: III Międzynarodowy Konkurs Pianistyczny im. Fryderyka Chopina) was held from 21 February to 13 March 1937 in Warsaw. It was the last competition before the outbreak of World War II, and the competition would not be held again until 1949.

80 pianists from 22 countries took part in the competition, including two participants from Japan. Contestants could choose between pianos manufactured by Bechstein, Bösendorfer, Pleyel and Steinway. Soviet pianist Yakov Zak was awarded the first prize.

== Awards ==
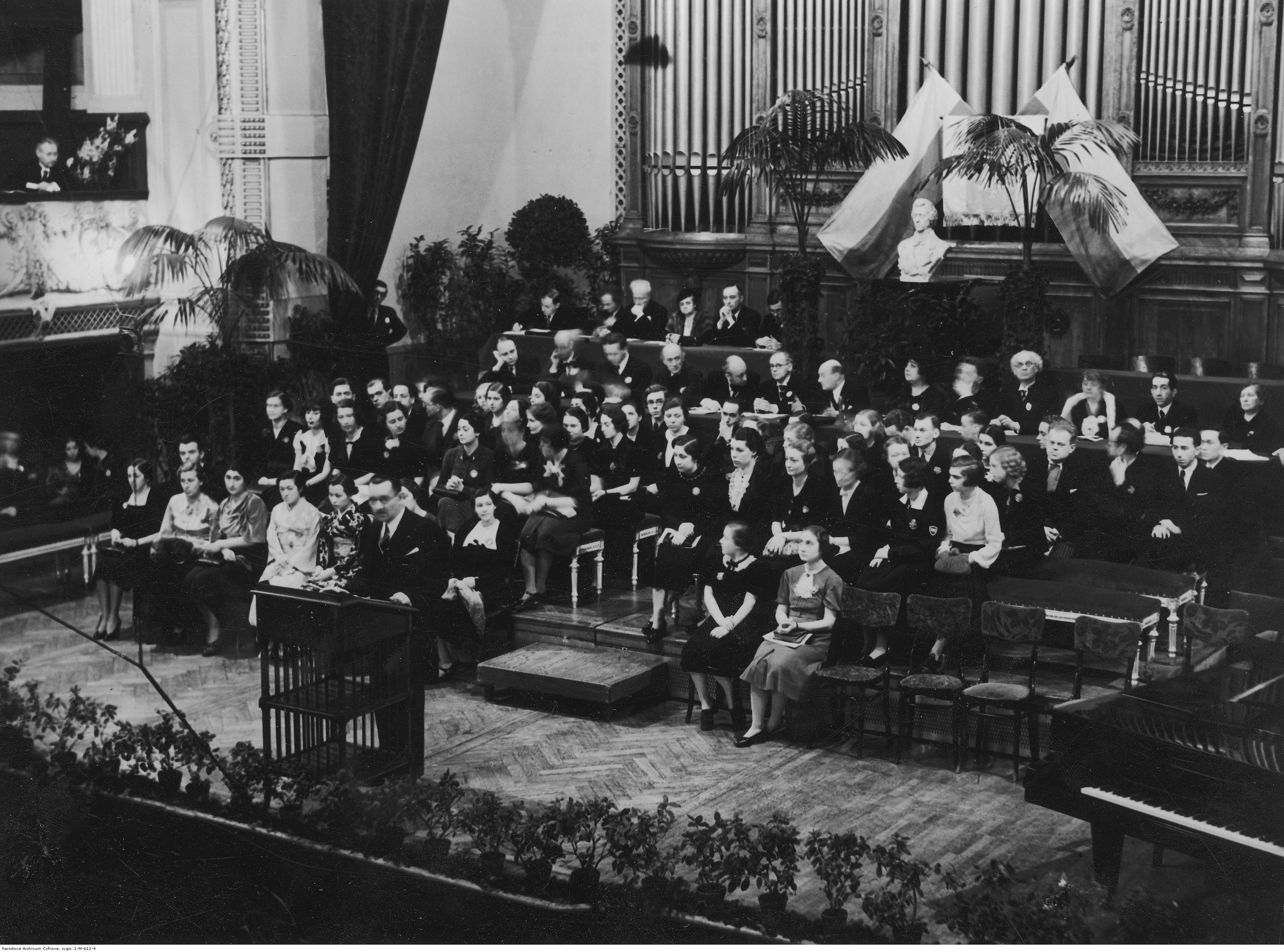
Władysław Korsak, Deputy Minister of the Interior, giving the inaugural speech in the Warsaw Philharmonic

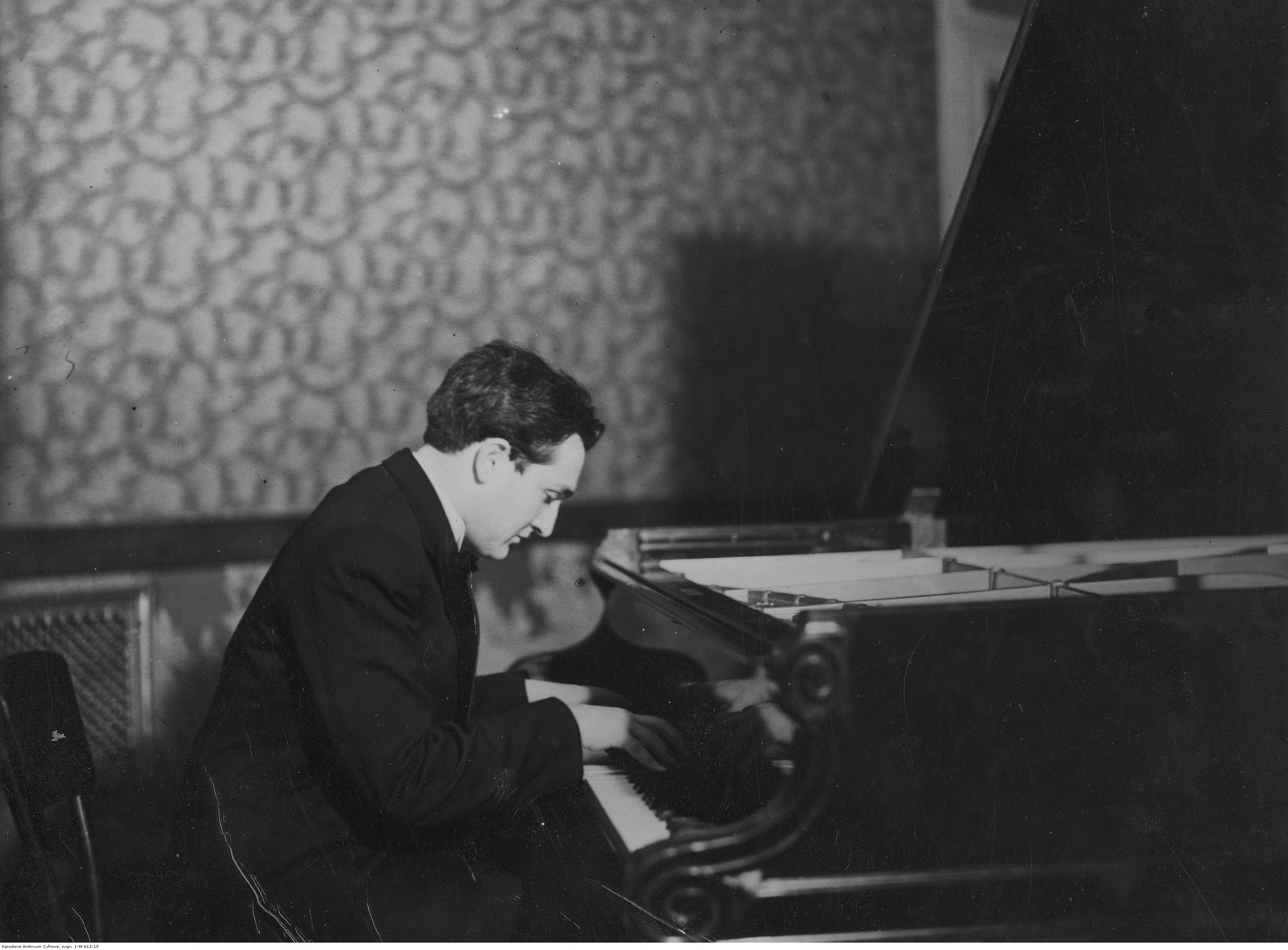
Yakov Zak, winner of the first prize, during the competition

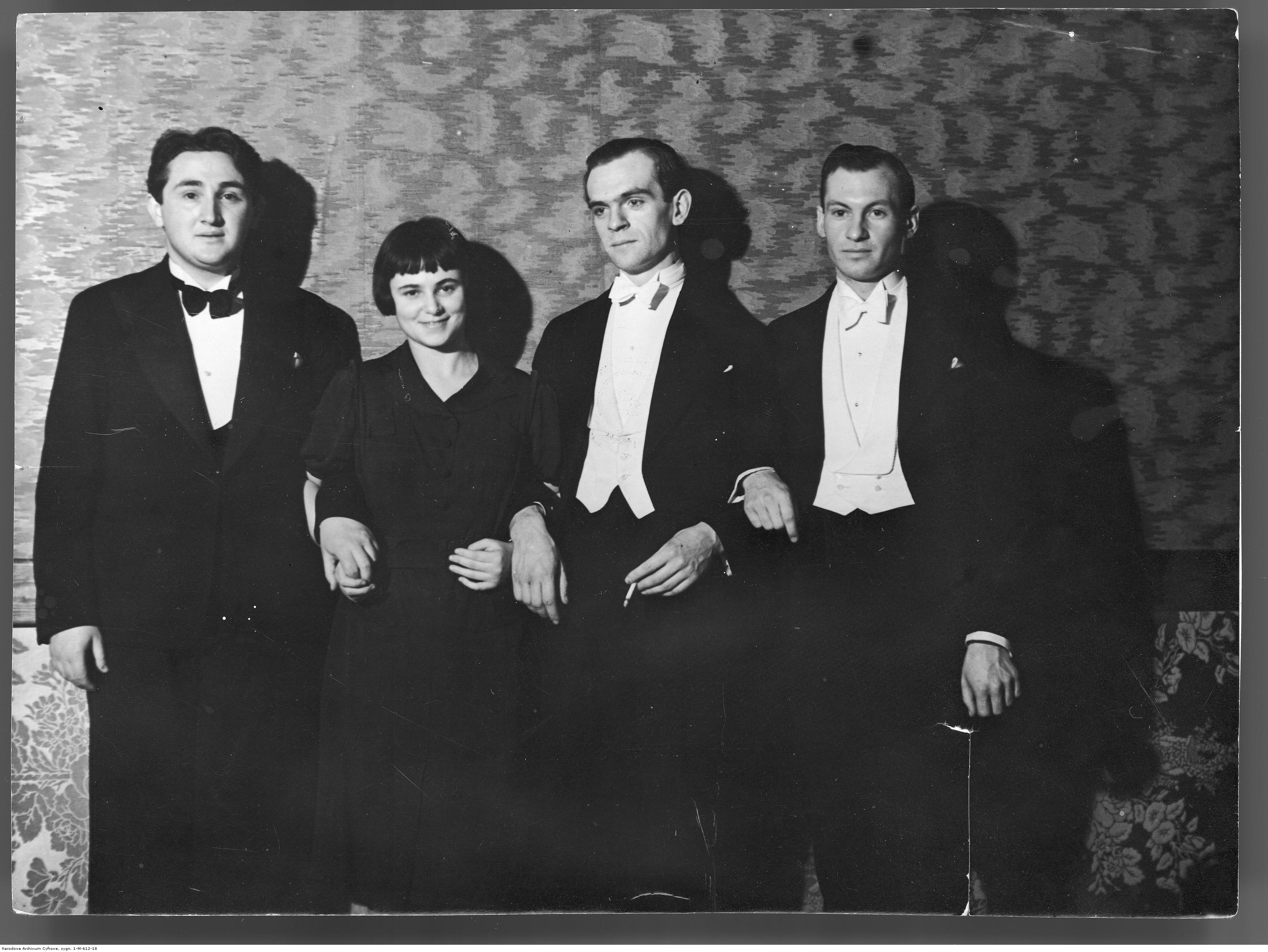
Laureates of the competition: Yakov Zak, Rosa Tamarkina, Witold Małcużyński and Lance Dossor

Out of 80 pianists in the elimination stage, 21 were admitted to the final, where they performed two consecutive movements of one of Chopin's two piano concertos with the Warsaw Philharmonic.

The two female Japanese pianists Miwa Kai and Chieko Hara received great acclaim among critics and the public. When news broke that Hara, who reached the final, was not among the prize-winners and was merely awarded an honorable mention, a commotion broke out. Fearing that the frenzied crowd would cause damage to the Philharmonic, industrialist Stanisław Meyer sponsored a special "audience award" for Hara.

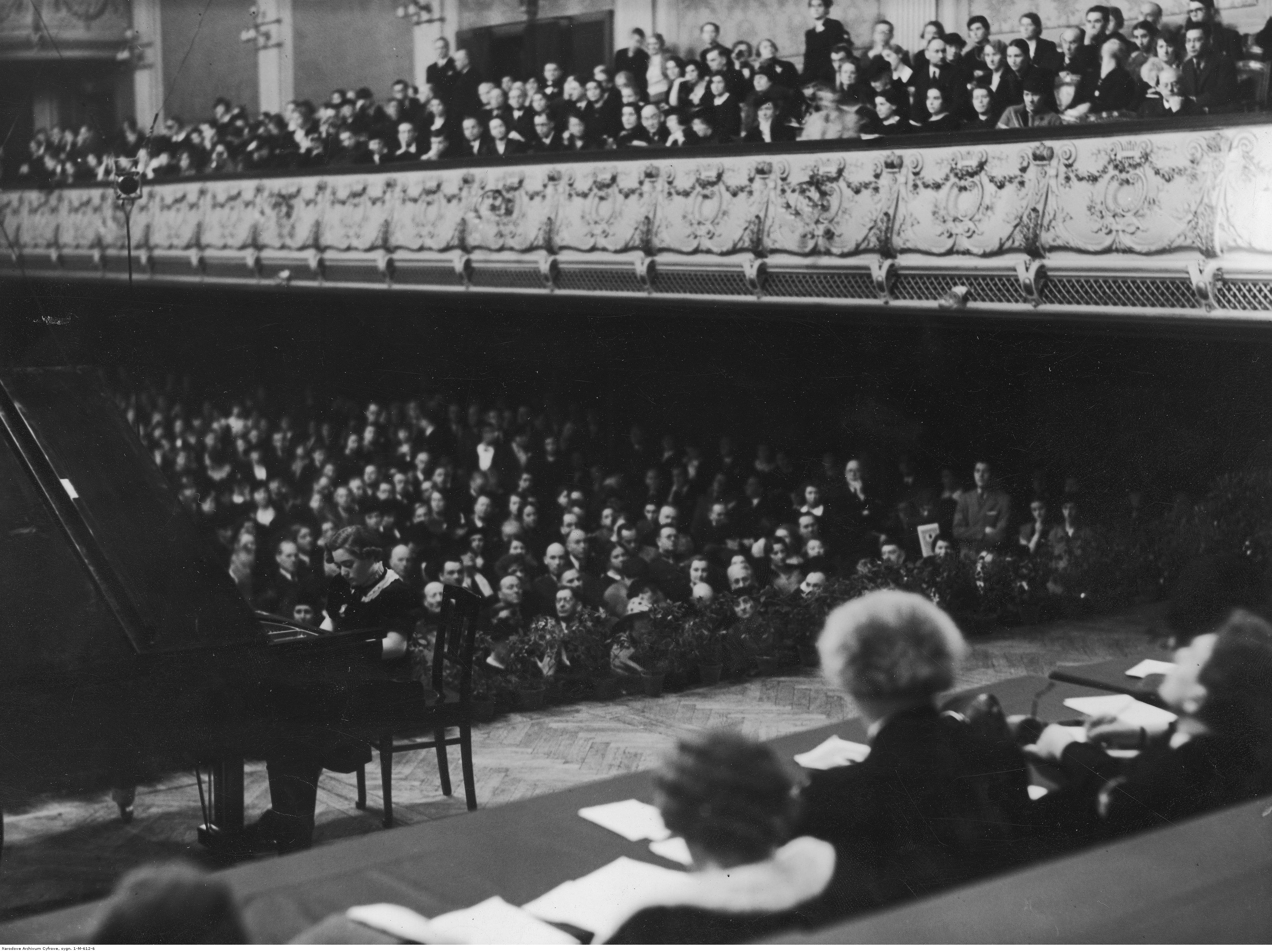
16-year-old Evi Wächter from Austria was the first pianist to perform in the elimination stage

The following prizes were awarded:

Prize		Winner	
1st	5,000zł	Yakov Zak	Soviet Union
2nd	2,500zł	Rosa Tamarkina	Soviet Union
3rd	2,500zł	Witold Małcużyński	Poland
4th	2,000zł	Lance Dossor	United Kingdom
5th	2,000zł	Agi Jambor	Hungary
6th	1,000zł	Edith Axenfeld	Germany
7th	1,000zł	Monique de La Bruchollerie	France
8th	500zł	Jan Ekier	Poland
9th	500zł	Tatiana Goldfarb	Soviet Union
10th	500zł	Olga Iliwicka	Poland
11th	500zł	Pierre Maillard-Verger	France
12th	250zł	Lélia Gousseau	France
13th	200zł	Halina Kalmanowicz	Poland
HM		Jan Bereżyński	Poland
HM		Maria Bilińska-Riegerowa	Poland
HM		Márta Blaha	Hungary
HM		György Faragó	Hungary
HM		Colette Gaveau	France
HM		Zbigniew Grzybowski	Poland
HM		Chieko Hara	Japan
HM		Natalia Hornowska-Pęzińska	Poland
HM		Nina Jemelianowa	Soviet Union
HM		Helena Landau	Poland
HM		Fryderyk Portnoj	Poland
HM		Paulina Szmukler	Poland
HM		Viktorie Švihlíková	Czechoslovakia
HM		Marie Aimée Warrot	France
HM		Jozsef Weingarten	Hungary

Two special prizes were awarded:

Special prize		Winner	
Best Performance of Mazurkas	250zł	Yakov Zak	Soviet Union
Best Performances of a Sonata	500zł	Lance Dossor	United Kingdom

== Jury ==
The jury consisted of:

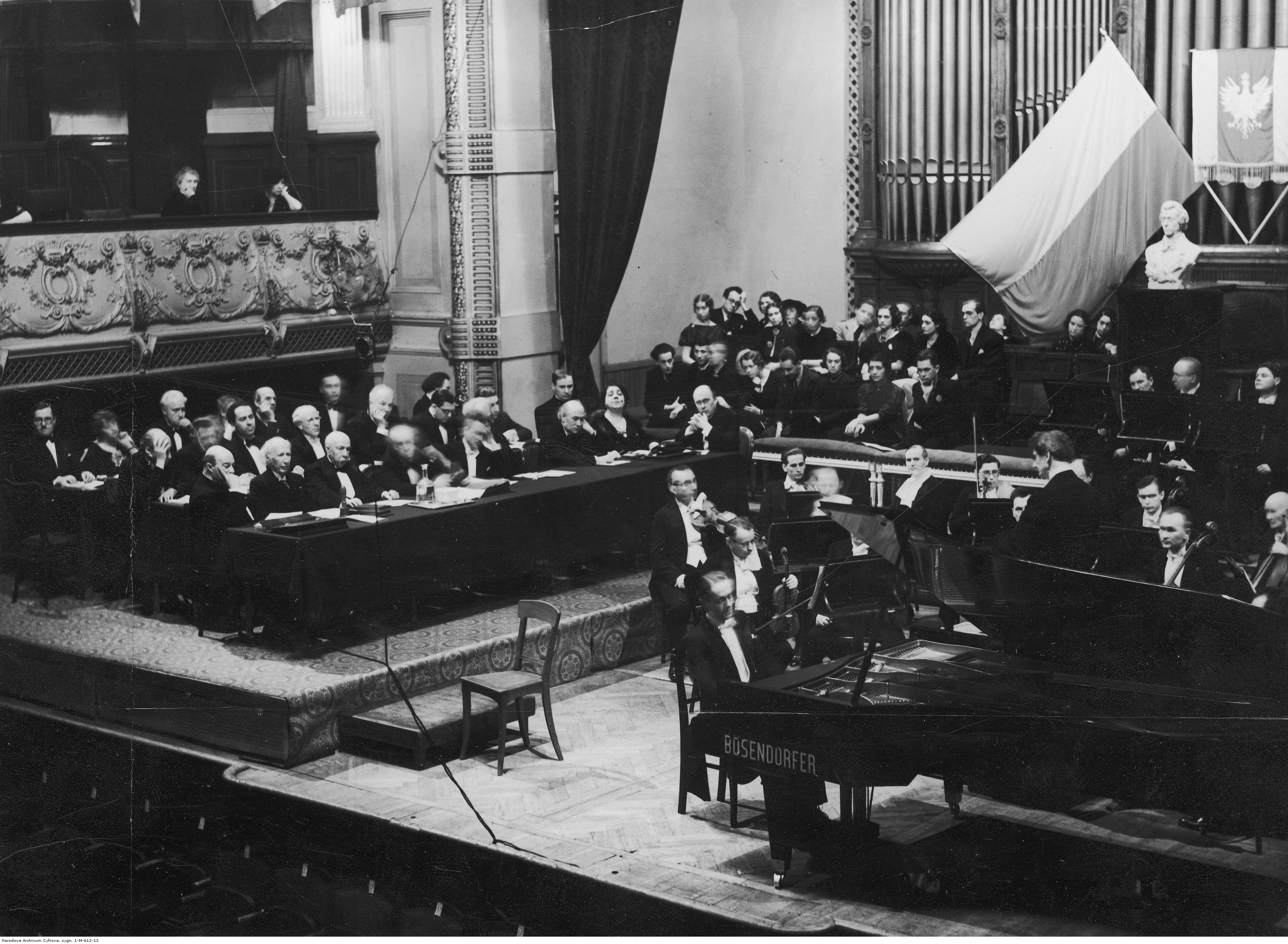
The final of the competition. The jury sits on the left.

- (Italy) Guido Agosti
- (Germany) Wilhelm Backhaus (vice-chairman)
- (Italy) Attilo Brugnoli
- (Poland) Zofia Buckiewiczowa
- (Poland) Marian Dąbrowski
- (Poland) Zbigniew Drzewiecki
- (Switzerland) Emil Frey
- (Germany) Alfred Hoehn
- (Hungary) Imre Keeri-Szano
- (France) Lazare Lévy
- (Greece) Loris Margaritis
- (Poland) Eugeniusz Morawski-Dąbrowa
- (Soviet Union) Heinrich Neuhaus
- (Switzerland) Marie Panthès
- (France) Isidor Philipp (vice-chairman)
- (Poland) Zofia Rabcewicz
- (Poland) Lucyna Robowska
- (Germany) Richard Rössler
- (Austria) Emil von Sauer (vice-chairman)
- (Latvia) Paul Schubert
- (Hungary) Imre Stefaniai
- (Bulgaria) Andrei Stojanow
- (Poland) Stefan Śledziński
- (Poland) Józef Śmidowicz
- (Brazil) Magda Tagliaferro
- (Poland) Józef Turczyński
- (Poland) Adam Wieniawski (chairman)
- (Poland) Bolesław Woytowicz (secretary)
- (Poland) Jerzy Żurawlew
