= Lance Dossor =

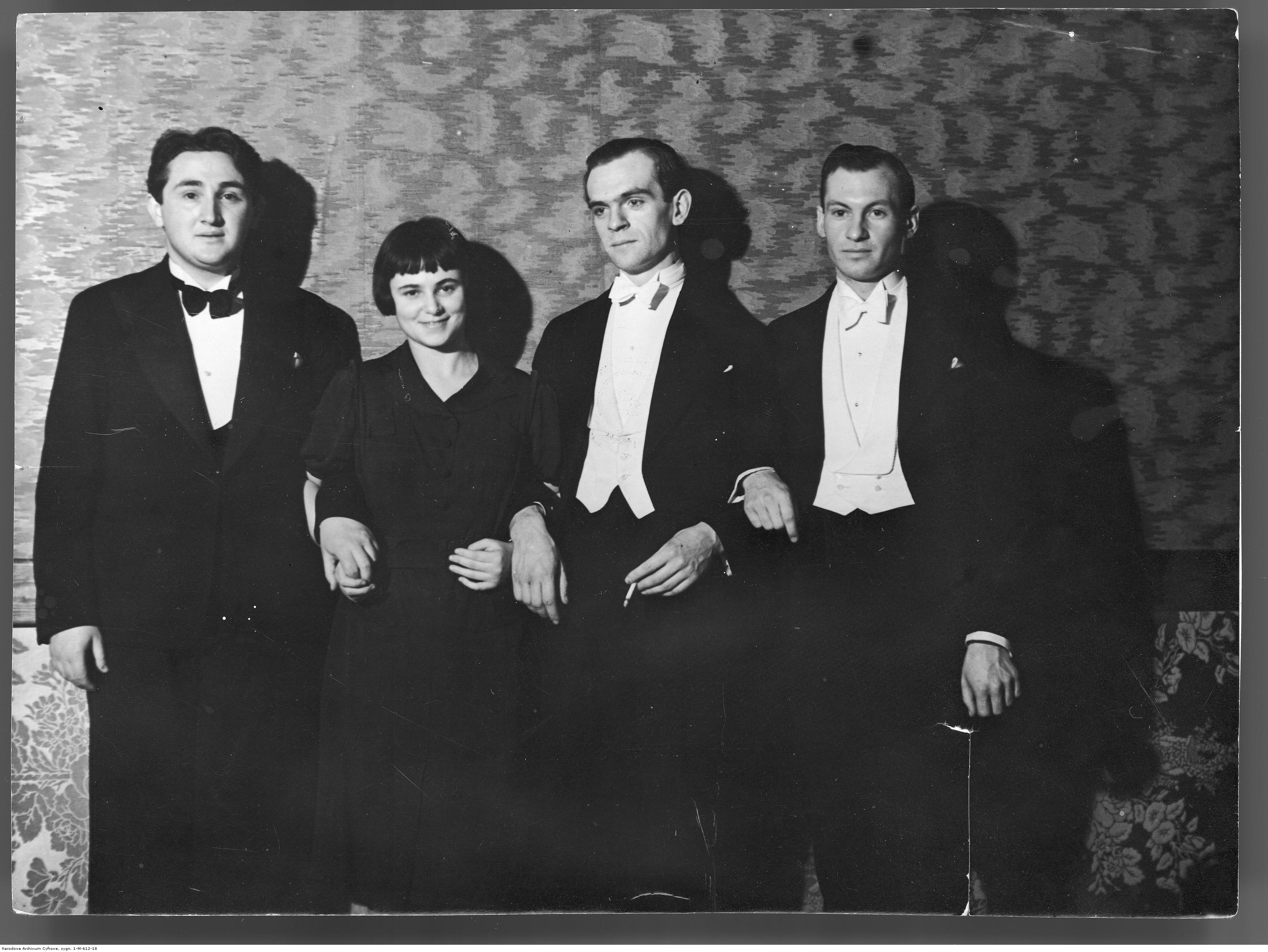
- Lance Dossor (far right), February 1937

Background information
- Born: Harry Lancelot Dossor; 14 May 1916; Weston-super-Mare, England, United Kingdom
- Died: 3 December 2005 (aged 89) Adelaide, Australia
- Genres: Classical music
- Occupations: Virtuoso pianist, pedagogue
- Instrument: Piano
- Years active: 1936–1999

Harry Lancelot Dossor (14 May 1916 – 3 December 2005) was a British-born classical music concert pianist and teacher who emigrated to Australia in May 1953.

== Biography ==
Harry Lancelot Dossor was born on 14 May 1916 in Weston-super-Mare, United Kingdom, the third child of a jeweller who was also a distinguished amateur tenor. Dossor was educated at Seaford College and matriculated at the University of London. In 1932 he obtained an open scholarship to the Royal College of Music, where he studied piano with Herbert Fryer and composition with Herbert Howells.

In 1936 Dossor was awarded the Medal of the Worshipful Company of Musicians, given only every three years to the most outstanding student. He won the 1936 Franz Liszt Prize at the Vienna International Piano Competition, and in the following year the Sonata Prize and overall Fourth Prize in the III International Chopin Piano Competition in 1937. In 1938 he was awarded fourth prize in the Ysaye Competition in Belgium - the first three places going to Emil Gilels, Moura Lympany and Yakov Flier.

He later recounted the tale that, while he was still a student, he obtained entry to a rehearsal of one of Sergei Rachmaninoff's concerts in London. He was introduced to Rachmaninoff afterwards by the British pianist Cyril Smith as "... a very promising young pianist who has recently been successful in the Chopin prize." Rachmaninoff responded in his heavy Russian accent "Ah, but who were the judges?"

During the Second World War, from 1939, Dossor served in the Royal Artillery in the Middle East, Italy and Germany, where, because of health problems, he was transferred to Entertainments National Service Association (ENSA) to help provide concerts of classical music for the services. In November 1940 he married Diana Levinson, a harpist, who had been a fellow student at the Royal College of Music.

After leaving military service in 1946, he became a member of the Royal College of Music's teaching staff. He resumed his performance career (solo recitals, concertos and chamber music) playing with various British Orchestras under the batons of Sir John Barbirolli, Sir Adrian Boult, Sir Malcolm Sargent, Rafael Kubelík and Nikolai Malko. He was a soloist for the Royal Philharmonic Society, the Henry Wood Promenade Concerts and, in 1950, he was invited to Israel for ten performances of the Brahms' Second Piano Concerto with the Israel Philharmonic Orchestra. In 1947 he replaced Dinu Lipatti, who had been taken ill prior to his first London concert.

In May 1953 Dossor accepted an initial three-year appointment as principal teacher of piano at the Elder Conservatorium of Music, University of Adelaide, by which time he and Diana had two children. He remained at the conservatorium until his retirement in 1979. Dossor was known in Australia as a soloist and also in chamber music, including an 18-year partnership with expatriate British cellist, James Whitehead. Together with the violinist, Ladislav Jasek, they also performed as the Elder Trio. Dossor performed in a piano duo with Romola Costantino and served as president of the Adelaide Branch of the Australian Society for Keyboard Music.

His refined sense of colour was used to exquisite effect in his performances of Chopin, while his affinity with the Russian repertoire was revealed in his greatly admired performances of Rachmaninoff. His impact on the musical life of Australia, and Adelaide in particular, was considerable, both through his performances and his numerous students. He was associated with all the Australian state orchestras and took part in festivals in Sydney, Melbourne, Perth and Adelaide.

He did not leave many recordings, as he felt that a recording was only how he had performed on a particular day, and not necessarily the best performance that he could give. The Australian Broadcasting Corporation recorded a number of his concert broadcasts, but few were issued on record.

Lance Dossor had very decided ideas on music. He loved Schubert and Brahms, but had no patience with Bruckner. His ideal composer was Bach. He said "If I had to make do with only one composer for the rest of my life, it would have to be Bach. His works are pure music". In 2003, the University of Adelaide gave him a Distinguished Alumni award "in recognition of his outstanding contribution to the university and to his profession as performing artist and teacher."

Although officially retired, Lance Dossor carried on teaching part-time and occasionally performing until 1999, when increasing deafness forced him to give up. He died on 3 December 2005 in Adelaide, at the age of 89. He was survived by Diana (née Levinson) Dossor and their three children.
