= Yoon Kuk Lee =

Korean Austrian musician (born 1953)

Yoon Kuk Lee (Korean: 이윤국; born August 24, 1953) is a South Korean-born Austrian Composer and conductor.

== Education ==
Lee was born in Gongju, Chungcheongnam-do, South Korea to a musical family. His earliest music instruction was given to him by his mother. He immigrated to New York with his family as a teenager where he graduated from high school and then enrolled at Williams College, earning a degree, summa cum laude, in philosophy and music in 1976.

Lee relocated to Austria for post-graduate studies in conducting and composition at the Salzburg University of Dramatic Arts, Salzburg Mozarteum University of Music, under the tutelage and mentoring of renowned teachers Sándor Végh, Gerhard Wimberger, Nikolaus Harnoncourt and Herbert von Karajan.

== Career ==
In 1982, Lee was awarded the highest prize by the Austria Radio Broadcasting (ORF) in its music competition. Shortly thereafter, he was offered a position as a member of the faculty at the Mozarteum University of Performing Arts where he has taught up to the present.

Lee's conducting career, which began in 1987, developed rapidly with invitations to collaborate with numerous orchestras. In 1992, Yoon Kuk Lee was offered the challenge of creating a new chamber orchestra on the European music scene, which was christened the Salzburger Kammerphilharmonie. Engaging fine professional musicians around him as their musical director, Lee went on to develop highly innovative concert series in Salzburg and beyond.

One particular collaboration was a project with pianist Cyprien Katsaris between 1996 and 1999 to perform and record the complete works by Mozart for piano and orchestra, all of the concertos but other, lesser known compositions. The resulting 15 CD production for the Piano 21 label was the first of its kind in recording history. Lee's release of the Sinfonias by C.P.E. Bach (Naxos) in 1995 brought him lasting global recognition. The album was chosen as one of the 10 finest CDs by Gramophone magazine and the WQXR FM in New York.

In 1999, in response to the strong proposal by Ban Ki-moon, Lee founded the Austrian-Korean Philharmonic in Vienna and served as its artistic director until 2003. In 2002, Lee became chief conductor of the Festival International Echternach (Luxembourg) Chamber Orchestra and served in that function until 2005. From 2008 to the present, Lee has provided leadership as music director for the St. Gellert Music Festival in Szeged, Hungary.

Lee resides in Salzburg with his wife, Anne Marie, and their son, Yooann.

== Cultural offices ==
Cultural Offices	Year
Artistic Director, Salzburger Kammerphilharmonie	1992 - 2008
Artistic Director, Austrian-Korean Philharmonie Vienna	1999 - 2003
Orchestre de Chambre du Festival d'Echternach (Luxembourg)	2002 - 2005
Music Director, St.Gellert Festival, Szeged (Hungary)	2008–Present

== Discography ==
- 1995: C.Ph.E. Bach. Sinfonias, Wq183, Nos. 1–4. Salzburger Kammerphilharmonie (Naxos)
- 1997: Korean Melodies. Salzburger Kammerphilharmonie (Samsung Classics)
- 1999: Nostalgia. George Enesco Philharmonic Orchestra Bucharest (Samsung Classics)
- 2001: Music from Villa Hügel. Salzburger Kammerphilharmonie (Ars)
- 2001: W.A.Mozart. Piano Concertos No.13 and No. 22. Cyprien Katsaris, Salzburger Kammerphilharmonie (Piano 21)
- 2003: W.A.Mozart. Piano Concertos No. 17 and No. 23. Cyprien Katsaris, Salzburger Kammerphilharmonie (Piano 21)
- 2004: Bach and Sons. Piano Concertos. Cyprien Katsaris, Orchestre de Chambre du Festival d'Echternach
- 2006: W.A.Mozart. Piano Concertos No. 18 and No. 24. Cyprien Katsaris, Salzburger Kammerphilharmonie (Piano 21)
- 2006: W.A.Mozart. Piano Concertos No. 16 and No. 21. Cyprien Katsaris, Salzburger Kammerphilharmonie (Piano 21)
- 2006: W.A.Mozart. Piano Concertos No. 16 and No. 21. Cyprien Katsaris, Salzburger Kammerphilharmonie (Piano 21)
- 2007: W.A.Mozart. Bassoon Concerto and Divertimento in B major KV 287. Zarko Perisic´, Salzburger Kammerphilharmonie
- 2008: W.A.Mozart. Piano Concertos No. 8, No. 14 and No. 15. Cyprien Katsaris, Salzburger Kammerphilharmonie (Piano 21)
- 2009: W.A.Mozart. Piano Concertos No. 7 and No. 10. Cyprien Katsaris, Eung-Gu Kim, Mari Ota, Salzburger Kammerphilharmonie (Piano 21)
- 2010: W.A.Mozart. Piano Concertos No. 27, No. 5 and Rondo in D major. Cyprien Katsaris, Salzburger Kammerphilharmonie (Piano 21)

== Film music ==
- Hannah (a film by Reinhard Schwabenitzky)
- Eine perfekte Hochzeit (a film by Reinhard Schwabenitzky)
- Eine perfekte Scheidung (a film by Reinhard Schwabenitzky)
- The prince of Central Park (Hollywood production)
