= Juliet (The Four Pennies song) =

Single by The Four Pennies
- B-side: "Tell Me Girl"
- Released: February 1964
- Recorded: 1964
- Studio: Philips (London)
- Genre: Pop
- Length: 2:18
- Label: Philips
- Songwriter(s): Lionel Morton, Fritz Fryer, Mike Wilsh
- Producer(s): Johnny Franz

The Four Pennies singles chronology
"Do You Want Me To" (1964)	"Juliet" (1964)	"I Found Out the Hard Way" (1964)

"Juliet" is a pop song made famous by the band The Four Pennies. The track was recorded in 1964.

== History ==
The tune had been written by Mike Wilshaw and he and Lionel Morton and Fritz Fryer developed it into a song, named after Fryer's 2 year old niece. It was performed by the band in 1963 as their winning entry in a talent contest, leading to a recording session for Philips Records.

The ballad was originally released as the B-side to "Tell Me Girl", but after receiving airplay the single was reissued with the sides flipped. "Juliet" was released as a single in the UK in February 1964 on the Philips label. Produced by Johnny Franz, "Juliet" was the Four Pennies' second hit single. It reached number one in the UK Singles Chart on 21 May 1964, stayed there for one week, but spent fifteen weeks in the chart. It peaked at #3 on the New Zealand Lever hit parade.

"Juliet" was the only 1964 number one by a UK group not to chart in the United States.

"Juliet" proved to be the group's only Top 10 hit. The Four Pennies reached the Top 20 three more times after this, but never had another really successful single. The group folded in the autumn of 1966, after their last single release, written by the ex-Springfields member Tom Springfield — "No More Sad Songs for Me" — failed to chart.

== See also ==
- List of UK Singles Chart number ones of the 1960s
