= Yakov Zak =

Soviet pianist (1913–1976)

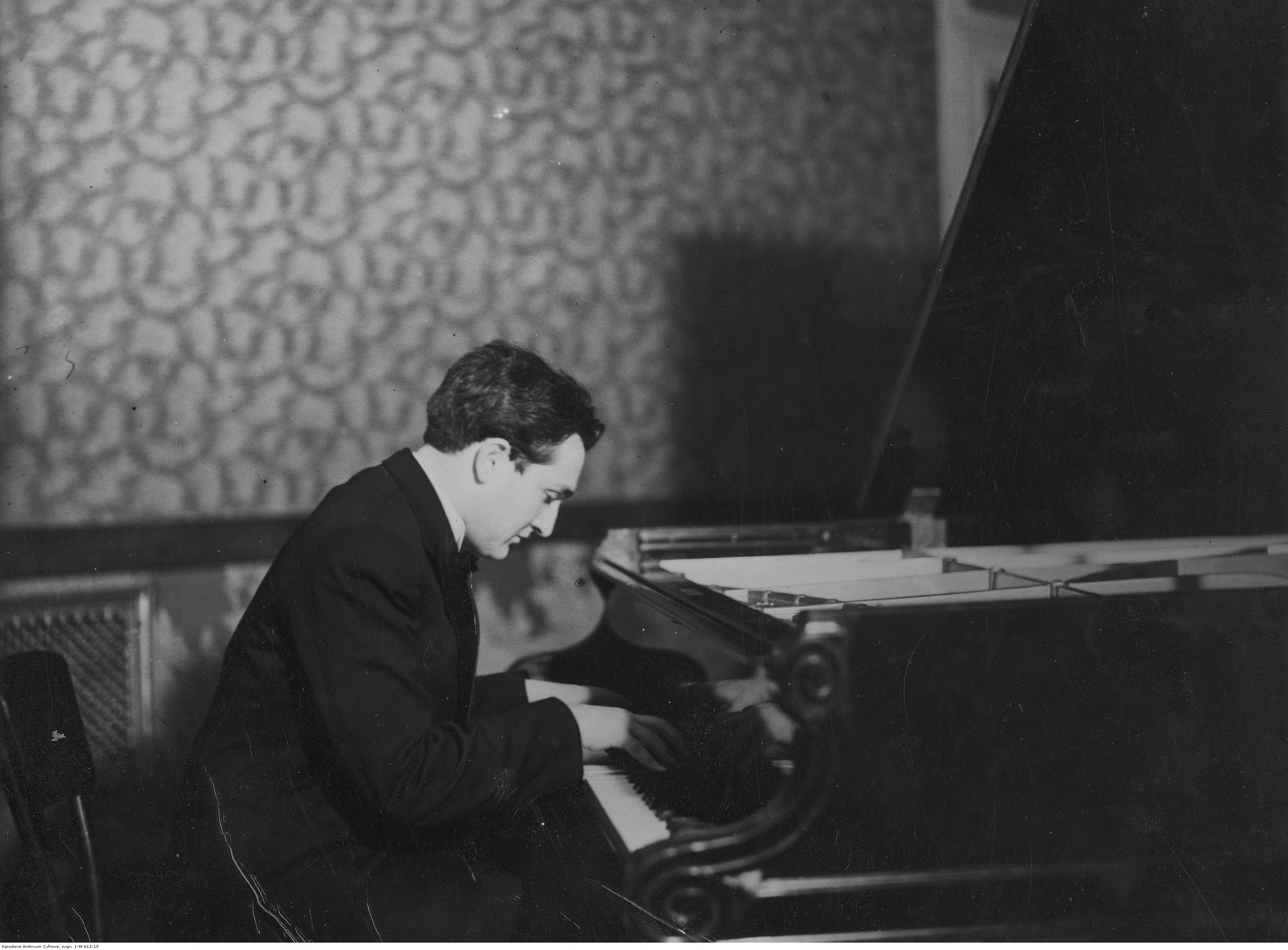
Yakov Zak in 1937

Yakov Izrailevich Zak (Russian: Яков Израилевич Зак; 20 November [O.S. 7 November] 1913 – 28 June 1976) was a Soviet pianist and pedagogue. People's Artist of the USSR (1966).

== Life ==
Born in Odessa, Zak studied piano at the Odessa Conservatory with Maria Starkhova, took classes on special harmony with Mykola Vilinsky, and later studied with Heinrich Neuhaus in Moscow, graduating in 1935. Having made his debut in 1935, he rose to prominence when he won First Prize and the Mazurka Prize at the III International Chopin Piano Competition in 1937. From 1935, Zak taught at the Moscow Conservatory, becoming a professor in 1947 and being granted a chair in 1965. His pupils include Eliso Virsaladze, Alexandr Sklioutovski, Irina Zaritskaya, Nikolai Petrov, Evgeny Mogilevsky, Svetlana Navasardyan, Lyubov Timofeyeva, Valery Afanassiev, Ludmila Knezkova-Hussey, Vladimir Bakk, and Youri Egorov.
