= Cyprien Katsaris =

French-Cypriot pianist (born 1951)

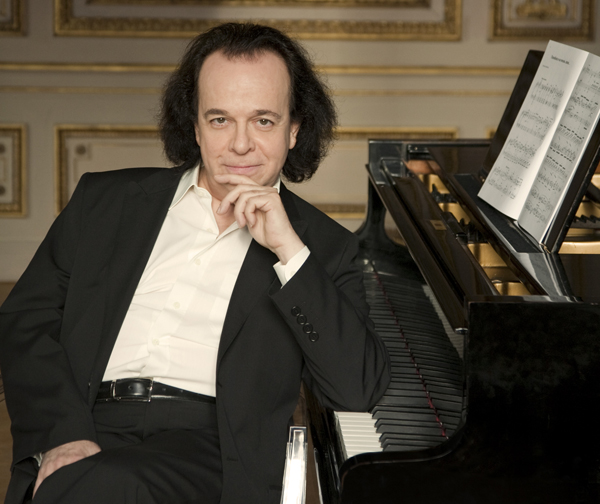

Background information
- Born: 5 May 1951 (age 74); Marseille, France
- Genres: Classical
- Occupations: Pianist, composer, virtuoso, teacher
- Instrument: Piano
- Years active: 1966–present
- Labels: Piano 21, Schott Music, Teldec, Telefunken, Sony Classical, EMI, Deutsche Grammophon, DECCA, BMG/RCA, Pavane Records.
- Website: www.cyprienkatsaris.net

Cyprien Katsaris (Greek: Κυπριανός Κατσαρής; born 5 May 1951) is a French-Cypriot virtuoso pianist, teacher and composer. Amongst his teachers were Monique de la Bruchollerie, a student of Emil von Sauer, who had been a pupil of Franz Liszt. He is known for his refined sound, extreme command of voicing, and virtually effortless physical mastery of technique.

== Biography ==
Katsaris was born in Marseille, France, the son of greek businessman Erotokritos Katsaris and his wife Niki (née Papadopoulos). He first began to play the piano when he was four, in Douala, Cameroon, where he grew up and his father was in the business of exporting peanut oil and soap. His first teacher was Marie-Gabrielle Louwerse.

He studied piano at the Paris Conservatoire with Aline van Barentzen (a pupil of Élie-Miriam Delaborde, son of Charles-Valentin Alkan), and Monique de la Bruchollerie (a pupil of Emil von Sauer, who was a pupil of Franz Liszt). Briefly, Katsaris studied under György Cziffra. In 1969, Katsaris won the piano First Prize at the Conservatoire. As well as piano, Katsaris studied chamber music with René Leroy and Jean Hubeau, and he won First Prize for this in 1970.

Katsaris gave his first public concert in Paris, at the Théâtre des Champs-Élysées on 8 May 1966. He performed the Hungarian Fantasy by Liszt, with the Orchestre Symphonique d'Ile-de-France conducted by René-Pierre Chouteau. Since then he has gone on to perform with many orchestras and conductors frequently.

Katsaris was the second musician to record the complete Liszt transcriptions of Beethoven's nine symphonies, after İdil Biret – reissued by Warner Classics in 2006. He has also recorded the music of Mozart, Chopin, Grieg, and other composers, including the rare piano version of Mahler's Das Lied von der Erde with Brigitte Fassbaender and Thomas Moser.

In 2001, Katsaris created his own recording label, Piano 21. In 2011, he performed a concert with French baritone David Serero in Paris.

== Awards ==
- 1970: Albert Roussel Foundation Prize (Paris)
- 1972: Prize-winner at the Queen Elisabeth International Music Competition of Belgium
- 1972: Alex de Vries Foundation Prize (Antwerp)
- 1974: First Prize in the International Cziffra Competition (Versailles)
- 1977: International Young Interpreters Rostrum-UNESCO (Bratislava)
- 1997: Artist of UNESCO for Peace
- 2000: Knight of the Order of Arts and Letters (France)
- 2001: Médaille Vermeil de la Ville de Paris
- 2009: Commandeur de l’Ordre de Mérite du Grand-Duché de Luxembourg
- 2011: Nemitsas Prize (Cyprus)

== Discography ==
Comprehensive discography of recordings under the label Piano 21:

1. KR 622 : Allegro. The Original Motion Picture Soundtrack
2. P21 001 : Beethoven • The Creatures of Prometheus, op. 43
3. P21 003 • (2 CD) : In Memoriam Chopin 150th Anniversary • Live at Carnegie Hall, New York City
4. P21 004 : Sergei Bortkiewicz • Piano Works
5. P21 007 : Bach Recital • Vol. 1 • Original Works
6. P21 009-N : The Complete Mozart Piano Concertos • Vol. 1
7. P21 010-N : The Complete Mozart Piano Concertos • Vol. 2
8. P21 011-N : Live at Festival International d’Echternach (Luxembourg) • 7 July 1979 • A Film by Claude Chabrol
9. P21 012-N : Live at Carnegie Hall, New York City • In Memoriam Chopin • 17 October 1999
10. P21 013 : Bach & Sons • 5 Piano Concertos
11. P21 014-A : Beethoven • Concerto No. 3 op. 37 • Sonatas Nos. 31 & 12
12. P21 015 : A Tribute to Cyprus
13. P21 016-A : Schumann • Vol. 1 • Live Recordings
14. P21 017-N : Bach • Vol. 2 • Transcriptions
15. P21 018 : Mozart Transcriptions
16. P21 019 : The Mozart Family
17. P21 020-A • (2 CD) : Russian Music • Vol. 1
18. P21 021-N : The Complete Mozart Piano Concertos • Vol. 3
19. P21 022-A : Liszt • Vol. 10 Liszt I • The Philadelphia Orchestra, Eugene Ormandy
20. P21 023-A • (2 CD) : Scriabin • Vol. 19 • The Complete Dances
21. P21 024-A • (2 CD) : French Music • Vol. 2 • De Louis XIII à Boulez
22. P21 025-N : The Complete Mozart Piano Concertos • Vol. 4
23. P21 026-N : The Complete Mozart Piano Concertos • Vol. 5
24. P21 027-A • (2 CD) : Mikis Theodorakis • Vol. 20 Theodorakis • Works for piano & orchestra
25. P21 028-A : Grieg • Vol. 18 • Concerto & Piano Works
26. P21 029-A : Live at International Tchaikovsky Competition • Vol. 21 • Moscow 1970
27. P21 030-N : Piano Rarities • Vol. 1 • Transcriptions
28. P21 031-N : The Complete Mozart Piano Concertos • Vol. 6
29. P21 032-N : Album d’un Voyageur • Vol. 1 • EUROPE
30. P21 033-N • (2 CD) : Viennese Connections • Beethoven • Schubert Hüttenbrenner • Diabelli • Liszt
31. P21 034-N : Live in Shanghai • 4 October 2005 • The International Piano Festival of Shanghai Conservatory of Music
32. P21 035-N : Live in Shanghai • 2 October 2007 • The International Piano Festival of Shanghai Conservatory of Music
33. P21 036-A : Cyprien Katsaris Archives • Vol. 16 • Schumann II
34. P21 037-N : Piano Rarities • Vol. 2 • Compositeurs français
35. P21 038-N : Chopin, Concerto n° 2 en fa mineur, op. 21 | les 4 versions
36. P21 039-N : The Complete Mozart Piano Concertos • Vol. 7
37. P21 041-N : Katsaris plays Liszt • Vol. 1
38. P21 042-A : Cyprien Katsaris Archives • Vol. 8 • Schubert
39. P21 043-N : Katsaris plays Chopin • Live Recordings
40. P21 044-N : Hélène Mercier/Cyprien Katsaris • Brahms : Sonata for 2 pianos • Schumann/Clara Schumann : Piano Quintet 4 hands
41. P21 063-N13 : Original Works Used for Mozart's Concertos
