= Play School =

Play School or Playschool may refer to:

== Television ==
- Play School (British TV series), a BBC production aimed at preschool children
- Play School (Australian TV series), an Australian Broadcasting Corporation production based on the British version
- Play School (New Zealand TV series), a New Zealand version based on the BBC original

== Other ==
- Playskool, a toy company
- Pre-school playgroup
- Preschool
