= Kim Goody =

- Born: London, England
- Genres: Alternative rock, electronica, pop
- Occupations: Actress; composer; singer; songwriter
- Years active: 1975–present

Kim Goody is an English actress, composer, singer and songwriter. One of her earliest stints as a singer was providing backing vocals on Dave Davies' 1983 album Chosen People. She has appeared in television shows such as Play Away and No. 73, and featured in the BBC's 1975 Christmas production Great Big Groovy Horse, a rock opera based on the story of the Trojan Horse shown on BBC2 and starring Julie Covington, Bernard Cribbins and Paul Jones. It was later repeated on BBC1 in 1977. She was a regular guest in Jonathan Cohen's 1978 BBC music series Hit the Note. She also appeared as a pop singer named "Michelle" in an episode broadcast on 3 December 1978 called "The Roman Touch" of the television series, "Return of the Saint" starring Ian Ogilvy.

In 1990, Goody competed in A Song for Europe to choose the UK song for the Eurovision Song Contest with the song "Sentimental Again"; she came third. Sandie Shaw later recorded the song. Goody's husband, Alan Coates, a member of The Hollies and Broken English, had won the Song for Europe contest ten years earlier in 1980, going on to finish third at the Eurovision Song Contest as part of the group Prima Donna. With Coates, Goody wrote the music for London Tonight, BBC Radio 5 Live, BBC's Good Morning with Anne and Nick, BBC News 24, Sky News and Sky Sports. As a singer-songwriter, Goody co-wrote the song "In My Car" alongside Ringo Starr.

Alongside her composition and publishing company, Goody set up Soho Square Studios, an audio post-production company, in 2011.

The song "Don't Turn Around", originally recorded by Tina Turner and a hit for both Aswad and Ace of Base in different versions, was also recorded and released by Goody.

Kim Goody also does the voice-over for Bong and Halley on Tiny Planets, a children's television show for ITV, for which she also co-wrote the theme song.
