= Lekestue =

Norwegian children's television programme

Lekestue (English: Playroom) was the name of one of NRK's biggest children's television programmes that was aired from 7 September 1971 until 23 December 1980. The programme was educational, and looked at the world of adults in a way that children could understand. It was based on the BBC program Play School, since the title sequence were very similar to the original British version and New Zealand version, produced for TVNZ.

The best known presenters of Lekestue were Halvdan Sivertsen, Geir Børresen and Vibeke Sæther.
