= David Hargreaves (actor) =

British actor

- Born: New Mills, Derbyshire, England, United Kingdom
- Education: Central School of Speech and Drama
- Occupations: Actor, TV presenter
- Years active: 1962–present
- Spouse: Chloe Ashcroft

David Hargreaves is an English actor who has performed on stage and screen, and in radio drama. He is best known for his television drama roles in the 1970s and 1980s set in the north of England.

== Early life ==
Hargreaves was born in New Mills, Derbyshire, and attended Glossop Grammar School (became Glossopdale School in 1965). He trained as a science teacher, at City of Leeds Training College, and at the Central School of Speech and Drama.

== Career ==
Hargreaves worked as a supply teacher at Rising Hill Comprehensive School in Islington, before joining the Royal Shakespeare Company to play in the first The Wars of the Roses Cycle of plays in 1963/65. He played Hotspur in Henry IV part 1 and Leontes in A Winters Tale for the North East Shakespeare Festival run by Joseph O'Connor in 1965, before joining Olivier's National Theatre, appearing in Much Ado about Nothing, Mother Courage, The Crucible, Royal Hunt of the Sun, Love for Love, Othello, The Storm, A Flea in Her Ear and Rosencrantz and Guildenstern are Dead. After an extensive career in repertory theatre, television and radio, he returned to the RSC in 2004 to play Capulet in Romeo and Juliet in Peter Gill's production, and as Gloucester in Bill Alexander's production of King Lear to Corin Redgrave's Lear.

Returned to the RSC in 2008/09 to play Baptista Minola in The Taming of the Shrew, directed, by Conal Morrison, and as Man in The Cordelia Dream, written by Marina Carr, directed by Selina Cartmell, for the RSC at Wilton's Music Hall. In 2005 he returned to the National Theatre in a co-production with the Royal Exchange Theatre, Manchester, to play Charlie in On the Shore of the Wide World. In 2011 he played God in Tony Harrison's, The Mysteries, directed by Deborah Bruce, and in 2012 played the King of France/Nym/Erpingham, in Dominic Dromgoole's production of Henry V, both at Shakespeare's Globe. 2015 he played Giles Corey in The Crucible, and in 2016, Gloucester in King Lear, both directed by Tom Morris at the Bristol Old Vic. In 2022 he appeared in Moira Buffini's play Manor, at the National Theatre, Lyttleton, directed by Fiona Buffini.

== Personal life ==
He married in 1966 in Buckinghamshire, to actress Chloe Ashcroft, whom he met at the National Theatre.

== Acting credits ==
=== Film ===
Year	Title	Role	Notes
1979	Agatha	Sgt. Jarvis	
1987	Closing Ranks	Doctor	
1989	She's Been Away	Lilian's Doctor	
2003	A Straw in the Wind	Man	Short film
2007	Love Letters	Alan	
2016	Kotchebi	Ted	
2019	Last Christmas	Arthur	
2022	Your Christmas or Mine?	Naughty	
2023	Us & In Between	Eddie	Short film
2025	Rhubarb Rhubarb	Dad	Short film

=== Television ===
Year	Title	Role	Notes
1962	The Last Man Out		6 episodes
1963–1969	Z-Cars	Mechanic, Roy Cooper, Pilot	4 episodes
1965	Othello		Directed by Stuart Burge for BHE Films/National Theatre of Great Britain
1968–1969	The Expert	Sgt. Cook, Harry	3 episodes
1969–1972	Callan	Karl Donner, Harris	2 episodes
1969	The First Lady		Episode: "And They Call That Progress"
1970	Roads to Freedom		2 episodes
1970	The Worker	Mason	
1971–1973	Softly, Softly	Lawrence Morgan, Carter	Episodes: "The Bounty Hunter", "Conspiracy"
1971	Elizabeth R	Bolingbroke	Episode: "Sweet England's Pride"
1972–1980	Play for Today	Various	3 episodes
1972	Clouds of Witness	George Goyles	
1972	The Brothers	Reynolds	Episode: "Full Circle"
1972	The Visitors	Herbert Wragg	Series regular
1972	Home and Away		
1973–1975	Crown Court	Various	3 episodes
1973	The Adventurer	Russel	Episode: "Mr Calloway Is a Very Cautious Man"
1975	The Sweeney	Det. Sgt. Jellineck	Episode: "Night Out"
1975	Centre Play	Caller	Episode: "Post Morton"
1975	Oil Strike North	Henderson	Episode: "Storm Clouds
1976	When the Boat Comes In	Greenberg	Episode: "Roubles for the Promised Land"
1977	This Year Next Year	Randall	Episode: "Haytime"
1977	Headmaster		5 episodes
1977	The XYY Man	Shane Wentworth	2 episodes
1977	The Cost of Loving		
1977	Coronation Street	Mr Birchell	
1978–1979	Play School	Himself	Presenter
1978–1979	Strangers	DCI Rainbow	11 episodes
1978	Armchair Thriller	Ken Holbrook	Parts 3, 5 and 6 of "A Dog's Ransom"
1978	The Standard		Episode: "Two Birds one Stone"
1978	The Professionals	Halloran	Episode: "Not a Very Civil Servant"
1979	A Brother's Tale		
1980	Leap in the Dark	Dr Bushnell	Episode: "Poor Jenny"
1980	Cribb	Robert D'Estin	Episode: "The Detective Wore Silk Drawers"
1980	Mistress Masham's Repose		
1980	Together		
1981–1982	Juliet Bravo	Tom Darblay	22 episodes
1981–1982	Sorry I'm a Stranger Here Myself	Tom Pratt	Series regular
1981–1982	Science Workshop	Himself	Presenter
1981	Jackanory	Himself	Presenter
1982	For Ever Young	Brother-in-law	
1982	Minder	Archie Simpson	"Back in Good Old England"
1983	Shades of Darkness	Fanshaw	Episode: "The Intercessor"- Fanshaw
1984	The Sea Green Man		
1985–1986	Albion Market	Derek Owen	80 episodes
1985	Home to Roost		
1985	Shine on Harvey Moon	Sgt. Singer	Episode: "Anything Goes"
1985	Pie in the Sky	Himself	Presenter
1986	1914 All Out	Tom Houghton	TV movie
1987	Truckers		Episode: "Shoot if you'll pardon my French"
1988–1989	Making Out	Colin	Recurring
1988	Erasmus Microman	Michael Faraday	
1988	ScreenPlay	Governor	Episode: "No Further Cause for Concern"
1989	All Creatures Great and Small		Episodes: "Mending Fences"
1989	TECX	Editor	
1990	Agatha Christie's Poirot	Sergeant	
1990	4 Play	Desk Sergeant	Episode: "Madly in Love"
1990	A Strike Out of Time	Arthur Scargill	TV movie
1990	Debut on Two	Blue Man, Wayne	Episodes: "The Conversion of St Paul", "Kingdom Come"
1991	Thatcher: The Final Days	Charles Powell	TV movie
1991	Woof!	Doctor	
1991	Josie	Gradgrind	
1992–2005	Heartbeat	Various	3 episodes
1992	The Mendip Mysteries	Lou Clarke	
1992	The Tempest	Alonso	For BBC Disability Unit
1993–1998	Peak Practice	Rev. Neil Winters, Charlie Fields	2 episodes
1993–2006	The Bill	Various	5 episodes
1993	The Inspector Alleyn Mysteries	Super.Int. Harper	Episode: "Death at the Bar"
1993	Fighting for Gemma	Dr Phillip Dale	TV movie
1993	Harry	MadAxeman	
1994–2006	Casualty	Various	3 episodes
1994	The Ruth Rendell Mysteries	Mr Feast	Episode: "Vanity Dies Hard"
1994	Earthfast	Dr Wix	
1995	Some Kind of Life	John Taylor	
1995	Expert Witness	Det. Sup. David Doxey	Episode: "A Family Man"
1996	Hetty Wainthropp Investigates	Picture Editor	Episode: "Eye Witness"
1996	Beck	O'Rielly	
1996	Pie in the Sky	Charlie Reeves	Episodes: "Return Match"
1997	Blooming Marvellous	Dad	6 episodes
1997	Bugs	Anthony Fairchild	Episodes: "Identity Crisis", "Happy Ever After"
1998	West Foot Forward		Producer and deviser; eight-part documentary
1999	The Passion	Dave	Series regular
2001–2003	Merseybeat	Bill Gentle	Series regular
2014	Borgia	Fra Cello	
2015	Last Chance	Roger	Gained special selection for LA Shorts Fest
2017	Trust Me	Geoff	
2018–2019	This Country	Arthur Andrews	Series regular
2018	Doctors	Edwin Wolfe	
2018	Moving On	Andrew	
2018	Fleabag	Chatty Joe	Series 2
2018	Traitors	Martin Garrick	Recurring
2019	Warren	Grandad	Series regular
2019	For Love or Money	Priest	
2019	Wild Bill	Albert Gilchrist	
2019	Flack	Warren Armitage	Series 2
2021	A Very British Scandal	Niall	
2022	The Flatshare	Mr Prior	Series regular
2022	Documentary Now	Horace McTierney	Season 4
2022	Dalgliesh	Mr Lorrimer	Series 2
2024	Whitstable Pearl	Jacob Carnage	
2024	Silent Witness	Benjamin Dawson	
2025	Young Sherlock	Coroner	
2025	The Famous Five	Grandfather	
2026	Make That Movie	Winnie	
2026	Ann Droid	Tom	

=== Theatre ===
Year	Title	Role	Director	Theatre	Notes
1963–1964	Richard III	Norfolk	Peter Hall/John Barton	Royal Shakespeare Theatre	Royal Shakespeare Company
1963–1964	Henry VI	Assorted Soldiers, Citizens	Peter Hall/John Barton/Peter Wood	Royal Shakespeare Theatre	Royal Shakespeare Company
1963–1965	Three Sisters	Solyony	Frank Evans	Conference Hall Studio	Royal Shakespeare Company
1963	The Lower Middle-Class Wedding Party	Bridegroom	Sandy Black	Royal Shakespeare Theatre	Royal Shakespeare Company
1964	Richard II	Bushy	Peter Hall/John Barton	Royal Shakespeare Theatre	Royal Shakespeare Company
1965–1967	Mother Courage and Her Children	Catholic Sergeant/ Lieutenant	Bill Gaskill	Royal National Theatre	Old Vic
1965	Othello	Herald	John Dexter		
1965	The Storm	Citizen	John Dexter		
1965	Much Ado about Nothing	Borachio	Franco Zeffirelli/Robert Stephens		
1965	Love for Love	Foresight's Servant	Peter Wood		
1965	Juno and the Paycock	Neighbour	Laurence Olivier		
1965	A Flea in Her Ear	Neighbour	Jacques Charon		
1965	Rosencrantz and Guildenstern Are Dead	Horatio	Derek Goldby		
1965	Henry VI, Part 1	Hotspur	Tony Carrick	Sunderland Empire Theatre	Part of the North East Shakespeare Festival
1965	The Winters Tale	Leontes	Joseph O'Connor	Sunderland Empire Theatre	Part of the North East Shakespeare Festival
1968	Not Now, Darling	Ron	Patrick Cargill	Strand Theatre	For Michael White
1969	Saint Joan	Cauchon	George Roman	Billingham Forum Theatre	
1970	The Roaring Girl	Trapdoor	Keith Darville	Dundee Repertory Theatre	
1970	The Recruiting Officer	Plume	Tony Carrick	Hornchurch Repertory Theatre	
1971	Subject for Interrogation/Agentic Shift	Colonel/Joe	John Chapman	Bush Theatre	
1972	Landscape of Exile	Aveling	Roland Rees	Half Moon Theatre	For Foco Novo
1979	Wednesday	Arthur	Dusty Hughes	Bush Theatre	
1980	It's a Mad House	Eddie	Michael Attenborough	Leeds Playhouse	
1982	The Best Girl in Ten Streets	Interrogator	Tamara Hinchco	Soho Poly	
1982	Devour the Snow	Sutter	Simon Curtis	Bush Theatre	
1983	A Passion in Six Days	Glint	Michael Boyd	Crucible Theatre	
1984	A View from the Bridge	Alfieri	Roger Smith	Young Vic Theatre	
1987	Happy Jack	Jack	Janet Henfry		Islington Touring
1988	The Father	The Captain	Patrick Stanford	Redgrave Theatre	
1988	A Doll's House	Krogstadt	Jan Sargeant	Riverside Studios	
1989	Chekhov's Women	Ivan/Vershinin	Vanessa Redgrave/David Hargreaves	Lyric Theatre, Hammersmith	For Moving Theatre Company
1989	Stoppard's 15 Minute Hamlet		David Hargreaves	The Rose	For "Save the Rose Theatre"
1990	Is This the Day	Derek Humphries	Michael Napier Brown	Royal Theatre, Northampton	
1991	Twelfth Night	Antonio	Peter Hall	Triumph Productions Playhouse Theatre	London/Tour
1992	A View from the Bridge	Eddie Carbone	Michael Napier Brown	Royal Theatre, Northampton	
1993	Raising Hell	Aleister Crowley	Les Miller	Old Red Lion	For Inner City Theatre
1993	A Passionate Woman	Donald	David Liddament	West Yorkshire Playhouse	
1995	Antony and Cleopatra	Lepidus/Dolabella	Vanessa Redgrave	Riverside Studios	For Moving Theatre Company; went on world tour
1995	The Fire Raisers	Chorus	Lenka Udovički	Riverside Studios	For Moving Theatre Company
1995	Casement	Basil Thompson	Corin Redgrave	Riverside Studios	For Moving Theatre Company
1996	The Changing Room	Thornton	James Macdonald	Duke of York's Theatre	For Royal Court Theatre; toured
1996	Season's Greetings	Harvey	Gwenda Hughes	Birmingham Repertory Theatre	
1997	Lavochkin 5	Seryozha	Irina Brown	Tron Theatre	
1998	Kafka's Dick	Herman	Phillip Franks	Nottingham Playhouse	
1999	All That Trouble That We Had	Vaughan	Tony Clarke	Birmingham Repertory Theatre	
1999	The Four Alice Bakers	Prof. Richard Baker	Bill Alexander	Birmingham Repertory Theatre	
2000–2001	Hamlet	Polonius	Bill Alexander	Birmingham Repertory Theatre	Toured
2000	Quarantine	Aphas	Bill Alexander	Birmingham Repertory Theatre	
2000	Twelfth Night	Feste	Bill Alexander	Birmingham Repertory Theatre	
2004–2005	King Lear	Gloucester	Bill Alexander	Albery Theatre	For Royal Shakespeare Company Stratford/London
2004	Romeo and Juliet	Capulet	Peter Gill	Albery Theatre	For Royal Shakespeare Company Stratford/London
2004	Pilate	Caiaphas	Michael Boyd		For RSC Studio, Stratford
2005	On the Shore of the Wide World	Charlie Holmes	Sarah Francom	Royal Exchange, Manchester	Royal National Theatre
2005	The Hypochondriac	Argente	Hamish Glenn	Belgrade Theatre	
2006	The Worcester Pilgrim	Pilgrim	Peter Leslie Wilde	Worcester Cathedral	
2007	Mr Puntila and His Man Matti	Puntila	Hamish Glenn	Belgrade Theatre	
2008–2009	The Cordelia Dream	Man	Selina Cartmel	Wilton's Music Hall	Royal Shakespeare Company
2008	The Taming of the Shrew	Baptista Minola	Conal Morrison	Royal Shakespeare Theatre	Royal Shakespeare Company
2009	Pub Quiz is Life	Bunny	Gareth Tudor Price	Hull Truck Theatre	Hull Truck Theatre Company
2010	Inheritance	Harry	Lisa Goldman		Live Theatre Company
2011	The Globe Mysteries by Tony Harrison	God	Deborah Bruce	Shakespeare's Globe	
2014	Henry V	King of France/Nym/Erpingham	Dominic Dromgoole	Shakespeare's Globe	
2016	The Crucible	Giles Corey	Tom Morris	Bristol Old Vic	
2016	King Lear	Gloucester	Tom Morris	Bristol Old Vic	
2022	Manor	Rev.Fiske	Fiona Buffini	Royal National Theatre	

=== Radio ===
Year	Title	Role	Producer	Channel	Notes
2001	The Tailor of Gloucester	The Tailor	Jonquil Ponting	BBC Radio 4	
2001	The Rainbow Bridge	David Williams	Peter Leslie Wilde	BBC Radio 4	
2002	Scrooge Blues	Ebenezer Scrooge	Peter Leslie Wilde	BBC Radio 4	
2002	Glorious John	John	Peter Leslie Wilde	BBC Radio 4	
2002	The Really Rough Holiday Guide	Old Tom	Sally Avens	BBC Radio 4	
2003	The Worcester Pilgrim	William Sutton	Vanessa Whitburn/Peter Leslie Wilde	BBC Radio 4	
2004	The English Garden	Poetry Reader	Gabi Fisher	BBC Radio 4	
2005	Gunpowder Women	Father Garnet		BBC Radio 4	
2005	Portrait	Phil	David Hunter	BBC Radio 4	
2005	The Waterloo Model	Narrator	Peter Leslie Wilde	BBC Radio 4	
2006	Alf Said I Was Great	Len	Peter Leslie Wilde	BBC Radio 4	
2006	Out of Season	George	Carrie Rooney	BBC Radio 4	
2006	GBA were M'esin	The Man	Polly James	BBC Radio 4	
2006	Good Times Roll	Guy	Steven Canny	BBC Radio 3	
2006	Tin Man	Grandad/Tinker	Nadia Molinari	BBC Radio 4	
2006	Heft Like the Herdwick	Thomas	Nadia Molinari	BBC Radio 4	
2007	Second Chance	Jim	Nadia Molinari	BBC Radio 4	
2008	Look Sharp	Ted	Nadia Molinari	BBC Radio 4	
2009	Boswell's Life of Johnson	David Garrick/King George	Claire Groves	BBC Radio 4	
2009	Choice of Straws	Dad	Claire Groves	BBC Radio 4	
2009	Edward II	Lancaster/Matrevis	Jessica Dromgoole	BBC Radio 4	
2009	From Fact to Fiction: Parliament of Rooks	Poet	Peter Leslie Wilde	BBC Radio 4	
2009	How are you Feeling Alf	Michael	Peter Kavanagh	BBC Radio 4	
2009	Incident at Boulonvilliers	Arthur	David Hunter	BBC Radio 4	
2009	Leaving	Oswald Knobloch	Marion Nancarrow	BBC Radio 4	
2009	Rappaccini's Daughter	Baglioni	Abigal le Fleming	BBC Radio 4	
2009	The Hairy Ape	Guard	Toby Swift	BBC Radio 4	
2009	The Milk Race	Fox Man	Toby Swift	BBC Radio 4	
2009	The Last Tsar	Lord Stanfordham	Jeremy Mortimer	BBC Radio 4	
2009	The Long Room	Reader	Laurence Grissel	BBC Radio 4	
2009	The Looking Glass War	Woodford	Marc Beeby	BBC Radio 4	
2009	Tinker Tailor Soldier Spy	Roy Bland	Steven Canny	BBC Radio 4	
2009	Towards Zero	Treeves	Mary Peate	BBC Radio 4	
2010	The Ladies Delight	Narrator	Charlotte Riches	BBC Radio 4	Woman's Hour serial
2010	The Archers	Joseph Hastings	Vanessa Whitburn	BBC Radio 4	
2010	Siege	Jack	Susan Roberts	BBC Radio 4	
2010	The Journey	Alan	Nadia Molinari	BBC Radio 4	
2012	The Archers	Arthur	Julie Beckett	BBC Radio 4	
2012	Together	Reader	Andrew Barnes	BBC Radio 4	
2012	Truman and Riley	Charlie	Toby Swift	BBC Radio 4	
2019	The Archers	Alf Grundy		BBC Radio 4	
2020	The Tempest	Prospero	Sean Hagarty	Shakespeare@ Home	
2021	Richard II	John of Gaunt	Sean Hagarty	Shakespeare@ Home	
