= Carol Chell =

British TV presenter

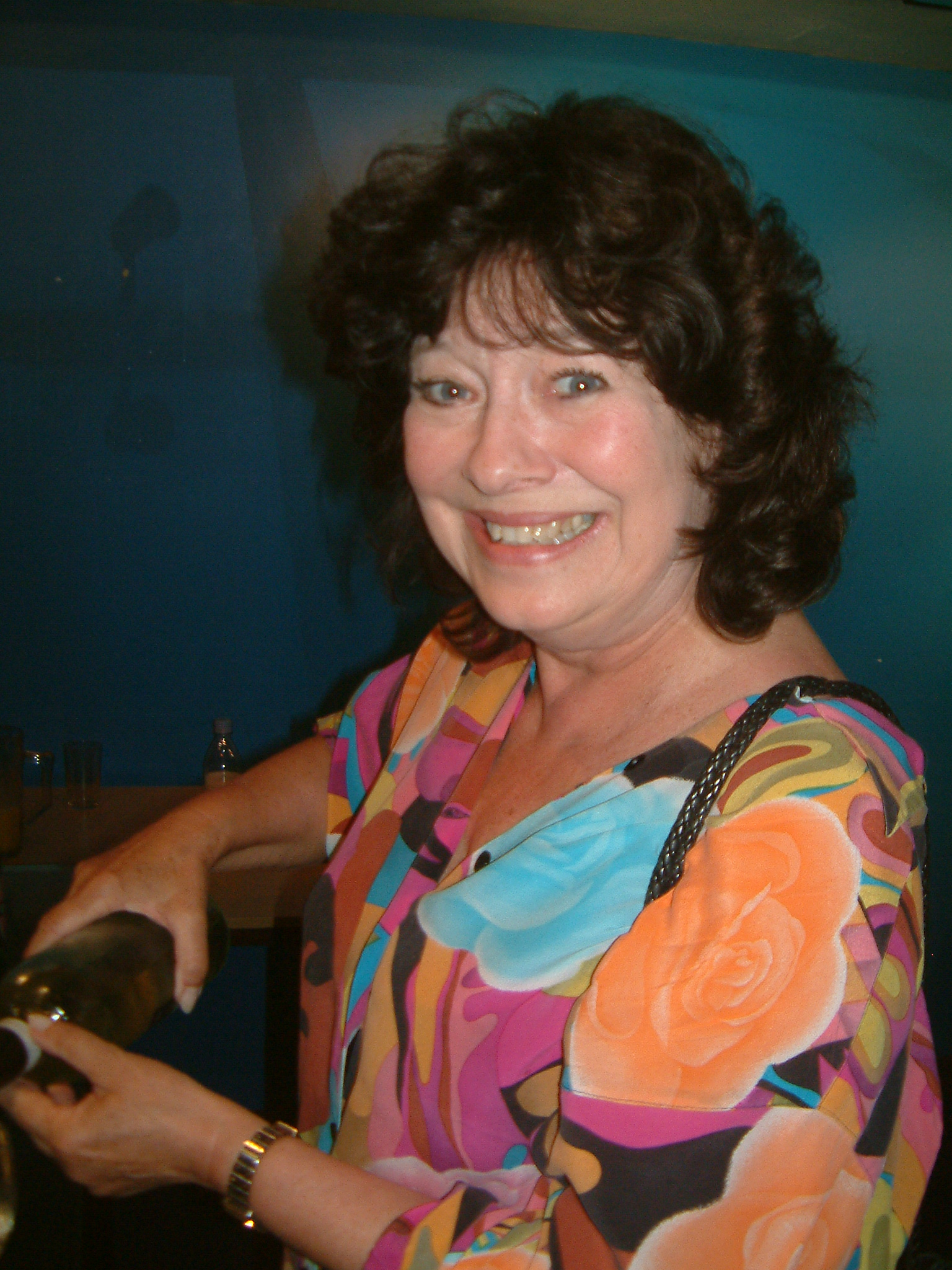
- Chell in 2004
- Born: Carol Julia Chell; 1941 (age 84–85)
- Occupations: Television presenter, television executive, former teacher
- Known for: Hostess of Play School (1966-1988) and Play Away (1971-1980)

Carol Julia Chell (born July 1941) is a British children's television presenter and TV executive. She originally qualified as a teacher, and produced many educational TV shows in the 1960s. She is best known for her work as a long-serving presenter from 1966 to 1988 on Play School and from 1971 to 1980 on Play Away.

== Early life ==
Chell attended Nottingham Girls' High School, then a direct grant grammar school, and lived on Tudor Road in West Bridgford. She attended the Royal Central School of Speech and Drama.

== Career ==
=== Teacher ===
For a time she taught at Pierrepont Secondary Modern School for Girls, in Nottingham; also teaching there at the time was Brian Clark, who would become a television writer, writing Telford's Change.

=== Television ===
Chell appeared as herself as part of a group of 'time-travellers' trying to solve puzzles on the planet Arg in episode 1 of series 2 of BBC TV quiz series The Adventure Game on 2 November 1981 (available on the DVD release of the series from Simplymedia). She took part in the ATV schools series Starting Out in 1982. She later worked for satellite TV station The Children's Channel, where she was head of pre-school programming until the channel's demise in 1998.

Chell appeared alongside Johnny Ball on a celebrity edition of Pointless, featuring stars of children's television. This aired on 20 September 2014 on BBC One.

== Personal life ==
She married Ian Price (of 'Westfield' on Rempstone Hill, in Costock) on Saturday 9 October 1965 at St Peter's Church in Tollerton, Nottinghamshire, when aged 23. She lived in Blackheath, London.

At the time, her parents lived in Christchurch, Dorset. Chell and Price have two daughters, Emily & Sophie, and six grandchildren.
