= The Pioneer Pog 'n' Scroggin Bush Band =

The Pioneer Pog'n'Scroggin Bush Band (often known simply as "The Pogs") was a bush band based in Dunedin, New Zealand. The band was one of the longest-surviving folk bands in New Zealand, being formed in 1980 and surviving until 2004. Some 40 people can claim to have been members of the band at one stage or another, though its usual line-up consisted of five to seven members. Notable former "Pogs" include Mike Moroney, Lindsey Shields, John Dodd, and Bruce Cull. Moroney has since gone on to form The Chaps with fellow Dunedin folk musicians Marcus Turner, John Dodd and Hyram Ballard.

The Pioneer Pog 'n' Scroggin Bush Band composed many of their own compositions, and also performed and recorded traditional songs and originals by other musicians. The Pog's version of one of the latter – "Southern man", written by Murray Grindley – became the anthem for the Otago Rugby team.

== Recordings ==
- Playing for pennies (1984)
- Pogonorythms (1985)
- Love of the land (1993)
- Sesqui (1998)
