= Chloe Ashcroft =

British television presenter

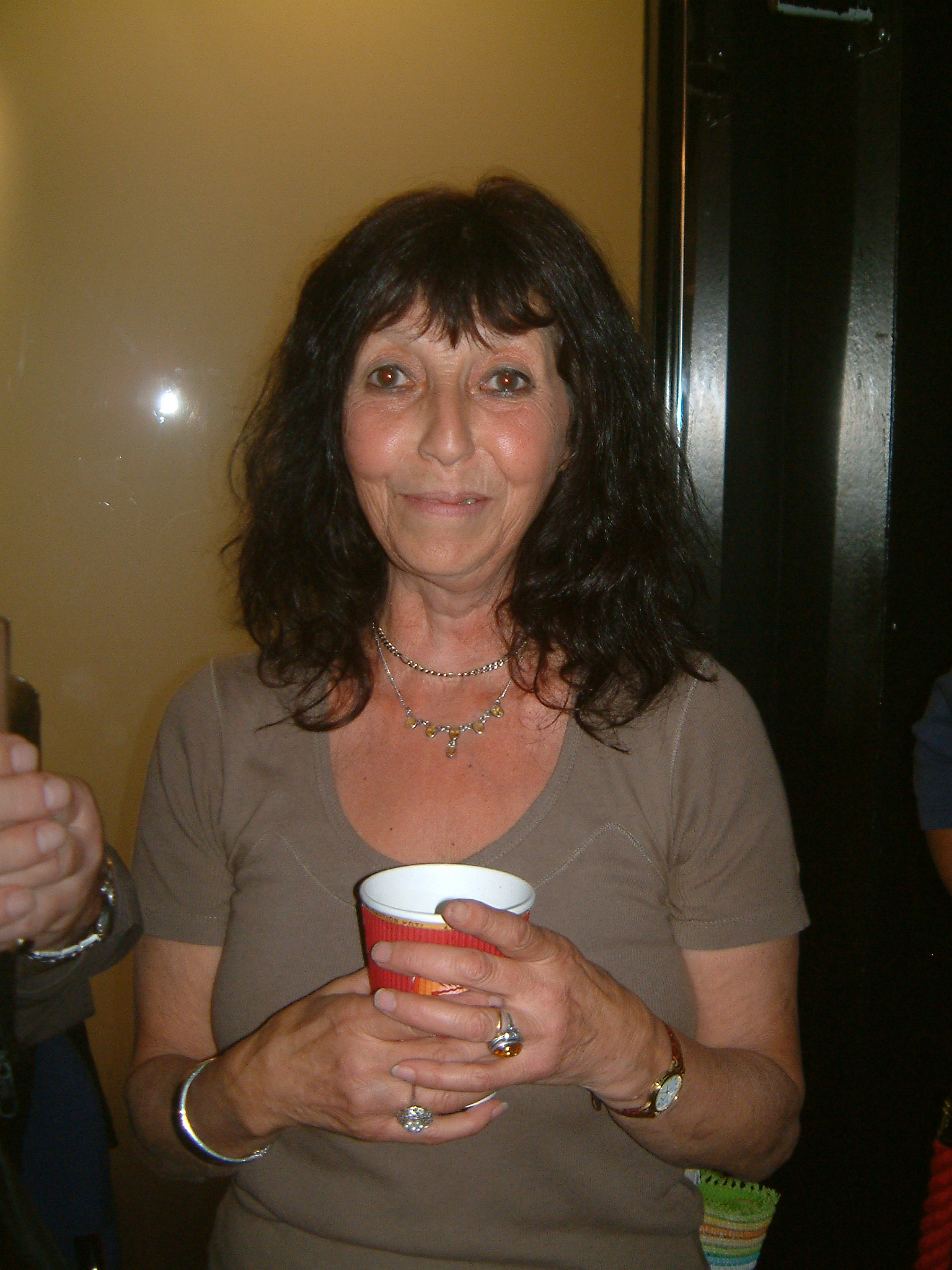
- Ashcroft in 2004
- Born: 7 July 1942 (age 83)
- Occupation(s): Actress and former children's TV presenter
- Spouse: David Hargreaves

Chloe Ashcroft (born 7 July 1942) is a British actress and a former presenter of several BBC children's TV programmes, including Play School, Play Away, Hokey-Cokey, Excuse Me, All Change, and Pie in the Sky. She also appeared in the Doctor Who story Resurrection of the Daleks (1984), playing Professor Laird.

Before her television career, she appeared in several stage plays in the 1960s, and returned to the stage in the 1980s. Outside of acting, she has worked as a teacher. She now lives in Whiteshill and Ruscombe in Gloucestershire with her husband, the actor David Hargreaves, with whom she has two children.
