= Marcus Turner =

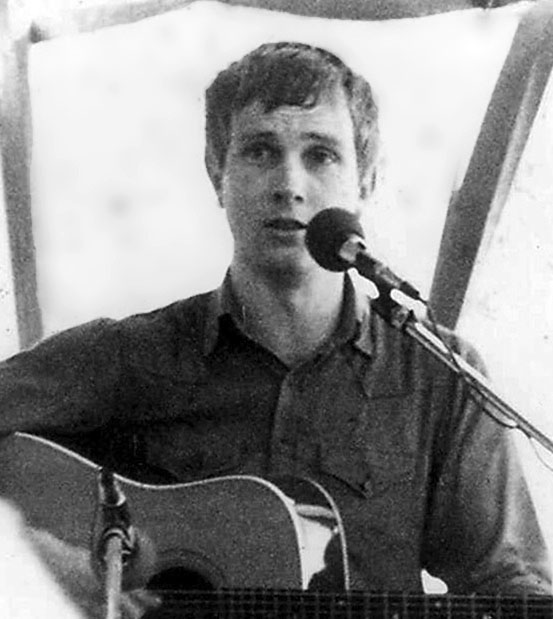
- Turner performing in Amberley in 1983

Background information
- Born: Marcus William Turner; 16 February 1956; Roxburgh, New Zealand
- Died: 2 February 2016 (aged 59) Otago Peninsula, New Zealand
- Occupations: Musician, singer-songwriter
- Years active: 1973–2016
- Website: Turner's webpage

Marcus William Turner (16 February 1956 – 2 February 2016) was a New Zealand singer-songwriter and folk musician. He performed at folk festivals in New Zealand, Australia, and overseas. He was also a presenter in the TVNZ children's television programmes Spot On, How's That and Play School (in the latter of which he was also a director).

Turner lived on the Otago Peninsula, near Dunedin, New Zealand. He died in early February 2016.

== Early life ==
Turner was born in Roxburgh, the eldest of three children (the others being a brother, Linus, and a sister, Marcella), and grew up in the small seaside settlement of Karitane. His father worked as a psychiatric nurse, his mother in many roles, including general nurse at the nearby Cherry Farm Hospital. Marcus was schooled at East Otago High School in Palmerston, before going to Dunedin's University of Otago, where he majored in zoology, graduating with honours in 1978.

== Television career ==
Turner joined Television New Zealand (TVNZ), working as a children's television presenter. He became widely known as a presenter of popular programme Spot On, alongside Ian Taylor and Helen McGowan. He also trained to become a television director. He continued to work in television, moving behind the camera to become producer of children's show Play School and writer and producer of children's natural history series Wildtrack. During his time with TVNZ he met production assistant Anne Hewton, who was to become his wife.

The Turners spent a year and a half in the United Kingdom. On returning from the United Kingdom, Marcus resumed his television career, eventually moving to NHNZ to work as a researcher, director and producer, and narrator of nature documentaries. He was still working for NHNZ at the time of his death.

== Music career ==
Turner began performing at Dunedin's Otago University Folk Music Club in 1973. Initially, his music consisted of covers of music by singers such as Paul Simon and John Denver, but gradually expanded to include traditional folk. Turner was, during the 1970s, a member of several folk groups, notably the High Country Bluegrass. A gifted multi-instrumentalist, he was at home playing guitar, banjo, mandolin, or any of the more unusual folk instruments he collected from around the world.

Turner began to write his own songs, and had early success with the comedic "The Civil Service Song", released by EMI as a single in the late 1970s. His first album, The Best is Yet to Come was released by CityFolk in 1983. He proved to be a versatile writer, able to turn his hand to both wryly tongue-in-cheek comedy songs and more introspective serious numbers. During his time in the United Kingdom, Turner devoted much of his time to music and performance, but found the British folk scene disheartening and unpalatable.

After his return to New Zealand, Turner became a founder member of folk group The Chaps, alongside fellow Dunedin folk musicians Mike Moroney (formerly of The Pioneer Pog 'n' Scroggin Bush Band), Hyram Ballard and John Dodd. The Chaps have recorded three albums and also toured Europe twice.

In 2005, Turner released his second solo album Laid Down. His musical interests included traditional music from many countries, and he played a wide variety of traditional musical instruments with Footspa, a band comprising musicians from other groups located in the Dunedin area.

Turner was a founder of Dunedin's New Edinburgh Folk Club, and (with Moroney) set up and maintained kiwifolk.org.nz, a folk music discussion forum and directory.

Some of his compositions have been recorded by performers such as Irish singer Andy Irvine, the Danish folk group Færd and the British singing group Hen Party. Turner also composed for films, including the NHNZ documentary Hotel Iguana.

Following Marcus' passing, friend and fellow musician Martin Curtis released an album of Marcus performing live at the Cardrona Folk Festival in 2014, capturing Marcus at his absolute best.

== Personal life ==
After returning from the United Kingdom, Marcus and Anne moved to Macandrew Bay, on the Otago Peninsula, ten minutes drive from Dunedin. They had two children, Cushla and Maura. Anne died after a long illness in 2014.

== Death ==
Marcus Turner died suddenly at his home on 2 February 2016 at the age of 59.

== Discography ==
Solo

- The Best Is Yet To Come (1983)
- Laid Down (2005)
- Marcus Turner at Cardrona (2014)

With 'The Chaps'

- In The Club (1993)
- Hiphoppalong (2003)
- Don't Worry 'Bout Your Age (2011)

By other artists

- Way Out Yonder, by Andy Irvine (2000) – features Turner's "When The Boys Are On Parade"
- Heart Gallery, by Hen Party (2005) – features Turner's "Chocolate Song"
- Michael Black, by Michael Black (2007) – features Turner's "When The Boys Are On Parade"

== See also ==
- List of folk musicians
