= Tiny Planets =

2001 animated children's television series

- Genre: Children's animation
- Created by: Nina Elias-Bamberger
- Directed by: Alastair McIlwain
- Creative director: David J. Aldred
- Voices of: Dashiell Tate; Kim Goody
- Opening theme: Bing and Bong by Kim Goody
- Ending theme: Bing and Bong by Kim Goody
- Composers: Kim Goody; Alan Coates
- Countries of origin: United Kingdom; United States
- Original languages: English; Grammelot
- No. of series: 5
- No. of episodes: 65

Production
- Executive producers: Paul J. Michael; Nina Elias-Bamberger
- Producer: Richard Morss
- Editor: Samantha Hatton-Brown
- Running time: 5 minutes
- Production companies: Sesame Workshop; Pepper's Ghost Productions Ltd

Original release
- Network: CITV (UK); Noggin (USA)
- Release: 10 June 2001 – 20 July 2005

Tiny Planets is an animated children's television series produced by Sesame Workshop and Pepper's Ghost Productions. The concept was designed and developed by Ed Taylor. The series consists of 65 five-minute, dialogue-free episodes featuring two polar extraterrestrials travelling their universe and solving a specific problem each episode.

== Plot ==
Deep in the heart of the Tiny Universe lies the Home Planet, where the main characters, two aliens named Bing and Bong, make their home. These two explorers are catapulted to the surrounding worlds in their planetary system on a flying white couch where they explore, learn about the inhabitants, develop friendships and have fun.

== Characters ==
- Bing (voiced by Dashiell Tate) – The older and larger alien, his enormous appetite for exploring is dwarfed only by the endless supply of useful gadgets in an ever-present pouch. Wise and determined, he often takes the lead in adventures. Patient and thoughtful, he loves nothing more than a problem to be solved or a job to be done. He likes to help others and has an optimistic approach to life and its problems. He does not speak, but communicates with body language, expressive eyebrows, and humming sounds.
- Bong (voiced by Kim Goody, the singer of the theme song) – The younger and smaller alien who is Bing's appealing, coy and impulsive best friend. Impish, playful, gregarious and incredibly compassionate, he is especially miserable when on bad terms with Bing. He loves to join in games and be the centre of attention. He does not speak but has an expressive face and a body, a high-pitched sound (which is cross between a grunt and a squeak), and a multi-decibel cried of joy.
- Halley (also voiced by Kim Goody, the singer of the theme song) – A small wide-eyed insect bug who is named after the comet who provides a running commentary from her flying saucer and "films" the action with a remote camera to provide a summary at the end of the episode.
- Flockers – Creatures that live on each of the Tiny Planets, each with its own distinctive population. More often than not, it is these social creatures that Bing & Bong are helping out of a jam. Whether it is cleaning out-of-reach windows or fortifying a house to withstand wind, Flockers are a perpetual source of problems begging to be solved. They do not speak, but communicate with body language and call sounds. Their design varies depending on the planet; they have either one or two heads and either one or two legs. Only a few have arms.
- Locals – Smaller inhabitants of the planets that can appear in greater numbers than the Flockers but are just as dim. They are mostly globular in shape with blinking eyes and little antennae on top of their heads. They do not speak, but they communicate by bouncing, blinking and squeaking. On certain planets, the Locals are geometric shapes – squares, circles and triangles. Locals are always colourful, appealing and friendly.
- Robots – Segmented spherical creatures with mechanical arms and either wheels or helicopter rotors. Found mostly on the Tiny Planet of Technology, like all robots, they are linear thinkers attempting to multitask. They are there to help but do not always take instructions well. Thus, they are a challenge and Bing and Bong learn to work with them to get the best out of them.

== Settings ==
There are six Tiny Planets that Bing and Bong travel to, in addition to their home planet.

- Home Planet – Bing and Bong live on the Home Planet. From here, they set out every morning on a new adventure. It is an icy world, covered in snow-capped ice floes. Inside a giant crystal is Bing and Bong's home, decorated in a steampunk fashion, with much brass work. The main and most notable feature is the fuzzy white couch that doubles as both their bed and their means of intergalactic travel. Tethered to the Home Planet by a bungee cord it is launched into space by a monstrous catapult.
- Tiny Planet of Nature – Bing and Bong discover weather, plants and animals, the power of wind and the way rain turns to snow. This is a verdant and lush world, with trees, lakes, mountains, forests and flowers. The seasons there are much like a temperate part of the world, with snow in winter, hot sun in summer and falling leaves in autumn.
- Tiny Planet of Technology – Bing and Bong design gadgets to discover the properties of springs, wheels, levers, pulleys, balance, forces, gears and structures. The planet consists of a massive detailed brass sphere, with four tethered satellites: two cubes and two spheres. The action takes place inside this planet, with an emphasis on structures and principles of physics.
- Tiny Planet of Self – Bing and Bong encounter fitness, cleanliness and healthy eating and learn more about themselves and others. This is a loose cluster of outcrops floating in a sunny atmosphere, linked by rows of stepping-stones. There are pagoda-like pavilions and a sports arena here, and local transport is by sky-boat. Lessons of health, feelings, and good manners are learned here.
- Tiny Planet of Sound – Bing and Bong join musical bands, play tubas, beat on drums and experiment with rhythm, harmony, pitch and acoustics. This is a rocky desert planet, with odd flora such as Pitch-Plants (extendible flutes that can be blown), maraca leaves and self-playing tom-tom trees. Flockers and Locals often hold concerts here. The planet is blue from orbit, and is surrounded by a swarm of small asteroids which spiral from pole to pole.
- Tiny Planet of Light and Colour – Bing and Bong discover rainbows, shadows, animation and colour mixing. This is an environment where Bing and Bong discover optical phenomena. Around the planet, there is a wide, circular, semi-transparent band inlaid with parallel strips of ever-changing colours. The landscape is similar to a desert, and the most notable features are the bullet-shaped rock pillars with paint coloured spots on them.
- Tiny Planet of Stuff – Bing and Bong explore groups of things and what they're made of. They play with patterns and numbers and sort things by colour, shape and sound. The planet is shaped like a gigantic Möbius strip and patterned like pink-and-blue graph paper; hence, this is where Bing and Bong solve problems involving arithmetic, logic and geometry.

== Episodes ==
Nature:
- Seasons Machine
- Snow Problem
- Gone With the Wind
- It's Raining Bongs
- Winter Warm-Ups
- On the Right Track
- Blown Away
- Egg-stra Large
- Body Talk
- Big and Small

Technology:

- Tip the Scales
- Spring Cleaning
- Tools, Glorious Tools
- Free Wheeling
- Slippery Slope
- Pedal Meddle
- Pivotal Points
- The Right Angle
- The Fisher Bing
- Strength in Girders

Self:

- Tuba Trouble
- Night Light, Sleep Tight
- Shower Plan
- That's What Friends are For
- Flockercise
- Sweet Temptations
- Odd Bing Out
- Box of Tricks
- Keep Your Head
- Easy Rider
- Moving and Grooving
- Birthday Build-Up
- Be a Sport
- Love is All You Need
- Pooling Resources
- Everyone's a Winner

Sound:

- Highs and Lows
- Flower Power
- Jammin' Session
- A Chorus Line
- Desperately Seeking Silence
- Hear My Song
- Bing Bong Bell
- Found Sounds Orchestra
- Rhythm and Moods

Light and Colour:

- Shadow Showtime
- True Colours
- Making Rainbows
- Flocker Flicker
- Contrasting Views
- The Light Fantastic
- 3D or Not 3D?

Stuff:

- Patterns on Parade
- Picnic Poser
- Suits You
- Give Me Five
- Shapes Alive
- Magnificent Seven
- Shapes and Ladders
- Mirror Magic
- A Place for Everything
- Road Block
- What's Cooking?
- Colour Clues
- Ramping Up

== Broadcast ==
Tiny Planets was screened on ITV in the United Kingdom from 10 June 2001 to 20 July 2005.

In the United States, it was broadcast from April 1, 2002, to April 9, 2006, on Noggin, originally in 5-minute segments and later in half-hour compilations.

It also aired in several other countries around the world, including ABC in Australia, K-T.V. World in South Africa, BFBS in Germany as well as Belize, the Falkland Islands, Gibraltar and Bosnia and Herzegovina, TV3 in New Zealand, Kids Central in Singapore, JimJam in Malta and Poland, e-Junior in the Emirates, TVB Pearl in Hong Kong and Macau, and Family Channel and CBC in Canada. Localised versions were aired on Super RTL in Germany, NRK in Norway, HRT in Croatia, NHK in Japan, UBC Kids in Thailand, SBS in South Korea, Astro Ria in Malaysia, Spacetoon in Indonesia, Italia 1 in Italy, Discovery Kids in Latin America, Televisa in Mexico and Minika Çocuk in Turkey.

== Awards and nominations ==
The programme was nominated for several BAFTA awards. It won the 2002 BAFTA Interactive Children's Entertainment Award and was nominated for the 2001 BAFTA Interactive Award for Online Learning and the 2003 BAFTA Pre-school Animation Award. Additionally, a website based on the series was awarded the 2001 BAFTA Interactive Entertainment Website Award.
