= Music Time (TV programme) =

British children's educational TV series (1970–1991)

- Genre: Educational
- Presented by: Mari Griffith (1970–72); Ian Humphris (1970–72); Kathryn Harries (1977–81); Peter Combe (1977–80); Andrew C. Wandsworth (1981); Jonathan Cohen (1983–91); Helen Speirs (1983–91)
- Country of origin: United Kingdom
- Original language: English
- No. of series: 24
- No. of episodes: 224

Production
- Running time: 20 minutes

Original release
- Network: BBC1 (1970–81); BBC2 (1983–91)
- Release: 23 September 1970 – 18 March 1991

Music Time is a British educational television program as part of the BBC Schools strand from 23 September 1970 to 18 March 1991. The program is aimed at primary school children aged between 7 and 9. It teaches singing, instrumentation, and basic elements of music theory and performance through simple, easily understandable songs. These often form part of a production intended to be performed by schools, and usually performed at either the start or end of the term. There would often be a pantomime in the autumn term. The program also includes animated films (usually produced by Bura and Hardwick) based on classical works.

Sheet music for the episodes was also produced and sold by the BBC.

== Episodes ==
=== Peter and the Wolf (1970) ===
No. overall	No. in series	Title	Original release date
1	1	"Program 1"	23 September 1970
2	2	"Program 2"	30 September 1970
3	3	"Program 3"	7 October 1970
4	4	"Program 4"	14 October 1970
5	5	"Program 5"	21 October 1970
6	6	"Program 6"	4 November 1970
7	7	"Program 7"	11 November 1970
8	8	"Program 8"	18 November 1970
9	9	"Peter and the Wolf"	25 November 1970
10	10	"End-of-Term Concert"	2 December 1970

=== Travel and Transport (Winter 1971) ===
No. overall	No. in series	Title	Original release date
11	1	"Program 1"	13 January 1971
12	2	"Program 2"	20 January 1971
13	3	"Program 3"	27 January 1971
14	4	"Program 4"	3 February 1971
15	5	"Program 5"	10 February 1971
16	6	"Program 6"	17 February 1971
17	7	"Program 7"	3 March 1971
18	8	"Program 8"	10 March 1971
19	9	"Program 9"	17 March 1971
20	10	"End-of-Term Concert"	24 March 1971

=== Spells and Riddles (Spring 1971) ===
No. overall	No. in series	Title	Original release date
21	1	"Program 1"	28 April 1971
22	2	"Program 2"	5 May 1971
23	3	"Program 3"	12 May 1971
24	4	"Program 4"	19 May 1971
25	5	"Program 5"	26 May 1971
26	6	"Program 6"	9 June 1971
27	7	"The Music Time Game"	16 June 1971
28	8	"End-of-Term Concert"	23 June 1971

=== Animals (Autumn 1971) ===
No. overall	No. in series	Title	Original release date
29	1	TBA	22 September 1971
30	2	TBA	29 September 1971
31	3	TBA	6 October 1971
32	4	TBA	13 October 1971
33	5	TBA	20 October 1971
34	6	TBA	3 November 1971
35	7	TBA	10 November 1971
36	8	TBA	17 November 1971
37	9	TBA	24 November 1971
38	10	TBA	1 December 1971

=== Coppélia (Winter 1972) ===
No. overall	No. in series	Title	Original release date
39	1	TBA	12 January 1972
40	2	TBA	19 January 1972
41	3	TBA	26 January 1972
42	4	TBA	2 February 1972
43	5	TBA	9 February 1972
44	6	TBA	16 February 1972
45	7	TBA	1 March 1972
46	8	TBA	8 March 1972
47	9	TBA	15 March 1972
48	10	TBA	22 March 1972

=== A River Journey (Spring 1972) ===
No. overall	No. in series	Title	Original release date
49	1	TBA	26 April 1972
50	2	TBA	3 May 1972
51	3	TBA	10 May 1972
52	4	TBA	17 May 1972
53	5	TBA	24 May 1972
54	6	TBA	7 June 1972
55	7	TBA	14 June 1972
56	8	TBA	21 June 1972

=== A Christmas Journey (1977) ===
No. overall	No. in series	Title	Original release date
57	1	"The Sounds Around Us"	19 September 1977
58	2	"High Sounds, Low Sounds"	26 September 1977
59	3	"Long Sounds, Short Sounds"	3 October 1977
60	4	"Feel the Beat"	10 October 1977
61	5	"Rhythm"	17 October 1977
62	6	"Collecting Sounds"	24 October 1977
63	7	"Sound Traps"	7 November 1977
64	8	"A Christmas Journey Introduction"	14 November 1977
65	9	"A Christmas Journey 1"	21 November 1977
66	10	"A Christmas Journey 2"	28 November 1977

=== Coppélia (Winter 1978) ===
No. overall	No. in series	Title	Original release date
67	1	"Tunes Shapes"	9 January 1978
68	2	"Tunes Patterns"	16 January 1978
69	3	"Snap"	23 January 1978
70	4	"Happy Families"	30 January 1978
71	5	"Follow My Leader"	6 February 1978
72	6	"Holding On"	13 February 1978
73	7	"Sounds Maps"	20 February 1978
74	8	"Playing the Score"	27 February 1978
75	9	"Coppélia Introduction"	6 March 1978
76	10	"Coppélia"	13 March 1978

=== Laughing Bird (Spring 1978) ===
No. overall	No. in series	Title	Original release date
77	1	TBA	17 April 1978
78	2	TBA	24 April 1978
79	3	TBA	3 May 1978
80	4	TBA	8 May 1978
81	5	TBA	15 May 1978
82	6	TBA	22 May 1978
83	7	TBA	5 June 1978
84	8	"Laughing Bird"	12 June 1978

=== The Nutcracker and the Mouse King (Autumn 1978) ===
No. overall	No. in series	Title	Original release date
85	1	"Sounds in the Country 1"	18 September 1978
86	2	"Sounds in the Country 2"	25 September 1978
87	3	"Sounds by the Sea 1"	2 October 1978
88	4	"Sounds by the Sea 2"	9 October 1978
89	5	"Twos and Threes 1"	16 October 1978
90	6	"Twos and Threes 2"	23 October 1978
91	7	"Christmas Carols 1"	6 November 1978
92	8	"Christmas Carols 2"	13 November 1978
93	9	"The Nutcracker and the Mouse King"	20 November 1978
94	10	"A Christmas Concert"	27 November 1978

=== The Big Balloon Show (1979) ===
No. overall	No. in series	Title	Original release date
95	1	"In the Town 1"	30 April 1979
96	2	"In the Town 2"	9 May 1979
97	3	"At the Fair 1"	14 May 1979
98	4	"At the Fair 2"	21 May 1979
99	5	"In the Factory 1"	4 June 1979
100	6	"In the Factory 2"	11 June 1979
101	7	"On the Sea"	18 June 1979
102	8	"The Big Balloon Show"	25 June 1979

=== Lieutenant Kijé (1980) ===
No. overall	No. in series	Title	Original release date
103	1	"Watch and Listen"	14 January 1980
104	2	"Does it Come Back?"	21 January 1980
105	3	"Fast and Slow"	28 January 1980
106	4	"Clap and Tap"	4 February 1980
107	5	"Copycats"	11 February 1980
108	6	"In Harmony"	25 February 1980
109	7	"Play the Game"	3 March 1980
110	8	"Lieutenant Kijé 1"	10 March 1980
111	9	"Lieutenant Kijé 2"	17 March 1980
112	10	"The Story of Lieutenant Kijé"	24 March 1980

=== The Evening Star (1981) ===
No. overall	No. in series	Title	Original release date
113	1	"The Evening Star"	5 May 1981
114	2	"Hunting"	11 May 1981
115	3	"Stars"	18 May 1981
116	4	"The Animals"	1 June 1981
117	5	"The Garden"	8 June 1981
118	6	"Dancing"	15 June 1981
119	7	"Voices"	22 June 1981
120	8	"Water"	29 June 1981

=== A Gift for the Baby (1983) ===
No. overall	No. in series	Title	Original release date
121	1	"Working with Sounds"	19 September 1983
122	2	"Long Sounds, Short Sounds"	26 September 1983
123	3	"Higher and Lower"	3 October 1983
124	4	"The Sounds of the Voice"	10 October 1983
125	5	"The Sounds of Words"	17 October 1983
126	6	"Call and Response"	31 October 1983
127	7	"The Regular Beat"	7 November 1983
128	8	"Fast and Slow"	14 November 1983
129	9	"Grouping Beats"	21 November 1983
130	10	"A Gift for the Baby"	28 November 1983

=== The Sleeping Beauty (Winter 1984) ===
No. overall	No. in series	Title	Original release date
131	1	"Rhythm and the Beat"	16 January 1984
132	2	"Rhythms Together"	23 January 1984
133	3	"Tune Shapes"	30 January 1984
134	4	"Musical Patterns"	6 February 1984
135	5	"Contrasts"	13 February 1984
136	6	"Question and Answer"	27 February 1984
137	7	"Harmony"	5 March 1984
138	8	"The Sleeping Beauty 1"	12 March 1984
139	9	"The Sleeping Beauty 2"	19 March 1984
140	10	"The Sleeping Beauty"	26 March 1984

=== Dick Whittington (Autumn 1984) ===
No. overall	No. in series	Title	Original release date
141	1	"Footsteps"	17 September 1984
142	2	"Time Span"	24 September 1984
143	3	"Sound Signals"	1 October 1984
144	4	"Traffic"	8 October 1984
145	5	"Bells"	15 October 1984
146	6	"Street Music"	29 October 1984
147	7	"Keeping Together"	5 November 1984
148	8	"Tempo"	12 November 1984
149	9	"Rhythms"	19 November 1984
150	10	"Dick Whittington"	26 November 1984

=== Háry János (Winter 1985) ===
No. overall	No. in series	Title	Original release date
151	1	"Two in a Bar"	14 January 1985
152	2	"Grouping Beats"	21 January 1985
153	3	"Melody"	28 January 1985
154	4	"ABA"	4 February 1985
155	5	"Musical Clocks"	11 February 1985
156	6	"Copy Me"	25 February 1985
157	7	"Harmony"	4 March 1985
158	8	"Háry János 1"	11 March 1985
159	9	"Háry János 2"	18 March 1985
160	10	"Háry János"	25 March 1985

=== Anansi and the Sky God (Spring 1985) ===
No. overall	No. in series	Title	Original release date
161	1	"Anansi and the Sky God"	29 April 1985
162	2	"Talking Drums"	9 May 1985
163	3	"Pottery"	13 May 1985
164	4	"The Bush"	20 May 1985
165	5	"The Weavers"	27 May 1985
166	6	"The Sky God"	10 June 1985
167	7	"Creatures of the Bush"	17 June 1985
168	8	"Follow the Drum"	24 June 1985

=== Panji and the Buffalo (1986) ===
No. overall	No. in series	Title	Original release date
169	1	"Panji and the Buffalo"	21 April 1986
170	2	"The Padi-fields"	28 April 1986
171	3	"On the Road"	8 May 1986
172	4	"The Animals"	12 May 1986
173	5	"Shadow Puppets"	19 May 1986
174	6	"The Gamelan"	2 June 1986
175	7	"Java Food"	9 June 1986
176	8	"The Ceremonial Meal"	16 June 1986

=== Tarfa and the Trolls (1989) ===
No. overall	No. in series	Title	Original release date
177	1	"Tarfa and the Trolls"	18 September 1989
178	2	"Housework"	25 September 1989
179	3	"Wooden Sounds"	2 October 1989
180	4	"Metal Sounds"	9 October 1989
181	5	"Sleigh Ride"	16 October 1989
182	6	"Voices"	30 October 1989
183	7	"Loud and Quiet"	6 November 1989
184	8	"Drummers"	13 November 1989
185	9	"Duets"	20 November 1989
186	10	"The Orchestra"	27 November 1989

=== Pictures at an Exhibition (Winter 1990) ===
No. overall	No. in series	Title	Original release date
187	1	"Promenade"	15 January 1990
188	2	"Smooth and Spiky"	22 January 1990
189	3	"The Castle"	29 January 1990
190	4	"Machines"	5 February 1990
191	5	"Transport"	12 February 1990
192	6	"Birdsong"	26 February 1990
193	7	"Catacombs"	5 March 1990
194	8	"The Gnome"	12 March 1990
195	9	"The Gardens"	19 March 1990
196	10	"Rondo"	26 March 1990

=== The Emperor and the Nightingale (Spring 1990) ===
No. overall	No. in series	Title	Original release date
197	1	"The Emperor and the Nightingale"	30 April 1990
198	2	"Reflections"	10 May 1990
199	3	"Pentatonic"	14 May 1990
200	4	"Songbirds"	21 May 1990
201	5	"Chinese Birds"	4 June 1990
202	6	"Mechanical Sounds"	11 June 1990
203	7	"Chinese Music"	18 June 1990
204	8	"Lanterns and Lions"	25 June 1990

=== Cinderella (Autumn 1990) ===
No. overall	No. in series	Title	Original release date
205	1	"Cinderella"	17 September 1990
206	2	"The Kitchen"	24 September 1990
207	3	"Paper Sounds"	1 October 1990
208	4	"Grouping Beats"	8 October 1990
209	5	"The Beat"	15 October 1990
210	6	"Mystery Sounds"	29 October 1990
211	7	"Changing Tunes"	5 November 1990
212	8	"Dancers"	12 November 1990
213	9	"Ups and Downs"	19 November 1990
214	10	"Cinderella's Christmas"	26 November 1990

=== The Planets (1991) ===
No. overall	No. in series	Title	Original release date
215	1	"A Space Journey"	7 January 1991
216	2	"Mars"	14 January 1991
217	3	"Mercury"	21 January 1991
218	4	"Jupiter"	28 January 1991
219	5	"Uranus"	4 February 1991
220	6	"Saturn"	11 February 1991
221	7	"Venus"	25 February 1991
222	8	"Neptune"	4 March 1991
223	9	"The Planets 1"	11 March 1991
224	10	"The Planets 2"	18 March 1991
