= Kathryn Harries =

English soprano

- Born: Kathryn Gwynne Harries; 15 February 1951; Hampton Court Palace
- Died: 26 May 2023 (aged 72)
- Alma mater: Surbiton High School; Royal Academy of Music
- Occupation: Opera singer, television presenter
- Awards: Officer of the Order of the British Empire (2019)
- Website: http://kathrynharries.co.uk/

Kathryn Harries (15 February 1951 – 26 May 2023) was a British operatic soprano. She taught at Kingston Polytechnic (now Kingston University). For several years she worked as a presenter for Music Time beginning in 1977.

Harries made her opera debut in 1983 in a production of Parsifal at the Welsh National Opera (WNO). She performed multiple time with the WNO as well as other UK venues including the English National Opera, the Glyndebourne Festival Opera, the Opera North in Leeds, and the Scottish Opera. Harries debuted at the Metropolitan Opera in 1986.

Harries was the director of the National Opera Studio in London from 2008 through 2017.

In 2019 Harries was awarded the Order of the British Empire. She died on 27 May 2023.
