= Play School (New Zealand TV series) =

- Country of origin: New Zealand

Production
- Camera setup: Multi-Camera

Original release
- Network: TVNZ
- Release: 22 March 1972 – 1990

Play School is a New Zealand educational television show for children. It is based on the British Play School show. The series first aired in 1972, and ended in 1990.

== Synopsis ==
Play School was first broadcast in New Zealand on Tuesday 22 March 1972 for a 26-week trial period, with a group of six hosts chosen, one pair for each week. Series one and two continued to be broadcast twice weekly, Tuesday and Thursday at around 4.30pm.

Its first producer was David Istance, an ex-BBC TV floor manager, who had worked on the British Play School, as well as comedies All Gas and Gaiters and Hugh and I Spy during the 1960s. He later returned to the UK and worked as a production assistant on Juliet Bravo (1980) and then as a production manager on Bergerac, Juliet Bravo, All Creatures Great and Small (1983), Malestrom and Tenko Reunion (1985) and in the mid-80s worked at BBC TV Training at Elstree Studios.

It was originally recorded at AKTV2's Shortland Street studios in Auckland, and in January 1975 moved to TVNZ's Dunedin studios being screened twice a day at around 10am and then 2:30pm. For a brief period in 1986, the programme was recorded at TVNZ's Christchurch studios. The final edition, recorded in March 1989 was number 440, presented by Pauline Durning and John Mann. The last series screened on television in 1990.

The show was provided by the BBC in "kitset" form. They supplied scripts and also short filmed items for showing "through the windows".

The show stars five toys. They are:

- Big Ted: A traditional-style golden coloured teddy bear
- Little Ted: Identical to Big Ted, but much smaller
- Manu: A very human-looking plastic doll with Māori features, such as dark skin and hair
- Jemima: A rag doll with orange woollen hair
- Humpty: A round green fabric toy resembling Humpty Dumpty.

Today, Big Ted, Manu, Jemima, and Humpty are part of a collection at the Museum of New Zealand Te Papa Tongarewa in Wellington, New Zealand. The museum also has a large collection of clothing and props from the show. Little Ted's head was blown from his body by the film crew after the completion of the final series. The body can be seen at the Otago Settlers Museum in Dunedin while the head remains in private ownership. The original clock from the series was discovered at a library in Invercargill in August 2009.

In 2005, TV2 started to screen the Australian version of Play School. It features New Zealand presenter Jay Laga'aia who has been on the show since 2000, though the Australian version is significantly different from the New Zealand version, which was similar to the British format of the 70s and 80s.

== Cast ==
The founding presenters were Waric Slyfield and Janet (née Chaafe) Milne. They presented most of the programmes made in the first year of production (1972), with some presented by Ken Rea and Val Lamond. Waric and Janet were joined the following year by Jan Johnstone, Ray Woolf and Elizabeth Rogers.

Pianists included Ossie Cheesman.

Other presenters were:

- Colin Francis (1979)
- Wayne/Gabriel Alston (1975–76)
- Timothy Bartlett (1987–89)
- Janine Barry (1975–77)
- Dallas Beckett
- Grant Bridger
- Jeremy Brownbrook (née Brookes)
- Winsome Dacker Aroha (1980–82)
- Jacqui Dean (née Hay)
- Barry Dorking (1976–82)
- Pauline Durning (née Nitis-Cooper) (1975–78; 1982; 1987–89)
- Ray Edkins/Steven Ray
- Deb Faith
- Nick Farra (1988)
- Kristen Gillespie (1986–88)
- Doris Giesen (1975–76)
- Theresa Healey
- Campbell Hegan (1974–76)
- Ian Kingsford-Smith
- Laugharne (née Stockham) Laughananda (1975–76)
- Kerry McCammon (1986)
- Michael McGrath (1976)
- John Mann (1987–89)
- Shaquelle Maybury
- Eilish (née Moran) Wahren (1986)
- Margot Nash (1975)
- Jayashree Panjabi (1980–81)
- Rawiri Paratene (1980–82)
- Katy Platt (1975–76)
- Kathryn Rawlings (1975–77)
- Mike Rehu
- Tania Robins (1987)
- Russell Smith (1987)
- Ian Taylor
- Marcus Turner
- Peter Verstappen
- Greg Wells

== Musicians ==
- Russell Sheppard
- Ian (Eli) Gray-Smith
- Neville Copland
- Graeme Perkins
- Mary Ruston
- Murray Wood

== See also ==
- Play School (Australian TV series)
- Play School (British TV series)
- Polka Dot Door
- Playdays
- Play Away
- Tikkabilla
- Zoom
- Mister Rogers' Neighborhood
- Captain Kangaroo
- Sesame Street
