= Jonathan Cohen (musician) =

British musician

Jonathan Frank Cohen (born 8 June 1946) is a British pianist, composer and musical director.

== Early life ==
He grew up in St John's Wood. He practiced the organ at St Mark's, Hamilton Terrace.

He studied music at university. In the late 1960s, he was the organist of St James's, Spanish Place, and the conductor of the London Co-operative Choir, taking the choir to Czechoslovakia, when Russia invaded. Also in the late 1960s, he went on tour with John Boulter.

== Career ==
He is known for his work on many BBC children's programmes from the 1960s to the 1990s, including Play School, Playbus (latterly Playdays), Play Away, Sesame Street, Rentaghost and Jackanory. He appeared as a pianist on programmes such as Play Away and also presented some of the musical items.

In the latter part of his career, he became heavily involved with programmes for BBC Schools co-presenting Music Time with Helen Speirs. This was a popular, long-running series aimed at primary school children that focused on teaching singing and instrumentation. First broadcast in 1970, it was presented by Cohen from 1983 until the final series in 1991. He also had prominent roles on several other BBC Schools series aimed at older Junior children, notably the award-winning series The Music Arcade (1979-1986), and Into Music (1989-1991).

In 2005, he staged a theatre production called Still Playing Away alongside former Play Away presenter Brian Cant, which was a trip down memory lane of the 1960s, 1970s, and 1980s.

He leads the annual Christmas Carol Singalong at the Barbican Centre in London, the Symphony Hall in Birmingham and the Bridgewater Hall in Manchester, regularly joined by West End actress and singer Louise Dearman, using his own arrangements of traditional Christmas songs and carols.

== Selected discography ==
- 1973 - Play Away. BBC Records (RBT 19)
- 1975 - "Hey You!" - Songs from The BBC TV Series "Play Away". BBC Records and Tapes (REC 209)
- 1981 - Hello! - Songs from BBC TV's "Play School" and "Play Away". BBC Records (REC 425)
- 1984 - Singing In The Band - Songs from BBC TV's "Play School" and "Play Away". BBC Records (REC 495)
- 1986 - Elisabeth Welch in Concert. First Night Records (OCR CD6016)

== Music for television ==
- Jackanory
- Rentaghost
- Galloping Galaxies!
- Playdays
- Greenclaws
- Uncle Jack
- Come Outside
- Living Within The Seasons (Alongside Peter Hodges)
- Step Inside
- Storytime
- Sesame Street
- Melvin and Maureen's Music-a-grams
- Monster Café (series 2)
- Julia Jekyll and Harriet Hyde
