= Play Away =

British children's TV series (1971–1984)

Play Away is a British television children's programme. A sister programme to the infants' series Play School, it was aimed at slightly older children.

It ran from 1971 until 1984, and was broadcast on Saturday afternoons on BBC 2. While Play School had a more gentle, intimate feel, featuring just two presenters in a studio with the usual collection of toys, Play Away was much more lively, including songs, games and many jokes. The first eight series were shot in a studio, usually at BBC Television Centre, London, but certain episodes were recorded in Bristol or Manchester. Later episodes were recorded in front of a live studio audience. The format was a little like a music-hall variety show or 'end-of-the-pier' show. The musical director was Jonathan Cohen on piano, with Spike Heatley on double bass and Alan Rushton on drums, often with accomplished guest musicians such as trombonist George Chisholm. In Australia the series aired on ABC at 4:30 after the Australian version of Play School. In New Zealand the series aired on TV One during the 1970s and 1980s.

Presenters during the 13-year run included familiar Play School presenters such as Brian Cant, Toni Arthur, Derek Griffiths, Lionel Morton, Chloe Ashcroft, Floella Benjamin, Johnny Ball, Carol Chell and Julie Stevens, as well as lesser known presenters including Janine Sharp, Matthew Devitt and Kim Goody. Play Away presenters such as Jeremy Irons, Julie Covington, Anita Dobson, Tony Robinson and Alex Norton went on to greater prominence in related fields.

According to the Kaleidoscope Children's Guide and the Lost Shows website, much of this series is no longer in the archives. Out of 191 editions, 132 no longer exist, with some episodes having been wiped in the early 1990s.
