= Play School (British TV series) =

British children's TV series (1964–1988)

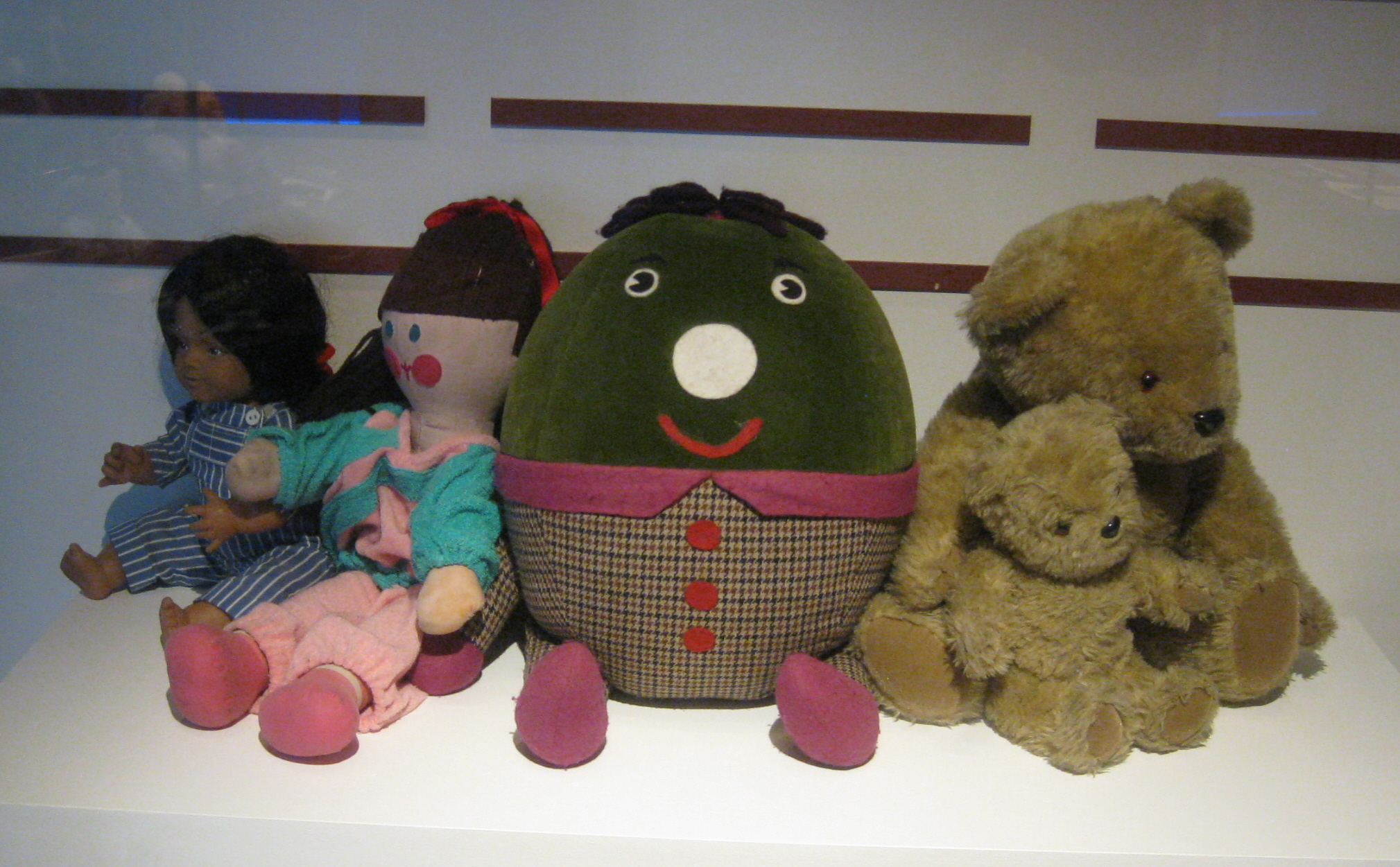
- Poppy, Jemima, Humpty, Little Ted & Big Ted at the National Science and Media Museum
- Genre: Children's television series
- Created by: Joy Whitby
- Starring: Various presenters
- Country of origin: United Kingdom
- Original language: English
- No. of episodes: 6,866 (3,663 missing)

Production
- Executive producer: Cynthia Felgate (1972–1983)
- Running time: 23 minutes

Original release
- Network: BBC2
- Release: 21 April 1964 – 16 September 1983
- Network: BBC1
- Release: 19 September 1983 – 12 September 1988

Play School is a British children's television series produced by the BBC which ran from 21 April 1964 until 12 September 1988. It was created by Joy Whitby and was aimed at preschool children. Each programme followed a broad theme and consisted of songs, stories and activities with presenters in the studio, along with a short film introduced through either the square, round or arched window in the set.

The programme spawned numerous spin-offs in Britain and other countries and involved many presenters and musicians during its run. Despite a revamp in 1983, Play School maintained the same basic formula throughout its 24-year history, but changes to the BBC's children's output led to the programme's cancellation in 1988, when it was replaced by Playbus, which soon became Playdays. A revived version is expected to air on CBeebies in 2027/28.

== Broadcast history ==
Play School was the first programme shown on BBC2's launch day. It originally appeared on weekdays at 11 am on BBC2 and received holiday runs on BBC1 in Summer 1964 and 1965, later acquiring a mid-afternoon BBC1 repeat as the opening programme of BBC1's teatime children's schedule. The morning showing was transferred to BBC1 on 19 September 1983 when BBC Schools programming transferred to BBC2, and was shown 30 minutes earlier, at 10.30am. It remained in that slot after daytime television was launched in October 1986 and continued to be broadcast at that time until the programme ended in October 1988.

When the BBC scrapped the afternoon edition of Play School in April 1985 to make way for new programmes in that slot, a Sunday morning compilation was launched called Hello Again!. This came seven months after the programme's length was reduced from 25 minutes to 20 minutes.

There were several opening sequences for Play School during its run, the first being "Here's a house, here's a door. Windows: 1 2 3 4. Ready to knock? Turn the lock – It's Play School". This changed in the early 1970s to "A house – with a door. 1, 2, 3, 4. Ready to play? What's the day? It's..." In this version blinds opened on the windows as the numbers were spoken.

A new title sequence debuted on 30 April 1979. The blinds were no longer featured and the word "windows" was added before "1 2 3 4". The final opening sequence involved a multicoloured house with no apparent windows. This was used from 1983 until the end of the programme. This saw the most radical revamp of the programme overall (not just in the opening titles). The opening legend then became "Get ready. To play. What's the day? It's...".

Unlike earlier BBC programmes aimed at preschool children such as Watch with Mother, Play School featured real presenters who spoke directly to their audience. Presenters included the first black host of a children's show, Paul Danquah; Brian Cant, who remained with the show for 21 years; actress Julie Stevens; Canadian actor and television presenter Rick Jones; TV personality Johnny Ball; former pop singers Lionel Morton and Toni Arthur; husband and wife Eric Thompson and Phyllida Law; Italian model and actor Marla Landi; and Balamory producer Brian Jameson. Don Spencer and Diane Dorgan also appeared on the Australian version. Play School and another BBC children's television programme Jackanory were sometimes recorded at BBC Birmingham or BBC Manchester when BBC Television Centre in London was busy.

On 24 September 2026, the BBC announced a revival of Play School that is expected to air in 2027/28. The new version will be "reimagined" for a new audience and will include a "blend of songs, stories, movement, music, poetry and imaginative play for today's audiences". Applications for interested companies to produce the new version opened on the same day.

== Contents of the show ==
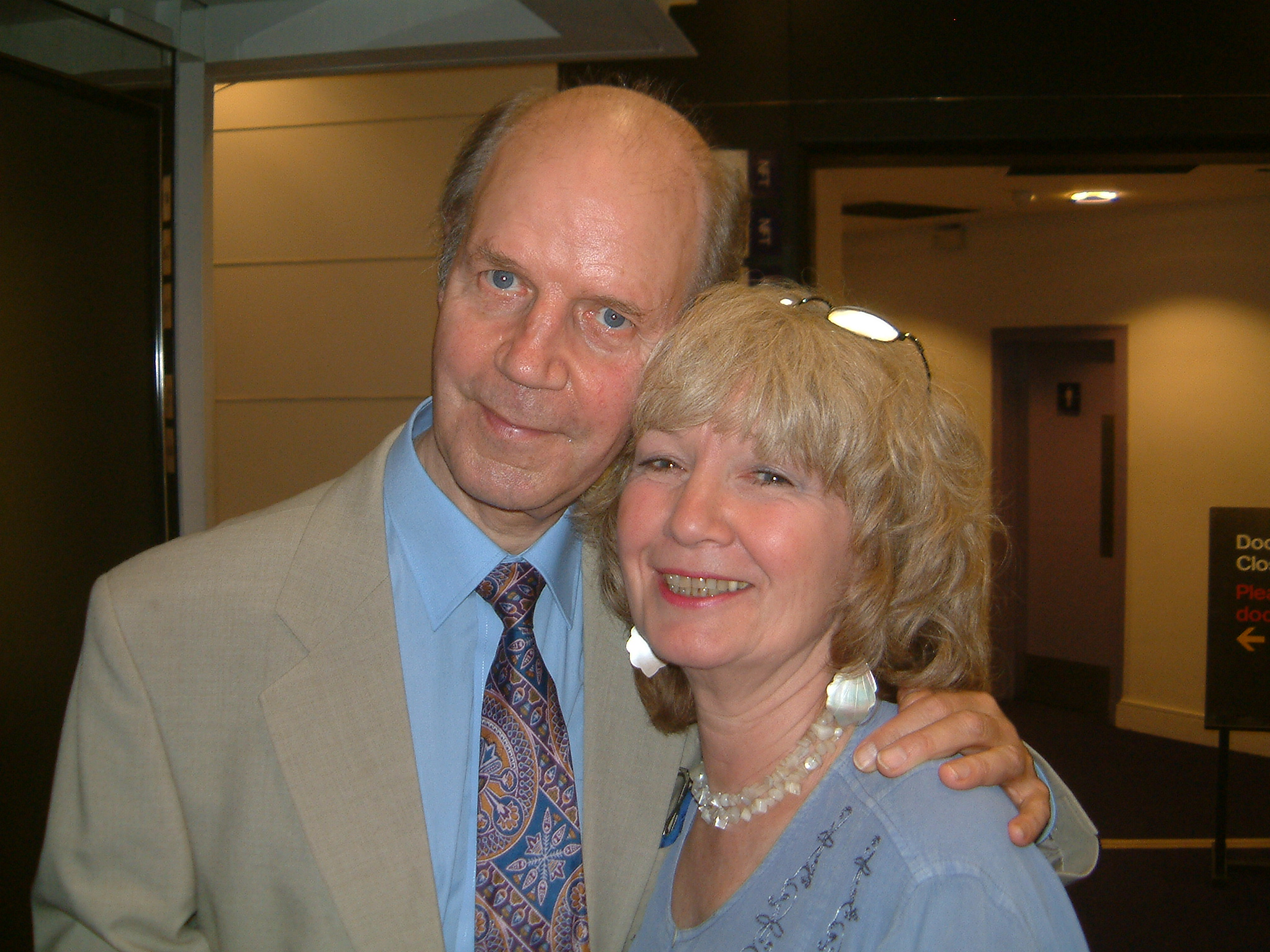
Presenters Brian Cant and Julie Stevens at a 2004 reunion event

A section of each episode was a filmed excursion into the outside world taken through one of three windows: the young viewers were invited to guess whether the round, square, or arched window would be chosen that day, usually by means of the phrase, "...Have a look – through the....(whichever) window". A triangular window was added in 1983. Very often the film would be of a factory producing something such as chocolate biscuits, or of a domestic industry such as refuse collection, but a number of subject matters were covered, such as watching animals or fish, boats on a lake, children in a playground or at school, a family going tenpin bowling, people in a café and visiting a jumble sale, among other things.

At the beginning of the 1983 revamp, the windows were now referred to as "shapes" as in "let's have a look through one of the shapes...". After the shapes were moved to a spinning disc, the programme went back to using windows which resembled those used in the late 70s, albeit with the addition of the triangular window. Whenever they were shown now, only the window that the show was using for the day would be on the set.

Each episode would also include a short story read from a book, introduced by checking the time on a clock. Normally the clock would show either an hour or a half hour and the young viewers were asked, "Can you tell what time the clock says today? Well, the long hand is pointing straight up, so that means it's something o'clock – and the short hand is pointing to the number...two (or whatever). So today, the clock says, two...o'...clock" (the latter phrase always delivered very slowly). This was followed by, "But what's underneath the clock?", and viewers would then see a turntable under the clock featuring certain items such as toy animals or clocks, which were, in a clever twist, always a clue to the forthcoming story. This was all accompanied by a slightly eerie, yet undeniably catchy, clock-like tune. (On one occasion, the item under the clock turned out to be none other than Little Ted, so the presenter concerned said, "What a very odd place for a toy to be!" and the story appropriately turned out to be about odd things.)

Both the clock and the three window option live on in the children's programme Tikkabilla, which borrows much from Play School, while a similar choice of portal into a film clip was provided by the abdomen-mounted video displays in the children's show Teletubbies.

Most of the programmes were studio-based, but there were a number of outside broadcasts at a variety of locations, such as zoos, seasides, central London, churches, schools and farms.

There would also be songs, games, poems and stories, as well as regular painting and craft activities. The presenters would frequently invite the younger viewers to participate at home, usually by means of the prompt, 'Can you do that?' They normally signed off at the end of each episode by saying, "Time for us to go now, but only until tomorrow, so goodbye until tomorrow" – or, at the end of a week, "Goodbye, until it's our turn to be here again". (The latter phrase stemmed from the fact that the presenters changed from one week to the next.)

From 1971 to 1984, Play School also had a sister programme called Play Away.

Many 2 inch Quadruplex videotape master copies of Play School editions were wiped by the BBC in 1993 on the assumption that they were of no further use and that only a small number of episodes needed to be retained in the archive. As a result 3664 went missing.

On 14 October 2024, the Film Is Fabulous project announced that they had recovered an episode of the show, namely the black-and-white episode first broadcast on 12 August 1965, with presenters Marian Diamond and Rick Jones. the recovery of the episode is aptly timed as the show was celebrating its 60th anniversary. This brought the number of episodes missing down to 3663.

== Overseas sales and adoption ==
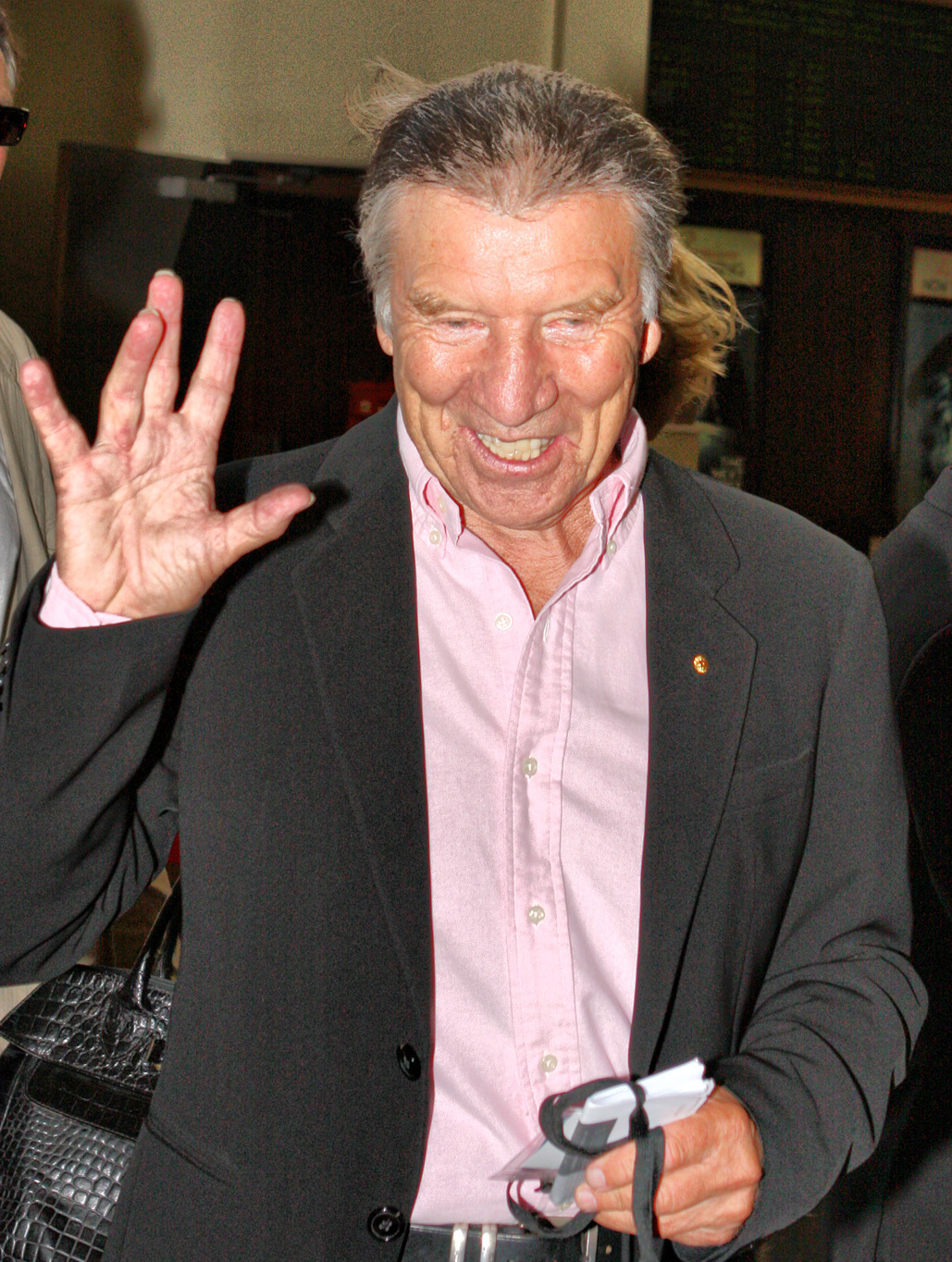
Don Spencer, who appeared on the original British version and also on the Australian adaptation

Play School was sold to Australia, and was then followed by local production. The Australian version has been produced since 1966, and is the only version still in production. Similarly New Zealand bought the programme before producing their own from 1972 to 1982 & 1986 to 1989. The Canadian adaptation was Polka Dot Door and ran from 1971 to 1993.

Other countries including Lekestue in Norway (1971–81), Das Spielhaus in Switzerland (1968–1994), Das Kleine Haus in Austria (1969–1975), Giocagiò in Italy (1966–1970), La Casa Del Reloj in Spain (1971–74), and Israel were provided with scripts and film segments so they could produce their own versions.

== Presenters ==
sourced from: BBC Programme index (formerly BBC Genome)

| Name | Tenure | Notes |
| Gordon Rollings | 1964-1967 | Rollings was the original male host appeared in first episode broadcast 21 April 1964 |
| Virginia Stride | 1964-1965 | Stride was the original female host along Gordon Rolling an Ewa seated in the first episode broadcast 21 April 1964 |
| Brian Cant | 1964-1987 | Cant was a long term presenter who featured across the series three decade run and over 600 episodes |
| Julie Stevens | 1964-1978 | Early presenter |
| Rick Jones | 1964-1973 | |
| Carole Ward | 1964-1971 | |
| Marla Landi | 1964-1976 | |
| Terence Frisby | 1964-1967 | credited Terence Holland |
| Eric Thompson | 1964-1967 | (of The Magic Roundabout fame) and his wife |
| Phyllida Law | 1964-1966 | also known as Dame Phyllida Law |
| Valerie Pitts | 1965-1969 | Later known Lady Solti |
| Colin Jeavons | 1965-1983 | |
| Gordon Clyde | 1965-1970 | |
| Paul Danquah | 1965 | Notable as th first black presenter on the programme |
| Carol Chell | 1966-1987 | appeared across all three decade; longest serving female presenter |
| Miranda Connell | 1966-1975 | |
| Johnny Ball] | 1967-1987 | Appeared as a präsenter for 20 years, across all three decades |
| John White | 1967-1971 | |
| Lionel Morton | 1968-1985 | |
| Chloe Ashcroft | 1969-1987 | Ashcroft featured across the series entire three decades |
| Diane Dorgan | 1969-1974 | Dorgan was also an original presenter on the Australia version tenure;1966-1969 with Alister Smart |
| Johnny Silvo | 1970-1974 | |
| Sarah Long | 1971-1986 | |
| Derek Griffiths | 1971-1986 | |
| Toni Arthur | 1971-1975 | |
| Don Spencer | 1972-1986 | Spencer also present the Australian version from 1969-1992 |
| Carmen Munroe | 1972-1974 | |
| Fred Harris | 1973-1987 | |
| Jon Glover | 1973-1976 | |
| Karen Platt | 1974-1978 | |
| Carol Leader | 1975-1986 | |
| Stuart McGugan | 1975-1986 | |
| Chris Tranchell | 1975-1984 | |
| Floella Benjamin | 1976-1987 | |
| Delia Morgan | 1977-1986 | |
| Ben Bazell | 1978-1985 | |
| Sheelagh Gilbey | 1979-1987 | |
| Elizabeth Millbank | 1979-1985 | |
| Ben Thomas | 1980-1987 | |
| Lucie Skeaping | 1980-1982 | |
| Andy Secombe | 1981-1986 | |
| Iain Lauchlan | 1982-1987 | |
| Patrick Abernethy | 1982-1983 | |
| Elizabeth Watts | 1983-1987 | |
| Brian Jameson | 1983-1987 | |
| Wayne Jackman | 1983-1987 | |
| Kate Copstick | 1983-1986 | |
| Jane Hardy | 1984-1987 | |
| Mike Amatt | 1986-1987 | |

- Only four of these presenters presented the programme during all three decades of its existence, namely Brian Cant (1964–85), Carol Chell (1966–88), Johnny Ball (1967–84 & 1986–87) and Chloe Ashcroft (1969–88). Chell was both the longest-serving presenter and the one who made the most appearances on the programme (763 in total). In addition, two regular presenters from the 1960s and 1970s, namely Lionel Morton and Colin Jeavons, made a few guest appearances on the programme during the 1980s.

Other presenters who were on the programme for 10 or more years included Julie Stevens, Derek Griffiths, Fred Harris, Don Spencer, Sarah Long, Floella Benjamin, Stuart McGugan and Carol Leader.

In many cases five programmes would be produced in the space of two days, with one day of rehearsal and one day of recording.

== Celebrity storytellers ==
A number of famous people also appeared on the show as storytellers: many became semi-regulars. They included: Val Doonican, Richard Baker, Rolf Harris, Clive Dunn, Roy Castle, Pat Coombs, David Kossoff, Patricia Hayes, Sam Kydd, James Blades, Frank Windsor, Roy Kinnear, George Chisholm, Ted Moult and Cilla Black. Both existing and former Play School presenters also frequently made guest appearances as storytellers.

== Musicians ==
Many musicians worked on the programme over the years: they included Jonathan Cohen, William Blezard, Peter Gosling, Alan Grahame, Paul Reade, Spike Heatley, Alan Rushton, Pedro Goble, Anne Dudley, John Gould, Martin Yates, Peter Pontzen and Peter Pettinger. Some of them, in particular Cohen, Gosling, Grahame and Reade, occasionally appeared on camera, especially during Christmas editions.

== Toys ==
The presenters were accompanied by a supporting cast of cuddly toys and dolls. The five regulars were:

- Humpty, a dark green large egg-shaped soft toy with tweed trousers, to look like Humpty Dumpty from the nursery rhyme, as he was the first Play School toy introduced, since the first programme on 21 April 1964. Several versions were made.
- Teddy/Big Ted and Little Ted, twin teddy bears. Little Ted debuted in 1968. Before this, Big Ted was called "Teddy".
- Jemima, a rag doll with long red (or pink) and white striped legs.
- Hamble was a little doll and one of the original five toys but dropped from the show during the 1980s to be replaced by Poppy. According to Joy Whitby, creator of Play School, Hamble was chosen as representative of a more "downtrodden", humble background than the "middle-class" associations that the teddy bears had. She was disliked by presenters as she could not be cuddled. According to the BBC website Chloe Ashcroft "did a terrible thing to Hamble. She just would not sit up...so one day I got a very big knitting needle, a big wooden one, and I stuck it right up her bum, as far as her head. So she was completely rigid, and she was much much better after that".
- Poppy, a black doll, replaced Hamble in November 1986 in response to changing attitudes in society (the Hamble doll was also getting rather fragile at this point).

A rocking horse named Dapple, after Jeremy Bentham's horse, was first seen in May 1965 and made occasional appearances, when a particular song or item suggested it. The final line up of toys are on display as exhibits of the National Science and Media Museum, Bradford. The original Humpty was developed by soft toy makers "Ostrobogulous Toys", run by Kristin Baybars—daughter of Blair Hughes-Stanton and Ida Affleck Graves—and Minnie King. Jemima was made by Annette Shelley.

== Pets ==
- Katoo, Charlie and Sparky – cockatoo
- Bit and Bot – goldfish
- Rabbits, including Buffy, Mopsy, Peter, Benjamin and Becky.
- Mice
- Guinea pigs including Lizzy

The pets were cared for by Wendy Duggan, Fellow of the Zoological Society.

== Episodes ==
1. Unknown Episode (21 April 1964)
2. Unknown Episode (22 April 1964)
3. Unknown Episode (23 April 1964)
4. Unknown Episode (24 April 1964)
5. Unknown Episode (27 April 1964)
6. Unknown Episode (28 April 1964)
7. Unknown Episode (29 April 1964)
8. Unknown Episode (30 April 1964)
9. Unknown Episode (1 May 1964)
10. Unknown Episode (4 May 1964)
11. Unknown Episode (5 May 1964)
12. Unknown Episode (6 May 1964)
13. Unknown Episode (7 May 1964)
14. Unknown Episode (8 May 1964)
15. Unknown Episode (11 May 1964)
16. Unknown Episode (12 May 1964)
17. Unknown Episode (13 May 1964)
18. Unknown Episode (14 May 1964)
19. Unknown Episode (15 May 1964)
20. Unknown Episode (18 May 1964)
21. Unknown Episode (19 May 1964)
22. Unknown Episode (20 May 1964)
23. Unknown Episode (21 May 1964)
24. Unknown Episode (22 May 1964)
25. Unknown Episode (25 May 1964)
26. Unknown Episode (26 May 1964)
27. Unknown Episode (27 May 1964)
28. Unknown Episode (28 May 1964)
29. Unknown Episode (29 May 1964)
30. Unknown Episode (1 June 1964)
31. Unknown Episode (2 June 1964)
32. Unknown Episode (3 June 1964)
33. Unknown Episode (4 June 1964)
34. Unknown Episode (5 June 1964)
35. Unknown Episode (8 June 1964)
36. Unknown Episode (9 June 1964)
37. Unknown Episode (10 June 1964)
38. Unknown Episode (11 June 1964)
39. Unknown Episode (12 June 1964)
40. Unknown Episode (15 June 1964)
41. Unknown Episode (16 June 1964)
42. Unknown Episode (17 June 1964)
43. Unknown Episode (18 June 1964)
44. Unknown Episode (19 June 1964)
45. Unknown Episode (22 June 1964)
46. Unknown Episode (23 June 1964)
47. Unknown Episode (24 June 1964)
48. Unknown Episode (25 June 1964)
49. Unknown Episode (26 June 1964)
50. Unknown Episode (29 June 1964)
51. Unknown Episode (30 June 1964)
52. Unknown Episode (1 July 1964)
53. Unknown Episode (2 July 1964)
54. Unknown Episode (3 July 1964)
55. Unknown Episode (6 July 1964)
56. Unknown Episode (7 July 1964)
57. Unknown Episode (8 July 1964)
58. Unknown Episode (9 July 1964)
59. Unknown Episode (10 July 1964)
60. Unknown Episode (13 July 1964)
61. Unknown Episode (14 July 1964)
62. Unknown Episode (15 July 1964)
63. Unknown Episode (16 July 1964)
64. Unknown Episode (17 July 1964)
65. Unknown Episode (20 July 1964)
66. Unknown Episode (21 July 1964)
67. Unknown Episode (22 July 1964)
68. Unknown Episode (23 July 1964)
69. Unknown Episode (24 July 1964)
70. Unknown Episode (27 July 1964)
71. Unknown Episode (28 July 1964)
72. Unknown Episode (29 July 1964)
73. Unknown Episode (30 July 1964)
74. Unknown Episode (31 July 1964)
75. Unknown Episode (3 August 1964)
76. Unknown Episode (4 August 1964)
77. Unknown Episode (5 August 1964)
78. Unknown Episode (6 August 1964)
79. Unknown Episode (7 August 1964)
80. Unknown Episode (10 August 1964)
81. Unknown Episode (11 August 1964)
82. Unknown Episode (12 August 1964)
83. Unknown Episode (13 August 1964)
84. Unknown Episode (14 August 1964)
85. Unknown Episode (17 August 1964)
86. Unknown Episode (18 August 1964)
87. Unknown Episode (19 August 1964)
88. Unknown Episode (20 August 1964)
89. Unknown Episode (21 August 1964)
90. Unknown Episode (24 August 1964)
91. Unknown Episode (25 August 1964)
92. Unknown Episode (26 August 1964)
93. Unknown Episode (27 August 1964)
94. Unknown Episode (28 August 1964)
95. Unknown Episode (31 August 1964)
96. Unknown Episode (1 September 1964)
97. Unknown Episode (2 September 1964)
98. Unknown Episode (3 September 1964)
99. Unknown Episode (4 September 1964)
100. Unknown Episode (7 September 1964)
101. Unknown Episode (8 September 1964)
102. Unknown Episode (9 September 1964)
103. Unknown Episode (10 September 1964)
104. Unknown Episode (11 September 1964)
105. Unknown Episode (14 September 1964)
106. Unknown Episode (15 September 1964)
107. Unknown Episode (16 September 1964)
108. Unknown Episode (17 September 1964)
109. Unknown Episode (18 September 1964)
110. Unknown Episode (21 September 1964)
111. Unknown Episode (22 September 1964)
112. Unknown Episode (23 September 1964)
113. Unknown Episode (24 September 1964)
114. Unknown Episode (25 September 1964)
115. Unknown Episode (28 September 1964)
116. Unknown Episode (29 September 1964)
117. Unknown Episode (30 September 1964)
118. Unknown Episode (1 October 1964)
119. Unknown Episode (2 October 1964)
120. Unknown Episode (5 October 1964)
121. Unknown Episode (6 October 1964)
122. Unknown Episode (7 October 1964)
123. Unknown Episode (8 October 1964)
124. Unknown Episode (9 October 1964)
125. Unknown Episode (12 October 1964)
126. Unknown Episode (13 October 1964)
127. Unknown Episode (14 October 1964)
128. Unknown Episode (15 October 1964)
129. Unknown Episode (16 October 1964)
130. Unknown Episode (19 October 1964)
131. Unknown Episode (20 October 1964)
132. Unknown Episode (21 October 1964)
133. Unknown Episode (22 October 1964)
134. Unknown Episode (23 October 1964)
135. Unknown Episode (26 October 1964)
136. Unknown Episode (27 October 1964)
137. Unknown Episode (28 October 1964)
138. Unknown Episode (29 October 1964)
139. Unknown Episode (30 October 1964)
140. Unknown Episode (2 November 1964)
141. Unknown Episode (3 November 1964)
142. Unknown Episode (4 November 1964)
143. Unknown Episode (5 November 1964)
144. Unknown Episode (6 November 1964)
145. Unknown Episode (9 November 1964)
146. Unknown Episode (10 November 1964)
147. Unknown Episode (11 November 1964)
148. Unknown Episode (12 November 1964)
149. Unknown Episode (13 November 1964)
150. Unknown Episode (16 November 1964)
151. Unknown Episode (17 November 1964)
152. Unknown Episode (18 November 1964)
153. Unknown Episode (19 November 1964)
154. Unknown Episode (20 November 1964)
155. Unknown Episode (23 November 1964)
156. Unknown Episode (24 November 1964)
157. Unknown Episode (25 November 1964)
158. Unknown Episode (26 November 1964)
159. Unknown Episode (27 November 1964)
160. Unknown Episode (30 November 1964)
161. Unknown Episode (1 December 1964)
162. Unknown Episode (2 December 1964)
163. Unknown Episode (3 December 1964)
164. Unknown Episode (4 December 1964)
165. Unknown Episode (7 December 1964)
166. Unknown Episode (8 December 1964)
167. Unknown Episode (9 December 1964)
168. Unknown Episode (10 December 1964)
169. Unknown Episode (11 December 1964)
170. Unknown Episode (14 December 1964)
171. Unknown Episode (15 December 1964)
172. Unknown Episode (16 December 1964)
173. Unknown Episode (17 December 1964)
174. Unknown Episode (18 December 1964)
175. Unknown Episode (21 December 1964)
176. Unknown Episode (22 December 1964)
177. Unknown Episode (23 December 1964)
178. Unknown Episode (24 December 1964)
179. Unknown Episode (28 December 1964)
180. Unknown Episode (29 December 1964)
181. Unknown Episode (30 December 1964)
182. Unknown Episode (31 December 1964)
183. Unknown Episode (1 January 1965)
184. Unknown Episode (4 January 1965)
185. Unknown Episode (5 January 1965)
186. Unknown Episode (6 January 1965)
187. Unknown Episode (7 January 1965)
188. Unknown Episode (8 January 1965)
189. Unknown Episode (11 January 1965)
190. Unknown Episode (12 January 1965)
191. Unknown Episode (13 January 1965)
192. Unknown Episode (14 January 1965)
193. Unknown Episode (15 January 1965)
194. Unknown Episode (18 January 1965)
195. Unknown Episode (19 January 1965)
196. Unknown Episode (20 January 1965)
197. Unknown Episode (21 January 1965)
198. Play School Pantomime (22 January 1965)
199. Unknown Episode (25 January 1965)
200. Unknown Episode (26 January 1965)
201. Unknown Episode (27 January 1965)
202. Unknown Episode (28 January 1965)
203. Unknown Episode (29 January 1965)
204. Unknown Episode (1 February 1965)
205. Unknown Episode (2 February 1965)
206. Unknown Episode (3 February 1965)
207. Unknown Episode (4 February 1965)
208. Unknown Episode (5 February 1965)
209. Unknown Episode (8 February 1965)
210. Unknown Episode (9 February 1965)
211. Unknown Episode (10 February 1965)
212. Unknown Episode (11 February 1965)
213. Unknown Episode (12 February 1965)
214. Unknown Episode (15 February 1965)
215. Unknown Episode (16 February 1965)
216. Unknown Episode (17 February 1965)
217. Unknown Episode (18 February 1965)
218. Unknown Episode (19 February 1965)
219. Unknown Episode (22 February 1965)
220. Unknown Episode (23 February 1965)
221. Unknown Episode (24 February 1965)
222. Unknown Episode (25 February 1965)
223. Unknown Episode (26 February 1965)
224. Unknown Episode (1 March 1965)
225. Unknown Episode (2 March 1965)
226. Unknown Episode (3 March 1965)
227. Unknown Episode (4 March 1965)
228. Unknown Episode (5 March 1965)
229. Unknown Episode (8 March 1965)
230. Unknown Episode (9 March 1965)
231. Unknown Episode (10 March 1965)
232. Unknown Episode (11 March 1965)
233. Unknown Episode (12 March 1965)
234. Unknown Episode (15 March 1965)
235. Unknown Episode (16 March 1965)
236. Unknown Episode (17 March 1965)
237. Unknown Episode (18 March 1965)
238. Unknown Episode (19 March 1965)
239. Unknown Episode (22 March 1965)
240. Unknown Episode (23 March 1965)
241. Unknown Episode (24 March 1965)
242. Unknown Episode (25 March 1965)
243. Unknown Episode (26 March 1965)
244. Unknown Episode (29 March 1965)
245. Unknown Episode (30 March 1965)
246. Unknown Episode (31 March 1965)
247. Unknown Episode (1 April 1965)
248. Unknown Episode (2 April 1965)
249. Unknown Episode (5 April 1965)
250. Unknown Episode (6 April 1965)
251. Unknown Episode (7 April 1965)
252. Unknown Episode (8 April 1965)
253. Unknown Episode (9 April 1965)
254. Unknown Episode (12 April 1965)
255. Unknown Episode (13 April 1965)
256. Unknown Episode (14 April 1965)
257. Unknown Episode (15 April 1965)
258. Unknown Episode (16 April 1965)
259. Unknown Episode (19 April 1965)
260. Unknown Episode (20 April 1965)
261. Unknown Episode (21 April 1965)
262. Unknown Episode (22 April 1965)
263. Unknown Episode (23 April 1965)
264. Unknown Episode (26 April 1965)
265. Unknown Episode (27 April 1965)
266. Unknown Episode (28 April 1965)
267. Unknown Episode (29 April 1965)
268. Unknown Episode (30 April 1965)
269. Unknown Episode (3 May 1965)
270. Unknown Episode (4 May 1965)
271. Unknown Episode (5 May 1965)
272. Unknown Episode (6 May 1965)
273. Unknown Episode (7 May 1965)
274. Unknown Episode (10 May 1965)
275. Unknown Episode (11 May 1965)
276. Unknown Episode (12 May 1965)
277. Unknown Episode (13 May 1965)
278. Unknown Episode (14 May 1965)
279. Unknown Episode (17 May 1965)
280. Unknown Episode (18 May 1965)
281. Unknown Episode (19 May 1965)
282. Unknown Episode (20 May 1965)
283. Unknown Episode (21 May 1965)
284. Unknown Episode (24 May 1965)
285. Unknown Episode (25 May 1965)
286. Unknown Episode (26 May 1965)
287. Unknown Episode (27 May 1965)
288. Unknown Episode (28 May 1965)
289. Unknown Episode (31 May 1965)
290. Unknown Episode (1 June 1965)
291. Unknown Episode (2 June 1965)
292. Unknown Episode (3 June 1965)
293. Unknown Episode (4 June 1965)
294. Unknown Episode (7 June 1965)
295. Unknown Episode (8 June 1965)
296. Unknown Episode (9 June 1965)
297. Unknown Episode (10 June 1965)
298. Unknown Episode (11 June 1965)
299. Unknown Episode (14 June 1965)
300. Unknown Episode (15 June 1965)
301. Unknown Episode (16 June 1965)
302. Unknown Episode (17 June 1965)
303. Unknown Episode (18 June 1965)
304. Unknown Episode (21 June 1965)
305. Unknown Episode (22 June 1965)
306. Unknown Episode (23 June 1965)
307. Unknown Episode (24 June 1965)
308. Unknown Episode (25 June 1965)
309. Unknown Episode (28 June 1965)
310. Unknown Episode (29 June 1965)
311. Unknown Episode (30 June 1965)
312. Unknown Episode (1 July 1965)
313. Unknown Episode (2 July 1965)
314. Unknown Episode (5 July 1965)
315. Unknown Episode (6 July 1965)
316. Unknown Episode (7 July 1965)
317. Unknown Episode (8 July 1965)
318. Unknown Episode (9 July 1965)
319. Unknown Episode (12 July 1965)
320. Unknown Episode (13 July 1965)
321. Unknown Episode (14 July 1965)
322. Unknown Episode (15 July 1965)
323. Unknown Episode (16 July 1965)
324. Unknown Episode (19 July 1965)
325. Unknown Episode (20 July 1965)
326. Unknown Episode (21 July 1965)
327. Unknown Episode (22 July 1965)
328. Unknown Episode (23 July 1965)
329. Unknown Episode (26 July 1965)
330. Unknown Episode (27 July 1965)
331. Unknown Episode (28 July 1965)
332. Unknown Episode (29 July 1965)
333. Unknown Episode (30 July 1965)
334. Unknown Episode (2 August 1965)
335. Unknown Episode (3 August 1965)
336. Unknown Episode (4 August 1965)
337. Unknown Episode (5 August 1965)
338. Unknown Episode (6 August 1965)
339. Unknown Episode (9 August 1965)
340. Unknown Episode (10 August 1965)
341. Unknown Episode (11 August 1965)
342. Unknown Episode (12 August 1965)
343. Unknown Episode (13 August 1965)
344. Unknown Episode (16 August 1965)
345. Unknown Episode (17 August 1965)
346. Unknown Episode (18 August 1965)
347. Unknown Episode (19 August 1965)
348. Unknown Episode (20 August 1965)
349. Useful Box Day (23 August 1965)
350. Unknown Episode (24 August 1965)
351. Unknown Episode (25 August 1965)
352. Unknown Episode (26 August 1965)
353. Unknown Episode (27 August 1965)
354. Unknown Episode (30 August 1965)
355. Unknown Episode (31 August 1965)
356. Unknown Episode (1 September 1965)
357. Unknown Episode (2 September 1965)
358. Unknown Episode (3 September 1965)
359. Unknown Episode (6 September 1965)
360. Unknown Episode (7 September 1965)
361. Unknown Episode (8 September 1965)
362. Unknown Episode (9 September 1965)
363. Unknown Episode (10 September 1965)
364. Unknown Episode (13 September 1965)
365. Unknown Episode (14 September 1965)
366. Unknown Episode (15 September 1965)
367. Unknown Episode (16 September 1965)
368. Unknown Episode (17 September 1965)
369. Unknown Episode (20 September 1965)
370. Unknown Episode (21 September 1965)
371. Unknown Episode (22 September 1965)
372. Unknown Episode (23 September 1965)
373. Unknown Episode (24 September 1965)
374. Unknown Episode (27 September 1965)
375. Unknown Episode (28 September 1965)
376. Unknown Episode (29 September 1965)
377. Unknown Episode (30 September 1965)
378. Unknown Episode (1 October 1965)
379. Unknown Episode (4 October 1965)
380. Unknown Episode (5 October 1965)
381. Unknown Episode (6 October 1965)
382. Unknown Episode (7 October 1965)
383. Unknown Episode (8 October 1965)
384. Unknown Episode (11 October 1965)
385. Unknown Episode (12 October 1965)
386. Unknown Episode (13 October 1965)
387. Unknown Episode (14 October 1965)
388. Unknown Episode (15 October 1965)
389. Unknown Episode (18 October 1965)
390. Unknown Episode (19 October 1965)
391. Unknown Episode (20 October 1965)
392. Unknown Episode (21 October 1965)
393. Unknown Episode (22 October 1965)
394. Unknown Episode (25 October 1965)
395. Unknown Episode (26 October 1965)
396. Unknown Episode (27 October 1965)
397. Unknown Episode (28 October 1965)
398. Unknown Episode (29 October 1965)
399. Unknown Episode (1 November 1965)
400. Unknown Episode (2 November 1965)
401. Unknown Episode (3 November 1965)
402. Unknown Episode (4 November 1965)
403. Unknown Episode (5 November 1965)
404. Unknown Episode (8 November 1965)
405. Unknown Episode (9 November 1965)
406. Unknown Episode (10 November 1965)
407. Unknown Episode (11 November 1965)
408. Unknown Episode (12 November 1965)
409. Unknown Episode (15 November 1965)
410. Unknown Episode (16 November 1965)
411. Unknown Episode (17 November 1965)
412. Unknown Episode (18 November 1965)
413. Unknown Episode (19 November 1965)
414. Unknown Episode (22 November 1965)
415. Unknown Episode (23 November 1965)
416. Unknown Episode (24 November 1965)
417. Unknown Episode (25 November 1965)
418. Unknown Episode (26 November 1965)
419. Unknown Episode (29 November 1965)
420. Unknown Episode (30 November 1965)
421. Unknown Episode (1 December 1965)
422. Unknown Episode (2 December 1965)
423. Unknown Episode (3 December 1965)
424. Unknown Episode (6 December 1965)
425. Unknown Episode (7 December 1965)
426. Unknown Episode (8 December 1965)
427. Unknown Episode (9 December 1965)
428. Unknown Episode (10 December 1965)
429. Unknown Episode (13 December 1965)
430. Unknown Episode (14 December 1965)
431. Unknown Episode (15 December 1965)
432. Unknown Episode (16 December 1965)
433. Unknown Episode (17 December 1965)
434. Unknown Episode (20 December 1965)
435. Unknown Episode (21 December 1965)
436. Unknown Episode (22 December 1965)
437. Unknown Episode (23 December 1965)
438. Unknown Episode (24 December 1965)
439. Unknown Episode (27 December 1965)
440. Unknown Episode (28 December 1965)
441. Unknown Episode (29 December 1965)
442. Unknown Episode (30 December 1965)
443. Unknown Episode (31 December 1965)
444. Unknown Episode (3 January 1966)
445. Unknown Episode (4 January 1966)
446. Unknown Episode (5 January 1966)
447. Unknown Episode (6 January 1966)
448. Unknown Episode (7 January 1966)
449. Unknown Episode (10 January 1966)
450. Unknown Episode (11 January 1966)
451. Unknown Episode (12 January 1966)
452. Unknown Episode (13 January 1966)
453. Unknown Episode (14 January 1966)
454. Unknown Episode (17 January 1966)
455. Unknown Episode (18 January 1966)
456. Unknown Episode (19 January 1966)
457. Unknown Episode (20 January 1966)
458. Unknown Episode (21 January 1966)
459. Unknown Episode (24 January 1966)
460. Unknown Episode (25 January 1966)
461. Unknown Episode (26 January 1966)
462. Unknown Episode (27 January 1966)
463. Unknown Episode (28 January 1966)
464. Unknown Episode (31 January 1966)
465. Unknown Episode (1 February 1966)
466. Unknown Episode (2 February 1966)
467. Unknown Episode (3 February 1966)
468. Unknown Episode (4 February 1966)
469. Unknown Episode (7 February 1966)
470. Unknown Episode (8 February 1966)
471. Unknown Episode (9 February 1966)
472. Unknown Episode (10 February 1966)
473. Unknown Episode (11 February 1966)
474. Unknown Episode (14 February 1966)
475. Unknown Episode (15 February 1966)
476. Unknown Episode (16 February 1966)
477. Unknown Episode (17 February 1966)
478. Unknown Episode (18 February 1966)
479. Unknown Episode (21 February 1966)
480. Unknown Episode (22 February 1966)
481. Unknown Episode (23 February 1966)
482. Unknown Episode (24 February 1966)
483. Unknown Episode (25 February 1966)
484. Unknown Episode (28 February 1966)
485. Unknown Episode (1 March 1966)
486. Unknown Episode (2 March 1966)
487. Unknown Episode (3 March 1966)
488. Unknown Episode (4 March 1966)
489. Unknown Episode (7 March 1966)
490. Unknown Episode (8 March 1966)
491. Unknown Episode (9 March 1966)
492. Unknown Episode (10 March 1966)
493. Unknown Episode (11 March 1966)
494. Unknown Episode (14 March 1966)
495. Unknown Episode (15 March 1966)
496. Unknown Episode (16 March 1966)
497. Unknown Episode (17 March 1966)
498. Unknown Episode (18 March 1966)
499. Unknown Episode (21 March 1966)
500. Unknown Episode (22 March 1966)
501. Unknown Episode (23 March 1966)
502. Unknown Episode (24 March 1966)
503. Unknown Episode (25 March 1966)
504. Unknown Episode (28 March 1966)
505. Unknown Episode (29 March 1966)
506. Unknown Episode (30 March 1966)
507. Unknown Episode (31 March 1966)
508. Unknown Episode (1 April 1966)
509. Unknown Episode (4 April 1966)
510. Unknown Episode (5 April 1966)
511. Unknown Episode (6 April 1966)
512. Unknown Episode (7 April 1966)
513. Unknown Episode (8 April 1966)
514. Unknown Episode (11 April 1966)
515. Unknown Episode (12 April 1966)
516. Unknown Episode (13 April 1966)
517. Unknown Episode (14 April 1966)
518. Unknown Episode (15 April 1966)
519. Unknown Episode (18 April 1966)
520. Unknown Episode (19 April 1966)
521. Unknown Episode (20 April 1966)
522. Unknown Episode (21 April 1966)
523. Unknown Episode (22 April 1966)
524. Unknown Episode (25 April 1966)
525. Unknown Episode (26 April 1966)
526. Unknown Episode (27 April 1966)
527. Unknown Episode (28 April 1966)
528. Unknown Episode (29 April 1966)
529. Unknown Episode (2 May 1966)
530. Unknown Episode (3 May 1966)
531. Unknown Episode (4 May 1966)
532. Unknown Episode (5 May 1966)
533. Unknown Episode (6 May 1966)
534. Unknown Episode (9 May 1966)
535. Unknown Episode (10 May 1966)
536. Unknown Episode (11 May 1966)
537. Unknown Episode (12 May 1966)
538. Unknown Episode (13 May 1966)
539. Unknown Episode (16 May 1966)
540. Unknown Episode (17 May 1966)
541. Unknown Episode (18 May 1966)
542. Unknown Episode (19 May 1966)
543. Unknown Episode (20 May 1966)
544. Useful Box Day (23 May 1966)
545. Unknown Episode (24 May 1966)
546. Unknown Episode (25 May 1966)
547. Unknown Episode (26 May 1966)
548. Unknown Episode (27 May 1966)
549. Unknown Episode (30 May 1966)
550. Unknown Episode (31 May 1966)
551. Unknown Episode (1 June 1966)
552. Unknown Episode (2 June 1966)
553. Unknown Episode (3 June 1966)
554. Unknown Episode (6 June 1966)
555. Unknown Episode (7 June 1966)
556. Unknown Episode (8 June 1966)
557. Unknown Episode (9 June 1966)
558. Unknown Episode (10 June 1966)
559. Unknown Episode (13 June 1966)
560. Unknown Episode (14 June 1966)
561. Unknown Episode (15 June 1966)
562. Unknown Episode (16 June 1966)
563. Unknown Episode (17 June 1966)
564. Unknown Episode (20 June 1966)
565. Unknown Episode (21 June 1966)
566. Unknown Episode (22 June 1966)
567. Unknown Episode (23 June 1966)
568. Unknown Episode (24 June 1966)
569. Unknown Episode (27 June 1966)
570. Unknown Episode (28 June 1966)
571. Unknown Episode (29 June 1966)
572. Unknown Episode (30 June 1966)
573. Unknown Episode (1 July 1966)
574. Useful Box Day (4 July 1966)
575. Unknown Episode (5 July 1966)
576. Unknown Episode (6 July 1966)
577. Unknown Episode (7 July 1966)
578. Unknown Episode (8 July 1966)
579. Unknown Episode (11 July 1966)
580. Unknown Episode (12 July 1966)
581. Unknown Episode (13 July 1966)
582. Unknown Episode (14 July 1966)
583. Unknown Episode (15 July 1966)
584. Unknown Episode (18 July 1966)
585. Unknown Episode (19 July 1966)
586. Unknown Episode (20 July 1966)
587. Unknown Episode (21 July 1966)
588. Unknown Episode (22 July 1966)
589. Unknown Episode (25 July 1966)
590. Unknown Episode (26 July 1966)
591. Unknown Episode (27 July 1966)
592. Unknown Episode (28 July 1966)
593. Unknown Episode (29 July 1966)
594. Unknown Episode (1 August 1966)
595. Unknown Episode (2 August 1966)
596. Unknown Episode (3 August 1966)
597. Unknown Episode (4 August 1966)
598. Unknown Episode (5 August 1966)
599. Unknown Episode (8 August 1966)
600. Unknown Episode (9 August 1966)
601. Unknown Episode (10 August 1966)
602. Unknown Episode (11 August 1966)
603. Unknown Episode (12 August 1966)
604. Unknown Episode (15 August 1966)
605. Unknown Episode (16 August 1966)
606. Unknown Episode (17 August 1966)
607. Unknown Episode (18 August 1966)
608. Unknown Episode (19 August 1966)
609. Unknown Episode (22 August 1966)
610. Useful Box Day (23 August 1966)
611. Unknown Episode (24 August 1966)
612. Unknown Episode (25 August 1966)
613. Unknown Episode (26 August 1966)
614. Unknown Episode (29 August 1966)
615. Unknown Episode (30 August 1966)
616. Unknown Episode (31 August 1966)
617. Unknown Episode (1 September 1966)
618. Unknown Episode (2 September 1966)
619. Unknown Episode (5 September 1966)
620. Unknown Episode (6 September 1966)
621. Unknown Episode (7 September 1966)
622. Unknown Episode (8 September 1966)
623. Unknown Episode (9 September 1966)
624. Unknown Episode (12 September 1966)
625. Unknown Episode (13 September 1966)
626. Unknown Episode (14 September 1966)
627. Unknown Episode (15 September 1966)
628. Unknown Episode (16 September 1966)
629. Unknown Episode (19 September 1966)
630. Unknown Episode (20 September 1966)
631. Unknown Episode (21 September 1966)
632. Unknown Episode (22 September 1966)
633. Unknown Episode (23 September 1966)
634. Unknown Episode (26 September 1966)
635. Unknown Episode (27 September 1966)
636. Unknown Episode (28 September 1966)
637. Unknown Episode (29 September 1966)
638. Unknown Episode (30 September 1966)
639. Unknown Episode (3 October 1966)
640. Unknown Episode (4 October 1966)
641. Unknown Episode (5 October 1966)
642. Unknown Episode (6 October 1966)
643. Unknown Episode (7 October 1966)
644. Unknown Episode (10 October 1966)
645. Unknown Episode (11 October 1966)
646. Unknown Episode (12 October 1966)
647. Unknown Episode (13 October 1966)
648. Unknown Episode (14 October 1966)
649. Unknown Episode (17 October 1966)
650. Unknown Episode (18 October 1966)
651. Unknown Episode (19 October 1966)
652. Unknown Episode (20 October 1966)
653. Unknown Episode (21 October 1966)
654. Unknown Episode (24 October 1966)
655. Unknown Episode (25 October 1966)
656. Unknown Episode (26 October 1966)
657. Unknown Episode (27 October 1966)
658. Unknown Episode (28 October 1966)
659. Unknown Episode (31 October 1966)
660. Unknown Episode (1 November 1966)
661. Unknown Episode (2 November 1966)
662. Unknown Episode (3 November 1966)
663. Unknown Episode (4 November 1966)
664. Unknown Episode (7 November 1966)
665. Unknown Episode (8 November 1966)
666. Unknown Episode (9 November 1966)
667. Unknown Episode (10 November 1966)
668. Unknown Episode (11 November 1966)
669. Unknown Episode (14 November 1966)
670. Unknown Episode (15 November 1966)
671. Unknown Episode (16 November 1966)
672. Unknown Episode (17 November 1966)
673. Unknown Episode (18 November 1966)
674. Unknown Episode (21 November 1966)
675. Unknown Episode (22 November 1966)
676. Unknown Episode (23 November 1966)
677. Unknown Episode (24 November 1966)
678. Unknown Episode (25 November 1966)
679. Unknown Episode (28 November 1966)
680. Unknown Episode (29 November 1966)
681. Unknown Episode (30 November 1966)
682. Unknown Episode (1 December 1966)
683. Unknown Episode (2 December 1966)
684. Unknown Episode (5 December 1966)
685. Unknown Episode (6 December 1966)
686. Unknown Episode (7 December 1966)
687. Unknown Episode (8 December 1966)
688. Unknown Episode (9 December 1966)
689. Unknown Episode (12 December 1966)
690. Unknown Episode (13 December 1966)
691. Unknown Episode (14 December 1966)
692. Unknown Episode (15 December 1966)
693. Unknown Episode (16 December 1966)
694. Unknown Episode (19 December 1966)
695. Unknown Episode (20 December 1966)
696. Unknown Episode (21 December 1966)
697. Unknown Episode (22 December 1966)
698. Unknown Episode (23 December 1966)
699. Unknown Episode (26 December 1966)
700. Unknown Episode (27 December 1966)
701. Unknown Episode (28 December 1966)
702. Unknown Episode (29 December 1966)
703. Unknown Episode (30 December 1966)
704. Unknown Episode (2 January 1967)
705. Unknown Episode (3 January 1967)
706. Unknown Episode (4 January 1967)
707. Unknown Episode (5 January 1967)
708. Unknown Episode (6 January 1967)
709. Unknown Episode (9 January 1967)
710. Unknown Episode (10 January 1967)
711. Unknown Episode (11 January 1967)
712. Unknown Episode (12 January 1967)
713. Unknown Episode (13 January 1967)
714. Unknown Episode (16 January 1967)
715. Unknown Episode (17 January 1967)
716. Unknown Episode (18 January 1967)
717. Unknown Episode (19 January 1967)
718. Unknown Episode (20 January 1967)
719. Unknown Episode (23 January 1967)
720. Unknown Episode (24 January 1967)
721. Unknown Episode (25 January 1967)
722. Unknown Episode (26 January 1967)
723. Unknown Episode (27 January 1967)
724. Unknown Episode (30 January 1967)
725. Unknown Episode (31 January 1967)
726. Unknown Episode (1 February 1967)
727. Unknown Episode (2 February 1967)
728. Unknown Episode (3 February 1967)
729. Unknown Episode (6 February 1967)
730. Unknown Episode (7 February 1967)
731. Unknown Episode (8 February 1967)
732. Unknown Episode (9 February 1967)
733. Unknown Episode (10 February 1967)
734. Unknown Episode (13 February 1967)
735. Unknown Episode (14 February 1967)
736. Unknown Episode (15 February 1967)
737. Unknown Episode (16 February 1967)
738. Unknown Episode (17 February 1967)
739. Unknown Episode (20 February 1967)
740. Unknown Episode (21 February 1967)
741. Unknown Episode (22 February 1967)
742. Unknown Episode (23 February 1967)
743. Unknown Episode (24 February 1967)
744. Unknown Episode (27 February 1967)
745. Unknown Episode (28 February 1967)
746. Unknown Episode (1 March 1967)
747. Unknown Episode (2 March 1967)
748. Unknown Episode (3 March 1967)
749. Unknown Episode (6 March 1967)
750. Unknown Episode (7 March 1967)
751. Unknown Episode (8 March 1967)
752. Unknown Episode (9 March 1967)
753. Unknown Episode (10 March 1967)
754. Unknown Episode (13 March 1967)
755. Unknown Episode (14 March 1967)
756. Unknown Episode (15 March 1967)
757. Unknown Episode (16 March 1967)
758. Unknown Episode (17 March 1967)
759. Unknown Episode (20 March 1967)
760. Unknown Episode (21 March 1967)
761. Unknown Episode (22 March 1967)
762. Unknown Episode (23 March 1967)
763. Unknown Episode (24 March 1967)
764. Unknown Episode (27 March 1967)
765. Unknown Episode (28 March 1967)
766. Unknown Episode (29 March 1967)
767. Unknown Episode (30 March 1967)
768. Unknown Episode (31 March 1967)
769. Unknown Episode (3 April 1967)
770. Unknown Episode (4 April 1967)
771. Unknown Episode (5 April 1967)
772. Unknown Episode (6 April 1967)
773. Unknown Episode (7 April 1967)
774. Unknown Episode (10 April 1967)
775. Unknown Episode (11 April 1967)
776. Unknown Episode (12 April 1967)
777. Unknown Episode (13 April 1967)
778. Unknown Episode (14 April 1967)
779. Unknown Episode (17 April 1967)
780. Unknown Episode (18 April 1967)
781. Unknown Episode (19 April 1967)
782. Unknown Episode (20 April 1967)
783. Unknown Episode (21 April 1967)
784. Unknown Episode (24 April 1967)
785. Unknown Episode (25 April 1967)
786. Unknown Episode (26 April 1967)
787. Unknown Episode (27 April 1967)
788. Unknown Episode (28 April 1967)
789. Unknown Episode (1 May 1967)
790. Unknown Episode (2 May 1967)
791. Unknown Episode (3 May 1967)
792. Unknown Episode (4 May 1967)
793. Unknown Episode (5 May 1967)
794. Useful Box Day (8 May 1967)
795. Unknown Episode (9 May 1967)
796. Unknown Episode (10 May 1967)
797. Unknown Episode (11 May 1967)
798. Unknown Episode (12 May 1967)
799. Unknown Episode (15 May 1967)
800. Unknown Episode (16 May 1967)
801. Unknown Episode (17 May 1967)
802. Unknown Episode (18 May 1967)
803. Unknown Episode (19 May 1967)
804. Unknown Episode (22 May 1967)
805. Unknown Episode (23 May 1967)
806. Unknown Episode (24 May 1967)
807. Unknown Episode (25 May 1967)
808. Unknown Episode (26 May 1967)
809. Useful Box Day (29 May 1967)
810. Unknown Episode (30 May 1967)
811. Unknown Episode (31 May 1967)
812. Unknown Episode (1 June 1967)
813. Unknown Episode (2 June 1967)
814. Unknown Episode (5 June 1967)
815. Unknown Episode (6 June 1967)
816. Unknown Episode (7 June 1967)
817. Unknown Episode (8 June 1967)
818. Unknown Episode (9 June 1967)
819. Unknown Episode (12 June 1967)
820. Unknown Episode (13 June 1967)
821. Unknown Episode (14 June 1967)
822. Unknown Episode (15 June 1967)
823. Unknown Episode (16 June 1967)
824. Unknown Episode (19 June 1967)
825. Unknown Episode (20 June 1967)
826. Unknown Episode (21 June 1967)
827. Unknown Episode (22 June 1967)
828. Unknown Episode (23 June 1967)
829. Unknown Episode (26 June 1967)
830. Unknown Episode (27 June 1967)
831. Unknown Episode (28 June 1967)
832. Unknown Episode (29 June 1967)
833. Unknown Episode (30 June 1967)
834. Unknown Episode (3 July 1967)
835. Unknown Episode (4 July 1967)
836. Unknown Episode (5 July 1967)
837. Unknown Episode (6 July 1967)
838. Unknown Episode (7 July 1967)
839. Unknown Episode (10 July 1967)
840. Unknown Episode (11 July 1967)
841. Unknown Episode (12 July 1967)
842. Unknown Episode (13 July 1967)
843. Unknown Episode (14 July 1967)
844. Unknown Episode (17 July 1967)
845. Unknown Episode (18 July 1967)
846. Unknown Episode (19 July 1967)
847. Unknown Episode (20 July 1967)
848. Unknown Episode (21 July 1967)
849. Unknown Episode (24 July 1967)
850. Unknown Episode (25 July 1967)
851. Unknown Episode (26 July 1967)
852. Unknown Episode (27 July 1967)
853. Unknown Episode (28 July 1967)
854. Unknown Episode (31 July 1967)
855. Unknown Episode (1 August 1967)
856. Unknown Episode (2 August 1967)
857. Unknown Episode (3 August 1967)
858. Unknown Episode (4 August 1967)
859. Unknown Episode (7 August 1967)
860. Unknown Episode (8 August 1967)
861. Unknown Episode (9 August 1967)
862. Unknown Episode (10 August 1967)
863. Unknown Episode (11 August 1967)
864. Unknown Episode (14 August 1967)
865. Unknown Episode (15 August 1967)
866. Unknown Episode (16 August 1967)
867. Unknown Episode (17 August 1967)
868. Unknown Episode (18 August 1967)
869. Unknown Episode (21 August 1967)
870. Unknown Episode (22 August 1967)
871. Dressing Up Day (23 August 1967)
872. Unknown Episode (24 August 1967)
873. Unknown Episode (25 August 1967)
874. Unknown Episode (28 August 1967)
875. Unknown Episode (29 August 1967)
876. Unknown Episode (30 August 1967)
877. Unknown Episode (31 August 1967)
878. Unknown Episode (1 September 1967)
879. Unknown Episode (4 September 1967)
880. Unknown Episode (5 September 1967)
881. Unknown Episode (6 September 1967)
882. Unknown Episode (7 September 1967)
883. Unknown Episode (8 September 1967)
884. Unknown Episode (11 September 1967)
885. Unknown Episode (12 September 1967)
886. Unknown Episode (13 September 1967)
887. Unknown Episode (14 September 1967)
888. Unknown Episode (15 September 1967)
889. Unknown Episode (18 September 1967)
890. Unknown Episode (19 September 1967)
891. Unknown Episode (20 September 1967)
892. Unknown Episode (21 September 1967)
893. Unknown Episode (22 September 1967)
894. Unknown Episode (25 September 1967)
895. Unknown Episode (26 September 1967)
896. Unknown Episode (27 September 1967)
897. Unknown Episode (28 September 1967)
898. Unknown Episode (29 September 1967)
899. Unknown Episode (2 October 1967)
900. Unknown Episode (3 October 1967)
901. Unknown Episode (4 October 1967)
902. Unknown Episode (5 October 1967)
903. Unknown Episode (6 October 1967)
904. Unknown Episode (9 October 1967)
905. Unknown Episode (10 October 1967)
906. Unknown Episode (11 October 1967)
907. Unknown Episode (12 October 1967)
908. Unknown Episode (13 October 1967)
909. Unknown Episode (16 October 1967)
910. Dressing Up Day (17 October 1967)
911. Unknown Episode (18 October 1967)
912. Ideas Day (19 October 1967)
913. Unknown Episode (20 October 1967)
914. Useful Box Day (23 October 1967)
915. Unknown Episode (24 October 1967)
916. Unknown Episode (25 October 1967)
917. Unknown Episode (26 October 1967)
918. Unknown Episode (27 October 1967)
919. Unknown Episode (30 October 1967)
920. Unknown Episode (31 October 1967)
921. Unknown Episode (1 November 1967)
922. Unknown Episode (2 November 1967)
923. Unknown Episode (3 November 1967)
924. Unknown Episode (6 November 1967)
925. Unknown Episode (7 November 1967)
926. Unknown Episode (8 November 1967)
927. Unknown Episode (9 November 1967)
928. Science Day (10 November 1967)
929. Unknown Episode (13 November 1967)
930. Unknown Episode (14 November 1967)
931. Unknown Episode (15 November 1967)
932. Unknown Episode (16 November 1967)
933. Unknown Episode (17 November 1967)
934. Unknown Episode (20 November 1967)
935. Unknown Episode (21 November 1967)
936. Unknown Episode (22 November 1967)
937. Unknown Episode (23 November 1967)
938. Unknown Episode (24 November 1967)
939. Unknown Episode (27 November 1967)
940. Unknown Episode (28 November 1967)
941. Unknown Episode (29 November 1967)
942. Unknown Episode (30 November 1967)
943. Unknown Episode (1 December 1967)
944. Unknown Episode (4 December 1967)
945. Unknown Episode (5 December 1967)
946. Unknown Episode (6 December 1967)
947. Unknown Episode (7 December 1967)
948. Unknown Episode (8 December 1967)
949. Unknown Episode (11 December 1967)
950. Unknown Episode (12 December 1967)
951. Unknown Episode (13 December 1967)
952. Unknown Episode (14 December 1967)
953. Unknown Episode (15 December 1967)
954. Unknown Episode (18 December 1967)
955. Unknown Episode (19 December 1967)
956. Unknown Episode (20 December 1967)
957. Unknown Episode (21 December 1967)
958. Unknown Episode (22 December 1967)
959. Unknown Episode (25 December 1967)
960. Unknown Episode (26 December 1967)
961. Unknown Episode (27 December 1967)
962. Unknown Episode (28 December 1967)
963. Science Day (29 December 1967)
964. Science Day (22 March 1968)
965. Science Day (5 April 1968)
966. Science Day (19 April 1968)
967. Ideas Day (13 June 1968)
968. Ideas Day (20 June 1968)
969. Useful Box Day (1 July 1968)
970. Science Day (19 July 1968)
971. Ideas Day (24 October 1968)
972. Useful Box Day (11 November 1968)
973. Dressing Up Day (12 November 1968)
974. Ideas Day (12 December 1968)
975. Science Day (13 December 1968)
976. Science Day (3 January 1969)
977. Useful Box Day (10 February 1969)
978. Pets Day (18 June 1969)
979. Pets Day (9 July 1969)
980. Science Day (1 August 1969)
981. Science Day (15 August 1969)
982. Useful Box Day (15 September 1969)
983. Science Day (26 September 1969)
984. Dressing Up Day (2 December 1969)
985. Dressing Up Day (30 December 1969)
986. Ideas Day (19 March 1970)
987. Cuthbert and Bimbo (22 April 1970)
988. Ideas Day (28 May 1970)
989. The Fox and the Crow (6 August 1970)
990. Useful Box Day (28 September 1970)
991. Ideas Day (22 October 1970)
992. Dressing Up Day (8 December 1970)
993. Useful Box Day (28 December 1970)
994. A Surprise for the King (4 January 1971)
995. Pets Day (6 January 1971)
996. May I Bring a Friend? (18 January 1971)
997. Mr Josh Jolly and the Flag (26 January 1971)
998. Science Day (12 February 1971)
999. Pets Day (31 March 1971)
1000. Useful Box Day (5 April 1971)
1001. Useful Box Day (24 May 1971)
1002. Ideas Day (1 July 1971)
1003. Dressing Up Day (20 July 1971)
1004. Pets Day (4 August 1971)
1005. Ideas Day (19 August 1971)
1006. Dressing Up Day (24 August 1971)
1007. Pets Day (20 October 1971)
1008. Science Day (5 November 1971)
1009. Jeremy's Tree (10 January 1972)
1010. The King's Handkerchief (22 March 1972)
1011. Moonshine (13 April 1972)
1012. The Duck Pond (4 May 1972)
1013. Sam's Simple Song (27 September 1972)
1014. The Clown Who Forgot (24 October 1972)
1015. Going Shopping (7 November 1972)
1016. Abracadabra (13 November 1972)
1017. The Jumblies (16 November 1972)
1018. Make a Bigger Puddle Make a Smaller Worm (1 December 1972)
1019. The Quangle Wangle's Hat (29 January 1973)
1020. The Great Big Enormous Turnip (2 March 1973)
1021. Clouds (28 March 1973)
1022. When the King Wants to Sing (31 May 1973)
1023. A Way for Badgers (4 June 1973)
1024. Summer Holiday (6 June 1973)
1025. The Day the Town Hall Clock Caught Hiccups (3 September 1973)
1026. The Flowery Cow (10 September 1973)
1027. The Queen who Couldn't Sleep (25 September 1973)
1028. The Winding Road (1 October 1973)
1029. Jim and Jip (4 February 1974)
1030. The Emperor's New Clothes (2 April 1974)
1031. Please Keep Still! (16 April 1974)
1032. Mouse Trouble (26 June 1974)
1033. What is Summer? (1 July 1974)
1034. Joe's Bouncing Feet (9 July 1974)
1035. Archie and Auntie (7 October 1974)
1036. The Great Boffo (7 November 1974)
1037. Buttons or Bows? (18 November 1974)
1038. Quiet Please (22 November 1974)
1039. The Noisy House on the High Street (25 November 1974)
1040. A Day at Grandma's (16 December 1974)
1041. Farmer Flinder's Hat (28 January 1975)
1042. Clocks and More Clocks (5 February 1975)
1043. The Big Orange Thing (17 February 1975)
1044. Exploring Day (27 March 1975)
1045. Wrapping (23 April 1975)
1046. Bring a Breeze (15 May 1975)
1047. Mrs Toppledopple's New Hat (16 May 1975)
1048. Home for Slither (21 May 1975)
1049. The Sunflower Seed (6 August 1975)
1050. Our Friend the Wind (16 October 1975)
1051. Talkative Turtle (29 October 1975)
1052. Helpers (9 February 1976)
1053. Fox in Socks (12 May 1976)
1054. The Miller, the Boy and the Donkey (27 May 1976)
1055. The Man who Took the Indoors Out (8 October 1976)
1056. Don't Forget the Bacon! (22 October 1976)
1057. The Nickle Nackle Tree (16 November 1976)
1058. Mr Plum's Paradise (15 April 1977)
1059. Who Holds Up the Traffic? (26 May 1977)
1060. Horatio (7 July 1977)
1061. A Waiting Game (6 September 1977)
1062. Harlequin and the Gift of Many Colours (1 December 1977)
1063. Mr Bumble and Mr Boo (9 December 1977)
1064. What Sadie Sang (23 January 1978)
1065. Ivor Window Builds a House (20 February 1978)
1066. The Ball of String (25 April 1978)
1067. Kootenai Indians (19 May 1978)
1068. Jason's Trip to Market (5 June 1978)
1069. Circles (25 August 1978)
1070. The Tailor and the Giant (19 September 1978)
1071. Paul's Day in Bed (27 October 1978)
1072. The Cow who Fell in the Canal (25 June 1979)
1073. Augustus Grand Goes Out (10 September 1979)
1074. Clanky the Mechanical Boy (26 October 1979)
1075. Nini at Carnival (30 October 1979)
1076. The Lighthouse Keeper's Lunch (9 November 1979)
1077. Fun on the Farm with Numbers (19 November 1979)
1078. Bumpy Day (21 February 1980)
1079. The Brush Man (11 March 1980)
1080. Tinker, Tailor, Soldier, Sailor (21 April 1980)
1081. Mr Fox's Photographs (15 May 1980)
1082. Mrs Wobble the Waitress (16 May 1980)
1083. Mr Archimedes' Bath (6 June 1980)
1084. The Horse-drawn Barge from Kintbury, Berkshire (27 June 1980)
1085. The Little Rover (7 July 1980)
1086. Ho, Ho, Ho (15 July 1980)
1087. There's No Such Thing as a Dragon (17 July 1980)
1088. Sandcastles (22 July 1980)
1089. Albert the Albatross (23 July 1980)
1090. One-Eyed Jake (24 July 1980)
1091. The Sealion and the Slick (25 July 1980)
1092. A Pile of Clothes (31 July 1980)
1093. A Day by the Sea (4 August 1980)
1094. Sailing to Gold (8 August 1980)
1095. Alex's Bed (11 August 1980)
1096. Odd One Out (12 August 1980)
1097. Titimus Trim (13 August 1980)
1098. Hang On, the Other Phone's Ringing (14 August 1980)
1099. Be a Table, Be a Chair (15 August 1980)
1100. The Giant's Causeway (18 August 1980)
1101. The Leprechan's Goldby (20 August 1980)
1102. I'd like to buy... (22 August 1980)
1103. Maisie Blundell's Bus (25 August 1980)
1104. Family Picnic from South Cerney, Gloucestershire (26 August 1980)
1105. Door to Door (2 September 1980)
1106. Mushroom in the Rain (3 September 1980)
1107. Up, Over and Down (4 September 1980)
1108. A Wailing Game (8 September 1980)
1109. Harry Goes to a Fancy Dress Party (9 September 1980)
1110. How Long Does a Bubble Last? (11 September 1980)
1111. Humphrey, the Dancing Pig (16 September 1980)
1112. The Ugly Duckling (18 September 1980)
1113. Play School visits Bicton Park, East Devon (19 September 1980)
1114. I'd Like to Try Some Wimberry Pie (22 September 1980)
1115. Una Helps to Post a Letter (24 September 1980)
1116. 'Right,' said Fredby (25 September 1980)
1117. Mister Magnolia (16 December 1980)
1118. Peace at Last (23 January 1981)
1119. Where's Spot? (2 February 1981)
1120. Good Morning and Good Night (22 May 1981)
1121. The Kiwi's Wish (10 June 1981)
1122. The Beach (19 June 1981)
1123. Mr Josh Jolly Gives a Party (25 June 1981)
1124. Just Awful (2 July 1981)
1125. Question Mark (3 July 1981)
1126. A Pile of Clothes (6 July 1981)
1127. The King's Five Cooks Take a Holiday (17 July 1981)
1128. Too Much Noise (20 July 1981)
1129. Five Seagulls (24 July 1981)
1130. Dominik's Day Out (27 July 1981)
1131. One Hot Day (31 July 1981)
1132. Annabelle (4 August 1981)
1133. Bosie's Walk (5 August 1981)
1134. George, the Fire Engine (31 August 1981)
1135. The First Glove Puppet (1 September 1981)
1136. A look at puppets with Peter Garofalo (2 September 1981)
1137. The King's Collection (7 September 1981)
1138. Look (15 September 1981)
1139. The Wood Mouse (16 September 1981)
1140. Pinocchio (17 September 1981)
1141. Mr Blogg's Bridge (18 September 1981)
1142. Little Grey Cloud (22 September 1981)
1143. Me and My Flying Machine (9 October 1981)
1144. The Rhino and the Fairy (17 November 1981)
1145. The Mermaid and the Fisherman (18 November 1981)
1146. The Kindly Giant (19 November 1981)
1147. The Diddle Daddle Farmer (22 April 1982)
1148. The Lonely Skyscraper (3 May 1982)
1149. The Nurse and Her Family (18 May 1982)
1150. Explorers in the House (3 June 1982)
1151. Wynken, Blinken and Nod (4 June 1982)
1152. The Crocodile and the Dumper Truck (15 June 1982)
1153. Carnival Day (22 June 1982)
1154. Indian Two Feet and his Horseby (30 June 1982)
1155. Oscar on the Moon (2 July 1982)
1156. The Runaway Pizza (8 July 1982)
1157. Sally's Secret (12 July 1982)
1158. The Ants and the Grasshopper (14 July 1982)
1159. How the Csardas Was Invented (23 July 1982)
1160. The King and the Broom Maker (26 July 1982)
1161. William's Sandcastle (12 August 1982)
1162. Big, Brass Band (13 August 1982)
1163. Alex's Bed (16 August 1982)
1164. The Cow that Jumped Over the Moon (19 August 1982)
1165. Grandpa's Shiny Things (20 August 1982)
1166. The Grand Old Duke of York (23 August 1982)
1167. Benedict Finds a Home (1 September 1982)
1168. Present in a Jar (7 September 1982)
1169. Mr Ebenezer's Painful Gardening Day (8 September 1982)
1170. The Weatherwoman who Wanted to Please (17 September 1982)
1171. Sophie and Jack (22 November 1982)
1172. Farmer Parsnip Fireman (24 November 1982)
1173. The Sleepy Giant (26 November 1982)
1174. How Granny Found Her Smile Again (30 November 1982)
1175. The Vintage Car (3 December 1982)
1176. Richard (9 June 1983)
1177. King Duncan's Double Trouble (20 June 1983)
1178. The Silver Daisy (21 June 1983)
1179. The Chicken Book (27 June 1983)
1180. Bears on Wheels (14 July 1983)
1181. The Handy Shoe Shop (21 July 1983)
1182. Elmer the Elephant (10 August 1983)
1183. We Are Best Friends (20 September 1983)
1184. Goat for Sale (28 September 1983)
1185. The Line That Got the Bumps (29 September 1983)
1186. Jack and Nancy (14 October 1983)
1187. Rumbelow's Dance (2 December 1983)
1188. Uncle Fred the Parrot (11 January 1984)
1189. The King Gets Fit (13 February 1984)
1190. Miss Brick the Builder's Baby (11 May 1984)
1191. Grandmother Lucy Goes for a Picnic (25 May 1984)
1192. David's Grandfather (1 June 1984)
1193. An Elephant's Tale (6 June 1984)
1194. Goat at the Wedding (7 June 1984)
1195. The Stone Jar (18 August 1984)
1196. The Supermarket Mice (19 September 1984)
1197. The Waiting Game (21 September 1984)
1198. Ned and the Joybaloo (27 September 1984)
1199. Sam Goes to the Burrell (12 October 1984)
1200. One Night at a Time (30 October 1984)
1201. Farmer Parsnip Goes Deep sea Diving (30 April 1985)
1202. The King and the Canary (1 July 1985)
1203. The Chef Who Kept Cleaning his Kitchen (27 September 1985)
1204. Joseph's Other Red Sock (5 May 1986)
1205. Alfie Gives a Hand (9 June 1986)
1206. King Greenfingers's Disappointing Day (10 June 1986)
1207. Nosey Mrs Rat (11 June 1986)
1208. A Day When Frogs Wear Shoes (12 June 1986)
1209. Patrick and Michael (13 June 1986)
1210. The First Rains (24 June 1986)
1211. Tortoise's Dream (25 June 1986)
1212. Jilly You Look Terrible (8 July 1986)
1213. Jake (9 July 1986)
1214. Just the Trick (11 July 1986)
1215. Taken for a Ride (21 July 1986)
1216. Run Rabbit Run (22 July 1986)
1217. Stick in the Mud (23 July 1986)
1218. Just Rolling Along (24 July 1986)
1219. Mountain out of Molehills (25 July 1986)
1220. Where the River Begins (6 August 1986)
1221. Mick the Mess (12 August 1986)
1222. The Grogg's Day Out (15 August 1986)
1223. Mr Jumble's Secondhand Store (26 August 1986)
1224. The Comical Celtic Cat (28 August 1986)
1225. The Steam Train Crew (9 September 1986)
1226. Amber's Other Grandparents (20 October 1986)
1227. The Doorbell Rang (22 October 1986)
1228. Goat's Trail (5 May 1987)
1229. The Old Yellow Tractor (8 May 1987)
1230. Bumper the Dog (26 May 1987)
1231. Mr Podmore (1 June 1987)
1232. When Annabel was Rani for a Day (2 June 1987)
1233. Bird's New Shoes (3 June 1987)
1234. The Hat (4 June 1987)
1235. Jack and Jake (5 June 1887)
1236. Flatlands (16 June 1987)
1237. Tiger Runs (17 June 1987)
1238. Going on Holiday (18 June 1987)
1239. The Oak and the Reed (1 July 1987)
1240. Forget-me-not (13 July 1987)
1241. Katie Morag and the Big Boy Cousins (14 July 1987)
1242. The Pudding Like a Night on the Sea (17 July 1987)
1243. The Monster from Half-way to Nowhere (27 July 1987)
1244. The Supermarket Band (13 August 1987)
1245. Dogger (14 August 1987)
1246. Boxes (26 August 1987)
1247. Half Moon and One Whole Star (27 August 1987)
1248. The Sneezing Juggler (7 September 1987)
1249. Why Anna Hung Upside Down (8 September 1987)
1250. The Little Boy with a Secret (9 September 1987)
1251. The Birthday Football (10 September 1987)
1252. Bear Shadow (11 September 1987)
1253. New Clothes for Alex (21 September 1987)
1254. Anna's Secret Friend (22 September 1987)
1255. The New Baby (23 September 1987)
1256. The Big Sneeze (5 October 1987)
1257. The Giant's Wife (6 October 1987)
1258. Safe Sand (8 October 1987)
1259. Mrs Simpkin and the Magic Wheelbarrow (9 October 1987)
1260. The Midnight Farm (4 November 1987)
1261. And Miss Carter Wore Pink (26 January 1988)
1262. Toby's Treat (27 January 1988)
1263. A Visit from Victoria (28 January 1988)
1264. Mrs Armitage on Wheels (29 January 1988)
1265. Grandad's Muddle (9 September 1988)
1266. Wilfred Gordon McDonald Partridge (12 September 1988)

== See also ==
- Play Away
- Playdays
- Tikkabilla
- Show Me Show Me
- Play School (Australian TV series)
- Play School (New Zealand TV series)
- Polka Dot Door
- Zoom (1972 TV series)
- Mister Rogers' Neighborhood
- Captain Kangaroo
- Sesame Street
