= 2025–26 Liga 4 East Java =

2nd season of Liga 4 (Indonesia) provincial phase

Liga 4 East Java
- Season: 2025–2026
- Dates: 6 December 2025 – 15 February 2026
- Teams: 69
- Champions: Persepam (1st title)
- National phase: Persepam; Pasuruan United; Persid; Persinga; Persenga; Persikoba; PS Mojokerto Putra; Triple'S Kediri
- Biggest win: FC Pare 0–15 Persedikab (13 December 2025)
- Highest scoring: FC Pare 0–15 Persedikab (13 December 2025)

2025–26 Liga 4 East Java (also known as 2025–26 Liga 4 Kapal Api East Java Governor's Cup for sponsorship reason) is the second edition of the Liga 4 East Java region for men's football, and served as a qualifying round for the national phase of the 2025–26 Liga 4. The competition is organised by PSSI East Java provincial association.

== Teams ==
=== Teams changes ===
The following teams changed division after the 2024–25 season.

From Liga 4 East Java ▲ Promoted to Liga Nuantara Sang Maestro (Note: On 24 August 2025, Sang Maestro was acquired by Liga 4 side Persinab Nabire and took their place in Liga Nusantara with Persinab Sang Maestro as new name.)	To Liga 4 East Java ▼ Relegated from Liga Nusantara PSM Madiun

=== Participating teams ===
A total of 69 teams are competing in this season.

No.	Team	Location
1	Perseba	Bangkalan Regency
2	Baruna Nusantara	Banyuwangi Regency
3	Banyuwangi Putra	Banyuwangi Regency
4	Mitra Surabaya	Banyuwangi Regency
5	Perseta	Banyuwangi Regency
6	Persewangi	Banyuwangi Regency
7	Persikoba	Batu City
8	PSBK	Blitar City
9	Blitar Poetra	Blitar Regency
10	PSBI	Blitar Regency
11	Persebo 1964	Bondowoso Regency
12	Persebo Muda	Bondowoso Regency
13	Bojonegoro	Bojonegoro Regency
14	Persegres Putra	Gresik Regency
15	Persid	Jember Regency
16	Akor	Jombang Regency
17	PSID	Jombang Regency
18	Inter Kediri	Kediri City
19	FC Pare	Kediri Regency
20	Kediri United	Kediri Regency
21	Persedikab	Kediri Regency
22	Triple'S Kediri	Kediri Regency
23	Lamongan	Lamongan Regency
24	PSIL	Lumajang Regency
25	Madiun Putra	Madiun City
26	PSM	Madiun City
27	Persekama	Madiun Regency
28	Persemag	Magetan Regency
29	ASIFA	Malang City
30	Malang United	Malang City
31	Persema	Malang City
32	Blayu	Malang Regency
33	Persekam	Malang Regency
34	Sinar Mas^{1}	Malang Regency

No.	Team	Location
35	Gen-B	Mojokerto City
36	Persem	Mojokerto City
37	AC Majapahit	Mojokerto Regency
38	Mojokerto	Mojokerto Regency
39	Mojosari Putra	Mojokerto Regency
40	PS Mojokerto Putra	Mojokerto Regency
41	Nganjuk Ladang	Nganjuk Regency
42	Persenga	Nganjuk Regency
43	Persinga	Ngawi Regency
44	Perspa	Pacitan Regency
45	Persepam	Pamekasan Regency
46	Pasuruan United	Pasuruan City
47	Persekap	Pasuruan City
48	PSPK	Pasuruan City
49	Assyabaab Bangil	Pasuruan Regency
50	Putra Jaya^{2}	Pasuruan Regency
51	Persepon	Ponorogo Regency
52	PSHW	Ponorogo Regency
53	Hizbul Wathan	Sidoarjo Regency
54	Persida	Sidoarjo Regency
55	Sinar Harapan	Sidoarjo Regency
56	PSSS	Situbondo Regency
57	Perssu	Sumenep Regency
58	Arek Simo Putra	Surabaya City
59	Arek Suroboyo	Surabaya City
60	Bajul Ijo	Surabaya City
61	Banteng Jatim	Surabaya City
62	PS Kota Pahlawan	Surabaya City
63	Putra Mars^{3}	Surabaya City
64	Surabaya Muda	Surabaya City
65	Suryanaga Connection	Surabaya City
66	UNESA	Surabaya City
67	Bumi Wali	Tuban Regency
68	Persatu	Tuban Regency
69	Perseta 1970	Tulungagung Regency

Notes:

1. 2025 Liga 4 Malang Regency champions.
2. 2025 Liga 4 Pasuruan Regency champions.
3. 2025 Liga 4 Surabaya champions.

== Schedule ==
The schedule of the competition is as follows.

Round	Matchday	Date
First round	Matchday 1	6–8 & 11 December 2025
First round	Matchday 2	8–10 & 13 December 2025
First round	Matchday 3	10–12 & 15 December 2025
First round	Matchday 4	12–14 December 2025
First round	Matchday 5	13 & 15–16 December 2025
Second round	Matchday 1	4–5 January 2026
Second round	Matchday 2	6–7 January 2026
Second round	Matchday 3	8–9 January 2026
Third round	Matchday 1	19–20 January 2026
Third round	Matchday 2	21–22 January 2026
Third round	Matchday 3	23–24 January 2026
Fourth round	Matchday 1	TBA
Fourth round	Matchday 2	TBA
Fourth round	Matchday 3	TBA
Knockout round	Semi-final	TBA
Knockout round	Third place play-off	TBA
Knockout round	Final	TBA

== First round ==
The 69 teams will be drawn into 16 groups of four or five based on the geographical location of their homebase. The first round will be played in a home tournament format of single round-robin matches.

The top two teams of each group will qualify for the second round.

=== Group A ===
- All matches were held at Gelora Bung Sumardji Fied, Nganjuk.

Pos	Team	Pld	W	D	L	GF	GA	GD	Pts	Qualification
1	Persedikab Kediri	4	3	1	0	26	0	+26	10	Second round
2	Nganjuk Ladang (H)	4	3	1	0	11	2	+9	10	Second round
3	PSM Madiun	4	2	0	2	20	3	+17	6	
4	PSHW Ponorogo	4	1	0	3	4	27	−23	3	
5	FC Pare	4	0	0	4	1	30	−29	0	

Source: 2025–26 Liga 4 East Java
Rules for classification: 1) Points; 2) Head-to-head points; 3) Head-to-head goal difference; 4) Head-to-head goals scored; 5) Goal difference; 6) Goals scored; 7) Fair-play points; 8) Draw.
(H) Hosts

Matchday 1
6 December 2025
13:00

Persedikab Kediri	1–0	PSM Madiun
Hendra Aji 71'	Rep.

Gelora Bung Sumardji Fied, Nganjuk
6 December 2025
15:00

PSHW Ponorogo	3–1	FC Pare
Unknown 6', 52', 82'	Rep.	Unknown 62'

Gelora Bung Sumardji Fied, Nganjuk

Matchday 2
8 December 2025
13:00

FC Pare	0–4	Nganjuk Ladang
	Rep.	Unknown 9', 14', 32', 72'

Gelora Bung Sumardji Fied, Nganjuk
8 December 2025
15:00

PSHW Ponorogo	0–10	Persedikab Kediri
	Rep.	Unknown 9', 49', 54', 62', 66', 73', 76', 77', 78', 88'

Gelora Bung Sumardji Fied, Nganjuk

Matchday 3
10 December 2025
13:00

Nganjuk Ladang	5–1	PSHW Ponorogo
Dwiki Bagaskara 10'; Naufal Javier Hidayat 56'; Zulfikar Akhmad 84'; Unknown 53', 76'	Rep.	Unknown 26'

Gelora Bung Sumardji Fied, Nganjuk
10 December 2025
15:00

PSM Madiun	8–0	FC Pare
Muchammad Riski Saputro 11', 25'; Muhammad Arsy Syakaril Zulmy 39' (pen.), 54', 66'; Aldo Wahyu Pratama 46'; Ferdi Eka Saputra 64'; Hardindha Putra Buana 76'	Rep.

Gelora Bung Sumardji Fied, Nganjuk

Matchday 4
12 December 2025
13:00

PSM Madiun	11–0	PSHW Ponorogo
Dhana Alvin Amirudin 4'; Muchammad Riski Saputro 16', 54', 74', 88'; Eko Tri Prakoso 25'; Ferdi Eka Saputra 27'; Harris Adyatma Kartika Yudha 56'; Moh. Lutfi Hermawan 60'; Indra Cahya Saputra 76'; Jordion Reyner Zefanya Paat 87'	Rep.

Gelora Bung Sumardji Fied, Nganjuk
12 December 2025
15:00

Persedikab Kediri	0–0	Nganjuk Ladang
	Rep.

Gelora Bung Sumardji Fied, Nganjuk

Matchday 5
13 December 2025
13:00

FC Pare	0–15	Persedikab Kediri
	Rep.

Gelora Bung Sumardji Fied, Nganjuk
13 December 2025
15:00

Nganjuk Ladang	2–1	PSM Madiun
Shodik Achmad Fatoni 2'; Naufal Javier Hidayat 48'	Rep.	Muhammad Arsy Syakaril Zulmy 55'

Gelora Bung Sumardji Fied, Nganjuk

=== Group B ===
- All matches were held at ARG Soccer Field, Malang.

Pos	Team	Pld	W	D	L	GF	GA	GD	Pts	Qualification
1	Triple'S Kediri	3	3	0	0	8	2	+6	9	Second round
2	Persema Malang (H)	3	2	0	1	4	2	+2	6	Second round
3	Blayu	3	0	1	2	2	6	−4	1	
3	Mojosari Putra	3	0	1	2	2	6	−4	1	

Source: 2025–26 Liga 4 East Java
Rules for classification: 1) Points; 2) Head-to-head points; 3) Head-to-head goal difference; 4) Head-to-head goals scored; 5) Goal difference; 6) Goals scored; 7) Fair-play points; 8) Draw.
(H) Hosts

Matchday 1
8 December 2025
13:00

Blayu	1–3	Triple'S Kediri
Unknown 75'	Rep.	Ridho Nurdya Adhan 44'; Fahrul Rizqy Abidin 58'; Rafael Aldi 78'

ARG Soccer Field, Malang
8 December 2025
15:00

Persema Malang	2–0	Mojosari Putra
Muh. Nizar (?); Adrian (?)	Rep.

ARG Soccer Field, Malang

Matchday 2
10 December 2025
13:00

Mojosari Putra	1–1	Blayu
Unknown 22'	Rep.	Ganendra 24'

ARG Soccer Field, Malang
10 December 2025
15:00

Triple'S Kediri	2–0	Persema Malang
Fata Brilliantino 10'; Ridho Nurdya Adhan 81'	Rep.

ARG Soccer Field, Malang

Matchday 3
12 December 2025
13:00

Triple'S Kediri	3–1	Mojosari Putra
Andy Febyan 18'; Rendhi Adityas 54'; Hamdan Ibik 63'	Rep.	Unknown 58' (pen.)

ARG Soccer Field, Malang
12 December 2025
15:00

Persema Malang	2–0	Blayu
Ichlas Dwi Safaat 54' (pen.), 61'	Rep.

ARG Soccer Field, Malang

=== Group C ===
- Matches were held at Tuban Sport Center and Loka Jaya Stadium, Tuban.

Pos	Team	Pld	W	D	L	GF	GA	GD	Pts	Qualification
1	Perseta Batara	4	4	0	0	14	1	+13	12	Second round
2	Persatu Tuban (H)	4	2	1	1	8	3	+5	7	Second round
3	Bumi Wali	4	2	1	1	4	2	+2	7	
4	Bojonegoro	4	0	1	3	2	11	−9	1	
5	Lamongan	4	0	1	3	2	13	−11	1	

Source: 2025–26 Liga 4 East Java
Rules for classification: 1) Points; 2) Head-to-head points; 3) Head-to-head goal difference; 4) Head-to-head goals scored; 5) Goal difference; 6) Goals scored; 7) Fair-play points; 8) Draw.
(H) Hosts

Matchday 1
7 December 2025
15:00

Persatu Tuban	2–0	Bojonegoro
Iryanto Wandik 4', 13'	Rep.

Tuban Sport Center, Tuban
Attendance: 4.281
7 December 2025
19:00

Lamongan	0–5	Perseta Batara
	Rep.	Muhammad Alfin Putra Prakasa 9', 14', 18'; Jidan 28'; Bayu Arfian 43'

Tuban Sport Center, Tuban

Matchday 2
9 December 2025
13:00

Perseta Batara	6–0	Bojonegoro
Bayu Arfian 12', 34'; Muhammad Alfin Putra Prakasa 21', 37'; Mahdi Fatoni 51'; Adrian Putra Maulana 72'	Rep.

Tuban Sport Center, Tuban
9 December 2025
15:00

Bumi Wali	0–0	Persatu Tuban
	Rep.

Tuban Sport Center, Tuban

Matchday 3
11 December 2025
13:00

Lamongan	0–2	Bumi Wali
	Rep.	Sholakudin Nur Afida 11'; Bijahil Chalwa 53'

Tuban Sport Center, Tuban
11 December 2025
15:00

Persatu Tuban	1–2	Perseta Batara
Antok Mei Triyatmono 17'	Rep.	Bayu Arfian 14'; M. Thoriq Al Mundiri 43'

Tuban Sport Center, Tuban

Matchday 4
13 December 2025
13:00

Bojonegoro	1–1	Lamongan
Unknown 55'	Rep.	Unknown 29'

Tuban Sport Center, Tuban
13 December 2025
15:00

Perseta Batara	1–0	Bumi Wali
Muhammad Alfin Putra Prakasa 51' (pen.)	Rep.

Tuban Sport Center, Tuban

Matchday 5
15 December 2025
15:00

Bumi Wali	2–1	Bojonegor
	Rep.

Loka Jaya Stadium, Tuban
15 December 2025
15:00

Persatu Tuban	5–1	Lamongan
Rezza Maulana Fahrullah 2', 48', 64', 81'; Iryanto Wandik 18' (pen.)	Rep.	Mohammad Akbar Helfi Satrio 21'

Tuban Sport Center, Tuban
Referee: Farid (Gresik)

=== Group D ===
- All matches were held at R. Soedarsono Stadium, Pasuruan.

Pos	Team	Pld	W	D	L	GF	GA	GD	Pts	Qualification
1	Pasuruan United (H)	3	3	0	0	18	0	+18	9	Second round
2	Hizbul Wathan	3	1	1	1	3	6	−3	4	Second round
3	Surabaya Muda	3	1	1	1	2	9	−7	4	
4	PSPK Pasuruan	3	0	0	3	2	10	−8	0	

Source: 2025–26 Liga 4 East Java
Rules for classification: 1) Points; 2) Head-to-head points; 3) Head-to-head goal difference; 4) Head-to-head goals scored; 5) Goal difference; 6) Goals scored; 7) Fair-play points; 8) Draw.
(H) Hosts

Matchday 1
11 December 2025
13:00

PSPK Pasuruan	2–3	Hizbul Wathan
Muhammad Hidayat 19', 48' (pen.)	Rep.	Achmad Bilal 20', 53'; Muhammad Zidan 29'

R. Soedarsono Stadium, Pasuruan
11 December 2025
15:00

Pasuruan United	9–0	Surabaya Muda
Mochammad Rozak 7', 11', 68'; Ricko Hardiansyah 20', 27'; Muhammad Nur Haqiqi 21', 50'; Rosihan Rizqy Ramadhan 74'; M. Rahlil Ramadhan 87' (bd)	Rep.

R. Soedarsono Stadium, Pasuruan
Referee: Ipung Tri Cahyono (Malang)

Matchday 2
13 December 2025
13:00

Surabaya Muda	2–0	PSPK Pasuruan
M. Rahlil Ramadhan 67'; Andika Pratama 69'	Rep.

R. Soedarsono Stadium, Pasuruan
13 December 2025
15:00

Hizbul Wathan	0–4	Pasuruan United
	Rep.	Fran Adi Saputra 16'; Muhammad Bahykal Zidane 20' (bd); Muhammad Nur Haqiqi 26'; Ricko Hardiansyah 84'

R. Soedarsono Stadium, Pasuruan

Matchday 3
15 December 2025
13:00

Hizbul Wathan	0–0	Surabaya Muda
	Rep.

R. Soedarsono Stadium, Pasuruan
15 December 2025
15:00

Pasuruan United	5–0	PSPK Pasuruan
Noel Christian Huby 4', 10'; Muhammad Nur Haqiqi 40'; Ricko Hardiansyah 65'; Irfan Fikri Ardiansyah 89'	Rep.

R. Soedarsono Stadium, Pasuruan
Referee: Andika Fajar Darmawan (Banyuwangi)

=== Group E ===
- All matches were held at Gelora Bangkalan Stadium, Bangkalan.

Pos	Team	Pld	W	D	L	GF	GA	GD	Pts	Qualification
1	Perseba Bangkalan (H)	3	3	0	0	9	0	+9	9	Second round
2	Arek Simo Putra	3	2	0	1	3	2	+1	6	Second round
3	Persegres Putra	3	1	0	2	4	7	−3	3	
4	Bajul Ijo	3	0	0	3	0	7	−7	0	

Source: 2025–26 Liga 4 East Java
Rules for classification: 1) Points; 2) Head-to-head points; 3) Head-to-head goal difference; 4) Head-to-head goals scored; 5) Goal difference; 6) Goals scored; 7) Fair-play points; 8) Draw.
(H) Hosts

Matchday 1
7 December 2025
13:00

Persegres Putra	1–2	Arek Simo Putra
Muhammad Walidi 44' (pen.)	Rep.	Falach 41'; Slamet 78'

Gelora Bangkalan Stadium, Bangkalan
7 December 2025
15:00

Perseba Bangkalan	3–0	Bajul Ijo
Galang Saputra 12', 35'; Gustavo Ezernain 54'	Rep.

Gelora Bangkalan Stadium, Bangkalan

Matchday 2
9 December 2025
13:00

Bajul Ijo	0–3	Persegres Putra
	Rep.	M. Zainudin 79'; Unknown 51', 76'

Gelora Bangkalan Stadium, Bangkalan
9 December 2025
15:00

Arek Simo Putra	0–1	Perseba Bangkalan
	Rep.	Abu Rizal Maulana 90+2' (pen.)

Gelora Bangkalan Stadium, Bangkalan

Matchday 3
11 December 2025
13:00

Arek Simo Putra	1–0	Bajul Ijo
Unknown 21'	Rep.

Gelora Bangkalan Stadium, Bangkalan
11 December 2025
15:00

Perseba Bangkalan	5–0	Persegres Putra
Fadilah Akbar 6', 45+4', 66', 73'; Rendi Afida 57'	Rep.

Gelora Bangkalan Stadium, Bangkalan

=== Group F ===
- All matches were held at Untung Suropati Stadium, Pasuruan.

Pos	Team	Pld	W	D	L	GF	GA	GD	Pts	Qualification
1	Persekap Pasuruan (H)	4	4	0	0	27	0	+27	12	Second round
2	Putra Jaya Pasuruan	4	3	0	1	6	4	+2	9	Second round
3	Assyabaab Bangil	4	2	0	2	7	5	+2	6	
4	Suryanaga Connection	4	1	0	3	4	18	−14	3	
5	PSIL Lumajang	4	0	0	4	2	19	−17	0	

Source: 2025–26 Liga 4 East Java
Rules for classification: 1) Points; 2) Head-to-head points; 3) Head-to-head goal difference; 4) Head-to-head goals scored; 5) Goal difference; 6) Goals scored; 7) Fair-play points; 8) Draw.
(H) Hosts

Matchday 1
7 December 2025
13:00

Assyabaab Bangil	3–0	PSIL Lumajang
Unknown 20', 35', 90'	Rep.

Untung Suropati Stadium, Pasuruan
7 December 2025
15:00

Putra Jaya Pasuruan	2–0	Suryanaga Connection
Unknown 41', 45+1'	Rep.

Untung Suropati Stadium, Pasuruan

Matchday 2
9 December 2025
13:00

Suryanaga Connection	0–11	Persekap Pasuruan
	Rep.	Racksa Surya Wijaya 15', 34', 46', 48', 62'; Ahmad Fahrul Affandi 20'; Arvana Rohman Hakim 43', 45+1', 53'; Mukhammad Fahril Husaeni 74', 78'

Untung Suropati Stadium, Pasuruan
9 December 2025
15:00

Putra Jaya Pasuruan	1–0	Assyabaab Bangil
Unknown 16'	Rep.

Untung Suropati Stadium, Pasuruan

Matchday 3
11 December 2025
13:00

Persekap Pasuruan	3–0	Putra Jaya Pasuruan
Racksa Surya Wijaya 4'; Arie Cristiano 50'; Arvanda Rohman Hakim 81'	Rep.

Untung Suropati Stadium, Pasuruan
11 December 2025
15:00

PSIL Lumajang	1–4	Suryanaga Connection
Afif 20'	Rep.	Novaldo Ruswijaya Putra 47'; Indra Maulana Afriza 51'; Unknown 57', 68'

Untung Suropati Stadium, Pasuruan

Matchday 4
13 December 2025
13:00

PSIL Lumajang	1–3	Putra Jaya Pasuruan
Unknown 64' (pen.)	Rep.	Unknown 21', 41', 47'

Untung Suropati Stadium, Pasuruan
13 December 2025
15:00

Assyabaab Bangil	0–4	Persekap Pasuruan
	Rep.	Tegar Ilhansyah 32'; Arvanda Rohman Hakim 35'; Ariel Cristiano 52'; Racksa Surya Wijaya 54'

Untung Suropati Stadium, Pasuruan

Matchday 5
15 December 2025
13:00

Suryanaga Connection	0–4	Assyabaab Bangil
	Rep.	Unknown 44', 58', 71', 75'

Untung Suropati Stadium, Pasuruan
15 December 2025
15:00

Persekap Pasuruan	9–0	PSIL Lumajang
Arvanda Rohman Hakim 31', 63'; Achmad Fachrul Afandi 37', 52'; Khoirul Anwar 56'; Racksa Surya Wijaya 56', 66', 71'; Amir Machmud 86' (pen.)	Rep.

Untung Suropati Stadium, Pasuruan

=== Group G ===
- All matches were held at Ngronggo Sports Art Centre Field, Kediri.

Pos	Team	Pld	W	D	L	GF	GA	GD	Pts	Qualification
1	Perseta 1970	3	2	1	0	10	2	+8	7	Second round
2	Inter Kediri (H)	3	2	1	0	4	1	+3	7	Second round
3	Madiun Putra	3	1	0	2	6	7	−1	3	
4	Sinar Harapan	3	0	0	3	2	12	−10	0	

Source: 2025–26 Liga 4 East Java
Rules for classification: 1) Points; 2) Head-to-head points; 3) Head-to-head goal difference; 4) Head-to-head goals scored; 5) Goal difference; 6) Goals scored; 7) Fair-play points; 8) Draw.
(H) Hosts

Matchday 1
11 December 2025
13:00

Perseta 1970	6–0	Sinar Harapan
Andik Zulianto 45+1', 50'; Irwan Sapta Pamungkas 75'; Deaviendra Ananta Putra Dewanto 84'; Alfiando Firmansyah 87', 88'	Rep.

Ngronggo Sports Art Centre Field, Kediri
11 December 2025
15:00

Inter Kediri	2–0	Madiun Putra
Qischil Gandrum Minny 27'; Roger Bichario 42' (pen.)	Rep.

Ngronggo Sports Art Centre Field, Kediri

Matchday 2
13 December 2025
13:00

Madiun Putra	1–3	Perseta 1970
Faisal Baharuddin 4' (pen.)	Rep.	Andik Zulianto 33', 70'; Sandy Bayu 85'

Ngronggo Sports Art Centre Field, Kediri
13 December 2025
15:00

Sinar Harapan	0–1	Inter Kediri
	Rep.

Ngronggo Sports Art Centre Field, Kediri

Matchday 3
15 December 2025
13:00

Sinar Harapan	2–5	Madiun Putra
Muhammad Khoirul Setiawan 17', 27'	Rep.	Joko Tetuko 7'; Rizky Alexander Putra Airlangga 30'; Septi Randy 45+1', 72', 85'

Ngronggo Sports Art Centre Field, Kediri
15 December 2025
15:00

Inter Kediri	1–1	Perseta 1970
Enggie Ardian Saputra 10'	Rep.	Irwan Sapta Pamungkas 72'

Ngronggo Sports Art Centre Field, Kediri

=== Group H ===
- All matches were held at Jember Sport Garden Stadium, Jember.

Pos	Team	Pld	W	D	L	GF	GA	GD	Pts	Qualification
1	Persid Jember (H)	3	3	0	0	10	1	+9	9	Second round
2	Baruna Nusantara	3	1	1	1	8	3	+5	4	Second round
3	Persebo Muda Bondowoso	3	1	1	1	4	6	−2	4	
4	Banyuwangi Putra	3	0	0	3	2	14	−12	0	

Source: 2025–26 Liga 4 East Java
Rules for classification: 1) Points; 2) Head-to-head points; 3) Head-to-head goal difference; 4) Head-to-head goals scored; 5) Goal difference; 6) Goals scored; 7) Fair-play points; 8) Draw.
(H) Hosts

Matchday 1
11 December 2025
13:00

Banyuwangi Putra	2–3	Persebo Muda
Aditya Ilham 53', 66'	Rep.	M. Rizki Ramadhan 9'; Eka Hadi Firmansyah 35'; Ayub Saifullah 47'

Jember Sport Garden Stadium, Jember
11 December 2025
15:00

Persid Jember	2–1	Baruna Nusantara
Ghifari Vaiz Aditya 17'; Muhammad Chois Atoillah 51'	Rep.	Eko Wahyudi 35'

Jember Sport Garden Stadium, Jember

Matchday 2
13 December 2025
13:00

Baruna Nusantara	6–0	Banyuwangi Putra
Bathsya Dewa Aprilliano 27'; Eko Wahyudi 45+1', 59', 63'; Yogi Indra Ramadhan pada 72'; Galih Damai Saputra 79'	Rep.

Jember Sport Garden Stadium, Jember
13 December 2025
15:00

Persebo Muda	0–3	Persid Jember
	Rep.	Muhammad Rangga 3'; Ajudya Eka Kurniawan 11'; Ghifari Vaiz Aditya 13'

Jember Sport Garden Stadium, Jember

Matchday 3
15 December 2025
13:00

Persebo Muda	1–1	Baruna Nusantara
Suryadi Setiawan 71'	Rep.	Bathsya Dewa Aprilliano 50'

Jember Sport Garden Stadium, Jember
Referee: Rendi Wahyu (Batu)
15 December 2025
15:00

Persid Jember	5–0	Banyuwangi Putra
Muhammad Chois Attoillah 8'; Sahar Tehupelasury 13', 90+1'; Mohammad Hunaifi Azizi Hidayatullah 43'; Dadang Kurnia Fajri 63'	Rep.

Jember Sport Garden Stadium, Jember

=== Group I ===
- All matches were held at Gelora Brantas Stadium, Batu.

Pos	Team	Pld	W	D	L	GF	GA	GD	Pts	Qualification
1	Persikoba Batu (H)	3	3	0	0	14	0	+14	9	Second round
2	AC Majapahit	3	1	1	1	3	3	0	4	Second round
3	Sinar Mas Malang	3	1	1	1	4	13	−9	4	
4	PSBK Blitar	3	0	0	3	4	9	−5	0	

Source: 2025–26 Liga 4 East Java
Rules for classification: 1) Points; 2) Head-to-head points; 3) Head-to-head goal difference; 4) Head-to-head goals scored; 5) Goal difference; 6) Goals scored; 7) Fair-play points; 8) Draw.
(H) Hosts

Matchday 1
11 December 2025
13:00

AC Majapahit	3–1	PSBK Blitar
Muhammad Zaed Maulana Abdullah 45+1'; Alung S. Dika 64'; Jamal 85'	Rep.	Ahmad Zainul Arif 78'

Gelora Brantas Stadium, Batu
11 December 2025
15:00

Persikoba Batu	10–0	Sinar Mas Malang
Radhe Robert Octaviano 7', 17', 48'; Muhammad Gilang Ramadhan 37'; Muhammad Ilham Amin 75'; Unknown 45+1', 59', 65', 72', 84'	Rep.

Gelora Brantas Stadium, Batu

Matchday 2
13 December 2025
13:00

Sinar Mas Malang	0–0	AC Majapahit
	Rep.

Gelora Brantas Stadium, Batu
13 December 2025
15:00

PSBK Blitar	0–2	Persikoba Batu
	Rep.	Radhe Robert Octaviano 8', 44'

Gelora Brantas Stadium, Batu

Matchday 3
15 December 2025
13:00

PSBK Blitar	3–4	Sinar Mas Malang
Ahmad Zainul Arif 59'; Lutfi Adi Saputro 77'; Rayhan Firmansyah 90+1'	Rep.	Wildan Nabil Pribadi 21'; Tri Wahyudi 46', 88'; Lutfi Adi Sapto 65'

Gelora Brantas Stadium, Batu
15 December 2025
15:00

Persikoba Batu	2–0	AC Majapahit
Alvian Eka Pratama 48'; Muhammad Gilang Ramadhan 75' (pen.)	Rep.

Gelora Brantas Stadium, Batu

=== Group J ===
- All matches were held at Gelora Ratu Pamelingan Stadium, Pamekasan.

Pos	Team	Pld	W	D	L	GF	GA	GD	Pts	Qualification
1	Persepam Pamekasan (H)	3	3	0	0	8	0	+8	9	Second round
2	UNESA	3	2	0	1	6	2	+4	6	Second round
3	Perssu Madura City	3	1	0	2	2	6	−4	3	
4	Banteng Jatim	3	0	0	3	1	9	−8	0	

Source: 2025–26 Liga 4 East Java
Rules for classification: 1) Points; 2) Head-to-head points; 3) Head-to-head goal difference; 4) Head-to-head goals scored; 5) Goal difference; 6) Goals scored; 7) Fair-play points; 8) Draw.
(H) Hosts

Matchday 1
11 December 2025
13:00

Perssu Madura City	2–0	Banteng Jatim
Misbahurrahman 78'; Ferdi 86'	Rep.

Gelora Ratu Pamelingan Stadium, Pamekasan
11 December 2025
15:00

Persepam Pamekasan	1–0	UNESA
Adam Anis 10' (pen.)	Rep.

Gelora Ratu Pamelingan Stadium, Pamekasan

Matchday 2
13 December 2025
13:00

UNESA	2–0	Perssu Madura City
Firstno Brama Putra 21'; Yudha Bagus Prasetya 87' (pen.)	Rep.

Gelora Ratu Pamelingan Stadium, Pamekasan
13 December 2025
15:00

Banteng Jatim	0–3	Persepam Pamekasan
	Rep.	I Gusti Dewa Agung Vintara 3'; Adam Anis 64' (pen.); Mustaghfir 68'

Gelora Ratu Pamelingan Stadium, Pamekasan

Matchday 3
15 December 2025
13:00

Banteng Jatim	1–4	UNESA
Imas Tri Pamungkas 39' (bd)	Rep.	Imas Tri Pamungkas 13'; Ahmad Dheni 23'; Yudha Bagus Prasetya 60'; Firstno Brama Putra 89'

Gelora Ratu Pamelingan Stadium, Pamekasan
15 December 2025
15:00

Persepam Pamekasan	4–0	Perssu Madura City
Fahmi Maulidi Rohman 1'; Adam Anis 16', 60'; I Gusti Dewa Agung Vintara 57'	Rep.

Gelora Ratu Pamelingan Stadium, Pamekasan

=== Group K ===
- All matches were held at Diponegoro Stadium, Banyuwangi.

Pos	Team	Pld	W	D	L	GF	GA	GD	Pts	Qualification
1	Persewangi Banyuwangi (H)	3	3	0	0	5	0	+5	9	Second round
2	PSSS Situbondo	3	2	0	1	4	3	+1	6	Second round
3	Persebo 1964	3	1	0	2	3	6	−3	3	
4	Mitra Surabaya	3	0	0	3	2	5	−3	0	

Source: 2025–26 Liga 4 East Java
Rules for classification: 1) Points; 2) Head-to-head points; 3) Head-to-head goal difference; 4) Head-to-head goals scored; 5) Goal difference; 6) Goals scored; 7) Fair-play points; 8) Draw.
(H) Hosts

Matchday 1
11 December 2025
13:00

Mitra Surabaya	1–2	Persebo 1964
Iwan Sampurno 77'	Rep.	Mohamad Ega Kurniawan 45'; Hafis Kafit 58'

Diponegoro Stadium, Banyuwangi
11 December 2025
15:00

Persewangi Banyuwangi	1–0	PSSS Situbondo
Syahrul Reza Mugi Rahayu 25'	Rep.

Diponegoro Stadium, Banyuwangi
Referee: Nur Salim (Kota Probolinggo)

Matchday 2
13 December 2025
13:00

PSSS Situbondo	2–1	Mitra Surabaya
Ahmad Amin Agusti 13'; Anang Makruf 27'	Rep.	Mohamad Rafila 57'

Diponegoro Stadium, Banyuwangi
13 December 2025
15:00

Persebo 1964	0–3	Persewangi Banyuwangi
	Rep.	Bayu Mahardika 37'; Anis Mujiono 43'; Teddy Galih 48'

Diponegoro Stadium, Banyuwangi

Matchday 3
15 December 2025
13:00

Persebo 1964	1–2	PSSS Situbondo
Muhammad Samsul Arifin 74'	Rep.	Joko Ari Susanto 4'; Hafid Tamari 61'

Diponegoro Stadium, Banyuwangi
15 December 2025
15:00

Persewangi Banyuwangi	1–0	Mitra Surabaya
Surya Budi Prasetyo 30'	Rep.

Diponegoro Stadium, Banyuwangi

=== Group L ===
- All matches were held at Kahuripan Stadium, Malang.

Pos	Team	Pld	W	D	L	GF	GA	GD	Pts	Qualification
1	Persekam Malang (H)	3	2	1	0	14	2	+12	7	Second round
2	Malang United	3	1	1	1	8	4	+4	4	Second round
3	Kediri United	3	1	0	2	3	10	−7	3 (Note: Head-to-head results: Kediri United 3–2 ASIFA.)	
4	ASIFA	3	1	0	2	4	13	−9	3	

Source: 2025–26 Liga 4 East Java
Rules for classification: 1) Points; 2) Head-to-head points; 3) Head-to-head goal difference; 4) Head-to-head goals scored; 5) Goal difference; 6) Goals scored; 7) Fair-play points; 8) Draw.
(H) Hosts
Notes:

Matchday 1
11 December 2025
13:00

Kediri United	3–2	ASIFA
Unknown 38', 89', 90+5'	Rep.	Aji Dian 29'; Unknown 43'

Kahuripan Stadium, Malang
11 December 2025
15:00

Persekam Malang	2–2	Malang United
Korneles Howay 38', 81' (pen.)	Rep.	Unknown 35' (pen.), 65'

Kahuripan Stadium, Malang

Matchday 2
13 December 2025
13:00

Malang United	5–0	Kediri United
Unknown 14', 17', 29', 46', 69'	Rep.

Kahuripan Stadium, Malang
13 December 2025
15:00

ASIFA	0–9	Persekam Malang
	Rep.	Korneles Howay; Sunandar Beni Jatmiko; Fajar Hady Mulyo; Dicky Budi Kurniawan

Kahuripan Stadium, Malang

Matchday 3
15 December 2025
13:00

ASIFA	2–1	Malang United
Unknown 1', 4'	Rep.	Unknown 10'

Kahuripan Stadium, Malang
15 December 2025
15:00

Persekam Malang	3–0	Kediri United
Unknown 15', 54', 68'	Rep.

Kahuripan Stadium, Malang

=== Group M ===
- All matches were held at Batoro Katong Stadium, Ponorogo.

Pos	Team	Pld	W	D	L	GF	GA	GD	Pts	Qualification
1	Persinga Ngawi	3	2	1	0	5	3	+2	7	Second round
2	Persepon Ponorogo (H)	3	1	2	0	5	4	+1	5	Second round
3	Persemag Magetan	3	1	1	1	5	2	+3	4	
4	Perspa Pacitan	3	0	0	3	2	8	−6	0	

Source: 2025–26 Liga 4 East Java
Rules for classification: 1) Points; 2) Head-to-head points; 3) Head-to-head goal difference; 4) Head-to-head goals scored; 5) Goal difference; 6) Goals scored; 7) Fair-play points; 8) Draw.
(H) Hosts

Matchday 1
11 December 2025
13:00

Persinga Ngawi	2–1	Persemag Magetan
Zeri Alfindo Sembiring 41'; Rizky Sena Eka Pradana 64'	Rep.	Putra Nathan Jabriel Adista 61'

Batoro Katong Stadium, Ponorogo
11 December 2025
15:00

Persepon Ponorogo	3–2	Perspa Pacitan
Mei Handoko Prasetyo 16'; Ahmad Haikal Rabbani 77'; Ali Mustofa 83'	Rep.	Al Riza Amar Ma'ruf 25'; Afinda Ervan Habibullah 35'

Batoro Katong Stadium, Ponorogo

Matchday 2
13 December 2025
13:00

Perspa Pacitan	0–1	Persinga Ngawi
	Rep.	Rizky Sena Eka Pradana 45+2'

Batoro Katong Stadium, Ponorogo
13 December 2025
15:00

Persemag Magetan	0–0	Persepon Ponorogo
	Rep.

Batoro Katong Stadium, Ponorogo

Matchday 3
15 December 2025
13:00

Persemag Magetan	4–0	Perspa Pacitan
Rio Fardiansyah 11', 63'; Sidik Nugroho 66'; Harist Luqmanul 79'	Rep.

Batoro Katong Stadium, Ponorogo
15 December 2025
15:00

Persepon Ponorogo	2–2	Persinga Ngawi
Ali Mustofa 58'; Abdul Aziz 68'	Rep.	Rizky Sena Eka Pradana 33'; Yuda Wisnu Purnama 50'

Batoro Katong Stadium, Ponorogo

=== Group N ===
- All matches were held at 503 Raider Infantry Battalion Field, Mojokerto.

Pos	Team	Pld	W	D	L	GF	GA	GD	Pts	Qualification
1	PS Mojokerto Putra (H)	4	4	0	0	24	0	+24	12	Second round
2	Akor Jombang	4	2	1	1	10	4	+6	7	Second round
3	Persekama Madiun	4	1	2	1	8	7	+1	5	
4	Mojokerto	4	1	1	2	4	14	−10	4	
5	Gen-B Mojokerto	4	0	0	4	3	24	−21	0	

Source: 2025–26 Liga 4 East Java
Rules for classification: 1) Points; 2) Head-to-head points; 3) Head-to-head goal difference; 4) Head-to-head goals scored; 5) Goal difference; 6) Goals scored; 7) Fair-play points; 8) Draw.
(H) Hosts

Matchday 1
7 December 2025
13:00

Akor Jombang	3–0	Gen-B Mojokerto
Wongso Aji 34' (pen.), 62'; Ragil Setiawan 45+3'	Rep.

503 Raider Infantry Battalion Field, Mojokerto
7 December 2025
15:00

Mojokerto	1–1	Persekama Madiun
Raka Aditya Wisnu Wardana 34' (pen.)	Rep.	Alfian Roby 90+2' (pen.)

503 Raider Infantry Battalion Field, Mojokerto

Matchday 2
10 December 2025
13:00

Persekama Madiun	0–3	PS Mojokerto Putra
	Rep.	Hasbiyanto 2'; Didit Agus Yulianto 34'; Vikrian Akbar Fathoni 77'

503 Raider Infantry Battalion Field, Mojokerto
10 December 2025
15:00

Mojokerto	1–6	Akor Jombang
Unknown 61' (pen.)	Rep.	Unknown 34', 45+2', 69', 71', 74', 80'

503 Raider Infantry Battalion Field, Mojokerto

Matchday 3
12 December 2025
13:00

PS Mojokerto Putra	6–0	Mojokerto
Didit Agus Yulianto 14'; Muhammad Rizky 55'; Hasbiyanto 74', 81'; Achmad Rizal Setiawan 77'; Muhammad Izzul Haq 79'	Rep.

503 Raider Infantry Battalion Field, Mojokerto
12 December 2025
15:00

Gen-B Mojokerto	2–6	Persekama Madiun
Nurul Huda 23', 80'	Rep.	M. Abyan 4' (bd); Isnaini Lutfi 16', 76'; Alfian Roby 32'; Dhafa Riyanto 43'; M. Ficky 44'

503 Raider Infantry Battalion Field, Mojokerto

Matchday 4
14 December 2025
13:00

Gen-B Mojokerto	1–2	Mojokerto
	Rep.

503 Raider Infantry Battalion Field, Mojokerto
14 December 2025
15:00

Akor Jombang	0–2	PS Mojokerto Putra
	Rep.	Hasbiyanto 44'; Adam Jordi 88'

503 Raider Infantry Battalion Field, Mojokerto

Matchday 5
16 December 2025
13:00

Persekama Madiun	1–1	Akor Jombang
	Rep.

503 Raider Infantry Battalion Field, Mojokerto
16 December 2025
15:00

PS Mojokerto Putra	13–0	Gen-B Mojokerto
Bimo Ryko Saputro 5'; Rendy Setiawan 20' (pen.), 30', 36', 70'; Adam Jordi 22', 40'; Moh. Nasrul Arifin 34', 52'; Rico Nurcahyo 47'; Hasbiyanto 59', 73'; Muhammad Rizky 90'	Rep.

503 Raider Infantry Battalion Field, Mojokerto

=== Group O ===
- All matches were held at Jala Krida Stadium, Surabaya.

Pos	Team	Pld	W	D	L	GF	GA	GD	Pts	Qualification
1	Persida Sidoarjo	4	4	0	0	23	0	+23	12	Second round
2	PSID Jombang	4	3	0	1	7	5	+2	9	Second round
3	PS Kota Pahlawan (H)	4	2	0	2	9	7	+2	6	
4	Persem Mojokerto	4	0	1	3	1	12	−11	1	
5	Putra Mars Surabaya	4	0	1	3	4	20	−16	1	

Source: 2025–26 Liga 4 East Java
Rules for classification: 1) Points; 2) Head-to-head points; 3) Head-to-head goal difference; 4) Head-to-head goals scored; 5) Goal difference; 6) Goals scored; 7) Fair-play points; 8) Draw.
(H) Hosts

Matchday 1
7 December 2025
13:00

Persem Mojokerto	0–1	PSID Jombang
	Rep.	Rohmad Ali Muazzam 45+3'

Jala Krida Stadium, Surabaya
7 December 2025
15:00

Putra Mars Surabaya	0–10	Persida Sidoarjo
	Rep.	Aldi Setya Wicaksono 11', 19'; Sandy Kusuma Triandy 28'; M. Rizki Ramadan 36'; Mochammad Alex Sandro 48', 52', 69'; Ridwan Pri Handoko 51'; Achmad Riza Afis Uddin 56'; Miko Ari Santo 81'

Jala Krida Stadium, Surabaya

Matchday 2
9 December 2025
13:00

Persida Sidoarjo	4–0	PS Kota Pahlawan
Ridwan Pri Handoko 29', 34'; Achmad Riza Afis Uddin 51'; Mochammad Alex Sandro 54'	Rep.

Jala Krida Stadium, Surabaya
9 December 2025
15:00

Putra Mars Surabaya	1–1	Persem Mojokerto
68'	Rep.	Fairus Zabadi 84' (pen.)

Jala Krida Stadium, Surabaya

Matchday 3
11 December 2025
13:00

PS Kota Pahlawan	5–1	Putra Mars Surabaya
Naga Saputra 58' (pen.), 63'; Muhammad Fikri Syahrul Ramadhan 70', 74'; Anwar Nabil Widhi Nur Ridho 84'	Rep.	Ruben Davi Anggoro 36'

Jala Krida Stadium, Surabaya
11 December 2025
15:00

PSID Jombang	0–3	Persida Sidoarjo
	Rep.	Mochammad Alex Sandro 45'; Ridwan Pri Handoko 80'; Achmad Riza Afis Uddin 85'

Jala Krida Stadium, Surabaya

Matchday 4
13 December 2025
13:00

PSID Jombang	4–2	Putra Mars Surabaya
Rohmad Ali Muazzam 34'; Muhammad Syurrudin 48'; Didit Febrianto 55'; Rendi Cahya Saputra 85'	Rep.	Muhammad Izzul 5'; Roby Juliansyah 38'

Jala Krida Stadium, Surabaya
13 December 2025
15:00

Persem Mojokerto	0–4	PS Kota Pahlawan
	Rep.	Muhammad Fikri Syahrul Ramadhan 54'; Kamaruzzaman 65'; Naga Saputra 90'; Unknown 63'

Jala Krida Stadium, Surabaya

Matchday 5
15 December 2025
13:00

Persida Sidoarjo	6–0	Persem Mojokerto
Ridwan Pri Handoko 7', 20', 44'; Almahi As Shiddiq 36'; Miko Ari Santoso 41', 52'	Rep.

Jala Krida Stadium, Surabaya
15 December 2025
15:00

PS Kota Pahlawan	0–2	PSID Jombang
	Rep.	Unknown 47', 62'

Jala Krida Stadium, Surabaya

=== Group P ===
- All matches were held at Gelora Panataran Stadium, Blitar.

Pos	Team	Pld	W	D	L	GF	GA	GD	Pts	Qualification
1	Persenga Nganjuk	3	3	0	0	10	1	+9	9	Second round
2	PSBI Blitar (H)	3	2	0	1	8	3	+5	6	Second round
3	Blitar Poetra	3	0	1	2	2	9	−7	1	
4	Arek Suroboyo (Note: Arek Suroboyo were penalized with a three-point deduction after their match against Persenga Nganjuk was declared a walkover loss following a decision by the disciplinary committee.)	3	0	1	2	3	10	−7	−2	

Source: 2025–26 Liga 4 East Java
Rules for classification: 1) Points; 2) Head-to-head points; 3) Head-to-head goal difference; 4) Head-to-head goals scored; 5) Goal difference; 6) Goals scored; 7) Fair-play points; 8) Draw.
(H) Hosts
Notes:

Matchday 1
11 December 2025
13:00

Persenga Nganjuk	3–0 (w/o)	Arek Suroboyo
	Rep.

Gelora Panataran Stadium, Blitar
11 December 2025
15:00

PSBI Blitar	2–0	Blitar Poetra
Ridwan Candra Widyatmoko 42'; Muhammad Alfin Aulia Rahman 90'	Rep.

Gelora Panataran Stadium, Blitar

Matchday 2
13 December 2025
13:00

Blitar Poetra	0–5	Persenga Nganjuk
	Rep.	Kristiyono 16', 42'; Nasikin Nur Miftah 36'; Koko Dwi Anggara 50'; Ichsan Hari Kurniawan 82'

Gelora Panataran Stadium, Blitar
13 December 2025
15:00

Arek Suroboyo	1–5	PSBI Blitar
Muhammad Azmi 41'	Rep.	Muhammad Alfin Aulia Rahman 22'; Muhammad Gufron 35'; Akbar Khairat Ajiseno 55', 63'; Bima Firnanda Oktaviano Ramadhan 77'

Gelora Panataran Stadium, Blitar

Matchday 3
15 December 2025
13:00

Arek Suroboyo	2–2	Blitar Poetra
Unknown 90'; Irfan Maulana 90+2'	Rep.	Dayonda Vino 24'; Dadang Dwi Cahyo 77'

Gelora Panataran Stadium, Blitar
15 December 2025
15:00

PSBI Blitar	1–2	Persenga Nganjuk
Akbar Khairat Ajiseno 35'	Rep.	Ludi Pratama 39'; Koko Dwi Anggara 90+2'

Gelora Panataran Stadium, Blitar

== Second round ==
The 32 teams that qualify from the first round will be drawn into 8 groups of four. The second round will be played in a home tournament format of single round-robin matches.

The top two teams of each group will qualify for the third round.

=== Group AA ===
- All matches will be held at ARG Soccer Field, Malang.

Pos	Team	Pld	W	D	L	GF	GA	GD	Pts	Qualification
1	Persedikab Kediri	3	2	0	1	5	2	+3	6	Third round
2	Persema Malang (H)	3	1	2	0	1	0	+1	5	Third round
3	Perseta Batara	3	1	1	1	2	2	0	4	
4	Hizbul Wathan	3	0	1	2	2	6	−4	1	

Source: 2025–26 Liga 4 East Java
Rules for classification: 1) Points; 2) Head-to-head points; 3) Head-to-head goal difference; 4) Head-to-head goals scored; 5) Goal difference; 6) Goals scored; 7) Fair-play points; 8) Draw.
(H) Hosts

Matchday 1
5 January 2026
13:00

Persedikab Kediri	4–1	Hizbul Wathan

ARG Soccer Field, Malang
5 January 2026
15:00

Persema Malang	0–0	Perseta Batara

ARG Soccer Field, Malang

Matchday 2
7 January 2026
13:00

Perseta Batara	0–1	Persedikab Kediri

ARG Soccer Field, Malang
7 January 2026
15:00

Hizbul Wathan	0–0	Persema Malang

ARG Soccer Field, Malang

Matchday 3
9 January 2026
13:15

Perseta Batara	2–1	Hizbul Wathan

ARG Soccer Field, Malang
9 January 2026
15:15

Persedikab Kediri	0–1	Persema Malang

ARG Soccer Field, Malang

=== Group BB ===
- All matches will be held at Tuban Sports Center, Tuban.

Pos	Team	Pld	W	D	L	GF	GA	GD	Pts	Qualification
1	Pasuruan United	3	3	0	0	8	0	+8	9	Third round
2	Triple'S Kediri	3	1	1	1	4	4	0	4	Third round
3	Persatu Tuban (H)	3	1	1	1	3	5	−2	4	
4	Nganjuk Ladang	3	0	0	3	2	8	−6	0	

Source: 2025–26 Liga 4 East Java
Rules for classification: 1) Points; 2) Head-to-head points; 3) Head-to-head goal difference; 4) Head-to-head goals scored; 5) Goal difference; 6) Goals scored; 7) Fair-play points; 8) Draw.
(H) Hosts

Matchday 1
5 January 2026
13:00

Nganjuk Ladang	0–3	Pasuruan United

Tuban Sports Center, Tuban
5 January 2026
15:00

Triple'S Kediri	1–1	Persatu Tuban

Tuban Sports Center, Tuban

Matchday 2
7 January 2026
13:00

Pasuruan United	2–0	Triple'S Kediri

Tuban Sports Center, Tuban
7 January 2026
15:00

Persatu Tuban	2–1	Nganjuk Ladang

Tuban Sports Center, Tuban

Matchday 3
9 January 2026
13:15

Triple'S Kediri	3–1	Nganjuk Ladang

Tuban Sports Center, Tuban
9 January 2026
15:15

Pasuruan United	3–0	Persatu Tuban

Tuban Sports Center, Tuban

=== Group CC ===
- All matches will be held at Gelora Bangkalan Stadium, Bangkalan.

Pos	Team	Pld	W	D	L	GF	GA	GD	Pts	Qualification
1	Perseba Bangkalan (H)	3	2	1	0	10	1	+9	7	Third round
2	Baruna Nusantara	3	2	1	0	7	2	+5	7	Third round
3	Perseta 1970	3	1	0	2	7	4	+3	3	
4	Putra Jaya Pasuruan	3	0	0	3	3	20	−17	0	

Source: 2025–26 Liga 4 East Java
Rules for classification: 1) Points; 2) Head-to-head points; 3) Head-to-head goal difference; 4) Head-to-head goals scored; 5) Goal difference; 6) Goals scored; 7) Fair-play points; 8) Draw.
(H) Hosts

Matchday 1
5 January 2026
13:00

Putra Jaya Pasuruan	2–7	Perseta 1970

Gelora Bangkalan Stadium, Bangkalan
5 January 2026
15:00

Perseba Bangkalan	1–1	Baruna Nusantara

Gelora Bangkalan Stadium, Bangkalan

Matchday 2
7 January 2026
13:00

Baruna Nusantara	5–1	Putra Jaya Pasuruan

Gelora Bangkalan Stadium, Bangkalan
7 January 2026
15:00

Perseta 1970	0–1	Perseba Bangkalan

Gelora Bangkalan Stadium, Bangkalan

Matchday 3
9 January 2026
13:15

Perseta 1970	0–1	Baruna Nusantara

Gelora Bangkalan Stadium, Bangkalan
9 January 2026
15:15

Perseba Bangkalan	8–0	Putra Jaya Pasuruan

Gelora Bangkalan Stadium, Bangkalan

=== Group DD ===
- All matches will be held at Jember Sport Garden Stadium, Jember.

Pos	Team	Pld	W	D	L	GF	GA	GD	Pts	Qualification
1	Inter Kediri	3	2	1	0	5	0	+5	7	Third round
2	Persid Jember (H)	3	1	2	0	2	0	+2	5	Third round
3	Persekap Pasuruan	3	1	1	1	3	3	0	4	
4	Arek Simo Putra	3	0	0	3	1	8	−7	0	

Source: 2025–26 Liga 4 East Java
Rules for classification: 1) Points; 2) Head-to-head points; 3) Head-to-head goal difference; 4) Head-to-head goals scored; 5) Goal difference; 6) Goals scored; 7) Fair-play points; 8) Draw.
(H) Hosts

Matchday 1
5 January 2026
13:00

Persekap Pasuruan	0–2	Inter Kediri

Jember Sport Garden Stadium, Jember
5 January 2026
15:00

Arek Simo Putra	0–2	Persid Jember

Jember Sport Garden Stadium, Jember

Matchday 2
7 January 2026
13:00

Inter Kediri	3–0	Arek Simo Putra

Jember Sport Garden Stadium, Jember
7 January 2026
15:00

Persid Jember	0–0	Persekap Pasuruan

Jember Sport Garden Stadium, Jember

Matchday 3
9 January 2026
13:15

Persekap Pasuruan	3–1	Arek Simo Putra

Jember Sport Garden Stadium, Jember
9 January 2026
15:15

Persid Jember	v	Inter Kediri

Jember Sport Garden Stadium, Jember

=== Group EE ===
- All matches will be held at Gelora Brantas Stadium, Batu.

Pos	Team	Pld	W	D	L	GF	GA	GD	Pts	Qualification
1	Persikoba Batu (H)	3	1	2	0	4	3	+1	5 (Note: Tied on head-to-head points and head-to-head goal difference. Ranked on head-to-head goal scored: Persikoba 3, UNESA 3, Persewangi 2.)	Third round
2	UNESA	3	1	2	0	4	3	+1	5	Third round
3	Persewangi Banyuwangi	3	1	2	0	3	2	+1	5	
4	Malang United	3	0	0	3	0	3	−3	0	

Source: 2025–26 Liga 4 East Java
Rules for classification: 1) Points; 2) Head-to-head points; 3) Head-to-head goal difference; 4) Head-to-head goals scored; 5) Goal difference; 6) Goals scored; 7) Fair-play points; 8) Draw.
(H) Hosts
Notes:

Matchday 1
5 January 2026
13:00

UNESA	1–1	Persewangi Banyuwangi

Gelora Brantas Stadium, Batu
5 January 2026
15:00

Persikoba Batu	1–0	Malang United

Gelora Brantas Stadium, Batu

Matchday 2
7 January 2026
13:00

Malang United	0–1	UNESA

Gelora Brantas Stadium, Batu
7 January 2026
15:00

Persewangi Banyuwangi	1–1	Persikoba Batu

Gelora Brantas Stadium, Batu

Matchday 3
9 January 2026
13:15

Persewangi Banyuwangi	1–0	Malang United

Gelora Brantas Stadium, Batu
9 January 2026
15:15

Persikoba Batu	2–2	UNESA

Gelora Brantas Stadium, Batu

=== Group FF ===
- All matches will be held at Gelora Ratu Pamelingan Stadium, Pamekasan.

Pos	Team	Pld	W	D	L	GF	GA	GD	Pts	Qualification
1	Persepam Pamekasan (H)	3	3	0	0	4	1	+3	9	Third round
2	Persekam Malang	3	2	0	1	6	3	+3	6	Third round
3	PSSS Situbondo	3	1	0	2	3	3	0	3	
4	AC Majapahit	3	0	0	3	2	8	−6	0	

Source: 2025–26 Liga 4 East Java
Rules for classification: 1) Points; 2) Head-to-head points; 3) Head-to-head goal difference; 4) Head-to-head goals scored; 5) Goal difference; 6) Goals scored; 7) Fair-play points; 8) Draw.
(H) Hosts

Matchday 1
4 January 2026
13:00

AC Majapahit	2–5	Persekam Malang

Gelora Ratu Pamelingan Stadium, Pamekasan
4 January 2026
15:00

Persepam Pamekasan	2–1	PSSS Situbondo

Gelora Ratu Pamelingan Stadium, Pamekasan

Matchday 2
6 January 2026
13:00

PSSS Situbondo	2–0	AC Majapahit

Gelora Ratu Pamelingan Stadium, Pamekasan
6 January 2026
15:00

Persekam Malang	0–1	Persepam Pamekasan

Gelora Ratu Pamelingan Stadium, Pamekasan

Matchday 3
8 January 2026
13:15

Persekam Malang	1–0	PSSS Situbondo

Gelora Ratu Pamelingan Stadium, Pamekasan
8 January 2026
15:15

Persepam Pamekasan	1–0	AC Majapahit

Gelora Ratu Pamelingan Stadium, Pamekasan

=== Group GG ===
- All matches will be held at Gelora Delta Stadium, Sidoarjo.

Pos	Team	Pld	W	D	L	GF	GA	GD	Pts	Qualification
1	Persida Sidoarjo (H)	3	3	0	0	6	1	+5	9	Third round
2	Persinga Ngawi	3	2	0	1	7	3	+4	6	Third round
3	Akor	3	1	0	2	2	7	−5	3	
4	PSBI Blitar	3	0	0	3	1	5	−4	0	

Source: 2025–26 Liga 4 East Java
Rules for classification: 1) Points; 2) Head-to-head points; 3) Head-to-head goal difference; 4) Head-to-head goals scored; 5) Goal difference; 6) Goals scored; 7) Fair-play points; 8) Draw.
(H) Hosts

Matchday 1
5 January 2026
13:00

Persinga Ngawi	2–1	PSBI Blitar

Gelora Delta Stadium, Sidoarjo
5 January 2026
15:00

Akor	0–3	Persida Sidoarjo

Gelora Delta Stadium, Sidoarjo

Matchday 2
7 January 2026
13:00

PSBI Blitar	0–2	Akor

Gelora Delta Stadium, Sidoarjo
7 January 2026
15:00

Persida Sidoarjo	2–1	Persinga Ngawi

Gelora Delta Stadium, Sidoarjo

Matchday 3
9 January 2026
13:15

Persinga Ngawi	4–0	Akor

Gelora Delta Stadium, Sidoarjo
9 January 2026
15:15

Persida Sidoarjo	1–0	PSBI Blitar

Gelora Delta Stadium, Sidoarjo

=== Group HH ===
- All matches will be held at Anjukladang Stadium, Nganjuk.

Pos	Team	Pld	W	D	L	GF	GA	GD	Pts	Qualification
1	Persenga Nganjuk (H)	3	3	0	0	11	2	+9	9	Third round
2	PS Mojokerto Putra	3	2	0	1	5	2	+3	6	Third round
3	PSID Jombang	3	1	0	2	7	7	0	3	
4	Persepon Ponorogo	3	0	0	3	3	15	−12	0	

Source: 2025–26 Liga 4 East Java
Rules for classification: 1) Points; 2) Head-to-head points; 3) Head-to-head goal difference; 4) Head-to-head goals scored; 5) Goal difference; 6) Goals scored; 7) Fair-play points; 8) Draw.
(H) Hosts

Matchday 1
5 January 2026
13:00

PS Mojokerto Putra	2–1	PSID Jombang

Anjukladang Stadium, Nganjuk
5 January 2026
15:00

Persepon Ponorogo	1–7	Persenga Nganjuk

Anjukladang Stadium, Nganjuk

Matchday 2
7 January 2026
13:00

PSID Jombang	5–2	Persepon Ponorogo

Anjukladang Stadium, Nganjuk
7 January 2026
15:00

Persenga Nganjuk	1–0	PS Mojokerto Putra

Anjukladang Stadium, Nganjuk

Matchday 3
9 January 2026
13:15

PS Mojokerto Putra	3–0	Persepon Ponorogo

Anjukladang Stadium, Nganjuk
9 January 2026
15:15

Persenga Nganjuk	3–1	PSID Jombang

Anjukladang Stadium, Nganjuk

== Third round ==
The 16 teams that qualify from the second round will be drawn into 4 groups of four. The third round will be played in a home tournament format of single round-robin matches.

The top two teams of each group will qualify for the fourth round.

=== Group II ===
- All matches will be held at Gelora Brantas Stadium, Batu and Cakrawala Stadium, Malang.

Pos	Team	Pld	W	D	L	GF	GA	GD	Pts	Qualification
1	Persikoba Batu (H)	3	2	0	1	3	2	+1	6 (Note: Head-to-head result: Triple'S Kediri 1–2 Persikoba Batu.)	Fourth round
2	Triple'S Kediri	3	2	0	1	5	3	+2	6	Fourth round
3	Persekam Malang	3	1	0	2	4	3	+1	3 (Note: Head-to-head result: Persedikab Kediri 0–3 Persekam Malang.)	
4	Persedikab Kediri	3	1	0	2	1	5	−4	3	

Source: 2025–26 Liga 4 East Java
Rules for classification: 1) Points; 2) Head-to-head points; 3) Head-to-head goal difference; 4) Head-to-head goals scored; 5) Goal difference; 6) Goals scored; 7) Fair-play points; 8) Draw.
(H) Hosts
Notes:

Matchday 1
20 January 2026
13:00

Persedikab Kediri	0–3	Persekam Malang

Gelora Brantas Stadium, Batu
20 January 2026
15:00

Triple'S Kediri	1–2	Persikoba Batu

Gelora Brantas Stadium, Batu

Matchday 2
22 January 2026
13:00

Persekam Malang	1–2	Triple'S Kediri

Gelora Brantas Stadium, Batu
22 January 2026
15:00

Persikoba Batu	0–1	Persedikab Kediri

Gelora Brantas Stadium, Batu

Matchday 3
24 January 2026
14:00

Persikoba Batu	1–0	Persekam Malang

Gelora Brantas Stadium, Batu
24 January 2026
14:00

Persedikab Kediri	0–2	Triple'S Kediri

Cakrawala Stadium, Malang

=== Group JJ ===
- All matches were held at R. Soedarsono Stadium, Pasuruan Regency and Untung Suropati Stadium, Pasuruan City.

Pos	Team	Pld	W	D	L	GF	GA	GD	Pts	Qualification
1	Pasuruan United (H)	3	2	1	0	6	4	+2	7	Fourth round
2	Persepam Pamekasan	3	1	2	0	8	4	+4	5	Fourth round
3	UNESA	3	1	1	1	4	3	+1	4	
4	Persema Malang	3	0	0	3	0	7	−7	0	

Source: 2025–26 Liga 4 East Java
Rules for classification: 1) Points; 2) Head-to-head points; 3) Head-to-head goal difference; 4) Head-to-head goals scored; 5) Goal difference; 6) Goals scored; 7) Fair-play points; 8) Draw.
(H) Hosts

Matchday 1
19 January 2026
13:00

Persema Malang	0–4	Persepam Pamekasan

R. Soedarsono Stadium, Pasuruan Regency
19 January 2026
15:00

Pasuruan United	2–1	UNESA

R. Soedarsono Stadium, Pasuruan Regency

Matchday 2
21 January 2026
13:00

UNESA	2–0	Persema Malang

R. Soedarsono Stadium, Pasuruan Regency
21 January 2026
15:00

Persepam Pamekasan	3–3	Pasuruan United

R. Soedarsono Stadium, Pasuruan Regency

Matchday 3
23 January 2026
14:00

Pasuruan United	1–0	Persema Malang

R. Soedarsono Stadium, Pasuruan Regency
23 January 2026
14:00

Persepam Pamekasan	1–1	UNESA

Untung Suropati Stadium, Pasuruan City

=== Group KK ===
- All matches will be held at Jember Sport Garden Stadium and Notohadinegoro Stadium, Jember.

Pos	Team	Pld	W	D	L	GF	GA	GD	Pts	Qualification
1	Persid Jember (H)	3	2	1	0	3	1	+2	7	Fourth round
2	PS Mojokerto Putra	3	1	1	1	2	2	0	4	Fourth round
3	Perseba Bangkalan	3	0	3	0	0	0	0	3	
4	Persida Sidoarjo	3	0	1	2	2	4	−2	1	

Source: 2025–26 Liga 4 East Java
Rules for classification: 1) Points; 2) Head-to-head points; 3) Head-to-head goal difference; 4) Head-to-head goals scored; 5) Goal difference; 6) Goals scored; 7) Fair-play points; 8) Draw.
(H) Hosts

Matchday 1
19 January 2026
13:00

Perseba Bangkalan	0–0	PS Mojokerto Putra

Jember Sport Garden Stadium, Jember
19 January 2026
15:00

Persid Jember	2–1	Persida Sidoarjo

Jember Sport Garden Stadium, Jember

Matchday 2
21 January 2026
13:00

Persida Sidoarjo	0–0	Perseba Bangkalan

Jember Sport Garden Stadium, Jember
21 January 2026
15:00

PS Mojokerto Putra	0–1	Persid Jember

Jember Sport Garden Stadium, Jember

Matchday 3
23 January 2026
14:00

Perseba Bangkalan	0–0	Persid Jember

Jember Sport Garden Stadium, Jember
23 January 2026
14:00

Persida Sidoarjo	1–2	PS Mojokerto Putra

Notohadinegoro Stadium, Jember

=== Group LL ===
- All matches will be held at Anjukladang Stadium and Gelora Bung Sumardji Stadium, Nganjuk.

Pos	Team	Pld	W	D	L	GF	GA	GD	Pts	Qualification
1	Persenga Nganjuk (H)	3	3	0	0	7	1	+6	9	Fourth round
2	Persinga Ngawi	3	2	0	1	2	2	0	6	Fourth round
3	Baruna Nusantara	3	1	0	2	3	5	−2	3	
4	Inter Kediri	3	0	0	3	1	5	−4	0	

Source: 2025–26 Liga 4 East Java
Rules for classification: 1) Points; 2) Head-to-head points; 3) Head-to-head goal difference; 4) Head-to-head goals scored; 5) Goal difference; 6) Goals scored; 7) Fair-play points; 8) Draw.
(H) Hosts

Matchday 1
20 January 2026
13:00

Inter Kediri	0–1	Persinga Ngawi

Anjukladang Stadium, Nganjuk
20 January 2026
15:00

Baruna Nusantara	1–3	Persenga Nganjuk

Anjukladang Stadium, Nganjuk

Matchday 2
22 January 2026
13:00

Baruna Nusantara	0–1	Persinga Ngawi

Anjukladang Stadium, Nganjuk
22 January 2026
15:00

Persenga Nganjuk	2–0	Inter Kediri

Anjukladang Stadium, Nganjuk

Matchday 3
24 January 2026
14:00

Persenga Nganjuk	2–0	Persinga Ngawi

Anjukladang Stadium, Nganjuk
24 January 2026
14:00

Inter Kediri	1–2	Baruna Nusantara

Gelora Bung Sumardji Stadium, Nganjuk

== Fourth round ==
The 8 teams that qualify from the third round will be drawn into 2 groups of four. The fourth round will be played in a home tournament format of single round-robin matches.

The top two teams of each group will qualify for the knockout round.

=== Group MM ===
- All matches were held at R. Soedarsono Stadium, Pasuruan Regency and Untung Suropati Stadium, Pasuruan City.

Pos	Team	Pld	W	D	L	GF	GA	GD	Pts	Qualification
1	Persinga Ngawi	3	2	1	0	6	1	+5	7	Knockout round
2	Pasuruan United (H)	3	2	0	1	3	2	+1	6	Knockout round
3	Persikoba Batu	3	0	2	1	1	2	−1	2	
4	PS Mojokerto Putra	3	0	1	2	1	6	−5	1	

Source: 2025–26 Liga 4 East Java
Rules for classification: 1) Points; 2) Head-to-head points; 3) Head-to-head goal difference; 4) Head-to-head goals scored; 5) Goal difference; 6) Goals scored; 7) Fair-play points; 8) Draw.
(H) Hosts

=== Group NN ===
- All matches will be held at Anjukladang Stadium and Gelora Bung Sumardji Stadium, Nganjuk.

Pos	Team	Pld	W	D	L	GF	GA	GD	Pts	Qualification
1	Persid Jember	3	2	1	0	8	3	+5	7	Knockout round
2	Persepam Pamekasan	3	2	1	0	7	4	+3	7	Knockout round
3	Persenga Nganjuk (H)	3	1	0	2	7	8	−1	3	
4	Triple'S Kediri	3	0	0	3	4	11	−7	0	

Source: 2025–26 Liga 4 East Java
Rules for classification: 1) Points; 2) Head-to-head points; 3) Head-to-head goal difference; 4) Head-to-head goals scored; 5) Goal difference; 6) Goals scored; 7) Fair-play points; 8) Draw.
(H) Hosts

== Knockout round ==
The knockout round will be played as a single match. If tied after regulation time, extra time and, if necessary, a penalty shoot-out will be used to decide the winning team.

=== Bracket ===
Semi-finals
13 February 2026
Persinga Ngawi	0
Persepam Pamekasan	1
13 February 2026
Persid Jember	1 (2)
Pasuruan United	1 (3)

Final
15 February 2026
Persepam Pamekasan	1 (5)
Pasuruan United	1 (3)
Third place play-off
15 February 2026
Persinga Ngawi	1
Persid Jember	4

=== Semi-finals ===
13 February 2026

Persinga Ngawi	0–1	Persepam Pamekasan

13 February 2026

Persid Jember	1–1 (a.e.t.)	Pasuruan United
Penalties
	2–3

=== Third place play-off ===
15 February 2026

Persinga Ngawi	1–4	Persid Jember

=== Final ===
15 February 2026

Persepam Pamekasan	1–1 (a.e.t.)	Pasuruan United
Penalties
	5–3

== See also ==
- 2025–26 Liga 4
