= Jamboree (disambiguation) =

A jamboree is a large, lively, often noisy gathering or festive celebration.

Jamboree may also refer to:

- Scout Jamborees

== Film and television ==
- Jamboree (1944 film), a film directed by Joseph Santley
- Jamboree (1957 film) (UK title: Disc Jockey Jamboree), a rock 'n' roll film directed by Roy Lockwood
- Jamboree (TV series), a UK children's programme broadcast by CITV

== Music ==
- Jamboree (Beat Happening album), or the title song
- Jamboree (Fast Life Yungstaz album), or the title song
- Jamboree (Guadalcanal Diary album), or the title song
- "Jamboree" (song), a 1999 song by Naughty by Nature
- Jazz Jamboree Festival
- WWVA Jamboree, a country music radio program on WWVA-AM, Wheeling, West Virginia
- Jamboree, a 1956 Radio Luxembourg music program presented by Alan Freed
- The Jamboree (music festival), an annual music festival held in Toledo, Ohio

== Video games ==
- Super Mario Party Jamboree, a 2024 Nintendo Switch party video game in the Mario Party series

== Other ==
- The Jamboree, an annual members-only golf tournament held at Augusta National Golf Club

== See also ==
- Jamboree 2008 (disambiguation)
- Jambo (disambiguation)
