= Jamba =

Jamba may refer to:

== Places ==
- Jamba, Cuando, Angola, former base of rebel group UNITA
- Jamba, Huíla, Angola
- Jamba, in Bap tehsil, Jodhpur District, Rajasthan, India

== People ==
- Jamba Ulengo (born 1990), South African rugby union player for the Tel Aviv Heat
- Almerindo Jaka Jamba (1949–2018), an Angolan politician
- Jamba (footballer), nickname of Angolan football defender João Pereira (born 1977)
- Sousa Jamba (born 1966), Angolan writer

== Other uses ==
- Japan–Australia Migratory Bird Agreement
- Jamba!, a ringtone vendor owned by VeriSign (known as "Jamster" in some countries)
- Jamba Juice, a company producing blended fruit and vegetable juices, smoothies and similar products
- "Jamba", a song by Tyler, the Creator, from the album Wolf
- Jamba, a fictional term in the plot of Kirby Star Allies

== See also ==
- Jambalaya, a mainly Creole dish
- Jambo (disambiguation)
- Jambi (disambiguation)
- Jambu (disambiguation)
