= Jambi, Nganjuk =

Jambi
- Location in Java and Indonesia Jambi (Indonesia)
- Coordinates: 7°34′45″S 112°01′18″E
- Country: Indonesia
- Province: East Java
- District: Baron District
- Time zone: Indonesia Eastern Time

Jambi is a village (desa) in Baron District, Nganjuk Regency, East Java Province, Indonesia.

== Economy ==
Short term, one year, Government Work Plan (RKP Desa), medium term, and long term plan, for period of 6 years, has been produced by regional development planning mechanism.
