= South Sudan STEPS Towards Peace and Democracy =

Political party in South Sudan

- Chairman: Suzanne Jambo - Interim
- Founded: November 29, 2017
- Ideology: South Sudanese nationalism
- National Legislative Assembly: 0 / 170

The South Sudan STEPS Towards Peace and Democracy is a political movement in the Republic of South Sudan.

== Origins ==
The Sudan People's Liberation Movement (SPLM), the governing party of South Sudan, fractured in December 2013, leading to the ongoing civil war that has killed thousands and forced a large number of people to seek refugees in neighbouring countries. The party was formed by senior officials who have split from the Sudan People's Liberation Movement (SPLM) faction allied to President Salva Kiir.

== History ==
A month after announcing her intention to run in the upcoming South Sudanese presidential election, Suzanne Jambo officially announced the formation of a new political party via Facebook on November 29, 2017.

== Members ==
=== Elected officials ===
- Chairman: Suzanne Jambo - Interim
- Deputy Chairman:
- Secretary General:

== See also ==
- Sudan People's Liberation Movement
