= Erni Suyanti Musabine =

Indonesian wildlife veterinarian and conservationist

- Born: September 14, 1975 (age 51); Nganjuk, East Java, Indonesia
- Education: Airlangga University (graduated 2002)
- Occupations: Veterinarian; conservationist
- Employer(s): Wildlife Rescue Unit, Ministry of Environment and Forestry
- Known for: Conservation and rescue of Sumatran tigers (work focused on tigers since 2007)
- Awards: Wanita Berani (Great Woman) — Liputan 6

Erni Suyanti Musabine is an Indonesian wildlife veterinarian. She works for the Wildlife Rescue Unit of the Indonesian Ministry of Environment and Forestry. Since 2007, her work has focused on the conservation and rescue of Sumatran tigers.

== Early life and education ==
Erni Suyanti Musabine was born in Nganjuk on 14 September 1975, the third daughter of H Musabine.

She studied veterinary medicine at Airlangga University in Surabaya, graduating in 2002. During her studies, she volunteered for a wildlife conservation organisation in East Java. The 1966 film Born Free was among the influences that fostered Yanti's passion for wildlife.

== Veterinary career ==
Yanti volunteered with the Petungsewu Wild Animal Rescue Center in Malang from 2002 to 2003. She was hired as veterinarian coordinator by the center in 2003, providing care for species that had been confiscated from illegal traders and hunters in Bali and East Java. When she was first hired as a veterinarian, her monthly salary was Rp150,000-300,000. Yanti moved to Sumatra in 2004 where she worked for the Institution for Conservation of Natural Resources (BKSDA) in Bengkulu. She was the only woman on the East Java BKSDA team. During her time at Bengkulu BKSDA, she received the Great Woman award (Wanita Berani) from Liputan 6.

Yanti was a veterinary consultant for the Frankfurt Zoological Society from 2005 to 2009, working for a conservation program rehabilitating Sumatran orangutans at the Bukit Tigapuluh National Park in Jambi.

From 2007 to 2013, she consulted for the Tiger Protection and Conservation Unit of the Kerinci Seblat National Park. In 2007, she rescued a Sumatran tiger caught in a snare on a rubber plantation in the interior of North Bengkulu. She had to sedate the animal before releasing it from the trap. Having limited equipment, she administered the tranquillizer with a hand syringe.

In 2011, during the rescue of an elephant, she was informed of a tiger caught in a hunter's trap in Air Rami, Mukomuko Regency. The tiger was in a remote jungle location, requiring three days of travel, two of which were on foot through rough terrain. She and her colleagues performed an amputation in the jungle. The tiger later required skin grafting.

In 2012 and 2013, she was a field coordinator for the Seblat Elephant Conservation Center and a wildlife conservation veterinarian field leader of Seblat Ecotourism Park's Conservation Response Unit.

Beginning in May 2014, she started working as a wildlife conservation veterinarian with the Wildlife Rescue Unit of the Indonesian Ministry of Environment and Forestry where she focused on larger mammals such as elephants, tigers, bears, orangutans, and tapirs. Her work also involves clouded leopards and sun bears. Her job involves handling, rehabilitating and reintroducing wild animals confiscated from illegal trade, illegal keeping, and poaching.

During her career, Yanti has participated in over a dozen rescues of tigers in Bengkulu province. She rescued a tiger in 2014 that had escaped a trap but was entangled in barbed wire. She had to search the brush for the tiger, which was hiding in the bushes. During a rescue in October 2015, she had to relocate two Sumatran tigers to the Kerinci Seblat National Park, Bengkulu. One of the tigers had been ensnared in a palm oil plantation. The relocation involved an hour-long crossing of the Seblat River in a narrow canoe, where she held the anaesthetized tiger, stroking it and monitoring its condition.

In May 2022, Yanti worked with the South Sumatra Natural Resources Conservation Center on a project to attach GPS collars to two wild Sumatran elephants.

Yanti is also involved with the Sumatran Tiger Conservation Forum and is on the advisory board of the Centre for Orangutan Protection. She trains veterinarians in the handling and sedation of tigers. She also conducts trainings on veterinary forensics and how to manage conflicts with tigers for communities, non-governmental organisations, patrol teams, and the forestry police (SPORC).

== Selected publications ==
- Munawar Kholis; Ahmad Faisal; Febri Anggriawan Widodo; Erni Suyanti Musabine (2020). Pedoman Penanggulangan Konflik Manusia-Harimau. Kementerian Lingkungan Hidup dan Kehutanan.
