= 2025 Liga 4 Malang Regency =

Liga 4 Malang Regency
- Season: 2025–26
- Dates: 10–20 November 2025
- Champions: Sinar Mas (1st title)
- Provincial phase: Sinar Mas

The 2025 Liga 4 Malang Regency (also known as Liga 4 Piala Bupati Malang) was the inaugural season of Liga 4 Malang Regency and serves as a qualifying round for the 2025–26 Liga 4 East Java. The competition is organised by the Malang Regency PSSI Association.

== Teams ==
A total of 8 teams are competing in this season.

== Venue ==
All matches was held in the Kahuripan Stadium.

== Group stage ==
A total of 8 teams drawn into 2 groups of four. The winners of each group along with the best runners-up will qualify for the knockout stage.

=== Group A ===
Pos	Team	Pld	W	D	L	GF	GA	GD	Pts	Qualification
1	Sinar Mas	3	3	0	0	11	3	+8	9	Advanced to knockout stage
2	Golden Foot	3	1	1	1	12	6	+6	4	Advanced to knockout stage
3	Arunda	3	1	1	1	8	7	+1	4	
4	Nukita FA	3	0	0	3	0	15	−15	0	

Source: Liga 4 Piala Bupati Malang

=== Group B ===
Pos	Team	Pld	W	D	L	GF	GA	GD	Pts	Qualification
1	Tumpang	3	1	1	1	8	3	+5	4	Advanced to knockout stage
2	Gerzy Star	3	1	1	1	5	5	0	4	Advanced to knockout stage
3	Mars	3	1	1	1	3	4	−1	4	
4	LGM United	3	1	1	1	3	7	−4	4	

Source: Liga 4 Piala Bupati Malang

== Knockout stage ==
The knockout stage will be played as a single match. If tied after regulation time, extra time and, if necessary, a penalty shoot-out will be used to decide the winning team.

=== Bracket ===
Semi-finals
18 November 2025 – Malang
A1	Sinar Mas	6
B2	Gerzy Star	1
18 November 2025 – Malang
B1	Tumpang	2
A2	Golden Foot	3

Final
20 November 2025 – Malang
Sinar Mas	4
Golden Foot	0

=== Semi-finals ===
18 November 2025
12:45 UTC+7

Sinar Mas	6–1	Gerzy Star
	Report

Kahuripan Stadium, Malang

18 November 2025
14:45 UTC+7

Tumpang	2–3	Golden Foot
	Report

Kahuripan Stadium, Malang

=== Final ===
20 November 2025
14:00 UTC+7

Sinar Mas	4–0	Golden Foot

Kahuripan Stadium, Malang

== See also ==
- 2025–26 Liga 4 East Java
- 2025–26 Liga 4 National phase
