= Jambi (disambiguation) =

Jambi is a province of Indonesia.

Jambi may also refer to:

== Geography ==
- Jambi (city), a city within Jambi Province
- Muaro Jambi Regency, a regency of the Jambi Province
- Jambi, Nganjuk, a village in East Java Province, Indonesia
- Jambi Airport

== Historically ==
- Jambi Kingdom, an ancient kingdom located around the present-day Jambi Province
- Jambi Sultanate, Sumatra
- Jambi Residency, administrative unit in the Dutch East Indies
- Jambi Uprising, an 1885 revolt in the Jambi Sultanate, modern Indonesia, which was put down by the Royal Netherlands Indies Army.

== Entertainment ==
- Jambi (film), an upcoming Indian Malayalam film
- Jambi (Pee-wee's Playhouse), a character from the television show Pee-wee's Playhouse
- "Jambi" (Tool song), a single from the album 10,000 Days by band Tool
- "Jambi" (Despina Vandi song), a single from the album Stin Avli Tou Paradisou by Despina Vandi

== Other uses ==
- Jambi Malay, the variant of the Malay language spoken in the Jambi Province
- QtJambi, a software development framework
