= Persenga Nganjuk =

Indonesian football club

- Full name: Persatuan Sepakbola Nganjuk
- Nickname: Singo Barong
- Founded: 17 August 1950; 75 years ago
- Ground: Anjukladang Stadium
- Capacity: 10,000
- Owner: Nganjuk Government
- Chairman: M. Nur Daenuri
- Manager: Trihandy Cahyo Saputro
- Coach: Wawan Hariono
- League: Liga 4
- 2024–25: Round of 16, (East Java zone)
Home colours	Away colours

Persatuan Sepakbola Nganjuk, commonly known as Persenga, is an Indonesian football club based in Nganjuk Regency, East Java. They currently compete in the Liga 4.

== History ==
Persenga Nganjuk was founded in 1950 and under the auspices of the Regional Government of Nganjuk Regency. In 2009, Persenga Nganjuk started his career in the lowest tier of the Indonesian League, Liga Indonesia Third Division. Previously, the routine of Persenga's internal competition was always actively rolled out by PSSI Nganjuk. This is, of course, to find the talent of local Football player from the region. Finally, under the leadership of Kenthong they were promoted to Liga Indonesia Second Division in 2010. In the following season, Persenga Nganjuk is a team that deserves to be called the Black Horse, with professional players, such as Dany Saputra, Dimas Galih Gumilang, Rossian Indira, Eko Wahyu to the native son of the Trio Agung Pambudi area, they were able to get the 5th Rank title, after beating Persekap Pasuruan 2–1, and Persenga Nganjuk promoted to Liga Indonesia First Division in the 2012 season.

With the formation of supporters from Persenga Nganjuk, namely Supermania (2010) and Superultras (2012), making all management, players and club coaches more ready to provide better achievements, they have passed Division 1, as well as promotion to the 2013 Indonesian Premier Division (LPIS), they successfully entered the national round of 12, after defeating Persisum Sumbawa 3–0.

=== Golden era ===
A new history for Persenga Nganjuk was born in 2013. They competed again in the First Division stage. Under the leadership of a successful entrepreneur in Kalimantan, Sutikno, Persenga Nganjuk took part in the 2013 Indonesian Premier Division (LPIS). Several star players such as Budi Sudarsono, Chairul Rifan, Sulis Budi Prasetyo, Lamarana Diallo, were deliberately brought in with fantastic contract prices to be able to raise football in Nganjuk. In addition, the facilities for the convenience of the players and the official team were also improved and all served professionally by the management, such as official buses, national standard players' messes to revamping stadium lights, which had to be funded by the CEO. until the 2013 Indonesian Premier Division competition ended, they managed to come out as fourth Place, and at that time lost to competing with big teams such as, PSS Sleman (1st Place), Lampung FC (2nd place), and Persitara Jakarta Utara (3rd place).

== Honours ==
- 2009/10 = 9th Division II
- 2010/11 = 5th Division II (Promotion to Division I)
- 2011/12 = ... Division I

== Supporter ==
Supermania (fullname: Supporter Persenga Mania) is supporter of Persenga Nganjuk.
