= Floella Benjamin =

British actress, presenter and peer (born 1949)

The Right Honourable The Baroness Benjamin OM DBE DL
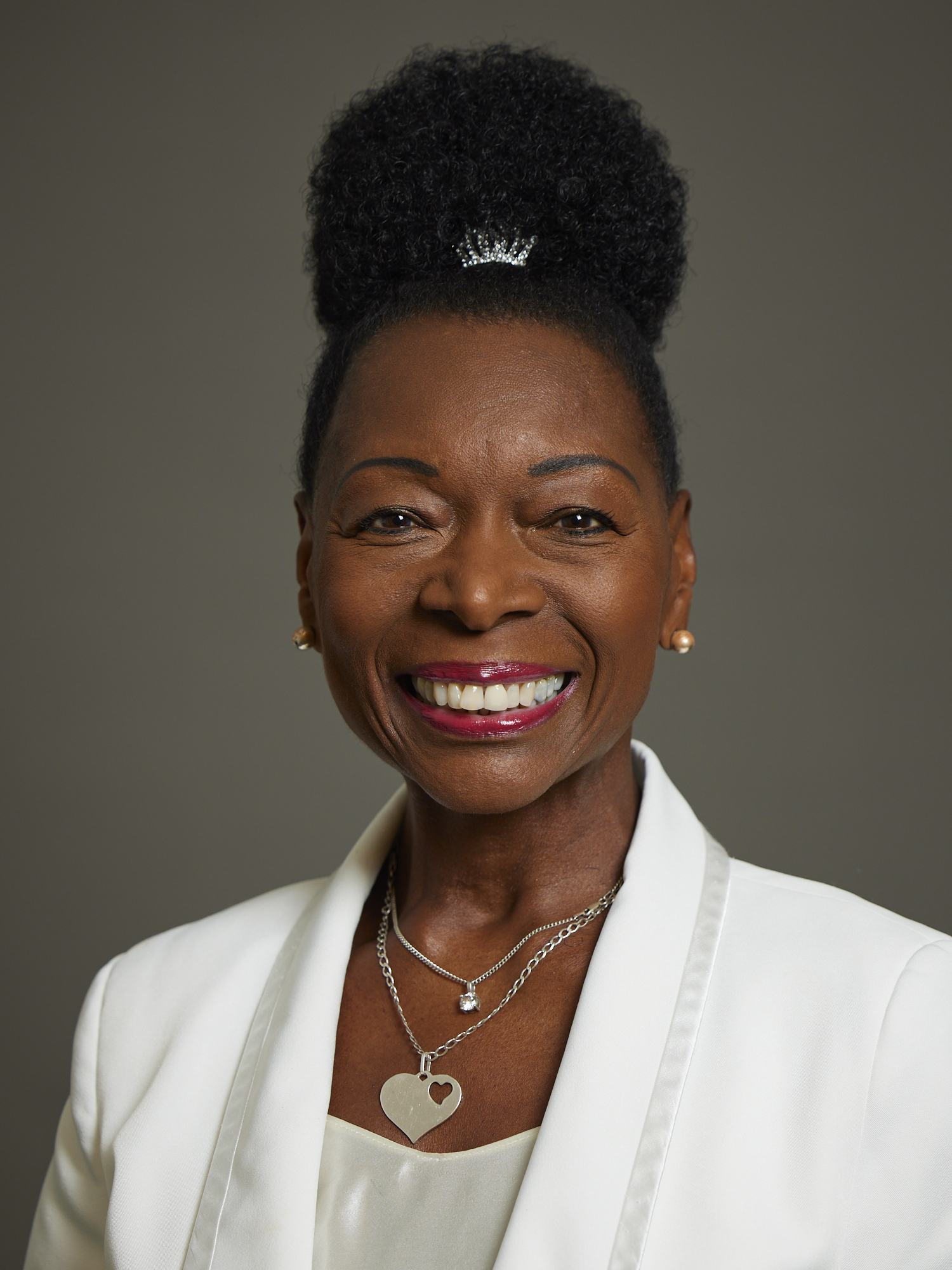
- Official portrait, 2023

Member of the House of Lords
- Lord Temporal
- Life peerage 26 June 2010

Personal details
- Born: Floella Karen Yunies Benjamin; 23 September 1949 (age 77) Pointe-à-Pierre, Trinidad and Tobago
- Party: Liberal Democrats
- Spouse: Keith Taylor (m. 1980)
- Children: 2
- Occupation: Actress, singer, presenter, author and politician
- Known for: Presenter of children's programmes including Play School, Play Away and Jamboree

Floella Karen Yunies Benjamin, Baroness Benjamin OM DBE DL (born 23 September 1949), is a Trinidadian-British actress, singer, presenter, author and politician. She is known as presenter of children's programmes such as Play School, Play Away, Jamboree and Fast Forward. On 28 June 2010, Lady Benjamin was introduced to the House of Lords as a life peer nominated by the Liberal Democrats. In 2024, she was honoured with the BAFTA Fellowship award for her services to television.

== Early life ==
Floella Benjamin was born on 23 September 1949 in Pointe-à-Pierre, Trinidad and Tobago, one of six siblings, with one older sister, three younger brothers and a younger sister.

When her father decided to emigrate to Britain, with her mother later joining him along with Benjamin’s younger sister and youngest brother, the four older children were left in the care of family friends, with Benjamin and her older sister, Sandra, being separated from their brothers. The people looking after Benjamin and her sister were secretly abusive. Benjamin and her sister often tried writing to their parents to tell them about the abuse, but the letters were always read and censored before they were sent. In 1960, the children went to join their father in Beckenham, Kent. Benjamin has discussed the racist experiences she had when arriving in Britain as an immigrant, such as with neighbours and at school.

Having left school to work in a bank, Benjamin studied for A-levels at night school. After a spell as a stage actress in West End musicals, she began presenting children's television programmes in 1976, notably Play School, for the BBC.

== Entertainment ==
Benjamin has appeared in Hair, Jesus Christ Superstar, The Black Mikado and The Husband-In-Law, as well as several pantomimes. On screen, she appeared in the 1975 horror film I Don't Want to Be Born and starred in the 1977 film Black Joy. Her television credits include Angels, Within These Walls, Crown Court, The Gentle Touch and Dixon of Dock Green. She appeared as Juniper in the first episode of Bergerac (1981).

Benjamin read two stories for the Story Teller magazine series (1983 and 1984). She was chief executive of Floella Benjamin Productions Ltd, which had produced television programmes since 1987 and was dissolved in 2014. In 1995, she became the voice of the "U" and "PG" information notices for the Video Standards Council. In 2006, she appeared in an episode of The Line of Beauty.

Between 2007 and 2011, she guest-starred in the Doctor Who spin-off The Sarah Jane Adventures as Professor Rivers of the Pharos Institute in the stories The Lost Boy, The Day of the Clown, The Eternity Trap, and Sky. Benjamin also narrated three "making-of" documentaries on the Doctor Who DVD boxed set The Black Guardian Trilogy. In 2007, she played a small role in the British comedy Run Fatboy Run.

She sings with Damn Right I Got The Blues, a rock and blues band, and has said: "When I sing I am in my element."

Benjamin featured in the 2023–24 New Year's Eve fireworks display in London, reciting the poem "In This World" by the late Benjamin Zephaniah as part of the segment celebrating the 75th anniversary of the arrival of the Empire Windrush.

== Publications ==
Benjamin's 20th book, a memoir, Coming to England, about moving from Trinidad, was published in 1995, and is now used to teach modern history to young people. It was made into a television film by CBBC in 2005.

Other books written by Benjamin and published by various houses include titles such as Floella's Fun Book, Why the Agouti Has No Tail, Caribbean Cookery and Snotty and the Rod of Power. Many of her titles are aimed at children and development.

== Honours and offices ==
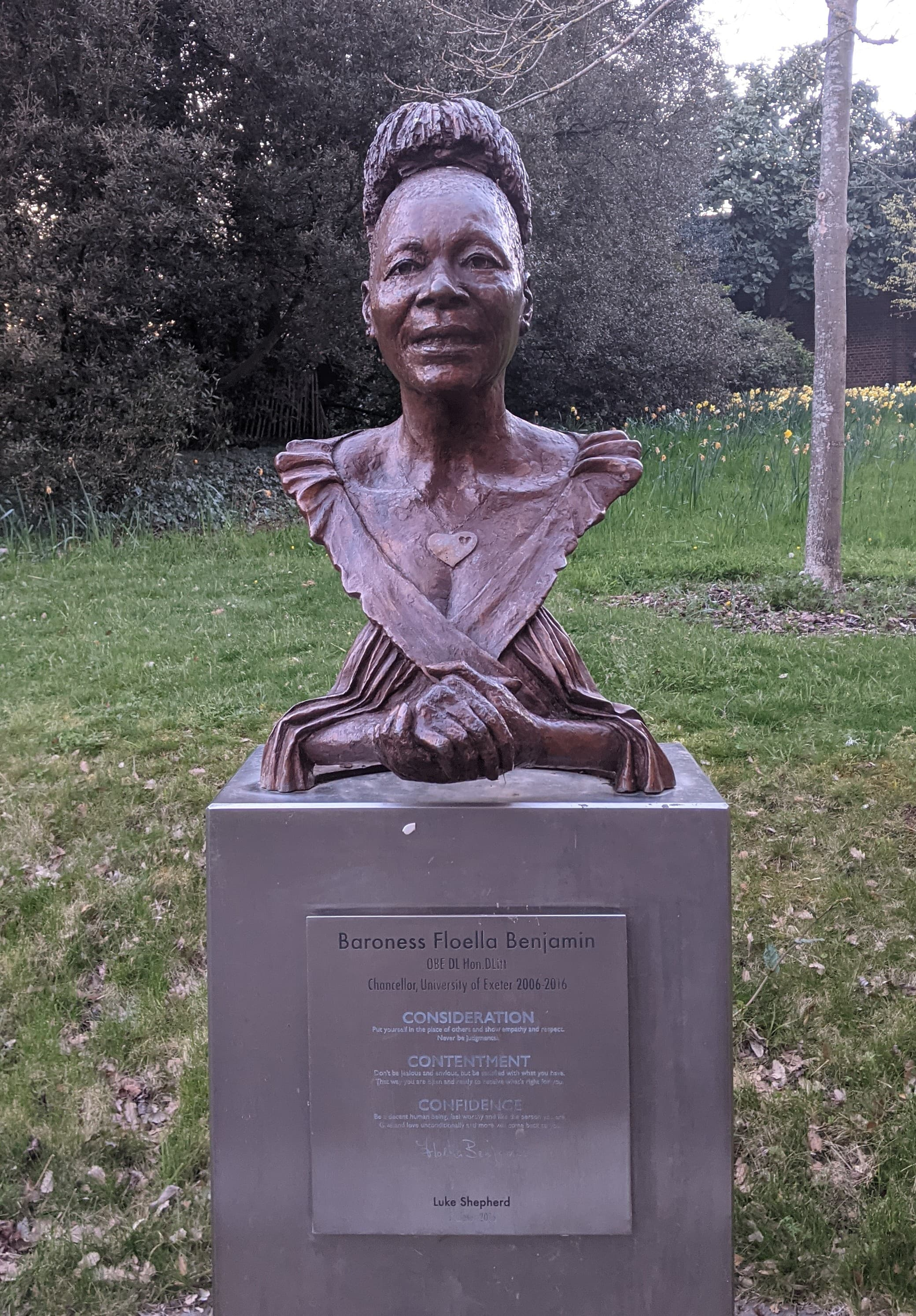
Bust of Benjamin outside the University of Exeter's students' guild. Artist: Luke Shepherd

Benjamin was appointed Officer of the Order of the British Empire (OBE) in the 2001 New Year Honours for services to broadcasting. At that time she was chairperson of the British Academy of Film and Television Arts (BAFTA). She has also won a Special Lifetime Achievement award from BAFTA. She was chairperson of the Women of the Year Lunch for five years and a Millennium Commissioner. She is president of the Elizabeth R Commonwealth Broadcasting Fund and a governor of the National Film and Television School. She was a governor of Dulwich College, where her mother once worked and her son had attended.

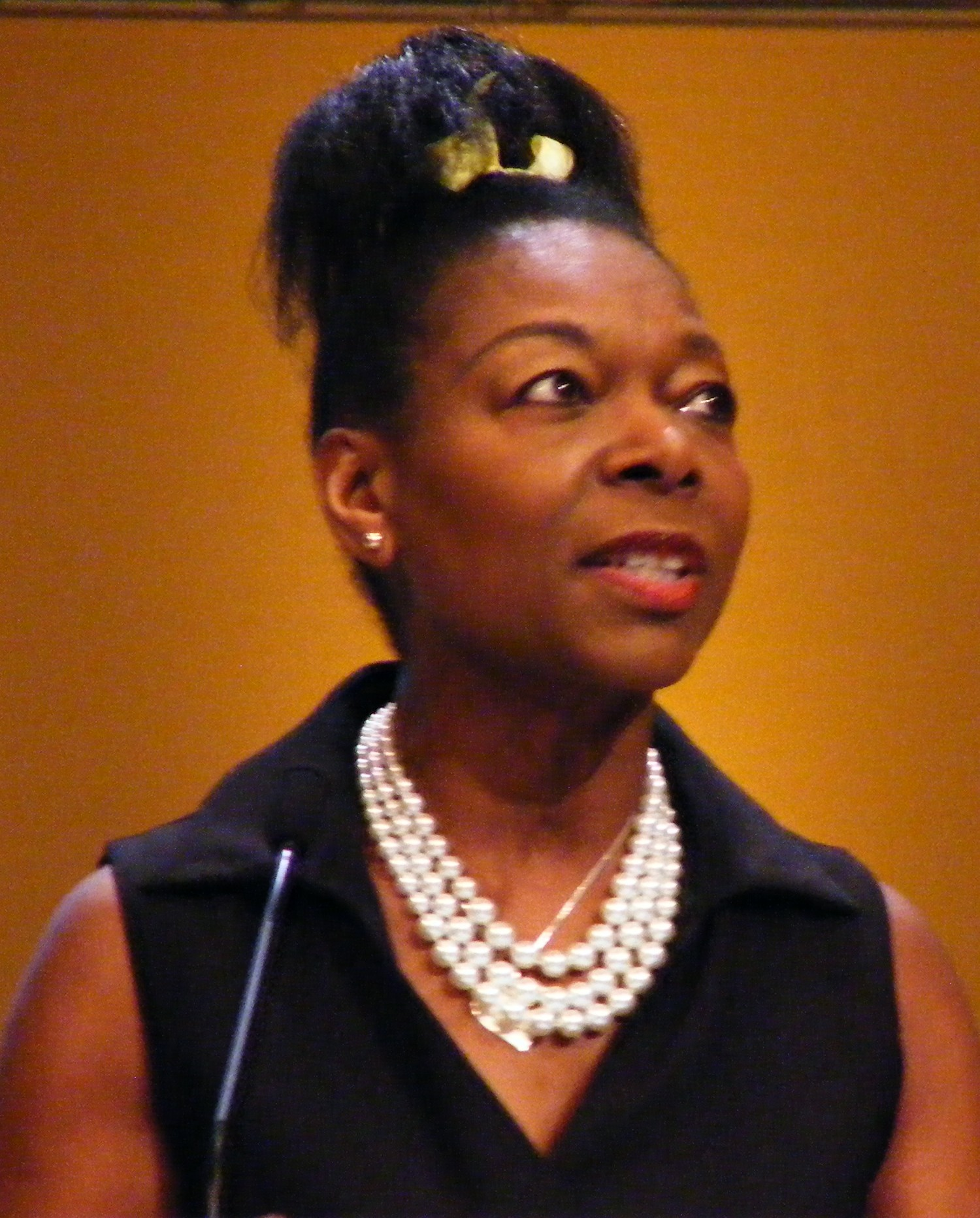
Benjamin in 2009

In 2006, she was awarded the degree of honorary D.Litt. (Exon) by the University of Exeter for contributions to the life of the United Kingdom. Benjamin succeeded Lord Alexander of Weedon as Chancellor of the University of Exeter. She famously hugged graduates instead of traditionally shaking their hands during the graduation ceremonies. Benjamin stepped down from office in winter 2016 after ten years in the post.

A statue of Benjamin is outside the University's student guild.(shown on the right) The plaque reads Consideration ~ put yourself in the place of others and show empathy and respect. Never be judgmental.; Contentment ~ Don't be jealous and envious, but be satisfied with what you have. That way you are open and ready to receive what is right for you.; Confidence ~ Be a decent human being, feel worthy and like the person you are. Give and love unconditionally and more will come back to you. This was the first public statue of a named living black woman in the UK.

On 10 December 2008, Benjamin was appointed a Deputy lieutenant of Greater London. In the 2010 Dissolution Honours List, she was appointed a Liberal Democrat life peer, being created Baroness Benjamin, of Beckenham in the County of Kent on 26 June 2010. She was the first actress to become a peer in the House of Lords. In her maiden speech, she spoke of choosing Beckenham to reflect the legacy of her mother and father, and the importance of childhood. She referenced her support of such charities as NSPCC, Childline, and Barnados, and their work to protect and support the health and wellbeing of vulnerable children.

In the 2020 Powerlist, Benjamin was listed in the Top 100 of the most influential people in the UK of African/African-Caribbean descent in the UK. The same year saw Benjamin appointed Dame Commander of the Order of the British Empire (DBE) in the 2020 New Year Honours for services to charity. On 12 March 2020, in an Investiture ceremony at Buckingham Palace, she received the insignia from Prince Charles. In 2022, she was awarded the honorary degree of Doctor of Letters (D.Litt.) by the University of Chester. She was made a member of the Order of Merit in 2022.

Benjamin was chosen to carry the Sceptre with Dove at the Coronation of Charles III and Camilla. Benjamin was presented with the BAFTA Fellowship award at the 70th British Academy Television Awards. Of the honour, BAFTA stated: "We are honoured to present Baroness Benjamin the BAFTA Fellowship for her tireless support of children and young people, her impact on television broadcasting, and for her unwavering championing of diversity. She is an unstoppable force for good with a determination to create opportunities and positive role models for future generations that has seen her effect a tremendous amount of positive change over fifty years and counting. She is deservedly a national treasure and we can’t wait to celebrate the impact of her work to date on 12th May at the BAFTA Television Awards."

== Educational and charitable interests ==
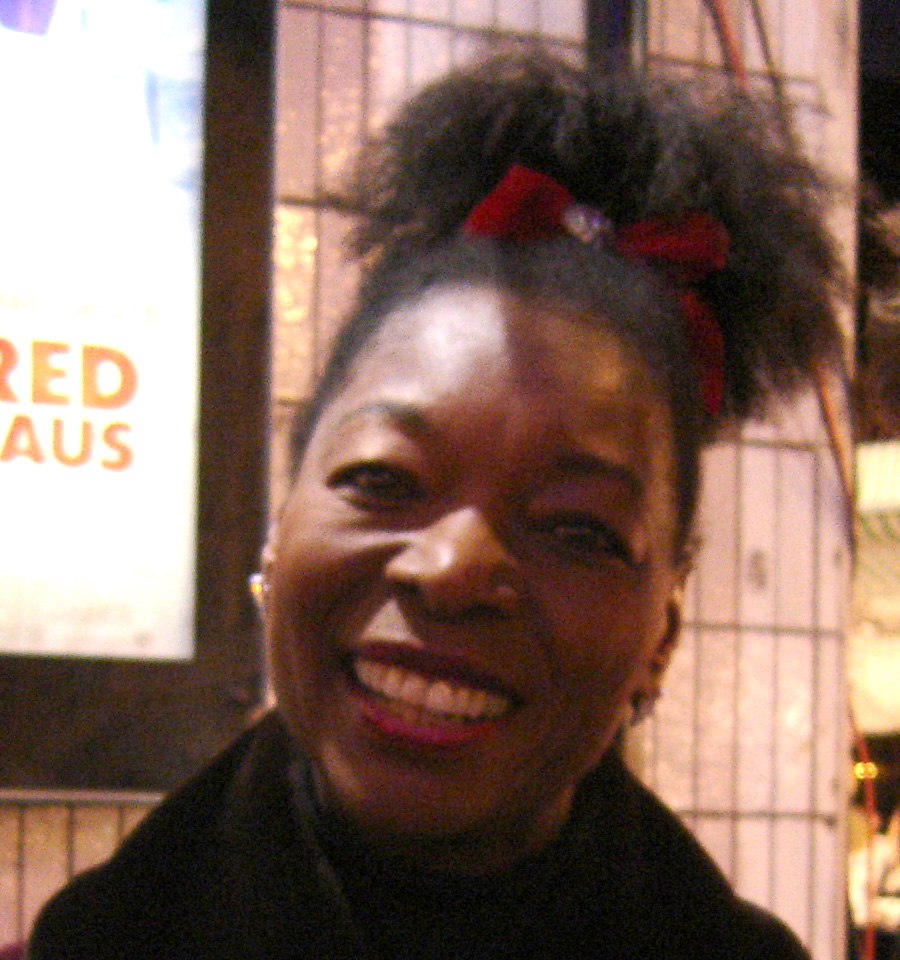
Benjamin in 2007

Benjamin's interest in education has also seen her on the "4Rs Commission" established by the Liberal Democrats to look into primary education in the UK.

Benjamin is vice-president of NCH Action for Children and Barnardo's, and was in the NSPCC's Hall of Fame. She runs the London Marathon to raise funds for Barnardo's and the Sickle Cell Society. She was a cultural ambassador for the 2012 Summer Olympics. In September 2011, she participated in the Great North Run. She features in the BBCs CBeebies animation Mama Mirabelle's Home Movies.

In July 2007, Benjamin spoke of what she saw as the low standard of children's television and in March 2013, she used a speech marking International Women's Day to warn of the impact on children of the availability of violent pornographic material online, saying that this was leading to the increasing objectification of women.

Benjamin is a patron of the charity Beating Bowel Cancer, having lost her mother to the disease in 2009.

In October 2015, in a talk to migrant children, Benjamin said that dropping her Trinidadian accent was the key to her success and that migrant pupils should do the same to avoid racism and bullying.

In June 2022, as chair of the Windrush Commemoration Committee, she unveiled a statue in Waterloo Station by the sculptor Basil Watson as the National Windrush Monument in the presence of the Duke of Cambridge.

== Filmography ==
=== Film ===
Year	Title	Role
1975	I Don't Want to Be Born	1st nurse
1977	Black Joy	Miriam
2004	Brand Spanking (short)	School Tannoy
2007	Rendition	CIA staffer
2007	Run Fatboy Run	Libby's mum

=== Television ===
Year	Title	Role	Notes
1974	Crown Court	Jenny Marsh	Episode: "Victims of Prejudice: Part 1"
1974–1975	Within These Walls	Barbara	5 episodes
1975	Dixon of Dock Green	Mrs Dallas	Episode: "Target"
1975–1979	Play for Today	Norma / Marie-Louise / Solicitor's clerk	3 episodes
1976–1988	Play School	Presenter	
1978	The Wild Bunch	Melody	Episode: "Send in the Girls"
1978	Mixed Blessings	Karen	Episode: "The Housewarming"
1978–1979	Angels	Marigold Glasspole / April Yallop	3 episodes
1979	Kids	Ella Buckley	Episode: "Laurie"
1980	The Gentle Touch	Gloria	Episode: Shock
1980s	Playdays	Presenter	
1981	Maybury	Kayreen	Episode: "Hugo & Colin"
1981	Bergerac	Juniper	Episode: "Picking It Up"
1982	Strangers	Rosy Baker	Episode: "With These Gloves You Can Pass Through Mirrors"
1984	Father's Day	TV interviewer	Episode: "Liberty, Equality, Paternity"
1984–1987	Fast Forward	Presenter	
1986	Roland Rat: The Series	BBC 3 announcer	Episode 1.11
1986	Lay on Five	Presenter	
1990	Family Fortunes	Tiddles	Celebrity Christmas Special 2
1994–1995	Hullabaloo	Presenter	
1998–2000	Jamboree	Presenter	
2000–2001	Fetch the Vet	Kara	TV show, voice role
2005	Coming to England	Teacher	TV movie
2006	Little Miss Jocelyn	Herself	TV show
2006	The Line of Beauty	Mrs Charles	TV mini-series
2007–2008	Mama Mirabelle's Home Movies	Mama Mirabelle	UK voice
2007–2011	The Sarah Jane Adventures	Professor Rivers	5 episodes
2010–2022	Chuggington	Mayor Pullman	UK voice
2013	CBeebies: A Christmas Carol	Party guest	TV movie
2022	Countdown	Presenter	40th anniversary guest presenter
2025 -	CBeebies House: Time to Play	Special Visitor	Digital Series
2025	The Masked Singer	Herself/Santa's Sack	Christmas Special contestant

Academic offices
Preceded by The Lord Alexander of Weedon	Chancellor of the University of Exeter; 2006–2016	Succeeded by The Lord Myners
