= Anjukladang Stadium =

Stadium in East Java, Indonesia

- Location in Java
- Address: Jl. Anjuk Ladang, Ploso, Nganjuk, Nganjuk Regency, East Java 64417
- Location: Nganjuk, Nganjuk Regency, East Java, Indonesia
- Coordinates: 7.621570°S 111.896964°E
- Owner: Regency government of Nganjuk
- Operator: Regency government of Nganjuk
- Capacity: 10,000
- Surface: Grass field

Tenants
- Persenga Nganjuk; Nganjuk Ladang F.C.

Anjukladang Stadium is a football stadium in the town of Nganjuk, Nganjuk Regency, East Java, Indonesia. The stadium has a capacity of 10,000 people.

It is the home base of Persenga Nganjuk.
