= Jamboree (TV series) =

- Title card
- Directed by: Keith Taylor
- Presented by: Floella Benjamin (host)
- Starring: Children of Speake School; Children of Rosemead School
- Theme music composer: Tim Cross; Ian Roland
- Country of origin: United Kingdom
- Original language: English
- No. of seasons: 4
- No. of episodes: 58

Production
- Producers: Pam Colbourne; Alex Baynes; Ros Edwards; Floella Benjamin
- Editor: Kyle Rainford
- Production companies: Floella Benjamin Productions; XL Entertainment; Knowledge Through Entertainment

Original release
- Network: CITV
- Release: 2 June 1998 – 24 May 2001

Jamboree is a British children's television programme that aired on CITV from 2 June 1998 until 24 May 2001. Jamboree was produced by Floella Benjamin Productions for XL Entertainment, a production company based in Chichester, United Kingdom. It was primarily aimed at its target audience of pre-school children.

== About the show ==
Each episode starts with Benjamin introducing each character known as the "Bopkins". They could be seen making their beds before heading over to a personal computer. One of the characters would then put a compact disc into the disc drive. They would then take it in turns to choose an icon. A short segment would then be shown. Each episode would start and end on a segment called "Floella's house".

=== Series 1 (1998) ===
1. Numbers - 2 June 1998
2. Up And Down - 9 June 1998
3. Animals - 16 June 1998
4. Let's Dance - 23 June 1998
5. Sizes - 30 June 1998
6. Making Things - 7 July 1998
7. Differences - 14 July 1998
8. Golf - 21 July 1998
9. Food - 28 July 1998
10. The Seaside - 4 August 1998
11. Shapes - 11 August 1998
12. Friends - 18 August 1998
13. Dressing Up - 25 August 1998

=== Series 2 (1999) ===
1. Parties - 8 June 1999
2. Making Paper Aeroplanes - 15 June 1999
3. Bodies - 22 June 1999
4. Music - 29 June 1999
5. Colours - 6 July 1999
6. Daytime And Nighttime - 13 July 1999
7. Games - 20 July 1999
8. Weather And Travelling - 27 July 1999
9. Time - 3 August 1999
10. Puzzle Time - 17 July 1999
11. Plants And Nature - 24 August 1999
12. Things In The Sky - 2 September 1999

=== Series 3 (2000) ===
1. Magic - 10 May 2000
2. Red - 17 May 2000
3. Opposites - 24 May 2000
4. Soft And Hard - 31 May 2000
5. ABC's - 7 June 2000
6. Big And Small - 14 June 2000
7. Old Things And New Things - 21 June 2000
8. Odd Numbers - 28 June 2000
9. Baking A Cake - 5 July 2000
10. Reading Books - 12 July 2000
11. Blue - 19 July 2000
12. In And Out - 26 July 2000

=== Series 4 (2001) ===
1. Farms - 30 April 2001
2. Breaking - 1 May 2001
3. Hot And Cold - 2 May 2001
4. Relations - 3 May 2001
5. Loud And Quiet - 4 May 2001
6. Illness - 8 May 2001
7. Even Numbers - 9 May 2001
8. Pictures - 10 May 2001
9. Trees - 11 May 2001
10. Sharing - 14 May 2001
11. Water - 15 May 2001
12. Yellow - 16 May 2001
13. Rubbish - 17 May 2001
14. Red - 18 May 2001
15. Heavy And Light - 24 May 2001

== Characters ==
The series featured four main characters. These were Bizza Bopkin, Billy Bopkin, Betty Bopkin (played by Sammy Davis) and Baby Bopkin (played by Warwick Davis.)

== Segments ==
Floella's house

A live action segment at the start and end of each episode. Floella plays games and sings songs with a group of children in her garden. At the end of each episode she would use the catchphrase "Until next time from them and me ... It's goodbye from Jamboree".

Mimi and Scruff

The antics of two friends. A dog and a monkey in stop motion.

Playtime

Live action with children narrating while playing a game.

Storytime

A classic story acted out with no talking and much movement, often with Benjamin starring and a narrator.

Video fun

A live action educational video clip.

== VHS tapes ==
- Animals and Music Fun (1999)
- Numbers and Colour Fun (2000)
- Let's Dance Dressing Up and Puzzle Time (2001)
