= Baruna Nusantara Banyuwangi F.C. =

Indonesian football club

Baruna Nusantara Banyuwangi
- Full name: Baruna Nusantara Banyuwangi Football Club
- Nickname: Laskar Naga Samudra
- Short name: BNB
- Founded: 2010; 16 years ago, as Mitra Bola Utama; 2023; 3 years ago as Baruna Nusantara Banyuwangi
- Ground: Diponegoro Stadium; Banyuwangi, East Java
- Capacity: 5,000
- Owner: Hariyono
- Chairman: Hariyono
- Head coach: Bambang Sumantri
- League: Liga 4
- 2023: Round of 16, (East Java zone)
Home colours	Away colours

Baruna Nusantara Banyuwangi Football Club (simply known as Baruna Nusantara Banyuwangi or BNB, formerly known as Mitra Bola Utama or MBU Sidoarjo) is an Indonesian football club based in Banyuwangi, East Java. They currently compete in the Liga 4. In 2011, the club won the Liga Indonesia Third Division and got promoted to the Second Division.

== Honours ==
- Liga Indonesia Third Division
  - Champion (1): 2010–11
