= Baron District =

Baron District (Kecamatan Baron)
- district
- Interactive map of Baron District
- Country: Indonesia
- Province: East Java
- Regency: Nganjuk

Area
  - Total: 40.06 km^{2} (15.47 sq mi)

Population (mid 2024 estimate)
  - Total: 56,460
  - Density: 1,409/km^{2} (3,650/sq mi)
- Time zone: UTC+7 (WIB)

Baron District is an administrative district (kecamatan) in Nganjuk Regency, in East Java Province of Indonesia.

== See also ==
- Districts of Indonesia
- List of regencies and cities of Indonesia
