= Tuban Regency =

Regency in East Java, Indonesia

Tuban Regency Kabupaten Tuban
- Regency

Other transcription(s)
  - Javanese: Tuban (Gêdrig) توبان (Pégon) ꦠꦸꦧꦤ꧀ (Hånåcåråkå)
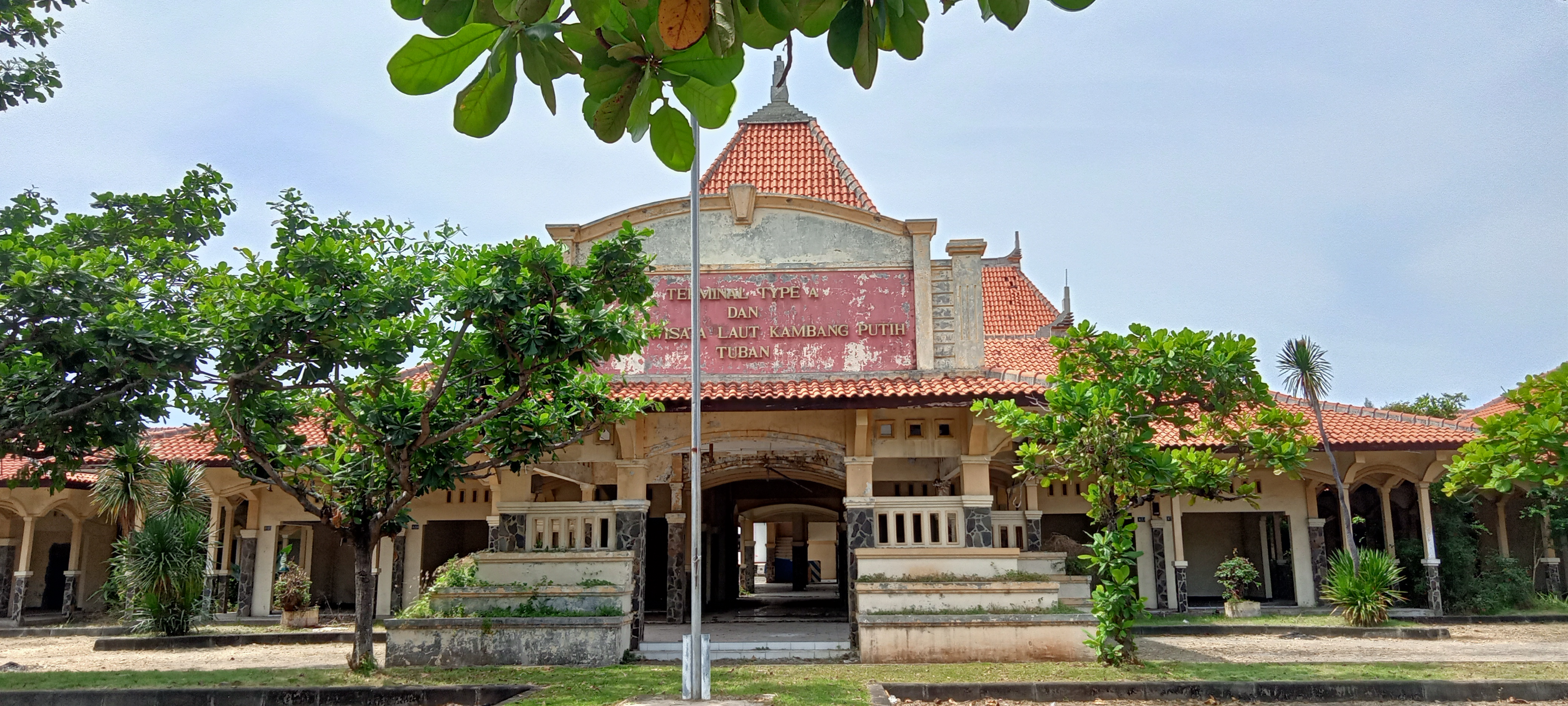
- Kambang Terminal

- Coat of arms
- Motto: “Terwujudnya masyarakat Kabupaten Tuban yang mandiri dan sejahtera lahir batin “ (striving to make Tubanese society wholly independent and prosperous)
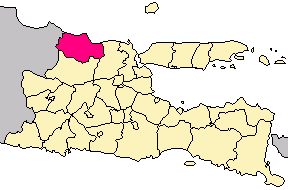
- Location within East Java

- Location in Java and Indonesia Tuban Regency (Indonesia)
- Coordinates: 6°53′S 112°03′E
- Country: Indonesia
- Province: East Java
- Anniversary: 12 November 1293
- Capital: Tuban

Government
  - Regent: Aditya Halindra Faridzky
  - Vice Regent: Joko Sarwono

Area
  - Total: 1,839.94 km^{2} (710.40 sq mi)

Population (mid 2025 estimate)
  - Total: 1,272,898
  - Density: 691.815/km^{2} (1,791.79/sq mi)
- Time zone: UTC+7 (IWST)
- Area code: (+62) 356
- Website: tubankab.go.id

Tuban Regency (Javanese: ꦏꦧꦸꦥꦠꦺꦤ꧀ꦠꦸꦧꦤ꧀) is a regency in the East Java province of Indonesia. The Dutch name of the regency is 'Toeban'. It covers a land area of 1,839.94 sq. km, and had a population of 1,118,464 at the 2010 Census and 1,198,012 at the 2020 Census; the official estimate as at mid 2025 was 1,272,898 (comprising 637,249 males and 635,649 females). The administrative centre is the coastal town of Tuban.

The Regency is bordered to the north by the Java Sea, east by Lamongan Regency, south by Bojonegoro Regency, and west by Blora Regency and Rembang Regency (both in Central Java Province). The regency is located in a strategic area, on the border of East Java with Central Java, passed by the main highway (Jalan Nasional Daendels) along the north coast of Java (here called Jalur Pantai Utara or Jalur Pantura). In ancient times, Tuban was the main port of Majapahit and was a center of Islamic spreading by Walisongo.

== Administrative districts ==
Tuban Regency consists of twenty districts (kecamatan), tabulated below with their areas and their population totals from the 2010 Census and the 2020 Census, together with the official estimates as at mid 2025. The table also includes the locations of the district administrative centres, the number of administrative villages in each district (totaling 311 rural desa and 17 urban kelurahan), and their postal codes.

Kode Wilayah	Name of District (kecamatan)	Area in km^{2}	Pop'n Census 2010	Pop'n Census 2020	Pop'n Estimate mid 2025	Admin centre	No. of villages	Post codes
35.23.01	Kenduruan	85.73	26,317	28,343	30,366	Sidomukti	9	62363
35.23.03	Bangilan	77.27	43,477	48,052	50,710	Bangilan	14	62364
35.23.05	Senori	78.39	38,373	41,653	43,987	Sendang	12	62365
35.23.07	Singgahan	79.05	39,193	41,345	44,761	Mulyoagung	12	62361
35.23.10	Montong	147.98	51,300	53,343	56,684	Montongsekar	13	62357
35.23.09	Parengan	114.45	51,546	53,603	57,770	Parangbatu	18	62366
35.23.11	Soko	96.88	78,667	83,814	90,926	Sokosari	23	62372
35.23.14	Rengel	58.52	56,388	59,306	62,492	Rengel	16	62370
35.23.20	Grabagan	73.79	36,406	39,040	41,925	Grabagan	11	62371
35.23.17	Plumpang	86.52	74,206	78,147	83,937	Plumpang	18	62382
35.23.19	Widang	107.14	47,413	48,726	52,573	Widang	16	62383
35.23.18	Palang	72.70	76,875	86,743	90,857	Leran Kulon	19 ^{(a)}	62391
35.23.15	Semanding	120.99	101,336	114,136	121,121	Bejagung	17 ^{(b)}	62381
35.23.16	Tuban (town)	21.29	81,982	84,542	88,128	Latsari	17 ^{(c)}	62311: 62319
35.23.12	Jenu	81.61	50,163	55,363	59,966	Beji	17	62352
35.23.13	Merakurak	103.77	54,293	58,781	62,549	Sambonggede	19	62355
35.23.08	Kerek	136.55	64,471	67,163	70,606	Jarorejo	17	62356
35.23.06	Tambakboyo	72.97	38,529	42,137	43,380	Tambakboyo	18	62353
35.23.02	Jatirogo	111.98	52,564	55,534	58,964	Wotsogo	18	62362
35.23.04	Bancar	112.36	54,965	58,241	61,196	Bancar	24	62354
	Totals	1,839.94	1,118,464	1,198,012	1,272,898	Tuban	328	

Notes: (a) including one kelurahan (Panyuran). (b) including 2 kelurahan (Gedongombo and Karang).
(c) comprising 14 kelurahan (Baturetno, Doromukti, Karangsari, Kebonsari, Kingking, Kutorejo, Latsari, Mondokan, Perbon, Ronggomulyo, Sendangharjo, Sidomulyo, Sidorejo and Sukolilo) and 3 desa.
