= Jamboree 2008 =

Jamboree 2008 may refer to:

- Jamboree 2008 (Ireland)
- Jamboree 2008 (Northumberland)
