= Jambo (disambiguation) =

Jambo is a gorilla who used to reside at Jersey Zoo.

Jambo may also refer to:

== Music ==
- "Jambo" (The Adventure song), the official song of the 21st World Scout Jamboree
- "Jambo" (Takagi & Ketra song), 2019 song featuring Omi and Giusy Ferreri
- Jambo (album), a 1992 album by Osibisa
- Jambo, a band that includes Melinda McGraw and family members

== Other uses ==
- Jambo (greeting), a Swahili greeting
- Jambo Bukoba, a charity in Germany with strong links to Tanzania
- Jambo (card game), a card game from Germany
- Jambo Creek, a right tributary of the East Twin River, Wisconsin, US
- Jacques Vieau was called Jambo by Native Americans. Jambo Creek is named after him
- Jambo (TV series), a 1969-71 U.S. TV series by Ivan Tors
- Jambo, a slang word for a supporter or player of Heart of Midlothian F.C.
- Jambo OpenOffice, the first office suite in Swahili, based on OpenOffice.org
- Jambo Bolton, a fictional character in the British soap opera Hollyoaks
- Jamboo, a Tamil-language film

== People with the surname ==
- Suzanne Jambo, South Sudanese politician

== See also ==
- "Jambo Bwana", a 1982 Swahili song composed by Kenyan musician Teddy Kalanda Harrison
