= Suzanne Jambo =

South Sudanese politician and human rights campaigner

- Occupations: Politician and human rights campaigner

Suzanne Jambo is a South Sudanese politician, lawyer, and human rights campaigner.

== Education ==
Suzanne Jambo earned a degree in public law from the University of Buckingham, United Kingdom.

== Career and politics ==
Jambo has been an active human rights campaigner in South Sudan (and southern Sudan before that) for many years. She was a negotiator in the Intergovernmental Authority on Development-led peace process between 1998 and 2005, that resulted in the signing of the Comprehensive Peace Agreement in 2005, ending 21 years of civil war. She worked with numerous local non-governmental organisations (NGOs) in southern Sudan to improve their administration, efficiency and size. She was particularly involved in those organisations that sought to protect women's rights. In 2001, she authored the book Overcoming gender conflict and bias: the case of New Sudan women and girls.

She founded the New Sudanese Indigenous Network (NESI), an organisation to bring together 20 Sudanese NGOs to work on common issues such as women's rights, post-conflict rebuilding, human rights and democracy. By 2007 NESI was working with 67 separate NGOs in the region. Jambo was appointed a commissioner for the Southern Sudan Law Drafting Commission which drafted the 2005 Constitution of the interim period, CPA of southern Sudan, 2005-2011.

For an eight-year period, Jambo was the SPLM Secretary for External Relations under the chairmanship of the current South Sudan president Salva Kiir chairman of the Sudan People's Liberation Movement (SPLM) where Jambo served as external relations secretary from 2008 - 2015. She was the first female to act as a secretary during the interim period and through to South Sudan’s Independence in 2011. She served in the same capacity until at least 2013 when she complained about lack of organisation and internal democracy in the SPLM as it is the ruling party.

In 2018, Suzanne won the Mandela prize for peace for her efforts in advocating for women rights.

She also disagreed with Mayardit over the appointment of his brother-in-law, Gregory Deng Kuac Aduol, as governor of Gogrial State rather than holding elections. As a result, Jambo is now a political opponent of the president. In October 2017, she announced her intention to stand for the presidency in the next South Sudanese general election. Jambo is the first female to run as a presidential candidate in South Sudan.
