= Nganjuk Regency =

Regency in East Java, Indonesia

Nganjuk Regency Kabupaten Nganjuk
- Regency

Other transcription(s)
  - Javanese: Nganjuk (Gêdrig) ڠانجوك (Pégon) ꦔꦚ꧀ꦗꦸꦏ꧀ (Hånåcåråkå)
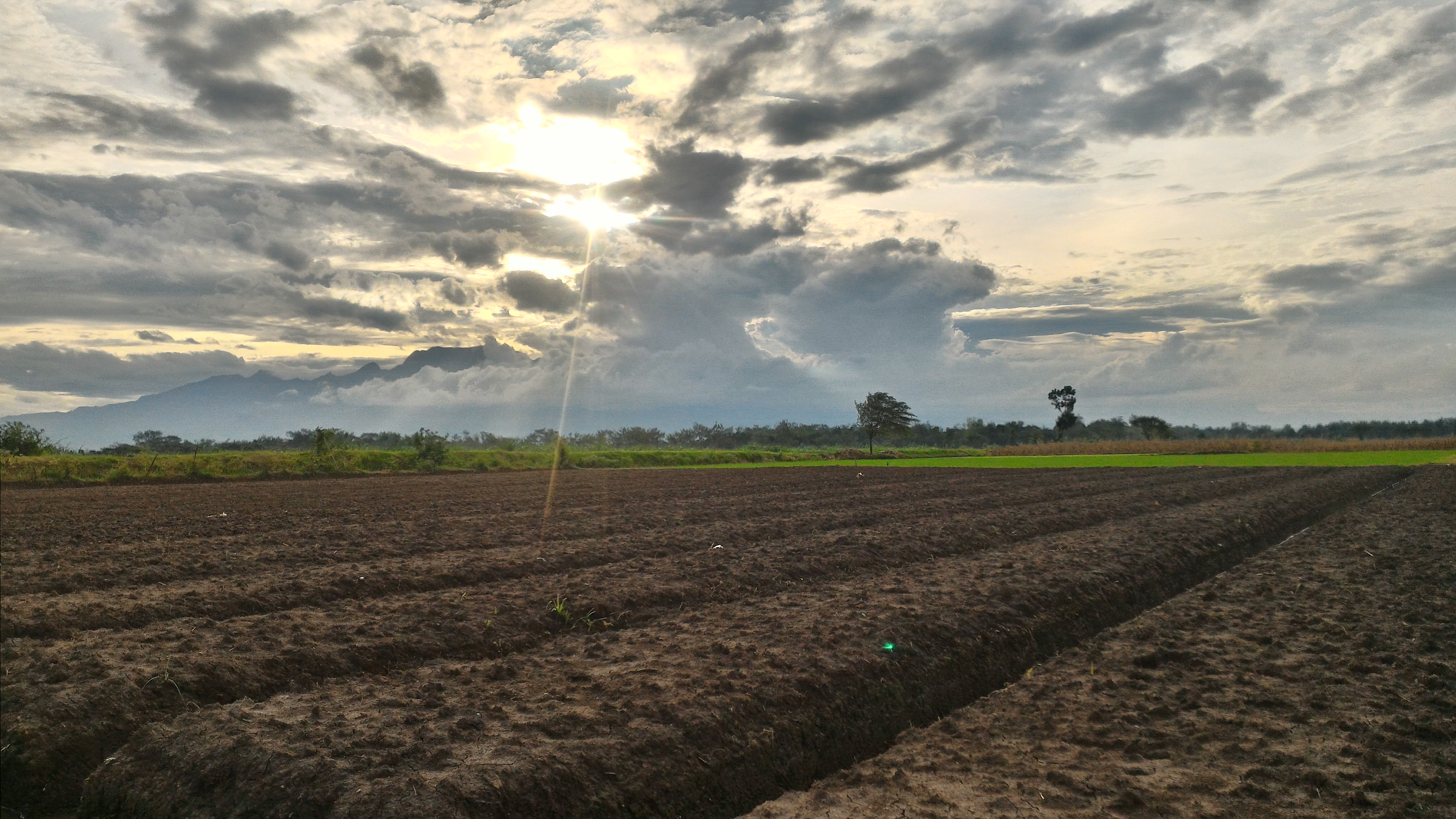
- Shallot Field in Nganjuk

- Coat of arms
- Motto: Baswara Yudhia Karana ("Shine by struggle")
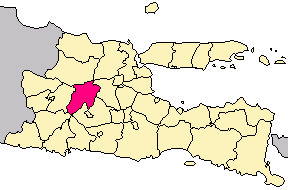
- Location within East Java

- Location in Java and Indonesia Nganjuk Regency (Indonesia)
- Coordinates: 7°36′S 111°55′E
- Country: Indonesia
- Province: East Java
- Capital: Nganjuk City

Government
  - Regent: Marhaen Djumadi
  - Vice Regent: Trihandy Cahyo Saputro

Area
  - Total: 1,289.07 km^{2} (497.71 sq mi)

Population (mid 2025 estimate)
  - Total: 1,154,896
  - Density: 895.914/km^{2} (2,320.41/sq mi)
- Time zone: UTC+7 (IWST)
- Area code: (+62) 358
- Website: nganjukkab.go.id

Nganjuk Regency (Javanese: ꦏꦧꦸꦥꦠꦺꦤ꧀ꦔꦚ꧀ꦗꦸꦏ꧀) is a landlocked regency (kabupaten) of East Java Province, Indonesia. It borders Bojonegoro Regency in the north, Jombang Regency in the east, Kediri Regency in the south and Madiun Regency in the west. It covers an area of 1,289.07 sq. km, and had a population of 1,017,030 at the 2010 Census and 1,103,902 at the 2020 Census; the official estimate as at mid 2025 was 1,154,896 (comprising 580,429 males and 574,467 females). The administrative centre of the regency is the town of Nganjuk. The current regent is Dr. Drs. H. Marhaen Djumadi, S.E., S.H., M.M., M.B.A.

== Administrative districts ==
The Regency is divided into twenty districts (kecamatan), tabulated below with their areas and their population totals from the 2010 Census and the 2020 Census, together with the official estimates as of mid 2025. The table also includes the location of the district headquarters and the number of administrative villages and subdistricts in each district (totaling 264 rural desa and 20 urban kelurahan), and its postcodes.

Kode Wilayah	Name of District (kecamatan)	Area in km^{2}	Pop'n Census 2010	Pop'n Census 2020	Pop'n Estimate mid 2025	Admin centre	No. of villages	Post codes
35.18.01	Sawahan	111.45	36,015	38,670	40,430	Sawahan	9	64475
35.18.02	Ngetos	78.45	34,112	37,574	39,957	Ngetos	9	64474
35.18.03	Berbek	57.52	53,732	58,955	61,131	Berbek	19	64473
35.18.04	Loceret	68.68	68,909	75,315	78,790	Loceret	22	64471
35.18.05	Pace	51.07	58,983	65,706	69,382	Pace	18	64472 ^{(a)}
35.18.11	Tanjunganom	75.58	108,631	117,014	121,863	Tanjunganom	16 ^{(b)}	64482
35.18.06	Prambon	44.96	68,524	72,788	75,826	Prambon	14	64484
35.18.07	Ngronggot	52.96	75,084	83,038	87,348	Ngronggot	13	64395
35.18.08	Kertosono	24.81	52,405	56,182	57,385	Kertosono	14 ^{(c)}	64311: 64315
35.18.09	Patianrowo	35.15	40,890	44,370	46,481	Patianrowo	11	64391
35.18.10	Baron	40.06	48,069	54,068	56,708	Baron	11	64394
35.18.17	Gondang	114.24	50,027	55,026	58,126	Gondang	17	64451
35.18.12	Sukomoro	37.56	41,566	45,988	48,912	Sukomoro	12 ^{(d)}	64481
35.18.13	Nganjuk	23.50	65,917	69,011	71,483	Nganjuk	15 ^{(e)}	64411: 64419
35.18.14	Bagor	54.38	56,753	61,181	64,306	Bagor	21 ^{(f)}	64461
35.18.15	Wilangan	51.47	26,910	30,222	31,812	Wilangan	6	64462
35.18.16	Rejoso	156.91	66,167	71,347	74,408	Rejoso	24	64453
35.18.18	Ngluyu	72.03	13,688	14,160	14,616	Ngluyu	6	64452
35.18.19	Lengkong	89.82	31,212	32,998	34,632	Lengkong	16	64393
35.18.20	Jatikalen	48.30	19,436	20,289	21,300	Jatikalen	11	64392
	Totals	1,289.07	1,017,030	1,103,902	1,154,896	Nganjuk	284	

Notes: (a) except the desa of Gondang, which has a postcode of 64451. (b) including 2 kelurahan (Tanjunganom and Warujayeng).
(c) including one kelurahan (Banaran). (d) including 2 kelurahan (Kapas and Sukomoro).
(e) comprising 13 kelurahan (Begadung, Bogo, Cangkringan, Ganungkidul, Jatirejo, Kartoharjo, Kauman, Kramat, Mangundikaran, Payaman, Ploso, Ringinanom and Werungotok) and 2 desa.
(f) including 2 kelurahan (Guyangan and Kedondong).

== Climate ==
Nganjuk has a tropical savanna climate (Aw) with moderate to little rainfall from May to October and heavy rainfall from November to April. The following climate data is for the city of Nganjuk.

Climate data for Nganjuk
Month	Jan	Feb	Mar	Apr	May	Jun	Jul	Aug	Sep	Oct	Nov	Dec	Year
Mean daily maximum °C (°F)	29.5 (85.1)	29.6 (85.3)	29.9 (85.8)	30.7 (87.3)	31.0 (87.8)	31.1 (88.0)	31.2 (88.2)	31.8 (89.2)	32.8 (91.0)	32.8 (91.0)	32.0 (89.6)	30.2 (86.4)	31.1 (87.9)
Daily mean °C (°F)	25.6 (78.1)	25.7 (78.3)	25.8 (78.4)	26.3 (79.3)	26.3 (79.3)	25.9 (78.6)	25.6 (78.1)	25.9 (78.6)	26.8 (80.2)	27.1 (80.8)	27.0 (80.6)	25.9 (78.6)	26.2 (79.1)
Mean daily minimum °C (°F)	21.7 (71.1)	21.8 (71.2)	21.8 (71.2)	21.9 (71.4)	21.6 (70.9)	20.8 (69.4)	20.1 (68.2)	20.1 (68.2)	20.9 (69.6)	21.5 (70.7)	22.0 (71.6)	21.7 (71.1)	21.3 (70.4)
Average rainfall mm (inches)	298 (11.7)	290 (11.4)	284 (11.2)	177 (7.0)	111 (4.4)	60 (2.4)	30 (1.2)	13 (0.5)	15 (0.6)	45 (1.8)	143 (5.6)	276 (10.9)	1,742 (68.7)
Source: Climate-Data.org

== Notable people ==
- Shendy Puspa Irawati, badminton player
- Harmoko, Former chairman of People's Representative Council in the Era of President Soeharto
- Erni Suyanti Musabine, veterinarian involved in the conservation of Sumatran tigers
