= Chris Jarvis (presenter) =

British actor, presenter and writer (born 1969)

- Born: Martin Christopher Jarvis; 20 April 1969 (age 57); Romford, East London, England
- Occupations: Actor, broadcaster for BBC Radio Solent, director, impressionist, presenter, writer

Martin Christopher Jarvis (born 20 April 1969) is an English actor, television/radio presenter and writer who has appeared mainly on children's television for the BBC since 1993, apart from 2000 to 2002 when he was working with ITV and Channel 4. Jarvis currently presents for BBC Radio Solent.

== Early life ==
Jarvis was born 20 April 1969 and grew up in Billericay and Brentwood.

== Career ==
=== Early career ===
Jarvis made his name in the early 1990s on Children's BBC, presenting from the "Broom Cupboard" alongside Zoe Ball and Josie d'Arby, as well as hosting his own shows like Look Sharp. Jarvis wrote a lot of material for Children's BBC himself (including the mini soap opera Wood Lane TV) and created several memorable characters, including "The Anorak".

In 1997, Jarvis was part of The Friday Zone (which was broadcast on Friday afternoons on BBC One for most of the children's slot) with Debra Stephenson, Peter Simon, Dominic Wood, Steve Rock and Emma Lee. They released a single called "Glasses" as a spin-off from the programme, to raise money for Comic Relief.

Jarvis then presented Fully Booked with Tim Vincent and Gail Porter for a few years. He has appeared on many other TV shows including Short Change, Exclusive, Playdays and Soap Fever.

Since 2025, Chris has regularly acted as a stand-in presenter on BBC Radio Solent broadcasting to Hampshire, Dorset and the Isle of Wight, covering Katie Martin on the Daytime programme and Rick Jackson In the Afternoon.

=== CBeebies ===
Jarvis was one of the original lineup of CBeebies presenters, alongside Pui Fan Lee, Sidney Sloane, and Sue Monroe every day. From March 2007 until his departure on 2 January 2009, he presented alongside Lee from 9:00 am to 3:00 pm with Discover and Do, then the Bedtime Hour from 6:00 pm and again on BBC Two in the mornings. He also starred in Step Inside as Mr Mopple and voiced characters in Underground Ernie. In 2009, he and Lee left the channel's main presentation to create Show Me Show Me.

Show Me Show Me is still broadcast on CBeebies today. The first 40 half-hour episodes were broadcast on the CBeebies channel, BBC One and BBC Two from Monday 6 July 2009 every weekday at 10:00 am and 1:30 pm. Series 5 was filmed on location near Manchester in 2013.

From 2010 to 2017, Jarvis and Lee toured the UK with The Chris and Pui Roadshow.

In 2019, he started a radio station for children called Little Radio. In 2023, Jarvis took over the role of Robert the Robot in Justin's House from Steven Kynman.

=== Acting ===
As an actor, Jarvis has appeared in The Demon Headmaster and ChuckleVision, and played Mr Mopple in the early CBeebies story-telling programme Step Inside. He also presented Maths Mansion.

=== Music ===
Jarvis hosts family concerts for the London Philharmonic Orchestra and the BBC Philharmonic.

=== Pantomime ===
Jarvis has appeared in pantomimes professionally every year since 1995, and prior to that had performed in several as an amateur. Since 2001, he has written and directed many of these pantomimes.

- 1995 Aladdin, Guildford – Bernie Nolan, Clare Buckfield, Jack Douglas, Richard Gibson
- 1996 Aladdin, Richmond – Bonnie Langford, Bernard Cribbins, Terrence Hardiman
- 1997 Jack & the Beanstalk, Bromley – Matthew Kelly, Vicki Michelle, Toyah Willcox, Robert Duncan
- 1998 Cinderella, Lewisham – Linda Robson, Femi Oke
- 1999 Peter Pan, Reading – Derek Griffiths, Hilary O'Neil
- 2000 Jack & the Beanstalk, Croydon – Kate Ritchie
- 2001 Cinderella, Malvern – Marti Webb, Nicholas Smith
- 2002 Cinderella, Bournemouth – Ruth Madoc, Nicholas Smith
- 2003 Cinderella, Basingstoke – Sarah Thomas, Michael Knowles
- 2004 Jack & the Beanstalk, Bournemouth – Chris Ellison, Tom Owen, Jacki Piper
- 2005 Aladdin, Bournemouth – Ray Meagher, Mark Squires
- 2006 Snow White, Tunbridge Wells – Carol Harrison, Richard Calkin
- 2007 Snow White, Basingstoke – Carol Harrison, Tom Owen
- 2008 Cinderella, Swansea – Su Pollard, Sarah Thomas
- 2009 Snow White at the Pavilion Theatre, Bournemouth with Su Pollard
- 2010 Cinderella, at the Pavilion Theatre, Bournemouth with Amanda Barrie
- 2011 Jack & the Beanstalk at the Pavilion Theatre, Bournemouth with Debra Stephenson, Brian Capron, Nick Wilton and Kate Weston
- 2012 Sleeping Beauty at the Pavilion Theatre, Bournemouth with Su Pollard
- 2013 Aladdin at the Pavilion Theatre, Bournemouth with Scott Maslen, Bobby Crush, Nick Khan, Jennifer Saayeng, Richard Vincent, Jamie-Lee Mason
- 2014 Snow White, Richmond Theatre – Jerry Hall
- 2015 Cinderella, Richmond Theatre
- 2016 Sleeping Beauty, Richmond Theatre
- 2017 Jack and the Beanstalk, Wycombe Swan Theatre with Simon Webbe and Ashleigh Butler
- 2018 Dick Whittington, Poole Lighthouse with Richard Gibson
- 2019 Sleeping Beauty, Swindon Wyvern with Michelle Collins
- 2020 Puss in Boots, Tiring Production with Suzanne Shaw
- 2021 Beauty & the Beast, Poole Lighthouse
- 2022 Cinderella, Poole Lighthouse with Tyger Drew-Honey, Alim Jadavji, Andrew Pollard, Charlotte Wood and Lauren Azania
- 2023 Aladdin Poole Lighthouse
- 2024 Sleeping Beauty Poole Lighthouse
- 2025 Dick Whittington Poole Lighthouse

Jarvis has been involved with several televised pantomimes on CBeebies, including 2012's Jack and the Beanstalk, which he wrote and starred in as Dame Trot, 2011's Strictly Cinderella, which he co-wrote, and starred in as Baron Hardup, 2010's Aladdin (in which he plays Emperor Sho Mee) and 2009's Jack & Jill (which he wrote and made a cameo appearance in).

== Filmography ==
List of acting and presenting performances in film and television
| Title | Year | Role | Notes |
|---|---|---|---|
| The Broom Cupboard | 1993–1997 | Presenter | |
| Look Sharp | 1994–1995 | Presenter | 2 series |
| The Anorak | 1994–1996 | Actor | |
| Get Your Own Back | 1995 | Himself | |
| Playdays | 1995 | Presenter | 2 series |
| Wood Lane TV | 1995–1997 | Actor / Writer | |
| To Me... To You... | 1996, 1998 | Himself | |
| The Demon Headmaster Takes Over TV | 1997 | Himself | TV film, played a fictionalised version of himself |
| The Friday Zone | 1997 | Presenter | CBBC |
| The Demon Headmaster | 1998 | Your Wildest Dreams host | |
| Mr Wymi | 1998 | Hacker tracker | |
| ChuckleVision | 1998 | Head page | |
| Short Change | 1998 | Presenter | |
| Fully Booked | 1998–2000 | Presenter | 2 series |
| ChuckleVision Comic Relief Special | 1999 | Music Mogul | |
| Night Fever | 1999 | Himself | |
| Dream Street | 1999–2002 | Hot Rodney / Amber / Scarlet | |
| Catchphrase | 2000–2001 | Himself | Voice role |
| Jungle Run | 2001–2002 | Presenter | |
| Maths Mansion | 2001–2003 | Sad Man / Bad Man | |
| Step Inside | 2002 | Mr Mopple | |
| CBeebies | 2002–2009 | Presenter | Presented links between programmes |
| Planet Cook | 2004–2005 | | |
| Underground Ernie | 2006 | Circle / City | Voice role |
| Show Me Show Me | 2009–2015 | Presenter | |
| Justin's House | 2023 | Robert The Robot | |
