= Let's Play (disambiguation) =

A Let's Play is a type of video game walkthrough with commentary.

Let's Play may also refer to:

== TV and gaming ==
- Let's Play, a 2025 anime by OLM based on the webcomic Let's Play.
- LetsPlay, a YouTube channel run by Rooster Teeth
- Let's Play (TV series), a children's television series broadcast on CBeebies
- "Let's Play!", an episode of Desperate Housewives

== Music ==
- Let's Play (album), a 1991 album by Larry Willis
- Let's Play!, a 2002 children's music album by Raffi
- Let Us Play!, a 1997 album by Coldcut
- "Let's Play", a song and single by Kristina Maria

== Other ==
- Let's Play (comic), a web comic on Webtoons and later Tapas
- Let's Play, a 1931 comedy short film with Slim Summerville and Tom Kennedy
