= Pui Fan Lee =

English actress

- Born: 14 July 1971 (age 55); Birmingham, England
- Occupations: Actress; television presenter
- Known for: Po in Teletubbies
- Notable work: Teletubbies; CBeebies; Show Me Show Me

Pui Fan Lee (/ˈpɔɪ/; born 1969 or 1970) is an English actress and television presenter. She is known for portraying Po in the original run of the children's television series Teletubbies between 1997 and 2001, and for presenting the CBeebies preschool education series Show Me Show Me.

== Early life and education ==
Lee's family came from Hong Kong. She was born in Birmingham, and grew up in Nottingham, where her family helped to run a Chinese take-away.

== Career ==
She studied at the London Academy of Music and Dramatic Art (LAMDA), and once qualified, appeared in a number of TV shows before successfully applying and securing the role of Po in a new CBBC show called Teletubbies. Lee was not only the voice of the character, but also was inside the costume for 365 episodes between 1997 and 2001.

Along with Sue Monroe, Chris Jarvis, and Sidney Sloane, Lee was one of the first presenters on CBeebies, the BBC digital television channel for younger children. Lee, alongside Chris Jarvis, were the first presenters to introduce programming on the CBeebies channel.

In 2004, Lee had a minor role as a Thai jail girl in the 2004 film Bridget Jones: The Edge of Reason.

In 2006, she presented the BBC programme Fun with Phonics.

In 2019, she made a guest appearance in the British soap opera EastEnders.

From 2021-2023, she appeared as Su Ping Lam on HBO's The Nevers.

== Personal life ==
Lee lives in North London.
