= Playdays =

- Also known as: Playbus
- Genre: Animation
- Created by: Cynthia Felgate
- Developed by: Felgate Productions
- Written by: Simon Davies
- Directed by: Clare Bradley; Brian Jameson; Iain Lauchlan; Will Brenton; Helen Sheppard; Stephen Cannon; Adrian Hedley; Robin Carr; Leslie Pitt; Trevor Hill; Mark Pickett; Jamie Langton; Michelle Jones; Philip Hawthorn
- Presented by: Brian Jameson; Simon Davies; Zoe Ball; Vanessa Amberleigh; Nick Baker; Elizabeth Fost; Floella Benjamin; Colin Kerrigan; Dave Benson Phillips; Liz Kitchen; Dyanne White; Philip Hawthorn; Stephen Cannon; Chris Jarvis; Andrew Lynford; Stuart Bradley; Liz Watts; Will Brenton; Iain Lauchlan; Sue Monroe; Sarah Davison; Robin Fritz; Clive Duncan; Andy Hockley; Nick Mercer (presenter Michele Durler; Jonny Griffiths; Sonali Shah; Teresa Gallagher; Peter Quilter; Neil Bett; Paul Hawkyard; Royce Hounsell; Trish Cooke; Karl Woolley; Alex Lovell
- Voices of: Fiona Benyon Brown; Ellie Darvill; Sue Monroe; Sally Preisig
- Theme music composer: Richard Brown
- Composers: Jonathan Cohen; Kim Goody; Liz Kitchen; Graham Pike; Alex Matthias; Andrew Dodge
- Country of origin: United Kingdom
- Original language: English
- No. of series: 9
- No. of episodes: 1174

Production
- Executive producers: Cynthia Felgate; Andrew Thomas
- Producers: Clare Bradley; Penny Lloyd; Barbara Roddam; Anne Reay; Michael Cole; Ann Gobey; Kate Marlow; Will Brenton
- Production location: Capital Group Studios
- Running time: 20 minutes
- Production company: Felgate Productions

Original release
- Network: BBC One and BBC Two
- Release: 17 October 1988 – 28 March 1997

Related
- Play School

Playdays (known as Playbus until December 1989) is a British pre-school television programme which ran from 17 October 1988 to 28 March 1997 on Children's BBC. The show was the successor to Play School and, like its predecessor, was designed as an educational programme.

The show's name was changed after the BBC received a complaint from the National Playbus Association.

In 2002, reruns were moved to the new CBeebies channel until late August 2004.

== The stops ==
The show begins with an animated title sequence of the Playbus driving along until it reached the bus stop. The bus stopped at a different place each day.

=== Monday – The Why Bird Stop ===
Why Bird lived at the Lost Property Office, where things that were left on the Playbus were filed until someone claimed them. She interacted with the human bus driver – there were several throughout the series. She had a special computer called the Why-Tech, which had a variety of uses: it could provide music for songs, pictures for stories, instructions for making something in keeping with the programme's theme, or to help sing a song (e.g. paper sugar buns for Five Currant Buns). In later episodes, the office became more like a warehouse, called "Why's Workshop".

There were at least five different Why-Techs used over the years. The first one had a brown wood effect and was used until 1990. The second one was remote-controlled and used from about June 1990 until 1992. The third one that was first appeared in episode 105 from June 1992 was blue and continued to be used in the opening credits until the end of the series' run although it was replaced with another blue one a few months later.

It also showed videos, usually to show how everyday things were made – socks, toothbrushes etc. Sometimes either Peggy or Poppy or both visited the Lost Property Office. In a later series the office installed a telephone where people (usually Peggy or Poppy), could phone in asking for particular things (examples include information about spiders and a nighttime picture to help someone sleep during the day). Why Bird was voiced and puppeteered by Ellie Darvill for 9 series.

Bus Drivers

- Brian Jameson
- Simon Davies
- Simon Harbrow
- Stuart Bradley
- Matthew White
- Paul Hawkyard
- Philip Hawthorn
- Royce Hounsell
- Charlie Grindle (played by Nick Mercer)

=== Tuesday – The Playground Stop ===
A variety of different things were involved. The programme always opened with the presenter (several, including Dave Benson Phillips and Elizabeth Fost), saying, "Boys and Girls, come out to play...", followed by the programme's theme, (e.g. "we're playing racing games today" or "we're doing things on time today"). The show featured a group of children doing activities, such as pretending to be cooks and making paper meals.

Dave was accompanied by a hand puppet named Chester. Elizabeth was also accompanied by a hand puppet called Ruby. The programme always featured a rhyme accompanied by Makaton sign language and a song performed by a marionette named Lizzie, who loved to sing and dance. She was occasionally accompanied by another marionette named Nick. There was also a story, often featuring Max and his magical chest of dressing-up clothes.

Presenters

- Dave Benson Phillips
- Elizabeth Watts
- Sue Monroe
- Elizabeth Fost
- Zoe Ball
- Chris Jarvis

=== Wednesday – The Dot Stop (1988–1992) / The Roundabout Stop (1992–1997) ===
The non-speaking Dot, played by Rebecca Higgins, had fun with music or numbers. Later, there were three Dots: "The Dot who plays the violin" (Eithne Hannigan), "The Dot who plays the drums" (Liz Kitchen) and "The Dot you can count on" (Dyanne White). Sometimes, a puppet called Dash would appear and squirm its way through holes in the set. It had a song: "Not number one, not number two, not number three or four, not number five, not number six, only one Dash can do tricks!" Another pair of puppet friends were Professor Mopp and his blue dog Morgan. The Violinist and Counting Dots had a sidekick called Mr Domino (played by Stephen Cannon, and later by Peter Gunn). The Dot who plays the drums was accompanied by Domino the Musical Monkey.

It was later replaced by the Roundabout Stop (which had followed on from a week of fairground programmes shown in 1990), presented by Mr. Jolly (first played by Iain Lauchlan for a Tent Stop style story before the first main Mr Jolly, Robin Fritz), who maintained a fairground carousel called Rosie, whose platform initially did not have any objects to ride on. The show featured Bitsy Bob (played by Michele Durler), who played music and made things, and initially, Bella and Baxter the Numbears, followed by puppets Morris Cog and Milly Sprocket (puppeteered by Nick Mercer and Michele Durler), who presented a segment called "Morris and Milly's Numerical Melodies", where they sang a song glorifying a particular number. The Roundabout Stop also played host to an array of extra visitors to help with Rosie's puzzles, including, but not limited to, Rhythm Man (David Rubin), Dilys Litefoot (Teresa Gallagher), Paul Morocco, Allesandro Bernardi, Morton McKewan (Iain Lauchlan), Gladys Tootle (Sarah Davison) and Leaping Lindy (Caroline Hinds).

Children from local schools and organisations such as Chickenshed helped with the puzzles and performed the song at the end of the programme. Also joining Mr. Jolly occasionally were Professor Mopp and Morgan from the Dot Stop. During the time Clive Duncan played Mr. Jolly, the team was later joined by the musician Charlie Grindle (played by Nick Mercer), who also appeared as one of the bus drivers from The Why Bird Stop. Charlie often sang songs for them, as well.

The main body of the episode featured the characters finding different shaped pictures; these came together to form the title of a nursery rhyme or song, which was performed by the entire cast at the end of the episode. In later episodes (1995 to 1997), Mr Jolly was played by Andy Hockley. Rosie's platform bore a tractor, a ship, an aeroplane and a car. These episodes featured Peggy, Poppy and Why Bird, who rode on the roundabout and went off on adventures (but in some episodes only Peggy and Why went on adventures, so on the third shape, they would both go together). Due to Peggy's small size in comparison to Why Bird and Poppy, she would typically ride the ship or the tractor on the roundabout so that she could sit astride the vehicle's funnel, as it meant she could be seen better.

At the start and end of each adventure, Mr. Jolly would sing the song "Roll Up and Ride on Rosie". A picture associated with the adventure appeared in their shaped ticket (purple circle, red square, pink triangle, yellow diamond, green arch or blue rectangle), and these would combine to make the song, which ended the episode.

A special 40-minute, direct-to-video special called Winter Adventure was released in 1997. The special saw Mr. Jolly, again played by Andy Hockley, with Poppy, Why Bird and Peggy visiting a cottage for the weekend. Poppy was now puppeteered by Colleen Daley, and Peggy was puppeteered by Paula Everett. Darvill continued her role as Why Bird.

=== Thursday – The Patch Stop ===
Featuring Sam Patch, a small scarecrow doll and later replaced by Peggy Patch, a small rag doll who were both very kind natured. Sam and later Peggy would often travel places. From 1992 onwards Peggy would leave clues for children to find her and she would also be joined by Parsnip (a brown rabbit) who first appeared about 1992–94, Poppy and/or Why Bird later in the episode. She was originally non-speaking, but gained a voice (Sally Preisig) in 1994. Presenters included Vanessa Amberleigh, Colin Kerrigan, Adrian Scarborough, Ian Henderson, Sarah Davison, Chris Jarvis, Teresa Gallagher, Neil Bett and Peter Quilter.

=== Friday – The Tent Stop (1988–1995) / The Poppy Stop (1995–1997) ===
A group of actors, including Trish Cooke, Ricky Diamond, Robert Hopkins, Will Brenton, Sue Monroe and Sarah Davison, would dress up, and with the help of a group of children, perform a play or show. Humphrey, a unicyclist puppet, and Wobble, a roly-poly clown also took part in the stories and they sometimes accompanied Lizzie for her songs (see The Playground Stop).

When the stop became the Poppy Stop, the setting was at Poppy the cat's house, typically presented by Karl Woolley. Why Bird, Peggy Patch and other characters would often also appear in episodes at Poppy's house.

At Christmas from 1989–91, the Playbus would stop at The Christmas Tree Stop. These special episodes featured characters from all the usual stops.

== Live shows ==
Playdays went on various tours around the UK during its run. The shows often saw all of the puppet characters coming together. Unlike the show, Peggy Patch was played by a live actor. Many of the characters were also portrayed by different actors when compared to the television series.

== Episodes ==
1. Humphrey's Hats (9 December 1988)
2. Diana's Den (16 December 1988)
3. The Great Cake-Eating Mystery (30 December 1988)
4. Anansi Goes Fishing (6 January 1989)
5. The Rajah's Ears (3 February 1989)
6. In the Land of Nod (10 February 1989)
7. Noah and His Ark (17 February 1989)
8. A Surprise for Cherry and Sam (17 March 1989)
9. Neptune's Band (24 March 1989)
10. Twtyn (22 June 1989)
11. The Special Pets (26 June 1989)
12. Spondooliks and the Dragon (27 June 1989)
13. Helynt Caradog (29 June 1989)
14. Being Helpful (30 June 1989)
15. Mrs Beddoe and the Bus (3 July 1989)
16. Sionyn y Llwynog (6 July 1989)
17. Ready, Steady, Go (7 July 1989)
18. Which Witch (14 July 1989)
19. If You Give a Mouse a Cookie (17 July 1989)
20. Spondooliks and the Maze (18 July 1989)
21. Party Hats and Pantaloons (21 July 1989)
22. The Day Henry Discovered the Echo (24 July 1989)
23. Spondooliks and the Spell Crystals (25 July 1989)
24. The Dancing Class (28 July 1989)
25. The Boy Who Wanted to Talk to Animals (31 July 1989)
26. Spondooliks and the Wizzywig (1 August 1989)
27. Dangerous Dan (4 August 1989)
28. The New Glasses (7 August 1989)
29. The Painted Duck (11 August 1989)
30. Poot and the Giant (15 August 1989)
31. The Yellow-Spotted Mystery (18 August 1989)
32. Come Back Hercules (24 August 1989)
33. When Willy Went to the Wedding (31 August 1989)
34. Thunderstorms and Rainbows (1 September 1989)
35. A Dog for Ben (7 September 1989)
36. Arthur (14 September 1989)
37. The Second-Floor Cat (21 September 1989)
38. A Prize for Percival (28 September 1989)
39. Sheepchase (5 October 1989)
40. Wilhelmina Workworth and the Ice-Cream (16 October 1989)
41. Daisy and the Washing Machine (17 October 1989)
42. The Wizard of the East (18 October 1989)
43. Bernie the Rabbit Goes Missing (20 October 1989)
44. Purnima's Parrot (24 October 1989)
45. The Wizard of the West (25 October 1989)
46. The Lesser-Known Jungle Monkey Bird (3 November 1989)
47. Oswald T Octopus (27 November 1989)
48. Piggo and the Yoghurt Pot (24 May 1990)
49. The Jug (28 May 1990)
50. Flamenco Fish (4 June 1990)
51. Harry the Dirty Dog (6 June 1990)
52. Gobstoppers (8 June 1990)
53. Rosie's Train Ride (11 June 1990)
54. Dilly Goes Swamp Wallowing (12 June 1990)
55. Professor Harry Iffit (2 July 1990)
56. Big Gerald (9 July 1990)
57. Dilly Goes Missing (10 July 1990)
58. Matt's Mask (16 July 1990)
59. The Blob (23 July 1990)
60. Dilly and the Birthday Treat (24 July 1990)
61. Carrie's Rhinoceros Nose (30 July 1990)

== VHS releases ==
Title	Release date
Playbus – Animated Alphabet BBCV 4282	2 October 1989
Playdays – Days by the Sea BBCV 4770	6 April 1992
Playdays – Days on the Move BBCV 4769	6 April 1992
Playdays – Animated Alphabet Re-Release BBCV 4282	6 April 1992
Playdays – Dot's Fun with Numbers BBCV 4946	5 April 1993
Playdays – Lizzie's Singalong BBCV 4190	3 May 1993
Playdays – Lizzie and Friends BBCV 5248	5 April 1994
Playdays – 2 – on 1 BBCV 6296	7 July 1997
Playdays – Winter Adventure	3 November 1997

Magazines, books, audio tapes and PC games were also produced during its run.
