= The Shiny Show =

British educational children's quiz show

- Created by: Chris Ellis
- Written by: Chris Ellis; Philip Hawthorn; Alan MacDonald; Alison Stewart
- Directed by: Philip Hawthorn; Helen Sheppard
- Starring: Sue Monroe; Sally Preisig; Sam Mason; Wim Booth
- Theme music composer: Archie Brown
- Composer: Archie Brown
- Country of origin: United Kingdom
- No. of series: 2
- No. of episodes: 91

Production
- Camera setup: Multi-Camera
- Running time: 20 minutes per episode (approx.)
- Production company: Open Mind Productions

Original release
- Network: CBeebies
- Release: 11 February – 30 July 2002

The Shiny Show is a British educational children's quiz show, broadcast in the United Kingdom by CBeebies, and produced by Open Mind Productions. It was aired in 2002. Each show featured a quiz with six questions, based around different subjects, and featured four star characters: Tigs the Tiger, Mukka the Monkey, Dogsby the Dog and Alarmorama the machine.

== Characters ==
=== Tigs ===
Tigs is an orange tiger, who is often portrayed as confident and big-headed. She is still extremely lively and always gets the starring role in the short plays or poems the group act out in between rounds. She has a lucky object called Mr. Cheese, a plastic lump of cheese that squeaks whenever it is squeezed. Voiced by Sue Monroe. Tigs’ puppet was changed at the start of season 2, however the old puppet still appeared in the theme song.

=== Mukka ===
Mukka is an extremely hyperactive purple monkey. He has a lucky object called Fluffy Stuff and a pet lump called Lumpy. Voiced by Wim Booth.

=== Dogsby ===
Dogsby is a brown dog, the most sensible member of the group, and usually stays calm in most circumstances. Dogsby's lucky object is a purple and yellow hat named Lucky Hat, which Dogsby never wears because if he wears it he "might get too lucky!". Dogsby loves cabbages, and is also not very good at getting colours right. Voiced by Sally Preisig (series 1), Sam Mason (series 2) and Liz Fost (one-off Christmas CBeebies appearance).

=== Alarmorama ===
Alarmorama (often mentioned by Dogsby, Mukka and Tigs) is a toy machine situated on one of the walls in the living room. Although Alarmorama does not speak, it communicates using various noises. Alarmorama does many actions, including:

- Playing the show's theme song, and then starting the show.
- Choosing the quizzer – the person who will ask all the questions for a particular episode of the show.
- Playing the quizzer's song.
- Starting rounds.
- Giving the shinies and the Super Shiny to the audience at home.
- Waving with one hand from side to side, as if to say "Goodbye", to indicate the end of the show.

== Overview ==
There are three rounds in the quiz, each with a short film in which the three animal contestants watch before answering the two questions. The aim of the game is to answer as many questions correctly as possible, and beat the other player(s). For every question you get correct you can "give yourself a shiny". The person who answers the most questions correctly wins the Super Shiny. If it ends in a draw then both players win the Super Shiny. The quizzer would always tell the viewer that if they got many questions right then they would be considered a winner, too.

In between the three rounds, the three animal characters, Dogsby the dog, Tigs the tiger and Mukka the monkey, act out a story or drama play loosely based around the theme of the films the quiz is based on.

== International broadcast ==
The show aired in a few countries. An Albanian-dubbed version of the show, called Shfaqja vezulluese, premiered on TV Klan in 2008 and had reruns until July 2013. Also, a Polish dub of the show, named Błyśnij-błyskula also aired on 2008 on CBeebies in Poland. There's also a Spanish-dubbed version called A Jugar y Adivinar.

== Episodes ==
=== Series 1 (2002) ===
#	Episode title	Writer	Quizzer	Shiny Score	Summary	Original airdate	Winner
1	Swimming Pool	Chris Ellis	Tigs	Round 1: 1-2; Round 2: 1-3; Round 3: 3-3	Tigs asks us questions about armbands, underwater swimming and flumes.	11 February 2002	Draw
2	The Beach	Chris Ellis	Dogsby	Round 1: 2-1; Round 2: 3-2; Round 3: 3-3	Dogsby asks us questions about sandcastles, sun block and the pier.	12 February 2002	Draw
3	Minibeasts	Chris Ellis	Mukka	Round 1: 2-2; Round 2: 3-4; Round 3: 3-5	Mukka asks us questions about worms, ants and spiders.	13 February 2002	Tigs
4	The Circus	Chris Ellis	Tigs	Round 1: 1-1; Round 2: 2-2; Round 3: 4-3	Tigs asks us questions about life at the circus.	14 February 2002	Dogsby
5	Pets	Chris Ellis	Dogsby	Round 1: 1-2; Round 2: 2-3; Round 3: 3-4	Dogsby asks us questions about dogs, cats and rabbits.	15 February 2002	Mukka
6	Aeroplanes	Chris Ellis	Mukka	Round 1: 1-2; Round 2: 2-3; Round 3: 3-3	Mukka asks us questions about aeroplanes.	16 February 2002	Draw
7	Fire Station	Chris Ellis	Tigs	Round 1: 1-1; Round 2: 2-2; Round 3: 4-3	Tigs asks us questions about life at a fire station.	17 February 2002	Dogsby
8	Hairdressers	Chris Ellis	Mukka	Round 1: 2-2; Round 2: 4-3; Round 3: 6-4	Mukka asks us questions about life at a hairdressing salon.	18 February 2002	Dogsby
9	Farm Animals	Chris Ellis	Dogsby	Round 1: 2-2; Round 2: 3-3; Round 3: 4-4	Dogsby asks us questions about chickens, sheep and pigs.	19 February 2002	Draw
10	Leisure Centre	Chris Ellis	Tigs	Round 1: 1-1; Round 2: 2-3; Round 3: 4-3	Tigs asks us questions about life at a leisure centre.	20 February 2002	Dogsby
11	The Seaside	Chris Ellis	Dogsby	Round 1: 1-2; Round 2: 3-3; Round 3: 5-4	Dogsby asks us questions about seaweed, crabs and cliffs.	21 February 2002	Tigs
12	Butterflies, Snails and Bees	Chris Ellis	Mukka	Round 1: 0-1; Round 2: 1-3; Round 3: 3-4	Mukka asks us questions about butterflies, snails and bees.	22 February 2002	Tigs
13	Circus Fun	Chris Ellis	Tigs	Round 1: 1-2; Round 2: 3-3; Round 3: 3-5	Tigs asks us questions about more life at the circus.	23 February 2002	Mukka
14	Interesting Pets	Chris Ellis	Dogsby	Round 1: 2-0; Round 2: 3-2; Round 3: 3-4	Dogsby asks us questions about fish, guinea pigs and birds.	24 February 2002	Mukka
15	Boats and Fishing	Chris Ellis	Mukka	Round 1: 1-1; Round 2: 2-2; Round 3: 2-4	Mukka asks us questions about boats and fishing.	25 February 2002	Tigs
16	Puppet Show	Chris Ellis	Tigs	Round 1: 1-1; Round 2: 2-2; Round 3: 4-3	Tigs asks us questions about life at a puppet theatre.	26 February 2002	Dogsby
17	Farm	Chris Ellis	Dogsby	Round 1: 1-2; Round 2: 2-2; Round 3: 4-3	Dogsby asks us questions about ponies, tractors and cows.	27 February 2002	Tigs
18	Pizza Restaurant	Chris Ellis	Mukka	Round 1: 2-1; Round 2: 2-3; Round 3: 4-3	Mukka asks us questions about how pizza is made.	28 February 2002	Dogsby
19	Nursery	Chris Ellis	Tigs	Round 1: 1-0; Round 2: 2-0; Round 3: 3-2	Tigs asks us questions about life at a nursery.	1 March 2002	Dogsby
20	Up and Down	Chris Ellis	Dogsby	Round 1: 1-0; Round 2: 2-1; Round 3: 2-2	Dogsby asks us questions about space hoppers, hot-air balloons, lifts and escalators.	2 March 2002	Draw
21	Garden	Chris Ellis	Mukka	Round 1: 1-2; Round 2: 3-3; Round 3: 3-4	Mukka asks us questions about seeds, flowers and trees.	3 March 2002	Tigs
22	Building Site	Chris Ellis	Tigs	Round 1: 1-1; Round 2: 2-2; Round 3: 3-2	Tigs asks us questions about building, diggers and cranes.	4 March 2002	Dogsby
23	Fun at the Fair	Chris Ellis	Dogsby	Round 1: 1-1; Round 2: 2-3; Round 3: 3-4	Dogsby asks us questions about candy floss, rollercoasters and the knock-the-cans-off-the-shelf game.	5 March 2002	Mukka
24	Making Things	Chris Ellis	Mukka	Round 1: 1-2; Round 2: 2-3; Round 3: 3-4	Mukka asks us questions about making things at a holiday club.	6 March 2002	Tigs
25	Wild Animals	Chris Ellis	Tigs	Round 1: 1-2; Round 2: 3-2; Round 3: 4-3	Tigs asks us questions about rhinos, meerkats and porcupines.	7 March 2002	Dogsby
26	Trains	Chris Ellis	Dogsby	Round 1: 1-2; Round 2: 2-3; Round 3: 3-3	Dogsby asks us questions about steam trains.	8 March 2002	Draw
27	Park	Chris Ellis	Mukka	Round 1: 2-1; Round 2: 3-2; Round 3: 4-3	Mukka asks us questions about ducks, ice lollies and kites.	8 March 2002	Dogsby
28	Rubbish Centre	Chris Ellis	Tigs	Round 1: 1-1; Round 2: 2-3; Round 3: 4-4	Tigs asks us questions about rubbish and recycling.	10 March 2002	Draw
29	Flowers and Growing Things	Chris Ellis	Dogsby	Round 1: 1-2; Round 2: 2-3; Round 3: 4-4	Dogsby asks us questions about greenhouse plants, raspberries and potatoes.	11 March 2002	Draw
30	Shopping	Chris Ellis	Mukka	Round 1: 1-0; Round 2: 1-2; Round 3: 3-3	Mukka asks us questions about toy shops, sweet shops and fancy dress shops.	12 March 2002	Draw
31	Building	Chris Ellis	Tigs	Round 1: 1-2; Round 2: 3-2; Round 3: 4-3	Tigs asks us questions about saws, pneumatic drills and cement.	13 March 2002	Dogsby
32	Funfair	Chris Ellis	Dogsby	Round 1: 1-1; Round 2: 1-3; Round 3: 2-5	Dogsby asks us questions about teacup rides, ghost trains and bumper cars.	14 March 2002	Mukka
33	Indian Food	Chris Ellis	Mukka	Round 1: 0-2; Round 2: 2-2; Round 3: 3-4	Mukka asks us questions about how Indian food is made.	15 March 2002	Tigs
34	Lemurs, Penguins and Giraffes	Chris Ellis	Tigs	Round 1: 1-1; Round 2: 3-2; Round 3: 4-3	Tigs asks us questions about lemurs, penguins and giraffes.	16 March 2002	Dogsby
35	Lorries	Chris Ellis	Dogsby	Round 1: 1-2; Round 2: 2-2; Round 3: 4-3	Dogsby asks us questions about lorries and forklift trucks.	17 March 2002	Tigs
36	Fun at the Park	Chris Ellis	Mukka	Round 1: 2-1; Round 2: 3-2; Round 3: 4-2	Mukka asks us questions about picnics, squirrels and frisbees.	18 March 2002	Dogsby
37	Musical Instruments	Chris Ellis	Tigs	Round 1: 1-1; Round 2: 3-2; Round 3: 4-3	Tigs asks us questions about flutes, drums and ouds.	19 March 2002	Dogsby
38	Party	Chris Ellis	Dogsby	Round 1: 1-1; Round 2: 2-1; Round 3: 3-3	Dogsby asks us questions about party food, face painting and magicians.	20 March 2002	Draw
39	Shopping Centre	Chris Ellis	Mukka	Round 1: 1-2; Round 2: 2-2; Round 3: 2-3	Mukka asks us questions about book shops, clothes shops and shoe shops.	21 March 2002	Tigs
40	Light and Dark	Chris Ellis	Tigs	Round 1: 2-2; Round 2: 3-2; Round 3: 4-3	Tigs asks us questions about light and dark.	22 March 2002	Dogsby

=== Series 2 (2002) ===
#	Episode title	Writer	Quizzer	Shiny Score	Summary	Original airdate	Winner
1	Sailing Club	Philip Hawthorn	Tigs	Round 1: 0-2; Round 2: 2-3; Round 3: 4-3	Tigs asks us questions about motorboats, rowing boats and sailing boats.	25 March 2002	Dogsby
2	Child's Garden	Philip Hawthorn	Dogsby	Round 1: 1-2; Round 2: 3-3; Round 3: 3-5	Dogsby asks us questions about a folly garden.	26 March 2002	Mukka
3	Camping	Chris Ellis	Mukka	Round 1: 1-1; Round 2: 3-2; Round 3: 4-3	Mukka asks us questions about the life of camping.	27 March 2002	Dogsby
4	Magician	Chris Ellis	Tigs	Round 1: 1-1; Round 2: 2-1; Round 3: 2-2	Tigs asks us questions about magic.	28 March 2002	Draw
5	Dancing	Philip Hawthorn	Dogsby	Round 1: 1-1; Round 2: 2-3; Round 3: 3-4	Dogsby asks us questions about different types of ballet dancing.	29 March 2002	Mukka
6	Pottery	Philip Hawthorn	Mukka	Round 1: 1-1; Round 2: 1-2; Round 3: 2-4	Mukka asks us questions about how pottery is made.	30 March 2002	Tigs
7	Babies	Chris Ellis	Tigs	Round 1: 1-1; Round 2: 2-3; Round 3: 3-5	Tigs asks us questions about babies.	31 March 2002	Mukka
8	Washing Things	Philip Hawthorn	Dogsby	Round 1: 1-1; Round 2: 2-2; Round 3: 4-4	Dogsby asks us questions about washing clothes, cars and dishes.	1 April 2002	Draw
9	Museum	Chris Ellis	Mukka	Round 1: 1-1; Round 2: 2-2; Round 3: 2-3	Mukka asks us questions about things in a museum.	2 April 2002	Tigs
10	Cave	Chris Ellis	Tigs	Round 1: 1-1; Round 2: 2-3; Round 3: 2-4	Tigs asks us questions about things in a cave.	3 April 2002	Mukka
11	Bedtime	Alan MacDonald	Dogsby	Round 1: 2-1; Round 2: 3-2; Round 3: 4-3	Dogsby asks us questions about pyjamas, hot water bottles and bedtime stories.	4 April 2002	Tigs
12	Skateboarding	Chris Ellis	Mukka	Round 1: 1-1; Round 2: 2-2; Round 3: 3-4	Mukka asks us questions about skateboarding.	5 April 2002	Tigs
13	Glass Blowing	Chris Ellis	Tigs	Round 1: 2-1; Round 2: 3-2; Round 3: 4-3	Tigs asks us questions about how glass is made.	6 April 2002	Dogsby
14	Pond	Chris Ellis	Dogsby	Round 1: 1-2; Round 2: 3-3; Round 3: 4-4	Dogsby asks us questions about pond animals and plants.	7 April 2002	Draw
15	Florist	Chris Ellis	Mukka	Round 1: 1-1; Round 2: 2-2; Round 3: 3-3	Mukka asks us questions about life in a florist's shop.	8 April 2002	Draw
16	Jewellery Maker	Philip Hawthorn	Tigs	Round 1: 1-1; Round 2: 2-2; Round 3: 3-4	Tigs asks us questions about how jewellery is made.	9 April 2002	Mukka
17	Garage Mechanic	Chris Ellis	Dogsby	Round 1: 1-1; Round 2: 2-2; Round 3: 3-4	Dogsby asks us questions about life at a garage.	10 April 2002	Mukka
18	Bird Sanctuary	Chris Ellis	Mukka	Round 1: 1-2; Round 2: 2-3; Round 3: 4-3	Mukka asks us questions about owls and hawks at a bird sanctuary.	11 April 2002	Dogsby
19	Vet	Chris Ellis	Tigs	Round 1: 2-0; Round 2: 2-2; Round 3: 4-3	Tigs asks us questions about life at a vet's surgery.	12 April 2002	Dogsby
20	Trees	Philip Hawthorn	Dogsby	Round 1: 0-1; Round 2: 2-2; Round 3: 3-4	Dogsby asks us questions about trees in a wood.	13 April 2002	Mukka
21	Chinese Food	Philip Hawthorn	Mukka	Round 1: 2-2; Round 2: 4-3; Round 3: 4-5	Mukka asks us questions about how Chinese food is made.	14 April 2002	Tigs
22	Bicycle Ride	Philip Hawthorn	Tigs	Round 1: 0-2; Round 2: 2-3; Round 3: 4-3	Tigs asks us questions about bicycle rides.	15 April 2002	Dogsby
23	The Past – Castle	Philip Hawthorn	Dogsby	Round 1: 1-1; Round 2: 3-2; Round 3: 4-4	Dogsby asks us questions about life at a castle.	16 April 2002	Draw
24	Cheese Making	Chris Ellis	Mukka	Round 1: 1-1; Round 2: 2-3; Round 3: 3-4	Mukka asks us questions about how cheese is made.	17 April 2002	Tigs
25	Personal Hygiene	Chris Ellis	Tigs	Round 1: 1-1; Round 2: 2-3; Round 3: 4-3	Tigs asks us questions about keeping ourselves clean.	18 April 2002	Dogsby
26	Sea Life	Philip Hawthorn	Dogsby	Round 1: 1-1; Round 2: 2-3; Round 3: 4-4	Dogsby asks us questions about life at an aquarium.	19 April 2002	Draw
27	Ice Rink	Philip Hawthorn	Mukka	Round 1: 2-1; Round 2: 3-3; Round 3: 3-5	Mukka asks us questions about ice skating.	20 April 2002	Tigs
28	Cake Making	Chris Ellis	Tigs	Round 1: 1-1; Round 2: 2-1; Round 3: 2-3	Tigs asks us questions about how gingerbread men, meringues and cakes are made.	21 April 2002	Mukka
29	Artist	Chris Ellis	Dogsby	Round 1: 0-2; Round 2: 2-2; Round 3: 3-3	Dogsby asks us questions about drawing, sculpting and painting.	22 April 2002	Draw
30	Shoemaker	Alison Stewart	Mukka	Round 1: 1-2; Round 2: 2-3; Round 3: 2-5	Mukka asks us questions about how shoes are made.	23 April 2002	Tigs
31	Football Match	Chris Ellis	Tigs	Round 1: 1-1; Round 2: 2-2; Round 3: 4-3	Tigs asks us questions about football.	10 July 2002	Dogsby
32	Weaver	Alan MacDonald	Dogsby	Round 1: 1-2; Round 2: 2-3; Round 3: 3-4	Dogsby asks us questions about weaving.	11 July 2002	Mukka
33	Diwali	Chris Ellis	Mukka	Round 1: 2-2; Round 2: 3-3; Round 3: 3-4	Mukka asks us questions about Diwali.	12 July 2002	Tigs
34	Gymnastics	Alison Stewart	Tigs	Round 1: 2-1; Round 2: 2-3; Round 3: 4-3	Tigs asks us questions about soft play, bubble barrels and gymnastics.	13 July 2002	Dogsby
35	Wildlife Park	Chris Ellis	Dogsby	Round 1: 1-1; Round 2: 2-2; Round 3: 2-4	Dogsby asks us questions about bats, lions and snakes.	14 July 2002	Mukka
36	Fudge Factory	Alan MacDonald	Mukka	Round 1: 2-1; Round 2: 3-2; Round 3: 5-3	Mukka asks us questions about how fudge is made.	15 July 2002	Dogsby
37	Monkey Music	Alison Stewart	Tigs	Round 1: 2-1; Round 2: 3-2; Round 3: 3-4	Tigs asks us questions about making music and singing songs.	16 July 2002	Mukka
38	Costume Maker	Chris Ellis	Dogsby	Round 1: 2-1; Round 2: 3-3; Round 3: 3-4	Dogsby asks us questions about how fancy dress costumes are made.	17 July 2002	Mukka
39	Rocking Horse Maker	Alan MacDonald	Mukka	Round 1: 1-1; Round 2: 3-2; Round 3: 4-4	Mukka asks us questions about how rocking horses are made.	18 July 2002	Draw
40	Mosaic	Alison Stewart	Tigs	Round 1: 0-1; Round 2: 2-2; Round 3: 3-4	Tigs asks us questions about how mosaics are made.	19 July 2002	Mukka
41	Traffic Awareness	Chris Ellis	Dogsby	Round 1: 1-1; Round 2: 1-2; Round 3: 1-4	Dogsby asks us questions about zebra crossings, traffic lights and lollipop people.	20 July 2002	Mukka
42	Face Painting	Chris Ellis	Mukka	Round 1: 1-1; Round 2: 2-2; Round 3: 3-4	Mukka asks us questions about face painting, presents and fancy dress.	21 July 2002	Tigs
43	Snow Play	Chris Ellis	Tigs	Round 1: 1-1; Round 2: 2-2; Round 3: 4-3	Tigs asks us questions about playing in the snow.	22 July 2002	Dogsby
44	Clockmaker	Alison Stewart	Dogsby	Round 1: 1-2; Round 2: 2-3; Round 3: 3-4	Dogsby asks us questions about how clocks are made.	23 July 2002	Mukka
45	Bridges	Chris Ellis	Mukka	Round 1: 2-1; Round 2: 2-2; Round 3: 4-2	Mukka asks us questions about bridges.	24 July 2002	Dogsby
46	Space	Alan MacDonald	Tigs	Round 1: 1-1; Round 2: 3-2; Round 3: 4-3	Tigs asks us questions about space.	25 July 2002	Dogsby
47	Staying Healthy	Chris Ellis	Dogsby	Round 1: 0-2; Round 2: 1-3; Round 3: 3-3	Dogsby asks us questions about doctors, opticians and dentists.	26 July 2002	Draw
48	Street Working	Alison Stewart	Mukka	Round 1: 1-1; Round 2: 3-3; Round 3: 4-5	Mukka asks us questions about milk people, post people and police officers.	27 July 2002	Tigs
49	Decorations	Chris Ellis	Tigs	Round 1: 2-1; Round 2: 3-1; Round 3: 4-2	Tigs asks us questions about Eid, Christmas and Hanukkah.	28 July 2002	Dogsby
50	Weather	Alan MacDonald	Dogsby	Round 1: 1-2; Round 2: 3-2; Round 3: 3-4	Dogsby asks us questions about the weather.	29 July 2002	Mukka
51	Snow Sport	Chris Ellis	Mukka	Round 1: 1-1; Round 2: 1-3; Round 3: 1-4	Mukka asks us questions about skiing, cable cars and snowboarding. Note: the last and final episode.	30 July 2002	Tigs
