= Sue Monroe =

British actress and children's book writer

- Occupations: Actress, voice actress, presenter, writer
- Known for: Presenting CBeebies (2002–2006)

Sue Monroe is a British television presenter, actress, and author who hosted CBeebies and played the role of Poppy in Playdays.

== Career ==
Monroe presented, voiced and puppeteered Poppy the Cat in Playdays from 1988 to 1997. In February 2002, she became one of the first presenters on CBeebies, with Chris Jarvis, Sidney Sloane, and Pui Fan Lee until March 2006. She voiced Tigs the Tiger in the CBeebies show The Shiny Show. In 2006, Monroe presented Wakey! Wakey! on GMTV.

Monroe now writes children's books, the series 'The Magnificent Moon Hare' and 'The Magnificent Moon Hare and the Foul Treasure' have been translated into five languages. Monroe owns a children's shop called P.J and The Hare (a nod to her books) based in Cuckfield, West Sussex. The latest book in the Moon Hare series was published in 2022.
