= The Puzzler =

The Puzzler may refer to:

- Puzzler (DC Comics), a DC Comics character
- Puzzler (Gobots), a fictional combiner made of 6 Renegade Gobots who turn into cars
- Puzzler (Numberjacks), a villain on the BBC television series Numberjacks
- Someone who composes and/or solves puzzles
- A contest on the American radio series Car Talk
