= Show Me Show Me =

UK pre-school TV show

- Created by: Chris Jarvis; Pui Fan Lee
- Presented by: Chris Jarvis; Pui Fan Lee
- Country of origin: United Kingdom
- Original language: English
- No. of series: 6 (regular); 1 (seaside)
- No. of episodes: 156 (regular; inc. 1 special); 6 (seaside)

Production
- Production location: BBC Elstree Centre
- Running time: 25 minutes
- Production company: BBC In-House Children's Production

Original release
- Network: CBeebies
- Release: 6 July 2009 – 30 October 2015

Show Me Show Me is a pre-school television series that aired on CBeebies from 6 July 2009 to 30 October 2015 and was created and presented by Chris Jarvis and Pui Fan Lee. The series teaches and shows children to read stories about their toys.

== Characters ==
The show features five toys: Mo Mo, Tom, Stuffy, Miss Mouse, and Teddington, each of which appears in their own song as well as in a storybook adventure.

- Stuffy – A felt cube with orange hair and a pocket at the back
- Mo Mo – A girl robot with a poseable head and arms
- Miss Mouse – A knitted mouse with a red dotted headband
- Tom – A boy rag doll with brown hair
- Teddington – A teddy bear with a green waistcoat and black bow-tie

== Format ==
The show takes place on the top floor of a tower and each episode begins by climbing the ten-storey tower block lift where a child's voice counts from one to ten. On reaching ten we enter Chris and Pui's play room where a magical world of fun and games is explored.

Each show centres on two items that form the title of the episode (for example "Granddads and Glasses"), each of which is introduced by a child requesting "Show me show me granddads". Chris and Pui then explore the items via videos, songs and activities, as well as a piece in which children talk about their experiences with that item.

Shows often feature one of the characters' songs, or a story read by one of the presenters about the exploits of the toys.

Most episodes contain a sequence of a shop. If Chris runs it, Pui comes as different nursery rhyme characters such as The Grand Old Duke of York, Little Bo-Peep, Incy Wincy Spider, Little Miss Muffet, Granny Humpty and Twinkle, Twinkle, Little Star. If Pui runs it, Chris enters as one of Humpty Dumpty, the Hey Diddle cow, Jack from "Jack and Jill", Pat the Baker, or Wee Willie Winkie.

In Series 1, a cartoon series called Penelope featuring a blue koala appeared in episodes and was later split off.

In Series 2 and 3, another cartoon series called Uki was featured, about an eponymous little yellow character who conveys emotions through laughter and smiles. As with Penelope, this was eventually split off onto its own series.

The format of the show is similar to that of Play School, the BBC programme from the '60s, '70s and '80s.

== Transmissions ==
=== Series ===
Series	Start date	End date	Episodes
1	6 July 2009	2 October 2009	40
2	6 September 2010	29 October 2010	25
3	6 June 2011	29 July 2011	25
4	4 March 2013	29 March 2013	20
5	28 October 2013	20 December 2013	26
6	5 October 2015	30 October 2015	20

=== Seaside ===
Series	Start date	End date	Episodes
1	30 July 2012	4 August 2012	6

=== Specials ===
Date	Entitle
17 December 2012	Winter Special

== Controversy ==
On 7 September 2016, cast member Chris Jarvis was alleged to have used profanity during a song about kites, sparking outrage among parents. In response, the CBeebies Facebook page released a statement saying "It's kite everyone, kite! We make shows for your little ones so it's always going to be kite".
