= Step Inside =

British TV show for young children

- The title card of the show
- Starring: Chris Jarvis
- Voices of: Sue Dacre; Lynn Robertson Bruce
- Music by: Jonathan Cohen
- Opening theme: "Theme - Step Inside" from CBeebies: The Official Album (Track 22)
- Country of origin: United Kingdom
- No. of episodes: 50

Production
- Running time: 9 minutes per episode (approx.)
- Production company: Tricorn Productions

Original release
- Network: CBeebies
- Release: 11 February 2002 – April 2002

For the Mel B song, see Hot (Mel B album).

Step Inside is a British children's television programme produced by Tricorn Productions for CBeebies during 2001, in advance of the channel's launch, and aired between February and April 2002. It last reran in July 2010. There have been no VHS or DVD releases of the show, but all of the episodes have surfaced online apart from "A Bun for Barney".

== Format ==
The only human character in the show is Mr Mopple (portrayed by Chris Jarvis), a groundskeeper. Whilst doing his jobs, Mr Mopple hears a noise from the house which tells him that there is a story to be narrated. The house magically appears to come to life with a superimposed puppet face appearing on the house. As he steps inside, the face on the outside wall says, "Step Inside, all those who love stories, look and listen, we've tales to tell of fun, excitement, magic, adventure, tears, fears and laughter. Surprises as well. Step Inside."

Inside the house are the non-human characters, which use a mix of animated faces and puppet hands:

- Twinkle, a talking cat
- Boris, an anthropomorphised bookcase
- Chloe, an anthropomorphic clock

Boris the bookcase provides a book and Mr Mopple sits down to narrate the story. The characters themselves often argue among themselves, along with Mr Mopple trying to keep the peace. Mr Mopple provides an array of voices for every character in the book while narrating. When Mr Mopple has finished narrating the story, he leaves the magic house (with the face on the outside wall closing its eyes and disappearing entirely) and goes back to work.

== Episodes, authors and illustrators ==
These are the episodes book titles, authors & illustrators for each episode.

1. Pass the Jam, Jim: Kaye Umansky and Margaret Chamberlain
2. When Will It Be Spring?: Catherine Walters
3. Lucky Mucky Pup: Ken Brown
4. You Can Swim, Jim: Kaye Umansky & Margaret Chamberlain
5. The Ugly Duckling: Ian Beck
6. Is That What Friends Do?: Marjorie Newman & Peter Bowman
7. Chicken, Chips and Peas: Allan Ahlberg & Andre Amstutz
8. A Duck So Small: A.H. Benjamin & Elisabeth Holstien
9. The Jelly Monster: Mike Ratnett & Jonathan Bentley
10. I Don't Want to Have a Bath: Julie Sykes & Selina Young
11. Grandmother and I: Helen E. Buckley & Jan Ormerod
12. Pig Trouble: Barbara Mossmann & Werner Farber
13. Oonga Boonga: Frieda Wishinsky and Carol Thompson
14. Farmer Duck: Martin Waddell & Helen Oxenbury
15. The Best Loved Bear: Diana Noonan & Elizabeth Fuller
16. Dad! I Can't Sleep: Michael Foreman
17. I Want a Cat: Tony Ross
18. The Scarecrow's Hat: Ken Brown
19. Stone Soup: Tony Ross
20. Look! Look!: Michael Foreman
21. Stripe: Joanne Partis
22. Flop-Ear: Guido Van Genechten
23. Bear's Eggs: Ingrid and Dieter Schubert
24. Isabel's Noisy Tummy: David McKee
25. Rum-Te-Tum Ted: Sally Grindley & Peter Utton
26. The Gruffalo: Julia Donaldson & Axel Scheffler
27. Something Special: Nicola Moon & Alex Ayliffe
28. Little Blue Car: Gwen Grant & Susan Hellard
29. A Summery Saturday Morning: Margaret Mahy & Selina Young
30. My G-r-r-r-r-reat Uncle Tiger: James Riordan & Alex Ayliffe
31. Little Mouse and the Big Red Apple: A.H. Benjamin & Gwyneth Williamson
32. Charlie's Choice: Nicola Smee
33. All By Myself: Ivan Bates
34. Scraps: Mark Foreman
35. Not Now, Bernard: David McKee
36. Blue Rabbit and Friends: Chris Wormell
37. Pete and Polo and the Washday Adventure: Adrian Reynolds
38. Tidy Up, Trevor: Rob Lewis
39. Super Dooper Jezebel: Tony Ross
40. The Lion and the Mouse: Aesop and Bernadette Watts
41. The Perfect Pet: Peta Coplans
42. The Great Goat Chase: Tony Bonning and Sally Hobson
43. Mum's Late: Elizabeth Hawkins
44. Need a Trim, Jim: Kaye Umansky & Margaret Chamberlain
45. Mrs Mopple's Washing Line: Anita Hewett and Robert Broomfield
46. Home Before Dark: Ian Beck
47. Mr Davies and the Baby: Charlotte Voake
48. Don't Do That!: Tony Ross
49. A Bun for Barney: Joyce Dunbar & Emilie Boon
50. Please, Princess Primrose!: Vivian French and Chris Fisher
