= Dandini (character) =

Character in the opera La Cenerentola by Rossini

Dandini is a character in the opera La Cenerentola by Rossini and also in the Cinderella pantomime. He is the male servant of the Prince (the principal male character: Don Ramiro in the opera, commonly Prince Charming in the pantomime). Dandini helps the Prince to meet the principal female character (known as Angelina or Cinderella) without her knowing that he is a prince. Dandini pretends to be the prince and the real prince pretends to be his servant.

In panto it is often played by a young woman, who dresses similarly to the Principal boy for the identity swap.

== Notable people who have played Dandini ==
=== Opera ===
- Sesto Bruscantini
- Luigi Lablache
- Giorgio Ronconi
- Antonio Tamburini

=== Pantomime ===
- Julian Clary
- Florrie Forde
- Stephen Gately
- Pat Kirkwood
- Gertrude Lawrence (as Alexandra Dagmar)
- Alice Lloyd
- Mary Malcolm
- Wendy Richard
- Wayne Sleep
- Louie Spence
- Nellie Wallace
- Dorothy Ward
- Sid Sloane
