= Open Mind Productions =

British television production company

- Logo used since 1993
- Industry: Television production
- Founded: June 1, 1989; 37 years ago
- Founder: Roland Tongue; Chris Ellis
- Website: openmind.co.uk

Open Mind Productions is a British television production company founded on 1 June 1989 by Roland Tongue and Chris Ellis. Tongue, who retired from the company at the end of 2011, was previously a film editor at the BBC, while Ellis was previously a teacher and script writer at Children's BBC. Their logo is a blue stylized head with a quarter piece being separated.

The company has produced programmes for children and educational TV, including The Word Machine, The Number Crew, Rat-A-Tat-Tat and Maths Mansion for Channel 4 and Numberjacks and The Shiny Show for the BBC.
