= Andy Hockley =

Welsh actor and singer

Andy Hockley is a Welsh actor and singer born in 1959 in Pontypridd, South Wales.

He has performed extensively in theatres around the UK for nearly 40 years. Internationally his work has taken him to Italy, Denmark, Switzerland, Poland, Ireland and Singapore.

On television, he is best known as Mr. Jolly of the Roundabout Stop in the BBC's iconic children's programme Playdays. He recorded two series in the mid-'90s and was the final actor to perform Mr. Jolly (Robin Fritz and Clive Duncan being his two predecessors) before the programme ended in 1997.

He has appeared in 20 pantomimes at the Belgrade Theatre in Coventry, latterly as grumbleweed the gnome.

He voiced Imp Y Celyn and Adult Tomjon in Cosgrove Hall's adaptations of Terry Pratchett's Discworld novels, Soul Music and Wyrd Sisters.

He played Monsieur Firmin in Cameron Mackintosh's 25th Anniversary tour of The Phantom of the Opera and then reprised the role at Her Majesty's Theatre in London for two years. In 2016 he played Grandpa Potts in the very successful UK/Ireland tour of Chitty Chitty Bang Bang.

Andy is the longest serving Wizard in the acclaimed musical Wicked in London's West End, having performed the role 1,119 times from July 2017 until March 2020, and again from September 2021 to January 2022 (as part of the 15th anniversary company)

From March 2017 to February 2021, he played the part of building contractor and modern slaver Philip Moss in the long-running BBC Radio 4 drama The Archers. The character is currently serving an eight-year prison sentence. In October 2022, he appeared in an episode of the BBC soap opera Doctors as Ron Osborne.

== Filmography ==
Year	Title	Role	Notes
1991	Robin Hood: Prince of Thieves	Ox	
1993	Much Ado About Nothing	George Seacole	
2022	Doctors	Ron Osborne	Episode: "All Life is Here"
