= Maths Mansion =

Educational children's television show

Maths Mansion was a British educational television series for school Years 4 to 6 (9 to eleven year olds) that ran from 19 September 2001 to 26 March 2003. Produced by Channel 4 by Open Mind, It follows the adventures of "Bad Man" taking kids to his mansion, Maths Mansion. There, the kids learn and are tested on maths every week; if they pass the quiz, they get a "Maths Card".

The kids are not allowed to leave the mansion until they get enough Maths Cards. They do not always pass the test, and this is shown in various episodes, one of them being Angleman!. Frequently interrupting each programme is another programme, about "Sad Man", who seems to be quite happy. He demonstrates maths with songs, puppets, and games.

Sad Man has a puppet called "Decimole", as for him being a mole. Decimole is known for being very greedy around food and attacking people. There were 40 episodes in four seasons. Each episode is about ten minutes long and comes with a teacher's guide and activity book and three activity sheets of differing levels for kids to use in class.

== Characters ==
The main characters of Maths Mansion (other than the several kids in each episode) are Bad Man and Sad Man. Bad Man is the game show host who traps the kids and does not let them leave until they acquire Maths Cards that are earned in his game show. One of Bad Man's catchphrases, "No Leaving Without Learning," sums up his attitude towards the kids and his role in the show.

Sad Man, a dated, uncharismatic, leather elbow patch wearing alter ego of Bad Man from the seventies, regularly interrupts Bad Man's programming with informational broadcasts that help the kids learn how to leave the mansion and teaches the lesson to the kids watching the show. Sad Man brings with him several minor characters such as Decimole and Snorter the Pig, a collection of puppets. Sad Man also occasionally has other alter egos himself such as Angleman, who is the namesake for one episode 5 of season 3.

Other than Bad Man, Sad Man, and the kids, other characters include:

- Decimole
- Miss Sniff
- Angleman
- Mr. Girhalf
- Third Bird
- Twelfth Elf
- Not So Great Big Hen
- Snorter
- Thick Stick

== Episodes ==
=== Season 1 ===
Season 1 is an introduction to the number system and general mathematics.

Episode	Episode Name	Topic
1	"Not the Great Big Hen"	Multiplying by 10 and 100
2	"Not the Great Big Hen... Again"	Dividing by 10 and 100
3	"The Deciworms"	Decimals
4	"The Negs"	Negative Numbers
5	"Fraction Aid"	Decimal Equivalents
6	"The Rounding Machine"	Rounding Decimals
7	"Get Some Fraction Action"	Dividing by Fractions
8	"The Whole Class Should be Expelled"	Percents
9	"The Queen of Tarts"	Ratios and Proportions
10	"Doing Time"	Elapsed Time

=== Season 2 ===
Season 2 is focused on doing simple mathematical calculations.

Season Episode	Episode	Episode Name	Topic
1	11	"Take it Easy"	Mental subtraction
2	12	"Nine Nits is all there's Room For"	Addition and subtraction less than 10,000
3	13	"Breaking up is Easy to Do"	Multiplication
4	14	"You Ain't Nothing but a Houndred"	Multiplication of 3-digit numbers by single digits
5	15	"Dividing we Stand"	Dividing 3-digit numbers by 2-digit numbers
6	16	"Double Digit Dating"	Multiplying double digit numbers
7	17	"Six Flat Worms"	Area
8	18	"Learn your Lines"	Parallel and Perpendicular lines
9	19	"Rectangle Delight"	Properties of rectangles
10	20	"Triangle Delight"	Properties of triangles

=== Season 3 ===
Season 3 is focused on numbers and the number system, including natural numbers, integers, and rational numbers.

Season Episode	Episode	Episode Name	Topic
1	21	"The Return of the Great Big Hen"	Mental division by multiples of 10
2	22	"Hundredths and Thousandths"	Ordering mixed sets of numbers
3	23	"Make and Break: Part 1"	Multiples and grid pattern multiplication
4	24	"Make and Break: Part 2"	Factors and prime numbers
5	25	"Do Same to the Bottom as the Top"	Equivalent fractions
6	26	"More Fraction Action"	Finding fractions
7	27	"Percentimole"	Fraction, decimal, and percentage equivalents
8	28	Proportionimole"	Ratios and proportions
9	29	"Sad Hair Day"	Column addition and subtraction
10	30	"Another Sad Hair Day"	Multiplication of decimals

=== Season 4 ===
Season 4 is focused on geometry, specifically shape, space, and problem solving using those ideas.

Season Episode	Episode	Episode Name	Topic
1	31	"All the Way Round"	Perimeter
2	32	"The Worms Return"	Area
3	33	"A Very Fine Pet is a Polyhedron"	3-D shapes
4	34	"Better get back in Shape and be a Square"	Classifying quadrilaterals
5	35	"Angleman!"	Measuring angles
6	36	"The X and Y Files"	plotting coordinates
7	37	"Makeover"	Recognising translations
8	38	"Turning Points"	Recognising rotations
9	39	"On Reflection"	Recognising reflections
10	40	"Pie Pie Everyone"	Pie charts
