= Sam Mason =

British radio and television presenter (born 1968)

Sam Mason (born 1968) is a British radio and television presenter.

Mason began her broadcasting career in the late 1980s as a continuity announcer for HTV West and presented the station's overnight strand Night Club (also broadcast on HTV Wales). She later progressed onto presenting HTV News bulletins and presenting various regional programmes including makeover show The House, local music contest First Cut, interior design series Living it Up! and topical debate programme Late & Live. She also presented and researched Custom Choppers for Men & Motors in 2007.

Mason later joined BBC Radio Bristol as a freelance presenter for two years, then went on to present a Sunday morning show and latterly, from 29 September 2008 until her dismissal in November 2008, the station's weekday afternoon show.

== BBC dismissal ==
On 8 November 2008, after coming off air from a weekday afternoon show, Mason was suspended by BBC Radio Bristol following an incident in which she made allegedly racist remarks made in an off-air phone conversation during a weekday afternoon show. Whilst phoning a taxi firm in order to send her 14-year-old daughter from Mason's Clifton home to her grandparents' home, she was said to have asked the company not to send an Asian driver. The day after her suspension, Mason was told by the BBC that she would no longer be working for the corporation. The phone call was illegally recorded by an operator for Streamline Black & White and sent to The Sun. The taxi company says the operator has since been sacked.

Mason was previously convicted in 2003 and 2004 of speeding and public order offences, whilst battling alcohol addiction.

== Personal life ==
Mason is the ex-wife of millionaire business man, Andrew Bush, from Bristol, who was murdered at his home near Marbella on the Costa del Sol by a former girlfriend in April 2014. They have a daughter, Ellie.

In May 2018 she was found guilty of assault by Scarborough magistrates court. She was given a nine-month prison sentence, which was suspended for two years because of her personal problems, the steps she had taken to beat her alcohol addiction and “the realistic prospect of rehabilitation”. She was also ordered to carry out 100 hours’ unpaid work, complete a 30-day rehabilitation programme and given a two-year restraining order.
