= Let's Play (TV series) =

British preschool television series

- Created by: Sidney Sloane; Rebecca Keatley
- Directed by: Peter Eyre other directors
- Presented by: Sidney Sloane; Rebecca Keatley
- Music by: Andy Blythe; Marten Joustra
- Country of origin: United Kingdom
- Original language: English

Production
- Production company: The Foundation

Original release
- Network: CBeebies
- Release: November 12, 2012 – August 2014

Let's Play is a British preschool television series, co-created and presented by Sidney Sloane and Rebecca Keatley. It has run since 2012 on the BBC CBeebies channel. Series 1 was filmed from April to July 2012, while series 2 was filmed from June to August 2014.

The premise of the show is that each episode involves the presenters going on an adventure and dressing up as various characters involved before bringing in comedy and play. Examples include mountain climbing and visiting musical lands. Usually one presenter will play the primary adventurer with the other acting as the other characters met. Each episode will usually have at least one short song played within.

Let's Play is also performed in a stage variation It's Time to Play which is performed by Sloane and Keatley in front of a live audience, with a similar focus on play, dress-up and adventures. The stage show moves with each performance to a different location to allow a wider range of live audiences to attend.

This is also Sid Sloane's last appearance on CBeebies.
