= Clare Bradley =

British television gardener

Clare Bradley is a former gardener for the British children's television programme Blue Peter. She also regularly took part in various Blue Peter team performances such as the Blue Peter pantomime.

She has also written books including "The Young Gardener" and "Fun with Gardening: 50 Great Projects Kids Can Plant Themselves".
