= Numberjacks =

British children's television series

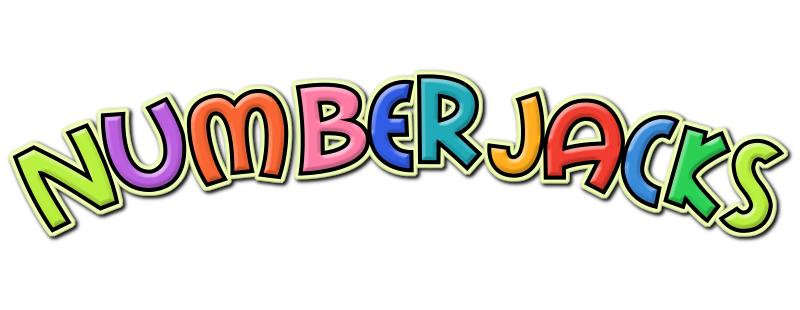
- Genre: Educational; Comedy
- Written by: Chris Ellis; Alison Stewart
- Directed by: Helen Sheppard; Imogen Robertson
- Voices of: Alice Baker; Jonathan Beech; Laura Maasland; Oliver Keogh; Roz Ellis; Harry Munday; Dylan Robertson; Robert Watson; Rachel Preece; Bob Golding; Ross Mullan
- Theme music composer: Justin Nicholls
- Opening theme: "The Numberjacks Are On Their Way"
- Ending theme: "The Numberjacks Are On Their Way" (Reprise)
- Composer: Justin Nicholls
- Country of origin: United Kingdom
- Original language: English
- No. of seasons: 2
- No. of episodes: 67 (including two specials)

Production
- Producer: Roland Tongue
- Camera setup: Jeremy Read; Jamie Shelton
- Running time: 15 minutes per episode (approx.)
- Production company: Open Mind Productions

Original release
- Network: CBeebies; BBC Two
- Release: 16 October 2006 – 11 December 2009

Numberjacks is a British animated and live-action children's television series, aimed particularly at children aged 2 to 5, which was formerly shown on CBeebies and occasionally on BBC Two in the United Kingdom. It was also shown on Tiny Pop until 2016. It was produced by Open Mind Productions for the BBC and features a mixture of computer-generated animation and live-action. 67 episodes were produced. The show teaches elementary mathematics.

== Premise ==
Numberjacks centres on the adventures of a group of anthropomorphic numbers. The main Numberjacks, Three, Four, Five, and Six, are the main protagonists of the series. The Numberjacks live inside of a household sofa. They receive a call from live-action children, who report on problems and strange anomalies that need solving. The Numberjacks set off to the problematic location to investigate. When they discover the issue, usually caused by the show's main antagonists — the Meanies, the Numberjacks empower themselves with the Brain Gain Machine to solve the problem and defeat the Meanies.

== Characters ==
The ten Numberjacks.

=== Main ===
- Three (voiced by Alice Baker)
- Four (voiced by Jonathan Beech)
- Five (voiced by Laura Maasland)
- Six (voiced by Oliver Keogh)

=== Recurring ===
- Zero (voiced by Dylan Robertson)
- One (voiced by Dylan Robertson)
- Two (voiced by Robert Watson)
- Seven (voiced by Roz Ellis)
- Eight (voiced by Harry Munday)
- Nine (voiced by Roz Ellis)

=== The Meanies ===
- Puzzler (voiced by Bob Golding) - A floating head with moveable features made of bubbles. He enjoys creating puzzles, and always speaks in rhyme. He tends to trap the Numberjacks in orange "Puzzle Balls" which only pop when a respective puzzle is completed. When he is defeated, the Puzzler pops like a bubble.
- Spooky Spoon (voiced by Rachel Preece) - An anthropomorphic flying mixing spoon who usually causes problems with matching, order, and sequences by mixing things up. She is highly self-centred and narcissistic, thinking of herself to be superior to everyone.
- Shape Japer (voiced by Rachel Preece) - A floating, shape-shifting being, who can causes objects to transform in various ways or other actions which involve shapes. She normally takes the form of a cube or a sphere, but she can also turn into a square, a circle, a cylinder, a cone, or a triangle.
- Problem Blob (vocal effects provided by Bob Golding) - An anthropomorphic green blob with an eye stalk in his mouth that spits out slime. When the Problem Blob's slime sticks to an object or person it causes strange and absurd effects, such as changing someone's behaviour or causing objects to transform.

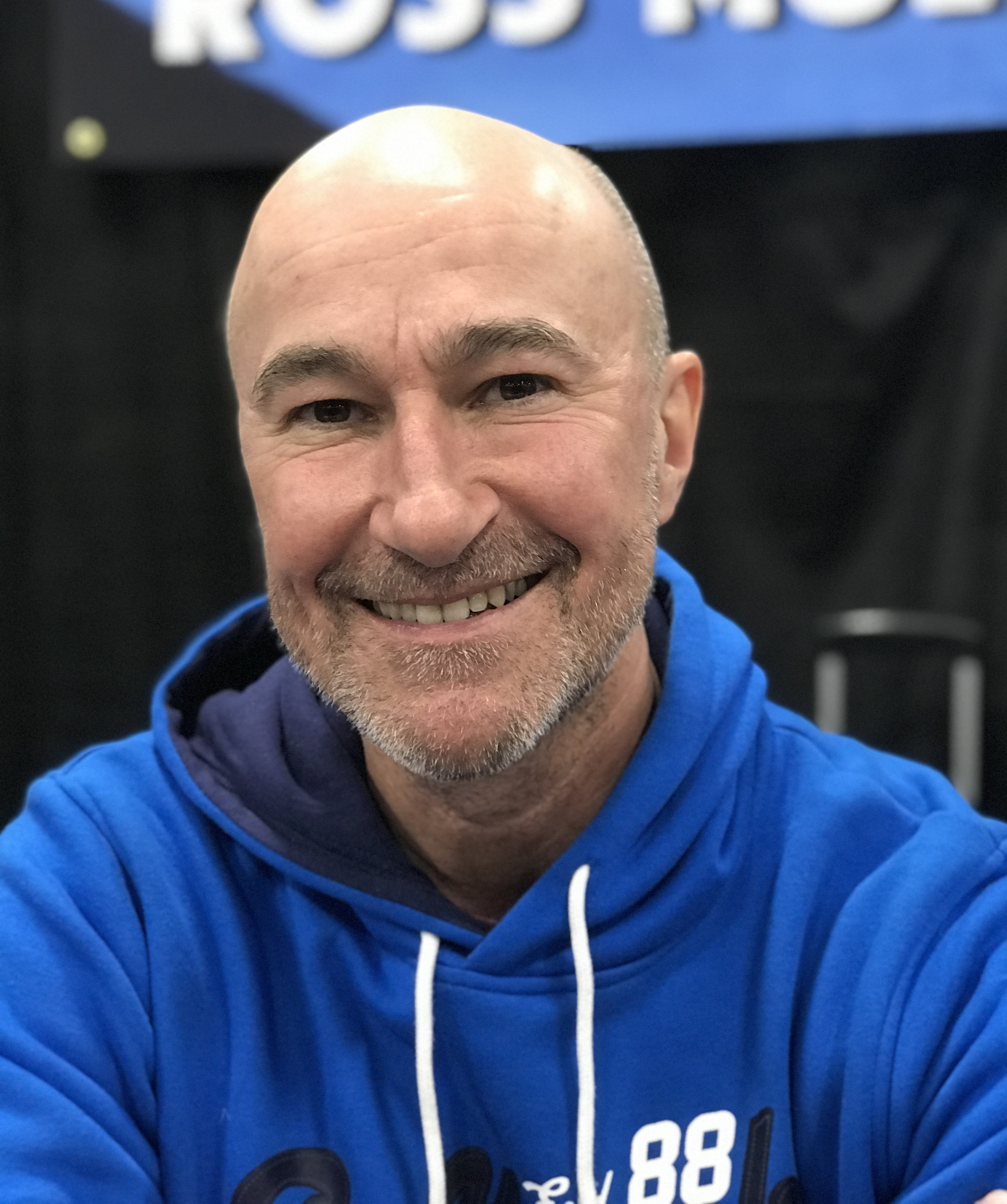
Ross Mullan plays the Numbertaker in the show

- Numbertaker (portrayed by Ross Mullan) - A tall, silent man who wears a white coat and tophat. His hand can change into a variety of devices to subtract quantities of objects, including a magnet, a grabber, a net, a hook, and his “number sucker-upper”. On some occasions, he may transition himself to the "Numbermaker", who adds instead, including additional versions of himself as clones.

== Episodes ==
Series 1, consisting of 45 15-minute episodes, first aired in autumn 2006. Series 2, consisting of 20 15-minute episodes first aired on CBeebies in 2009.

=== Series overview ===
Series	Episodes	Originally released	
Series	Episodes	First released	Last released
1	47	16 October 2006	30 March 2007
2	20	26 October 2009	11 December 2009
3	2	24 November 2008	3 August 2009

=== Series 1 (2006–2007) ===
No. overall	No. in season	Episode	Original airdate	Overview	Numberjacks	Agents	DVD Release
1	1	The Trouble With Nothing	16 October 2006	0 makes things disappear, and 6 flies out to sort him and the problems out.	Numberjacks: 0, 1, 3, 4, 5, 6	Agents: 33, 42, 16, 68	Volume 1
2	2	Going Wrong, Going Long	17 October 2006	The Problem Blob makes things go very long indeed, including a man's mop and a boy's pencil. 4 flies out and sorts him out.	Numberjacks: 3, 4, 5, 6	Agents: 16, 28, 68, 53	Volume 1
3	3	Sphere Today, Gone Tomorrow	18 October 2006	The Shape Japer turns every sphere into a cube. 6 sorts her out.	Numberjacks: 3, 4, 5, 6	Agents: 28, 33, 101, 70	Volume 2
4	4	In, Out, Shake It All About	19 October 2006	The Puzzler makes his eyes come out on both sides of him, making them turn, his green glasses and nose on top: It's making everything outside and not in. 3 and 5 sort him out, once they are both freed from the Puzzle Bubble.	Numberjacks: 3, 4, 5, 6	Agents: 70, 94, 42, 53	Volume 1
5	5	One More Time	20 October 2006	When everyone passes under a bridge, they become one higher number: 4, who flies out, turns into a 5, and then into a 6. It's cheeky Numberjack 1 who's causing all the trouble.	Numberjacks: 1, 3, 4, 5, 6	Agents: 53, 28, 94, 68	Volume 2
6	6	Forward Thinking	23 October 2006	The Problem Blob is back – and things go backwards and forwards. 6 hitches a lift to save the day.	Numberjacks: 0, 1, 2, 3, 4, 5, 6	Agents: 16, 33, 53, 85	Volume 3
7	7	Seven Wonders	24 October 2006	4 finds things add up to 7 when the Puzzler's about, and 7 is caught by him - in a poisonous "Puzzle Bubble".	Numberjacks: 1, 3, 4, 5, 6, 7	Agents: 53, 42, 70, 16	Volume 3
8	8	Getting Heavy	25 October 2006	Spooky Spoon is swapping light things and heavy things – 5 and 3 both fly out together to save the day.	Numberjacks: 3, 4, 5, 6, 9	Agents: 53, 16, 68, 85	Volume 2
9	9	Belongings	26 October 2006	Things don't belong when Spooky Spoon mixes things up – another problem for 5 to solve.	Numberjacks: 3, 4, 5, 6	Agents: 16, 33, 68, 42	Volume 3
10	10	4 He's A Jolly Good Fellow	27 October 2006	The Numbertaker is taking all the number fours that he can find – will 4 be able to escape his clutches?	Numberjacks: 3, 4, 5, 6	Agents: 28, 68, 101	Volume 1
11	11	Boxing Day	30 October 2006	Boxes go wrong when the Shape Japer plays tricks – but 6 can do the trick too.	Numberjacks: 3, 4, 5, 6	Agents: 85, 33, 101, 94	Volume 1
12	12	Out Of Order	31 October 2006	Spooky Spoon makes sure that things are well out of order – until 5 sorts her out with some "Brain Gain".	Numberjacks: 1, 2, 3, 4, 5, 6	Agents: 47, 96, 73, 88	
13	13	Nine Lives	1 November 2006	The Puzzler has trapped 9 in a poisonous puzzle bubble – 6 and 3 come to the rescue.	Numberjacks: 3, 4, 5, 6, 9	Agents: 25, 34, 88, 100	Volume 2
14	14	Take Away	2 November 2006	Not just a few problems, but many of them – 4 eventually makes the Numbertaker take more than he wants to.	Numberjacks: 3, 4, 5, 6	Agents: 28, 101 (Although mixed up with 42), 85, 70	Volume 4
15	15	The Cuck-Cuck-Cuck-Oo-Oo-Oo Bird	3 November 2006	There's a pattern to the problems that the Puzzler causes – and Numberjack 5 has to break that pattern on her own, once and for all.	Numberjacks: 3, 4, 5, 6	Agents: 14, 47, 73, 96	Volume 4
16	16	Stop And Go	19 February 2007	Things don't move when they should, like a walking rubbish bin and so on – 6 has got to sort Spooky Spoon out, otherwise there'll be more trouble.	Numberjacks: 0, 3, 4, 5, 6	Agents: 34, 52, 73, 100	
17	17	Off Colour	20 February 2007	Spooky Spoon wants to be the most colourful character around, by taking other yellow, red, and blue things – 4 is out to stop her, once and for all.	Numberjacks: 3, 4, 5, 6	Agents: 88, 34, 25, 100	Volume 1
18	18	A Game Of Two Halves	21 February 2007	The Shape Japer makes half a load of trouble, and 4 has to make things whole again.	Numberjacks: 2, 3, 4, 5, 6	Agents: 14, 47, 73, 96	Volume 3
19	19	Out For The Count	22 February 2007	2 is out and about and making everyone count incorrectly – 6 goes after him.	Numberjacks: 2, 3, 4, 5, 6	Agents: 96, 61, 100, 25	Volume 4
20	20	The Container Drainer	23 February 2007	Everything (including a bottle, a sandpit, a bowl, and a tub of ice cream) is empty thanks to the Puzzler – 3 helps 5 to fill things up again, but not without knowing she gets caught by the Puzzler.	Numberjacks: 2, 3, 4, 5, 6	Agents: 25, 61, 96, 100	Volume 5
21	21	Tens Moments	26 February 2007	1 and 0 get out and about and make ten of everything – creating more work for 5.	Numberjacks: 0, 1, 3, 4, 5, 6	Agents: 25, 52, 61, 88	
22	22	3 Things Good	27 February 2007	3 is out on her own for the very first time, trying to do battle with the Shape Japer, who does not like things in threes when she's messing with fours.	Numberjacks: 1, 2, 3, 4, 5, 6	Agents: 25, 34, 88, 100	Volume 4
23	23	Say What You Mean	28 February 2007	Be clear what you mean, otherwise the Problem Blob will make trouble for you, as 4 finds out.	Numberjacks: 3, 4, 5, 6	Agents: 34, 47, 100, 14	Volume 5
24	24	One Won	1 March 2007	There's only one of everything, thanks to the Numbertaker – 6 sorts things out, with help from 1.	Numberjacks: 1, 3, 4, 5, 6	Agents: 55, 68, 70, 94	Volume 2
25	25	Tricky Sixes	2 March 2007	The Numbertaker likes two lots of three today – 6 is the Numberjack to sort him out.	Numberjacks: 3, 4, 5, 6	Agents: 42, 85, 55, 68	
26	26	May The Fours Be With You	5 March 2007	The Shape Japer is after things that come in eighths – 4 goes on the mission.	Numberjacks: 2, (does not speak), 3, 4, 5, 6, 8	Agents: 16, 42, 68, 101	Volume 5
27	27	Best Estimate	6 March 2007	The Problem Blob makes things go wrong when people cannot estimate – It's Numberjack 5 to the rescue.	Numberjacks: 3, 4, 5, 6	Agents: 28, 55, 70, 101	Volume 2
28	28	On and Off	7 March 2007	Spooky Spoon is mixing things up again, so instead of being on things are off – 4 is on the case.	Numberjacks: 3, 4, 5, 6	Agents: 16, 33, 68, 85	
29	29	Zero the Hero	8 March 2007	It's 0 to the rescue when just for once, the other nine Numberjacks are the problem, not the answer!	Numberjacks: 0, 1, 2, 3, 4, 5, 6, 7, 8, 9	Agents: 33, 55, 85	Volume 3
30	30	Bad Circles	9 March 2007	The Shape Japer is making bad circles by enter the circular hollow and saying "circle – bad!" – 6 gets ready to sort her out.	Numberjacks: 3, 4, 5, 6	Agents: 28, 42, 70, 94	Volume 6
31	31	Famous Fives	12 March 2007	The Puzzler sets the problem – and 5 is the right Numberjack to sort it out.	Numberjacks: 1, 2, 3, 4, 5, 6	Agents: 16, 42, 68, 94	Volume 6
32	32	Fair Shares	13 March 2007	Things aren't being shared fairly, thanks to the Problem Blob – 6 makes everything all right.	Numberjacks: 1, (makes cameo at the end) 2, 3, 4, 5, 6, 7, 8	Agents: 28, 101, 85, 33	Volume 4
33	33	Being 3	14 March 2007	The Numbertaker is taking threes today – but he cannot take Numberjack 3.	Numberjacks: 1, 3, 4, 5, 6	Agents: 28, 55, 70, 101	Volume 3
34	34	Into the Teens	15 March 2007	The Numbertaker has added ten more of things – 4 has to sort him out, or else there'll be more chaos in the outside world.	Numberjacks: 1, 3, 4, 5, 6, 7, 8, 9	Agents: 33, 55, 70, 85	Volume 6
35	35	Slide and Turn	16 March 2007	The Shape Japer is moving things and causing problems – 5 goes out there to solve the problem.	Numberjacks: 1, 2, 3, 4, 5, 6	Agents: 17, 41, 60, 106	
36	36	Six Of One	19 March 2007	The Problem Blob is making trouble with sixes – It's Numberjack 6 to the rescue.	Numberjacks: 0, 1, 2, 3, 4, 5, 6	Agents: 22, 41, 60, 106	
37	37	Time Trouble	20 March 2007	Time passes very strangely – thanks to Spooky Spoon. 5 investigates, on her own.	Numberjacks: 3, 4, 5, 6	Agents: 38, 54, 79, 95	Volume 5
38	38	1, 2, 3, Go	21 March 2007	It's 1, 2, 3 – pattern time! 9 helps 3 battle against the Puzzler.	Numberjacks: 1, 2, 3, 4, 5, 6, 9	Agents: 17, 54, 60, 106	
39	39	More 4	22 March 2007	Shape Japer makes trouble with symmetry – 4 goes out there, all by himself, to sort things out.	Numberjacks: 3, 4, 5, 6, 7, 8	Agents: 17, 22, 41, 38	
40	40	Almost Human	23 March 2007	Problem Blob causes trouble – and 4 tries out being a human being, for once.	Numberjacks: 3, 4, 5, 6	Agents: 79, 83, 95, 106	
41	41	Two, Four, Six, Eight!	26 March 2007	Numbertaker takes all the even numbers – 6 and 8 fly out to put things right.	Numberjacks: 0, 1, 2, 3, 4, 5, 6, 7, 8, 9	Agents: 79, 54, 57, 17	Volume 5
42	42	Round and Round	27 March 2007	Problem Blob has gotten people going round in circles – can 5 restore things to normal before it's too late?	Numberjacks: 1, 2, 3, 4, 5, 6	Agents: 41, 60, 83, 106	
43	43	Square Dancing	28 March 2007	Shape Japer's about – and 1, 4, and 9 sort out problems with squares.	Numberjacks: 1, 3, 4, 5, 6, 9	Agents: 22, 41, 79, 95	
44	44	Data Day	29 March 2007	Spooky Spoon is mixing things up and makes things at a cafe behave like party things and vice versa – 3 gets ready to take her on.	Numberjacks: 3, 4, 5, 6	Agent: 17, 54, 60, 106	Volume 4
45	45	How? What? Check!	30 March 2007	5 sorts out the Puzzler's problems on her own – and checks to make sure.	Numberjacks: 3, 4, 5, 6	Agents: 22, 38, 83, 95	

=== Series 2 (2009) ===
No. overall	No. in season	Episode	Original airdate	Overview	Numberjacks	Agents
46	1	Ups and Downs	26 October 2009	Spooky Spoon is turning everything upside down, so 8 is sent out to help 4.	Numberjacks: 0, 1, 2, 3, 4, 5, 6, 8	Agents: 18 (Upside Down), 37, 58
47	2	On The Move	27 October 2009	The Problem Blob is making things move when they should not, so 5 is sent out to stop him.	Numberjacks: 3, 4, 5, 6	Agents: 81, 44, 63
48	3	Very Shapely	28 October 2009	The Shape Japer is causing problems again by stretching the shapes of things – 6 is after her.	Numberjacks: 1, 3, 4, 5, 6	Agents: 99, 72, 27
49	4	Wee Three Phone Home	29 October 2009	The Puzzler is causing some people to repeat his silly movements – 3 is sent out on her own to stop him.	Numberjacks: 0, 1, 2, 3, 4, 5, 6, 7, 8, 9	Agents: 108, 12, 63
50	5	Did You Notice Anything?	30 October 2009	The Numbertaker is taking away people's noticing skills, and then, he silently plays tricks on them without them noticing – 4 is sent out to defeat him.	Numberjacks: 0 (does not speak at the end), 3, 4, 5, 6	Agents: 81, 108, 27
51	6	Measured Response	2 November 2009	Things are changing length thanks to the Shape Japer, so Numberjack 6 is sent out to change them back to normal.	Numberjacks: 3, 4, 5, 6	Agents: 72, 44, 37
52	7	Think Again	3 November 2009	3 and 4 are playing in the gym when 5 discovers that Spooky Spoon is mixing things up - again.	Numberjacks: 3, 4, 5, 6	Agents: 58, 99, 63
53	8	Carry On Counting	4 November 2009	6 is sent out to do battle with the Problem Blob, who is causing people to go back to the beginning of things when they shouldn't.	Numberjacks: 0, 3, 4, 5, 6, 7, 8	Agents: 12, 108, 81
54	9	A Record In the Charts	5 November 2009	4 is sent out to defeat the Puzzler, who is stopping the cafe customers from remembering whether they have had too much food to eat or not.	Numberjacks: 3, 4, 5, 6, 7, 8, 9	Agents: 27, 72, 44
55	10	Half Time	6 November 2009	The Numbertaker is halving the numbers of everything, so Numberjack 4 is sent out to stop him.	Numberjacks: 3, 4, 5, 6, 8	Agents: 37, 58, 99
56	11	A Close Thing	9 November 2009	A girl cannot get near her favourite teddy bear, and grown-ups need help with things being too close to them. 6 flies out to sort the Problem Blob out.	Numberjacks: 2, 3, 4, 5, 6	Agents: 58, 37, 18
57	12	A Circle At Both Ends	10 November 2009	5 has to fly out on her own when a young boy has trouble with his chalks, all thanks to the Shape Japer.	Numberjacks: 3, 4, 5, 6	Agents: 44, 63, 81
58	13	Matchmaking	11 November 2009	3 flies out on her own to sort the Numbertaker, who takes then and adds anything, so that they do not match.	Numberjacks: 1, 3, 4, 5, 6	Agents: 99, 72, 27
59	14	A Different Sort	12 November 2009	4 flies out to stop Spooky Spoon sorting things out constantly in different groups.	Numberjacks: 0, 1, 3, 4, 5, 6, 8, 9	Agents: 12, 108, 63
60	15	Areas of Concern	13 November 2009	In the gym, 6 and his buddy tiles are making patterns on the floor and flying around, before he flies out to defeat the Puzzler.	Numberjacks: 3, 4, 5, 6	Agents: 18, 37, 99
61	16	The Dreaded Lurgi	7 December 2009	5 flies out to stop the Problem Blob from making people go up and down, and round and round. 6, 4 and 3 had come down with a nasty cold called the dreaded lurgi and needed to rest to recover while 5 handled the mission on her own.	Numberjacks: 0, 3, 4, 5, 6	Agents: 58, 81, 18, 12, 72, 44, 99, 37, 108, 63
62	17	Fraction Action	8 December 2009	3 flies out on her own to beat the Shape Japer from cutting things to pieces.	Numberjacks: 3, 4, 5, 6	Agents: 12, 44, 72
63	18	Interesting Times	9 December 2009	On a cold Winter's night in the sofa, Numberjack 7 tells 0 and 1 a story about 3, 4, 5, and 6 going out one after the other; to sort out morning, daytime, evening and night time things, and Spooky Spoon herself.	Numberjacks: 0, 1, 3, 4, 5, 6, 7	Agents: 37, 58, 99
64	19	More Ways Than One	10 December 2009	4 goes out to save 8, who is trapped by the Puzzler, by finding three ways to make an eight. Adding, subtraction and multiplication.	Numberjacks: 1, 2, 3, 4, 5, 6, 7, 8, 9	Agents: 27, 63, 18
65	20	Hundreds and Thousands	11 December 2009	A girl has a hundred or so beads to make a necklace but then has only ten, then just one. 6 flies out to defeat the Numbertaker.	Numberjacks: 0, 1, 2, 3, 4, 5, 6, 7, 8, 9 (does not speak)	Agents: 44, 63, 81, 108

=== Series 1 Specials (2008-2009) ===
No. overall	No. in season	Episode	Original airdate	Overview	Numberjacks	Agents	DVD Release
66	Special 1	Counting Down To Christmas	24 November 2008	Numbertaker, Shape Japer and Spooky Spoon all make Agent 20's Christmas Day go wrong. 5 and 6 fly out together and save Christmas with help from 3 and Agents 77 and 49. (Special is currently available on DVD and YouTube.)	Numberjacks: 0, 1, 2, 3, 4, 5, 6, 7, 8, 9	Agents: 20, 77, 49	Volume 5
67	Special 2	Seaside Adventure	3 August 2009	The Numberjacks have a holiday at the beach, only to face trouble with all five Meanies. They had to find five different ways to make ten to defeat them all as a final test. (Special is currently available on YouTube and DVD.) Note: This special acts and serves as the finale to the series.	Numberjacks: 0, 1, 2, 3, 4, 5, 6, 7, 8, 9	Agents: 39, 91, 20, 121, 122	Volume 6

== Awards ==
- Royal Television Society Educational Television Awards 2006

- Awarded Best Schools Programme – 0–5 Years (for the episode "Nine Lives")

- Royal Television Society Educational Television Awards 2007

- Awarded Best Schools Programme – 0–5 Years (for the episode "Zero the Hero")

== Merchandise ==
- Books based on the episodes Sphere Today, Gone Tomorrow, In, Out, Shake It All About, 4 He's A Jolly Good Fellow, and Out of Order were released in 2008, along with a sticker book based on the episode Stop and Go in 2009; three sticker scene books were also released in 2008, along with two board books entitled 3 and Me! and 4 and More!, a "pocket library" of six board books (one for each Numberjack from 1 to 6), a "magic doodle" book, a "magnet book" including ten Numberjack magnets, a "chalkboard" activity book and a "bumpy line" colouring book in 2009, a "bumper activity book" in 2010 and two hardcover annuals for 2009 & 2010 in August 2008 & 2009. A "10-Minute Tales" book based on the episode Fair Shares was also released in 2010 - which had an accompanying CD.
- Four craft kits for a Numberjack Three tambourine, a clock, a reward chart, and a mobile were released in 2008.
- Socks featuring the Numberjacks (in sizes 3-5½, 6-8½ and 9-12), along with pyjamas featuring them (for ages 1–4) were released in 2008.
- Birthday cards featuring the Numberjacks, along with birthday and Christmas wrapping paper featuring them on five differently-coloured backgrounds (the birthday cards had "Happy Birthday" and the Christmas card had them wearing Santa Claus hats) were released in 2008.
- Plush toys of Numberjacks Zero, Two, Three, Four, Five and Six were released in three sizes in 2008, but Numberjacks One, Seven, Eight, and Nine were never produced; jigsaw puzzles, a board game, a skittle set, footballs in two colours, a tricycle, and pairs of roller skates (in sizes 6-8½) were also released at around that time, along with edible cake decorations featuring the Numberjacks (which could be personalised) in two shapes.

== UK DVD releases ==
The Numberjacks Are On Their Way! (Volume 1)

- 1. "The Trouble With Nothing"
- 2. "Going Wrong Going Long"
- 4. "In, Out, Shake It All About"
- 10. "4 He's A Jolly Good Fellow"
- 11. "Boxing Day"
- 17. "Off Colour"

Calling All Agents! (Volume 2)

- 3. "Sphere Today, Gone Tomorrow"
- 5. "One More Time"
- 8. "Getting Heavy"
- 13. "Nine Lives"
- 24. "One Won"
- 27. "Best Estimate"

Standing By To Zoom! (Volume 3)

- 6. "Forward Thinking"
- 7. "Seven Wonders"
- 9. "Belongings"
- 18. "A Game Of Two Halves"
- 29. "Zero The Hero"
- 33. "Being 3"

Brain Gain! (Volume 4)

- 14. "Takeaway"
- 15. "The Cuck-Cuck-Cuck-Oo-Oo-Oo Bird"
- 19. "Out For The Count"
- 22. "3 Things Good"
- 32. "Fair Shares"
- 44. "Data Day"

Counting Down To Christmas! (Volume 5)

- 20. "The Container Drainer"
- 23. "Say What You Mean"
- 26. "May The Fours Be With You"
- 37. "Time Trouble"
- 41. "Two, Four, Six, Eight"
- 46. "Counting Down to Christmas" (25-minute film, available on DVD and online)

Seaside Adventure (Volume 6)

- 30. "Bad Circles"
- 31. "Famous Fives"
- 34. "Into The Teens"
- 47. "Seaside Adventure" (45-minute feature available on DVD and online)
