= Sidney Sloane =

British actor

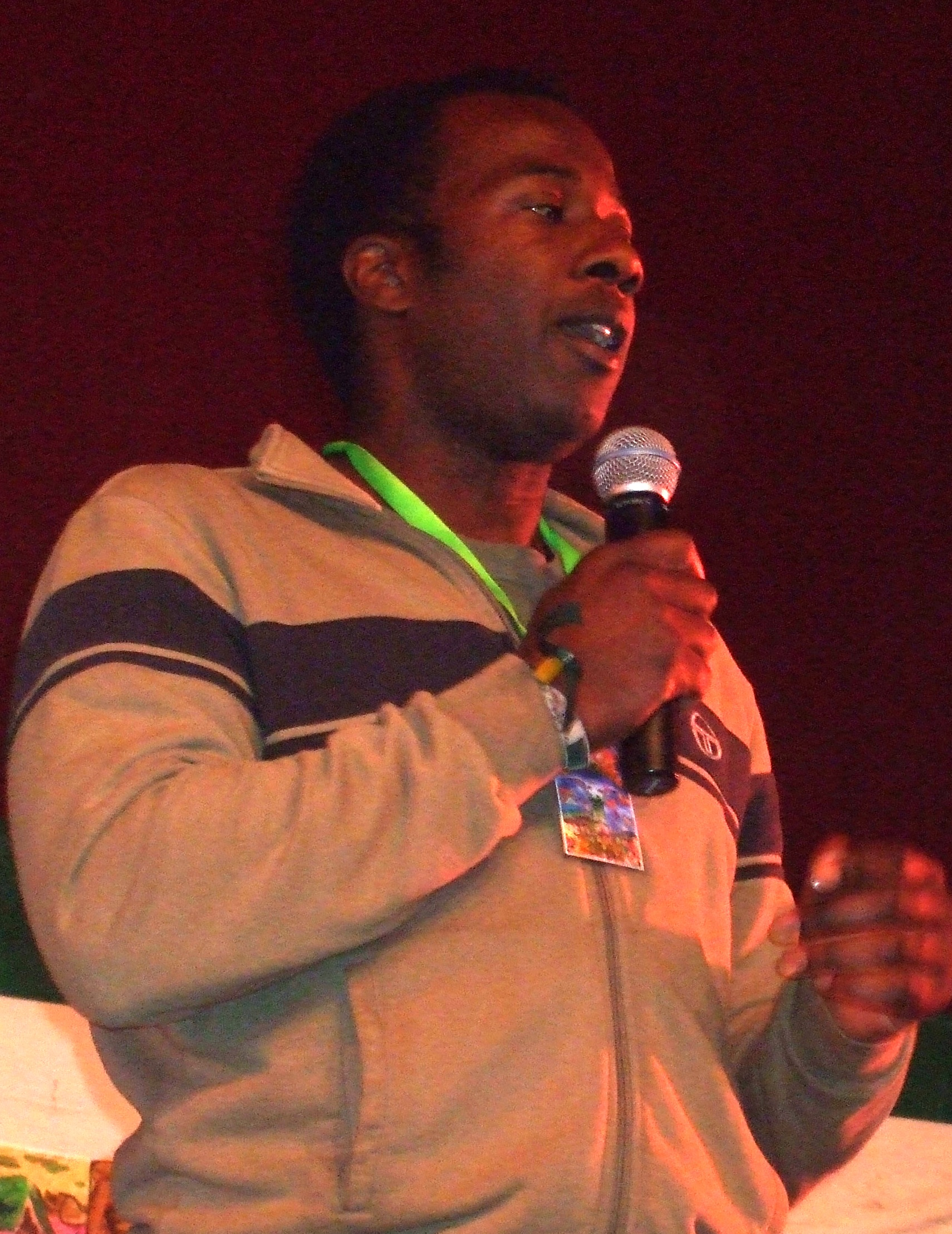
- Sloane appearing in the Kidz Field Big Top at the Glastonbury Festival in 2008
- Born: Gary Gibson; 7 June 1967 (age 59)
- Occupations: Actor, television presenter
- Known for: Presenting CBeebies (2002–2013)

Sidney Sloane (born Gary Gibson 7 June 1967) is a British actor, and television presenter. Born to Afro-Caribbean parents, he grew up in the Wandsworth and Wimbledon borders of South London. He attended Southmead Primary School and John R.C. Secondary School.

He took the stage name Sidney Sloane when he changed career from stockbroking to study acting in 1997 at the Academy of Creative Training in Brighton. A successful audition landed him a main role in the Belgrade Theatre Company's production of The Twits which took on a No.1 theatre tour of the United Kingdom.

Following an invitation to meet with some BBC executives and a screen test for the possible role as a presenter, a formal job offer was made. Sloane helped launch CBeebies in 2002. He is the channel's second longest-serving and was the only remaining original presenter when he left the presentation team on 12 April 2013.

Sloane worked as a radio presenter on BBC Southern Counties Radio as well as acting in radio dramas and taking voiceover assignments. On 14 November 2012, Sloane appeared in a new televised production entitled Let's Play, which aired on CBeebies.

The series inspires pre schoolers to discover the world through creative role play and dressing up. Let's Play is co presented by Rebecca Keatley. Sloane toured with his own live production, Sid's Show, which was performed in venues across the United Kingdom until June 2013. In Christmas 2012, Sloane appeared in pantomime as 'Jack' at the Ashcroft Theatre in Croydon for Evolution Productions.

He also appeared in the edition for Christmas of television quiz show, Celebrity Mastermind.

Sloane left his presentation role on CBeebies on 12 April 2013, but continues to have a presence on the channel as he has one of the main roles in Let's Play, which continues to be shown. Sloane played Dandini in Cinderella at the Hawth Theatre in Crawley at Christmas 2013, alongside Stephen Mulhern, with Ian Smith and Michael J. Batchelor as the ugly sisters.
