= List of Joking Apart episodes =

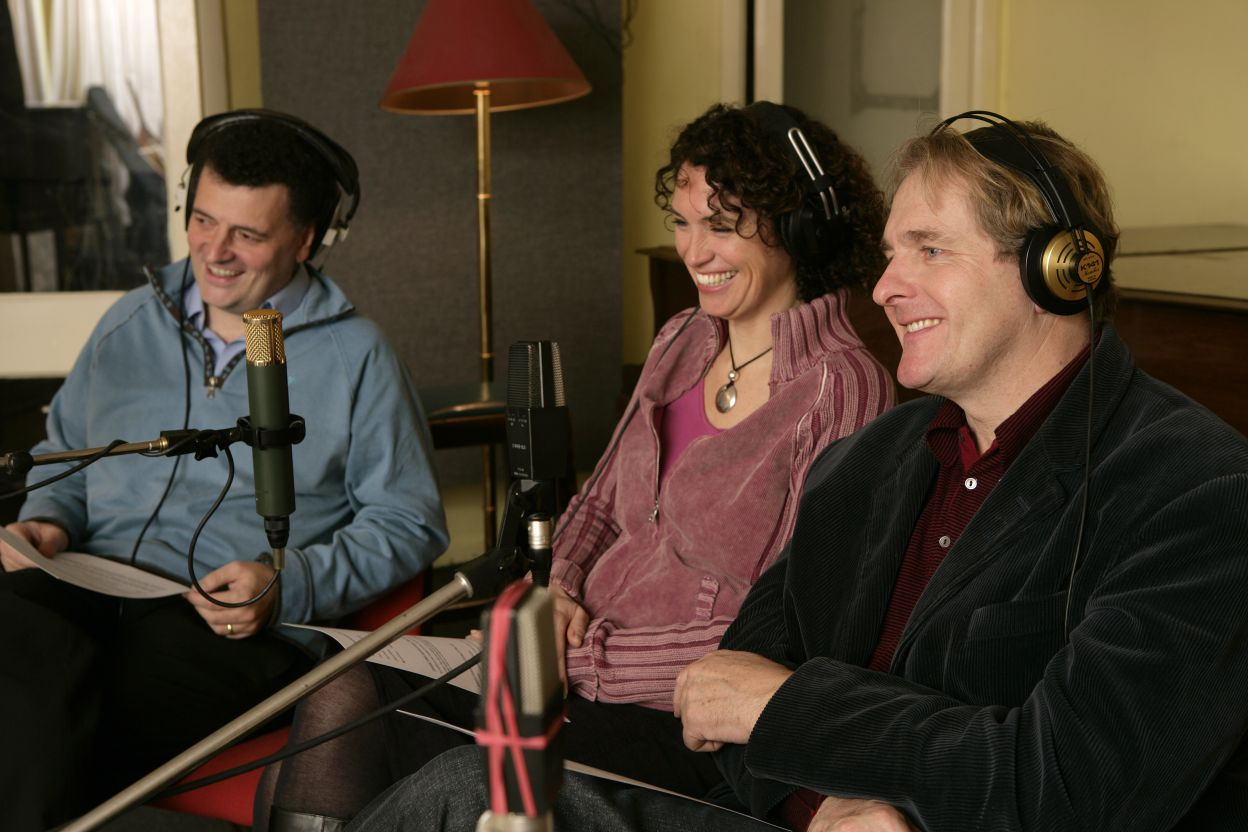
Writer Steven Moffat, and actors Fiona Gillies and Robert Bathurst recording the DVD audio commentary for the first series in January 2006

Joking Apart is a BBC Television sitcom. The show was produced by Andre Ptaszynski for the independent production company Pola Jones and screened on BBC Two. All twelve episodes from the two series were written by Steven Moffat and directed by Bob Spiers. The pilot was transmitted as part of its Comic Asides series of pilot shows on 12 July 1991. The first episode of the series was transmitted on 7 January 1993, and the final transmitted on 7 February 1995.

The show is about the rise and fall of a relationship, juxtaposing a couple, Mark (Robert Bathurst) and Becky (Fiona Gillies), who meet and fall in love before getting separated and finally divorced. The show is semi-autobiographical; it was inspired by the then-recent separation of Moffat and his first wife. Some of the first series followed a non-linear dual structure, contrasting the rise of the relationship with the separation. Other episodes were ensemble farces, predominantly including the couple's friends Robert (Paul Raffield) and Tracy (Tracie Bennett). Paul Mark Elliott also appeared as Trevor, Becky's lover.

Scheduling problems led to low viewing figures. However, it scored highly on the Appreciation Index and accrued a loyal fanbase. One fan acquired the home video rights from the BBC and released both series on his own DVD label.

== Series overview ==
Series	Episodes	Originally released	
Series	Episodes	First released	Last released
Pilot		12 July 1991	
1	6	7 January 1993	11 February 1993
2	6	3 January 1995	7 February 1995

== Episodes ==
=== Pilot (1991) ===
The pilot, directed by John Kilby, was filmed at Pebble Mill in Birmingham on 9–10 August 1990. It was transmitted on BBC2 as part of its Comic Asides series of pilot shows on 12 July 1991. It is included on the bonus disc on the second series DVD release.

The stand-up sequences were shot against a black background. Although this made it clearer that they were not "real", Moffat thought that it looked odd, and "hell to look at". The same script used for the pilot, with minor changes, was reshot by Bob Spiers for the first episode of the series proper. Some footage, such as Mark and Becky's first meeting at the funeral, leading to episode one's shared director credit between Spiers and Kilby.

=== Series 1 (1993) ===
The first series has been broadcast twice on BBC Two, first in early 1993. It was repeated in early spring 1994 to lead directly into the transmission of the second series, which was scheduled to be broadcast from June 1994.

No.	Title	Directed by	Written by	Original release date
1	"Episode 1"	Bob Spiers and John Kilby	Steven Moffat	7 January 1993
Sitcom writer Mark Taylor accidentally attends a funeral, where he meets Becky. The narrative jumps forward to their married life, in which they have a healthy sexual relationship. However, Becky becomes annoyed at his constant jokes, his sarcasm towards her friends, and how he fails to recognise that their relationship is deteriorating. He has noticed that some of her belongings are no longer in the flat. As she arrives home one evening, unaware that her friends are hiding there for a surprise birthday party, Becky tells Mark that she wants a divorce. He gets her to admit that she is being unfaithful to him, before the party guests, who have overheard everything, leave.
2	"Episode 2"	Bob Spiers	Steven Moffat	14 January 1993
Robert and Tracy return to check on Mark following his wife's departure. The three recall the circumstances in which they had first met. A flashback shows Becky and Mark's first date. Mark manages to get attached by his wrist to one half of a set of handcuffs before they go out, and has to eat one-handed through the meal. They return to Becky's flat and while Becky is getting ready to join him in bed, Mark strips down to his boxer shorts and decides to disguise his earlier carelessness by handcuffing himself to the bedframe. Robert and Tracy call on Becky unexpectedly, and Becky claims Mark is mending her bedroom radiator; but Mark is unable to free himself before they enter the bedroom to help. Moffat used a similar scenario for the Coupling episode "The Freckle, the Key, and the Couple who Weren't" and reveals in its audio commentary that it is based on a situation with one of his ex-girlfriends.
3	"Episode 3"	Bob Spiers	Steven Moffat	21 January 1993
Mark arrives at Robert and Tracy's house for dinner on the wrong night. The couple are instead expecting Becky and her new boyfriend Trevor. They spend the evening trying to keep Mark and Trevor apart, each initially not knowing that the other is also there. At one stage, hopeful of reconciliation, Mark assumes that his friends are trying to smooth things over between Becky and himself.
4	"Episode 4"	Bob Spiers	Steven Moffat	28 January 1993
One of Mark's friends advises him to sleep with a blonde to console himself after (brunette) Becky had rejected his marriage proposals. He does so, but as she is leaving the next morning his date discusses their night together while he is leaving a message on Becky's answering machine. Becky then turns up to talk about their relationship. Desperate to prevent Becky from hearing the message, he goes to her flat to change the tape, but finds Tracy staying there and has to tell her what has happened; she tries to help him, leading to further difficulties.
5	"Episode 5"	Bob Spiers	Steven Moffat	4 February 1993
After Mark attempts to return Robert's "portable telephone", he sleeps with Tracy at her home. Before he can leave, Becky and Robert arrive at the house; Mark hides in the bedroom and the en suite bathroom. Trevor also eventually arrives. After they end up speaking to each other on the phone from adjacent rooms, Robert eventually realises what has happened and threatens to shoot Mark. The episode concludes with Robert and Tracy's, and Becky and Trevor's relationships in jeopardy. This episode makes extensive use of what Moffat labels "techno-farce", which uses technology, predominantly telephones, to facilitate the farcical situations. Moffat considers this episode the best of the show. Discussing the series as a whole, he feels that the story ends after this episode.
6	"Episode 6"	Bob Spiers	Steven Moffat	11 February 1993
Mark takes a drunken woman back to his flat. Then Tracy arrives, claiming to be in love with Mark. Becky arrives and claims to want a serious talk. Mark manages to keep all three women apart, but Trevor and Robert then also turn up together and demanding answers. The series ends with Becky and Trevor, and Robert and Tracy reconciling their relationships, and Mark being left alone.

=== Series 2 (1995) ===
The format was changed for this series, with the dual timelines and much of the flashbacks dropped for a more linear narrative. Moffat felt that the relationship had already been sufficiently established in the first series so there was little point going back to the start.

Robert and Tracy are given more stories than in the first series. Their main story arc begins in the third episode when Robert is caught by all of the main characters and his parents in a maid's outfit being spanked by a prostitute. The couple temporarily separate while Robert experiments with cross-dressing, but they are reunited by the end of the series.

No.	Title	Directed by	Written by	Original release date
7	"Episode 1"	Bob Spiers	Steven Moffat	3 January 1995
Set six months after the end of series one, Mark meets Becky in a newsagents, where he is purchasing pornographic magazines. He discovers the location of Becky and Trevor's house and breaks in using Tracy's keys. However, he is forced to hide under the bed when Becky and Trevor return home. Listening to them having sex, he becomes optimistic when he thinks that Becky begins to shout his name ("M..."). The name turns out to be "Michael" (Tony Gardner), Becky's solicitor, with whom she is now being unfaithful to Trevor.
8	"Episode 2"	Bob Spiers	Steven Moffat	10 January 1995
Concerned that Becky is now cheating on him, Trevor visits Mark. Mark's psychiatrist, Robert and Tracy become convinced that Mark has enacted his fantasies of killing Trevor.
9	"Episode 3"	Bob Spiers	Steven Moffat	17 January 1995
Becky and Mark meet in a pub to discuss their separation. They encounter Robert, who Mark sees buying condoms from the toilets. As their friend seems to be acting strangely, Becky and Mark follow him, discovering that he has been visiting a prostitute.
10	"Episode 4"	Bob Spiers	Steven Moffat	24 January 1995
After locking himself out of his flat and trapping his bath towel in his door, Mark is forced to hide naked in his new neighbour's flat. In preparation for his aunt's (Barbara Keogh) arrival from Australia, Mark convinces Becky to pretend that they had not separated. Concussed after being punched by his neighbour's brother, Mark awakes when he is confronted by a man in a red polo neck jumper who claims to be "his very best friend".
11	"Episode 5"	Bob Spiers	Steven Moffat	31 January 1995
Following directly from the previous episode, it transpires that the man, who identifies himself as Dick, is the personification of Mark's penis. Worried about Mark after being hit, Becky had stayed at his flat. Dick attempts to convince Mark to take advantage of her presence, despite the various notes she has left around the flat declaring her wishes that she wants a platonic relationship.
12	"Episode 6"	Bob Spiers	Steven Moffat	7 February 1995
The final episode begins after Becky and Michael had slept together while Becky is house sitting for Tracy and Robert, and Michael hides in the bathroom when the latter couple return. Tracy phones a morning television phone-in show, and when she realises that the show's divorce expert is hiding in her bathroom she takes on his role (with a heavy Northern accent) to give herself advice on the other line.
