= List of Chalk episodes =

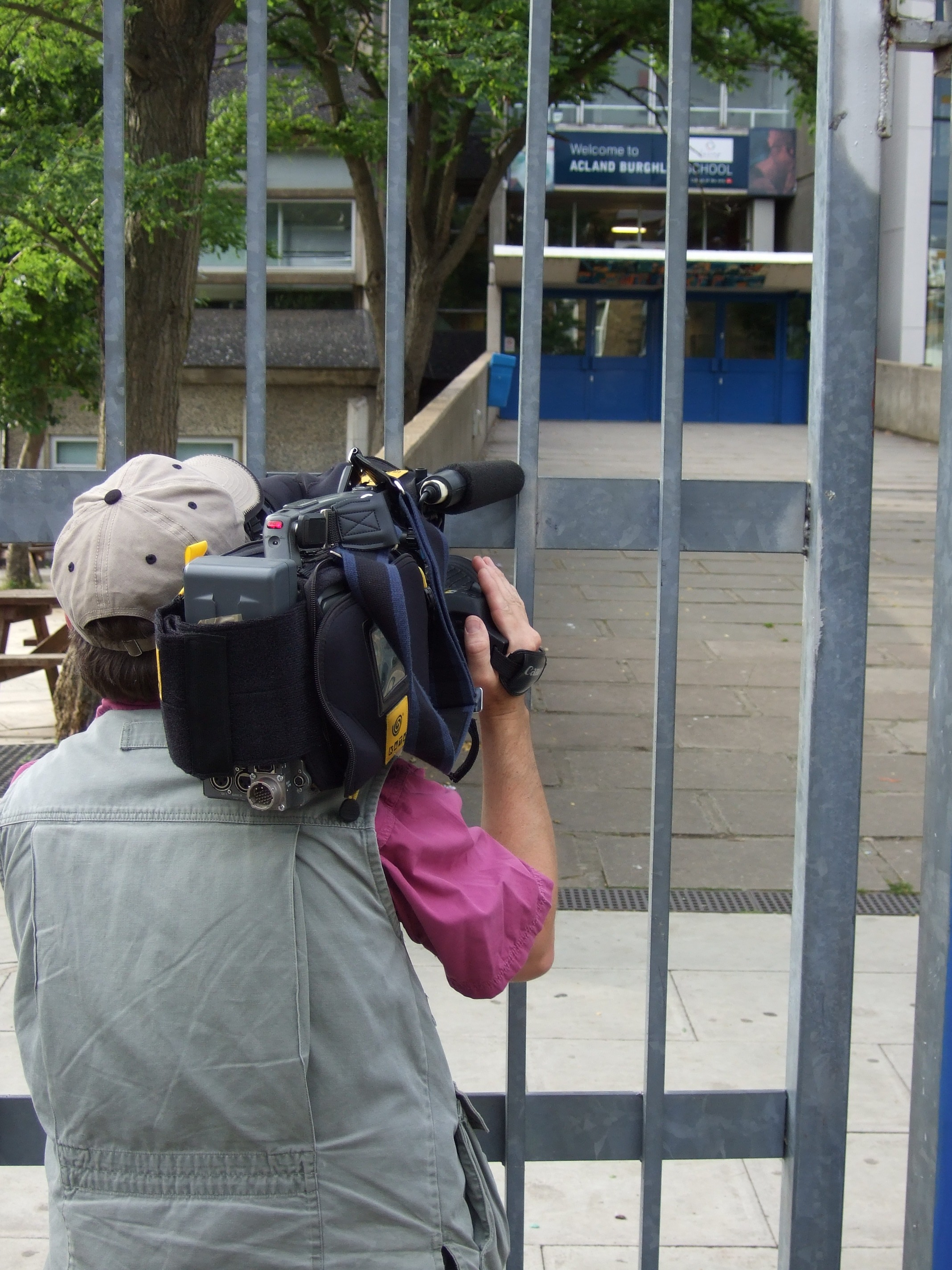
Filming outside of Acland Burghley School, Tufnell Park, London. This part of the school is seen on the show's opening titles.

Chalk is a BBC Television sitcom. The show was produced by Andre Ptaszynski for the independent production company Pola Jones and screened on BBC2. All twelve episodes from the two series were written by Steven Moffat and directed by Juliet May. The first episode of the series was transmitted on 20 February 1997, and the final transmitted on 22 October 1997.

The series focuses upon deputy headteacher Eric Slatt (David Bamber), permanently stressed over the chaos he creates both by himself and some of his eccentric staff. His wife Janet (Geraldine Fitzgerald) and new English teacher Suzy Travis (Nicola Walker) attempt to help him solve the problems.

Due to the positive reaction of the studio audience during recordings, a second series was commissioned before the first had aired. However, the first series attracted criticism, inflamed by the BBC's decision to compare the show to the highly respected Fawlty Towers in its publicity materials. The first series was released on DVD in December 2008.

== Series overview ==
Series	Episodes	Originally released	
Series	Episodes	First released	Last released
1	6	20 February 1997	27 March 1997
2	6	17 September 1997	22 October 1997

== Episodes ==
=== Series 1 (1997) ===
The first series was broadcast on BBC1 on Thursday evenings between 20 February and 27 March 1997. The first four episodes were transmitted at 21:30, but the final two episodes of the second series were moved to 22:20.

No. overall	No. in series	Title	Directed by	Written by	Original release date
1	1	"Suzy Arrives"	Juliet May	Steven Moffat	20 February 1997
New teacher Suzy Travis (Nicola Walker) joins the staff of Galfast High, only to find that the rest of her colleagues appear to be insane. She discovers that the headteacher (John Wells) has locked himself in a cupboard, and that the previous English teacher has died whilst teaching a class. Slatt (David Bamber) attempts to remove the corpse without upsetting any of the pupils.
2	2	"The Interviews"	Juliet May	Steven Moffat	27 February 1997
As the headteacher and Eric are competing for a headteacher's position at another school, the panel decide to interview them both at Galfast High.
3	3	"The Staff Meeting"	Juliet May	Steven Moffat	6 March 1997
The staff are locked in the staff room by a pupil, Gail Bennett. She is protesting over having been treated unfairly and also human rights issues in Estransia (a country invented by Mr McGill, who holds several positions at the school). As the protest continues, a TV crew arrive outside. Eric desperately needs to urinate, and does so out of a window - filmed by the TV crew who broadcast it live on TV.
4	4	"Both Called Eric"	Juliet May	Steven Moffat	13 March 1997
Star pupil Helen gives birth to twins and, as a result of her infatuation with the deputy head, decides to name them both "Eric". Meanwhile, Suzy becomes immediately attracted to the new RE teacher, Mr Cockfoster (Damien Matthews).
5	5	"The Inspection"	Juliet May	Steven Moffat	20 March 1997
Three inspectors (Deborah Norton, Steven Beard and James Saxon) are about to visit the school as the Department of Education is looking to close a school in the area. Eric is determined to create the best possible impression but he is reckoned without Music teacher Amanda Trippley (Amanda Boxer), who has expelled all of the pupils. Slatt and colleagues attempt to disguise the fact that the school has no pupils.
6	6	"Mother"	Juliet May	Steven Moffat	27 March 1997
Suzy finds a vase with a dedication to Eric's apparently dead mother. Assuming it is an urn, Suzy is surprised when his mother turns up at the school, and is the spitting image of his wife.

=== Series 2 (1997) ===
Due to the positive reaction of the studio audience during recordings, a second series was commissioned before the first had started to be transmitted. The second series was broadcast on BBC1 on Wednesday evenings between 17 September and 22 October 1997, mostly at 10:15pm.

As John Wells was too ill to film the second series, Duncan Preston played Galfast High's new headmaster, Mr Kennedy, who appeared almost identical in character to Wells' Mr Nixon.

No. overall	No. in series	Title	Directed by	Written by	Original release date
7	1	"New Student"	Juliet May	Steven Moffat	17 September 1997
Student teacher Ronald Langham (Richard Lumsden) is assigned to Galfast High for a week and develops an unusual relationship with the deputy head. As a senior education official, Ronald's mother (Richenda Carey) arrives to check on her son's progress at the school. Dan is jealous that Suzy has been dating other members of staff.
8	2	"Amanda"	Juliet May	Steven Moffat	24 September 1997
After years of failing to dismiss Amanda Trippley, Slatt believes her time may be up when an inspector from the Local Education Authority, Archie Munt (Trevor Cooper), visits the school to investigate financial irregularities and reveals her hobby.
9	3	"Bungee"	Juliet May	Steven Moffat	1 October 1997
After Slatt humiliates sixth former Maureen Bullivant (Hayley Keogh-Green) at the school assembly for her poor exam performance, her brother Malcolm (Marc Bannerman) arrives at the school for revenge. Mrs Slatt has problems too, as medical photographs of her that were used in lectures fall into Eric's hands. Meanwhile, it transpires that Dan has been spreading rumours about RE teacher Jason Cockfoster.
10	4	"Dream"	Juliet May	Steven Moffat	8 October 1997
Suzy's revelation that she has dreamed about a sexual encounter with Slatt leads to the two desperately trying to dispel accusations of any attraction between them. Meanwhile, Galfast High recruits a new pupil, Bartholomew (Toby Ross-Bryant), who is recovering from schizophrenia.
11	5	"Exam"	Juliet May	Steven Moffat	15 October 1997
It is the morning of an A level examination and nothing can go wrong for star pupil Edward (Kristopher Milnes). Seeing his pet rabbit and receiving a message from his pop idol, Jason Woods, will fully prepare him for the exam. Dr Eleanor Gillespie (Doreen Mantle) arrives at the school to invigilate the examination.
12	6	"Party"	Juliet May	Steven Moffat	22 October 1997
The staff hold an end-of-term party. Suzy and Dan uncover a videotape of a recording Slatt has made of himself talking into a camcorder.
