= Paul Raffield =

British academic, director and actor (born 1957)

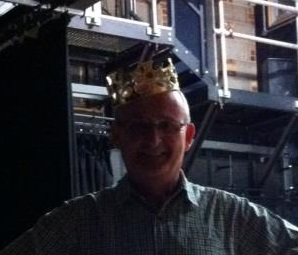
- Born: 19 June 1957 (age 68); London

Paul Raffield (born 19 June 1957, London) is a British academic, director and actor.

He had a successful career in the theatre before embarking on an academic career at the University of Warwick in 2004. In addition to his many leading roles in the theatre, he played two different characters in Coronation Street: in 1996 as Dr Stirling, and in 2005 as a vicar. Other TV credits include After You've Gone, The Worst Week of My Life, The Robinsons, The Bill, Karaoke and 2point4 Children. Films include Vera Drake, Stoned and Buddy's Song.

He appeared in two series of Steven Moffat's sitcom Joking Apart as Robert Glazebrook, opposite Tracie Bennett as his wife, supporting Robert Bathurst and Fiona Gillies. Raffield took part in the audio commentary for the DVD release of the second series in 2008.

Shortly after filming the pilot for Joking Apart, he briefly appeared in Press Gang, in the fourth-season episode "Bad News", also written by Steven Moffat and directed by Bob Spiers.

In 2001, he completed a PhD in Law at Birkbeck College, University of London. In 2004, Paul joined the University of Warwick as a member of the School of Law, where he taught Tort Law, Shakespeare and the Law, and Origins of English Law. He was awarded a Personal Chair at Warwick in 2011. In October 2023, he became Professor Emeritus. In 2024, Birkbeck College conferred on him the title of Honorary Research Fellow in Birkbeck Law School. Paul became a Fellow of the Higher Education Academy in 2009 and was awarded a National Teaching Fellowship in the same year. He is the author of Images and Cultures of Law in Early Modern England: Justice and Political Power, 1558-1660 (Cambridge University Press, 2004). He co-edited Shakespeare and the Law (Hart Publishing, 2008), a collection of papers from the international conference on Shakespeare and the Law, hosted by The University of Warwick in 2007. He is co-founder and consultant editor of the journal, Law and Humanities. His first sole-authored monograph on Shakespeare and the Law, entitled Shakespeare's Imaginary Constitution: Late-Elizabethan Politics and the Theatre of Law, was published in 2010 by Hart Publishing; it was nominated for the 2011 Inner Temple Book Prize, awarded every 3 years for a book which has made a profound contribution to the understanding of law in the United Kingdom. Paul's second book on Shakespeare and the Law, The Art of Law in Shakespeare, was published by Hart Publishing (an imprint of Bloomsbury Publishing) in 2017; it was nominated for the 2018 Hart Socio-Legal Book Prize. His latest book (the final book in his trilogy on Shakespeare and the Law), Shakespeare's Strangers and English Law, was published by Hart Publishing in 2023.

Paul played Dickie Sainsbury in the West End revival of Michael Frayn's Donkeys' Years. He directed Tim Firth's "Neville's Island" (having played Angus in the West End production), John Godber's "On the Piste" and Terry Johnson's award-winning comedy, Hysteria, at Birmingham Repertory Theatre. He played Alan Hodges in Christmas at the Riviera, ITV1.
