= Tygo Road =

British television series

- Genre: Sitcom
- Written by: Richard Cottan; Christopher Douglas
- Directed by: Bob Spiers
- Starring: Kevin McNally; Isobel Black; Steven O'Donnell; Vas Blackwood; Gordon Gostelow; Bill Bailey; Leila Bertrand; Alisa Bosschaert
- Composers: Kenny Craddock; Colin Gibson
- Country of origin: United Kingdom
- Original language: English
- No. of series: 1
- No. of episodes: 7

Production
- Executive producer: Andrew Fell
- Producer: André Ptaszynski
- Running time: 29 minutes
- Production companies: Pola Jones Productions; BBC Television

Original release
- Network: BBC2
- Release: 19 May 1989 – 12 June 1990

Tygo Road is a BBC television sitcom written by Richard Cottan and Christopher Douglas. Seven episodes were broadcast, a pilot on 19 May 1989 and a six-episode series between 8 May and 12 June 1990.

== Plot ==
The series stars Kevin McNally as Adam Hartley, an earnest would-be yuppie twit who runs badly in a Tygo Road Community centre.

== Production ==
In 1989 a one-off pilot episode was made for the anthology series Comic Asides, the BBC commissioned a full series which was broadcast one year later in 1990. In total of seven episodes were made each one was shown on BBC2, directed by Bob Spiers and produced by André Ptaszynski.

== Cast ==
- Kevin McNally as Adam Hartley
- Isobel Black as Kate
- Deborah Norton as Clare
- Steven O'Donnell as Leo
- Vas Blackwood as Gary
- Gordon Gostelow as Lionel
- Bill Bailey as Spinnij
- Leila Bertrand as Val
- Alisa Bosschaert as Selina

== Episode list ==
No. overall	No. in series	Title	Directed by	Written by	Original release date
1	—	"Pilot"	Bob Spiers	Richard Cottan and Christopher Douglas	19 May 1989
2	1	"Episode 1"	Bob Spiers	Richard Cottan, Christopher Douglas and Watt Tyler	8 May 1990
3	2	"Episode 2"	Bob Spiers	Richard Cottan and Christopher Douglas	15 May 1990
4	3	"Episode 3"	Bob Spiers	Richard Cottan and Christopher Douglas	22 May 1990
5	4	"Episode 4"	Bob Spiers	Richard Cottan and Christopher Douglas	29 May 1990
6	5	"Episode 5"	Bob Spiers	Richard Cottan and Christopher Douglas	5 June 1990
7	6	"Episode 6"	Bob Spiers	Richard Cottan and Christopher Douglas	12 June 1990

== Production ==
It was set in the Tygo Road Community Centre, the last bridgehead against the remorseless march of Thatcherism.
