= Chalk (TV series) =

British sitcom television series

- Opening title. A crane shot descends outside of Galfast High.
- Written by: Steven Moffat
- Directed by: Juliet May
- Starring: David Bamber; Nicola Walker
- Theme music composer: Howard Goodall
- Country of origin: United Kingdom
- Original language: English
- No. of series: 2
- No. of episodes: 12 (list of episodes)

Production
- Executive producer: Kevin Lygo
- Producer: Andre Ptaszynski
- Editor: Richard Halladay
- Running time: 30 minutes

Original release
- Network: BBC One
- Release: 20 February – 22 October 1997

Chalk is a British television sitcom set in a comprehensive school named Galfast High. Two series, both written by Steven Moffat, were broadcast on BBC1 in 1997. Like Moffat's earlier sitcom Joking Apart, Chalk was produced by Andre Ptaszynski for Pola Jones.

The series focuses upon deputy headteacher Eric Slatt (David Bamber), permanently stressed over the chaos he creates both by himself and some of his eccentric staff. His wife Janet (Geraldine Fitzgerald) and new English teacher Suzy Travis (Nicola Walker) attempt to help him solve the problems.

Because of the very good reaction of the studio audience, a second series was commissioned before the first had been broadcast. However, journalists were critical of the show, highlighting stylistic similarities to Fawlty Towers. Some members of the teaching profession and its unions objected to the negative representation of teachers and the comprehensive system. The second series did not receive a stable broadcast slot, with many episodes aired after 10pm. The first series was released on DVD in December 2008.

== Production ==
=== Inception ===
Steven Moffat left his job as an English teacher at Cowdenknowes High in Greenock to write the BAFTA Award-winning show Press Gang. However, its high cost and changes in the executive structure at Central Independent Television meant that the show might not be recommissioned after its second series. As the writer wondered what to do next and was worried about future employment, Bob Spiers, Press Gang's primary director, suggested that he meet with producer Andre Ptaszynski to discuss writing a sitcom. Inspired by his experience in education (in addition to his own former career, his father was a headteacher), the writer's initial proposal was similar to what would become Chalk. However, Ptaszynski realised that Moffat was talking more passionately at the meeting at the Groucho Club about his impending divorce and suggested that he write about that instead. That idea became Joking Apart, which received low audience figures but a high rating on the Appreciation Index. In an interview with The Herald, Moffat reflected on the nature of writing from experience: "I don't think you have an alternative to writing about what you know. You've no life experience to go on other than your own. Even if you're writing something you think is entirely remote from you—Star Trek, for instance—you'll find the finished result is actually very close to your own experience. That's not a conscious decision a writer makes—it's an inevitability."

After the second series of Joking Apart had been transmitted, Ptaszynski revived Moffat's original idea about a sitcom set in a school. In an article for The Guardian newspaper, writer and comedian Richard Herring observed that Moffat has not used the show "as a soapbox from which to satirise the government's educational policy, preferring to concentrate on being funny ... yet beneath it all is a much more broadly satirical swipe at the implicit pointlessness of the way we are educated." For this article, Moffat told Herring:

Secondary School is a big waste of time. What are French teachers doing? None of us can speak French. How much maths can you do? Do you know any history? What is the point in training people to do things that none of us can do? The system seems designed to qualify you for the Indian Civil Service in 1911. We all leave school unable to drive! Now that would be quite handy.

Moffat discussed similar institutional and political issues with The Independent:

Staffrooms are funny places, full of articulate, mad people. They have a tremendous sense of black humour, but there's a layer of dust over them. They are immature because they're in a children's environment all the time. They have a strange perspective; because they spend all day with kids, they are more aware of kids' culture than adults'. When they read about a former pupil who has become head of ICI, they always say, 'But that boy's an idiot. He's crap at geography.' The boy is condemned forever because in the 1960s he didn't know all the capitals of the Third World.

The Independent reported that Moffat "stresses that Chalk is a sitcom, not some banner-waving, agitprop pamphlet", but is still "passionate about education". Moffat criticises "the [Conservative] government talk about the specially talented needing more education, but that's absurd, the equivalent of hospitals for the healthy." Moffat expected that teachers would find the show funny because it "has certain notes of accuracy", recognising familiar myths such as the dead teacher and teachers' contempt for their pupils. Moffat continued to say that teachers would "also recognise the pathological preference for science over arts and all that league-table shit. An official teaching organisation couldn't say, 'It's a very faithful portrayal,' but I hope they'd say, 'It's a comedy series. Why take it seriously?' You couldn't claim it is the most flattering series, but, there again, people continued to stay at hotels after Fawlty Towers."

As with Joking Apart, Ptaszynski produced Chalk for independent production company Pola Jones. The positive reaction of the studio audience during recording of the first series in 1996 propelled executives to commission a second set of six episodes before the first batch had aired.

=== Recording ===
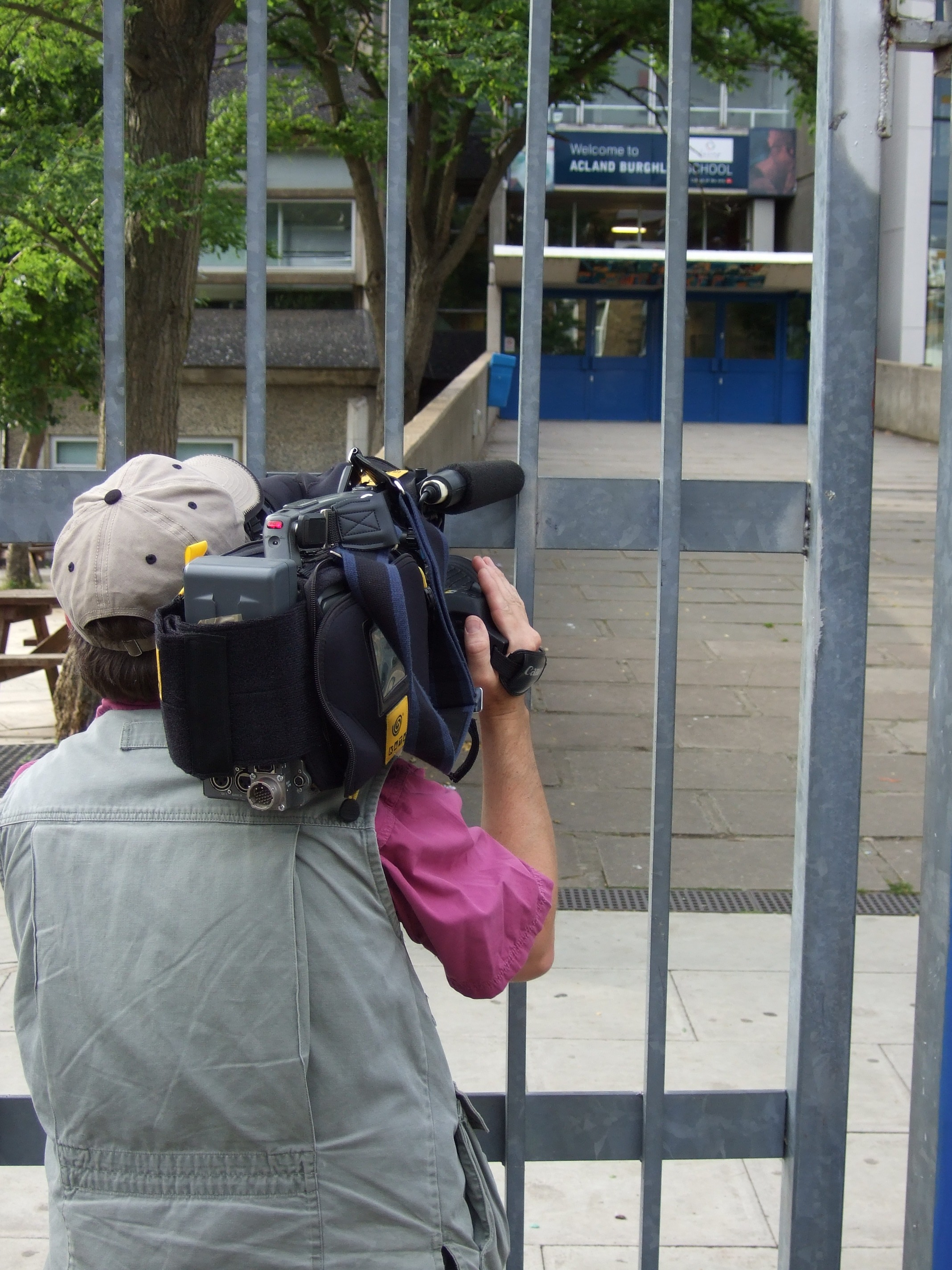
Filming outside of Acland Burghley School for the documentary for the DVD release of series one. This part of the school is seen in the show's opening titles.

All of the location shots for Chalk were filmed at the beginning of the production block. Acland Burghley School, in the Tufnell Park area of Camden, London, provided the exterior of the fictional Galfast High. The cast recall that it was difficult to perform comedy on location without a studio audience to gauge the reception and success of the jokes. Another school near Wembley was used for large interior shots, such as the school hall featured in the episode "The Inspection". Rehearsals took place in BBC premises in Acton, west London, colloquially known by those in the industry as the "Acton Hilton". David Bamber, his colleagues note, knew the script at the beginning of rehearsals and never dropped a line. The cast recall that director Juliet May provided a calm working environment; rather than losing her temper when things went wrong, she instead focussed everyone's mind on how to solve the problem.

After the exterior shots had been filmed, the episodes were recorded at BBC Television Centre in London. Most of the episodes were recorded in studios three or four, but occasionally the larger studio eight was used. After a week's rehearsals, the episodes were filmed on Sundays. The cast and crew would have a camera rehearsal followed by a dress run. After a supper, the cast were introduced to the studio audience. The studio audience responded very positively to the show during recordings. However, Moffat reflects that the show's style was not suited to the home audience. In a 2012 interview, he says:

Of any sitcom I've ever witnessed being made, and I've seen loads of them like Men Behaving Badly and The Vicar of Dibley, Chalk had the biggest laughs on the night. As a piece of theatre it was brilliant in the studio—people came back every week; the audiences were rapturous. The trouble was when I watched the tape at home, it was far too loud and raucous [for TV].

The BBC commissioned a second series based on the studio audience reactions during recordings. As development on series two had reached a relatively late stage when the first had received negative reviews upon transmission, it was too late to cancel the production. The cast and crew, then, had to work on a show which they knew was widely disliked. Moffat reflects on the experience: "There's no feeling on earth like working on a show that you know is doomed and already tanking."

BBC executives insisted that the title be changed as they felt that "Chalk" did not stand out in the schedules. They were also concerned that the title might be somewhat anachronistic because schools were beginning to use whiteboards rather than blackboards. Many people, including the actors, attempted to think of alternatives, but instead reverted to "Chalk".

Funding was running low towards the end of filming the first series. Moffat contrived an episode, "The Staff Meeting", where all of the main cast would be locked in the staff room to avoid paying for any guest actors. To reduce expenditure further, crew members were enlisted to provide the voices for the television news report at the end of the episode: producer Andre Ptaszynski played the broadcast journalist, whilst second assistant director Sarah Daman voiced the protesting student Gail Bennett. When a guest actor delivered an inadequate performance of the psychiatric doctor at the end of "The Inspection", Moffat coached assistant director Stacey Adair to perform the line. However, professional actor C.J. Allen lived near to the location and he was enlisted to deliver the line instead.

The expense and restrictions placed upon child actors limited the number of pupils that could be featured. The non-speaking extras had to be licensed, a process that took four weeks, providing difficulties for assistant director Stacey Adair. The episode "Both Called Eric" features Antony Costa as one of the pupils, one of his earliest TV roles before going on to appear in Grange Hill and in the boy band Blue.

== Episodes ==
Series	Episodes	Originally released	
Series	Episodes	First released	Last released
1	6	20 February 1997	27 March 1997
2	6	17 September 1997	22 October 1997

The sitcom is based at the fictional comprehensive school Galfast High. It begins with the arrival of the young new English teacher Suzie Travis (Nicola Walker). She immediately encounters the chaos of the school, a chaos enhanced by the manic Deputy Head Eric Slatt (David Bamber). The Guardian retrospectively commented that the show's "best episodes of ... manouevred their unwitting participants towards a climax of terrible sexual humiliation or violence."

Moffat integrated many references to secondary characters and locations from his previous BAFTA winning show Press Gang into Chalk. For instance, the Chalk character Eric Slatt refers to his neighbouring school Norbridge High, run by Mr Sullivan: these were the names of the school and deputy headmaster in Press Gang. The scene where Slatt is being given instructions by wire is taken from the unfilmed Press Gang movie Dead Line. The pornographic video Lesbian Spank Inferno, owned by Dan McGill in the final episode, is later referenced in the Coupling episode "Inferno". In an interview with The New York Times, Moffat admitted that the video is inspired by his then-new partner, Sue Vertue, finding a similar video in their VCR.

== Characters ==
Eric Slatt (David Bamber) is the deputy headmaster of Galfast High, who seems to "deepen the many crises that face the school (most of Slatt's own making)". Jeff Evans, writing in The Penguin TV Companion, observed that "Slatt is certainly keen, but regrettably he is also unbalanced, tactless, clumsy, snobby, sarcastic, at times pointlessly aggressive and always prone to appalling errors of judgment (an academic version of Basil Fawlty, it was widely noted)". The Independent commented: "Chalk is in the idiom of sadistic farce: disaster begets catastrophe begets apocalypse, and they all engulf Slatt. There are inevitable echoes of other sitcom characters—a dash of Basil Fawlty's unquenchable apoplexy, a slice of Gordon Brittas's purblind monomania—but Slatt's entanglements are caused by his own cocktail of failings." Nicola Walker commented that viewers sympathise with Slatt because he is in charge of a bunch of lunatics. Moffat told The Herald that Slatt was inspired by a real person:

My main character, the deputy head, is a manic git, and he's based on a guy I never actually met and is therefore being denigrated terribly. He had already retired by the time I started but I used to get a lift to work from his wife, who still worked there. And she would tell me stories about him with the affectionate disdain of anyone who has been married for more than a year. In the staff room, all these bitter teachers who hadn't been promoted would describe him as someone who would only briefly consider stopping short of invading Poland if he got the chance. I've since found out that the real man is actually a very nice bloke.

Ptaszynski had attempted to persuade his friend Angus Deayton, who wanted to move into more acting roles away from Have I Got News for You, to play Slatt. The producer reflects that Deayton would have brought a more "sardonic" element to the character. The cast regularly teased David Bamber during rehearsals, speculating upon how Deayton might have performed a particular line or sequence.

Janet Slatt (Geraldine Fitzgerald) is Eric's wife and the school's secretary. She has an antagonistic relationship with Eric, with each regularly the butt of the other's jokes. For instance, Eric suggests one morning that she had not shaved, and that she should rest her hind legs.

Suzy Travis (Nicola Walker) is a new English teacher who arrives at the school in the first episode. The press described Suzy as "the voice of sanity at Galfast High and the thorn in Slatt's side."

Amanda Trippley (Amanda Boxer) is the neurotic music teacher. Throughout the series, she invents her pupils to prevent her department being closed, uses the school's telephone network to surf the internet about Star Trek, and demands the return of a musical instrument from a former pupil now on death row.

Dan McGill (Martin Ball) is a young teacher who instantly develops a crush on Suzy when she arrives at the school, and attempts to date her throughout the series. The character is given most prominence in "The Staff Meeting" episode, which was written in order to save money by not having any guest actors. In this episode it is revealed that Dan has agreed to teach several subjects in order to keep his job. Suzy is dismayed to find that he invented an entire language when he became a foreign languages teacher, and then invented its country (Estranzia) when made a Geography teacher. After Ball's performance in that episode, Moffat promised him that he would not underwrite him in the second series.

Mr Humboldt (Andrew Livingston), a games teacher who is terrified that others might discover his sexuality. Slatt, who knows Humboldt's secret uses it to manipulate him, but Suzy (who assumes he is merely gay) encourages him to "come out". When he does so however, she is shocked to discover that he is actually a sadomasochist.

Mr Carkdale (John Grillo), the head of English, very rarely utters anything but expletives. Struggling to find a rationale for his character, Grillo paced up and down a rehearsal room carrying a brown briefcase, which he remembers all of his own teachers carrying around, and shouting profanities.

Mr Richard Nixon (John Wells) was the headteacher in the first series. Evans observes that he "shows precious little leadership", and the running of the school seems to fall to Slatt. Wells was too ill to participate in the second series, and died a year after its transmission.

Mr J.F. Kennedy (Duncan Preston) replaced Mr Nixon as the head in the second series. Like Nixon, Mr Kennedy takes a back-seat in the developments. In the final episode he reads a letter from the former head, which inadvertently serves to show how their characters are identical.

Jason Cockfoster (Damien Matthews) is a young religious education teacher. He arrives at the school in the first series episode "Both Called Eric", and appears more regularly in the second series. Suzy is immediately attracted to him, making Dan McGill so jealous that he tells the pupils that he is Satan. The character was a deliberate attempt to add some sex appeal to the show.

== Reception ==
Due to the positive reaction of the studio audience during recordings, a second series was commissioned before the first had started to be transmitted. However, the show was, as Mark Lawson summarised, "widely disliked". The BBC's publicity department compared Chalk to Fawlty Towers in the publicity materials. Critics, though, took exception to a new show being compared to such a renowned and respected programme. The cast point out that Fawlty Towers and Chalk are completely different shows, while Nicola Walker says that the comparison is like being asked to be "compared to a comedy God". Writing for the BBC Guide to Comedy, Mark Lewisohn observes that the critical reception was mixed, with "its detractors pointing out that Eric Slatt was a carbon copy of John Cleese's Basil Fawlty [and] its supporters praising its non-PC, off-the-wall approach and the breathlessly paced plots that delivered moments of high farce." Lewisohn also comments that while some elements of the show resemble Please Sir!, "Chalk more closely resembled the ill-fated Hardwicke House with its concentration on the teachers rather than the pupils, dark themes and overall depiction of the teachers as ... nuts." Tom Lappin for Scotland on Sunday derided the combination of Chris Barrie's Gordon Brittas and Cleese's Basil Fawlty.

The first four episodes were transmitted at 21:30, but the final two episodes of the second series were moved to 22:20. The second series received an unstable timeslot, being replaced in its more mainstream slot by Men Behaving Badly. Commenting on the second series, the Glasgow Herald said, "the manic depute head of Galfast High, Eric Slatt, is looking more and more like Basil Fawlty on a bad day. So are those of us who remain glued to it in ghoulish fascination to see if it can get any worse." Tabloid newspaper The Mirror published a damming review of the show's second series opener:

The head of comedy at Television Centre deserves six of the best for bringing back Chalk (BBC1) for a second term. If the opening episode of the new series is anything to go by, we are in for six of the worst half-hours of comedy in the history of television ... It is no surprise that the show has been relegated to a late slot. It is a watershed for smut. Some of the jokes were in the worst possible taste. The standards of comedy are so pitiful, Galfast High School should not have been given a grant from TV licence-payers' money and it is time it closed its gates for good. David Bamber ... deserves a better vehicle for his acting talents. He was lured into playing Eric Slatt because the character was supposed to be the classroom equivalent of Basil Fawlty. They are as different as Chalk and Cleese.

In an interview in the early 2000s, Moffat refused to even mention Chalk, joking that he might get attacked in the street. The first series received criticism from some teachers and teaching unions, who criticised the representation of their professions. Letters were printed in specialist publications such as the Education Guardian. The Association of Teachers and Lecturers labelled Chalk as "perverse" and "vapid", and its leader called upon the show to be axed. Teachers, according to the Daily Record, complained that the show portrayed teachers as "mentally unstable", and deterred people from entering the profession. John Grillo, who played Mr Carkdale, recalls that he was appearing in a West End play at the time he was auditioning for the role; a fellow actor in the play was meant to be auditioning for Chalk but, having been a deputy head teacher earlier in his career, was so disgusted by the material that he refused to attend. The unions' derision actually inspired The Times's Matthew Bond to like the show. However, despite identifying "genuine humour" such as Slatt's rant against French teachers, Bond's review is largely critical. He concedes, "the teaching organisations, you see, are half right. Slatt has no credible basis in the teaching profession, but far more importantly he has no credible basis in the human race. And what we don't believe in, we rarely find funny."

Kevin Lygo, the show's executive producer and head of Independent Commissions Entertainment, who commissioned the series defending the show from the union's criticisms, saying: "Chalk is a comedy. Just as Ben Elton's Thin Blue Line does not reflect the modern police force nor The Vicar of Dibley the Church of England today, Chalk was never intended to reflect life in British schools." Moffat said that Chalk was written "just for larks" and was not intended as a serious political diatribe. However, Scotland on Sunday responded in a piece placing Chalk in the context of other television shows about schools: "where such dramas fall down is not in shirking some contrived social responsibility but in their playing up to so many daft myths about the teaching profession. They could almost be written by one of those strange politicians who deny there is an education crises in Britain."

== Home release ==
The first three episodes were released on VHS in the United Kingdom on 7 September 1998 by BBC Video (now 2entertain). During a DVD audio commentary for Coupling, Moffat claims that "no-one bought it", including him.

The complete first series was released on Region 2 PAL DVD by ReplayDVD, the independent label that had released Joking Apart, on 15 December 2008. The disc contains audio commentaries on all six episodes; Nicola Walker, Martin Ball, Geraldine Fitzgerald and John Grillo commentate over four of the episodes, with David Bamber and Amanda Boxer contributing to the remaining two. All of the above, along with producer Andre Ptaszynski, also feature in a 45-minute retrospective documentary, After the Chalk Dust Settled.

Series 2 has received no home media release of any kind.
