= Paul Mark Elliott =

British actor

Paul-Mark Elliott
- Other name: Mark Elliott
- Occupation: Actor

Paul Mark Elliott is a British actor who has appeared in several television comedies and dramas. He is sometimes credited as Mark Elliott, or with the hyphen in his first name as Paul-Mark Elliot.

He had several small parts in shows during the 1980s, including in Blake's 7, The Comic Strip Presents (The Yob), Sister Said (with Daniel Peacock) and Blackadder Goes Forth. He also appears in Lovejoy (pig in a poke).

After appearing in the 1991 episode of Press Gang “Holding On”, he went on to play estate agent Trevor, Becky's (Fiona Gillies) lover, in two seasons of Steven Moffat’s Joking Apart.

As the crazed guitarist Bernie Cosmos he destroyed VU meters in the partially-improvised comedy 1994 film There's No Business..., starring Raw Sex (Simon Brint and Rowland Rivron) and The Oblivion Boys.

He appeared in That Peter Kay Thing (ep6, Lonely at the top),Absolutely Fabulous, Murder Most Horrid, Holding the Baby and Baddiel's Syndrome.

In 2001, he appeared in Spaced and as Fenton Beasley in the famous "Pædophilia" episode of Brass Eye.

In the 2000s, he mainly acted in straight dramas, in shows including The Bill, Holby City and Doctors. He also narrated a five programme, "Daniella Westbrook: EastEnders, drugs and my new nose", in October 2005.
