= Frankenstein (1992 film) =

- Genre: Horror; Period drama Science fiction
- Based on: Frankenstein by Mary Shelley
- Written by: David Wickes
- Directed by: David Wickes
- Starring: Patrick Bergin; Randy Quaid; John Mills; Lambert Wilson; Fiona Gillies
- Music by: John Cameron
- Countries of origin: United Kingdom; United States
- Original language: English

Production
- Executive producer: David Wickes
- Production locations: WFF Film Studio, Wrocław, Poland
- Cinematography: Jack Conroy
- Editor: John Grover
- Running time: 117 minutes
- Production companies: Turner Pictures; David Wickes Productions

Original release
- Network: TNT
- Release: 29 December 1992

Frankenstein is a 1992 science fiction horror television film, based on Mary Shelley's 1818 novel Frankenstein; or, The Modern Prometheus. It was produced by Turner Pictures, and written and directed by David Wickes.

The film stars Patrick Bergin as Dr. Frankenstein and Randy Quaid as Dr. Frankenstein's creation. It also features John Mills, Lambert Wilson, and Fiona Gillies. The film premiered on December 29, 1992, and aired on TNT on June 14, 1993.

== Plot ==
In the 19th century, an icebound ship in the Arctic Ocean encounters two men on dogsleds trying to kill each other. They rescue one of the men, who says he is Dr. Victor Frankenstein, and tells the captain his story.

Victor was a professor and researcher in Ingolstadt, Germany, in 1818. Using chemical elements and magnetic fields, he is able to create artificial life. He is creating a man, with himself as the template. An accident during the process brings the creature prematurely to life, unfinished and malformed. Frankenstein, suffering from cholera after treating victims of an outbreak, is unable to stop the Creature from escaping the laboratory.

The Creature is met with fear, hostility, and violence by the people he encounters. Victor returns home to Geneva, Switzerland, to recover, but finds that he and the Creature share a psychic bond; whenever the Creature is injured, Victor feels it.

The Creature is taken in DeLacey, an old blind man living in the woods. He tends to the Creature's injuries and teaches him to speak. When hunters discover the Creature, he's forced to leave the safety of DeLacey's cabin. The link they share draws the Creature to find Frankenstein.

The Creature becomes infatuated with Justine, a neighbor of the Frankensteins, and tries to court her, but she's terrified and tries to run away. William, Victor's younger brother, arrives and tries to defend Justine, but is killed in the fight.

Victor pursues the Creature, determined to avenge William's death. When the Creature and his creator finally meet, the Creature demands that Victor make him a female companion. If Victor does this, the Creature promises to go away and never return.

Victor returns to his laboratory in Ingolstadt with Elizabeth, his fiancé, who volunteers to be the template for the Creature's bride. The process proves to painful and overwhelming for her, and Frankenstein stops the experiment, destroying the artificial woman before she can be completed. The outraged Creature storms the lab and is seemingly electrocuted by Victor's apparatus.

Victor and Elizabeth are married, unaware that the Creature has survived. As they prepare to leave on their honeymoon, the Creature attacks, killing Victor's father, his best friend Clerval, and finally Elizabeth. Victor is accused of the murders, but escapes before being taken into custody. He swears to hunt down his creation and destroy it. The pursuit begins.

His story told, Victor asks the ship's captain to help him destroy the Creature. A team is sent to ambush the Creature, but they're all killed. The Creature boards the ship and confronts Frankenstein. Explaining that their psychic bond prevents one from killing the other, Victor grabs the Creature and jumps into the frozen sea, where they both drown.

== Cast ==
- Patrick Bergin as Dr. Frankenstein
- Randy Quaid as Frankenstein's monster
- John Mills as De Lacey
- Lambert Wilson as Dr. Clerval
- Fiona Gillies as Elizabeth
- Jacinta Mulcahy as Justine
- Timothy Stark as William
- Roger Bizley as the Captain

== Production ==
The score was composed by John Cameron.

== Reception ==
On review aggregator website Rotten Tomatoes, the film holds an approval rating of 17% based on 6 reviews, and an average rating of 3.3/10. Variety described the film's direction as "florid" and said, 'Bergin doesn’t do much convincing as the in-love Victor, but Quaid’s Bigfoot account of the sensitive, inwardly powerful Monster (designed imaginatively by Mark Coulier) suffices.'

== Home releases ==
A VHS of Frankenstein was released by Turner Home Entertainment in 1993. The DVD is available as part of Warner Archive.
