= The Unfriend =

2022 play by Steven Moffat

- Original language: English
- Written by: Steven Moffat
- Characters: Debbie; Elsa; Peter; Rosie; The Neighbour; PC Junkin; Alex

Premiere
- Date: 21 May 2022
- Place: Minerva Theatre, Chichester

The Unfriend is a play written by Steven Moffat. The plot centres on suburban couple Peter and Debbie, whose polite invitation to a stranger on holiday has dire consequences.

== Production ==
The play was due to premiere at the Minerva Theatre, Chichester as part of the 2020 Festival. However, due to the COVID-19 pandemic the play was postponed to 2022. The play began previews on 21 May 2022, with a press night on 26 May. It ended its planned limited run on 9 July 2022. The play is directed by Mark Gatiss (in his directorial debut), designed by Robert Jones, lighting design by Mark Henderson and starring Amanda Abbington, Frances Barber and Reece Shearsmith.

The playtext was published by Nick Hern Books on 26 May 2021.

The Unfriend transferred to the West End, opening at the Criterion Theatre on 19 January 2023, following previews from 15 January. It played a limited run to 16 April 2023, with the original cast from Chichester all returning.

In July 2023, it was announced the play would return for another West End run at the Wyndham's Theatre, starring Lee Mack, Sarah Alexander and Frances Barber returning as Elsa, with performances between 16 December 2023 and 9 March 2024.

== Cast and characters ==
Character	Chichester	West End	West End Remount
Character	2022	2023	
Debbie	Amanda Abbington	Amanda Abbington	Sarah Alexander
Elsa	Frances Barber	Frances Barber	Frances Barber
Peter	Reece Shearsmith	Reece Shearsmith	Lee Mack
Rosie	Maddie Holliday	Maddie Holliday	Maddie Holliday
The Neighbour	Michael Simkins	Michael Simkins	Nick Sampson
PC Junkin	Marcus Onilude	Marcus Onilude	Muzz Khan
Alex	Gabriel Howell	Gabriel Howell	Jem Matthews

== Critical reception ==
The Chichester production of the play received positive reviews from WhatsOnStage.com, The Daily Telegraph, The Stage and The Guardian.

Timeout magazine described the West End production as "Waffly, unfocused and above all, bland".
