= Roger Longrigg =

British novelist (1929-2000)

Roger Erskine Longrigg (1 May 1929 – 26 February 2000) was a prolific British novelist. As well as publishing some books under his own name, he principally wrote popular novels in a wide range of different styles, using different pseudonyms for each. He wrote the lightly erotic school story, The Passion Flower Hotel, as Rosalind Erskine; Scottish historical novels as Laura Black; spy thrillers as Ivor Drummond; mystery thrillers as Frank Parrish; and black comedies about dysfunctional families as Domini Taylor. His other pseudonyms included Megan Barker and Grania Beckford. He had 55 books published in total.

== Life ==
Roger Longrigg was born in Edinburgh, Scotland, the son of a brigadier. He lived as a child in the Middle East, where his father was stationed, but returned to England to study at Bryanston School. He then read History at Magdalen College, Oxford. After completing his degree, he started working for an advertising agency in 1955, before writing two comic novels, A High-Pitched Buzz (1956) and Switchboard (1957), based on his experiences there. Both were published under his real name.

In 1959 he married, and decided to become a full-time writer, adopting different styles and pseudonyms to suit different audiences. He published under eight pseudonyms. His real identity was kept secret. One of his most successful novels, written as Rosalind Erskine, was The Passion Flower Hotel (1962), a story of how 15-year-old girls at a boarding school establish a brothel to cater for boys from a nearby school. The mystery surrounding the true authorship of the book was eventually revealed by the "William Hickey" column of the Daily Express. The novel was later turned into a stage musical scripted by Wolf Mankowitz, a radio play, and a film starring Nastassja Kinski.

Longrigg appears to be the first writer to turn Jane Austen's fiction into erotica, with Virtues and Vices: A Delectable Rondelet of Love and Lust in Edwardian Times (1980), a bawdy, comic rewriting of Persuasion set a century after the original version. He wrote the novel under the pseudonym Grania Beckford.

On another occasion, as Frank Parrish, he was awarded the John Cheever mystery writers' prize for a first published thriller, creating some embarrassment when it was revealed that in fact it was his 20th published book. A later novel, Mother Love (1983), credited to Domini Taylor, was adapted into a TV series of the same title in 1989, starring Diana Rigg and David McCallum. He also wrote books about horse racing and fox hunting.

In 1995, the bookseller John Francis Phillimore declared in an interview that Roger Longrigg's horse-racing adventure story Daughters of Mulberry (1961) "is the greatest book ever written in any language by anybody. Everyone who has read it agrees with me."

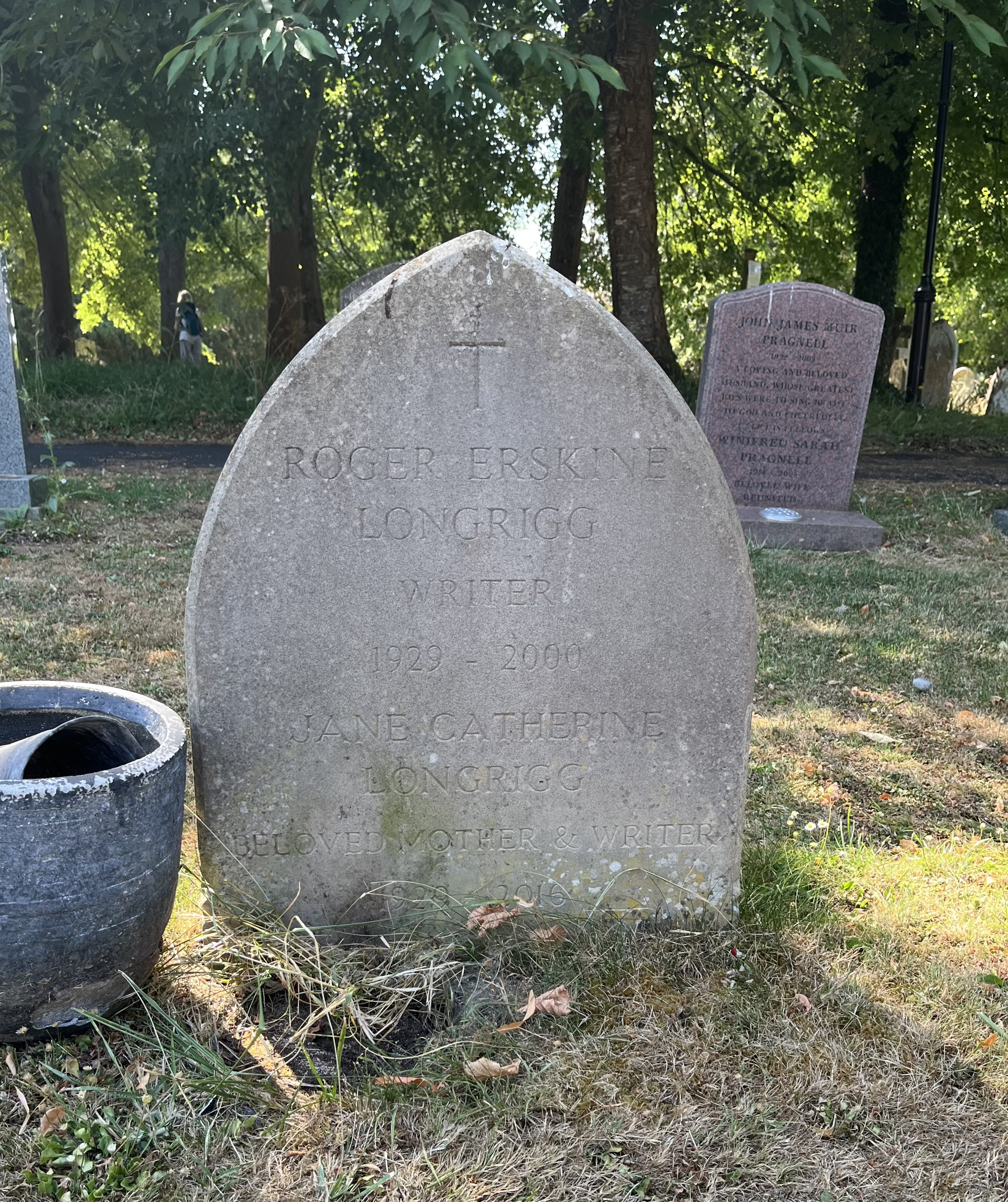
The grave of Roger Longrigg in Crondall in Hampshire

Longrigg died in Farnham, Surrey, at the age of 70. His New York Times obituary says that he was married to "the novelist Jane Chichester", and that they had three children. In Christopher Fowler's article about Longrigg, he says that he has not been able to find anything out about Jane Chichester.

He was buried in the churchyard of All Saints Church in Crondall in Hampshire.
