= Geraldine Fitzgerald (British actress) =

British actress

Geraldine Fitzgerald is a British actress who has appeared in many stage shows and television programmes.

Having appeared in minor roles in various shows, her first major television role was as Janet Slatt in Steven Moffat's school sitcom Chalk. Two series were broadcast in 1997. In 2008 she contributed to the audio commentary for the DVD release of the first series.

In March 2006, she joined the cast of the West End production of Mamma Mia! as Tanya after appearing in the international touring production of the show.

She has also appeared on The Bill, and as Ellen Grantham in Doctors.
