= Mother Love (TV series) =

1989 BBC British television drama

- Created by: Domini Taylor (novel)
- Written by: Andrew Davies
- Directed by: Simon Langton
- Starring: Diana Rigg; David McCallum; James Wilby; Fiona Gillies
- Composer: Patrick Gowers
- Country of origin: United Kingdom
- Original language: English
- No. of series: 1
- No. of episodes: 4

Production
- Producer: Ken Riddington
- Production locations: London, England, UK
- Cinematography: Nigel Walters
- Running time: 55 minutes
- Production company: BBC

Original release
- Network: BBC1
- Release: 29 October – 19 November 1989

Mother Love is a 1989 BBC British television drama. It was adapted by Andrew Davies from Domini Taylor's (Roger Longrigg's) 1983 novel concerning a mother's obsessive love for her son, vengeful hatred of his father, her ex-husband, and the effect on her daughter-in-law and grandchildren. It starred Diana Rigg, David McCallum, James Wilby, and Fiona Gillies, and was directed by Simon Langton.

Christopher "Kit" Vesey (James Wilby) and Angela Vesey (Fiona Gillies), a British yuppie couple, enjoy a seemingly idyllic life. Yet there is one troubling factor in their lives - Kit's mother Helena (Diana Rigg), an eccentric and often difficult woman consumed by anger with Kit's father (David McCallum), a famed conductor with whom she believes Kit has no contact. Her oddness is confirmed in a series of incidents involving her ex-husband and his second wife Ruth (Isla Blair), an artist. Flashbacks throughout the series reveal bits of Helena's troubled past. Little by little, the young couple's life begins to fall apart as Helena begins to act out her feelings of intense jealousy and desire for revenge, implicating a dear old friend and leading to murder.

== Cast ==
- Diana Rigg as Helena
- James Wilby as Kit
- David McCallum as Alex
- Fiona Gillies as Angela
- Isla Blair as Ruth
- James Grout as George Batt
- Liliana Komorowska as Danuta
- Ann Firbank as Mrs Turner
- Jeffry Wickham as Brigadier Turner
- Holly Aird as Emily
- Amelia Shankley as Harriet
- Deborah Grant as Helena's Mother
- Gareth Forwood as Boris
- Louisa Janes as Young Helena
- Colin Stinton as Concert Hall Manager
- John Grillo, Carl Duering as Art Critics
- Jonathan Burn as Chief Inspector Strachan
- Trevor Cooper as Sergeant Bear

== Plot ==
Kit Vesey, a London barrister, has proposed to Angela Turner, a receptionist at an art gallery. He is fearful about breaking this news to his fiercely controlling mother, Helena, but she is surprisingly cordial to the union. Kit also insists that Angela not mention anything to Helena about their visits to his father Alex, who divorced Helena and remarried many years ago. Helena has blocked all mention of Alex from her life and had even attempted suicide when Kit once suggested going to live with him.

Accepted by Helena, the Veseys settle into marriage and have two children, all the while maintaining a secret relationship with Alex and his new family. However, when Helena watches an arts programme about Alex's wife Ruth, a renowned photographer, she is outraged to see that her long-time friend, George, has apparently maintained a friendship with Alex and Ruth. Helena decides to kill Ruth by locking her in her darkroom with the ventilators blocked and contrives evidence to convict George of the murder.

While visiting Rome, now-widowed Alex meets Jordan, an American actress whom he subsequently marries and who later gives birth to twins. Kit has been in a coma following surgery on a brain tumour, so Helena comes to tend to him in hospital but starts to uncover other evidence about Angela and her children's regular visits to Alex and his family. After watching Angela leave Alex's home and interpreting the evident affection between the two of them as evidence that Angela was having an affair with Alex, Helena becomes increasingly unhinged. While at the hospital one day, she informs the paralysed Kit that she intends to poison Alex and Jordan's twins using laburnum in revenge for the pair's 'treachery.' Having tested the effectiveness of laburnum on a neighbour's cat, Helena laces some marzipan shortbreads with the poison and gives them to her grandchildren, who both dislike marzipan, knowing that they would likely give them to the twins at Alex's party.

Helena's plan fails, however, as another child at the party, Olivia, steals one of the shortbreads while the rest of the guests are outside taking photos, and she is subsequently discovered in a convulsive state in the garden. After the family receive a strange call purporting to be from the hospital, Angela realises that it must have been Helena who poisoned the shortbreads and who had called the family only to be told that Alex's family did have contact with Kit. Angela rushes to the hospital at the same time as Helena starts removing Kit from his life support machine for his 'treachery', arriving to find Helena embracing Kit whilst he struggles to breathe. Angela calls the nurses, who discover that Helena had, in fact, forced him out of his paralysis. The final scene shows Helena in a prison cell, staring emptily at a wall.

== Awards ==
Diana Rigg won the British Academy Television Award for Best Actress for her portrayal of Helena.

BAFTA nominations for Mother Love included: Best Drama Series/Serial - Ken Riddington, Simon Langton, Andrew Davies. Best Film Editor - Ray Wingrove. Best Film Sound - Barrie Tharby, Keith Marriner, Graham Lawrence.

== Broadcasts ==
Mother Love first aired in its original four parts from 29 October to 19 November 1989 on BBC One with a BBC Two repeat the following year. In 1991 it was broadcast on the PBS programme Mystery!, of which Rigg was the host. It was broadcast on Sky Arts in the early 2010s.

Following the death of Diana Rigg, it was repeated on 22–23 December 2020 on BBC Four in two parts. Mother Love received a further repeat on Talking Pictures TV in March 2026.

Preceded by A Very British Coup	British Academy Television Awards; Best Drama Series or Serial; 1990	Succeeded by Oranges Are Not the Only Fruit
