= Amanda Abbington =

English actress (born 1972)

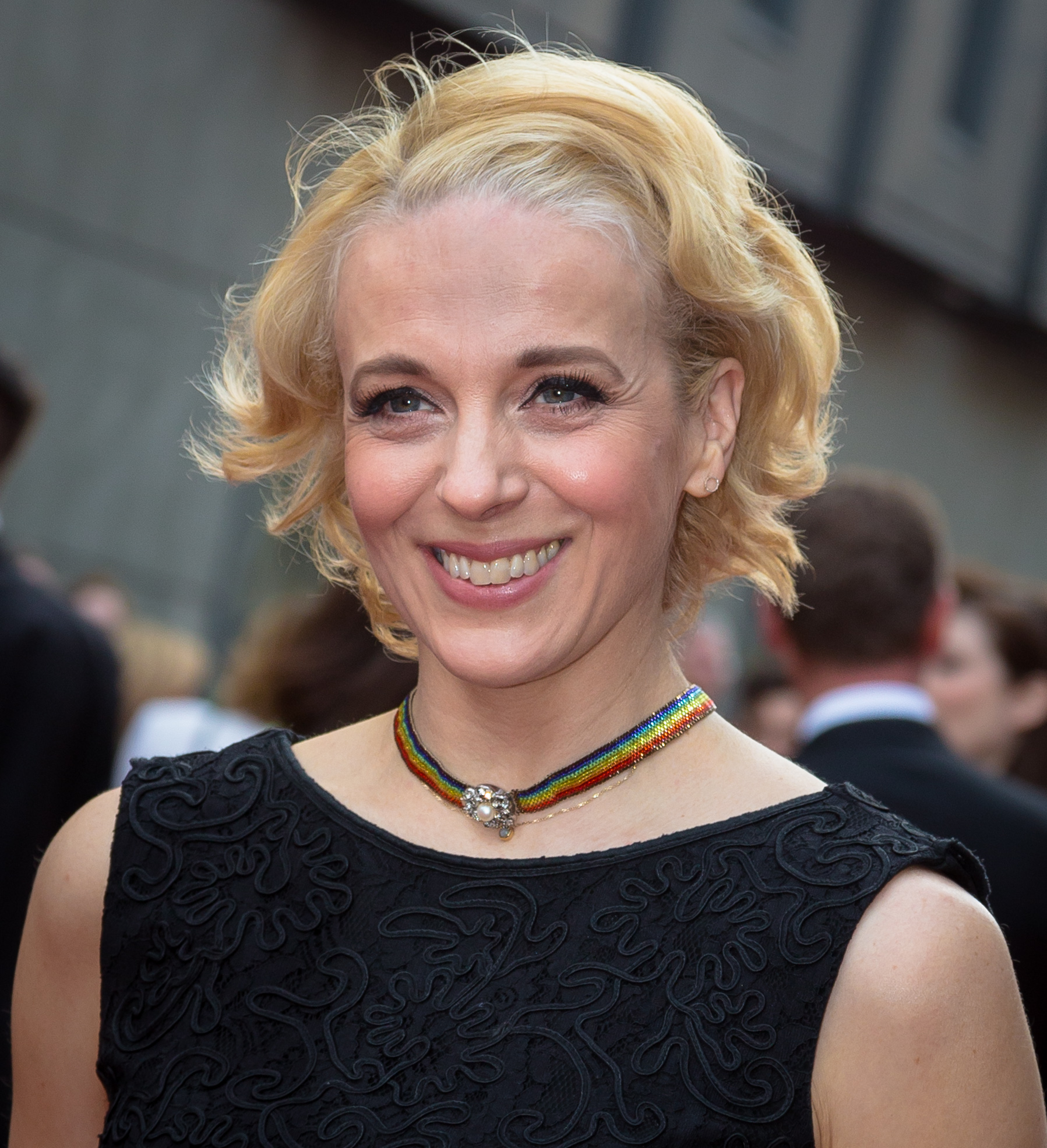
- Abbington in 2015
- Born: 1972 (age 53–54); North London, England
- Occupation: Actress
- Years active: 1993–present
- Partners: Martin Freeman (2000–2016); Jonathan Goodwin (2021–present; engaged)
- Children: 2

Amanda Abbington (born Amanda Smith; 1972) is an English actress. In a career spanning over 30 years, she has appeared in numerous television dramas and theatrical productions. Her most prominent roles include Josie Mardle in Mr Selfridge (2013–2016) and Mary Morstan in Sherlock (2014–2017).

Her other credits include Marilyn Harwood in Dream Team (1999–2000) and Siobhan in the BBC sitcom After You've Gone (2007–2008), as well as appearances in the drama series Cuffs (2015) and Safe (2018). Her stage roles have included God of Carnage (2018), The Son (2019) and The Unfriend (2022–2023).

== Early life ==
Abbington was born in north London, England. An only child, she was brought up in Hertfordshire.

== Career ==
She appeared in the TV series The Bill until 2007, playing various characters. During that time she also appeared in the TV series Wycliffe, Casualty, Dream Team, The Sins, Shades, Doc Martin, Coupling and Teachers. She appeared in the 2005 comedy sketch show Man Stroke Woman, and the 2007–2008 comedy After You've Gone with Nicholas Lyndhurst. She has also appeared in recurring series such as Bernard's Watch and Case Histories.

In 2013, she began appearing in the television series Mr Selfridge as Miss Mardle, alongside Jeremy Piven and Frances O'Connor. In 2014, Abbington appeared as Mary Morstan, the wife of John Watson, played by her then real-life partner Martin Freeman, in the third series of Sherlock the BBC adaptation of Arthur Conan Doyle's Sherlock Holmes stories. In 2015 she appeared in the BBC TV crime drama series Cuffs.

On stage, Abbington appeared in August 2018 in the role of Annette in God of Carnage at the Theatre Royal, Bath, and in 2019 as the character Anne in Florian Zeller's play The Son, at the Kiln Theatre in Kilburn, London; later that year, the play was transferred to The Duke of York's Theatre in London's West End.

In 2023, Abbington starred in the four-part Channel 5 television series Desperate Measures, and appeared as Dana Beckman in an episode of Inside No. 9.

In August 2023, Abbington was announced as a participant in the twenty-first series of Strictly Come Dancing. She was partnered with Giovanni Pernice but withdrew from the competition on 23 October 2023, after being absent with illness from the show broadcast three days before. It was later reported that her departure was due to a disagreement over Pernice's training methods and that she requested footage of her time training with Pernice and was seeking legal advice against Pernice; Pernice denied all accusations of wrongdoing. In July 2024, in an interview broadcast on Channel 4 News, Abbington said that she received rape and death threats on social media following her withdrawal from the show.

In 2024, Abbington joined other former cast members of Inside No. 9 who returned to play fictionalised versions of themselves in its final episode.

== Personal life ==
Abbington was the partner of Martin Freeman, whom she met on the set of the film Men Only in 2000. The couple appeared together on screen in productions such as The Debt, The Robinsons, The Good Night and Sherlock. They have a son and daughter and lived in Potters Bar, Hertfordshire before their separation in 2016.

Abbington is engaged to escapologist and stunt performer Jonathan Goodwin. She and Goodwin had met on Twitter in 2012. The two began dating in late 2021, and Goodwin proposed marriage within 30 minutes of their first date, in Vienna. Goodwin was paralyzed in a stunt in October 2021, just weeks after they became engaged; in 2023, he revealed that he offered her the chance to call off their engagement, but "[T]hankfully she told me not to be so stupid and we've been very happy ever since." The couple live in Hertfordshire.

=== Bankruptcy ===
In 2013 Abbington was declared bankrupt over an unpaid £120,000 (equivalent to £168,300 in 2025) tax bill. She later commented, "It's being paid off now. I would never want to go through this again. But I'm paying it off [...] It was just me not managing my finances properly. I was putting some money away (to pay tax), but not all of it. I was working one year and not working another year. So I was using the money I'd saved".

=== Views ===
In March 2023, Abbington tweeted that a drag queen show for parents and babies that included topless performers was "Not for babies. And if you think it is, there is something fundamentally wrong with you." Following the announcement of her participation in Strictly Come Dancing, some social media users condemned Abbington for her comments, accusing her of transphobia and threatening to boycott the show. Abbington denied she was transphobic and said she had been upset about "a 12-year-old doing something very over-sexualised and I didn't think it was right."

== Filmography ==
=== Film ===
Year	Title	Role	Notes
1996	The Bill: Target	Lady Car Driver	Direct-to-video, feature-length
2001	Men Only	Trina	TV film
2001	Saving Grace	Isobel Green	
2003	The Debt	Stacey Ross	TV film
2005	Derailed	Kerry Hodder	TV film
2005	The Booze Cruise II: The Treasure Hunt	Leone	TV film
2006	The Booze Cruise III: The Scattering	Leone	TV film
2007	The Good Night	Vivian Jesson	
2007	The All Together	Sarah	
2011	Swinging with the Finkels	Lesbian #2	
2011	Ghosted	Tracy	
2013	Joe Mistry	Katherine	TV film
2016	Bring Back the Cat	Mrs. Patricia Ellison	Short film
2017	Another Mother's Son	Ivy Forster	
2017	Crooked House	Clemency Leonides	
2018	We the Kings	Rosa	
2018	The Queen and I	Anne, Princess Royal	TV film
2019	Six Days of Sistine	Angelina	
2020	Make Me Famous	Amanda	TV film
2021	Three Pints and a Rabbi	Lisa	
2021	Decrypted	Connie	
2022	The Lost King	Chair of funding committee, Sheila Lock	
2024	The Spaceman	Sue	Short film

=== Television ===
Year	Title	Role	Notes
1993	The Bill	Kirstey Tate	Episode: "Picking a Winner"
1997	Plotlands	Maude	Series regular, 6 episodes
1997	The Bill	Sarah Hall	Episode: "Copier"
1997	Wycliffe	Local W.P.C.	Episode: "Strangers Home"
1998	No Sweat	Chantelle	Episode: "Moon Boy"
1998	Magic with Everything	Cat	Series regular, 6 episodes
1998	Picking Up the Pieces	Staff Nurse Hunter	Series regular, 6 episodes
1999	Casualty	Jen Reynolds	Episode: "Human Traffic"
1999	Snap	Zoe	Episode: "Missed Her Sister"
1999	The Bill	Laura Denny	Episode: "On Air"
1999–2000	Dream Team	Marilyn Harwood	Series regular, 41 episodes
2000	The Thing About Vince...	Lisa	Mini-series, 2 episodes
2000	The Sins	Belinda Edgeley	Mini-series, 2 episodes
2001	Hearts and Bones	Mia	Episode: "Series 2, episode 6"
2001	Shades	Rebecca Jacobs	Mini-series, 1 episode
2002	Always and Everyone	Tessa	Episodes: "Out of Time", "Warrior's Heart" & "Do Not Pass Go"
2003	20 Things to Do Before You're 30	Shona	Series regular, 8 episodes
2004	Bernard's Watch	Sonia	Recurring role, 9 episodes
2004	Coupling	Nicola	Episodes: "9½ Minutes" & "Nightlines"
2004	Teachers	Sarah	Episode: "Series 4, episode 3"
2005	The Robinsons	Polly	Series regular, 5 episodes
2005–2007	Man Stroke Woman	Various roles	Series regular, 12 episodes
2007	The Bill	Rachel Inns	Episodes: "A Model Murder", "Model Murder Uncovered" & "Caught by the Killer"
2007	Doc Martin	Isobel	Episode: "Happily Ever After"
2007	Sold	Zoe	Episode: "Series 1, episode 6"
2007–2008	After You've Gone	Siobhan	Series regular, 21 episodes
2008	Harley Street	Susie Linn	Episode: "Series 1, episode 2"
2008	Coming Up	Daughter	Episode: "Lickle Bill Um"
2008	Agatha Christie's Poirot	Miss Blake	Episode: "Cat Among the Pigeons"
2009	Psychoville	Caroline	Episode: "Blackmail"
2010	Married Single Other	Babs	Series regular, 6 episodes
2010	Money	Doris Artthur	Mini-series, 2 episodes
2011	Postcode	Anna	Recurring role, 3 episodes
2011–2013	Case Histories	D.I. Louise Munroe	Series regular, 9 episodes
2012	Being Human	Golda	Episode: "Puppy Love"
2013–2016	Mr Selfridge	Josie Mardle	Series regular, 36 episodes
2014	Dinopaws	Gwen (voice)	Recurring role, 10 episodes
2014–2017	Sherlock	Mary Morstan	Series regular, 7 episodes
2015	Cuffs	D.S. Jo Moffat	Series regular, 8 episodes
2016	Stag	Fran	Mini-series, 2 episodes
2017	Uncle	Siobhan	Episode: "...Is This Just Fantasy?"
2018	Safe	D.S. Sophie Mason	Series regular, 8 episodes
2019	Flack	Alexa	Episodes: "Brooke" & "Alexa"
2020	Unsaid Stories	Lyndsey	Mini-series, 1 episode
2020	I Hate Suzie	Charon Bander	Episode: "Anger"
2021	Wolfe	Dot	Series regular, 6 episodes
2022	We Are Not Alone	Caroline Grieves	TV film
2022	The Net	Erika Green	Mini Series
2023	Lockwood & Co.	Marissa Fittes	Episode: "Sweet Dreams"
2023	The Family Pile	Nicole	Series regular
2023	Desperate Measures	Rowan Taylor	Mini series, 4 episodes
2023	Inside No. 9	Dana Beckman	Episode: "Paraskevidekatriaphobia"
2024	Inside No. 9	Herself	Episode: "Plodding On"
2026	Hunting Alice Bell	Julie	Mini-series. 6 episodes

=== Theatre ===
Year	Title	Role	Venue
2002	The Safari Party	Bridget	Stephen Joseph Theatre, Scarborough & Hampstead Theatre, London
2002	Something Blue	Pam	Stephen Joseph Theatre, Scarborough
2004	Love Me Tonight	Sian	Hampstead Theatre, London
2014	God Bless the Child	Sally Rayner	Royal Court Theatre, London
2017	Abigail's Party	Beverly Moss	Theatre Royal, Bath
2018	God of Carnage	Annette Reille	Theatre Royal, Bath
2018	A Little Princess	Miss Minchin	Royal Festival Hall, London
2019	The Son	Anne	Kiln Theatre, London
2022	The Unfriend	Debbie	Minerva Theatre, Chichester
2023	The Unfriend	Debbie	Criterion Theatre
2024	When It Happens to You	Tara	Park Theatre

== Awards and nominations ==
Year	Award	Category	Work	Result
2011	Crime Thriller Awards	Best Supporting Actress	Case Histories	Nominated
2014	Critics' Choice Television Awards	Best Supporting Actor in a Movie/Miniseries	Sherlock	Nominated
2014	Crime Thriller Awards	Best Supporting Actress	Sherlock	Won
