= André Ptaszynski =

British theatre and television producer (1953–2020)

- Born: 7 May 1953; Ipswich, Suffolk, England
- Died: 29 July 2020 (aged 67)
- Occupations: Theatre executive and producer

André Ptaszynski (7 May 1953 – 29 July 2020) was a British theatre and television producer. He was Chief Executive of the Really Useful Group from 2005 to 2011 and Chief Executive of Really Useful Theatres from 2000 to 2005.

== Early life and education ==
Ptaszynski was born in Ipswich to Władysław Ptaszyński, a Polish officer who was released from a prisoner of war camp in the Soviet Union, and Joan Holmes, his father's English teacher. He studied English at Jesus College, Oxford.

Prior to 2000, he ran his own theatre and TV production company. Amongst other shows, he was sole or co-producer on five which won Best Musical Olivier Awards and/or Evening Standard Awards in the 1990s: Return to the Forbidden Planet, Show Boat, Tommy, Chicago and Spend Spend Spend. He also promoted many comedians including Rowan Atkinson, Dave Allen, Rik Mayall, Victoria Wood, Eddie Izzard, The League of Gentlemen and Armstrong and Miller.

He produced four BBC television series. The first was Tygo Road, starring Kevin McNally, which lasted six episodes in 1990. The veteran sitcom director Bob Spiers introduced Ptaszynski to writer Steven Moffat suggesting that Moffat should write a sitcom. Moffat pitched an idea about a sitcom set in a school, but as the writer was talking passionately about his divorce, Ptaszynski convinced him to write about that instead. The show became Joking Apart won the Bronze Rose at the Montreux Television Festival in 1995. Like Tygo Road, the show was developed from the Comic Asides series of pilots. The producer contributed to the DVD audio commentary for the second series.

Moffat’s proposal of a school sitcom was resurrected for Ptaszynski’s next television project after the second series of Joking Apart was broadcast. Two series of Chalk were transmitted on BBC One in 1997.

His final television projects were the sketch/variety The Lenny Beige Television Show and a Saturday Night BBC1 series with Ainsley Harriott, The Hidden Camera Show.

He was a president of the Society of London Theatre and was on the board of the Royal National Theatre from 2001 to 2010.

== Personal life ==
Ptaszynski married Judith Terry in 1985. Their children include the writer and podcaster Anna. He died on 29 July 2020, at the age of 67.
