= Steven Moffat =

Scottish television writer and producer (born 1961)

Steven Moffat OBE
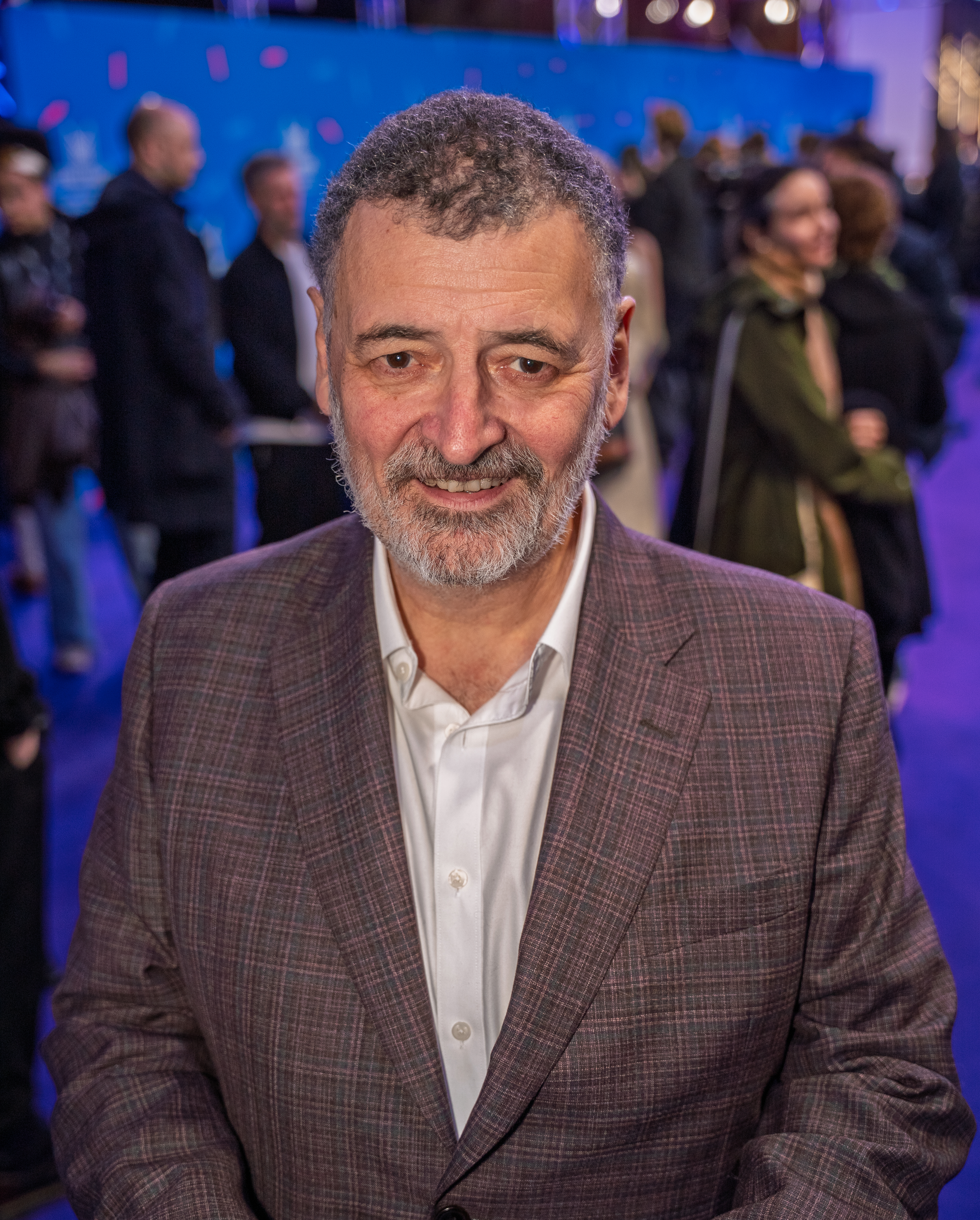
- Moffat in 2026
- Born: Steven William Moffat; 18 November 1961 (age 64); Paisley, Renfrewshire, Scotland
- Education: University of Glasgow
- Occupations: Television writer, television producer, and screenwriter
- Spouse: Sue Vertue (m. 1997)
- Children: 2
- Writing career
- Period: 1988–present
- Genres: Comedy, drama, adventure, science fiction

Steven William Moffat (/ˈmɒfət/; born 18 November 1961) is a Scottish television writer, television producer and screenwriter. He is best known for his work as the second showrunner and head writer of the 2005 revival of the BBC sci-fi television series Doctor Who (2010–2017), and for co-creating and co-writing the BBC crime drama television series Sherlock (2010–2017). In the 2015 Birthday Honours, Moffat was appointed Officer of the Order of the British Empire (OBE) for his services to drama.

Born in Paisley, Scotland, Moffat, the son of a teacher, was formerly a teacher himself. His first television work was the teen drama series Press Gang. His first sitcom, Joking Apart, was inspired by the breakdown of his first marriage. Later in the 1990s, he wrote Chalk, inspired by his own experience as an English teacher. Moffat, a lifelong fan of Doctor Who, wrote the comedic sketch episode The Curse of Fatal Death for the Comic Relief charity telethon, which aired in early 1999. His early-2000s sitcom Coupling was based upon the development of his relationship with television producer Sue Vertue.

In March 2004, Moffat was announced as one of the writers for the revived Doctor Who series. He wrote six episodes during Russell T Davies' first era as head writer, which aired from 2005 to 2008. Moffat's scripts during this era won him three Hugo Awards, a BAFTA Craft Award, and a BAFTA Cymru Award. Between episodes, he wrote and produced the modern-day drama series Jekyll, based on the novella Strange Case of Dr Jekyll and Mr Hyde. In May 2008, it was announced that Moffat would succeed Davies as showrunner, lead writer and executive producer of Doctor Who. Around the same time, he dropped his contract with film director Steven Spielberg for a film trilogy based on artist Hergé's character Tintin. Part of the lone script he wrote was used in Spielberg's film The Adventures of Tintin, eventually released in 2011.

Moffat's work in the 2010s consisted mainly of his period as the head writer of Doctor Who during the fifth through tenth series, in which he won another Hugo, and Sherlock, which won Moffat a BAFTA Craft Award and two Primetime Emmy Awards. In the 2020s, he wrote the BBC and Netflix drama co-productions Dracula (2020) and Inside Man (2022), the HBO sci-fi romance mini-series The Time Traveler's Wife (2022), and the ITV comedy-drama Douglas Is Cancelled (2024). In 2024, he returned to Doctor Who to write two episodes for Davies' second tenure as showrunner.

== Early life ==
Moffat was born in Paisley, Scotland, where he attended Camphill High School. He studied at the University of Glasgow, where he was involved with the student television station Glasgow University Student Television. After gaining a Master of Arts degree in English from Glasgow, he worked as a teacher for three and a half years at Cowdenknowes High School, Greenock. In the 1980s he wrote a play entitled War Zones (performed at the 1985 Glasgow Mayfest and the Edinburgh Festival Fringe) and a musical called Knifer.

== Career ==
=== Press Gang ===
Moffat's father Bill was a head teacher at Thorn Primary School in Johnstone, Renfrewshire; when the school was used for Harry Secombe's Highway in the late 1980s, Bill mentioned to the producers that he had an idea for a television series about a school newspaper. The producers asked for a sample script, to which Bill agreed on the condition his son Steven write it. Producer Sandra Hastie said that it was "the best ever first script" that she had read. The resulting series was titled Press Gang, starring Julia Sawalha and Dexter Fletcher, and it ran for five series on ITV between 1989 and 1993, with Moffat writing all forty-three episodes. The programme won a BAFTA award in its second series.

During production of the second series of Press Gang, Moffat was experiencing an unhappy personal life as a result of the break-up of his first marriage. The producer was secretly phoning his friends at home to check on his state. His wife's new lover was represented in the episode "The Big Finish?" by the character Brian Magboy (Simon Schatzberger), a name inspired by Brian: Maggie's boy. Moffat brought in the character so that all sorts of unfortunate things would happen to him, such as having a typewriter dropped on his foot.

=== Joking Apart ===
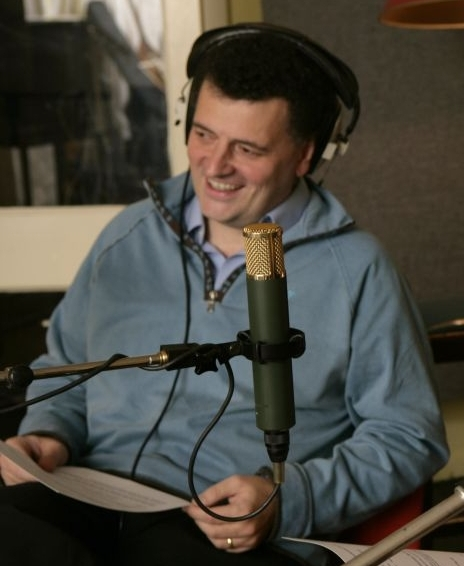
Moffat records the DVD commentary for Joking Apart (2006)

By 1990, Moffat had written two series of Press Gang, but the programme's high cost along with organisational changes at backers Central Independent Television cast its future in doubt. As Moffat wondered what to do next and worried about his future employment, Bob Spiers, Press Gang's primary director, suggested that he meet with producer Andre Ptaszynski to discuss writing a sitcom. Inspired by his experience working in education, Moffat's initial proposal was a programme similar to what became Chalk, a sitcom set in a school that eventually aired in 1997. During the pitch meeting at the Groucho Club, Ptaszynski realised that Moffat was talking passionately about his impending divorce and suggested that he write about that instead of a school sitcom. Taking Ptaszynski's advice, Moffat's new idea was about "a sitcom writer whose wife leaves him". Moffat wrote two series of Joking Apart, which was directed by Spiers and starred Robert Bathurst and Fiona Gillies. The show won the Bronze Rose of Montreux and was entered for the Emmys.

He wrote three episodes of Murder Most Horrid, an anthology series of comedic tales starring Dawn French. The first ("Overkill", directed by Spiers) was identified by the BBC as a "highlight" of the series. His other two episodes were "Dying Live" (dir. Dewi Humphreys) and "Elvis, Jesus and Zack" (dir. Tony Dow).

=== Doctor Who short fiction ===
Moffat has been a fan of Doctor Who since childhood. In 1995, he plotted a segment to Paul Cornell's Virgin New Adventures novel Human Nature. His first solo Doctor Who work was a short story, "Continuity Errors", published in the 1996 Virgin Books anthology Decalog 3: Consequences.

=== Chalk ===
Moffat pitched the series Chalk to Andre Ptaszynski at the beginning of the 1990s. Set in a comprehensive school and starring David Bamber as manic deputy head Eric Slatt and Nicola Walker as Suzy Travis, the show was based on Moffat's three years as an English teacher. The studio audience responded so positively to the first series when it was taped that the BBC commissioned a second series before the first had aired. It was met less enthusiastically by critics upon transmission in February 1997, who had taken exception to the BBC's publicity department comparing the show to the highly respected Fawlty Towers. In an interview in the early 2000s, Moffat refuses to even name the series, joking that he might get attacked in the street.

=== The Curse of Fatal Death ===
In late 1998, Moffat was asked by his wife Sue Vertue, a producer of Comic Relief, to write a comedic sketch based on Doctor Who to be aired across Comic Relief's 1999 telethon in several parts on BBC One. The sketch, The Curse of Fatal Death, was written from December 1998 to February 1999, recorded in February, and broadcast in March.

=== Coupling ===
Moffat's sitcom Coupling, produced by Vertue, was first broadcast on BBC Two in 2000. It ran for four series totalling 28 episodes until 2004, all written by Moffat. He also wrote the original, unbroadcast pilot episode for the U.S. version, also titled Coupling, although this was less successful and was cancelled after four episodes on the NBC network. Moffat blamed its failure on an unprecedented level of network interference.

=== Doctor Who in the Russell T Davies era and Jekyll ===
In December 2003, Moffat received an email offering him to write for Doctor Who, following the announcement of the revival of the series in September. His involvement with the series was announced in March 2004. He wrote six episodes under executive producer Russell T Davies for the 2005 through 2008 series, which were produced from December 2004 to March 2008. Moffat won the Hugo Award for Best Dramatic Presentation, Short Form for the two-part story "The Empty Child" and "The Doctor Dances" (both 2005), as well as the episodes "The Girl in the Fireplace" (2006) and "Blink" (2007). "Blink" also gained him the BAFTA Craft Award for Best Writer, and a BAFTA Cymru Award for Best Screenwriter.

Between Doctor Who episodes, Moffat wrote and produced Jekyll, a modern-day drama series based on the Robert Louis Stevenson novella Strange Case of Dr Jekyll and Mr Hyde, meaning he nearly missed out on writing for the 2007 series of Doctor Who. Written late in the series' run, he quickly based "Blink" on his previously-written Doctor Who short story from 2005, "What I Did on My Christmas Holidays by Sally Sparrow", as "a desperate way to keep a toehold" in the 2007 series. Jekyll aired on BBC One from June 2007.

In March 2008, Davies said that he often rewrote scripts from other writers, but did not "touch a word" of Moffat's episodes.

=== Doctor Who and Sherlock ===
In October 2007, Reuters reported that Moffat would be scripting a trilogy of films based on Belgian artist Hergé's character Tintin for directors Steven Spielberg and Peter Jackson.

In May 2008, the BBC announced that Moffat would be succeeding Davies as lead writer and executive producer of Doctor Who for the show's fifth series, to be broadcast in 2010, although Davies had initiated discussions with Moffat regarding this as far back as July 2007. He had intended to complete work on the Tintin trilogy before resuming work on Doctor Who, but delays caused by the intervening 2007–2008 Writers Guild of America strike meant he could only submit part of a script for the first film. Moffat told The Guardian in 2012 that Spielberg was "lovely" about his decision to walk away from his three-film Tintin contract to return to Doctor Who. The script for the first film in the trilogy, The Adventures of Tintin (released in 2011), was completed by Edgar Wright and Joe Cornish, with a part of Moffat's script used in the film.

During their journeys from London to Cardiff for Doctor Who, Moffat and writer Mark Gatiss conceived a contemporary update of author Sir Arthur Conan Doyle's Sherlock Holmes stories called Sherlock. Vertue advised them to work on the project rather than spend years discussing it. A 60-minute pilot, written by Moffat, was filmed in January 2009. The pilot was not aired but a three-episode series of 90-minute television films produced by Hartswood was commissioned.

Production on Moffat's time in charge of Doctor Who began in July 2009. As executive producer and lead writer, he was significantly involved in casting both Matt Smith as the Eleventh Doctor and Peter Capaldi as the Twelfth Doctor. As Doctor Who showrunner, Moffat won another Hugo Award for Best Dramatic Presentation, Short Form for writing the two-part story "The Pandorica Opens" and "The Big Bang" (both 2010). As showrunner for Sherlock, he won a BAFTA Craft Award for Best Writer for "A Scandal in Belgravia" (2012), a Primetime Emmy Award for Outstanding Writing for a Miniseries, Movie or a Dramatic Special for "His Last Vow" (2014), and a Primetime Emmy Award for Outstanding Television Movie for executive producing "The Abominable Bride" (2016).

In January 2016, Moffat announced he was stepping down as Doctor Who lead writer and executive producer after the 2017 series, his sixth series as showrunner, with Chris Chibnall succeeding him at the start of the eleventh series for broadcast in 2018. The fourth and final series of Sherlock finished production around August 2016, and aired in January 2017. "Twice Upon a Time"—the 2017 Doctor Who Christmas special, and Moffat's last episode as lead writer and showrunner—finished production in July 2017 and broadcast on Christmas that year.

In March 2024, Moffat confirmed his return to writing for Doctor Who's 14th series. He wrote the Christmas special "Joy to the World", also aired in 2024. On the series 14 episode "Boom" and the special he was credited as both writer and as an executive producer.

=== Dracula ===
In October 2018, BBC One and Netflix officially commissioned Dracula, a TV series written and created by Moffat and Gatiss based on Bram Stoker's 1897 novel Dracula. In March 2019, Moffat revealed that the first night of production was about to start. The series began airing New Year's Day 2020, and was broadcast over three consecutive days. The three episodes were released on Netflix on 4 January 2020.

=== The Unfriend ===
On 13 February 2020, Chichester Festival Theatre announced that the play The Unfriend, written by Moffat, was intended to have its world premiere as part of the 2020 Festival Theatre season in the Minerva Theatre. However, due to the COVID-19 pandemic the play's opening night was postponed until 26 May 2022. It was directed by Mark Gatiss and featured Amanda Abbington, Frances Barber, Reece Shearsmith, and Michael Simkins. Following a successful run in Chichester, the play transferred to the Criterion Theatre, London, in January 2023, and thence, with Sarah Alexander as Debbie, and Lee Mack as Peter, to Wyndham's Theatre in January 2024.

=== Later work (2022–present) ===
2022 saw the release of two miniseries by Moffat: HBO's romantic drama The Time Traveler's Wife starring Rose Leslie and Theo James, and BBC One's thriller Inside Man with David Tennant and Stanley Tucci. In 2024, the ITV1 comedy-drama Douglas Is Cancelled was broadcast, which reunited Moffat with Doctor Who actors Karen Gillan and Alex Kingston.

In August 2025, Channel 4 announced it had commissioned the comedy drama Number 10, written by Moffat. The show focuses on the staff at 10 Downing Street, and stars Jenna Coleman from Doctor Who and Katherine Kelly from Doctor Who spin-off Class.

== Personal life ==
Following his first marriage, Moffat said he "shagged [his] way round television studios like a mechanical digger." According to an interview with The New York Times, Moffat met his second wife, television producer Sue Vertue, at the Edinburgh Television Festival in 1996. Vertue had been working for Tiger Aspect, a production company run by Peter Bennett-Jones. Bennett-Jones and his friend and former colleague Andre Ptaszynski, who had worked with Moffat on Joking Apart, told Moffat and Vertue that each fancied the other. A relationship blossomed and they left their respective production companies to join Hartswood Films, run by Beryl Vertue, Sue's mother. The couple have two children together. He is an atheist.

In June 2015, Moffat was appointed an Officer of the Order of the British Empire for his services to drama.

== Production credits ==
=== Television ===
Key
†	Denotes television productions that have not yet been released

Production	Notes	Broadcaster
Press Gang	43 episodes (1989–1993)	ITV
Stay Lucky	"The Devil Wept in Leeds" (1990)	ITV
Joking Apart	13 episodes (1991–1995)	BBC Two
Murder Most Horrid	"Overkill" (1994); "Dying Live" (1996); "Elvis, Jesus and Zack" (1999)	BBC Two
Chalk	12 episodes (1997)	BBC One
Doctor Who	50 episodes, 38 mini-episodes and prequels (Note: Four parts of The Curse of Fatal Death; Two parts of "Space" and Time"; 10 DVD mini-episodes; Three Children in Need mini-episodes; One Doctor Who Prom mini-episode; Two cinema introductions; "The Doctor's Meditation"; "The Night of the Doctor"; "The Last Day"; 11 online prequels/prologues; "Dermot and the Doctor"; "Friend from the Future") (writer, 1999, 2005–2024); Uncredited writing on "The End of Time" Part Two (2010); 84 episodes (executive producer and showrunner, 2010–2017); 2 episodes (executive producer, 2024) (Note: For "Boom" and "Joy to the World")	BBC One (1999, 2005–2017); BBC One/Disney+ (2024) (Note: "Boom" premiered at midnight BST on BBC iPlayer and Disney+ in 2024, before the subsequent evening broadcast on BBC One.)
Coupling	28 episodes (2000–2004)	BBC Two; BBC Three
Jekyll	6 episodes (2007)	BBC One
Sherlock	7 episodes and one mini-episode (writer, 2010–2017); 13 episodes (executive producer and co-creator, 2010–2017)	BBC One
Dracula	Miniseries (co-written with Mark Gatiss, 2020)	BBC One
The Time Traveler's Wife	Miniseries (2022)	HBO
Inside Man	Miniseries (2022)	BBC One/Netflix
Douglas Is Cancelled	Miniseries (2024)	ITVX
Number 10 †	6 episodes (2026)	Channel 4

=== Doctor Who episodes written ===
Doctor Who television credits
Year	Season/Series	Episode	Episode No.	Notes
1999	—N/a	The Curse of Fatal Death	—N/a	Four-part mini-episode. Part of Red Nose Day 1999.
2005	Series 1	"The Empty Child" / "The Doctor Dances"	9–10	
2006	Series 2	"The Girl in the Fireplace"	4	
2007	Series 3	"Blink"	10	
2007	—N/a	"Time Crash"	—N/a	Mini-episode. Part of Children in Need 2007.
2008	Series 4	"Silence in the Library" / "Forest of the Dead"	8–9	
2010	—N/a	"The End of Time" Part Two	—N/a	New Year's Day special. Sometimes known as series 4, episode 18. One uncredited scene by Moffat.
2010	Series 5	"The Eleventh Hour"	1	
2010	Series 5	"The Beast Below"	2	
2010	Series 5	"The Time of Angels" / "Flesh and Stone"	4–5	
2010	Series 5	"The Pandorica Opens" / "The Big Bang"	12–13	
2010	Series 5	"Meanwhile in the TARDIS"	—N/a	Two-part mini-episode created for the fifth series' DVD and Blu-ray
2010	Series 6	"A Christmas Carol"	—N/a	Christmas special
2011	—N/a	"Dermot and the Doctor"	—N/a	Mini-episode, also titled "The Doctor Saves Day" [sic] and "The Doctor and a galaxy of stars". Part of the 12th National Television Awards.
2011	—N/a	"Space" / "Time"	—N/a	Mini-episode. Part of Red Nose Day 2011.
2011	Series 6	"The Impossible Astronaut" / "Day of the Moon"	1–2	Also had a prequel mini-episode on the BBC Doctor Who website
2011	Series 6	"A Good Man Goes to War"	7	Also had a prequel mini-episode on the BBC Doctor Who website
2011	Series 6	"Let's Kill Hitler"	8	Also had a prequel mini-episode on the BBC Doctor Who website
2011	Series 6	"The Wedding of River Song"	13	Also had a prequel mini-episode on the BBC Doctor Who website
2011	—N/a	"The Naked Truth"	—N/a	Mini-episode. Part of Children in Need 2011.
2011	Series 6	Night and the Doctor	—N/a	Series of five mini-episodes called "Bad Night", "Good Night", "First Night", "Last Night", and "Up All Night". Created for the sixth series' DVD and Blu-ray.
2011	Series 7	"The Doctor, the Widow and the Wardrobe"	—N/a	Christmas special. Also had a prequel mini-episode on the BBC Doctor Who website.
2012	Series 7	"Asylum of the Daleks"	1	Also had a prequel mini-episode initially released on iTunes
2012	Series 7	"The Angels Take Manhattan"	5	
2012	Series 7	"The Great Detective"	—N/a	Prequel mini-episode to "The Snowmen". Part of Children in Need 2012.
2012	Series 7	"The Snowmen"	—N/a	Christmas special. Also had two online prequel mini-episodes, one on iTunes in 2013 and one on the BBC website in 2012. Sometimes known as series 7, episode 6.
2013	Series 7	"The Bells of Saint John"	6	Also had a prequel mini-episode on the BBC website. Sometimes known as series 7, episode 7.
2013	Series 7	"The Name of the Doctor"	13	Also had a prequel mini-episode available on BBC Red Button. Sometimes known as series 7, episode 14.
2013	Series 7	"Clarence and the Whispermen"	—N/a	Mini-episode produced for the Series 7 Part Two DVD and Blu-ray
2013	—N/a	"Body Swap"	—N/a	Mini-episode. Part of the 2013 Doctor Who Prom.
2013	Series 7	"Clara and the TARDIS"	—N/a	Mini-episode created for the complete seventh series DVD and Blu-ray
2013	Series 7	"The Inforarium"	—N/a	Mini-episode created for the complete seventh series DVD and Blu-ray
2013	—N/a	"The Night of the Doctor"	—N/a	BBC iPlayer/YouTube mini-episode
2013	—N/a	"The Last Day"	—N/a	Online mini-episode
2013	—N/a	"The Day of the Doctor"	—N/a	50th anniversary special. Also wrote a special introduction for cinema screenings of the episode.
2013	—N/a	"The Time of the Doctor"	—N/a	Christmas special
2014	Series 8	"Deep Breath"	1	Also wrote a special introduction for cinema screenings of the episode
2014	Series 8	"Into the Dalek"	2	With Phil Ford
2014	Series 8	"Listen"	4	
2014	Series 8	"Time Heist"	5	With Steve Thompson
2014	Series 8	"The Caretaker"	6	With Gareth Roberts
2014	Series 8	"Dark Water" / "Death in Heaven"	11–12	
2014	Series 9	"Last Christmas"	—N/a	Christmas special
2015	Series 9	"The Doctor's Meditation"	—N/a	Mini-episode and prequel to "The Magician's Apprentice". Shown during cinema screenings of "Dark Water" / "Death in Heaven".
2015	Series 9	"The Magician's Apprentice" / "The Witch's Familiar"	1–2	Also had an online prologue
2015	Series 9	"The Girl Who Died"	5	With Jamie Mathieson
2015	Series 9	"The Zygon Inversion"	8	With Peter Harness
2015	Series 9	"Heaven Sent"	11	
2015	Series 9	"Hell Bent"	12	
2015	Series 9	"The Husbands of River Song"	—N/a	Christmas special
2016	Series 10	"Friend from the Future"	—N/a	Mini-episode, also titled "Introducing the New Companion..." Repurposed into part of "The Pilot"
2016	Series 10	"The Return of Doctor Mysterio"	—N/a	Christmas special
2017	Series 10	"The Pilot"	1	
2017	Series 10	"Extremis"	6	
2017	Series 10	"The Pyramid at the End of the World"	7	With Peter Harness
2017	Series 10	"World Enough and Time" / "The Doctor Falls"	11–12	
2017	Series 10	"Twice Upon a Time"	—N/a	Christmas special
2024	Series 14 (Note: Also known as season 1)	"Boom"	3	
2024	Series 15 (Note: Also known as season 2)	"Joy to the World"	—N/a	Christmas special

=== Sherlock episodes written ===
Sherlock television credits
Year	Season/Series	Episode	Episode No.	Notes
2009	—N/a	"A Study in Pink"	—N/a	Unaired pilot
2010	Series 1	"A Study in Pink"	1	
2012	Series 2	"A Scandal in Belgravia"	1	
2013	Series 3	"Many Happy Returns"	—N/a	Online mini-episode and a prequel to series 3. With Mark Gatiss.
2014	Series 3	"The Sign of Three"	2	With Steve Thompson and Mark Gatiss
2014	Series 3	"His Last Vow"	3	
2016	—N/a	"The Abominable Bride"	—N/a	New Year's Day special. With Mark Gatiss.
2017	Series 4	"The Lying Detective"	2	
2017	Series 4	"The Final Problem"	3	With Mark Gatiss

=== Film ===
Production	Notes	Distributor
The Adventures of Tintin: The Secret of the Unicorn	Feature film (co-written with Edgar Wright and Joe Cornish, 2011)	Paramount Pictures (North America/UK/Australia); Sony Pictures Releasing (International)

=== Stage ===
Production	Notes	Theatre
The Unfriend	World premiere (2022); First West End run (2023); Second West End run (2024)	Minerva Theatre, Chichester; Criterion Theatre, London; Wyndham's Theatre, London

== Awards and nominations ==
Year	Award	Work	Category	Result	Reference
1991	British Academy Television Awards	Press Gang	Best Children's Programme (Entertainment / Drama)	Won	
1991	Royal Television Society Awards	Press Gang	Best Children's Programme	Won	
1992	British Academy Television Awards	Press Gang	Best Children's Programme	Nominated	
1995	Bronze Rose of Montreux	Joking Apart	Comedy	Won	
2003	British Comedy Awards	Coupling	Best TV Comedy	Won	
2006	Hugo Award	Doctor Who: "The Empty Child"/"The Doctor Dances"	Best Dramatic Presentation, Short Form	Won	
2007	Hugo Award	Doctor Who: "The Girl in the Fireplace"	Best Dramatic Presentation, Short Form	Won	
2007	Nebula Award	Doctor Who: "The Girl in the Fireplace"	Best Script	Nominated	
2007	Writers' Guild of Great Britain Award	Doctor Who, Series Three	Best Soap / Series (TV) (with Chris Chibnall, Paul Cornell, Russell T Davies, Helen Raynor and Gareth Roberts)	Won	
2008	Nebula Award	Doctor Who: "Blink"	Best Script	Nominated	
2008	British Academy Television Award	Doctor Who: "Blink"	Best Writer	Won	
2008	Hugo Award	Doctor Who: "Blink"	Best Dramatic Presentation, Short Form	Won	
2008	BAFTA Cymru	Doctor Who: "Blink"	Best Screenwriter	Won	
2008	BAFTA Scotland	Doctor Who	Writing in Film or Television	Nominated	
2008	SFX Awards	Doctor Who: "Silence in the Library"/"Forest of the Dead"	Best TV Episode	Nominated	
2009	Hugo Award	Doctor Who: "Silence in the Library"/"Forest of the Dead"	Best Dramatic Presentation, Short Form	Nominated	
2009	Writers' Guild of Great Britain Award	Doctor Who, Series Four	Television drama series (with Russell T Davies)	Nominated	
2010	SFX Awards	Doctor Who (for taking over as showrunner)	Hope for the Future	Won	
2011	Hugo Award	Doctor Who: "The Pandorica Opens"/"The Big Bang"	Best Dramatic Presentation, Short Form	Won	
2011	Hugo Award	Doctor Who: "A Christmas Carol"	Best Dramatic Presentation, Short Form	Nominated	
2011	Primetime Emmy Award	Sherlock: "A Study in Pink"	Outstanding Writing for a Miniseries, Movie or a Dramatic Special	Nominated	
2011	Satellite Award	The Adventures of Tintin: The Secret of the Unicorn (shared with Edgar Wright and Joe Cornish)	Best Adapted Screenplay	Nominated	
2012	Annie Award	The Adventures of Tintin: The Secret of the Unicorn (shared with Edgar Wright and Joe Cornish)	Writing in a Feature Production	Nominated	
2012	Hugo Award	Doctor Who: "A Good Man Goes To War"	Best Dramatic Presentation, Short Form	Nominated	
2012	British Academy Television Craft Awards	—N/a	Special Award	Won	
2012	British Academy Television Craft Awards	Sherlock: "A Scandal in Belgravia"	Best Writing	Won	
2012	Primetime Emmy Award	Sherlock: "A Scandal in Belgravia"	Outstanding Writing for a Miniseries, Movie or a Dramatic Special	Nominated	
2013	Hugo Award	Doctor Who: "Asylum of the Daleks"	Best Dramatic Presentation, Short Form	Nominated	
2013	Hugo Award	Doctor Who: "The Angels Take Manhattan"	Best Dramatic Presentation, Short Form	Nominated	
2013	Hugo Award	Doctor Who: "The Snowmen"	Best Dramatic Presentation, Short Form	Nominated	
2014	Hugo Award	Doctor Who: "The Name of the Doctor"	Best Dramatic Presentation, Short Form	Nominated	
2014	Hugo Award	Doctor Who: "The Day of the Doctor"	Best Dramatic Presentation, Short Form	Nominated	
2014	Nebula Awards	Doctor Who: "The Day of the Doctor"	Ray Bradbury Award for Outstanding Dramatic Presentation	Nominated	
2014	Primetime Emmy Award	Sherlock: "His Last Vow"	Outstanding Writing for a Miniseries, Movie or a Dramatic Special	Won	
2015	Bram Stoker Award	Doctor Who: "Listen"	Superior Achievement in a Screenplay	Nominated	
2015	Hugo Award	Doctor Who: "Listen"	Best Dramatic Presentation, Short Form	Nominated	
2015	BAFTA Scotland	Doctor Who	Writer in Film or Television	Nominated	
2016	Hugo Award	Doctor Who: "Heaven Sent"	Best Dramatic Presentation, Short Form	Nominated	
2016	Primetime Emmy Award	Sherlock: "The Abominable Bride"	Outstanding Television Movie	Won	
2017	Hugo Award	Doctor Who: "The Return of Doctor Mysterio"	Best Dramatic Presentation, Short Form	Nominated	
2018	Hugo Award	Doctor Who: "Twice Upon a Time"	Best Dramatic Presentation, Short Form	Nominated	

== Novels ==
- Moffat, Steven (2018). Doctor Who: The Day of the Doctor. Random House UK. ISBN 978-1-78594-329-4.

== See also ==
- Category:Works by Steven Moffat
