= Fiona Gillies =

British actress (born 1966)

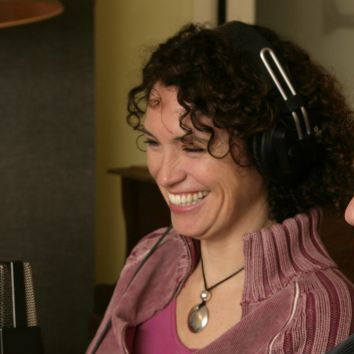
- Gillies in 2006
- Born: 19 June 1966 (age 59); London, England
- Notable work: Becky Johnson/Taylor in Joking Apart; Clare Shearer in Peak Practice
- Spouse: Michael Müller
- Website: www.gilliesworks.com

Fiona Gillies (born 19 June 1966) is a British actress who has appeared in feature films, on television and the stage.

== Television ==
She first appeared in the 1988 version of The Hound of the Baskervilles as Beryl Stapleton. A year later she appeared in the mini-series Mother Love.

Gillies first major television role was perhaps Steven Moffat's sitcom Joking Apart, where she played Becky. She has also appeared as Bunty Morrell in "A Perfect Hero", as Clare Shearer in Peak Practice, as Philippa Kinross in Casualty, and in The Jury. She played Lady Florence Craye in the third series of Jeeves and Wooster.

Gillies has had many guest roles, including appearances in Cadfael, Powers, A Bit of Fry & Laurie, Holby City, PhoneShop, Waking the Dead and Coronation Street. In February 2022, she played the role of Abigail Swann in an episode of the BBC soap opera Doctors.

== Stage ==
Gillies has also performed for the RSC in A Midsummer Night's Dream, Beaux' Stratagem, The Comedy of Errors and Hamlet. She appeared in the West End productions of The Prisoner of Second Avenue with Jeff Goldblum and Mercedes Ruehl as well as Trevor Nunn's production of Rosencrantz and Guildenstern Are Dead.

== Film ==
In 2011, Gillies co-produced the feature film City Slacker, written by her husband, Michael Müller. In the film, Gillies plays Amanda, a high-powered businesswoman who suddenly needs to conceive a baby when her frozen eggs are destroyed.

Gillies also produced The Beat Beneath My Feet, about a has-been rock star, played by Luke Perry, who is discovered living in a flat in South London. Production was completed in 2014.

Gillies produced Some Sweet Oblivious Antidote, a short film starring Lenny Henry, Colin Salmon, Wunmi Mosaku and Sylvestra Le Touzel. The film was nominated for Best Family Film at the Sydney Indie Film Festival.

== Other activities ==
In 2020 Fiona Gillies co-founded SMASH the Rights and IP Marketplace, with fellow producer Christine Hartland and digital pioneer Mahesh Ramachandra to encourage new, diverse talent to engage with decision makers.
