= Bob Spiers =

Scottish film and television director (1945–2008)

- Born: Robert Alexander Spiers; 27 September 1945; Glasgow, Scotland, UK
- Died: 8 December 2008 (aged 63); Devon, England, UK
- Occupations: Television director and producer
- Notable work: Fawlty Towers; Press Gang; Absolutely Fabulous; Spice World

Robert Alexander Spiers (27 September 1945 – 8 December 2008) was a Scottish television director and producer. He worked on many sitcoms, including Dad's Army and Are You Being Served?, and won two British Academy Television Awards for Fawlty Towers and Absolutely Fabulous. Spiers also directed the films That Darn Cat and Spice World (both 1997), and Kevin of the North (2001).

== Life and career ==
Born in Glasgow, Scotland, he attended Southgate College in the 1960s. "Jock", as he was affectionately known at the time, organised several student trips from the college to mainland Europe, including Brussels and Cologne, during this period. He was also already an accomplished tennis player, having achieved a very high national standard during the time he lived in Scotland.

Spiers joined the staff of the BBC in 1970, working as an assistant floor manager and later a production assistant, before eventually working his way up to become a director and producer. As a director he worked on several high-profile programmes, such as Dad's Army, Are You Being Served? (also producing) and It Ain't Half Hot Mum, all sitcoms, a genre with which he became particularly associated. During the 1970s he met his wife, Annie.

It was because of his talent for directing comedy that he was chosen to handle the second series of Fawlty Towers in 1979, which already had an enormous reputation on the basis of its initial six episodes in 1975, and it won him his first BAFTA award. Spiers subsequently provided a commentary for all the episodes he directed of Fawlty Towers when the series was released on DVD. Shortly after he directed the series and the unbroadcast pilot of Not the Nine O'Clock News, Spiers left the staff of the BBC to work as a freelance director.

Throughout the 1980s, he worked on a number of programmes, of particular note being Channel 4's anthology comedy series The Comic Strip Presents... and the BBC sketch shows French and Saunders and A Bit of Fry and Laurie. He began his association with writer Steven Moffat in 1989, directing over half of the episodes of the teen comedy drama series Press Gang (1989–1993) for the ITV network. According to Moffat, Spiers was the "principal director" taking an interest in the other episodes and setting the visual style of the show. Spiers particularly used tracking shots, sometimes requiring more dialogue to be written to accommodate the length of the shot. The other directors would come in and "do a Spiers". Spiers then directed all twelve episodes of Moffat's sitcom Joking Apart (1993, 1995). The show won the Bronze Rose of Montreux and was entered for the Emmys.

His association with comedians Dawn French and Jennifer Saunders from directing their sketch show led to him working on individual projects from each of them during the 1990s. With French he worked on the macabre comedy anthology series Murder Most Horrid, with some episodes written by Moffat (such as "Overkill"). He helmed Saunders' Absolutely Fabulous throughout the decade, the show having originated in a sketch from an episode of French and Saunders which had also been directed by Spiers. Absolutely Fabulous won Spiers his second BAFTA award.

Spiers directed the pop group the Spice Girls in their film Spiceworld (1997). He had been working in America on the Disney film That Darn Cat at the peak of the Spice Girls' popularity, and was unaware of the group when first offered the job of directing Spiceworld until friend Jennifer Saunders advised that he take it. He arrived at a meeting with them in a New York hotel unaware of what they looked like. He also directed two episodes of the Australian ABC series The Adventures of Lano and Woodley.

He died of cancer on 8 December 2008 in Widecombe, Devon at a family home after a long illness.

== Filmography ==
=== Television ===
Title	Year(s)	Notes
Dad's Army	1974, 1977	Production assistant on season 7, directed 1 episode ("The Miser's Hoard")
It Ain't Half Hot Mum	1975, 1976	Production assistant on season 2, directed 6 episodes
Come Back Mrs. Noah	1977–1978	6 episodes
Are You Being Served?	1977–1983	UK version, 13 episodes, also producer
Sykes	1978	1 episode ("Television Film")
Christmas Snowtime Special	1978	Assistant producer
Seaside Special	1978	Assistant producer on season 4
Snowtime Special	1978	Assistant producer on 2 episodes
Fawlty Towers	1979	Season 2
Not the Nine O'Clock News	1979	Unaired pilot only
The Goodies	1977–82	10 episodes
Are You Being Served?	1980–1981	Australian version, also producer
Both Ends Meet	1981	
The Comic Strip Presents...	1982–1988	8 episodes, also played the Vicar in "Queen of the Wild Frontier"
A Cut Above	1982	Pilot; director and producer
Little Armadillos	1984	
What a Way to Run a Revolution	1986	TV movie
Up Line	1987	TV movie
Familie Oudenrijn	1987	
French and Saunders	1988–1995	18 episodes
Press Gang	1989–1993	
Tygo Road	1990	
Lazarus and Dingwall	1991	
Murder Most Horrid	1991–1994	
Joking Apart	1993–1995	
Absolutely Fabulous	1992–1995, 2001	All episodes of seasons 1-3, and three of season 4
Bottom	1995	Season 3
A Bit of Fry and Laurie	1995	Season 4
Agony Again	1995	All episodes
The Adventures of Lano and Woodley	1997	2 episodes ("The Girlfriend", "Starquest")
The Ruby Wax Show	1997	
Days Like These	1999	
Privates	1999	Pilot
A Tribute to the Likely Lads	2002	TV short

=== Film ===
Title	Year	Notes
That Darn Cat	1997	
Spice World	1997	
Kevin of the North	2001	Also known as Chilly Dogs
