= Richard Pearson (actor) =

English character actor (1918–2011)

- Photo by Freddie Feest
- Born: Richard de Pearsall Pearson; 1 August 1918; Monmouth
- Died: 2 August 2011 (aged 93); Northwood, London, England
- Occupation: Actor
- Years active: 1937–2009
- Spouse: Patricia Dickson (m. 1949)
- Children: 2

Richard de Pearsall Pearson (1 August 1918 – 2 August 2011) was a British character actor who appeared in numerous film, television and stage productions over a period of 65 years. He played leading roles in several London West End plays and also supported Maggie Smith, Robert Morley and others in long-running West End stage productions. His many screen appearances included character parts in three Roman Polanski films.

== Biography ==
Richard Pearson was born and brought up in Monmouth. He was educated at Aymestrey Court, Worcester, and at Monmouth School, where his father, Cyril Pearson (1888–1946), taught French.

Richard Pearson's early stage career was interrupted by military service in the Second World War with the 52nd (Lowland) Infantry Division. He was mentioned in dispatches and left the army with the rank of lieutenant-colonel.

He married the actress Patricia Dickson (1927–2014) in 1949. They lived until the late 1950s in Nassau Street, in the Fitzrovia district of London, then in Beckenham, and latterly in Richmond upon Thames. They had two sons, Simon and Patrick; Patrick is also an actor.

In the later years of his life, Pearson suffered from myocardial degeneration. He died on 2 August 2011, the morning after his 93rd birthday.

== Film and television ==
Notable films of his career included Brian Desmond Hurst's Scrooge (1951) as well as a brief appearance in John Schlesinger's Sunday Bloody Sunday (1971) and cameo roles in three films by Roman Polanski: Macbeth (1971), Tess (1979) and Pirates (1986). Pearson did not make his film début until the age of 32, when he played a sergeant in the motion picture The Girl is Mine (1950). This was followed a year later by his performance as Mr Tupper in Scrooge.

In later years, Pearson is perhaps best known for his role as Mole in Cosgrove Hall's The Wind in the Willows (1983), its subsequent television series, which led on from the original film, and its spin-off programme Oh, Mr. Toad, in all of which he starred alongside David Jason, Peter Sallis and Michael Hordern. He also appeared in episodes of "A Fine Romance, and "One Foot in the Grave" as Victor Meldrew's absent-minded brother, Alfred, in the "Men Behaving Badly" episode "Three Girlfriends", as Gary's father Mr Strang, and as Harry King in "My Good Friend", alongside George Cole and Minnie Driver. He played Mr. Pye in the 1985 TV movie Marple: The Moving Finger.

== Selected filmography ==
=== Films ===
Year	Title	Role	Notes
1950	The Girl Is Mine	Sergeant	
1950	The Woman with No Name	Tony	
1950	The Woman in Question	Detective	
1950	The Clouded Yellow	Det Sgt Stewart	(uncredited)
1951	Scrooge	Mr. Tupper	
1953	The Blue Parrot	Quinney	
1954	Dangerous Cargo	Noel Butler	
1954	Svengali	Lambert	
1958	Battle of the V-1	Senior RAF Officer	
1958	Sea Fury	Kershaw	
1958	Model for Murder	Bullock	
1959	The Crowning Touch	Roger	
1959	Life in Danger	Sgt. Norris	
1959	Libel	The Butler	
1960	Man in the Moon	Doctor No. 1	
1961	Attempt to Kill	Frank Weyman	
1962	Guns of Darkness	Bastian	
1963	The King's Breakfast	Violinist	
1964	The Comedy Man	Advertising Man	(uncredited)
1964	The Yellow Rolls-Royce	Osborn	
1966	The Caramel Crisis	Cloon	
1967	Charlie Bubbles	Accountant	
1967	How I Won the War	Old Man at Alamein	
1968	Inspector Clouseau	Shockley	
1968	The Strange Affair	Constable	
1970	The Rise and Rise of Michael Rimmer	Wilting	
1971	Sunday Bloody Sunday	Patient	
1971	To Catch a Spy	Haldane	
1971	Macbeth	Doctor	
1972	Pope Joan	Friar Timothy	
1975	One of Our Dinosaurs Is Missing	Sir Geoffrey	
1975	Royal Flash	Duchy Chamberlain	
1976	The Blue Bird	Bread	
1976	It Shouldn't Happen to a Vet	Granville	
1979	Tess	Vicar of Marlott	
1980	The Mirror Crack'd	Doctor Haydock	
1983	The Wind in the Willows	Mole (voice)	TV Movie
1985	Water	Foreign Secretary	
1986	Pirates	Padre	
1986	Whoops Apocalypse	Michael Sumpter (Defence Secretary)	
1989	A Tale of Two Toads	Mole (voice)	TV Movie

=== Television ===
Year	Title	Role	Notes
1954 - 1955	Fabian of the Yard	Sergeant Mackenzie	TBC
1956	The Adventures of the Scarlet Pimpernel	Jack Williams	Episode: "Gentlemen of the Road"
1958 - 1959	Our Mutual Friend	Nicodemus Boffin	9 episodes
1959	Bleak House	Mr. Inspector Bucket	6 episodes
1960	Danger Man	Keith Smith	Episode: "The Dead Man Walks"
1964	Martin Chuzzelwit	Pecksniff	13 episodes
1964	Armchair Mystery Theatre	Karl Heffer	Episode: "The Last Coach"
1965	No Hiding Place	Billy Nolan	Episode: "The Grass"
1965	Z-Cars	Robertson	Episode: "Routine Enquiries"
1966	Softly, Softly	Gough	2 episodes
1966	Sergeant Cork	Sam Hawkesworth	Episode: "The Case of the Fallen Family"
1967	The Forsyte Saga	Foskinsson	2 episodes
1967	Z-Cars	Mr. Davis	Episode: "All in a Day's Work" (2 parts)
1968	Sherlock Holmes	Inspector Bayens	Episode: "Wisteria Lodge"
1968	Middlemarch	Mr. Bulstrode	6 episodes
1968	The Root of All Evil?	Arnold Butters	Episode: "Of Course We Trust You Arnold"
1969	The Troubleshooters	Augustus Walker	Episode: "Don't Ask, Take"
1969	Out of the Unknown	Mr. Foster	Episode: "The Fosters"
1969	The First Churchills	Robert Harley	4 episodes
1971	Hadleigh	Mortlake	Episode: "A Letter to David"
1972	Columbo	Dr. Diver ((Police Pathologist)	Episode: "Dagger of the Mind"
1973	Softly, Softly: Task Force	Heston	Episode: "Little Acorns"
1973	The Rivals of Sherlock Holmes	Marquess of Macclesfield	Episode: "The Secret of the Foxhunter"
1973	The Upper Crusts	Balforth	2 episodes
1974	Village Hall	Woodcock	Episode: "The Magic Sponge"
1975	Public Eye	Jenks	Episode: "Take No for an Answer"
1977	Just William	Mr. Balater	Episode: "William and the Prize Pig"
1977	Crown Court	Francis Galway	Episode: "A Sheep in Wolf's Clothing" (2 parts)
1977	The Duchess of Duke Street	Sir Ernest Horsfield	Episode: "Shadows"
1980	Enemy at the Door	William Clifford	Episode: "Jealousy"
1980	God's Wonderful Railway	Mr. Jellicoe	3 episodes
1980	Hammer House of Horror	Sir Humphrey Chesterton	Episode: "The Thirteenth Reunion"
1983	Tales of the Unexpected	Michael Carey	Episode: "Clinical Error"
1983	Chessgame	Handworth-Jones	2 episodes
1983 - 1984	A Fine Romance	Mr. Dalton	3 episodes
1984 - 1990	The Wind in the Willows	Mole (voice)	65 episodes
1985	Miss Marple	Mr. Pye	2 episodes
1990	Campion	Dr. Galley	Episode: "Sweet Danger" (2 parts)
1990	Freddie and Max	Malcolm Parkes	5 episodes
1991	Inspector Morse	Jerome Hugg	Episode: "Greeks Bearing Gifts"
1992	One Foot in the Grave	Alfred Meldrew	Episode: "The Broken Reflection"
1992 - 1994	Love Hurts	Dr. Piggott	6 episodes
1995	Men Behaving Badly	Mr. Strang	Episode: "Three Girlfriends"
1995 - 1996	My Good Friend	Harry King	13 episodes

== Stage ==
"Pearson was the kind of actor on which the British theatre has always relied: utterly dependable and totally distinctive. His particular forte, with his slightly fluting voice, was for revealing the chink in the armour of middle-class respectability." He made his stage debut at the age of 18 at London's Collins's Music Hall. Though well known as a character actor, his leading roles in London theatres included Stanley in Harold Pinter's The Birthday Party (Lyric, Hammersmith, 1958), Charles Sidley in Peter Shaffer's The Public Eye (Globe, 1962), Harry in Charles Dyer's Staircase (Arts, Cambridge, 1969), and Mr Hardcastle in Oliver Goldsmith's She Stoops to Conquer (Young Vic, 1972).

With The Birthday Party, after a short, successful provincial tour, "the play was critically slaughtered when it opened at the Lyric Hammersmith in London in May 1958." Critics were baffled "and it was withdrawn after only a few performances – only one critic" (Harold Hobson) "had given it an unqualified welcome. But Pearson's portrait of the lodger fixed itself longest in the critical memory for its study of unexplained but deeply felt terror."

Among those he played beside on stage were Margaret Rutherford, Robert Morley, Maggie Smith, Kenneth Williams, Eileen Atkins and Margaret Tyzack.

=== Selected London appearances ===
- Macadam and Eve by Roger MacDougall (1950)
- The Mortimer Touch by Eric Linklater (1952)
- Both Ends Meet by Arthur Macrae (1954, also in the BBC television adaptation of 1962)
- A Likely Tale by Gerald Savory (1956, with Margaret Rutherford and Robert Morley)
- The Iron Duchess by William Douglas Home (1957)
- The Birthday Party by Harold Pinter (1958, creating the role of Stanley, also in the 1960 ITV production)
- The Private Ear and the Public Eye by Peter Shaffer (1962, with Maggie Smith and Kenneth Williams)
- Tiny Alice by Edward Albee at the Aldwych Theatre in 1970
- Vivat! Vivat Regina! by Robert Bolt (1970, Chichester and London, with Sarah Miles and Eileen Atkins)
- Arms and the Man by George Bernard Shaw (1981)
- Lettice and Lovage by Peter Shaffer (1987, as Mr Bardolph, with Maggie Smith and Margaret Tyzack)
- The Importance of Being Earnest by Oscar Wilde (1993, as Dr Chasuble with Maggie Smith as Lady Bracknell)
