= The Wind in the Willows (TV series) =

British stop-motion animated television series (1984–1990)

- Also known as: Oh, Mr. Toad (series 5)
- Genre: Stop-motion; Family; Comedy
- Created by: Cosgrove Hall
- Written by: Kenneth Grahame; Rosemary Anne Sisson; Brian Trueman
- Directed by: Mark Hall; Chris Taylor; Jackie Cockle
- Starring: David Jason; Richard Pearson; Peter Sallis; Michael Hordern; Daphne Oxenford; Brian Trueman; Delia Corrie; Brian Southwood; Kate Lee; Peter Wheeler; Jimmy Hibbert
- Narrated by: Ian Carmichael
- Theme music composer: Keith Hopwood; Malcolm Rowe
- Country of origin: United Kingdom
- Original language: English
- No. of series: 4; 1 (Oh, Mr. Toad)
- No. of episodes: 52; 13 (Oh, Mr. Toad)

Production
- Producers: Brian Cosgrove; Mark Hall; John Hambley; Chris Taylor
- Editor: John McManus
- Running time: 20 minutes
- Production companies: Cosgrove Hall Productions; Thames Television

Original release
- Network: ITV
- Release: 1 October 1984 – 19 June 1990

Related
- The Wind in the Willows (1983); A Tale of Two Toads (1989)

The Wind in the Willows is a British stop motion animated television series that was originally broadcast between 1984 and 1987, based on characters from Kenneth Grahame's 1908 novel The Wind in the Willows and following the 1983 feature-length pilot film.

The series continues from where the film left off, and original voice cast members David Jason, Richard Pearson and Michael Hordern return. However, Ian Carmichael, who had previously voiced Rat in the film, has now been cast as the narrator, and Rat is now played by Peter Sallis.

The series was made by Manchester-based animation company Cosgrove Hall for Thames Television and shown on the ITV network. An hour-long feature, A Tale of Two Toads, was broadcast in 1989. It ran for five series, with the final series airing in 1990 under the title Oh, Mr. Toad, with a different theme song. In some countries, the original title is retained in the fifth series, and all series were packaged together as The Wind in the Willows on DVD. In August 2022, the first three series, as well as the first TV film, were added to streaming service Britbox in the United Kingdom.

== Cast and characters ==
Main characters

- Toad (David Jason) – The wealthy owner of Toad Hall, the finest home in the county. Though arrogant, selfish, and ignorant, he is nonetheless charismatic, good-humoured, and cares for his friends dearly. He always throws himself into all kinds of new crazes, without much consideration. His main catchphrase is "It's the only thing!" He often gets himself in trouble, resulting in his friends saving him. Many episodes conclude with his friends chorusing "Oh, Toad!" in despair at his constant qualms and ineptitude. Toad is also accident-prone which is evident in certain episodes such as in "Mercury of the Motorbicycle", where he crashes his motor car at the start and his newly acquired motorcycle at the end.
- Mole (Richard Pearson) – Shy, gentle and honest, Mole lives in a modest home underground called Mole End. He tends to be more indulgent of Toad's bragging and ever-changing interests.
- Rat (Peter Sallis) – Dear friend to Mole. A friendly and strait-laced everyman with a love of poetry and music, and a great passion for the river by which he lives. He and Mole live at each other's homes for extended periods during the series.
- Badger (Michael Hordern) – The father figure of the group. Respected by all for his intelligence and courage. He was a friend of Toad's late father and enjoys chess and canvas painting. Serious-minded and mature, but with a strong sense of justice, he always tries to keep Toad out of trouble. He is shown to play the violin in the episode "A Producer's Lot"
- Chief Weasel (David Jason) – The villainous leader of the Weasels, the bullies and thieves of the Wild Wood. He often tries to trick Toad out of his wealth. However, he is not all bad, and at times will selflessly come to the aid of other animals in need – examples including Mole in "Badger's Remedy"; Otter's son Portly in "The Piper At The Gates Of Dawn" and a lost shrew, Ernest, in "The Rescue". In two episodes, his name is revealed to be Bill.
- Henchman Weasel (Brian Trueman) – the Chief's somewhat dim-witted second-in-command; known for his catchphrase, "Very nice; very nice!". Despite the Chief's abusive nature towards him, he remains loyal to his boss. In "The Rescue", his name is revealed to be Bert.

Recurring characters

- Otter (Brian Southwood) – One of the inhabitants of the River Bank and an old friend of Rat.
- Portly (Brian Southwood) – Otter's son.
- Billy Rabbit (David Jason) – "Billy" is present in all series. He first appears as an unnamed character the Series 1 episode "The Grand Annual Show", but becomes more of a recurring character from Series 3 onwards. He is not to be confused with Billy the Fieldmouse, who appears on and off in the series. Both appear together in a number of episodes.
- Alfred (Allan Bardsley) – Toad's sarcastic and stubborn but well-meaning horse who always refuses to do what Toad wants to do. He briefly appeared in the film with a singing role and then made on and off appearances in the series. His catchphrases are "Nope" and "Ar".
- Auberon Mole (Howard Lloyd Lewis) – Mole's cousin. In the series, is a well-known playwright, and the focus of the episodes "Mole's Cousin", "Auberon's Return" and "Happy New Year".
- Mrs. Carrington-Moss (Beryl Reid) – The magistrate in the film. She appears in the episodes, "The Grand Annual Show", "Buried Treasure", and "Burglary at Toad Hall".
- Reggie and Rosemary – The owners of the stolen motor car in the film. They appear in the episodes, "The Grand Annual Show", and "Burglary at Toad Hall".
- Thomas (Jimmy Hibbert) – Auberon's chauffeur and personal assistant, who is also a toad. He appears in the episodes "Mole's Cousin" and "Happy New Year".

== Background ==
The series is sometimes misidentified as being filmed in claymation. The method used by Cosgrove Hall is a stop-motion animation process using scale model sets and posable character figurines. The figurines are composed of an articulate metal skeleton (armature) covered in latex rubber, providing the flexibility and the detail which distinguishes the series.

The series is set at The Riverbank, a mythical location somewhere in Berkshire, south west England. The Riverbank is where Ratty, Mole and Toad live. Nearby is the Wild Wood, where Badger and the Weasels live. Each episode has a unique story line, although there are some common themes running throughout the series. In series 4, the humans start building a new railway that is planned to be built through the area where the animals live. The railway gets closer and closer to the animals' homes, yet in the episode "Happy New Year" it turns out that the railway would be travelling over unsuitable land, and therefore the route is diverted from the Riverbank and Wild Wood areas.

== Music ==
The popular theme song is based on the instrumental theme to the original film, which had been composed by Keith Hopwood and Malcolm Rowe, and arranged by Brian Ibbetson. For the series, the song was adapted by the same composers and arranger and was sung by British singer-songwriter Ralph McTell. The Stone Roses guitarist John Squire also worked on this series, but as a prop maker, not a musician.

== Episodes ==
=== Series 1 (1984) ===
| No. | Title | Original release date | Prod. code |
|---|---|---|---|
| 1 | "The Further Adventures of Toad" | 1 October 1984 | 101 |
After overthrowing the Weasels in the battle of Toad Hall, Toad hosts a celebration dinner for his friends. He reminisces about his time in prison, escape from jail and his exploits with the barge woman. His friends are less than impressed with how he handled some of the situations, but Toad gets offended when they tell him so.
| 2 | "The Kidnapping of Toad" | 8 October 1984 | 102 |
Invited to the weasels' den for a 'literary evening', Toad is taken prisoner, and is hazed by the weasels. Badger has no intention of paying for his return and instead opts to attack the weasels with Mole and Ratty, but Toad's incessant chatter drives the weasels to distraction, so they play a final trick on him before letting him go free.
| 3 | "The Ghost at Mole End" | 15 October 1984 | 103 |
While resting, Mole hears sounds which he cannot account for. It leads him to fear that there might be a ghost in his house. Mole seeks reassurance from Badger that the sounds could be the noises of growing tree roots, etc., but Toad exacerbates the issue by singing to Mole about the thousands of ghosts skulking in Toad Hall. Eventually, though, he discovers that the sounds are produced by a hedgehog which has fallen into a crevice immediately above his burrow. With the help of Rat, he saves the animal.
| 4 | "The Great Steamer" | 22 October 1984 | 104 |
After Rat's house is shaken by the passing of a great steamer, he and Mole hear the calls of the riverbank youngsters, who have lost their friend Billy (a fieldmouse – not Billy Rabbit) in the commotion. A desperate search for ensues, and he is found clinging perilously close to the weir. Rat and Mole stage a brave rescue, and bring the youngsters back to the house to dry off and have a hot drink. Rat admonishes the youngsters for playing dangerously on the river, before entertaining them with a rendition of his song, "We'll Go Boating". Badger and Toad do not appear in this episode.
| 5 | "Buried Treasure" | 29 October 1984 | 105 |
The Chief Weasel visits Badger and Mole, revealing he and the other weasels have bought the part of the Wild Wood upon which stands the entrance to Badger's home. He orders Badger to vacate the property in three days noon, giving him the document from the court of law. When Badger takes the weasels, Rat, Mole and the youngsters to court, Mrs. Carrington-Moss decides in their favour, as the weasels' deed to the property appears to be valid. Faced with eviction, Badger prepares to leave his domicile although owning the friendship and love from Rat, Mole and the youngsters. However, it is Mole who saves the day when he discovers a Roman document signed by Julius Caesar; which gives the ownership of the area that is now the Wild Wood to the badgers and their descendants forever. With this document in hand, Badger and Mole are able to chase the weasels away only minutes before they take permanent possession of his burrow in a struggle against Rat and the young Wild Wooders. Toad does not appear in this episode.
| 6 | "Mole's Cousin" | 5 November 1984 | 106 |
Mole's cousin, a famous literary figure called Auberon Mole, comes to stay after being invited by Toad to a 'literary soiree.' Mole's friends deem his dwelling and appearance too humble for the famous guest, and 'try to give him a little bit of style'. Toad and Rat redecorate Mole's house, and Badger sets out to teach Mole a smattering of Latin and Shakespearean drama. Eventually Mole decides to resist the attempts to have him present himself as someone he is not. Auberon and Mole have a lovely time, and the others are somewhat ashamed of their earlier actions.
| 7 | "The Grand Annual Show" | 12 November 1984 | 107 |
The Grand Annual Show is upon the Riverbank, and Mole's jam, Rat's walnut cake and Badger's pickled walnuts are all in contention for the coveted silver cup. Toad attempts to make elderflower wine, but when his chemistry equipment explodes, ruining the wine, he takes wine from his cellar and tries to pass it off as his own. On the day of the competition, the Riverbankers turn out as well as the weasels, who have an abnormally large pumpkin. Mrs. Carrington-Moss, Reggie, and Rosemary initially award the Silver Cup to the weasels, but the pin on the ribbon exposes the pumpkin as a balloon when it pops the latter. The cup then goes to Toad, but his trickery is exposed when a false label falls off one of the bottles. Last, a group of youngsters come in late with an enormous watermelon, which is finally awarded the silver cup.
| 8 | "The Open Road Again" | 19 November 1984 | 108 |
On a Toad-inspired hiking trip attended by Mole and Rat, the trio soon bump into an old friend – Alfred the horse who once pulled Toad's caravan. Tired of the ghastly (yet only) 3 quarters of a mile journey thus far, Toad leads the way to the derelict caravan full of desire to hit "the open road again". However, things change when a group of field mice lose their homes due to the harvester owned the farmer who also owns Alfred, and they actually want to live in the caravan. In no time at all, Toad is off on another craze astride his new Dursley Pedersen bicycle. Badger does not appear in this episode.
| 9 | "Wayfarers All" | 26 November 1984 | 109 |
Based on chapter 9 of the original book. The Rat is visited by a seafarer, who captivates him with stories of his travels, and entices him to journey south, to embark on a ship bound for Constantinople. Mole and Toad must catch him before he leaves the River Bank behind forever. Badger does not appear in this episode.
| 10 | "The Weasel's Trap" | 3 December 1984 | 110 |
After Badger interrupts the Chief Weasel's attempts to rob Billy Rabbit in the Wild Wood, the angry Chief plots his revenge. When his henchman stumbles upon an old hunter's trap, he sees what seems to be the perfect opportunity. However, despite the Chief setting everything up, things go horribly wrong. Badger unexpectedly takes another route to help judge ownership of a fence between the hedgehogs and the rabbits, and when the Chief Weasel's henchman relocates the trap, the Chief accidentally walks right into it. Upon being caught, the Chief yells so loudly that Rat and Mole hear him from Rat's house, and minutes later the henchman arrives pleading for their help. When they are unable to remove the trap, Rat and Mole enlist Badger for help, much to the chagrin of the Chief. A field mouse reports that he saw the henchman plant the trap, and the game is up for the weasels; but Badger nevertheless frees the Chief, who is begrudgingly thankful. Badger then takes the trap home so as to prevent its further use. Toad does not appear in this episode.
| 11 | "Burglary at Toad Hall" | 10 December 1984 | 111 |
Toad opens Toad Hall to the public with Mrs. Carrington-Moss, Reggie, and Rosemary, in order to (modestly) show off his many family heirlooms, oblivious to the large proportion of weasels in attendance. But the weasels have a dastardly plan to sabotage his efforts, and soon, all of Toad's possessions begin to disappear, causing him terrible embarrassment. Badger, figuring that something is wrong, sneaks into Toad Hall, using the tunnels where, unfortunately for the weasels, is where they happen to be smuggling Toad's possessions out. Fortunately for Toad, Badger manages to drive the weasels out and forces them to return all that they have stolen.
| 12 | "The Piper at the Gates of Dawn" | 17 December 1984 | 112 |
Another dramatization of an episode from Kenneth Grahame's book (chapter 7). Portly, Otter's young son, goes missing. He has picked the worst possible time – there are otter-hunters on the prowl. Enlisting the help of weasels and Riverbankers alike, Badger leads a search, but it proves fruitless. Unable to sleep later that night, Rat and Mole set out on a mission to find him, and in the process have a supernatural encounter with the god Pan- a statue under which Portly, who has also encountered him, is found sleeping.
| 13 | "The Yuletide Entertainment" | 24 December 1984 | 113 |
At the time of the Christmas season, the riverbank residents are organizing a fun gathering where they show off their singing, dancing and instrument-playing talents: Otter on the piano playing "We'll Go Boating", though playing it so badly that he out-staged the weasels; Rat playing accordion and singing Ducks Ditty; Badger's slideshow journey across the world. The pièce de résistance (Toad singing excerpts from Gilbert and Sullivan) suffers a setback when he swallows his fake moustache just before coming on. Mole, who had not intended to appear in the show, is drafted in at the last minute to sing. The episode finishes with a lovely choir song: "Dulce Domum". Sadly, Toad finally manages to cough up his moustache just as the guests are saying their goodnights and Merry Christmas'.

=== Series 2 (1985) ===
| No. | Title | Original release date | Prod. code |
|---|---|---|---|
| 14 | "Winter Sports" | 16 September 1985 | 201 |
It is snowing, and Mr. Toad has dug out his skis. Rallying for a winter sports competition among the Riverbankers, he only finds enthusiasm for a snowman building competition, but the weasels are up for a race, and as usual, there is a bet to be had. However, when the weasels sabotage Toad's efforts, mayhem ensues.
| 15 | "Toad, Photographer" | 23 September 1985 | 202 |
Toad decides that he must have a portrait on the wall in his home, alongside his ancestors, and not being convinced by the merits of painting, he sends for some expensive camera equipment. Having contemptuously disregarded the introductory manual "For Novices", he sets out to practice what he believes to be a natural ability for photography. It soon becomes clear that Toad is not a skilled photographer, and after a number of mishaps (one of which entails Toad falling into the river), Toad gives up and develops the photographs. Inviting all of his friends to see the results, it is revealed that many of them are badly shot or shot with the lens cap still on, which gives the Riverbankers a good laugh and makes Toad somewhat embarrassed
| 16 | "The Rescue" | 30 September 1985 | 203 |
Ernest, a young shrew, is missing in the snow. Rat and Mole discover him with the Chief Weasel and his Assistant, who Ernest calls "Uncle Bill" and "Uncle Bert". They have taken him in after finding him lost and taught him to make a bunny from a handkerchief. Rat and Mole are surprised by the weasels' kind streak, but the weasels are rather affronted to be accused of kindness, and try to pretend they have been mistreating the shrew. Accompanying Ernest home, they encounter Toad. Toad was also searching for the shrew, but became lost along the way. The weasels stole his possessions, and he is displeased to discover that Ernest was treated to his lunch. Badger does not appear in this episode.
| 17 | "Bankruptcy" | 7 October 1985 | 204 |
The weasels intercept Toad's morning newspaper delivery, and discover his new-found interest in stocks and shares. Seizing their opportunity, the Chief and his henchman call on Toad several times, disguised as wealthy businessmen, to sell him shares in their spurious companies. After some persuasion, he agrees to give them first his Rolls-Royce, then other treasured possessions, as payment. Toad Hall quickly becomes very empty, and Badger is furious when he finds out. Of course, the companies all collapse, and Toad soon finds himself bankrupt and about to lose Toad Hall. Fortunately, it does not take long for Badger to find out who is behind all this.
| 18 | "The Storm" | 14 October 1985 | 205 |
It is Badger's birthday, and his friends come bearing gifts. Meanwhile, a storm is brewing. While Ratty secures his boat, Mole and Otter go on ahead to join Toad and Badger in the Wild Wood. Alone, and on his way to Badger's house, Ratty is caught by a falling tree. While the others speculate that Rat has stayed at home, Mole is sure that Ratty would make the trip on Badger's birthday. Mole ventures into the Wood to find the incapacitated Rat, but cannot shift the tree, and he is lost. He seeks the Chief Weasel's assistance, who reluctantly tries to help, before giving up on the pair. The others notice Mole's absence and come to the rescue. Rat recuperates at Toad Hall.
| 19 | "Patient Toad" | 21 October 1985 | 206 |
Toad comes down with a minor cold, but begins to think it something much more serious after he realizes that all his ancestors died young. He searches what he thinks are his father's medical books and realizes that he has come down with a fatal combination of diseases (specifically, armillaria mellea, botrytis, and ranunculus repens). While Rat and Mole diligently wait on the seemingly-dying Toad, Badger searches the books and discovers that Toad's diseases are actually plant ailments. When informed of this, Toad leaps out of bed in happiness, only to fall down the stairs and break his leg.
| 20 | "The Labyrinth" | 28 October 1986 | 207 |
On his way to visit Badger, Ratty stumbles down a hole in the Wild Wood. Injured, he wanders the labyrinth of tunnels while Toad, dressed as Sherlock Holmes, tries to track him down.
| 21 | "Harvest" | 4 November 1985 | 208 |
Badger, Ratty, Mole and Toad go harvesting wild berries and the weasels scheme to steal the hoard. Toad just has his breakfast on his mind, which he pretends that he hasn't eaten and would starve. The weasels proceeded to steal the harvest from the hollow tree that Mole placed into. Ratty, Mole and Badger caught the weasels red-handed, but they were unable to retrieve the berries. But while looking for a secluded place to eat his hamper and have forty winks, Toad stumbles across the weasels' hiding place. And finding the stolen harvest already put down by the weasels, he returns it back to his friends, foiling the weasels' plan.
| 22 | "Auberon's Return" | 11 November 1985 | 209 |
Mole is visited by his cousin Auberon, who is in low spirits after receiving poor reviews for his latest West End offering. Auberon is suffering from writer's block. Word of Auberon's visit has reached the Riverbank, and Mole soon has visitors. Ratty wants feedback for his poetry, while Badger wants to share a literary conversation with the esteemed visitor. Mole tries to protect his cousin, who needs peace and quiet, but hurts Badger's feelings in the process. Toad, too, pays a visit, but proves rather insensitive about the poor reviews. Toad fancies himself quite the playwright, much to Auberon's amusement. After Auberon's visit, he relates in a letter the successes of his new play. Auberon's new comedy, "Oh Jeremy" is based on a "conceited country squire" whose enthusiasms include writing. The character is clearly based on Mr. Toad, although the Toad seems oblivious to the resemblance.
| 23 | "The Great Golfing Gamble" | 18 November 1985 | 210 |
Toad becomes disillusioned with croquet after losing a game with Badger, and discovers a new exciting pastime: golf. Firmly convinced that he is a natural champion, he agrees to a match with the Chief Weasel, for rather high stakes – if Toad loses, the Chief takes Toad Hall. Badger, as usual, despairs at Toad's folly, but may yet be able to save the situation by setting the course from the grounds of Toad Hall to his house in the Wild Wood and back.
| 24 | "Gadget Mad" | 25 November 1985 | 211 |
Toad invites his friends around for a big surprise after tea. He has spent the past weeks installing an electrical generator to power his newfound craze. Toad Hall's stairs are "not in use" thanks to his new elevator, a variety of other strange state-of-the-art appliances also make an appearance, much to the dismay of Mole who loses his best waistcoat to the suction cleansing device. Toad finally returns the devices after he injures himself on the elevator
| 25 | "May Day" | 2 December 1985 | 212 |
May Day celebrations are in full swing on the riverbank, and Toad, Ratty, Badger and Mole are enjoying all the fun of the fair. Toad fails miserably at "Test Your Strength"- he cannot even lift the mallet- whilst Badger breaks the bell. The weasels are set to spoil Mr. Toad's day. Posing as the fortune teller, Madame Pastelengro, after sending the real one away by telling her that her son is injured, the chief's henchman foretells an encounter with "a tall, dark stranger with a foreign accent". Later that day, encountering another weasel who matches this very description, the gullible Toad is persuaded to part with all his belongings. Luckily for him, Badger, Mole and Rat are on hand to uncover the deception.
| 26 | "Fancy Dress" | 9 December 1985 | 213 |
Toad invites everyone to a fancy dress Christmas party, at which he plans on making a surprise entrance. Mole decides that he will go as an Indian chief, while Ratty goes as an admiral and Badger as a rajah. A group of weasels have also shown up at the party, all of them dressed as burglars and criminals, with Chief Weasel as a Gangleader. Throughout the party, they secretly snatch cutlery, jewels, and even Ratty's watch, and hide them in a suit of armor, which turns out to be Toad in costume (he intended to appear as a "knight watchman", but his ancestor's suit was too heavy to move). The plan works fine until the suit falls down the stairs and all the jewels tumble out, along with Toad, who exposes the weasels and has them driven out.

=== Series 3 (1986) ===
| No. | Title | Original release date | Prod. code |
|---|---|---|---|
| 27 | "Paperchase" | 15 September 1986 | 301 |
When the riverbank youngsters accidentally smash one of Mr. Toad's windows while playing cricket, Badger, Ratty and Mole decide a good clean paperchase is in order. With Badger in charge, and Ratty and Mole as checkpoint stewards, the race is complicated by one "Aloysius Weasel" (represented by three runners in disguise), and Mr. Toad, who cannot resist his beloved motorcar (using it to ride between points). There is a booby prize for the cheats. The last two to finish pick up the paper, and, since Toad and "Aloysius" (as Badger puts it, "however many Aloysiuses there were.") were disqualified, they became the last two home.
| 28 | "Mercury of the Motorbicycle" | 22 September 1986 | 302 |
Another motorcar crash turns Toad off motoring. He determines to purchase a motorbicycle, and his friends are unimpressed. Later, a caped motorcyclist is seen to narrowly miss Billy Rabbit, who falls into the canal. The motorcyclist causes havoc around the Riverbank. Badger, Rat and Mole decide to indicate their disapproval by ostracising Toad. Toad has a problem involving his motorbicycle and the Law, but receives little support from his friends. Billy Rabbit realizes that the motorbicyclist was not Mr. Toad after all, and informs Mr. Toad that the culprit was a weasel. Toad tries to re-capture his machine from the Weasels's den but gets trapped. Thankfully, Badger, Rat and Mole come to the rescue and apologise to Toad for their assumptions.
| 29 | "Mr. Toad's Telephone" | 29 September 1986 | 303 |
Toad has bought a new telephone from the weasels, and is very excited about it. But there are a few problems: firstly, the kit has no wires (the weasels point out that he never asked for wires); secondly, no one else on the Riverbank owns a phone. Toad has to spend even more money connecting up his friends, and the situation quickly becomes more complicated than he expected.
| 30 | "Toad, Astronomer" | 6 October 1986 | 304 |
Toad has taken up an interest in stargazing, in anticipation of the return of Halley's Comet. Naturally then, he has bought a telescope at, as Badger puts it, "an astronomical price". Having managed, with some difficulty, to get it onto the roof of Toad Hall, Mole and Rat leave Toad to his observations, and as night falls he spots a moving light which he assumes to be the comet and dubs it 'Toad's Comet'. Little does he realise that the weasels are creeping about with a torch, and suddenly his ladder disappears, leaving him stranded on the roof. He is eventually rescued in the morning and is surprised to hear what the 'comet' he saw actually was.
| 31 | "Caught in a Maze" | 13 October 1986 | 305 |
It's holiday time, and Toad visits the palace at Hampton Court and sees the famous maze. On his return, he decides to restore his father's maze in the grounds of Toad Hall. He challenges Badger, Mole and Rat to a race around the maze, and is sure he will win because he plans to cheat by using some string to mark his path. Mole encounters the string and thinks it will prove jolly useful to grow up his Runner Beans, and picks it up. When Toad gets lost, he attempts to use the string to find his way back, but becomes distressed when he can't find it. Much to his dismay, Toad soon realizes that he is lost in the maze.
| 32 | "School Days" | 20 October 1986 | 306 |
The riverbank youngsters are not at school due to their teacher being indisposed, and Badger decides to organise a makeshift school until she has recovered. Toad, Mole, Ratty and himself will each take some of the children for lessons. Toad's lessons go badly wrong, and students soon start leaving his class and asking to join one of the other animals'. This is because of Toad's lack of academic knowledge – he thinks Columbus; before he discovers the United States of America, won the Battle of Trafalgar! At last, there is only one pupil left, as Toad tries to teach chemistry. The lesson ends with a test-tube exploding, and Toad lying heavily bandaged in Toad Hall. But he soon recovers, and promptly decides to take up pyrotechnics.
| 33 | "Badger's Remedy" | 27 October 1986 | 307 |
Badger and Rat are busy organising the harvest festival, and Mole is unaccountably absent. A concerned Rat calls round to find him seriously ill in bed. Badger suspects mushroom poisoning and organises a search for ingredients to make up an antidote, enlisting the help of riverbankers and weasels alike. One elusive but vital ingredient (a rare fungus) is causing them the most worry, and with time running out for Mole, they need to look in just the right place.
| 34 | "Masterchef" | 3 November 1986 | 308 |
After staying with Mole's cousin Auberon in London, Toad excitedly tells his three friends of the wonderful French cuisine he ate whilst there, and promptly announces his plans to host a special dinner at Toad Hall, which Toad himself will prepare. Toad sets to work on preparing the various dishes, with calamitous results. Upon receiving their error-strewn invitations, Badger, Rat, and Mole agree to attend, and fearing the worst, take their own provisions with them.
| 35 | "Fire at Toad Hall" | 10 November 1986 | 309 |
While out for an autumn stroll, Mole and Rat notice a column of smoke rising from Toad Hall, and hasten to the rescue at once. Toad himself leaves them to extinguish the blaze, then returns and tries to take the credit. Badger arrives and elicits the cause of the fire from Toad: he had been camping indoors (claiming "it looked like rain"), and lit a stove inside the tent. Mole is persuaded to put him up while the Hall is restored, but reluctant to adapt to his bucolic way of life, Toad insists on filling Mole End with his furniture and objets d’art. Of course, this can only lead to trouble. Eventually, Mole gets fed up and leaves to spend time at Ratty's, making sure to lock Toad out of the house.
| 36 | "Unlikely Allies" | 17 November 1986 | 310 |
A dark and mysterious stranger appears in the weasels’ den, and incites the henchman and other weasels to rebellion against the Chief. Under this new influence, they make even more mischief than usual, setting fire to haystacks and stealing Toad's Rolls-Royce. Having forced out the Chief, they then plot to invade Toad Hall and seize it for themselves. For once in his life, the Chief decides to call for Badger's help, and so he is able to warn Toad of the impending attack.
| 37 | "A Producer's Lot" | 24 November 1986 | 311 |
It is 25 years since Badger started running annual dramatic productions in the locality, and Mole and Rat insist that they perform The Pirates of Penzance to mark the occasion. Rat offers to handle the music, and Mole the scenery. Toad, whose father played Major-General Stanley in the first production, demands a big part in this one, but the others are not entirely convinced by his musical abilities.
| 38 | "Champion of the Green Baize" | 1 December 1986 | 312 |
The four friends are at Badger's home playing bridge. Toad however believe he is playing a multitude of different card games and spoils the game for the others, and is heavily chastised by Badger. Sulking in a corner, Toad comes across a newspaper advertisement for a billiard table, and soon enough orders one for Toad Hall. Seizing upon Toad's lack of skill, the Chief Weasel challenges Toad to a game of snooker, with a bet – the Weasel den or Toad's motor car. Toad soon loses; however, witness to this, Badger immediately challenges the Chief Weasel to a game...
| 39 | "Winter Haunts" | 8 December 1986 | 313 |
Snowed in at Toad Hall, the four friends recall the episode in which Mole mistakenly thought his house was haunted. Toad, who is proud of his illustrious ancestors (despite Badger's revelation of how one of them made his money in candles), maintains that a few still haunt the Hall, but no one takes him seriously. Deciding to play a trick on them, Toad retires early to bed, then dresses up as a ghost and waits in the cellar to surprise the others. However, the trick suffers a setback when, before going to bed, Mole locks the cellar door. Luckily, Toad remembers the secret tunnel and is able to find his way to the front door, giving Mole a real fright when the latter answers the door.

=== Series 4 (1987) ===
| No. | Title | Original release date | Prod. code |
|---|---|---|---|
| 40 | "Auld Lang Syne" | 17 September 1987 | 401 |
Toad's New Year's Eve party goes wrong when he locks himself outside and can't find his way around through the rear entrance of his own house. Badger, however, has some serious news which puts a damper on the celebration: a railway company is planning to build its line through the Riverbank, possibly destroying their homes.
| 41 | "Bricks and Mortar" | 24 September 1987 | 402 |
Toad Hall is in need of some renovation work. Badger tells Toad about his ancestor, Inigo, a great architect. Inspired, Toad decides to take up architecture himself, and re-design Toad Hall. As usual, his efforts are somewhat misguided – he thinks the west wing has been put on the wrong side of the hall – and the weasels see yet another opportunity to take advantage of him.
| 42 | "The Lost River" | 1 October 1987 | 403 |
One morning after the storm, Rat return home with Mole after being invited to breakfast, only to discover that the river has disappeared from its channel. Confused and distressed, he enlists the help of Mole, Badger and Toad, and they all set off to find out what happened. But Rat is not the only one to have lost something: on their search, he and Toad encounter a family of fieldmice whose caravan home has been flooded out. Toad is eventually persuaded to put them up at Toad Hall, but meanwhile the others may have found a clue to the disappearance of the river.
| 43 | "The Tournament" | 8 October 1987 | 404 |
Excited by reading 'A Boy's First Book of Wonders', Toad announces that he will host a medieval jousting pageant. Astride his trusty steed (his motorcycle), 'Sir Toad' issues a challenge to joust, which the weasels accept.
| 44 | "Lord Toad" | 15 October 1987 | 405 |
Just miles away from the riverbank, Lord Rushton, a famous archaeologist, has uncovered an ancient barrow. Tired of the inconspicuous life of a country squire, Toad resolves to become "Lord Toad", a famous archaeologist. Toad's excavations meet a tunnel that the Chief Weasel and his assistant are digging. Lamenting his lack of finds, Toad is convinced by the weasels that he has found some ancient artifacts.
| 45 | "Hot Air" | 22 October 1987 | 406 |
Toad's hot air balloon finally arrives, and Badger thinks it will be a good way to survey the approach of the railway. However, when Toad packs a huge hamper to take up with him, only Mole is left to help. The henchman weasel has fallen asleep in the basket, and as Mole tries to carry the hamper he trips over the rope and the balloon begins its ascent. Mole drives along in one of Toad's cars, following the balloon across the countryside. Up in the air, Toad takes photographs of the railway as the henchman tries not to be sick. With too much weight, the balloon starts drifting downward towards a lake. With all the sandbags released, Toad and the henchman fight over who should jump out. Toad pulls the wrong lever and the balloon crashes down into a tree. Examining the developed photographs, Badger is pleased with Toad's efforts. Mole even plays a joke on his friends by pretending that he has become obsessed with cars like Toad.
| 46 | "Fighting Fit" | 29 October 1987 | 407 |
Badger, Rat and Mole are preoccupied with the progress of the railway, which looks set to encroach on the Wild Wood and Riverbank. Toad almost collapses at the end of a long walk, and is rather cross when the others brand him overweight and unfit. He soon orders an array of expensive exercise equipment, which turns out to be quite beyond his capabilities. As Toad cavorts into a cabinet in front of Rat and Mole, a stack of letters is revealed. They refer to a consultation period for those affected by the railway, but Toad has failed to object in time.
| 47 | "Hall for Sale" | 5 November 1987 | 408 |
Disguised as representatives of the railway company, the weasels talk Toad into selling Toad Hall to them. Toad plans to travel the world with the proceeds, until Badger gets wind of the deal and reads the fraudulent contract.
| 48 | "Toad's Harvest" | 12 November 1987 | 409 |
It is autumn, and Rat, Mole and Badger are making preparations for winter, exchanging their home-made jams and preserves. Toad's garden supplies most of the fruits and vegetables for his friends, but Toad himself prefers to buy his own winter provisions in a hamper from London, much to Badger's distaste. Determined to impress them all, Toad buys a canning machine imported from the USA. However, having refused to blanch the vegetables before putting them into the tins, the impression he makes when they are opened is not the sort he planned.
| 49 | "Monster of the Wild Wood" | 19 November 1987 | 410 |
With only a few days to Halloween, the riverbank youngsters are brimming with excitement. Meanwhile, Toad is planning a party for the youngsters and is planning to make the best Halloween mask and costume. Billy Rabbit and the others venture into the Wild Wood to go play trick-or-treat, and they are scared by a monster. When the youngsters come running to his house for help, Toad determines to investigate (After Billy and the others have to help him remove his mask which has become glued to his face). In the Wild Wood, his nerves get the better of him, and terror ensues when the monster reappears, hot on the tail of the weasels. The following day Toad has taken to his bed in fright and Badger explains that the "monster" is, in fact, a steam traction engine, part of the construction effort in the Wild Wood. Toad feels silly and pretends to Badger he knew it was not a monster after all.
| 50 | "Remember, Remember" | 26 November 1987 | 411 |
It is nearing 5 November, Bonfire Night, and the riverbankers decide to celebrate as a welcome distraction from the construction of the railway in the Wild Wood. Toad determines to have fireworks, and after trying his hand at firework-making without success, he heads to London to buy a luxury box. The display is in peril when the weasels steal the wood for the bonfire and the fireworks, but the riverbankers have a merry gathering nevertheless. Seeing the fireworks being let off from the Wild Woods, the riverbankers notice that the woods are on fire. While tending to the injured weasels, Badger offers them asylum in Mr. Toad's outhouses. He makes an impassioned speech for unity in the face of the builders.
| 51 | "Tunnels and Tremors" | 3 December 1987 | 412 |
Toad is planning a Christmas party starring the great magician 'Il Mysterioso' (who looks an awful lot like Toad). Meanwhile, Mole End is struck by an earth tremor. Mole and Rat rescue the trapped Billy Rabbit. Toad's performance eventually goes ahead, but Badger is concerned about the cause of the tremor.
| 52 | "Happy New Year" | 10 December 1987 | 413 |
The New Year brings little cheer for the riverbankers, as the approaching railway threatens to destroy everyone's homes, and even Badger seems to have given up hope. Despite this, Toad insists on holding a New Year's celebration at the Hall, and on providing the entertainment himself (by playing the bagpipes very badly and reading with an exaggerated accent from the poetry of Rabbie Burns). Mole's cousin Auberon is in attendance. During the evening two messengers bring news to the group: the first concerning the weasels and a stolen traction engine; the second concerning new developments on the railway.

=== Series 5 (UK)/Oh, Mr. Toad, Series 1 (International) (1990) ===
| No. | Title | Original release date | Prod. code |
|---|---|---|---|
| 1 | "The Chief's Return" | 27 March 1990 | 101 |
After being arrested and thrown in jail over the business in A Tale of Two Toads. The Chief weasel and his Henchman send some weasels to Toad Hall with a message saying the Chief wants Toad to be the weasels' new leader and arrange a meeting in his prison cell. Gullible Toad believes them and visits the Chief. The Chief and his Henchman trick Toad, escape and take over Toad Hall. When Badger, Mole and Rat find out they do some "Prison Visiting" and set Toad free. Then they think of the perfect "cure" for getting the Chief (who is pretending to be Toad ill in bed) and his henchman (posing as a nurse)out of Toad Hall. Enter " Doctor MacSporran".
| 2 | "Oarsman Toad" | 3 April 1990 | 102 |
Toad decides to enter the "Home-Made Boat Competition" in the River Bank Regatta. However, he can't be bothered to build a boat, and therefore decides to buy one and attempt to pass it off as his own. This plan fails, and he decides to build a boat just to spite the cynical Badger. His first attempt at building a boat fails, but the Weasels offer to help him build another one, and disaster strikes when it sinks with Toad aboard.
| 3 | "Midsummer Night's Disaster" | 10 April 1990 | 103 |
Toad decides to produce the Summer Entertainment, after Badger, who usually does the job, decides to take a year off. Toad decides to do a drastically re-written version of Shakespeare's A Midsummer Night's Dream. The show includes Oberon, the Fairy Characters- Oberon, the King- who turns out to be Robin Hood in disguise- Titania and her attendants, but it also includes D'Artagnan, Ophelia from Hamlet, and most of the cast of Robin Hood. Mole plays Friar Tuck, and Ratty is the Sheriff of Nottingham, but the Chief Weasel and his bumbling henchman are out to sabotage the production. They make scenery and then steal from Toad Hall during the production, but they are spotted as they make their getaway.
| 4 | "The Complete Bungler" | 17 April 1990 | 104 |
Toad takes up fishing. Badger, unusually, encourages this obsession, and offers to give him a lesson in fly fishing. Toad refuses, and goes to London to buy the finest fishing tackle money can buy. With Toad Hall unattended, the weasels decide to steal Toad's motorbike. Will Toad's attempts at fishing be up to scratch?
| 5 | "Mr. Toad of 'The Times'" | 24 April 1990 | 105 |
Annoyed that there is no mention of his speech in the local newspaper, Toad decides to write his own. He interviews his friends, but this does not work out. Mole has nothing exciting to tell Toad – his most exciting experience is winning second-prize at a flower show – and Toad is bored by Badger's account of his travels around the world. He attempts to photograph a fake boating accident with Ratty, but this ends in disaster. However, Toad finally gets the paper together and sets out to make copies of it with his new printing press. Will it work out? The action of this episode is interspersed with Toad's fantasies about when his newspaper is a success – a semi-regular character, a young rabbit named Billy, is seen shouting "Read all about it!", as he attempts to sell "The Toad Hall Times".
| 6 | "Toad in Motion" | 1 May 1990 | 106 |
No one would be silly enough to believe in a perpetual motion machine, would they? Except, of course, for Toad, who acts as generous benefactor to a rather weasely "professor"...
| 7 | "Piano-Roll Toad" | 8 May 1990 | 107 |
Toad inherits a pianola, and decides to impress his friends by pretending that he can play a real piano, in a grand recital at Toad Hall. When the pedal action proves too much of a strain for him, he enlists the help of Billy Rabbit and a modified bicycle. However, once the weasels learn of the trick, they plan an act of sabotage.
| 8 | "Gypsy Toad" | 15 May 1990 | 108 |
Inspired by the lifestyle of an old gypsy that visits Toad Hall, Mr Toad finds his tent and fiddle, and heads out to a new life on the open road... until it rains.
| 9 | "Hip-Hip Soirée!" | 22 May 1990 | 109 |
Bored by Badger's intellectual slide show, Toad decides to hold a soirée at Toad Hall. He starts with a game of charades, but when his opening charade (The Three Musketeers) goes wrong, he calls a halt and suggest they play pin the tail on the donkey instead. This plan goes awry when the blindfolded host falls down a flight of stairs. Badger suggests an impressions game, but Ratty's impression of Toad offends him, and he storms off to bed, vowing never to speak to them again. He then has a strange dream where his friends and the weasels have switched bodies, causing him to see the error of his ways.
| 10 | "Happy Birthday!" | 29 May 1990 | 110 |
28 November is coming. It is a special day for Toad, and though all his friends know it, they are not letting on. Ignoring all his hints, they move the conversation round to astrological signstar signs and astrology, and soon Toad becomes fascinated and decides to become an "astrologer". He even dreams of a mention in the Orders, decorations, and medals of the United Kingdom New Year's Honours List. His fortunes take a turn for the worse when the weasels steal his "pocket watch", but the dawn of 28 November holds some more pleasant surprises…
| 11 | "A Toad in Time" | 5 June 1990 | 111 |
Toad decides to build a "time travelling machine". His friends think that his latest project is doomed to failure. Undaunted, Toad sets to work. He falls asleep and dreams of being "Robin Hood", and then "Julius Caesar". His friends wake him up, but he is convinced he really did go back in time.
| 12 | "Toad in Love" | 12 June 1990 | 112 |
Toad has a new craze: "filming", and has ordered a film camera. He decides to visit a music hall to see a show. Toad falls in love with a singer he sees at the music hall, Lottie D'Urbeville (who never actually appears) which puts him off filming, food and even motoring. Badger discovers that Lettuce Pommefrite (her real name) is married to a "tightrope walker" – how can he break it to Toad gently?
| 13 | "Toad: Film Maker" | 19 June 1990 | 113 |
Toad's new enthusiasm is film-making, but with Badger, Mole and Rat preparing for the winter he seeks other cast members. After the initial failure of a young hedgehog and of Billy Rabbit in the role of the orphan child, the heroine and her villainous father are replaced by the Assistant and Chief Weasel. The screening reveals a rough cut and, amid much hilarity, Mr. Toad's wedding to the Chief Weasel's Assistant. During the movie, Badger remarks to Mole that despite all of Toad's follies, he really had given everyone a little magic with his film. He also says that when they are gone, they will be preserved forever on a little strip of film, showing those in the future of what their lives were like in their time.

== Home releases ==
=== VHS/DVD (Region 2) ===
- VHS – Video Collection International Ltd./DVD – PT Video Ltd.
- The film (1983) (VHS – 28 April 1986 and 11 October 1993 re-release and DVD 2000)
  - Winter (DVD) / Winter Tales (VHS – 3 November 1986 & 17 October 1994) – The Yuletide Entertainment (Cut version on the DVD), Winter Sports, The Rescue (Cut version on the VHS).
  - Summer (DVD) / Summer Escapades (VHS – 5 October 1987 & 1 September 1997) – Toad: Photographer, The Great Golfing Gamble, Grand Annual Show
  - Spring (DVD) / Spring Follies (VHS – 4 April 1988 & 6 March 1995) – The Great Steamer, Paperchase (The Lost River in newer VHS 1995), May Day
  - Autumn (DVD) / Autumn Antics (VHS – 7 November 1988 & 18 September 1995) – Harvest, Monster of the Wild Wood, Remember, Remember
- A Tale of Two Toads (1989) (VHS – 2 October 1989 & 7 March 1994 re-release and DVD 2008)
- The Four Seasons – A 2 VHS boxset (31 August 1998), containing one episode each from the original four season based Videos (see below) – May Day, Grand Annual Show, Harvest and Winter Sports.

VHS

- All VHS titles released by Video Collection International Ltd.
- Masquerade (VHS – 1987) – A Producer's Lot, Winter Haunts, Fancy Dress.
- The Enthusiastic Mr Toad/Oh Toad! (Double Pack VHS – 5 October 1987)
  - The Enthusiastic Mr Toad – Mercury of the Motorbicycle, Mr Toad's Telephone, Toad, Astronomer.
  - Oh Toad! – Caught in a Maze, Masterchef, Champion of the Green Baize.
- Sample VHS tape (7 November 1988) that includes School Days and Hot Air
- The Further Adventures of Mr Toad (VHS – 24 April 1989) – The Further Adventures of Mr Toad, Patient Toad (The Storm in one with a different picture on its VHS cover), Fire at Toad Hall.
- Patient Toad and other stories (VHS – 1 May 1989) – Patient Toad, The Kidnapping of Toad, Badger's Remedy.
- Mole's Cousin and other stories (VHS – 1 May 1989 and 6 May 1991) – Mole's Cousin, Auberon Returns, Happy New Year.
- Oh! Mr Toad! (VHS – 5 February 1990) – Oarsman Toad, Midsummer Night's Disaster, The Complete Bungler.
- The Wind in the Willows Bumper Special (VHS – 10 September 1990) – Mr Toad of the Times, Toad in Motion, Piano-Roll Toad, Gypsy Toad, Toad in Love.
- Happy Birthday and other stories (VHS – 7 October 1991) – Happy Birthday, A Toad in Time, Film Maker.
- Lord Toad and other stories (VHS – 6 April 1992) – Lord Toad, Hall for Sale, Toad's Harvest.
- The Labyrinth and other stories (VHS – 1 June 1992) – The Labyrinth, Bankruptcy, Unlikely Allies.
- My Bumper The Wind In The Willows: Fun & Games (VHS – 5 May 1997) – Mercury of the Motorbicycle, Champion of the Green Baize, The Tournament, Hot Air, Fighting Fit.

VHS Compilations

- Children's Favourites – Volume 1 (1 February 1988) – Wayfarers All. (Compilation VHS with Danger Mouse and Alias the Jester)
- Lollipop Children's Favourites Vol. 1 (1 May 1989) – Gadget Mad. (Compilation VHS with Count Duckula and Danger Mouse)
- Lollipop Children's Favourites Vol. 2 (1 May 1989) – The Ghost at Mole End. (Compilation VHS with Count Duckula and Danger Mouse)
- More Children's Summer Stories (5 June 1989) – The Tournament. (Compilation VHS with Count Duckula and Danger Mouse)
- More Children's Holiday Favourites (4 June 1990) – Fighting Fit. (Compilation VHS with Count Duckula and Danger Mouse)
- The Christmas Collection (5 October 1992) – Auld Lang Syne. (Compilation VHS with The Sooty Show and Rainbow)

DVD

- In 2003, Time Life DVD released a set of six DVDs with four digitally re-mastered episodes on each disc containing various episodes from Series 1 – 3; these were as follows:

1. Classic Willows Tales – 1. The Yuletide Entertainment (cut version), 2. Caught in a Maze, 3. Grand Annual Show, 4. Badger's Remedy.

2. Typical Toad – 1. Mercury of the Motor bicycle, 2. Burglary at Toad Hall, 3. Fire at Toad Hall, 4. Patient: Toad.

3. Ratty and Mole:Chums For Life – 1. The Ghost at Mole End, 2. The Great Steamer, 3. The Piper at the Gates of Dawn, 4. The Storm.

4. Champion of the Willows – 1. Paper Chase, 2. The Great Golfing Gamble, 3. Champion of the Green Baize, 4. Winter Sports.

5. Those Wily Weasels – 1. The Weasels' Trap, 2. The Rescue, 3. Unlikely Allies, 4. Fancy-Dress.

6. Wise Old Badger – 1. Buried Treasure, 2. Harvest, 3. School Days, 4. A Producer's Lot.

These DVDs are now out of print:

- The Four Seasons – released in May 2006
- The Complete Series 1 – released on 26 March 2007
- The Complete Series 2 – released on 25 June 2007
- Wind In The Willows – The Complete Collection – released on 13 October 2008 (features all 65 episodes including those from Oh Mr. Toad! plus both films)
- 3 DVDs were made as part of a one-off Daily Mail event around the end of 2008, each containing six episodes. Two of them are similar to The Four Seasons collection.
  - Disc One: Six classic episodes from the 1st series – The Further Adventures of Toad, The Kidnapping of Toad, The Ghost at Mole End, Buried Treasure, Mole's Cousin, The Open Road Again.
  - Disc Two: Spring and Summer – The Great Steamer, The Lost River, Paper Chase, May Day, Toad: Photographer, The Great Golfing Gamble, Grand Annual Show.
  - Disc Three: Autumn and Winter – The Harvest, Monster of the Wild Wood, Remember, Remember, The Yuletide Entertainment, Winter Sports, The Rescue.

=== DVD (Region 1) ===
In North America, home media distribution of both the show and the movie were handled by A&E Home Entertainment, under licence from Thames, talkbackTHAMES, FremantleMedia International and FremantleMedia Kids & Family Entertainment. Previously, the film had been made available on VHS from HBO Video under licence from Thames.

- The film (1983)
- A Tale of Two Toads (1989)
- The Feature Films Collection – a compendium of The Movie and A Tale of Two Toads.
- The Complete First Series
- The Complete Second Series
- The Wind in the Willows Four-Pack – includes both feature films, and the complete first and second series.

=== DVD (Region 4) ===
- The film (1983) – There have been VHS releases of Summer, Autumn, Winter and Spring, among others. Fremantle Media also released the complete series in Australia and New Zealand.
