= The Wind in the Willows (1983 film) =

1983 British stop-motion animated television film

- Cover of the American DVD release by A&E Home Entertainment
- Directed by: Mark Hall; Chris Taylor (animation director)
- Screenplay by: Rosemary Anne Sisson
- Based on: The Wind in the Willows by Kenneth Grahame
- Produced by: Brian Cosgrove; Mark Hall; John Hambley
- Starring: David Jason; Richard Pearson; Ian Carmichael; Michael Hordern
- Edited by: John McManus
- Music by: Keith Hopwood (music and score); Malcolm Rowe (lyrics and score)
- Production company: Cosgrove Hall Productions
- Distributed by: ITV
- Release date: 27 December 1983
- Running time: 79 minutes
- Country: United Kingdom
- Language: English

The Wind in the Willows is a 1983 British stop motion animated film produced by Cosgrove Hall Productions for Thames Television and aired on the ITV network. The film is based on Kenneth Grahame's classic 1908 novel The Wind in the Willows. It won a BAFTA award and an international Emmy award.

Between 1984 and 1990, Cosgrove Hall subsequently made a 52-episode television series, with the film serving as a pilot. The film's music and songs are composed by Keith Hopwood, late of Herman's Hermits and Malcolm Rowe. The Stone Roses guitarist John Squire worked on the series as a set artist. Voice actors include David Jason, Ian Carmichael and Michael Hordern.

== Plot ==
Disenchanted with spring cleaning, Mole ventures out of his underground home and comes across a river. He meets Rat, and the two quickly become friends. They visit the wealthy Toad, who convinces them to join him on a road trip in a Romani wagon. After a speeding motor car causes the wagon to crash, Toad becomes obsessed with cars.

Toad buys and quickly crashes one car after another, and gets repeatedly fined for his reckless driving. During the winter, Rat and Mole decide to ask Badger for help in disciplining Toad. One night, Mole tries to find Badger's home in the Wild Wood. Lost in the forest, he becomes terrified. Rat eventually finds him, and the two stumble across Badger's house. After Rat and Mole tell Badger about Toad's obsession with cars, the three of them try to convince Toad to give up motoring, but Toad refuses. They lock Toad in his bedroom, but he escapes out the window and runs off. After stealing a car and insulting a police officer, Toad is sentenced to twenty years in prison. Mole becomes homesick, so he and Rat visit Mole's abandoned home.

Aided by a washerwoman's daughter, Toad escapes prison by disguising himself as a washerwoman. Pursued by the police, he hitches a ride on a steam locomotive. He arrives at Rat's house, where he is told by Rat and Mole that weasels have taken over Toad Hall, Toad's home. The following night, the four friends sneak into Toad Hall through an underground passage and battle the weasels. They manage to knock all the weasels unconscious and retake the house. Later, as Rat, Mole and Badger are relaxing by the riverbank, Toad flies over them in an airplane, then crashes into the river. During the end credits, Toad is hauled out of the river by his friends.

== Behind the scenes ==
The weasels have a greater role and are considerably more villainous and menacing in this adaptation of Kenneth Grahame's beloved story. The main banqueting hall and grand staircase of Toad Hall were inspired by the ones in Loftus Hall, a country house on the Hook peninsula in County Wexford in the south-east of Ireland.

== Cast ==
- David Jason as Toad / Chief Weasel
- Richard Pearson as Mole
- Ian Carmichael as Rat
- Michael Hordern as Badger
- Beryl Reid as Mrs Carrington-Moss, the magistrate
- Una Stubbs as The Jailer's daughter / Rosemary, Reggie's wife
- Jonathan Cecil as Reggie, the motorist
- Brian Trueman as Henchman Weasel / various voices
- Allan Bardsley as Alfred the Horse / Policeman / Jailer
- Edward Kelsey as Engine Driver / Clerk

== Reception ==
The film received critical acclaim from critics and audiences for its faithfulness to Kenneth Grahame's book. Teresa Talerico of Common Sense Media gave the film four stars out of five, describing it as "[t]wo charming buddy capers from classic series".

== See also ==
- The Adventures of Ichabod and Mr. Toad
- The Wind in the Willows (1995 film)
- The Wind in the Willows (1996 film)
- The Wind in the Willows (2006 film)
