= A Tale of Two Toads =

British stop-motion animated television programme (1989)

- Written by: Brian Trueman
- Starring: David Jason; Richard Pearson; Peter Sallis; Michael Hordern; Brian Southwood; Brian Trueman; Jimmy Hibbert
- Country of origin: United Kingdom

Production
- Running time: 60 minutes
- Production company: Cosgrove Hall Productions

Original release
- Network: ITV Network (CITV)
- Release: 29 December 1989

A Tale of Two Toads is a 1989 hour-long feature from the 1980s stop motion animation series The Wind in the Willows, which itself was based on the 1908 novel by Kenneth Grahame. The film was animated by Cosgrove Hall and broadcast on Children's ITV. A further season of 13 episodes was shown under the title, Oh, Mr. Toad in some countries, whilst retaining the title The Wind in the Willows in others.

== Plot ==
Good friends Badger, Rat and Mole enjoy a quiet and beautiful day by the river near Toad Hall in the English countryside. Their eccentric friend Toad himself, following his latest fad, arrives in his new steam-powered punt, but crashes and has to be fished from the river. Unknown to the friends, the Chief Weasel, Toad's arch-enemy, and his new partner, who is the spitting image of Toad himself, observe from nearby. Back at the weasel's den, the Chief introduces his partner as Isambard Beerbohm Toad: a stage actor, impersonator and confidence trickster. Using his talents, they plan to kidnap Toad and assume his identity, with the goal of acquiring Toad Hall and its wealth. Having observed Toad, Isambard can imitate his voice and mannerisms perfectly, and they ambush Toad, tying him up in the Hall's wine cellar.

The next morning, Isambard, assuming Toad's identity, evicts young Billy Rabbit and the field mice out of Toad's old caravan and visits Mole, Rat and Badger to spread vicious lies to sabotage their friendships and prevent them from interfering with affairs at the Hall. This fails when the rumours fall apart, and when they confront "Toad" he orders them off the property, which he cohabits with the weasels. However, the three observe some oddities in "Toad's" behaviour: he mistakenly refers to the female local magistrate as a man and was unfamiliar with Mole End, Mole's residence which he has visited often, and they realise that this Toad is a false one.

While having to wash dishes, the real Toad discovers his old maid's uniform and uses it as a disguise to escape, just like how he escaped from prison as a washerwoman. But is given away by his suit which he is accidentally wearing underneath and is caught. Forced to wait on the weasels while dressed in the uniform, the three friends realise his plight and sneak into the Hall via a tunnel with a distraction by Billy and the mice. Capturing Isambard when he visits the wine cellar, instead of getting Toad to safety Badger has Toad assume Isambard's identity to spy on the Weasels. The next morning, Toad pretends to visit London as Isambard and reports back to his friends. The plot unwinds: the Weasels plan to dynamite Mole End, Rat's river house and Badger's burrow, forcing them to leave the area while keeping the real Toad as a permanent prisoner. To avoid suspicion, Toad is convinced to return to the Hall, just in time to prevent the real Isambard from exposing Toad. The weasels sent to blow up the homes are captured by the three friends and their other friend Otter. The explosives are detonated harmlessly to trick the weasels out into the open.

The riverbankers all arrive at the Hall and capture the remaining weasels, but Isambard, escaping his bonds, has disguised himself as Toad again. The two hectically chase each other around the dining room, ending with Isambard being knocked out. Before fainting, Toad proves himself to be the true Toad by crying "Semper Bufo": Latin for the family motto "always a Toad." The imposter and Chief Weasel are arrested and sent to jail while the friends enjoy another peaceful day by the river, and Toad takes up yet another craze: stage acting.

== Cast ==
- David Jason as Toad / Chief Weasel / Billy Rabbit / Isambard's Toad voice
- Richard Pearson as Mole
- Peter Sallis as Rat
- Sir Michael Hordern as Badger
- Brian Southwood as Otter
- Brian Trueman as Henchman Weasel / various characters
- Jimmy Hibbert as Isambard Toad / Ernest / various characters
