= My Good Friend =

- Genre: Sitcom
- Written by: Bob Larbey
- Directed by: Martin Dennis (Series 1); Jeremy Ancock (Series 2)
- Starring: George Cole; Richard Pearson; Minnie Driver; Lesley Vickerage
- Country of origin: United Kingdom
- Original language: English
- No. of series: 2
- No. of episodes: 14

Production
- Producer: Beryl Vertue
- Running time: 30 minutes
- Production companies: Hartswood Films; Anglia Television

Original release
- Network: ITV
- Release: 4 April 1995 – 8 October 1996

My Good Friend is a British television sitcom produced by Hartswood Films in association with Anglia Television for ITV, and it ran for two years between 4 April 1995 and 8 October 1996. It starred George Cole and Richard Pearson as widowed pensioner Peter Banks (Cole) and retired librarian Harry King (Pearson). The show ran for two series, each of seven episodes.

== Synopsis ==
Widower and ex-postman Peter Banks lives with his daughter Betty and son-in-law Brian but knows that his presence there is uncomfortable for all three. He strikes up an unlikely friendship with mild mannered retired librarian Harry King, which gives them both a new lease of life. Gradually Peter and Harry realise that they can fill the gaps in each other's lives and Peter moves into the spare room at his landlady Ellie's house.

== Cast ==
- George Cole - Peter Banks
- Richard Pearson - Harry King
- Minnie Driver - Ellie (Series 1)
- Lesley Vickerage - Ellie (Series 2)
- Matilda Ziegler - Betty (Series 1)
- Annabelle Apsion - Betty (Series 2)
- Michael Lumsden - Brian
- Joan Sims - Miss Byron

== Episodes ==
=== Series 1 (1995) ===
No. overall	No. in series	Title	Original release date
1	1	"When Peter Met Harry"	4 April 1995
2	2	"Leaving"	11 April 1995
3	3	"Family Planning"	18 April 1995
4	4	"Ellie’s Boyfriend"	25 April 1995
5	5	"The Dinner Dance"	2 May 1995
6	6	"A Night at the Opera"	9 May 1995
7	7	"Meddling"	16 May 1995

=== Series 2 (1996) ===
No. overall	No. in series	Title	Original release date
8	1	"Forgetfulness"	27 August 1996
9	2	"Beside the Seaside"	2 September 1996
10	3	"Warfare"	10 September 1996
11	4	"The Virus"	17 September 1996
12	5	"Dreaming"	24 September 1996
13	6	"Singing"	1 October 1996
14	7	"Pickles"	8 October 1996
