= Michael Hordern =

English actor (1911–1995)

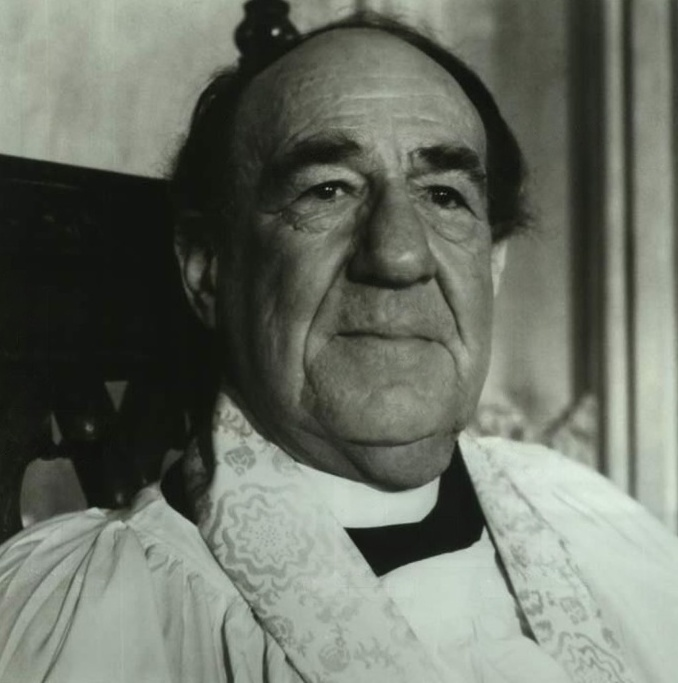
Hordern in 1986

Sir Michael Murray Hordern (3 October 1911 – 2 May 1995) was an English actor. He is best known for his Shakespearean roles, especially King Lear. He often appeared in film, rising from a bit part actor to leading roles; by the time of his death he had appeared in nearly 140 films. His later work was predominantly in television and radio.

Born in Berkhamsted, Hertfordshire, into a family with no theatrical connections, Hordern was educated at Windlesham House School, then located in Portslade, East Sussex. He went on to Brighton College, where his interest in the theatre developed. After leaving the college he joined an amateur dramatics company, and came to the notice of several influential Shakespearean directors who cast him in minor roles in Othello and Macbeth. During the Second World War he served on HMS Illustrious, reaching the rank of lieutenant-commander. Upon demobilisation he resumed his acting career and made his television debut, becoming a bit-part actor in many films, particularly in the war film genre.

Hordern came to prominence in the early 1950s when he took part in a theatrical competition at the Arts Theatre in London. This led to a season-long contract at the Shakespeare Memorial Theatre, where he played major parts including Caliban in The Tempest, Jaques in As You Like It, and Sir Politick Would-Be in Ben Jonson's comedy Volpone. The following season Hordern joined Michael Benthall's company at the Old Vic where, among other parts, he played Polonius in Hamlet, and the title role in King John. In 1957 he won the British Academy Television Award for Best Actor for his role as the barrister in John Mortimer's courtroom drama The Dock Brief. Along with his theatrical responsibilities Hordern had regular supporting roles in various films including Cleopatra (1963), and A Funny Thing Happened on the Way to the Forum (1966).

In the late 1960s Hordern met the British theatre director Jonathan Miller, who cast him in Whistle and I'll Come to You, which was recorded for television and received wide praise. Hordern's next major play was Jumpers at the Royal National Theatre in 1972. His performance was praised by critics and he reprised the role four years later. Hordern's television credits towards the end of his life included Paradise Postponed, the BAFTA award-winning Memento Mori, and the BBC adaptation of Middlemarch. He was appointed a CBE in 1972 and was knighted eleven years later. Hordern suffered from kidney disease during the 1990s and died from it in 1995, aged 83.

== Life and career ==
=== Early life and education ===
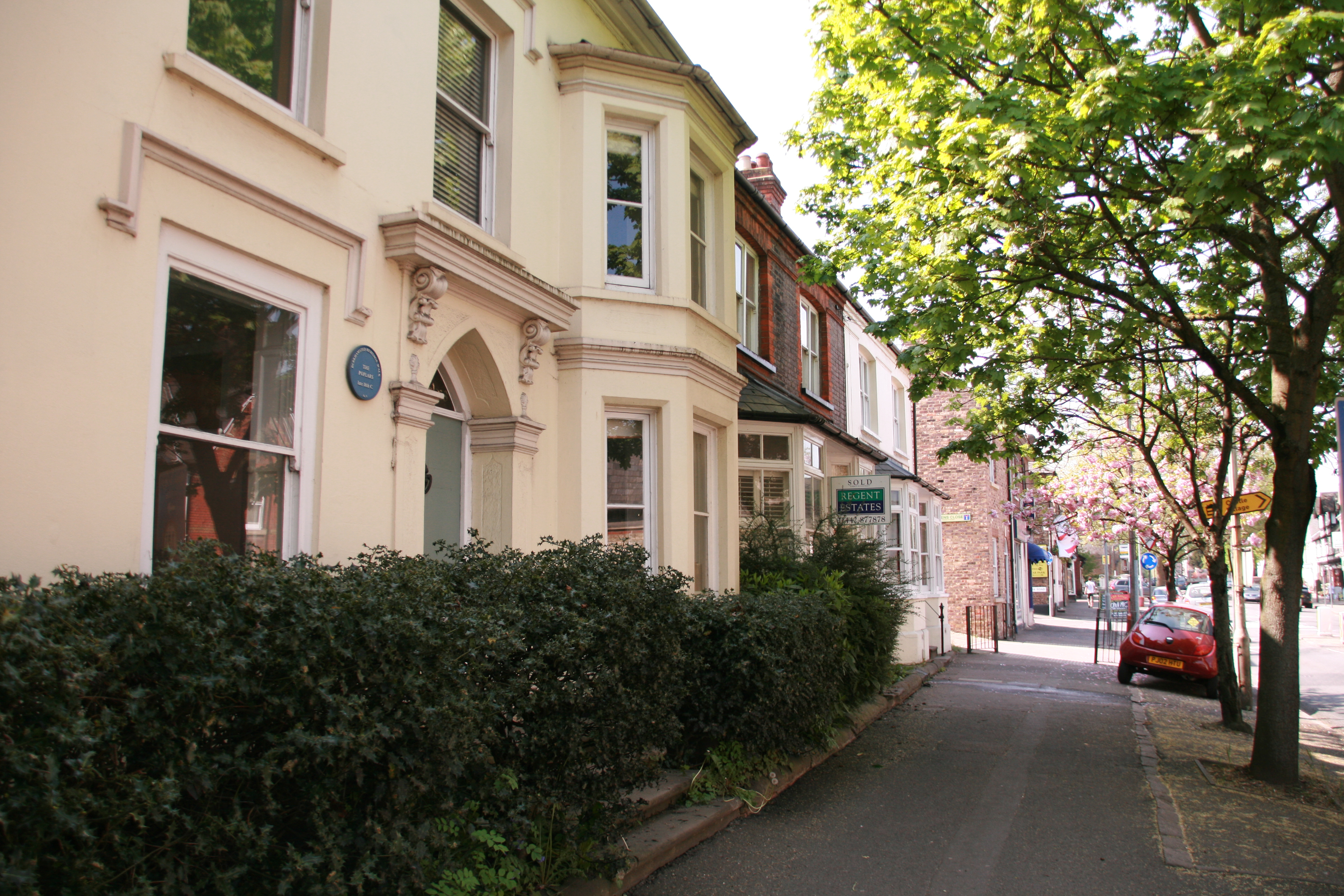
The Poplars, Hordern's birthplace in Berkhamsted, Hertfordshire

Hordern was born on 3 October 1911 at Berkhamsted, Hertfordshire, third son of Edward Joseph Calveley Hordern, of a family of Hampshire landed gentry with a strong clerical tradition, and Margaret Emily, daughter of mechanical engineer Edward Francis Murray.

Edward Hordern's father, Rev. Joseph Calveley Hordern, was the rector at the Holy Trinity Church in Bury. As a young man Edward joined the Royal Indian Marines and gained the rank of lieutenant. During a short break on home-leave he fell in love with Margaret, after they were introduced by one of his brothers. The courtship was brief and the young couple married in Burma on 28 November 1903. They had their first child, a son, Geoffrey, in 1905, followed by another, Peter, in 1907. (Note: Peter "Shrimp" Hordern (1907–1987) was a keen sportsman and excelled at Rugby. After he left school he went to Oxford where he won a blue, and later played rugby for England.)

Margaret was descended from James Murray, an Irish physician whose research into digestion led to his discovery of the stomach aid milk of magnesia in 1829. (Note: After brief employment working for Isambard Kingdom Brunel, Murray studied in pharmaceuticals. Murray used a fluid magnesia preparation of his own design to treat the Lord Lieutenant of Ireland's stomach pain. It was so effective that it was approved by the Royal College of Surgeons in 1838.) The invention earned him a knighthood and brought the family great wealth. Margaret grew up in England, and attended St Audries School for Girls in Somerset. (Note: Margaret Emily Murray was born in County Wicklow. She died in 1933. Hordern gave her cause of death as "exhaustion".)

Four years after the birth of Peter, a pregnant Margaret returned to England, where Michael Hordern, her third son, was born. Still stationed abroad, Edward was promoted to the rank of captain, for which he received a good salary. The family lived in comfort, and Margaret employed a scullery maid, nanny, groundsman, and full-time cook. Margaret left for India to visit her husband in 1916. The trip, although planned only as a short term stay, lasted two years because of the First World War. In her absence, Hordern was sent to Windlesham House School in Sussex at the age of five. His young age exempted him from full-time studies but he was allowed to partake in extracurricular activities, including swimming, football, rugby and fishing. After a few years, and along with a fellow enthusiast, he set up the "A Acting Association" (AAA) a small theatrical committee, which organised productions on behalf of the school. As well as the organisation of plays, Hordern arranged a regular group of players, with him, to perform plays which they wrote, directed, and choreographed. He stayed at Windlesham House for nine years, later describing his time there as "enormous fun".

Hordern was 14 when he left Windlesham House to continue his schooling as a member of Chichester House at Brighton College. By the time of his enrolment, his interest in acting had matured. In his 1993 autobiography, A World Elsewhere, he admitted: "I didn't excel in any area apart from singing; I couldn't read music but I sang quite well". There he helped organise amateur performances of Gilbert and Sullivan operas. The first of these was The Gondoliers, in which he played the role of the Duchess. The tutors called his performance a great success, and he was given a position within the men's chorus in the next piece, Iolanthe. In the next few years, he took part in The Mikado as a member of the chorus, and then appeared as the Major-General in The Pirates of Penzance. It was a period which he later acknowledged as being the start of his career. When the war ended in 1918, Edward, who was by now a port officer in Calcutta, arranged for Margaret to return to England. With her, she brought home an orphaned baby girl named Jocelyn, whom she adopted. (Note: Jocelyn was the last one of triplet sisters to be born. She was the only child to survive the birth, which also claimed the life of her mother. Jocelyn was spurned by her only living relative, an English aunt, because of the child's illegitimacy.) The following year, Edward retired from active service and returned to England, where he relocated his family to Haywards Heath in Sussex. There, Michael developed a love for fishing, a hobby that he followed for the rest of his life.

In his autobiography, Hordern wrote that his family showed no interest in the theatre and that he had not seen his first professional play, Ever Green, until he was 19. Around this time he met Christopher Hassall, a fellow student at Brighton College. Hassall, who also went on to have a successful stage career, was, as Hordern noted, instrumental in his decision to become an actor. In 1925 Hordern moved to Dartmoor with his family where they converted a disused barn into a farm house. For Hordern the move was ideal; his love of fishing had become stronger and he was able to explore the remote landscape and its isolated rivers.

=== Early acting career (1930–39) ===
==== Theatrical beginnings ====
Hordern left Brighton College in the early 1930s and secured a job as a teaching assistant in a prep school in Beaconsfield. He joined an amateur dramatics company and in his spare time, rehearsed for the company's only play, Ritzio's Boots, which was entered into a British Drama League competition, with Hordern in the title role. The play did well but conceded the prize, a professional production at a leading London theatre, to Not This Man, a drama written by Sydney Box. So envious was he of the rival show's success that Hordern supplied a scathing review to The Welwyn Times calling Box's show a "blasphemous bunk and cheap theatrical claptrap". The comment infuriated Box, who issued the actor with a writ to attend court on a count of slander. Hordern won the case and left Box liable for the proceeding's expenses. Years later the two men met on a film set where Box, much to Hordern's surprise, thanked him for helping to kick-start his career in film making, as he had received a lot of publicity as a result of the court case.

With the death of his mother in January 1933, Hordern decided to pursue a professional acting career. He briefly took a job at a prep school but fell ill with poliomyelitis and had to leave. Upon his recuperation, he was offered a job as a travelling salesman for the British Educational Suppliers Association, a family-run business belonging to a former school friend at Windlesham House. As part of his job he spent some time in Stevenage where he joined an amateur dramatics company and appeared in two plays; Journey's End, in which he played Raleigh, and Diplomacy, a piece which the actor disliked as he considered it to be "too old-fashioned". Both productions provided him with the chance to work with a cue-script, (Note: A cue-script was a script which featured cue-lines. Each cue-line acted as a prompt for the other performer.) something which he found to be helpful for the rest of his career. That summer he joined a Shakespearean theatre company which toured stately homes throughout the United Kingdom. His first performance was Orlando in As You Like It, followed by Love's Labour's Lost, in which he co-starred with Osmond Daltry. (Note: Daltry came to serve as an officer in 135th regiment during the Second World War. He was captured in Singapore and held as a prisoner of war, during which he organised camp shows to entertain fellow prisoners. He later made an attempt to escape from the camp, which left him with serious and lasting injuries. Despite his disabilities he would later become a successful theatre manager.) Hordern admired Daltry's acting ability and later admitted to him being a constant influence on his Shakespearean career.

In addition to his Shakespearean commitments, Hordern joined the St Pancras People's Theatre, a London-based company partly funded by the theatrical manager Lilian Baylis. Hordern enjoyed his time there, despite the tiresome commute between Sussex and London, and stayed with the company for five years. By the end of 1936 he had left his sales job in Beaconsfield to pursue a full-time acting career. He moved into a small flat at Marble Arch and became one of the many jobbing actors eager to make a name for themselves on the London stage.

==== London debut ====
Hordern's London debut came in January 1937, as an understudy to Bernard Lee in the play Night Sky at the Savoy Theatre. On nights when he was not required, Hordern would be called upon to undertake the duties of assistant stage manager, for which he was paid £2.10s a week. In March, Daltry, who had since formed his own company, Westminster Productions, cast Hordern as Ludovico in Othello. The part became Hordern's first paid role as an actor for a theatre company. The play was an instant hit and ran at the People's Theatre in Mile End for two weeks. It also starred the English actor Stephen Murray in the title role, but he became contractually obliged elsewhere towards the end of the run. This allowed Hordern to take his place for which Daltry paid Hordern an extra £1 a week. (Note: £1 a week equates to £59 in 2025 (adjusted for inflation).)

After Othello's closure, Daltry undertook a tour of Scandinavia and the Baltic with two plays, Outward Bound, and Arms and the Man. He employed Hordern in both with the first being the more successful. It was a time that the actor recognised as being a turning point in his professional acting career. On his return to London, and after spending a few weeks in unemployment, he was offered a part in the ill-fated Ninety Sail. The play, about Samuel Pepys and the Royal Navy, was cancelled on the day Hordern was due to start work, with "unforeseen problems" cited as the reason by its producers.

==== Bristol repertory theatre ====
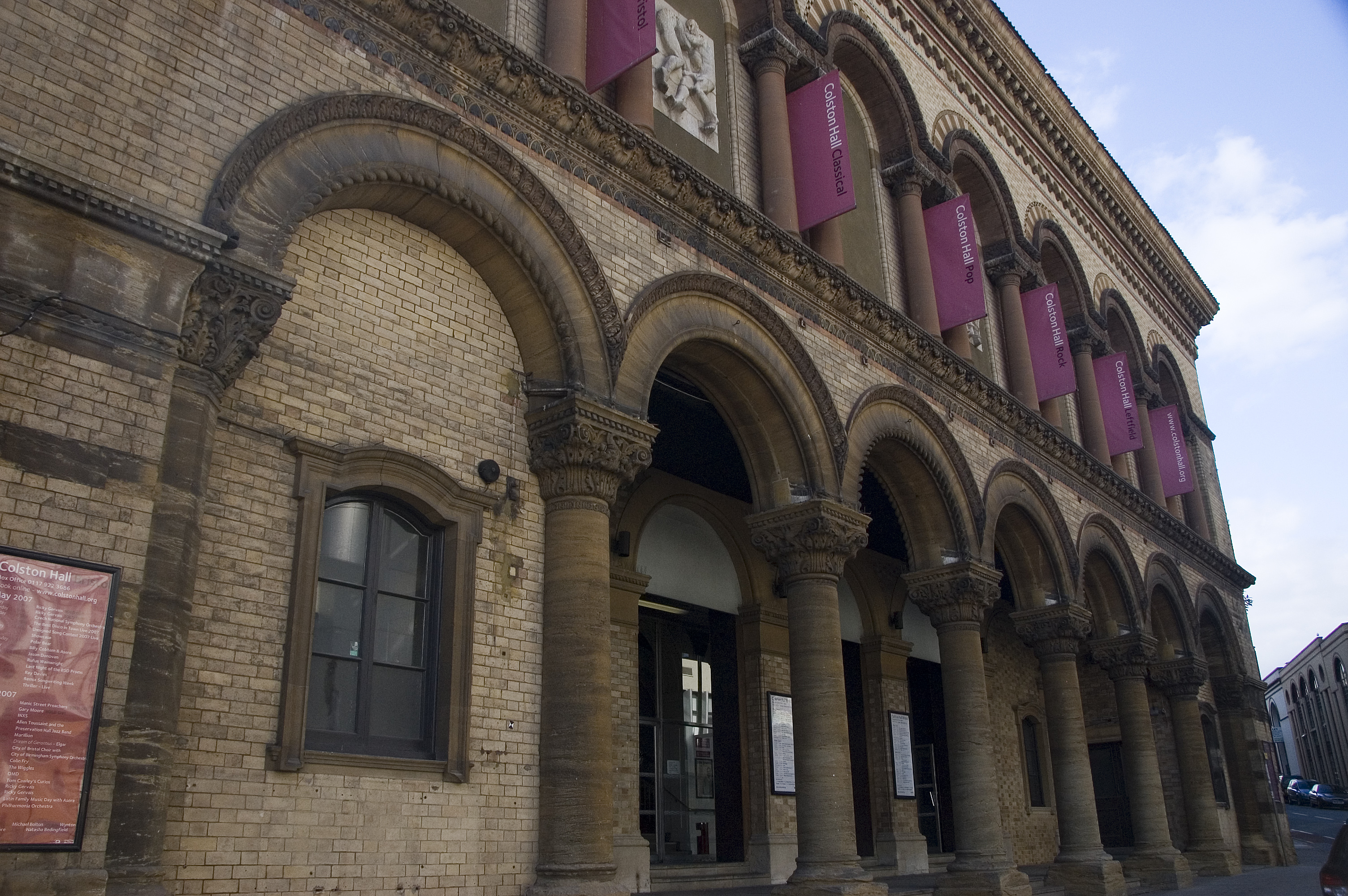
Colston Hall, Bristol, the former home of the Rapier Players

In mid-1937 the theatre proprietor Ronald Russell offered Hordern a part in his repertory company, the Rapier Players, who were then based at Colston Hall in Bristol. Hordern's first acting role within the company was as Uncle Harry in the play Someone at the Door. Because of the play's success, Russell employed him in the same type of role, the monotony of which frustrated the actor who longed to play the leading man. It was whilst with the Rapier Players that Hordern fell in love with Eve Mortimer, a juvenile actress who appeared in minor roles in many of Russell's productions. Hordern considered his experience with the Rapier Players to be invaluable; it taught him how a professional theatre company worked under a strict time frame and how it operated with an even stricter budget. He was allowed two minutes to study each page of the script, but because of the frequent mistakes and many stalled lines, rehearsals became long and laborious. Hordern described the company's props as being made to a very high standard, despite being bought on a shoe-string budget.

After a brief holiday with Eve in Scotland in 1938, Hordern returned to London, where he appeared in Quinneys, a radio play broadcast by the BBC in June of that year. The main part went to Henry Ainley whom Hordern described as "a great actor, who, sadly, was past his best". Hordern then made a return to Bristol to prepare for the following season with the Rapier Players. One production singled out in the Western Daily Press as particularly good was Love in Idleness, in which Hordern played the lead character. A reporter for the paper thought that the play "had been noticed" among theatrical critics and that the players "filled their respective roles excellently".

By the end of 1938 Hordern's father had sold the family home and had bought a cottage in Holt, near Bath, Somerset. The arrangement was convenient for the young actor, who used the premises as a base while he appeared in shows with the Rapier Players. One such piece was an adaption of Stella Gibbons's Cold Comfort Farm, which starred Mabel Constanduros, who had adapted the book with Gibbons's permission. Hordern was cast in the supporting role of Seth, a part he described as being fun to perform. The modernised script was "adored" by the cast, according to Hordern, but loathed by the audience who expected it to be exactly like the book. (Note: Writing in his autobiography, Hordern explained the reason why the play was so unsuccessful: "Cold Comfort Farm horrified Bristol audiences, who imagined they would be in for an evening of pastoral idyll. Instead they were treated to a complete send-up of all pastoral idylls and they left in droves.")

=== Second World War and film debut ===
Hordern and Eve left Bristol in 1939 for Harrogate, where Eve joined a small repertory company called the White Rose Players. After a brief spell of unemployment, and with the outbreak of war, Hordern volunteered for a post within the Air Raid Precautions (ARP). He was accepted but soon grew frustrated at not being able to conduct any rescues because of the lack of enemy action. He decided that it was "not a very good way to fight the war" and volunteered for the Royal Navy. While he was waiting to be accepted he and Eve responded to an advertisement in The Stage for actors in a repertory company in Bath. They were appointed as the company's leading man and lady. Their first and only engagement was in a play entitled Bats in the Belfry which opened at the city's Assembly Rooms on 16 October. Hordern's elation at finally becoming a leading man was short-lived when he received his call-up that December. In the interest of helping to boost public morale, Hordern sought permission from the navy to allow him to complete his theatrical commitment in Bath and to appear in his first film, a thriller called Girl in the News, directed by Carol Reed; his request was accepted, and he was told to report for duty at Plymouth Barracks in the early months of 1940 when the show had finished and he was free from filming responsibilities.

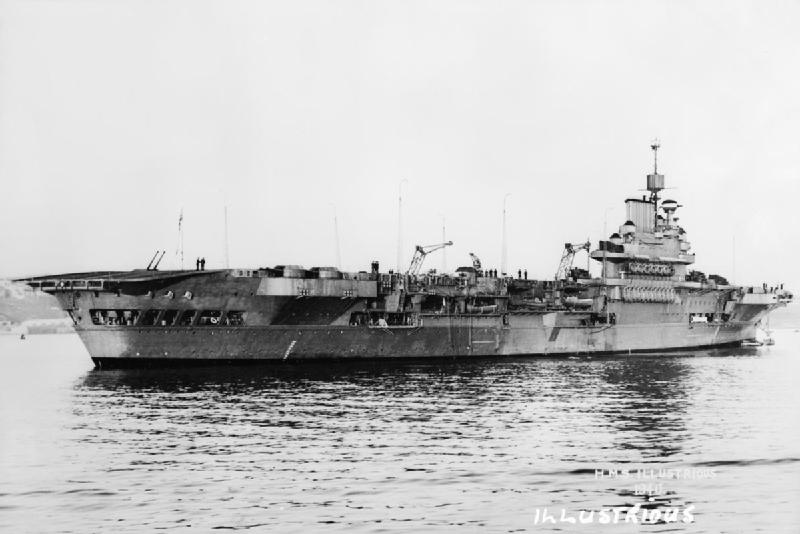
HMS Illustrious, on which Hordern served during the Second World War

In 1940, after a minor role in Without the Prince at the Whitehall Theatre, Hordern played the small, uncredited part of a BBC official alongside James Hayter in Arthur Askey's comedy film Band Waggon. Soon after, he began his naval gunnery training on board City of Florence, a defensively equipped merchant ship (DEMS) which delivered ammunition to the city of Alexandria for the Mediterranean Fleet. He found that although his middle class upbringing hindered his ability to make friends on board the ship, it helped with his commanding officers.

By 1942 Hordern had been commissioned as an officer and given instruction in radar and the relaying of its data for the direction of fighter planes. He later said "It was suggested that this would be excellent work for me with my strong actor's voice". After his training at Yeovilton he was appointed Fighter Direction Officer on board the aircraft carrier Illustrious. Shortly after the departure of his superior, he was promoted to lieutenant-commander, a rank which he held for two years. Alongside his naval responsibilities, he was also appointed as the ship's entertainment officer and was responsible for organising shows featuring members of the crew. He was later appointed to the Admiralty to serve in the office of Naval Assistant to the Second Sea Lord, responsible for appointing Fighter Direction Officers. Also in the office was fellow actor Kenneth More.

=== Marriage and post-war years ===
During a short visit to Liverpool in 1943, Hordern proposed to Eve; they married on 27 April of that year with the actor Cyril Luckham as best man. After the honeymoon, Hordern resumed his duties on Illustrious while Eve returned to repertory theatre in Southport. During his time in the Admiralty Hordern and his wife rented a flat in Elvaston Place in Kensington, London, and he began to seek work as an actor. After a short while, he was approached by André Obey who cast him in his first television role, Noah, in a play adapted from the book of the same name. Hordern was apprehensive about performing in the new medium and found the rehearsal and live performance to be exhausting; but he was generously paid, earning £45 (equivalent to £1,774 in 2025) for the entire engagement.

Hordern's first role in 1946 came as Torvald Helmar in A Doll's House at the Intimate Theatre in Palmers Green. This was followed by the part of Richard Fenton, a murder victim, in Dear Murderer which premiered at the Aldwych Theatre on 31 July. The play was a success and ran for 85 performances until its closure on 12 October. Dear Murderer thrilled the critics and Hordern was singled out by one reporter for the Hull Daily Mail who thought that the actor brought "sincerity to a difficult role". The following month Eve gave birth to the couple's only child, a daughter, Joanna, who was born at Queen Charlotte's Hospital in Chelsea. (Note: Joanna married Fritz Curzon, the son of the concert pianist Sir Clifford Curzon in 1982. They had a son, Nicholas, on 5 September 1983, followed by a daughter, Eve Maria, in June 1986.) That Christmas he took the role of Nick Bottom in a festive reworking of Henry Purcell's The Fairy-Queen. The play was the first performance by the Covent Garden Opera Company, which later became known as The Royal Opera.

Towards the end of April 1947, Hordern accepted the small part of Captain Hoyle in Richard Llewellyn's comic drama film Noose. Two other roles occurred that year: as Maxim de Winter in a television adaption of Daphne du Maurier's novel Rebecca, followed by the part of a detective in Good-Time Girl, alongside Dennis Price and Jean Kent. The following year he took part in three plays: Peter Ustinov's The Indifferent Shepherd, which appeared at the newly opened Q Theatre in Brentford, West London; Ibsen's Ghosts; and an adaptation of The Wind in the Willows at the Shakespeare Memorial Theatre in Stratford-upon-Avon in which he portrayed the part of the blustery, eccentric Mr Toad. (Note: The rest of the cast comprised Michael Gwynn as Badger, William Squire as Ratty, Andrew Faulds as Chief Weasel, and Michael Bates as Chief Ferret.)

In early 1949 Hordern appeared as Pascal in the Michael Redgrave-directed comedy A Woman in Love, but disliked the experience because of the hostile relationship between Redgrave and the show's star, Margaret Rawlings. Next, he was engaged in the minor role of Bashford in the critically acclaimed Ealing comedy Passport to Pimlico, a performance which he described as "tense and hyperactive".

=== 1950–1960s ===
==== Ivanov and Saint's Day ====
By the 1950s Hordern had come to the notice of many influential directors. In his autobiography, the actor recognised the decade as being an important era of his career. It started with a major role in Anton Chekhov's Ivanov in 1950. The production took place at the Arts Theatre in Cambridge and excited audiences because of its 25-year absence from the English stage. The writer T. C. Worsley was impressed by Hordern's performance and wrote: "Perhaps an actor with star quality might have imposed on us more successfully than Mr Michael Hordern, and won our sympathy for Ivanov by his own personality. But such a performance would have raised the level of expectation all round. As it is, Mr Hordern is rich in intelligence, sensitivity and grasp, and with very few exceptions, the company give his impressive playing the right kind of support." The title character in Macbeth, directed by Alec Clunes, was Hordern's next engagement. Critics wrote of their dislike of Clunes's version, but the theatre reviewer Audrey Williamson singled out Hordern's performance as being "deeply moving".

The dramatist John Whiting, trying to make a name for himself in the theatre after the war, was called by Clunes to take part in a theatrical competition at the Arts Theatre in London in 1951, for which he entered his play Saint's Day. Several other amateur directors also competed for the prize, which was to have their play funded and professionally displayed at the Arts. Having seen him perform the previous year, Whiting hired Hordern for the lead role of Paul Southman, a cantankerous old poet who fights off three rebellious army deserters who threaten the tranquillity of his sleepy country village. The play proved popular with audiences, but not so with theatrical commentators. Hordern liked the piece, calling it "bitter and interesting", but the press, who extensively reported on the competition throughout each stage, thought differently and condemned it for winning. This infuriated the actors Laurence Olivier and John Gielgud, who wrote letters of complaint to the press.

==== Shakespeare Memorial Theatre ====
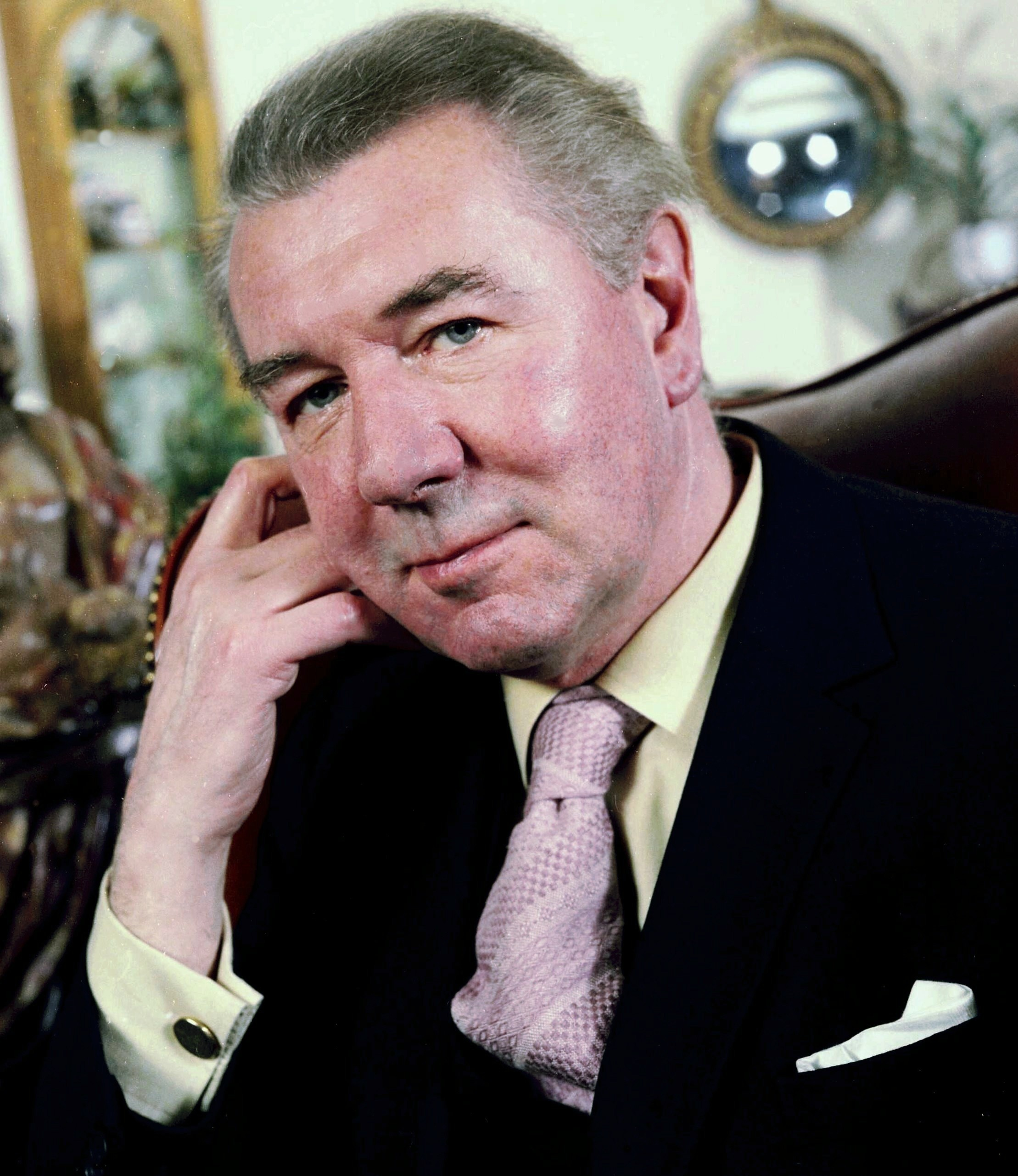
Michael Redgrave, who supported Hordern financially when he was a jobbing actor

Hordern cited Saint's Day's negative publicity as having done his career "the power of good" as it brought him to the attention of the director Glen Byam Shaw, who cast him in a series of plays at the Shakespeare Memorial Theatre in 1951. Among the roles were Caliban in The Tempest, Jaques in As You Like It, and Sir Politick Would-Be in Ben Jonson's comedy Volpone. Hordern claimed to know very little about the bard's works and sought advice from friends about how best to prepare for the roles. The same year, he travelled down to Nettlefold Studios, Walton-on-Thames, to film Scrooge, an adaptation of Charles Dickens's A Christmas Carol, in which he played Marley's ghost. Reviews were mixed with The New York Times giving it a favourable write-up, while Time magazine remained ambivalent. The Aberdeen Evening Express echoed the comments made by an American reviewer by calling Scrooge a "trenchant and inspiring Christmas show". The author Fred Guida, writing in his book Christmas Carol and Its Adaptations: A Critical Examination in 2000, thought that Marley's ghost, though a "small but pivotal role", was "brilliantly played" by Hordern.

With the first play of the season imminent, the Horderns moved to Stratford and took temporary accommodation at Goldicote House, (Note: Goldicote House was the former residence of Claud Berkeley Portman, 4th Viscount Portman (1864–1929), a member of the distinguished Portman family.) a large country property situated on the River Avon. The first of his two plays, The Tempest, caused Hordern to doubt his own acting ability when he compared his interpretation of Caliban to that of Alec Guinness, who had played the same role four years earlier. Reassured by Byam Shaw, Hordern remained in the role for the entire run. A few days later, the actor was thrilled to receive a letter of appreciation from Michael Redgrave, who thought Hordern's Caliban was "immensely fine, with all the pity and pathos ... but with real terror and humour as well". More praise was received as the season continued; an anonymous theatre reviewer, quoted in Hordern's autobiography, called the actor's portrayal of Menenius Agrippa "a dryly acute study of the 'humorous patrician' and one moreover that can move our compassion in the Volscian cameo", before going on to say "we had felt that it would be long before Alec Guinness's Menenius could be matched. The fact that Michael Hordern's different reading can now stand beside the other does credit to a player who will be a Stratford prize."

==== The Old Vic ====
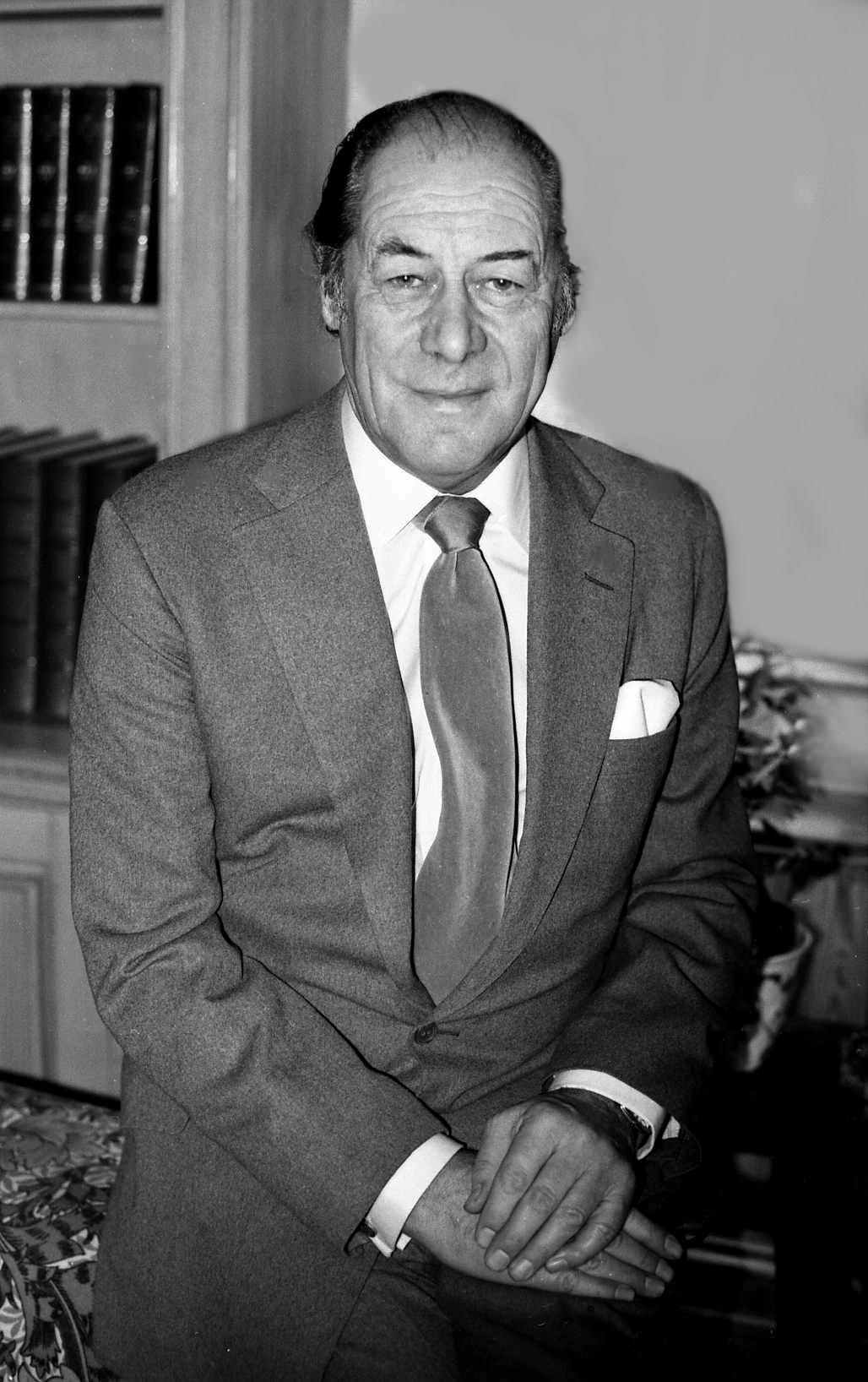
Rex Harrison, whom Hordern despised as a person but admired as an actor

Hordern's contract at the Shakespeare Memorial Theatre lasted until mid-1952, and on its expiration, he secured a position within Michael Benthall's theatrical company at the Old Vic in London. (Note: The 1952 company featured Laurence Harvey, Ralph Richardson, Margaret Leighton, Siobhán McKenna, John Gielgud, George Devine and Mary Ellis. The designers were the Motley Theatre Design Group and Loudon Sainthill. The resident composer was Antony Hopkins.) The company's first play, Hamlet, starred Richard Burton, Claire Bloom, and Fay Compton, and opened on 14 September 1953. (Note: The cast included Richard Burton as Hamlet, Claire Bloom as Ophelia, Fay Compton as Gertrude, William Squire as Horatio, John Neville as Fortinbras, and Clifford Williams as Player Queen.) Hordern called it "the perfect play with which to open the season" as it featured "fine strong parts for everyone and [was] a good showpiece for an actor's latent vanity". Shortly after opening, it was transferred to Edinburgh, where it took part at the Fringe before returning to London. For his role of Polonius, Hordern received mixed reviews, with one critic saying: "He was at his best in his early scenes with Ophelia ... but towards the end of the performance he began to obscure less matter with more art". After Edinburgh, Benthall took Hamlet on a provincial tour and the play had a successful run of 101 performances.

In mid-1953 the Danish government invited Benthall and his company to Helsingør (Elsinore) to perform Hamlet for the Norwegian royal family. The play was well received by the royals. On the whole, the actor enjoyed his time in Hamlet but behind the scenes, relations between him and Burton were strained. Hordern noted his colleague's "likeability, charm and charisma" but thought that Burton had a tendency to get easily "ratty" with him in social situations. Hordern described their working relationship as "love-hate" and admitted they were envious of each other's success; Burton of Hordern because of the latter's good reviews, and Hordern of Burton who received more attention from fans. When Burton left for Hollywood years later, he recommended Hordern to various casting directors; Hordern was subsequently engaged in six of Burton's films. (Note: The films were: Alexander the Great (1956), Cleopatra (1963), The Spy Who Came in from the Cold (1965), The Taming of the Shrew (1967), Where Eagles Dare (1968), and Anne of the Thousand Days (1969).)

King John was next for Benthall's company and opened on 26 October 1953. The lead character initially went to an unknown and inexperienced young actor, but the part was re-cast with Hordern in the role. Hordern described King John as being "a difficult play in the sense that it has no common purpose or apparent theme". Simultaneously to this, he was commuting back to Pinewood Studios where he was filming Forbidden Cargo. The hectic schedule brought on a bout of exhaustion for which he received medical advice to reduce his workload.

==== Theatre Royal, Brighton ====
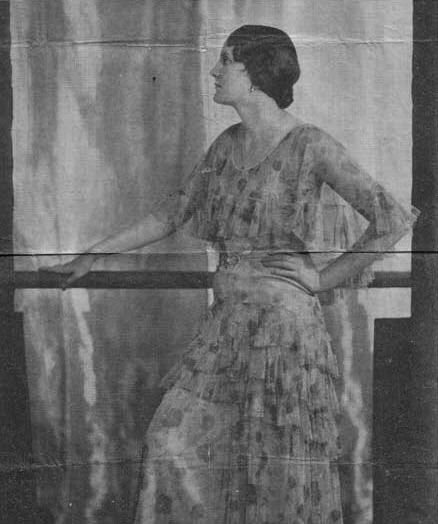
Coral Browne, with whom Hordern had an affair during Nina

In early 1955 Hordern was asked by the British theatre manager and producer Binkie Beaumont to take the lead in André Roussin's comedy Nina, directed by Rex Harrison. The play, which starred Edith Evans, Lockwood West, and James Hayter, transferred from Oxford to the Theatre Royal in Brighton. Beaumont's request came at short notice because Hordern's predecessor had proved inadequate. The play was cursed with bad luck: Evans fell ill and was replaced midway by an understudy who neglected to learn her lines; Harrison frequently upset the cast, which resulted in reduced morale. When Evans did return, she walked off stage and left after seeing empty seats in the front row.

Hordern regretted his decision to take part in Roussin's Nina, but admitted that the allure of appearing alongside Evans had got the better of him. Harrison held auditions to replace his leading lady and settled on the Australian-American actress Coral Browne. Hordern and Browne grew close, aided by their mutual dislike of their disciplinarian director. They fell in love and had an affair which lasted for the duration of the run. Years later Hordern confessed: "I kept falling in love. It is a common complaint among actors. You cannot be at such close quarters, mind and body, without being sorely tempted."

Hordern and Harrison's dislike for one another was evident to the rest of the cast. One night, after a performance of Nina in Eastbourne, and having felt that he had "acted [his] socks off", Hordern, along with the rest of the cast, were berated by Harrison who accused them of producing a piece "not fit for the end of a pier". Nina transferred to the Haymarket Theatre, London, not long after the incident but it was unsuccessful and closed after five weeks. "The play was fine", opined Hordern, "it was a disaster because of Rex Harrison." Hordern and Browne's relationship ended shortly after the play closed and Hordern set about rebuilding his marriage with Eve, who had long known of the affair.

==== Films and 1950s theatre ====
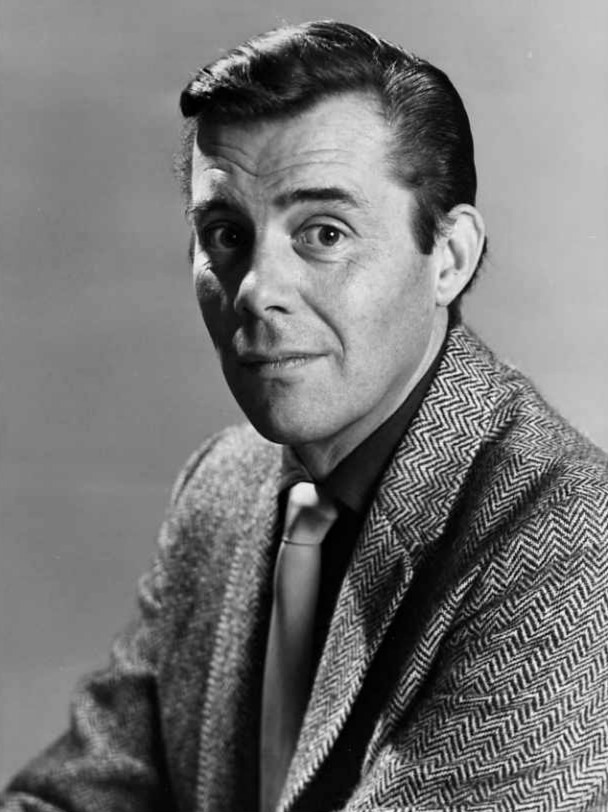
Dirk Bogarde, one of Hordern's many film co-stars during the 1950s

Hordern viewed the 1950s as a good decade to appear in film, although he did not then particularly care for the medium. Writing in 1993 he said: "With cinema one has to leap into battle fully armed. From the start of the film the character has to be pinned down like a butterfly on a board. One does not always get this right, of course, sometimes starting at the beginning of shooting a film on a comedic level that cannot be sustained." He disliked his physical appearance, which he found to be "repulsive", and as a result loathed watching his performances. He preferred radio because the audience only heard his voice, which he then considered his best attribute. Another reason was his recognition of the differences between his sense of personal achievement within a theatre compared to that on a film set: "You get a certain sort of satisfaction in delivering what the director wants of you, but the chances of being emotionally involved are slim." He acknowledged his good ability at learning lines, something which he found to be especially helpful for learning film scripts which frequently changed. He enjoyed the challenge of earning as much value as possible out of a scene and revelled in being able to hit "the right mark for the camera". With the experience of Nina still fresh in his mind, Hordern took a break from the stage and decided to concentrate on his film career.

Hordern was appearing in three to four films a year by 1953 (including a small part as Jacob Marley's ghost in Scrooge, the 1951 film adaptation of Charles Dickens' "A Christmas Carol"), a count that increased as the decade progressed. In 1956 he took a leading part in The Spanish Gardener for which he spent many months filming in southern Spain alongside Dirk Bogarde, Cyril Cusack, and Bernard Lee. The New York Times called Hordern's role of the strict and pompous Harrington Brande "an unsympathetic assignment", but thought the actor did "quite well" in his portrayal. By the mid-1950s Hordern's name was becoming one of reliability and good value; as a result, he was offered a clutch of roles. In 1956 he appeared as Demosthenes in Alexander the Great, and Commander Lindsay in The Night My Number Came Up. He appeared in two other films the following year; the medical drama No Time for Tears, and the thriller Windom's Way. The Second World War was a popular genre for filmmakers during the 1950s. Hordern said the conflict took up a large part of people's lives; "whether it be one of love, loss, nostalgia or tragedy", everybody, according to the actor, had a story to tell and could relate to the situations that were being depicted before them on screen. He found his earlier naval experience to be an asset when cast in many war films, (Note: The war films in which Hordern appeared in the 1950s were: The Man Who Never Was, Pacific Destiny, The Baby and the Battleship, all from 1956, and I Was Monty's Double in 1958. During the 1960s he starred in Sink the Bismarck! (1960), The Spy Who Came in from the Cold (1965), How I Won the War (1967), and Where Eagles Dare (1968).) including The Man Who Never Was, Pacific Destiny, The Baby and the Battleship, all in 1956, and I Was Monty's Double two years later.

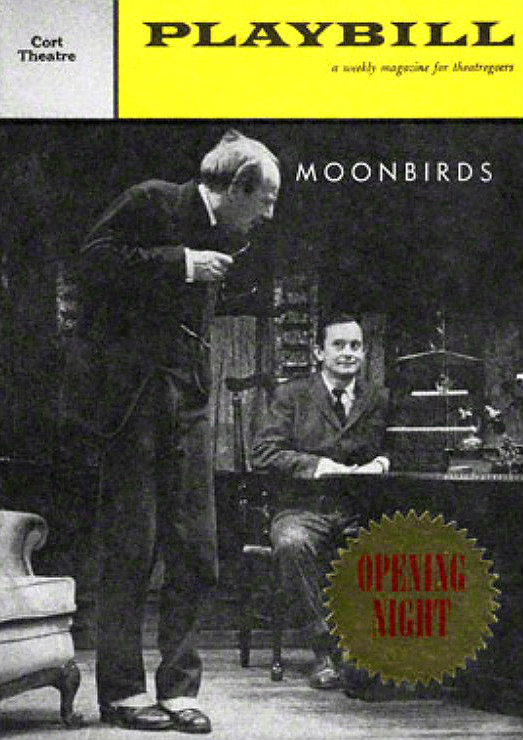
Hordern (left) and Wally Cox on Playbill's front cover for Marcel Aymé's comedy Moonbirds in 1959

Hordern was cast in John Mortimer's 1957 play The Dock Brief in which Hordern played the barrister. The story centres on a failed lawyer who is hired at the last minute to defend a man on a charge of murder. (Note: A dock brief is a defunct legal procedure within a courtroom where a defendant answering a criminal charge without legal representation could, on indictment, choose any barrister within the courtroom who was not directly involved in the case to represent them in exchange for a small fee.) Hordern played the barrister opposite David Kossoff's murder suspect. After some positive comments from the theatrical press, the play transferred to radio in May the same year. It was broadcast on television in September, and earned Hordern a Best Actor Award at the 1958 British Academy Television Awards. The Horderns moved to Donnington, Berkshire in 1958 where they renovated three cottages into one; the property became the family home and is where Hordern and Eve remained until their deaths.

The year 1959 was professionally disastrous for Hordern. He made a return to stage at the Old Vic in Arthur Wing Pinero's The Magistrate in which he played Mr. Posket. The play was not particularly successful and received mixed reviews: According to the author and theatre critic J. P. Wearing, Hordern was miscast, while a reporter for The Stage, thought he gave a "convincing portrayal". Wearing believed that overall the play was not "played briskly enough", while a critic for The Times thought that it had "durable theatrical quality". The role was followed with a part of Pastor Manders in Ghosts opposite Flora Robson. The Sunday Times published an unenthusiastic notice, and thought Hordern's character had "an anxious air" about him. He received equally critical notices when he took to the stage to play the title character in Macbeth, opposite Beatrix Lehmann. The press wrote of Hordern's "unintended comic interpretation" when characterising the evil king: "Half his time on stage he cringed like an American carpet seller in an ankle-length black dressing gown of fuzzy candlewick" thought one reviewer, who went on to say "he would make a sinister Shylock, a frightening Fagin. But this Thane of Cawdor would be unnerved by Banquo's valet, never mind Banquo's ghost."

On 9 October 1959, Hordern made his debut on Broadway at the Cort Theatre in Marcel Aymé's comedy Moonbirds, alongside the comedian Wally Cox. The play was a disaster and closed after only two nights and three performances. Little was offered in the way of praise, although critics singled out Hordern's performance in particular as being good. He was unsure why the play failed, and attributed it to clashes of personality between cast and management.

==== Cleopatra and the 1960s ====
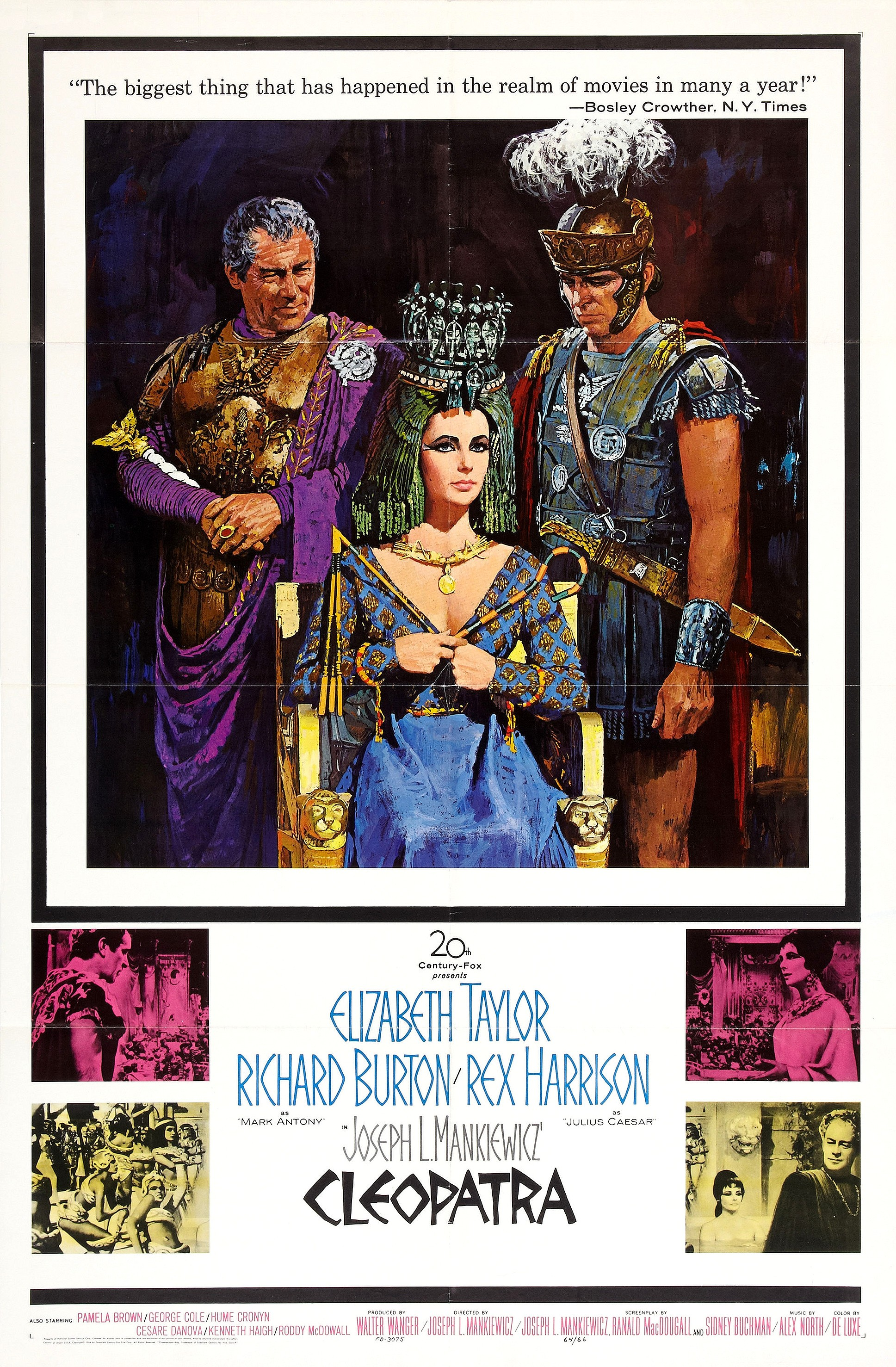
Cleopatra (1963), in which Hordern played the orator and philosopher Cicero

In 1960 Hordern played Admiral Sir John Tovey in the British war film Sink the Bismarck!, based on the book Last Nine Days of the Bismarck by C. S. Forester and with a plot reminiscent of his naval days. With a few smaller roles in between, Hordern started work on the American epic historical drama film Cleopatra. It was made in 1962 and, according to the actor, was "the most extraordinary piece of film-making in which I had the pleasure to take part". He played the Roman orator Cicero and was hired on an eight-week contract which due to various setbacks, including cast sickness and adverse weather conditions, was extended to nine months. (Note: Hordern cited various reasons which held up production: Elizabeth Taylor was taken ill several times during filming; Rex Harrison refused to film scenes unless the producers paid his chauffeur's bill; location filming was often delayed by the bad weather, and financing had to be continually reviewed owing to the frequent problems. Because of this, schedules had to be changed at the last minute, causing scenes to be brought forward. Such was the rush, script changes had to be written on scrap paper which would then often go missing. Because of the quick changes, scenes were often filmed the next day which left little time for performers to learn the revised scripts. Hordern likened the manic experience to being back in repertory theatre as he felt that that too was often unorganised and required the cast to frequently improvise. Filming took so long on Cleopatra that the boy employed to play Caesar's son had grown too tall during production and had to be replaced for continuity reasons.) Much to Hordern's annoyance, the film would require him to work once again with Rex Harrison, who was cast as Caesar. Despite the animosity between them, they agreed to endure each other's company for the sake of the film. The agreement was short-lived; Harrison made a drunken quip at a cast dinner about Nina which prompted Hordern to assault him. The incident almost resulted in Hordern's dismissal, but the matter was quickly resolved by producers and the two were kept separate in between filming. In 1993 Hordern claimed the incident had "cleared the air" between them and they eventually became friends. After Cleopatra's release, Hordern made a return to films, appearing in The Spy Who Came In from the Cold (1965), Khartoum (1966, as Lord Granville), How I Won the War (1967), Where Eagles Dare (1968), and Anne of the Thousand Days (1969, as Thomas Boleyn). He was also featured in the Roman farce A Funny Thing Happened on the Way to the Forum in 1966.

Hordern first met the British theatre director Jonathan Miller in 1968. Miller, who had long been an admirer of Hordern, offered him the part of the agnostic Professor Parkin in his forthcoming television drama "Whistle and I'll Come to You". Hordern, who had heard positive things of Miller from theatrical friends, likewise thought highly of the director, and was quick to take up location filming in Norfolk that year. He came to like Miller's way of working, such as having the freedom to improvise instead of adhering to the strict rules of a script; the actor wrote in his autobiography that he had never experienced that degree of professional freedom. The programme was released towards the end of 1968 and was a hit with audiences and critics. Mark Duguid of the British Film Institute called it "a masterpiece of economical horror that remains every bit as chilling as the day it was first broadcast", while a journalist for The Telegraph, writing in 2010 about that year's remake starring John Hurt, reminded readers of the "brilliant Sixties production by Jonathan Miller [in which] Michael Hordern made a fine, crusty Parkin". The year ended with a role in Peter Hall's production of Edward Albee's A Delicate Balance at the Aldwych Theatre. The piece received lukewarm reviews, with Hilary Spurling of The Spectator thinking Hordern was "ill-served" as the principal character, Tobias.

=== Later career: 1969–1990 ===
==== King Lear ====
Miller and Hordern's collaboration continued into 1969 with King Lear at the Nottingham Playhouse. Hordern immediately accepted the title role but later said that it was a character he never much cared to play. Writing about Miller in his autobiography, Hordern stated: "It was one of the most exhilarating and funny experiences I have had in the theatre." Miller recruited Frank Middlemass to play the fool, but contrary to tradition, Miller made the character an intimate of Lear's as opposed to a servant, something which Shakespearean purists found difficult to accept. (Note: Miller saw Lear and the Fool as equals, despite the fact that Lear was born in a palace and the Fool in a stable. Miller thought of no reason why the two should not be closer as the two characters had "known each other for years".) Miller decided to further defy convention by concentrating on the relationships between the characters rather than adding detail to scenery and costume; he was eager not to use lavish sets and lighting for the fear of detracting from the characterisations and the sentimentality of the storyline. As such, the sets were bleak and the costumes more so; it was a style that was also used when the play was televised by the BBC later that decade.

When King Lear played at the Old Vic in 1970, reviews were mixed; J.W. Lambert thought that the "grey sets" and Hordern's "grizzled" costume were how Shakespeare would have intended them to be, while Eric Shorter thought otherwise, stating "I still do not understand those costumes." Of the performance, the dramatist and critic Martin Esslin called Hordern's portrayal "a magnificent creation" before going on to say: "Hordern's timing of the silences from which snatches of demented wisdom emerge is masterly and illuminates the subterranean processes of his derangement." Writing for The Times later that year, the theatre critic Irving Wardle described Hordern's Lear as a "sharp, peremptory pedant; more a law-giver than a soldier, and (as justice is an old man's profession) still in the prime of his life". Hordern played Lear once more that decade, in 1975, which was televised by the BBC for their series Play of the Month.

==== Jumpers ====
The playwright Tom Stoppard approached Hordern in 1971 with a view to him playing a leading part in the playwright's new play Jumpers, a comic satire based around the field of academic philosophy. Hordern was to play George Moore, a bumbling old philosophy professor, who is employed at a modern university and who, throughout the play, is in constant debate with himself over his moral values. Hordern, though thinking the play was brilliant, disliked the script on the initial read-through as he did not understand its complex situations and strange dialogue. His co-star would be Diana Rigg, who played Moore's wife Dotty, and the entire piece was to be directed by Peter Wood.

Jumpers was scheduled to appear at the National Theatre at the start of 1972, but encountered problems when the theatre's director, Laurence Olivier, called the play "unintelligible" before walking out during the first read-through in disgust. Despite this, rehearsals went ahead, which the cast found difficult; the play featured many scenes, a complicated script, and relied heavily on the opening scene, a sceptical speech about the existence of God which lasted 13 minutes. In his autobiography, Hordern commented: "Each day my fists would sink into my cardigan pockets as I tried to make sense of it all." In a meeting shortly before the opening night, Olivier complained to Stoppard that the play was overlong and, in some parts, laborious. Stoppard agreed to reduce the epilogue by half. The decision angered Hordern as it meant the extra stress of learning a new script at short notice. He vented his frustrations on Wood who agreed to leave his character alone and instead to cut many of the other scenes. The final dress rehearsal also experienced disruption when the revolving stage broke down and had to be fixed half-way through. The problems had ceased by the opening performance the following evening; it was a night which Hordern called "unbelievable, one of the highlights of my career". The actress Maureen Lipman, who was in the audience on the opening night, said that her husband, the playwright Jack Rosenthal, had "laughed so hard he thought he was going to be seriously ill".

The critic Michael Billington, writing in The Guardian, gave a mixed review: "Once or twice one of Stoppard's brightly coloured balls falls to the ground, partly because Michael Hordern's moral philosopher substitutes academic mannerism for apprehension of the argument. But this is not to deny that Hordern's simian habit of scratching his left earlobe with right hand or leaning over his desk as if he is doing intellectual press-ups is very funny to watch or that he is brilliant at displaying cuckolded curiosity." Harold Hobson, the drama critic, thought that failing to enjoy the play was "not actually a criminal offence but it is a sad evidence of illiteracy". Jumpers won the Evening Standard's Best Play Award which, much to Hordern's amusement, was presented by the philosopher A. J. Ayer.

==== Stripwell, and voice work ====
Between 1973 and 1981, Hordern appeared on radio for the BBC as Jeeves in the series What Ho! Jeeves alongside Richard Briers as Bertie Wooster. In 1974, Hordern narrated several other, one-off programmes for the broadcaster, including The Honest Broker, The Last Tsar, and Tell the King the Sky Is Falling. In 1975 Hordern played the judge in Howard Barker's play Stripwell at the Royal Court Theatre. Hordern described the character as "a man wracked by guilt, full of self-doubt and pessimism". It was a role which the actor found to be too close to his own personality for comfort. His time in the play was marred by personal problems; he and Eve had briefly separated and the actor was forced to rent a small flat in Sloane Square from the actor Michael Wilding after being banished from the family home. Hordern and Eve soon reconciled, but it was a time which he was keen to forget, including the play. Critics were complimentary of his performance, with one writing: "Stripwell's ambiguities are therefore viewed half affectionately and half contemptuously and this comes over well in Michael Hordern's portrayal of bumbling, sometimes endearing ineffectiveness, as skilful and accomplished a performance as one would expect from this actor."

Later, in 1975, Hordern narrated Barry Lyndon, Stanley Kubrick's filmed adaptation of William Makepeace Thackeray's novel The Luck of Barry Lyndon. The critic John Riley, writing for the British Film Institute, thought that the actor provided "a witty and ironic foil to the characters' helplessness". The same year Hordern was asked to narrate 30 episodes of the children's animation series Paddington, which was based on the Paddington Bear book series by Michael Bond. In his 1993 autobiography, Hordern wrote of his enjoyment at working on Paddington and that he could not differentiate between his enjoyment in comedy and drama: "it's a bit like difference between roast beef and meringue, both delicious in their way, but there is nothing more satisfying than a thousand people sharing their laughter with you".

==== Return to Stratford-upon-Avon and Jumpers revival ====
In 1976 Hordern joined the RSC in Stratford-upon-Avon, where he appeared as Prospero for Trevor Nunn in The Tempest, an engagement which the actor found to be unpleasant because of his poor relationship with the show's director, Clifford Williams. After that came a short run of Love's Labour's Lost in which he played Don Adriano de Armado opposite Alan Rickman and Zoë Wanamaker. Hordern was the oldest member of the company and found it difficult to adjust to the behaviour and attitudes of some of the younger and less experienced actors. He found it different from the 1950s: non-intimate, characterless, and lacking in morale because management preferred discipline rather than offering guidance and assistance to their young actors. Writing in his 1993 autobiography, Hordern wrote: "Being at Stratford again after all these years was rather like being on a battleship or an aircraft carrier that doesn't often come into harbour. You are at sea for long periods and away from the rest of your service and if the captain of your ship is a good one then the ship is happy; if not, then the commission you serve is very unhappy because you are a long way from land. At Stratford that season I was a long way from land." Later, in 1976, Hordern portrayed the kingly father of the Prince (played by Richard Chamberlain) in the musical film adaptation of Cinderella, The Slipper and the Rose, for which he received a nomination for the BAFTA Award for Best Actor in a Supporting Role, and returned to the role of George in Stoppard's Jumpers at the Lyttelton Theatre. (Note: The Lyttelton Theatre is one of three separate auditoriums which form the Royal National Theatre. It was named after Oliver Lyttelton, the National Theatre's first board chairman. It can accommodate an audience of 890 people.) The theatre critic Kenneth Hurren "enjoyed it immoderately" and thought the revival revealed a "tidier play than it look[ed]". Hordern compared it to the 1972 version by saying: "It is unquestionably a busy little number, and my first impression of the piece, back in 1972, was that it had more decoration than substance, and that the decoration was more chaotic than coherent."

==== Television and radio: 1980–83 ====
In 1981 Hordern played the role of Gandalf in the BBC radio adaptation of Tolkien's The Lord of the Rings. The BBC's budget was generous, and attracted well-known actors from stage and television. The series ran for 26 episodes and was a hit with audiences and critics. The author Ernest Mathijs singled out Hordern in particular as being one of the more powerful characters of the series and his personal favourite, while co-star Ian Holm, writing years later in his autobiography Acting My Life, said he thought Hordern interpreted the role "in a grand, rather old fashioned way". Writing in his autobiography in 1993, Hordern said he found the part of Gandalf to be "a bit of a slog".

Hordern and Jonathan Miller reprised their collaboration in 1982 with a final performance of King Lear for the BBC Television Shakespeare production. The actor considered this version to be his best and attributed its success to the fact he was getting older and therefore able to better understand the character. The author Joseph Pearce, writing in 2008, claimed that Hordern played the king "straight up with no gloss" and made a "reliable and workmanlike Lear" who is "forceful when he should be forceful, compassionate when he should be compassionate, [and] sorrowful when he should be sorrowful". Despite the praise, Pearce thought that Hordern's performance in Act 3 "lack[ed] the required fierceness and miss[ed] the mythic quality when compared to some of the bigger names".

In January 1983 Hordern was knighted, an honour which the actor called "a great thrill and [a] surprise to us all". That year he became popular among children as the voice of Badger in the ITV film The Wind in the Willows. A role he reprised in the subsequent 1984-1990 tv series as well as the 1989 hour-long feature A Tale of Two Toads. He then spent the rest of 1983 appearing as Sir Anthony Absolute in The Rivals for Peter Wood at the Royal National Theatre and received excellent notices. He was nominated for an award at that year's Olivier Awards for best comedy performance of the year, but lost out to Griff Rhys Jones. His success on the stage was tinged with private turmoil; Eve was taken ill after she suffered a brain haemorrhage, a condition from which she never fully recuperated. She required constant care but recovered enough to become partially self-sufficient. However, in 1986 she had a fatal heart attack at the couple's London flat. Hordern was devastated and became consumed in self-pity, in part because of his guilt at the extramarital affairs he had had with many of his leading ladies during the marriage.

==== Paradise Postponed and You Never Can Tell ====
In 1986, John Mortimer, a writer whom Hordern respected greatly, engaged the actor in Paradise Postponed, an eleven-part drama which took a year to make and cost in excess of £6 million. Set in rural England, the saga depicts the struggles within British middle-class society during the post-war years. In his autobiography, Hordern described himself as "a man of prejudice rather than principle" and as such, had very little in common with his character, the left-wing, Marxist-loving vicar, Simeon Simcox. Despite the political differences, Hordern felt great empathy towards his character, and admired his "plain, straightforward attitude to life, his dottiness, and the way he hung to his faith in a wicked world with a saintliness verging on the simple". (Note: The cast included David Threlfall, Richard Vernon, Annette Crosbie, Jill Bennett, Colin Blakely, Zoë Wanamaker, Peter Egan, and Paul Shelley.)

Hordern made a return to the London stage in 1987 after a four-year absence. The play in which he starred, You Never Can Tell, transferred to the Haymarket Theatre that December having made its debut at the Theatr Clwyd in Wales earlier that year. It was the second time the actor had appeared in the play, the first being back in Bristol fifty years previously when he starred as the youthful lead, Valentine. This time he was cast as William, the elderly waiter, a part which he considered to be "a real hell to play", partly because of the many meals he had to serve up on stage, whilst at the same time trying to remember the complex script. He enjoyed the play immensely and was thrilled at its successful run. His engagement also gave him a chance to reunite with some old friends, including Irene Worth, Michael Denison and Frank Middlemass, all of whom were in the cast. Hordern admitted that, on the whole, the experience made him feel "a little happier" about life.

=== Final years and death ===
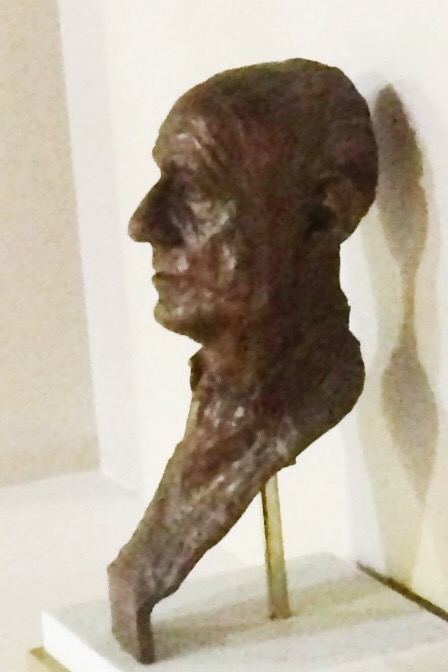
Bronze bust and memorial plaque of Hordern in "The Hordern Room" at Brighton College

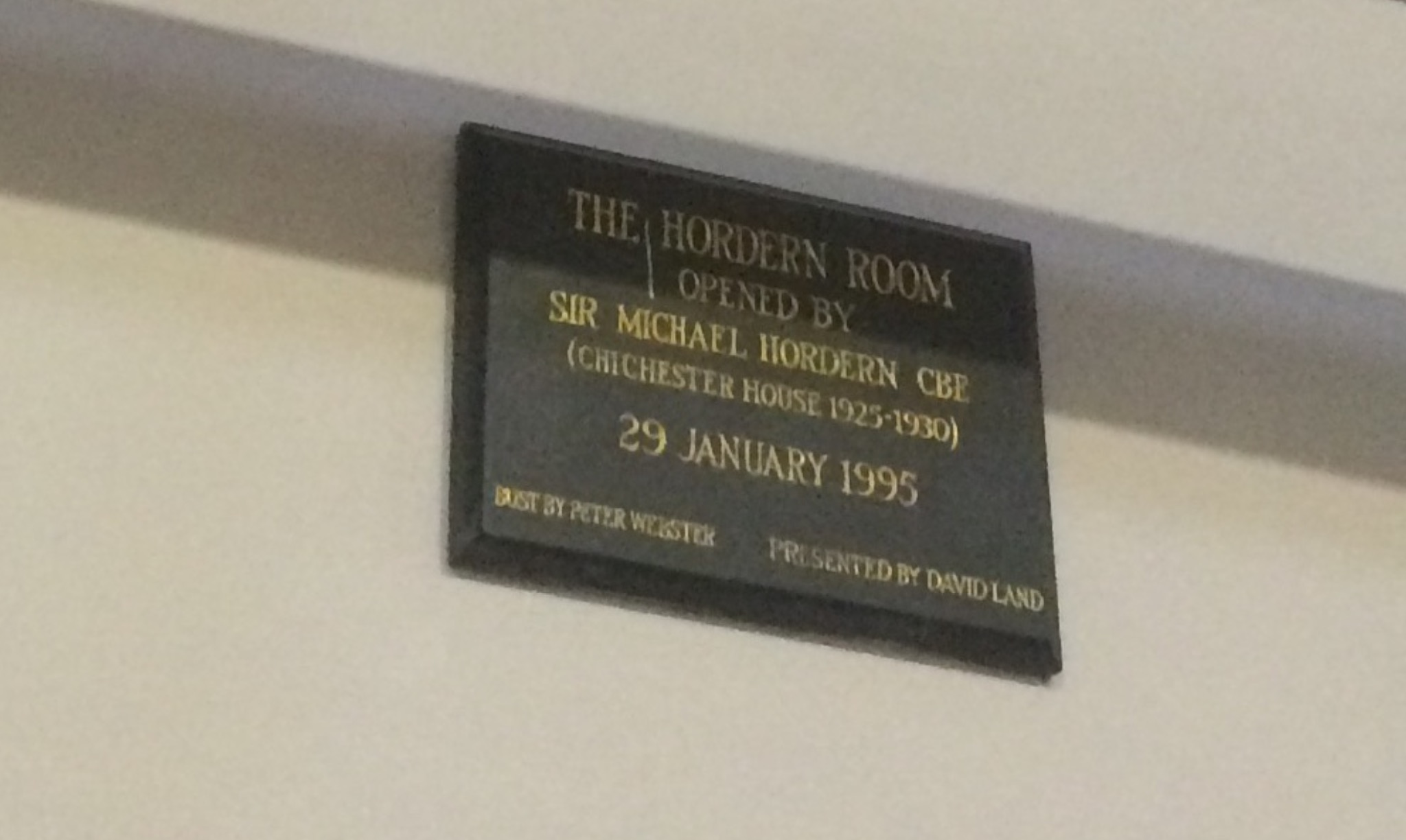

By the early 1990s Hordern was concentrating more on television. His roles were mostly those of ageing teachers, bank managers, politicians and clergymen. In 1989 he appeared alongside John Mills in an adaptation of Kingsley Amis's Ending Up, a tale about a group of pensioners growing old together in a residential home. After that he took the part of Godfrey Colston in Memento Mori, a television film about a group of elderly friends succumbing to old age, which was adapted for television from the Muriel Spark novel of the same name. The film received excellent notices and Hordern's performance was described as outstanding by the critic Neil Sinyard. All that was required of Hordern in his next role, the wealthy but terminally ill landowner Peter Featherstone in the BBC adaptation Middlemarch, was for him simply to lie in bed and pretend to die. It was the kind of role which he found to be most fitting for someone of his advanced years and confirmed to him that the older he got, the more typecast he became. It was a situation that did not altogether bother him as he felt grateful for being employable at the age of 81.

In January 1995 Hordern was invited back to his old college in Brighton, where a room was named in his honour. Inside, the college had commissioned the sculptor Peter Webster to create a bronze bust of the actor which is displayed with a plaque. Hordern's last physical acting role came shortly afterwards as Lord Langland in the comedy film A Very Open Prison. This was followed by two narration performances, firstly in Spode A History of Excellence, and then in the five-part film Dinosaurs and Their Living Relatives.

Hordern died of kidney disease at the Churchill Hospital, Oxford, on 2 May 1995, aged 83. Medical staff confirmed that he had been suffering from "a long illness and had been receiving dialysis treatment".

== Approach to acting ==
Hordern was a self-confessed "lazy bugger" when it came to role preparation. He did not regret his lack of formal acting training, and attributed his abilities to watching and learning from other actors and directors. He said: "I am bored of the intellectual view of the theatre. Actually, it scares the shit out of me, my view being that an actor should learn the lines without too much cerebral interference." In 1951, he asked Byam Shaw how best to rehearse unfamiliar roles. The director advised him to "never read up on them" before going on to say "read the plays as much as [you like] but never read the commentators or critics". It was advice which Hordern adopted for the role of King Lear, and for the rest of his career. The critic Brian McFarlane, writing for the British Film Institute, said that Hordern, despite his relaxed attitude, "had one of the most productive careers of any 20th century British actor".

After all the great parts I have played in my career, Prospero, Lear, Sir Anthony Absolute, George in Jumpers, after all the accolades, the CBE, knighthood, honorary degrees, mixing with the great and the good, I was brought down to earth recently by a small boy whom I had noticed having an intense argument with two other small boys outside my phone box. I seemed to be the centre of discussion. When I stepped out of the box, one of the boys came up to me, looked up earnestly, and very politely asked, 'Excuse me, aren't you Paddington?' I felt gratified.

— Michael Hordern, A World Elsewhere

Throughout his 1993 autobiography A World Elsewhere, Hordern exhibited his pride on being able to play a wide range of parts, something which made him a frequent subject among theatrical critics. The author Martin Banham thought that many of Hordern's characters shared a general identity of "an absent-minded, good-hearted English eccentric". The American journalist Mel Gussow, writing Hordern's obituary in The New York Times in 1995, described him as "a classical actor with the soul of a clown". The actors John Hurt and Michael Bryant considered Hordern "the Austin Princess among British actors", which implied to the author Sheridan Morley that Hordern possessed an element of "reliability but [with] a faint lack of charisma". Morley, who wrote Hordern's biography for the Oxford Dictionary of National Biography, went on to describe the actor as being "one of the great eccentrics of his profession, perched perilously somewhere half way between Alastair Sim and Alec Guinness".

== Notes and references ==
Notes

== Sources ==
- Banham, Martin (1995). The Cambridge Guide to Theatre. Cambridge: Cambridge University Press. ISBN 978-0-521-26595-9.
- Croall, Jonathan (2015). Performing King Lear: Gielgud to Russell Beale. London: Bloomsbury Publishing. ISBN 978-1-4742-2387-4.
- Davies, Peter (2012). The Man Behind the Bridge: Colonel Toosey and the River Kwai. London: Bloomsbury Publishing. ISBN 978-1-78093-960-5.
- Guida, Fred (2000). Christmas Carol and Its Adaptations: A Critical Examination. North Carolina: McFarland and Co. ISBN 978-0-7864-0738-5.
- Herbert, Ian (1978). Who's Who in the Theatre: a Biographical Record of the Contemporary Stage. London: Pitman Publishing. ISBN 978-0-273-01195-8.
- Hischak, Thomas S. (2009). Broadway Plays and Musicals: Descriptions and Essential Facts of More Than 14,000 shows through 2007. North Carolina: McFarland & Company. ISBN 978-0-7864-3448-0.
- Holm, Ian (2004). Acting My Life. London: Bantam Press. ISBN 978-0-552-15107-8.
- Hordern, Michael (1993). A World Elsewhere. London: Michael O'Mara Books Ltd. ISBN 978-1-85479-188-7.
- Mathijs, Ernest (2006). The Lord of the Rings: Popular Culture in Global Context. San Francisco: Wallflower Press. ISBN 978-1-904764-82-3.
- Pearce, Joseph (2008). The Tragedy of King Lear: With Classic and Contemporary Criticisms. San Francisco: IgnatiusPress. ISBN 978-1-58617-137-7.
- Wearing, J. P. (2014). The London Stage 1940–1949: A Calendar of Productions, Performers, and Personnel. London: Rowman & Littlefield Education. ISBN 978-0-8108-9306-1.
- Wearing, J. P. (2014). The London Stage 1950–1959: A Calendar of Productions, Performers, and Personnel. London: Rowman & Littlefield Education. ISBN 978-0-8108-9307-8.
- Wells, Stanley (1986). Shakespeare Survey: Volume 39. Cambridge: Cambridge University Press. ISBN 978-0-521-32757-2.
- Willis, Susan (1991). The BBC Shakespeare Plays: Making the Televised Canon. Chapel Hill: University of North Carolina Press. ISBN 978-0-8078-4317-8.
