= Jackie Cockle =

British animator, producer, and director

- Born: Portsmouth, Hampshire, England
- Occupation: Animation specialist
- Years active: 1970s–present
- Known for: Co-founder of HOT Animation

Jackie Cockle is a British animator, producer, and director, best known as the co-founder of the stop motion animation studio HOT Animation. She is the creator and creative producer of the pre-school animation Timmy Time, creative producer of Bob the Builder and Brambly Hedge, director of The Wind in the Willows and more. Cockle, a graduate of the Manchester College of Art and Design, has won 3 BAFTA awards: one in the best animation category for Bob the Builder 30 minute special (2002), and two in the pre-school animation for Timmy Time (2010, 2013) - a production of the Bristol-based Aardman Animations.

== Career history ==
Jackie Cockle has participated in many stop frame productions during her 40-year-long career. In 1976, she became a part of Cosgrove Hall Films, where she produced and directed many shows for over 20 years, including:

- Chorlton and the Wheelies (animator)
- Cinderella (animator)
- Cockleshell Bay (director)
- A Tale of Two Toads (director)
- Oh, Mr. Toad (director)
- The Wind in the Willows (director)
- Truckers
- Noddy's Toyland Adventures (BBC)
- Oakie Doke
- Brambly Hedge
- Animal Shelf
- Rocky and the Dodos

In 1998, Cockle co-established HOT Animation as a subsidiary of HIT Entertainment, where she produced 210 10-minute episodes and 8 45-minute specials of Bob the Builder. In addition, from 1998 to 2006, she produced and was the supervising director of episodes 5-8 of Brambly Hedge, Rubbadubbers, and Pingu.
