= List of Men Behaving Badly episodes =

Men Behaving Badly is a British sitcom that was created and written by Simon Nye. It was first broadcast on ITV in 1992, moving to BBC1 from 1994 to 1998. A total of six series were made, along with a Christmas special, and three final episodes that make up the feature-length "last orders".

Each episode follows the lives of flatmates Gary Strang (Martin Clunes) and Tony Smart (Neil Morrissey) - except series 1, in which Dermot Povey (Harry Enfield) is Gary's flatmate. The other major characters are Gary's girlfriend Dorothy Bishop (Caroline Quentin) and the occupant of the flat above, later Tony's girlfriend, Deborah Burton (Leslie Ash).

== Series overview ==
Series	Episodes	Originally released		
Series	Episodes	First released	Last released	Network
1	6	18 February 1992	24 March 1992	ITV
2	6	8 September 1992	13 October 1992	ITV
3	6	1 July 1994	5 August 1994	BBC One
4	7	25 May 1995	13 July 1995	BBC One
5	7	20 June 1996	1 August 1996	BBC One
6	6	6 November 1997	11 December 1997	BBC One
Christmas Special		25 December 1997		BBC One
Last Orders	3	25 December 1998	28 December 1998	BBC One

== Episodes ==
=== Series 1 (1992) ===
No. overall	No. in series	Title	Directed by	Written by	Original release date
1	1	"Intruders"	Martin Dennis	Simon Nye	18 February 1992
Dermot owes rent to Gary but has spent the money on a new suit. The pair fear who will be moving into the newly vacant flat above them. Such fears are dashed when it turns out to be a slim, attractive blonde woman named Deborah. She has bought it and will be living there alone.
2	2	"The Bet"	Martin Dennis	Simon Nye	25 February 1992
Gary has promised to take Dorothy to the opera, but Dermot has made the same promise to Deborah. Unfortunately there are only two tickets, hence the pair play a game of chess to win them, with Gary winning. Dermot tells Deborah that his wallet containing the tickets has been stolen. Gary takes Dorothy, but they cannot get in because the tickets are forgeries.
3	3	"Alarms and Setbacks"	Martin Dennis	Simon Nye	3 March 1992
Gary has a new alarm system installed in the flat, leading to a power cut. But it is not just the alarm system that has gone haywire, so has Gary and Dorothy's relationship.
4	4	"Animals"	Martin Dennis	Simon Nye	10 March 1992
Gary and Dorothy are about to split up, but instead agree to have an open relationship. Dermot starts a new job in marketing where he meets the sister of an ex-girlfriend.
5	5	"Sex and Violence"	Martin Dennis	Simon Nye	17 March 1992
Dermot lures Deborah into having a meal with him at the flat, but the hired organist is a disappointment. Sabotaging the evening further, Deborah's boyfriend Mike returns from Singapore after having sex with other women there, and headbutts Gary. Dorothy tells Gary that she has split from her boyfriend Graham.
6	6	"My Brilliant Career"	Martin Dennis	Simon Nye	24 March 1992
Dermot tells Deborah that he has been sacked for assaulting a child customer at work. He gets a job as a waiter at Deborah's restaurant. Gary intends to change employers. He dreads telling George and Anthea that they are going to lose their jobs. During a meal with Anthea, George and Dorothy, celebrating Anthea's birthday at Deborah's restaurant, Gary intends to tell them the bad news. However, after Dermot informs Gary that Gary's prospective employer is not going to recruit him, he no longer needs to tell them. Dermot is dismissed for kissing a customer in front of her boyfriend.

=== Series 2 (1992) ===
No. overall	No. in series	Title	Directed by	Written by	Original release date
7	1	"Gary and Tony"	Martin Dennis	Simon Nye	8 September 1992
Gary receives a postcard from Dermot saying he will not be returning home after finding love abroad. Gary advertises for a new flatmate. He is very disappointed with the prospective flatmates whom he interviews; he chooses record seller Tony Smart (Neil Morrissey).
8	2	"Rent Boy"	Martin Dennis	Simon Nye	15 September 1992
Gary is disappointed at evidence suggesting that Tony is gay. He visits Tony at his workplace, where he finds out that he is less successful than he claimed and runs a second-hand record store. Dorothy asks Tony if he is gay, and Tony says he is not. Tony pretends he speaks German in order to translate a letter for Deborah from a customer at her restaurant. Tony gives an unconvincing fake translation, after which Dorothy, who studied German at A level, translates it properly.
9	3	"How to Dump Your Girlfriend"	Martin Dennis	Simon Nye	22 September 1992
Tony is unhappy in his current relationship, and Gary turns on his domestic persona and creates a new cleaning rota for the flat.
10	4	"Troublesome Twelve Inch"	Martin Dennis	Simon Nye	29 September 1992
When Gary discovers that one of Dorothy's records is rare, he sells it to Tony at his record store. However, when Dorothy begins to question her record's whereabouts, Gary quickly creates a web of lies to cover up the truth. Meanwhile, Tony takes Deborah on a date.
11	5	"Going Nowhere"	Martin Dennis	Simon Nye	6 October 1992
Dorothy, Gary, Tony and Deborah go out shopping. Dorothy contemplates splitting up with Gary, who is trapped in a lift with the career-troubled Deborah. Tony's newly found happiness, a rusty old van, is also going nowhere.
12	6	"People Behaving Irritatingly"	Martin Dennis	Simon Nye	13 October 1992
Tony's annoying brother and girlfriend are commandeering Gary's flat, whose tolerance is wearing thin. However the foursome's attitude soon changes when they discover a free holiday is on offer, courtesy of the irritating couple.

=== Series 3 (1994) ===
No. overall	No. in series	Title	Directed by	Written by	Original release date
13	1	"Lovers"	Martin Dennis	Simon Nye	1 July 1994
Gary feels sexually inferior to Tony, when stumbling onto the subject of how many women the pair have each had sex with. Gary has only had sex with three women but claims that he has had sex with fifty, and sets out to fake proof of his supposedly many ex-lovers to an unconvinced Dorothy and Tony.
14	2	"Bed"	Martin Dennis	Simon Nye	8 July 1994
The broken fence is blowing in a strong wind, preventing the foursome from sleeping, and a stomach ache is paining Dorothy. In the middle of the night, Deborah tells Tony to fix the fence; he tries repeatedly until giving up. Gary goes to an all-night chemist to get some indigestion tablets for Dorothy, but cannot buy it because he forgot to take his wallet.
15	3	"Casualties"	Martin Dennis	Simon Nye	15 July 1994
Gary has got into the habit of persistently lying; hence when George is injured in the office and Gary is to blame, he attempts to cover the fact up so that Dorothy does not find out the truth behind the accident. Deborah has lost her job and decides to sell her flat and travel through Asia. She changes her mind after finding a new job.
16	4	"Weekend"	Martin Dennis	Simon Nye	22 July 1994
Gary and Dorothy go on a romantic weekend together, while Tony is left to fend for himself at the flat. Simultaneously, he is lost in thought over Deborah, who now has a new boyfriend, arrogant estate agent Ray.
17	5	"Cleaning Lady"	Martin Dennis	Simon Nye	29 July 1994
Gary becomes obsessed with the attractive young Portuguese cleaning lady Elena whom they have hired. Tony has found a modelling job and intends to make Deborah jealous by pretending that Elena is his girlfriend.
18	6	"Marriage"	Martin Dennis	Simon Nye	5 August 1994
A drunk Gary proposes to Dorothy, which he regrets the next morning. Tony is jealous of Deborah's new relationship and sets up a bugging device to listen in on the couple.

=== Series 4 (1995) ===
No. overall	No. in series	Title	Directed by	Written by	Original release date
19	1	"Babies"	Martin Dennis	Simon Nye	25 May 1995
Gary had a nightmare about marrying Dorothy and both of them being pregnant. Dorothy considers having a baby with Gary, but quickly realises it is a bad idea due to his immaturity. Deborah asks Tony to look after her flat whilst she is away. Unable to resist snooping around, he accidentally spills orange juice into her underwear drawer after reading her diaries, which angers her.
20	2	"Infidelity"	Martin Dennis	Simon Nye	1 June 1995
Deborah is engrossed in a drama programme on TV which Tony finds boring. After he fails to divert her attention onto himself, she loses patience and says that although she finds him attractive, his selfishness and immaturity will always prevent them being a couple. Tony fails in his attempt to entertain residents at the local old people's home to show Deborah he is not selfish, and she tells him it is pointless as she is already seeing someone anyway. Gary suspects that Dorothy is having an affair. He asks Dorothy outright upon her arrival at the flat, a question she does not fully answer. He decides to play detective in order to find out Dorothy's whereabouts and uses a disguise (a sombrero) and a red Nissan Micra which he sits in outside Dorothy's parents' house to keep watch on visitors. She later tells him that she is enjoying an affair with a radiographer colleague, Jamie, and leaves him.
21	3	"Pornography"	Martin Dennis	Simon Nye	8 June 1995
Gary is not coping well with Dorothy splitting up with him. When he learns that she and Jamie are attending a dinner party hosted by Deborah and her new boyfriend, he gets really bitter and decides to hold his own. Tony is also enjoying a new relationship; however, his girlfriend is disgusted by his collection of pornographic magazines. He promises to get rid of them, which is easier said than done.
22	4	"Three Girlfriends"	Martin Dennis	Simon Nye	22 June 1995
Dorothy is now engaged to Jamie and invites Gary to their engagement party. Determined to show Dorothy he is over her, he tries desperately to find someone to go with while at the same time dealing with his embarrassing father who has arrived for a visit. Tony discovers that juggling three girlfriends at once is not worth the effort and tries to work out which of them to dump. Dorothy later returns to the flat, having been dumped by Jamie.
23	5	"Drunk"	Martin Dennis	Simon Nye	29 June 1995
Gary and Dorothy are back together, and they plan to celebrate with a romantic dinner. As Dorothy heads home from the pub to cook it, Gary promises to be home in a few minutes, but finds the pull of the pub is enough to keep him there all night.
24	6	"In Bed with Dorothy"	Martin Dennis	Simon Nye	6 July 1995
Dorothy has had her appendix out, but Gary's attempts at taking care of her seem to be having the opposite effect. Tony is embarrassed with the glasses he has to wear and is determined the others will not find out that he has to wear them.
25	7	"Playing Away"	Martin Dennis	Simon Nye	13 July 1995
Tony resorts to extreme measures when attempting to remove his tooth without having to see a dentist. Gary and Deborah are away on a creative writing course where he tries encouraging her to sleep with him. Tony and Dorothy get drunk and have sex and are discovered in bed together by Gary on his return.

=== Series 5 (1996) ===
No. overall	No. in series	Title	Directed by	Written by	Original release date
26	1	"Hair"	Martin Dennis	Simon Nye	20 June 1996
Tony has spent the last few months travelling around Europe, and Dorothy has moved in with Gary while he was gone. Gary has matured away from Tony's influence, although it does not take long for him to revert when Tony returns complete with a beard. Deborah, still jobless, is feeling miserable, which is not helped by Tony's return.
27	2	"The Good Pub Guide"	Martin Dennis	Simon Nye	27 June 1996
Gary and Tony are both shocked when their much-loved pub, The Crown, is being revamped and landlord Les has been fired. Despite promising never to go there again, they soon do and meet the new landlord, Ken. Dorothy too, has concerns of her own; she confronts Gary about doing all the housework and Tony pretends to share Deborah's interest in astrology to impress her.
28	3	"Cowardice"	Martin Dennis	Simon Nye	4 July 1996
When Gary cowers in fear when he and Dorothy encounter an aggressive motorist, leaving her to deal with him, he desperately wants to prove he can be macho and hires someone he can beat up at the pub. Tony and Gary speculate whether Deborah is in a lesbian relationship with a friend staying with her.
29	4	"Your Mate v Your Bird"	Martin Dennis	Simon Nye	11 July 1996
It is clear that three people living in the flat is not working and Gary is going to have to ask Tony or Dorothy to leave. As he tries to decide which of them to kick out, he starts having nightmares about their reactions. Eventually he decides Tony has to go, only for Dorothy to announce she is leaving the flat to move in with Deborah; Tony hence returns.
30	5	"Cardigan"	Martin Dennis	Simon Nye	18 July 1996
Gary seems to be slipping into middle-age mode and finds he is wearing the same clothes as George. To avoid descending into the crisis of age further, Gary organises a night out to a rave. Deborah is now a mature student and Tony feels rejected, while simultaneously jealous of her new student friends.
31	6	"Rich and Fat"	Martin Dennis	Simon Nye	25 July 1996
Tony reads Gary's bank statement and discovers that he has £33,000 in his account, which those around him develop an appetite for. Tony has gained a rather large appetite of his own, and a fat belly to go with it.
32	7	"Home-Made Sauna"	Martin Dennis	Simon Nye	1 August 1996
Dorothy and Deborah are leaving on a sailing weekend, and Gary decides to chat up his attractive neighbour, only for her to respond to his advances. Tony decides he needs a sauna to attract Deborah (and get her out of her clothes) and builds his own in the shed.

=== Series 6 (1997) ===
No. overall	No. in series	Title	Directed by	Written by	Original release date
33	1	"Stag Night"	Martin Dennis	Simon Nye	6 November 1997
Gary confesses to Dorothy he slept with someone else while she was away. The two decide they need to make their relationship more solid and decide to get married. In yet another attempt to impress Deborah, Tony is helping pregnant women to give birth in water. When Gary and Dorothy both sleep with other people on their respective stag and hen nights, the couple have second thoughts getting married. After Tony helps deliver a baby, Deborah starts to see him in a new light.
34	2	"Wedding"	Martin Dennis	Simon Nye	13 November 1997
Gary and Dorothy are about to get married with Tony the nervous best man. As the event draws closer both Gary and Dorothy realise they are making a mistake, only to be saved when the registrar collapses. They decide not to tell anyone they will not reschedule so they can keep the presents and still venture off into the sunset for their honeymoon. After five long years and an array of desperate efforts, Tony finally gets to have sex with Deborah.
35	3	"Jealousy"	Martin Dennis	Simon Nye	20 November 1997
Lost in happiness and rapt in love, Deborah and Tony are now a couple. In contrast, Dorothy and Gary seem to despise each other. Nevertheless, the group head off for a weekend away in a caravan, where Tony gets jealous of their camping neighbours and Gary attempts to prove to the group that he can instantly stop smoking, leading to hair-tearing chaos.
36	4	"Watching TV"	Martin Dennis	Simon Nye	27 November 1997
The group settle down for a night in front of the TV and discuss a variety of subjects including Star Trek, embarrassing secrets,The Good Life and old theme tunes. The Trek discussion is prompted by the television showing "The City on the Edge of Forever", whose plot and action are commented on. Tony is now constantly happy since he started dating Deborah, leading to the others deciding to play a chain of tricks on him to bring him back down to Earth. Gary orders pizzas with a variety of unusual toppings hoping the delivery will not make it before he gets it for free.
37	5	"Ten"	Martin Dennis	Simon Nye	4 December 1997
Jonathan, Dorothy's ten-year-old nephew, comes to stay, with Gary and Tony soon warming to him when he starts doing chores for them. Gary and Dorothy attempt to save their deteriorating relationship by visiting a counsellor, only for him to advise them to split up. Tony meets Deborah's mother, and despite his best efforts, things go from bad to worse.
38	6	"Sofa"	Martin Dennis	Simon Nye	11 December 1997
Gary loves his dirty, worn-out sofa. However, Dorothy pressures him to dispose of it because of its poor condition. He reminisces about the girls who have sat in it. Tony wakes up after a drunken night out, horrified that he has brought home a live snake which he bought from a man in the pub. Dorothy and Deborah sit on the new sofa, while Gary and Tony take the old sofa and the snake to the Cerne Abbas Giant.

=== Christmas Special (1997) ===
No. overall	No. in series	Title	Directed by	Written by	Original release date
39	Special	"Jingle Balls"	Martin Dennis	Simon Nye	25 December 1997
It is Christmas time, a time of love, food and fun... except at Gary's home as it is a time of hate, burnt turkeys, unwanted presents and deep fat fried phones! Gary is determined to do the cooking, but this inevitably leads to disaster. Tony buys Deborah a mountain of presents, but his immaturity hits a new high with the Christmas season, leading Deborah to decide to split up with him.

=== Last Orders (1998) ===
No. overall	No. in series	Title	Directed by	Written by	Original release date
40	1	"Performance"	Martin Dennis	Simon Nye	25 December 1998
Gary and Dorothy finally decide to try for a baby; however, Gary has a slight impotence problem so collects a heavy collection of pornography to solve the problem. Tony decides to move in with Deborah, however when she injures her leg and Dorothy implies she might lose it, Tony starts to get cold feet.
41	2	"Gary in Love"	Martin Dennis	Simon Nye	26 December 1998
Gary attends a conference in Worthing, and Dorothy, Deborah and Tony tag along for the free trip; Tony and Gary make the local headlines by stealing a large ornamental fish, and Gary falls in love, but not with Dorothy.
42	3	"Delivery"	Martin Dennis	Simon Nye	28 December 1998
Dorothy is heavily pregnant and is having a miserable time, Tony has finally found a stable full-time job as a postman and with it comes a wave of maturity; he grows a moustache, wears glasses and starts taking life seriously. Ironically, Deborah believes he has become boring and starts to miss the irresponsible and stupid man he used to be, eventually deciding to end their relationship. Gary's office is closing down, leaving him, George and Anthea out of a job. Unable to bring himself to deliver the bad news, he gets heavily drunk in order to get the courage. Dorothy tells Tony that Deborah preferred him the way he used to be, so he smashes the glasses and shaves off the moustache, winning her back. Dorothy goes into labour, only for a drunken Gary to accidentally knock out the midwife, leaving Deborah to deliver the baby, whilst Gary and Tony view the birth through a smashed hole in the door, drinking lager.

== Other media ==
Title	Production	Directed by	Written by	Original release date
"Men Behaving Very Badly Indeed"	Comic Relief (1997)	Martin Dennis	Simon Nye	14 March 1997
Australian pop singer Kylie Minogue makes a surprise visit; Gary and Tony fail to recognise her.
"The Naughty Boys"	Comic Relief (1999)	Martin Dennis	Simon Nye	23 March 1999
A "Swinging Sixties" version of the show via recently discovered black-and-white footage.
"Stand Up To Cancer & Feeling Nuts Comedy Night Special"	Feeling Nuts Comedy Night (2014)	Martin Dennis	Simon Nye	17 October 2014
Gary and Tony discuss testicular cancer as part of Channel 4's Stand Up to Cancer telethon and The Feeling Nuts Comedy Night. Dorothy and Deborah are replaced by stuffed dolls with cutouts of their faces, confirming that the couples have split up. This is non-canon to the show.
