= Autumn Story (Brambly Hedge) =

Book by Jill Barklem

- Book cover
- Author: Jill Barklem
- Language: English
- Genre: Children's literature
- Publication date: 1980
- Preceded by: Summer Story (Brambly Hedge)
- Followed by: Winter Story

Autumn Story is a 1980 children's book, the third of the four seasons of Jill Barklem's Brambly Hedge series. In it, the mouse Little Primrose wanders off and finds herself in uncharted territory.
