= Morrissey Fox =

Morrissey Fox is a range of beers developed by actor Neil Morrissey and chef Richard Fox. Development of the original 'Blonde' ale began in January 2008 and was documented in the Channel 4 programme Neil Morrissey's Risky Business.

The line was expanded with several new beers in late 2008, with Fox telling The Publican that the brewer intended to establish themselves as a serious brewery with an established range of products.
