= List of British Cluedo episodes =

This is a list of episodes of the British version of the Cluedo TV series.

== Series ==
=== Series 1 ===
This first series, hosted by James Bellini, set had a blue and white theme with the suspects having to walk down ramp and steps to arrive at their seats with the teams sitting in a high rise area with white triangular desks. In this series, each team is made up of one celebrity and an expert in a field linked to the murder in some way. As well as the Christmas special, there are 300 members of the studio audience to which some are seen in the background risers behind the teams and the suspects and vote halfway during the show to see whom they think the killer was. This is the only series where Rev. Green was the only suspect not to be the killer in any of the episodes while Mrs. Peacock was the killer twice. But this is also the only series where the poison is used as the murder weapon twice and a choice of the murder weapons in all of the episodes. This is also the only series where the dining room is the murder room in some of the episodes. In episodes, suspects' reasons for murder are not present or relevant.

This is the only series where Mrs. White's husband, Mr. White is seen. From the next series onwards, Mrs. White is a widow. Mr. White was never a suspect and he lived with Mrs. White in an annex building next to where Mrs. White worked. He is also only seen with Mrs. White. In such scenes, they called each other "Mr. White" and "Mrs. White", respectively. As a result, Mr. White's first name is never revealed.

Episode	Episode title	Date	Million viewers _{(ITV rank)}	Details	Teams	Weapons	Solution
1	Countdown	25 Jul. 1990	7.72 (21st).	It's the annual fun run in the village of Arlington with the start line at Arlington Grange but for its residents, all is not fun as Mrs. Peacock is newly engaged to the French Count Henri de Beauchamp (Oliver Tobias) and no one is happy including Ms. Scarlett is fearful of losing her inheritance and Rev. Green was not getting any money for the "Save the Mole" campaign but Mrs. White has her suspicions that the count is a fake but who killed the count? Was everyone in the run competing?	Team 1: Actor Edward Hardwicke and Special Constable Karen Beer; Team 2: Author Nanette Newman and pathologist Dr. Mike Hammer	candlestick, poison, pistol, knife, rope, paperweight	Mrs. Peacock, in the dining room, with the poison.
2	Deadly Disco	1 Aug. 1990	7.78 (17th).	The "Stop the disco action group" is meeting at Arlington Grange to convince property developer Mr. Hall (Nicholas Ball) to not build a discothèque on the village pond but Col. Mustard is delayed with a flat tire. With Ms. Scarlett having a possible affair, Prof. Plum feeling guilty over selling Hall the land, Rev. Green and Mrs. White angry to lose the wildlife and Mrs. Peacock protective over her community, who killed Mr. Hall?	Team 1: TV presenter John Stalker and Professional Corpse Judy Roberts; Team 2: Actress Anna Carteret and neural scientist Dr. David Weeks	spanner, shotgun, poison, knife, curtain tie-back, statuette	Col. Mustard, in the dining room, with the statuette.
3	A Bridge Too Far	8 Aug. 1990	7.76 (21st).	After winning the annual bridge competition for the third year in a row, Professor Plum is over with Ms. Scarlett and Mrs. Peacock's winning streak so he hires some hustlers, Mr & Mrs. Hope (Paul Darrow and Joanna van Gyseghem), to beat them at their own game but when the hustlers take things too far, Mrs. Hope ends up dead. Did Professor Plum want to stop what he started? Did Ms. Scarlett and Mrs. Peacock not want to pay their debts? Or Did Mrs. White wants to save her job?	Team 1: Theatre and TV presenter Ned Sherrin and Private Detective Zena Scott-Archer; Team 2: Actress Thelma Barlow and Financial Investigator Clive Fisk	bridge trophy, shotgun, poison, steak knife, billiard cue, curtain tie-back	Ms. Scarlett, in the study, with her bridge trophy.
4	Going, Going, Goner	15 Aug. 1990	9.25 (17th).	Mrs. Peacock invites TV and Art critic Peregrine Talbot-Wheeler (Nickolas Grace) to Arlington Grange so he could evaluate some valuable artifacts, but what he finds, is making enemies with the guests at the grange as blackmail is on foot but who killed the critic?	Team 1: Actor Andrew Sachs and Legal Executive Dee Williamson; Team 2: Actor Keith Barron and Welsh Cluedo champion Harriet Cozen	billiard cue, antique pistol, poison, antique sword, bowtie, paperweight	Mrs. Peacock, in the study, with the antique sword.
5	Politician's Funeral	22 Aug. 1990	(26th).	Mrs. Peacock holds a reception after the funeral of a local MP at Arlington Grange. Col. Mustard and Prof. Plum's boss, Dave Chapman (Simon Williams) want to run for this vacant spot and Mr. Chapman starts to blackmail the guests for votes and even threatens to deport Prof. Plum but who killed Mr. Chapman?	Team 1: Actor Edward Fox and P.I. Bob Kettle. Team 2: Actress Joanna David and P.I. Eileen Kettle	statuette, card sharp's gun, poison, knife, black tie, crook lock	Prof. Plum, in the billiard room, with the black tie.
6	A Fête Worse Than Death	Wednesday, 29 August 1990	(28th).	It is time for the annual summer fête in the village of Arlington and is held at Arlington Grange. While the guest of honour, TV's Bernard Kirkbride (Art Malik) causes anger amongst the guests, it isn't him who is killed but the local policeman PC Jones (Chris Wright), but who did it and why?	Team 1: Actor and Comedian Tony Slattery and Criminologist Coretta Phillips. Team 2: Actor David Yip and policeman Andrew Lovelady	statuette, rifle, poison, cake knife, tail from dragon's costume, hatpin	Mrs. White, with the poison, in the drawing room.

=== Christmas Special ===
This special was an extended edition to 45 minutes with extra evidence. The set was painted from blue to red and the teams' white desks changed to cream and there was a new cream perimeter around the suspects' seating area plus the six weapons used are the actual ones traditionally used in Cluedo. This is the only episode in which the hall is a potential murder location, replacing the billiard room. Both team members were celebrities, one of whom was Leslie Grantham who would go on to portray Colonel Mustard in Series 4.

Episode title	Date	Million viewers _{(ITV rank)}	Details	Teams	Weapons	Solution
Christmas Past, Christmas Present	26 December 1990		It is Christmas at Arlington Grange and a special guest has arrived - Richard Forrest (Sean Pertwee), the son of the famous judge who lived in the Grange before has arrived with gifts for the guests in Arlington Grange, which each gift represented a secret from each of their past from the judge's old diaries. Richard tells Mrs. Peacock that he wants the Grange or the secrets will be exposed but it ends up that it's not Richard that ends up dead but Ken the chauffeur (James Clyde) —or is it him?	Team 1: Actor Tony Scannell and actress Fiona Spence; Team 2: Trudie Goodwin and actor Leslie Grantham	knife, rope, spanner, lead piping, candlestick, gun	Ms. Scarlett, with the knife, in the library.

=== Series 2 ===
This series brought a new host in Chris Tarrant and a new smaller set with a new brown and orange theme with each weapon on an individual plinth at the front of the set and a map of the grange in the background. This is the first series that all guests are killers in one season. Lewis Collins, who would play Colonel Mustard in Series 3, makes an appearance in episode 6 as the murder victim (and Mrs. Peacock's supposedly dead husband) Jack Peacock. In the same episode Richard Madeley is a guest panelist who would later be host of seasons 3 and 4

Episode	Episode title	Date	Million viewers _{(ITV rank)}	Details	Motives	Teams	Weapons	Solution
1	A Deadly Deal	24 April 1991		Investment broker Simon Charles (Malcolm Stoddard) had convinced many of the guests to delve into a deal with later fell through and all lost a lot of money apart from Simon who pulled out last minute and tells the guests that the only way they can get their money back is to invest more but who makes it more to a killing?	Mrs. Peacock - She has now put Arlington Grange forward in the new deal but did she kill to save her home?; Col. Mustard - Simon knew that he was involved in some insider deals and Simon blackmailed him.; Rev Green - He had bet the £20,000 that Mrs. Peacock had given him for the new church window on the deal and Mrs. Peacock is starting to get suspicious and he is angry.; Mrs. White - She had invested her entire life savings into the deal and has no second chance to get it back.; Prof. Plum - Simon's new deal involves a stolen software which Plum invented, did he want to get revenge?; Ms. Scarlett - She lost a lot of money in the deal, did she kill to wipe her debt?	Team 1: Actress Sally Whittaker and TV presenter Matthew Kelly; Team 2: TV presenter Michaela Strachan and actor John McArdle	steak hammer, ebony ruler, sharpening steel, rat poison, scarf, gun	Mrs. White, in the kitchen, with the sharpening steel.
2	The Best Insurance	1 May 1991	8.44 (22nd).	Mrs. Peacock wants to re-insure some of the valuables at the grange after recent neighborhood burglaries but the arrival of insurance assessor George Biddle (Mark Eden) (an old friend of Col. Mustard's) brings enemies from more than one of the guests but who killed Mr. Biddle?	Mrs. Peacock - Mr. Biddle may have evidence to show that her husband's death was not accidental and a dodgy life insurance policy could set her back a lot of money.; Col. Mustard - He is angered that Mr. Biddle did not come through with his promise to get him on the board of directors.; Rev. Green - A fake insurance claim on some candlesticks after a burglary could see him in trouble.; Mrs. White - She was very suspicious that Mr. Biddle knew that she was an arsonist at her last place of employment and did not want that revealed.; Prof. Plum - After being in possession of some stolen pre-Columbian art, he did not want Mr. Biddle to fiddle with his plans.; Ms. Scarlett - Mr. Biddle found out that she pawned the bronze statue for a fake and wanted it kept secret.	Team 1: Broadcaster-journalist Pamela Armstrong and actor George Layton; Team 2: TV presenter Gaby Roslin and TV presenter Frank Bough	kettle flex, candlestick, gun, antique knife, bronze statue, poker	Rev. Green, in the kitchen, with the kettle flex.
3	Fatal Distraction	8 May 1991	8.94 (16th).	Top TV soap star Marianne Kray (Sharon Maughan) arrives at Arlington Grange to film a life story about George Velares, who used to live at the grange but her real name Maisie sees the guests angered from past experiences but what did Maisie do to lead to her death?	Mrs. Peacock - Maisie was Mrs. Peacock's understudy in "King's Destiny" and believed she poisoned her to get her role and rise to fame.; Col. Mustard - He lived in the village when George Velares was at the grange and knew the true reason George died but does he want it revealed?; Rev. Green - Marieanne wants him to help her make it big or she will publish her life story which entails her affairs with him.; Mrs. White - Marieanne is constantly mean to her, did she give Marieanne her comeuppance.; Prof. Plum - He is angered that Marieanne stole his script to which he spent a lot of time researching on.; Ms. Scarlett - Marianne was given the part she wanted, did she kill to get what she wanted what she was promised?	Team 1: Author. Agony Aunt Claire Rayner and comedian and TV presenter Andrew O'Connor. Team 2: TV presenter and model Annabel Giles and TV presenter Gordon Burns	palette knife, cheese wire cutter, poison, golf club, rope, scissors	Col. Mustard, with the rope, in the kitchen.
4	Charity Begins At Home	15 May 1991	7.2 (26th).	Arlington grange is host to a charity auction to raise money for the new church roof but Ben the window cleaner (Nick Berry) is listening to guest's conversations who has been hired by Mrs. Peacock, to find out who has been stealing items from around the house but Ben delves a bit too far into the guest's business but who took it to Ben's death?	Mrs. Peacock - Ben wants in on a potential 6 figure turner painting and buys it for pennies at the auction.; Col. Mustard - Ben tries to crack a deal with Mustard over the Turner and he is not impressed; Rev. Green - Ben investigated £5,000 going missing from the church from Easter functions, Did Ben know what happened to the money?; Mrs. White - Ben finds out she is the thief, did she kill so he will not expose her to Mrs. Peacock?; Prof Plum - He knows what happened to the old people's holiday fund, did Ben find out and he killed to keep it secret?; Ms. Scarlett - She caught Ben snooping in her drawers, did she kill to keep secrets that he might have found?	Team 1: Actress Carmen Silvera and Author/Journalist Sir Clement Freud; Team 2: TV Presenter Nina Myskow and TV Presenter Chris Packham	spanner, lead piping, African spear, revolver, candlestick, kitchen knife	Mrs. Peacock, with the lead piping, in the billiard room.
5	A Traveller's Tale	29 May 1991	7.76 (21st).	A swarm of caravan traveling hippies have arrived in Arlington and have taken over Col. Mustard's land. Ms. Scarlett is very intimate with one hippie, Dave (Christopher Guard), but when he comes for dinner at Arlington Grange, is he all that he appears to be as he ends up dead.	Mrs. Peacock - The hippies have caused property values to plummet, did she kill to stay afloat?; Col. Mustard - He made an agreement with Dave that the hippies could squat on his land to decrease the property values, did he kill after realizing the mistake he made?; Rev Green - Green was angry that the hippies are on the land next to the church and have protested on the church, did he kill to get the church back?; Mrs. White - Dave was constantly mean to her, did she finally snap and kill?; Prof. Plum - He had a dark secret to which Dave found out, did he kill to keep his secret safe?; Ms. Scarlett - She was in love with Dave but did she kill after finding out something new about him?	Team 1: Actress Amanda Barrie and TV Presenter Jim Bowen; Team 2: Actress Michelle Collins and Radio DJ Mike Read.	spanner, knife, poison, candlestick, shotgun, telephone flex	Ms. Scarlett, with the knife, in the study.
6	The Bolivian Connection	5 June 1991	9.00 (21st).	It is the day of Col. Mustard and Mrs. Peacock's wedding but it ends in ruins with the arrival of Mrs. Peacock's supposedly dead husband Jack Peacock (Lewis Collins) who supposedly died on an expedition with Prof. Plum, searching for a "wonder drug" in Bolivia but what does his return mean for the guests and who made it more into a killing?	Mrs. Peacock - Arlington grange truly belongs to Jack and with his return, it meant that she would lose everything, did she kill to prevent this from happening?; Col. Mustard - Jack's return sees Mrs. Peacock call off the wedding, with much money, marriage, and revenge, did he kill to keep his lover?; Rev. Green - He paid for a £15,000 altar screen which was Mrs. Peacock's wedding gift to the church which she promised to pay for, now she has lost her money, did he kill so we would not be left with the bill?; Mrs. White - After never seeing eye to eye before he went to Bolivia, did she kill to keep her job?; Prof. Plum - He was on the research team that sent Jack to Bolivia to find a wonder drug to cure a common cold, did greed lead him to kill?; Ms. Scarlett - On the brink of losing her inheritance and her home, was it a strong motive to kill?	Team 1: TV Presenters and married couple Richard Madeley and Judy Finnigan; Team 2: TV Presenters and Married couple Maggie Philbin and Keith Chegwin	funeral urn, scarf, glass of champagne, revolver, paperweight, cake knife	Prof. Plum, with the funeral urn, in the drawing room.

=== Series 3 ===
Richard Madeley takes over as host for this and the next series, and with him came a new set which had a silver and blue theme. Not much change was seen but mainly made for fake marble. There were no weapons presented in front of the teams for the first time and at the end of each episode, viewers got a chance to answer a question about that episode's murder to win a murder mystery weekend.

Notably, one of the guests in episode 3 is Nicholas Parsons who would go on to portray Rev. Green in the next series.

Episode	Episode title	Date	Million viewers _{(ITV rank)}	Details	Motives	Teams	Weapons	Solution
1	A Hunting We Will Go	4 May 1992	9.53 (21st).	It's the day of the Arlington hunt but hunt saboteurs cause trouble for the hunters and one saboteur Gordon Ferrar (Neil Morrissey) who was attacked by Col. Mustard is cleaned up at the grange and causes an enemy of everyone but who had the full drive the kill?	Mrs. Peacock - Her horse Phantom was killed in the hunt by the saboteurs scaring it and was hit by a truck, did she avenge the death of her horse?; Col. Mustard - He was jealous of Gordon's relationship with Miss Scarlet, did he want to finish what he started?; Rev. Green - He witnessed Gordon being beaten by Col. Mustard and also been working with the saboteurs for years. With his loyalty in question, did the pressure cause him to kill?; Mrs. White - She helped clean up Gordon and felt guilty after finding out about Phantom, did she kill to silence her sorrows?; Prof. Plum - Gordon had a video of him feeding fox cubs to the hounds, did he kill so he wouldn't be exposed?; Ms. Scarlett - She held a secret of how she knew Gordon before, did she kill so it wouldn't come to light?	Team 1: TV Presenter Valerie Singleton and TV Presenter Johnny Ball; Team 2: MP Edwina Currie and TV Presenter Richard O'Brien	scissors, candlestick, telephone flex, poker, syringe, billiard cue	Rev. Green, in the kitchen, with the scissors.
2	Scared to Death	11 May 1992	8.96 (18th).	Mrs. White believes that she is seeing ghosts so psychic negotiator Miss Terri (Ruth Madoc) arrives on the advice of Prof. Plum but what she gets from the spirits turns the guests against her but who killed the psychic in the lighting on the night?	Mrs. Peacock - Did a potential scandal involving her late husband lead her to kill?; Col. Mustard - Did the affair between him and Ms. Scarlett cause him to kill the psychic?; Rev. Green - His secret money making scheme with Col. Mustard was on the brink of exposure, did he kill to keep the money he had?; Mrs. White - Already on edge, did she kill to make the voice go away?; Prof. Plum - Did the spirit of a dead former student see Plum kill so the truth was unheard?; Ms. Scarlett - With an affair in the air, did she kill to keep her secret lover?	Team 1: TV presenter Annabel Croft and sports presenter Dickie Davies; Team 2: TV presenter Lorraine Kelly and News Reader Martyn Lewis	candlestick, gun, dagger, statuette, cross and chain, decanter	Col. Mustard, with the dagger, in the billiard room.
3	Murder In Merrie England	18 May 1992	19.01 (15th).	European multi-millionaire Max Gold (Mike Sarne) has plans for Arlington Grange and has made Mrs. Peacock an offer she can't refuse but when he reveals he wants to turn the grange into a new water park but who had the bigger motive to kill?	Mrs. Peacock - Wanting to save her ancestral home, did she kill to keep history alive?; Col. Mustard - Feeling double-crossed by Gold, did he kill to save his reputation?; Rev. Green - He lost his promised land and the church integrity is decreasing, did he kill to save the church?; Mrs. White - With the threat of losing her job, did she kill to keep it?; Prof. Plum - His long hard archaeological work would be in ruins, did he kill to keep his job?; Ms. Scarlett - Her inheritance is to be lost, did she kill to keep her future?	Team 1: TV presenter Lynn Faulds Wood and actor Nicholas Parsons; Team 2: Actress Sarah Kennedy and actor Jonathon Morris	croquet mallet, stocking, bow with arrows, fossil, meat cleaver, poker	Mrs. Peacock, in the study, with the croquet mallet.
4	And Then There Were Nuns	25 May 1992	7.06 (29th).	After receiving a letter, Mrs. Peacock's late husband Jack's sister, Sister Concepta (Jean Boht) arrives at the grange for what was a nice family reunion but the Sister has other plans and has everybody at the cards as she plans to build her convent but who would most want to ruin her attempts and kill her?	Mrs. Peacock - her home was to be taken away - she kills to keep it?; Col. Mustard - His dark deeds from his army days were threatened to be exposed, did he kill to preserve his integrity?; Rev. Green - Sister Concepta was his ultimate rival for his parish, did he kill to make him the ultimate winner?; Mrs. White - Regretful of sending the letter that started it all, did she kill to stop what she started?; Prof. Plum - His scientific reputation was on the line, did he kill to keep it safe?; Ms. Scarlett - With her inheritance lost, did she kill to gain it back?	Team 1: TV Presenter Carol Vorderman and Charles Kennedy; Team 2: Kathy Tayler and Newscaster Richard Bath	spear, shotgun, cake knife, parasol, corkscrew, paperweight	Mrs. White, with the spear, in the drawing room.
5	Blackmail and The Fourth Estate	1 Jun. 1992	11.03 (15th).	Mrs. Peacock is playing host to a journalist, David Stringer (Dudley Sutton) who has promised to write an article that will make Arlington Grange extremely famous. Although he is promising this, his nose turns up in places where it is not wanted, and he ends up murdered.	Mrs. Peacock - Stringer's research would ruin the reputation of the grange, did she kill to keep her reputation intact?; Col. Mustard - Stringer had inside knowledge on what Col. Mustard's art was in the Gulf war, did he kill to make sure it kept hidden?; Rev. Green - Stringer found out that he had a gambling problem and his affairs with several ladies in his parish, did he kill to keep him hush?; Mrs. White - Stringer knew that Mrs. White set fire to her last place of work, did she kill to keep it secret?; Prof. Plum - Stringer knew that he authorized a drug which killed hundreds of people, did he kill to keep this secret?; Miss. Scarlett - Stringer had some scandalous photos of her, did she kill to make sure they weren't leaked.	Team 1: Newsreader Lisa Aziz and actor Kevin Lloyd; Team 2: TV presenter Jenny Powell and society columnist Nigel Dempster	knife, billiard cue, curtain cord, insecticide, carving fork, gun	Prof. Plum, in the library, with the insecticide.
6	Deadly Dowry	8 Jun. 1992	9.62 (14th).	Ms. Scarlett brings a guest Clive Moxton (Simon Shepherd) to the grange for dinner and the guests are shocked when they reveal they are engaged which sends them into a spin but what secret transactions led to Clive being killed?	Mrs. Peacock - With no money for her stepdaughter, did she kill to protect Ms. Scarlett from paying her debt?; Col. Mustard - Angered in jealousy over his secret love affair with Ms. Scarlett, did he kill him to keep his affair one-sided?; Rev. Green - Clive found out he was a card sharp at the gambling table and he threatened to be exposed, did he kill to save his reputation?; Mrs. White - Wanting to help those in need, did she kill to protect her beloved friend?; Prof. Plum - He used Ms. Scarlett's trust fund to save himself, did he kill so no one else would know?; Ms. Scarlett - Forced into marriage to clear her debts, did she kill to get her in the black?	Team 1: Actress and TV personality Una Stubbs and sports presenter and newsreader Nick Owen; Team 2: Newspaper editor Eve Pollard and actor Philip Middlemiss	billiard cue, poker, candlestick, swordstick, meat pounder, gun	Ms. Scarlett, in the billiard room, with the swordstick.

=== Series 4 ===
Richard Madeley introduced each episode from Arlington Grange, showing the possible weapons to the viewers. Once in the studio, viewers were given the option to see the murder solution before the questioning began, or to look away while the solution was shown so they could play along at home.

Episode	Episode title	Date	Million viewers _{(ITV rank)}	Details	Motives	Teams	Weapons	Solution
1	Finders, Keepers	19 April 1993	9.2 (27th).	Local farmer Jake Swithin (Ray Lonnen) digs up some lost gold treasures while plowing his field, but not everyone is happy about his lucky discovery.	Mrs. Peacock's ancestors were responsible for the gold's disappearance, and she feared her family name would be dishonored.; Colonel Mustard was in financial trouble and jealous of Jake's good fortune.; Rev. Green claimed the gold had been stolen from his church, and Jake refused to provide him with any funds from the gold.; Professor Plum's reputation would be discredited when his published history of Arlington Grange was found to be untrue.; Ms. Scarlett and Jake were lovers, but he threatened to release intimate videos of her when he ended their relationship.; Mrs. White had acted as a mother to Jake in recent years, but he turned his back on her and treated her with contempt.	Team 1: Siân Lloyd and David Steel; Team 2:Andy Crane and Beverley Callard	walking stick, dagger, scarf, meat pounder, champagne bottle, sword	Professor Plum, with the dagger, in the billiard room.
2	Seven Deadly Sinners	26 April 1993	8.77 (28th).	Cabinet minister Sir Nigel Hussey (Ian McNeice) is to approve plans for the Sin City pleasure park to be built next to Arlington Grange, but the plans are not popular with the locals.	Mrs. Peacock wished to protect the history and reputation of Arlington Grange, under threat from the construction plans.; Colonel Mustard was threatened by Sir Nigel about embarrassing secrets from his MI5 past, and was angered by Ms. Scarlett's humiliation.; Rev. Green had unwisely invested church funds and was double-crossed by the minister when he asked for some financial return.; Professor Plum feared the pleasure park would cause local property prices (including his own) to crash.; Ms. Scarlett was exploited by Sir Nigel and was denied the financial security of a contract with the park.; Mrs. White was deeply concerned for the welfare of local wildlife if the pleasure park were to be built.	Team 1: Carol Thatcher and Bob Holness; Team 2: Dermot Murnaghan and Liz Kershaw	flamethrower, G-string, golf club, venomous snake, crossbow, pistol	Colonel Mustard, in the kitchen, with G-String.
3	The Word, The Flesh & The Devil	3 May 1993		Crime writer Candice Costello (Caroline Langrishe) visits Arlington Grange to research and gather material, but finds enough dark secrets to match her own.	Mrs. Peacock tried to blackmail Candice, but soon found the tables turned against her.; Colonel Mustard felt led on and humiliated after Candice rejected his advances.; Reverend Green shared his literary ideas with the writer, only for her to realize the lethal truth behind his words.; Professor Plum was threatened with a scandal, as Candice knew sordid secrets from his past.; Ms. Scarlett was jealous of Candice's flirtation with Colonel Mustard.; Mrs. White wished to avenge the death of her nephew, who died on a ship owned by Candice's father.	Team 1: Steve Wright and Nerys Hughes; Team 2: Elton Welsby and Bella Emberg	poker, battery recharger, kitchen scissors, ice pick, meat cleaver, poison pen	Reverend Green, in the kitchen, with the ice pick.
4	The Hanged Man	10 May 1993		Tarot reader Marjory Hunt (Jean Alexander) visits her old friend Mrs. White, but the omens in her deck do not look good.	Mrs. Peacock was unsettled by Marjory's tarot reading, as she was planning a dodgy insurance claim.; Colonel Mustard was in trouble with counterfeit money and was overheard by Marjory making a threatening phone call.; Reverend Green feared an affair with a local parishioner would be exposed.; Professor Plum had killed Mrs. White's fish and worried about what else Marjory might reveal.; Ms. Scarlett wanted to cover up her recent hit-and-run accident in the village.; Mrs. White had a dark family secret, which Marjory hinted at knowing in the tarot reading.	Team 1: Tessa Sanderson and Jason Riddington; Team 2: Nula Conwell and John Virgo	rat poison, brooch, desktop lighter, billiard cue, letter opener, toilet chain	Ms. Scarlett, with the desktop lighter, in the drawing room.
5	Where There's A Will	17 May 1993		Mrs. White has inherited a large amount of money, but financial adviser Terry Radcliffe (Matthew Marsh) plans to divert her funds elsewhere.	Mrs. Peacock needed to balance her debts and feared Terry's advice would cloud Mrs. White's judgment.; Colonel Mustard's future with Mrs. Peacock was under threat unless their financial troubles were solved.; Reverend Green recognized Terry from a previous financial misdemeanor and wanted revenge against his former associate.; Professor Plum faced losing his research investment when Mrs. White's inheritance was signed away.; Ms. Scarlett had planned to profit from Terry's scheme but realized she couldn't trust him.; Mrs. White stood to lose her fortune after investing with the unscrupulous adviser.	Team 1: Matthew Collins and Jenny Agutter; Team 2: John Barnes and Judi Spiers	garden hoe, corkscrew, shotgun, sculpture, carving knife, decanter stopper	Mrs. White, in the study, with the decanter stopper.
6	Publish & Be Damned	24 May 1993		Mrs. Peacock invites Journalist Roger Morgan (Daniel Peacock) to Arlington Grange but he is in search of royal scandal and the residents do not wish to divulge all their secrets.	Mrs. Peacock realized she may have revealed too many scandals, which would ruin her social standing.; Colonel Mustard was ashamed of an incident while working as a royal bodyguard, details of which Roger may have published.; Reverend Green felt unsavory publications could harm the Church, and hoped to stop any harmful allegations.; Professor Plum feared the journalist would blackmail him about recorded conversations from hidden microphones.; Ms. Scarlett fed Roger various salacious lies and was concerned her deception would be uncovered.; Mrs. White objected to Roger's tabloid techniques and wanted to protect the good name of the monarchy.	Team 1: John Stapleton and Nichola McAuliffe; Team 2: Russell Grant and Anne Gregg Note: Both teams come to the solution at the same time.	dagger, cheese-wire, billiard triangle, broken glass, kitchen knife, microphone	Mrs. Peacock, in the study, with the microphone.
