= The Enchanted World of Brambly Hedge =

- Genre: Children's; Animated
- Created by: Jill Barklem
- Based on: Brambly Hedge by Jill Barklem
- Narrated by: Robert Lindsay
- Country of origin: United Kingdom
- Original language: English
- No. of episodes: 8

Production
- Executive producers: Kate Hawkes; Peter Orton; Theresa Plummer-Andrews; Mark Hall (episodes 1–4)
- Producer: Jackie Cockle
- Running time: 25 minutes
- Production companies: Cosgrove Hall Films (season 1); HOT Animation (season 2); HIT Entertainment

Original release
- Network: BBC1 (Children's BBC)
- Release: 25 December 1996 – 3 January 2000

The Enchanted World of Brambly Hedge is a British stop-motion animated series based on the eight Brambly Hedge books by Jill Barklem. The show was produced by HIT Entertainment with Cosgrove Hall Films handling production for the first season and HIT's in-house studio HOT Animation handling the second.

== Cast ==
Character	Original UK version	US version
Narrator	Robert Lindsay	James Flinders
Wilfred Toadflax	Neil Morrissey	Debi Green
Dusty Dogwood	Neil Morrissey	James Flinders
Primrose Woodmouse	Charlotte Coleman	Deanna Morris
Poppy Eyebright	Charlotte Coleman	Deanna Morris
Basil	Jim Broadbent	Doug Stone
Ernest Vole	Jim Broadbent	Doug Stone
Purslane Saltapple	Jim Broadbent	Doug Stone
Mrs Apple	June Whitfield	Stephanie Wallace
Heather Vole	June Whitfield	Stephanie Wallace
Thrift Saltapple	June Whitfield	Stephanie Wallace
Mr Apple	Michael Williams	James Flinders
Lady Daisy Woodmouse	Rosemary Leach	B. G. Mills
Old Mrs Eyebright	Rosemary Leach	Christine Albers
Lord Woodmouse	Anton Rodgers	Doug Stone
Crabby Blackjacket	Anton Rodgers	Doug Stone
Mr Toadflax	Alun Lewis	Christy Mathewson
Mrs Toadflax	Noreen Kershaw	B. G. Mills
Mrs Crustybread	Noreen Kershaw	Christine Albers
Additional voices	Kate Harbour; David Holt	Christy Mathewson; B. G. Mills; Stephanie Wallace; William Wenge

== Episodes ==
No.	Title	Original release date
1	"Winter Story: An Ice Palace Party"	25 December 1996
Wilfred is looking forward to the deep snow to ride on his sledge. Better still, when the snow covers the third notch comes the Snow Ball celebration at the Oak Palace. Soon, Basil, Wilfred and Primrose get trapped in one of the snow tunnels. Primrose finds a way out and summons the other mice to help out. After that, everyone celebrates.
2	"Spring Story: Wilfred's Special Birthday"	31 March 1997
Today is Wilfred's birthday. The mice arrange a surprise picnic at Bluebell Bank and Primrose makes sure that Wilfred doesn't know about it yet. Basil accidentally misplaces Wilfred's picnic hamper. Wilfred recovers the wrong hamper, but luckily, his father gets the correct hamper and Wilfred's birthday celebration begins.
3	"Summer Story: An Enchanted Riverside Wedding"	25 August 1997
Poppy and Dusty have seen other so often. Dusty wishes to propose to Poppy. Wilfred and Primrose try to bring the couple together. Finally comes the day of the wedding. Unfortunately, Wilfred's blunder causes the wedding raft to drift down the stream, away from the bride, but Wilfred eventually manages to catch the raft and the wedding is saved.
4	"Autumn Story: Primrose's Stormy Night"	26 October 1997
During the harvest season, Lord Woodmouse and Primrose go picking blackberries, while Wilfred looks for adventure by trying to find a creature called "The Weasel". Primrose and Wilfred get lost as they explore the wilderness, so all the other mice send out a search party. The search party finds Primrose and Wilfred, so they all return home.
5	"The Secret Staircase: The Midwinter Festivities"	26 December 1998
Midwinter's Day is coming. Primrose and Wilfred are assigned to recite the Midwinter Poem, and they discover a secret staircase concealed in the attic and many old rooms within. They finally stumble down a secret tunnel making it in time for the Midwinter celebrations, but they keep the old rooms a secret.
6	"High Hills: Wilfred's Rafting Expedition"	2 April 1999
Wilfred joins Mr Apple and the Weavers to the High Hills. Mr Apple and Wilfred do some exploring, getting lost and stuck up ridges, but Wilfred has the essential equipment. Primrose and the Weavers search for them, but Wilfred and Mr Apple reach them by raft.
7	"Sea Story: The Adventure to Find More Salt"	29 December 1999
Wilfred and Primrose are going with Dusty and Poppy on an expedition to the sea to gather salt at Seagull Rock. After the journey, they meet Perslame and his family. When a storm approaches Primrose rescues Shrimp. When the storm passes, the salt is packed and ready to go.
8	"Poppy's Babies: The Construction of a New Home"	3 January 2000
Poppy is very busy and overworked looking after her babies. Mr Apple and many other mice help clean and refurbish some his old rooms for the naming ceremony, trying to keep it a secret surprise for Poppy. After a lot of work, the new house is ready for the celebration.

== Broadcast ==
In the United States, episodes began airing on the Starz premium channel in 1997.
