= Brambly Hedge =

Children's book series by Jill Barklem

Brambly Hedge is a series of children's books with watercolour illustrations by Jill Barklem, recounting the adventures of a community of mice who live together in the tranquil surroundings of the English countryside. The writer described Brambly Hedge as a loving and caring society. The tales involve conflict resolution within nature or exploration, and/or the adventures of working together to achieve a common goal. There are no unkind characters or predators, apart from a passing reference to weasels in Autumn Story.

The books, whose first titles were published in 1980, are written and illustrated by Barklem. The first four books follow the seasonal pattern of Spring, Summer, Autumn, and Winter. Her later four books follow the mice's various adventures and activities.

== Works ==
The four seasons were originally released as individual volumes in a miniature format (17.6×14.6 cm / 5.7×6.9 in). The next two, The Secret Staircase and The High Hills, were published as full-sized books (24×19.5 cm / 7.6×9.5 in). The last two books, Sea Story and Poppy's Babies, were released in the miniature format (17.6×14.6 cm / 5.7×6.9 in). Many later collections have all books in a larger format. The books are published by HarperCollins Children's Books in the United Kingdom and United States.

- Spring Story (1980) – Wilfred Toadflax enjoys a picnic and a surprise for his birthday at Bluebell Bank.
- Summer Story (1980) – The mice celebrate a special wedding, and everyone takes part in the preparations.
- Autumn Story (1980) – Primrose Woodmouse wanders off and finds herself in uncharted territory. Will anyone ever find her as the storm rages?
- Winter Story (1980) – The biggest snowstorm in years leaves just enough snow for a party in a palace made entirely out of ice.
- The Secret Staircase (1983) – Primrose and Wilfred go up to the attic on their own to practice reciting the Mid-Winter Poem for an important performance.
- The High Hills (1986) – Wilfred is determined to find some treasure in the hills above Brambly Hedge.
- Sea Story (1990) – Dusty Dogwood, Poppy Eyebright, Primrose Woodmouse and Wilfred Toadflax sail down river to retrieve salt from the sea mice.
- Poppy's Babies (1994) – A surprise comes to mother Poppy Eyebright on the babies' naming day.

=== Collections ===
==== Partial collections ====
- The Four Seasons of Brambly Hedge (1988) ISBN 0001840266 — 1 slipcased (7.68x9.29 in) volume containing seasonal first four books and 20 page author interview
- The Four Seasons of Brambly Hedge (1990) ISBN 0399218696 — 1 (20x20 in) volume containing seasonal first four books and 20 page author interview
- The Brambly Hedge Treasury (1999) — 1 volume containing The Secret Staircase, The High Hills, and an introduction with select illustrations from the first four books (~8.5x11 in)
- A Year in Brambly Hedge (2010) — 4 book box set containing the seasonal first four books (5.75x6.93 in)

==== Complete collections ====
- The Brambly Hedge Complete Collection (1999; later reprints & new editions) — 1 slipcased volume (8.9x11.5 in)
- The Complete Brambly Hedge (1999; later reprints & new editions) — 1 volume (7.75x10 in)
- The Complete Brambly Hedge (1999) — 1 volume, produced for The Book People/Ted Smart by HarperCollins (7.75x10 in)
- The Brambly Hedge Library (2000) — 8 book box set (5.91x7.24 in)
- Brambly Hedge: The Classic Collection (2018) — 1 slipcased volume (221x286 mm / 8.7x11.26 in)

=== Stories from Brambly Hedge ===
Two further books were written by Alan MacDonald and illustrated by Lizzie Sanders:

- Stories from Brambly Hedge: Wilfred to the Rescue (2005)
- Stories from Brambly Hedge: Primrose in Charge (2006)

=== Audio books ===
The first four seasonal books were produced in audio form; one hour narrated by John Moffatt. Audiobooks and CDs are marketed under the titles The Brambly Hedge Collection (2005) and A Year in Brambly Hedge (2014).

== Development ==
Barklem spent five years on research before she started to write her stories about the mice of Brambly Hedge. Her interest in natural history and traditional rural customs and crafts has spilled over into these chronicles of hedgerow life. She lived with her husband and children near Epping Forest in England.

== Merchandise ==
Since the 1980s, the Brambly Hedge characters have appeared on merchandise ranging from china to chocolate, stationery, and pewter miniatures. Companies such as Royal Doulton, Hantel, Crummles, and Border Fine Arts have all produced collectible pieces licensed from Brambly Hedge.

== Television adaptations ==
All eight books were adapted into a stop motion television series produced by HIT Entertainment, but in a different order than the books. The episode "Winter Story" was premiered instead of the episode based on the first book "Spring Story". At the end of every episode, its summary was played alongside the credits. The first four episodes were animated by Cosgrove Hall Films, while the later four were animated by the then-newly formed HOT Animation.

The series premiere was first broadcast in UK on Christmas Day 1996 on the Children's BBC block on BBC1, and it made its US debut on the Starz pay-cable network the following year. The series featured the voices of Neil Morrissey, June Whitfield, and Jim Broadbent among others. The series also aired on CBeebies between 2002 and 2005.

Lupus Films announced in February 2020 that they had optioned the series for a new adaptation, to premiere as a Christmas special.
