= Cassie (Skins series 1) =

- Skins episode
- Sid and Cassie sitting in the cafeteria at college
- Episode no.: Series 1 Episode 2
- Directed by: Paul Gay
- Written by: Bryan Elsley
- Original air date: 1 February 2007

Guest appearances
- Neil Morrissey as Marcus Ainsworth; Naomi Allisstone as Margeritte Ainsworth; Alan George as Alan; Daniel Kaluuya as Posh Kenneth; Siwan Morris as Angie the Psychology Teacher; Stephen Walters as Madison Twatter

Episode chronology
← Previous "Tony"	Next → "Jal"
- Skins series 1

"Cassie" is the second episode of the first season of the British drama television series Skins. It was written by Bryan Elsley and directed by Paul Gay. It is told from the point of view of main character Cassie Ainsworth. It aired on E4 on 1 February 2007.

== Plot ==
The episode begins with Cassie waking up after a party at Michelle's (April Pearson) house. She then travels around the house and finds Anwar (Dev Patel) praying. She then finds Michelle's calendar and reminds Michelle to tell her that her mom is coming home that day. She kisses a sleeping Sid (Mike Baily) on the head before she leaves the house.

Cassie takes the bus home, she finds a post-it note on her back from the party that reads 'EAT'. She watches other patrons on the bus eat, including being offered a piece of chocolate from a child that sits opposite to her. Cassie comes home and helps her little brother Ruben as her parents ignore them, she is messaged to 'EAT' from an unknown number on her phone.

Cassie's father is preoccupied with painting her mother and she reminds them it's her last day in the clinic. Cassie is then picked up by Alan (Alan George), her taxi driver friend. She puts weights in her undergarments to prove she has gained a half kilo of weight in order to leave the clinic while in the taxi, she is successful in her examination. In her group therapy, we learn Mad Twatter (Stephan Walters) is still upset about Sid not paying him back for the weed he'd lost in the previous episode.

Back at college, Cassie sits with Sid in the cafeteria. Cassie expresses she likes Sid and trusts him enough to teach him how to look like she's eating when she's not. He thinks it's wrong about how she lies about eating. Then she explains how it's nobody business if she eats or not and how nobody cares, Sid claims that he does care. Cassie looks back at Sid's plate of fries they now spell 'EAT'. Cassie tells Sid how Mad is still upset about the missing money, Sid goes into crisis mode.

Sid, Tony (Nicholas Hoult) and Chris (Joe Dempshie) all run into Angie (Siawn Morris), their psychology teacher, in the staff showers, this arises tension between Chris and Angie. Sid then goes to Angie for advice on how to solve the debt. Cassie sits in English class as she receives another 'EAT' message on her phone and it is revealed that Mad Twatter will be the forthcoming substitute teacher for the class. Cassie gets another 'EAT' message and thinks it is from Sid as he put down his phone as soon as she walks out from college. We learn from Sid that Cassie hasn't been receiving any messages at all and that Sid was not sending them to her.

Cassie runs home, then calls Alan who shows up to a restaurant with her and encourages her to eat. The episode ends with Cassie eating a burger she'd ordered.

== Soundtrack ==
All the music featured in this episode.

- "Cody" by Mogwai
- "Right Place, Wrong Time" by Jon Spencer Blues Explosion, written by Dr. John
- "3-3" by Summer Night Air
- "La Donna E Mobile" from the opera: Rigoletto
- "The New Cobweb Summer" by Lambchop
- "Move Bitch" by Ludacris
- "Aht Uh Mi Head" by Shuggie Otis
- "This Days" by The Sleepy Jackson
- "Atlantis" by Donovan

== Reception ==
"Cassie" is ranked No. 9 of the most highly rated (8.6) Skins episodes by IMDb.

This episode was the first look in on Cassie's life and would reshape the show and its fanbase. This episode has been criticised for its representation of an eating disorder. Although some have seen the episode as 'revolutionary' for even speaking about the subject, other believe it 'glorifies' the disorder. Cassie also gives a demonstration of how she avoids eating, giving teenagers a view into how to dedicate themselves to this lifestyle.
