= Winter Story (Brambly Hedge) =

Book by Jill Barklem

- Book cover
- Author: Jill Barklem
- Language: English
- Genre: Children's literature
- Publication date: 1980
- Preceded by: Autumn Story (Brambly Hedge)

Winter Story is a 1980 children's book, the final of the four seasons of Jill Barklem's Brambly Hedge series. In the book the biggest snowstorm in years leaves enough snow for an ice ball. The Economist review of books described the book as a "(Beatrix) potter through Brambly Hedge", "mousy little tales with beautiful, busy drawings".
