= Rubbadubbers =

British children's television series

- Genre: Children's television series Stop-motion
- Created by: Peter Curtis
- Written by: Marc Seal; Jan Page; Andrew Viner; Tom Cocklin; Andrew Brenner; Sally Lever; Hiawyn Oram; Jocelyn Stevenson; Hazel McBride; Polly Churchill
- Directed by: Brian Little; Nick Herbert
- Voices of: John Gordon Sinclair; Sean Hughes; Maria Darling
- Theme music composer: KiCK Production
- Opening theme: "Here Come the Rubbadubbers"
- Ending theme: "Here Come the Rubbadubbers" (Instrumental)
- Composer: KiCK Production
- Country of origin: United Kingdom
- Original language: English
- No. of series: 4
- No. of episodes: 52

Production
- Executive producer: Jocelyn Stevenson
- Producer: Jackie Cockle
- Editors: Zyggy Markiewicz; Jane Hicks
- Running time: 10 minutes 2 minutes (shorts)
- Production companies: HOT Animation; HIT Entertainment

Original release
- Network: CBeebies
- Release: 15 January 2003 – 14 February 2005

Rubbadubbers is a British stop-motion animated children's television series produced by HIT Entertainment, with animation production by Hot Animation. It was broadcast in the UK on BBC2 and CBeebies from 15 January 2003 to 14 February 2005. Created by Peter Curtis, it focuses on seven friendly, sentient bath toys as they find themselves in their dreams of imaginary worlds outside of the bathroom they live in – the ringleader in the series being a pink toy frog named Tubb. In the US, the series was broadcast on Nickelodeon, Noggin and PBS Kids Sprout.

The series was originally announced under the working title "Plugg" (an early name for the character of Tubb). Hasbro licensed Rubbadubbers for producing a toy line to promote the series. The series concluded production on 14 February 2005 after 52 episodes.

== Premise ==
Seven anthropomorphic bath toys called the Rubbadubbers live a peaceful life in the bathroom of a house somewhere in England. The toys belong to two children who live at the house named Benjie and Sis (however, they are never seen or heard by viewers). Whenever the children or anyone else is not in the bathroom, the Rubbadubbers come to life and usually begin a fun activity.

However, in every episode, one of the toys (excluding Winona) become frustrated with the way a certain activity or situation goes. They then wish for it to go as planned by beginning the wish with "If only-". Suddenly, they begin dreaming about an alternate reality where the wish comes true. When they immediately realize this, they are surprised and say, "I said, if only!". Some of the other Rubbadubbers appear in their dream world as well, where they play different versions of their regular selves in order to either assist or hinder the character that made the wish.

It always turns out that the chosen Rubbadubber's wish never goes the way that they planned, much to their disappointment. They then complain again with another "If only-," wish, which automatically ends the dream. When the dream disappears, the Rubbadubber says "Oh, I'm back!" or "Oh, I'm back in the bathroom!" and they learn to be careful with what they wish for, and then decide that instead of changing the real-world situation to their will, they should simply leave it as it was and find a way to deal with it or even have fun with it. All the Rubbadubbers are then happy again. Every episode ends with Reg the robot, one of the Rubbadubbers, announcing to the others that Benjie and Sis are arriving in the bathroom for a bath. The toys then excitedly prepare themselves for it, ending the episode.

== Characters ==
The main characters from the show excluding Winona. From left to right: Sploshy, Terence, Reg, Tubb, Amelia, and Finbar.

=== Rubbadubbers ===
- Tubb (voiced by John Gordon Sinclair) is a toy frog who is the ringleader of the Rubbadubbers. He is admired by everyone for his cool attitude, but can sometimes get in over his head. He enjoys cleaning anything with his cotton bud and floating on a green lily pad.
- Sploshy (voiced by Maria Darling) is a toy starfish. She speaks with a childish English accent and is known to have a hot and short temper.
- Finbar (voiced by Sean Hughes) is a toy shark with an arrogant and self-centered attitude; he often refers to himself in third-person and enjoys playing games that involve pretend hunting and scaring. He is less of a menace than he lets on, being just as willing to play in games with the others. In the dream worlds, he usually plays the role of rivals or villains.
- Terence (voiced by John Gordon Sinclair) is a toy crocodile who is Amelia's closest friend. He can blow bubbles through his nostrils and dislikes getting splashed, often avoiding liquids and water altogether.
- Winona the Whale (vocal effects performed by Maria Darling) is a toy whale. She communicates by making squeaking sounds rather than speaking. She can also squirt water from her small blowhole.
- Reg (voiced by John Gordon Sinclair) is a toy robot who speaks with a distinctive stammer. Just like Terence, he avoids water, as simply getting splashed makes him short-circuit. He plays with the others but is always on the lookout for Benjie and Sis' presence in order to make the Rubbadubbers prepare themselves for bath time.
- Amelia (voiced by Maria Darling) is a toy submarine with retractable wings. Likely named after Amelia Earhart, she and the Rubbadubbers often call her 'the flying submarine'. She is very energetic (like Sploshy), rarely seen with a frown, loves to try new things, and takes great pleasure in flying around the bathroom and performing tricks.

=== Other ===
- Lawrence (voiced by John Gordon Sinclair) is Terence's imaginary friend in the episode "Terence's Double Trouble". He is exactly identical to Terence, only he has two teeth and a blue tie.
- Benjie and Sis are the two young owners of the Rubbadubbers. They are not seen or heard on-screen.

== Episodes ==
Series	Episodes	Originally released	
Series	Episodes	First released	Last released
1	13	2 September 2002	2 October 2002
2	13	17 February 2003	20 March 2003
3	13	3 May 2004	1 June 2004
4	13	15 January 2005	14 February 2005
Shorts	26	2 September 2003	18 September 2003

=== Series 1 (2002) ===
No. overall	No. in season	Title	Original release date
1	1	"Tubb the Pirate"	2 September 2002
After getting scared by a pirate's hat, Tubb wishes to become a pirate so he can never be scared. In his dream, he becomes the captain of a pirate ship. However, when he and his crew arrive on an island, they are shooed off by two pirates called Rusty Reg and Terrible Terence. When they begin to shoot cannonballs at them, they have to rely on bravery to save themselves.
2	2	"Terence's Double Trouble"	4 September 2002
Terence wishes to have a friend just like him after the Rubbadubbers do not want to play with him. In his dream, he meets Lawrence, a character who looks and acts the same as him. They instantly become friends, but when Lawrence starts to impress the Rubbadubbers with his tricks as well as getting all the attention, thus overshadowing Terence.
3	3	"Reg the Monster"	7 September 2002
Reg wants to finish his jigsaw puzzle in peace, so he becomes the "Leave Me Alone Monster" in his 'If Only-' sequence.
4	4	"Sploshy's Tail"	9 September 2002
Sploshy wants to do tail tricks like Winona, so she gets herself a weird-shaped tail.
5	5	"Tubb the Magician"	12 September 2002
Tubb sees Benjie's magic wand and wants to make things disappear for good, but it never works. Wishing that he was a magician, Tubb becomes just that in his dream. When he accidentally makes all his friends disappear, including Terence and Winona, he doesn't know how to get them back again. Luckily, Witch Sploshy saves the day after Tubb gives her the wand.
6	6	"Deep Sea Reg"	14 September 2002
Reg wishes he could have fun in the water with the others without malfunctioning, so in his dream, he is tasked with guarding the royal treasure of King Tubb and Queen Sploshy of the deep ocean. When they leave, Reg accidentally lets in Finbar the thief and allows him to steal the treasure. When he gets away, Reg has to chase him down before it's too late.
7	7	"Scary Finbar"	17 September 2002
After Finbar fails to scare any of his six friends, he wishes that he could scare them for real. When he dreams of becoming an even scarier version of himself, the others are just too scared to be with him, much to his disappointment.
8	8	"Train Driver Tubb"	19 September 2002
When the Rubbadubbers find Benjie and Sis' homemade model train lying about on the bathroom floor, they begin playing on it, with everyone playing a different role. But Tubb starts to do everything himself, which upsets the others. Wishing he was allowed to do so, in his dream, Tubb becomes the driver of a train carrying passengers and real gold in the safe. When the Mighty Train Robbers hijack the train, however, they take Tubb and his passengers as prisoners and tie them up, but when the speed lever breaks and the train goes full speed, Tubb has to stop the train from derailing.
9	9	"Sploshy of the Arctic"	21 September 2002
Sploshy transports herself to the Arctic after not wanting to cool off on a hot day.
10	10	"Sploshybird"	24 September 2002
After disrupting the Rubbadubbers' quiet time, Sploshy becomes a bird who makes noise when she moves, but she is captured by two sound-seekers along with Tubb and Reg who are also noise-making birds.
11	11	"Terence of Arabia"	26 September 2002
After being splashed, Terence transports himself to a desert, where there is not much water and he must find an oasis for the other Rubbadubbers.
12	12	"Speedy Terence"	29 September 2002
After losing a race thanks to being distracted, Terence wants to be fast, but he eventually realizes winning is not at all that important.
13	13	"Amelia the Babysitter"	2 October 2002
Amelia wants to be in charge, all because she does not want to be told what to do. After babysitting the other Rubbadubbers in a cloud world, she learns that being in charge is too much responsibility and sings the song "It's Never Ever Easy".

=== Series 2 (2003) ===
No. overall	No. in season	Title	Original release date
14	1	"Princess Amelia"	17 February 2003
After bumping her nose, Amelia wants everyone to worry about her when they all worry about Reg instead, so she becomes a princess, with her servants, Tubb and Finbar, worrying about her and not ever letting her out of her bedroom, when she realizes everyone worrying about her is actually quite a bad thing.
15	2	"Rocket Sled Reg"	20 February 2003
Reg wishes himself into having a faster sledge, but the sledge soon goes out of control in a crazy race.
16	3	"Terence the Shopkeeper"	22 February 2003
Terence is being possessive of the new, fancy, bubble bath and soap bottles in the bathroom, and becomes even more possessive in his dream of being a shopkeeper.
17	4	"Tubb the Frog Prince"	25 February 2003
After Tubb sees his friends read a fairy tale book, Tubb becomes a frog prince himself.
18	5	"Amelia and the Detectives"	27 February 2003
Amelia needs a detective to help her find her missing sponge, not realizing she put it away in the first place.
19	6	"Footballer Tubb"	3 March 2003
Tubb hates losing football games, so he wishes that he can win all the time. Note: This episode was retitled "Soccer Player Tubb" for North American broadcasts, being the only episode to receive one.
20	7	"Finbar the Star"	5 March 2003
Finbar becomes a movie star to get out of tidying up the bathroom.
21	8	"Spaceman Reg"	8 March 2003
Reg wants to go to the moon after not knowing about it, where he meets all the Rubbadubbers as aliens and helps them solve a low-gravity problem.
22	9	"Doctor Terence"	10 March 2003
Terence becomes a doctor to cheer his friends up and make them better.
23	10	"Super Amelia"	13 March 2003
After Amelia and Finbar try to go outdoors with each other, Amelia wishes herself into superhero training.
24	11	"Sploshy the Stoneseeker"	15 March 2003
Sploshy wants to collect stones after not sharing any with her friends.
25	12	"Sheriff Terence"	18 March 2003
Terence makes his own rules but runs into trouble when his own rules get the better of him in the wild, wild, west.
26	13	"Tubb's Cake Mistake"	20 March 2003
Tubb dislikes the pretend cake at a tea party, so he is transported to a cake shop to try real cake, but accidentally eats a cake meant for a competition.

=== Series 3 (2004) ===
No. overall	No. in season	Title	Original release date
27	1	"Finbar's Rescuers"	3 May 2004
Finbar does not want to be a rescuer in Sponge Rescue, so he wishes to be rescued instead.
28	2	"Finbar and the Green Hat Gang"	5 May 2004
Finbar sets certain requirements for anyone who wants to be in his gang.
29	3	"Terence the Spy"	8 May 2004
Terence wants to find out what his friends are planning for him, as it is a secret.
30	4	"Terence's Bubble Trouble"	10 May 2004
Terence does not want to run out of bubbles, so he wishes that everything he touches turns into bubbles.
31	5	"Finbar's Important Part"	13 May 2004
Finbar wants to join a band, but all the instruments are taken. He soon realizes something he has been taking for granted, with that being him as the singing role.
32	6	"Copy Sploshy"	15 May 2004
Sploshy wants everyone to copy her dance exactly, instead of adding their own moves. When she wishes herself to Copyland, everyone soon starts copying her constantly, including when Sploshy is not dancing.
33	7	"Reg's Game Plan"	18 May 2004
Reg does not have any new games in his memory banks, so he wishes himself to Game Land to think of something new.
34	8	"Farmer Sploshy"	20 May 2004
Sploshy wants to live on a farm and drive around on a tractor all day, but she ends up neglecting all of her duties.
35	9	"Little Red Riding Tubb"	22 May 2004
Tubb plays all the roles in a Little Red Riding Hood play, which leads to costume mishaps and stage hazards.
36	10	"Silly Sploshy"	25 May 2004
Sploshy is in a silly mood, and wants all the other Rubbadubbers to clown around with her when they are supposed to be building a tower.
37	11	"Terence's Ties"	27 May 2004
Terence wants new ties after Benjie and Sis rush off to buy new school uniforms.
38	12	"Reg In Squareworld"	30 May 2004
After Reg cannot draw a sun properly, he wishes himself into a square world, where circles are illegal.
39	13	"Amelia the Diver"	1 June 2004
Amelia has to dive to bring up Captain Terence's ship, the Jolly Bubble, from under the sea.

=== Series 4 (2005) ===
No. overall	No. in season	Title	Original release date
40	1	"Finbar's Gift"	15 January 2005
When the Rubbadubbers give each other Christmas gifts, Finbar wishes that he has all the presents on his own special day.
41	2	"Finbar and the Ghosts"	18 January 2005
After Finbar is unable to scare his friends with a scary story, he wishes himself to a school of ghosts.
42	3	"Sploshy's Wishes"	20 January 2005
After Sploshy's wish on a shooting star does not come true, she wishes for her own genie (that being Terence) to give her wishes in a dry, quiet oasis.
43	4	"Sporty Reg"	23 January 2005
After not winning the bathroom games, Reg wishes himself into Sports World to find out his real strengths.
44	5	"The House That Tubb Built"	26 January 2005
Tubb wants to build a house his way instead of following directions provided on a guide.
45	6	"Terence the Monster Hunter"	28 January 2005
When Terence sees Finbar dress up like a monster in the bathroom, he wishes that everyone believed him in that it was a real monster.
46	7	"Reg and the Library"	31 January 2005
Reg wants to read in peace, so he wishes himself to a library.
47	8	"Tuffty Tubb"	2 February 2005
Tubb wants to grow hair and styles it for a competition.
48	9	"Lighthouse Keeper Reg"	4 February 2005
Reg does not want to take a break from keeping watch for Benjie and Sis, so he wishes for his own lighthouse.
49	10	"Tubb's Towers"	6 February 2005
Tubb wants to run a hotel after trying and failing to read a letter from Benjie and Sis' grandmother in peace.
50	11	"Messenger Terence"	9 February 2005
Terence wants to be first with the news, so he becomes a colonial explorer delivering news to a village on an island.
51	12	"Skypainter Amelia"	11 February 2005
Amelia wants to make pictures like her friends, but she cannot hold her paintbrush right due to not having arms.
52	13	"Finbar The Word Shark"	14 February 2005
Finbar keeps losing a word game, so he wants to know all the words.

=== Mini Adventures (2003) ===
A series of twenty-six shorts, dubbed as Mini Adventures for DVD releases, were produced for North/Latin American broadcasts. While they never aired on television in the United Kingdom, twelve of the shorts were released on DVD.

No. overall	No. in season	Title	Original release date
1	1	"Can You Remember?"	5 September 2003
Reg, Terence, Amelia and Finbar play in Sploshy's memory game, where they have to remember and recall the objects hidden under her towel.
2	2	"All Wrapped Up"	5 September 2003
Sploshy finds a crocodile-shaped toothbrush that she wants to give to Terence. She tries to wrap it up in toilet paper, but she ends up wrapping herself in it too, with Tubb only making the situation worse. Terence ends up finding the toothbrush on his own, to the amusement of Sploshy (in spite of her disposition).
3	3	"Having a Ball"	9 September 2003
Terence ends up spilling a bunch of bath balls all over the floor, promoting the others to play with it like a basketball, or a volleyball, or a golf ball, or a football while helping clean up.
4	4	"Floaty Feather"	9 September 2003
A feather takes the eye of Terence who follows it curiously across the bathroom. A snoring, sleeping Finbar ends up blowing the feather up and away from Terence's reach; really it ends up on the back of Terence's tail. A defeated Terence goes to sleep, only for Finbar's snoring to disrupt the feather, their snoring causing the feather to bounce between the two, none the wiser.
5	5	"Drip!"	2 September 2003
The Rubbadubbers grow entranced by the dripping sink faucet, wondering if it will ever stop. Eventually, the drip is stopped forcibly by Reg, just as the sink begins to overflow. As Tubb drains the sink, the gang notice another drip growing from the bathtub, and they all run off to watch it.
6	6	"Hide and Seek"	2 September 2003
Winona, Tubb and Terence play a game of hide and seek, with Winona as finder. Before the game starts, Winona gets caught under a towel, forcing Tubb and Terence to search for her instead. Winona finds them first, but Tubb and Terence believe the towel is chasing them. In the chaos, Winona frees herself much to the relief of the three.
7	7	"What a Find"	8 September 2003
Reg finds a bubble wand, but is unsure of what it is. Tubb thinks of it as a banjo, while Terence gets caught in it and mistakes it for a net. The wand falls in the sink, and the group realise that its use is for blowing bubbles.
8	8	"Great Skate"	8 September 2003
Reg finds a toy skateboard. sploshy struggles to ride it while Tubb proves himself to be a natural, leaving her envious. After pulling off one too many tricks, Tubb wipes out and Sploshy is taken for a ride. Everyone is impressed by Sploshy's trick, but she is left pooped.
9	9	"Row Row Row"	4 September 2003
Tubb, Finbar and Sploshy rids in a rowboat, use popsicle sticks as oars. The three attempt to recite "Row, Row, Row Your Boat" with the help of Reg, but when they try to speed up their performance, things take a turn for the worse; much to their amusement.
10	10	"Steamy Mirror"	4 September 2003
While trying to fix the cap back on a toothpaste tube, Sploshy notices Terence drawing on a steamy mirror with his tail. She decides to make a caricature of Terence, but the steam soon clears out, leaving only his reflection.
11	11	"Clean and Groovy"	3 September 2003
The Rubbadubbers are forced to clean up the bathroom after it becomes too untidy. Tubb is adamant that cleaning up is not fun, but the other Rubbadubbers make a rhythm out of the chore and Tubb soon perks up, taking the role as conductor for the clean-up effort.
12	12	"Something Sticky"	3 September 2003
Tubb comes across a pile of clay on the bathroom floor that he can't get off his hand. He gets Terence's help in getting the sticky stuff off of their hands, and soon Terence's tail. When they do get it off, they inadvertently create a clay man, which Terence soon squashes.
13	13	"Swimmin'!!"	10 September 2003
Tubb finds a cotton swab and is inspired to hum a tune; with Winona and Finbar serving as dancers, Tubb takes on the role as conductor as they give a swimmin' performance.
14	14	"On a Roll"	10 September 2003
A pink bath ball fins its way around the bathroom while the Rubbadubbers tidy up. First Tubb finds it while searching for cotton swabs, only to drop it while climbing the sink; then it splashes into the bathtub - and right out again with the help of Winona and Sploshy. It bounces off of Reg, then by Terence and Finbar, then off of Amelia's wings. Finally, the ball rolls up to Tubb once again as he puts it back with the others.
15	15	"Make or Break"	11 September 2003
Tubb and Finbar try and create a tower using building blocks, and later a tent. Winona, playing with a bath ball, knocks it down. The three are happy to have another chance to make something new.
16	16	"Nighty Night"	11 September 2003
The Rubbadubbers prepare to go to sleep, but end up keeping each other up from saying good night to each other.
17	17	"Who Am I?"	18 September 2003
The Rubbadubbers play a game of Guess Who.
18	18	"Music Box"	18 September 2003
The Rubbadubbers come across a music box.
19	19	"Swimming Races"	12 September 2003
Finbar challenges Winona and Amelia to a swimming race. Amelia wins the first round, but flies instead of swimming. The next round, Amelia dives underwater and wins again. The final round, everyone swims and ends in a tie; Finbar proves to be a sore loser at first, but Amelia makes him realise that it was a fair race after all.
20	20	"Shadows"	12 September 2003
The Rubbadubbers play with shadows.
21	21	"Sploshy Says"	17 September 2003
Sploshy finshes cleaning up the bathtub, only to find a mess on the bathroom floor. She recruits the help of Amelia, Finbar and Winona to help clean the water up with towels as a Simon Says-esque game.
22	22	"Walk the Rack"	17 September 2003
After Benjie and Sis leave the bath rack over the sink, Tubb and Sploshy pretend to be knights and dub the rack "The Bridge of Doom". Terence and Reg are excited to play, but soon find themselves stuck over the bottomless sink, too afraid to move. It takes a spook from Tubb to get them across, much to the disappointment of Finbar.
23	23	"Pass It On"	16 September 2003
Tubb comes up with a great new game, and asks Winona to pass it on to the others. As each of the Rubbadubbers pass on Tubb's message, it gets more mixed up, and they all end up at a splash-shaped mat to play a different game. Tubb is upset that no one got his message but is more than willing to play the new game.
24	24	"Making Tracks"	16 September 2002
Finbar discovers a unique set of tracks of toothpaste made on the floor. It couldn't have been Winona or Amelia; they don't have feet. Reg's tracks are too square, Tubb's are too long, and Terence's are too round to match. The only tracks that match are Sploshy - on stilts! She'd made the tracks on purpose to clean it up.
25	25	"Being Choosy"	15 September 2003
Amelia helps Reg and Finbar find their own soaps after getting stuck arguing over one. The two find soaps that look just like each other.
26	26	"Xylophone"	15 September 2003
Terence finds a small xylophone in the hallway and performs the show's theme song. Finbar, Tubb, Winona and Sploshy sing along to the melody, coming up with their own lyrics (except for Winona, who still squeaks along to the tune).

== Release ==
=== Home media ===
==== United Kingdom ====
HIT Entertainment released three DVD and VHS volumes of the series. "Here Come the Rubbadubbers" was released on 12 May 2003. "Splish! Splash! Splosh!" was released on 1 September 2003 and "Bathtime Scramble" was released on 23 February 2004. Each release contains four episodes, with the first two releases also containing some of the shorts. The three DVDs were reissued as part of a boxset on 12 March 2007, while an additional release, "Swimmin'", was released as a Carry Case DVD on 9 April 2007.

==== United States ====
HIT Entertainment released four DVD and VHS volumes of the series, titled "Here Come the Rubbadubbers" on 27 January 2004, "Tubb's Pirate Treasure" on 16 March 2004, "High Noon in the Bathroom" on 13 July 2004 and "Finbar, the Mighty Movie Star" on 12 October 2004. Each release contained five episodes.
