= Richard Fox (chef) =

American celebrity chef

Richard Fox is a celebrity chef, broadcaster and writer. He is known as the Beer Chef. He wrote his first book, The Food and Beer Cook Book, in 2008, has led Beer and Food Masterclasses, demos and shows across Europe and hosted a gourmet beer banquet at the British Ambassador's residence in Paris and writes a Beer Chef column in Maxim. He lives in Harrogate.

Together with his friend Neil Morrissey, he has developed a range of beers under the name Morrissey Fox. In 2010 they made the ITV series Men Brewing Badly which documented their road journey from Dar es Salaam to Johannesburg transporting a batch of English beer destined for the English football supporters during the 2010 World Cup. As a teenager Richard fancied being a Bruce Lee and took up Shukokai Karate.
