= HOT Animation =

British animation studio

- Type: Private
- Industry: Media; Television production
- Founded: 16 September 1997; 29 years ago
- Founder: Jackie Cockle; Brian Little; Joe Dembinski
- Defunct: 18 August 2012; 14 years ago (14 years, 11 months and 2 days)
- Fate: Dissolved
- Headquarters: Manchester, England
- Key people: Jackie Cockle; Brian Little; Joe Dembinski
- Products: Children's television series Stop motion
- Total assets: $1,119 million
- Number of employees: 67 (2007)
- Parent: HIT Entertainment

HOT Animation was a British stop-motion animation studio owned by HIT Entertainment that specialized in stop-motion animation.

== History ==
The studio was first incorporated in September 1997, and was officially established on 1 April 1998 by former Cosgrove Hall Films employees Jackie Cockle, Brian Little, and Joe Dembinski. They started with producing the last four episodes of Brambly Hedge, a series of 25-minute episodes based on the eight illustrated children's books by Jill Barklem.

Their worldwide success did not follow until the creation of Bob the Builder, a British animated television series which follows general contractor Bob and the Can-Do-Crew of building vehicles. The theme tune was released as a single, "Can We Fix It?" with an accompanying promo produced at HOT, which beat Kylie Minogue's "Please Stay", Eminem's "Stan", and Westlife's "What Makes a Man" among others to become the Christmas number-one single.

The company then made Rubbadubbers, a series about bath toys that come alive. Pingu, a Swiss-British animated series about a family of penguins, was recreated with great success from 2003 to 2006.

HOT stopped to produce the main series of Bob the Builder after 2008 when the studio announced that jobs would be cut, and opted to produce a direct-to-DVD series called Bob the Builder: On Site, using stop-motion from Bob's world and live-action from real-world construction sites. The studio closed prior to HIT's purchase by Mattel, but was fully dissolved on 18 August 2012.

== Productions ==
=== Television ===
- Brambly Hedge (1998–2000, episodes 5–8 only)
- Bob the Builder (1999–2008, seasons 1–16 only)
- Rubbadubbers (2002–2005)
- Pingu (2003–2006, seasons 5–6 only)
- The Pingu Show (2006–2007)

=== Feature-length specials ===
- Bob the Builder: A Christmas to Remember (2001)
- Bob the Builder: The Knights of Can-A-Lot (2003)
- Bob the Builder: Snowed Under - The Bobblesburg Winter Games (2004)
- Bob the Builder - Project Build It: When Bob Became a Builder (2005)
- Bob the Builder - Project Build It: Built to Be Wild (2006)
- Bob the Builder - Project Build It: Scrambler to the Rescue (2007)
- Bob the Builder - Project Build It: Race to the Finish (2008)

=== Direct-to-home video ===
- Bob the Builder: On Site (2008–2011)

=== Music videos ===
- "Can We Fix It?" (2000)
- "Mambo No. 5" (2001)
- "Eskimo Disco - 7-11" (2006)
- "Big Fish, Little Fish" (2008)

=== Other ===
- Dinosaur Roar (1999, pilot for HIT Entertainment)
- Gina and Stella (2001, short film)
- Bitziboos (2004, pilot for HIT Entertainment)
- Life on Mars (2007, Camberwick Green parody sequence for season 2 episode 5)
