= Triggermen =

- Film poster
- Directed by: John Bradshaw
- Screenplay by: Tony Johnston
- Story by: Mark Thomas
- Produced by: Deborah Kiss; Sabine Mueller
- Starring: Pete Postlethwaite; Neil Morrissey; Adrian Dunbar; Donnie Wahlberg
- Cinematography: Barry Stone
- Edited by: Lisa Grootenboer
- Music by: Terence Gowan; Blair Packham
- Production company: First Look International
- Distributed by: Franchise Pictures
- Release dates: July 26, 2002 (München Fantasy Filmfest)
- Running time: 96 minutes
- Countries: Germany; Canada; United States
- Language: English
- Budget: $12,000,000.00 (est)

Triggermen is a 2002 crime comedy film written by Tony Johnston and Mark Thomas and directed by John Bradshaw for First Look International. Starring Pete Postlethwaite, Neil Morrissey, Adrian Dunbar, and Donnie Wahlberg, the film had festival and video screenings in 2002 and 2003 before its DVD premiere in 2004 and television releases in 2007 and 2008. Set in Chicago, the film was shot in Toronto.

== Plot ==
Pete Maynard (Neil Morrissey) and Andy Jarrett (Adrian Dunbar) are two con men down on their luck. They are holed up in a Chicago boarding room with their landlady harassing them for her long overdue rent. While attempting to scam someone he thinks is a businessman, Pete intercepts a briefcase full of cash intended for mobsters Terry Malloy (Donnie Wahlberg) and Tommy O'Brian (Michael Rapaport) as a payoff for a planned hit, as well as a key to a swank hotel room.

In the hotel room, Pete and Andy meet up with Terry and Tommy as the latter await their money. They then have to convince a local mob boss, Franco D'Amico (Louis Di Bianco), that they are in fact the hitmen hired to kill competing mob boss Ben Cutler (Pete Postlethwaite). At the same time that Cutler is trying to track down the missing money, mobster Terry falls for Emma Cutler (Claire Forlani), unaware that her father is the man he was supposed to kill.

== Cast ==
- Neil Morrissey as Pete Maynard
- Adrian Dunbar as Andy Jarrett
- Pete Postlethwaite as Ben Cutler
- Donnie Wahlberg as Terry Malloy
- Michael Rapaport as Tommy O'Brian
- Saul Rubinek as Jazzer
- Amanda Plummer as Penny Archer
- Claire Forlani as Emma Cutler
- Peter Mensah as Boxer
- Bill MacDonald as Boots
- James Collins as Johnny
- Louis Di Bianco as Franco D'Amico

== Critical reception ==
The Daily Telegraph wrote that despite its billing as a comedy thriller, the film was "neither noticeably comic nor remotely thrilling." After its US premiere at the Fort Lauderdale International Film Festival, Variety made note of the film seeming to "borrow heavily" from Lock, Stock and Two Smoking Barrels, and called it a "late, lame entry in the comic assassin genre". They offered that while the cast choices were fine, they were "generally wasted" and that the film, "lacking equally in humor and action, looks headed directly to home vid and cable." In agreement, Film4 wrote that the cast choices were reasonable, but the film might have been better if in other directorial hands. They considered its soundtrack inappropriate and the director's use of slow motion or high-speed for certain scenes as an unsuccessful lending of style, making it look "ridiculous and cheap, like a poor man’s Lock, Stock And Two Smoking Barrels." They wrote "A comedy-thriller short on laughs and thrills, Triggermen is a rather misjudged film" that used a "Ridiculous plot, second-rate acting and the stylisation of The Benny Hill Show." The Tribune made note that as the film's writer and director were both Canadian, they did a "poor job persuading us that Postlethwaite is a key player on the South Side." Sunday Mercury also panned the film, calling it a "weak farce with an intrusive soundtrack", but unlike Variety and Film 4, they offered that it was "beautifully framed and shot", while speaking well toward Neil Morrissey lead role, but they opined that he had "little hope of saving this unconvincing, dull, limp, flat, laughter-free comedy caper." Entertainment.ie also noted weak comparisons of the film to Lock, Stock and Two Smoking Barrels and Pulp Fiction, and offered that such was "probably affording Triggermen too much respect." They called the plot a "distressingly inane story" and one of those "hopeless juvenile, depressingly formulaic Brit comedies which owes its very existence to Guy Ritchie." Raidió Teilifís Éireann wrote of the film, "Without a speck of originality, intelligence or humour, 'Triggermen' is all a bit aimless."

Conversely, Time Out Film Guide offered that the director's "decently crafted script" was a "watchable, bland comedy" "only slightly more hit than miss." They offered that Neil Morrissey's performance "just about carries the film" and that it was Amanda Plummer's "intense" performance that acted as the film's "saving grace".

== Release ==
The film had its U.S. premiere at the Fort Lauderdale International Film Festival. It screened in the United Kingdom in 2003, and as Cine apasa pe tragaci? in Romania, and had a DVD premiere in Netherlands and the US in 2004, and television airings in Sweden in 2007 and as Balfék balhé in Hungary in 2008. In Brazil it aired as Correndo Atrás do Amor.
