= Men Behaving Badly =

British TV sitcom (1992–1998)

- Created by: Simon Nye
- Written by: Simon Nye
- Directed by: Martin Dennis
- Starring: Martin Clunes; Neil Morrissey; Leslie Ash; Caroline Quentin; Harry Enfield
- Country of origin: United Kingdom
- Original language: English
- No. of series: 6
- No. of episodes: 42 (list of episodes)

Production
- Producer: Beryl Vertue
- Running time: 30 minutes
- Production company: Hartswood Films in association with Thames

Original release
- Network: ITV
- Release: 18 February – 13 October 1992
- Network: BBC One
- Release: 1 July 1994 – 28 December 1998

Related
- Men Behaving Badly (American TV series)

Men Behaving Badly is a British sitcom that was created and written by Simon Nye. It follows the lives of Gary Strang (Martin Clunes) and his flatmates Dermot Povey (Harry Enfield; series 1 only) and Tony Smart (Neil Morrissey; series 2 onwards). It was first broadcast on ITV in 1992, before moving to BBC One in 1994. From 1992 to 1998 there were six series, a Christmas special and a trilogy of episodes that make up the feature-length finale "Last Orders".

Filming locations included Ellerton Road in Surbiton, which was used for the exterior of Gary and Tony's house, and Eaton Rise in Ealing, which was used for the back garden. The setting, however, is implied to be South London, and many references are made to Surrey. It was produced by Hartswood Films in association with Thames for the first two series on ITV. They also assisted with production of the third series onwards that aired on the BBC, after Thames had lost their regional ITV franchise for London at the end of 1992 to Carlton Television.

Men Behaving Badly became highly successful after being moved to a post-watershed slot on BBC One. It won the Comedy Awards' best ITV comedy and the first National Television Award for Situation Comedy.

== Plot summary ==
Gary and Dermot are two London-based, beer-guzzling flatmates who typically spend most of their time in front of the television or in pursuit of women. When Deborah, an attractive single woman, moves into the flat above, both men become obsessed with her, despite Gary already having a steady girlfriend, Dorothy.

When series two begins, it is revealed Dermot has left to travel the world, leading Gary to look for a new flatmate. Record stall owner Tony Smart then moves in and, although Gary is unsure of him at first, the two soon become good friends, revelling in a second childhood, hours of TV and mindless talks about women. Tony quickly becomes obsessed with Deborah and, unlike with Dermot, she initially shows an interest in return. However, Tony's immaturity quickly drives her to distraction, and his pursuit of Deborah becomes increasingly one-sided.

Gary manages an office selling security equipment for a dead-end company. His staff of ageing employees are the meek George and lifelong spinster Anthea, who regularly drive him to frustration with their old-fashioned views. Tony stumbles through a range of jobs including as a model, barman, mime artist and postman, after his record stall (literally) collapses.

Dorothy is an intelligent and mature nurse, and it is stated one of the main reasons she went out with Gary was because he annoyed her parents. She and Gary frequently split up and are occasionally unfaithful, including one night when Dorothy sleeps with Tony, but they always end up back together. Tony has many girlfriends but his true feelings are for Deborah, whom he initially just wants to have sex with, but quickly falls in love with, in spite of her generally poor treatment of him. Deborah is often disappointed by Tony's juvenile behaviour, but can also see his good side. The two finally end up in a relationship in series six.

Although Dorothy initially dislikes Deborah (disparagingly referring to her as "Miss Wet Dream" in series two), the two bond over their shared frustration at the two men and develop a strong friendship, eventually becoming flatmates themselves.

== Cast ==
- Martin Clunes plays Gary Strang, manager of a security sales office with two old-fashioned, middle-aged subordinates. He owns the flat that he shares with Dermot, and later Tony. He is in a long-term, albeit off-and-on, relationship with Dorothy. Gary is in his 30s but also is arrogant and a little immature, which frequently annoys Dorothy.
- Harry Enfield (series 1) plays Dermot Povey, Gary's original flatmate. Dermot is forever failing to pay his rent and is desperately in love with Deborah. He leaves for a round-the-world motorbike tour. Unlike Tony, Dermot seems to come from a similar background to Gary.
- Neil Morrissey (series 2–6) plays Tony Smart, Gary's womanising flatmate, who is infatuated with Deborah. He is well meaning but has a habit of annoying those around him with his thoughtless comments and off-the-wall behaviour. He also has musical ambitions which are not matched by his abilities.
- Leslie Ash plays Deborah Burton, an attractive blonde woman who lives in the flat above Gary and Tony. Deborah works in a restaurant, and although attracted to Tony, his immaturity, devil-may-care attitude and other aspects of his character push her away.
- Caroline Quentin plays Dorothy Martin/Bishop, Gary's outspoken girlfriend. She is a nurse who initially lives with her parents, before moving in with Gary and Tony in series five. She later makes friends with Deborah, eventually becoming her flatmate.
- Ian Lindsay plays George, an employee with old fashioned views at Gary's security firm. George is married to the unseen Marjorie, with whom he has a son.
- Valerie Minifie plays Anthea, an employee at Gary's security firm with views similar to George. Anthea is a lifelong spinster.
- Dave Atkins (series 1–4) plays Les, the landlord of The Crown, Gary and Tony's local pub, who is briefly Tony's boss. His appalling hygiene standards are matched by the run down and unkempt nature of the pub.
- John Thomson (series 5–6) plays Ken, Les' successor as landlord of The Crown. He knows nothing about the pub trade, admitting he got the job because his brother-in-law was sleeping with the personnel officer at the brewery, and his attempts to modernise the pub are undermined by his lack of experience in the role. He is also briefly Tony's boss.

== Episodes ==
The show aired for six series and 42 episodes, including a Christmas special titled "Jingle Balls", which was broadcast at Christmas 1997. A final short run of three 45-minute episodes was made in 1998 to conclude the series.

Series one was the only series to feature Harry Enfield as Dermot, before Neil Morrissey joined the cast as Tony. The first two series' episodes run for about 24 minutes due to airing on ITV with time needed for advertisements. After moving to the BBC, episodes run about four minutes longer.

== Production ==
Men Behaving Badly is based on Simon Nye's 1989 book of the same title. Producer Beryl Vertue first considered it for a film before deciding it was suited for television adaptation. Harry Enfield, already a well-known comedian, was cast first. He had seen Martin Clunes perform in a play and recommended him for the other lead.

Enfield felt out of place in the sitcom and announced he was leaving after the first series. (Note: Vertue has since said that Enfield never intended to stay for more than one series.) When Thames Television found out, their immediate reaction was to end the series, and they had to be persuaded to put on a second series, with Neil Morrissey replacing Enfield. After Thames lost their television franchise, ITV decided that a peak viewing figure of seven million was insufficient and withdrew support. Incensed, Vertue approached the BBC, who agreed to broadcast the show.

In 1994, the BBC aired the first of a further four series. The shift to a new station and a later time slot meant, as the BBC claimed, the show could indulge in "more colourful language and behaviour". The show became highly successful on BBC1, drawing a cult following.

Since purchasing the rights to the first two series from ITV, the BBC have repeated the second series (the first featuring Morrissey), though the first series (featuring Enfield) has never been shown on the BBC.

In 2002, it was revealed that Simon Nye and the cast had agreed to revive the series for three further specials the following year, in which Vertue wanted the show to focus on how Gary and Dorothy were coping with parenthood. The idea was shelved the following year after Caroline Quentin became pregnant. In October 2014, Clunes and Morrissey returned to the characters of Gary and Tony for the first time since 1998 in a sketch for Channel 4's "The Feeling Nuts Comedy Night" and Stand Up to Cancer telethon.

In October 2024, the BBC announced that Neil Morrissey and Martin Clunes were set to reunite for a new travel series titled Neil & Martin’s Bon Voyage, which would feature their road trip across France, exploring local culture and cuisine while reminiscing about their 30-year friendship. This was broadcast in three weekly episodes on U&Gold in March and April 2025.

== Reception ==
A BBC article suggests that Gary and Tony were "a reaction against the onset of the caring, sharing 'new man'. It appeared to revel in a politically incorrect world of booze, burps and boobs". Critics Jon Lewis and Penny Stempel have stated that the show "allowed male viewers to indulge in vicarious laddism, whilst allowing female viewers to ridicule the bad but lovable Tony and Gary". They further commented that "it was also a genuine sitcom in that the humour came from the characters and their context". Simon Nye remarked: "I don't do mad, plot-driven farragoes. You have to allow your characters time to talk."

Men Behaving Badly boosted the acting careers of all four of the main cast. The final episode in 1998 drew 13.9 million viewers. The show was criticised by the Royal Society for the Prevention of Accidents for its portrayal of a "lad's culture of boozing and irresponsibility".

== Book and audio releases ==
A companion guide to the show, The A–Z of Behaving Badly was released on 1 November 1995. It features many handy tips from Gary and Tony and was written by Simon Nye. On 27 July 2000, two audio compilations were released featuring eight shows from series three and four.

A script book entitled The Best of Men Behaving Badly was released on 5 October 2000. It contains 25 of the 42 scripts, along with some new material, black and white pictures, and introductions by Simon Nye.

== Stage play ==
In 2025 Simon Nye revealed he had written a Men Behaving Badly play that was due to begin in 2026. The play debuted at The Barn Theatre in Cirencester in January 2026 and ran until March 2026.

== Home media ==
All six series are available on region 2 DVD separately, and a complete collection featuring all six series is also available. The 1997 Christmas special and final trilogy 'Last Orders!' are also available on DVD.

While the rest of the series was shot in 4:3, the 3 episodes making up 'Last Orders!' are the only ones filmed in widescreen. However, the episodes are cropped for the DVD release. Owing to licensing difficulties, the music at the beginning of episode one 'Hair' and the rave in episode five 'Cardigan' had to be changed for the Series 5 DVD.

Prior to March 2025, the entire series was available on Netflix UK, featuring the original broadcast episodes now licensed by BBC Studios. The episode "Jingle Balls!/The Big Christmas Box" is listed as the 7th episode of Series 6 under the title "Merry Christmas". "Last Orders!" is available to view in widescreen for the first time since broadcast.

DVD Title	Discs	Year	Episodes	DVD release dates		
DVD Title	Discs	Year	Episodes	Region 1	Region 2	Region 4
Complete Series 1	1	1992	6	25 January 2005	8 May 2000	14 August 2000
Complete Series 2	1	1992	6	25 January 2005	5 June 2000	14 August 2000
Complete Series 3	1	1994	6	10 January 2006	5 June 2000	14 August 2000
Complete Series 4	1	1995	7	10 January 2006	3 July 2000	14 August 2000
Complete Series 5	1	1996	7	7 November 2006	3 July 2000	14 August 2000
Complete Series 6	1	1997	6	7 November 2006	20 November 2000	14 August 2000
Jingle Balls!	1	1997	1	On "Last Orders" DVD	1 January 2008	—N/a
Last Orders	1	1998	3	7 November 2006	1 September 2003	14 August 2000
Complete Series 1–6	6	1992–1997	38	—N/a	22 September 2003	September 2020
Complete Series 1–LO	8	1992–1998	42	7 November 2006	29 October 2012	8 August 2001

== American version ==
The series was remade for American television, broadcast on NBC 1996–1997, and starred Rob Schneider, Ken Marino, Ron Eldard and Justine Bateman. The humour was not appreciated by American audiences and the remake was cancelled after two seasons. The original series was eventually screened in the United States on BBC America as British Men Behaving Badly. In Australia, where the British version was screened under its original title on the ABC, the American series was broadcast as It's a Man's World on the Seven Network.

== Awards ==
Year	Category	Nominated for	Result	Ref.
1996	RTS Awards	Situation Comedy and Comedy Drama	Won	
