= Cluedo (British game show) =

British television game show (1990–1993)

- Genre: Game show
- Presented by: James Bellini (1990); Chris Tarrant (1991); Richard Madeley (1992–1993)
- Voices of: Charles Foster
- Composers: Richard G. Mitchell; Kevin Malpass
- Country of origin: United Kingdom
- Original language: English
- No. of series: 4
- No. of episodes: 25 (inc. 1 Xmas special) (list of episodes)

Production
- Running time: 30 minutes (inc. adverts); 50 minutes (Xmas special)
- Production companies: Granada in association with Waddingtons Games and Action Time

Original release
- Network: ITV
- Release: 25 July 1990 – 24 May 1993

Cluedo is a British game show based on the board game of the same name. Each week, a reenactment of the murder at the stately home Arlington Grange of a visiting guest was played and, through a combination of interrogating the suspects (of whom only the murderer could lie) and deduction, celebrity guests had to discover who committed the murder, which of six weapons (not usually the original six from the board game) and in which room it was committed, whilst viewers were invited to play along at home.

== Production ==
The TV show is similar to an earlier detective fiction programme named Whodunnit?, where audience members had to guess the identity of the culprit after viewing prerecorded footage and interrogating suspects. The Doctors Who's Who describes Whodunnit? as a celebrity quiz show "not unlike Cluedo...where the panel would see some visual clues and a piece of film and decide who killed whom and in what capacity". Dalek I Loved You described Whodunnit? as "an earlier version of Cluedo".

David McCallum, who played Professor Plum in series 2, said "This is not the Royal Shakespeare Company but it still requires technique. It's not overacting and it's not underacting. it's just slightly over the top". Series three's Colonel Mustard Lewis Collins said in an interview with This Morning: "Cluedo is the most nerve-racking thing I've ever done...", despite one magazine saying he was "tailor-made" for the role. Lysette Anthony, who played Miss Scarlett in series 3, said "Cluedo is fun to play because it's camp and it's the complete opposite of what I'm about".

Leslie Grantham, series four's Colonel Mustard, said "I'm the last person you'd expect to play [him]. That's why I was so flattered to be offered the role", and added that "Cluedo is great fun to do. It's fascinating to watch these asexual, inanimate characters brought to life". Despite the notion that the Colonel's prior occupation would make him the obvious suspect for every murder, it is stressed that "everyone has equally good reasons for bumping off the victim". Joan Sims, who played Mrs White in the 1990 Christmas special, would reprise her role in the 1995 Cluedo CD-I game.

Arley Hall, in Cheshire, was chosen for filming as it had a "near perfect layout of downstairs rooms" that the game of Cluedo requires. Built in 1744, Arley Hall was privately owned and had become a major tourist attraction since it was opened to the public in 1962. Producer Mark Gorton explained, "the floorplan lends itself to the boardgame very well and that was a major consideration when choosing the location". The Cheshire mansion was only 18 miles from the Granada studios in Manchester where the live portions were taped, and open the public only at certain times of the year, both of which made filming easier. The house had to be furnished to fit the 1930s period that the show is set in, while some original furniture was deemed "ideal for the programme"; Gorton noted, ”as far as the owners were concerned, as long as the items weren’t too valuable we were free to use them".

A Billiard Room had to be constructed as Arlington lacked one, which was created in a front drawing room with props including a billiard table, scoring devices, and cues. A huge table was added to the Dining Room with a series of gothic high-backed chairs; Gorton noted, "we also added a variety of strange stuffed animals to lend to it a kind of Addams Family feel". In contrast, the Library needed little attention to appear on screen, while the Study needed little alteration besides triptychs and a Bakelite telephone. In later series the Kitchen was a mock-up created in a spare room, as the real kitchen was in use for visitors to Arley Hall and production decided it "felt...too modern for us". The props team brought in an Aga, refrigerator, pine table, a rack of pheasants, and sharp kitchen implements. The Drawing Room "fitted the bill perfectly" due to its "unusual gothic fireplaces" which featured leaping gargoyles and furnishings like oil paintings, however high-backed furniture with lions paw feet was added.

== Format ==
Each episode starts with the host introducing the 6 possible weapons that change with each episode, and the same suspects and rooms. Then a prerecorded scenario plays out which culminates in the murder of a guest at Arlington Grange. This is followed by the studio sleuths cross-examining the characters to uncover further information. When one team succeeds, a spotlight shines on the culprit as they explain how and why they committed the crime. Despite the episode ending with one of the suspects confessing to murder, all six would return in the next episode as if nothing had happened.

== Cast ==
Character	Series 1 (1990)	Christmas Special (1990)	Series 2 (1991)	Series 3 (1992)	Series 4 (1993)
Mrs. Elizabeth Peacock	Stephanie Beacham	Kate O'Mara	Rula Lenska	Susan George	Joanna Lumley
Col. Mike Mustard	Robin Ellis	David Robb	Michael Jayston	Lewis Collins	Leslie Grantham
Rev. Jonathan Green	Robin Nedwell	Derek Nimmo	Richard Wilson	Christopher Biggins	Nicholas Parsons
Prof. Peter Plum	Kristoffer Tabori	Ian Lavender	David McCallum	Tom Baker	John Bird
Ms. Vivienne Scarlett	Tracy Louise Ward	Toyah Willcox	Koo Stark	Lysette Anthony	Jerry Hall
Mrs. Blanche White	June Whitfield	Joan Sims	Mollie Sugden	Pam Ferris	Liz Smith

== Episodes ==
Series	Episodes	Originally released	
Series	Episodes	First released	Last released
1	6	25 July 1990	29 August 1990
Christmas Special		26 December 1990	
2	6	24 April 1991	5 June 1991
3	6	4 May 1992	8 June 1992
4	6	19 April 1993	24 May 1993

== Critical reception ==
Understanding the Global TV Format likened the show to Voce Decide, describing them both as "a hybrid, an amalgamation of a gameshow with a fictional situation and story". Similarly, The A to Z of Australian Radio and Television deemed the Australian version a "hybrid gameshow/whodunnit". One magazine said the show "promise[s] to keep us guessing till the very end". One magazine noted the difficulties involved in giving life to a one-dimensional character "when the only source material they have to work on comes out of a small cardboard box". One magazine noted the "high level of talent the show can attract", putting it down to Cluedo being a game that most households (including those of celebrities) grew up with. Cluedo fansite Cluedofan deemed it "an absolutely brilliant TV gameshow".

On his stint as host, Chris Tarrant was later quoted as saying, "I absolutely hated hosting Cluedo; it's the worst thing I've ever done. It took forever to make the thing. We used to have to turn the studio audience over just to make sure they didn't get any bed sores."

=== Controversy ===
In the second episode of the fourth season, Col. Mike Mustard murdered former comrade and property developer Sir Nigel Hussey (Ian McNeice) with a G-string in the kitchen. A short time after the episode aired, the producers received a letter that was written by the family of one Felix Reese, who himself was a taxi driver who was shot in the head by Leslie Grantham (the actor playing Col. Mustard) while the future star of EastEnders was a soldier stationed in Germany. The Reeses found it distasteful that someone who performed an illegal killing as a soldier would be cast as someone who performed an illegal killing as a soldier. Matthew Wright from The Sun asked Grantham about the "irony" of this turn at a press conference, which angered the actor.

== International versions ==
Country	Name	Presenter(s)	Channel	Date of transmission
Australia	Cluedo	Ian McFadyen	Nine Network; WIN Network	1992–1993
France	Cluedo	Christian Morin; Marie-Ange Nardi	France 3	1994–1995
Germany	Cluedo – Das Mörderspiel	Gundis Zámbó	Sat. 1	1998
Italy	Il delitto è servito	Maurizio Micheli	Canale 5	1992–1993
Portugal	Cluedo	Rogério Samora	TVI	1995
Sweden	Cluedo – en mordgåta	Martin Timell	TV4	1996

=== Portugal ===
The Portuguese version lasted for one season in 1995 consisting of 13 episodes. The show was hosted by Rogério Samora. It premiered on 26 March 1995. It was produced by Cinemate, D&D Audiovisuais, and Televisão Independente (TVI). The show is reported to be a "very interesting novelty, despite having gone unnoticed." It has been deemed an "innovative contest".
