= Jill Barklem =

British illustrator and writer (1951–2017)

Jill Barklem (born Gillian Gaze; 23 May 1951 – 15 November 2017) was a British writer and illustrator of children's books. Her most famous work is the Brambly Hedge series, published from 1980.

== Early life ==
Jill Barklem was born as Gillian Gaze in Epping on 23 May 1951. She was the daughter of John and Ivy Gaze, who ran a family-owned department store in the town. She was educated at Loughton High School. When she was 13, she had an accident which resulted in a detached retina. As such, she was unable to take part in PE or games at school and instead developed her talent for drawing and art. On leaving school, she studied illustration at St Martin's in London.

== Illustrator ==
After graduating she became an illustrator for children's bibles and a series of collections of prayers and graces. Under her maiden name, she illustrated the Haffertee Hamster books by Janet and John Perkins.

Her husband suggested that she turn her ideas for a story about hedgerow life, conceived while commuting on the train journey to art school, into a book. Barklem used this time to research English customs, flora, and other geographical and cultural details for her Brambly Hedge stories.

The first four books were published in 1980, each representing one of the four seasons. These four were originally released as individual volumes in a miniature format. She wrote four more for the series, the last being published in 1994.

Barklem's books became immensely popular, selling over seven million copies worldwide and printed in over 13 languages. The Brambly Hedge characters went on to feature in merchandise, such as cards, Royal Doulton china, and a stop-motion animated series, The Enchanted World of Brambly Hedge (1996 to 2000).

== Family life and death ==
Jill married David Barklem, an antiques dealer, in 1977. The couple went on to have a son and a daughter.

She died of pneumonia aged 66 on 15 November 2017.

== Works ==
=== Brambly Hedge Series ===
- Spring Story (1980)
- Summer Story (1980)
- Autumn Story (1980)
- Winter Story (1980)
- The Secret Staircase (1983)
- The High Hills (1986)
- Sea Story (1990)
- Poppy's Babies (1994)

=== Collections ===
- The Four Seasons of Brambly Hedge (1988) contains the 4 seasonal titles and a 20-page "conversation" with the author about the origins and developments of the stories.
- Tales from Brambly Hedge (1997) contains the other 4 original titles: Staircase, Sea, Hills and Babies.
- Adventures of the Mice of Brambly Hedge (1998) is a joint publication version of Autumn Story and Sea Story.
- The Mice of Brambly Hedge Celebrate (1998) is a joint publication version of Winter Story and Secret Staircase.
- Outings for the Mice of Brambly Hedge (1999) is a joint publication version of Spring Story and The High Hills.
- Baby Mice in Brambly Hedge (1999) is a joint publication version of Summer Story and Poppy's Babies.
- A Visit to Brambly Hedge (2000) is a 20th anniversary special background information book.
- A Year In Brambly Hedge (2010) is a 30th anniversary special containing the 4 seasonal titles.

=== Brambly Hedge books by other authors ===
- Wilfred to the Rescue (2005) "In the spirit of Jill Barklem" Alan MacDonald (Author), Lizzie Sanders, botanical artist (Illustrator)
- Primrose In Charge (2006) "In the spirit of Jill Barklem" Alan MacDonald (Author), Lizzie Sanders, botanical artist (Illustrator)

=== Other ===
Activity and "Toy and Moveable" books, include Primrose's Adventure (Brambly Hedge Sliding Pictures) and Wilfred's Birthday Sliding Pictures; some board books, such as House for a Mouse, Nice for Mice, and The Snow Ball; and Poppy and Dusty's Wedding.
