= Neil Morrissey =

British actor, businessman, presenter and narrator (born 1962)

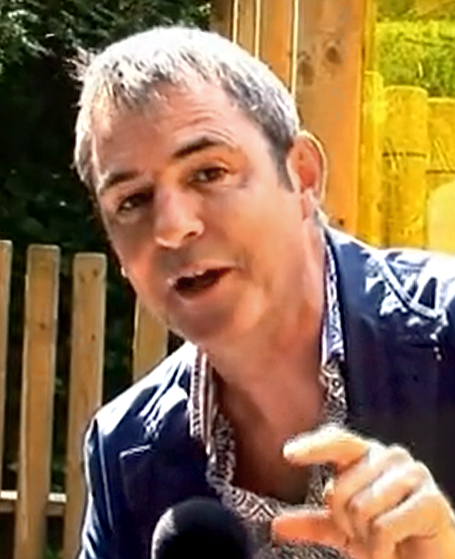
- Morrissey in 2011
- Born: Neil Anthony Morrissey; 4 July 1962 (age 64); Stafford, Staffordshire, England
- Occupations: Actor; businessman; narrator; presenter
- Years active: 1983–present
- Notable work: Men Behaving Badly; Bob the Builder; Waterloo Road
- Spouse: Amanda Noar (m. 1987; div. 1991)
- Children: 1

Neil Anthony Morrissey (born 4 July 1962) is an English actor, businessman, narrator, and television presenter. He is perhaps best known for his roles as Rocky in Boon and Tony in Men Behaving Badly. Other notable acting roles include Deputy Head Eddie Lawson in the BBC One school-based drama series Waterloo Road, Greg McConnell in The Good Karma Hospital and Nigel Morton in Line of Duty. Morrissey also provided the voices of Bob, Roley, Lofty, Farmer Pickles, and others in Bob the Builder, as well as singing the theme song.

== Early life ==
Morrissey was born in Stafford, Staffordshire on 4 July 1962, the third of four sons of Irish parents who were both psychiatric nurses. Neil, aged 10, and his brother Stephen, aged 12, stole sweets and stationery from a shop. In court, a magistrate issued a care order and the pair were sent to separate children's homes, Neil spending most of his time (six years) at Penkhull Children's Home, from 1974. under the care of Margaret Cartlidge.

"we were slightly feral, left to our own devices, getting into loads of trouble, burgling and vandalising stuff in Stafford"

He attended Thistley Hough Academy in Penkhull, where he passed all nine CSEs with O-Level-equivalent grades, despite purportedly being downgraded from taking GCE exams on account of his being raised in care. He went on to further study for his A-levels at the City of Stoke-on-Trent Sixth Form College.

Morrissey had developed his skills and reputation as an actor through his teenage years at Stoke Schools Theatre, Stoke Repertory Theatre, performing at the Edinburgh Fringe Festival in 1979. He further studied acting at the Guildhall School of Music and Drama, after receiving an educational grant, and he 'sofa-surfed' with friends, and performed street theatre, to survive first year.

== Career ==
=== Acting ===
In 1984, Morrissey, in his film debut, played Able Seaman Matthew Quintal in historical mariner drama The Bounty, alongside Mel Gibson, Anthony Hopkins and Laurence Olivier. In 1987, Morrissey rose to notoriety as dim biker Rocky in the ITV drama series Boon, alongside Michael Elphick. Many of the actors from Boon, were also involved in the 1990 British spoof horror film I Bought a Vampire Motorcycle, where he played the lead role of Noddy. In 1992, Morrissey took on the role of Tony in Men Behaving Badly, which was created to replace Harry Enfield's character Dermot, when Enfield departed after the first series. The series became one of the most popular UK sitcoms of the 90s and Morrissey became a national celebrity.

During the early 1990s he appeared as "Sammy the Chamois" in Noel Edmonds' Noel's House Party.

In 1998, Morrissey starred in the John Godber rugby league film Up 'n' Under. Neil also voiced Wilfred Toadflax and Dusty Dogwood in Brambly Hedge (1997), which was produced by HIT Entertainment. After this, Neil voiced several characters in the HIT Entertainment children's television series Bob the Builder, including the lead character, Bob, for over a decade between 1999 and 2011. During his voice acting role, he achieved two UK number 1 singles, with "Can We Fix It?" (which was the 2000 UK Christmas number one), and "Mambo No 5" in 2001. He later voiced Bob on a third single, "Big Fish Little Fish", in 2008. He later provided voice narration for Morph, and Maisy.

In 2000, Morrissey starred in TV comedy film Happy Birthday, Shakespeare, where he played a coach driver, in a cast that included Amanda Holden, Les Dennis, and Freddie Highmore. In 2002, Morrissey returned to TV screens in the drama series Paradise Heights, which ran for two series. He then had a starring role in the BBC sitcom Carrie and Barry from 2004 until 2005.

His work in West End theatre work includes Speed, Robin Hood, The Daughter In-Law and his critically acclaimed West End performance in A Passionate Woman. In 2005 Morrissey performed in Victoria Wood's musical adaptation of Acorn Antiques alongside Julie Walters, Celia Imrie, Duncan Preston and Josie Lawrence. Morrissey took over the role of Nathan Detroit from Nigel Lindsay in the London revival of Guys and Dolls from March to June 2006.

In 2007, he appeared in British TV show Skins, as Marcus Ainsworth, the father of Hannah Murray's character Cassie Ainsworth. He reprised the role in 2013, when appearing in both parts of Skins Pure. In 2007, he appeared in the BBC One school-based drama series, Waterloo Road as the new deputy headteacher, Eddie Lawson. In 2009, he left Waterloo Road after the fourth series.

In January 2012, Morrissey took on the role of Fagin in Lionel Bart's musical Oliver at the Palace Theatre in Manchester. Morrissey starred alongside Adrian Edmondson, Robert Webb and Miles Jupp in the play Neville's Island at Duke of York's Theatre, London during Autumn 2014.

In 2015, he played a character called Keith, who is Johnny (Joe Maw) and Tee's (Mia McKenna Bruce) villainous mother's former boyfriend, in the CBBC sitcom The Dumping Ground. In December 2015, Morrissey starred in BBC Two's comedy-drama A Gert Lush Christmas, playing the father of Russell Howard's character.

In 2016, he joined the cast of Grantchester for the second series, where he played the role of Harding Redmond. Also in 2016, he took part in the second series of ITV's reality series Bear Grylls: Mission Survive.

From 2017, Morrissey played Greg McConnell in ITV's The Good Karma Hospital, for several seasons until 2022. He portrayed Peter Carr in Series 3 of Unforgotten in 2018. In 2021, he starred as Frank Stevenson in series four of the BBC series The Syndicate, starring alongside Katherine Rose Morley. In 2023, he was the subject of DNA Journey with Adrian Dunbar.

Morrissey played the part of Captain Perrot, an accomplice of Colonel Blood, in The Crown Jewels, a humorous play written by screenwriter Simon Nye and performed at the Garrick Theatre in London in 2023, about Blood's theft of the Crown Jewels) in 1671. The part of Blood was played by Aidan McArdle, Al Murray played King Charles II, and the cast also included Mel Giedroyc.

=== Spoof show ===
On 1 April 2006, a BBC Three spoof programme titled Neil Morrissey's Secret documented sides of Morrissey's life that were previously unknown to the world at large. It alleged he has a house, wife and two children in Jordan, as well as a degree in botany, for which he had studied for 20 years. These studies were integral to his motivation to find a breakthrough in anti-ageing, which supposedly occurred naturally amongst the local population. It was said that he had invented a cream called The Essence which contains extracts of a plant found only in a remote Jordanian village. In the documentary the cream's acolytes include celebrities such as Jane Seymour, Gloria Hunniford and Philippa Forrester. The hoax documentary was launched on 1 April, and despite the suspicions caused by this date as April Fool's Day, it still managed to convince some people that it was true.

=== Business ===
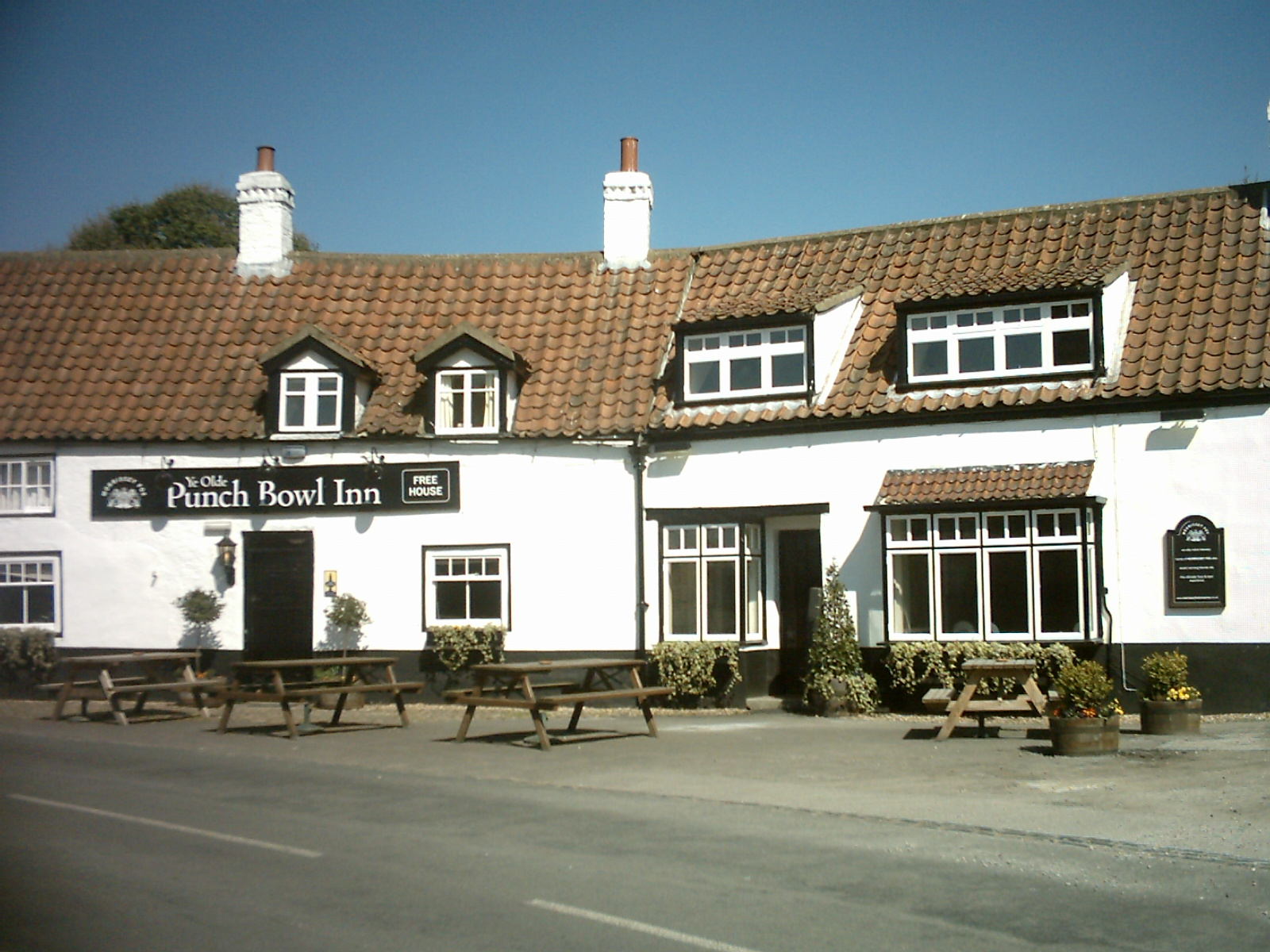
Ye Olde Punch Bowl Inn, the lease of which was part-owned by Morrissey

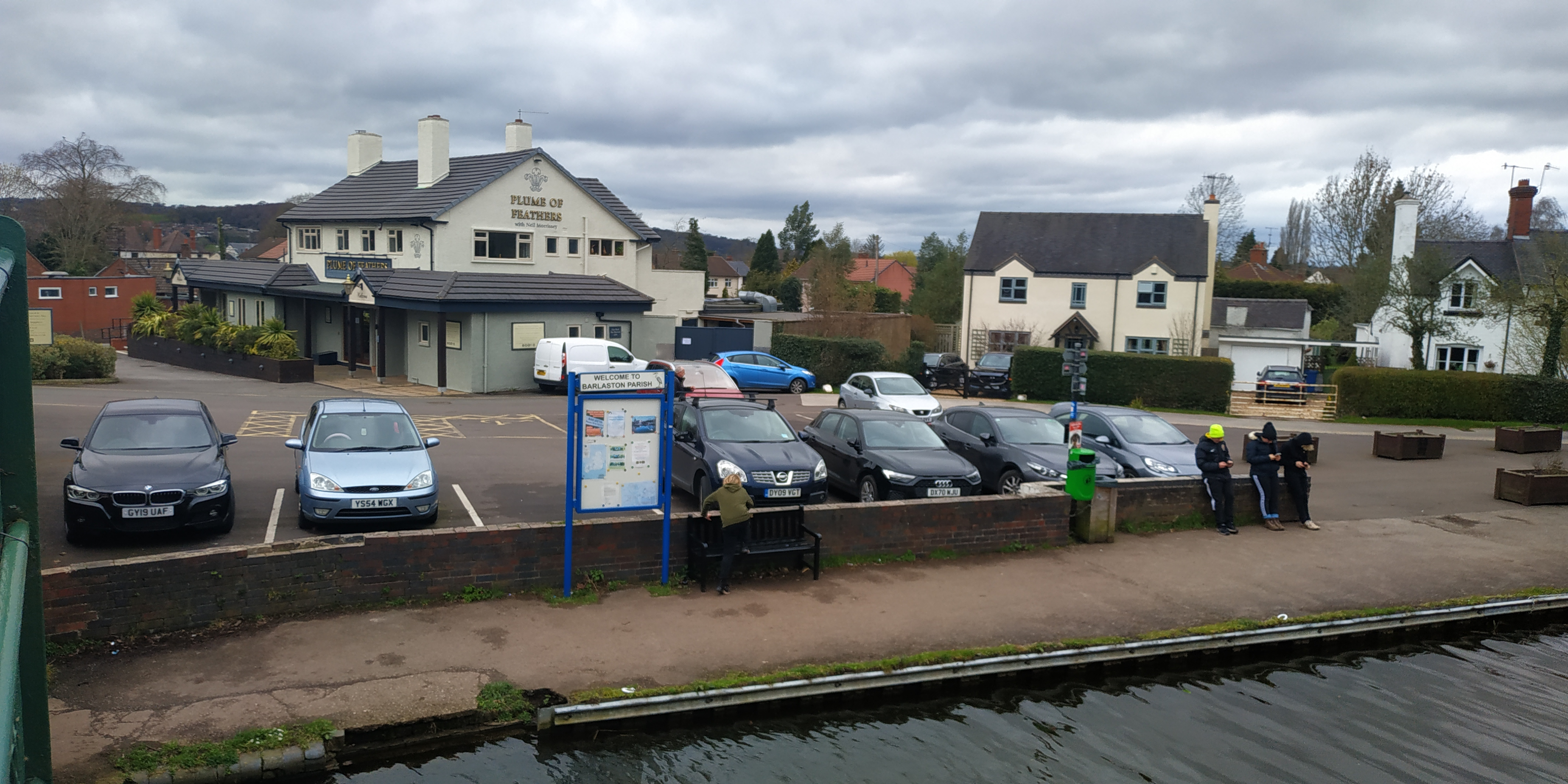
The Plume of Feathers in Barlaston

Morrissey's love of Welsh poet Dylan Thomas led him to buy up numerous properties in the village of Laugharne, including the Hurst Hotel, the New Three Mariners pub and Brown's Hotel in April 2004 for £670,000. In October 2006, it was announced that the business had put Brown's Hotel on the market to finance the redevelopment of the Hurst Hotel, and the expansion of the private members' club, Hurst House in Covent Garden, London.

In July 2008, with delays encountered on the construction of Hurst House-at-the-Mill, a luxury hotel in Hertfordshire due to open in 2009, the Laugharne-based assets of the Hurst House group went into a packaged administration. The assets were subsequently bought by new investors, resulting in the end of Morrissey's association with Laugharne.

Morrissey part-owned the lease on the Ye Olde Punch Bowl Inn in Marton, North Yorkshire. From this base came the Morrissey Fox range of real ale, developed by Morrissey and chef Richard Fox which is still in production. In June 2009, it was reported that his Welsh pub had failed and the lease to Ye Olde Punch Bowl Inn was handed back to the owner after just 18 months on 22 October 2009.

Morrissey avoided bankruptcy over his failed business ventures but entered an IVA. Morrissey went on to own a chain of pubs in Staffordshire, including The Plume of Feathers in Barlaston, and later The Old Bramshall Inn in Bramshall. The latter opened its doors as a Neil Morrissey pub on 28 June 2018, an event which Morrissey attended. In December 2021 the leasehold was sold and the pub was renamed 'The Butchers Arms'.

== Personal life ==
Morrissey married Amanda Noar in 1987 after meeting her when she was a guest in an episode of Boon; the couple have a son born in 1989. They divorced in 1991. He then became engaged to actress Elizabeth Carling, whom he had first met in 1989, when she too was working on Boon. They parted on good terms, and she later guest-starred alongside him in Men Behaving Badly. His subsequent affairs have been well documented by the British tabloids, including dating Rachel Weisz after starring together in My Summer with Des in 1998. They lived together at his apartment in Crouch End, north London. Morrissey had an affair with Amanda Holden in 2000, whom he met filming Happy Birthday, Shakespeare, leading to her divorce in 2003 from comedian Les Dennis.

Morrissey's older brother Stephen died in 1997 following a drug overdose. Morrissey has numerous tattoos. According to one version of their origin, he applied them himself with needles and Indian ink. On his left arm are his first name and a blob, which was going to be his initials before it became infected, causing him to require a tetanus jab. On his right is a squiggle, which is a reversed version of The Saint logo. Morrissey himself says the tattoos were done by other boys at the children's home. The boys there apparently saw that he did not have a tattoo and so gave him the option of a tattoo or a beating. He decided on the tattoo and now regrets not taking the other option.

In 2006, Morrissey was awarded an honorary degree from Staffordshire University. He is a supporter of Crystal Palace. A fan of real ale, in 2011 he produced a real ale with the club called Palace Ale.

== Filmography ==
=== Film ===
Year	Title	Role	Notes
1984	The Bounty	Seaman Matthew Quintal	Film debut
1987	Playing Away	Ian	
1990	I Bought a Vampire Motorcycle	Noddy, aka Nick Oddie	
1992	The Ballad of Kid Divine: The Cockney Cowboy	Cass Malone	
1994	Staggered	Jeff the Videographer	
1995	Trafford Tanzi	Dean Rebel	TV film
1996	Roger Roger	Phil	TV film
1997	The Vanishing Man	Nick Cameron	TV film
1997	The Chest	John Croft	TV film
1998	Jack and the Beanstalk	Jack	TV film
1998	Up 'n' Under	Steve	
1998	My Summer with Des	Martin	TV film
1999	Hunting Venus	Charlotte	TV film
1999	The Match	Piss Off (Mr. Doris)	
1999	The Flint Street Nativity	Adrian Atherton / Wise Man 3	TV film
1999	The Nearly Complete and Utter History of Everything	Director	TV film
1999	The Comedy Trail: A Shaggy Dog Story	Tony Smart	TV special
2000	Happy Birthday Shakespeare	Will Green	TV film
2001	Bob the Builder: A Christmas to Remember	Bob (UK)/ Lofty (UK)/ Roley (UK)/ Farmer Pickles (UK)/ Drummer (UK/US)/ Scruffty (UK/US)/ Cockerel/Rooster (UK/US)/ Baby Reindeer (UK/US)/ Some Fans (UK)	Direct-to-video animated film (voice only)
2001	Another World	Captain Ronald Brimstone	Live on stage show (voice only)
2002	Triggermen	Pete Maynard	
2002	Bob the Builder: Live!	Bob (UK)/ Lofty (UK)/ Roley (UK)	Live on stage film (voice only)
2003	Bob the Builder: The Knights of Can-A-Lot	Bob (UK)/ Lofty (UK)/ Roley (UK)/ Farmer Pickles (UK)/ Angelo Sabatini (UK)/ Falcon (UK/US)/ Guard (UK/US)	Animated TV film (voice only)
2003	Monkey Trousers	Various roles	TV film
2004	Bob the Builder: Snowed Under: The Bobblesberg Winter Games	Bob (UK)/ Lofty (UK)/ Roley (UK)/ Skier (UK/US)	Direct-to-video animated film (voice only)
2005	The Adventures of William Shakespeare	Richard III	
2006	Acorn Antiques: The Musical	John / Tony	Direct-to-video film
2006	Bob the Builder: Built to Be Wild	Bob (UK)/ Lofty (UK)/ Roley (UK)	Direct-to-video animated film (voice only)
2008	Clubbed	Simon	
2008	Bob the Builder: Race to the Finish	Bob (UK)/ Lofty (UK)/ Roley (UK)/ Angelo Sabatini (UK)/ David Dixon (UK)/ Micky Picker (UK)	Direct-to-video animated film (voice only)
2010	Inn Mates	Brian	TV film
2011	The Adventures of William Shakespeare Vol. 2	Richard III	
2012	Run for Your Wife	Gary Gardner	
2015	I Am Urban	Doc	
2015	A Gert Lush Christmas	Dave Colman	TV film
2016	As One	Douglas	Short film
2017	Diana and I	Colin Taylor	TV film
2019	Crucible of the Vampire	Robert	

=== Television ===
Year	Title	Role	Notes
1984	Juliet Bravo	Oliver	Guest appearance – 1 episode, series 5; "No Peace"
1984	Hammer House of Mystery and Suspense	Policeman	Guest appearance – 1 episode; "Paint Me a Murder"
1984	Ellis Island	Sean	Miniseries – 1 episode
1985	Roll Over Beethoven	Youth	Guest appearance – 1 episode
1985	Travellers by Night	Flick	Miniseries – 2 episodes
1986	C.A.T.S. Eyes	Trevor	Guest appearance – 1 episode; series 2
1987	Pulaski	Tarquin Taylor	Guest appearance – 1 episode: "The Price of Fame"
1987–1995	Boon	Rocky Cassidy	Recurring role – 74 episodes
1988	Gentlemen and Players	Terry	1 episode; "Stags at Bay"
1988	Crossbow	Peter	aka William Tell. 1 episode; "Masterplan"
1992	Cluedo	Gordon Ferrar	Guest appearance – 1 episode; series 3
1992–1999	Men Behaving Badly	Tony Smart	Leading role – 38 episodes
1993	Comedy Playhouse	Danny	Guest appearance – 1 episode; "Stuck on You"
1993	The Smell of Reeves and Mortimer	Ozzy Osbourne / Himself	Guest appearance – 1 episode; "Food and Drink"
1993	A Woman's Guide to Adultery	David	3 episodes
1993–1997	Noel's House Party	Sammy the Chamois (pron. "shammy") / Himself	8 episodes
1994	Paris	Rochet	6 episodes
1995	The Morph Files	Narrator	Recurring role – 25 episodes (voice only)
1996–1997	Soul Music	Mort	Recurring role – 7 episodes (voice only)
1997	Morph TV with Tony Hart	Narrator for the Morph segments	Recurring role (voice only)
1997–1998	The Enchanted World of Brambly Hedge	Wilfred Toadflax	2 episodes (voice only)
1999–2011	Bob the Builder	Bob (UK)/ Roley (UK)/ Lofty (UK)/ Farmer Pickles (UK)	Leading role – 250 regular episodes (voice only/theme song singer)
1998	The Vanishing Man	Nick Cameron	Recurring role – 6 episodes
1999	Maisy (TV series)	Narrator (UK version)	3 episodes (voice only)
1999	The Comedy Trail: A Shaggy Dog Story	Tony Smart	TV Special
2001	Look and Read	Zzaap	Guest appearance – 1 episode (voice only)
2002–2003	Paradise Heights / The Eustace Bros.	Charlie Eustace	Recurring role – 6 episodes
2003	Murder in Mind	Stephen Kite	Guest appearance – 1 episode; series 3
2004	Unsolved History	Narrator	Guest appearance – 1 episode; "Aztecs: Temple of Blood"
2004	Bob the Builder: Bob's Mini Projects	Bob (UK) / Roley (UK) / Micky Picker (UK) / Lofty (UK)	17 shorts (voice only)
2004–2005	Carrie & Barry	Barry	Recurring role – 12 episodes
2005	Bob the Builder: Bob's Big Plan	Bob (UK)/ Lofty (UK)/ Roley (UK)/ Scruffty (UK/US)	Special episode (voice only)
2005	Bob the Builder: When Bob Became a Builder	Bob (UK)/ Lofty (UK)/ Roley (UK)/ Farmer Pickles (UK)	Direct-to-video special episode (voice only)
2006	Petrolheads	Host	6 episodes
2007	Skins	Marcus Ainsworth	Guest appearance – 1 episode; series 1
2007	Neighbours	Vicar	Guest appearance – 1 episode; "Births, Deaths and Marriages"
2007	Bob the Builder: Scrambler to the Rescue	Bob (UK)/ Lofty (UK)/ Roley (UK)/ Farmer Pickles (UK)/ Angelo Sabatini (UK)	Direct-to-video special episode (voice only)
2007–2009	Waterloo Road	Eddie Lawson	Recurring role – 40 episodes
2010–2011	The Cat in the Hat Knows a Lot About That!	Aurillia / Elmore / Gary	11 episodes (voice only)
2011	Inspector George Gently	Tony Hexton	Guest appearance – 1 episode; series 4
2012	Me and Mrs. Jones	Jason	6 episodes
2012–2016	Line of Duty	DC Nigel Morton	9 episodes
2013	Skins Pure	Marcus Ainsworth	2 episodes
2014	Comedy Playhouse	Jez	Guest appearance – 1 episode; "Over to Bill"
2014	Men Behaving Badly	Tony Smart	Stand Up to Cancer & Feeling Nuts Comedy Night Special
2015	The Dumping Ground	Keith	Guest appearance – 1 episode; series 3
2015	Death in Paradise	Disco Biscuit / Duncan Roberts	Guest appearance – 1 episode; series 4
2016	Grantchester	Harding Redmond	Guest appearance – 5 episodes; series 2
2016	Bear Grylls: Mission Survive	Himself - Participant	Guest appearance – 1 episode; series 2
2016	The Night Manager	Harry Palfrey	Miniseries – 3 episodes
2017	Midsomer Murders	Mitch McAllister	1 episode; “Crime and Punishment”
2017–2018	Striking Out	Vincent Pike, QC	Recurring role – 10 episodes
2017–2022	The Good Karma Hospital	Greg McConnell	Recurring role – 24 episodes
2018	Moving On	Frank Barton	1 episode; "The Registrar"
2018	Unforgotten	Peter Carr	6 episodes
2019	The Trial of Christine Keeler	Colin Keeler	Episode 6
2020	Penance	Luke Douglas	Miniseries – all 3 episodes
2020	Finding Joy	Young Man	1 episode; "Reborn"
2021	The Syndicate	Frank Stevenson	6 episodes
2021	The Long Call	Christopher Reasley	4 episodes
2023	DNA Journey	Himself	1 episode; "Neil Morrissey and Adrian Dunbar"
2023	The Chelsea Detective	Ross Pickard	1 episode; "The Reliable Witness"
2023	Love Rat	Pete	Miniseries – 4 episodes
2024	Finders Keepers	Martin Stone	Miniseries – Main role – all 4 episodes
2025	Neil & Martin’s Bon Voyage	Himself	Travelogue miniseries with Martin Clunes

== Discography ==
=== Studio albums ===
Title	Album details	Peak chart positions				Certifications
Title	Album details	UK	AUS	IRE	NZ	Certifications
Bob the Builder: The Album (as Bob the Builder)	Release date: 3 October 2001; Label: BBC Records; Formats: CD	4	1	59	32	ARIA: 2× Platinum; BPI: Gold
Never Mind the Breeze Blocks (as Bob the Builder)	Release date: 8 December 2008; Label: Universal Music Group; Formats: CD, music download	87	—	—	—	
"—" denotes releases that did not chart

=== Singles ===
Single	Year	Peak chart positions			Certifications	Album
Single	Year	UK	AUS	IRE	Certifications	Album
"Can We Fix It?" (as Bob the Builder)	2000	1		3	ARIA: 2× Platinum; BPI: Gold	Bob the Builder: The Album
"Mambo No. 5" (as Bob the Builder)	2001	1	2	4	ARIA: Platinum; BPI: Gold	Bob the Builder: The Album
"Big Fish Little Fish" (as Bob the Builder)	2008	81	—	—		Never Mind the Breeze Blocks
"—" denotes releases that did not chart
