= Coupling (American TV series) =

U.S. TV series

- Also known as: Coupling U.S.
- Genre: Sitcom
- Based on: Coupling by Steven Moffat
- Developed by: Phoef Sutton
- Written by: Steven Moffat; Paul Corrigan; Brad Walsh; Phoef Sutton; Danny Zuker; J. J. Philbin; Liz Astrof
- Directed by: Andrew D. Weyman
- Starring: Colin Ferguson; Jay Harrington; Christopher Moynihan; Lindsay Price; Rena Sofer; Sonya Walger
- Theme music composer: Osvaldo Farrés
- Opening theme: "Perhaps, Perhaps, Perhaps"
- Composer: Ralph Schuckett
- Country of origin: United States
- Original language: English
- No. of seasons: 1
- No. of episodes: 10 (6 unaired)

Production
- Executive producers: Ben Silverman; Phoef Sutton; Beryl Vertue; Steven Moffat; Sue Vertue
- Producers: Michael E. Stokes; Liz Astrof; Paul Corrigan; Brad Walsh; Robert Peacock
- Editors: Joe Bella; Danny White
- Camera setup: Multi-camera
- Running time: 30 minutes
- Production companies: Reveille Productions; Mauretania Productions; Phoef Sutton Productions; NBC Studios; Universal Network Television

Original release
- Network: NBC
- Release: September 25 – October 23, 2003

Related
- Coupling (UK); Joking Apart

Coupling is an American sitcom television series, a remake of the British show of the same title, which aired on NBC from September 25 to October 23, 2003.

== Production ==
By 2003, three series of Coupling had been broadcast on BBC Two, all written by the show's creator, Steven Moffat. The show was loosely based on the beginnings of Moffat's real-life relationship with Sue Vertue.

NBC commissioned a remake of the show for the American market, reportedly as a replacement for Friends, which was nearing the end of its run. Moffat and original producers from Hartswood Films, Sue and Beryl Vertue, served as executive producers on the NBC adaptation, alongside Phoef Sutton and Ben Silverman.

Unlike most adaptations, the NBC adaptation would reuse Moffat's original scripts, although these were adapted by Sutton and were shortened to comply with the reduced running time (NBC has multiple advertisement breaks compared to the original broadcaster, BBC Two, which has none). Other writers, such as Danny Zuker and Paul Corrigan worked on episodes later in the series.

The original unaired pilot starred Breckin Meyer as Jeff, Melissa George as Susan and Emily Rutherfurd as Sally. NBC then fired the writers and replaced Meyer, George and Rutherfurd with Christopher Moynihan, Rena Sofer and Sonya Walger, respectively. George later commented that she "dodged a bullet" by being replaced before the show aired.

Thirteen episodes were commissioned. However, due to poor critical reception, NBC announced the show's cancellation on October 31, after only four episodes had been broadcast. The final three planned episodes were not filmed, with the remaining six episodes unbroadcast.

== Reception ==
The show received a dismal reaction from viewers and failed to perform in the ratings, being canceled before the November sweeps, with six episodes remaining unaired despite heavy publicity by the network. It was immediately panned as a poor imitation of the original UK series by viewers and critics. BBC America even ran commercials noting that they would play the original British versions on their station just after the American equivalent episodes on NBC aired, so that viewers could see instantly just how superior the original was. Miscasting and stilted delivery of a nearly identical script were believed to be the reasons for the failure, though creator Moffat blamed the show's failure on NBC's intervention during the creative and production processes. In 2007, he said: "The network fucked it up because they intervened endlessly."

The American adaptation came at a time when NBC was having success with remakes of BBC shows, such as The Weakest Link and Dog Eat Dog. NBC would find success in 2005 with a remake of another BBC series, The Office, which aired for nine seasons.

Because of what was deemed to be indecent content, two affiliates of NBC refused to air the program; KSL-TV (Channel 5) in Salt Lake City, and WNDU-TV (Channel 16) in South Bend, Indiana. Both stations were owned by religious organizations, as KSL is owned by the Bonneville International division of the LDS Church, while WNDU was at the time owned by a subsidiary of the University of Notre Dame. In those markets, WB affiliate KUWB (channel 30) and a UPN digital subchannel of CBS affiliate WSBT-TV (channel 22.2, now affiliated with Fox), respectively, aired the series after their network's primetime lineups, while nearby affiliates KENV (in Elko, Nevada, now an affiliate of Comet) and WISE-TV (in Fort Wayne, Indiana, now a CW affiliate) aired the series in accordance with the rest of the network.

Jeff Zucker, former president and CEO of NBCUniversal, later said of Coupling that it "just sucked".

== Cast ==
- Colin Ferguson as Patrick Maitland
- Jay Harrington as Steve Taylor
- Christopher Moynihan as Jeff Clancy
- Lindsay Price as Jane Honda
- Rena Sofer as Susan Freeman
- Sonya Walger as Sally Harper

== Episodes ==
No.	Title	Directed by	Written by	Original release date	Prod. code	U.S. viewers (millions)
1	"The Right One"	Andrew D. Weyman	Steven Moffat (original UK episode: "Flushed")	September 25, 2003	RP003	15.30
2	"Size Matters"	Andrew D. Weyman	Steven Moffat (original UK episode: "Size Matters")	October 2, 2003	R0401	12.93
3	"Sex, Death & Nudity"	Andrew D. Weyman	Steven Moffat (original UK episode: "Sex, Death & Nudity")	October 9, 2003	R0402	10.74
4	"Check/Mate"	Andrew D. Weyman	Danny Zuker	October 23, 2003	R0405	9.56
5	"Present Tense"	Andrew D. Weyman	Paul Corrigan & Brad Walsh	Unaired	R0403	N/A
6	"A Foreign Affair"	Andrew D. Weyman	Teleplay by : Phoef Sutton & Steven Moffat; Steven Moffat (original UK episode: "The Girl with Two Breasts")	Unaired	R0404	N/A
7	"Object Lessons"	Andrew D. Weyman	Liz Astrof	Unaired	R0406	N/A
8	"Holiday"	Andrew D. Weyman	Paul Corrigan & Brad Walsh	Unaired	R0407	N/A
9	"Dressed"	Andrew D. Weyman	Teleplay by : Phoef Sutton & Steven Moffat; Steven Moffat (original UK episode: "Dressed")	Unaired	R0408	N/A
10	"Nipple Effect"	Andrew D. Weyman	J.J. Philbin	Unaired	R0409	N/A

== Bibliography ==
- Griffin, Jeffrey (2008). "Coupling Crosses the Atlantic: A Case Study in the Format Adaptation of a Fictional Series". Warsaw Journal for the Study of the United States. 24.
