= The Guilty (TV series) =

- DVD cover
- Genre: Crime drama
- Written by: Debbie O'Malley
- Directed by: Edward Bazalgette
- Starring: Tamsin Greig; Arsher Ali; Darren Boyd; Katherine Kelly; Pooky Quesnel
- Composer: Paul Englishby
- Country of origin: United Kingdom
- Original language: English
- No. of series: 1
- No. of episodes: 3

Production
- Executive producers: Beryl Vertue; Sue Vertue
- Producer: Elaine Cameron
- Cinematography: Gavin Finney
- Running time: 60 minutes
- Production company: Hartswood Films

Original release
- Network: ITV
- Release: 5 September – 19 September 2013

The Guilty is a three-part television drama, broadcast on ITV from 5 to 19 September 2013. The drama stars Tamsin Greig, Darren Boyd and Katherine Kelly, and involves the police investigation into the disappearance of young boy, Callum Reid. In 2008, DCI Maggie Brand (Greig) is tasked with finding the missing boy, while dealing with her own personal problems – but he remains missing. Five years on, Callum's body is recovered and Maggie is determined to discover what happened. The series was subsequently released on DVD in the Netherlands in 2014, but as of 2016, remains unreleased in the UK.

== Critical reception ==
Mark Lawson of The Guardian said of the opening episode: "The Guilty impressively manages to leave some new fingerprints on a much-handled form."

== Cast ==
- Tamsin Greig as DCI Maggie Brand
- Arsher Ali as DS Vinesh Roy
- Tom Beard as DSI Alan Reece
- Darren Boyd as Daniel Reid
- Ruta Gedmintas as Teresa Morgan
- Katherine Kelly as Claire Reid
- Linda Marlowe as Lynn Brand
- Jade Ogugua as DC Lenny Jackson
- David Pusey as DC Max Cauldwell
- Pooky Quesnel as Ruth Hide
- Jay Simpson as DS Ron Singer
- Alan Williams as Frank Lawson
- Nicola Thorp as Miss Brenner
- Daniel Runacres-Grundstrom as Callum Reid
- Tommy Potten as Sam Colman
- Jude Foley as Older Luke Reid
- Teddy Fitzpatrick as Young Luke Reid

== Episodes ==
No.	Title	Directed by	Written by	Original release date	UK viewers (millions)
1	"Episode 1"	Edward Bazalgette	Debbie O'Malley	5 September 2013	4.07
A four year old boy goes missing from a family barbecue believed to have been abducted. Five years later, workmen dig up his remains only a short distance from his home.
2	"Episode 2"	Edward Bazalgette	Debbie O'Malley	12 September 2013	3.30
The Reid family and their neighbours are re-interviewed following the discovery of Callum's body. Maggie Brand travels to Germany and has to deal with issues at home as well as the case.
3	"Episode 3"	Edward Bazalgette	Debbie O'Malley	19 September 2013	3.58
Maggie faces pressure to charge her prime suspect despite her belief that it's not the right person. At home, she faces the tough realization her son is not like the other children in his school. A final death leaves Maggie with the decision to reveal the truth or protect her career.

== Worldwide release ==
Country	Network	Premiere date
Germany	VOX	5 April 2014
