= Jekyll (TV series) =

British television series

- The Jekyll intertitle that appeared on episodes 1–5. The name "Hyde" was used for the sixth episode.
- Written by: Steven Moffat
- Directed by: Douglas Mackinnon; Matt Lipsey
- Starring: James Nesbitt; Gina Bellman; Paterson Joseph; Denis Lawson; Michelle Ryan; Meera Syal; Fenella Woolgar
- Theme music composer: Debbie Wiseman
- Country of origin: United Kingdom
- Original language: English
- No. of series: 1
- No. of episodes: 6

Production
- Executive producers: Steven Moffat; Beryl Vertue; Kathryn Mitchell
- Producers: Elaine Cameron; Jeffrey Taylor
- Cinematography: Adam Suschitzky; Peter Greenhalgh
- Editors: Andrew McClelland; Fiona Colbeck
- Camera setup: Single-camera
- Running time: 55 minutes
- Production companies: Hartswood Films; Stagescreen Productions; BBC America

Original release
- Network: BBC One
- Release: 16 June – 28 July 2007

Jekyll is a six-part British television drama serial produced by Hartswood Films and Stagescreen Productions for BBC One. The series also received funding from BBC America. Steven Moffat wrote all six episodes, with Douglas Mackinnon and Matt Lipsey each directing three episodes.

The series is described by its creators as a sequel to the 1886 novella Strange Case of Dr Jekyll and Mr Hyde, rather than an adaptation of it, with the Robert Louis Stevenson tale serving as a backstory within the series. It stars James Nesbitt as Tom Jackman, a modern-day descendant of Dr Jekyll, who has recently begun transforming into a version of Mr Hyde. Jackman is aided by psychiatric nurse Katherine Reimer, played by Michelle Ryan. Gina Bellman also appears as Claire, Tom's wife.

Filming took place at various locations around southern England in late 2006. The series was first transmitted on BBC One in June and July 2007, receiving mainly positive reviews.

== Plot ==
Doctor Tom Jackman, a married father of two, has abandoned his family without explanation to live in a heavily fortified basement flat. He hires psychiatric nurse Katherine Reimer to help him with his unusual case. After explaining a set of elaborate security procedures to Reimer, he straps himself into a secured metal chair and undergoes a psychological transformation.

Reimer observes that Jackman's alter ego exhibits rage, heightened senses, greatly superior strength and speed, and a more playful and flirtatious manner. She assures this persona she will keep his secrets just as she keeps Jackman's, but asks for guarantees he will not harm her. After being informed of the novella Strange Case of Dr Jekyll and Mr Hyde, Jackman's alter ego takes Hyde's name for his own and the two agree to form an uneasy truce. While they share a body, neither remembers what the other did while dominant. They use a micro cassette recorder to leave messages for each other.

Jackman began transforming into the violent, lecherous Hyde recently. Fearing for his family's safety, he chose to isolate himself from them, but he cannot bring himself to cut off all contact, and visits his wife Claire. During one such visit, Hyde assumes control and learns about Jackman's family.

Miranda Callendar, a detective employed by Claire, learns about Hyde and informs Jackman that Jekyll and Hyde was not fiction, but a fictionalised version of actual events. Callendar shows Jackman a picture of the real Doctor Jekyll who lived in Edinburgh, Scotland in the 19th century. Jackman is startled to see that Jekyll looks exactly like him, and that he died at around Jackman's current age; and Callendar speculates that he is a descendant of the original Doctor Jekyll, except for the fact that Doctor Jekyll had died without children.

Jackman is also being stalked by a private security team led by an American named Benjamin. Unbeknownst to him, the team works for his former employers at the biotechnology firm, Klein and Utterson, and is directed by his friend Peter Syme.

When Benjamin's team puts Jackman's children at risk, Hyde asserts himself, killing a lion, then taunts Benjamin by throwing the lion's corpse onto the roof of the surveillance van the team is using. At the hospital he is approached by Sophia, an elderly woman who claims to be his mother, but before he can question her she disappears.

Jackman confronts Peter Syme, who attempts to drug him. This provokes Hyde to appear and take Syme and Claire hostage. Claire argues that they need to find a cure for Jackman's condition. Hyde kills Benjamin and Syme insists that Klein and Utterson have had a cure for a long time. Jackman is captured and locked inside a metal coffin.

Reimer and Callendar confront Syme, claiming they know the truth about Jackman. Callendar theorises that Klein and Utterson have access to cloning technology and that Jackman is Jekyll's clone. Syme denies this and orders them taken away to be killed.

Syme reveals to Claire that the treatment Jackman is undergoing will stabilise into one persona: If it is Hyde, he will be kept for research in order to synthesise the potion that turned the original Jekyll into Hyde; If it is Jackman, she is free to take him home. When the box is opened, Hyde is dominant.

In a flashback triggered by genetic memory, Hyde has a vision of a meeting between Jekyll and Robert Louis Stevenson, the author of Strange Case of Dr Jekyll and Mr Hyde. Stevenson agrees to write a fictional version of Jekyll's case but reveals that he knows the truth: there is no potion. Instead, Jekyll was transformed into Hyde by his love for Alice, a maid within his household. Flashbacks into Jackman's own life show his Hyde first manifesting fully during a seaside holiday with Claire, after the pair were accosted by hooligans.

Enraged by further threats to Jackman's family, Hyde escapes from Klein and Utterson. Ms Utterson, a ruthless redheaded American woman at the head of Klein and Utterson, takes Claire and her sons hostage at a private estate, locking the twins in miniature versions of the same coffin used on their father.

Jackman's alleged mother, Sophia, appears on the premises and helps Claire escape her locked bedroom. She tells Claire how Klein and Utterson had indeed tried to clone Doctor Jekyll but had been unsuccessful. Claire meets several of the failed attempts in the lowest basement of the building. They are disfigured and in a near-vegetative state. Sophia explains that Jackman is a descendant of Doctor Jekyll (who died a virgin), through Mr Hyde, and by chance a perfect natural genetic duplicate, "a perfect throwback, a chance in a million". Klein and Utterson had discovered this and had him under surveillance for almost his entire life, from when he was six-months-old. In order to trigger his transformation into Hyde, they created a clone of Alice, the maid whom Jekyll had loved. This clone is Claire herself.

Hyde tries to rescue Jackman's family from Klein and Utterson, killing Syme and many other personnel. In the end there is a stand-off, with Jackman and Claire's sons held hostage and suffocating. The Hyde personality is apparently killed when he is shot with multiple bullets and then manages to avoid 'sharing the damage' by taking the wounds onto himself while allowing Jackman to assume his undamaged, healthy form, leaving Doctor Jackman as the only personality.

Six months later, Jackman has tracked down Sophia, the woman who claimed to be his mother. When he questions her about his father, she reveals that she is the descendant of Hyde, the one through whom he had inherited the family curse from, and that it's "never over". As Jackman watches horrified, the powerless, tired, grey-haired Sophia transforms into her own version of the Hyde persona, the feral, red-headed Ms Utterson.

== Cast ==
- James Nesbitt as Dr Tom Jackman/Hyde/Dr Jekyll
- Gina Bellman as Claire Jackman
- Paterson Joseph as Benjamin Maddox
- Denis Lawson as Peter Syme
- Michelle Ryan as Katherine Reimer
- Meera Syal as Miranda Callender
- Fenella Woolgar as Min
- Linda Marlowe as Ms Utterson
- Andrew Byrne as Eddie Jackman
- Christopher Day as Harry Jackman
- Al Hunter Ashton as Christopher

== Episodes ==
No.	Title	Directed by	Written by	Original release date	Prod. code	UK viewers (millions)
1	"Episode One"	Douglas Mackinnon	Steven Moffat	16 June 2007	ICDA641D	5.1
Tom Jackman is plagued by strange transformations into a stronger, more animal-like version of himself. To ease the situation he hires an assistant in Katherine Reimer to see to the needs of both himself and his alter ego. He later finds that his estranged wife Claire has employed a detective, Miranda Calender, to find out why he left her. Calender is able to reveal to Jackman that he is apparently the last living descendant of Henry Jekyll, and that they look exactly alike, despite the fact that Jekyll never had children. She is unable to reveal who the other party observing him is. Meanwhile, Hyde continues to grow stronger as this third party introduces itself through Benjamin.
2	"Episode Two"	Douglas Mackinnon	Steven Moffat	23 June 2007	ICDA642X	3.9
While at a zoo, Benjamin's team tries to force out Hyde by placing Tom's son, Eddie, in the lion's den. Benjamin, who says he has controlled Tom for forty years waiting for Hyde to emerge, asks Hyde to work with him. Hyde refuses, driving away with Benjamin’s henchman, Christopher, whose battered body Hyde later dumps. Tom awakes to be confronted by Sophia, an elderly woman with whom Katherine has been working. Sophia confesses that she left Tom in a railway station 40 years ago with only a letter and a photo. She reveals that he is a direct descendant of Dr Henry Jekyll. Peter, who has been working for Benjamin, has tipped him off about Tom's whereabouts. When Benjamin's team arrive at the hospital, Sophia urges Tom to disappear permanently.
3	"Episode Three"	Douglas Mackinnon	Steven Moffat	30 June 2007	ICDA643R	3.8
Tom discovers that the organisation tracking him is 'Klein & Utterson', the very company he works for. He confronts Peter at his house. However, Peter had drugged him. Fearing that Hyde will attack his family when he's unconscious, Tom locks Peter in the basement with Hyde and forces him to swallow the key. Claire appears to witness her husband’s transformation in Hyde. Twelve hours later, Tom awakens with a key. Hyde kills Benjamin — one of the organisation's leaders. Posing as police, Benjamin's team place Tom in a very confined box and transfer him to another location.
4	"Episode Four"	Matt Lipsey	Steven Moffat	14 July 2007	ICDA644K	2.8
When a private detective confronts Klein & Utterson with the theory that Tom is Jekyll's clone, Peter reveals that they don't know how Tom came to be. Flashback sequences reveal how Tom and Claire first met as well as Hyde's first 'awakenings'. The flashback recounts how the couple were surprised that Claire gave birth to twins as there had only been one heartbeat. In the present, Claire demands to know where her children are, why her husband is locked in a box, and the nature of her husband's relationship with Katherine.
5	"Episode Five"	Matt Lipsey	Steven Moffat	21 July 2007	ICDA645E	3.5
At the home of Dr Henry Jekyll, in 1886, Robert Louis Stevenson presents a manuscript. The story lacks only an ending. Jekyll is dying because he can no longer control the changes and his last secret will die with him as he destroys a vital piece of paper in the fire. Back in the present, Tom is believed dead, with Hyde having taken over after Tom succumbed to terror due to his claustrophobia. Dipping into Tom's memories, Hyde taps into genetic memory from Henry Jekyll, and learns that Jekyll never used a potion (something that was widely believed, and evidently something that Klein & Utterson were aiming to reproduce). He also discovers that Jekyll's maid, Alice, looked identical to his wife, shortly before Klein & Utterson abduct his wife and children.
6	"Episode Six"	Matt Lipsey	Steven Moffat	28 July 2007	ICDA646Y	3.2
Tom and Hyde fully combine their personalities, with Tom needing Hyde's physical strength while Hyde requires Tom's emotional maturity. Claire is revealed to be a clone of Jekyll's maid Alice - created in order to stimulate the transformation in Tom that her 'template' triggered in Jekyll, while Tom is a descendant of Hyde's illegitimate offspring. Hyde dies protecting Tom's children, refusing to 'share the damage' with his other self after he is shot. It is finally revealed that Ms Utterson, the American head of Klein & Utterson, is the Hyde persona of Tom's mother Sophia, from whom he inherited the Hyde genes.

== Production ==
=== Development ===
Jeffrey Tayor of Stagescreen Productions had the idea of a modern version of Strange Case of Dr Jekyll and Mr Hyde in the mid-1990s. He attempted to get it produced in the United States three times, but all three attempts fell through for various reasons. He returned to England from the west coast of the United States and joined with Hartswood Films when Elaine Cameron was scouting for ideas for a supernatural thriller. Cameron then approached Steven Moffat for a script, and a six-part series was commissioned by the BBC's Jane Tranter and John Yorke in November 2005. BBC America signed on to provide co-production funding in March 2006. The producers regularly met with Moffat for brainstorming sessions. Cameron's assistant took notes from these conversations, after which they would look over the notes and start the process again. The producers invited Moffat to "write anything", with the intention of cutting the material back later. However, they were reluctant to cut material once they saw it on the page. The first episode starts with Jackman already knowing about his alter ego. Because the plot of Jekyll begins after the story has developed for the characters, Nesbitt says that the show feels like it is a second series.

Moffat explicitly describes the series as a sequel, rather than an adaptation, stating the Jekyll of the original story really existed, and Jackman is his "modern-day descendant dealing with the same problems". As Jekyll and Hyde is such a well-known phrase, Moffat labored over what to call the series, eventually deciding upon Jekyll because that word "carries the name Hyde". The final episode replaces the title "Jekyll" with "Hyde". Producer Elaine Cameron says the one word title gives the series a "very modern feel". Moffat initially named the character Jekyll rather than Jackman, but found it cumbersome to constantly explain that the book had not been written in this alternate universe. Instead he chose a version where the book exists, but changed the name to Jackman. Otherwise, Cameron felt, the character would appear stupid by not realising what was happening when turning into Hyde.

The scene between Tom and Katherine was expanded slightly in the sixth episode to keep their relationship active to facilitate a second series. Other plot threads that were left dangling with the intention to be explored in a second series include the reveals that Ms. Utterson is the Hyde side to Jackman's mother Sophia, and that Jackman's twin sons Eddie and Harry can swap bodies. However, no further episodes were commissioned. In an August 2007 interview, Moffat told Alan Sepinwall of The Star-Ledger that he had a sequel written for the miniseries "should the BBC be interested". Following Jekyll, Moffat became a co-writer on Sherlock.

=== Casting ===
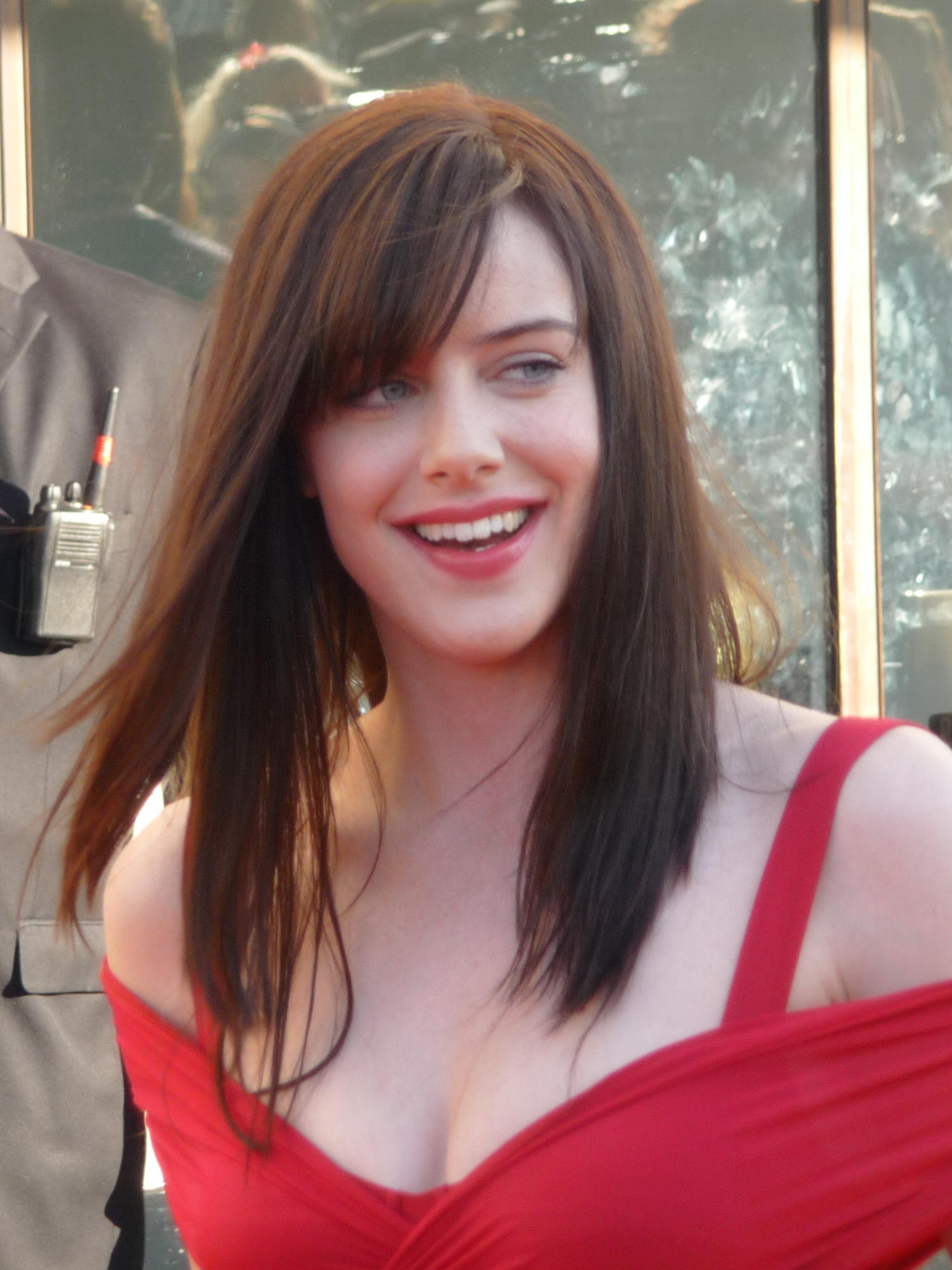
Michelle Ryan consulted the Royal College of Psychiatry in preparation for her role.

James Nesbitt and his agent attended a meeting with Jane Tranter in late 2005 regarding the 2006 series of Murphy's Law. At the conclusion of the meeting, she offered him a script for Jekyll, suggesting that he might like the role. Nesbitt took the script role as a way of putting a distance between his previous work. The casting of Nesbitt as Tom Jackman and Hyde was publicised on 12 December 2005, but filming was not scheduled to begin until September 2006, increasing Nesbitt's anticipation to play the roles. Writer Steven Moffat said that the dual-role required a very skilled actor, and a well-known actor was necessary because it was such an expensive show to produce. The production team decided Nesbitt's two characters would be mainly differentiated over a change in performance rather than by extensive make-up because they wanted Hyde to be able to walk around in public without attracting attention.

Michelle Ryan believed herself to be too young for the part, though that aspect had already been written into the character. To prepare, she consulted the Royal College of Psychiatry. Ryan dyed her hair red for the role to help differentiate her from Tom Jackman's wife. Denis Lawson was cast as Peter Syme. The actor consulted his post-graduate son for information on Syme's job.

Moffat initially doubted Gina Bellman's suitability for the role of Claire Jackman because he associated her too much with Jane Christie, the character she had played in his sitcom Coupling. Moffat did not imagine the character to be as beautiful as Bellman, but her audition was so good that he revised his vision of the character. Bellman originally auditioned for the role of Katherine, but the producers wanted someone younger to play that role. However, Bellman said that she talked herself out of the role by arguing that there should be an age gap between Katherine and Claire to avoid Katherine becoming a threat to the wife. Bellman approached her role as if Claire had become caught up in Tom's mid-life crisis, an angle that impressed the producers.

Meera Syal was attracted to her role because Miranda was not a clichéd private detective and she thought the humour was "fresh". During the second filming block, Mark Gatiss briefly joined the cast, playing the small but important role of Robert Louis Stevenson in flashback scenes in episode five.

Other roles included Paterson Joseph as Benjamin Maddox, and Linda Marlowe as Ms Utterson.

=== Production ===
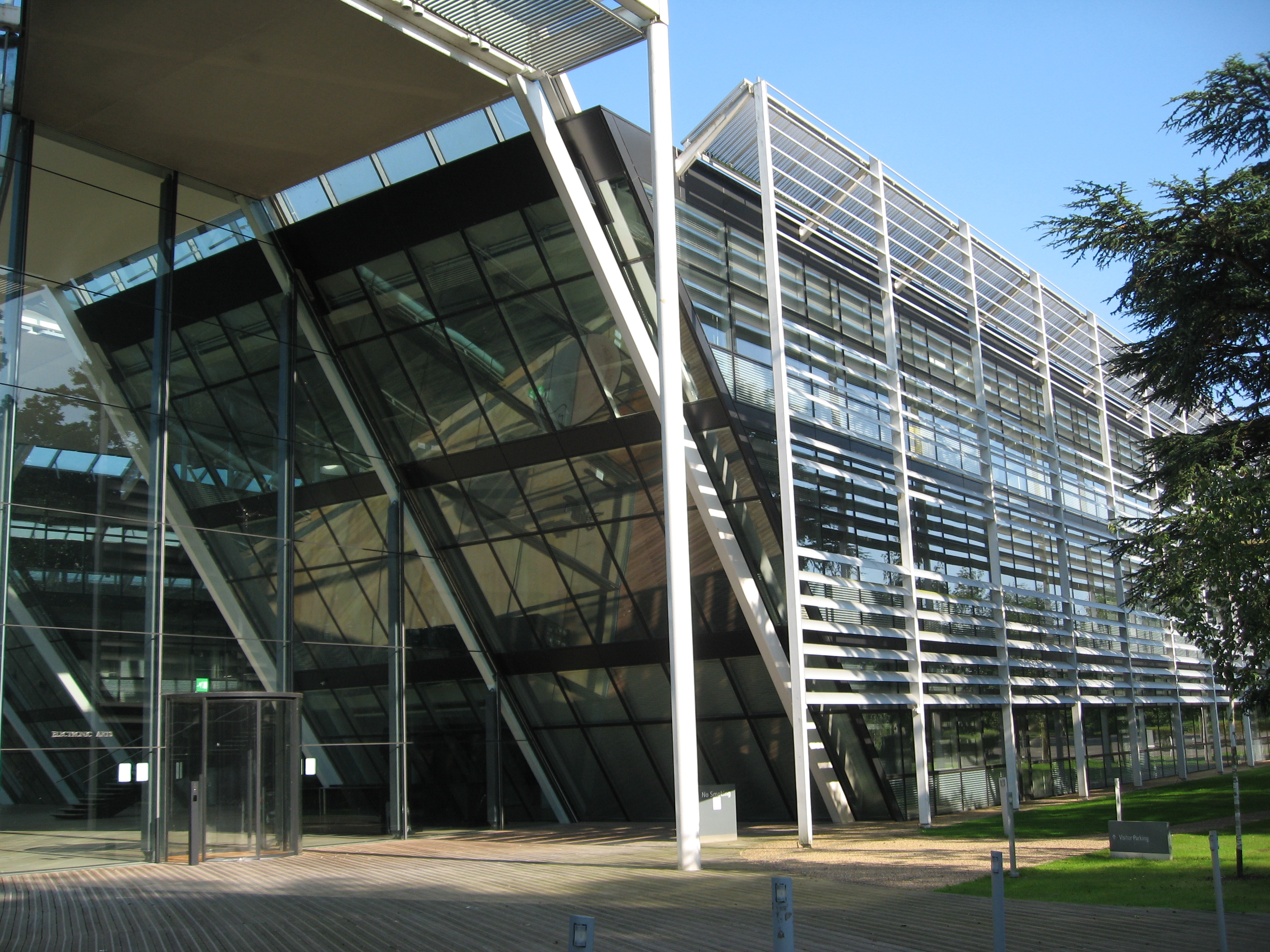
The European Headquarters for Electronic Arts in Chertsey, Surrey was used as The Klein & Utterson Institute

The series was filmed in two blocks of three episodes. The first three were directed by Douglas Mackinnon and the second three episodes by Matt Lipsey. It took an hour of make-up each day to turn Nesbitt into Hyde; a hairpiece lowered his hairline and prosthetics were added to his chin, nose and ear lobes. He also wore black contact lenses to make Hyde "soulless". After many debates, the producers decided that Hyde's imminent arrival would be indicated by the flash of a black eye. The eye imagery evolved during filming, and did not appear in the script.

Filming began in September 2006 with the zoo sequence from the second episode, in which Benjamin's team have set Tom up to force out Hyde by placing his son, Eddie, in the lion's den. Writing the sequence at a late stage in the production, Moffat wanted to compare Hyde's natural instinct to kill to that of a lion. This was shot on location at Heythrop Zoo, a private zoo in Chipping Norton run by Jim Clubb, whose firm Amazing Animals specialises in training animals for cinema and television. The Norman Foster-designed building in Chertsey, Surrey, which then housed the European Headquarters of video game designer and publisher Electronic Arts, was used as The Klein & Utterson Institute. A large country estate near Henley-on-Thames and in Bognor Regis was used for some of the scenes whilst on the run and in flashbacks. A disused Boys' school in Gloucestershire, and the Hammer House in Wardour Street, Soho were used in episode six. Filming concluded on 20 December 2006.

The schedule was tight for a complex production. The production team had twelve days to shoot each episode, which director Douglas Mackinnon says was the biggest challenge of the project. The required amount of material was shot for most of the episodes. However, an extra twenty minutes of material was filmed for episode six. Director Matt Lipsey recalls that the team struggled to cut the extra material whilst maintaining the integrity of the episode. Lipsey credits Moffat for not "being precious" over his material during the editing process, and points out that his willingness to cut superfluous material means that he is taken seriously when he argues for something to be retained.

The music was composed by Debbie Wiseman. The orchestra featured approximately 18 pieces. Some cues featured the vocals of Hayley Westenra to foreshadow the importance of a female voice.

== Broadcast and reception ==
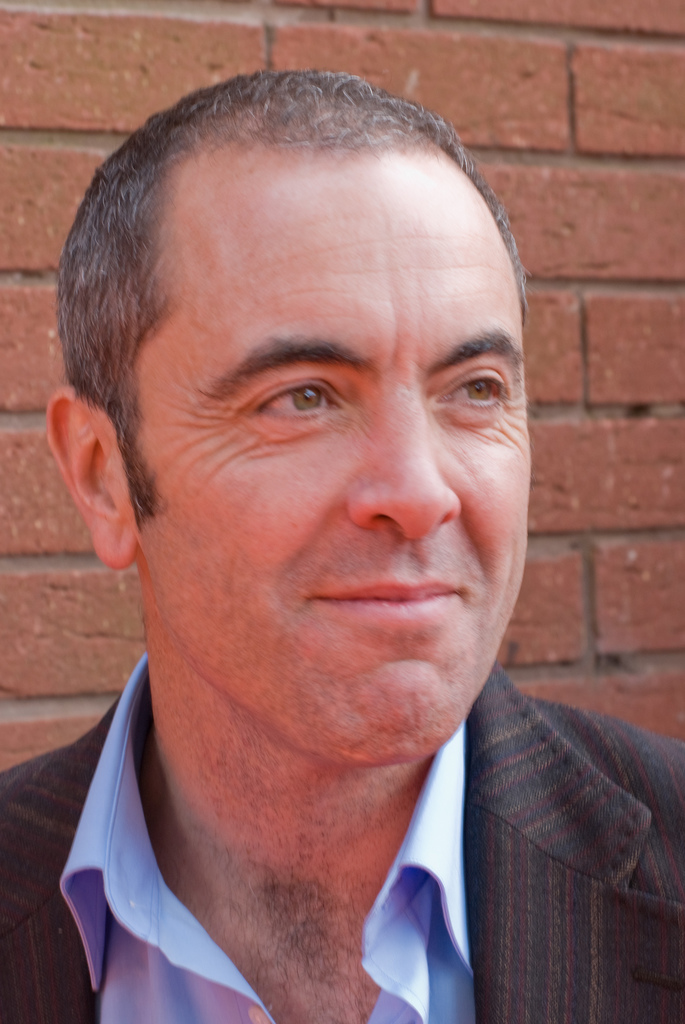
James Nesbitt earned a Golden Globe Award nomination for his role.

Jekyll was broadcast on BBC One on Saturday nights from 9 p.m. A two-week break occurred between showings of the third and fourth episodes because the Live Earth benefit concert was broadcast during its timeslot on 7 July. The series began airing on BBC America from 4 August, as part of a "Supernatural Saturday" programming strand. In Australia, Jekyll began broadcasting on ABC1, Sundays at 8.30 p.m. from 2 March 2008 with a double episode back-to-back each week. In Canada, Jekyll began broadcasting on Showcase, beginning at the end of August 2007 and on BBC Canada, Wednesdays at 10:00 p.m. from 26 March 2008. Also in Hong Kong, Wednesday at 11:55 p.m. from 11 February 2009 on TVB Pearl. In the Netherlands, Jekyll was broadcast in the summer of 2009 on Sci-Fi Channel.

Certain edits were made to the United Kingdom broadcasts in order to remove language unsuitable for Saturday night BBC One audiences. For example, a line spoken by Hyde in episode one was changed from "Who the fuck is Mr Hyde?" to "Who the hell is Mr Hyde?"

James Jackson of The Times rated the first episode four out of five stars, calling Nesbitt's performance as Hyde "as entertainingly [over the top] as a dozen Doctor Who villains, with a palpable sense of menace to boot". The conspiracy plot is praised as a storyline that distinguishes this series from other adaptations. The Daily Telegraph's Stephen Pile criticised the script for "veering between Hammer horror and larky humour" and for being "cheesy". He also criticised Hyde's gravity-defying hijinks and mistook Michelle Ryan for a model. In the same newspaper, James Walton called the first episode a combination of "a good yarn with several nicely thoughtful touches". David Cornelius of DVDTalk was full of compliments for the series, summing up its review with the statement "six episodes, 300 minutes, not a single one of them wasted. 'Jekyll' is this year's finest television event". The Australian Broadcasting Corporation, commenting on the series being part of their 2008 line-up, said "This classic horror tale has been given a modern make-over that will leave you on the edge of your seat and begging for more. James Nesbitt is outstanding as the new Dr Jekyll and Mr Hyde". Nesbitt was nominated for the Golden Globe Award for Best Performance by an Actor in a Mini-Series or Motion Picture Made for Television for his roles. Paterson Joseph received a mention in the nominations for the 2008 Screen Nation awards.

== Home release ==
The BBFC rated all episodes as a 15 certificate on 11 June 2007. Jekyll: Season One was released for region 2 on 30 July 2007 by Contender Home Entertainment. It includes uncut episodes, including restoration of some swearing cut from the BBC broadcasts. As DVD Verdict says about this uncut version, "the language is saucier, the violence a bit more bloody, and the sex more primal." The disc contains audio commentaries on two episodes: producer Elaine Cameron, writer Steven Moffat and first-block director Douglas Mackinnon comment on episode one, while executive producer Beryl Vertue, second-block director Matt Lipsey and actress Gina Bellman comment upon the sixth episode. The set also contains two documentaries: "Anatomy of a Scene" focuses upon the production of the zoo sequence in episode two, while "The Tale Retold" covers the evolution of the series. The first Region 1 release occurred in the United States on 18 September 2007, although the Region 1 Canadian release was delayed until 9 October, following the Canadian broadcast of the series on Showcase, which commenced at the end of August 2007.

== American remake ==
In May 2016, Variety reported that Lionsgate will develop an adaptation of the BBC miniseries with Ellen DeGeneres and Jeff Kleeman producing through their A Very Good Production banner and scribe team Anthony Bagarozzi & Charles Mondry writing. In July 2016, it was announced that Chris Evans would play the leading role in the American remake. In December 2016, it was announced that Ruben Fleischer will direct the film. However, no other information has been reported about this film adaptation since then.

== See also ==
- Jekyll and Hyde - 2015 TV series
