= List of Coupling episodes =

Coupling is a BBC Television sitcom. Written by Steven Moffat, it is based on his relationship with Sue Vertue, the show's producer. Martin Dennis directed all 28 episodes for Hartswood Films. The first episode was transmitted on 12 May 2000, and the final transmitted on 14 June 2004. The first three series were first broadcast on BBC Two, whereas the final series was broadcast on BBC Three.

The show centres on the dating and sexual adventures and mishaps of six friends in their thirties, often depicting the three women and the three men each talking amongst themselves about the same events, but in entirely different terms.

== Series overview ==
Series	Episodes	Originally released		
Series	Episodes	First released	Last released	Network
1	6	12 May 2000	16 June 2000	BBC Two
2	9	3 September 2001	29 October 2001	BBC Two
3	7	23 September 2002	4 November 2002	BBC Two
4	6	10 May 2004	14 June 2004	BBC Three

== Episodes ==
=== Series 1 (2000) ===
No. overall	No. in series	Title	Directed by	Written by	Original release date	Prod. code
1	1	"Flushed"	Martin Dennis	Steven Moffat	12 May 2000	IPEA231F
Jane thwarts Steve's serial attempts to break up with her by having sex with him each time, this time in a cubicle in the women's toilet of the bar which the group frequent. Susan and Patrick are also breaking up. Susan and Steve meet in the women's toilets when Steve leaves the cubicle to buy a condom from the machine, and Steve asks her out. Steve intends to break up with Jane once and for all just before his dinner date with Susan. Jeff is there for reasons nobody is sure of. Susan arrives early because she was going to have a facial, performed by her beautician friend Sally, who cancelled it in order to have dinner with Patrick at the same restaurant. The group have dinner together.
2	2	"Size Matters"	Martin Dennis	Steven Moffat	19 May 2000	IPEA232A
After an out of control pause during a phone call, Susan invites Steve to dinner, offering to cook. While discussing foreplay, Jeff warns Steve of the perils of falling into the 'sock gap' and also to examine Susan’s remote controls. Sally tries to overcome her aversion to Patrick’s support of the Conservatives when Susan tells her about his particularly large penis, and Jeff freaks out when Sally, Steve and Jane task him with verifying this unusual attribute.
3	3	"Sex, Death and Nudity"	Martin Dennis	Steven Moffat	26 May 2000	IPEA233T
Whilst giving Jeff advice on preparing for a job interview, Patrick recommends imagining the panel naked, which Jeff begins to practice. Jeff introduces Patrick and Steve to the 'giggle loop', his name for difficulty of containing laughter at inappropriate times. Steve is persuaded to attend Jane’s aunt's funeral ... as Jane's boyfriend, as she has not told her family they have split up. Susan will not let Steve go alone, and Steve asks Jeff to pretend to be Susan’s boyfriend, beginning a chain of invitations that sees all six at the funeral, where the giggle loop strikes the least likely member of the group.
4	4	"Inferno"	Martin Dennis	Steven Moffat	2 June 2000	IPEA234N
Whilst Patrick sports a new haircut, Susan discovers a porn film, Lesbian Spank Inferno, in Steve’s VCR. To avoid a confrontation, Steve tells Susan he loves her, which drives Jane to see her psychologist Jill, who is not interested in having her as her patient. Susan and Steve host a dinner party for Sally, Patrick, Jeff, Jane and a reluctant Jill. Before dinner, Jeff and Patrick let slip that they know about the Inferno tape and Sally gives away that Susan has told the girls too, making dinner a very uncomfortable occasion for all. Patrick believes Jill and Jane are a couple and tries to convert her; on the other hand, Jill thinks Patrick is gay (due to his new haircut) and tries to convert him, ending with the two in bed together. Finally, the tape comes into the conversation and Steve ends up giving a impassioned speech, inadvertently admitting that he sees himself spending his life with Susan.
5	5	"The Girl with Two Breasts"	Martin Dennis	Steven Moffat	9 June 2000	IPEA235H
Jeff sees a beautiful young woman alone in a pub. The attraction is mutual, but she is Israeli, only speaks Hebrew and cannot communicate without the help of her interpreter. They chat and end up creating a huge confusion, with the viewer shown the conversation from both sides to illustrate just how the miscommunication occurs. The girls are just jealous of the attractive Israeli. Steve and Patrick think of names for a porn film.
6	6	"The Cupboard of Patrick's Love"	Martin Dennis	Steven Moffat	16 June 2000	IPEA236B
Jane visits Patrick at home to discuss the ‘walls’ between them and discovers a cupboard filled with video tapes Patrick made of his encounters with previous lovers. When Steve and Susan independently learn about the cupboard, both realize that, as Patrick’s ex, Susan will be in there too. Susan catches the guys and Sally watching the tape, and is offended to learn that: they went behind her back on this matter; Patrick taped over her; and none of the viewers noticed this. She breaks up with Steve, but takes him back before the end of the episode.

=== Series 2 (2001) ===
No. overall	No. in series	Title	Directed by	Written by	Original release date	Prod. code
7	1	"The Man with Two Legs"	Martin Dennis	Steven Moffat	3 September 2001	IPEA352J
Jeff falls in love with a woman who commutes on the train with him (Alison King), of whom he has only seen her leg. In making conversation with her, he claims that he has a wooden leg; she reveals that her brother is also an amputee, and introduces Jeff to him and his disability support group. Sally repeatedly brags about her 'perfect' new boyfriend, but he soon turns out not to be everything Sally’s made him out to be.
8	2	"My Dinner in Hell"	Martin Dennis	Steven Moffat	10 September 2001	IPEA351P
At the pub, the guys discuss celebrities whom they are infatuated with. Steve's is news presenter Mariella Frostrup, whom he then runs into on the way to the toilet. As he leaves for a dinner with Susan and her parents, he accidentally drops his phone. Jane has been telling the girls about how she meets celebrities by slipping her phone into their pockets. Believing the dropped phone to be Sally's, Jane puts it Frostrup's pocket with the intention of reclaiming the "lost" phone. This causes confusion when Susan calls the number during the dinner. A misunderstanding over the term 'whistling alone,' which Steve assumes to be a euphemism for masturbation, causes him to order Susan's parents out of the flat. Meanwhile, Jeff and Patrick learn that one of Patrick's former lovers made a cast of his penis, which is now a best-selling dildo called the "Junior Patrick." Steve is enlisted to buy one, which he accidentally gifts to Susan's parents. They love the gift.
9	3	"Her Best Friend's Bottom"	Martin Dennis	Steven Moffat	17 September 2001	IPEA355R
Steve sees Sally naked by mistake after she uses Susan's shower. Patrick has "car trouble," while Steve and Sally are trying to figure out how to tell Susan that Steve saw Sally naked. Steve is additionally stressed as Susan is attempting to learn his opinions on cushions and fabrics. Finally, the source of Patrick's "car trouble" and Sally's showering escapades are revealed to be a tryst, in which the two of them attempted to have sex at Susan's place.
10	4	"The Melty Man Cometh"	Martin Dennis	Steven Moffat	24 September 2001	IPEA356K
In between flashbacks revealing how Sally and Patrick came to be in Susan's apartment, the guys and girls both analyse Patrick's "car troubles." Sally believes it to be her fault, but Jeff and Steve blame it on "The Melty Man," their Darth Vader-esque personification of erectile dysfunction. Patrick and Sally agree to give things another try, with both independently realizing that they harbor genuine feelings for each other. However, while this firms Patrick's resolve (and erection), it convinces Sally to back out.
11	5	"Jane and the Truth Snake"	Martin Dennis	Steven Moffat	1 October 2001	IPEA359S
Jane is sacked due to her eccentricities, and, after an "overdose" that consists of the appropriate dosage of painkillers, decides to become a children's TV presenter. She shows Sally, Steve, and Susan her new creation: Jake the Snake, a truth-telling sock puppet. However, she loses control of Jake, who expresses her honest opinions of everyone, including her boss (Shaughan Seymour), lately arrived to offer her job back to her. In the end, she retains her job due to popular opinion, with her boss fired instead. Patrick break ups with his latest girl Lynda (Susan Earl) by leaving her an answerphone message, only to discover that she has a genuine interest in a threesome. While he breaks into her flat and deletes the offending message, Lynda fetches her ideal third party: Jeff.
12	6	"Gotcha"	Martin Dennis	Steven Moffat	8 October 2001	IPEA353D
Steve gets a wedding invitation and begins to freak out, as he believes this will plant dreams of wedding bells in Susan's head, especially since they are celebrating their own one-year anniversary that evening. Jane and Sally, invited to the same wedding, fret over the fact that the bride is younger than they are. At the pub, Patrick trips over the mother of an old flame, who seduced him, and attempts to sneak past her; however, when she does not notice him, he charges back in to restore his (perceptions of) virility. She later tells him she remembers him. He apologises to her - but she is horrified that he thinks she was the mother, as she is actually the daughter. Susan consults Jane for tips on keeping Steve's interest, but mostly learns that Jane likes to prank-call him in silence. Steve makes arrangements for Jeff to call him during the date with claims of familial disaster. However, the disruptive phone call actually comes from Susan, who, by pretending to be a silent Jane, gets Steve to confess that he wants to marry her. With a triumphant smile, she declares, "Gotcha--in every sense of the word."
13	7	"Dressed"	Martin Dennis	Steven Moffat	15 October 2001	IPEA354X
Jane meets a handsome man in the bar who invites her to go to his flat. She attends wearing nothing but her coat and shoes, but upon arrival discovers that it is a dinner party which has several guests. Patrick, meeting a competitive co-worker at the bar, wants Sally to pretend to be his wife, but ends up introducing Susan instead when the co-worker's wife turns out to also be blonde. Sally, in revenge, makes Steve her pretend husband. Not able to take all this, Steve proposes to Susan on the spot. She accepts, and the two race off together. (Patrick, with total aplomb, asks Sally to be his next date.)
14	8	"Naked"	Martin Dennis	Steven Moffat	22 October 2001	IPEA357E
Jeff has a flirty encounter with Julia (Lou Gish), a new senior partner at the firm where he and Susan work Both have difficulty expressing their attraction, but are ultimately able to tell each other and kiss. It is Jeff's 30th birthday and his friends are organising a surprise party, to which Julia takes him - blindfolded with a tie. However, her ambiguous promises of "birthday fun" give him the wrong idea, and Jeff ends up stripping in front of them when he expects that she's leading them to a room where they will have sex together. Jeff takes off everything but the tie, in front of the staff and his parents. Julia then sends everyone home so that she can seduce him in private.
15	9	"The End of the Line"	Martin Dennis	Steven Moffat	29 October 2001	IPEA358Y
Susan and Steve's relationship has become complacent; whenever she asks for an opinion, he answers, "It's up to you," and whenever he gets up to go anywhere, she asks, "Where are you going?" Meanwhile, Susan is having issues with her new French client, Giselle, referred to her by Julia. After chewing out Giselle in fluent French, a man starts hitting on her, mistakenly assuming her to be French, and Susan goes along with it instead of setting him straight. She then discovers her mobile phone has lost all its numbers. Attempting to phone Steve in her French accent, she accidentally calls Bruce's Bar and Grill, run by Australian Dick Darlington. He informs her that his establishment is located next to "Susan's Bar," named after an Englishwoman who slept her way across the continent due to her great love of Australians. Susan, believing herself to be said woman, is mortified. The episode then flashes back to view Steve's day, in which he gives his number to a girl at the bar by mistake. To avoid her, he fabricates "Bruce's Bar and Grill" and his identity as Dick Darlington, and is completely fooled by Susan's accent. The episode then flashes back again to earlier that morning, with Julia complaining about Giselle to Jeff, and then calling his mobile in a flirty French accent. However, she accidentally reaches Susan - she and Jeff have identical mobile phones, and they swapped without knowing it at some prior point (thus Susan's missing contacts) - and presents herself as Giselle, leading to Susan's furious rant and the encounter with the other man. After Susan has returned to Steve's place, Steve begs Jeff to claim to be Dick Darlington, while Julia arrives and proclaims herself Giselle. The chain of mistaken identity is broken only when the girl from the bar calls. Everybody hears her conversation with Steve on speakerphone, and Susan, realizing that both she and Steve feel trapped by their life together, decides to leave. "Where are you going," Steve asks her; she replies, "It's up to you."

=== Series 3 (2002) ===
No. overall	No. in series	Title	Directed by	Written by	Original release date	Prod. code
16	1	"Split"	Martin Dennis	Steven Moffat	23 September 2002	ICEC002S
The episode picks up immediately after the events of the previous series, with Susan leaving Steve's apartment. Though he chases after her, she announces that their relationship is over. The remainder of the episode takes place in split screen, with dialogue timed to not overlap. The guys gather at Steve's flat, and the girls at Susan's. Steve attempts to phone Susan several times, but always hangs up on the first ring. Susan, meanwhile, attempts unsuccessfully to pretend she is not waiting for him to call. She also expresses the fatuity of glamour magazines' sexual advice - "A hundred pages of 'Men are useless bastards' and an article on why you should wake them up with a blow job!" - and how much Jane's voice makes her grind her teeth. Finally the trios head out - the boys to a strip club, and the girls to drink wine at the beauty parlour where Sally works. At the end, both Steve and Susan stagger in the door... the same door. While Steve arrived at 12:30 am, left a drunken answerphone message for Susan asking her to return, and passed out in his bed, Susan arrives at 1:30am, hears the message, and enters his room to follow the magazine's advice to the letter, dissolving the split screen and causing the narratives to re-unite. Unbeknown to them, though, a drunk Jeff and Patrick are curled up in the corner... and, even worse, Jane phones, setting Susan's teeth on edge as she fellates Steve.
17	2	"Faithless"	Martin Dennis	Steven Moffat	30 September 2002	ICEC003L
Jeff accepts a date with his colleague Wilma. The others try to guide him through the date remotely by means of an earpiece, but Wilma's cunning ways prove too much for Jeff—and Steve. Jane wants to date James, a religious man, but when she attends one of his meetings, and ridicules all their beliefs in the process, she is shocked to learn that James does not believe in premarital sex.
18	3	"Unconditional Sex"	Martin Dennis	Steven Moffat	7 October 2002	ICEC004F
After an accidental tongue slip inspired by Jane, Jeff manages to worm his way out of Wilma's charm by telling her that his girlfriend is dead and that he is not ready to move on yet. However, she comes to his apartment to continue to try to seduce him. Julia, who was leaving town for a business meeting, has instead stayed at his apartment as she was too ill to travel. Wilma discovers the truth and angrily leaves. Sally and Jane tell Susan about the "man test" where a sexy woman is sent on purpose to try to seduce an attached man to see if he is faithful. Steve is shocked to learn that Susan intends to use the service.
19	4	"Remember This"	Martin Dennis	Steven Moffat	14 October 2002	ICEC005A
After Patrick shows up at Sally's apartment to "save" her from an imaginary spider at three in the morning, they both remember how they first met at a Susan's office party. Their versions differ slightly, as Sally's memory ends with her in Patrick's arms and Patrick's memory ending with a drunk Sally and him kissing to the Spider-Man theme. At the end, Sally and Patrick decide to stop spending so much time together, as nothing will come of it.
20	5	"The Freckle, the Key, and the Couple Who Weren't"	Martin Dennis	Steven Moffat	21 October 2002	ICEC006T
The episode begins with Jeff and Julia trying something kinky while Steve and Susan fight because Steve finds a suspicious looking freckle on his bottom and is upset that Susan has not noticed it. Jane introduces her new celibate boyfriend, James, to the group, when Jeff rushes in, still wearing a black, leather mask (from his and Julia's kinky roleplaying), to ask the group how long "intestines take", meaning how long does it take for something to pass through the body. Jeff realises that he is wearing the mask, so he runs back to Julia, who' is still tied to the bed. Jeff swallowed the key to the handcuffs and as Jeff is talking to Julia about why he ran off, the doorbell rings. As Julia realizes that Jeff has lost the key, her ex-boyfriend, Joe (who has just returned from Iraq) turns up and demands to see her. Joe claims that he is still in a relationship with Julia, despite not having seen her for two years. As the group talks, Jane relaxes Steve by telling him that he has always had that mole. James discovers that Susan was his girlfriend in college. At the end of the episode, James tells Jane that he is going to Germany for a few months.
21	6	"The Girl with One Heart"	Martin Dennis	Steven Moffat	28 October 2002	ICEC007N
Susan redecorates the bathroom and removes the lock on the bathroom door, which Steve freaks out over. Susan and Steve have the gang over for dinner which creates problems for Sally as Patrick brings his girlfriend, Jennifer (Emma Pierson), with him. Sally is not able to be cool with Jennifer as she struggles with her feelings over Patrick. After some misunderstandings, which leaves Jennifer to believe that Sally is a lesbian (which Patrick had falsely told Jennifer) and is interested in her, Sally yells that she is mad about Patrick and quickly leaves.
22	7	"Perhaps, Perhaps, Perhaps"	Martin Dennis	Steven Moffat	4 November 2002	ICEC008H
Worried that she is pregnant, Sally asks all of the girls to take a pregnancy test so that she knows what a negative test looks like. One of the tests is positive, but, as the tests have been mixed up due to Sally's anxiety, there is confusion over who really is pregnant. Susan is quickly ruled out as being pregnant as she and Steve are trying to have a baby, but there is a problem: it would be a miracle if Susan could conceive. Sally and Jane could still be the ones pregnant as Jane had sex with a pizza delivery guy at Jeff's flat a few weeks earlier when she was feeling "desperate" and Jeff had left the flat to help Steve. A week after Sally confessed her love to Patrick, he finally tells her that he loves her as well, as Jane bursts through and gleefully shouts that although she has "shagged and shagged and shagged...all the lil bastards missed". At that moment, James returns from Germany and Sally thinks that she must be the one who is pregnant. As Patrick believes that Sally is pregnant, Susan walks into the bar and tells everybody that Sally is not pregnant and that it is she who is.

=== Series 4 (2004) ===
No. overall	No. in series	Title	Directed by	Written by	Original release date	Prod. code
23	1	"Nine and a Half Minutes"	Martin Dennis	Steven Moffat	10 May 2004	ICEC898P
This episode is told from the perspective of the three different couples, one after the other, each version lasting nine and half minutes. Jane is on a blind date with Oliver Morris (Richard Mylan), the owner of a science fiction bookshop. Susan and Steve, who are arguing about the similarities between the John Hurt moment and birth, mistake him for Jane's gynaecologist. Sally, now Patrick's girlfriend, is forcing Patrick to choose between a last minute golfing trip to Portugal, and sex.
24	2	"Nightlines"	Martin Dennis	Steven Moffat	17 May 2004	ICEC899J
During a five-way phone call between Steve, Susan, Patrick, Sally and Jane, some wild opinions and shocking secrets are revealed within the group, including Patrick having had sex with a woman who was 5 months pregnant. Oliver has not had sex with his ex-girlfriend Tamsin for a year. He discovers she is pregnant during a phone call with Susan.
25	3	"Bed Time"	Martin Dennis	Steven Moffat	24 May 2004	ICEC900S
Patrick tries to find a way to go home after his sexcapades with Sally. When he asks Steve for help, Steve tells him that it cannot be done, especially since that night is the first dinner party Sally is hosting. Meanwhile, Jane has invited Oliver to Sally's dinner party, but he is panicking as his nipples are protruding. A lot. When it becomes obvious that Patrick will be going home at the end of the night, Sally starts drinking; just as everybody is about to leave Sally, clad in a blonde wig and red oven mitts, sings a song about Susan entitled "Susan: The Happy Trotting Elf". The episode ends with Patrick ending up in bed with Sally, his plan to leave in tatters.
26	4	"Circus of the Epidurals"	Martin Dennis	Steven Moffat	31 May 2004	ICEC901L
After Susan asks Sally to be her birth partner, each friend in turn is asked to come to an antenatal class as 'backup'. Susan mulls not using an epidural during her delivery. At the antenatal class led by Jill (first introduced in the episode 'Inferno'), the boys and the girls discuss attitudes to pain relief during birth in separate groups.
27	5	"The Naked Living Room"	Martin Dennis	Steven Moffat	7 June 2004	ICEC902F
Oliver and Jane run into each other at the supermarket, and begin to feel each other out. Oliver says that he is anxious and socially awkward when talking to women he wants to have sex with. Jane asks to come into Oliver's flat, but he realises that he has been single for so long he has simply forgotten to hide his pornography any more. They expose each other emotionally, and when Oliver tells Jane that she "makes up any old rubbish just to get attention", Jane takes all her clothes off. Susan's waters break and she goes into labour.
28	6	"Nine and a Half Months"	Martin Dennis	Steven Moffat	14 June 2004	ICEC903A
After discovering Patrick actually did have sex with Jane, Sally looks through his cupboard to find the tape, but instead finds an engagement ring intended for her amongst the homemade porn videos. Oliver and Jane are about to have sex in her bedroom, but he is put off by a framed photo of Steve near her bed. Steve arrives, letting himself in with the key to the flat that Jane will not take back from him. Susan, now in labour, is with him, and lies on the bed next to Oliver. While Susan is in the hospital waiting to give birth, a sleeping Steve dreams that Jeff returns in female form as Jeffina to comfort him. Steve and Susan have a baby boy, delivered by caesarean section.
