= Coupling (Greek TV series) =

- Created by: Steven Moffat
- Written by: Tina Kampitsi
- Directed by: Stephanos Kodomari
- Country of origin: Greece
- Original language: Greek
- No. of series: 1
- No. of episodes: 10

Production
- Producer: ANOSI (ΑΝΩΣΗ)

Original release
- Network: ANT1
- Release: November 15, 2007 – February 16, 2008

Related
- Coupling (British TV series); Coupling (American TV series); Joking Apart

Coupling is a 2007 Greek remake of the British television sitcom of the same title which aired on ANT1.

The show was directed by Stephanos Kodomari and written by Tina Kampitsi. It started being broadcast on November 15, 2007. The series was then dropped by ANT1 in 16 February 2008 due to low ratings.

== Cast ==
Actors	Characters	British show characters
Yorgos Chraniotis	Markos (Μάρκος)	Jeff Murdock
Leda Matsaggou	Tina (Τίνα)	Sally Harper
Konstantinos Kappas	Paris (Πάρης)	Patrick Maitland
Marios Athanasiou	Stephanos (Στέφανος)	Steve Taylor
Ada Livitsanou	Anna (Αννα)	Susan Walker
Zoe Nalbanti	Tzeni (Τζένη)	Jane Christie
