= Paul Merton in Galton and Simpson's... =

British television comedy series (1996–1997)

- Genre: Comedy; Sitcom
- Written by: Ray Galton; Alan Simpson
- Directed by: Martin Dennis
- Starring: Paul Merton
- Composer: Stefan Girardet
- Country of origin: United Kingdom
- Original language: English
- No. of series: 2
- No. of episodes: 15

Production
- Executive producer: Richard Boden
- Producers: Richard Boden (Series 1); Jamie Rix (Series 2)
- Production locations: London, England, UK
- Running time: 30 minutes (including adverts)
- Production company: Central Independent Television

Original release
- Network: ITV
- Release: 26 January 1996 – 21 October 1997

Paul Merton in Galton and Simpson's... is a British comedy television show that ran from 26 January 1996 to 21 October 1997. It stars Paul Merton, re-performing a number of classic comedy scripts written by the duo Galton and Simpson (Ray Galton and Alan Simpson), including some originally written for Tony Hancock. The programme was produced by Central Independent Television for ITV, and aired for 15 episodes over two series.

Guest stars include Sam Kelly, Geoffrey Whitehead, Adjoa Andoh, Michael Fenton Stevens, Anne Reid, Jim Sweeney, Josie Lawrence, Roger Lloyd-Pack, Michael Jayston, Gary Waldhorn, Katy Carmichael, Brian Murphy, Adjoa Andoh, Matthew Ashforde, Al Ashton, John Baddeley, Patrick Barlow, Paul Bigley, James Bree, Owen Brenman, Dominic Brunt, Rob Brydon, Dennis Clinton, Emma Cunniffe, David Daker, Sheridan Forbes, David Hatton, Arif Hussein, Peter Jeffrey, Peter Jones, Phyllida Law, Rosemary Leach, Denis Lill, Nick Maloney, Geoffrey McGivern, Valerie Minifie, Guy Nicholls, Caroline Quentin (married to Merton at the time), Jason Rose, Mike Sherman, Gwyneth Strong, Stella Tanner, Toni Palmer, Cliff Parisi, Harry Peacock, Nigel Peever, Jeffrey Perry, Nigel Planer and Louisa Rix. Most appear only in a single episode, although some appear in more than one episode playing different characters. Sam Kelly and Geoffrey Whitehead each appear in five episodes.

== Episodes ==
=== Series overview ===
Series	Episodes	Originally released	
Series	Episodes	First released	Last released
1	8	26 January 1996	15 March 1996
2	7	2 September 1997	21 October 1997

=== Series 1 (1996) ===
No.	Title	Original release date
1	"Twelve Angry Men"	26 January 1996
2	"Impasse"	2 February 1996
3	"The Radio Ham"	9 February 1996
4	"Sealed with a Loving Kiss"	16 February 1996
5	"The Missing Page"	23 February 1996
6	"Don't Dilly Dally on the Way"	1 March 1996
7	"The Lift"	8 March 1996
8	"The Bedsitter"	15 March 1996

=== Series 2 (1997) ===
No.	Title	Original release date
9	"The Clerical Error"	2 September 1997
10	"The Wrong Man"	9 September 1997
11	"I Tell You It's Burt Reynolds"	16 September 1997
12	"Visiting Day"	30 September 1997
13	"The Suit"	7 October 1997
14	"Being Sound of Mind"	14 October 1997
15	"Lunch in the Park"	21 October 1997

== Home media ==
All episodes were released on DVD by Network Publishing in a two-disc set on 25 June 2007.
