= Bedtime (disambiguation) =

Bedtime is a parenting tradition to help children feel more secure and become accustomed to a more rigid schedule of sleep than they might prefer.

Bedtime may also refer to:

- "Bedtime" (song), a 1997 R&B song
- Bedtime (TV series), a British comedy-drama television programme
- "Bedtime" (Law & Order: Special Victims Unit), a 2010 American television episode
- "Bed Time" (Coupling), a 2004 British sitcom episode
- "Bedtime", an episode of the TV series Pocoyo
