= Carrie & Barry =

Television series

- Genre: Sitcom; Cringe comedy Romantic comedy Satire
- Created by: Simon Nye
- Written by: Simon Nye
- Directed by: Martin Dennis
- Starring: Neil Morrissey; Claire Rushbrook; Mark Williams; Michelle Gomez; Sarah Quintrell; Mathew Horne
- Opening theme: "Happy Heart" by Andy Williams
- Country of origin: United Kingdom
- Original language: English
- No. of series: 2
- No. of episodes: 12

Production
- Executive producers: Mark Freeland; Beryl Vertue
- Producer: Sue Vertue
- Editor: Mykola Pawluk
- Running time: 30 minutes
- Production company: Hartswood Films

Original release
- Network: BBC One
- Release: 3 September 2004 – 3 December 2005

Carrie & Barry is a British television sitcom first broadcast on BBC One between 2004 and 2005. Written by Simon Nye, it stars Neil Morrissey and Claire Rushbrook.

Produced by Hartswood Films, it reunited Morrissey with writer Simon Nye, executive producer Beryl Vertue and director Martin Dennis. It was produced by Sue Vertue.

Neil Morrissey plays part-time taxi driver Barry and Claire Rushbrook is his beautician wife Carrie. The couple find themselves with the daily challenges of keeping the spice in their marriage and the fun in their day jobs – as well as having to deal with Barry's teenage daughter Sinéad (Sarah Quintrell) from his disastrous first marriage. In an interview for Best magazine in 2012 Neil Morrissey stated that this role remains the one role of which he is the most proud.

Mark Williams plays Barry's mate Kirk, who co-owns his black cab (he does the night shifts) whilst Michelle Gomez is Carrie's acid-tongued best friend and fellow beautician Michelle.
