= 100 Questions =

2010 American television sitcom

- Intertitle
- Also known as: 100 Questions for Charlotte Payne
- Genre: Sitcom
- Created by: Christopher Moynihan
- Directed by: Alex Hardcastle
- Starring: Sophie Winkleman; David Walton; Christopher Moynihan; Collette Wolfe; Smith Cho; Michael Benjamin Washington
- Theme music composer: Transcenders
- Country of origin: United States
- Original language: English
- No. of seasons: 1
- No. of episodes: 6

Production
- Executive producers: Christopher Moynihan; Michelle Nader; Kelly Kulchak; Ron West
- Producer: Franco Bario
- Production location: New York City
- Camera setup: Multi-camera
- Running time: 22 minutes
- Production companies: Bicycle Path Productions; TagLine Television; Universal Media Studios; Open 4 Business Productions

Original release
- Network: NBC
- Release: May 27 – July 1, 2010

100 Questions (originally known as 100 Questions for Charlotte Payne) is an American sitcom television series which ran on NBC from May 27 to July 1, 2010. In May 2009 the network announced that the show would debut midseason in March 2010 on Tuesday nights at 9:30 pm, after NBC's coverage of the 2010 Winter Olympics was completed. However the show was later pushed back to debut on May 27, 2010, with the episode order reduced from thirteen to six. 100 Questions was produced by Universal Media Studios, with executive producers Christopher Moynihan, Kelly Kulchak, Ron West, and Michelle Nader.

On July 8, 2010, NBC cancelled the series after one season.

== Plot ==
100 Questions is about "a young woman navigating life with friends in New York." Charlotte Payne (played by British actress Sophie Winkleman) begins each episode being asked a question at a dating service, which then "segues into that episode's storyline."

== Cast ==
- Sophie Winkleman as Charlotte Payne
- David Walton as Wayne Rutherford
- Christopher Moynihan as Mike Poole
- Collette Wolfe as Jill
- Smith Cho as Leslie
- Michael Benjamin Washington as Andrew

== Production ==
The initial pilot episode was directed by Emmy Award-winning director James Burrows and produced by Maggie Blanc. It featured Elizabeth Ho as Leslie, Joy Suprano as Jill, and Amir Talai as Andrew. Alex Hardcastle subsequently stepped in as director for the series, reshooting the pilot with recasts Cho, Wolfe, and Washington as Leslie, Jill, and Andrew.

== Episodes ==
Every episode of the series was directed by Alex Hardcastle.

No.	Title	Written by	Original release date	Viewers (millions)
1	"What Brought You Here?"	Christopher Moynihan	May 27, 2010	2.52
Charlotte turns down her boyfriend's proposal; Mike and Wayne compete to see who has the best pick-up line; Leslie dates an albino.
2	"Are You Open Minded?"	Danielle Sanchez-Witzel	June 3, 2010	2.23
Mike's new girlfriend hits on Charlotte and Leslie becomes obsessed with a pair of boots.
3	"Are You Romantic?"	Christopher Moynihan	June 10, 2010	2.29
Charlotte realises the man of her dreams is more like the man of her nightmares.
4	"Have You Ever Dated a Bad Boy?"	Hunter Covington	June 17, 2010	2.05
Charlotte relates the story of Luke, her biker boyfriend; Mike takes one for the team.
5	"Wayne?"	Liz Astrof & Al Higgins	June 24, 2010	1.83
Charlotte tells the story of how she first met Wayne. Leslie finds out that her ex, Jeffrey, is getting married.
6	"Have You Ever Had a One-Night Stand?"	Michelle Nader	July 1, 2010	1.89
Charlotte and Wayne compete to see who can have a one-night stand first.

== Ratings ==
=== Seasonal ===
Cast of original 2009 pilot

Season	Timeslot (ET)	Season premiere	Season finale	TV season	Rank	Viewers (in millions)
1	Thursday 8:30pm	May 27, 2010	July 1, 2010	2010	TBA	2.135

=== Episodic ===
Order	Episode	Airdate	Rating	Share	Rating/Share (18-49)	Viewers (millions)	Rank (Timeslot)	Rank (Night)
1	"What Brought You Here?"	May 27, 2010	1.7	3	0.8/3	2.52	4	14
2	"Are You Open Minded?"	June 3, 2010	1.5	3	0.9/3	2.23	4	14
3	"Are You Romantic?"	June 10, 2010	1.6	3	0.8/3	2.29	4	12
4	"Have You Ever Dated a Bad Boy?"	June 17, 2010	1.4	3	0.7/2	2.05	4	11
5	"Wayne?"	June 24, 2010	1.3	2	0.6/2	1.83	5	12
6	"Have You Ever Had a One Night Stand?"	July 1, 2010	1.2	2	0.7/3	1.89	4	14
