= Is It Legal? =

British television sitcom

- Created by: Simon Nye
- Directed by: Martin Dennis
- Starring: Patrick Barlow; Imelda Staunton; Richard Lumsden; Kate Isitt; Jeremy Clyde; Matthew Ashforde
- Country of origin: United Kingdom
- Original language: English
- No. of series: 3
- No. of episodes: 21

Production
- Running time: 25 minutes
- Production company: Hartswood Films for Carlton

Original release
- Network: ITV (Series 1 & 2); Channel 4 (Series 3)
- Release: 12 September 1995 – 9 December 1998

Is It Legal? is a British television sitcom set in a solicitors office in Hounslow, west London, which ran from 12 September 1995 to 9 December 1998. It was produced by Hartswood Films and was shown on ITV for Series 1–2 and Channel 4 for Series 3. It was written by Simon Nye, who also wrote other ITV sitcoms such as Men Behaving Badly and Hardware. It is based in the ramshackle and chaotic solicitors office of Lotus, Spackman and Phelps; it chronicles the trials, misadventures and miscarriages of justice, as the staff strive through one problem after another. When questioned about the accuracy of the series, Nye responded "don't expect an accurate portrayal of legal work. It's basically about working in an office in a less than exciting part of the world." The premise behind the series was to portray the monotonous atmosphere of office life and the constant workplace tension between the colleagues. Nye later noted "a solicitors' office seemed to be an ideal setting because they have people constantly passing through who are upset or in a state of tension or personal disaster and that's a rich vein of comedy."

== Cast ==
- Patrick Barlow – Bob Birch
- Richard Lumsden – Colin Lotus
- Imelda Staunton – Stella Phelps
- Jeremy Clyde – Dick Spackman (Series 1–2)
- Kate Isitt – Alison
- Matthew Ashforde – Darren
- Nicole Arumugam – Sarah Chivers

== Guest stars ==
- John Thomson – Paramedic in "Death In Hounslow"
- Jono Coleman – Radio DJ in "Hounslow FM"
- Ben Miles – Tom in "Alison Gets Laid"
- Chris Langham – Mr Etherington in "Darren's Revenge"
- Alexander Armstrong – Nick in "New Bloke"
- Kate Lonergan – Mrs Beath in "Office Party"

== Characters ==
=== Colin Lotus ===
Colin Lotus is the junior partner of the firm and succeeded his father once he had retired. Colin is very proud to be a solicitor and is enthusiastic about his work, but, unfortunately, he is naive, accident-prone and often makes stupid mistakes. Usually Bob resolves Colin’s messes.

Colin is very helpful to the rest of the firm despite the fact that they all think he is annoying and that he is very strange. He is a bachelor but has a dog, Tucker. He remained a bachelor despite having a one-night stand in "Office Party" with the wife of an imprisoned client. In "Glad To Be Colin" and "New Bloke", he started a relationship with Sarah who had appeared in the previous two series as the delivery girl from Mr. Bappy, the sandwich shop that was below the office. As a result, there was tension between Colin and Bob, as Bob previously had a crush on Sarah and contemplated pursuing a romantic relationship with her.

=== Dick Spackman ===
Dick Spackman is one of the senior partners of the firm, but his knowledge of law is limited. Dick is very arrogant and often disregards others to make his life more convenient. Most of his time is spent in his office drinking glasses of sherry, watching golf on the television and not doing any work. He sees his position in the firm as bringing the work in, which is then completed by Stella, Bob or Colin. Dick's last appearance in the series was in the episode "Indecision." In the series 3 episode, "A Question of Pants", it was revealed that Dick had taken early retirement, resulting in Stella being the firm’s sole senior partner.

=== Stella Phelps ===
Stella Phelps is a senior partner of the firm. She had an ambition of being a solicitor since childhood, and she always tried to succeed in being the most professional solicitor. However, the rest of the firm, especially partners Colin and Dick, hold her back because of their inept attitude towards law and the legal profession. She is forceful and frequently hot-tempered, which causes friction with her colleagues.

=== Bob Birch ===
The office manager of Lotus, Spackman & Phelps, Bob is endearing yet dithering tends toward bossiness and is a bit of a prude, all of which tend to grate on many of his colleagues.

He fell in love with Sarah, a worker at the sandwich shop, Mr. Bappy, which is located in the same building as the firm. Bob pursued her—despite her apparent lack of interest and his allergy to bread products. This eventually led to the dissolution of his marriage and a drawer full of odd-flavoured baps. During the third series, he and Stella became a couple.

=== Alison ===
Alison is the stroppy secretary who has a job at the firm only because her estate agent boyfriend sends it many clients who need conveyancing services. She is constantly bored and likes to annoy the other personnel of the firm, particularly Bob because of his crush on Sarah.

=== Darren ===
Darren is the firm’s office assistant and general jack-of-all-trades. Generally seen as incompetent at his job, he remains on good terms with Bob and Colin despite Stella’s obvious dislike of him. The object of his affections is Alison.

== Episodes ==
=== Series 1 (1995) ===
No. overall	No. in series	Title	Original release date
1	1	"Death in Hounslow"	12 September 1995
Colin starts his first day at Lotus, Spackman & Phelps and accidentally kills a client, Stella has to settle a dispute over who gets to keep their dog and Bob tries desperately to piece together files that were shredded. Guest stars: Charles Simon (Mr Dobson), John Thomson (Paramedic), Rupert Bates (Man with Dog), Cate Fowler (Woman with Dog)
2	2	"Whodunnit?"	19 September 1995
Stella gets arrested for drink-driving and Bob tries to discover who has photocopied their bottom. Guest stars: Darren Tunstall (Policeman), Billie Reynolds (Jacinta)
3	3	"Dick’s House of Horror"	26 September 1995
Dick buys a new house which hasn't been surveyed properly, Darren tries to celebrate his birthday and Alison tries to stay awake. Guest stars: Michael Troughton, (Mr Arnold), Alan Talbot (Homeowner)
4	4	"Colin Heals the World"	3 October 1995
Colin goes to court to promote the firm and meets a prostitute while Stella tries to win £40,000 in compensation for her client. Guest stars: Mark Lewis (Detective Inspector), Charlotte Weston (Jane), Iain Mitchell (Giles Brindley-Sherman)
5	5	"Infatuation"	10 October 1995
Lotus, Spackman and Phelps has a person on work experience and is popular with everyone except Bob while Darren tries to sue Mr. Bappy for food poisoning. Guest stars: Raymond Coulthard (Peter)
6	6	"Bob Breaks In"	17 October 1995
Bob has to break into his own house to retrieve some documents while Dick has stolen £30,000 from a client to buy a boat. Guest stars: Patricia Garwood (Belinda Foulkes)
7	7	"Resignation"	24 October 1995
Stella is considering her resignation from the firm which Colin and Dick find out about while Bob still tries to win Sarah's heart.

=== Series 2 (1996) ===
No. overall	No. in series	Title	Original release date
8	1	"Solicitors in Love"	24 October 1996
Bob's marriage continues to fall apart while Stella has a new man in her life. Guest stars: David Hounslow (Policeman)
9	2	"Hounslow FM"	31 October 1996
Dick has been invited to solve legal problems on the local radio station while Colin plans his annual holiday. Guest stars: Jono Coleman (DJ)
10	3	"Alison Gets Laid"	7 November 1996
Stella questions whether anyone in the firm actually likes her while Alison sleeps with Sarah's boyfriend. Guest stars: Ben Miles (Tom)
11	4	"Darren’s Revenge"	14 November 1996
Lotus, Spackman, and Phelps are moving with the times as they try and use computers, Stella and Colin are forced to play golf with a wealthy client and Darren discovers he might be sacked. Guest stars: Chris Langham (David Etherington)
12	5	"Dick in Court"	21 November 1996
Dick is forced to represent one of Stella's clients in court, Colin brings his dog to work and Bob finally gets a date with Sarah.
14	6	"Office Party"	28 November 1996
Lotus, Spackman, and Phelps are holding their annual office party which they soon regret while a prisoner has requested Colin to be his solicitor. Guest stars: Ian Bartholomew (Terry Beath), Kate Lonergan (Mrs Beath)
15	7	"Indecision"	5 December 1996
A rival firm has offered to buy Lotus, Spackman and Phelps where it falls on Colin to make a decision while Bob tries to decide whether to give his marriage a chance or to go on a date with Sarah.

=== Series 3 (1998) ===
No. overall	No. in series	Title	Original release date
16	1	"A Question of Pants"	28 October 1998
Dick has retired so Colin has been given his old office while Darren wonders whether Alison, whose bra is peeping out for much of the episode, wears any knickers.
17	2	"Polishing the Mouse"	4 November 1998
Darren is caught masturbating in Stella's office while Stella celebrates being at the firm for twenty years.
18	3	"Big Desk Bob"	11 November 1998
Bob has his uncle's desk delivered to the office while he and Stella try to keep their relationship a secret from everybody else.
19	4	"Glad To Be Colin"	18 November 1998
Colin questions his sexuality while Sarah returns to the office which makes Bob pleased and Stella jealous.
20	5	"New Bloke"	25 November 1998
A new solicitor has joined the firm who annoys Stella but charms everyone else while Darren decides to change his name. Guest stars: Alexander Armstrong (Nick Bairstow)
21	6	"Someone Is Lying"	2 December 1998
Colin decides to hold a house party but at the end of the night one hundred pounds has gone missing and tries to find out who has stolen it. Guest stars: Andrew Clover (Steve), Louise Rolfe (Yvonne)
22	7	"1979"	9 December 1998
Darren is asked to retrieve a box of files dating from 1979 and in it there's a discovery of a nineteen-year-old secret.

== Filming locations ==
Interior shots were filmed at Teddington Studios in south-west London

Exterior shots were filmed in and around Staines and Walton-on-Thames.

== Awards ==
It won the British Comedy Award for "Best ITV Sitcom" in 1995.

== DVD releases ==
All three series of Is It Legal? were released on DVD by Network between September 2010 - March 2011. The complete series boxset was released by Network on 9 July 2018.

DVD	Release date
The Complete Series 1	13 September 2010
The Complete Series 2	17 January 2011
The Complete Series 3	21 March 2011
The Complete Series 1 to 3 Box Set	9 July 2018
