= Grass (TV series) =

British television sitcom

- Written by: Andrew Collins; Simon Day
- Directed by: Martin Dennis
- Starring: Simon Day; Robert Wilfort; Philip Jackson; Tristan Gemmill; Matthew Ashforde
- Composer: Joby Talbot
- Country of origin: United Kingdom
- Original language: English
- No. of series: 1
- No. of episodes: 8

Production
- Executive producer: Jon Plowman
- Producer: Alex Walsh-Taylor
- Editor: Paul Machliss
- Running time: 30 minutes

Original release
- Network: BBC Three
- Release: 8 September – 27 October 2003

Related
- The Fast Show

Grass is a sitcom starring Simon Day which originally aired in 2003 on BBC Three. Day plays Billy Bleach, a Londoner and pub know-it-all who is relocated to Norfolk in rural England under a witness protection programme after he witnesses a gangland killing. The first episode aired on 8 September 2003. The series was a spin-off from The Fast Show.

== Cast ==
- Simon Day as Billy Bleach
- Robert Wilfort as PC Harriet
- Philip Jackson as DCI Maddox
- Tristan Gemmill as DI Veal
- Matthew Ashforde as Darren
- Josephine Butler as Jemima
- David Webber as Youssou
- Mark Williams as Ben
- William Thomas as Eric
- Vilma Hollingbery as Rose
- Liam Hess as Crispin
- Alex Lowe as Roland
- Andrew Clover as David the Poacher
- Lynette McMorrough as Mrs. Harriet

== Episodes ==
No.	Title	Original release date
1	"Episode One"	8 September 2003
2	"Episode Two"	15 September 2003
3	"Episode Three"	22 September 2003
4	"Episode Four"	29 September 2003
5	"Episode Five"	6 October 2003
6	"Episode Six"	13 October 2003
7	"Episode Seven"	20 October 2003
8	"Episode Eight"	27 October 2003
