= Martin Dennis =

Canadian-born British television director

- Born: Toronto, Ontario, Canada
- Education: University of Birmingham
- Occupation: Television director
- Years active: 1980–present
- Employer: BBC

Martin Dennis is a Canadian-born award-winning British television director specialising in situation comedy. He won the BAFTA award for situation comedy for Black Books in 2005, having been nominated previously in 1989, 1996, and 1998 respectively.

== Early life and education ==
Dennis was born in Toronto and lived there briefly until his family moved to Surrey. He graduated from the Department of Drama and Theatre Arts at the University of Birmingham alongside his fellow and now well-known award-winning contemporaries - stage and screen directors Phyllida Lloyd and Andy Wilson, producer Sarah Curtis, actor and director Owen Brenman and stage and screen designer Mark Thompson. Stage and screen writer-directors Victoria Wood and Terry Johnson had graduated from the Department in preceding years.

== Career ==
Dennis joined the BBC in 1980 as a runner. He soon became a production manager and was part of the crew behind 'Allo, 'Allo, Don't Wait Up, and Hi-De-Hi. In 1987, Dennis became the director of 'Allo, 'Allo!, which he continued to work for until the conclusion of the series 6. In 1990, he moved to Central where he directed the first three series of The Upper Hand, an adaption of the American sitcom Who's the Boss? Upon concluding his involvement on the show, in late 1991 he directed the first series of Men Behaving Badly for Hartswood Films, and went on to direct all the subsequent series and specials. Dennis would go onto colloborate with the show's writer/ creator Simon Nye on a number of other projects including Is It Legal?, My Wonderful Life, Beast, The Savages and Carrie & Barry. Dennis has directed a number of comedy series for other writers including Downwardly Mobile, My Good Friend, Paul Merton In Galton & Simpson's..., Hippies, Coupling, Black Books, Baddiel's Syndrome, Grass, Mike Bassett: Manager, Fear, Stress & Anger, How Not to Live Your Life, Never Better, Life of Riley, The Job Lot, Bad Move and two episodes of The Vicar of Dibley.

In 2007, he directed The Return of 'Allo, 'Allo!, a one off special featuring newly filmed scenes, clips from the series and interviews with cast members.

Between 2012-20, Dennis directed 27 episodes of the long running comedy series Friday Night Dinner on Channel 4. He later directed two series of Birds of a Feather, when it was revived by ITV in 2014. In 2016, Dennis directed a one-off revival episode of Goodnight Sweetheart, which picks up the story in 1962, where Gary Sparrow finds himself catapulted into 2016 after being stuck in the past for 17 years. In recent years, he directed two series of The Goes Wrong Show between 2019-2021 which featured the original members of the Mischief Theatre company as the fictional "Cornley Polytechnic Drama Society" staging a series of 'live' televised plays, often with disatarous results.

== Selected filmography ==
- 'Allo 'Allo! (1987-9)
- The Upper Hand (1990-2)
- Men Behaving Badly (1992-8)
- Downwardly Mobile (1994)
- My Good Friend (1995)
- Is It Legal? (1995-8)
- Paul Merton in Galton and Simpson's... (1996-7)
- My Wonderful Life (1998-9)
- Hippies (1999)
- Beast (2000-1)
- Coupling (2000-4)
- Baddiel's Syndrome (2001)
- The Savages (2001)
- Black Books (2002-4)
- Grass (2003)
- Carrie & Barry (2004-5)
- The Vicar of Dibley (2004-5)
- Mike Bassett: Manager (2005)
- Life Begins (2006)
- City Lights (2007)
- Fear, Stress & Anger (2007)
- Never Better (2008)
- How Not to Live Your Life (2009)
- Me and My Monsters (2010)
- Friday Night Dinner (2012-20)
- The Job Lot (2013)
- Birds of a Feather (2014-7)
- Goodnight Sweetheart (2016)
- Bad Move (2017)
- The Goes Wrong Show (2019-21)
