= Beryl Vertue =

English television producer (1931–2022)

Beryl Vertue CBE
- Born: Beryl Frances Johnson; 8 April 1931; Mitcham, Surrey, England
- Died: 12 February 2022 (aged 90); South Kensington, London, England
- Occupations: Television producer, media executive, agent
- Works: Produced Men Behaving Badly
- Spouse: Clements Vertue (m. 1951; div. 1984)
- Children: 2, including Sue
- Relatives: Steven Moffat (son-in-law)

Beryl Frances Vertue CBE (née Johnson; 8 April 1931 – 12 February 2022) was an English television producer, media executive, and agent. She was founder and chairman of the independent television production company Hartswood Films.

== Early life and career ==
Beryl Frances Johnson was born in Mitcham, Surrey on 8 April 1931. She attended Mitcham county school, and left at 15 to take a typing course. She began her working life as a secretary in a shipping firm, and remained here for six years until she contracted tuberculosis. She was sent to a sanatorium on the Isle of Wight. Shortly after her recovery, a school friend, Alan Simpson, invited her to join Associated London Scripts (ALS) as a secretary and she began working with the writers' cooperative in 1955. She was reluctant to work there, as it was an hour-long commute from her home. She asked for what she thought would be a prohibitive sum of ten pounds a week, and to her horror they agreed.

She started by typing up Spike Milligan's scripts for The Goon Show. Later she was tasked with phoning (negotiating?) the BBC regarding contracts for Simpson and his colleague Ray Galton. She managed to negotiate a doubling of their income for Hancock's Half Hour. After this she became their chief negotiator and agent, almost by accident, representing Galton and Simpson as well as the comedy writers Spike Milligan, Eric Sykes, Johnny Speight and Terry Nation (for whom she negotiated to keep partial rights to his Dalek creation for Doctor Who). She also represented comedians Tony Hancock (until 1961) and Frankie Howerd.

Howerd's career was in eclipse, and he was considering changing occupation by running a pub. She managed to dissuade him, and got him a booking at the Blue Angel, a London nightclub, which revived his career.

== Later career ==
In 1967, Vertue was invited by Robert Stigwood to join his company, which had absorbed ALS, and became deputy chairman. Sykes and Milligan ended their professional relationship with Vertue at this change, though she continued to represent Galton, Simpson and Howerd.

Working under the new arrangement, she became an executive producer for the newly created Associated London Films. The first production was The Plank (1967), Sykes' wordless silent film. In this role, Vertue was involved in film spin-offs of television comedies of writers with whom she had previously worked. Meanwhile, she sold British television formats to the United States. These successes included Steptoe and Son, which became Sanford and Son in the U.S., and Till Death Us Do Part, which was turned into All in the Family. In 1975, she was a co-executive producer of the cinema version of The Who's rock opera Tommy, directed by Ken Russell and starring Roger Daltrey. The film company lasted for eight years, after which she continued with the Robert Stigwood Organisation as executive vice-president, producing programmes for American television.

Stigwood sent her to negotiate with Ike Turner in order to allow Tina Turner to appear in Tommy. She promised they would take good care of Tina, and then thanked him before he had had a chance to consent. Her powers of persuasion were so good that he agreed.

Vertue formed Hartswood Films in 1979. It has produced many comedies, including Men Behaving Badly, Is It Legal?, and Coupling, the latter written by her son-in-law Steven Moffat. She also served as executive producer of their dramatic series Sherlock, which Moffat also co-created. Her daughter, Sue Vertue, produced the series.

== Personal life and death ==
Vertue married her childhood sweetheart Clem Vertue in 1951. They divorced amicably in 1984. The couple had two daughters: Sue and Debbie. Sue became a television producer and married writer/producer Steven Moffat, of Doctor Who and Sherlock fame. Debbie became operations director at Hartswood.

Vertue died from ischaemic heart disease and chronic obstructive pulmonary disease at the Cromwell Hospital in South Kensington, London, on 12 February 2022, aged 90.

== Honours and awards ==
Vertue was appointed Officer of the Order of the British Empire (OBE) in the 2000 New Year Honours for services to television and Commander of the Order of the British Empire (CBE) in the 2016 New Year Honours for services to television drama. In 2004, she received the British Academy Television Awards (BAFTA) Alan Clarke Award for Outstanding Creative Contribution to Television.

Vertue was conferred a Lifetime Achievement Award at the Royal Television Society Programme Awards on 20 March 2012. Ten days later, she was presented with the Harvey Lee Award for Outstanding Contribution to Broadcasting at the BPG TV and Radio Awards.

== Filmography ==
- The Spy with a Cold Nose (1966) – production associate
- The Plank (1967) – executive producer
- Till Death Us Do Part (1968) – executive producer
- Up Pompeii (1971) – executive producer
- Steptoe and Son (1972) – executive producer
- Up the Chastity Belt (1972) – executive producer
- Up the Front (1972) – executive producer
- The Alf Garnett Saga (1972) – executive producer
- And No One Could Save Her (1973; TV movie) – executive producer
- The House in Nightmare Park (1973) – executive producer
- Steptoe and Son Ride Again (1973) – executive producer
- Mousey (1974; TV movie) – executive producer
- Tommy (1975) – executive producer
- Beacon Hill (1975; TV series) – executive producer
- The Entertainer (1975; TV movie) – executive producer
- Almost Anything Goes (1975–76; TV series) – executive producer
- Sparkle (1976) – executive producer
- The Prime of Miss Jean Brodie (1978; TV series) – executive producer
- Charleston (1979; TV movie) – executive producer
- Parole (1982; TV movie) – producer
- Codename: Kyril (1988; TV miniseries) – producer
- Men Behaving Badly (1992–98) – producer
- A Woman's Guide to Adultery (1993; TV series) – producer
- The English Wife (1995; TV movie) – producer
- My Good Friend (1995–96; TV series) – producer
- Is It Legal? (1995–98; TV series) – producer
- Men Behaving Badly (1996–97; TV series) – executive consultant
- Officers and Gentlemen (1997; documentary) – producer
- The Red Baron (1998; documentary) – producer
- In Love with Elizabeth (1998; documentary) – producer
- Wonderful You (1999; TV miniseries) – producer
- Border Cafe (2000; TV miniseries) – executive producer
- Coupling (2000–2004; TV series) – executive producer
- The War Behind the Wire (2000; TV series; documentary) – producer
- The Savages (2001; TV series) – executive producer
- The Welsh Great Escape (2003; TV movie) – producer
- Carrie & Barry (2004–05; TV series) – executive producer
- Supernova (2005–06; TV Series) – executive producer
- After Thomas (2006; TV movie) – executive producer
- The Lift (2007; TV movie) – executive producer
- Biffovision (2007; TV movie) – executive producer
- Jekyll (2007; miniseries) – executive producer
- The Cup (2008; TV series) – executive producer
- What's Virgin Mean? (2008) – executive producer
- Love at First Sight (2010) – executive producer
- Sherlock (2010–17; TV series) – executive producer
- Me and Mrs Jones (2012; TV series) – executive producer
- The Guilty (2013; miniseries) – executive producer
- Edge of Heaven (2014; TV series) – executive producer
- Lady Chatterley's Lover (2015; TV movie) – executive producer
