= Downwardly Mobile =

1994 British television sitcom series

- Genre: Sitcom
- Written by: Alistair Beaton; Barry Pilton
- Directed by: Martin Dennis
- Starring: Frances de la Tour; Philip Jackson; Stephen Tompkinson; Josie Lawrence
- Country of origin: United Kingdom
- Original language: English
- No. of series: 1
- No. of episodes: 7

Production
- Executive producer: David Reynolds
- Producer: Philip Hinchcliffe
- Running time: 30 minutes
- Production companies: Portman Productions; Yorkshire Television

Original release
- Network: ITV
- Release: 21 July – 1 September 1994

Downwardly Mobile is a British television sitcom series produced by Portman Productions in association with Yorkshire Television. It aired on ITV from 21 July to 1 September 1994. Starring Frances de la Tour, Philip Jackson, Stephen Tompkinson and Josie Lawrence, it was written by Alistair Beaton and Barry Pilton and directed by Martin Dennis.

== Cast ==
- Frances de la Tour as Rosemary
- Philip Jackson as Clem
- Stephen Tompkinson as Mark
- Josie Lawrence as Sophie

== Episodes ==
1. "Another Black Wednesday" (21 July 1994)
2. "Just a Few Essentials" (28 July 1994)
3. "Underarm Combat" (4 August 1994)
4. "Out of Their Depth" (11 August 1994)
5. "A Slow Buck" (18 August 1994)
6. "Troubles with My Aunt" (25 August 1994)
7. "Grapefruit and Roses" (1 September 1994)
