= Man Up! =

2011 American sitcom television series

- Genre: Sitcom
- Created by: Christopher Moynihan
- Written by: Christopher Moynihan
- Starring: Mather Zickel; Dan Fogler; Christopher Moynihan; Henry Simmons; Teri Polo; Amanda Detmer
- Composer: John Kimbrough
- Country of origin: United States
- Original language: English
- No. of seasons: 1
- No. of episodes: 13

Production
- Executive producers: Christopher Moynihan; Beth McCarthy-Miller; Kelly Kulchak; Ron West; Victor Fresco
- Camera setup: Single-camera
- Running time: 30 minutes
- Production companies: Garfield Grove; Bicycle Path Productions; Tagline Television; ABC Studios

Original release
- Network: ABC
- Release: October 18 – December 6, 2011

Man Up! is an American sitcom that aired on ABC from October 18 to December 6, 2011. On December 8, ABC announced the series had been cancelled due to low ratings. Only 8 episodes were aired on television, though all 13 episodes were available online. The episodes remained online through the end of January 2012, when they were removed from ABC's website. All 13 episodes are available to stream on Hulu as of February 2018.

== Plot ==
The series revolves around the lives of three modern men in Columbus, Ohio who try to get in touch with their inner "tough guys" and redefine what it means to be a "real man". According to an on-screen graphic at the start of the pilot, the show is set in suburban Gahanna.

== Cast ==
=== Main cast ===
- Amanda Detmer as Brenda Hayden
- Christopher Moynihan as Craig Griffith
- Dan Fogler as Kenny Hayden
- Charlotte Labadie as Lucy Keen
- Henry Simmons as Grant Sweet
- Mather Zickel as Will Keen
- Teri Polo as Theresa Hayden Keen

=== Recurring cast ===
- Jason Rogel as Henry Trunka
- Jake Johnson as Nathan Keen

== Production ==
The series was poised to be one of the four breakout hits for the 2011-12 television season (along with CBS's 2 Broke Girls, A Gifted Man, and How to Be a Gentleman) according to advertisers who had seen the pilot. Of the four shows, only 2 Broke Girls, which specifically had no male leads unlike the other three shows, was renewed for a second season.

== Episodes ==
No.	Title	Directed by	Written by	Original release date	Prod. code	U.S. viewers (millions)
1	"Pilot"	Beth McCarthy-Miller	Christopher Moynihan	October 18, 2011	101	7.78
Will tries to find the perfect gift, that expresses manliness, for his son's 13th birthday. Meanwhile, Kenny becomes jealous of his ex-wife's new boyfriend, Grant, who attends the party. Elsewhere, Craig pines for an ex-girlfriend, who is getting married the same day.
2	"Finessing the Bromance"	Beth McCarthy-Miller	Christopher Moynihan	October 25, 2011	102	6.74
Kenny gets jealous when Will and Grant strike up an unlikely "bromance". Things go from bad to worse when he finds out Grant is coming to the weekly Keen Sunday dinner. In an attempt to strike some common ground, the guys try a Star Wars screening.
3	"Digging Deeper"	Alex Hardcastle	Victor Fresco	November 1, 2011	104	6.36
When roommates Kenny and Craig clash, Will suggests they try doing a project together, but that simple suggestion turns into the pair trying to dig their own swimming pool.
4	"Wingmen"	Bryan Gordon	Ric Swartzlander	November 8, 2011	103	6.22
When Kenny admits he hasn't had a date since his divorce from Brenda and that she is the only woman he has ever slept with, the guys, including Grant, take him clubbing to jumpstart his love life.
5	"Acceptance"	Eyal Gordin	Franklin Hardy & Shane Kosakowski	November 15, 2011	106	6.27
As a rite of passage, Will decides to buy his son, Nathan, a cell phone, which in turn gives Brenda the idea to also purchase one for Grant to replace his old brick phone. Kenny is nervous about meeting his new girlfriend Jane's parents.
6	"High Road Is the Guy Road"	Michael Trim	Kat Likkel & John Hoberg	November 22, 2011	105	6.29
Theresa wants to save the Science Club at Nathan's school, which forces Will, Kenny and Craig to face a high school bully, Dennis.
7	"Disciplining the Keens"	John Scott	Barbie Adler	November 29, 2011	107	6.59
After they find out that Nathan's allergic, the whole family goes on a gluten-free diet, which leads to a weird competition between Will and Theresa to see who can keep the diet up longer, and for Brenda, who's trying to convince health-conscious Grant that she can live without it. The problem is that they are all cheating. Meanwhile, it's all fast food, all the time for Craig and Kenny as they romance two ladies who work at Big Burger.
8	"Men and Their Chickens"	John Fortenberry	Shawn Simmons	December 6, 2011	109	4.82
Will hopes that adopting a baby chick for little Lucy will be a "teachable moment" about where food comes from, but things get out of hand when all of the guys decide they want to adopt chicks too; Craig dates an attractive doctor, but finds himself intimidated by her bully of a son.
9	"Camping"	Beth McCarthy-Miller	Michael Shipley	December 13, 2011 (online)	108	N/A
The guys camp out at a department store to buy a video game. Will finds out his son is also camping out with his friends and decides to scare him so he won't lie to him again.
10	"Fear"	Eyal Gordin	Michael Shipley	December 13, 2011 (online)	110	N/A
Will installs a new home security system, but instead of making everyone feel safer, the system keeps tripping and wreaks havoc in all of their lives. Meanwhile, Craig reconnects with Lisa, the girl whose wedding he broke up, and Grant convinces Kenny to play a "trust the universe" game with him with his new GPS, letting the GPS randomly select their destination. Kenny is convinced it will eventually lead to disaster, but instead he and Grant end up on a series of wild adventures, which eventually finds Kenny meeting his Star Wars hero, Billy Dee Williams.
11	"Up All Night"	Alex Hardcastle	Ric Swartzlander	December 13, 2011 (online)	111	N/A
Because Will's late night video game sessions with the guys have been keeping Theresa up at night, Kenny gives Will a pill that will help her sleep, but the medication has odd side effects and the guys have to keep the house in order.
12	"Letting Go"	Lee Shallat-Chemel	Kat Likkel & John Hoberg	December 13, 2011 (online)	112	N/A
Theresa tries to force her brother to throw away a car that their father gave him. Meanwhile, because Will can't see anything through to the end, he chooses the feud between him and Kenny to be the first thing he does see through to the end.
13	"Be Who You're Not"	Beth McCarthy-Miller	Barbie Adler	December 13, 2011 (online)	113	N/A
Will's promotion causes his wife and brother to lie in an executive club. Meanwhile, Craig needs to act gay in front of his boss or risk being fired, and he does so by using Grant without him knowing. Will struggles with his promotion after he is asked to fire a fellow co-worker.

== Critical reception ==
The series received mixed to average reviews from viewers and mixed to negative reviews from critics.

- The Hollywood Reporter's Tim Goodman noted that the actors were saddled in a sitcom world of limited potential, asking "How long can they play this joke?" He concluded that "Isn't it really time to let go of stereotypes and clichés and maybe write a sitcom that has more to joke about than one thing over and over again?"
- JAM! gave the series a "Thumbs Down", noting that "...if you're pining for the next great male sitcom, this isn't it."
- Variety's Brian Lowry noted that "...it'll take more than sociology to pump up this stale sitcom."
- The Oregonian's Kristi Turnquist called the show "Unfunny" in her short review.
- Fantriad's Matt Peterson found that among a mixed gender group of 25- to 34-year-olds, Man Up! ranked among the top 5 of weekly watched television series. The group described the show as, "a fresh take on comedy" and "laugh out loud funny," during online polls and questionnaires. Among other shows listed highly by this group were Last Man Standing and Grimm.
- TV Guide's Matt Roush called the series, "An insult to all genders".

== Ratings ==
The debut episode had a modest start averaging a 2.4/6 among 18-49s, with 7.80 million viewers tuning in. However, it took a hit in its second week, averaging a 2.0/5 among 18-49 with 6.78 million viewers tuning in, a drop of 21% from the first episode. It also found itself among the shows that could become candidates for cancellation according to the TV by the Numbers Renew/Cancel Index based on the show's ratings.

On November 18, 2011, ABC pulled Man Up! from its midseason lineup, despite a statement that it was considered a candidate for a second season pickup. However, TV by the Numbers had the series listed as "de facto canceled" as ABC had not ordered any more episodes, and eleven of the thirteen had already been produced at the time the announcement was made.

On December 8, 2011, ABC pulled Man Up! from the schedule and replaced it with Work It on January 3, 2012, leaving five episodes unaired and effectively cancelling the series altogether. (Work It would fare even worse in the Man Up! time slot, being cancelled after airing just two episodes.) ABC posted the five unaired episodes of Man Up! on the show's website as online exclusive episodes on December 13, 2011; they were removed from the website a month later.

No.	Episode	Air date	18-49 Rating	Viewers (Millions)
1	"Pilot"	October 18, 2011	2.5	7.80
2	"Finessing the Bromance"	October 25, 2011	2.0	6.78
3	"Digging Deeper"	November 1, 2011	1.8	6.36
4	"Wingmen"	November 8, 2011	1.7	6.22
5	"Acceptance"	November 15, 2011	1.7	6.27
6	"High Road Is the Guy Road"	November 22, 2011	1.9	6.29
7	"Disciplining the Keens"	November 29, 2011	1.7	6.59
8	"Men and Their Chickens"	December 6, 2011	1.6	4.82
9	"Camping"	(online-only)	N/A	N/A
10	"Fear"	(online-only)	N/A	N/A
11	"Up All Night"	(online-only)	N/A	N/A
12	"Letting Go"	(online-only)	N/A	N/A
13	"Be Who You're Not"	(online-only)	N/A	N/A

== International broadcast ==
The series was picked up in the following countries:

- In Canada by CTV Two, where it debuted at the same time as the ABC telecast.
- In Australia by Seven Network, starting in 2012.
- In Portugal by FX, starting on February 1, 2012.
- In Norway by TVNorge.
- In Italy by Fox as Cose da uomini (Men's Stuff), starting on April 6 until June 29, 2012.
- In South Korea by FOXlife, starting in May 2012.
- In Thailand by Fox Asia.
- In Israel by HOT3.
- In Turkey by ComedyMax HD.
- In Finland by HeroTV, starting on May 6, 2015.
