= Christopher Moynihan =

American actor, writer and comedian (born 1973)

Christopher Moynihan (born April 1, 1973) is an American actor, writer and comedian. He is the creator and lead actor of the 2011 ABC sitcom Man Up!

== Career ==
Born on Long Island, Moynihan got his first job in the entertainment business in 1997 as an actor in the short-lived series Jenny. He went on to voice acting in Gary & Mike, followed by a role on the television series The Hughleys. Christopher Moynihan went on to a recurring role on According to Jim. He was an actor, writer, and producer for 100 Questions, followed by Man Up!. He is also the creator and producer of Marlon.

== Filmography ==
=== Film ===
Year	Title	Role	Notes
2003	A Mighty Wind	Sean Halloran	
2006	For Your Consideration	Brian Chubb	
2016	Mascots	Phil Mayhew	

=== Television ===
Year	Title	Creator	Writer	Executive producer	Actor	Role	Notes
1998	Jenny	No	No	No	Yes	Deke	1 episode
1999–2001	The Hughleys	No	No	No	Yes	Jimmy	7 episodes
2000	WWE SmackDown	No	No	No	Yes	Gary (voice)	1 episode
2001	Gary & Mike	No	No	No	Yes	Gary Newton (voice)	Main role
2001	The Fighting Fitzgeralds	No	No	No	Yes	Terry	Main role
2001–2003	According to Jim	No	No	No	Yes	Chris	8 episodes
2003	Coupling	No	No	No	Yes	Jeff Clancy	Main role
2010	100 Questions	Yes	Yes	Yes	Yes	Mike Poole	Main role
2011	Man Up!	Yes	Yes	Yes	Yes	Craig Griffith	Main role
2013	Hello Ladies	No	No	No	Yes	Justin	1 episode
2014	Veep	No	No	No	Yes		2 episodes
2017–2018	Marlon	Yes	Yes	Yes	No	—N/a	
2020	Night School	Yes	Yes	Yes	No	—N/a	Unsold NBC pilot
2025–present	Stick	No	Yes	Yes	No	—N/a	
