= Matthew Ashforde =

English actor

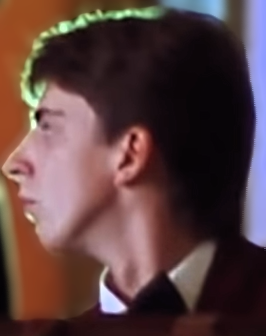
- Ashforde in 1993
- Born: England
- Occupation: Actor
- Years active: 1989–present

Matthew Ashforde is an English actor known for his work on the television series Hetty Feather, Is It Legal?, EastEnders, Grass, Press Gang, and Wonderful You. He has also appeared in episodes of The Bill, Mr. Bean, Casualty, Doctors, and Mayday, among others.

== Selected filmography ==
=== Television ===
List of film appearances, with year, title, and role shown
Year	Title	Role	Notes
1989	Press Gang	Member of news team (uncredited)	6 episodes
1989–2007	The Bill	various	3 episodes
1992	An Ungentlemanly Act	Marine Farnworth	TV movie
1993–95	Mr. Bean	various	3 episodes
1995–98	Is It Legal?	Darren	21 episodes
1996	London Suite	Bellboy	TV movie
1999	Wonderful You	William	6 episodes
1999	The Nearly Complete and Utter History of Everything	Reginald	TV movie
2003	Grass	Darren	7 episodes
2003–17	EastEnders	various	7 episodes
2010–13	Casualty	various	3 episodes
2010–18	Doctors	various	5 episodes
2013	Mayday	PC Bryson	5 episodes
2015–20	Hetty Feather	Cranbourne	29 episodes

=== Film ===
List of film appearances, with year, title, and role shown
Year	Title	Role	Notes
2007	Eight Miles High	Edward	
2007	Lady Godiva: Back in the Saddle	Vincent Dengler	
2010	Chatroom	Jim's father	
2013	One Chance	stage manager	
