= Sue Vertue =

British television producer

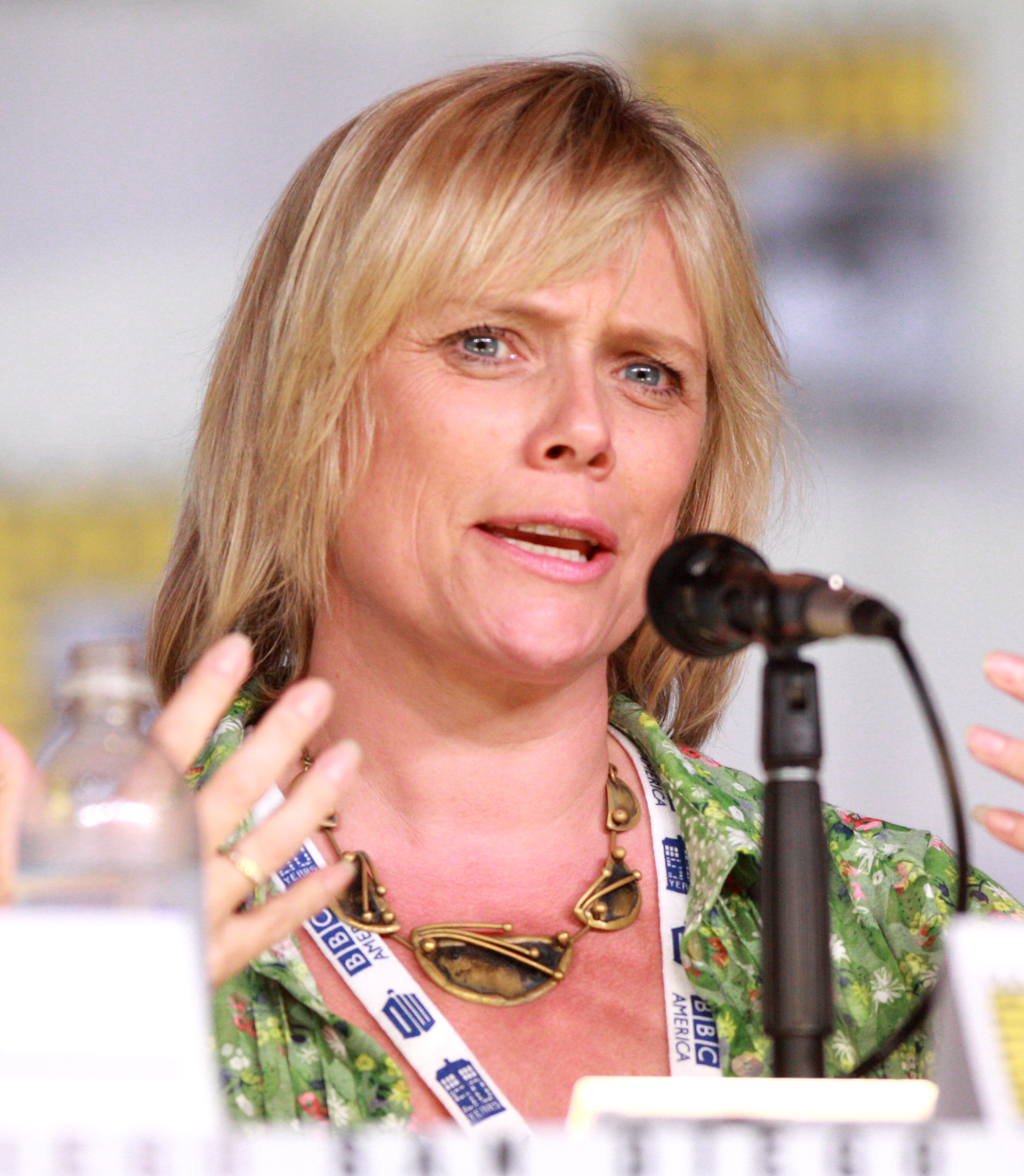
- Vertue in 2013
- Born: Susan Nicola Vertue; 21 September 1960 (age 66); Surrey, England
- Occupation: Television producer
- Spouse: Steven Moffat (m. 1997)
- Children: 2
- Mother: Beryl Vertue

Susan Nicola Vertue (born 21 September 1960) is an English television producer, mainly of comedy shows, including Mr. Bean and Coupling. She is the daughter of producer Beryl Vertue.

Vertue worked for Tiger Aspect, a production company run by Peter Bennett-Jones, where Jones produced episodes of Mr. Bean, The Vicar of Dibley and Gimme Gimme Gimme.

Vertue met writer Steven Moffat at the Edinburgh Television Festival in 1996. A relationship blossomed and they left their respective production companies to join Hartswood Films, run by her mother. When Vertue asked Moffat to write a sitcom for Hartswood, he decided to base it around the evolution of their own relationship. The series became Coupling, which was first broadcast on BBC Two in 2000. The main two characters in the show were even named Steve and Susan, played by Jack Davenport and Sarah Alexander.

In 1999, Vertue produced Doctor Who and the Curse of Fatal Death, a two-episode special of Doctor Who, written by Moffat, for the Red Nose Day charity telethon.

Her other work includes Carrie and Barry, Supernova, Fear, Stress & Anger, The Cup and Sherlock.
