= Hartswood Films =

British television production company

- Company type: Subsidiary
- Industry: Television production
- Founded: 1979; 46 years ago
- Founder: Beryl Vertue
- Key people: Sue Vertue (CEO); Debbie Vertue (director of operations); Dan Cheesbrough (managing director); Steven Moffat (creative director)
- Products: Television programs
- Parent: ITV Studios (2024–present)
- Website: Official website

Hartswood Films is a British television production company founded by Beryl Vertue in 1979. They have also produced dramas such as Jekyll, as well as documentaries, and the 1990s ITV/BBC sitcom Men Behaving Badly.

In 2009, Hartswood opened a production office in Cardiff, which works alongside BBC Cymru Wales' "drama village" in Cardiff Bay. The company's first Cardiff-based production is Sherlock, co-created by Steven Moffat.

In July 2024, ITV Studios acquired a majority stake in Hartswood Films.

== See also ==
- Television series by Hartswood Films
