= List of Sooty & Co. episodes =

Sooty & Co is a British children's television series created and presented by Matthew Corbett and produced by Granada Television. It aired on ITV from 6 September 1993 to 14 December 1998 over six series. The programme follows Matthew Corbett and the puppets Sooty, Sweep, Soo and Little Cousin Scampi as they run a bric-a-brac shop in Manchester.

== Episodes ==
=== Series One (1993) ===
Episode titles, original broadcast dates and synopses for Series One are sourced from British Comedy Guide unless otherwise noted.

No.	Title	Original release date
1	"Moving In"	6 September 1993
Sooty and the gang move into a bric-a-brac shop in Greater Manchester - although the first day results in homesickness, mess with custard pies, water and ink, 2000 empty cardboard boxes, and quite the trip to pick up the shop transport!
2	"Scrap Idea"	13 September 1993
Some say there's real money to be made out of scrap metal—ergo, the idea gets way too deep into the minds of Sooty, Sweep, Soo and Little Cousin Scampi. Note: First appearance of Mo played by Brenda Longman.
3	"Plumbing the Depths"	20 September 1993
Water, water, everywhere, and not a solution to resolve any issues in sight. Especially when the plumbing seems to go out of control when the stopcock gets sheared off... Guest starring Shahid Malik Note: Referred to on home video as 'Splashing Out'.
4	"Comforters"	27 September 1993
Sooty and Sweep end up teasing Soo when they discover her comforter, a "Squaffy" - although as it turns out, everyone else seems to have some sort of secret comforter of their own! Guest Starring Rod, Jane and Freddy Note: Referred to on home video as 'New Friends'.
5	"Buddy Jolly"	4 October 1993
Matthew promised a friend of his that he would look after a possession that's fairly valuable. However, when its seen that the shop's security isn't top-notch, Sweep decided something should be done in the matter...
6	"Staff Training"	11 October 1993
Manners and appropriate methods of communication for the shop staff (particularly the little ones) seems to be an area that is required of serious development. Hence Connie visiting the shop for some staff training at hand. Guest starring Connie Creighton
7	"Bubble Trouble"	18 October 1993
Sweep doesn't seem to have a lot of puff in order to blow up bubbles and balloons to a sufficient height; meanwhile, Sooty proves by technicality that he has a profession in scuba diving.
8	"Canal Capers"	25 October 1993
What was meant as a simple organised weekend on the canal rivers turns out to be nothing more than an unorganised disaster for Captain Organization...
9	"It Pays to Advertise"	1 November 1993
On top of falling for false advertising, Matthew gets the idea to expand the advertising for the shop in order to attract more customers. Though can it be proven to be a success? Note: Referred to on home video as 'Soo to the Rescue'.
10	"Bun Fight"	8 November 1993
In an attempt to purchase some stock into the shop to help with balancing the books, Sooty's realization of what he bought may cause more harm than good.
11	"Sooty and Co.'s World of Fun"	15 November 1993
Despite being eager to visit a theme park, the shop's income wouldn't allow for such. So Sooty and his friends invest in the idea of a theme park of their own - although gaining traction seems to have issues of its own. Note: Referred to on home video simply as 'World of Fun'.
12	"Voice Problems"	22 November 1993
The shop seems to have an invalid present - Matthew, who seems to have fallen ill with a cold, though has since developed into a lost voice. As such Sooty and Scampi help in developing a magic voice box. The results? Quite drastic. Guest starring John Bird (actor) Note: Referred to on home video as 'A Magical Voice'.
13	"Phobias"	29 November 1993
Lots of different phobias result in the idea of hypnotism for Sooty, in an aid to cure their fears. However, once he decides to have some fun, all sorts of shenanigans occur. Note: Referred to on home video as 'Sooty's Magic Solutions'.
14	"Time Gentlemen Please"	6 December 1993
Every clock in the shop seems to have completely malfunctioned, or stopped working entirely, resulting in tons of stress on Matthew's side. Guest starring Shahid Malik Note: Referred to on home video as 'Clocks Galore'.
15	"A Night Out"	13 December 1993
Despite owning the camper van for quite some time, Sooty & Sweep haven't spent a night sleeping in it. As such, Matthew and Soo dare them to complete such a challenge, barring anything that would spark fear. Note: Referred to on home video as 'Camping Out'.

=== Series Two (1994) ===
No.	Title	Original release date
16	"Elastic"	5 September 1994
Sooty's latest trick up his sleeve causes mishap for his friends. Note: Referred to on home video as 'Sooty's Elastic Tricks'.
17	"Dog Tired"	12 September 1994
Attempting to dog sit for the day turns out to be troublesome when Label runs off one time too many. Note: Referred to on home video as 'Dog Trouble'.
18	"Sweep's Little Accidents"	19 September 1994
Not only has Sooty's infamous water pistol gone missing, though Sweep seems to be having some unfortunate mishaps on his own, resulting in self pity when water plays a significant role.
19	"Pony and Trap"	26 September 1994
Even after a lot of persuasion, pleas and cries, Matthew still refuses to let Soo have a real horse or pony of her own. Guest starring Lady Rosamund Fisher
20	"Camelot"	3 October 1994
Chaos, mishaps, too much cola drinking, ice cream and jousting results in quite the chaotic day out at the Camelot Theme Park for Sooty & Co. Guest starring Connie Creighton as herself, CC Smiff as the Jouster and Stuart Loughland as Merlin Note: Referred to on home video as 'Fun Park'.
21	"Post Production"	10 October 1994
Receiving presents from Auntie Maud sounds fun for the little ones, only writing out thank you letters seems to be the real challenge. Note: Referred to on home video as 'The Gift'.
22	"Speedy Sweep"	17 October 1994
Sweep trying to fit in by attempting to be streamlined results in him wanting to drive the camper van. Getting his wish results in more than he bargained for... getting himself arrested for stealing it and on his way to prison. Guest starring Jonathan Dow, Gareth Hunt
23	"Soo's Baby"	24 October 1994
From a toy baby chicken, to kittens, to puppies, to a human baby, and seeing a baby bump, Soo seems eager to want to be a mother of her own. Guest starring Beverly Hills (actress) Note: Referred to on home video as 'Soo's Babies'.
24	"Chaffinch"	31 October 1994
Whilst the gang make products to sell in the shop, Sweep seems to believe that he's made a lot of feathery friends.
25	"Kennels"	7 November 1994
Thanks to a failure to bid the entire stock of the shop off, Matthew decides to open the facility up as a kennel. Although whether the gang can actually look after a dog for a week remains the question.
26	"Home Alone"	14 November 1994
Leaving the shop for the weekend to visit some friends all sounds well, until Sweep himself realises that he's left behind when the rest of the gang leave off without him. Though can being home alone result in some relatively exciting activities? Note: Referred to on home video as 'Home Alone Sweep'.
27	"Rubbish"	21 November 1994
Soo's frustration with other individuals hoarding clutter leads to a challenge to the rest of the gang to see if they can truly make reliable materials from offcuts of wood. Guest starring Gordon Burns Note: Referred to on home video as 'Soo's Spring Cleaning'.
28	"Breakdown"	28 November 1994
Repairing cars seems to be no challenge to Sooty, although when Sweep and Scampi want to get into the action, there seems to be more of a breakdown, rather than a complete repair.
29	"Guests"	5 December 1994
All sorts of confusion, headaches and screaming occurs when Swoop, Swap and Swipe come to stay, thanks to them all being so similar in appearance to their brother who wrote the letters out! Note: Referred to on home video as 'Sweep's Family'.
30	"Rivals"	12 December 1994
Going through the process of making sure enough persuasion to sell products in the shop results in a heated disband between Sweep and Matthew - even going as far as to threaten to open up his own shop to place Sooty & Co. out of business. Guest starring Ken Morley, Brian Murphy (actor) Note: Referred to on home video as 'Shop Keeping'.

=== Series Three (1995) ===
No.	Title	Original release date
31	"Driving Lesson"	4 September 1995
Everything Sweep touches breaks or goes wrong, so Matthew has a plan.... to take him on a driving lesson. Guest starring Derek Deadman
32	"Clowning Around"	11 September 1995
Sooty, Sweep, Soo and Scampi clown around, and Matthew has to join in. Matthew auditions the puppets for the best one at clowning. Matthew gives himself the job and is the target for four child clowns in Mo's clowning lesson.
33	"The Documentary"	18 September 1995
Everyone in the shop is grumpy but when a documentary crew arrives, Matthew has to be nice for the cameras. Matthew also becomes jealous with all the attention Sooty receives. Guest starring Christopher Biggins
34	"The Stain Remover"	25 September 1995
Sooty invents a liquid that removes any stain. But the liquid stops working when Sweep gives the potion a stir with his bone. Guest starring Connie Creighton
35	"Treasure Hunt"	2 October 1995
Matthew orders a mass tidying operation as he can't find a single teaspoon in the whole place, but something he does come across is a mysterious cassette tape with directions to something recorded on it, and "X marks the spot". Is this his ticket to untold riches? Guest starring Larry Dann as Mr Dwayne, the councillor.
36	"Talent Night"	9 October 1995
Guest starring Jim Bowen as talent show host
37	"Races"	23 October 1995
Guest starring Connie Creighton
38	"Can-Can"	30 October 1995
39	"Extinguishers"	6 November 1995
The shop is threatened with closure if it doesn't meet the required safety standards, but thankfully Mo drops by with a heap of fire-fighting equipment for Matthew to buy. Meanwhile, everyone's tied a knot in something as a memory aid, but no-one can remember why, plus Sooty takes a trip around a fire station which then followed by a fire emergency at a familiar place.
40	"Dig This"	13 November 1995
41	"Loadsa Money"	20 November 1995
42	"The Visit"	27 November 1995
43	"Sherlock Sooty"	4 December 1995
Guest starring Tim Whitnall
44	"Recognition Factor"	11 December 1995
Guest starring Jeremy Beadle as himself, Steve Money as Delivery man, Amanda St John as Soo fan and Andrew Clancy as Sooty fan

=== Series Four (1996) ===
No.	Title	Original release date
45	"Water World/New Water"	9 September 1996
Guest starring Larry Dann as Mr Dwayne
46	"Dear Diary"	16 September 1996
47	"Time & Emotion"	23 September 1996
Guest starring Connie Creighton
48	"Shopping/Inheritance"	30 September 1996
49	"Uncle Stuart"	7 October 1996
Guest starring Gordon R Cooper as Uncle Stuart
50	"The Way We Were"	14 October 1996
51	"Buy Buy Everybody"	21 October 1996
Guest starring Paul Merton as Gerald Unimportant
52	"A Pain In Spain"	28 October 1996
Guest starring Antonio Tro Fluxa as a waiter
53	"Dafta Awards"	4 November 1996
Guest starring Lightning (Kim Williams) from Gladiators
54	"Tidy Box"	11 November 1996
Guest starring Paul Zerdin
55	"Matt Alone"	18 November 1996
56	"Squatters"	25 November 1996
57	"Sooty Market Sweep"	2 December 1996
Guest starring Matthew Kelly
58	"Highland Fling"	9 December 1996
Guest starring Tom Cotcher
59	"Sooty's Christmas Panto"	16 December 1996
Guest starring Neil Buchanan, Shane Richie, William Roache

=== Series Five (1997) ===
No.	Title	Original release date
60	"The Great Race"	1 September 1997
Guest starring Tim Whitnall
61	"Surprise Surprise"	8 September 1997
Guest starring Victoria Shearing
62	"Shopshape"	15 September 1997
Guest starring Tom Cotcher
63	"Mr Mastermind"	22 September 1997
64	"Missing You Already"	29 September 1997
Guest starring Bob Kitson
65	"Read All About It"	6 October 1997
Guest starring Steve Money
66	"Snackaravan"	13 October 1997
67	"Luck of the Irish"	20 October 1997
Guest starring Miles Anderson
68	"Think Big"	27 October 1997
Guest starring Frank Bruno, Paul Zerdin & Sam
69	"Councillors"	3 November 1997
Guest starring Connie Creighton
70	"Magic Mayhem"	10 November 1997
71	"Blind Date"	17 November 1997
Guest starring Hilary O'Neil as 'Cilla Black'
72	"Twins"	24 November 1997
Guest starring Deborah and Tessa Vale as nurses
73	"Stars in Their Eyes"	1 December 1997
Guest starring Jack Dee
74	"Sooty And Co's Christmas Special/Fun in the Snow"	8 December 1997
Guest starring Brian Blessed, Tim Bartholomew, Code Red

=== Series Six (1998) ===
Richard Cadell and Liana Bridges both appear together in some episodes.

No.	Title	Original release date
76	"Sherlock Sooty Rides Again"	7 September 1998
77	"Estate Agents"	14 September 1998
Guest starring Harry Hill, Bruce Jones, Georgia Taylor
78	"Health Risk"	21 September 1998
79	"Mouse Loose In The House"	28 September 1998
Guest starring Tim Bartholomew as Professor Oddbod
80	"Now You See Him"	5 October 1998
81	"Birthday Boy"	12 October 1998
82	"Psychic Soo"	19 October 1998
Guest starring Russell Grant
83	"Pulling The Wool"	26 October 1998
Guest starring Windsor Davies
84	"Lie Down With The Dogs"	2 November 1998
85	"What Can The Matter Be?"	9 November 1998
86	"Nature's Way?"	16 November 1998
Guest starring Connie Creighton, her final appearance after appearing in most series of The Sooty Show and Sooty & Co. since 1981.
87	"Come On You Blues"	23 November 1998
Guest starring Kevin Gallacher
88	"Delgrub"	30 November 1998
Guest starring Graham Cole, Final appearance of Mo.
89	"Rocky 1, A Prisoner for Heights"	7 December 1998
Guest starring Windsor Davies
90	"Matt Remembers"	14 December 1998
Guest starring Gerry Marsden, Final appearance of Matthew Corbett at the helm, Final Sooty episode in 4:3 screen.
