= Trevor Hill (producer) =

British television producer (1925–2023)

- Born: Norman Trevor Hill; 28 October 1925; Southampton, Hampshire, England
- Died: 29 October 2023 (aged 98); Stinchcombe, Gloucestershire
- Education: Haberdashers' Aske's Boys' School
- Occupations: BBC radio and television producer
- Years active: 1942–1998
- Known for: It's That Man Again (sound effects); Children's Hour (producer); Round Britain Quiz (producer); Sooty (producer)
- Notable work: Over the Airwaves (2005)

Norman Trevor Hill (28 October 1925 – 29 October 2023) was a British writer, producer and director for the BBC, where his career began in 1942 when he was recruited as a sound effects assistant for It's That Man Again. In 1944 he was responsible for broadcasting General Eisenhower's D-Day announcement of the landing of allied troops on Normandy's beaches. Later, he worked on Children's Hour and the Round Britain Quiz, recruited Harry Corbett and produced Sooty.

Hill retired as assistant head of BBC radio in 1983 but continued working freelance until 1998. His memoir, Over the Airwaves, was published in 2005.

== Early life and education ==
Norman Trevor Hill was born on 28 October 1925 in Southampton, Hampshire. His father worked for H.M. Customs and Excise. The family moved to Highbury, London, and then settled in Mill Hill, northwest London, where Hill became inspired by his neighbour, the actor and comedian Syd Walker. He attended Haberdashers' Aske's Boys' School.

== Early career ==
Hill's career with the BBC began in 1942 when he was recruited as the sound effects assistant for It's That Man Again. He was at the time 16 years old, and hired as youth-in-training. On 6 June 1944, at the age of 18 years, Hill was responsible for broadcasting General Eisenhower's D-Day announcement of the landing of allied troops on Normandy's beaches, having received the recording the day before.

Hill married Sergeant Margaret Potter, whom he met in Hamburg when he was posted there with the British Forces Network. It was there that he also recruited Roger Moore in a minor role in The Adventures of Robin Hood. He later gave him a part in the theatre production of The Shop at Sly Corner. Following the opening performance at the Garrison Theatre, Hill felt unimpressed with Moore's acting ability and advised that he would be better placed modelling sweaters. Both Moore and Hill recalled in later years that during the filming of one of the James Bond movies, Moore relayed a message to Hill stating to "Tell Trevor, I still can't act – but I'm not doing badly".

At the BBC he wrote, produced and directed, and with his wife, produced Children's Hour. Other programmes he produced included Round Britain Quiz, Transatlantic Quiz, and Jackanory.

In 1952 Hill hired Harry Corbett and later produced the show Sooty for several years. According to a letter written by Corbett in 1965, when he suggested introducing the female character Soo, it was Hill, then producer, that dismissed the idea "on the grounds that sex would be creeping in". Hill recalled in his memoirs that Corbett had proposed the idea two years earlier, but he dismissed it stating to Corbett that "Sooty's girlfriend?" "Over my dead body!" According to Corbett's son, his father was eventually called to the BBC head office to be told that Sooty's female friend Soo "was to be allowed – but they must never touch". The media attention received led Hill to document in his memoirs that "I wouldn't have missed a moment of this Sooty Saga – not for the world".

== Later life and death ==
Hill retired from BBC radio in 1983, by which time he was assistant head, and continued working freelance until 1998. In 1998 and 2001, he produced two Second World War feature series for a British and German audience, broadcast by the British Forces Broadcasting Service. In 2014, when residing in Dursley, Gloucestershire, he recounted some of his memories of the BBC. His memoir, Over the Airwaves, was published by Book Guild Publishing in 2005.

Hill died on 29 October 2023, the day after his 98th birthday.

== Bibliography ==
- Hill, Trevor (2005). Over the Airwaves: My Life in Broadcasting. Sussex: The Book Guild. ISBN 1-85776-832-9. OCLC 1245625342.
