= Sooty Heights =

Television series

- Presented by: Richard Cadell; Liana Bridges
- Country of origin: United Kingdom
- Original language: English
- No. of series: 2
- No. of episodes: 26

Production
- Running time: 20 minutes
- Production companies: Sooty Films; Granada Media Children's

Original release
- Network: ITV (CITV)
- Release: 27 September 1999 – 11 December 2000

Related
- Sooty & Co. (1993–1998); Sooty (2001–2004)

Sooty Heights is a British children's television series, created and presented by Richard Cadell, co-stars Liana Bridges and Brenda Longman, produced by Granada Television, and aired on the CITV block of ITV from 27 September 1999 to 11 December 2000. It is the successor to the children's series Sooty & Co and the first programme to feature Cadell as Sooty's right-hand man (and subsequent owner), following the retirement of Matthew Corbett in 1998. The show focuses on Sooty, Sweep, Soo, Scampi, Richard, and Liana running their new home and business place, the Sooty Heights hotel. The programme operated on the same sitcom format first used by The Sooty Show, and retained some elements from the previous show such as Sooty's camper van and the characters' bedroom.

The series ran for two series, with each consisting of 13 episodes. It is the first Sooty series to be transferred to 16:9 widescreen. At its conclusion, Bridges left the programme, while the show was revamped and renamed to Sooty in 2001.

== Cast ==
- Richard Cadell – The programme's main presenter, who maintained many aspects of The Sooty Show and Sooty & Co in Sooty Heights, including the sitcom format, various gags.
- Liana Bridges – Cadell's co-presenter, who also handled the responsibility of narrator alongside Longman.
- Brenda Longman – The voice of Soo on the programme, who also made a physical appearance as the character of Dotty, whom Longman devised to be an eccentric hotel owner who bore no rivalry with the others, and mainly offered help with problems running Sooty Heights.

== Episodes ==
=== Series 1 (1999) ===
No.	Title	Original release date
1	"Desperately Seeking Squeaky"	27 September 1999
Guest Starring: Brenda Longman as Dotty
2	"The Hottest Place in Town"	4 October 1999
Guest Starring: Peter Corey as Mr Coblitt
3	"Water, Water Everywhere"	11 October 1999
4	"The Best of Health"	18 October 1999
Guest Starring: Kriss Akabusi
5	"Hidden Treasure"	25 October 1999
Guest Starring Paul Crone as TV Reporter
6	"Friends and Romans"	1 November 1999
Guest Starring: Robin Parkinson and Marcia Warren as Mr and Mrs Spratley
7	"Battle of the Bands"	8 November 1999
Guest Starring: Cleopatra
8	"The Great Supremo"	15 November 1999
Guest Starring: Stephen Mulhern as The Great Supremo
9	"Jumble"	22 November 1999
Guest Starring: Diana Payan as Auntie Juanita and Robert Duncan as Art Deeler
10	"Fast Food"	29 November 1999
Guest Starring: Glenn Cunningham as Angry Man
11	"Bumps in the Night"	6 December 1999
Guest Starring: Ben Roberts as a policeman, Richard Heap and Stefan Escreet as German guests
12	"Double-O Sooty"	13 December 1999
Guest Starring: Bob Sherman as Hyrem P. Shooter
13	"A Christmas Carrot"	20 December 1999

=== Series 2 (2000) ===
No.	Title	Original release date
1	"To Share is to Care"	18 September 2000
Guest Starring: Matthew Kelly
2	"Guard Dog Wanted"	25 September 2000
3	"Vets and Pets"	2 October 2000
Guest Starring: Eva Gray as Portia du Pont
4	"Manic Organic"	9 October 2000
5	"Undercover Sooty"	16 October 2000
6	"Vote for Soo"	23 October 2000
Guest Starring: Larry Dann as Mr Whalley and Lynn Robertson Bruce as Suds the Robot
7	"Too Many Cooks"	30 October 2000
Guest Starring: Helen Lederer as Mrs Frumpton
8	"A Sense of Business"	6 November 2000
Guest Starring: Tim Whitnall as Mr Cross and Abbi Dupre as Ms Starr
9	"Dog Brain of Britain"	13 November 2000
Guest Starring: Liz Dawn as Liz, Danielle Nicholls as Nesta Table and Steve Money as Security Officer
10	"The Hounds of Music"	20 November 2000
Guest Starring: Philip Delancy as Rolfe
11	"You Must Be Joking"	27 November 2000
Guest Starring: Brian Blessed
12	"The Quest"	4 December 2000
13	"Sooty and the Beanstalk"	11 December 2000
Final episode of Sooty Heights and final appearance of Liana Bridges in all Sooty series.
