= Liana Bridges =

British actress

- Born: Liana Bridges; 25 December 1969 (age 56); Harwich, Essex, England
- Education: The Harwich School, Colchester Institute , Mountview Theatre School
- Occupations: Film, television, actress, Radio
- Years active: 1995–present
- Children: 2

Liana Bridges (born 25 December 1969) is a British actress and presenter. Best known for co-presenting Sooty & Co. with Matthew Corbett and Richard Cadell in 1998, and Sooty Heights with Richard Cadell from 1999 to 2000.

When Sooty Heights ended, her place as co-presenter was taken by Vicki Lee Taylor in the replacement series, Sooty.

She wrote a panto diary for BBC Radio Cambridgeshire from 1 December 2003 to 11 January 2004.

Bridges was appointed artistic director at Kingsway Hall in Dovercourt in December 2007.

Liana co-presented a radio show, the Essex Quest, on BBC Essex every Sunday morning between 10 am and 2 pm. The programme sees Bridges (with Barry Lewis) on the roads of Essex searching for locations based on clues set by the producers at the radio station's headquarters in Chelmsford. Listeners call and message the show in an effort to help the team solve the clues. The final Essex Quest was broadcast on 3 September 2023.

== Personal life ==
Bridges was born in Harwich, Essex and attended Harwich School and later the Colchester Institute, where she gained 3 A levels, and Mountview Academy of Theatre Arts. She is married and has two sons, born in 2004 and 2007.
