= Sooty =

British puppet media franchise

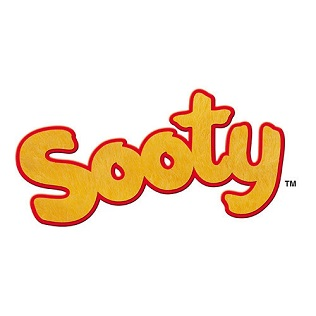
- The current logo of the franchise since 1995
- Created by: Harry Corbett
- Years: 1955 – present

Films and television
- Television series: The Sooty Show (1955–1992); Sooty & Co. (1993–1998); Sooty Heights (1999–2000); Sooty (2001–2004); Sooty (2011–2018)
- Animated series: Sooty's Amazing Adventures (1997–1998)
- Direct-to-video: Learn With Sooty (1989–1991); Sooty's Magic (2000–2002)

Official website
- https://www.thesootyshow.co.uk/

Sooty is a British children's television media franchise created by Harry Corbett incorporating primarily television and stage shows. The franchise originated with his fictional glove puppet character introduced to television in The Sooty Show in 1955. The main character, Sooty, is a mute yellow bear with black ears and nose, who is kind-hearted but also cheeky. Sooty performs magic tricks and practical jokes, and squirts his handler and other people with his water pistol. The franchise itself also includes several other puppet characters who were created for television, as well as an animated series, two spin-off series for the direct-to-video market, and a selection of toy merchandising.

The franchise remained in the ownership of Corbett until his retirement in 1976, before being passed on to his son Matthew. The rights to the franchise were sold in 1996 to a development firm who formed a holding company for the property, with Matthew later retiring and handing over control of the puppet characters to Richard Cadell in 1998. After initial ownership changes from Gullane Entertainment to HIT Entertainment, the franchise suffered some setbacks in 2004, and eventually Cadell bought the rights in June 2008. He has since focused on ensuring the survival of the brand with new stage shows and television programmes.

== Background ==
The present puppet design of Sooty since 2011

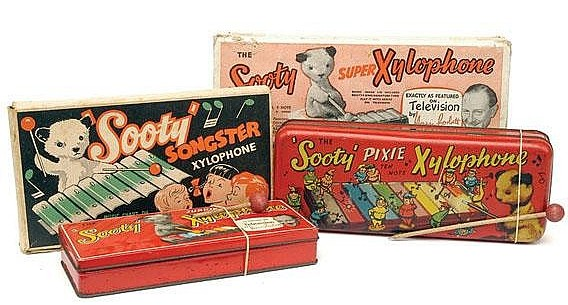
Sooty "xylophones" (which are actually glockenspiels)

The Sooty franchise is focused upon the adventures of Sooty, a glove puppet character created by magician and puppeteer Harry Corbett in the 1950s, alongside his other friends Sweep and Soo. Although mainly appearing in programmes for British children's television, Sooty also incorporates stage shows, both of which make use of a mixture of slapstick comedy, prop comedy – ranging from gunge, custard pies and water pistols – magic tricks, and music. All routines in both are primarily aimed at providing family-friendly entertainment suitable for young children. In addition, the franchise also include merchandising, ranging from annuals to toys. One such product that was sold was a toy musical instrument – referred to as a "xylophone", but in reality a toy glockenspiel – based upon the same instrument used by Sooty up until the 1980s.

=== Creation ===
The creation of the franchise is traced back to 1948, when Corbett came across an all yellow bear glove puppet during a holiday in Blackpool. Purchasing the item for 7s 6d (37.5p), he made use of it to entertain his children during that time, including his newborn son Peter (Matthew), naming the puppet Teddy. In time, his use of the puppet to entertain children with a variety of comedic routines and magic tricks earned him a place on the BBC's talent competition, Talent Night, being held at Belle Vue, Manchester in 1952. Corbett proved popular with viewers and became the overall winner, whereupon he was offered 6 programmes, to be broadcast live on successive Saturdays. However in those days Saturday was a normal working day and when his employer refused to give him time off his job as an engineer he took the risk and resigned, becoming a regular performer on the BBC children's show Saturday Special, where his puppet immediately appealed to children, turning him into an overnight success. Corbett opted to redesign Teddy's appearance to make him stand out on black and white television screens. The overall change involved the use of black dust (or 'soot') upon the ears and nose, which inspired Corbett to change the puppet's name from Teddy to Sooty. The new look cemented the foundations of the franchise.

=== Characters ===
The franchise features three different characters, with the most prominent being the titular character himself – Sooty. Corbett's design for the character was that all his puppets were yellow bears who bore the distinct features of black ears and nose. When portrayed in performances on television and stage shows, the character was cheeky and naughty, fond of playing practical jokes, but was also kind-hearted and good. Part of the character's design that Corbett devised, was for Sooty being mute in his appearances and thus communicating with others by 'whispering' in their ear, to which the recipient often repeats what was said for the audience to understand. The character often retains two items that are iconic in his appearance: a magic wand, which he uses for spells conducted to the catchphrase of "Izzy wizzy, let's get busy!" – which Corbett devised – and tapping it to "Shave and a Haircut"; and a water pistol, which symbolises his cheekiness by often being used to soak others around him – including on programmes he is a guest on, such as soaking talk show hosts. On television programmes, the presenter – Sooty's owner and main puppeteer – often acts as narrator for scenes involving the character and other puppets, thus providing a 'voice' for Sooty during their narration to portray the character speaking normally with other puppet characters.

The other two characters in the franchise were created to accompany Sooty in performances, effectively forming the backbone of television and stage shows, and were created by Corbett. The first character, Sweep, introduced in 1957, was designed to be a dog and friend of Sooty, who would be portrayed as being dim-witted but good-natured and innocent, who would often make mistakes that would cause problems for others, often get his own back on others when tricked, and have an obsession with bones. An aspect of the character's design was his voice – in performances he would speak in a high-pitched squeak that would have some form of sentences, but would often be translated by the main puppeteer for the audience to understand more clearly. The concept was created by Corbett's brother Leslie through the use of a saxophone reed, and became a permanent element of the character upon his debut. The second character, Soo, introduced in 1964, was designed as a panda bear, who would be portrayed as sweet, shy, and mainly responsible, acting as a motherly character to the other two. In later years, the character tends to sometimes hate being tricked by the others, but does not mind enjoying a laugh when someone else is being tricked. Unlike the other two, Soo was designed to have a voice, in order to provide ease in production of television episodes.

== Television history ==
=== Harry Corbett era ===
Sweep made his debut in 1957 and has remained a part of the franchise.

After his initial performances with his puppet between 1952 and 1955, Harry Corbett introduced Sooty officially with his own programme, Sooty, the title was changed to The Sooty Show in 1967. The programme, run on BBC TV (later BBC1) between 1955 and 1967 and made as a replacement for Muffin the Mule, included a series of comedic sketches involving Sooty conducting simple tasks or ventures, which would sometimes go wrong and result in a mess that they would need to deal with. The show expanded on the routines used in episodes by featuring slapstick humour suitable for young children, magic tricks, and the inclusion of songs and music. The glove puppet gained a sufficient profile from television exposure that his likeness became a feature on charity collection boxes used by the Royal National Institute of Blind People in the late 1950s.

Corbett expanded on the programme further with the inclusion of story-telling, and the creation of additional characters that would co-star with Sooty. The two most prominent additions were made during his tenure with the BBC: Sweep in 1957, handled by his brother Leslie Corbett, and Soo in 1964, voiced by his wife Marjorie and brought in after backlash on the BBC's desire not to include a female character. In 1967, Corbett fell into disagreement with the BBC, in particular with the new controller of BBC1 that year, Paul Fox, who decided that Corbett be replaced with another person presenting his programme. Faced with the prospect of this or his programme being cancelled, Corbett decided to sign a deal with ITV to bring Sooty to commercial television, having earlier performed with the character in one of the channel's first product advertisements. The newly established franchise Thames Television would make the programme. The move led to him expanding on the characters that featured in the programme, including: Butch, another dog who occasionally plays the part of a villain; Ramsbottom, a snake; and 'Enry the Robot, a robot with light up eyes who keeps breaking down.

Alongside his television work, Corbett also created travelling shows with Sooty and various works for charity, but the switch to ITV created a tighter schedule that increased his workload. As a result, Corbett's work affected his health badly, culminating in him having a heart attack in December 1975. Knowing he would need to retire, Corbett opted to hand over control of his puppets and the franchise to his son Peter, who was now performing in children's television under the stage name of Matthew Corbett, with his own programme. Corbett's role in children's television earned him an OBE for his services in January 1976, with his character Sooty being given a special one alongside him during his ceremony. He continued to provide assistance on The Sooty Show as a guest star, making his final appearance in 1984 – five years before his death in 1989.

=== Matthew Corbett era ===
Following his father's retirement, Matthew Corbett took sole responsibility for the puppets on The Sooty Show, although he was forced to forgo his own programme as a direct result. Matthew maintained the programme's format until 1981 before making changes. These included discontinuing the use of an audience and comedic sketches, dropping a number of puppet characters – leaving only Sooty, Sweep and Soo as the main stars – and switching the show to a sitcom format, set within a suburban home, in which Matthew and the puppets faced a misadventure in each episode. Elements such as slapstick comedy, comedic messes, practical jokes, music and guests remained a part of the programme under the new format. Alongside the transformation of The Sooty Show, Matthew branched out into stage shows featuring Sooty, bringing him closer to his audiences.

Production on the new format of the television programme was aided by Connie Creighton, who had worked alongside Matthew's father and was given a co-star role on several episodes, while following his mother's retirement from her role, the voice of Soo was cast to Brenda Longman; Sweep's handler was also replaced, with Brian Sanford replacing Matthew's brother. Episodes of the programme mostly were aimed at comedic value, but elements of education were included in some stories; a spin-off educational series generated for pre-school audiences, titled Learn With Sooty, was later released between 1989 and 1991 on home video, but never shown on television. Although Matthew had dropped several characters from the show's old format, some returned in a guest capacity, while a new one was introduced in 1990 called Little Cousin Scampi – a character that Matthew devised as being part of Sooty's family, and who communicated in the same manner as Sooty.

The Sooty Show came to its conclusion in 1992 when Thames Television lost its franchise, whereupon Matthew created a sequel for ITV that launched in 1993 under the title of Sooty & Co.. The new programme, produced by Granada Television, operated under the same format as its predecessor, but with episodes set mainly within a bric-a-brac shop in Manchester. While Creighton remained a part of the programme for a number of series, Longman was given a physical role as co-star in several episodes, mainly as a regular customer named Mo, alongside her role as Soo's voice actor, with the programme featuring several stories that ventured out into new locations. Matthew continued to conduct further stage shows, and also entered himself and Sooty as guests on other programmes.

In 1996, Matthew sold the rights to the Sooty brand to the Global Rights Development Fund (a subsidiary of the Bank of Yokohama) for £1.4 million, creating Sooty International Limited whose intentions would be to bring Sooty to "true international stardom", but leaving Matthew to be the frontman for the franchise. In 1997, Matthew devised an animated spin-off, titled Sooty's Amazing Adventures, which ran between 1997–98 and featured a different style of adventures to the live-action show, including voices for Scampi and Sweep, and a different voice actor for Soo. The spin-off lasted two series, before Matthew concluded it in preparation for his retirement in December 1998, following the finale of Sooty & Co.

=== Richard Cadell era ===
Soo (left) made her debut in 1964 and has remained a part of the franchise since her first appearance.

Following his retirement, Matthew Corbett bequeathed his puppets to Richard Cadell, a fan of Sooty and a skilled magician, who produced a new Sooty programme for ITV titled Sooty Heights, which launched in 1999. Like its predecessor, the new programme stuck to the same format, but with episodes set within a beachside hotel that the characters ran, with Cadell joined by Liana Bridges – a co-star whom he worked with on a number of episodes in the final series of Sooty & Co. By the end of 1999, The Britt Allcroft Company, owners of Thomas the Tank Engine & Friends, had purchased a 50% stake in the franchise from Sooty International Limited, and created a joint-venture company called Bridgefilms (Also known as Sooty Limited), which would also handle distribution rights to existing Britt Allcroft property Magic Adventures of Mumfie. The Britt Allcroft Company was rebranded as Gullane Entertainment in 2000.

While Cadell continued to operate stage shows and produce a second spin-off series, titled Sooty's Magic, for the direct-to-video market, Sooty Heights was changed by Gullane Entertainment in 2001. As well as being renamed as Sooty, it also saw Bridges being replaced with Vicki Lee Taylor, the presentation style of the programme being changed, including the stage sets, and the addition of two new puppet characters to the cast: the return of Butch; and the introduction of a new character called Miki – a Brazilian cat.

In July 2002, Gullane Entertainment accepted a deal to be acquired by fellow children's company HIT Entertainment, the owners of franchises such as Bob the Builder and Barney. Following the purchase, the then-current TV series went under severe budget cuts, which included new puppet designs for the characters and effectively saw several puppeteers, including Longman, leaving the programme. HIT continued to struggle with the franchise from this point forward, seeing it as having little "international appeal" and attempted to put their stake in the Sooty Limited joint-venture with ProVen Private Equity up for sale in December 2002, with Entertainment Rights as an interested purchaser. However, nothing came forward of these plans and eventually the then-current series was cancelled by ITV in 2004. By 2005, HIT had been sold to Apax Partners and was in heavy debt. The company was unable to offer ITV a new series in 2006 and in October 2007 the company officially announced that they had put the Sooty Limited/Bridgefilms subsidiary up for sale.

In June 2008, Cadell bought the rights from HIT, with the intention of saving the franchise and ensuring its future. Alongside conducting new stage shows, he also began work on producing a new programme, which eventually launched on CITV in 2011 under the title of Sooty. Although the format remained the same, the setting changed to misadventures within a holiday park that they helped to run, while scripts were aimed at younger audiences. Filming of the series took place at Brean Leisure Park, which Cadell co-owned with his brother, until it was put up for sale in 2014. Additional series were still made, but focused on other locations, with the programme moving to ITVBe. Cadell continued to keep Sooty in the public eye, making guest appearances with him, and at times the other characters, on other programmes. In 2017, Sooty was officially inducted into The Magic Circle based upon the magic tricks he conducted with his handlers.

After the expiry of the licence at Brean, Cadells Limited announced in February 2022 to sign a new deal with Crealy Theme Park & Resort to open a Sooty-focused theme park area in May 2022.

== Stage show history ==
=== 1984 – 1998 ===
During Matthew Corbett's reign, seven stage shows were performed repetitively. For the first half of the tours, Matthew and Connie Creighton would present, and during the second half, while Matthew was busy writing and filming the TV shows, Connie and Spencer K. Gibbens would present.

- Sooty's Creepy Castle (1984/1985 – 1991/1992)
- Sooty's Picnic (1985/1986 – 1992/1993)
- Sooty's World Cruise (1986/1987 – 1993/1994)
- Sooty's Wild West Show (1987/1988 – 1994/1995)
- Sooty in Space (1988/1989 – 1995/1996)
- Sooty's Circus (1989/1990 – 1996/1997)
- The House That Sooty Built (1990/1991 – 1997/1998)

=== 1998 – 2004 ===
After Matthew retired, six stage shows toured the country. All starred Richard Cadell; three of them also featured Richard's Sooty Heights co-star, Liana Bridges, with the fourth starring Amanda Howard in Liana's place.

- Sooty's Magical Mystery Tour (1998/1999)
- Sooty's Treasure Hunt (1999/2000)
- Sooty's Magic Farm (2000/2001)
- The Magic and Mayhem Tour (2001/2002)
- The Izzy Wizzy Tour (2002/2003)
- The Comedy and Chaos Tour (2003/2004)

=== 2005 – 2008 ===
From 2005 to 2008, annual shows, featuring the puppet characters and various different presenters, toured around the UK.

- The Wet and Wild Show (2005)
- The Izzy Wizzy Holiday Show (2006)
- Sooty's Magic Castle (2007)
- Sooty's Magic Wand Factory (2008)

=== 2009 onwards ===
From 2009, stage shows again featured Richard Cadell. The first, Sooty in Space, was a reworking of one of Matthew Corbett's scripts, and toured the country throughout the year.

- Sooty in Space (2009)
- The Sooty Christmas Show (2011) – Garrick Theatre, London, and 2016–7 at Hyde Park Winter Wonderland.
- The Sooty Show (2012) – Butlins at Bognor Regis, Minehead and Skegness
- Sooty in Space (2012) – Duchess Theatre, London
- The Sooty Show (2014/15)
- Wizard of Oz (2016) – Easter tour
- The Sooty Show (2017)
- Sooty’s Magic Show (2019 – 2022)

== Film ==
On 20 June 2014 the Radio Times confirmed that Sooty: The Movie was in production. It was set to go in production in 2016.

Wink Taylor, Alex Skerratt and Richard Cadell were writing the film. Cadell confirmed that Matthew Corbett would appear in the movie. In 2021 Sooty and The Trifle of Doom was announced to be distributed by Kaleidoscope Film Distribution.

== Merchandise ==
=== Books ===
For most years from 1957 to 1998, there was a Sooty Annual; no annual was published in 1987, 1988, or 1990. The early annuals were published by the London Daily Mirror. Later annuals were published by Purnell and Sons.

The annuals feature an expanded cast of characters including:

- Sooty, who is shown as white not yellow and wears red trousers.
- Sweep, also white not grey, who walks on all fours like a normal dog, but can stand as a biped to play the bugle and so on.
- Cokey the Clown, another close friend of Sooty's.
- Mr Fusspot, Mayor of TV Town where the action takes place.
- PC Nab, one of the police of TV Town.
- Calico Joe, a fully clothed cat who smokes, always stands erect as a biped, and is a con man.

=== Discography ===
In 1956, Philips Records released a 78 r.p.m. record P.B.528. It contains (side 1) "Sooty" (by Corbett) performed by Marie Benson and also featuring Harry Corbett and Sooty with instrumental accompaniment, and (side 2) "Mr Dumpling" (by Heathcote) performed by Marie Benson with instrumental accompaniment.

In 1961 an album "Sooty Entertains" was released. It contains Sooty's Concert, Sooty The Chef, Danger - Animals At Work, Sooty's Theatre, Double-Cross Quiz, The Music Lesson, Sooty's Music Festival & Sooty's Photographic Studio. All were also released as four singles. Two more singles were released with titles Sooty's Party Part One & Part Two, and Bedtime With Sooty and Sooty At The Organ. In 1965 an E.P. was released "Sooty & His T.V. Friends" featuring Sooty's Signature Tune, Soo, Sweep & Harry. In 1973 a single and album were released. The single was "Super Sonic Sooty Spug" with "My Friend and I" on the B-side. The album was Around the World with Sooty...Harry Corbett and Sweep. This comprised eight songs with a linking story. The songs included both the A and B-sides of the single. These were released on the Music for Pleasure label.

== Guest appearances ==
- Sooty and Sweep had appeared on a Rubber News sketch with Alastair Burnet on a Series 2 episode of Spitting Image.
- The Sooty Show had a number of celebrities from all walks of life making appearances on the show, including Iron Maiden drummer Nicko McBrain who is a self-confessed Sooty fan and always has the puppet as a mascot on the front of his drumkit, and has occasionally donned a full size Sooty costume at shows as an entrance.
- Sooty and Sweep had appeared as the Prime Minister and Home Secretary, respectively of the Puppet Government in The Goodies episode "The Goodies Rule – O.K.?". Soo and Kipper the Cat also made cameo appearances.
- A number of famous faces made cameo appearances – usually as themselves – in Sooty and Co, including Gareth Hunt, Matthew Kelly, William Roache, Jack Dee, Paul Merton, Shane Richie, Frank Bruno, Jim Bowen, Rod, Jane and Freddy, Harry Hill, Barbie Wilde and Brian Blessed.
- Sooty and Matthew Corbett had appeared on a Christmas episode of They Think It's All Over, attacking Nick Hancock with Sooty's water pistol after Hancock ruled against them in one game. Hancock exacted revenge by emptying a bottle of water over Corbett's head.
- Sooty and Matthew Corbett appeared on a Christmas edition of Noel Edmonds' comedy show Telly Addicts in 1993 when they put questions to the team which consisted of Craig Charles, Philippa Forrester, Diane Bull and Gary Olsen.
- Bobby Davro hosted a Sooty parody sketch called "Sooty in Soho" on his sketch show in 1989, which saw him doing an impression of Matthew and depicting Sooty and Sweep owning a brothel. The sketch was interrupted by the real Matthew Corbett showing up and assuring the audience that the Sooty which Davro had was an imposter. He then produced the real Sooty, who promptly squirted both Davro and Matthew with his water pistol.
- Sooty and Matthew Corbett appeared in crossover episodes of Thames Television's other mainstay of children's programming, Rainbow. The first episode of The Sooty Show from 1977 had guest appearances from the Rainbow gang. Another appearance was in the 1000th Birthday Party episode in 1986 and finally the episode, "The VIP", which aired in 1990 and saw them performing a magic show for Zippy, George, Bungle and Geoffrey.
- Sooty also appeared in the video for "Is This the Way to Amarillo" 2005 remake mimed by Peter Kay. Sooty and his co star Sweep appeared on the shoulders of Peter Kay as he ran down a corridor.
- Sooty and Sweep appeared alongside Richard Cadell in June 2008, for a special 90th Birthday message for Nelson Mandela.
- Sweep made his first appearance on Channel 4 as himself in the eighth episode of the second series of The Harry Hill Show.
- Sooty, along with Sweep & Soo made an appearance in the music video for "The Official BBC Children in Need Medley" with the 'All-Star Animated Band' produced by Peter Kay in November 2009.
- Sooty and Sweep appeared as surprise guests on The Chris Moyles Show in his "Birthday Show" for BBC Radio 1 on 18 February 2011.
- Sooty, Sweep and Soo were the guest judges on the fifth episode of the second series of The Matt Lucas Awards, a TV programme originally shown on BBC One on Tuesday, 9 April 2013.
- Sooty and Sweep made guest appearances on a special variety show ('We Are Most Amused and Amazed') in November 2018. The show was recorded live at the London Palladium (and later shown on prime-time ITV) in honour of the 70th birthday of the Prince of Wales in his presence and that of the Duchess of Cornwall. Sooty was introduced from the main stage by Jim Carter – the actor who plays the butler Carson in Downton Abbey.
- In 2013, UK Voiceover artist Peter Dickson gave Sooty a voice on a famous episode of The Sooty Show on TV, after remaining silent since 1948.
- Richard Cadell and Sooty appeared on the BBC gameshow, Pointless Celebrities, in 2017, where they read out a selection of questions on children's television, including, "Which member of the Royal Family did Sooty squirt in 1955?" (Prince Philip). After this, Sooty squirted the host, Alexander Armstrong, with his water pistol.

== See also ==
- Trevor Hill
