= Child Okeford =

Village in Dorset, England

Coordinates: 50.913°N 2.237°W

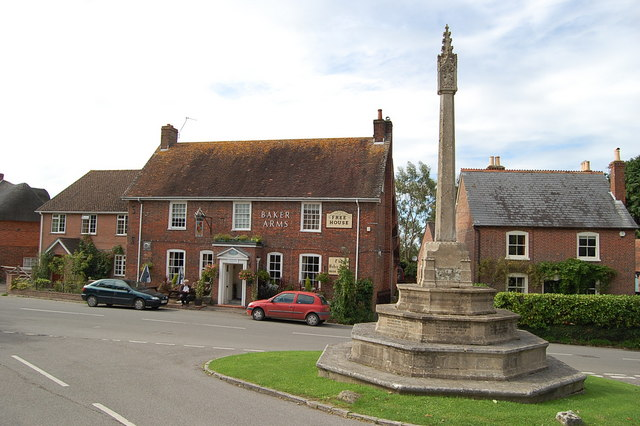
- Child Okeford village centre

- Location within Dorset
- Population: 825 (1971)
- OS grid reference: ST834127
- Civil parish: Child Okeford
- Unitary authority: Dorset
- Ceremonial county: Dorset
- Region: South West
- Country: England
- Sovereign state: United Kingdom
- Post town: BLANDFORD FORUM
- Postcode district: DT11
- Dialling code: 01258
- Police: Dorset
- Fire: Dorset and Wiltshire
- Ambulance: South Western
- UK Parliament: North Dorset
- Website: Village community website

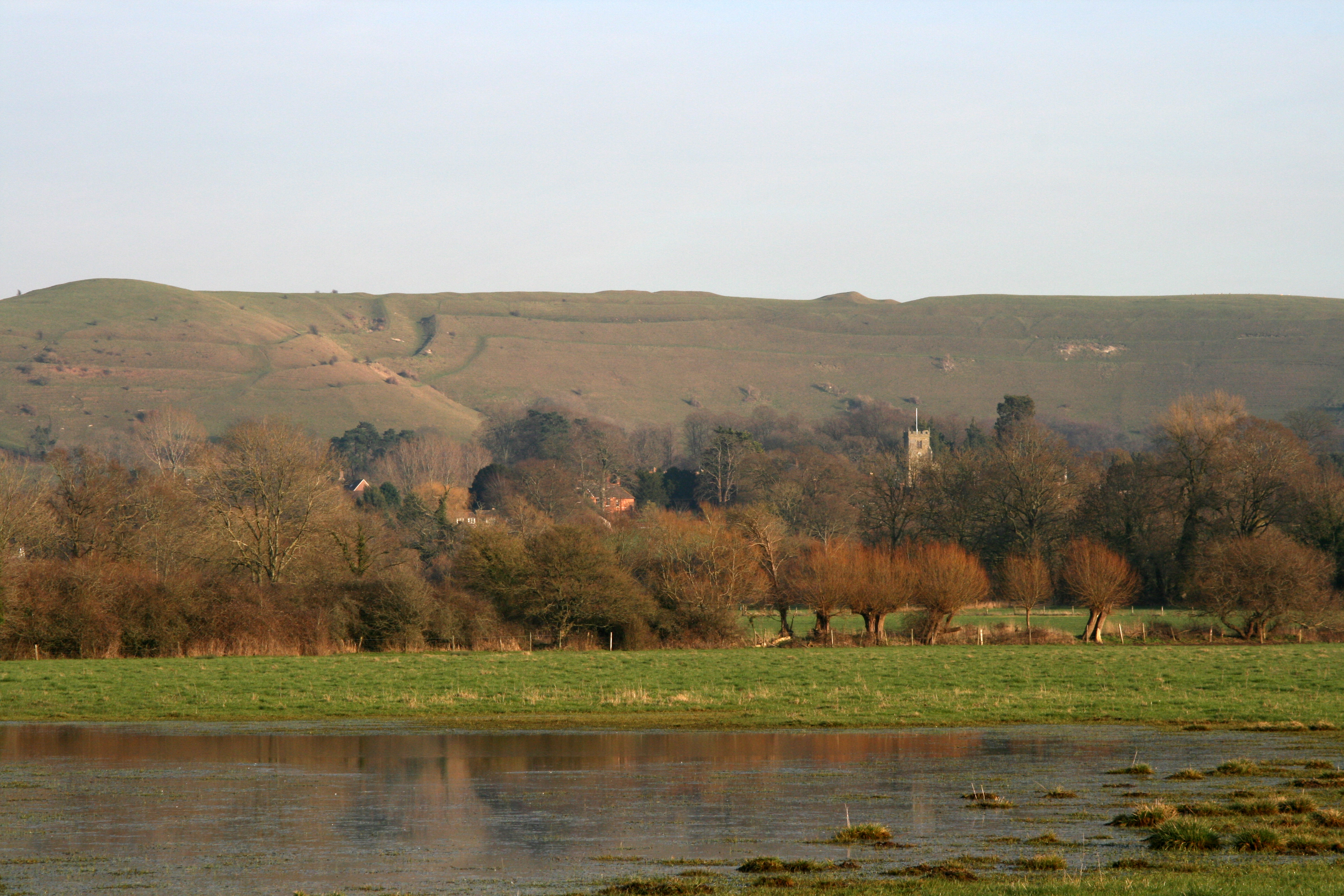
Child Okeford village and Hambledon Hill viewed from water meadows by the River Stour

Child Okeford (sometimes written Childe Okeford) is a village and civil parish in the county of Dorset in southern England, 3 miles (5 kilometres) east of the small town of Sturminster Newton. Child Okeford lies downstream from Sturminster, along the River Stour, which passes half a mile west of the village. In the 2021 census the civil parish had a population of 1,170.

== History ==
On Hambledon Hill to the east of the village are a Neolithic ceremonial burial site and an Iron Age hill fort. The latter has multiple ramparts enclosing 31 acres (13 hectares) and is rich in occupation remains. It occupies the entire northern spur of the hill above 140 metres (460 feet) and has been described as "one of the most impressive earthworks in southern England".

In the Domesday Book of 1086 Child Okeford was recorded as Acford and appeared in two entries. It had 39 households and a total taxable value of 10 geld units. By 1212 the village was known as Chiltacford. The earlier name means simply "ford of the oak tree". The later prefix Child may derive either from Old English cielde, meaning "spring", or from cilda, the genitive plural of cild ("young nobleman"), in which case the meaning would be "Okeford of the young noblemen".

In 1645 Hambledon Hill was the site of a battle in the English Civil War; a group of locals, who were antagonistic to the war and called themselves "the Clubmen", attacked both Royalist and Parliamentarian forces and petitioned them to end the war. Under the leadership of the rector of nearby Compton Abbas, 2,000 of them assembled on the hill and defied Oliver Cromwell's requests to lay down their arms. Cromwell sent in troops and defeated them, then locked up 300 prisoners in the church at Iwerne Courtney and extracted promises of good behaviour. Cromwell wrote of them as being "poor silly creatures" who "promise to be very dutiful for time to come". A century later General James Wolfe used the hill's steeper sides to prepare his troops; they later surprised the French at Quebec by scaling the Plains of Abraham under cover of darkness.

A World War I war memorial in the form of a stone cross stands at the road junction known in the village as The Cross.

The Somerset and Dorset Joint Railway ran to the west of the village through neighbouring Shillingstone railway station, until the line closed in 1966.

== Geography ==
Child Okeford parish covers 1,570 acres (640 hectares) at an elevation of about 40 to 190 metres (130 to 620 feet), though the major part is below about 90 metres (300 feet). The underlying geology is Kimmeridge clay, upper and lower greensand, gault, some chalk in the east and river gravels by the River Stour.

== Demography ==
Census population of Child Okeford parish
Census	Population	Households
1921	651	
1931	605	
1951	637	
1961	667	
1971	830	
1981	930	
1991	980	
2001	1,060	482
2011	1,114	503
2021	1,170	547

== Governance ==
Child Okeford is in the Dorset unitary authority area. For elections to Dorset Council it is in the Hill Forts and Upper Tarrants electoral ward. The parish was previously part of Sturminster Rural District from 1894 to 1974, and then part of North Dorset district from 1974 until the creation of the unitary Dorset district in 2019.

== Amenities ==
Child Okeford has a village hall, community centre, playing field (including a football pitch and cricket pitch), doctor's surgery, post office and general store, Church of England primary school, and a nursery or educational support centre for children age 0–11 years.

== Notable residents ==
In 1561 William Kethe was appointed vicar of the parish. He remained in the village until his death in 1594. Kethe wrote the hymns O worship the King, all glorious above and All people that on earth do dwell, the latter adapted from Psalm 100 and set to the tune of The Old Hundredth. Other well known people who live or lived in the village include: the composer Sir John Tavener, who lived in the village until his death in 2013; TV presenter Harry Corbett, originator of Sooty and Sweep, who lived here until his death in 1989; TV presenter Mick Robertson, known for Magpie; and politician David James, who lived in the village whilst Conservative MP for North Dorset.

== Gallery ==
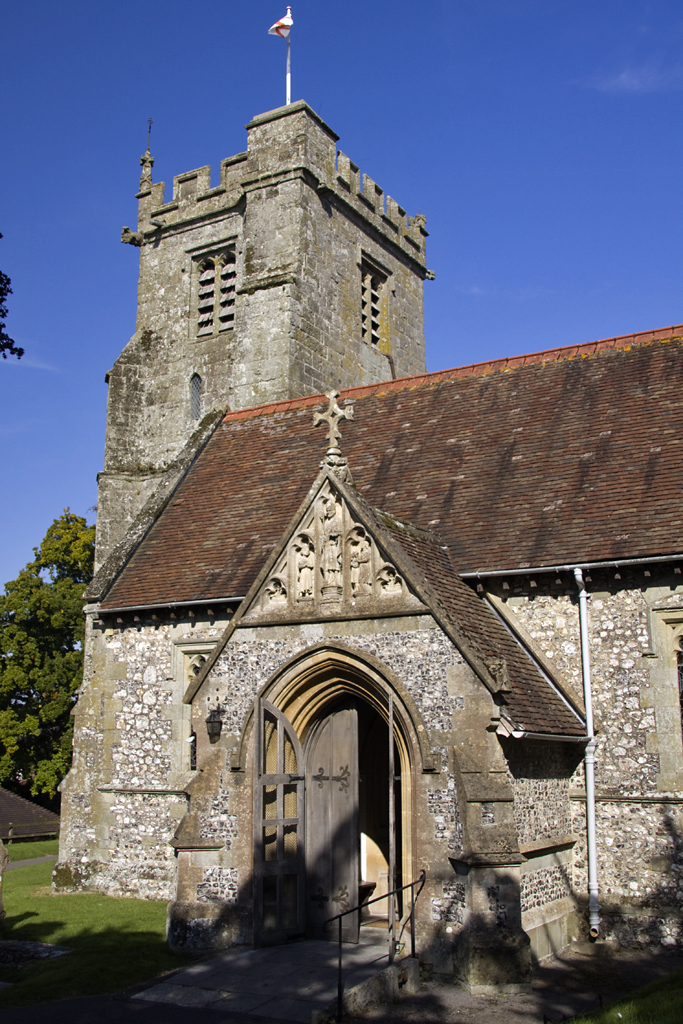
St Nicholas Church

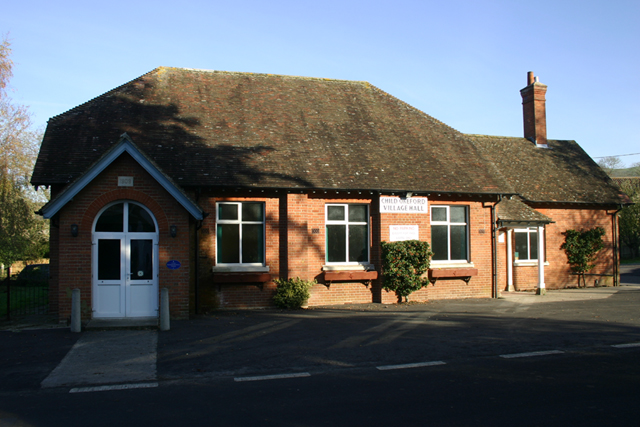
Child Okeford Village Hall

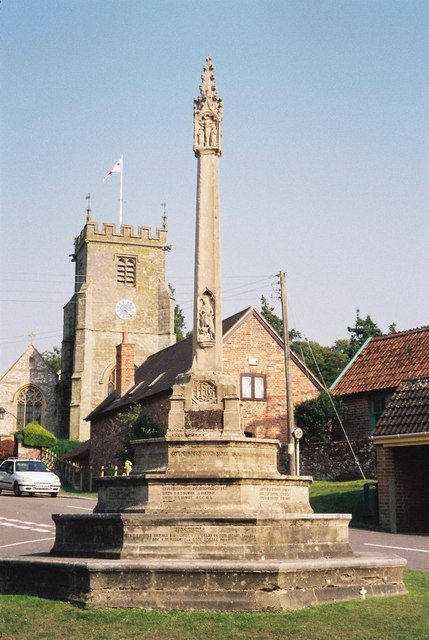
Child Okeford: cross

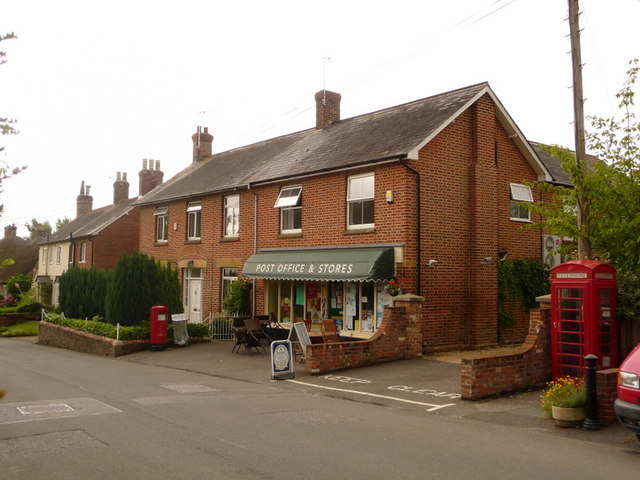
Child Okeford: the post office

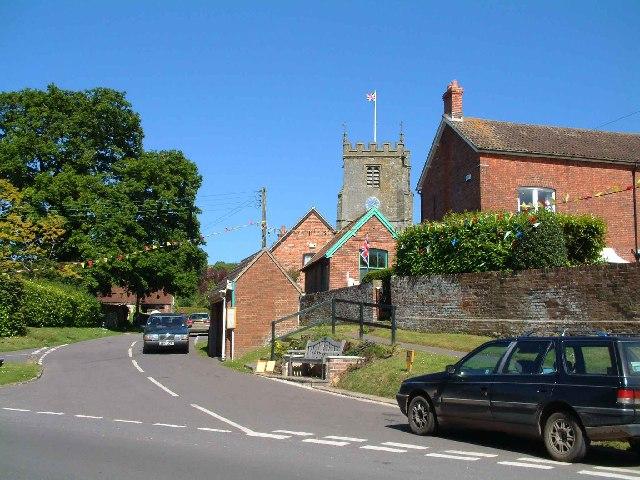
Village centre
