= Learn With Sooty =

- Opening theme (from Have Fun With Numbers)
- Starring: Matthew Corbett; Brenda Longman (the voice of Soo)
- Country of origin: United Kingdom

Production
- Running time: 50–60 minutes
- Production company: Thames Video Collection

Original release
- Network: ITV (Children's ITV)
- Release: 5 June 1989 – 4 February 1991

Learn with Sooty! is a series of educational videos produced from 1989 to 1991, based on the British children's television series The Sooty Show. It features the glove puppet characters Sooty, Sweep and Soo, and follows them in their many mischievous adventures. Learn with Sooty! is presented by Matthew Corbett.

== Characters ==
- Sooty - A mute yellow bear who is the protagonist of the show. He owns a magic wand whose power is invoked using the words "Izzy wizzy, let's get busy!".
- Sweep - A grey dog with a penchant for bones and sausages. He communicates using bizarre squeaks.
- Soo - A calm and collected female panda who acts as the foil for both Sooty and Sweep. Voiced by Brenda Longman.

== UK VHS releases ==
VHS title	Release date	Synopsis
Learn with Sooty! - Be Safe! (TV8064)	5 June 1989	Everyone learns all about common dangers.
Learn with Sooty! - Start to Read! (TV8065)	5 June 1989	Sweep does not know how to read, so Matthew attempts to do ways to make him read.
Learn with Sooty! - Have Fun with Numbers (TV8066)	5 June 1989	Sweep does not know how to count, so everyone does some counting.
Learn with Sooty! - Simple Science! (Later released as How things Work) (TV8067)	5 June 1989	The gang are making science experiments that are very simple.
Learn with Sooty! - A-Z of Animals! (TV8108)	10 September 1990	Matthew, Sooty, Sweep, and Soo go through every letter of the alphabet of animals, by using Sooty's Magic transporter.
Learn with Sooty! - Start to Read! 2 (TV8107)	10 September 1990	After watching the first Start to Read a lot, the gang make stories, write thank you cards and more.
Learn with Sooty! - Down on the Farm (TV8130)	4 February 1991	Matthew and Sooty visit Thorpe Farm and learn many interesting facts about various farm animals, while Sweep and Soo learn about farm animals at home through songs, nursery rhymes and words in this educational video.
Learn with Sooty! - Have Fun with Numbers! 2 (Also known as Multiplication and Time Tables) (TV8131)	4 February 1991	Matthew teaches Sooty, Sweep and Soo and they learn the times tables by using different coloured blocks and beads and through singing the "Times Tables" song. Also, they do something on the blackboard, and learn with the kids of Frogmore County Infant School.

== See also ==
- Video Collection International
