= Sooty's Amazing Adventures =

- Genre: Fantasy; Animation; Children's
- Created by: Matthew Corbett
- Developed by: Meridian Broadcasting
- Written by: Roger Stennett; Jimmy Hibbert; Malcolm McGookin
- Directed by: Jon Doyle
- Starring: Susie Blake; Jimmy Hibbert; Rob Rackstraw
- Composer: Dave Corbett
- Country of origin: United Kingdom
- Original language: English
- No. of series: 2
- No. of episodes: 26 (2 missing, 1 incomplete)

Production
- Running time: 10 minutes per episode (approx.)
- Production company: Cosgrove Hall Films

Original release
- Network: ITV (Children's ITV)
- Release: 6 January 1997 – 30 March 1998

Sooty's Amazing Adventures is a British animated spin off series of the Sooty franchise which aired from 6 January 1997 to 30 March 1998. In this incarnation, he is a fully bodied bear free from the puppeteer's hand.

== Setting and location ==
The gang live in the Fanshawe Theatre in an unknown English coastal town. The four embark on their adventures through a trapdoor located on the theatre's main stage which would take them to various places and times. However more often than not the trapdoor fails to send them to their desired location.

== Main characters ==
Sooty - A quiet and smart bear who is the undisputed leader of the gang. Sooty is the only character in the show that does not talk (yet sometimes makes a rattling noise when he either nods or shakes his head) and, being a mute bear, finds communication difficult but still often gets what he is trying to say across to the rest of the cast. He usually saves his friends with his trusty magic wand, which he is only permitted to use once per adventure. He wears a pair of bright red dungarees with two white buttons.

Sweep (voiced by Rob Rackstraw) - Now being able to speak with a rather groany sort of voice rather than the 'squeak' he is so well known for. Sweep is not the brainiest of the bunch and often thinks of nothing else than food which often involves 'sausages'. A rather cowardly dog, he never usually hangs around when danger is near. He wears green and blue dungarees, a white-nappy and a red collar.

Soo (voiced by Susie Blake) - A young child girl panda with an attitude who does not stand for any of the mischief the other two usually get themselves into. Soo could be seen as the sensible one who whips the others into some kind of organisation. She wears a blue dress and a light blue sash with a yellow flower on it and a white-nappy.

Little Cousin Scampi (voiced by Jimmy Hibbert) - The smallest and youngest of the gang, and Sooty's little cousin too. If mischief has been aroused, it is most probably this little bear who has orchestrated it. Little Cousin Scampi appears in a schoolboy outfit.

== Other characters ==
Katarina (voiced by Jimmy Hibbert) - A well spoken Persian cat who does not believe any of the gang's adventures down the trapdoor. She wears a pink velvet coat and a pink fedora with a feather on the top.

Captain Fogbound (voiced by Rob Rackstraw) - A ginger cat who pilots a hot air balloon and is courting Katarina. He wears an aviator hat, a dark green leather coat and a pair of brown gloves.

Cousin McScampi (voiced by Jimmy Hibbert) - Scampi's Scottish cousin, who is even worse at bagpipe playing than Scampi is, and wants to find the Loch Ness Monster.

The Aliens (voiced by Rob Rackstraw and Jimmy Hibbert) - Two aliens from the planet Alpha Romeo who become friends with the gang after Sooty saves their spaceship from crashing into the theatre.

Morris the Mouse (voiced by Rob Rackstraw) - A male mouse who lives in the skirting boards of the attic that Sooty and the gang live in. He formerly lived behind the skirting boards of the stage, where he had hibernated since the Victorian era, and woke up because he was hungry for some cheese. He is normally very shy, but he sometimes comes along on the gang's adventures. Morris is not to be confused with the field mouse character with the same name from Muffin The Mule.

Sir Ray Fanshawe (voiced by Rob Rackstraw) - The former owner of the Fanshawe Theatre, who was buried alive underneath a mountain of sausages. He wears a purple fedora with a feather on the top, a Shakespearean ruff, and a purple Elizabethan shirt.

Captain Neecap (voiced by Jimmy Hibbert) - A villainous Frenchman who owns both a submarine and a drilling machine. He is often hatching schemes to capture Sooty and the gang.

== Archival status ==
In 2014, Richard Cadell claimed in an interview that when he acquired the rights to Sooty from HIT Entertainment in 2008, he received much archived Sooty material in the process. Said materials included the master tapes to the Sooty's Amazing Adventures series, which he destroyed out of personal distaste for the series. Cadell has since been approached by many other outside sources with the idea, and also attempt, of producing an animated CGI version of Sooty, but he does not want such a series to be made.

However, the entire series still exists in the ITV Archive, even though ITV themselves do not currently own the rights to the series. The BFI National Archive also hold four episodes of the series recorded from their original broadcasts on VHS, and there were two commercial VHS releases of the series in 1997 and 1999.

== Episode list ==
=== Series 1 ===
No. in series	Title	Original release date
1	"Alas, Poor Sooty"	6 January 1997
To entertain Katarina, Sooty and his friends must put on their own version of William Shakespeare's "Romeo and Juliet". This episode was written by Roger Stennett and Glenn Leopold and directed by Jon Doyle and Bruno Branchi.
2	"Hopalong Sooty"	13 January 1997
Sweep wants to go back in time to the Wild West via the trapdoor, but once he and the rest of the gang get there, they encounter a criminal named "Filthy Ted" and Sooty tries to sort him out. This episode was written by Jimmy Hibbert and Chris Trengove and directed by Jon Doyle and Bruno Branchi.
3	"Scampi and the Computer Chips"	20 January 1997
Scampi builds a robot so that he doesn't have to clean up the theatre in time for Katarina's theatre group, but unfortunately, the robot goes haywire and the gang has to stop it. This episode was written by Jimmy Hibbert and Chris Trengove and directed by Jon Doyle and Bruno Branchi.
4	"A Hard Day's Knight"	27 January 1997
When the gang stops by an ancient wishing well, Scampi tosses a coin into it and wishes them that they are back in the medieval times. Once the wish becomes true, they encounter Sir Oswald the Merciless, who engages Sooty into a brawl. This episode was written by Roger Stennett and Glenn Leopold and directed by Jon Doyle and Bruno Branchi.
5	"Mummy's Boys"	3 February 1997
Sooty and his friends decide they want to take a sporting holiday in Switzerland, but the magic trapdoor takes them to Egypt. Despite some trouble, the gang still has fun and return home where Katarina will not believe a word they say. This episode was written by Roger Stennett and Glenn Leopold and directed by Jon Doyle and Bruno Branchi.
6	"Things That Go McSqueak in the Night"	10 February 1997
Sooty and the gang find themselves being chased by a howling monster on the moors of Scotland. This episode was written by Roger Stennett and Glenn Leopold and directed by Jon Doyle and Bruno Branchi.
7	"Hot Air"	17 February 1997
Soo, Sweep, and Scampi are floating away in Captain Fogbound's hot air balloon and it's down to Sooty to rescue them. This episode was written by Jimmy Hibbert and Chris Trengove and directed by Jon Doyle and Bruno Branchi.
8	"Desert Song"	24 February 1997
Sooty, Sweep, Soo, and Scampi fancy a holiday to the Arctic to get away from the heatwave. The magic trap door has other ideas and transports the gang to a desert, where they accidentally join the French legionaries. This episode was written by Jimmy Hibbert and Chris Trengove and directed by Jon Doyle and Bruno Branchi.
9	"A Fishy Tale"	3 March 1997
Sooty and the gang decide to spend a day at the beach, but Sweep and Soo are captured by the villainous Captain Neecap in his submarine. This episode was written by Jimmy Hibbert and Chris Trengove and directed by Jon Doyle and Bruno Branchi.
10	"The Abominable Snowball"	10 March 1997
Sooty and the gang travel to the Himalayas to have tea with the Abominable Snowman, but all they can find when they get to his cave is a very hairy snowball. This episode was written by Roger Stennett and Glenn Leopold and directed by Jon Doyle and Bruno Branchi.
11	"Mouse Busters"	17 March 1997
Katarina asks Sooty and the gang to get rid of a mouse, named Morris, who is roaming around the stage and hungry after hibernating since the Victorian era. Morris turns out to be harmless, and becomes friends with Sooty and the gang. This episode was written by Roger Stennett and Glenn Leopold and directed by Jon Doyle and Bruno Branchi.
12	"My Fair Katarina"	24 March 1997
Katarina is upset that she never gets to go on Sooty and the gang's adventures, so Scampi decides to take her to a theme park on the planet Jupiter. But when she has a ride on a rollercoaster, it breaks down and she ends up speeding around the track! This episode was written by Jimmy Hibbert and Chris Trengove and directed by Jon Doyle and Bruno Branchi.
13	"Close Encounters of the Furred Kind"	31 March 1997
Sooty and his friends are on the roof of the theatre having a nighttime picnic. Sooty and Soo are looking at the stars, when Soo spots a shooting star. Later, during their picnic, Soo thinks that she sees another shooting star, but it is actually an alien spaceship, and the gang get abducted by the aliens inside. This episode was written by Roger Stennett and Glenn Leopold and directed by Jon Doyle and Bruno Branchi.

=== Series 2 ===
No. in series	Title	Original release date
1	"Mars, She's Making Eyes at Me"	5 January 1998
Sooty and his friends are whisked away to Mars by their space alien friends. This episode was written by Roger Stennett and Glenn Leopold and directed by Jon Doyle, Bruno Branchi and Rick Hoberg.
2	"A Knight at the Theatre"	12 January 1998
Sooty saves Sweep from the ghost of Sir Ray Fanshawe, the former owner of the theatre who has a fear of sausages after he was buried alive in them, and as gratitude, the ghost offers them tickets to a magic show that's taking place 100 years in the past. Unfortunately, when Sooty takes part in the show and conjures up an elephant, it runs amok and the gang must stop it. This episode was written by Jimmy Hibbert and Chris Trengove and directed by Jon Doyle and Bruno Branchi.
3	"Crocodile Aberdeen"	19 January 1998
Sooty and the gang go on an adventure to Australia, and Sooty must rescue Sweep, Soo and Scampi from some talking kangaroos. This episode was written by Roger Stennett and Glenn Leopold and directed by Jon Doyle and Bruno Branchi.
4	"Long John Sooty"	26 January 1998
Sooty and the gang find a pirate ship on the beach, and decide to set out on a pirate adventure. This episode was written by Jimmy Hibbert and Chris Trengove and directed by Jon Doyle and Bruno Branchi.
5	"Hadrian's Wallpaper"	2 February 1998
Sooty and the gang travel to Rome in AD 128, where they see Emperor Hadrian, who has a problem with his wall. They decide to decorate it with wallpaper. This episode was written by Roger Stennett and Glenn Leopold and directed by Jon Doyle and Bruno Branchi.
6	"Journey to the Centre of the Aaaargh!"	9 February 1998
Little Cousin Scampi decides to dig a tunnel deep into the ground and find out what at's the centre of the earth, but he gets lost, and can't get back home - and things only get worse when Captain Neecap captures him. Can Sooty, Sweep and Soo rescue him? This episode was written by Jimmy Hibbert and Chris Trengove and directed by Jon Doyle and Bruno Branchi.
7	"The Big Picture"	16 February 1998
After seeing a film on the telly which Sooty, Scampi and Sweep think is rubbish, they decide to make their own motion picture with the help of Katarina and Captain Fogbound. This episode was written by Roger Stennett and Glenn Leopold and directed by Jon Doyle and Bruno Branchi.
8	"Life's Such a Dragon"	23 February 1998
The gang decide to go scuba diving in a coral reef with exotic fish, but the trapdoor instead takes them to a medieval kingdom where they must rescue a princess from a dragon. This episode was written by Jimmy Hibbert and Chris Trengove and directed by Jon Doyle and Bruno Branchi.
9	"The Loch Ness Monster"	2 March 1998
Sooty and the gang go back to Scotland, where they help Cousin McScampi track the Loch Ness Monster in his submarine. This episode was written by Roger Stennett and Glenn Leopold and directed by Jon Doyle and Bruno Branchi.
10	"It Came From the Coal Shed"	9 March 1998
Sweep is convinced that the ghost of Sir Ray Fanshawe is haunting the coal shed, as it was full of sausages. The others don't believe him though, except for Morris the Mouse. Can Morris overcome his fear of ghosts and help Sweep to stop Sir Ray from haunting the coal shed? This episode was written by Jimmy Hibbert and Chris Trengove and directed by Jon Doyle and Bruno Branchi.
11	"Life's a Beach"	16 March 1998
Sooty and the gang, along with Katarina (without makeup), spend a day at the beach. This episode was written by Roger Stennett and Glenn Leopold and directed by Jon Doyle and Bruno Branchi.
12	"They're Playing Our Toon"	23 March 1998
Thanks to Scampi's new invention, Sooty, Sweep and Soo have found themselves inside his favourite cartoon! Can Scampi rescue them? This episode was written by Jimmy Hibbert and Chris Trengove and directed by Jon Doyle and Bruno Branchi.
13	"Jurassic Car Park"	30 March 1998
A new car park is being built near the theatre, and Sooty and the gang decide to help. But during the groundbreaking, dinosaur fossils are found, so Soo tries to figure out where they came from. This episode was written by Roger Stennett and Glenn Leopold and directed by Jon Doyle and Bruno Branchi.
