= Soo (puppet) =

Glove puppet character

- Soo (left) with Sooty
- Portrayed by: Marjorie Corbett (voice; 1964–1980); Brenda Longman (voice; 1981–Present); Susie Blake (voice; 1997-98, animated series only); Sheila Clark (voice; 2001–04, TV series only)

In-universe information
- Species: Panda
- Gender: Female
- Nationality: British

Soo is a British glove puppet and TV character from the show Sooty and first appeared in 1964 as the girlfriend of Sooty. Soo is an intelligent, calm and collected female panda who acts as the foil for both Sooty and Sweep. In the second and Third 2001-2004 TV series she became stroppy and bossy.

Soo usually wears a red skirt, although in the spin-off series Sooty's Amazing Adventures, she wears a blue dress with a yellow flower on it and a white nappy. In the 2001-2004 series she can be seen wearing a head band with many different outfits.

== Voice ==
The original voice artist and puppeteer for Soo was Harry Corbett's wife, Marjorie Corbett, who voiced Soo until 1980. Brenda Longman took over in 1981. In 2001, when the new owners of Sooty, Hit Entertainment, overhauled the production Sheila Clark became the voice of Soo in the second and third series of Sooty from 2001 - 2004.

Brenda Longman continued to play the character away from the TV series and in 2002 featured as Soo's voice in some McDonald's Happy Meals adverts. When Richard Cadell bought the rights to Sooty, Longman was asked back and her first TV appearance as Soo was when she appeared on The Weakest Link in 2007. She has remained since and currently voices her in Sooty show.

== Other appearances ==
Soo, along with Sooty and Sweep, appear in The Goodies episode The Goodies Rule – O.K.?

In 1991, Soo along with many other puppets appeared in the 1991 Comic Relief music video Helping Hand.

In December 2007, Soo appeared on, and won, a puppet special of The Weakest Link hosted by Anne Robinson which was originally broadcast on 28 December 2007 at 6pm on BBC One, and was the strongest link statistically five times in the game, in Rounds 1, 2, 5, 6, and 7. She raised £11,500 for her chosen charity, the World Wide Fund for Nature, after defeating Roland Rat, and when voting, she generally sided with the majority of the other puppets, and was the deciding vote in Round 7, eliminating Nobby the Sheep. She is the second puppet to win The Weakest Link after Basil Brush. In her appearance on The Weakest Link, it is revealed that she owns a pair of wellingtons and wore them to the show.

On 30 September 2008, Brenda Longman, assisted by Soo, appeared on BBC One's Bargain Hunt, buying antiques at London's Portobello Road Market and then selling them at Bellmans Auction House in Sussex.

== Filmography ==
Year	Title	Role	Notes
1964–1992	The Sooty Show	Herself	
1989–1991	Learn With Sooty	Herself	TV spin-off series
1993–1998	Sooty & Co.	Herself	
1996–1997	Sooty's Amazing Adventures	Herself	TV spin-off series
1999–2000	Sooty Heights	Herself	
2001–2004	Sooty	Herself	
2007	The Weakest Link: Puppet Special	Herself, Contestant	Won £11,500 for WWF
2008	Bargain Hunt	Herself, Guest	1 episode
2011– 2022	Sooty	Herself	3 series

== See also ==
- Sooty
- Sweep (puppet)
- Richard Cadell
