= Sooty (2011 TV series) =

2011–2014 British children's TV show

- Genre: Children's; Slapstick comedy Puppet show
- Presented by: Richard Cadell
- Starring: Sooty; Sweep; Soo
- Voices of: Brenda Longman
- Composer: Barrie Bignold
- Country of origin: United Kingdom
- Original language: English
- No. of series: 3
- No. of episodes: 59

Production
- Production locations: Brean Leisure Park, Somerset (series 1-3); Crealy Theme Park & Resort (special)
- Running time: 11 minutes
- Production companies: Tivoli Media Ltd (series 1-2); Cadells Limited

Original release
- Network: CITV (Series 1-2); ITVBe (Series 3)
- Release: 5 September 2011 – 21 February 2022

Related
- Sooty (2001–2004)

Sooty is a British children's television series, shown by ITV from 5 September 2011 to 8 October 2018. It was the fifth incarnation of the franchise to feature the titular puppet character Sooty. The programme focuses on the antics of Sooty, his friends Sweep and Soo, and the presenter, Richard Cadell, who run a holiday park near a seaside resort.

== Overview ==
Sooty revolves around the storyline of Richard Cadell, the presenter starting a brand new job at 'Slater's Holiday Park' (filmed at Brean Leisure Park, which was co-owned by Cadell) set in an English coastal resort, who lives with Sooty (the titular character), Sweep and Soo, the group often causing chaos around the park, which gets Richard into trouble with the owner. Most episodes feature celebrity guests.

In June 2008, Cadell had acquired the rights to the Sooty franchise, and planned to bring back the character in a new series. Cadell spent £30,000 on a pilot episode in 2009, which led to ITV re-commissioning the series for 26 episodes.

Filming took place in July 2011, with scenes mainly filmed outdoors. Paul Daniels was injured after having a pizza thrown at him whilst filming an episode of the show.

In October 2014, BBC Worldwide was appointed the licensor for the series in Australia and New Zealand. Sooty returned in 2018 for its final series of six episodes.

== Cast and characters ==
- Richard Cadell as himself, the long-suffering presenter of the show who lives in a caravan with Sooty and the gang.
- Sooty, the show's protagonist; a mute yellow bear who owns a magic wand whose power is invoked using the words "Izzy wizzy, Let's get busy!"
- Sweep, a dim-witted grey dog, who communicates using bizarre squeaks.
- Soo (voiced by Brenda Longman), a calm and collected female panda who acts as the foil for both Sooty and Sweep.
- Martyn James as Mr. Slater, the short-tempered owner of the holiday park, who often threatens to give Richard the "sack".
- Joe Pasquale as the Black Hand, Sooty's archnemesis who wears a distinctive yellow and black outfit.

Most episodes feature celebrity guests, including Matthew Corbett, Stacey Solomon, Frank Bruno, Peter Andre, Keith Chegwin and Ann Widdecombe.

== Episodes ==
=== Series overview ===
Series	Episodes	Originally released	
Series	Episodes	First released	Last released
1	26	5 September 2011	16 November 2011
2	26	7 September 2013	1 December 2013
3	6	3 September 2018	8 October 2018

=== Pilot (2009) ===
The series pilot, "The Big Day Out", was released direct-to-DVD on 28 August 2009. The episode features Brenda Longman, Wink Taylor and Mark Roper.

=== Series 1 (2011) ===
Broadcast Saturday and Sunday mornings on ITV1 at 7:25am.

No. overall	No. in series	Title	Original release date
1	1	"The Wedding"	5 September 2011
Richard's been acting differently all week, and Sooty and the gang are convinced he's getting married. There's just one problem - they haven't been invited! With the wedding only a day away, can Sooty and Sweep keep out of mischief and give Richard a day to remember? Featuring: Stacey Solomon
2	2	"The Swimming Lesson"	5 September 2011
Sweep is scared of the water, and can't get his Frisbee when it lands in the sea. Luckily Richard is giving swimming lesson at the Holiday Park and Sooty is determined that Sweep will join in – if he stops sunbathing that is! Will Sweep take the plunge and overcome his fears?
3	3	"The Great Race"	6 September 2011
It's the annual Go Kart Race at Slater's Holiday Park. When Richard and Sweep's kart goes up in smoke, Sooty and Soo enter the race in the campervan. But to win, they have to overcome the dirty tricks of cheating competitor Fred Firewheel. Featuring: Justin Lee Collins
4	4	"Squeaky Clean"	7 September 2011
Mr. Slater is coming for tea, and Sooty's cleaning Richard's room, Sweep's in charge of the dishes, and all is set for a great evening. But with a crazy vacuum cleaner on the loose and Richard covered in paint and smashed crockery, their plans for a dream tea look set for disaster. Richard wants Mr. Slater to take charge, unfortunately, Mr. Slater calls to say that he's not coming.
5	5	"The Farm"	8 September 2011
Richard's making donuts to sell on the park, but he's run out of eggs and milk - no thanks to Sooty and Sweep getting into a fight making the donut batter. Perhaps the local farmer and his chickens and cow can help? Sooty and the gang take a trip in the campervan to find out, but leave Richard in a rather messy situation. Featuring: Keith Chegwin
6	6	"Poorly Soo"	9 September 2011
Soo's had an accident on her roller-skates and needs to stay in bed. Luckily Sooty and Sweep are on hand to bake Soo a cake, only with egg shells and pepper! Can Richard roll to the rescue, or is this another recipe for disaster?
7	7	"The Souvenir Stall"	12 September 2011
The gang are opening a souvenir pottery stall at the park. After all the pottery accidentally gets smashed, Sooty tries to make some more using fresh clay. But things don't go quite to plan. Meanwhile, Soo and Sweep attempt to mend the pots and attract customers so that Richard doesn't lose his job.
8	8	"The Alarm System"	13 September 2011
When Richard becomes concerned about security at the park, it's Sooty Security Services to the rescue. With trip-wires and traps set, Sooty's caravan has never been safer. But when the police arrive at the park, could it be Richard who is caught red-handed? Featuring: John Shuttleworth (Graham Fellows)
9	9	"The Sports Day"	14 September 2011
It's the annual Sports Day, and Sooty and Sweep are competing for the Cup. After some disastrous training in the gym, they head out to the arena for an egg and spoon and sack race. The final sees the boys attempting to break the world record at the long jump – but who will win the day?
10	10	"Sooty of the Seven Seas"	15 September 2011
Sooty and Sweep want to be pirates, and with a lick of paint and a new mast, their pirate boat is soon ready to sail. But can they defeat the fearsome pirate of the lake?
11	11	"The Wendy House"	16 September 2011
Soo has lost her favourite necklace, and Sooty and Sweep are determined to cheer her up. With Richard's help, the boys decide to decorate her old Wendy house, but as always, paint, wallpaper, and glue go flying along the way.
12	12	"The Magic Show"	19 September 2011
A broken wand forces Sooty to stop his magic show. With Sweep stuck in the sawing-in-half box and Richard transformed into a chicken, Sooty must put things right if he's going to impress world famous magician Paul Daniels and his assistant Debbie McGee. Featuring: Debbie McGee and Paul Daniels
13	13	"Drive in the Country"	20 September 2011
It's Richard's day off and Sooty and Sweep have helped him prepare a picnic. But with "Sooty-Stig" driving the campervan, a flat tire and no petrol, will Richard ever get a peaceful drive in the country?
14	14	"The Great Outdoors"	31 October 2011
Richard is taking the Children's Club on a camping trip into the country, but Sooty and Sweep sneak along too. With Sweep in charge of map reading and Sooty playing tricks with his magic wand, it's not long before things go wrong. Can the gang put up the tent and set out the barbecue before a thunderstorm arrives?
15	15	"The Children's Party"	1 November 2011
It's the grand opening of Slater's Children's Club and Sooty, Sweep and Soo are helping Richard organize a party. Once the children arrive, it soon becomes clear that it's not going to be easy to keep them entertained. Sooty decides to play musical statues, but Sweep succeeds in messing everything up. Will Mr. Slater be happy or will Richard lose his job?
16	16	"Down the Drain"	2 November 2011
There's no water at the park! The gang's shower has stopped working, and Richard is covered in mud. It's down to plumbers Sooty and Sweep to put things right in time for the opening of the new picnic area – but not everybody will stay dry.
17	17	"Chocco Chimp"	3 November 2011
The prizes have disappeared from Mr. Slater's new crazy golf course, and Richard is puzzled. Before long, world famous detectives Sherlock Sooty and Doctor Watsit are called in to investigate, and set a trap to catch the thief who turns out to be their old friend, Matthew Corbett. Featuring: Matthew Corbett
18	18	"Who's A Clever Bird?"	4 November 2011
Richard has booked a circus to entertain the guests, but it hasn't arrived, so Sooty asks the owner of the bird garden to save the day with his clever budgies. Finally, circus clowns Sooty and Sweep attempt to walk the tightrope – but will it be enough to entertain the guests? Featuring: Jimmy Carlo and Norman Barrett
19	19	"Beach Patrol"	7 November 2011
Mr. Slater has put Richard in charge of the beach and the gang decide to join him. After jumping on the bouncy castle, Sooty, Sweep and Soo meet a friendly sand sculptor and have a sandcastle building competition. This lands poor Richard in deep water. Featuring: Frank Bruno
20	20	"The New Poster"	8 November 2011
Richard is set to lose his job if business doesn't improve. Sooty and Sweep decide to make some new posters to advertise Slater's Holidays, and this means tricking Richard into having his photographs at the worst possible moments. What will the guests think of the disastrous results?
21	21	"Pizza to Go"	9 November 2011
Sooty and the gang are put in charge of Mr. Slater's Pizza Parlour, only Soo would rather be a top fashion designer like Valentino Du Prado. As things go from bad to worse in the kitchen, pizzas start flying off the shelves – literally. Perhaps a special visitor can lend a hand? Featuring: Brendan Cole
22	22	"The Runaway Bath"	10 November 2011
A mucky Sweep is told take a bath and clean himself up – only he gets his paw stuck in the tap. And when Sooty comes to the rescue in his campervan, the situation soon heads for disaster. Meanwhile, Richard is hoping to make a splash with Mr. Slater's donkey rides, but will he get more than he bargained for?
23	23	"Run Rabbit Run"	11 November 2011
Richard is nervous when he finds out the park is due for an inspection. But when Sooty builds a robot called Harry to help him tidy, it's not long before everything is spotless. If only Soo's rabbit, Twinkle, wasn't on the loose... Featuring: Ken Morley
24	24	"The New Ride"	14 November 2011
With the Lady Mayoress coming to open the Park's new ghost train, Sooty and the gang are determined to impress her. But when Richard's best suit is ruined and Sweep is in charge of the banners, it's a race against time to get everything ready. Featuring: Ann Widdecombe
25	25	"The Marching Band"	15 November 2011
Richard is preparing a show that will blow everything away, and the gang are desperate to take part. But what can Sweep do? With his bagpipes and batons causing nothing but trouble, Sooty comes up with some mischief of his own.
26	26	"Pop Concert"	16 November 2011
Richard is hosting a pop concert for one of his favourite singers, Maybe Goo Ga – only she hasn't arrived. With a crowd of people waiting to see her, it's up to the gang to keep them entertained. But as time ticks on, it's down to Sweep to take the stage and give the performance of a lifetime.

=== Series 2 (2013) ===
Broadcast Saturday and Sunday mornings on ITV1 at 7:25am.

No. overall	No. in series	Title	Original release date
27	1	"Fitness Funatic"	7 September 2013
Richard is going to test out Slater's Fitness Centre in the grounds of the Holiday Park. But just as he leaves, Mr. Slater phones Richard to say that the fitness centre is short staffed that day - however, as Richard forgot his phone when he left, Soo answers and she, Sooty and Sweep step in to help out. Will their efforts make for success or failure? Featuring: Amy Childs
28	2	"The New Building"	8 September 2013
A new toilet is being installed, with the official opening later that day. But with Sooty and Sweep in charge of the building work and Richard's clean suits quickly diminishing, will he be flushed with success or will it be a flash in the pan?
29	3	"The Black Hand"	14 September 2013
Featuring: Joe Pasquale
30	4	"Sooty's Space Rocket"	15 September 2013
31	5	"Five Star Fish"	21 September 2013
A five star restaurant, Chez Soo, has opened up in the grounds of Slater's Holiday Park. Richard has been given the job of the head waiter and Maxine Gastro, a very close friend of Mr. Slater, is paying a visit. She fancies fish that day. But with Sooty and Sweep as head fishermen, will Maxine get what she ordered? Featuring: Caroline Quentin
32	6	"The Early Night"	22 September 2013
33	7	"The Genie"	28 September 2013
A Genie comes out a magic lamp that Sooty finds, and causes nothing but trouble. Featuring: Dave Benson Phillips
34	8	"Easter Time"	29 September 2013
35	9	"Sooty Takes Off"	5 October 2013
Richard bans Sooty, Sweep and Soo from attending the Junior Flyers' Club which he has been put in charge of. So Sooty and the gang go to the Fleet Air Arm Museum in Somerset and fly round the world.
36	10	"The Fancy Dress Party"	6 October 2013
Featuring: Shaun Williamson
37	11	"April Foolishness"	12 October 2013
It's April Fool's Day and Richard is determined not to be the biggest fool, like last year, by refusing to fall for any practical jokes in the air.
38	12	"The Inventions Game"	13 October 2013
Featuring: John Thomson
39	13	"Balancing Act"	19 October 2013
40	14	"Cow Capers"	20 October 2013
Featuring: Stu Francis
41	15	"The Rainy Day"	26 October 2013
Sooty and Sweep's green wellies are shown, while Soo has pink wellies.
42	16	"The Haunted House"	27 October 2013
43	17	"The Dance Competition"	2 November 2013
Featuring: Helen Pearson
44	18	"Fireworks"	3 November 2013
45	19	"It's A Dog's Life"	9 November 2013
Featuring: The Krankies
46	20	"Record Breakers"	10 November 2013
Featuring: Richard Arnold
47	21	"Some Holiday"	16 November 2013
48	22	"Wacky Washing"	17 November 2013
49	23	"The Silent Movie"	23 November 2013
50	24	"Disco Disco!"	24 November 2013
Featuring: B*Witched
51	25	"Panto Palaver"	30 November 2013
52	26	"Pranks and Presents"	1 December 2013
Featuring: Brian Blessed

=== Series 3 (2018) ===
Broadcast Monday mornings on ITVBe at 9:15am.

No. overall	No. in series	Title	Original release date
53	1	"The Garden Party"	3 September 2018
The gang prepare Mr Slater's stately home for a lavish garden party. But with changing weather and a broken statue, can Sooty's magic save the day?
54	2	"Wash and Wax"	10 September 2018
Richard, Sooty, Sweep, and Soo have opened a hair salon and a car washing service at Slater's Holiday Park. Will their services bring filthy-rich revenue or prove to be a wash-out? Featuring: Lisa Riley
55	3	"Who's Got Talent?"	17 September 2018
Sweep takes singing and dancing lessons from Steps star Faye Tozer - but will he be good enough to win Mr Slater's talent show? Featuring: Faye Tozer
56	4	"Wild Wild West"	24 September 2018
It's cowboy festival time at Slaters... but the actor behind Big Bad Pete has not turned up for the water pistol shootout. Featuring: Peter Andre
57	5	"Jurassic Lark"	1 October 2018
Sooty's time machine accidentally transports the gang back to the land of the dinosaurs.
58	6	"Just Desserts"	8 October 2018
Sooty, Sweep and Soo open an ice cream parlour with disastrous results. Featuring: John Challis

=== Special (2022) ===
On 21 February 2022, a special episode was released to promote the opening of Sooty Land at Crealy Theme Park.

No. overall	No. in series	Title	Original release date
59	1	"Crealy Magic"	21 February 2022
The gang go to Crealy Theme Park & Resort to perform a magic show.
