= Steve Money =

English actor

- Occupation: Actor
- Years active: 1987–2019
- Television: Coronation Street; Waterloo Road

Steve Money is an English retired actor. With a career spanning three decades, he is known for portraying roles including D.S. Marsh in the BBC soap opera EastEnders, Eric Sutherland the ITV soap opera Coronation Street and Clarence Charles in the BBC school drama Waterloo Road. He has also made appearances in numerous films and other television series, including The Sharp End, Casualty, The Second Coming, Doctors, Ackley Bridge and Years and Years.

== Life and career ==
Money made his acting debut in 1987 in an episode of the BBC medical drama Casualty. In 1991, he appeared as Eric in the comedy series The Sharp End. Money went on to appear in array of television shows and films including several more episodes of Casualty, as well as EastEnders, The Second Coming and Doctors and Emmerdale. After various minor roles in Coronation Street, he took on the role of Eric Sutherland in 2000, the father of Maria and Kirk Sutherland. He appeared as the character in several more episodes until the following year, as well as guest appearances in 2005, 2008 and 2015 respectively.

Between 2006 and 2009, Money played the role of Clarence Charles, the father of Donte Charles (Adam Thomas) in the BBC school drama Waterloo Road. He also made appearances in Holby City, Hollyoaks, The Royle Family, 4 O'Clock Club and Trollied. Between 2018 and 2019, he played Grandpa Murgatroyd in the Channel 4 series Ackley Bridge. His most recent acting role was as Arthur in the BBC drama Years and Years in 2019.

== Filmography ==
| Year | Title | Role | Notes |
|---|---|---|---|
| 1987 | Casualty | Building Worker | Episode: "The Raid" |
| 1989 | Nice Work | Foundry Worker | 3 episodes |
| 1989 | Boon | Bouncer #2 | Episode: "The Eyes of Texas" |
| 1990 | Shoot to Kill | Special Branch Officer | Television film |
| 1990 | Coasting | Dave | Episode: "Offshore" |
| 1991 | The Sharp End | Eric | Regular role |
| 1992 | Coronation Street | Thug | 1 episode |
| 1995 | Cracker | Cutter | Episode: "Best Boys Part 1" |
| 1995 | Sooty & Co. | Delivery Man | Episode: "Recognition Factor" |
| 1996 | Emmerdale | Tony | 2 episodes |
| 1996 | Cardiac Arrest | Mustafa | 2 episodes |
| 1996 | Prime Suspect | Desk Sergeant | Episode: "Errors of Judgement: Part 1" |
| 1996 | Hillsborough | Additional cast | Television film |
| 1997 | The Missing Postman | Truck Driver | Television film |
| 1997 | Coronation Street | Ted | Prison guard |
| 1998 | Where the Heart Is | Man in Pub | Episode: "Darkness Follows" |
| 1998 | Dalziel and Pascoe | Davis | Episode: "The Wood Beyond" |
| 1998 | The Cops | Noble | 1 episode |
| 1999 | Cold Feet | Tattooist | 1 episode |
| 1999, 2003, 2011 | EastEnders | D.S. Marsh | Recurring role; 9 episodes |
| 2000–2001, 2005, 2008, 2015 | Coronation Street | Eric Sutherland | Recurring role |
| 2000 | City Central | Frank Stone | Episode: "She's the One" |
| 2000 | Heartbeat | Donald Snellgrove | Episode: "Gabriel's Last Stand" |
| 2001 | Clocking Off | Les | Episode: "Ronnie's Story" |
| 2001 | Strumpet | Dirty Face | Television film |
| 2001 | When I Was 12 | Lee's Dad | Television film |
| 2001 | Linda Green | Taxi Driver | Episode: "Victim Support" |
| 2002 | Attachments | Fat Chas | 2 episodes |
| 2002 | NCS: Manhunt | Brian O'Rourke | Episode: "Out of Time: Part 1" |
| 2002 | Al's Lads | Burly Stoker | Film role |
| 2002 | Emmerdale | Scrap dealer | 1 episode |
| 2002 | Paradise Heights | Huge Guy | 1 episode |
| 2002 | The Stretford Wives | Guard #1 | Television film |
| 2002 | Phoenix Nights | Fanny's husband | 2 episodes |
| 2002 | Jeffrey Archer: The Truth | Razors | Television film |
| 2003 | The Second Coming | Stan Lynch | 1 episode |
| 2003 | Burn It | Stan Lynch | 2 episodes |
| 2003 | Doctors | Den Wilton | Episode: "Gravy on That?" |
| 2003 | The Royal | Mr. Bowman | Episode: "All at Sea" |
| 2003 | Grease Monkeys | Landlord | Episode: "Happy Days" |
| 2003 | Eyes Down | Polaroid Man | Episode: "Indecency" |
| 2004 | Conviction | Mick Barker | 1 episode |
| 2005 | Big Dippers | Victor | Television film |
| 2005 | Casanova | Innkeeper | 1 episode |
| 2005 | No Angels | Dreg | 1 episode |
| 2005 | Donovan | Malcolm Price | 1 episode |
| 2005 | A Very Social Secretary | Drunk | Television film |
| 2006 | Holby City | David Foster | Episode: "The Truth Will Out" |
| 2006–2009 | Waterloo Road | Clarence Charles | Recurring role; 8 episodes |
| 2007 | The Life and Times of Vivienne Vyle | Security Guard | 1 episode |
| 2008 | Doctors | PC Barry Shaw | Episode: "A Kind of Hush" |
| 2008 | Bike Squad | DS Gary Bliss | Television film |
| 2008 | Three and Out | Muscles | Film role |
| 2009 | The Street | James' Dad | Episode: "Past Life" |
| 2009 | The Tudors | Blacksmith | Episode: "Civil Unrest" |
| 2009 | Hope Springs | Wayne Fletcher | 1 episodes |
| 2010 | Hollyoaks | Gordon | 1 episode |
| 2011 | Candy Cabs | Gary | 3 episodes |
| 2012 | Hit & Miss | Wayne | 3 episodes |
| 2012 | Doctors | Colin Mowbray | Episode: "Beautiful Girl" |
| 2012 | The Royle Family | Petula | Episode: "Barbara's Old Ring" |
| 2013 | Great Night Out | Angry Man | 1 episode |
| 2013 | The Christmas Candle | Mill Worker Joe | Film role |
| 2014 | 4 O'Clock Club | Maths Teacher | Episode: "Gold" |
| 2014 | Casualty | Gordon Henry | Episode: "The Lies We Tell" |
| 2016 | Moving On | Concrete Mixer Driver | Episode: "Scratch" |
| 2016 | Miss Peregrine's Home for Peculiar Children | Burley Bloke | Film |
| 2016 | Trollied | Big Len | 1 episode |
| 2017 | Snatch | Clive the Barman | 2 episodes |
| 2017 | Funny Cow | Fat Cunt | Film role |
| 2017–2019 | Ackley Bridge | Grandpa Murgatroyd | Recurring role; 6 episodes |
| 2019 | Years and Years | Arthur | 1 episode |
