= Rob Rackstraw =

English voice actor (born 1965)

- Born: Robert Rackstraw; 31 October 1965 (age 61); Sunderland, England
- Occupation: Voice actor
- Years active: 1985–present
- Agent: Fuller voices

Robert Rackstraw (born 31 October 1965) is an English voice actor who has worked in various animated films, television shows and video games.

== Early life ==
Rackstraw grew up in the Sunderland suburb of New Silksworth, and attended Southmoor Comprehensive. His voice acting career began with a chance meeting with a local radio presenter, when he began writing scripts for radio adverts, and later voicing them. He said in 2013: “I thought it was daft that these guys get paid a lot more FOR reading than I was FOR writing. So I started augmenting my income by writing ridiculous things and accents into my scripts that no one else could do but me. I eventually got a show reel together and I started sending it all over the country."

== Filmography ==
=== Film ===
Year	Title	Role	Notes
1993	Zit: The Video	All voices	Uncredited
1994	Friendly Monsters: A Monster Holiday	Ted, Jock, Norma, Fred, Hattie, Jim, Dan, Roger and Colin	Main UK role
1994	Friendly Monsters: A Monster Easter	Ted, Jock, Norma, Fred, Hattie, Jim, Dan, Roger and Colin	Main UK role
1994	Friendly Monsters: A Monster Christmas	Ted, Jock, Norma, Fred, Hattie, Jim, Dan, Roger and Colin	Main UK role
2001	Bob the Builder: A Christmas to Remember	Scoop, Muck, Mr. Bentley, Spud and Travis	Main UK role
2002	Bob the Builder: The Live Show	Scoop, Muck, Spud and Mr. Bentley	Main UK role
2003	Bob the Builder: The Knights Of Can a Lot	Scoop, Muck, Mr. Bentley, Mr. Ellis and Spud	Main UK role
2004	Bob the Builder: Snowed Under	Scoop, Muck, Spud, Travis	Main UK role
2005	Renart the Fox	Rufus	
2005	Zemanovaload	Finger Bob and Finger Pete	
2006	Robin Hood: Quest for the King	Badger, Pelican, King Leapold and Bird	As part of the BKN Classic Series trilogy
2006	Bob the Builder: Built to be Wild	Scoop and Muck (UK) Spud	Main role
2008	Bob the Builder: Race to the Finish!	Scoop, Muck, and Travis (UK) Spud, Grabber and Mr. Bentley	Main role
2010	Bob the Builder: The Legend of the Golden Hammer	Scoop, Muck and Travis (UK) Spud	Main role
2011	Bob the Builder: Big Dino Dig	Scoop, Muck and Packer (UK) Spud and Mr. Bentley	Main role
2011	Eats, Shoots & Leaves	Narrator	
2012	The Patriot of America	Redcoat #1	
2015	Thomas & Friends: The Adventure Begins	James (US)	Main role
2015	Thomas & Friends: Sodor's Legend of the Lost Treasure	Toby (UK) James (US)	Supporting role
2015	Containment	Dan	
2016	Thomas & Friends: The Great Race	James and Norman (US) Donald, Axel, Raul, Etienne, Flynn and the Railway Show Announcer	Main/supporting role
2017	Thomas & Friends: Journey Beyond Sodor	Toby (UK) James and the Troublesome Trucks	Main role
2018	Thomas & Friends: Big World! Big Adventures!	Toby (UK) James, Donald, Big Mickey, additional voices	Recurring role
2024	Fox and Hare Save the Forest	Beaver, Rat, Tusk, Jack	World premiere at 74th Berlin International Film Festival.

=== Television ===
Years	Title	Role(s)	Notes
1992	Truckers	Dave the Policeman	
1993	Philbert Frog	All voices	
1993–94	Avenger Penguins	Rocky, Doc, Cecil Stink, Irv	
1993–95	The Legends of Treasure Island	Blind Pew	
1993–96, 1998	Gogs		
1995–96	Fantomcat	MacDuff, The Monitor	
1996	Pond Life		
1996–97	Sooty's Amazing Adventures	Sweep	
1997	Soul Music		
1997	Wyrd Sisters		
1997–98	Gogwana		
1998–99	Billy	Narrator, All voices except for Billy	
1999	Watership Down	Captain Campion, Captain Holly, Raincloud, Granite, Hickory	
1999	Lavender Castle	Roger, Isambard	
1999–2000	Foxbusters	Voracious, Attila, Farmer Farmer	
1999–2011	Bob the Builder	Scoop, Muck, Travis, Packer and Mr. Beasley (UK) Spud and Mr. Bentley (UK; 1999–2011 / US; Late 2005–11)	
2000	Sooty Heights	Butch, Ramsbottom	
2000	Spot's Musical Adventures	Narrator	
2000-02	The Lampies	Charge, Spark	
2001	Dr Otter	Dr Otter	
2001	Merlin the Magical Puppy	Narrator, Ernie, Oscar, Gull	
2002–04	Angelina Ballerina	Uncle Louis	
2003	Yoko! Jakamoko! Toto!	Toto	
2003	Metalheads		
2004	The Koala Brothers	Buster, George and Sammy	
2005	Gordon the Garden Gnome	Dez	
2005	Rudi and Trudi	Additional voices	
2005	Zemanovaload	Finger Bob, Finger Pete	
2005–08	Planet Sketch		
2006	Dr. Dog		
2006–08	The Secret Show	Professor Professor	
2007–08	Chop Socky Chooks	Chuckie Chan, Students	
2008	Famous 5: On the Case	Oscar Kirrin	
2008–09	The Mr. Men Show	Mr. Happy (Season 2), Mr. Messy, Mr. Noisy, Mr. Fussy and Mr. Tickle	
2009	Dennis and Gnasher	Various	
2010-21	Octonauts	Kwazii	
2010-15	Team Umizoomi	Doormouse (UK version)	
2012	Jelly Jamm	Cheating Bracelets	Guest star
2014–17	Boyster	Mr. Pluss	
2015–16	Wissper	Colin, Dad, Kev and Dan	
2015–18	Teletubbies	Various	
2015–2021	Thomas & Friends	Toby	UK version; Series 19 onwards
2015–2021	Thomas & Friends	Stanley and Monty	US version
2015–2021	Thomas & Friends	James (The Adventure Begins to Series 24; different accents and voices), Donald (Season 20 & 21), Flynn ("Rocky Rescue" to Series 23), Owen (Season 23 & 24), Hugo, Bradford, Big Mickey, Fergus Duncan/Small Controller, Thin Clergyman/Wilbert Awdry, additional voices	Succeeding Keith Wickham (UK) and Kerry Shale (US) as the role of James
2015–18	Messy Goes to Okido	Zim	
2018-19	The Amazing World of Gumball	Mr. Gruber, William	Episodes: "The Slip" & "The Agent"
2022–present	The Creature Cases	R.O.N., Wally Bungler, Harold Stinkwell, additional voices	Voice only
2025	Wolf King	Vankaskan, Vanmorten	Voice only

=== Video games ===
Year	Title	Voice role	References
1994	Retribution	Additional voices	
1997	Realms of the Haunting	Additional voices	
2004	Dragon Quest VIII: Journey of the Cursed King	Additional voices	
2005	Shinobido: Way of the Ninja	Taraba Ninja	
2007	The Witcher	Savolla, Olaf, Salamandra Bandit, Salamandra Mage, Citizens, Knights	
2009	Star Wars: The Force Unleashed	Obi-Wan Kenobi	Tatooine DLC; Credited as Rob Rackshaw
2009	Venetica	Additional voices	
2010	Harry Potter and the Deathly Hallows – Part 1	Announcer, Death Eater	
2011	Harry Potter and the Deathly Hallows – Part 2	Kingsley Shacklebolt, Death Eater, Announcers	
2011	Star Wars: The Old Republic	Kingsley Shacklebolt, Death Eater, Announcers	
2011	Anno 2070	Vadim Sokow	
2012	Captain Morgane and the Golden Turtle	Vasco	
2013	Star Wars: The Old Republic - Rise of the Hutt Cartel	Additional voices	
2013	The Raven	Director Abbas Mokhtar	
2013	Broken Sword 5: The Serpent's Curse	Adam, Hector Laine, Shears	
2014	Blackguards	Takate	
2014	Game of Thrones: A Telltale Games Series	Garibald Tarwick, Meeren Slave, Crow	
2015	Star Wars: The Old Republic - Knights of the Fallen Empire	2V-R8, additional voices	
2016	Sherlock Holmes: The Devils Daughter	Additional voices	
2016	Star Wars: The Old Republic - Knights of the Eternal Throne	Additional voices	
2017	Total War: Warhammer - Eshin Triad	Additional voices	
