= The Sharp End =

- Created by: Roy Clarke
- Directed by: Brian Parker; David Penn
- Starring: Gwen Taylor; James Cosmo; Philip Martin Brown
- Country of origin: United Kingdom
- Original language: English
- No. of series: 1
- No. of episodes: 8

Production
- Running time: 50 minutes

Original release
- Network: BBC1
- Release: 12 April – 31 May 1991

The Sharp End was a 1991 British television comedy drama starring Gwen Taylor, James Cosmo and Philip Martin Brown. It was written by Roy Clarke and directed by Brian Parker and David Penn, and ran for eight episodes on BBC1 from 12 April 1991. The programme was partly filmed on location in Stoke-on-Trent.

Taylor took the leading role of Celia Forrest, a recent widow who had decided to take on the running of her late husband's Debt Collection Agency. However, her decision to do this was much to the displeasure of her more ruthless business rival (Martin Brown), who tried everything in his power to close her business down.

James Cosmo also starred as Carmichael, an illiterate hermit who was hired by Forrest as her assistant. He spent much of the series riding around on a pushbike with a tape recorder on which Forrest would record instructions of his tasks for the day.

The duo managed to keep the company running, but the series was less successful, and was cancelled after one season. It also aired on ABC TV in Australia.
