= Harwich and Dovercourt High School =

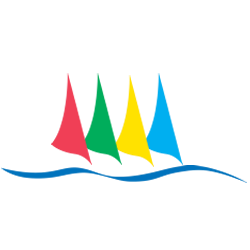

Location
- Hall Lane; Harwich, Essex, CO12 3TG; England
- Coordinates: 51°55′46″N 1°15′42″E

Information
- Type: Academy
- Motto: Working together, reading together and learning together.
- Established: 1958; 68 years ago
- Department for Education URN: 137946 Tables
- Ofsted: Reports
- Headteacher: Kate Finch
- Staff: 197
- Gender: Coeducational
- Age: 11 to 19
- Enrolment: 1210
- Houses: Heidelberg, Windsor, Alhambra, Versailles
- Former Name: Sir Anthony Deane School, The Harwich School
- Website: www.hdhs.org.uk

Harwich and Dovercourt High School is a secondary school and sixth form with academy status, located in Harwich in the English county of Essex. It was named the Sir Anthony Deane School until 1974, and was then known as the Harwich School. The school faced controversy in 2006 when parents campaigned to remove existing Headteacher, Jacky Froggat, over concerns regarding falling standards. She was replaced by Nigel Mountford, who had been the acting head teacher of the Harwich School, Under his leadership the school was transformed into a positive learning atmosphere with a new code of conduct and praise scheme for pupils who perform well, his appointment came just one week after the school was saved from going into special measures, Ofsted reported the school had shown significant improvement.

In 2011 the school relaunched, changing its name from The Harwich School to Harwich and Dovercourt High School Nigel Mountford retired and was succeeded by headteacher Robert Garrett in 2014.

In July 2016 following an Ofsted inspection the school was given a Good rating.

The school was converted to academy status in August 2012, and became a member of the Sigma Multi Academy Trust on 1 June 2017. The school continues to coordinate with Essex County Council for admissions.

== Notable former students ==
- Ivan Henderson - Labour Party politician and former MP for Harwich (1997-2005)

== See also ==
- List of schools in Essex
