= The Sooty Show =

British children's television series (1955–1992)

- The Sooty Show title card (1981–1984)
- Presented by: Harry Corbett (1955–1975); Matthew Corbett (1976–1992)
- Starring: Marjorie Corbett (voice of Soo 1964–1981); Brenda Longman (voice of Soo 1981–1992)
- Composer: Alan Braden
- Country of origin: United Kingdom
- Original language: English
- No. of series: 43
- No. of episodes: 481 (92 missing) (list of episodes)

Production
- Production location: Teddington Studios (Thames series)
- Running time: 10–20 minutes
- Production companies: BBC (1955–1967); Thames Television (1968–1992)

Original release
- Network: BBC/BBC1 (1955–1967); ITV (1968–1981); Children's ITV on ITV (1983–1992)
- Release: 16 January 1955 – 30 November 1992

Related
- Sooty & Co. (1993–1998)

The Sooty Show is a British children's television series, created by Harry Corbett, and produced for the BBC from 1955 to 1967, and then for ITV from 1968 until 1992. The show, part of the Sooty franchise, focuses on the mischievous adventures of the glove puppet character of the same name, alongside his friends Sweep and Soo, and their handler. Between 1955 and 1975, Corbett presented the programme until his retirement, before it was taken over by his son Matthew Corbett. It also co-starred Marjorie Corbett as the voice of Soo from the character's debut in 1964, until her retirement in 1981, whereupon Brenda Longman replaced her.

The show originally focused on a sketch-based format featuring slapstick comedy, music, and stories, along with additional puppet characters, and later the incorporation of a studio audience. In 1981, Matthew changed the format towards a sitcom setting, in which he and the characters lived within a country cottage and engaged in a new adventure in each episode. The new arrangement retained some elements from the original format such as songs, while introducing narration in a number of scenes featuring the puppets only. In both formats, guests are featured in episodes, alongside the involvement of prop items for gunging and making messes of human performers and guest stars.

The Sooty Show proved a success with children's television, due to the popularity of Sooty, spawning additional sequels including Sooty & Co. in 1993, as well as several stage shows, and a spin-off educational series titled Learn With Sooty. The programme itself was later made available on VHS and DVD, featuring episodes from primarily the 1980s to 1990s.

== History ==
The Sooty Show was created by Harry Corbett, a children's entertainer and magician, following the popularity of his puppet character Sooty on children's television and the decision by BBC Television to commission him for several episodes featuring the character. Corbett hosted several episodes for the BBC, originally under the title of Sooty, before later renaming it to the title that would be used throughout its broadcast history, along with creating additional characters that would become key elements to the children's media franchise sharing the character's name. In 1967, Corbett fell into disagreement with BBC producers over the presentation of the programme, and with the decision by Paul Fox, BBC1 controller at that time, to cancel the programme, he signed a deal with ITV to move The Sooty Show to their channel. Production was handled by Thames Television shortly after its return in 1968, with Corbett presenting the programme until he was forced to retire in 1975, with his son Matthew Corbett presenting the programme until its conclusion in 1992, when Thames lost its franchise.

== Format ==
The Sooty Show featured three different formats during its broadcast history: two created by Harry Corbett, the programme's creator; and the third by Harry's son, Matthew Corbett. The first format, used from the programme's premiere in 1955, functioned in the manner of a cartoon short. In this arrangement, Harry would detail a scenario to viewers that Sooty was undertaking, that would often go wrong and cause chaos, often for Harry. The plots devised for these episodes were influenced by societal values, current events and the development of new technologies, tailored towards amusing young children, and made use of slapstick humour, including the use of cream pies and water. As episodes progressed, stories under this format later saw the involvement of Sweep and Soo, whom Harry created to accompany Sooty, alongside other puppet characters.

The second format, devised in the mid-1960s, expanded episodes to consist of a series of sketches involving Sooty and his friends, but with the inclusion of a studio, and a live audience of young children at each filming session. In this arrangement, Harry was able to incorporate additional elements, including music, story-telling, magic tricks and guest stars alongside the comedic sketches. The format was maintained by Harry when the programme moved from the BBC to ITV in 1968, and later by Matthew, upon becoming a regular in 1974, after taking over from his father following his retirement in 1975, though with Harry retaining a guest capacity in episodes.

The third format used by the programme was introduced by Matthew in 1981, later becoming a staple for all future programmes in the Sooty franchise. Under the new format, Matthew discontinued the use of a studio audience and comedic sketches, in lieu of a sitcom format focused on a single misadventure, with himself, Sooty, Sweep and Soo sharing a suburban house together. Elements of the previous format, such as guest stars and music, were retained, with narration added in for scenes focused entirely on the puppets; story-telling was also retained, but phased out over the 1980s. The new format included the use of educational elements in some stories, and the creation of specially designed sets for the puppet characters, which would be later updated and maintained in subsequent programmes in the Sooty franchise – in particular, a bathroom set created for the programme was specially designed so that its miniature taps and shower dispensed running water.

== Cast ==
=== Presenters ===
- Harry Corbett (1955–1975) – The show's first presenter and the creator of Sooty. Corbett ran the programme mostly within a sketch-based format throughout his era, later creating the characters of Sweep and Soo to accompany the show. His most notable contribution to the show, aside from the puppet characters, was the catchphrase he used to conclude an episode's run, which would continue to be used by his successors – "Bye bye, everybody. Bye bye." Harry returned to the programme as a guest star during his son Matthew's era, and was awarded an OBE for his contributions with the programme and characters following his retirement.
- Matthew Corbett (1976–1992) – The show's second presenter. Matthew took over in 1976, having initially worked in children's television, and maintained the same format as his father up until 1981. After the show's format was changed to a sitcom-based arrangement, Matthew transformed himself on screen into a well-meaning father figure, but also a somewhat sarcastic character who was slightly conceited with pomposity and boasting, to complement the mayhem created by Sooty and Sweep.
- Marjorie Corbett (1964–1981) – The first voice of Soo, whom her husband Harry had created as a talking female panda. She remained a part of the show until after the first series of the format change. According to Brenda Longman, who took over the voice of Soo, the reason Marjorie was replaced was because her heavy smoking caused her to be short of breath. It was also felt that she made Soo sound too old.
- Brenda Longman (1981–1992) – The second voice of Soo starting from the second series of the format change, following Marjorie's retirement from the role, who also made frequent guest appearances as various characters within the show's sitcom format. Longman remained with the programme until its conclusion and continued to work with Matthew and his successor Richard Cadell on subsequent sequels of The Sooty Show and other Sooty productions in the same role.

=== Puppet characters ===
- Sooty – A mute yellow male bear, and the protagonist of the show alongside its human presenters. The show introduced his trademark traits of tapping a surface to whisper into the presenter's ear what he wishes to say, owning a magic wand, the use of his magic words "Izzy wizzy, let's get busy!", and his fondness for using a water pistol.
- Sweep – A grey male dog, and Sooty's best friend, who was created in 1957. His trademark voice of bizarre squeaks was achieved by his original puppeteer Leslie Corbett, through a reed from a saxophone in his mouth to create the sounds.
- Soo – A calm and collected female panda with a normal human voice, who was created in 1964. The character's design was towards being a foil for both Sooty and Sweep, but with a motherly-like nature to her personality. She was originally voiced by Harry's wife Marjorie Corbett until 1981, whereupon after the show's format changed, she was voiced by Brenda Longman until the show's conclusion in 1992.
- Butch – A dark brown male dog, like Sweep, but able to talk. Introduced by Harry Corbett in the early 1970s, the character was withdrawn by his son Matthew in 1980, returning to guest star in the role of a villain.
- Mr. Woof – A Yorkshire Terrier who is a friend of Sweep, he barks in communication, eats, and sleeps.
- Ramsbottom – A brown male snake who spoke in a deep Yorkshire accent and had the habit of telling convoluted stories and ditties. The character was created by Harry Corbett but retired by his son Matthew. He was originally voiced by Bill Garrett, the company model and prop maker who used his own strong Yorkshire accent and made the original puppet.
- Little Cousin Scampi – A mute white bear and Sooty's cousin. The character was created by Matthew Corbett and introduced in Series 15 episode of the same name in 1990 and was designed to be a mischievous bear who liked pranks, making inventions, and caring for mice. The character became a regular member of the puppet characters from 1991, and beyond the programme's conclusion in 1992.

== Legacy ==
The Sooty Show proved popular with children and helped to develop the Sooty franchise, culminating in the formation of additional television programmes that would run on the format brought in by Matthew Corbett in the 1980s. After the programme's conclusion, it was followed with a sequel in 1993, titled Sooty & Co.. The programme also spawned an educational spin-off series for young children, titled Learn With Sooty, that was produced for the direct-to-video market between 1989 and 1991, and several stage shows involving the puppets, Matthew, and Connie Creighton. Its early success led to it receiving a short-run comic strip based on the character, for the children's magazine Playhour between 1960 and 1961, drawn by Gordon Hutchings.

Outside the UK, the show was also given international broadcasts in other countries: these included ABC in Australia; TVNZ in New Zealand; and the American Broadcasting Company (ABC) in the United States.

== UK home media releases ==
VHS title	Release date	Episodes
The Adventures of Sooty (VC1049)	28 April 1986	Sleepwalking, Snuffles, The Magic Show, Sooty's Panto
Sooty & Superdog (TV9919)	3 November 1986	All Blocked Up, The Dancer, Superdog
Sooty – Out and About (TV9959)	5 October 1987	Stately Home, Rabbit Trap, Football Crazy
Sooty and Co & Sooty's House (TV8432)	5 October 1987	On the Piste, Down Dog, Marathon, Perfume, Bad Luck, White Lies
Children's Favourites – Volume 2 (TV8011)	1 February 1988	Burglar Box (Compilation VHS with 'Rainbow' and 'Button Moon'.)
Sooty – The Big Surprise (TV8027)	4 April 1988	The Big Surprise, Return of Superdog, Overnight Away
Sooty – Sooty's Time Capsule/Ventriloquism (WP0003)	7 November 1988	Time Capsule, Ventriloquism
The Sooty Christmas Show (TV8041)	7 November 1988	Sooty's Busy Christmas, Hidden Talent
Sooty's Restaurant (TV8055)	6 February 1989	Restaurant, Health Food
Sooty's School Trip (TV8047)	10 April 1989	School Trip, Tap Time, Moving House
Sooty's Stately Home and Other Stories (LL0026)	1 May 1989	Stately Home, Ancestors, Millionaire
Sooty's Magic Lamp and Other Stories (LL0027)	1 May 1989	Sooty's Magic Lamp, Cuddly Toys, Make and Do
Children's Favourites Vol. 3 (LL0032)	1 May 1989	Amateur Dramatics (Compilation VHS with 'Rainbow' and 'Button Moon'.)
Children's Favourites Vol. 4 (LL0033)	1 May 1989	When I Was a Lad (Compilation VHS with 'Rainbow' and 'Button Moon'.)
Children's Summer Stories (TV8060)	5 June 1989	Messing About in Boats (Compilation VHS with 'Rainbow' and 'Button Moon'.)
Sooty's Christmas Party and Other Stories (TV8073)	2 October 1989	Sooty's Christmas Party, Royalty, Get Your Skates on
Children's Favourites: Bedtime Stories (TV8077)	6 November 1989	Star Gazing (Compilation VHS with 'Rainbow' and 'Button Moon'.)
Sooty – Sooty's Favourite Stories (TV8082)	5 February 1990	Radio Control Car, Honking Nose, Sweep's Family
Children's Holiday Favourites (TV8093)	4 June 1990	A Very Special Day (Compilation VHS with 'Rainbow' and 'Rod, Jane and Freddy'.)
Sooty Wants a Pet (TV8098)	4 June 1990	Sooty Wants a Pet, The Unreal Ghostbusters, In Camera
Sooty's Golf Crazy Golf (TV8099)	4 June 1990	Sooty's Golf Crazy Golf, Down Under, Grin and Bear it
Sooty's Bumper Special (TV8112)	10 September 1990	Inventors, Fat and 40, Stay Awake, Nothing Ever Happens, Bowled Over
Sooty and Rainbow (WP0025)	1 October 1990	The Good, The Bad and The Furry (Compilation VHS with 'Rainbow'.)
Children's Club: Children's Favourites (KK0005)	4 February 1991	When I Was a Lad (Compilation VHS with 'Rainbow' and 'Button Moon'.)
Sooty – Sooty's Big Time Video (TV8081)	4 February 1991	Just Not Cricket, Bangers and Smash, Water Sports, Dyb, Dyb Disaster
Sooty Video Fun Pack (TB8001)	5 August 1991	Izzy Wizzy, Love a Duck
Sooty – Little Cousin Scampi and Other Stories (WH1023)	7 October 1991	Little Cousin Scampi, Sticky Situation, Gardeners for Hire
Sooty Video Fun Pack Re-Release (TB0001)	3 February 1992	Izzy Wizzy, Love a Duck
Sooty – Matt Robot and Other Stories (TV8157)	3 February 1992	Matt Robot, Return of Scampi, Car Boot Sale
Sooty – Hair Today and Other Stories (TV8158)	3 February 1992	Hair Today, Derek's Back, Any 5-Year-Old Can Do it
Sooty – Three Men in a Boat and Other Stories (TV8161)	1 June 1992	Three Men in a Boat, Cars, Trains, Boats and Planes, Swinging the Lead
Sooty – Only Joking and Other Stories (TV8162)	1 June 1992	Only Joking, Boarding House, Bored Games
Sooty – What a Load of Rubbish & Collecting (LW0001)	5 October 1992	What a Load of Rubbish, Collecting
The Christmas Collection (TV8165)	5 October 1992	Early Christmas (Compilation VHS with 'Rainbow and 'The Wind in the Willows'.)
My Bumper Christmas Sooty (TV8266)	27 October 1997	A Summertime Christmas, Little Terrors, Sooty's Christmas Party, Sooty's Busy Christmas
Sooty – Biggest Party Video (TV8269)	23 March 1998	Happy Birthday Sooty, Back to Front, Soo's Party Problem, Sweep's Family, Bored Games
Sooty – Wet & Wild Water Fun	9 October 2000	A Very Special Day, Three Men in a Boat, Water Sports
Cult Kids Classics 2	5 March 2001	Superdog (Compilation VHS with 'Jamie and the Magic Torch', 'Danger Mouse', 'Chorlton and the Wheelies', 'Rainbow', and 'Count Duckula'.)
Sweep Superdog	13 August 2001	Superdog and the Comedian, Bouncers, Hot Stuff, Sweep's Family, Honking Nose, Swinging the Lead

DVD title	Release date	Episodes
Cult Kids Classics 2	5 March 2001	Superdog (Compilation DVD with Jamie and the Magic Torch', 'Danger Mouse', 'Chorlton and the Wheelies', 'Rainbow', and 'Count Duckula'.)
Sweep Superdog	13 August 2001	Superdog and the Comedian, Bouncers, Hot Stuff, Sweep's Family, Honking Nose, Swinging the Lead
The Original Sooty Show – Wet & Wild Water Fun	8 April 2002	A Very Special Day, Three Men in a Boat, Water Sports
Classic Kids Hits: from School Disco	8 September 2003	Super Star (Compilation DVD with 'Danger Mouse', 'Rainbow', 'Button Moon', 'Chorlton and the Wheelies', and 'Jamie and the Magic Torch'.)
Sooty – Wet & Wild Water Fun	2 April 2007	A Very Special Day, Three Men in a Boat, Water Sports
The Sooty Show – Izzy Wizzy	7 July 2008	Izzy Wizzy, Little Terrors, Sooty's Magic Lamp
The Sooty Show – Happy Birthday, Sooty	7 July 2008	Happy Birthday, Sooty, Sooty Wants a Pet, Honking Nose
The Sooty Show – Izzy Wizzy Re-Release	19 April 2010	Izzy Wizzy, Little Terrors, Sooty's Magic Lamp
The Sooty Show – Happy Birthday, Sooty Re-Release	19 April 2010	Happy Birthday, Sooty, Sooty Wants a Pet, Honking Nose
Sooty – The Big Surprise	19 April 2010	The Big Surprise, Hidden Talent, Sticky Situation, Little Cousin Scampi, Fanatical Fun
The Sooty Show – Izzy Wizzy Let's Get Busy	13 July 2015	Izzy Wizzy, Little Terrors, Sooty's Magic Lamp
"Spooky Classics Collection"	26 September 2016	Little Terrors (Compilation DVD with 'Danger Mouse' and 'Button Moon')
"Winter Wonders Collection"	7 November 2016	Sooty's Christmas Party, Sooty's Christmas Special (Billy Dainty) (Compilation DVD with 'Rainbow')

Also, in January 2008, a promotional DVD containing 5 early-1980s episodes was distributed by The Times newspaper, for Fremantle Media. The episodes featured were: "Bob a Job"; "Safety First"; "Sleep Walking"; "Connie Comes to Tea"; and "Sooty's Christmas Panto".
