= Sweep (puppet) =

British children's television puppet

Sweep (right) and Sooty

Sweep is a British puppet and television character popular in the United Kingdom, United States, Canada, Australia, Ireland, New Zealand and other countries.

Sweep's squeaking voice
Sweep saying "It was Sooty and Soo's idea" in his squeak voice, demonstrating the rhythm and inflection coming from normal speech.

Sweep is a grey glove puppet dog with long black ears who joined The Sooty Show in 1957, as a friend to fellow puppet Sooty. He is a smart, talented and clever dog with a penchant for bones and sausages. Sweep is notable for his method of communication which consists of a loud high-pitched squeak that gains its inflection from normal speech and its rhythm from the syllables in each word.

The rest of the cast, namely Soo and the presenter, could understand Sweep perfectly, and would (albeit indirectly) translate for the viewer. The sound of Sweep's voice was achieved using "something similar to a saxophone reed". Versions of the puppet later sold as toys had an integral squeaker connected to an air bulb that was squeezed by hand.

Sweep's family first appeared on the Sooty Show in an episode called "Sweep's Family". He has a mother and father; a twin brother, Swoop; two cousins, Swipe and Swap, and another seven brothers in the litter (all of whom look exactly like him, and wear different coloured collars to tell each other apart).

Swipe and Swap are described as Sweep's brothers in the Sooty & Co. episode "Sweep's Family" and the Sooty Heights episode "The Hounds of Music".

== Voice actors ==
- Leslie Corbett - The Sooty Show
- Brian Sandford - The Sooty Show, Sooty & Co., Sooty Heights, Sooty
- Rob Rackstraw - Sooty's Amazing Adventures
- Francis Wright - Sooty
