= Sooty & Co. =

Television series

- Genre: Comedy, adventure
- Created by: Matthew Corbett
- Starring: Matthew Corbett; Brenda Longman; Richard Cadell (1998); Liana Bridges (1998)
- Country of origin: United Kingdom
- Original language: English
- No. of series: 6
- No. of episodes: 90 (list of episodes)

Production
- Running time: 20 minutes
- Production companies: Sooty Films; Granada Television

Original release
- Network: ITV (Children's ITV)
- Release: 6 September 1993 – 14 December 1998

Related
- The Sooty Show (1955–1992); Sooty Heights (1999–2000)

Sooty & Co. is a British children's television series, created and presented by Matthew Corbett, produced by Granada Television, and aired on the Children's ITV block on ITV from 6 September 1993 to 14 December 1998. It is the sequel to the children's programme The Sooty Show, which had concluded in 1992, retaining the sitcom format, and focuses on the misadventures of Sooty, Sweep, Soo, Little Cousin Scampi, and Matthew as they try to run a bric a brac shop in Manchester. Episodes were mainly filmed at Granada's main studio in Manchester and around the city, though some episodes were filmed outside of Manchester, including within Scotland, Ireland, and Spain.

The programme was the last major children's show for Corbett to front before he retired in 1998, having sold the rights to Sooty and the other characters to his successors Richard Cadell and Liana Bridges, guest stars during a number of episodes in the final series. Following its conclusion, Sooty & Co. was succeeded by a new Sooty TV series, entitled Sooty Heights, in 1999.

== Premise ==
Following the conclusion of The Sooty Show, Matthew Corbett sells up the cottage, before buying a bric-a-brac shop in Manchester for himself (which he actually inherited from a distant aunt), and the puppets Sooty, Sweep, Soo and Little Cousin Scampi, to run in which they buy and sell anything and everything, but with little luck. Like its predecessor, each episode sees Matthew, Sooty and the others being involved in hijinks ranging from trying to make money with the shop, or dealing with an issue that they have to sort out, and included moments of singing songs and providing educational insights. In some episodes, the characters travelled outside of Manchester as part of an episode's plot – one example involved the group going off on holiday to Spain.

Brenda Longman, the voice of Soo, was given a physical role in the programme as a regular character named Mo – a market seller to whom Matthew tends to have difficulty in selling anything, and always being made to buy something from her. Alongside the inclusion of a regular character, Sooty & Co. also introduced a new element to the Sooty franchise in the form of a specially designed campervan for Sooty and his friends to travel around in, while a variety of guest stars took part in the programme, including Jack Dee, Paul Zerdin, Harry Hill, Neil Buchanan, and Jim Bowen. In the sixth and final series, as Corbett prepared for his retirement, several episodes featured the appearance of Richard Cadell, Corbett's successor to the rights on Sooty, and Liana Bridges, Cadell's partner in the subsequent programme Sooty Heights, as junior shop staff, mainly to test how they would fare with young viewers after the programme's conclusion.

== History ==
After the rights to the series was sold to a Japanese bank in 1996, the television show did an episode where The Independent said "Sooty has discovered sex". The show received the Best Children's Comedy award at the British Comedy Awards in 1998. Richard Cadell and Liana Bridges appeared on five episodes of the show in 1998 as guest performers.

== Cast ==
- Matthew Corbett – The programme's presenter, who maintained many aspects of The Sooty Show in Sooty & Co, including the sitcom format, various gags, his role as narrator in scenes involving Sooty and/or the other puppets, and his on-screen character.
- Brenda Longman – The voice of Soo on the programme and Mo 'from market'. Prior to Sooty & Co, Longman never assumed a regular character when she was given the physical role as Mo in a number of episodes of The Sooty Show, until Corbett devised the new programme. Longman devised the character to be a con artist and constant source of misery for Corbett whenever she turned up, with a running gag being that she was never sold anything by him and always cost him money instead. Her catchphrase when entering the shop was 'Only me, Mo from market'.
- Connie Creighton - Series regular. Played 'Auntie Connie'. Connie was also the main presenter for the Sooty live shows produced by Corbett around this time. Her character was brought over from The Sooty Show and was often used to fool or deceive Mo's character leading them to quarrel about something trivial.
- Richard Cadell – Guest presenter on the programme during the sixth (and last) series. As Corbett was set for retirement at the conclusion of the programme in 1998, Cadell was invited to take part in the programme in order to gauge the reaction of young viewers, and appeared in a number of episodes during the final series, though had no narrator role, as Corbett handled these.
- Liana Bridges – Guest presenter on the programme during the sixth (and last) series. Like Cadell, she appeared in a number of episodes during the final series.

== Controversy ==
A particular controversial episode of the show was "Soo's Babies", where Soo pretended to be pregnant. It received complaints from viewers, was reported in the national press, and made E4's Top 20 "Most Controversial TV Programmes" at #20. On E4's show, Brenda Longman (who plays 'Mo' and voices 'Soo' in the show), said the idea came about because Matthew tended to write for his daughter.

Matthew stated that he recalled his daughter wandering into his room with a pillow up her jumper, saying she was going to have a baby. He also said how it was a sort of educational piece.

In the same episode, Yvonne (played by Beverly Hills) says she feels she has got the whole of the Manchester Football Team inside her, a joke that could be seen as sexual innuendo. The joke would later be said by Soo. In the show's defence, Longman stated how the show was also watched by parents as well as children, and that there were jokes in it for parents. Uri Geller said the story was played in a 'nice' and 'humorous' way.

Another controversial episode was "Nature's Way?", in which the characters inhale fragrances from aromatherapy bottles. The Independent Television Commission upheld 11 complaints from viewers, including aromatherapists, stating that children could be influenced to copy the behaviour shown in the episode.

== Home media ==
DVD title	Release date	Episodes
Sooty & Co – Sooty's Magic Box Of Tricks: Part 1	2007	Pulling The Wool, Tidy Box, Delgrub, The Stain Remover

VHS title	Release date	Episodes
Sooty & Co – Moving In/Bubble Trouble (VC1332)	21 February 1994	Moving In, Bubble Trouble
Sooty & Co – Scrap Idea/Buddy Jolly (VC1333)	21 February 1994	Scrap Idea, Buddy Jolly
Sooty & Co – Canal Capers/Staff Training (VC1336)	11 July 1994	Canal Capers, Staff Training
Sooty & Co – Sooty's Magic Solutions/New Friends (VC1337)	11 July 1994	Sooty's Magic Solutions, New Friends
Sooty & Co – Splashing Out/Soo to the Rescue (VC1338)	10 October 1994	Splashing Out, Soo to the Rescue
Sooty & Co – World Of Fun/Clocks Galore (VC1339)	10 October 1994	World Of Fun, Clocks Galore
Sooty & Co – Bun Fight (WP0032)	3 October 1994	Bun Fight
Sooty & Co – Camping Out and Other Stories (VC1383)	1 May 1995	A Magical Voice, Bun Fight, Camping Out
My Little Sooty – Moving In (ML0010)	2 September 1996	Moving In
Sooty Club – Bubble Trouble (SFC1416)	2 September 1996	Bubble Trouble
Sooty – Sooty's Elastic Tricks and Other Stories (VC1414)	11 March 1996	Soo's Spring Cleaning, Sooty's Elastic Tricks, Home Alone Sweep
Sooty – Speedy Sweep and Other Stories (VC1419)	6 May 1996	Speedy Sweep, Sweep's Little Accident, Breakdown
My Bumper Sooty – Little Shop Of Mischief (VC1441)	12 May 1997	Soo's Babies, Fun Park, Shop-Keeping, Sweep's Family, Dog Trouble
Sooty & Co – An Izzy Wizzy Christmas (GV0091)	9 November 1998	Sooty's Christmas Panto, The Gift, World Of Fun, Bun Fight
Sooty & Co – Animal Magic (GV0183)	28 February 2000	Pony and Trap, Kennels, Chaffinch
Sooty & Co – Sooty's Magic Box Of Tricks (GV0205)	21 August 2000	Splashing Out, Sooty's Magic Solutions, The Stain Remover, Talent Night, Twins, Moose Loose in the House, Now You See Him, Pulling The Wool, Tidy Box, Delgrub
