= Sooty (2001 TV series) =

British children's television series

- Genre: Comedy
- Composers: Mr. Miller & Mr. Porter
- Country of origin: United Kingdom
- Original language: English
- No. of series: 3
- No. of episodes: 33

Production
- Running time: 20 Minutes (series 1); 15 Minutes (series 2–3)
- Production companies: Sooty Limited; Granada Kids

Original release
- Network: ITV (CITV)
- Release: 5 November 2001 – 6 January 2004

Related
- Sooty Heights (1999–2000); Sooty (2011–2018)

Sooty is a British children's television series, created and presented by Richard Cadell, and premiered on CITV on 5 November 2001, running for three series. The programme is the fourth programme in the franchise of the same name, and replaced Sooty Heights, with Cadell supported by co-presenter Vicki Lee Taylor, and Brenda Longman during the first series, and Sheila Clark for the remaining series. The programme focuses on the exploits of the titular character and his puppet friends in their running of the hotel, and features many elements used in previous programmes. The show saw the return of a puppet character from the franchise, as well as the creation of a new character.

The programme was originally produced by Gullane Entertainment, before the production company was bought up by HIT Entertainment following the first series. HIT's decision to cut costs and make changes to the programme, including using new puppets, and the replacement of Soo's long term voice artist Brenda Longman, resulted in several members of production leaving the programme, including Vicki Lee Taylor and Sooty being eventually cancelled in January 2004 for many reason's including falling viewing figures. In conclusion, Cadell eventually bought the rights to Sooty and it's franchise and Longman was immediately asked back to continue her role as Soo. After a new pilot aired in 2009, a new series was commissioned in 2011 under the same name, Sooty. This time, Richard, Sooty, Sweep and Soo quit running the hotel and began running a holiday park instead.

== Premise ==
Sooty focuses on the misadventures of the titular character of the programme and his friends – Sweep, Soo, and Little Cousin Scampi – managing a hotel alongside their close friends Richard Cadell and Vicki Lee Taylor. Along with them, the group are also joined by Butch – another dog whom the group have been with before, who attempts various jobs that the group find themselves assigning to him – and Miki – a Brazilian cat who joins the hotel as its chef. The programme functions on the same format as Sooty Heights and previous programmes in the Sooty franchise, including slapstick humour, guest stars, and music and songs.

== Cast ==
- Richard Cadell – presenter
- Vicki Lee Taylor – co-presenter
- Sooty – a mute yellow bear who is the protagonist of the show. He owns a magic wand whose power is invoked using the words "Izzy wizzy, let's get busy".
- Sweep – a dim-witted grey dog with a penchant for bones and sausages. He communicates using bizarre squeaks.
- Soo – a calm and collected female panda who acts as the foil for both Sooty and Sweep and usually wears a red skirt. She was voiced by her long-time voice actor Brenda Longman in Series 1, but was replaced with Sheila Clark for Season 2 and 3.
- Little Cousin Scampi – Sooty's cousin, who is very cheeky and a serial troublemaker. He wears a navy-blue school uniform and, like Sooty, is mute. However, in this show he is rarely seen.
- Butch The Dog – a bull dog who often visits the hotel.
- Miki – a Brazilian cat who is also the hotel's chef. She is a new character made especially for this show.

== Episodes ==
=== Series 1 (2001) ===
1. "All New Sooty" (5 November 2001)
2. "A New Arrival" (6 November 2001)
3. "Sci Fi Sooty" (7 November 2001)
4. "It's My Party" (8 November 2001)
5. "Sweep Asleep" (9 November 2001)
6. "Sad Sad Sooty" (12 November 2001)
7. "It's a Dog's Life" (13 November 2001)
8. "Practice Makes Perfect" (14 November 2001)
9. "Night of a Thousand Bears" (15 November 2001)
10. "You Don't Scare Me" (16 November 2001)
11. "A Cat and Dog Thing" (19 November 2001)
12. "Favourite Things" (20 November 2001)
13. "Santa's Back" (21 November 2001)

=== Series 2 (2002) ===
1. "Robo Richard" (15 October 2002)
2. "The Mysterious Visitor" (22 October 2002)
3. "Sooty's Pet" - (29 October 2002)
4. "Superheroes" (5 November 2002)
5. "Sooty in Charge" (12 November 2002)
6. "Sooty's Magic Garden" (19 November 2002)
7. "The New Gang" (26 November 2002)
8. "The Little Big People" (3 December 2002)
9. "Digging for Dinosaurs" (10 December 2002)
10. "Best Friends" (17 December 2002)

=== Series 3 (2003–2004) ===
All episodes were filmed and produced in 2002.

1. "Sooty's Baby" (24 July 2003)
2. "Double Trouble" (31 July 2003)
3. "Flying Fun" (07 August 2003)
4. "Sooty at the Seaside" (14 August 2003)
5. "Treasure Hunt" (21 August 2003)
6. "Water, Water Everywhere" (28 August 2003)
7. "Sooty's Ghost" (20 January 2004)
8. "Let's Get Camping" (27 January 2004)
9. "Sooty the Scientist"
10. "Keep Fit Sooty"
