= Vicki Lee Taylor =

British actress

- Born: 10 August 1984 (age 42); Grimsby, Lincolnshire, England, UK
- Occupations: Actress and presenter
- Website: Official website

Vicki Lee Taylor (born 10 August 1984) is an English theatre and television actress and television presenter.

Taylor was born in Grimsby, Lincolnshire, and at the age of twelve appeared in the leading role of Emma in Listen to the Wind (King's Head Theatre, London) and recorded the cast album at the Abbey Road Studios. This secured her a national tour of Enid Blyton’s The Famous Five, playing tomboy George.

Her first notable television appearance was the role of Dino in the series The Queen's Nose. Whilst studying for her GCSE exams she also appeared in the lead role of Little Meg in both popular series of Big Meg, Little Meg and as the guest lead Deborah for several episodes of Heartbeat.

Taylor also appeared as the co-presenter on Sooty (ITV) from 2001 to 2004, recording three series.

In addition to acting, Taylor has won awards for singing and dancing (including a guest appearance on the BBC series Star for a Night). She has appeared in numerous pantomimes, including Snow White (Cardiff) and Dick Whittington (Leamington Spa) and as Cinderella (High Wycombe). In 2008, she was in The Witches of Eastwick UK Tour with Marti Pellow. In 2013 she played the role of Maggie Winslow in the West End revival of A Chorus Line at the London Palladium.

She followed this by appearing as Daisy Gamble at the Union Theatre, London, in On a Clear Day You Can See Forever.
