= Harry Corbett =

English magician and puppeteer (1918–1989)

Harry Corbett OBE
- Born: 28 January 1918; Bradford, West Riding of Yorkshire, England
- Died: 17 August 1989 (aged 71); Weymouth, Dorset, England
- Occupations: Magician; puppeteer; television presenter
- Years active: 1940s–1981
- Spouse: Marjorie Hodgson (m. 1944)
- Children: 2, including Matthew Corbett
- Family: Harry Ramsden (uncle)

Harry Corbett OBE (28 January 1918 – 17 August 1989) was an English magician, puppeteer and television presenter. He was best known as the creator of the glove puppet character Sooty in 1952.

== Biography ==
Corbett was born on 28 January 1918 in Bradford, West Riding of Yorkshire, to James W. Corbett, a coal miner, and his wife Florence, née Ramsden. He had a younger brother, Les, a saxophonist, with whom he played duets, and who would sometimes appear on The Sooty Show. Deafness in one ear precluded him from pursuing his musical ambitions to become a concert pianist, although he played the piano in the Guiseley fish and chip restaurant owned by his mother's brother Harry Ramsden. His parents had a fish and chip business in Guiseley called Springfield, which remains open and is now known as Springfield Fisheries. He worked as an engineer with Leeds City Council prior to his time in show business.

He married Marjorie ('Tobes') Hodgson in 1944. They lived in the Dorset village of Child Okeford for most of their married life. Their son David was born in 1947 followed in 1948 by Peter, known professionally as Matthew Corbett. The same year, in order to entertain his children while on holiday in Blackpool, he bought the original yellow bear glove puppet, then called Teddy, in a novelty shop on the end of the resort's North Pier for seven shillings and six pence (7s/6d) (which would become 37½p after decimalisation, not allowing for inflation). "Even now I can't tell you exactly what it was about him," he later recalled, "but I just couldn't leave him."

His first appearance with the silent Sooty was in a 1952 BBC TV show, Talent Night. He was given a part in Peter Butterworth's TV show Saturday Special. Sooty was such a hit that the BBC offered Corbett six programs at 12 guineas each. In a 1970 interview, Corbett recalled the conversation he had with his wife Marjorie about his next steps:

'"Well, lass... what's it to be?" '"Well, lad," she replied, "it's now or never. Best take the plunge." "So I did. I threw up my job. We changed Teddy's appearance, gave him black ears, and called him Sooty."

Sooty soon had his own show which combined music, simple magic tricks with slapstick comedy in which Sooty usually poured liquid over or attacked Corbett. On 3 September 1996, both appeared on a 26p Royal Mail postage stamp, with Sooty brandishing a hammer.

Sooty and Corbett were also regularly featured on the Mickey Mouse Club in the United States in the mid-to-late 1950s.

In early 1968, producers at the BBC told Corbett that, while he should remain as puppeteer, an actor should interact with Sooty. Corbett declared this to be "a horrible American idea". Instead, he moved the show to commercial television.

After he suffered a heart attack at Christmas 1975, his younger son, Peter (Matthew), took over. He continued to make occasional appearances on The Sooty Show for several years with his son. Corbett continued his one-man stage show after he gave up his television appearances, and he died in his sleep on 17 August 1989, after playing to a capacity audience at Weymouth Pavilion in Weymouth, Dorset.

== Personal life ==
In 1988, Corbett was the subject of This Is Your Life, commemorating forty years in the entertainment industry and the debut of Sooty.

He was a Freemason under the jurisdiction of the United Grand Lodge of England. He was initiated in 1951 in Chevin Lodge No. 6848 in West Yorkshire. He became the lodge organist. The lodge still meets at Otley.

== Catchphrases ==
- "Izzy wizzy, let's get busy"
- "Bye bye everybody! Bye bye!"
- "Bye bye everyone! Bye bye!"

== OBE ==
Corbett was awarded the OBE "for charitable services" on 1 January 1976. The Steptoe and Son actor Harry H. Corbett received the same award on the same day.

== Bibliography ==
- Tibballs, Geoff (1990). The Secret Life of Sooty. Letchworth, UK: Ringpress Books. ISBN 0-948955-56-2.
- Harry Corbett at IMDb
