= Matthew Corbett =

English magician and puppeteer (born 1948)

- Born: Peter Graham Corbett; 28 March 1948 (age 78); Guiseley, West Yorkshire, England
- Occupations: Actor; comedian; magician; puppeteer; singer; television presenter; writer
- Known for: Host of The Sooty Show, Sooty & Co.
- Spouse: Sallie Corbett
- Children: 3
- Father: Harry Corbett

Matthew Corbett (born Peter Graham Corbett on 28 March 1948) is an English former actor, singer, comedian, magician, puppeteer, television presenter, and writer, best known for presenting The Sooty Show and later Sooty and Co. He is the son of Sooty's creator, Harry Corbett, and took over the show from his father in 1976. He retired in 1998.

== Career ==
Peter Graham Corbett was born in Guiseley, West Riding of Yorkshire, on 28 March 1948. In the late 1960s he had to choose another name when joining the performing arts trade union Equity, as there was already a Peter Corbett registered. He kept his surname and chose to go by the first name Matthew, retaining the name throughout his television career.

Corbett appeared in the Doctor Who serial The Dæmons (1971) as a character called Jones and was a regular performer in the Thames Television children's show Rainbow, where he sang and performed and wrote with Rod Burton and Jane Tucker as Rod, Matt and Jane; after he left they eventually became Rod, Jane and Freddy.

In 1976, Corbett left Rainbow to take over The Sooty Show from his father Harry, who was retiring (he made a special guest appearance on Rainbow with Sooty in the episodes "1000th Birthday Party" and "The VIP"). Corbett retired in 1998 after 22 years, and chose Richard Cadell to replace him.

In January 2008, he reappeared on television, presenting Locks and Quays, a regional interest programme shown in the ITV Granada area (North West England), featuring a journey from the east to the west coast of England, along waterways such as the Humber estuary, the Aire and Calder Navigation and the Leeds and Liverpool Canal.

On Sooty's 60th birthday in 2012, he said that the bear was "in, or should I say on, the right hands".

== Personal life ==
Corbett's great-uncle was the fish and chip shop chain owner Harry Ramsden.

Corbett contracted COVID-19 in 2020. He nearly died after he contracted pneumonia, which led to atrial fibrillation and had to spend 10 days in intensive care.

As of 2020, he stated he and his wife planned to reside in a retirement village in Horsham, West Sussex.

== Filmography ==
| Year | Title | Role | Notes |
|---|---|---|---|
| 1971 | Doctor Who | Jones | Episode: The Dæmons |
| 1971–1992 | The Sooty Show | Himself/Presenter | 127 episodes; also writer |
| 1972 | Pardon My Genie | Waiter | 1 episode |
| 1974–1976, 1986, 1990 | Rainbow | Himself | 148 episodes (Main) 2 episodes (Guest) |
| 1993–1998 | Sooty & Co. | Himself/Presenter | 90 episodes; also writer and producer |
| 1998 | Blue Heelers | Dion Cameron | 1 episode |
| 2011 | Sooty | Himself | 1 episode |
