= Richard Cadell =

British entertainer (born 1968)

- Cadell with Sooty in 2014
- Born: 23 March 1968 (age 58); Leicester, Leicestershire, England
- Occupations: Illusionist; puppeteer; screenwriter; TV presenter
- Relatives: Helen Pearson (sister)
- Website: www.thesootyshow.co.uk

Richard Cadell (born 23 March 1968) is a British illusionist, puppeteer, actor, screenwriter & U.K Showman. best known for being the in-vision presenter and the hand of puppet Sooty since succeeding Matthew Corbett in 1998.

== Biography ==
In June 2008 (Sooty's 60th Anniversary), Richard, together with his brother David, reportedly paid close to £1 million for the global rights for the Sooty brand through their new company, Cadells Ltd. As well as annually touring with live shows, Cadell is credited as the co-writer and executive producer of the Sooty television series that was transmitted daily on ITVBe.

Cadell's involvement with Sooty began with a guest appearance on a Christmas episode of The Sooty Show in 1985; then in the last series of Sooty & Co., he and Liana Bridges joined the cast as employees of the titular store.

He is a gold star member of The Magic Circle and past president of the British section of the International Brotherhood of Magicians. He once owned Brean Leisure Park in the coastal village of Brean in Burnham-on-Sea, Somerset, from 2002–2014. In January 2008, he appeared in The Convention Crasher. He also works as a consultant for TV and stage productions.
