= 1998 in British television =

This is a list of British television related events from 1998.

== Events ==
=== January ===
- 1 January – The network television premiere on BBC One of Robert Zemekis's 1994 blockbuster film Forrest Gump, starring Tom Hanks.
- 3 January
  - The BBC pulls an edition of Noel's House Party at the last minute following a disagreement between Noel Edmonds and the BBC over the quality of the programme and a reduction of its budget. A compilation show from the previous series is repeated in its place.
  - The US supernatural series Buffy the Vampire Slayer makes its UK debut on Sky One; it stars Sarah Michelle Gellar as the titular character.
- 6 January – The BBC and ITV agree their scheduling arrangements for the 1998 World Cup, which will see both England and Scotland's opening matches airing on BBC One, while each nation's second group match will air on ITV.
- 7 January – The BBC confirms that Helen Rollason will return to television to present weekend sports bulletins for BBC One and BBC Two following treatment for colon cancer.
- 8 January
  - ITV airs the docudrama Miracle at Sea: The Rescue of Tony Bullimore which reconstructs the events of yachtsman Tony Bullimore's dramatic rescue after his boat capsized during the 1996 Vendée Globe yacht race.
  - The US sitcom Veronica's Closet makes its UK debut on Sky One; it stars Kirstie Alley.
- 9 January
  - Michael Parkinson returns to television with a new series of Parkinson on BBC One. Guests on the first edition are Sir Anthony Hopkins, Barry Manilow and Paul Merton.
  - Channel 5 signs a deal with Buena Vista Entertainment to air some of its films. This will include the network television premiere of The Rock, starring Nicolas Cage and Sean Connery.
- 12 January
  - Location filming begins for a one-off episode of the Australian soap Home and Away set in Ironbridge, Shropshire. This is the first time the soap has filmed an episode overseas. The storyline, which will air later in the year, sees Irene Roberts (Lynne McGranger) arrive in the UK to help Selina Roberts (Tempany Deckert), who is recovering from a bout of malaria. Selina is also reunited with her on screen fiancé, Steven Matheson (Adam Willits).
  - The 1996 UTV logos are supplemented with a set of idents featuring people playing the UTV jingle on various musical instruments.
  - Debut on BBC Two of the comedy sketch show Goodness Gracious Me, starring Sanjeev Bhaskar, Meera Syal, Kulvinder Ghir and Nina Wadia.
- 13 January – Debut of the docusoap The Cruise on BBC One.
- 14 January
  - Channel 4 airs the 2000th episode of its long-running soap Brookside.
  - Debut of ITV Nightscreen, which is shown during the early hours of the morning.
- 17 January – Media sources report the arrival of a new EastEnders family, the Di Marcos, who will make their first appearance later in the month and set up an Italian restaurant in Albert Square. The majority of the family are written out of the soap two years later.
- 21 January – The former Conservative MP Rupert Allason loses a libel action against BBC Worldwide and Hat Trick Productions over comments made in a 1996 book based on the satirical series Have I Got News for You. A paragraph in Have I Got 1997 for You had noted "...given Mr Allason's fondness for pursuing libel actions, there are also excellent legal reasons for not referring to him as a conniving little shit".
- 24 January – ITV airs the first episode of Ice Warriors, a spin-off from Gladiators, but the series is not a success and is axed after nine episodes with the last one airing on 21 March.
- 25–26 January – Channel 4's coverage of American football comes to an end with its broadcast of the 1998 Super Bowl.
- 26 January – Hayley Patterson, British soap's first transgender character, is first seen in Coronation Street. Hayley, played by Julie Hesmondhalgh, is a regular in the series for sixteen years and helps to change public attitudes towards transgender issues. The character is killed off in a dramatic and emotional right to die storyline in January 2014 after Hesmondhalgh decides to leave the show.
- 30 January – The Weather Channel closes in the UK after fewer than 18 months on the air, owing to low viewership. Rival weather station The Weather Network also closes its UK operation around the same time.

=== February ===
- 4 February – Debut of The Pepsi Chart Show on Channel 5. Initially presented by Rhona Mitra and Eddy Temple-Morris, the show is intended as a stablemate to the Pepsi Chart that airs across commercial radio. It becomes one of the channel's most watched programmes, but has difficulty attracting some of the bigger acts of the day.
- 7–22 February – The BBC provides coverage of the 1998 Winter Olympic Games from Japan. Due to the time difference, live coverage is limited with little action shown, especially during the second week of the Games.
- 8 February – Debut on ITV of My Kind of Music, hosted by Michael Barrymore.
- 15 February – The final Screen One drama is broadcast on BBC One with Our Boy, starring Pauline Quirke and Ray Winstone.
- 16 February
  - Teletubbies begins airing in Australia on ABC.
  - The game show Wipeout is relaunched as a daytime series on BBC One with Bob Monkhouse succeeding Paul Daniels as host.
- 17 February – The Central discussion series Central Weekend is criticised by the Independent Television Commission after an elderly couple complained about an item on the show's 9 January edition that included a discussion about the size of male genitalia.
- 20 February – Debut on BBC Two of Robot Wars, presented by Jeremy Clarkson and later Craig Charles.
- 27 February – Castle Transmission International is confirmed as the supplier of the BBC's Digital Terrestrial Television Service and says it will invest £100 million in broadcast capacity.
- February – CNBC Europe merges with European Business News, upon which the channel is officially known as "CNBC Europe – A Service of NBC and Dow Jones".
- February – Middlesbrough Football Club launches Boro TV, and becomes the first football club in the world to launch their own dedicated TV channel.

=== March ===
- 1 March – Positions for BBC Governors are advertised for the first time in the Sunday newspapers.
- 2 March – Channel 5 begins a rerun of the 1980s' Australian soap Sons and Daughters. This is the series first networked broadcast as its previous run on ITV had varied from region to region.
- 4 March – Kate Winslet, star of Titanic, appears as a guest on Celebrity Ready Steady Cook with former Casualty actor Gray O'Brien.
- 6 March
  - Debut on ITV of Airline, a brand new six-part fly-on-the-wall documentary series, produced by London Weekend Television narrated by Charlie Higson, that highlights the daily happenings of the passengers, ground workers and flight crew of Britannia Airways. From the second series, the show switches its attention to EasyJet.
  - Central Weekend is briefly taken off the air when a member of the audience becomes aggressive during a discussion about women's football.
- 9 March – The name Tyne Tees Television is brought back to ITV viewers in the North East of England, having been rebranded as Channel 3 North East two years earlier.
- 14 March – Debut of the Saturday morning children's series Diggit on ITV.
- 15 March – ITV airs a special one-off edition of Sunday Night at the London Palladium to celebrate Bruce Forsyth's 70th birthday. It includes appearances by Diana Ross and Joe Longthorne.
- 16 March – Teletubbies goes on the air in New Zealand on TV3.
- 19 March – The BBC signs a deal with Discovery Communications that will allow the two to collaborate on the production of nature programming.
- 20 March – The 9:25am slot on ITV that has typically been used to broadcast gameshows since 1987 is used for that genre for the final time, with the talk show Vanessa set to take over the slot from the following week. On the same morning, the final edition of The Time, The Place is aired on ITV after just over a decade.
- 21 March – BBC Two airs Richard Eyre's film version of his Royal National Theatre production of King Lear, starring Ian Holm in the eponymous role, as well as Barbara Flynn, Amanda Redman and Victoria Hamilton as Lear's daughters.
- 28 March
  - The US adult animated series South Park makes its UK debut on Sky One.
  - Debut on BBC One of the National Lottery game show Big Ticket, presented by Anthea Turner and Patrick Kielty, which is the first British game show to offer a six figure cash prize with a jackpot of £100,000. Despite much publicity for the series, it is not a success and its final episode airs on 11 July.
- 29 March
  - BBC America launches in the US.
  - An episode of Coronation Street, in which the character Deirdre Rachid is jailed for mortgage and credit card fraud, is watched by 16.5 million viewers, giving the soap its highest Sunday viewing figures since the weekend episode was added in 1996. The crimes having been committed by her lover, Jon Lindsay, Deirdre's wrongful conviction sparks a public outcry. Her case is championed by national newspapers and even Prime Minister Tony Blair offers to refer the conviction to Home Secretary Jack Straw.
- 31 March – CMT Europe ceases broadcasting.

=== April ===
- 1 April – Episode 2965 of Neighbours airs on BBC One; it sees Anne Haddy make her final appearance as matriarch Helen Daniels, the character having been killed off. The episode aired in Australia on 17 October 1997. Haddy, the soap's longest serving cast member at the time of her departure, dies herself in June 1999.
- 3 April – The Children's Channel ceases broadcasting in the UK after 14 years.
- 4 April – After just nine shows, Ice Warriors is axed by ITV owing to poor ratings and the show itself is not recommissioned for a second series.
- 6 April
  - Cable and Wireless viewers see the Nordic version of The Children's Channel due to a pre-agreed contract signed some years before to air The Children's Channel in Scandinavia. Flextech creates an advertisement-free version known as TCC Nordic to fulfil this requirement.
  - Teletubbies starts airing in the US on PBS as part of the PTV Park block.
- 8 April – The military science-fiction series Stargate SG-1 makes its debut on Sky One, beginning with a special two-hour pilot episode.
- 10 April
  - Progress in Northern Ireland after overnight talks as the final draft of a Good Friday Agreement is almost ready for signature. At about 5:30pm, BBC Two drops its scheduled programmes in the late afternoon to cover developments picking up in the middle of a joint press conference at Castle Buildings in Stormont Estate by the Prime Ministers Tony Blair and Bertie Ahern.
  - After 13 years with EastEnders, Gillian Taylforth makes her final regular appearance as Kathy Beale with the show airing a one-hour special to coincide with her departure.
  - BBC One airs a two-part adaptation of the 1994 Minette Walters crime novel The Scold's Bridle, starring Miranda Richardson, Siân Phillips, Virginia McKenna and Trudie Styler. The second part is aired on 11 April.
- 12 April – Debut on Channel 4 of the engineering competition Scrapheap Challenge, presented by Robert Llewellyn.
- 13 April – Channel 4 premieres the 1994 animated film The Pagemaster starring Macaulay Culkin, Christopher Lloyd, Patrick Stewart & Whoopi Goldberg.
- 16 April – CITV is scheduled to air the tenth episode of ReBoot's third series. However, the episode is not broadcast and Timmy Towers is shown instead.
- 17 April – Coronation Street character Deirdre Rachid is freed from prison after her lover Jon Lindsay is exposed as a bigamist. Four separate tabloid newspapers subsequently claim victory in securing her release, but the soap's producers say they always planned for the jail storyline to conclude after three weeks.
- 21 April – Magdalen College, Oxford wins the 1997–98 series of University Challenge on BBC Two, beating Birkbeck, University of London 225–195.
- 27 April
  - ITV airs the final episode of the children's programme Tots TV.
  - Kevin Lloyd, who has played Tosh Lines in The Bill since 1988, is dismissed from the role by ITV owing to his alcoholism. He dies at the age of 49 within a week.
- 28 April – Debut of Open House with Gloria Hunniford on Channel 5.
- April – The cable and satellite channel TV Travel Shop launches.

=== May ===
- 1 May – The four individual segments of Granada Good Life are merged into a single channel and relaunched as Granada Breeze.
- 2 May – The US teen drama series Dawson's Creek makes its UK debut on Channel 4.
- 3 May – Sky One airs the 200th episode of The Simpsons, featuring the Irish rock band U2.
- 9 May – The 43rd Eurovision Song Contest is held at the National Indoor Arena in Birmingham. The contest is presented by Terry Wogan and Ulrika Jonsson, and won by Israel's Dana International singing "Diva".
- 15 May – ITV announces that ITV2, a new digital terrestrial channel scheduled for launch later in the year, will be aimed at a younger and lighter audience, with an emphasis on male viewers.
- 16 May – Debut on ITV of the stunts and dares series Don't Try This at Home!, presented by Darren Day and Davina McCall, with Paul Hendy and Kate Thornton in supporting roles.
- 18 May – The British Academy Television Awards are awarded in a separate ceremony to the British Academy Film Awards for the first time.
- 20 May – BBC One airs Episode 3000 of Neighbours.
- 25 May – Labour MP George Galloway demands an investigation into an edition of Panorama aired on 21 May, which he describes as "racist". The edition had focused on two British nurses accused of the murder of Yvonne Gilford, a colleague with whom they worked in Saudi Arabia, and included a reconstruction of the two women being interrogated by Saudi Police. Galloway, himself accused of racism and antisemitism, describes the programme as "tabloid television at its worst".
- 26 May – CITV is relaunched with a new logo as well as the revival of in-vision continuity, introducing Stephen Mulhern and Danielle Nicholls as regular presenters.
- 28 May – Channel 4 is censured by the Broadcasting Standards Commission for an episode of the series TV Dinners in which a woman's afterbirth was served up to friends and relatives as pâté. Several viewers, including MP Kevin McNamara, complained about the programme, shown in February, which the Commission deemed had broken a taboo and "would have been disagreeable to many".
- 30 May – BBC One airs The Bee Gees: One Night Only, a concert recorded in Las Vegas by them in 1997.
- 31 May – Sky Scottish closes after 19 months on the air, having failed to meet its financial targets.

=== June ===
- 1 June – Wheel of Fortune returns to ITV for its tenth series in which John Leslie takes over as host from Bradley Walsh.
- 3 June
  - The Big Breakfast presenter Denise van Outen apologises for taking an ashtray and tissue box holder from Buckingham Palace. She took the items while attending a royal reception two days earlier, but returns them with a note of apology following criticism in the press.
  - The US comedy-drama series Ally McBeal makes its UK debut on Channel 4.
- 5 June – The BBC signs a deal with BSkyB to make BBC channels available through Sky Digital when it is launched later in the year.
- 7 June – To mark the tenth anniversary of the death of Russell Harty, BBC Two airs You Are, Are You Not, Russell Harty?, a documentary paying tribute to the chat show presenter.
- 9 June
  - Film critic and host of The Film Programme Barry Norman announces he will leave the BBC after 25 years to join BSkyB. He will leave Film 98 at the end of its current run and join Sky in September.
  - The Bill episode The People Person is aired as a tribute to Kevin Lloyd, who died on 2 May.
- 10 June – The BBC switches on its digital signal, doing so to coincide with the start of the 1998 FIFA World Cup. The technology will be showcased at a number of public venues over the Summer before the launch of the BBC's first digital television channel, BBC Choice, in the Autumn.
- 10 June–12 July – The BBC and ITV show live coverage of the 1998 FIFA World Cup.
- 11 June – Blue Peter presenters Katy Hill and Richard Bacon bury a time capsule containing various items associated with the show in the foundations of the Millennium Dome. It will be opened in 2050.
- 13 June
  - Jason Searle wins the ninth series of Stars in Their Eyes on ITV, performing as Neil Diamond.
  - Channel 4 airs the documentary The Fear of God: 25 Years of The Exorcist, written and presented by film critic Mark Kermode. At the time of its broadcast, the film is still banned on video by the British Board of Film Classification in the UK.
- 15 June – Debut on Channel 4 of Watercolour Challenge, presented by Hannah Gordon.
- 21 June – The final Screen Two broadcast takes place. The strand ends after 13 years as the BBC moves its attentions away from single dramas to focus production on series and serials.
- 25 June – The final episode of BBC One's The Human Body is the first British television programme to show the final moments of a cancer patient. 63-year-old Herbert Mower, who died the previous year, had given permission for his death to be recorded for the series.
- 26 June – Launch of the music channel Kiss TV.

=== July ===
- 1 July
  - Flextech and UKTV have signed a deal with BSkyB that will see their channels carried on BSkyB's new digital satellite service when it is launched.
  - BBC One shows highlights of the Diana, Princess of Wales Tribute Concert, held at Althorp Park on 27 June.
- 3 July – The chat show So Graham Norton makes its debut on Channel 4.
- 10 July
  - BBC Chairman Sir Christopher Bland officially opens the BBC News Centre.
  - BBC One airs the first of three bitesize episodes of EastEnders to coincide with the 1998 World Cup Final; they see some characters travelling to Paris for the final. Subsequent episodes are aired on 11 and 12 July.
  - The US animated series South Park makes its UK terrestrial debut on Channel 4.
- 28 July
  - British Digital Broadcasting rebrand as ONdigital.
  - Debut on BBC One of the police detective series Maisie Raine, starring Pauline Quirke as the titular character.
- 29 July – The final edition of Telly Addicts is broadcast on BBC One after 13 years; it is axed due to falling ratings.

=== August ===
- 10 August
  - Test runs begin for the impending launch of Sky Sports News.
  - The Independent Television Commission upholds a viewer's complaint after a member of the Irish girl group B*Witched used the phrase "feck off" during a live interview on children's channel Nickelodeon on 13 May.
- 12 August – BBC Two announces plans for an evening of programmes dedicated to the Helen Fielding novel Bridget Jones's Diary and issues raised in the book for later in the year.
- 15 August – On the first day of the 1998–99 football season, the first edition of an afternoon-long continuous football news, scores and results programme Soccer Saturday is broadcast on Sky Sports. It replaces Sports Saturday which had featured action from a variety of different sports and had only focussed on football from around 4.30pm.
- 19 August – It is reported that talk show host Vanessa Feltz has been sacked by Anglia because of her "unreal" demands to have her wages doubled to £2.75 million.
- 24 August – Channel 5 is reprimanded by the Independent Television Commission for showing an advert during its soap Family Affairs after both featured the same actor. The advert for McDonald's, aired on 18 May, featured actor Stephen Hoyle, who plays Liam Tripp in the series. The ITC has strict rules governing the separation of television programmes and adverts and after two viewers complained about the incident rules that Channel 5 had breached its regulations.
- 27 August – Vanessa Feltz signs an exclusive two-year contract with the BBC.
- 28 August – The satellite channel Bravo launches The Doll's House, an online series enabling internet users to observe the lives of four women living in a house in London. The women have been selected from 250 applicants to live rent free in the house for six months with weekly highlights of their activities being aired on the channel's men's magazine The Basement. The project, inspired by JenniCam, a US site established by Jennifer Ringley, follows an experiment by Bravo earlier in the year where cameras chronicled the life of actress Sara West over three months. The Doll's House later attracts some media attention after one of the housemates sleeps with a male partner, unaware they are both on camera at the time.
- 29 August
  - SMTV Live makes its debut as ITV's Saturday morning children's programme. Hosted by Ant & Dec alongside Cat Deeley, it replaces Scratchy & Co
  - The music series CD:UK makes its debut on ITV; it airs immediately after SMTV Live and is also presented by Ant & Dec with Cat Deeley.
  - ITV airs the pilot episode of the talent show Give Your Mate a Break, hosted by John Leslie.
- August – The BBC's domestic television channels become available on Sky Digital's satellite service. An unintended consequence of this is that people in the rest of Europe can now watch BBC One and Two using viewing cards from the UK (as the signal is encrypted). This applies even within the UK: people in England can now watch BBC channels from Scotland, Wales and Northern Ireland and vice versa.

=== September ===
- 1 September
  - Dale's Supermarket Sweep returns to ITV for its sixth series, now airing in an afternoon slot following ITV's decision to abolish the 9:25am gameshow slot earlier in the year.
  - Channel 4 pulls a documentary from the following day's schedule after learning that it was faked. Daddy's Girl tells the story of aspiring model Victoria and her father, Marcus, who speaks candidly of his feelings about his daughter's career, but father and daughter are revealed to be boyfriend and girlfriend when Victoria's real father contacts Channel 4 after seeing a trailer for the documentary.
- 4 September
  - The big-money game show Who Wants to Be a Millionaire? makes its debut on ITV; it is presented by Chris Tarrant.
  - Emmerdale actress Lisa Riley replaces Jeremy Beadle as the presenter of You've Been Framed! on ITV.
  - Channel One announces the closure of its channels in London and Bristol and the sale of its sole operation in Liverpool.
- 5 September
  - The football magazine series On the Ball makes its debut on ITV; it is presented by Gabby Yorath.
  - Debut on ITV of The Moment of Truth, a game show presented by Cilla Black, in which families or groups of friends can win prizes if one of their members is able to complete a difficult task, such as getting 24 tiddlywinks into a pot in under two minutes or memorising then playing the US national anthem on a xylophone. The show achieves audiences of nine million, but is criticised as being cruel because children are shown the prizes even though they could lose and are visibly distressed when their family loses. Black herself later admits she was not "emotionally prepared" for the reaction of losing contestants and the rules are changed to allow larger consolation prizes for the second series.
- 9 September
  - Manchester United F.C. informs the London Stock Exchange that it has accepted a £623.4 million takeover bid by Rupert Murdoch's British Sky Broadcasting.
  - The network television premiere in ITV of Batman Forever, starring Val Kilmer, Chris O'Donnell, Nicole Kidman, Tommy Lee Jones and Jim Carrey.
- 10 September – Sky Movies Screen 1, Sky Movies Screen 2 and Sky Movies Gold have their names changed to Sky Premier, Sky MovieMax and Sky Cinema ahead of the launch of digital television.
- 12 September – London's Burning returns to ITV for its eleventh series with a new set of opening and closing credits.
- 14 September
  - Data released by the National Grid indicates that a special edition of EastEnders which aired the previous evening beat ITV's Sunday edition of Coronation Street. Power surges recorded as the soaps ended suggest three times as many viewers tuned into EastEnders over Coronation Street.
  - Debut of the popular sitcom The Royle Family on BBC Two, later on BBC One; it stars Ricky Tomlinson, Sue Johnston, Caroline Aherne, Ralf Little, Craig Cash and Liz Smith and is written by Aherne and Cash.
- 17 September – ITV's This Morning conducts the first live test of the anti-impotence drug Viagra.
- 18 September – In an attempt to attract more viewers to its soap Family Affairs, Channel 5 announces that its entire central cast, the Hart family, will be killed off in a dramatic storyline.
- 19 September – BBC Two airs a special Bee Gees edition of TOTP2.
- 21 September
  - The long-running BBC soap EastEnders is sold to television stations in Ireland for the first time despite airing in Northern Ireland at the same time as its first broadcast in the rest of the UK. The first Irish television network to air the series is the newly launched commercial free-to-air channel TV3.
  - Debut on ITV of the talk show Trisha, presented by Trisha Goddard.
- 23 September
  - BBC Choice, the UK's first digital-only television channel, launches.
  - BBC Parliament launches on digital satellite and analogue cable. It replaces the cable-only Parliamentary Channel.
  - The BBC warns Blue Peter viewers to ignore a hoax chain letter claiming to be supported by the show.
  - ITV's Autumn schedule will include what is reported to be the most expensive costume drama the broadcaster has ever made, being the seafaring adventure Hornblower, which will cost £3 million an episode to produce.
- 25 September – After less than four years on air, the Channel One channels in London and Bristol/Bath close.
- 28 September – Three police officers are awarded substantial libel damages against Granada at the High Court after the broadcast of an April 1992 edition of World in Action, which accused them of fabricating evidence against a prisoner charged with the murder of his cellmate.
- 29 September – Former Spandau Ballet guitarist turned actor Martin Kemp is to join the cast of EastEnders as a nightclub owner, it is confirmed.

=== October ===
- 1 October
  - Digital satellite television launches in the UK, operated by Sky Digital. This also sees the start of UK channels transmitting in 16:9 widescreen.
  - Sky Sports News is fully launched.
- 2 October – UK Gold Classics launches. On air as a part-time channel, broadcast from Friday to Sunday on Sky Digital from 6pm to 2am, the spin-off from UK Gold airs a number of early shows, including some black-and-white programmes which had been acquired in the early years of the UK Gold service. It also airs some recent shows from the main channel, but its primary purpose is to broadcast older shows from the early years of UK Gold to complement the main channel which has begun to move towards showing newer programmes.
- 5 October
  - ITV adopts a new set of idents and a new logo with lower case lettering themed around a heart design, a year after the BBC launched its new corporate logo.
  - Sky One begins simulcasting part of Virgin Radio's The Chris Evans Breakfast Show after they signed a three-year sponsorship deal with BSkyB. Under the agreement, Evans is not allowed to mention Virgin Radio while the programme is being simulcast with Sky.
  - Sarah, Duchess of York makes her debut as a talk show host on Sky One with the first in a ten-part series titled Sarah... Surviving Life. Each week, she will interview guests who have been through traumatic experiences, discussing with them how they overcame their difficulties. Guests in the first episode include a woman who was raped by serial killer Fred West, a man who killed someone and a car crash survivor. The show, however, is panned by critics and axed in February 1999 because of poor viewing figures.
- 6 October – The BBC announces plans to revamp its news bulletins following an 18-month review of news programming, the largest ever undertaken in the UK. Changes will include a new look Six O'Clock News concentrating on national and regional stories and an increase in world news stories for the Nine O'Clock News.
- 7 October – On today's edition of The Big Breakfast, Denise van Outen announces her intention to leave the series at the end of the year.
- 10 October
  - BBC Two airs Blue Peter Night, a selection of programmes celebrating 40 years of the long-running children's series Blue Peter.
  - UK Play launches. Originally intended as a television version of BBC Radio 1, it shows music programming and videos during the day and comedy during the evening. It has no tie-up with Radio 1, however.
- 12 October – BBC One airs Divas Live, a concert from New York featuring Celine Dion, Mariah Carey, Aretha Franklin, Gloria Estefan and Shania Twain.
- 13 October
  - Debut of Delia's How to Cook on BBC Two, a basic cookery show presented by Delia Smith. The series is criticised by chef and restaurateur Gary Rhodes for its back-to-basics approach while the Devon Fire Brigade criticises a piece of advice she gives to people who wish to season a new frying pan to heat oil in it and leave it to simmer on a low heat for eight hours.
  - The network television premiere on ITV of John McTiernan's 1995 action thriller Die Hard with a Vengeance, starring Bruce Willis, Samuel L. Jackson and Jeremy Irons.
- 15 October – The BBC loses the broadcasting rights to test match cricket after the England and Wales Cricket Board accepts a rival £103 million four-year bid from Channel 4 and BSkyB. The decision brings to an end sixty years of continuous cricket coverage by the BBC.
- 16 October
  - A man who got drunk and ran amok on the set of Central Weekend during a debate on women's football in March, forcing the show to be taken off the air, is jailed for 12 months over the incident.
  - Blue Peter celebrates its 40th anniversary with a special show featuring former presenters.
  - The adventure game show Fort Boyard makes its debut on Channel 5; it is presented by Melinda Messenger with Leslie Grantham.
- 17 October – Noel's House Party returns to BBC One for its eighth series with a major revamp featuring a brand new set and new features. As part of the revamp, the character Mr Blobby is dropped from the show.
- 18 October – The network television premiere on Channel 4 of Martin Scorsese's 1995 epic gangster thriller Casino, starring Robert De Niro, Joe Pesci, Sharon Stone and James Woods.
- 19 October – Richard Bacon becomes the first ever Blue Peter presenter to have his contract terminated in mid-run after tabloid newspaper The News of the World publishes a report of him taking cocaine. After his dismissal, the Head of BBC children's programmes, Lorraine Heggessey, goes on air to explain the situation to CBBC viewers.
- 25 October
  - The T4 strand is launched on Channel 4, as a youth-oriented TV channel aimed for 16–24 year olds.
  - ITV airs Goodnight Mister Tom, a feature-length adaptation based on the 1981 wartime novel of the same name by Michelle Magorian, directed by Jack Gold as his final film. The cast featured well-known stars including John Thaw.
- 26 October – Debut on BBC Two of Ads Infinitum after showing a pilot episode two years earlier.
- 27 October – As part of its Q.E.D. strand, BBC One airs Hope for Helen, a documentary following Helen Rollason's fight against terminal cancer. She had been diagnosed the previous year and given three months to live.
- 30 October – Debut on Channel 4 of the dating series Streetmate, presented by Davina McCall.
- 30–31 October – ITV broadcasts a special themed "Alien Invasion" night devoted to programmes with a mix of science-fiction and horror featuring some of the weirdest links that include Starship Bloopers as well as the quiz show Universe Challenge and John Carpenter's 1982 film version of The Thing, starring Kurt Russell.
- October – Cable and Wireless stops airing the Nordic version of The Children's Channel, thereby ending all UK broadcasts after more than 14 years.

=== November ===
- 1 November
  - S4C Digidol launches in Wales.
  - Launch of FilmFour, a new subscription-based movie service from Channel 4. The opening night is simulcast on Channel 4.
  - The network television premiere on Channel 4 of Bryan Singer's 1995 American neo-noir mystery thriller The Usual Suspects, starring Kevin Spacey, Gabriel Byrne, Pete Postlethwaite, Stephen Baldwin and Benicio del Toro.
- 9 November – Release of Voice of an Angel, the debut album from Charlotte Church, who was discovered after singing Andrew Lloyd Webber's "Pie Jesu" down the telephone on an edition of ITV's This Morning the previous year. She goes on to make appearances on Talking Telephone Numbers and The Big Big Talent Show, which help to launch her career.
- 12 November – Debut on BBC One of the sitcom Dinnerladies, created, written by and starring Victoria Wood.
- 15 November
  - Digital terrestrial television launches in the UK from 81 transmitters, operated by ONdigital. It changes its name to ITV Digital in July 2001 and goes into administration a year later.
  - Carlton launches three new channels, Carlton Cinema, Carlton Kids and Carlton World while Granada, in conjunction with Littlewoods launches the home-shopping channel Shop!
  - After airing a pilot episode the previous year, the first full series of the comedy-drama Cold Feet begins on ITV.
- 18 November
  - The British Egg Information Service reports that egg sales have increased by 10% since the debut of Delia Smith's BBC Two series Delia's How to Cook which teaches viewers basic cookery skills.
  - The National Grid reports a surge in the use of electricity at 8pm as the Coronation Street episode featuring the death of the character Des Barnes, played by Philip Middlemiss, reaches its conclusion.
- 19 November
  - ITV is given permission to move its 10pm news bulletin by the Independent Television Commission, a decision that will allow the channel to axe News at Ten in early 1999. ITV wants to move the programme because of declining ratings and to make way for films and dramas to air uninterrupted in its evening schedule, but the plans have been criticised by senior journalists and politicians who fear it will lead to a reduction in the quality of evening television. Once the changes are implemented, ITV's main evening bulletin will air at 6:30pm, with a shorter news programme at 11pm.
  - Members of the National Assembly Against Racism, one of Britain's leading anti-racism groups, stage a protest outside the headquarters of Channel 4 as the channel airs a Dispatches documentary that claims to have established that most juvenile gang rapes are carried out by black youths.
- 20 November
  - The Independent Television Commission orders ITV to take its advertising campaign for digital television off air because it is "derogatory" towards satellite television. The campaign had featured a crossed out satellite dish and had attracted complaints from other major broadcasters in the week it was shown. The regulator also decides that future digital television advertising campaigns by ITV must be submitted to the Broadcast Advertising Clearance Centre before going on the air.
  - At London's Wandsworth County Court, the makers of Channel 4's game show Fifteen to One are awarded a county court judgment against Trevor Montague, a former series champion who broke the show's rule that losing contestants cannot appear on the show again. Having lost in 1989, he reapplied under a different name in 1992 and went on to become series champion, but was subsequently identified by a contestant who watched a repeat of the show on Challenge TV. He must pay £3,562 in compensation and return his prizes, two goblets and a set of decanters to Regent Productions.
- 22 November – The BBC confirms that Patsy Palmer, who plays Bianca Butcher in EastEnders, will leave the soap in 1999 to spend more time with her family.
- 27 November – ITV has scrapped plans for a documentary investigating claims of anti-English racism in Scotland because there is not enough evidence to support it, the Daily Record reports.

=== December ===
- 1 December – Channel 4 marks World AIDS Day with a fundraising evening of music and comedy, presented by Stephen Fry.
- 2 December
  - ITV airs the first celebrity special of Stars in Their Eyes, which features Carol Vorderman performing as Cher and five female cast members of Coronation Street as The Spice Girls. The episode is won by Steven Houghton as Tony Hadley.
  - ITV airs the one-off entertainment show Men for Sale, a special hour-long event hosted by Ulrika Jonsson and Denise van Outen, in which male celebrities go under the hammer to raise money for charity with three musical guest appearances including the Spanish crooner Julio Iglesias, pianist Jools Holland and the boy band 911.
- 3 December – Channel 4 announces it has secured a £400,000 deal to air the only international interview with Monica Lewinsky, the woman at the centre of the sex scandal involving US President Bill Clinton.
- 7 December
  - The long-running current affairs series World in Action ends after 35 years, its final edition being an investigation into Britain's alcohol consumption called "Britain on the Booze". It will be replaced in April 1999 with Tonight.
  - Launch of the UK's second digital-only TV channel ITV2.
- 9 December – Channel 4 News unveils a new look for its hour-long bulletin and a new set which will be seen on air from January 1999 and marks the biggest change for the programme since its launch in 1982. Jon Snow will continue to present the bulletin.
- 11 December – BBC governors reject a request to give Scotland its own Six O'Clock News bulletin. Instead, an extra £20 million will be spent on new jobs and programming in Scotland, Wales and Northern Ireland.
- 12 December
  - The Commission for Racial Equality has called on British soaps to change the way black and Asian people are portrayed after Marcus Wrigley, a new black character in Coronation Street, is seen breaking into a house in one of his first scenes.
  - Viewers of the Living channel accidentally see five minutes of an adult film being aired by Television X following a switching error by the company relaying both channels. The interruption which occurs during an edition of The Jerry Springer Show generates seven complaints to the Independent Television Commission. The company responsible for the glitch later apologises and makes technical changes to ensure it won't happen again.
- 13 December
  - Footballer Michael Owen is named as this year's BBC Sports Personality of the Year.
  - The network television premiere of David Hogan's 1996 futuristic action thriller Barb Wire on Channel 4, starring Pamela Anderson Lee, Temuera Morrison and Xander Berkeley.
  - ITV's long-running programme Sunday morning programme for disabled people, Link is broadcast for the final time.
- 14 December
  - After a world-record-breaking 75 consecutive victories, Ian Lygo makes his final appearance on the Channel 5 game show 100%, after being forced to retire by the show's producers.
  - After 22 years of presenting Sooty, Matthew Corbett announces his retirement and hand picks Richard Cadell and Liana Bridges as his successors in the very last edition of Sooty & Co. They appear throughout the final series of the show.
  - The network television premiere on ITV of Jonathan Demme's 1993 American legal drama Philadelphia, starring Tom Hanks and Denzel Washington.
- 15 December – Holiday presenter Jill Dando rules herself out of becoming the face of a planned relaunched BBC Six O'Clock News following much media speculation on the topic. She says she plans to leave BBC News to concentrate on her presenting roles.
- 16 December – Regular programming is interrupted when the United States and the United Kingdom launch air strikes against Iraq after that country fails to comply with the United Nations Security Council resolutions regarding Weapons of Mass Destruction.
- 17 December – Jane Root is appointed Controller of BBC Two, becoming the first female head of a BBC channel. She will replace the outgoing incumbent, Mark Thompson, in January 1999.
- 18 December
  - BBC political correspondent Huw Edwards is confirmed as the new face of the Six O'Clock News, taking over when the programme is revamped next year.
  - Carlton is fined £2 million by the Independent Television Commission for a 1996 documentary called The Connection in which actors pretended to be drug traffickers.
- 19 December – Denise van Outen presents the final of the first Record of the Year for ITV, a show allowing viewers to vote for their favourite single of 1998 through a phone-in poll. More than a million viewers call to register their vote, making it the UK's largest ever television phone poll. Of the ten songs shortlisted for the show, Irish boy band Boyzone's single "No Matter What" emerges as the winner.
- 20 December – Sky One airs the third Christmas episode of The Simpsons, featuring a special guest appearance by Jeopardy host Alex Trebek.
- 21 December
  - Coronation Street unveils its first Asian family, the Desais, who will be seen on screen from the New Year. They are Ravi Desai, played by Saeed Jaffrey, his daughter Nita (Rebecca Sarker) and son Vikram (Chris Bisson), and will take over running the corner shop from Fred Elliott (John Savident).
  - The National Federation of SubPostmasters criticises the forthcoming Christmas Day episode of Emmerdale for featuring the death of a village postmaster during a robbery, expressing concerns it could prompt a spate of copycat incidents. The union calls on ITV to pull the episode, which sees the character Vic Windsor (Alun Lewis) killed after he strikes his head during a robbery at his post office. ITV says it has taken care not to breach Post Office security during the episode's filming.
- 22 December – BBC One airs These Are Special Times, a TV special recorded by Celine Dion and featuring appearances from Andrea Bocelli and Rosie O'Donnell.
- 24 December
  - BBC One shows the network premiere of the 1994 Christmas comedy film The Santa Clause, starring Tim Allen.
  - Raymond Briggs' The Bear makes its debut on Channel 4.
  - A £30 million advertising campaign for the Millennium Dome kicks off with a 60-second advert voiced by actor Jeremy Irons that invites viewers to imagine the achievements of the past 1,000 years had happened in one day. Major events such as the consecration of Westminster Abbey, the plays of William Shakespeare and the fall of the Berlin Wall are highlighted against the backdrop of the Easter Island Statues from sunrise to sunset.
  - The final episode of the sitcom Birds of a Feather is broadcast on BBC One, although it will be revived on ITV in 2014.
- 25 December
  - Christmas Day highlights on BBC One include the 1994 Christmas film Miracle on 34th Street, starring Richard Attenborough, the 1995 family film Babe, and the first of three new episodes of Men Behaving Badly.
  - BBC Two airs a special documentary about the popular children's series Teletubbies called Big Hug!: The Story of Teletubbies. The special takes a look at the phenomenal success of the series, how it came about, the way it was done, how it was criticized and been under fire, the differences between children's television in the old and later days, how the series was commissioned for the BBC and how children communicate to the "Tubby" language. There are also interviews with several people include the creator of the Teletubbies Anne Wood, the co-creator and writer Andrew Davenport, Anna Home a former BBC executive who commissioned the series prior to retiring, journalist and food writer Nigella Lawson, Oliver Postgate, the creator and writer of Bagpuss, The Clangers, Noggin the Nog, Pogles' Wood, Ivor the Engine and Pingwings and the president and CEO of the Children's Television Workshop David Britt.
  - The first ITV Panto is broadcast, starting with Jack and the Beanstalk.
  - Channel 4 airs The Omen, Richard Donner's 1976 supernatural horror film depicting the Antichrist, at 10:30pm, but it leads to six viewer complaints that its scheduling on Christmas Day was in poor taste and the Broadcasting Standards Commission later agrees with this sentiment. However, the ruling on 27 May 1999 draws criticism from Channel 4 Chief Executive Michael Jackson, who describes it as "typical of how the commission fails to get things in proportion" and says he would schedule the film similarly again.
- 26 December – Boxing Day highlights on BBC One include the films Casper, Free Willy 2 and The Naked Gun 2½: The Smell of Fear as well as the second of three episodes of Men Behaving Badly.
- 27 December – BBC One airs the 1997 costume drama Mrs Brown, starring Judi Dench and Billy Connolly.
- 28 December – BBC One concludes its Christmas trilogy of new episodes of Men Behaving Badly.
- 29 December
  - The long-running series Come Dancing marks its 50th anniversary with an edition of the show from London's Royal Albert Hall which would be the last one ever made; the final regular series was shown in 1995.
  - BBC Two airs a special edition of TOTP2 dedicated to glam rock.
- 29–30 December – BBC One airs a two-part dramatisation of Minette Walters' 1997 crime novel The Echo, starring Clive Owen and Joely Richardson.
- 30 December
  - Provisional viewing figures indicate that BBC One had seven of the top ten most watched programmes over the Christmas weekend. The 28 December episode of EastEnders achieved first place with 15.7 million viewers, followed by an episode of Coronation Street from the previous day with 15.1 million. The final episode of Men Behaving Badly was watched by 14 million viewers.
  - The US supernatural series Buffy the Vampire Slayer makes its UK terrestrial debut on BBC Two.
- 31 December
  - An episode of EastEnders in which the character Tiffany Mitchell is killed when she is hit by a car driven by Frank Butcher is watched by 22 million viewers.
  - Other New Year's Eve highlights for BBC One include the film Getting Even with Dad and Shirley Bassey: Viva Diva in which she performs a number of show tunes with the backing of a large orchestra and the cast of the musical Chicago.

=== Unknown ===
- Early in 1998, BBC2 stops shutting down its transmitters when it isn't broadcasting the BBC Learning Zone. Instead, BBC2 broadcasts Pages from Ceefax during all overnight downtime.
- Vanni Treves succeeds Sir Michael Bishop as Chairman of Channel 4.

== Debuts ==
=== BBC One ===
- 4 January – The Ambassador (1998–1999)
- 8 January – Roger Roger (1998–2003)
- 9 January – Wiggly Park (1998)
- 12 January – Looking After Jo Jo (1998)
- 13 January – The Cruise (1998)
- 24 January – Unfinished Business (1998–1999)
- 6 February – Mortimer's Law (1998)
- 22 February – Heaven on Earth (1998)
- 8 March – Playing the Field (1998–2002)
- 15 March – The Last Salute (1998–1999)
- 28 March – Big Ticket (1998)
- 4 April – City Central (1998–2000)
- 10 April – The Scold's Bridle (1998)
- 16 April – The Ben Elton Show (1998)
- 19 April – A Respectable Trade (1998)
- 4 May – Kiss Me Kate (1998–2000)
- 8 May – Invasion: Earth (1998)
- 10 May – Berkeley Square (1998)
- 20 May
  - The Human Body (1998)
  - Out of Hours (1998)
- 25 May – My Summer with Des (1998)
- 18 July – Little White Lies (1998)
- 20 July – Heartburn Hotel (1998–2000)
- 28 July – Maisie Raine (1998–1999)
- 26 August – The X Creatures (1998)
- 31 August – The Mrs Bradley Mysteries (1998–2000)
- 6 September
  - Big Cat (1998)
  - The Heaven and Earth Show (1998–2007)
- 22 September – Party of a Lifetime (1998)
- 1 October – Undercover Heart (1998)
- 12 October – Pass the Buck (1998–2000)
- 21 October – The Life of Birds (1998)
- 1 November – Vanity Fair (1998)
- 12 November – dinnerladies (1998–2000)
- 15 November – Children of the New Forest (1998)
- 25 December – Rotten Ralph (1998–2001)
- 29 December – Paddington Green (1998–2001)
- 29 December – The Echo (1998)

=== BBC Two ===
- 8 January – Jeremy Clarkson's Extreme Machines (1998)
- 12 January
  - Goodness Gracious Me (1998–2001)
  - Look and Read: The Legend of the Lost Keys (1998)
- 15 January – Louis Theroux's Weird Weekends (1998–2000)
- 15 February – This Morning with Richard Not Judy (1998–1999)
- 20 February
  - Is It Bill Bailey? (1998)
  - Robot Wars (1998–2004, 2016–2018)
- 24 February – How Do You Want Me? (1998–1999)
- 8 March – Obsession series (4 eps – Getting Hurt/ Stand & Deliver/ Guiltrip/ Anorak of Fire) (1998)
- 9 March – Our Mutual Friend (1998)
- 20 April – Stressed Eric (1998–2000)
- 8 May – Alexei Sayle's Merry-Go-Round (1998)
- 12 May – Sir Bernard's Stately Homes (1998)
- 26 May – In the Red (1998)
- 30 May – Windrush (1998)
- 16 June – Spoonface Steinberg (1998)
- 21 June – The Tribe (1998) (Made in 1996)
- 14 July – In the Footsteps of Alexander the Great (1998)
- 15 July – Amongst Women (1998)
- 14 September – The Royle Family (1998–2000, 2006–2012, later series on BBC One)
- 15 September – Touch and Go (1998)
- 2 October – The Creatives (1998–2000)
- 4 October – Shot Through the Heart (1998)
- 13 October – Delia's How to Cook (1998–2002)
- 19 October – The Cops (1998–2001)
- 21 October – Despatch Box (1998–2002)
- 28 October – Brothers and Sisters (1998)
- 9 November – Big Train (1998–2002)
- 14 November – Lesley Garrett Tonight (1998)
- 21 December – Rex the Runt (1998–2001)
- 30 December – Buffy the Vampire Slayer (1997–2003)

=== ITV (Including ITV and ITV2) ===
- 5 January – Teddybears (1998–1999)
- 8 January – The Forgotten Toys (1998–1999)
- 9 January – Tom and Vicky (1998–1999)
- 14 January – ITV Nightscreen (1998–2021)
- 23 January – Friday Night's All Wright (1998–2000)
- 24 January – Ice Warriors (1998)
- 28 January – Heat of the Sun (1998)
- 8 February – My Kind of Music (1998–2002)
- 26 February – Passport Quiz (1998–2003)
- 3 March – The Life and Crimes of William Palmer (1998)
- 6 March – Airline (1998–2007)
- 8 March – Tess of the D'Urbervilles (1998)
- 12 March – Seesaw (1998)
- 14 March – Diggit (1998–2005)
- 24 March – Waffle (1998)
- 25 March – March in Windy City (1998)
- 2 April – Oktober (1998)
- 5 April – Wuthering Heights (1998)
- 12 April – Coming Home (1998)
- 14 April – Under Offer (1998–2001)
- 17 April – Magic with Everything (1998)
- 28 April – Rocky and the Dodos (1998–1999)
- 16 May – Don't Try This at Home (1998–2001)
- 25 May – The Stalker's Apprentice (1998)
- 30 May – Fun Song Factory (1998–2006)
- 6 July
  - Far from the Madding Crowd (1998)
  - Get Real (1998)
- 13 July – Brilliant Creatures (1998–2003)
- 14 July – PD James' A Certain Justice (1998)
- 19 July – Duck Patrol (1998)
- 23 July – Babes in the Wood (1998–1999)
- 29 August
  - SMTV Live (1998–2003)
  - CD:UK (1998–2006)
- 1 September – Supply & Demand (1998)
- 2 September – Mad for It (1998–2000)
- 4 September
  - Who Wants to Be a Millionaire? (1998–2014, 2018–present)
  - Archibald the Koala (1998–2000)
- 5 September
  - The Moment of Truth (1998–2001)
  - Motorway Life (1998–2001)
- 7 September – Liverpool 1 (1998–1999)
- 21 September – Trisha Goddard (1998–2010)
- 23 September – The Thoughts of Chairman Alf (1998)
- 25 September – The Adventures of Captain Pugwash (1998–2001)
- 7 October – Hornblower (1998–2003)
- 22 October – The Worst Witch (1998–2001)
- 25 October – Goodnight Mister Tom (1998)
- 26 October – Draw Your Own Toons (1998–2001)
- 27 October – Grafters (1998–1999)
- 29 October – Picking Up the Pieces (1998)
- 30 October – Starship Bloopers (1998)
- 15 November
  - Cold Feet (1998–2003, 2016–2020)
  - Sermon from St. Albion's (1998–1999)
- 20 December – Frenchman's Creek (1998)
- 25 December – ITV Panto (1998–2002)
- 27 December
  - Kids Say the Darndest Things (1998–2000)
  - Cider with Rosie (1998)
- 28 December – Power Rangers Lost Galaxy (1998–1999)

=== Channel 4 ===
- 4 January – Pippi Longstocking (1997–1998)
- 12 February – Mosley (1998)
- 12 April – Scrapheap Challenge (1998–2010)
- 2 May – Dawson's Creek (1998–2003)
- 5 May – Killer Net (1998)
- 3 June – Ally McBeal (1997–2002)
- 15 June – Watercolour Challenge (1998–2001, 2022–present)
- 24 June – Barking (1998)
- 3 July – So Graham Norton (1998–2002)
- 10 July – South Park (1997–present)
- 1 August – More Tales of the City (1998)
- 15 September – Ultraviolet (1998)
- 30 September – The 11 O'Clock Show (1998–2000)
- 25 October – T4 (1998–2012)
- 30 October – Streetmate (1998–2007)
- 9 November – Comedy Lab (1998–2011) (Anthology series)
- 10 November – The Young Person's Guide to Becoming a Rock Star (1998)
- 18 November – Bob and Margaret (1998–2001)
- 21 November – History Hunters (1998–1999)
- 5 December – Angry Kid (1998–2019)
- 24 December – The Bear (1998)

=== Channel 5 ===
- 2 January – PB Bear and Friends (1998)
- 4 February – The Pepsi Chart Show (1998–2002)
- 28 April – Open House with Gloria Hunniford (1998–2003)
- 10 June – Compromising Situations (1994)
- 27 June – Loggerheads (1998–1999)
- 24 August – House Doctor (1998–2003)
- 16 October – Fort Boyard (1998–2001, 2003)
- 29 October – Sex and Shopping (1998–2001)

== Channels ==
=== New channels ===
Date	Channel
February	Boro TV
4 April	TV Travel Shop
26 June	Kiss TV
1 September	Animal Planet
10 September	MUTV
23 September	BBC Choice
23 September	BBC Parliament
1 October	Sky Sports News
2 October	UK Gold Classics
10 October	UK Play
1 November	S4C Digidol
1 November	FilmFour
15 November	Carlton Cinema
15 November	Carlton Kids
15 November	Carlton World
7 December	ITV2

=== Defunct channels ===
Date	Channel
30 January	The Weather Channel
31 March	CMT Europe
3 April	TCC (original)
31 May	Sky Scottish
22 September	The Parliamentary Channel
25 September	Channel One in London and Bristol/Bath

=== Rebranded channels ===
Date	Old Name	New Name
1 May	Granada Good Life	Granada Breeze
10 September	Sky Movies Screen 1	Sky Premier
10 September	Sky Movies Screen 2	Sky MovieMax
10 September	Sky Movies Gold	Sky Cinema

== Television shows ==
=== Returning this year after a break of one year or longer ===
- Talking Heads (1988, 1998)
- James the Cat (1984–1992 ITV, 1998–2003 Channel 5)
- 4 March – The Wombles (1973–1975, 1998–2001)

== Continuing television shows ==
=== 1920s ===
- BBC Wimbledon (1927–1939, 1946–2019, 2021–present)

=== 1930s ===
- Trooping the Colour (1937–1939, 1946–2019, 2023–present)
- The Boat Race (1938–1939, 1946–2019, 2021–present)
- BBC Cricket (1939, 1946–1999, 2020–2024)

=== 1940s ===
- Come Dancing (1949–1998)

=== 1950s ===
- Panorama (1953–present)
- Take Your Pick! (1955–1968, 1992–1998)
- What the Papers Say (1956–2008)
- The Sky at Night (1957–present)
- Blue Peter (1958–present)
- Grandstand (1958–2007)

=== 1960s ===
- Coronation Street (1960–present)
- Songs of Praise (1961–present)
- Top of the Pops (1964–2006)
- Match of the Day (1964–present)
- Mr. and Mrs. (1965–1999)
- Sportsnight (1965–1997)
- Call My Bluff (1965–2005)
- The Money Programme (1966–2010)

=== 1970s ===
- Rainbow (1972–1992, 1994–1997)
- Emmerdale (1972–present)
- Newsround (1972–present)
- Last of the Summer Wine (1973–2010)
- Wish You Were Here...? (1974–2003)
- Arena (1975–present)
- One Man and His Dog (1976–present)
- Grange Hill (1978–2008)
- Ski Sunday (1978–present)
- Antiques Roadshow (1979–present)
- Question Time (1979–present)

=== 1980s ===
- Play Your Cards Right (1980–1987, 1994–1999, 2002–2003)
- Family Fortunes (1980–2002, 2006–2015, 2020–present)
- Children in Need (1980–present)
- Timewatch (1982–present)
- Brookside (1982–2003)
- Countdown (1982–present)
- Right to Reply (1982–2001)
- Surprise Surprise (1984–2001, 2012–2015)
- Crimewatch UK (1984–2017)
- The Bill (1984–2010)
- Channel 4 Racing (1984–2016)
- Thomas & Friends (1984–2021)
- EastEnders (1985–present)
- The Cook Report (1987–1999)
- Crosswits (1985–1998)
- Screen Two (1985–1998)
- Telly Addicts (1985–1998)
- Blind Date (1985–2003, 2017–2019)
- Comic Relief (1985–present)
- The Chart Show (1986–1998, 2008–2009)
- Equinox (1986–2006)
- The Really Wild Show (1986–2006)
- Casualty (1986–present)
- The Time, The Place (1987–1998)
- ChuckleVision (1987–2009)
- Wheel of Fortune (1988–2001, 2024–present)
- London's Burning (1988–2002)
- On the Record (1988–2002)
- Fifteen to One (1988–2003, 2013–2019)
- This Morning (1988–present)
- Children's Ward (1989–2000)
- Mike and Angelo (1989–2000)
- Birds of a Feather (1989–1998, 2014–2020)
- Bodger & Badger (1989–1999)

=== 1990s ===
- Drop the Dead Donkey (1990–1998)
- One Foot in the Grave (1990–2000)
- Rosie and Jim (1990–2000)
- MasterChef (1990–2001, 2005–present)
- How 2 (1990–2006)
- Stars in Their Eyes (1990–2006, 2015)
- 2point4 Children (1991–1999)
- Big Break (1991–2002)
- Noel's House Party (1991–1999)
- GamesMaster (1992–1998)
- Heartbeat (1992–2010)
- Men Behaving Badly (1992–1998)
- The Big Breakfast (1992–2002)
- 999 (1992–2003)
- Sooty & Co. (1993–1998)
- Mr. Motivator exercise routines (1993–2000)
- Breakfast with Frost (1993–2005)
- Ky’s Cartoons (1994–1999)
- Animal Hospital (1994–2004)
- The National Lottery Draws (1994–2017)
- Time Team (1994–2013)
- The Vicar of Dibley (1994–2007)
- Wipeout (1994–2003)
- Frasier (1993–2004)
- Wycliffe (1994–1998)
- Top of the Pops 2 (1994–present)
- Father Ted (1995–1998)
- Hollyoaks (1995–present)
- Is It Legal? (1995–1998)
- Dennis the Menace (1996–1998)
- Jonathan Creek (1997–2016)
- Teletubbies (1997–2001)

== Ending this year ==
- Come Dancing (1949–1998)
- Take Your Pick! (1955–1968, 1992–1998)
- The Rockford Files (1974–2016 BBC 1997–1998 ITV)
- Sale of the Century (1972–1990 ITV, 1997–1998 Challenge)
- Alas Smith and Jones (1982–1998)
- Crosswits (1985–1998)
- Screen Two (1985–1998)
- Telly Addicts (1985–1998)
- The Chart Show (1986–1998, 2008–2009)
- Birds of a Feather (1989–1998 BBC, 2014–2020 ITV)
- The Riddlers (1989–1998)
- Drop the Dead Donkey (1990–1998)
- Men Behaving Badly (1992–1998)
- GamesMaster (1992–1998)
- Run the Risk (1993–1998)
- Sooty & Co. (1993–1998)
- Tots TV (1993–1998)
- Wycliffe (1993–1998)
- Father Ted (1995–1998)
- Absolutely Animals (1995–1998)
- The Caribou Kitchen (1995–1998)
- Is It Legal? (1995–1998)
- Scratchy & Co. (1995–1998)
- The Demon Headmaster (1996–1998)
- Wake Up in the Wild Room (1996–1998)
- Bimble's Bucket (1996–1998)
- Dennis the Menace (1996–1998)
- Mashed (1997–1998)
- A Prince Among Men (1997–1998)
- Noah's Ark (1997–1998)
- Whittle (1997–1998)
- Enid Blyton's Enchanted Lands (1997–1998)
- Tess of the D'Urbervilles (1998)
- Ice Warriors (1998)
- PB Bear and Friends (1998)
- Vanity Fair (1998)

== Births ==
- 21 February – Ella-Rae Smith
- 29 April – Ella Hunt
- 24 May – Daisy Edgar-Jones
- 5 August – Mimi Keene

== Deaths ==
Date	Name	Age	Cinematic Credibility
2 January	Frank Muir	77	comedy writer, radio and television personality, and raconteur
11 January	John Wells	61	actor and scriptwriter (That Was The Week That Was)
25 January	Sidney Cole	89	television producer
3 February	Davy Kaye	81	actor (Sapphire and Steel)
20 February	Henry Livings	68	television scriptwriter
28 February	Dermot Morgan	45	actor (Father Ted Crilly in Father Ted)
20 March	Ivor Slaney	76	theme tune composer
25 March	Daniel Massey	64	actor (The Roads to Freedom)
2 May	Kevin Lloyd	49	actor (The Bill)
19 May	Edwin Astley	76	theme tune composer (The Saint, Danger Man, The Baron)
27 May	Robert Muller	72	television scriptwriter
28 May	Lana Morris	68	actress (The Saint, The Forsyte Saga, Howards' Way)
5 June	Viola Keats	87	actress
4 July	Gladys Ambrose	67	actress (Brookside)
5 July	Johnny Speight	78	television scriptwriter (Till Death Us Do Part)
21 July	Kenneth Watson	66	actor (Dixon of Dock Green, Coronation Street, Take the High Road)
22 July	Michael Denison	82	actor (Boyd in Boyd QC)
23 July	John Hopkins	67	screenwriter (Z-Cars)
4 August	Richard Dunn	54	CEO of Thames Television
11 August	Derek Newark	65	actor
14 August	Rosemary Martin	61	actress
25 August	Barbara Mandell	78	television journalist and UK's first female newsreader
19 September	Patricia Hayes	88	narrator, actress and voice actress (Gran)
30 September	Marius Goring	86	actor (The Expert)
10 October	Jacqueline Mackenzie	71	news reporter
17 October	Joan Hickson	92	actress (Agatha Christie's Miss Marple).
10 November	Peter Cotes	86	television producer and director
10 November	Mary Millar	62	actress (Keeping Up Appearances)
19 November	Bernard Thompson	72	television producer and director
29 November	Robin Ray	64	television presenter
3 December	George Murcell	73	actor
7 December	John Addison	78	theme tune composer
8 December	Michael Craze	56	actor (Doctor Who)
13 December	Sir Lew Grade	91	showbusiness impresario and television company executive
21 December	Roger Avon	84	actor
30 December	George Webb	87	actor (Keeping Up Appearances)

== See also ==
- 1998 in British music
- 1998 in British radio
- 1998 in the United Kingdom
- List of British films of 1998
