= 1998 in British radio =

This is a list of events in British radio during 1998.

== Events ==
=== January ===
- 21 January – Capital FM mid morning presenter Steve Penk attracts national attention after making a prank call to 10 Downing Street in which he pretends to be William Hague and speaks to Prime Minister Tony Blair.

=== February ===
- 16 February – The PopMaster quiz segment of the Ken Bruce Show on BBC Radio 2 is first broadcast.

=== March ===
- Undated in March
  - Andy Parfitt replaces Matthew Bannister as controller of Radio 1.
  - Isle of Wight Radio switches from AM to FM broadcasting. In addition to its main transmitter at Chillerton Down, the station uses three relay transmitters to cover the full island.

=== April ===
- 1 April – By way of an April Fool's stunt, Kix 96 breakfast show presenter Nic Tuff calls South African president Nelson Mandela pretending to be British prime minister Tony Blair.
- 4 April – BBC Radio 3's weekday breakfast programme On Air begins broadcasting at the weekend.
- 6 April – Extensive schedule changes are made to BBC Radio 4. These include an earlier start to the day – 5:30 am instead of 6 am – and an earlier, 6 am, start to Today. Many long standing programmes are axed as part of the shake-up and arts magazine Kaleidoscope is replaced by Front Row.
- 12 April – A Sunday evening episode of The Archers is introduced.
- 13 April – After nearly 30 years on air, Dance Band Days is broadcast on BBC Radio 2 for the final time.
- Undated in April – After just seven months on air, East Midlands station Radio 106 is rebranded as Century 106 and relaunched with a new team of presenters.

=== May ===
- No events.

=== June ===
- 1 June – Capital Gold replaces South Coast Radio. 1998 also sees Capital Gold rolled out in Birmingham and Kent, replacing Xtra AM and Invicta Supergold respectively.
- Undated in June – Emap purchases London station Melody 105.4 FM.

=== July ===
- 9 July – The BBC unveils a new range of digital car stereos that will go on sale in August.

=== August ===
- Undated in August – Virgin Radio launches a new Saturday afternoon football show called Rock 'n' Roll Football.

=== September ===
- Undated in September – Kevin Greening leaves the BBC Radio 1 breakfast show, leaving Zoë Ball as sole presenter. She continues to host the show until March 2000.

=== October ===
- 2 October – John Dunn presents his final drivetime show on Radio 2 after 22 years.
- 4 October – On Radio 2, David Jacobs presents Frank Sinatra: The Voice of the Century, a 13-part documentary about the life and career of Frank Sinatra. The series concludes on 27 December.
- 5 October
  - A major overhaul of the BBC Radio 2 schedule sees many new faces joining the network, including the singer Katrina Leskanich and former Radio 1 presenter Lynn Parsons, who present overnight shows on weekdays and weekends respectively. Johnnie Walker also joins Radio 2 as a regular presenter hosting the afternoon drivetime show (Monday to Thursday). Sally Boazman becomes the station's first official traffic presenter.
  - One hour of Virgin Radio's breakfast show starts simulcasting on Sky One. When a track is played on the radio, viewers see the song's video.
- 9 October – Des Lynam joins Radio 2 to present a weekly drivetime programme on Fridays.
- 12 October – Chris Moyles is promoted from the Early Breakfast show to present the Radio 1 Early Drive show, between 4 pm and 5:45 pm on weekdays (later being extended to 3 – 5:45 pm). He replaces Dave Pearce, and is replaced on Early Breakfast by Scott Mills.
- 15 October – Launch of In Our Time, a weekly series of historical, scientific, literary or philosophical discussions between a presenter and three academics on BBC Radio 4. It will pass its 1000th edition in 2023 and be chaired by Melvyn Bragg until 2025.

=== November ===
- 12 November – TalkCo Holdings, whose chairman and chief executive is former Sun editor Kelvin MacKenzie, purchases Talk Radio.
- 19 November – Mellow 1557 closes and relaunches on FM as Dream 100.

=== December ===
- Undated in December – Melody Radio is renamed Magic 105.4 FM following the purchase of Melody Radio by Emap.

=== Unknown ===
- BBC Local Radio stations start carrying BBC Radio 5 Live instead of the BBC World Service when they are not on air. Consequently, the station is heard regularly on FM for the first time, albeit only during overnight hours.

== Station debuts ==
- 17 January – KMFM Thanet
- 1 March – Huddersfield FM
- 7 March
  - Isle of Wight Radio
  - Isles FM (Outer Hebrides, Scotland)
- 23 March – Star Radio (Cambridge and Ely)
- 27 March – 107 Crash FM
- 10 April – Arrow FM
- 18 May
  - Kestral FM
  - Active FM
- 25 May – Silk FM
- 6 June – Centre FM
- 14 June – Wave 105
- 15 August – QuayWest Radio
- 1 September – Wire FM
- 7 September – CAT FM
- 8 September – Century 105
- 5 October – Kingdom FM (Fife, Scotland)
- 7 October – Peak FM
- 18 October – Chelmer FM
- 1 November – Fosseway Radio
- 28 November – RNA Arbroath
- 29 November – The Falcon (Gloucestershire)
- 11 December – Champion FM (North Wales)
- 13 December – Rutland Radio

== Programme debuts ==
- January – Scott Mills on BBC Radio 1 (1998–2022)
- 4 March – World of Pub on BBC Radio 4 (1998–1999)
- April – Bussmann and Quantick Kingsize on BBC Radio 4 (April–May)
- 9 April – Material World (1998–2013)
- 11 April – The Archive Hour on BBC Radio 4 (1998–Present)
- 19 April – Broadcasting House on BBC Radio 4 (1998–Present)
- 20 May – The Alan Davies Show on BBC Radio 4 (1998)
- 2 July – Puzzle Panel on BBC Radio 4 (1998–2005)
- 17 July – Like They've Never Been Gone on BBC Radio 4 (1998–2002)
- 31 July – The Write Stuff on BBC Radio 4 (1998–2014)
- 13 August – The Very World of Milton Jones on BBC Radio 4 (1998–2001)
- ? August – Dan and Nick: The Wildebeest Years on BBC Radio 4 (1998)
- 22 September – The 99p Challenge on BBC Radio 4 (1998–2004)
- 26 September – The Now Show on BBC Radio 4 (1998–2024)
- 4 October – Frank Sinatra: The Voice of the Century on BBC Radio 2 (1998)
- 5 October – Drivetime with Johnnie Walker on BBC Radio 2 (1998–2006)
- 9 October – Des Lynam on BBC Radio 2 (1998–1999)
- 15 October – In Our Time on BBC Radio 4 (1998–Present)

== Continuing radio programmes ==
=== 1940s ===
- Sunday Half Hour (1940–2018)
- Desert Island Discs (1942–Present)
- Letter from America (1946–2004)
- Woman's Hour (1946–Present)
- A Book at Bedtime (1949–Present)

=== 1950s ===
- The Archers (1950–Present)
- The Today Programme (1957–Present)
- Sing Something Simple (1959–2001)
- Your Hundred Best Tunes (1959–2007)

=== 1960s ===
- Farming Today (1960–Present)
- In Touch (1961–Present)
- The World at One (1965–Present)
- The Official Chart (1967–Present)
- Just a Minute (1967–Present)
- The Living World (1968–Present)
- The Organist Entertains (1969–2018)

=== 1970s ===
- PM (1970–Present)
- Start the Week (1970–Present)
- You and Yours (1970–Present)
- I'm Sorry I Haven't a Clue (1972–Present)
- Good Morning Scotland (1973–Present)
- Newsbeat (1973–Present)
- The News Huddlines (1975–2001)
- File on 4 (1977–Present)
- Money Box (1977–Present)
- The News Quiz (1977–Present)
- Feedback (1979–Present)
- The Food Programme (1979–Present)
- Science in Action (1979–Present)

=== 1980s ===
- In Business (1983–Present)
- Sounds of the 60s (1983–Present)
- Loose Ends (1986–Present)

=== 1990s ===
- The Moral Maze (1990–Present)
- Essential Selection (1991–Present)
- No Commitments (1992–2007)
- The Pepsi Chart (1993–2002)
- Wake Up to Wogan (1993–2009)
- Essential Mix (1993–Present)
- Up All Night (1994–Present)
- Wake Up to Money (1994–Present)
- Julie Enfield Investigates (1994–1999)
- Private Passions (1995–Present)
- Chambers (1996–1999)
- Parkinson's Sunday Supplement (1996–2007)
- The David Jacobs Collection (1996–2013)
- Blue Jam (1997–1999)
- Westway (1997–2005)

== Ending this year ==
- 3 April
  - The Afternoon Shift (1995–1998)
  - Breakaway (1979–1998)
  - Kaleidoscope (1973–1998)
  - Week Ending (1970–1998)
- 27 December – Frank Sinatra: The Voice of the Century (1998)

== Closing this year ==
- 31 May – Xtra AM (1989–1998)
- Unknown – South Coast Radio (1991–1998)
- Late 1998 – European Klassik Rock (1997–1998)

== Deaths ==
- 2 January – Frank Muir, comedy writer (born 1920)
- 11 April – Francis Durbridge, scriptwriter (born 1912)
- 22 June – Benny Green, jazz saxophonist and radio presenter (born 1927)
- 18 July – Betty Marsden, comedy actress (born 1919)
- 4 August – Charles Maxwell, radio producer (born 1910)
- 2 October
  - Ken Platt, Lancashire comedian (born 1921)
  - Raymond Raikes, radio drama producer (born 1910)
- 20 October – Frank Gillard, broadcaster and executive (born 1909)

== See also ==
- 1998 in British music
- 1998 in British television
- 1998 in the United Kingdom
- List of British films of 1998

== Sources ==
- Evans, Chris (2010). Memoirs of a Fruitcake. HarperCollins. ISBN 978-0-00-734568-7.
