= Big Ticket =

Big Ticket may refer to:

- Big Ticket Entertainment, a production company
- Big Ticket (game show), a game show in the United Kingdom
- Kevin Garnett (born 1976), an American former basketball player.
- Mekhi Becton (born 1999), NFL player for the Los Angeles Chargers

== See also ==
- Big ticket item, an item that has high price compared to other items in a store
