= Chicken feed (disambiguation) =

Chicken feed is food for poultry.

Chicken feed or chickenfeed may also refer to:

- Chicken Feed, a 1927 American silent film
- Chickenfeed (novella), a 2006 crime novel by Minette Walters
- Chickenfeed (retail chain), a former Australian discount store chain
