= Disordered Minds =

2003 crime novel by Minette Walters

DisorderedMinds
- First edition
- Author: Minette Walters
- Language: English
- Genre: Crime / Mystery novel
- Publisher: Macmillan Publishers
- Publication date: 7 November 2003
- Publication place: United Kingdom
- Media type: Print (Hardcover, Paperback) & Audio CD
- Pages: 423 pp (hardback)
- ISBN: 1-4050-3416-5
- OCLC: 55695882
- Dewey Decimal: 823/.914 22
- LC Class: PR6073.A444 D57 2003
- Preceded by: Fox Evil
- Followed by: The Devil's Feather

Disordered Minds is a 2003 crime novel by English writer Minette Walters.

== Synopsis ==
In 1970, Harold Stamp, a intellectually disabled young man, was arrested for the murder of his grandmother - the only person who ever understood him - based on scant evidence and a retracted confession; three years later, having been found guilty by a jury, he kills himself in prison. However, Jonathan Hughes, an anthropologist specialising in social stereotypes, decides to re-examine the case and, in doing so, uncovers a plethora of dark secrets that could lead him into a confrontation with a psychotic killer.
