= The Tinder Box (novella) =

1999 crime novella by Minette Walters

- First edition (Dutch)
- Author: Minette Walters
- Original title: De Tondeldoos
- Language: Dutch, later English
- Genre: crime / mystery
- Publisher: De Boekerij (Netherlands); Macmillan Publishers (UK)
- Publication date: 1999 (Netherlands), 31 July 2004 (Britain)
- Publication place: United Kingdom
- Media type: Print (Hardcover, Paperback) & Audio CD
- Pages: 124 pp (hardback)
- ISBN: 1-4050-4855-7
- OCLC: 59272902

The Tinder Box is a 1999 crime novella by English writer Minette Walters. First published in Dutch as part of their annual "BookWeek" scheme, the story wasn't available in English until 2004.

== Synopsis ==
Following the savage murders of Lavinia Fanshaw and her personal nurse, Dorothy Jenkins, in the small Hampshire village of Sowerbridge, Irish labourer Patrick O'Riordian is arrested for the crime, stirring up violent racial hatred from the other residents against his family. Friend and neighbour Siobhan Lavenham suspects that Patrick was the victim of an already prejudiced investigation, and defies her community so she can prove him innocent. However, after learning of some terrible secret's from the O'Riordian's past, she begins to question her loyalties.
