= The Ice House (novel) =

1992 crime novel by Minette Walters

- First edition (UK)
- Author: Minette Walters
- Cover artist: Neal Phillips (photographer)
- Language: English
- Genre: Crime novel
- Publisher: Macmillan Publishers; St Martins Press (US)
- Publication date: 26 June 1992
- Publication place: United Kingdom
- Media type: Print (Hardcover, Paperback) & Audio CD
- Pages: 416 pp (paperback)
- ISBN: 0-330-32791-7
- OCLC: 60058818

The Ice House is the first crime novel by English writer Minette Walters published in 1992. The story was the recipient of a John Creasey award for best debut.

== Synopsis ==
Mrs Phoebe Maybury, a widow in her late thirties, lives in Streech Grange with her two companions Diana and Anne. One day her servant Fred finds a rotting corpse in their ice house, a storage room inside a hillock that hasn't been used for years.

DCI George Walsh thinks it may be the corpse of Phoebe's husband David, who went missing ten years ago. Back then, Walsh suspected her of killing her husband, but this was never proven.

Inhabitants of the village believe that the three women are lesbians, and that Phoebe did not only kill her husband but also her parents. They died in a car crash after garage owner KC neglected to check their brakes. One of the villagers, Dily Barnes, has forbidden her children Peter and Emma to play with Phoebe's children Jonathan and Jane.

The grounds are searched and the three women and Phoebe's grown-up children are questioned. Jane used to have anorexia nervosa and underwent psychotherapy. DS Andy McLoughlin, whose wife has just left him for another police officer, gets romantically involved with Anne and believes the three women are innocent.

Medical examiner Webster says the corpse can only be between two and three months old. A list of missing persons includes the names Keith Chapel and Daniel Thompson. Thompson's wife is interrogated. It turns out he collected money from investors to produce see-through radiators. One of the duped investors was Diana.

One night a burglar in Streech Grange smashes Anne's skull. She recovers in hospital, but doesn't remember who attacked her.

It turns out, that Daniel Thompson is still alive. He was hiding from the angry investors and wanted to move to France with his wife.

Wally Ferris, a tramp who was seen in the environment, confesses he's been in the ice house and stole the clothes of a dead man. The dead man is finally identified as Keith Chapel or KC, the former garage owner who went bankrupt. Chapel died from the cold and part of his flesh was eaten by rats after Wally left open the door of the ice house.

It is also revealed, that (ten years ago) DCI Walsh tried to blackmail Phoebe into becoming his mistress in exchange for stopping the investigation. She refused, so in revenge, he spread subtle hints that she killed her husband but got away with it, leading to her isolation and distrust from the village.

A group of burglars is caught at Streech Grange. After Jonathan fires a gun between Peter Barnes' legs he confesses that he smashed Anne's skull. Peter was instigated by the nasty gossip of his mother and other villagers.

When the three women are left in McLoughlin's company they talk openly about how Phoebe killed her husband almost ten years ago. She initially caught him abusing Jane. This and his financial trouble let him to leave Streech Grange, but he returned a couple of months later. Meanwhile, vandals from the village had terrorized the three women and the children, so when David sneaked into the house, Phoebe smashed his skull thinking he was one of them. They buried his corpse behind a wall in the cellar. McLoughlin decides to help them get rid of the remains for good, so that they can move on. He also plans to start a new life with Anne.

== Main characters ==
- Mrs Phoebe Maybury: tenant of Streech Grange, David Maybury's widow
- Mrs Diana Goode: companion of Phoebe, divorced interior designer
- Miss Anne Cattrell: companion of Phoebe, journalist
- Jonathan Maybury: Phoebe's twenty-year-old son
- Jane Maybury: Phoebe's eighteen-year-old daughter
- Elizabeth Goode: Diana's daughter
- Fred Phillips: servant
- Molly Phillips: Fred's wife, servant
- Dily Barnes: old woman in the village
- Peter Barnes: Dily's son
- Emma Barnes: Dily's daughter
- Paddy Clarke: landlord of the local pub
- Eddie Staines: farmhand
- Wally Ferris: tramp
- Keith Chapel: missing person
- Daniel Thompson: missing person
- DCI George Walsh
- DS Andy McLoughlin
- DS Nick Robinson
- Dr Jim Webster: medical examiner

== Television adaptation ==
In 1997, this story was adapted for television by the BBC. The cast featured Penny Downie as Phoebe, Kitty Aldridge as Anne and Frances Barber as Diana. Corin Redgrave and Daniel Craig played Walsh and McLoughlin.
