= The Shape of Snakes =

2000 novel by Minette Walters

- First edition
- Author: Minette Walters
- Language: English
- Genre: Crime / Mystery novel
- Publisher: Macmillan Publishers
- Publication date: 20 October 2000
- Publication place: United Kingdom
- Media type: Print (Hardcover, Paperback) & Audio CD
- Pages: 400 pp (hardback)
- ISBN: 0-333-74860-3
- OCLC: 59579278

The Shape of Snakes is a crime novel by English writer Minette Walters published in 2000. The story won Denmark's Pelle Rosencrantz Award.

== Synopsis ==
In 1978, a black woman known as 'Mad Annie' by her neighbours was found dead in a west London gutter, her body discovered by Mrs. Ranelagh who, despite supposedly not knowing the dead woman, spends the next twenty years trying to convince the police that she was murdered. However, those once familiar with Annie despised her as a mean old eccentric and animal abuser, whilst Ranelagh's husband seemingly disdains any mention of the case.
