= List of British films of 1998 =

A list of British films released in 1998.

== 1998 ==
Title	Director	Cast	Genre	Notes
1998
Among Giants	Sam Miller	Pete Postlethwaite, Rachel Griffiths, James Thornton	Drama	
B. Monkey	Michael Radford	Asia Argento, Rupert Everett, Jonathan Rhys Meyers	Crime	
Basil	Radha Bharadwaj	Jared Leto, Claire Forlani, Christian Slater	Drama	
Bedrooms and Hallways	Rose Troche	Kevin McKidd, Harriet Walter, James Purefoy, Hugo Weaving	Comedy drama	
Besieged	Bernardo Bertolucci	Thandie Newton, David Thewlis	Drama	
The Big Lebowski	Joel Coen	Jeff Bridges, John Goodman, Julianne Moore, Steve Buscemi, David Huddleston, John Turturro, Philip Seymour Hoffman	Independent crime comedy	
The Big Swap	Niall Johnson	Mark Adams, Sorcha Brooks, Mark Caven, Alison Egan	Sexual drama	
The Brylcreem Boys	Terence Ryan	Billy Campbell, Angus Macfadyen	Historical drama	
Cats	David Mallet	Elaine Paige, John Mills, Ken Page	Musical	
Cider with Rosie	Charles Beeson	Juliet Stevenson, David Troughton, Laurie Lee	Drama	
The Commissioner	George Sluizer	John Hurt, Rosana Pastor	Drama	
Cousin Bette	Des McAnuff	Jessica Lange, Bob Hoskins	Comedy	
Crossmaheart	Henry Herbert	Gerard Rooney, Maria Lennon	Drama	
Croupier	Mike Hodges	Clive Owen, Alex Kingston	Drama	
Dad Savage	Betsan Morris Evans	Patrick Stewart, Kevin McKidd	Crime/thriller	
Dancing at Lughnasa	Pat O'Connor	Meryl Streep, Michael Gambon	Drama	
Divorcing Jack	David Caffrey	David Thewlis, Jason Isaacs	Comedy	
Eight	Stephen Daldry	Jack Langan-Evans, Gina McKee	Sports	Short film
Elizabeth	Shekhar Kapur	Cate Blanchett, Geoffrey Rush, Christopher Eccleston, Richard Attenborough, Daniel Craig	Historical drama	
Final Cut	Dominic Anciano, Ray Burdis	Ray Winstone, Jude Law	Drama	
The General	John Boorman	Brendan Gleeson, Adrian Dunbar, Jon Voight	Crime drama	
Get Real	Simon Shore	Ben Silverstone, Brad Gorton	Drama	
Girls' Night	Nick Hurran	Julie Walters, Brenda Blethyn		Entered into the 48th Berlin International Film Festival
Gods and Monsters	Bill Condon	Ian McKellen, Brendan Fraser, Lynn Redgrave	Biopic	Life of James Whale
Good Night Mister Tom	Jack Gold	John Thaw, Nick Robinson		TV film
The Governess	Sandra Goldbacher	Minnie Driver, Tom Wilkinson	Drama	
Hideous Kinky	Gillies MacKinnon	Kate Winslet, Saïd Taghmaoui	Romance	
Hilary and Jackie	Anand Tucker	Emily Watson, Rachel Griffiths, James Frain	Biopic	
Humdrum	Peter Peake	Moray Hunter, Jack Docherty	Comedy	Animated short
I Want You	Michael Winterbottom	Rachel Weisz, Alessandro Nivola	Crime drama	
Jinnah	Jamil Dehlavi	Christopher Lee, Shashi Kapoor, James Fox	Biopic	
Killing Time	Bharat Nalluri	Craig Fairbrass, Nigel Leach, Kendra Torgan	Crime/thriller	
Kurt & Courtney	Nick Broomfield		Documentary	
The Land Girls	David Leland	Catherine McCormack, Rachel Weisz	Drama	
Little Voice	Mark Herman	Michael Caine, Jane Horrocks	Drama/musical	
Lock, Stock and Two Smoking Barrels	Guy Ritchie	Jason Flemyng, Dexter Fletcher	Crime/thriller	
Love and Rage	Cathal Black	Greta Scacchi, Daniel Craig, Stephen Dillane	Drama	
Love is the Devil	John Maybury	Derek Jacobi, Daniel Craig	Biopic	
Lucia	Don Boyd	Amanda Boyd, John Daszak	Drama	
The Man with Rain in His Shoes	María Ripoll	Lena Headey, Douglas Henshall, Penélope Cruz	Rom com	
Martha, Meet Frank, Daniel and Laurence	Nick Hamm	Monica Potter, Rufus Sewell	Romance/comedy	
Meeting People Is Easy	Grant Gee	Radiohead	Documentary	
Monk Dawson	Tom Waller	John Michie, Benedict Taylor, Paula Hamilton Mark Caven	Drama	
My Name Is Joe	Ken Loach	Peter Mullan, David McKay	Drama	Won Best Actor at Cannes
Orphans	Peter Mullan	Douglas Henshall, Gary Lewis, Rosemarie Stevenson	Drama/comedy	
Prometheus	Tony Harrison	Film-poem	Socio-political	
The Red Violin	François Girard	Jason Flemyng, Greta Scacchi	Drama	
The Sea Change	Michael Bray	Sean Chapman, Maryam d'Abo	Comedy	Co-production with Spain
Shakespeare in Love	John Madden	Gwyneth Paltrow, Joseph Fiennes, Geoffrey Rush, Colin Firth, Ben Affleck, Judi Dench, Simon Callow, Jim Carter, Martin Clunes, Antony Sher, Imelda Staunton, Tom Wilkinson, Mark Williams	Period romantic comedy	Co-production with the US
Side Streets	Tony Gerber	Shashi Kapoor, Shabana Azmi, Valeria Golino, Art Malik, Miho Nikaido, Jennifer Esposito, Victor Argo, Rosario Dawson	Drama	
Sliding Doors	Peter Howitt	Gwyneth Paltrow, John Hannah	Drama/comedy	
Something to Believe In	John Hough	William McNamara, Maria Pitillo	Drama	Co-production with Germany
Stiff Upper Lips	Gary Sinyor	Sean Pertwee, Georgina Cates, Prunella Scales	Comedy	
Still Crazy	Brian Gibson	Stephen Rea, Billy Connolly, Bill Nighy	Comedy	
The Stringer	Paweł Pawlikowski	Sergey Bodrov, Anna Friel, Vladimir Ilyin	Action/drama	Co-production with Russia
Tale of the Mummy	Russell Mulcahy	Jason Scott Lee, Louise Lombard	Horror	
Three Businessmen	Alex Cox	Miguel Sandoval, Alex Cox	Surreal comedy	
The Tichborne Claimant	David Yates	Robert Pugh, John Kani	Drama	
Titanic Town	Roger Michell	Julie Walters, Ciarán Hinds	Drama	
Up 'n' Under	John Godber	Gary Olsen, Richard Ridings, Samantha Janus	Comedy	
Velvet Goldmine	Todd Haynes	Ewan McGregor, Jonathan Rhys-Meyers, Christian Bale	Drama	
Vigo: A Passion for Life	Julien Temple	James Frain, Romane Bohringer	Drama	
Waking Ned	Kirk Jones	Ian Bannen, David Kelly, Fionnula Flanagan	Comedy	
What Rats Won't Do	Alastair Reid	James Frain, Natascha McElhone	Comedy	
Woundings	Roberta Hanley	Guy Pearce, Ray Winstone	Drama	

== See also ==
- 1998 in film
- 1998 in British music
- 1998 in British radio
- 1998 in British television
- 1998 in the United Kingdom
- List of 1998 box office number-one films in the United Kingdom
