= Fox Evil =

2002 novel by Minette Walters

- First edition
- Author: Minette Walters
- Language: English
- Genre: Crime / Mystery novel
- Publisher: Macmillan Publishers
- Publication date: 8 November 2002
- Publication place: United Kingdom
- Media type: Print (Hardcover, Paperback) & Audio CD
- Pages: 384 pp (hardback)
- ISBN: 1-4050-0109-7
- OCLC: 50527053
- Preceded by: Acid Row
- Followed by: Disordered Minds

Fox Evil is a 2002 novel by British crime-writer Minette Walters. It won the Crime Writers' Association Gold Dagger in 2003, making her one of the few writers to win the award more than once.
