= The Chameleon's Shadow =

2007 novel by Minette Walters

- First edition cover
- Author: Minette Walters
- Language: English
- Genre: Crime / Mystery novel
- Publisher: Macmillan
- Publication date: 7 September 2007
- Publication place: United Kingdom
- Media type: Print (Hardcover)
- Pages: 400 pp
- ISBN: 0-230-01566-2
- OCLC: 86166578

The Chameleon's Shadow is a 2007 crime novel by English writer Minette Walters.

== Plot ==
Charles Acland, a British soldier returns home from the war in Iraq suffering from migraines, depression, and paranoia. A traumatic head injury has left him with a facial disfigurement. He goes to the Doctor to be treated to help him adjust to civilian life, but to no avail. He remains lonely, angry and violent. Because of his aggressive personality, he soon finds himself a suspect in a series of murders in London.
