= 1921 in British radio =

This is a list of events from British radio in 1921.

== Events ==
- 1 June – The Epsom Derby horse race is for the first time broadcast live by wireless.

== Births ==
- 17 February – Ken Platt, Lancashire comedian (d. 1998)
- 25 February – Patricia Ryan, English-born American child actress, continues performing on radio until her death (d. 1949)
- 7 March – Eleanor Summerfield, actress and radio panel show member (d. 2001)
- 21 March – Antony Hopkins, British composer, pianist, conductor and music broadcaster (d. 2014)
- 1 April – Steve Race, English pianist-composer and radio presenter (d. 2009)
- 23 May – Humphrey Lyttelton, English jazz trumpeter and radio presenter (d. 2008)
- 28 June – Ronnie Taylor, English broadcast comedy scriptwriter and producer (d. 1979)
- 21 September – Jimmy Young, English singer and broadcaster (d. 2016)
- 24 December – Jimmy Clitheroe, Lancashire comic entertainer (d. 1973)
