= The Devil's Feather =

2005 psychological thriller and crime novel by Minette Walters

- First edition
- Author: Minette Walters
- Language: English
- Genre: Crime / Mystery novel
- Publisher: Macmillan
- Publication date: 8 September 2005
- Publication place: United Kingdom
- Media type: Print (Hardcover, Paperback) & Audio CD
- Pages: 416 pp (hardback)
- ISBN: 1-4050-5098-5
- OCLC: 60741276
- Dewey Decimal: 823/.914 22
- LC Class: PR6073.A444 D48 2005

The Devil's Feather is a 2005 psychological thriller and crime novel by British author Minette Walters.

== Plot ==
Connie Burns is a British-Zimbabwean journalist working as a war correspondent for the Reuters agency. While stationed in Sierra Leone in 2002 she reports on the case of five women who have been brutally murdered. Burns suspects a British mercenary, who is known throughout the expatriate community for his brutality and violence. She encounters the mercenary again two years later while based in Baghdad to cover the Iraq conflict. She begins to make discrete enquiries about him, but is frightened off by a series of incidents in which her hotel room is repeatedly ransacked. Deciding to return to the United Kingdom, Burns is kidnapped on her way to the airport, but released three days later.

Upon her release, Burns returns to England, avoiding reporters (including her former Reuters colleagues) who are keen to hear about her ordeal. Leasing a remote house on the Dorset coast she sets about trying to guard her privacy and her security. But escaping her past proves to be more difficult. She befriends a local woman named Jess Derbyshire, a reclusive woman who has isolated herself from her community following a family tragedy. Seeing parallels between herself and Jess, Burns borrows from the other woman's strength and makes the hazardous decision to take on her adversary for a third time.

== Reception ==
Publishers Weekly praised the author saying she "delivers an intense, engrossingly structured tour de force about survival and "the secret of freedom, courage.""

While Kirkus deliver a bold review stating "Genteel and horrifying as ever, with a particularly unsparing examination of the rage of traumatized victims."
