= EastEnders in Paris =

- EastEnders episodes
- World Cup title card, that depicts landmarks in Paris.
- Episode nos.: Episodes 1638A–C
- Directed by: John Derek
- Written by: Sarah Harding
- Editing by: David Rees
- Production codes: BBC LDXK831D; BBC 809066; BBC LDXK833R
- Original air date: 10 July 1998 – 12 July 1998
- Running time: 35 minutes (1×15 min, 2×10 min)

Episode chronology
← Previous; Episode 1637/1638	Next → Episode 1639

"EastEnders in Paris" (also known as "EastEnders: Paris Specials") is a three-episode special of the BBC soap opera EastEnders that was broadcast in the United Kingdom on BBC One on 10, 11, and 12 July 1998. The episodes coincided with the real-life events of the 1998 FIFA World Cup, with part three being broadcast as a segment within the BBC's coverage of the World Cup final itself. It was written by Sarah Harding, directed by John Derek, and executively produced by Matthew Robinson and Mal Young. The special focuses on Barry (Shaun Williamson), Robbie (Dean Gaffney), Huw (Richard Elis) and Lenny (Desune Coleman) finding a way to get to the 1998 FIFA World Cup. It also includes Roy (Tony Caunter) and Pat (Pam St Clement) sightseeing in Paris. The episodes received an average viewership of 7.87 million in the United Kingdom.

== Plot ==
=== Part one ===
At Waterloo International railway station, Roy and Pat, who have two tickets to the FIFA World Cup final, are on their way to France via the Eurostar. Having rented a van, Barry, Robbie, Huw and Lenny are already there but become lost due to Robbie choosing to drink alcohol rather than give directions. The group need to reach Paris by 9.30 to pick up tickets for the World Cup from Charlie, who is selling them to Barry. On the Eurostar, Pat is becoming annoyed by excited football fans singing chants. Reminding her that it is the World Cup and that even more fans will be in Paris, Roy reassures her that they can still have a nice time. Meanwhile, the group's van has suddenly broken down, requiring the men to push it to the side of the road and find help. Lenny goes into a local bar and tries to speak French to a waitress called Karen. Laughing at his poor attempt, she replies in English.

Now in France but unable to get a taxi, Pat and Roy walk down a street but Roy sees Barry hanging out of his van, so he rushes Pat into their hotel, Hotel Madison, to avoid her seeing Barry. In their room, Roy moans about the room size and the view from their windows. The men reach the bar where they plan to meet Charlie and he is already waiting and angry as they are 20 minutes late. Barry asks if he still has the four tickets he wanted but Charlie says that Barry only asked for two and that he can collect them the next day. The next morning, Roy moans about the size of the bathroom, but Pat tells him that as long as the room is clean and the bed is firm, then it is fine. The men wake up in the van and Barry brings them croissants and coffee as he feels guilty about only getting two tickets.

=== Part two ===
Pat and Roy come out of the Louvre museum. Roy is enjoying it, but Pat remarks that the Louvre Pyramid looks like a greenhouse. Pat is getting tired of Roy's quick stop tours and asks Roy to slow down. Barry admits to Robbie there are only two tickets, and he has chosen him to have the other. In the bar, Robbie has told Huw and Lenny about the tickets and everyone is annoyed at Barry, so Lenny suggests they draw lots to see who will get a ticket.

Roy gives Pat a tour of the Notre Dame, but Pat is still having difficulties keeping up. Roy then walks past the Eiffel Tower without saying anything. Roy explains that Les Invalides houses the remains of Napoleon and points out a statue of The Thinker but says nothing to Pat. They return to their hotel.

In the bar, Charlie gives Barry the tickets and the men draw straws; Huw and Lenny win the tickets. As they come out of the bar, they see their van being driven away by thieves. With nowhere to sleep, they go to Hotel Madison and knock on Roy and Pat's hotel room door. Roy opens the door and is horrified to see them.

=== Part three ===
In the hotel restaurant, Pat is outraged that Barry is in France and that Roy did not tell her. Pat says it is bad enough thinking of having to go home to Barry without having to share a hotel room with him and the others. Robbie and Huw thank Roy for allowing them spend the night in his hotel room. In a bar, a French woman asks if she can sit next to Robbie, and Robbie becomes love-stricken.

Barry is wallowing, saying that he has always wanted to see the World Cup Final, but as usual things have conspired against him. Roy gives Barry his two tickets for the World Cup Final and tells him to enjoy it. Roy then apologises to Pat. Barry finds Robbie and tells him they are going to the final as he has another two tickets, and several people try to buy the tickets from Barry.

Roy shows Pat The Kiss, a sculpture depicting two people kissing. Roy wishes he could just tell Pat how much he loves her and realises that he is blessed for having her. Pat acknowledges that Roy did the right thing by helping Barry and she says she is glad that they are in the most romantic city on Earth; Pat kisses Roy. At the stadium, everyone is excited for the final. Barry and Robbie show Lenny and Huw their tickets, and they all go in together to watch the match.

== Cast and characters ==
- Tony Caunter as Roy Evans
- Pam St Clement as Pat Evans
- Desune Coleman as Lenny Wallace
- Richard Elis as Huw Edwards
- Dean Gaffney as Robbie Jackson
- Shaun Williamson as Barry Evans
- Francois Brunet as Charlie
- Paula Jane Ulrich as Karen (credited as "Waitress")

== Production ==
The special episodes were announced on 2 June 1998, on which a BBC spokeswoman called them "unprecedented and very exciting", adding that viewers would have "the opportunity to go [to France] with their favourite soap and see what is happening in Paris during the World Cup at the same time." It was originally reported that there would be a single hour-long special episode and that it would be shown around the time of the World Cup Final.

At the time of the announcement, it was not known which countries would be competing at the final, but the characters were reported to be supporting England, apart from Welshman Huw, who decides to support Scotland. The scenes were filmed two weeks from the time of the announcement being made, which is much nearer to transmission than most EastEnders' episodes, but it was too early to include the finalists in the specials, so it was reported that the drama would take place away from any football match. It was reported that Barry's van would be "on its last legs" and their tickets would be "uncertain", making their trip "far from smooth". Shaun Williamson said of his character Barry, "He's already been the victim of a conwoman. Let's just hope his dodgy source for tickets shows up in Paris." It was also reported that Pat would be unhappy with her trip, and Pam St. Clement said of her character, "She isn't the world's biggest football fan and she could think of far more romantic things to be doing in Paris."

The cast and crew spent four days in France filming the specials and the producers hoped that France would make it to the final to fit in with crowd scenes they had already filmed during the home nation's quarter-final tie with Italy. On 24 June 1998, it was confirmed that the episode following the specials would have two outcomes filmed, with one showing the returning characters celebrating England being successful and the other England being sent home early.

=== On-location filming ===
Roy takes Pat on a tour of Paris and they visit the below landmarks. They also stay in Hotel Madison, seen behind the Denis Diderot statue.

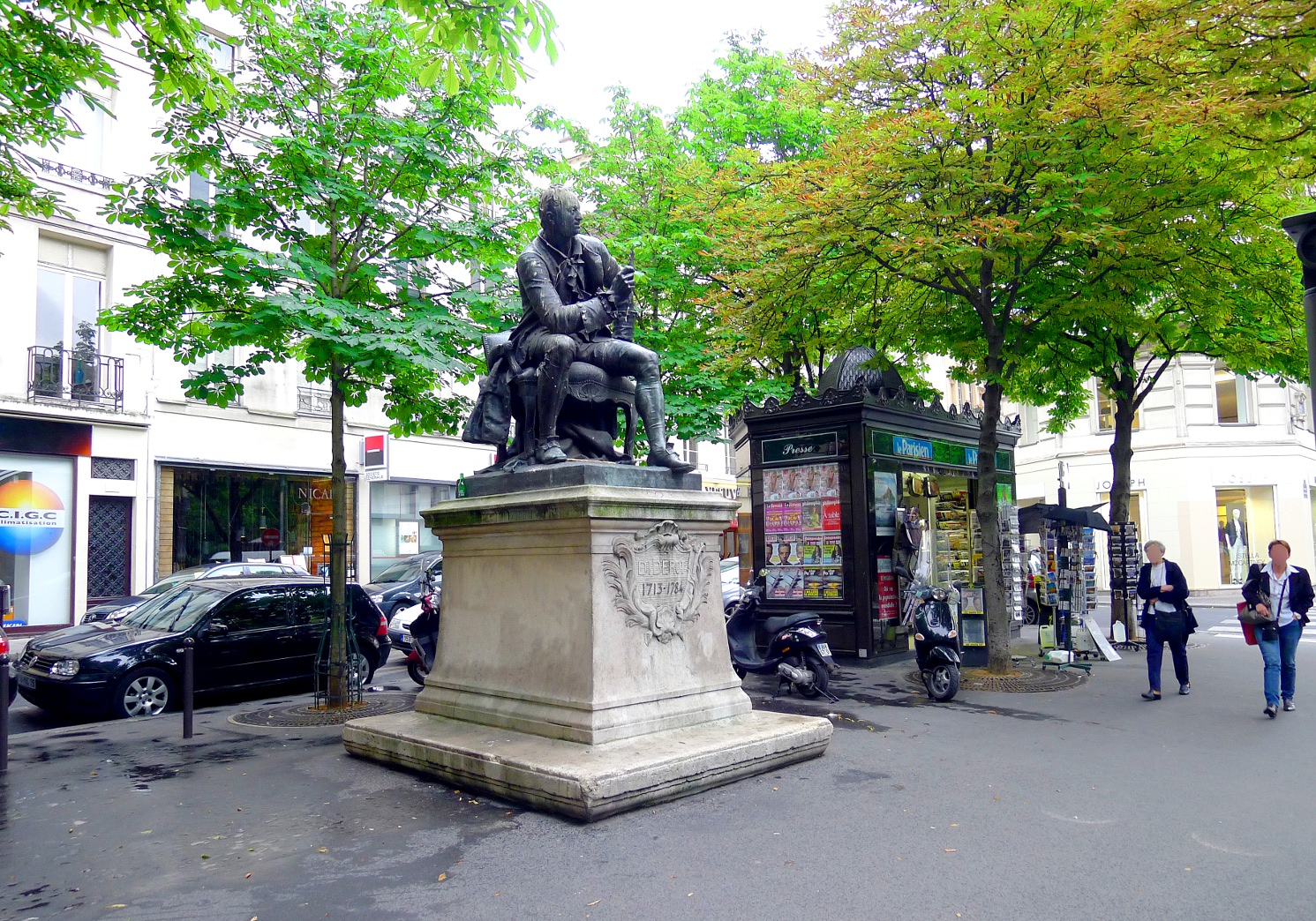
Statue of Denis Diderot by Jean Gautherin

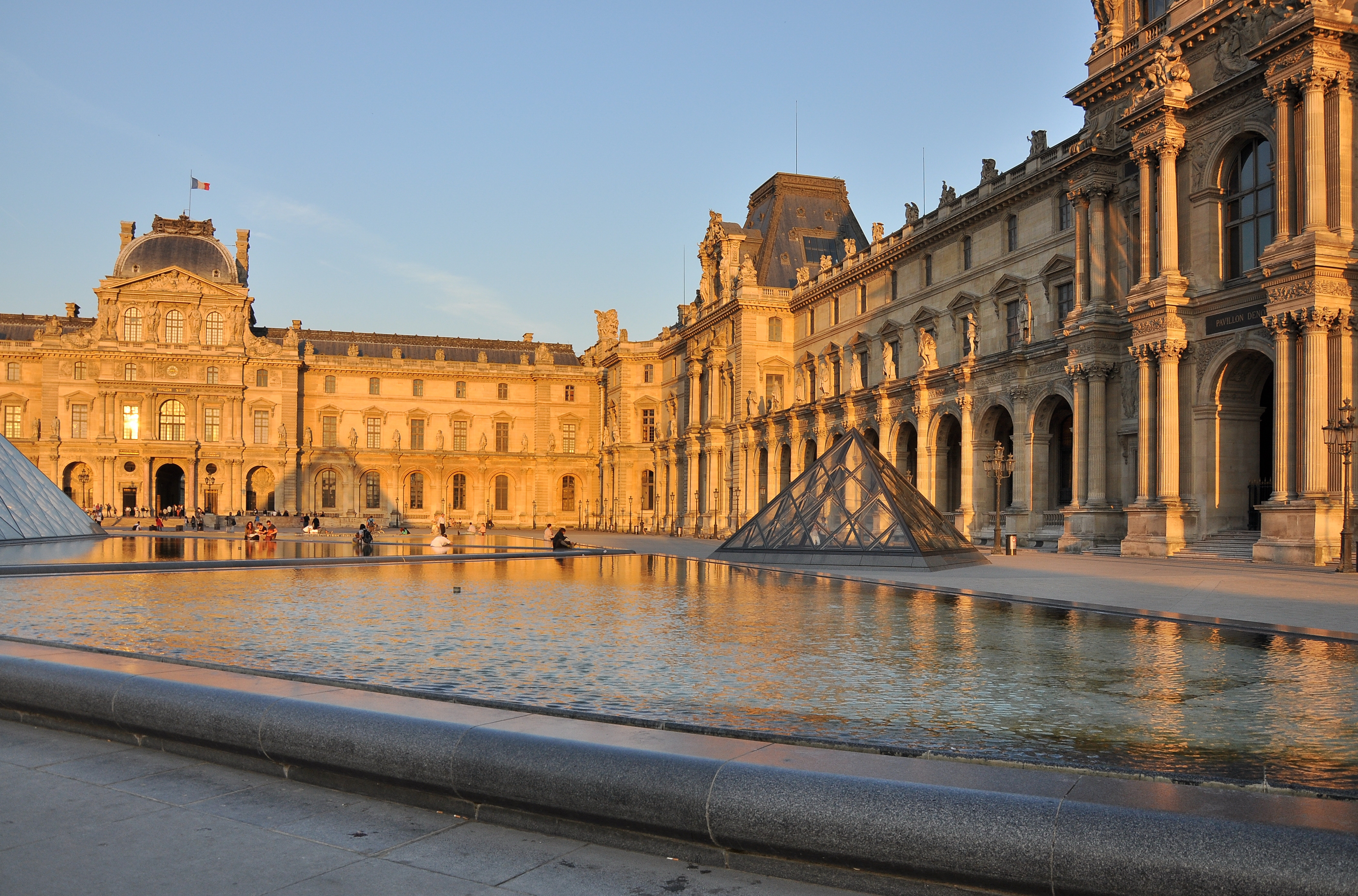
The Louvre

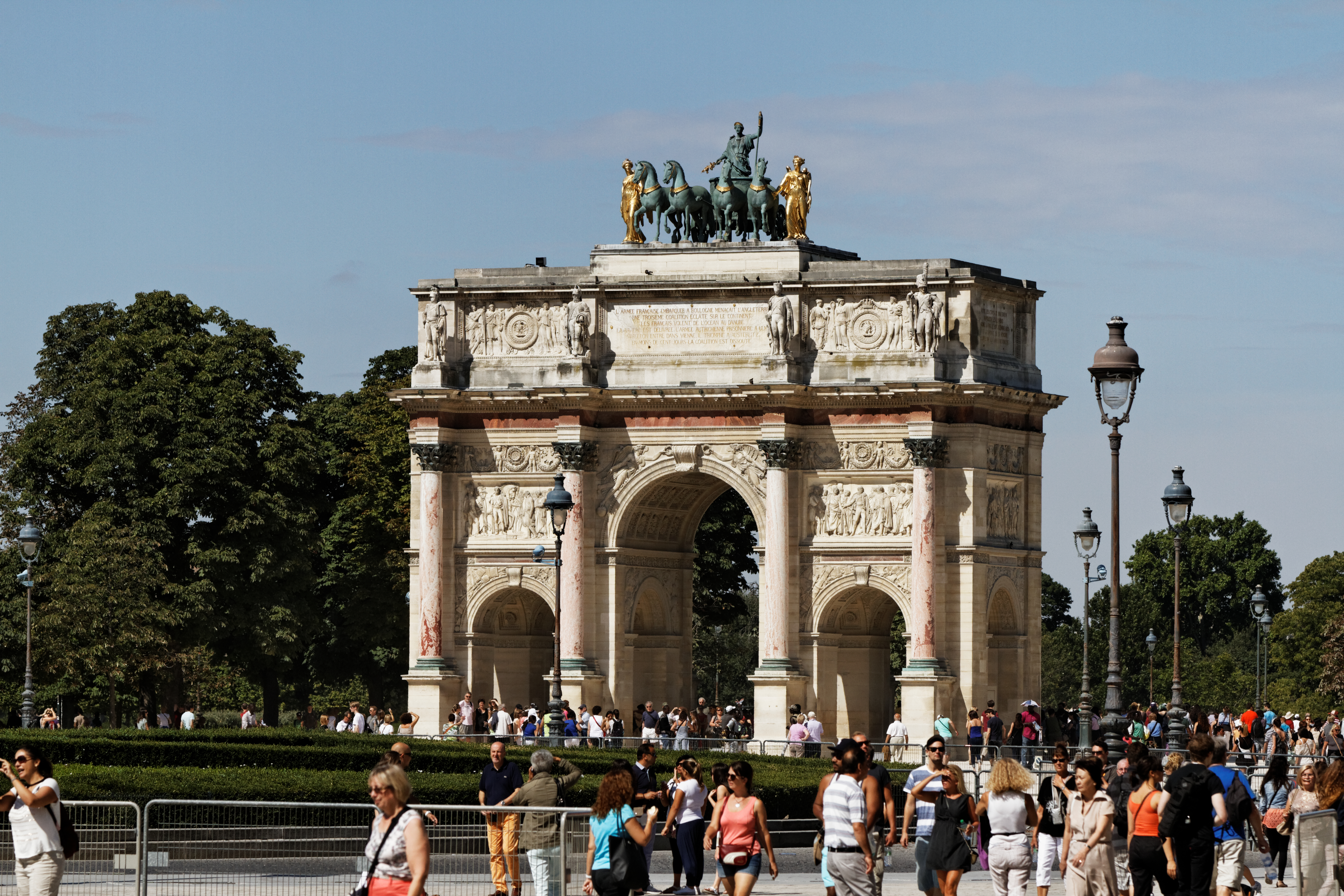
Arc de Triomphe du Carrousel

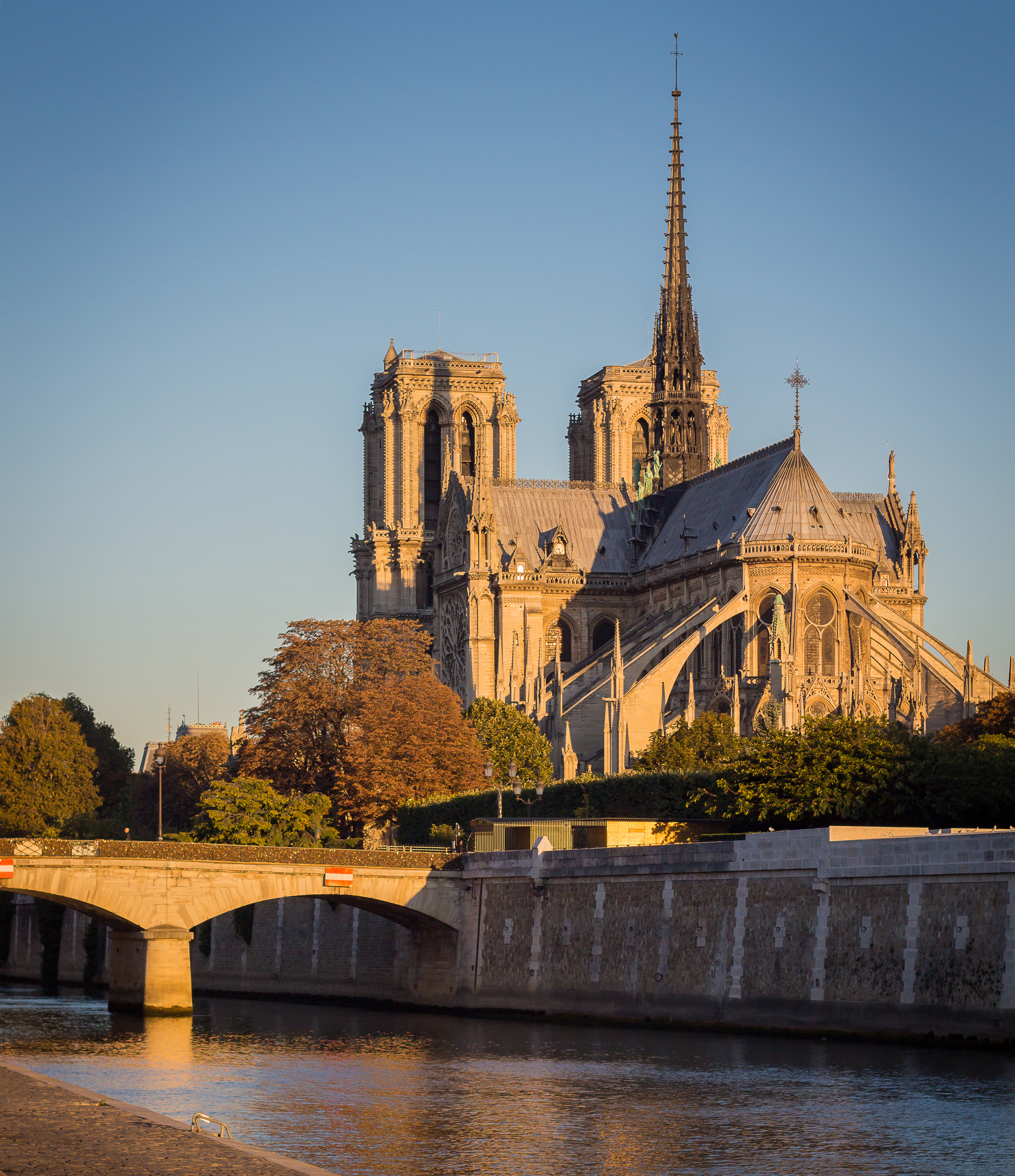
Notre-Dame Cathedral

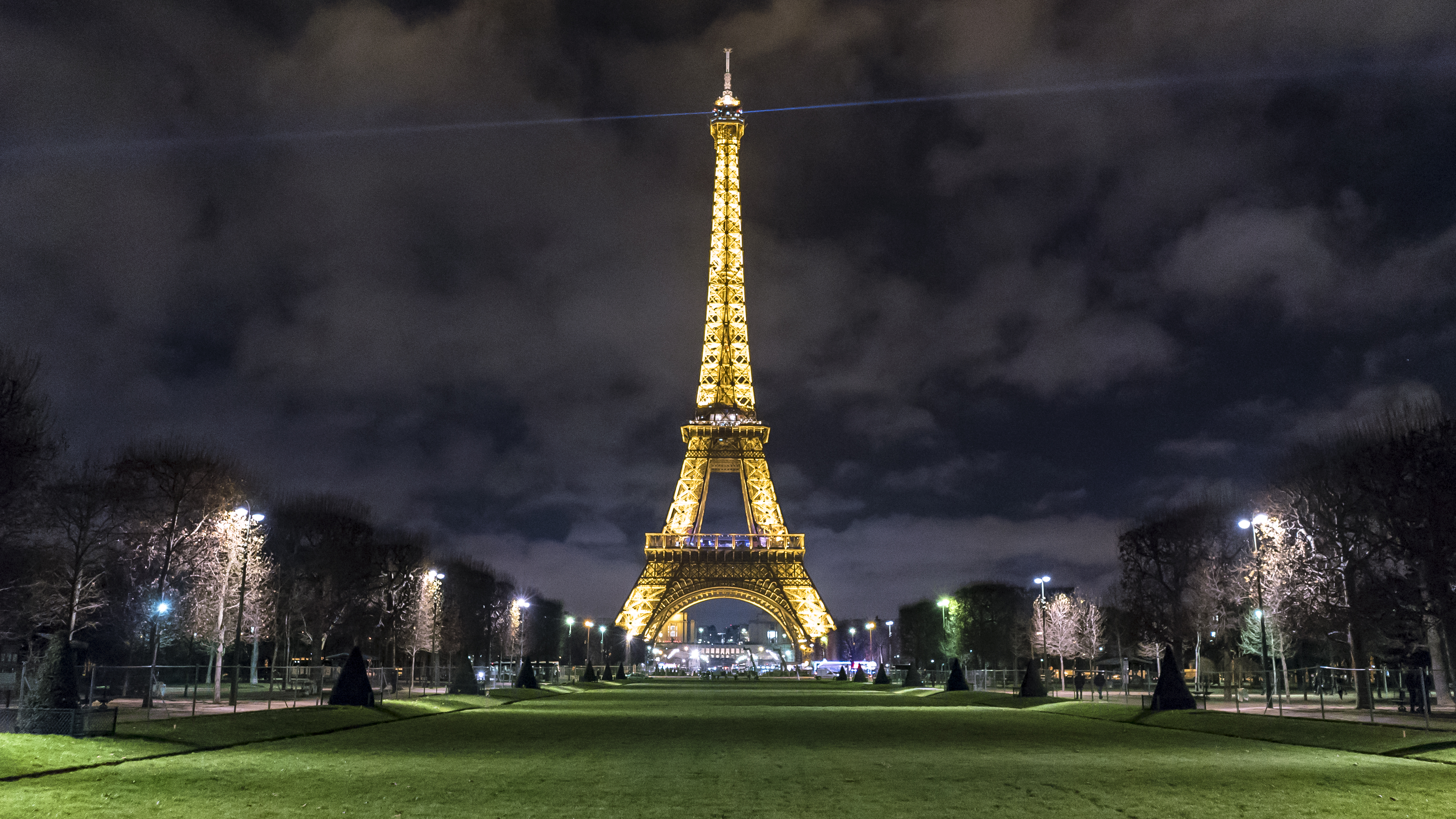
Eiffel Tower

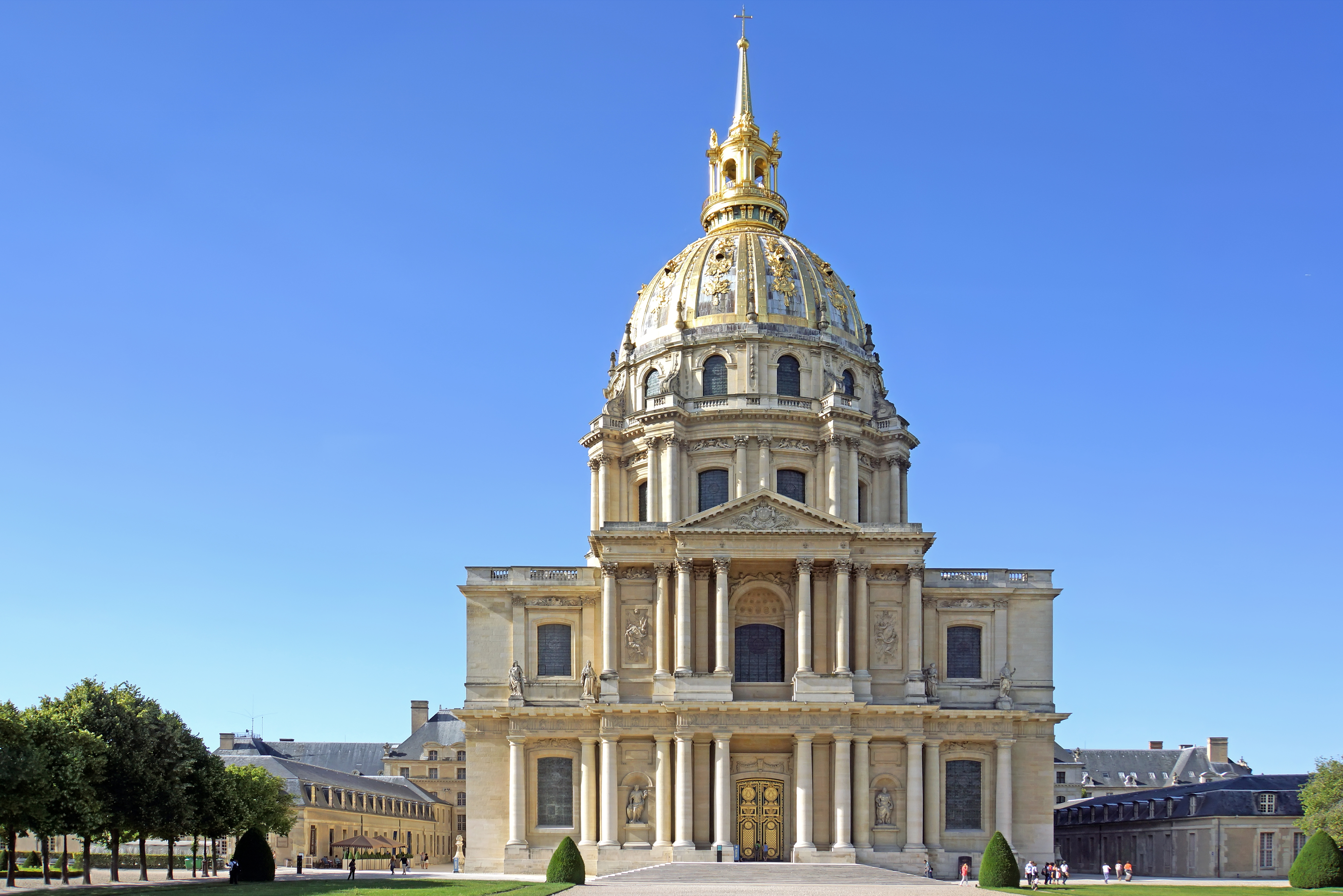
Les Invalides

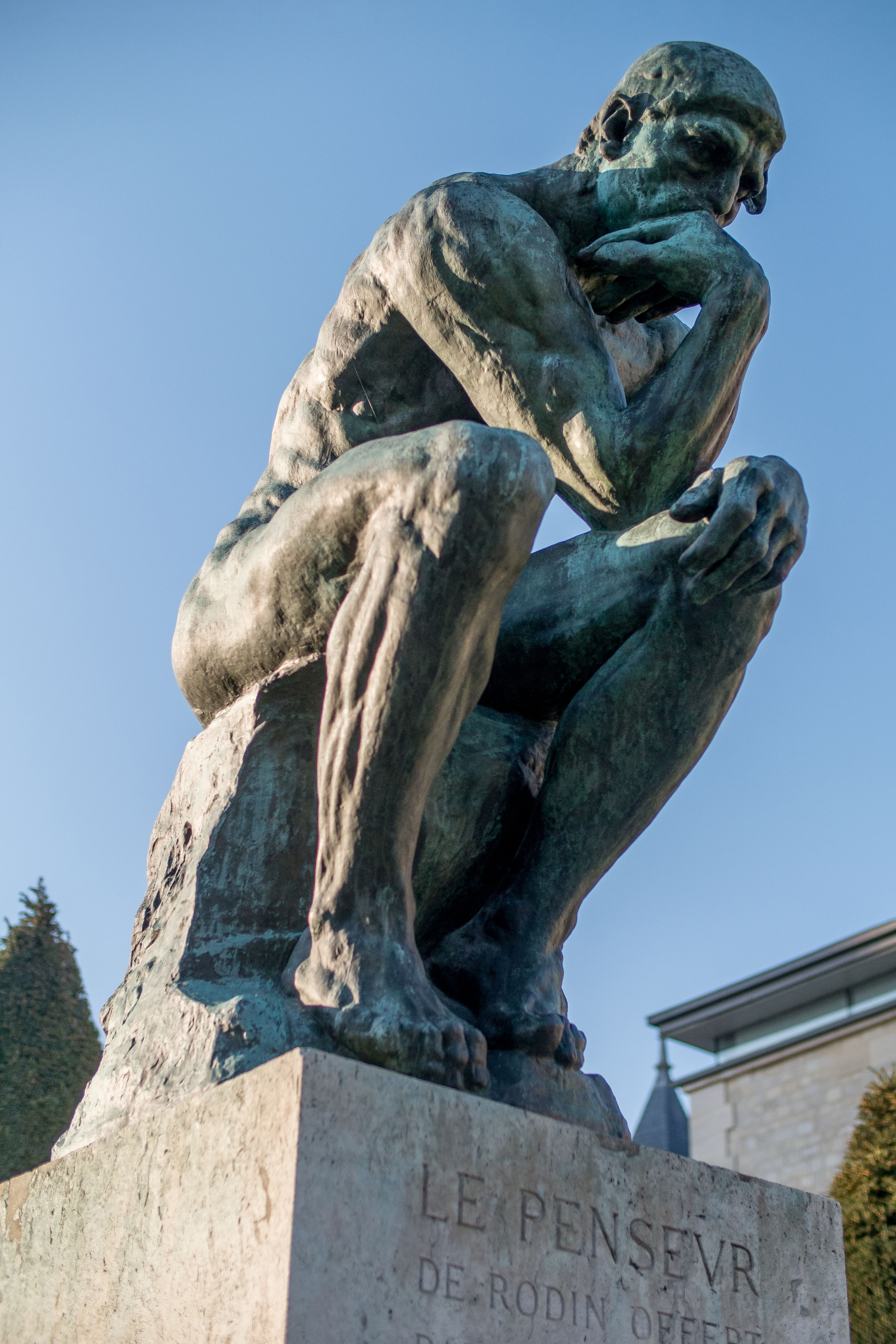
The Thinker

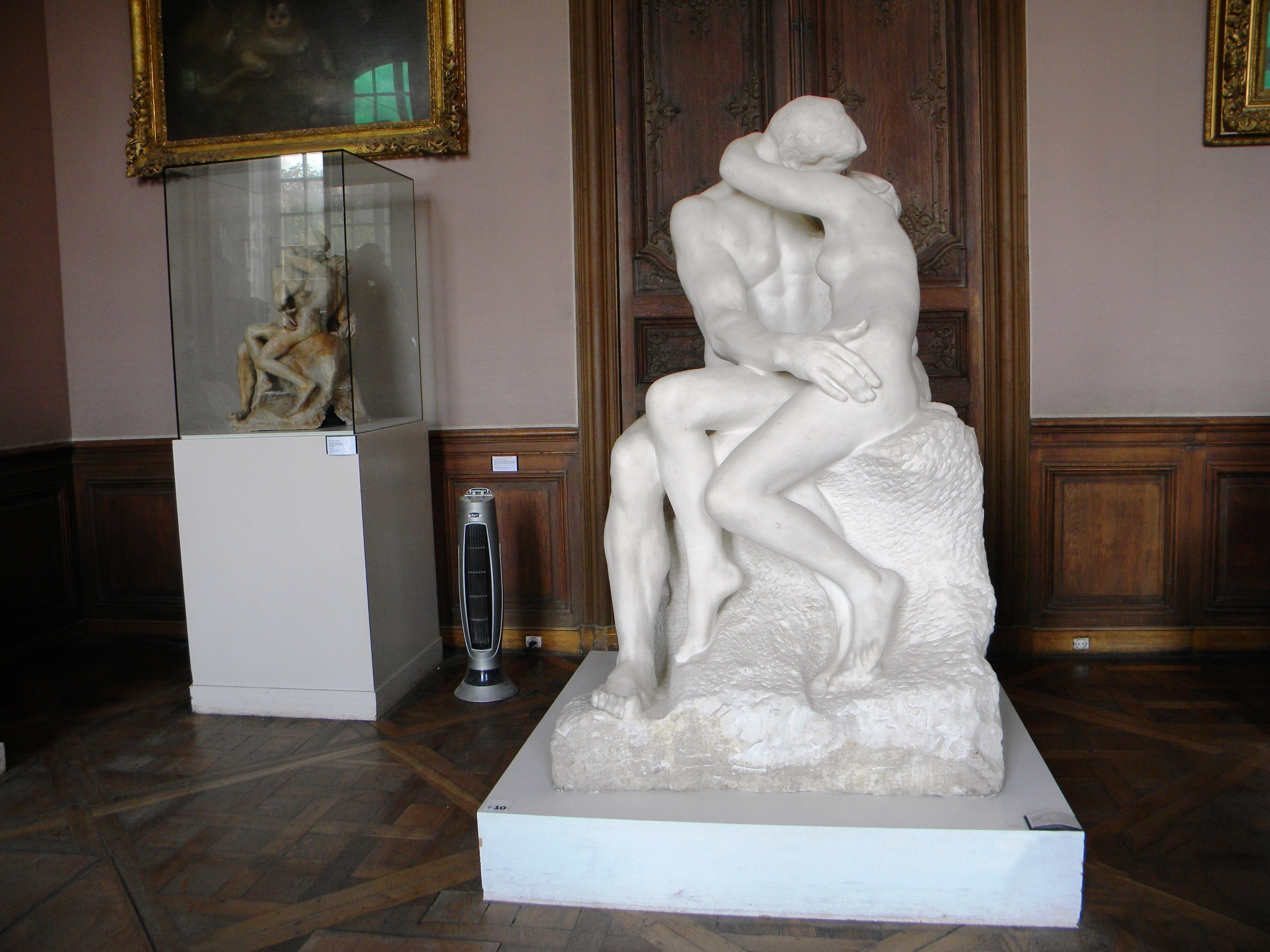
The Kiss

== Reception ==
Official ratings from the Broadcasters' Audience Research Board showed that the three mini episodes gained 9.82, 8.38 and 5.43 million viewers respectively. ITV soap Coronation Street also broadcast a World Cup special episode with characters preparing to watch the final, which achieved 13.29 million viewers. However, a BBC spokeswoman said it was "completely unrealistic to compare the unconfirmed viewing figures of EastEnders' short episode with a 50-minute special for Coronation Street."

Tom Shields from The Herald said, "Scanning the schedules for World Cup final day, we find the British Broadcasting Corporation chose to intrude an EastEnders special with a storyline which sent sundry thick and oafish characters to Paris. The reality is they would have been turned back by the police at the channel ports. The reality, also, is that we are paying licence fees to promote the strident and unacceptable voice of Engerland [sic]." Shields went on to say that the last special, shown before the World Cup final started, had "interrupted a rather entertaining preview from Des Lynam and the pundits". Tony Purnell from the Daily Mirror said of the specials, "It must have seemed like a good idea at the time. A change is as good as a rest and all that. But I've said it before and I'll say it again – EastEnders (BBC1) should stay at home. Going away is always a big mistake."

== See also ==
- List of EastEnders characters (1998)
