= Chickenfeed (novella) =

2006 crime novella by Minette Walters

- Author: Minette Walters
- Language: English
- Genre: Crime / Mystery novel
- Publisher: Pan Books
- Publication date: 3 March 2006
- Publication place: United Kingdom
- Media type: Print (Hardcover, Paperback) & Audio CD
- Pages: 128 pp (paperback edition)
- ISBN: 0-330-44031-4
- OCLC: 62475040

Chickenfeed is a 2006 crime novella by English writer Minette Walters, published as part of the "Quick Reads", designed to promote literacy through short, simply written and fast moving stories.

== Synopsis ==
Based on the real life case of Elsie Cameron, a woman whose body was dismembered by her fiancé, Norman Thorne, who was hanged for her supposed murder in 1924. Walters re-creates the events leading up to Cameron's death and writes from the perspective of both Elsie and Norman, as their relationship slowly turns sour and Norman yearns to be free from Elsie.

In an afterword to the novella, Walters explains her doubts that Cameron's death was actually a murder, and suggests that the assessment of pathologist Bernard Spilsbury on which the death sentence was based was wrong.
