= The Echo (novel) =

1997 novel by Minette Walters

- First edition (UK)
- Author: Minette Walters
- Language: English
- Genre: Crime / Mystery novel
- Publisher: Macmillan Publishers (UK); G.P. Putnam's Sons (US); Allen & Unwin (Aus)
- Publication date: 21 February 1997
- Publication place: United Kingdom
- Media type: Print (Hardcover, Paperback) & Audio CD
- Pages: 343 pp (hardback)
- ISBN: 0-333-65932-5
- OCLC: 36631472

The Echo is the fifth crime novel written by award-winning British crime fiction author Minette Walters and published in 1997. The Echo is a stand-alone (non-series) novel whose characters do not appear in any of her other books. Originally published in English, The Echo has been translated into nine other languages in print and recorded as an e-book in both English and German.

== Synopsis ==
When a homeless man going by the name Billy Blake starves himself to death in the garage of socialite Amanda Powell, journalist Michael Deacon is sent to get the story. Questions abound about Deacon digs into the pasts of both Billy Blake and Amanda Powell: who is Billy Blake? Could he be Amanda's previously vanished husband? Why did he choose to starve himself in her garage and in full view of a freezer full of food? Why is Amanda so interested in Billy Blake, and why does she pay for his funeral? Along the investigative path, Deacon encounters an unusual cast of characters from Billy's past as well as his own.

== Main characters ==
- Amanda Powell
- Michael Deacon
- Billy Blake

== Television adaptation ==
In 1998 this story was adapted for television by the BBC. The cast featured Clive Owen as Michael Deacon and Joely Richardson as Amanda. The show ran for one season.
