= Minette Walters =

English writer

Minette Walters DL
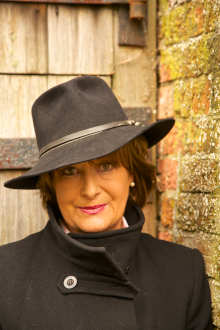
- Born: 26 September 1949 (age 76); Bishop's Stortford, England
- Occupations: Novelist, writer
- Writing career
- Genres: Crime, suspense

Minette Caroline Mary Walters (born 26 September 1949) is an English writer.

== Life and work ==
Walters was born in Bishop's Stortford in 1949 to Samuel Jebb and Colleen Jebb. As her father was a serving army officer, the first 10 years of Walters's life were spent moving between army bases in the north and south of England. Her father died from kidney failure in 1960. While raising Walters and her two brothers, Colleen Jebb painted miniatures from photographs to supplement the family's income. Walters spent a year at the Abbey School in Reading, Berkshire, before winning a Foundation Scholarship at the Godolphin boarding school in Salisbury.

During a gap year between school and Durham University, 1968, Walters volunteered in Israel with The Bridge in Britain, working on a kibbutz and in a delinquent boys' home in Jerusalem. She graduated from Trevelyan College, Durham in 1971 with a BA in French. Minette met her husband Alec Walters while she was at Durham and they married in 1978. They have two sons.

Walters joined IPC Magazines as a sub-editor in 1972 and became an editor of Woman's Weekly Library the following year. She supplemented her salary by writing romantic novelettes, short stories, and serials in her spare time. The romantic novelettes were written in approximately two weeks and published under a pseudonym that remains a secret. Walters turned freelance in 1977 but continued to write for magazines to cover her bills.

Her first full-length novel, The Ice House, was published in 1992. It took two and a half years to write and was rejected by numerous publishing houses until Maria Rejt, Macmillan Publishers, bought it for £1250. Within four months, it had won the Crime Writers' Association John Creasey award for best first novel and had been snapped up by 11 foreign publishers. Walters was the first crime/thriller writer to win three major prizes with her first three books. Walters's second novel, The Sculptress, which was inspired in part by an encounter Walters had as a volunteer prison visitor, won the Mystery Writers of America Edgar Award. Walters's third novel, The Scold's Bridle, then won the CWA Gold Dagger, giving her a unique treble.

Walters's themes include isolation, family dysfunction, rejection, marginalisation, justice and revenge. Her novels are often set against real backgrounds and real events to draw her readers into the 'reality' of what she is writing about. With no series character tying her to particular people, places or times, she moves freely around settings – a sink estate (Acid Row), a Dorset village (Fox Evil), a suburb of London (The Shape of Snakes) – although every setting is 'claustrophobic' to encourage the characters 'to turn on each other'.

Walters describes herself as an exploratory writer who never uses a plot scheme, begins with simple premises, has no idea 'whodunit' until halfway through a story, but who remains excited about each novel because she, along with her reader, wants to know what happens next.

As part of the British project 'Quick Reads', to encourage literacy amongst adults with reading difficulties, Walters wrote a 20,000-word novella called Chickenfeed. In competition with works by other best-selling authors, such as Ruth Rendell, Maeve Binchy and Joanna Trollope, Chickenfeed has won two awards as the best novella in the 'Quick Reads' genre. It has also been translated into several languages.

In September 2007, Walters released her fourteenth book, The Chameleon's Shadow, in the UK.

On 3–7 March 2008, BBC2 aired Murder Most Famous, a five-part TV talent contest series, in which Walters tutors and judges six competing celebrity writers, with the winner having his or her crime fiction novel published by Pan Macmillan on World Book Day 2009. The contestants were Brendan Cole, Sherrie Hewson, Kelvin MacKenzie, Matt Allwright, Angela Griffin and Diarmuid Gavin. The series was won by the actress Sherrie Hewson, whose debut novel The Tannery was published in March 2009.

After a pause of 10 years in which she wrote two novellas, Walters has decided to write historical novels. The first of these novels is The Last Hours, set during the Black Death, followed by a sequel, The Turn of Midnight.

In 2019 Walters was appointed a Deputy Lieutenant of Dorset.

== Bibliography ==
=== Novels and Novellas ===
- The Ice House (1992)
- The Sculptress (1993)
- The Scold's Bridle (1994)
- The Dark Room (1995)
- The Echo (1997)
- The Breaker (1998)
- The Tinder Box (1999) (novella)
- The Shape of Snakes (2000)
- Acid Row (2001)
- Fox Evil (2002)
- Disordered Minds (2003)
- The Devil's Feather (2005)
- Chickenfeed (2006) (novella)
- The Chameleon's Shadow (2007)
- Innocent Victims (2012) (two novellas)
- A Dreadful Murder (2013) (novella)
- The Cellar (2015)
- The Swift and the Harrier (2022)
- The Players (2025)

=== Black Death series ===
- The Last Hours (2017)
- The Turn of Midnight (2018)

In addition to full-length novels, Walters has written feature articles for magazines and the broadsheets, some short stories including "English Autumn, American Fall", and five novellas, including The Tinder Box (1999) and Chickenfeed (2006). The latter was published for World Book Day 2006 as part of the 'Quick Reads' initiative. Minette has written another entry in the Quick Reads series entitled A Dreadful Murder for World Book Day 2013. The novella is based on the 1908 murder of Caroline Luard.

== TV adaptations ==
Walters' first five books were adapted for television by the BBC and her eighth book, Acid Row, is currently under option with Company Pictures.

- The Sculptress – adapted 1996; starred Pauline Quirke, Caroline Goodall and Christopher Fulford.
- The Ice House – adapted 1997; starred Daniel Craig, Frances Barber and Corin Redgrave.
- The Scold's Bridle – adapted 1998; starred Miranda Richardson, Siân Phillips, Virginia McKenna and Trudie Styler.
- The Echo – adapted 1998; starred Clive Owen and Joely Richardson.
- The Dark Room – adapted 1999; starred Dervla Kirwan and James Wilby.

== Awards and nominations ==
- 1992 – The Crime Writers' Association John Creasey Award: The Ice House
- 1994 – The Edgar Allan Poe Award in America and the Macavity Award: The Sculptress
- 1994 – The CWA Gold Dagger Award: The Scold's Bridle
- 1995 – The CWA Gold Dagger Award (shortlist): The Dark Room
- 1995 – The Best Translated Crime Fiction of the Year in Japan, Kono Mystery ga Sugoi! 1996: The Sculptress
- 2000 – The Pelle Rosenkrantz prize Denmark: The Shape of Snakes
- 2001 – The CWA Gold Dagger Award (shortlist): Acid Row
- 2002 – The CWA Gold Dagger Award: Fox Evil
- 2006 – Quick Reads Learners' Favourite award: Chickenfeed
- 2007 – Coventry Inspiration Book Award: Chickenfeed
- 2010 – The Best Foreign Honkaku Mystery of the Decade (shortlist): The Shape of Snakes
