= The Scold's Bridle =

1994 crime novel by Minette Walters

- First edition (UK)
- Author: Minette Walters
- Language: English
- Genre: Crime / Mystery novel
- Publisher: Macmillan Publishers (UK); St Martins Press (US); Allen & Unwin (Aus)
- Publication date: May 6, 1994
- Publication place: United Kingdom
- Media type: Print (hardcover, paperback) & Audio CD
- Pages: 480 pp (paperback)
- ISBN: 0-330-33663-0
- OCLC: 60224582

The Scold's Bridle is a 1994 crime novel by English writer Minette Walters. The book, Walters' third, won a CWA Gold Dagger.

== Synopsis ==
Mathilda Gillespie, an eccentric recluse known for her incredible meanness of nature, is found dead in her bathtub, her wrists slashed and her head locked inside a so-called "scold's bridle", a rusted cage built with tongue clamps which was used as a torture device throughout the Middle Ages. The dead woman's only friend, Dr. Sarah Blakeney, becomes the prime suspect in her murder after police discover that she's been left a great deal of money in the will.

To clear her name, Sarah delves deep into Mathilda's mysterious past, and subsequently unravels an intricate web of greed, abuse and depravity.

== Television adaptation ==
In 1998, The Scold's Bridle was adapted for television by the BBC. It was directed by David Thacker from a screenplay written by Tony Bicât; producer Chris Parr, editor St John O'Rorke, music Junior Campbell.

The cast included:

- Miranda Richardson as Dr. Sarah Blakeney
- Bob Peck as Detective Sergeant Cooper
- Douglas Hodge as Jack Blakeney
- Siân Phillips as Mathilda Gillespie
- Trudie Styler as Joanna Lascelles
- Paul Brooke as Duncan Orloff
- Virginia McKenna as Violet Orloff
- Beth Winslet as Ruth Lascelles
- Rosie Wiggins as Young Mathilda Gillespie
- John Duval as Sir William Cavendish
- Christine Moore as Jenny Spede
- Randal Herley as Dr. Cameron
- Nick Malinowski as Young Detective Constable
- Alan Williams as Bob Spede
- Rosemary Martin as Jane Merryman
- Tenniel Evans as Paul Merryman
- Oona Beeson as Polly Graham
- Miles Anderson as Detective Inspector Harmer
- Alan MacNaughtan as James Gillespie
- Hugh Bonneville as Tim Duggan
