= Ravi Desai =

American businessman

Ravi Desai is an American executive and Harvard graduate accused by various companies, most notably TheStreet.com, of inappropriate and deceitful behaviour in the late 1990s and early 2000s.

Desai is a native of Ithaca, New York.

== Early career ==
In 1996, Desai was the founding Editor in Chief who became the CEO of TheStreet.com, a post he held for 4 months before being fired by Jim Cramer for myriad reasons, including drinking on the job, falsifying business agreements, and blackmail.

In November 1997, he wrote a series of diary entries for Slate magazine discussing, among other topics, his purported position as a strategic analyst at Quantum Corporation.

== Controversies ==
In February 1999, Desai started at Scient, working out of its San Francisco office. While there, he told coworkers that his pregnant wife, Jennifer Call, was dying of cancer, and subsequently died. But Call was not pregnant, nor did she have cancer. That August, the couple filed for divorce, citing irreconcilable differences.

In 2000, Desai pledged $2 million to the University of Washington and another $2 million to the University of Florida, along with $1 million to the University of New Hampshire poetry programs. No university ever received more than a few thousand dollars of the pledge. Also in 2000, a handful of poets, including then U.S. poet laureate Robert Pinsky, joined an advisory board for a national poetry foundation that Desai was starting. All the advisers subsequently resigned after Desai displayed erratic behavior. Desai later blamed his erratic behavior on having acquired a rare degenerative nerve disease. Capping off a busy year, Desai married his second wife, Christine Klingler, but was not yet divorced from his first wife, making him a bigamist.

In January 2001, Formulasys, a privately held tech consulting company, hired Desai as CEO. He was asked to resign five days after getting the top job. The firm claims he had been falsifying contracts with big-name companies like Vodafone.

In March 2002, Slate began publishing diary entries for "Robert Klingler," who purported to be the CEO of BMW's North American division. Slate's readers informed the editorial staff that neither Google's search engine nor Nexis's database turned up any mention of a Robert Klingler in the automobile industry. Slate discovered no one with such a name worked for BMW, and inquiries into Klingler's life led them to name Desai as the actual author and a hoaxster.
