= 1920 in British radio =

This is a list of events from British radio in 1920.

== Events ==
- January – The first informal and spasmodic broadcasts in the United Kingdom are made by the Marconi Company from Chelmsford in Essex. These broadcasts include both speech and music.
- 23 February–6 March – The Marconi Company broadcasts from Chelmsford a series of 30-minute shows repeated twice daily. These include live music performances.
- 15 June – Australian soprano Dame Nellie Melba becomes history's first well-known professional performer to make a radio broadcast when she sings two arias as part of the series of Marconi broadcasts from Chelmsford.
- November – The Marconi broadcasts from Chelmsford cease after it is claimed they interfere with aircraft and ship communications. They resume in 1922 regularly as 2MT.

== Births ==
- 5 February – Frank Muir, comedy writer (died 1998)
- 2 April – Ian Messiter, panel game creator (died 1999)
- 2 May – Joe "Mr Piano" Henderson, Scottish pianist, composer and broadcaster (died 1980)
- 12 June – Peter Jones, comic actor (died 2000)
- 18 June – Ian Carmichael, actor (died 2010)
- 28 June – Irene Thomas, radio quiz show player (died 2001)
- 12 October – Steve Conway, singer (died 1952)
