= 1927 in British radio =

This is a list of events from British radio in 1927.

== Events ==
- 1 January – The British Broadcasting Company is succeeded in monopoly control of the airwaves by the British Broadcasting Corporation, under the terms of a Royal Charter. John Reith becomes the first Director-General.
- 15 January – First live sports broadcast on the BBC: the rugby union international England v Wales, commented on by former player Teddy Wakelam, with BBC executive Cecil Arthur Lewis calling out the location of the ball according to a grid printed in Radio Times.
- 22 January – First ever running commentary on an English Football League match is transmitted by the BBC: Arsenal v. Sheffield United at Highbury, commented on by Wakelam with Lewis.
- 17 March – Premiere of the BBC's first music commission, Holst's The Morning of the Year: a choral ballet in an orchestral version from the Royal Albert Hall in London (Holst shares the programme with Honegger conducting two of his own works).
- 7 July – Christopher Stone presents a record programme on the BBC, becoming the first British disc jockey.
- 13 August – The Proms broadcast concert season opens in London under management of the BBC.
- 21 August – The BBC starts high-power medium-wave transmissions to the English Midlands from station 5GB (Daventry transmitting station) on 610 kHz.
- December – Joshua Powell of Clacton begins the domestic radio relay service which will become Rediffusion.
- Experimental transmissions of shortwave radio from G5SW Chelmsford begin.
- Vernon Bartlett is appointed the BBC's first foreign correspondent.
- Entertainers Elsie and Doris Waters make their first radio appearance on the BBC.

== Births ==
- 26 February – Gerald Priestland, news correspondent (died 1991)
- 25 June – Peter Clayton, jazz disc jockey (died 1991)
- 20 July – Heather Chasen, actress (died 2020)
- 9 November – Ken Dodd, comedian (died 2018)
- 9 December – Benny Green, jazz saxophonist and radio presenter (died 1998)
- 17 December – Robert Robinson, broadcast presenter (died 2011)
