= Big Ticket (game show) =

1998 game show

- Also known as: The National Lottery Big Ticket
- Genre: Game show
- Presented by: Patrick Kielty; Anthea Turner
- Country of origin: United Kingdom
- Original language: English
- No. of series: 1
- No. of episodes: 16

Production
- Production location: Shepperton Studios
- Running time: 45 minutes

Original release
- Network: BBC One
- Release: 28 March – 11 July 1998

Related
- The National Lottery Draws

The National Lottery Big Ticket is a BBC National Lottery game show broadcast on BBC One from 28 March to 11 July 1998. It was a loose adaptation of the German programme Die 100.000 Mark Show, and was hosted by Patrick Kielty and Anthea Turner.

== Background ==
Big Ticket was unique in several ways. In order to be a contestant, members of the public first needed to buy a TV Dreams scratchcard from their local National Lottery retailer, which was launched in February 1998.

If the person revealed three star symbols on their scratchcard, they would win a guaranteed prize of £1,000 and had the opportunity to phone a special hotline number to both claim their prize and apply for participation on the show. The scratchcard winners would be referred to on the show as 'punters' and would watch the gameplay from a special seating area in the studio. Each team of punters was represented by a team of 'champions', made up of one celebrity and one representative from an organisation that has benefited from Lottery funding.

== Format ==
=== Round 1: Catapult Cars ===
Each team is strapped into a giant Scalextric style racing car wired down by a bungee catapult. Before they climb into their cars, they are asked a 50/50 trivia question and must choose slot A or B to represent their answer. After the correct answer is revealed, the bungee catapult is released and the cars are sent hurtling towards a car wash station at the end of the track. A correct answer means the team remains dry but a wrong answer means they receive a soaking and a ten-second penalty for the next round.

=== Round 2: Lift Race ===
The teams are each designated their own lifts – with those who received no penalties in round one being allowed to enter first. At each level, the team is given a 50/50 question on the subject of music, a correct answer will see their lift move up to the next level whilst a wrong answer incurs a 10-second wait before being moved up a level. There are three levels in all and once a team makes it to the top, they must then slide down an escape chute and sprint towards their podium to finish. The last team home is eliminated and the corresponding pair of punters receive £2,000.

=== Rounds 3 & 4 ===
The third and fourth rounds varied from week to week but usually followed along the lines of round three being a general knowledge quiz round and round four being a physical game round. Teams eliminated in round three won £3,000 for their punters and those eliminated in round four won £4,000 for their punters.

=== Final Round: Blow Your Money ===
From the final remaining pair of punters, a wheel on a gigantic safe door is spun and whichever players space the pointer lands on goes forward to play the final round whilst the other punter is given the consolation prize of £5,000 and a bottle of champagne.

In the final round, the winning team of champions are tasked to blow open five of six containers with all money shown being given to the winning punter. One container contained £50,000 and another had zero, with the others containers having amounts between £5,000 and £20,000. By simply avoiding the empty container, the punter can walk away with the £100,000 jackpot.

== TV Home Play ==
Big Ticket also offered a chance for viewers to win at home with a special draw entitled TV Home Play. Entry into the draw was again only possible through playing the TV Dreams scratchcard, and if the player revealed three TV symbols on their scratchcard, they could play along for the chance to win up to £50,000.

Each TV Dreams scratchcard featured a combination of four numbers which only became valid if the scratchcard had three TV symbols on it. All numbers needed to be matched in the exact order drawn in order to win a prize and every winning combination drawn throughout the series remained entitled to claim a prize until the expiration date for prize claims passed.

- The first number was drawn between 1-99 and as each number was drawn, it would be removed from the set and not drawn again. £10 was won for matching the first number.
- The second number was drawn between 1-20 and matching the first two numbers won £50.
- The third number was drawn between 21-50 and matching the first three numbers won £1,000.
- The fourth and final number was drawn between 51-90 and matching all four numbers in the correct order won the £50,000 top prize.

The TV Home Play segment was hosted by "Bernie", a CGI animated host voiced by Kate Robbins.

== Trivia ==
The original premise of the show was that each team was going to consist of ten punters. This was slimmed down to just two punters per team when not enough scratchcard winners came forward.

On the first episode, the third TV Home Play number was drawn incorrectly as 31. It was later redrawn off-screen as 35 and both combinations were honoured for claiming prizes.

Each episode during the series was pre-recorded in the preceding week, and shown in an 'as live' format. The National Lottery draw – which usually took place before the final round of the game – and the TV Home Play segments were broadcast in live inserts to again give the impression to the viewers that the entire episode was live.

The episodes on 27 June and 4 July were broadcast in an earlier timeslot due to the BBC's coverage of the 1998 FIFA World Cup, which resulted in the National Lottery draw not actually happening within these episodes as tickets were still being sold by retailers at the time of broadcast. Consequently, the National Lottery draw was instead shown during half-time of the matches broadcast on those dates.

== Ratings ==
Episode no.	Airdate	Viewers (millions)	BBC One weekly ranking
1	28 March 1998		
2	4 April 1998		
3	11 April 1998		
4	18 April 1998		
5	25 April 1998		
6	2 May 1998		
7	9 May 1998		
8	16 May 1998		
9	23 May 1998		
10	30 May 1998		
11	6 June 1998		
12	13 June 1998		
13	20 June 1998		
14	27 June 1998		
15	4 July 1998	—N/a	—N/a
16	11 July 1998	7.59	17
