= Ken Platt =

British comedian (1921–1998)

Kenneth Platt (born 17 February 1921, Leigh, Lancashire – 2 October 1998, Blackpool, Lancashire) was a British northern comedian.

== Early life ==
Platt decided to become a comedian at the age of 15. He bought a ukulele and performed at local concert parties where he was billed as "George Formby the second", in homage to his idol. He joined the Army in 1942 and was posted to North Africa where he appeared in a concert party, "The Forest Mummers". His flair for comedy performances eventually won him a transfer to CSE, the Combined Services Entertainment unit. The rest of his war service was spent touring North Africa, Corsica, Scandinavia, Italy and Greece. After the war he could be found entertaining the armed forces in Austria and Germany. Subsequently he tried his hand at show business with little success. Disillusioned, he bought a grocery store in Leigh.

== Radio and TV ==
Working in a grocer's shop in Leigh, his home town, he was spotted by Ronnie Taylor, a BBC scriptwriter and producer who asked him to audition in July 1950. As a result, from early the next year, Platt became the resident comedian on the BBC's popular radio show Variety Fanfare, which made him a household name. It was on radio that Platt was in his true element with his immaculate timing and brilliant ad-libbing. With a flat cap and droll line, he was best remembered by the catchphrase with which he began every performance: "Allo, I won't take me coat off - I'm not stoppin'!" Platt was one of the last links with music hall and variety in Great Britain. Some of his other catchphrases were, "Ee, I'm as daft as a brush" and introductions to gags with, "If you can laugh at this, you can plait sawdust", and "If you can laugh at this, you can knit fog".

During 1968-1969, he played Albert, in the television show Wild, Wild Women, of which only episode three is known to exist.

He was a guest comedian on numerous radio variety shows and later topped the bill in pantomimes and summer seasons throughout Great Britain. Throughout the 1970s and 1980s he was a regular guest star on television programmes such as Big Night Out, Spot the Tune and The Liver Birds. He evoked considerable nostalgia by a memorable appearance on BBC's The Good Old Days using much of his material from his days on "steam radio".

A stroke in 1990 affected his speech and forced his retirement. Brian Robinson, his partner and (by then, former) manager, survived him.
