= Jane Tucker =

English singer, songwriter and pianist

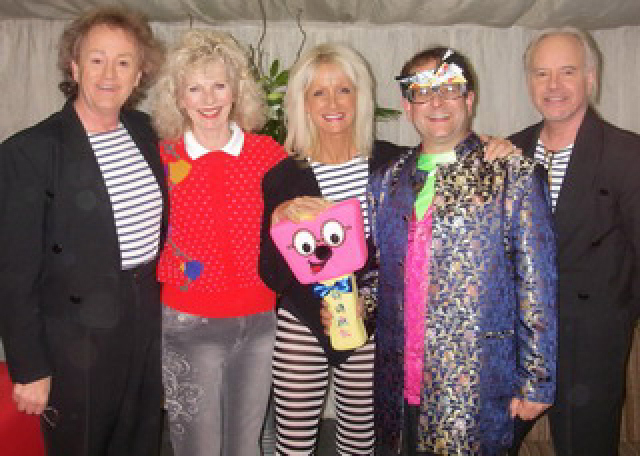
- Freddy Marks (left), Jane Tucker (centre), and Rod Burton (right)
- Born: 20 October 1949 (age 76)
- Education: Guildhall School of Music and Drama
- Occupations: Actor, singer, entertainer
- Spouses: Rod Burton (m. 1976; div. 1979) Freddy Marks (m. 2016; died 2021)
- Father: Rex Tucker

Jane Tucker (born 20 October 1949) is a British actress, singer, songwriter, musician and keyboardist. She was a part of the musical trio Rod, Jane and Freddy who appeared in many TV series, notably Rainbow.

== Career ==
In 1967, Tucker was a hostess on the Associated-Rediffusion game show Exit! It's the Way-Out Show, hosted by Ed Stewart. The show ran for thirteen episodes.

After graduating from Guildhall School of Music and Drama, she worked in repertory theatre, touring, TV, and radio, during which she met and eventually married Rod Burton and, together with him and Matthew Corbett, formed the long-lasting musical trio Rod, Matt and Jane. Corbett was replaced by Roger Walker in 1976 then by Freddy Marks in 1979 to form Rod, Jane and Freddy.

== Personal life ==
She was born into a family with an artistic background. Her grandmother was an opera singer, her mother Jean a pianist, and her father was Rex Tucker, the drama director for the BBC. Jane began to play the piano when she was three, being taught by her mother, as well as studying ballet.

Tucker's first ambition was to follow in her mother's footsteps and become a concert pianist, but as a teenager she decided she would rather be an actress. This led her to study at the Guildhall School of Music & Drama, where she continued her piano and singing whilst embarking on a full-time drama course.

Tucker was married to both of her male co-stars. Burton and Tucker divorced in 1979, following which she went on to marry Marks in 2016; Tucker remained married to Marks until his death in 2021.
