= Rod, Jane and Freddy =

Singing trio

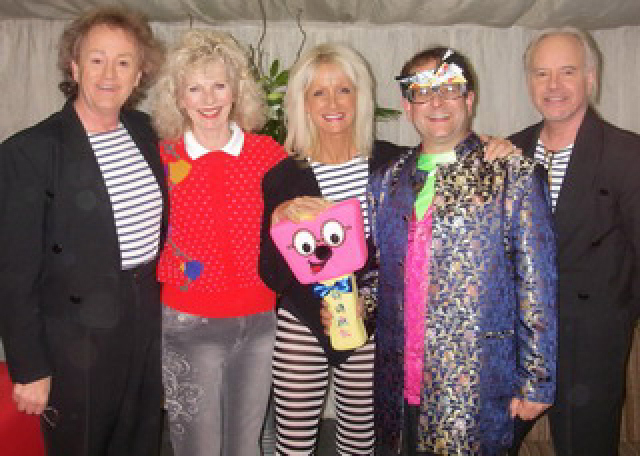
- Freddy Marks (left), Jane Tucker (centre), and Rod Burton (right) with Lizzie Webb and Timmy Mallett

Background information
- Instruments: Rod: Guitar, Drums, banjo Jane: Piano, Synthesizer; Matthew: Guitar; Roger: Guitar; Freddy: Guitar, Bass
- Past members: Rod Burton; Jane Tucker; Freddy Marks; Roger Walker; Matthew Corbett

Rod, Jane and Freddy were a singing trio who appeared in children's programming on the British TV channel ITV in the 1970s, 1980s and early 1990s. They starred both in the long-running series Rainbow and their own 15-minute show. The trio have also made guest appearances in other children's TV shows, including The Sooty Show.

The original trio consisted of Rod Burton, Jane Tucker and Matthew Corbett, when they were known as "Rod, Matt and Jane". Matthew left the trio in 1976 to continue hosting The Sooty Show after his father retired. Matthew was replaced by actor Roger Walker, whereupon the trio became known as "Rod, Jane and Roger". When Walker left in 1980 to continue his career in acting he was replaced by Freddy Marks, leading to the best-remembered incarnation of the trio.

During their three decades working on children's television they wrote over 2,500 songs on various themes using many different music styles. Most were comedic but others had deeper meanings. Overall they have written and produced 10 albums and 24 videos, and have conceived and performed jingles for commercial radio, theme and title music for TV, and songs for pantomimes.

== Rod, Jane and Freddy ==
Rod, Jane and Freddy
- Genre: Children's television series
- Starring: Rod Burton; Jane Tucker; Freddy Marks
- Country of origin: United Kingdom
- Original language: English
- No. of episodes: 120

Production
- Running time: 15 minutes

Original release
- Network: ITV
- Release: 29 September 1981 – 5 March 1991

Due to their popularity on Rainbow, Rod, Jane and Freddy were approached by ITV in 1980 to make their own show, Rod, Jane and Freddy, which aired its first episode on 15 January 1981. Rod, Jane and Freddy appeared in both their own show and Rainbow until 1989, when they left their position as musicians on Rainbow to focus solely on their own series.

Their show often followed a certain format:

- Opening with a big song, giving an idea of the particular show's topic (music and song, pets, moving house, etc.)
- Rod, Jane and Freddy would usually have solo songs
- There was often a sketch, but these were generally rarer than songs
- They would close with a final song
- As the credits rolled, the first or last song would be sung again.

=== Episode list ===
The following is a list of episodes. Fremantle archive episode list use master tape titles where available, if unavailable they use the episode titles as they appeared in TV guides.

Title	Air date	Info
"Pantomime Island" (pilot)	29 September 1981	Rod, Jane and Freddy act out the story of Jack and the beanstalk. (The TV Times has no record of its transmission. It may have been shown, unlisted, within Rainbow.)
"Wobbyland"	6 October 1981	Series of musical stories for children.
"Slumberland"	13 October 1981	Slumberland is the land of dreams where anything can happen. Rod, Jane and Freddy are safely tucked in bed when suddenly they are flying through the night sky.
"Castaways"	20 October 1981	On a desert island there is buried treasure. Who will get to the gold first? - Freddy, the greedy pirate, or Rod and Jane, the two shipwrecked castaways?
"On The Moon"	27 October 1981	Jane and Freddy go to meet the 'Man in the Moon'.
"Under The Sea"	3 November 1981	Songs about life under the sea.
"Clock Land"	10 November 1981	This edition is about a boy and girl who live in a special clock.(now a lost episode - Master and all known copies destroyed.)
"Nursery Rhyme land"	17 November 1981	
"Cowboyland"	24 November 1981	This week features a Wild West show with Buffalo Bill, Annie Oakleigh and the Big Indian Chief.
"Snowland"	1 December 1981	Rolly is a lonely snowman who wishes that Jack Frost would come and build him a friend.
"Circusland"	8 December 1981	
"Toyland"	15 December 1981	The children's toys come alive when the children go to sleep.
"Picturebook Land"	22 December 1981	A girl who doesn't like her nose goes to see a wizard to get it changed.
"The Wobblies (1)"	6 April 1983	The story of Wobblyland and the Wobblies who live there. When the Wobblies' houses melt away in the sun, they must go to the jelly mine to make another jelly house.
"Comics"	13 April 1983	In a comic strip, the story of Punky Pam and Horris Blot finds out that the colours from their page had been taken (or rather borrowed) by Ted the Tealeaf.
"The Chinese Plate"	20 April 1983	The story of the Princess and the gardener who live on the Chinese willow plate design.
"Dolls"	27 April 1983	
"Germs"	4 May 1983	A sung story about three germs, Susie Squidge, Grott and DK - who live in Mrs Jones' bathroom.
"Weather"	11 May 1983	
"Opera Singers"	18 May 1983	
"The Fox"	25 May 1983	The story of a fox (Played by Freddy) who is a daydreamer who goes outside in the day and goes to sleep at night.His friends Badger & Hedgehog (played by Rod & Jane) who know that a hunt will come to their wood if they find him so they do a plan to stop fox going out in the day will all go to plan.
"The Lost Toys"	1 June 1983	One Christmas Eve, Father Christmas was in such a rush that he dropped two presents in the snow and forgot one house altogether. But Pero, the clown doll, and Captain Neutron have to find their home before Christmas Day. They go to a house and meet the Christmas Fairy, who helps them get to the sitting room where the Christmas tree is. Can they get there in time before the big day?
"The Vegetables"	8 June 1983	
"The Tree Gnomes"	15 June 1983	
"The Big Mouth"	22 June 1983	
"The Evil Garden"	29 June 1983	
"Work That Mum Does"	3 October 1984	
"Nursery Rhymes"	10 October 1984	The story of a dame who lives in a shoe. She opens a milk bottle and gets three wishes and one day to spend them.
"Red, Green and Witch Hazel"	17 October 1984	
"Musicland"	24 October 1984	Tom-Tom the drum wants to play with the other instruments in the parade to celebrate the King's birthday, but he is told that he is too loud.
"Garden Fete"	31 October 1984	
"Games"	7 November 1984	
"The Toy Museum"	14 November 1984	
"Garden Gnomes"	21 November 1984	
"Tricky Tommy"	28 November 1984	
"The Grubs"	5 December 1984	
"On Top Of The Table"	12 December 1984	
"The Story Of Tristan"	19 December 1984	This is the original version; it was remade in 1989. This version is filmed without the footlights and theatre effects. Also, Jane's character has no name - she simply said, "I'm me... we don't have names in the land of Nod".
"The Lost Note"	2 January 1985	
"Charlie's Story"	9 January 1985	
"The Bees"	16 January 1985	
"The Wobblies (2)"	23 January 1985	
"The Wobblies-Olympics"	6 January 1988	The Wobblies get ready for the Wobbolympic Games and hope to win a medal.
"The Alley Cats"	13 January 1988	Two friendly cats, Siam and Tom, live in the alley. When Siam gets lost, they help her find her home.
"Top Of The Table"	20 January 1988	Trouble is in store for Sunny, the character on the butterpack wrapping, and Stodgy the breadboy, when Mrs. Jones, the lady of the house goes on a diet.
"The Dragon in the Dungeon"	27 January 1988	The tale of Princess Angelica, Peterkin the librarian, and the brave but boring knight, Sir Brian de Bolfrey. One of them will defeat the dragon to win the hand of the beautiful princess, but who will it be?
"The Ship In The Bottle"	3 February 1988	The story of a fishing trip which suddenly changes course when Redbeard the pirate appears.
"The Man With No Shadow"	10 February 1988	What happens to the man with no shadow? How can he discover a way to get it back?
"The Weathervane"	17 February 1988	The story of how Mr and Mrs Corkinbottle lose their home in the weathervane, and how Hieronamous the gnome comes to the rescue.
"The Adventures of Mary Mary"	24 February 1988	Mary Mary from the nursery rhyme “Mary Had a Little Lamb” meets Zap and Zoom the space heroes and they have adventures together.
"The Scarecrow"	2 March 1988	The story of the scarecrow who asks Mr Sun and Mr Cloud to give him a change of weather.
"Small World"	9 March 1988	The story of how Cob the Cobbler and Thimble the Tailor help a fairy go to the Springtime Revels.
"The Magic Socks"	16 March 1988	The magical musical story of the wizards socks.
"The Riddle of the Clock"	23 March 1988	Young Alice pays a visit to Old Father Time and arranges some extra time for the Mad Hatter and March Hare to prepare tea for the Queen of Hearts.
"The Funny Shape"	30 March 1988	It's strange and a bit frightening when you can't find anything or anyone that looks like you. But the Square and Triangle come to the rescue.
"Mirrors/Dressing Up"	3 January 1989	The setting is a theatre where our three musicians are into dress-up, helped by their dressing room mirrors. Having braved the stormy seas as sailors, and with a few pieces of clothing and some grease paint, Rod becomes a clown and Jane a fish, a princess, a great explorer and a ballet dancer.
"The Attic/Looking Back"	10 January 1989	Rod, Jane and Freddy sort through there things and remember the past.
"Domestic Animals"	17 January 1989	Rod, Freddy and Jane sing about all the different kinds of pets they have met.
"The Farmyard"	24 January 1989	All about animals you may find on a trip to a farm.
"Wild Animals"	31 January 1989	Rod, Jane and Freddy go exploring in the jungle.
"Counting"	7 February 1989	Rod, Jane and Freddy sing about counting and numbers.
"Nursery Rhymes (1)"	14 February 1989	Rod, Jane and Freddy sing various nursery rhymes in modern and traditional styles.
"Day Out/The Seaside"	21 February 1989	Rod, Jane and Freddy go on an adventure.
"Vegetables"	28 February 1989	Featuring songs about vegetables.
"Colours/Shapes"	7 March 1989	Featuring songs about balloons and colours.
"London Town"	14 March 1989	Take a trip with Rod, Jane and Freddy to old London town.
"Illusions"	21 March 1989	Can you believe your eyes?
"Tramps / Riff Raff"	28 March 1989	Rod, Jane and Freddy dress up as tramps.
"Putting On A Show"	4 April 1989	Rod Jane and Freddy show us some of the problems which have to be faced before an audience can be entertained. Jane performs ballet and tap, Freddy uses a typewriter and Rod pretends to play a trumpet.
"Hats"	11 April 1989	Featuring songs about hats.
"Daytime/Night-time"	18 April 1989	Rod, Jane and Freddy sing songs about both day and night.
"Books and Words"	25 April 1989	Let Rod, Jane and Freddy show you what kinds of adventure you can have when you read.
"Entertainment"	2 May 1989	A musical themed episode.
"Nursery Rhymes (2)"	5 September 1989	Rod, Jane and Freddy sing various nursery rhymes in modern and traditional styles.
"The Street"	12 September 1989	This episode is all about life on the street.
"Party/Fancy Dress"	19 September 1989	Rod Jane and Freddy get dressed up for a party.
"Emotions (1)"	26 September 1989	Rod, Jane and Freddy explore all different kinds of emotions.
"Fast and Slow"	3 October 1989	Featuring songs about fast and slow people and animals.
"Moving - Decorating"	10 October 1989	Rod Jane and Freddy have muchfun with boxes
"Sounds"	17 October 1989	Featuring songs about a variety of sounds.
"Emotions (2)"	24 October 1989	Rod, Jane and Freddy explore all different kinds of emotions.
"The Girl With The Long Nose"	31 October 1989	The story of a girl who doesn't like her nose goes to see a wizard to get it changed but he can only a cast a spell if she meets someone with an even longer nose.
"Colours (1)"	7 November 1989	Featuring songs about colours and painting.
"Food - Sweets"	14 November 1989	Featuring songs about sweets and fruits.
Food - Normal	21 November 1989	Featuring songs about different kinds of food
"Paper (1)"	28 November 1989	Featuring songs about paper.
"Suitcases (1)"	5 December 1989	Rod, Jane and Freddy make a train and car out of suitcases.
"Tristan"	12 December 1989	Nod is the keeper of all the dreams in the land and is writing a dream for a boy called Tristan. Nod's assistant Dreamboy meets Tristan and takes him to many different places in his dream, but he ends up not liking any of them. Will Nod manage to finish writing his dream?
"A Day in the Country"	19 December 1989	Rod, Jane and Freddy have a musical day in the country. As well as having an enjoyable picnic, there are some strange and exciting animals, birds and insects to meet.
"Snow and Ice"	9 January 1990	A winter themed episode.
"Dressing Up"	16 January 1990	Rod, Jane and Freddy are dressing up and pretend to be in the theatre.
"Houses and Homes"	23 January 1990	Featuring songs about the different kind of homes where people and animals live.
"Suitcases (2)"	30 January 1990	Rod, Jane and Freddy make a boat and a desert island out of suitcases using a green umbrella for a palm tree.
"The Garden"	6 February 1990	Featuring songs about the garden, gnomes and different seasons.
"Games"	13 February 1990	Featuring songs all about games.
"Cowboys"	20 February 1990	This week features a Wild West Show with Buffalo Bill, Annie Oakleigh and the Big Indian Chief.
"Music and Song"	27 February 1990	Rod, Jane and Freddy perform a music-themed episode.
"The Chinese Plate"	6 March 1990	The sung story of the Princess and the gardener who live on the Chinese willow plate.
"Pets"	4 September 1990	Rod, Freddy and Jane sing about all the different kinds of pets they have met.
"Flowers"	11 September 1990	Featuring songs about flowers and the garden.
"Paper (2)"	18 September 1990	Featuring songs about paper.
"Time"	25 September 1990	Featuring songs about the time and clocks.
"Faces"	2 October 1990	This episode is all about different faces.
"Feelings"	9 October 1990	This episode is all about Feelings and thinking about how others feel.
"Colours (2)"	16 October 1990	This episode is all about different colours.
"Mechanical"	23 October 1990	This episode is all about with machines.
"Moon and Stars"	30 October 1990	Featuring songs about nighttime.
"Improvisation"	6 November 1990	The trio make many different things such as a music machine from bottles and saucepans.
"Dots and Dashes"	13 November 1990	Featuring songs about dots, dashes and dice.
"Costume"	20 November 1990	Rod, Jane and Freddy dress up in different costumes.
"Daytime"	27 November 1990	This episode is all about getting up and parts of the day.
"Boxes"	4 December 1990	Rod, Jane and Freddy make various things from boxes.
"Toys"	11 December 1990	A Christmas themed episode.
"Children's Favourites"	18 December 1990	Classic nursery rhymes given new tunes.
"Entertainers"	8 January 1991	The trio are in the theatre today.
"Light"	15 January 1991	Featuring songs about lights and the stage.
"Friends"	22 January 1991	Rod, Jane and Freddy explore all different kinds of emotions.
"Funny Noises"	29 January 1991	This episode is all about different kinds of noises.
"Musical Instruments"	5 February 1991	Featuring songs using different instruments.
Body Movement	12 February 1991	Featuring songs about movement.
"Tricks of the Trade"	19 February 1991	Featuring songs about tricks and magic.
"Country Matters"	26 February 1991	Featuring songs about the farm.
"Rhythm"	5 March 1991	This episode is all about different kinds of rhythms and sounds.

Many episodes from 1981 to 1982 no longer exist due to the then British TV policy of wiping.

== Touring ==
Rod, Jane and Freddy toured the UK until 1996; their stage show followed the same format and the 15-minute ITV show, filled with songs, dancing, mime and comedy. In 1996 they won a Gold Badge Award from The British Academy of Composers and Songwriters.

== Videos ==
The trio released a number of videos in the late 80s and early 90s. These include:

VHS title	Release date	Info
Rod, Jane and Freddy	5 October 1987	Features 5 musical stories from the early 80s. -Episode list Comics The Fox The Chinese Plate The Wobblies (1) The Lost toys
Rod, Jane and Freddy's Stories and Rhymes (TV8087)	5 February 1990	Features 5 musical stories from their 1988 series. -Episode list The Adventures of Mary Mary The Dragon in the Dungeon The Riddle of the Clock Magic Socks Small World
In A Winter Wonderland	1991	The trio perform a special Christmas themed show.
Live on Stage	1992	The trio perform a live stage show from their 1992 stage tour.
Say No! To Strangers	1992	Highlights the important message of saying no to strangers, through song and roleplay.

== Present-day ==
Following the end of the Rod, Jane and Freddy Show, the trio no longer regularly appeared on television, instead appearing in British children's theatre and pantomime. The trio also appeared in Peter Kay's video for his 2007 Comic Relief release of I'm Gonna Be (500 Miles).

In June 2008 Rod, Jane and Freddy appeared on the show 50 Ways to Leave Your TV Lover on Sky and talked about newspaper claims that they were involved in a love triangle. They explained that Rod and Jane had been married then divorced. Jane partnered with Freddy some time after he had joined the trio, a relationship that led to their eventual marriage in May 2016.

Jane Tucker appeared on The Justin Lee Collins Show on ITV2 on 19 March 2009. She was in the part of the show called 'A Blast From The Past' and also appeared at the end of the show dancing with Justin.

Freddy Marks died on 27 May 2021.
