= Generosity (disambiguation) =

Generosity is the virtue of being liberal in giving.

Generosity may also refer to:

- Generosity: An Enhancement, a 2009 novel by American author Richard Powers
- "Generosity", a 2019 sculpture by Mexican artist Dulce Pinzon
- "Generosity", a 1988 television episode from Rainbow, a British children's television series
- "Generosity", a 1997 television episode from Adventures from the Book of Virtues, an American animated children's television series
- "Generosity", a 2011 television episode from The Glee Project, an American reality television series
- Generosity", a 2009 song from the album (a)spera by American singer-songwriter Mirah
- "Generosity", a 2013 song from My Little Pony: Friendship Is Magic discography
- Generosity, an American clean water technology company founded in 2022 by Justin Bieber
