= Freddy Marks =

British actor and musician (1949–2021)

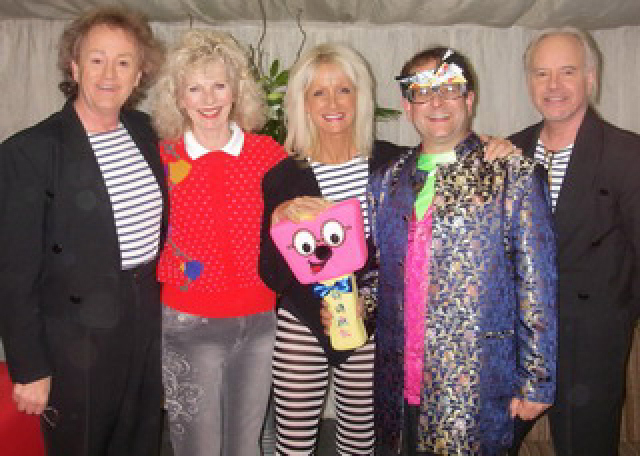
- Marks (left) alongside Lizzie Webb, Jane Tucker, Timmy Mallett and Rod Burton on Red Nose Day 2007
- Born: Frederick Marks; 10 September 1949; Smethwick, Worcestershire, England
- Died: 20 May 2021 (aged 71); Esher, Surrey, England
- Education: Royal Central School of Speech and Drama
- Occupations: Actor; singer; entertainer
- Spouse: Jane Tucker (m. 2016)
- Relatives: Rex Tucker (father-in-law)

Frederick Marks (10 September 1949 – 20 May 2021) was an English actor, singer and entertainer. He was best known for being part of the musical trio Rod, Jane and Freddy which appeared in children's programming in the 1980s and 1990s.

== Early life ==
Marks was born in Smethwick, Worcestershire in 1949 to Freda (née Lawson) and William Marks. He lived in Birkenhead, Cheshire, in his youth, and was interested in music and the theatre from an early age and played in various bands and was involved with youth amateur dramatics. He trained at the Central School of Speech and Drama in London from 1968 to 1971.

== Career ==
In his early career, Marks appeared on stage in productions such as The Lion in Winter and as part of Dundee Repertory Theatre. He appeared in TV series such as Z-Cars (1973–77), The Sweeney (1976), and Churchill's People (1975) before returning to the stage in 1977 to portray Brad Majors in The Rocky Horror Show at Chelsea's King's Road Theatre before its return to the West End.

In 1980, Marks was hired to join the cast of Rainbow after Roger Walker left the show. Marks joined the two existing musicians, Rod Burton and Jane Tucker, to form Rod, Jane and Freddy.

Towards the end of 1980, Rod, Jane and Freddy were approached by ITV to do their own show. Rod, Jane and Freddy aired its first episode in January 1981, and in total seven series were broadcast. The trio continued to appear in Rainbow until 1989, and the following year Thames Television lost the ITV franchise. Rod, Jane and Freddy finished the following year.

Marks also worked as a scriptwriter for The Sooty Show, Playdays, and Wizadora.

== Personal life and death ==
Marks began a relationship with co-star Jane Tucker in 1985; they married in May 2016.

During Bill Oddie's 2002 appearance on This Is Your Life, it was revealed that Marks had saved Oddie from drowning in the Seychelles. Oddie repeated the story on his 2011 appearance on Would I Lie to You?.

In January 2021, Marks was diagnosed with cancer. He was admitted to a hospice in Esher, Surrey in May 2021, and died there on 20 May; his death was announced the following week.
