= Ronnie Le Drew =

Canadian-British puppeteer (1947–2026)

- Born: 23 October 1947; Toronto, Ontario, Canada
- Died: 27 July 2026 (aged 78); England
- Citizenship: Canada; United Kingdom
- Occupations: Puppeteer; actor

Ronnie Le Drew (23 October 1947 – 27 July 2026) was a Canadian-born British puppeteer who was born in Toronto, Canada. He is best known for operating "Zippy" from the ITV children's television series Rainbow. Le Drew died on 27 July 2026, aged 78.

== Bibliography ==
- Zippy and Me: My Life Inside Britain’s Most Infamous Puppet, Ronnie Le Drew, Nuala Calvi, Duncan Barrett, Unbound, 2019, 416 pages, ISBN 9781783526987
