= David Cook (writer) =

British actor and writer (1940–2015)

- Born: David Kenneth Cook; 21 September 1940; Preston, Lancashire, England, United Kingdom
- Died: 16 September 2015 (aged 74)
- Education: Royal Academy of Dramatic Art
- Occupations: Author, screenwriter, actor

David Kenneth Cook (21 September 1940 – 16 September 2015) was a British author, screenwriter and actor. He is best known for the screen adaptation of his 1978 novel Walter, and was the first presenter of the UK TV programme Rainbow. He was born in Preston, Lancashire. He studied at the Royal Academy of Dramatic Art, London, from 1959 to 1961. His first role was in the 1962 film adaptation of A Kind of Loving. Thereafter, he worked on both stage and television. He began to write novels and also for television in the early 1970s.

He presented the first and second series of Rainbow, the first episode of which aired in October 1972. He left the show to concentrate on his writing before the third series in 1973, and was replaced as presenter by Geoffrey Hayes.

Cook went on to write Walter, a novel about a young man with learning disabilities, that won the Hawthornden Prize in 1978. In 1982, the movie Walter was broadcast on Channel 4's opening night. It starred Ian McKellen and was directed by Stephen Frears. Cook's follow-up novel, Winter Doves, was also filmed with McKellen, and a 2009 radio play, Walter Now, saw Walter become a pensioner. It also focused on reproductive rights for people with learning disabilities.

Cook continued to act, and provided several of the screenplays for the BBC TV series Hetty Wainthropp Investigates, a series based on his 1986 novel Missing Persons.

In 1989, Cook was on the controversial judging panel of the (then) Whitbread Book Award, now known as the Costa Book Awards.

He died on 16 September 2015, aged 74. He was survived by his long-term partner, novelist and playwright John Bowen.
