= Rod Burton =

British singer, songwriter, and musician (born 1948)

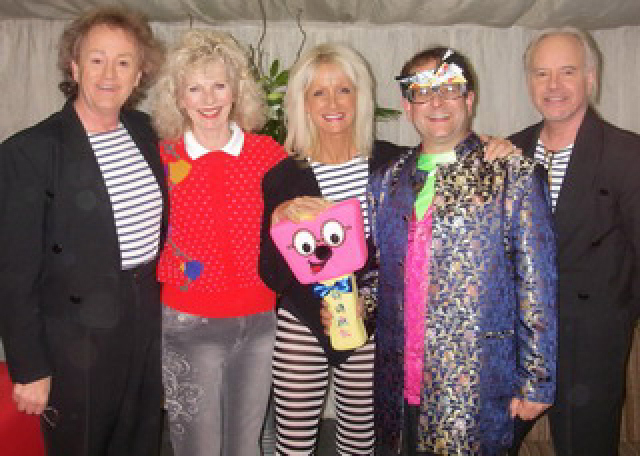
- Freddy Marks (left), Jane Tucker (centre), and Rod Burton (right)
- Born: 10 September 1948 (age 76)
- Occupation(s): Actor, singer, entertainer
- Spouse: Jane Tucker (m. 1976; div. 1979)

Rod Burton (born 10 September 1948) is a British singer, songwriter, actor, musician and entertainer. He is best known for being part of the trio Rod, Jane and Freddy along with their appearances on the children's TV series Rainbow and their own series Rod, Jane and Freddy between 1980 and 1991.

== Career ==
He spent several years busking in the south of France and playing in pubs and bars until an audition with his then wife Jane Tucker got him a job on children's TV show Rainbow.

Towards the end of 1980, the trio were approached by ITV to do their own show. Plans went through, and The Rod, Jane and Freddy Show aired its first episode on 15 January 1981. Rod, Jane and Freddy appeared in both their own show and Rainbow until 1989, when they left Rainbow to focus solely on The Rod, Jane and Freddy Show.

In 1990, Burton toured with Jane and Freddy in their stage shows all across the country until 1996. In 1996, he won a Gold Badge Award from the British Academy of Songwriters, Composers and Authors.

== Personal life ==
Burton studied graphic design at the London College of Printing and started his career illustrating books. He left this field to pursue music. Burton married co-star Jane Tucker in 1976. In 1979, after three years of marriage, Burton divorced Tucker.
