= The Telegoons =

British TV comedy series (1963–1964)

- Opening title card
- Created by: Grosvenor Films
- Voices of: Peter Sellers; Harry Secombe; Spike Milligan
- Music by: Edward White
- Country of origin: United Kingdom
- No. of episodes: 26

Production
- Producer: Tony Young
- Running time: 15 minutes per episode

Original release
- Network: BBC
- Release: 5 October 1963 – 1 August 1964

The Telegoons is a comedy puppet show, adapted from the 1950's BBC radio comedy show The Goon Show, produced by Tony Young for BBC television and first shown during 1963 and 1964. Two series of thirteen episodes were made. The series was briefly repeated immediately after its original run, and all episodes are known to have survived. Harry Secombe, Peter Sellers and Spike Milligan reprised their original voice roles from the radio series and appeared in promotional photos with some of the puppets from the series. Among the puppeteers were Ann Field, John Dudley, and Violet Phelan. The original radio scripts were adapted by Maurice Wiltshire, who had previously co-written a number of radio episodes with Larry Stephens.

The only official broadcasts of any Telegoons material since the 1960s were a short excerpt, claimed to have been newly printed from the original negative, shown on the 1980s BBC archive series Windmill, and a brief excerpt during the quiz programme Telly Addicts. However DVD compilations of all episodes (from unknown sources) are available on eBay and other outlets.

A lengthy excerpt from a cast recording for the episode "The Lost Colony" is included on The Goon Show Compendium Volume 11 CD box set. The recording, made at Olympic Studios, is taken from a tape kept by the studio's former owner.

== Comic book adaptation ==
A Telegoons comic strip appeared in TV Comic, drawn by Bill Titcombe and was published in 1963-1964.

== Episodes ==
1st Series (1963):

1. The Ascent of Mount Everest - 5 October Based on part of The Goon Show series 3 episode 24

2. The Lost Colony - 12 October Based on The Sale of Manhattan, series 6 episode 11

3. The Fear of Wages - 19 October Based on series 6 episode 25

4. Napoleon's Piano - 26 October Based on series 6 episode 4

5. The Last Tram - 2 November Based on series 5 episode 9

6. The China Story - 16 November Based on China Story, series 5 episode 17

7. The Canal - 23 November Based on series 5 episode 6

8. The Choking Horror - scheduled for 30 November; postponed due to repeat of Doctor Who: An Unearthly Child, Episode 1; broadcast 28 December Based on series 6 episode 22

9. The Hastings Flyer - 7 December Based on The Pevensey Bay Disaster, series 6 episode 10, remade as The Hastings Flyer - Robbed, series 6 episode 15

10. The Mystery of the Marie (sic) Celeste-Solved - 14 December Based on The Mystery of the Marie (sic) Celeste (Solved) series 5 episode 8

11. The International Christmas Pudding - 21 December Based on series 6 episode 9

2nd Series (1964):

12. Scradje - 28 March Based on series 6 episode 26

13. The Booted Gorilla - 4 April Based on series 5 episode 10

14. The Underwater Mountain - 11 April Based on The Greatest Mountain in the World series 4 episode 23, remade as Vintage Goons episode 2

15. The Dreaded Batter Pudding Hurler of Bexhill-on-Sea - 18 April Based on series 5 episode 3

16. Tales of Old Dartmoor - 25 April Based on series 6 episode 21

17. Lurgi Strikes Britain - 2 May Based on series 5 episode 7

18. Captain Seagoon R.N. - 9 May Based on Personal Narrative, series 7 episode 8

19. The First Albert Memorial to the Moon - 16 May Based on series 4 episode 7, remade as The Albert Memorial, Vintage Goons episode 14

20. The Whistling Spy Enigma - 23 May Based on series 5 episode 1

21. Tales of Montmartre - 30 May Based on series 6 episode 21

22. The Africa Ship Canal - 6 June Based on series 7 episode 22

23. The Affair of the Lone Banana - 13 June Based on series 5 episode 5

24. The Terrible Revenge of Fred Fu-Manchu - scheduled for 20 June; postponed due to overrunning coverage of cricket from Lord's; broadcast 1 August Based on Series 6 episode 12

25. The Nadger Plague - 27 June Based on series 7 episode 3

26. The Siege of Fort Knight, or, The Underwater Gas-Stove - 18 July Based on series 4 episode 30, remade as Vintage Goons episode 13
