= Violet Philpott =

English puppeteer and author (1922-2012)

Violet Philpot
- Born: Violet Phelan Yeomans; 28 April 1922; Kentish Town, London
- Died: 14 December 2012 (aged 90)
- Occupations: Pupereer, author
- Known for: Zippy in Rainbow

Violet Phelan Philpott (née Yeomans; 28 April 1922 – 14 December 2012) was an English puppeteer and author, who worked in theatre and television. She was involved in the production of The Telegoons by making marionette figures and created the character Zippy for the children's television show Rainbow in 1972 but left production after one series because of a back injury. She toured the United Kingdom giving performances until she stopped in 2009 after being afflicted with dementia.

== Biography ==
=== Early life and career ===
Philpott was born Violet Yeomans in Kentish Town in north London on 28 April 1922. She was the only child of Lilian and Robert Yeomans, a pub entertainer. Philpott's parents divorced when she was seven years old and lived with her father for two years before going to live with her mother. She adopted her mother's maiden name Phelan. With an interest in photography, Philpott went to Saint Martin's School of Art where she was taught puppet making by A. R. Philpott. She later moved in with him and the two married in 1962. When the BBC was searching for a television outlet to broadcast its adaption of the radio show The Goon Show, it launched The Telegoons, and Philpott's involvement in its production was creating many of the marionette figures seen in the show, working for a total of 15 episodes, and voiced the characters of Major Bloodnok and Bluebottle.

Philpott created puppets from junk material to entertain children at St Paul's Church, Covent Garden in their annual Punch and Judy festival. In the Devon village of Dittisham, she worked in a children's theatre workshop production, and worked alongside Emma Thompson and Sophie Thompson while the pair were children. Philpott was the founder of the Charivari Puppets, and later Cap and Bells Puppet theatre in 1971. Several of her live shows featured the adventures of a baby called Bandicoot, who was surrounded by a variety of animal friends of which Philpott lent her voice to. Philpott adapted other stories such as The Ugly Duckling at the Little Angel Theatre where she was a regular visiting artist and performed as Boo the Clown. She found her greatest success with the creation of Zippy on the television show Rainbow in 1972 but her involvement with the show ended after one season after she sustained a back injury by adopting a pose each time the character appeared through a window.

=== Later career and death ===
In 1975, Philpott and Mary Jean McNeil produced a children's guide called The KnowHow Book of Puppets that contains illustrations which aims to educate children on how to produce puppet shows. She published a book entitled Bandicoot and His Friends the following year. Philpott taught drama at Rose Bruford College, served as a council member on the Educational Puppetry Association and became part of The Puppet Centre Trust in 1978. She ran workshops on a regular basis also gave performances for disabled and disadvantaged people. Philpott continued to tour until 2009 after becoming afflicted with dementia and died in her sleep on 14 December 2012 at Hadley Lawns nursing home at the age of 90. She had no children.
