= Walter (1982 film) =

British drama television film

- Edited release of both films under the name Loving Walter
- Genre: Drama
- Based on: Walter by David Cook
- Story by: David Cook
- Directed by: Stephen Frears
- Starring: Ian McKellen; Barbara Jefford; Tony Melody; David Ryall; Keith Allen; Paula Tilbrook; Jim Broadbent
- Theme music composer: George Fenton
- Country of origin: United Kingdom
- Original language: English

Production
- Executive producer: Richard Creasey
- Producers: Patrick Cassavetti; Richard Creasey; Nigel Evans
- Cinematography: Chris Menges
- Editor: Mick Audsley
- Running time: 70 min.
- Production companies: Central Independent Television; Randel Evans Productions

Original release
- Network: Channel 4
- Release: 2 November 1982

Walter is a British television drama directed by Stephen Frears and starring Ian McKellen, Barbara Jefford, Tony Melody, David Ryall, Keith Allen, Paula Tilbrook, and Jim Broadbent. It was first broadcast on the launch night of Channel 4 on 2 November 1982. Based on a 1978 novel of the same name by David Cook, it was the first ever Film on Four.

== Plot ==
The film was directed by Stephen Frears and stars Ian McKellen as Walter, a man with learning difficulties. The story focuses initially on his youth in which his parents attempt, with little success, to have him adapt into the conditions of a "normal" life. Walter's father dies, followed soon after by his mother. The social services bureaucracy then place him in a psychiatric institution. Walter is molested by another patient, witnesses the murder of a patient by another patient having a breakdown and remains in the institution for the rest of the film.

== Cast ==
- Ian McKellen as Walter
- Barbara Jefford as Sarah, Walter's mother
- Arthur Whybrow as Walter's father
- Tony Melody as Mr Hingley
- David Ryall as Mr Richards
- Linda Polan as Miss Rushden
- Keith Allen as Mike (Stockroom)
- Lesley Claire O'Neill as Jean (Stockroom)
- Paula Tilbrook as Mrs. Ashby
- Marjorie Yeats as Social Worker
- Jim Broadbent as Joseph (Orderly)
- Kenny Ireland as Angus (Orderly)
- Donald McKillop as Mr Lipman
- Nabil Shaban as Ben Gunn
- Bob Flag as Harold
- Lol Coxhill as Hospital Patient
- Robert Walker as Staff Nurse
- John Surman as Male Nurse
- Trevor Laird as Errol (Nurse)
- Robin Hooper as Orderly (Washroom)
- Stephen Petcher as Dave (Stockroom)
- Garry Cooper as Roger (Stockroom)
- Frankie Connolly as Young Walter

== Reception ==
=== Critical response ===
The Evening Standard reported at the time:

Channel 4 is taking the extraordinary step of launching itself with one of the most shocking films about mental illness ever shown on British TV. Walter, which occupies the key slot in next Tuesday's opening night schedule, features scenes of homosexual molestation in a mental hospital, patients covered in excrement, and a suicide in a barber's shop.

As part of his review of Channel 4's launch night, Chris Dunkley of the Financial Times wrote that:

The temptation is to go overboard in praise of Walter, first of the channel's 'Film On Four' productions, because its cause was so worthy and the central performance by Ian McKellen so overpoweringly moving.

=== Accolades ===
The film was nominated for two BAFTA TV awards for Best Make Up and Best Single Drama in 1983. McKellen won The Royal Television Society Performer of the Year for his performance.

== Sequels ==
A sequel, directed by Frears and starring McKellen, entitled Walter and June and set some 19 years later, was aired in May 1983. Walter and June was adapted from David Cook's novel Winter Doves. Walter falls in love with an attractive fellow-patient (played by Sarah Miles) and at her urging the two escape and attempt a life together in the outside world. At first matters go well, but ultimately Walter comes to the sad realisation that he cannot relate to others not like him and he returns alone to the sheltered refuge of the asylum.

The two films are sometimes packaged together in an edited form under the title Loving Walter (when played together, the original two films run to 2 hours 14 minutes, while Loving Walter is 2 hours 5 minutes long).

McKellen reprised the role in BBC Radio 4's Saturday Play Walter Now, broadcast on 12 January 2009, in which his character is revisited 26 years later as an old man, when the institution in which he used to live is closed and he is moved into a smaller, group home. Among the issues explored are the subjects of reproductive rights for people who have learning difficulties, and the right to self-determination in areas such as choosing one's own home and housemates.
