= Geoffrey Hayes =

English television presenter and actor (1942–2018)

- Geoffrey Hayes on the Rainbow studio set
- Born: Charles Geoffrey Hayes; 13 March 1942; Stockport, Cheshire, England
- Died: 30 September 2018 (aged 76)
- Occupations: Television presenter; actor
- Years active: 1967−2018
- Spouse: Sarah Williams (m. 1987)
- Children: 1

Charles Geoffrey Hayes (13 March 1942 – 30 September 2018) was an English television presenter and actor. He presented Thames Television's children's show Rainbow from 1973 to 1992.

== Early life and education ==
Hayes was born on 13 March 1942 in Stockport, Cheshire. His mother was Mary (née Higgins) and his father was Sam Hayes. At the age of 15 he left school and took a succession of temporary jobs, including working in a cotton mill and in a British Rail ticket office. He joined the Oldham Repertory, working as a scene shifter, and this opened up acting opportunities. He began to train as an actor at drama school in Manchester, and gained repertory theatre acting experience in Liverpool, Dundee and Manchester.

== Career ==
Hayes' early appearances on television came in the late 1960s, when he took a number of small roles in police dramas, appearing as a police constable in Detective (1968); as a lorry driver in Dixon of Dock Green (1968); and in three different roles in Softly, Softly: Task Force (1969–1975). He also appeared as a taxi driver in the soap opera Harriet's Back in Town (1973). His breakthrough role came when he took the role of Detective Constable Scatliff in Z-Cars (1971–1974).

Hayes' most prominent role was the presenter of Thames Television's children's show Rainbow from 1973 to 1992, replacing original host David Cook. Hayes fronted the programme accompanied by Bungle, a costumed bear, and two hand puppets, Zippy and George. Hayes also had writing credits for Rainbow and The Great Pony Raid in 1967.

Hayes struggled to find work after Rainbow was cancelled by ITV when the production company, Thames Television, lost its franchise in 1991. He took a job stacking shelves for his local Sainsbury's grocery for four months as he had not yet found an acting job. He spent time as a taxicab driver and then retired some time later. He said that he would like to have done serious acting work after the show ended, but directors could not disassociate him from his role in Rainbow. Hayes starred in a humorous television advert for Virgin Money savings accounts, making fun of his fall from the top.

Hayes appeared in the video for "I'd Like to Teach the World to Sing" by Oasis tribute band, No Way Sis. He replicated the role of a taxi driver, just as Patrick Macnee had done in the Oasis video for "Don't Look Back in Anger". Hayes also appeared in the all-star line up for the video of Tony Christie with Peter Kay's single "Is This the Way to Amarillo?" In 2002, he was a guest panellist on an episode of Never Mind the Buzzcocks.

Hayes was part of the Walkers Crisps campaign for Monster Munch in 2008. The stated objective of the campaign was to find the missing monster puppets from the original 1980s television advertisements for the snack. In the film clip, he mentions that he has heard from Bungle recently. In September 2015, he was a guest on BBC One's Pointless Celebrities alongside the former Tiswas star Sally James. The pair got through to the final, but did not get a Pointless answer.

== Personal life, illness and death ==
Hayes married Sarah Williams in 1987. The couple had a son.

Hayes was a fan of the Scottish football team Dundee United, having lived in the city in the 1960s. Hayes said that he asked the producers of Rainbow to make the Zippy puppet tangerine in colour, to match Dundee United's colours rather than the blue of local rivals Dundee.

Hayes had homes in London and Spain.

Hayes died of pneumonia in hospital on 30 September 2018, aged 76.
