= Rainbow (TV series) =

British children's television series (1972–1997)

- Genre: Educational; Comedy
- Created by: Pamela Lonsdale
- Presented by: David Cook; Geoffrey Hayes
- Starring: John Leeson; Stanley Bates; Malcolm Lord; Richard Robinson; Paul Cullinan; Peter Hawkins; Roy Skelton; Violet Philpott; Ronnie Le Drew; Dawn Bowden; Telltale; Rod Burton; Jane Tucker; Matthew Corbett; Roger Walker; Freddy Marks
- Opening theme: "Rainbow" by Telltale
- Ending theme: Various (normally the instrumental of the Rainbow theme tune)
- Country of origin: United Kingdom
- Original language: English
- No. of series: 25
- No. of episodes: 1,002 (list of episodes)

Production
- Production location: Teddington Studios
- Running time: 15 minutes (specials 10 minutes longer)
- Production companies: Thames Television (1972–1992); Tetra Films for HTV (1994–1997)

Original release
- Network: ITV
- Release: 16 October 1972 – 24 March 1997

Rainbow is a British children's television series, created by Pamela Lonsdale, which ran from 16 October 1972 until 6 March 1992, made by Thames Television. The series was revived by Tetra Films from 10 January 1994 until 24 March 1997, in two different formats from the original Thames Television series, with differing cast members. The series was originally conceived as a British equivalent of Sesame Street.

The British series was developed in house by Thames Television. It was intended to develop language and social skills for pre-school children and went on to win the Society of Film and Television Arts Award for Best Children's Programme in 1975. It aired five times weekly, originally twice weekly on Mondays and Wednesdays, then switched to Tuesdays and Fridays, and finally once weekly at 12:10 on Fridays on the ITV network.

The show had three producers over its lifetime: Pamela Lonsdale, Charles Warren and Joe Boyer.

The original Thames series has gained cult status and continues to get frequent mentions on radio and television. A few DVDs have been produced, including one celebrating 30 Years of Rainbow.

== Premise ==
Each episode of Rainbow revolved around a particular activity or situation that arose in the Rainbow House, where the main characters lived. Some episodes, particularly in the early years, were purely educational in format and consisted of a series of scenes involving the characters learning about that particular episode's subject. The puppet characters of Zippy, George and Bungle would take the role of inquisitive children asking about the episode's subject, with the presenter (initially David Cook, and from 1974 onwards Geoffrey Hayes) serving the role of teacher figure, educating them about the subject. From the 1980s onwards, most episodes were more story-driven and frequently involved a squabble or dispute of some kind between the puppet characters of Zippy, George and Bungle, and Geoffrey's efforts to calm them down and keep the peace.

The main story was interspersed with songs (most notably from Rod, Jane and Freddy, although the musicians on the show changed several times during its run), animations by Cosgrove Hall Productions and stories read from the Rainbow storybook, usually by Geoffrey (David before 1974). Some episodes focused on a particular topic, such as sounds or opposites, and consisted mainly of short sketches or exchanges between the main characters, rather than a consistent storyline.

== History ==
In 1972, Pamela Lonsdale was asked to create a preschool series for Thames Television. She cast John Kane as presenter and Tim Wylton as a bear named Rainbow. Violet Philpott was cast as the puppeteer of Zippy, with Peter Hawkins providing his voice, as well as those of Sunshine, Bramble and Pillar, but the policy changes after the pilot meant those latter characters were recast. No script was made for the pilot, which led to Hawkins attempting to rewrite gags, difficult for the preschool audience, and would lead to him departing the show after its first year, recommending Roy Skelton to take over. For the first two filmed series, the show was presented by David Cook, with John Leeson as Rainbow, renamed Bungle, and featured songs by the group Telltale.

Philpott left the series after its first year due to suffering a back injury from Zippy's appearances all being through a window. She was replaced by John Thirtle for the second series, and Ronnie Le Drew from 1974 onto the present day. Cook left afterwards due to focusing on his writing career, and was replaced by Geoffrey Hayes. John Leeson also left at this point, replaced as Bungle by Stanley Bates, and Telltale were replaced by the trio of Charlie Dore, Julian Littman and Karl Johnson, who the following year were replaced by the trio that would eventually become Rod, Jane and Freddy. The second series also introduced George, operated by Valerie Herberden and voiced by Roy Skelton. Bungle's appearance was also changed with a completely different head design, more like a teddy bear than the previous grizzly bear look.

Herberden was replaced by Malcolm Lord as George's puppeteer, who Ronnie Le Drew recommended. The format of the show was built upon during this era, with the scripts beginning to move beyond the educational format of the show and focussing more on actual storylines, driven by character comedy rather than educational themes. More of the episodes were written by the cast members themselves, with Roy Skelton, Stanley Bates, Geoffrey Hayes and Freddy Marks all contributing episodes to the show.

In 1989, Rod, Jane & Freddy left the show to concentrate on their own TV series and their touring. Rather than replace them, most episodes became increasingly storyline-driven. Stanley Bates also stepped down from his role as Bungle to contribute as a scriptwriter, with George's puppeteer Malcolm Lord taking over as Bungle. George was now operated by Tony Holtham.

The show came to an end on New Years' Eve 1992, when Thames Television lost the London weekday ITV franchise to Carlton Television. Despite this, the cast continued to make TV appearances throughout 1993, guesting on talk shows as well as promoting the release of the "Raynboe" dance single by Eurobop (a mix of the theme tune set to a techno dance beat) and launching a newspaper campaign for the show to be brought back on air.

A reboot of the show by Tetra Films debuted on Children's ITV on 10 January 1994. The reboot of the show reworked the format and replaced nearly all of the cast members. Geoffrey's presenter role was scrapped altogether and the show instead focused on the characters of Zippy, George and Bungle, now independent of Geoffrey, running a toy shop for an unseen boss called Mr Top. Tetra could not afford Roy Skelton to voice Zippy as well as hiring Ronnie Le Drew to operate him, so Ronnie became Zippy's voice, while George was operated and voiced by Craig Crane. Bungle's appearance was changed and was played by Richard Robinson. An additional puppet character was also introduced in the form of Cleo, a blue female rabbit voiced and operated by Gillian Robic.

After the poor reception to the first reboot, Tetra Films attempted a second reboot in 1996 in association with HTV, reworking the format again into a form closer to that of the original series. Titled Rainbow Days, the new show ditched the toy shop setting and brought the characters back into a house environment, and reintroduced the role of the presenter, with Dale Superville now presenting the show. The character of Cleo was scrapped entirely, and Bungle's role was played by Paul Cullinan. Rainbow Days re-embraced the 'variety show' format of the original series, generally focusing on an educational subject and consisting of scenes with Dale educating the puppet characters about the episode's subject, interspersed with comedic exchanges between Zippy and George in a similar style to the 'Sunshine and Moony' sketches from the earliest series, and songs performed by the whole cast, led by Dale.

== Theme song ==
The theme song for the show was a small part of a full version, also called "Rainbow", written by Hugh Portnow, Lady Hornsbrie, Hugh Fraser and Tim Thomas of the band Telltale, who regularly appeared in the first two series of the show. It was released as a single on an offshoot of the Music for Pleasure label called Surprise, Surprise in 1973 with the B-side "Windy Day". Although Telltale left the show in 1974, their recording of the theme tune continued to be used until the end of the original show's run in 1992.

== Characters ==
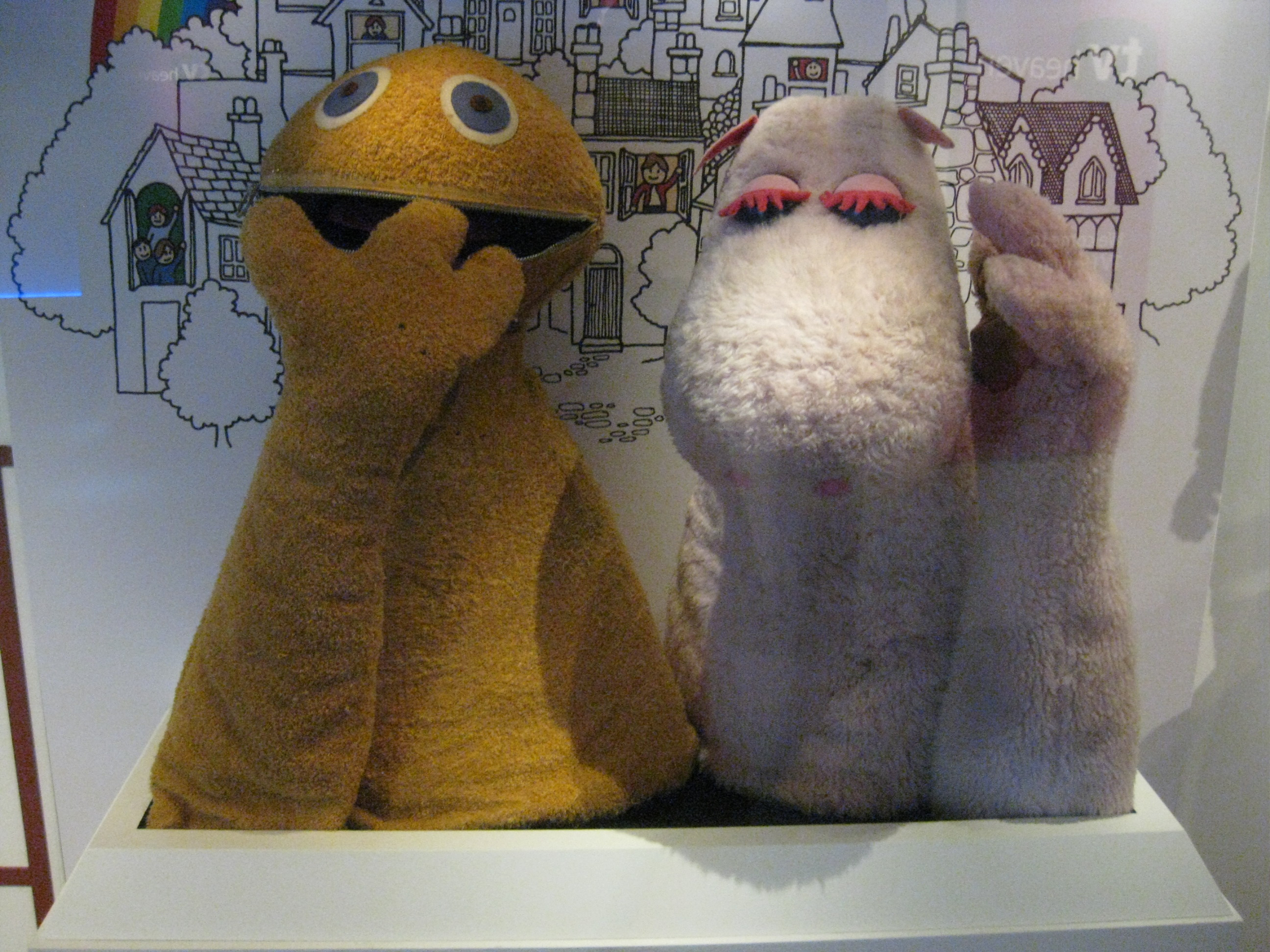
Zippy and George at the National Science and Media Museum

Rainbow featured the following characters, each with their own character style:

- Originally, the presenter was David Cook, but was replaced in 1974 by the better-known Geoffrey Hayes.
- Zippy is an orange humanoid with blue eyes and a zipper on his mouth (hence his name) who's loud and domineering and often obnoxious, but very funny. In most episodes Zippy would act selfishly or behave badly (often having his mouth "zipped" as punishment) but would eventually be taught right from wrong and would end the episode humbled by the wisdom of Geoffrey, Bungle and George. The puppet was originally voiced by Peter Hawkins and operated by Violet Philpott, and later voiced by Roy Skelton, operated by Ronnie Le Drew.
- George is a pink hippopotamus who's shy and slightly camp. He broadly represented sensitivity and introversion, and was generally the foil to Zippy's brashness (puppet; voiced by Roy Skelton and operated by Malcolm Lord, Tony Holtham and later Craig Crane (who voiced the character in the Tetra shows).
- Bungle is a brown furry bear with a squashed face who's inquisitive but also clumsy and usually complains a lot about the other characters. Bungle is a costume rather than a puppet; the character was played by John Leeson (1972-1973), Stanley Bates (1974-1988) and Malcolm Lord (1989-1992) in the Thames TV series and by Richard Robinson and Paul Cullinan in the reboot. The stunt double in the late 1990s was Stuart Nichol.
- Rod, Jane and Freddy are a group of musicians who are regularly featured on the show. When they debuted in 1974 they were 'Rod, Jane and Matt', Matt being Matthew Corbett (of The Sooty Show fame). Matt was replaced from 1977 by Roger Walker, before Freddy Marks, in turn, took over in 1981.
- Sunshine and Moony are optimistic sunshine (yellow with a red hat) and his more gloomy friend (brown with a tuft of yellow hair). They were voiced by Violet Philpott.
- Telltale is a six-piece group who provided the music in the early days of the show. They were a folk-rock band and their repertoire would consist of both original compositions and cover versions.
- Charlie Dore, Julian Littman and Karl Johnson are the singing trio who replaced Telltale in 1974. They stayed with the show before being replaced by Rod, Matt & Jane in 1975.
- Duffy is a white sheepdog and Zippy's short-lived original sidekick for a handful of episodes circa 1972. He was replaced by George in the 1973 series.
- Zippo is Zippy's cousin, identical in appearance to Zippy but slightly brighter in colour, who would make the occasional guest appearance throughout the 1980s and 1990s series. The character was operated by Valerie Heberden, and voiced by Roy Skelton.
- Georgette is a pink female hippo, identical in appearance to George except for her longer eyelashes and floppy hat.
- Aunty was played by Patsy Rowlands, and is apparently Geoffrey's aunt, who he used to stay with as a little boy.
- Dawn was played Dawn Bowden, the neighbour who lived next door. Dawn regularly sung songs on her keyboard and read stories. Dawn joined the programme when Rod, Jane and Freddy departed.
- Christopher was played by Christopher Lillicrap, a semi-regular guest star who would guest on the show from time to time since the 70s, at first to read stories and later to perform songs, which the main cast would join in with.
- Vince was played by Vince Hill, a singer who would occasionally visit the Rainbow House and join in a song with Rod, Jane & Freddy.

== The Christmas tape ==
In 1979, the cast and crew of Rainbow made a special exclusive sketch for the Thames TV staff Christmas tape, sometimes referred to as the "Twangers" episode. This sketch featured some deliberate sexual innuendo and was never shown at the time, as it was never intended to be screened to the general public. The cast later sang "The Plucking Song".

== Home video releases ==
- Thorn EMI Video/Thames Video (1983-1984)
- Video Collection International (1986–1996)
- FremantleMedia (2002–2018)

=== Rainbow (1972–1991) releases ===
Home video title	Release date	Episodes
Rainbow (VC1050)	28 April 1986	Mystery Bag, Pirates, What Happened to Tommy Tucker?, Music (1) – Voice and Hands, Going to the Funfair
Rainbow – Rainbow Goes Camping (TV9920)	3 November 1986	Camping, Dancing, What's Wrong with Bungle?, King for a Day
Rainbow: Small World + Goes Out (TV8002 & TV8003)	5 October 1987	Small World (1), Caterpillars and Butterflies, Looking After Baby, Small World (2), Going Out to the Circus, Going to a Toy Museum, Journey on a Narrow Boat, A Visit to a Safari Park
Rainbow – Down on the Farm (TV9957)	5 October 1987	Down on the Farm, Daydreaming, Going Swimming, A Day in the Country
Rainbow – Christmas Rainbow (TV9987)	5 October 1987	Wrapping/Unwrapping, The Christmas Story, Rainbow Christmas Show
Children's Favourites – Volume 2 (TV8011)	1 February 1988	The Ugly Duckling (compilation VHS with Button Moon and The Sooty Show)
Rainbow – Stories and Rhymes (TV8026)	4 April 1988	The Hare and the Tortoise, Nursery Rhymes (1), Rumpelstiltskin, Nursery Rhymes (2)
Rainbow – Rainbow Christmas Pantomime (TV8042)	7 November 1988	Rainbow Christmas Pantomime, Decorations, A Cold Day
Rainbow – Monster Makes/Guess Who I Am (WP0002)	7 November 1988	Monster Makes, Guess Who I Am
Rainbow – Music (TV8057)	6 February 1989	Music (1), Music (2)
Rainbow with Rod, Jane and Freddy – Stories and Rhymes Volume II (TV8046)	10 April 1989	The Highwayman, Noah's Ark (compilation VHS with Rod, Jane and Freddy)
Children's Favourites Vol. 3 (LL0032)	1 May 1989	Floating and Sinking (compilation VHS with Button Moon and The Sooty Show)
Children's Favourites Vol. 4 (LL0033)	1 May 1989	George's Secret Place (compilation VHS with Button Moon and The Sooty Show)
Rainbow – Music (Lollipop release) (LL0013)	1 May 1989	Music (1), Music (2), Music and Song
Children's Summer Stories (TV8060)	5 June 1989	Journey on a Narrow Boat (compilation VHS with Button Moon and The Sooty Show)
Rainbow – Rainbow Explores (TV8075)	2 October 1989	The Explorers, Ice and Snow, Mazes, Tracks and Trails, Outer Space
Children's Favourites: Bedtime Stories (TV8077)	6 November 1989	Whispers (compilation VHS with Button Moon and The Sooty Show)
Rainbow – Make and Do (TV8085)	5 February 1990	The Toymaker, Worried and Weary, Time and Space, Borrowing
Children's Holiday Favourites (TV8093)	4 June 1990	Family in the Garden (compilation VHS with Rod, Jane and Freddy and The Sooty Show)
Rainbow – Super Bungle and Other Stories (TV8100)	6 August 1990	Super Bungle, Geoffrey Babysits, No Accounting for George, Misbehaving
Rainbow and Rod, Jane and Freddy – Bumper Special (TV8114)	10 September 1990	Neighbours, Bungling Bungle, Practice Makes Perfect (compilation VHS with Rod, Jane and Freddy)
Sooty and Rainbow (WP0025)	1 October 1990	Zipman and Bobbin (compilation VHS with The Sooty Show)
Children's Club: Children's Favourites (KK0005)	4 February 1991	George's Secret Place (compilation VHS with Button Moon and The Sooty Show)
Rainbow – Big Time Video (TV8120)	4 February 1991	Keeping Tidy, Exercise is Fun, Planting Seeds, A Lazy Day, New for Old, Who Done It?
Rainbow with Rod, Jane and Freddy Video Fun Pack (TB0002)	5 August 1991	The Wall (compilation VHS with Rod, Jane and Freddy)
Rainbow and Friends- Friends (WH1026)	7 October 1991	Friends, Why Did You Do That?, The Birthday Cake, Changes
Rainbow with Rod, Jane and Freddy Video Fun Pack Re Release (TB0002)	3 February 1992	The Wall (compilation VHS with Rod, Jane and Freddy)
Rainbow – Zippy's Stories (TV8155)	3 February 1992	Naughty Zippy, Zippy Sets Them Up, Without a Voice, Something to Care For
Rainbow – Sing Song and Other Stories (TV8156)	3 February 1992	Sing Song, Taking Turns, I'm the King of the Castle, Surprise Surprise
Rainbow – Treasure Hunt and Other Stories (TV8163)	1 June 1992	Treasure Hunt, Safety First, Getting Organised, The Zippybread Man
Rainbow – The Seaside Show and Other Stories (TV8164)	1 June 1992	The Seaside Show, A Trip to Spain, Getting in a Muddle, Geoffrey's Big Occasion
The Christmas Collection (TV8165)	5 October 1992	Snow (compilation VHS with The Sooty Show and The Wind in the Willows)
Learn With Rainbow: The Invitation (WP0001)	5 October 1992	The Invitation, If Only We Hadn't
My Little Rainbow (ML0007)	1 April 1996	The Wall (compilation VHS with Rod, Jane and Freddy)
My Little Rainbow: The Seaside Show (ML0016)	1 July 1996	The Seaside Show, A Trip to Spain
My Little Rainbow Christmas Special: Decorations (ML0029)	4 November 1996	Decorations, A Cold Day
Rainbow – Songs, Rhymes, Stories and Tales	2000	Rumpelstilskin, The Ugly Duckling, The Hare and the Tortoise, Sing A Long
Cult Kids Classics	2001	Naughty Zippy (compilation DVD with Chorlton and the Wheelies, Danger Mouse, Count Duckula, Jamie and the Magic Torch and Button Moon)
Cult Kids Classics 2	5 March 2001	Zippy is Tongue Tied (compilation DVD with Jamie and the Magic Torch, Danger Mouse, Chorlton and the Wheelies, Count Duckula and The Sooty Show)
Rainbow – Zippy Sets Them Up	6 August 2001	Zipman and Bobbin, Zippy's in Love, Hot Day, Zippy Sets Them Up, Bungle's High and Mighty Day, Zippy Wants To Be A Comedian, George's Secret Wish
Rainbow – Zip Up Zippy	22 October 2001	Lions and Tigers, Getting Organized, Same and Different, Who Done It, Rejected and Neglected, Social Behaviour (Self), Sympathy
"I Love Cult Kids"	2002	Detectives (compilation DVD with Danger Mouse, Chorlton and the Wheelies, Count Duckula, Jamie and the Magic Torch, Cockleshell Bay and Button Moon)
"Rainbow – My Mate Zippy"	11 March 2002	Zippy is Tongue Tied, Super Bungle, The Show Offs, Zippy's Cover Up Job, Night Out, The Singing Lesson
"Classic Kids Collection"	2002	The Zippybread Man (compilation DVD with Count Duckula, Chorlton and the Wheelies, Button Moon, Jamie and the Magic Torch and Danger Mouse)
"Rainbow – 30th Anniversary Special	2002	The Birthday Cake, I Want to be a Popstar, George's Secret Place, The Explorers, Without a Voice, Outer Space

=== Rainbow (1994–1995) VHS releases ===
VHS title	Release date	Episodes
Rainbow – New Friends and Other Stories (TV8185)	11 April 1994	New Friends, The Customer Is Always Right, Bungle's Blues, All Together Now, Zippy Learns His Lesson
Rainbow – Abracadabra and Other Stories (TV8186)	6 June 1994	What Goes Up Must Come Down, Abracadabra, Breakfast at Rainbow's, Where Did You Get That Hat?, Big, Bigger, Biggest
Rainbow – Bungle's Birthday and Other Stories (TV8187)	8 August 1994	Sugar and Spice, Sneezes and Wheezes, Ping-Pong Perils, Bungle's Birthday, A Small Cat... Astrophe
Rainbow – Three Green Bottles and Other Stories (WP0034)	3 October 1994	The Clock Struck One, The Animals Went in Two by Two, Three Green Bottles, The Wheels on the Bus

== Reruns ==
Episodes of the original Rainbow, dating from the early 1980s, were shown sporadically on the UK satellite television channel Nick Jr. (and/or its sister channel, Nick Jr. 2) between March 2006 and January 2009 as part of its Nick Jr. Classics reruns. A previous repeat run took place on UK Gold (now Gold) from its launch in November 1992 to 1994; these were mostly from the final three series of the programme (without Rod, Jane and Freddy).
