= A. R. Philpott =

The logo of Pantopuck the Puppetman

A.R. (Alexis) Philpott, also known as Pantopuck the Puppet Man or Panto to his friends, was a performer, teacher and researcher/writer on the subject of puppets and puppetry. He wrote several books on the subject, and was instrumental in the development of puppets for educational and therapeutic uses, as well as entertainment, through the Educational Puppetry Association (EPA) and its magazine Puppet Post, which he edited.

His friend Morris Cox, who shared his house, ran his own small press (Gogmagog Press) which published individual sheets of drawing and poetry.

When Panto died 1978, after a long illness, he was the first puppeteer to be honoured in "The Actors' Church" – St. Paul's, Covent Garden, with a plaque embellished with his own artwork – a reproduction of the logo shown right, of himself as a travelling puppeteer.

Panto was survived by his second wife, Violet Philpott (née Yeomans, later Phelan, 1922–2012), whom he had met at Saint Martin's School of Art and married in 1962. She was an acclaimed children's puppeteer and author. Until the frailty of old age overtook her, each spring and summer she was booked to take a folding puppet stage and one or two (overworked) assistants round London parks and play spaces to perform a comic series based around her character Bandicoot.

The couple were described as Theosophists, vegetarians and pacifists, providing a hospitable unworldly environment for their collaborators.

Panto's son Toby Philpott from his first marriage (to the actress and voice teacher Sheila Moriarty) worked with Jim Henson as an animatronic puppet operator, on The Dark Crystal and Labyrinth, and formed part of the team inside the original Jabba the Hutt (before CGI took over).
