= Exit! It's the Way-Out Show =

1967 British TV game show

Exit! It's the Way-Out Show is a British television game show that aired in 1967. It was compered by disc jockey Ed Stewart with hostesses Lesley Judd and Jane Tucker and produced by Associated-Rediffusion. All 13 episodes plus the pilot are missing, believed lost.

== Reception ==
Reading Evening Post television critic Chris Reynolds said Ed Stewart "makes the contestants feel at ease within seconds and proceeds to zip through the questions like a scalded cat" and praised it as "a pleasant enough way to start the evening, even though the questions are ridiculously simple". In a negative review, Western Daily Press's Ian Tabrett criticised Stewart for "forc[ing] the bonhomie so much", stating, "I'm sure the contestants would get on a lot better without him and his forced enthusiasm". Calling the show a "monstrosity", Milton Shulman of the Evening Standard wrote, "It is difficult to define what this show is supposed to be doing unless it is aimed at being an indictment of the British educational system or a glorification of ignorance as a way of life. Week after week young people in their late teens or early twenties are asked to play a game which involves answering questions aimed exclusively at the moron belt."
