= Christmas tape =

Unofficial videotapes compiled by broadcast technical staff

Michael Crawford and Kenneth Kendall hosting White Powder Christmas, the unofficial BBC Christmas tape from 1978

In relation to the television industry, Christmas tapes are unendorsed videotapes compiled by technical staff for their personal amusement and peers' enjoyment. The name originates from the 1950s, when the material was filmed at the staff's Christmas parties where impromptu sketches were carried out. As time progressed, other types of material (such as outtakes and deliberate misbehaviour) were included on the videos.

As videotape gradually overtook film as the dominant medium for television recording, the proliferation of Christmas tapes grew. Early Christmas tapes were plundered for outtake shows like LWT's It'll be Alright on the Night, presented by Denis Norden, which started life as an occasional treat in the schedules and eventually grew to become a genre in their own right. Copies of the tapes were shared over internal playout systems or networked playback, and some then leaked outside, appearing on the private collector's circuit, a phenomenon which led to an incident in 1978 when a mocked-up sequence featuring Princess Anne in that year's BBC Christmas tape, "White Powder Christmas", came to the attention of the Sunday People newspaper. Several references to the previous year's Christmas tape were made in the 1979 BBC Christmas tape, "Good King Memorex".

Some of the most notable examples of the Christmas tape genre were made in the late 1970s and early 1980s, before the digital television era, when VT engineers started recording errors and out-takes to disk – for some viewers who saw these, it was surprising to hear television stars making mistakes and swearing onscreen.

Since then greater control of production facilities along with the deregulation of ITV has all but killed off the Christmas tape phenomenon.

Some examples of the genre include the 1978 Christmas tape from staff at Thames Television which included an especially contrived innuendo-laden edition of the children's show Rainbow and a 1979 Christmas tape from employees of Yorkshire Television which included a send-up of the popular ITV quiz 3-2-1, an adaptation of a popular television commercial of the time from the Italian car manufacturer Fiat and comments about YTV management following the strike which had put the network off the air a few months previously.

The BBC VT inhouse team made Christmas tapes yearly – the ones produced between 1977 and 1997 were commonly watched at Christmas parties. Due to distribution via GPO tower and UK playout, many were recorded off air and are now available. Many pioneering VT effects and now-common standards were trialled in these experimental outputs.

Christmas tapes were also produced by some television stations in Australia and the United States.
