= Stanley Bates =

British actor and screenwriter (born 1942)

- Born: Stanley Kevin Bates; 8 October 1942 (age 84); East Finchley, London, England
- Occupations: Actor and screen writer
- Years active: 1969–present
- Known for: Bungle from Rainbow (1973–1989)

Stanley Kevin Bates (born 8 October 1942 in East Finchley, London) is a British actor and screen writer best known for the role of Bungle, and as a scriptwriter, in the children's television programme, Rainbow between 1973 and 1989, series 2 to series 17. Other credits include roles in Alice's Adventures in Wonderland (1972), Theatre of Blood (1973) and The Tomorrow People.

On 10 March 2001, Bates was bound over to keep the peace following an alleged road rage incident. The incident occurred in May 2000. At the time of the case in 2001 Bates was described as a self-employed lighting manufacturer.
