= Ed Stewart =

British radio presenter (1941–2016)

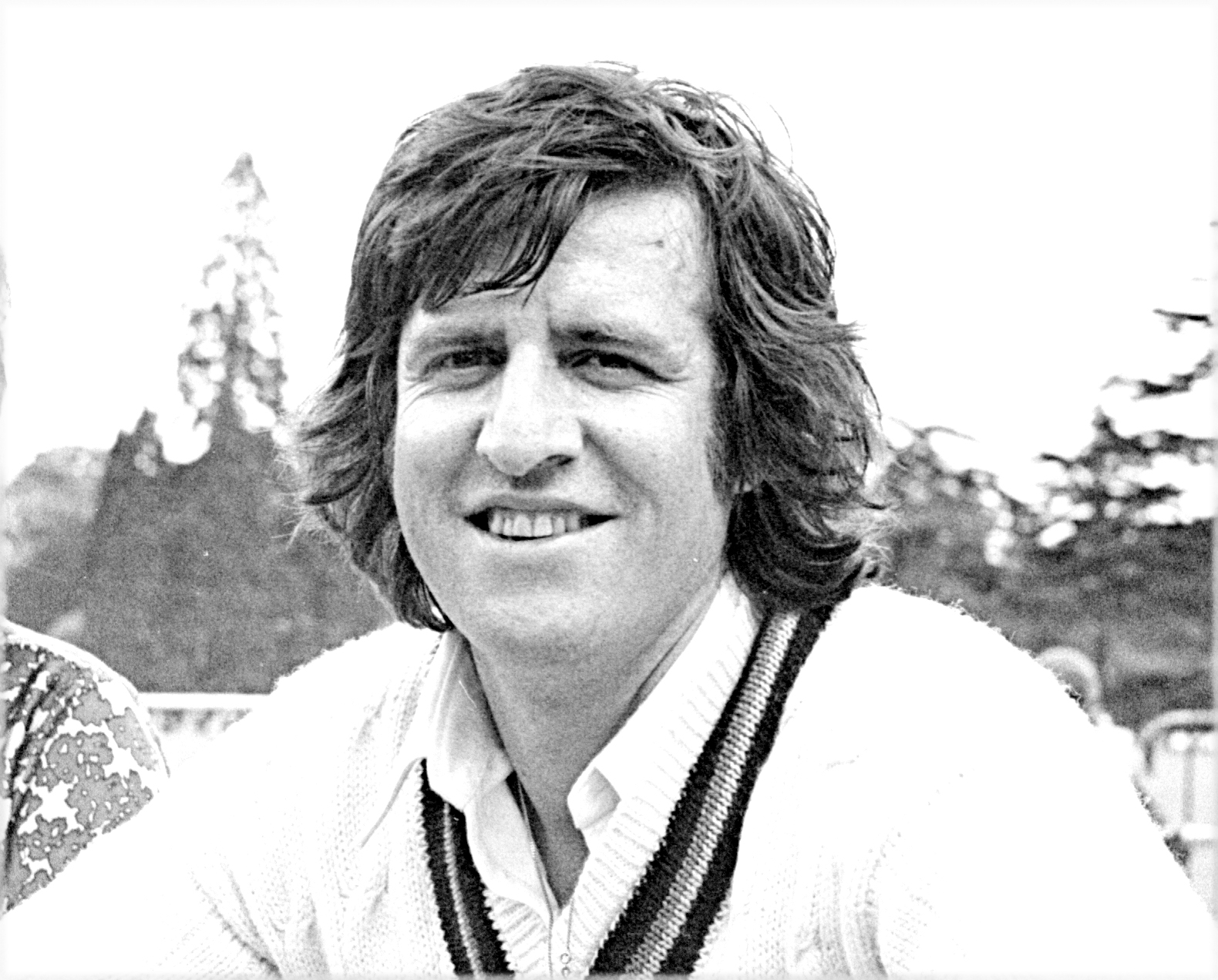
- Stewart in 1976
- Born: Edward Stewart Mainwaring; 23 April 1941; Exmouth, Devon, England
- Died: 9 January 2016 (aged 74); Bournemouth, Dorset, England
- Other name: Stewpot
- Occupation: Broadcaster
- Years active: 1965 – 2016
- Known for: BBC Radio 1 Junior Choice (1968–1979, 2007 40th birthday special, Christmas specials, 2007–2015); BBC Radio 2 Top of the Pops; Crackerjack
- Spouse: Chiara Henney (m. 1974; div. 2005)
- Partner: Elly Thorne (2004-2016, his death)
- Children: 2

Edward Stewart Mainwaring (23 April 1941 – 9 January 2016), known as Ed "Stewpot" Stewart, was an English radio broadcaster and TV presenter. He was principally known for his work with the BBC as a DJ on Radio 1 (notably the Saturday morning show Junior Choice) and Radio 2, and as a presenter on Top of the Pops and Crackerjack both on BBC Television.

== Biography ==
=== Early life and career ===
Stewart was born Edward Stewart Mainwaring, the son of a Treasury solicitor, in Exmouth, Devon, on 23 April 1941. He attended Eagle House School in Sandhurst, Berkshire, and St Edward's School, Oxford, and his broadcasting career began in Hong Kong. While touring there as bass player with a jazz group, he gained a job on a local radio station as a sports commentator, then as an announcer and, finally, as a disc jockey. He remained at this station for four years. In July 1965 Stewart became a DJ on the offshore radio station Radio London (Big L) where he became a household name, and was its chief DJ by the time it closed on 14 August 1967 (owing to the implementation of the Marine, &c., Broadcasting (Offences) Act 1967).

=== Career with BBC Radio and Television ===
After Radio London shut down, Stewart became one of the first DJs to join BBC Radio 1, presenting Happening Sunday and What's New. In 1968, Stewart took over the weekend morning Junior Choice show, where he remained for a dozen years. The show featured Stewart's trademark jingles, including "'Ello Darlin'" and "Happy Birthday to You". In 1968 he recorded the charity single "I Like My Toys", a cover of a song by The Idle Race, as "Stewpot And Save The Children Fund Choir".

In 1972 he also presented Radio 1's Sunday Sport show. In one week in early 1972 he stood in for Alan Freeman on Pick of the Pops, and he sat in for such presenters as David Hamilton and Terry Wogan through the 1970s. On 10 September 1973, Stewart became the first presenter of Radio 1's Newsbeat programme.

Stewart became a regular presenter of the BBC television programme Top of the Pops in 1971. He also presented the children's programme Crackerjack from 1975 to 1979, and had a short-lived programme Ed and Zed in 1970. In 1967, Stewart was the host of the Associated-Rediffusion game show Exit! It's the Way-Out Show.

In 1980 Stewart moved to Radio 2, presenting the weekday afternoon programme from 2 pm to 4 pm. He was dropped from the line-up in October 1983. Stewart said he was "shocked and disappointed" by the decision of Radio 2 controller Bryant Marriott not to renew his contract.

=== Commercial radio ===
Stewart moved to the commercial radio station Radio Mercury (now Heart FM), for six years, presenting their mid-morning show.

=== Back to the BBC ===
Stewart rejoined Radio 2 in 1991, presenting a series of shows before taking over the Saturday afternoon show for the summer. In 1992, he once again presented weekday afternoons. This time, the show was broadcast from 3:30 pm to 5 pm, before moving to 3 pm to 5 pm in the spring of 1996 and 2 pm to 5 pm in the spring of 1998. In 1995, Stewart made radio history when he broadcast his Radio 2 show live from the summits of Ben Nevis and Snowdon, in aid of the Cystic Fibrosis Trust. The senior guide on the ascent, Wayne Naylor, said at the time that Ed Stewart had carried his own equipment and was accompanied by his wife.

In early July 1999, Stewart was taken off the weekday afternoon slot, and moved to his Sunday evening show from 5 pm to 7 pm. At the time the official word was that Stewart had decided to go into semi-retirement, however he later revealed in his autobiography that he was taken off from the programme by then controller Jim Moir. He was replaced in the afternoons by Steve Wright. During this time, Stewart also became a stand in for Terry Wogan on the Breakfast show until late 1999.

His Sunday show was a blend of music and chat, plus listeners' letters and Where Are They Now?, a feature that attempts to re-unite old friends who have lost touch with each other. The show ran until Stewart left Radio 2 in April 2006, not long after his autobiography was published in which he questioned the position of his colleagues Sarah Kennedy and Johnnie Walker on the network. Walker replaced him on Sunday afternoons.

Stewart was back for Radio 2's 40th birthday on Sunday 30 September 2007, hosting Junior Choice. The revival was so successful, that Stewart returned to present Junior Choice on Christmas Eve that year, which led to him hosting further editions of Junior Choice on Christmas Day from 2008 to 2015. Stewart also hosted the afternoon show on Radio Bristol for two days in the run up to Christmas 2001, and also appeared on the Ken Bruce show's Pop Master quiz on Radio 2 on 2 October 2007. Anneka Rice replaced Stewart on the Christmas edition of Junior Choice, from 2017 onwards, after a hiatus in 2016 following his death.

=== Other TV and radio work ===
Stewart, with the London Boy Singers, performed a theme song for the foreign TV series, "Barbapapa" in 1974, and was heard in the English-dubbed version of the series that was produced for BBC Television in January 1975 until its run ended in 1978.

In February 2005, Stewart took over the weekday afternoon show on Spectrum FM, an English-speaking radio station that broadcasts to Spain.

Stewart was heard on Big L 1395 covering for David Hamilton on 18 December 2006, and also in January 2007. He also covered for Mike Read there in March 2007. He presented special shows on Classic Gold on Christmas Day 2006, New Year's Day 2007 and also May Day Bank Holiday Monday 2007. He did a one-off Sunday morning show (10 am – 2 pm) on KCFM in September 2008. He also stood in for Shaun Tilley on his programme "I Haven't Heard It For Ages" (2 pm – 4 pm) on Sundays on KCFM 2008/9.

From February 2009 to September 2009 Stewart presented on Saturday and Sunday mornings between 9 am and noon on Internet radio station Wight FM (this was voicetracked).

Stewart also stood in for Shaun Tilley on the networked show The Retro Chart Years for a week in August 2009 and again in 2010. He also appeared on another of Shaun Tilley's shows The Vintage Top 40 Show, which goes out on various BBC local stations on Sundays at 5 pm.

In July 2014, he took part in a Radio Legends week, presenting a one-off four hour show on BBC Sussex and BBC Surrey.

== Look-in Magazine ==
For many years Stewart was the figurehead for children's magazine Look-in, the "Junior TV Times". Starting in 1971 with a feature on a day in his life, he was brought in as a regular with a feature called "'Stewpot's Look-out", which later became "'Stewpot's Newsdesk". They also used his name in other features such as "Stewpot's Starchart". Newsdesk ended in 1980, as did Stewart's association with the magazine.

== Cameo ==
The voice saying "Excuse me, may I have the pleasure of this dance?" on the original 1973 single "Won't Somebody Dance with Me" by Lynsey de Paul was Stewart's.

== Personal life ==
Stewart's two main interests were playing golf (he often met listeners of his programme who volunteered to caddy for him) and football; he was a supporter of Everton F.C.

In 1975 Stewart was inducted into the entertainment fraternity, the Grand Order of Water Rats.

While working for Jimmy Henney, Stewart met his future wife Chiara, Henney's daughter, who was then aged 13. The couple married four years later, in London, on 2 July 1974, but separated in November 2003 and divorced in 2005. The couple had a daughter, who once appeared with Stewart in a Public Information Film and a son.

From 2004 until his death, Stewart's girlfriend was Elly. She accompanied him on many of his appearances and was with him in the studio for his last edition of his children's show Junior Choice on BBC Radio 2 on Christmas Day 2015.

He was a close friend of Max Bygraves. On Bygraves's death in 2012 he recalled him as a "unique talent" whose skills as a comedian, actor and singer "brought a lot of pleasure to a lot of people".

Stewart was also an advocate and supporter of Phab Ltd, a charity operating in England and Wales which promotes inclusion for children and adults with disabilities. Stewart attended annual events held to raise awareness of Phab's work.

From September 2008 Stewart was the presenter of Mantovani concerts, featuring the Magic of Mantovani Orchestra, which took place at the Lighthouse in Poole, and at the Pavilion Theatre in Bournemouth. On the first two of these, he was joined by co-presenter, Alexandra Bastedo. Also connected with those concerts are his contributions to the filmed documentary Mantovani, King of Strings (Odeon Entertainment) IMDb and on the Radio 2 programme Mantovani by Michael Freedland, broadcast three days before his death on 6 January 2016.

At the time of his death, Stewart was planning to undertake a Stewpot Music Quiz tour of the UK, with his last charity quiz on 6 November 2015 for a local Hampshire hospice.

== Death ==
Two weeks after hosting the 2015 Christmas Day edition of Junior Choice on BBC Radio 2, Stewart died aged 74, on 9 January 2016 in hospital in Bournemouth after suffering a stroke a few days earlier. His funeral was held at St Peter's Church in Bournemouth town centre.

On 10 February 2016 BBC Radio 2 broadcast an hour-long tribute to Stewart introduced by Anneka Rice, who went on to take over the Christmas Day edition of Junior Choice, starting the following year.

== Autobiography ==
- Stewart, Ed (2005), Ed Stewart: Out Of The Stewpot: My Autobiography, John Blake Publishing, ISBN 978-1-84454-086-0
