= List of Rainbow episodes =

Rainbow is a British children's television series, created by Pamela Lonsdale, which ran between five times weekly, twice weekly and once weekly at 12:10 on Tuesdays and Fridays on the ITV network, from 16 October 1972 to 24 March 1997. It was intended to develop language and number skills for pre-school children, and went on to win the Society of Film and Television Arts Award for Best Children's Programme in 1975.

== Series 1 (1972) ==
1. "Shapes" (16 October 1972)
2. "Farm Animals" (17 October 1972)
3. "Houses" (18 October 1972)
4. "Weather (1)" (19 October 1972)
5. "Trains" (20 October 1972)
6. "Painting" (23 October 1972)
7. "Insects" (24 October 1972)
8. "Boats" (25 October 1972)
9. "Land" (26 October 1972)
10. "Clothes" (27 October 1972)
11. "Touch" (30 October 1972)
12. "Reptiles" (31 October 1972)
13. "Work (1)" (1 November 1972)
14. "Books" (2 November 1972)
15. "Furniture (1)" (3 November 1972)
16. "Movement" (6 November 1972)
17. "Fruit and Vegetables" (7 November 1972)
18. "Cats and Dogs" (8 November 1972)
19. "Trees (1)" (9 November 1972)
20. "Sounds (1)" (10 November 1972)
21. "Autumn" (13 November 1972)
22. "Shoes" (14 November 1972)
23. "Flowers" (15 November 1972)
24. "Illness" (16 November 1972)
25. "Music (1)" (17 November 1972)
26. "British Wild Animals" (20 November 1972)
27. "Work (2)" (21 November 1972)
28. "Weather (2)" (22 November 1972)
29. "Sleep" (23 November 1972)
30. "Sounds" (24 November 1972)
31. "Zoo Animals" (27 November 1972)
32. "Family" (28 November 1972)
33. "Water (1)" (29 November 1972)
34. "Building (1)" (30 November 1972)
35. "Making Things" (1 December 1972)
36. "Birds" (4 December 1972)
37. "Post" (5 December 1972)
38. "Fish" (6 December 1972)
39. "Party Food" (7 December 1972)
40. "Smell" (8 December 1972)
41. "Babies (1)" (11 December 1972)
42. "Fireman" (12 December 1972)
43. "Sky" (13 December 1972)
44. "Shopping (1)" (14 December 1972)
45. "Christmas Music" (18 December 1972)
46. "Christmas Tree" (19 December 1972)
47. "Christmas Decorations" (20 December 1972)
48. "Christmas Food" (21 December 1972)
49. "Christmas Post" (22 December 1972)
50. "Indoor Plants" (29 December 1972)

== Series 2 (1973) ==
1. "Movement" (16 April 1973)
2. "Fruit: Oranges and Lemons" (17 April 1973)
3. "Water: Rivers" (18 April 1973)
4. "Horses" (19 April 1973)
5. "Food" (20 April 1973)
6. "Shapes 2" (23 April 1973)
7. "Insects" (24 April 1973)
8. "Trains" (25 April 1973)
9. "Day and Night" (26 April 1973)
10. "Cars" (27 April 1973)
11. "Art: Making Things" (30 April 1973)
12. "Cows and Milk" (1 May 1973)
13. "Books" (2 May 1973)
14. "Seasons: Spring" (3 May 1973)
15. "Farmers and Animals" (4 May 1973)
16. "Reflections" (7 May 1973)
17. "Zoo Animals: Monkeys" (8 May 1973)
18. "Roads and Paths" (9 May 1973)
19. "The Sea" (10 May 1973)
20. "Shopping" (11 May 1973)
21. "Music" (14 May 1973)
22. "Water Birds" (15 May 1973)
23. "Wood: Trees" (16 May 1973)
24. "Weather (3)" (17 May 1973)
25. "Hospitals: Nurses" (18 May 1973)
26. "Senses: Taste" (21 May 1973)
27. "Wild Animals: Lions and Tigers" (22 May 1973)
28. "Aeroplanes" (23 May 1973)
29. "Clothes: Uniform" (24 May 1973)
30. "Musical Instruments 1" (25 May 1973)
31. "Movement: Up and Down" (28 May 1973)
32. "Growing Things" (29 May 1973)
33. "The Dentist" (30 May 1973)
34. "Goldfish" (31 May 1973)
35. "Wheels" (1 June 1973)
36. "Sounds 2" (4 June 1973)
37. "Water (2)" (5 June 1973)
38. "Babies" (6 June 1973)
39. "Birds" (7 June 1973)
40. "Buses" (8 June 1973)
41. "Art: Painting" (11 June 1973)
42. "Trees" (12 June 1973)
43. "Occupations: Dustmen" (13 June 1973)
44. "Elephants, Hippos and Rhinos" (14 June 1973)
45. "Toys" (15 June 1973)
46. "Music: Dancing" (18 June 1973)
47. "The Body (1)" (19 June 1973)
48. "Communications" (20 June 1973)
49. "Flowers" (21 June 1973)
50. "Pets (1)" (22 June 1973)
51. "Shapes 3" (25 June 1973)
52. "Clothes" (26 June 1973)
53. "Bridges" (27 June 1973)
54. "Summer" (28 June 1973)
55. "Holidays" (29 June 1973)
56. "Home" (22 October 1973)
57. "Water (3)" (23 October 1973)
58. "Furniture (2)" (24 October 1973)
59. "Pets (2)" (25 October 1973)
60. "Gardens" (26 October 1973)
61. "Movement: Fast and Slow" (29 October 1973)
62. "Tortoises and Slow Things" (30 October 1973)
63. "Aeroplanes and Fast Things" (31 October 1973)
64. "Harvest Time" (1 November 1973)
65. "Growing Tall" (2 November 1973)
66. "Painting: Spots and Stripes" (5 November 1973)
67. "Animals and Camouflage" (6 November 1973)
68. "Uniforms" (7 November 1973)
69. "Weather (4)" (8 November 1973)
70. "Building (2)" (9 November 1973)
71. "Night Time" (12 November 1973)
72. "Autumn" (13 November 1973)
73. "Hibernating Animals" (15 November 1973)
74. "Newspapers" (16 November 1973)
75. "Movement: In and Out" (19 November 1973)
76. "Birds" (20 November 1973)
77. "Occupations: Crane Drivers" (21 November 1973)
78. "Sea and Ships" (22 November 1973)
79. "Playground" (23 November 1973)
80. "The Body (2)" (26 November 1973)
81. "Hair" (27 November 1973)
82. "Hands" (28 November 1973)
83. "Skin" (29 November 1973)
84. "Feet" (30 November 1973)
85. "Shapes 4" (3 December 1973)
86. "Farm Animals" (4 December 1973)
87. "Lorries" (5 December 1973)
88. "Ponds, Puddles and Pools" (6 December 1973)
89. "Post" (7 December 1973)
90. "Movement: Over and Under" (10 December 1973)
91. "Digging and Burrowing Animals" (11 December 1973)
92. "Communications" (12 December 1973)
93. "Rivers" (13 December 1973)
94. "Machines" (14 December 1973)
95. "Making Things" (17 December 1973)
96. "Christmas Decorations" (18 December 1973)
97. "The Baker" (19 December 1973)
98. "Shopping" (20 December 1973)
99. "Christmas Post" (21 December 1973)
100. "Christmas Music (2)" (24 December 1973)
101. "Christmas Games" (25 December 1973)
102. "Christmas Party (1)" (26 December 1973)
103. "Winter Clothes" (27 December 1973)
104. "Winter" (28 December 1973)

== Series 3 (1974) ==
1. "Transport: General" (4 February 1974)
2. "Transport: Road" (5 February 1974)
3. "Transport: Rail" (6 February 1974)
4. "Transport: Air" (7 February 1974)
5. "Transport: Sea" (8 February 1974)
6. "Occupations" (11 February 1974)
7. "Doctors" (12 February 1974)
8. "Drivers" (13 February 1974)
9. "Shopkeepers" (14 February 1974)
10. "Outdoor Workers" (15 February 1974)
11. "Movement: Fast and Slow" (18 February 1974)
12. "Movement: In and Out" (19 February 1974)
13. "Movement: Under and Over" (20 February 1974)
14. "Movement: Round and Round" (21 February 1974)
15. "Movement: Up and Down" (22 February 1974)
16. "Making Metal Things" (26 February 1974)
17. "Making Wooden Things" (27 February 1974)
18. "Making Glass and Pottery" (28 February 1974)
19. "Making Woollen Clothes" (25 February 1974)
20. "Making Metal Things" (26 February 1974)
21. "Making Wooden Things" (27 February 1974)
22. "Making Glass and Pottery" (28 February 1974)
23. "Spring" (4 March 1974)
24. "Nature: Trees" (5 March 1974)
25. "Nature: Gardens" (6 March 1974)
26. "Nature: Farms" (7 March 1974)
27. "Nature: Wild Animals" (8 March 1974)
28. "Places: General" (15 April 1974)
29. "The Zoo" (16 April 1974)
30. "Places: The Shops" (17 April 1974)
31. "Nature: Farm Animals" (18 April 1974)
32. "Places: The Country Side" (19 April 1974)
33. "Places: Playgrounds/Fairs" (22 April 1974)
34. "Sounds" (22 April 1974)
35. "Musical Sounds" (23 April 1974)
36. "Mechanical Sounds" (24 April 1974)
37. "Weather Sounds" (25 April 1974)
38. "Animal Sounds" (26 April 1974)
39. "Communications: General" (29 April 1974)
40. "Communications: The Voice" (30 April 1974)
41. "Communications: Roads and Bridges" (1 May 1974)
42. "Communications: The Post Office" (2 May 1974)
43. "Communications: Signals" (3 May 1974)
44. "Cats" (6 May 1974)
45. "Big Cats" (7 May 1974)
46. "Farm Animals" (8 May 1974)
47. "Birds" (9 May 1974)
48. "Insects" (10 May 1974)
49. "Home: General" (13 May 1974)
50. "Home: The Family" (14 May 1974)
51. "Home: Shopping" (15 May 1974)
52. "Home: Cooking and Cleaning" (16 May 1974)
53. "Home: Games" (17 May 1974)
54. "Shapes: General" (20 May 1974)
55. "Shapes: The Street" (21 May 1974)
56. "Shapes: Home" (22 May 1974)
57. "Shapes: The Countryside" (23 May 1974)
58. "Shapes: Making Things" (24 May 1974)

== Series 4 (1974–1975) ==
1. "Movement: General" (16 September 1974)
2. "Movement: Fast and Slow" (17 September 1974)
3. "Movement: Round and Round" (18 September 1974)
4. "Movement: Up and Down 2" (19 September 1974)
5. "Movement: Backwards and Forwards" (20 September 1974)
6. "Occupations: Milkman" (23 September 1974)
7. "Occupations: Postman" (24 September 1974)
8. "Occupations: Bus Driver" (25 September 1974)
9. "Occupations: Police" (26 September 1974)
10. "Occupations: Nurse" (27 September 1974)
11. "Farms: The Farmer" (21 October 1974)
12. "Farms: Cows and Milk" (22 October 1974)
13. "Farms: Chickens and Eggs" (23 October 1974)
14. "Farms: Sheep and Pigs" (24 October 1974)
15. "Farms: Horses" (25 October 1974)
16. "Transport: General" (28 October 1974)
17. "Transport: Roads" (29 October 1974)
18. "Transport: Rail" (30 October 1974)
19. "Transport: Air" (31 October 1974)
20. "Transport: Ships" (1 November 1974)
21. "Making: Wood" (25 November 1974)
22. "Making: Cotton" (26 November 1974)
23. "Making: Plastic" (27 November 1974)
24. "Making: Glass and Pottery" (28 November 1974)
25. "Making: Painting" (29 November 1974)
26. "People: At Home" (2 December 1974)
27. "People: Babies" (3 December 1974)
28. "People: Shopping" (4 December 1974)
29. "People: Outings" (5 December 1974)
30. "People: Pets" (6 December 1974)
31. "Weather: Winter Snow" (6 January 1975)
32. "Weather: Spring Rain" (7 January 1975)
33. "Weather: Summer Sun" (8 January 1975)
34. "Weather: Autumn Wind" (9 January 1975)
35. "Weather: Gales and Storms" (10 January 1975)
36. "Shapes: General" (13 January 1975)
37. "Shapes: Street 2" (14 January 1975)
38. "Shapes: Home" (15 January 1975)
39. "Shapes: Body" (16 January 1975)
40. "Shapes: Clothes" (17 January 1975)
41. "Places: Bakery" (10 February 1975)
42. "Places: Shops" (11 February 1975)
43. "Places: Garages" (12 February 1975)
44. "Places: School" (13 February 1975)
45. "Places: Library" (14 February 1975)
46. "Wild Animals: Elephants" (17 February 1975)
47. "Wild Animals: Rhinos and Hippos" (18 February 1975)
48. "Wild Animals: Monkeys" (19 February 1975)
49. "Wild Animals: Giraffes and Zebras" (20 February 1975)
50. "Wild Animals: Penguins, Seals and Whales" (21 February 1975)
51. "Sizes: Tall and Short" (17 March 1975)
52. "Sizes: Full and Empty" (18 March 1975)
53. "Sizes: Heavy and Light" (19 March 1975)
54. "Sizes: Near and Far" (20 March 1975)
55. "Sizes: General" (21 March 1975)
56. "Animals: Rabbits and Hares" (24 March 1975)
57. "Animals: Squirrels and Hedgehogs" (25 March 1975)
58. "Animals: Foxes, Badgers and Deer" (26 March 1975)
59. "Animals: Moles and Voles" (27 March 1975)
60. "Animals: Frogs and Toads" (28 March 1975)
61. "Musical Instruments 2" (21 April 1975)
62. "Sounds: People and Animals" (22 April 1975)
63. "Sounds: Domestic" (23 April 1975)
64. "Sounds: Mechanical" (24 April 1975)
65. "Sounds: Natural" (25 April 1975)
66. "Occupations: Airline Pilot" (28 April 1975)
67. "Occupations: Teacher" (29 April 1975)
68. "Occupations: Fireman" (30 April 1975)
69. "Occupations: Zoo Keeper" (1 May 1975)
70. "Occupations: Dentist" (2 May 1975)
71. "Pastimes: Play" (2 June 1975)
72. "Pastimes: Swimming" (3 June 1975)
73. "Pastimes: Walking" (4 June 1975)
74. "Pastimes: Painting and Making" (5 June 1975)
75. "Pastimes: Collecting" (6 June 1975)

== Series 5 (1975–1976) ==
1. "Shapes: General 2" (8 September 1975)
2. "Shapes: Home 2" (9 September 1975)
3. "Shapes: Shops" (10 September 1975)
4. "Shapes: Useful Things" (11 September 1975)
5. "Shapes: Clothes" (12 September 1975)
6. "Animals: Dogs and Cats" (15 September 1975)
7. "Animals: Lions and Tigers" (16 September 1975)
8. "Animals: Camels" (17 September 1975)
9. "Animals: Beavers" (18 September 1975)
10. "Animals: Small Birds" (19 September 1975)
11. "Makings: Bricks" (13 October 1975)
12. "Makings: Garden" (14 October 1975)
13. "Makings: Cakes" (15 October 1975)
14. "Makings: Boots and Shoes" (16 October 1975)
15. "Makings: Cardboard Boxes" (17 October 1975)
16. "Movement: Up and Down 3" (20 October 1975)
17. "Movement: Fast and Slow" (21 October 1975)
18. "Movement: Backwards and Forwards 2" (22 October 1975)
19. "Movement: Round and Round 2" (23 October 1975)
20. "Movement: General" (24 October 1975)
21. "Places: Factory" (17 November 1975)
22. "Places: High Street" (18 November 1975)
23. "Places: River" (19 November 1975)
24. "Places: Farm" (20 November 1975)
25. "Places: Home" (21 November 1975)
26. "Communications: Roads and Bridges 2" (24 November 1975)
27. "Communications: Newspapers" (25 November 1975)
28. "Communications: Radio" (26 November 1975)
29. "Communications: Post Office 2" (27 November 1975)
30. "Communications: General 2" (28 November 1975)
31. "Christmas Decorations 2" (22 December 1975)
32. "Christmas Post 2" (23 December 1975)
33. "Christmas Present Wrapping" (24 December 1975)
34. "Christmas Music (3)" (25 December 1975)
35. "Christmas Party (2)" (26 December 1975)
36. "The Body: Feet and Legs" (29 December 1975)
37. "The Body: Hands and Arms" (30 December 1975)
38. "The Body: Head" (31 December 1975)
39. "The Body: Hair and Skin" (1 January 1976)
40. "The Body: Head to Foot" (2 January 1976)
41. "Animals: Cats" (26 January 1976)
42. "Animals: Dogs" (27 January 1976)
43. "Animals: Cows" (28 January 1976)
44. "Animals: Pigs" (29 January 1976)
45. "Animals: Sheep" (30 January 1976)
46. "Food: Apples" (2 February 1976)
47. "Food: Potatoes" (3 February 1976)
48. "Food: Bread" (4 February 1976)
49. "Food: Eggs" (5 February 1976)
50. "Food: Milk and Cheese" (6 February 1976)
51. "Opposites: Loud and Soft" (1 March 1976)
52. "Opposites: Wet and Dry" (2 March 1976)
53. "Opposites: Open and Shut" (3 March 1976)
54. "Opposites: Fast and Slow" (4 March 1976)
55. "Opposites: Day and Night" (5 March 1976)
56. "Transport: Bicycles" (8 March 1976)
57. "Transport: Cars" (9 March 1976)
58. "Transport: Boats" (10 March 1976)
59. "Transport: Trains" (11 March 1976)
60. "Transport: Buses" (12 March 1976)
61. "Wild Animals: Lions" (5 April 1976)
62. "Wild Animals: Monkeys" (6 April 1976)
63. "Wild Animals: Kangaroos" (7 April 1976)
64. "Wild Animals: Giraffes" (8 April 1976)
65. "Wild Animals: Elephants" (9 April 1976)
66. "Clothes: Hats" (12 April 1976)
67. "Clothes: Coats" (13 April 1976)
68. "Clothes: Shoes" (14 April 1976)
69. "Clothes: Uniforms" (15 April 1976)
70. "Clothes: Dressing Up" (16 April 1976)
71. "Birds: Garden Birds" (10 May 1976)
72. "Birds: Ostriches" (11 May 1976)
73. "Birds: Penguins" (12 May 1976)
74. "Birds: Ducks" (13 May 1976)
75. "Birds: Sea Birds" (14 May 1976)
76. "Places: Seaside" (17 May 1976)
77. "Places: Railway Station" (18 May 1976)
78. "Places: Parks" (19 May 1976)
79. "Places: Hospital" (20 May 1976)
80. "Places: Farm (2)" (21 May 1976)

== Series 6 (1976–1977) ==
1. "Animals: Goats" (23 August 1976)
2. "Animals: Moles" (24 August 1976)
3. "Animals: Mice" (25 August 1976)
4. "Animals: Squirrels" (26 August 1976)
5. "Animals: Donkeys" (27 August 1976)
6. "Places: School" (30 August 1976)
7. "Places: Playground" (31 August 1976)
8. "Places: Port" (1 September 1976)
9. "Places: Supermarket" (2 September 1976)
10. "Places: Underground" (3 September 1976)
11. "Music: Blowing" (27 September 1976)
12. "Music: Banging" (28 September 1976)
13. "Music: Scraping" (29 September 1976)
14. "Music: Plucking" (30 September 1976)
15. "Music: General" (1 October 1976)
16. "Movement: Over and Under" (4 October 1976)
17. "Movement: Round and Round" (5 October 1976)
18. "Movement: Up and Down" (6 October 1976)
19. "Movement: Backwards and Forwards" (7 October 1976)
20. "Movement: General" (8 October 1976)
21. "Occupations: Veterinary Surgeon" (1 November 1976)
22. "Occupations: Bus Driver" (2 November 1976)
23. "Occupations: Lorry Driver" (3 November 1976)
24. "Occupations: Doctor" (4 November 1976)
25. "Occupations: Milkman" (5 November 1976)
26. "Home: Washing" (8 November 1976)
27. "Home: Shopping" (9 November 1976)
28. "Home: Cooking" (10 November 1976)
29. "Home: Cleaning" (11 November 1976)
30. "Home: General" (12 November 1976)
31. "Seasons: Spring" (6 December 1976)
32. "Seasons: Summer" (7 December 1976)
33. "Seasons: Autumn" (8 December 1976)
34. "Seasons: Winter" (9 December 1976)
35. "Seasons: General" (10 December 1976)
36. "Water: In the Home" (10 January 1977)
37. "Water: Sea and Swimming" (11 January 1977)
38. "Water: Fun" (12 January 1977)
39. "Water: Rivers and Canals" (13 January 1977)
40. "Water: General" (14 January 1977)
41. "Nature: Butterflies" (17 January 1977)
42. "Nature: Bees and Honey" (18 January 1977)
43. "Nature: Spiders" (19 January 1977)
44. "Nature: Fish" (20 January 1977)
45. "Nature: Owls" (21 January 1977)
46. "Positions: Top" (14 February 1977)
47. "Positions: Bottom" (15 February 1977)
48. "Positions: Inside" (16 February 1977)
49. "Positions: Outside" (17 February 1977)
50. "Positions: Middle" (18 February 1977)
51. "Emotions: Happy" (21 February 1977)
52. "Emotions: Sad" (22 February 1977)
53. "Emotions: Cross" (23 February 1977)
54. "Emotions: Worried" (24 February 1977)
55. "Emotions: Caring" (25 February 1977)
56. "Keeping Healthy: Eating" (21 March 1977)
57. "Keeping Healthy: Sleeping" (22 March 1977)
58. "Keeping Healthy: Drinking" (23 March 1977)
59. "Keeping Healthy: Breathing" (24 March 1977)
60. "Keeping Healthy: Growing" (25 March 1977)
61. "Lines" (28 March 1977)
62. "Stripes" (29 March 1977)
63. "Triangles" (30 March 1977)
64. "Squares" (31 March 1977)
65. "Circles" (1 April 1977)
66. "Family and Friends: Mother" (25 April 1977)
67. "Family and Friends: Father" (26 April 1977)
68. "Family and Friends: Grandparents" (27 April 1977)
69. "Family and Friends: Brothers and Sisters" (28 April 1977)
70. "Family and Friends: Friends" (29 April 1977)
71. "The Home: Kitchen" (2 May 1977)
72. "The Home: Bathroom" (3 May 1977)
73. "The Home: Living Room" (4 May 1977)
74. "The Home: Bedroom" (5 May 1977)
75. "The Home: General" (6 May 1977)
76. "Growing: Underground" (30 May 1977)
77. "Growing: Overground" (31 May 1977)
78. "Shopping: Greengrocers" (1 June 1977)
79. "Cooking and Eating" (2 June 1977)
80. "Vegetables" (3 June 1977)
81. "Seaside: The Journey" (6 June 1977)
82. "Seaside: Water and Waves" (7 June 1977)
83. "Seaside: Things to be Found" (8 June 1977)
84. "Seaside: Things to Do" (9 June 1977)
85. "Seaside: The Harbour" (10 June 1977)

== Series 7 (1977–1978) ==
1. "Pull" (26 December 1977)
2. "Push" (27 December 1977)
3. "Lift" (28 December 1977)
4. "Stretch" (29 December 1977)
5. "Winding" (30 December 1977)
6. "Animals Homes: Nests" (2 January 1978)
7. "Animals Homes: Holes" (3 January 1978)
8. "Animals Homes: Shells" (4 January 1978)
9. "Animals Homes: Ponds" (5 January 1978)
10. "Animals Homes: General" (6 January 1978)
11. "Crawling" (30 January 1978)
12. "Walking" (31 January 1978)
13. "Running" (1 February 1978)
14. "Jumping" (2 February 1978)
15. "Bouncing" (3 February 1978)
16. "Nose" (6 February 1978)
17. "Ears" (7 February 1978)
18. "Eyes" (8 February 1978)
19. "Mouth" (9 February 1978)
20. "Fingers" (10 February 1978)
21. "Own" (6 March 1978)
22. "Take" (7 March 1978)
23. "Give" (8 March 1978)
24. "Share" (9 March 1978)
25. "Choose" (10 March 1978)
26. "Underneath the Street" (13 March 1978)
27. "Buildings" (14 March 1978)
28. "People" (15 March 1978)
29. "Pleasure" (16 March 1978)
30. "Nature" (17 March 1978)
31. "Straight" (10 April 1978)
32. "Bend" (11 April 1978)
33. "Corner" (12 April 1978)
34. "Edge" (13 April 1978)
35. "Through" (14 April 1978)
36. "Small" (17 April 1978)
37. "Large" (18 April 1978)
38. "Fat" (19 April 1978)
39. "Thin" (20 April 1978)
40. "Size" (21 April 1978)
41. "River: Flow" (15 May 1978)
42. "River: Floating" (16 May 1978)
43. "River: In the Water" (17 May 1978)
44. "River: Patterns" (18 May 1978)
45. "River: Sides" (19 May 1978)
46. "Putting Together: Toys" (22 May 1978)
47. "Putting Together: Shapes" (23 May 1978)
48. "Putting Together: Domestic" (24 May 1978)
49. "Putting Together: Clothes" (25 May 1978)
50. "Putting Together: Work" (26 May 1978)
51. "Positions: Under" (19 June 1978)
52. "Positions: Over" (20 June 1978)
53. "Positions: Above" (21 June 1978)
54. "Positions: Below" (22 June 1978)
55. "Positions: Between" (23 June 1978)
56. "Fastening" (26 June 1978)
57. "Brushing" (27 June 1978)
58. "Washing" (28 June 1978)
59. "Polishing" (29 June 1978)
60. "Dressing" (30 June 1978)
61. "Safari Park" (1 July 1978)

== Series 8 (1978–1979) ==
1. "Wet" (2 October 1978)
2. "Dry" (3 October 1978)
3. "Liquid" (4 October 1978)
4. "Solid" (5 October 1978)
5. "General 2" (6 October 1978)
6. "Mary Mary" (9 October 1978)
7. "Ride a Cockhorse" (10 October 1978)
8. "Humpty Dumpty" (11 October 1978)
9. "Cock a Doodle Doo" (12 October 1978)
10. "Sing a Song of Sixpence" (13 October 1978)
11. "Wild Animals" (7 November 1978)
12. "Dolphinarium" (8 November 1978)
13. "Picnic and Games" (9 November 1978)
14. "Animals: Domestic" (10 November 1978)
15. "Rough" (13 November 1978)
16. "Smooth" (14 November 1978)
17. "Hard" (15 November 1978)
18. "Soft" (16 November 1978)
19. "General 3" (17 November 1978)
20. "Fairies" (11 December 1978)
21. "Gnomes and Elves" (12 December 1978)
22. "Witches" (13 December 1978)
23. "Dragons" (14 December 1978)
24. "Giants 1" (15 December 1978)
25. "Invitations" (18 December 1978)
26. "Hats" (19 December 1978)
27. "Food and Drink" (20 December 1978)
28. "Music and Games" (21 December 1978)
29. "Party" (22 December 1978)
30. "Ding Dong Bell" (15 January 1979)
31. "Little Jack Horner" (16 January 1979)
32. "Crooked Man" (17 January 1979)
33. "Little Bo Peep" (18 January 1979)
34. "Pata Cake" (19 January 1979)
35. "Going Abroad: Viena" (22 January 1979)
36. "Going Abroad: Viena 2" (23 January 1979)
37. "Going Abroad: Viena 3" (24 January 1979)
38. "Going Abroad: Viena 4" (25 January 1979)
39. "Going Abroad: Viena 5" (26 January 1979)
40. "Not Well" (19 February 1979)
41. "Lost" (20 February 1979)
42. "Accident" (21 February 1979)
43. "Visit" (22 February 1979)
44. "Mum and Dad Go Out" (23 February 1979)
45. "Oneness of One" (26 February 1979)
46. "Twoness of Two" (27 February 1979)
47. "Threeness of Three" (28 February 1979)
48. "Fourness of Four" (1 March 1979)
49. "Fiveness of Five" (2 March 1979)
50. "Waking Time" (26 March 1979)
51. "Washing Time" (27 March 1979)
52. "Meal Time" (28 March 1979)
53. "Spare Time" (29 March 1979)
54. "Bed Time" (30 March 1979)
55. "Nature: Sounds" (2 April 1979)
56. "People 2" (3 April 1979)
57. "Animals" (4 April 1979)
58. "Music 5" (5 April 1979)
59. "Machines" (6 April 1979)
60. "Snow and Ice: Clothing" (25 April 1979)
61. "Mischievous" (30 April 1979)
62. "Greedy" (1 May 1979)
63. "Helpful" (2 May 1979)
64. "Selfish" (3 May 1979)
65. "Untidy" (4 May 1979)
66. "Single" (7 May 1979)
67. "Co-Operative: Peers" (8 May 1979)
68. "Co-Operative: Parents" (9 May 1979)
69. "Competition" (10 May 1979)
70. "Group" (11 May 1979)
71. "Long" (4 June 1979)
72. "Short" (5 June 1979)
73. "Full" (6 June 1979)
74. "Empty" (7 June 1979)
75. "General 4" (8 June 1979)
76. "First" (11 June 1979)
77. "Last" (12 June 1979)
78. "Leading" (13 June 1979)
79. "Following" (14 June 1979)
80. "Behind" (15 June 1979)

== Series 9 (1979–1980) ==
1. "1,2,3,4,5" (26 October 1979)
2. "How" (29 October 1979)
3. "Why" (30 October 1979)
4. "When" (31 October 1979)
5. "Where" (1 November 1979)
6. "Who" (2 November 1979)
7. "Excited" (26 November 1979)
8. "Miserable" (27 November 1979)
9. "Lonely" (28 November 1979)
10. "Awkward" (29 November 1979)
11. "Brave" (30 November 1979)
12. "Arms" (3 December 1979)
13. "Legs" (4 December 1979)
14. "Neck and Head" (5 December 1979)
15. "Shoulders" (6 December 1979)
16. "Wrists and Ankles" (7 December 1979)
17. "Rainbow Xmas Show" (17 December 1979)
18. "Snow and Ice: Where and When" (31 December 1979)
19. "Snow and Ice: What" (2 January 1980)
20. "Snow and Ice: Movement On" (9 January 1980)
21. "Snow and Ice: Things To Do" (14 January 1980)
22. "How Do You: Hop and Skip" (21 January 1980)
23. "How Do You: Ride a Bike" (23 January 1980)
24. "How Do You: Swim" (28 January 1980)
25. "How Do You: Swing" (30 January 1980)
26. "Little Tommy Tucker" (4 February 1980)
27. "Baa Baa Black Sheep" (6 February 1980)
28. "London Bridge" (11 February 1980)
29. "To Market" (13 February 1980)
30. "If I Was as Fat As" (18 February 1980)
31. "If I Was as Thin As" (20 February 1980)
32. "If I Was as Tall As" (25 February 1980)
33. "If I Was as Small As" (27 February 1980)
34. "If I Was as Strong As" (3 March 1980)
35. "Safety: In the Home" (5 March 1980)
36. "Safety: In the Street" (10 March 1980)
37. "Safety: At the Park" (12 March 1980)
38. "Safety: Playing with Toys" (17 March 1980)
39. "Safety: At Work" (19 March 1980)
40. "School Days" (24 March 1980)
41. "Dad's Work" (26 March 1980)
42. "Market Day" (31 March 1980)
43. "Things to do" (2 April 1980)
44. "Visiting Friends" (7 April 1980)
45. "Nursery Rhymes: Blow" (9 April 1980)
46. "Nursery Rhymes: Quick" (14 April 1980)
47. "Nursery Rhymes: Pop" (16 April 1980)
48. "Nursery Rhymes: New" (21 April 1980)
49. "Nursery Rhymes: Harm" (23 April 1980)
50. "Windy" (28 April 1980)
51. "Cloudy" (30 April 1980)
52. "Showery" (5 May 1980)
53. "Stormy" (7 May 1980)
54. "Sunny" (12 May 1980)
55. "Why Do I Hide" (14 May 1980)
56. "Why Do I Rush Around" (19 May 1980)
57. "Why Do I Get Shy" (21 May 1980)
58. "Why Do I Shout" (26 May 1980)
59. "Why Do I Cry" (28 May 1980)
60. "Pets: Dogs" (2 June 1980)
61. "Pets: Cats" (4 June 1980)
62. "Pets: Mice" (9 June 1980)
63. "Pets: Goldfish" (11 June 1980)
64. "Pets: Tortoises" (16 June 1980)
65. "Traditional Tales: Jack and the Beanstalk" (18 June 1980)
66. "Traditional Tales: Goldilocks" (23 June 1980)
67. "Traditional Tales: Babes in the Wood" (25 June 1980)
68. "Traditional Tales: Cinderella" (30 June 1980)
69. "Traditional Tales: Little Red Riding Hood" (2 July 1980)

== Series 10 (1980–1981) ==
1. "How Do You: Throw" (16 October 1980)
2. "Aesop's Fables: Disobedient Donkey" (24 November 1980)
3. "Aesop's Fables: Hare and Tortoise" (26 November 1980)
4. "Aesop's Fables: The Fox and the Stork" (1 December 1980)
5. "Aesop's Fables: The Boy Who Cried Wolf" (3 December 1980)
6. "Aesop's Fables: Wolf in Sheep's Clothing" (8 December 1980)
7. "Aesop's Fables: The Ant and the Dove" (10 December 1980)
8. "Actions: Dropping Things" (15 December 1980)
9. "Actions: Losing Things" (17 December 1980)
10. "Daydreams" (21 December 1980)
11. "Nightdreams" (24 December 1980)
12. "Rainbow Christmas" (26 December 1980)
13. "Actions: Bumping Into" (29 December 1980)
14. "Actions: Breaking Things" (31 December 1980)
15. "Filling: Polly Put the Kettle On" (5 January 1981)
16. "Bare: Old Mother Hubbard" (7 January 1981)
17. "Striking: Hickory Dickory Dock" (12 January 1981)
18. "Merry: Old King Cole" (14 January 1981)
19. "Buying and Selling: Simple Simon" (19 January 1981)
20. "Play: Boys and Girls" (21 January 1981)
21. "Succeeding" (26 January 1981)
22. "Failing" (28 January 1981)
23. "Understanding" (2 February 1981)
24. "Confusion" (4 February 1981)
25. "Houses: Straw" (9 February 1981)
26. "Houses: Wood" (11 February 1981)
27. "Houses: Brick" (16 February 1981)
28. "Houses: Tents" (18 February 1981)
29. "Do What I Do" (23 February 1981)
30. "Aesop's Fables: The Goose That Laid the Golden Egg" (25 February 1981)
31. "Aesop's Fables: The Dog and the Shadow" (2 March 1981)
32. "Aesop's Fables: The Fox and the Goat" (4 March 1981)
33. "Aesop's Fables: The Fir-Tree and the Bramble" (9 March 1981)
34. "Do as I Say" (11 March 1981)
35. "Come Dance with Me" (16 March 1981)
36. "Let's Sing Together" (18 March 1981)
37. "Can/Can't" (23 March 1981)
38. "Won't/Will" (25 March 1981)
39. "Don't Know/Knowing" (30 March 1981)
40. "Love" (1 April 1981)
41. "Don't Want To" (6 April 1981)
42. "Hate" (8 April 1981)
43. "Hardly Ever" (13 April 1981)
44. "Often" (15 April 1981)
45. "Always" (20 April 1981)
46. "Never" (22 April 1981)
47. "Holding" (27 April 1981)
48. "Stroking" (29 April 1981)
49. "Toys II" (4 May 1981)
50. "Bits and Pieces 3" (6 May 1981)
51. "What Shall I Play With" (11 May 1981)
52. "What Shall I Wear" (13 May 1981)
53. "What Shall I Eat" (18 May 1981)
54. "What Shall I Make" (20 May 1981)
55. "Trip 1: Space" (25 May 1981)
56. "Trip 2: Underground" (27 May 1981)
57. "Trip 3: Seaside" (1 June 1981)
58. "Trip 4: By Plane" (3 June 1981)
59. "Looking" (8 June 1981)
60. "Listening" (10 June 1981)
61. "Getting In" (15 June 1981)
62. "Getting Out" (17 June 1981)
63. "Taste" (22 June 1981)
64. "Smell" (24 June 1981)
65. "Careful" (29 June 1981)
66. "Contrary" (1 July 1981)
67. "Stubborn" (6 July 1981)
68. "Slow" (8 July 1981)
69. "Grumpy" (13 July 1981)
70. "Mean" (15 July 1981)
71. "Quick" (20 July 1981)
72. "Lazy" (22 July 1981)

== Series 11 (1981–1982) ==
1. "Counting 1" (12 October 1981)
2. "Counting 2" (14 October 1981)
3. "Right" (19 October 1981)
4. "Wrong" (21 October 1981)
5. "Music 7" (26 October 1981)
6. "Music 8" (28 October 1981)
7. "Right Tools for the Job: Part 1" (2 November 1981)
8. "Right Tools for the Job: Part 2" (4 November 1981)
9. "Busy" (9 November 1981)
10. "Hasty" (11 November 1981)
11. "Different Things, Same Name: Part 1" (16 November 1981)
12. "Different Things, Same Name: Part 2" (18 November 1981)
13. "Holes: Part 1" (23 November 1981)
14. "Holes: Part 2" (25 November 1981)
15. "Shadows" (30 November 1981)
16. "Reflections" (2 December 1981)
17. "Movement: Part 1" (7 December 1981)
18. "Movement: Part 2" (9 December 1981)
19. "Give It a Try" (14 December 1981)
20. "Jobs Mums and Dads Do" (16 December 1981)
21. "Frustration" (21 December 1981)
22. "Calm and Relaxed" (23 December 1981)
23. "Winter/Spring" (28 December 1981)
24. "Summer/Autumn" (30 December 1981)
25. "Other People Who Help" (4 January 1982)
26. "Caring About" (6 January 1982)
27. "Wondering" (11 January 1982)
28. "Anticipation" (13 January 1982)
29. "Collection" (18 January 1982)
30. "Delivery" (20 January 1982)
31. "The Whiners" (25 January 1982
32. "The Know-It-Alls" (27 January 1982)
33. "The Moodies" (1 February 1982)
34. "Bossy Boots" (3 February 1982)
35. "Can I" (8 February 1982)
36. "Must I" (10 February 1982)
37. "Tricks and Jokes" (15 February 1982)
38. "Magic" (17 February 1982)
39. "Juggling and Balancing" (22 February 1982)
40. "Clowning" (24 February 1982)
41. "Who Saw It" (1 March 1982)
42. "Who Heard It" (3 March 1982)
43. "Living Together: Part 1" (8 March 1982)
44. "Living Together: Part 2" (10 March 1982)
45. "Facial Disguises" (15 March 1982)
46. "Body Costumes" (17 March 1982)
47. "High in the Sky" (22 March 1982)
48. "Under the Sea" (24 March 1982)
49. "In the Ground" (29 March 1982)
50. "On Top of the Mountain" (31 March 1982)
51. "Sardines in a Tin" (5 April 1982)
52. "Room to Spread" (7 April 1982)
53. "Fit and Healthy: Part 1" (12 April 1982)
54. "Fit and Healthy: Part 2" (14 April 1982)
55. "Invisible" (19 April 1982)
56. "Hanging On" (21 April 1982)
57. "Mystery Bag" (26 April 1982)
58. "Vanishing Box" (28 April 1982)
59. "The Abuse of George" (3 May 1982)
60. "George Won't Ask" (5 May 1982)

== Series 12 (1983) ==
1. "Blowing" (7 January 1983)
2. "Pumping" (14 January 1983)
3. "Getting Up Out of Bed" (21 January 1983)
4. "Going to Bed" (28 January 1983)
5. "Giving" (4 February 1983)
6. "Receiving" (11 February 1983)
7. "Counting Rhymes: Part 1" (18 February 1983)
8. "Counting Rhymes: Part 2" (25 February 1983)
9. "Who Lost It" (4 March 1983)
10. "Who Took It" (11 March 1983)
11. "Keeping Things Clean" (18 March 1983)
12. "Getting Things Dirty" (25 March 1983)
13. "What Happened to Jack And Jill" (1 April 1983)
14. "What Happened to Tommy Tucker" (8 April 1983)
15. "Physical Differences: Size" (15 April 1983)
16. "Physical Differences: Shape" (22 April 1983)
17. "Pirates" (29 April 1983)
18. "Individual Needs" (6 May 1983)
19. "Basic Needs" (13 May 1983)
20. "Spacemen" (20 May 1983)
21. "Make Up Your Mind" (27 May 1983)
22. "Going Somewhere" (3 June 1983)
23. "Anxious/Worried" (10 June 1983)
24. "Carefree" (17 June 1983)
25. "Hiccups" (24 June 1983)
26. "Sneezing" (1 July 1983)
27. "Going to the Funfair" (8 July 1983)
28. "Guessing Games" (15 July 1983)
29. "Balloons and Kites" (22 July 1983)
30. "Day Trip to France" (29 July 1983)
31. "Going Swimming" (7 August 1983)
32. "Colours: Blue" (12 August 1983)
33. "Colours: Green" (19 August 1983)
34. "Colours: Yellow" (26 August 1983)
35. "Colours: Red" (2 September 1983)
36. "Scarecrows" (9 September 1983)
37. "Musical Instruments 3" (16 September 1983)
38. "Things Are Not What They Seem" (23 September 1983)
39. "Singalong" (30 September 1983)
40. "Going to the Toy Museum" (7 October 1983)
41. "Cuddles" (14 October 1983)
42. "Dabbing and Dotting" (21 October 1983)
43. "Gardening" (28 October 1983)
44. "Falling" (4 November 1983)
45. "Bits and Pieces 2" (11 November 1983)
46. "Fast Food" (18 November 1983)
47. "Family Relationships" (25 November 1983)
48. "Odds and Ends" (2 December 1983)
49. "Bells" (9 December 1983)
50. "Wrapping/Unwrapping" (16 December 1983)
51. "Going Out to the Circus" (30 December 1983)

== Series 13 (1984) ==
1. "Visitors" (6 January 1984)
2. "Let's Make a Musical" (13 January 1984)
3. "Geoffrey's Not Well" (20 January 1984)
4. "Wild Animals" (27 January 1984)
5. "Lost My Voice" (3 February 1984)
6. "Bicycles" (10 February 1984)
7. "Above and Below" (17 February 1984)
8. "Giants" (24 February 1984)
9. "Waiting" (2 March 1984)
10. "Clouds" (9 March 1984)
11. "Lost My Hearing" (16 March 1984)
12. "Having a Good Time" (23 March 1984)
13. "Stars" (30 March 1984)
14. "Not Enough to Go Round" (6 April 1984)
15. "Having a Bad Time" (13 April 1984)
16. "Cooking" (20 April 1984)
17. "Furniture (3)" (27 April 1984)
18. "What I Would Like To Be" (11 May 1984)
19. "Over And Under" (18 May 1984)
20. "The Weekend" (25 May 1984)
21. "Trees and Flowers" (1 June 1984)
22. "Shopping 2" (8 June 1984)
23. "Life's Ups and Downs" (15 June 1984)
24. "Keep Britain Tidy" (22 June 1984)
25. "Pets 2" (29 June 1984)
26. "Arguments" (6 July 1984)
27. "Changes 2" (13 July 1984)
28. "All of a Dither" (20 July 1984)
29. "Robots" (27 July 1984)
30. "Looking After Yourself" (3 August 1984)
31. "Accidents" (10 August 1984)
32. "Bungle's High and Mighty Day" (17 August 1984)
33. "Rules" (24 August 1984)
34. "Hot Day" (7 September 1984)
35. "Looking Back" (14 September 1984)
36. "Friendship" (21 September 1984)
37. "Frowns and Tears" (28 September 1984)
38. "Games" (5 October 1984)
39. "Zippy's Cover Up Job" (12 October 1984)
40. "Dressing Up" (9 November 1984)
41. "Light and Dark" (16 November 1984)
42. "If Only I Hadn't" (23 November 1984)
43. "A Cold Day" (30 November 1984)
44. "George's Secret Wish" (7 December 1984)
45. "If Only I Had" (14 December 1984)

== Series 14 (1985) ==
1. "I Like Being Me" (4 January 1985)
2. "Looking Back: Remember When" (11 January 1985)
3. "Money" (18 January 1985)
4. "Why Worry" (25 January 1985)
5. "Music 6" (1 February 1985)
6. "The Saver" (8 February 1985)
7. "Fruits" (15 February 1985)
8. "Paste and Wax" (22 February 1985)
9. "Books 2" (1 March 1985)
10. "Newborn" (8 March 1985)
11. "Growing 2" (15 March 1985)
12. "Independence" (22 March 1985)
13. "Dancing" (12 April 1985)
14. "Wool and String" (19 April 1985)
15. "Someone New in the Family" (26 April 1985)
16. "High Street: Looking Around" (3 May 1985)
17. "Parting and Goodbyes" (10 May 1985)
18. "Flowers" (17 May 1985)
19. "High Street: Looking Up and Down" (24 May 1985)
20. "Jumble Sale" (31 May 1985)
21. "Caterpillars and Butterflies" (7 June 1985)
22. "Camping Preparation" (14 June 1985)
23. "Camping" (21 June 1985)
24. "Work That Mum Does" (28 June 1985)
25. "Insects 2" (5 July 1985)
26. "Staying Away From Home" (12 July 1985)
27. "Meeting and Greetings" (19 July 1985)
28. "Garden Fete" (26 July 1985)
29. "Work That Dad Does" (2 August 1985)
30. "Wheels" (9 August 1985)
31. "Hands" (16 August 1985)
32. "Daydreaming" (23 August 1985)
33. "The Waster" (30 August 1985)
34. "Wall Painting" (6 September 1985)
35. "Journey on a Narrow Boat" (13 September 1985)
36. "Shapes 2" (20 September 1985)
37. "Old Mother Hubbard" (27 September 1985)
38. "What's Wrong with Bungle" (4 October 1985)
39. "Parcel Post" (11 October 1985)
40. "Over Helpful" (18 October 1985)
41. "George's Secret Place" (25 October 1985)
42. "Where Does Milk Come From" (1 November 1985)
43. "Scribbles and Doodles" (8 November 1985)
44. "Protection" (15 November 1985)
45. "Hair" (22 November 1985)
46. "Books: The Library" (29 November 1985)
47. "The Singing Lesson" (6 December 1985)
48. "Zippy is Tongue Tied" (13 December 1985)
49. "The Christmas Story" (20 December 1985)

== Series 15 (1986) ==
1. "Puff and Blow" (10 January 1986)
2. "Packaging" (17 January 1986)
3. "Feet" (24 January 1986)
4. "Communication 1" (31 January 1986)
5. "Wool" (7 February 1986)
6. "General Farm: Eggs" (14 February 1986)
7. "Discovery" (21 February 1986)
8. "Bungle's Pretend Friend" (28 February 1986)
9. "Puzzles and Games" (7 March 1986)
10. "Sounds" (14 March 1986)
11. "King for a Day" (21 March 1986)
12. "The Show Offs" (4 April 1986)
13. "Teeth" (11 April 1986)
14. "Guess What" (18 April 1986)
15. "Uncertainty" (25 April 1986)
16. "Detectives" (2 May 1986)
17. "Flexibility" (9 May 1986)
18. "The Explorers" (16 May 1986)
19. "Evaluating" (23 May 1986)
20. "A Day in the Country" (30 May 1986)
21. "Decision Making" (6 June 1986)
22. "Journey by Coach" (13 June 1986)
23. "Resourcefulness" (20 June 1986)
24. "Guess Where" (27 June 1986)
25. "Mice" (4 July 1986)
26. "Sports Day" (11 July 1986)
27. "Looking After Baby" (18 July 1986)
28. "Working Things Out" (25 July 1986)
29. "Touch and Feel" (1 August 1986)
30. "Being Sensible" (8 August 1986)
31. "Special Times" (15 August 1986)
32. "Africa" (22 August 1986)
33. "Italian" (29 August 1986)
34. "Favourite Things" (5 September 1986)
35. "Hard Worker" (12 September 1986)
36. "Mirrors" (19 September 1986)
37. "Indian" (26 September 1986)
38. "Horses II" (3 October 1986)
39. "Party Preparation" (10 October 1986)
40. "1000th Birthday Party" (17 October 1986)
41. "Multi Cultural: Chinese" (24 October 1986)
42. "Geoffrey Gets It Wrong" (31 October 1986)
43. "Getting Your Own Way" (7 November 1986)
44. "Nursery Rhymes 1" (14 November 1986)
45. "Falling Out and Making Up" (21 November 1986)
46. "What Shall We Do" (28 November 1986)
47. "Caring for Others" (5 December 1986)
48. "Nursery Rhymes 2" (12 December 1986)
49. "Visit to the Theatre" (19 December 1986)
50. "Rainbow Christmas Show" (26 December 1986)

== Series 16 (1987) ==
1. "Keeping the Peace" (9 January 1987)
2. "Creativity" (16 January 1987)
3. "Highwayman" (23 January 1987)
4. "How" (30 January 1987)
5. "Machines" (6 February 1987)
6. "Family Ties" (13 February 1987)
7. "Cats" (20 February 1987)
8. "I Want to Be a Pop Star" (27 February 1987)
9. "What Happens If" (6 March 1987)
10. "If I Were Invisible" (13 March 1987)
11. "Small World" (20 March 1987)
12. "Helping Out" (27 March 1987)
13. "Visit to a Safari Park" (3 April 1987)
14. "Easter" (10 April 1987)
15. "Frogs" (24 April 1987)
16. "Co-Operation" (1 May 1987)
17. "Keeping Fit" (8 May 1987)
18. "Guess Who I Am" (15 May 1987)
19. "Watch Out" (22 May 1987)
20. "Chatterbox" (29 May 1987)
21. "Smile Please" (5 June 1987)
22. "Town Living" (19 June 1987)
23. "Country Living" (26 June 1987)
24. "Car Boot Sale" (3 July 1987)
25. "Mail Order" (10 July 1987)
26. "Ugly Duckling" (17 July 1987)
27. "Words" (24 July 1987)
28. "Do It Yourself" (31 July 1987)
29. "Hare and Tortoise" (7 August 1987)
30. "Numbers" (14 August 1987)
31. "Shipwreck" (21 August 1987)
32. "Gadgets" (28 August 1987)
33. "Finding Out" (4 September 1987)
34. "Borrowing" (11 September 1987)
35. "Floating and Sinking" (18 September 1987)
36. "Monster Makes" (25 September 1987)
37. "Sensitivity" (2 October 1987)
38. "Describing" (9 October 1987)
39. "Help" (16 October 1987)
40. "Wind" (23 October 1987)
41. "Moving House" (30 October 1987)
42. "Animal Houses" (6 November 1987)
43. "New Friends" (13 November 1987)
44. "Small World 2" (20 November 1987)
45. "Bits and Pieces" (27 November 1987)
46. "Rumpelstiltskin" (4 December 1987)
47. "Souvenirs in the Loft" (11 December 1987)
48. "Decorations" (18 December 1987)
49. "Christmas Pantomime" (25 December 1987)

== Series 17 (1988–1989) ==
1. "Noah's Ark" (5 January 1988)
2. "Water" (12 January 1988)
3. "Counting On" (19 January 1988)
4. "Counting Back" (26 January 1988)
5. "Sharing Out" (2 February 1988)
6. "Social Behaviour: Self" (9 February 1988)
7. "Social Behaviour: Others" (16 February 1988)
8. "Social Behaviour: Group" (23 February 1988)
9. "Music A" (1 March 1988)
10. "Music B" (8 March 1988)
11. "Music C" (22 March 1988)
12. "Learning About Ourselves: Physical Differences" (29 March 1988)
13. "Emotions" (5 April 1988)
14. "Learning About Ourselves: Interaction" (12 April 1988)
15. "Wide and Narrow" (19 April 1988)
16. "Large and Small" (26 April 1988)
17. "Mazes Tracks and Trails" (3 May 1988)
18. "Whispers" (10 May 1988)
19. "Sounds the Same" (17 May 1988)
20. "Rhyming Words" (24 May 1988)
21. "Language of Position" (31 May 1988)
22. "Problem Solving: Mystery" (7 June 1988)
23. "Looking at Things" (14 June 1988)
24. "Pre-Reading Skills: Auditory" (21 June 1988)
25. "Pre-Reading Skills: Sequencing" (28 June 1988)
26. "Pliable" (5 July 1988)
27. "Music and Song" (12 July 1988)
28. "More/Less/Enough" (19 July 1988)
29. "Zippy's In Love" (26 July 1988)
30. "Lions and Tigers" (2 August 1988)
31. "All Change" (16 August 1988)
32. "Wibbly Wobbly" (23 August 1988)
33. "Problem Solving: Alone" (6 September 1988)
34. "Up/Down/Across" (13 September 1988)
35. "What's Going On" (20 September 1988)
36. "Nature Care" (4 October 1988)
37. "Upside Down, Inside Out" (11 October 1988)
38. "Shapes" (18 October 1988)
39. "Problem Solving: Together" (25 October 1988)
40. "Exclamation Sounds" (1 November 1988)
41. "Fast and Slow" (8 November 1988)
42. "Apes" (15 November 1988)
43. "Practical Joking" (22 November 1988)
44. "Generosity" (29 November 1988)
45. "Outer Space" (6 December 1988)
46. "Just One of Those Days" (13 December 1988)
47. "Ice and Snow: Explorers" (20 December 1988)
48. "Non-Pliable" (6 January 1989)
49. "Greed" (13 January 1989)
50. "Problem Solving: Mystery 2" (20 January 1989)
51. "Sympathy: Zippy's Got the Measles" (27 January 1989)

== Series 18 (1989–1990) ==
1. "Family Get Together" (8 September 1989)
2. "Bungling Bungle" (15 September 1989)
3. "Rejected/Neglected" (22 September 1989)
4. "Family in the Garden" (29 September 1989)
5. "Geoffrey Babysits" (6 October 1989)
6. "Neighbours" (13 October 1989)
7. "Misbehaving" (20 October 1989)
8. "Zipman and Bobbin" (27 October 1989)
9. "Zippy Wants to be a Comedian" (3 November 1989)
10. "Worried/Weary" (10 November 1989)
11. "Our Common Land" (17 November 1989)
12. "Time/Space" (24 November 1989)
13. "Night Out" (1 December 1989)
14. "Borrowing 2" (8 December 1989)
15. "Same/Different" (15 December 1989)
16. "The Toymaker" (22 December 1989)
17. "Super Bungle" (12 January 1990)
18. "George and Germs" (19 January 1990)
19. "Geoffrey Learns French" (26 January 1990)
20. "Family Pressure" (2 February 1990)
21. "Practice Makes Perfect" (9 February 1990)
22. "The VIP" (16 February 1990)
23. "Wrong Day" (23 February 1990)
24. "No Accounting for George" (2 March 1990)

== Series 19 (1990–1991) ==
1. "Planting Seeds" (31 August 1990)
2. "Friends" (7 September 1990)
3. "The Wall" (14 September 1990)
4. "Keeping Tidy" (21 September 1990)
5. "Changes" (28 September 1990)
6. "Things Aren't Always What They Seem" (5 October 1990)
7. "How Does Your Garden Grow" (12 October 1990)
8. "Streets" (19 October 1990)
9. "Kitchen Art" (26 October 1990)
10. "Sports Day 2" (2 November 1990)
11. "Safari Park" (9 November 1990)
12. "Shops" (16 November 1990)
13. "Going Places" (23 November 1990)
14. "Why Did You Do That?" (30 November 1990)
15. "Time" (7 December 1990)
16. "New for Old" (14 December 1990)
17. "Chitter Chatter" (21 December 1990)
18. "A Lazy Day" (11 January 1991)
19. "Exercise is Fun" (25 January 1991)
20. "Playing the Game" (1 February 1991)
21. "Who Done It" (8 February 1991)
22. "Rain and Water" (22 February 1991)
23. "The Birthday Cake" (1 March 1991)
24. "Shaping Up" (8 March 1991)

== Series 20 (1991–1992) ==
1. "A Trip to Spain" (13 September 1991)
2. "Something to Care For" (20 September 1991)
3. "Getting in a Muddle" (27 September 1991)
4. "The Seaside Show" (4 October 1991)
5. "Without a Voice" (11 October 1991)
6. "Geoffrey's Big Occasion" (18 October 1991)
7. "I'm the King of the Castle" (25 October 1991)
8. "Naughty Zippy" (1 November 1991)
9. "Safety First" (8 November 1991)
10. "Surprise Surprise" (15 November 1991)
11. "Sing Song" (22 November 1991)
12. "Zippy Sets Them Up" (29 November 1991)
13. "Taking Turns" (6 December 1991)
14. "Snow" (13 December 1991)
15. "Treasure Hunt" (20 December 1991)
16. "The Zippybread Man" (10 January 1992)
17. "Auntie Pays a Visit" (17 January 1992)
18. "Ice and Water" (24 January 1992)
19. "Getting Organised" (31 January 1992)
20. "The Invitation" (7 February 1992)
21. "Back Tracking" (14 February 1992)
22. "Noise" (21 February 1992)
23. "Let's Play a Game" (28 February 1992)
24. "If Only We Hadn't" (6 March 1992)

== Tetra Films series ==
=== Series 22 (1994) ===
1. "New Friends" (10 January 1994)
2. "The Customer's Always Right" (11 January 1994)
3. "Bungle's Blues" (17 January 1994)
4. "All Together Now" (18 January 1994)
5. "Zippy Learns his Lesson" (24 January 1994)
6. "What Goes Up Must Come Down" (25 January 1994)
7. "Abra-Cadabra!" (31 January 1994)
8. "Breakfast at Rainbow's" (1 February 1994)
9. "Where Did You Get That Hat?" (7 February 1994)
10. "Big, Bigger, Biggest" (8 February 1994)
11. "Sugar and Spice" (14 February 1994)
12. "Sneezes and Wheezes" (15 February 1994)
13. "Ping-Pong Perils" (21 February 1994)
14. "Bungle's Birthday" (22 February 1994)
15. "A Small Cat..Astrophe" (28 February 1994)
16. "The Clock Struck One" (1 March 1994)
17. "The Animals Went in Two by Two" (7 March 1994)
18. "Three Green Bottles" (8 March 1994)
19. "The Wheels on the Bus" (14 March 1994)
20. "Once I Caught a Fish Alive" (15 March 1994)

=== Series 23 (1995) ===
1. "Hot, Hot, Hot" (13 February 1995)
2. "Windy Weather" (20 February 1995)
3. "Sunshine and Showers" (27 February 1995)
4. "C-C-Cold" (6 March 1995)
5. "A Splash of Colour" (13 March 1995)
6. "A Fright in the Night" (20 March 1995)
7. "Green Means Go" (27 March 1995)
8. "Pinkie" (3 April 1995)
9. "Atishoo, Atishoo" (10 April 1995)
10. "Treasure Hunt" (24 April 1995)
11. "Little Pig, Little Pig, Let Me In" (1 May 1995)
12. "The Monster Trap" (15 May 1995)
13. "Captain Skyrocket" (22 May 1995)

=== Series 24 (1996) ===
1. "Rhyming" (8 January 1996)
2. "Best Friends Day" (10 January 1996)
