= Roger Walker (actor) =

British actor (born 1944)

Roger Walker (born 22 December 1944 in Bristol, England) is an English actor.

He moved to Derby at an early age and was a drama teacher at Tupton Hall School in Derbyshire in the early 1970s. His first television appearance was as a replacement for Matthew Corbett as a singer on the popular children's television show, “Rainbow”, in 1976. He appeared on the show for four years, before being replaced by Freddy Marks in 1980.

He had many television roles during the 1980s and early 1990s, including Terry and June, Big Deal, Emmerdale Farm, Bodger and Badger and The Darling Buds of May.

He played the role of Bunny Charlson in the soap opera Eldorado in 1992. Since then, he has guest-starred in long-running series such as Casualty, Peak Practice, The Queen's Nose, The Bill and Heartbeat. He also played Bill Parrish in EastEnders in 2002.

His theatre credits include work with the RSC and the Peter Hall Company. He has toured extensively and made numerous appearances in the West End.
