= List of Sooty Show episodes =

This article is a list of episodes for long-running children's television series The Sooty Show.

== The Sooty Show (**Harry Corbett Years**) ==
=== BBC Era: 1955–1967 ===
==== Series 1 (1955-1956) ====
Series titled Sooty until 1967.

No. overall	No. in series	Title	Original release date
1	1	"Episode 1"	16 January 1955
2	2	"Episode 2"	30 January 1955
3	3	"Episode 3"	13 February 1955
4	4	"Episode 4"	27 February 1955
5	5	"Episode 5"	13 March 1955
6	6	"Episode 6"	27 March 1955
7	7	"Episode 7"	17 April 1955
8	8	"Episode 8"	1 May 1955
9	9	"Episode 9"	29 May 1955
10	10	"Episode 10"	12 June 1955
11	11	"Episode 11"	26 June 1955
12	12	"Sooty's Magic Shop"	17 July 1955
13	13	"Sooty's Television Adventure"	24 July 1955
14	14	"Sooty by the Sea"	7 August 1955
15	15	"Sooty's Busy Day"	21 August 1955
16	16	"Sooty to the Rescue"	4 September 1955
17	17	"Episode 17"	18 September 1955
18	18	"Sooty's Organ"	3 October 1955
19	19	"Sooty at School"	16 October 1955
20	20	"Sooty's Sweet Shop"	30 October 1955
21	21	"Sooty's Christmas Pudding"	6 November 1955
22	22	"Sooty, Be Good"	13 November 1955
23	23	"Super Musician"	27 November 1955
24	24	"Sooty's Garage"	11 December 1955
25	25	"Sooty's Pantomime"	18 December 1955
26	26	"Episode 26"	8 January 1956
27	27	"Sooty's Chip Shop"	22 January 1956
28	28	"Sooty the Fortune Teller"	5 February 1956
29	29	"Episode 29"	19 February 1956
30	30	"Sooty's All Star Variety"	4 March 1956
31	31	"The Sooty Engineering Co?"	18 March 1956
32	32	"The Sooty Engineering Co"	1 April 1956
33	33	"Sooty at the Potters Wheel"	15 April 1956
34	34	"Sooty the Waiter"	29 April 1956
35	35	"Sooty the Champ"	13 May 1956
36	36	"Sherlock Sooty"	27 May 1956
37	37	"Sooty's Paint Shop"	10 June 1956
38	38	"Sooty by the Sea"	24 June 1956

==== Series 2 (1956-1957) ====
No. overall	No. in series	Title	Original release date
39	1	"Episode 1"	7 October 1956
40	2	"Sooty the Scout"	21 October 1956
41	3	"Sooty's Space Suit"	4 November 1956
42	4	"Sooty the Super Musician"	2 December 1956
43	5	"Sooty's Engineering Co. Ltd"	16 December 1956
44	6	"Sootyson Crusoe"	23 December 1956
45	7	"Sooty's Television Shop"	6 January 1957
46	8	"Teatime with Sooty"	20 January 1957
47	9	"Sooty the Photographer"	3 February 1957
48	10	"Episode 10"	17 February 1957
49	11	"Sooty's Garage"	3 March 1957
50	12	"Sooty and Sweep - Pork Butchers"	17 March 1957
51	13	"The Great Sooty"	31 March 1957
52	14	"Sooty the Cobbler"	14 April 1957
53	15	"Episode 15"	21 April 1957
54	16	"Episode 16"	5 May 1957
55	17	"Episode 17"	19 May 1957
56	18	"Episode 18"	2 June 1957
57	19	"Episode 19"	16 June 1957
58	20	"Episode 20"	30 June 1957

==== Series 3 (1957-1958) ====
No. overall	No. in series	Title	Original release date
59	1	"Episode 1"	29 September 1957
60	2	"Episode 2"	13 October 1957
61	3	"Episode 3"	27 October 1957
62	4	"Episode 4"	10 November 1957
63	5	"Episode 5"	24 November 1957
64	6	"Episode 6"	8 December 1957
65	7	"Sooty's Christmas Dream"	22 December 1957
66	8	"Episode 8"	5 January 1958
67	9	"Episode 9"	19 January 1958
68	10	"Episode 10"	2 February 1958
69	11	"Episode 11"	16 February 1958
70	12	"Episode 12"	2 March 1958
71	13	"Episode 13"	16 March 1958
72	14	"Episode 14"	30 March 1958
73	15	"Sooty's Chemist Shop"	13 April 1958
74	16	"Episode 16"	27 April 1958
75	17	"Sooty's Car"	11 May 1958
76	18	"Episode 18"	25 May 1958
77	19	"Episode 19"	8 June 1958
78	20	"Episode 20"	22 June 1958
79	21	"Episode 21"	6 July 1958

==== Series 4 (1958-1959) ====
No. overall	No. in series	Title	Original release date
80	1	"Episode 1"	12 October 1958
81	2	"Episode 2"	26 October 1958
82	3	"Episode 3"	9 November 1958
83	4	"Episode 4"	23 November 1958
84	5	"Episode 5"	7 December 1958
85	6	"Episode 6"	21 December 1958
86	7	"Episode 7"	4 January 1959
87	8	"Sooty's on Cruise"	18 January 1959
88	9	"Episode 9"	1 February 1959
89	10	"Episode 10"	15 February 1959
90	11	"Episode 11"	1 March 1959
91	12	"Episode 12"	15 March 1959
92	13	"Episode 13"	5 April 1959
93	14	"Episode 14"	12 April 1959
94	15	"Sooty's Pottery"	26 April 1959
95	16	"Sooty's Safari part 1: Jungle Danger"	24 May 1959
96	17	"Sooty's Safari part 2: The Cliff"	31 May 1959
97	18	"Sooty's Safari part 3: The Wild Man"	7 June 1959
98	19	"Episode 19"	21 June 1959

==== Series 5 (1959-1960) ====
No. overall	No. in series	Title	Original release date
99	1	"Episode 1"	11 October 1959
100	2	"Sooty's Shop"	25 October 1959
101	3	"Episode 3"	8 November 1959
102	4	"Episode 4"	22 November 1959
103	5	"Sooty's Theatre"	6 December 1959
104	6	"Christmas Shopping"	20 December 1959
105	7	"Episode 7"	3 January 1960
106	8	"Episode 8"	17 January 1960
107	9	"Episode 9"	31 January 1960
108	10	"Episode 10"	14 February 1960
109	11	"Episode 11"	28 February 1960
110	12	"Episode 12"	13 March 1960
111	13	"Sooty & Sweep Cobblers"	27 March 1960
112	14	"Episode 14"	10 April 1960
113	15	"Episode 15"	24 April 1960
114	16	"Episode 16"	8 May 1960
115	17	"Episode 17"	22 May 1960
116	18	"Episode 18"	5 June 1960
117	19	"Sooty the Fireman"	19 June 1960

==== Series 6 (1960-1961) ====
No. overall	No. in series	Title	Original release date
118	1	"Back to School"	9 October 1960
119	2	"A Music Lesson"	23 October 1960
120	3	"An Expresso Bar"	6 November 1960
121	4	"Their Latest Theatre Show"	20 November 1960
122	5	"Christmas Pud"	4 December 1960
123	6	"Sooty's Post Office"	18 December 1960
124	7	"Christmas Party"	27 December 1960
125	8	"Episode 8"	8 January 1961
126	9	"Episode 9"	22 January 1961
127	10	"Episode 10"	5 February 1961
128	11	"Episode 11"	19 February 1961
129	12	"Episode 12"	5 March 1961
130	13	"Episode 13"	19 March 1961
131	14	"The Sooty Dance Orchestra"	3 April 1961
132	15	"Episode 15"	16 April 1961
133	16	"Episode 16"	30 April 1961
134	17	"Episode 17"	14 May 1961
135	18	"A Music Lesson rpt"	28 May 1961
136	19	"Episode 19"	11 June 1961
137	20	"Episode 20"	25 June 1961

==== Series 7 (1961-1962) ====
No. overall	No. in series	Title	Original release date
138	1	"Holiday Flicks"	1 October 1961
139	2	"In the Kitchen"	15 October 1961
140	3	"Musk with a Difference"	29 October 1961
141	4	"Sooty's Christmas Pantomime"	17 December 1961
142	5	"Sooty's Circus"	27 December 1961
143	6	"Sooty the Waiter"	7 January 1962
144	7	"Sooty's on Cruise"	14 January 1962
145	8	"Sooty the Super Musician"	21 January 1962
146	9	"Bedtime with Sooty"	28 January 1962
147	10	"The Pet Show"	11 February 1962
148	11	"Sooty's Sweet Shop"	25 February 1962
149	12	"Sooty Takes Off"	11 March 1962
150	13	"Sooty's Marionette Show"	25 March 1962
151	14	"The Birthday Party"	8 April 1962
152	15	"Sooty's Easter Eggs"	22 April 1962
153	16	"Episode 16"	6 May 1962

==== Series 8 (1962) ====
Series now on weekly.

No. overall	No. in series	Title	Original release date
154	1	"Sooty's Caravan"	30 September 1962
155	2	"The Adventures of Bessie Part 1"	7 October 1962
156	3	"The Adventures of Bessie Part 2"	14 October 1962
157	4	"Sooty's Road Excavations"	21 October 1962
158	5	"Sooty's Butcher Shop"	28 October 1962
159	6	"Take it Easy"	4 November 1962
160	7	"The Punch and Sooty Show"	11 November 1962
161	8	"Teatime with Sooty"	29 November 1962
162	9	"Sooty's Clock Shop"	13 December 1962
163	10	"Sweep's Christmas Adventure"	27 December 1962

==== Series 9 (1963-1964) ====
No. overall	No. in series	Title	Original release date
164	1	"Sweet Dreams"	14 July 1963
165	2	"Sooty's Toy Shop"	21 July 1963
166	3	"Inferior Decorators"	28 July 1963
167	4	"Sooty's Busy Day"	5 August 1963
168	5	"The Great Corbett"	11 August 1963
169	6	"Sooty's Dry-Cleaning Company"	18 August 1963
170	7	"What a Jam"	25 August 1963
171	8	"Sooty the Hairdresser"	1 September 1963
172	9	"Sooty's Toy Factory"	8 September 1963
173	10	"Magic in the Air"	15 September 1963
174	11	"Sooty's Television Shop"	22 September 1963
175	12	"Sooty the Super Musician"	29 September 1963
176	13	"The Sooty Fisheries"	6 October 1963
177	14	"Sooty's Theatre"	13 October 1963
178	15	"Sweep Takes a Bath"	20 October 1963
179	16	"Sooty the Chemist"	27 October 1963
180	17	"Sooty's Christmas Party"	25 December 1963
181	18	"Super Musicians"	29 December 1963
182	19	"Pottering Around"	5 January 1964
183	20	"Sooty the Cobbler"	12 January 1964
184	21	"Sooty's Pet Shop"	19 January 1964

==== Series 10 (1964) ====
No. overall	No. in series	Title	Original release date
185	1	"Sweet Dreams"	16 August 1964
186	2	"Sooty and Sweep in the Garden"	23 August 1964
187	3	"Old Time Music Hall"	30 August 1964
188	4	"Car Capers"	6 September 1964
189	5	"Music with a Difference"	13 September 1964
190	6	"'Green' Grocers"	20 September 1964

==== Series 11 (1965) ====
No. overall	No. in series	Title	Original release date
191	1	"Doctor Sooty"	24 January 1965
192	2	"Good Morning Boys"	31 January 1965
193	3	"Sooty's Solo"	7 February 1965
194	4	"Sooty's Fisheries"	14 February 1965
195	5	"Sooty's Grand Bazaar"	21 February 1965
196	6	"The Case of the Missing Bones"	28 February 1965
197	7	"Box of Tricks"	7 March 1965
198	8	"Sootbox Jury"	14 March 1965
199	9	"Send for Sooty"	21 March 1965

==== Series 12 (1965-1966) ====
No. overall	No. in series	Title	Original release date
200	1	"Sooty at School"	3 October 1965
201	2	"Picnic Time"	10 October 1965
202	3	"Quiztime"	17 October 1965
203	4	"Audition Time"	24 October 1965
204	5	"Teatime with Sooty"	31 October 1965
205	6	"Sooty's Music Shop"	7 November 1965
206	7	"Introducing 'Enery"	14 November 1965
207	8	"Sooty's Restaurant"	21 November 1965
208	9	"Post Early"	28 November 1965
209	10	"Space Dreams"	5 December 1965
210	11	"Sooty's Panto Rehearsal"	12 December 1965
211	12	"Christmas Shopping"	19 December 1965
212	13	"Here we come a-wassailing"	26 December 1965
213	14	"Fire"	2 January 1966
214	15	"Sooty Looks Back"	9 January 1966

==== Series 13 (1966-1967) ====
No. overall	No. in series	Title	Original release date
215	1	"Sooty's Mammoth Circus"	9 October 1966
216	2	"Sooty's Clock Shop"	16 October 1966
217	3	"Get Moving"	23 October 1966
218	4	"Sooty the Dentist"	30 October 1966
219	5	"The Baby Sitters"	6 November 1966
220	6	"The Theatrical Agents"	13 November 1966
221	7	"Sooty the Ironmonger"	20 November 1966
222	8	"The House that Sooty Built"	27 November 1966
223	9	"The Haunted House"	4 December 1966
224	10	"Sweep's Heap"	11 December 1966
225	11	"Sooty's Christmas Dream"	18 December 1966
226	12	"Sooty's Christmas Show"	26 December 1966
227	13	"Barnacle Sooty the Sailor"	1 January 1967

==== Series 14 (1967) ====
Series now being renamed The Sooty Show.

No. overall	No. in series	Title	Original release date
228	1	"The Great Sausage Scandal"	10 September 1967
229	2	"Dirty Work at the Cleaners"	17 September 1967
230	3	"Trouble Bruin"	24 September 1967
231	4	"A Store of Trouble"	1 October 1967
232	5	"Corbetts Cottage"	8 October 1967
233	6	"Curtains Up"	15 October 1967
234	7	"Caravan Capers"	22 October 1967
235	8	"Growing Pains"	29 October 1967
236	9	"Holiday Flicks"	5 November 1967
237	10	"The Ickle Ockle Manufacturing Company"	12 November 1967
238	11	"The Winged Wonder part 1"	19 November 1967
239	12	"The Winged Wonder part 2"	3 December 1967
240	13	"The MacCorbett Millions part 1"	10 December 1967
241	14	"The MacCorbett Millions part 2"	17 December 1967
242	15	"The Carol Singers"	24 December 1967
243	16	"Christmas Shopping"	25 December 1967
This was the final BBC episode of Sooty

=== Thames ITV Era: 1968–1981 ===
==== Series 1 (1968) ====
All episodes for this series and the next four feature hostess Bonita Shaw, who later married dancer, choreographer, producer and music TV judge Nigel Lythgoe.

No. overall	No. in series	Title	Guests	Original release date
1	1	"Episode 1"	Gerry Marsden	30 July 1968
This is the first episode of The Sooty Show on ITV (and Thames Television, which began broadcasting the same day)
2	2	"Episode 2"	Robert Harbin	6 August 1968
3	3	"Episode 3"	Peter Butterworth	13 August 1968
4	4	"Episode 4"	Desmond King	20 August 1968
5	5	"Episode 5"	Poz	27 August 1968
6	6	"Episode 6"	Gerry Marsden	3 September 1968
7	7	"Episode 7"	Peter Butterworth	10 September 1968
8	8	"Episode 8"	Desmond King	17 September 1968
9	9	"Episode 9"	Wally Whyton	24 September 1968
10	10	"Episode 10"	Corbett, Corbett and Popplewell	1 October 1968
Corbett, Corbett and Popplewell were a three piece pop group with members, Matthew Corbett (then known by real name Peter), brother Dave and friend Perry Popplewell.
11	11	"Episode 11"	Poz	8 October 1968
12	12	"Episode 12"	Wally Whyton	15 October 1968
13	13	"Episode 13"	George Chisholm	22 October 1968
14	14	"Episode 14"	Joan Savage	29 October 1968
15	15	"Episode 15"	Clinton Ford	5 November 1968
16	16	"Episode 16"	Pippy the Telephant	12 November 1968
17	17	"Episode 17"	Kenny Lynch	19 November 1968
18	18	"Episode 18"	Vince Hill	26 November 1968
19	19	"Episode 19"	Wally Whyton	3 December 1968
20	20	"Episode 20"	George Chisholm	10 December 1968
21	21	"Episode 21"	TBA	17 December 1968
22	22	"Christmas Show"	TBA	24 December 1968
23	23	"New Year Show"	TBA	31 December 1968

==== Series 2 (1969) ====
No. overall	No. in series	Title	Guests	Original release date
24	1	"Episode 1"	Cliff Richard	6 August 1969
25	2	"Episode 2"	Roy Hudd	13 August 1969
26	3	"Episode 3"	Hank Marvin	20 August 1969
27	4	"Episode 4"	Billy Dainty	27 August 1969
28	5	"Episode 5"	Denise Coffey	3 September 1969
29	6	"Episode 6"	Clinton Ford	10 September 1969
30	7	"Episode 7"	Frank Paulo and Mickey the Monkey	17 September 1969
31	8	"Episode 8"	Wally Whyton	24 September 1969
32	9	"Episode 9"	Lionel Blair	1 October 1969
33	10	"Episode 10"	Cliff Richard	8 October 1969
34	11	"Episode 11"	Billy Dainty	15 October 1969
35	12	"Episode 12"	Poz	22 October 1969
36	13	"Episode 13"	Roy Hudd	29 October 1969
37	14	"Christmas Special"	TBA	23 December 1969
First episode in colour?

==== Series 3 (1970) ====
No. overall	No. in series	Title	Guests	Original release date
38	1	"Episode 1"	Arthur Askey	27 April 1970
39	2	"Episode 2"	Gerry Marsden	5 May 1970
40	3	"Episode 3"	Eric Delaney	12 May 1970
41	4	"Episode 4"	The Skating Meteors	19 May 1970
42	5	"Episode 5"	Roy Hudd and Michael Harvey	26 May 1970
43	6	"Episode 6"	Arthur Mullard	1 June 1970
44	7	"Episode 7"	Peter Butterworth	8 June 1970
45	8	"Episode 8"	Larry Parker	15 June 1970
46	9	"Episode 9"	Arthur Askey	22 June 1970
47	10	"Episode 10"	Sandy Powell	29 June 1970
48	11	"Episode 11"	Janet Brown	6 July 1970
49	12	"Episode 12"	Roy Hudd and Michael Harvey	13 July 1970
50	13	"Episode 13"	Matthew Corbett	20 July 1970
51	14	"Episode 14"	TBA	27 July 1970

==== Series 4 (1970) ====
No. overall	No. in series	Title	Guests	Original release date
52	1	"Episode 1"	TBA	4 September 1970
53	2	"Episode 2"	TBA	11 September 1970
54	3	"Episode 3"	TBA	18 September 1970
55	4	"Episode 4"	TBA	25 September 1970
56	5	"Episode 5"	TBA	2 October 1970
57	6	"Episode 6"	TBA	9 October 1970
58	7	"Episode 7"	TBA	16 October 1970
59	8	"Episode 8"	TBA	23 October 1970
60	9	"Episode 9"	TBA	30 October 1970
61	10	"Episode 10"	TBA	6 November 1970
62	11	"Episode 11"	TBA	13 November 1970
63	12	"Episode 12"	TBA	20 November 1970
64	13	"Episode 13"	TBA	27 November 1970
65	14	"Episode 14"	TBA	4 December 1970
66	15	"Episode 15"	TBA	11 December 1970
67	16	"Episode 16"	TBA	18 December 1970
68	17	"Christmas Special 1 1970"	TBA	24 December 1970
69	18	"Christmas Special 2 1970"	TBA	25 December 1970

==== Series 5 (1971) ====
No. overall	No. in series	Title	Guests	Original release date
70	1	"Episode 1"	Mike and Bernie Winters	6 January 1971
71	2	"Episode 2"	Jack Beckitt	13 January 1971
72	3	"Episode 3"	Ali Bongo	20 January 1971
73	4	"Episode 4"	Lionel Blair	27 January 1971
74	5	"Episode 5"	Ron Martin	3 February 1971
75	6	"Episode 6"	Larry Parker	10 February 1971
76	7	"Episode 7"	Gerry Marsden	17 February 1971
77	8	"Episode 8"	Jack Tripp	24 February 1971
78	9	"Episode 9"	Matthew Corbett	3 March 1971
79	10	"Episode 10"	Mrs Mills	10 March 1971
80	11	"Episode 11"	Davy Kaye	17 March 1971
81	12	"Episode 12"	Alan Randall	24 March 1971
82	13	"Episode 13"	Mike and Bernie Winters	31 March 1971

==== Series 6 (1971) ====
No. overall	No. in series	Title	Guests	Original release date
83	1	"Episode 1"	Roy Hudd	14 July 1971
84	2	"Episode 2"	Gerry Marsden	21 July 1971
85	3	"Episode 3"	Ken Joy	28 July 1971
86	4	"Episode 4"	Peter Glaze	4 August 1971
87	5	"Episode 5"	Ali Bongo	11 August 1971
88	6	"Episode 6"	Arthur Askey	18 August 1971
89	7	"Episode 7"	The Monarchs	25 August 1971
90	8	"Episode 8"	Matthew Corbett	1 September 1971
91	9	"Episode 9"	Roy Hudd	8 September 1971
92	10	"Episode 10"	Wally Whyton	15 September 1971
93	11	"Episode 11"	Peter Butterworth	22 September 1971
94	12	"Episode 12"	Clifford Henry	29 September 1971
95	13	"Episode 13"	Arthur Askey	6 October 1971

==== Series 7 (1972) ====
No. overall	No. in series	Title	Guests	Original release date
96	1	"Episode 1"	Jimmy Jewel	4 January 1972
97	2	"Episode 2"	Nigel Pegram	11 January 1972
98	3	"Episode 3"	Larry Parker	18 January 1972
99	4	"Episode 4"	Matthew Corbett	25 January 1972
100	5	"Episode 5"	Roger Floss	1 February 1972
101	6	"Episode 6"	Ivor Emmanuel	8 February 1972
102	7	"Episode 7"	George Chisholm	15 February 1972
103	8	"Episode 8"	Billy Glass	22 February 1972
104	9	"Episode 9"	Gerry Marsden	29 February 1972
105	10	"Episode 10"	Janet Brown	7 March 1972
106	11	"Episode 11"	Ali Bongo	14 March 1972

==== Series 8 (1972) ====
This series had Wally Whyton and Matthew Corbett on every edition

No. overall	No. in series	Title	Guests	Original release date
107	1	"Episode 1"	TBA	12 September 1972
108	2	"Episode 2"	TBA	19 September 1972
109	3	"Episode 3"	TBA	26 September 1972
110	4	"Episode 4"	TBA	3 October 1972
111	5	"Episode 5"	TBA	10 October 1972
112	6	"Episode 6"	Percy Press	17 October 1972
113	7	"Episode 7"	TBA	24 October 1972
114	8	"Episode 8"	TBA	31 October 1972
115	9	"Episode 9"	TBA	7 November 1972
116	10	"Episode 10"	TBA	14 November 1972
117	11	"Episode 11"	TBA	21 November 1972
118	12	"Episode 12"	TBA	28 November 1972
119	13	"Episode 13"	TBA	5 December 1972

==== Series 9 (1973) ====
Gerry Marsden and Matthew Corbett appear in every edition

No. overall	No. in series	Title	Guests	Original release date
120	1	"Episode 1"	TBA	11 April 1973
121	2	"Episode 2"	TBA	18 April 1973
122	3	"Episode 3"	TBA	25 April 1973
123	4	"Episode 4"	TBA	2 May 1973
124	5	"Episode 5"	TBA	9 May 1973
125	6	"Episode 6"	TBA	16 May 1973
126	7	"Episode 7"	TBA	23 May 1973
127	8	"Episode 8"	TBA	30 May 1973
128	9	"Episode 9"	TBA	6 June 1973
129	10	"Episode 10"	TBA	13 June 1973
130	11	"Episode 11"	TBA	20 June 1973
131	12	"Episode 12"	TBA	27 June 1973
132	13	"Episode 13"	TBA	4 July 1973

==== Series 10 (1973) ====
No. overall	No. in series	Title	Guests	Original release date
133	1	"Episode 1"	Roy Hudd	25 September 1973
134	2	"Episode 2"	Johnny Hackett	2 October 1973
135	3	"Episode 3"	Eric Delaney	9 October 1973
136	4	"Episode 4"	Jack Douglas	16 October 1973
137	5	"Episode 5"	Ali Bongo	23 October 1973
138	6	"Episode 6"	The Carrot Crunchers	30 October 1973
139	7	"Episode 7"	Wally Whyton	6 November 1973
140	8	"Episode 8"	George Chisholm	13 November 1973
141	9	"Episode 9"	Matthew Corbett	20 November 1973
142	10	"Episode 10"	Matthew Corbett	27 November 1973
143	11	"Episode 11"	Alan Shaxon	4 December 1973
144	12	"Episode 12"	Matthew Corbett and Gerry Marsden	11 December 1973
145	13	"Episode 13"	Jack Douglas	18 December 1973

==== Series 11 (1974) ====
Matthew Corbett from this series onwards appears on the show more regularly

No. overall	No. in series	Title	Guests	Original release date
146	1	"Episode 1"	Freddie Davies	6 March 1974
147	2	"Episode 2"	Deryck Guyler	13 March 1974
148	3	"Episode 3"	Gerry Marsden	20 March 1974
149	4	"Episode 4"	Wally Whyton	27 March 1974
150	5	"Episode 5"	Freddie Davies	3 April 1974
151	6	"Episode 6"	Gerry Marsden	10 April 1974
152	7	"Episode 7"	Poz	17 April 1974
153	8	"Episode 8"	Roy Hudd	24 April 1974
154	9	"Episode 9"	Gerry Marsden	1 May 1974
155	10	"Episode 10"	Gerry Marsden	8 May 1974
156	11	"Episode 11"	Peter Butterworth	15 May 1974
157	12	"Episode 12"	Gerry Marsden	22 May 1974
158	13	"Episode 13"	Gerry Marsden	29 May 1974

==== Series 12 (1974-1975) ====
No. overall	No. in series	Title	Guests	Original release date
159	1	"Christmas Special"	Gerry Marsden, Charmian Dore, Freddie Davies, Karl Johnson, Julian Littman	25 December 1974
160	2	"Episode 2"	Rolf Harris	31 December 1974
161	3	"Episode 3"	Gerry Marsden	7 January 1975
162	4	"Episode 4"	Freddie Davies	14 January 1975
163	5	"Episode 5"	Gerry Marsden	21 January 1975
164	6	"Episode 6"	Ed Stewart	28 January 1975
165	7	"Episode 7"	Gerry Marsden	4 February 1975
166	8	"Episode 8"	Ken Goodwin	11 February 1975
167	9	"Episode 9"	Gerry Marsden	18 February 1975
168	10	"Episode 10"	Rolf Harris	25 February 1975
169	11	"Episode 11"	Gerry Marsden	4 March 1975
170	12	"Episode 12"	Freddie Davies	11 March 1975
171	13	"Episode 13"	Gerry Marsden	18 March 1975
172	14	"Episode 14"	Ali Bongo	25 March 1975

==== Series 13 (1975) ====
No. overall	No. in series	Title	Guests	Original release date
173	1	"Episode 1"	Gerry Marsden	24 September 1975
174	2	"Episode 2"	Roy Hudd	1 October 1975
175	3	"Episode 3"	Deryck Guyler	8 October 1975
176	4	"Episode 4"	Bernard Cribbins	15 October 1975
177	5	"Episode 5"	Gerry Marsden	22 October 1975
178	6	"Episode 6"	Dora Bryan	29 October 1975
179	7	"Episode 7"	Deryck Guyler	5 November 1975
180	8	"Episode 8"	Gerry Marsden	12 November 1975
181	9	"Episode 9"	Bernard Cribbins	19 November 1975
182	10	"Episode 10"	Dora Bryan	26 November 1975
183	11	"Episode 11"	TBA	3 December 1975
184	12	"Episode 12"	Gerry Marsden	10 December 1975
185	13	"Episode 13"	TBA	17 December 1975
186	14	"Christmas Special"	Rod, Jane and Matthew and Billy Dainty	24 December 1975
This was the last episode with Harry Corbett before his heart attack during Christmas 1975. The episode was released on DVD in 2016 titled Winter Wonders Collection in a compilation with 4 episodes of Rainbow and 1988 episode Sooty's Christmas Party.

== The Sooty Show (**Matthew Corbett Years**) ==
=== Thames ITV Era: Cont'd ===
==== Series 1 (1976) ====
With Matthew now at the helm, Harry Corbett still appears in segments for the next couple of series.

No. overall	No. in series	Title	Guests	Original release date
1	1	"Episode 1"	Freddie Davies	6 October 1976
Freddie Davies was the guest on the first episode with Matthew Corbett.
2	2	"Episode 2"	Gerry Marsden with Derek Franks	13 October 1976
3	3	"Episode 3"	Rosemary Squires	20 October 1976
4	4	"Episode 4"	Gerry Marsden with Derek Franks	27 October 1976
5	5	"Episode 5"	Presto the Magic Rabbit with Mel Harvey	3 November 1976
6	6	"Episode 6"	Freddie Davies	10 November 1976
7	7	"Episode 7"	Denise Coffey	17 November 1976
8	8	"Episode 8"	Rosemary Squires	24 November 1976
9	9	"Episode 9"	Gerry Marsden with Derek Franks	1 December 1976
10	10	"Episode 10"	Ali Bongo	8 December 1976
11	11	"Episode 11"	Gerry Marsden with Derek Franks	15 December 1976
12	12	"Christmas Special"	Gerry Marsden with Derek Franks	22 December 1976
13	13	"Episode 13"	Gerry Marsden	29 December 1976

==== Series 2 (1977) ====
No. overall	No. in series	Title	Guests	Original release date
14	1	"Episode 1"	Zippy, George, Bungle and Geoffrey Hayes from Rainbow	6 September 1977
15	2	"Episode 2"	Annette Mason	13 September 1977
16	3	"Episode 3"	Ivor Wynne	20 September 1977
Sooty has opened a boutique and in the regular 'Harry Remembers' segment, Harry recalls the day Matthew gave Sooty a new magic spell book.
17	4	"Episode 4"	Ali Bongo	27 September 1977
Sweep the 'Astro-Dog' blasts off to the moon from Cape Caramel and in Harry Remembers, Harry recalls one of Sooty's inventions - Henry the Robot.
18	5	"Episode 5"	Joe Brown	4 October 1977
It's Sweep's birthday and he thinks everyone has forgot, but a surprise party is planned. Later, Sweep gets the This Is Your Life treatment and in 'Harry Remembers', he recalls when Sooty was a cowboy and he talks to Crampian the Blunder Horse.
19	6	"Episode 6"	Rod, Jane and Roger	18 October 1977
Matthew visits Sooty's butchers shop which is full of surprises, while in 'Harry Remembers', he talks about when Matthew became the local council's Hole-in-the-Road inspector.
20	7	"Episode 7"	Teddy Alexander	25 October 1977
Matthew tries to post his parcels at Sooty's Post Office, while in 'Harry Remembers', he remarks when Sooty decided to run a zoo! NOTE: This episode was originally scheduled for 11 October but postponed due to extended coverage of the Conservative Party conference.
21	8	"Episode 8"	Roy Earl	1 November 1977
Matthew should have known better than to eat Sooty's lighter-than-air fairy cakes when he's left suspended in the air! Sooty and Sweep visit storyland where they come face to face with a wicked witch, while guest Roy Earl needs some help when he tries to make cakes for his tea and in 'Harry Remembers', he talks about an ugly duckling.
22	9	"Episode 9"	Victor Burnett and June	8 November 1977
Matthew visits Sooty's chemist shop, but ends up with a headache from it! The guest is Victor Burnett with his assistant June and perform magic tricks involving fire and in 'Harry Remembers', he recalls when he chartered an aeroplane that ended up being piloted by Sooty!
23	10	"Episode 10"	Bernard Bresslaw	15 November 1977
Sooty and the gang have a go at film making, while guest Bernard Bresslaw, famous for his roles in the Carry On films, discovers Sooty and Sweep do have legs!, and in 'Harry Remembers', he remarks when Sooty and Sweep met a Koala and Matthew went on safari in the jungle.
24	11	"Episode 11"	Kovari	22 November 1977
Sooty and Sweep are looking for ways out of doing their homework, while the guest in this episode is magician and illusionist the great Kovari. In 'Harry Remembers', Harry recalls a show that featured a bird called Archie.
25	12	"Episode 12"	Freddie Davies	29 November 1977
26	13	"Episode 13"	Dale, Martin and Boobsey Dog	6 December 1977
NOTE: Last regular appearance of Harry Corbett. He makes one more in the 1984 episode Father's Day.

==== Series 3 (1978) ====
No. overall	No. in series	Title	Guests	Original release date
27	1	"Episode 1"	Larry Parker	20 September 1978
Sweep wants to become Prime Minister and hopes the use of Sooty's Invention Centre will help, but it makes Sweep's legs longer and Matthew's shorter! The guest is children's entertainer Larry Parker.
28	2	"Episode 2"	Dash's Chimpanzees	27 September 1978
Matthew holds an inventing contest, but most of the inventions don't work! Later Matthew visits the car wash, but it ends in chaos since Sooty and Sweep are in charge! The guests are Dash's Chimpanzees.
29	3	"Episode 3"	Bryan Burdon	4 October 1978
Matthew has trouble with Soo's invention at Sooty's Invention Centre, while guest Bryan Burdon has problems using his magic cabinet (mainly due to his non-co-operative assistants). Later on, Matthew has difficulties with getting Sooty, Sweep and Soo to bed.
30	4	"Episode 4"	Jon Klox	11 October 1978
Matthew isn't feeling well, so hopefully Sooty's Invention Centre will provide the tonic he needs, and guest Jon Klox performs some magic using clocks and watches, whike Matthew also tries to teach Sooty, Sweep, Soo and Butch how to play cricket!
31	5	"Episode 5"	Annette Mason	18 October 1978
Matthew's best shirt has just come back from the dry cleaners, but Sooty wants to test out the cleaning fluid he's invented on it! The guest is singer Annette Mason. Later on, Matthew finds himself having lunch with 'city gent' Sweep!
32	6	"Episode 6"	Victor Burnett and June	25 October 1978
With the help of Colin the Computer, Sooty makes some bread. Guests Victor Burnett and June perform some magic and Sooty tries his paw at plumbing unfortunately for Matthew!
33	7	"Episode 7"	Shahid Malik	1 November 1978
At the Invention Centre, Sooty is busy building a robot, while the guest is illusionist Shahid Malik (who would go on to appear 15 years later in the Sooty & Co episode 'Clocks Galore'). Later on, Matthew takes Soo's Auntie's baby out for a walk.
34	8	"Episode 8"	Wendy Holden	8 November 1978
Sooty has invented a Sweep robot which fools Matthew, but when the real Sweep appears, Matthew thinks it's the robot. Mayhem ensues when more robots appear! The guest is ventriloquist Wendy Holden and later on, Matthew visits Sooty's computerised hairdressing salon!
35	9	"Episode 9"	June Merlin	15 November 1978
Matthew travels through time using Sooty's Time and Space machine where he visits a haunted castle. The guest is June Merlin whose performance involves her magical doves.
36	10	"Episode 10"	Holly Gray	22 November 1978
37	11	"Episode 11"	Don Robertson	29 November 1978
Matthew finds himself in the Wild West at the Crazy Dog Saloon, while the guest is the European yo-yo champion Don Robertson.
38	12	"Episode 12"	Billy McComb	6 December 1978
39	13	"Episode 13"	The Looneys	13 December 1978
Sooty demonstrates his action replay dream machine. The guests are acrobats The Looneys and later on, Sooty and his friends are having their picnic in Soo's dream.

==== Series 4 (1980) ====
No. overall	No. in series	Title	Guests	Original release date
40	1	"Episode 1"	Alan Randall	6 February 1980
Sooty waves his magic wand and one by one, he makes all his friends appear. In the first part of the adventure film, 'The Case of the Black Hand', Sherlock Sooty goes in search of a master criminal (played by Bob Todd). The guest is musician Alan Randall.
41	2	"Episode 2"	Paul Fox	13 February 1980
Matthew has taken a job as a school teacher, but his attempts at teaching Sooty and the gang flower arranging are hindered by Ramsbottom who keeps eating the flowers. The guest is juggler Paul Fox and in 'The Case of the Black Hand', the porridge goes splat as Matthew finds out.
42	3	"Episode 3"	Clive Webb	20 February 1980
Colin the Computer is making badges, but when Sweep gets involved, things go wrong. The guest is magician Clive Webb and in 'The Case of the Black Hand', Sherlock Sooty wonders if the Black Hand is posing as a policeman?
43	4	"Episode 4"	Yuri and Tonya	27 February 1980
Sooty performs some magic, while later on, the gang find an antique snuff box, and in the fourth part of 'The Case of the Black Hand', clown Yuri and his assistant Tonya are the guests.
44	5	"Episode 5"	Presto the Magic Rabbit with Mel Harvey	5 March 1980
Sooty performs a trick using a magic cabinet, while later on, the gang are preparing for Sooty's Disco by choosing a song which turns into chaos. Sherlock Sooty also continues his search for 'The Black Hand' and the guest is Presto the Magic Rabbit assisted by Mel Harvey.
45	6	"Episode 6"	Dawson Chance	12 March 1980
The gang are up to their usual mischief during an art class, while the special guest is ventriloquist Dawson Chance with his sleepy tortoise Cuddles. Also featured is the sixth part of adventure film 'The Case of the Black Hand'.
46	7	"Episode 7"	Mr Crisco	19 March 1980
Sooty sets sail in his boat but unfortunately poor Sweep misses it. Later on, Sooty has to deal with an octopus. The guest is magician Mr Crisco and part seven of 'The Case of the Black Hand' is also featured.
47	8	"Episode 8"	Lenny the Lion with Terry Hall	2 April 1980
The final episode of the series takes place in Sooty's garden where he performs magic tricks with the flowers. The guest is ventriloquist Terry Hall with Lenny the Lion and also featured is the concluding part of the adventure film 'The Case of the Black Hand'. This was the final episode to feature the stage area filmed at the studio.

==== Christmas Special (1980) ====
No. overall	No. in series	Title	Guests	Original release date
48	-	"The Sooty Christmas Show with the Cap and Bells Puppet Theatre"	25 December 1980	
Sooty, Sweep and Soo decide to wake Matthew with a Christmas song, with Matthew being annoyed that they are waking him so early. It also doesn't help that they want to have their Christmas party at 6am. Matthew remembers the previous Christmas when he ended up with an exploded Christmas pudding on his face. Note: This is the first Sooty Show episode that has the new format and would now took place in the Sooteries cottage which remained in the show until its end in 1992, it could also be seen as the pilot episode of the fifth series that started airing a week later.

==== Series 5 (1981) ====
From this series onwards, all episodes were based in the Sooteries cottage, following a sitcom format.

No. overall	No. in series	Title	Original release date
49	1	"Bangcorn"	5 January 1981
Sooty, Sweep, Soo and Matthew have bangcorn for breakfast. Then Matthew tries to get rid of a mole that is digging up the lawn... but it turns out to be Sweep looking for his bone.
50	2	"Matthew's Car"	12 January 1981
Sooty and Sweep help Matthew with his red car, but it starts falling apart. So he takes his car for a drive, but it breaks down, and then it catches on fire. When the fireman comes, he rescues Matthew.
51	3	"Hot Air Balloon"	19 January 1981
Sweep keeps falling asleep so Matthew decides to send him up in a hot air balloon to keep him awake, with Sooty holding on to it with a rope. However, the rope snaps and Sweep goes flying off across the countryside! Matthew and Sooty chase the balloon in the Sootymobile!
52	4	"Music"	26 January 1981
Matthew is asleep in bed, but is suddenly woken up by loud music coming from Sooty, Sweep and Soo's bedroom. Matthew makes them turn the music off and gets back into bed. However, the peace does not last long as the gang then decide to play classical music instead, followed by dance band music!
53	5	"Picnic"	2 February 1981
Matthew is awoken as Soo is shouting at him. When he comes to see what she wants she tells him she is ill and Matthew agrees to cook her a nice breakfast. When he asks Sweep to help, Sweep says he's got the flu and would like the same as Soo. Sooty claims to have dizzy spells, which leaves Matthew to sort out the breakfast. However, Matthew discovers that the gang were only pretending to be ill to get breakfast in bed.
54	6	"Be Kind to Matthew Day!"	9 February 1981
Sooty, Sweep and Soo decide to have a 'Be Kind to Matthew Day', which begins with the gang making him breakfast in bed. Soo asks Sweep to make the tea and Sooty to make some toast, while Soo will make some porridge. However, Sweep remembers he is not allowed to use the kettle, so instead, he makes the tea with hot water from the tap and a ton of sugar! while Sooty has problems using the toaster, with the toast coming out black!
55	7	"Boxing"	16 February 1981
Sooty is outside in the garden training as he is about to take part in a boxing match against Butch, who is the current champion. Matthew explains that Sooty has been training every morning while Sweep and Soo have been asleep and assures Soo that Sooty is in great shape! Matthew has made Sooty a huge breakfast, but before he can eat it, Butch arrives boasting that he is going to easily beat Sooty. Note: Last episode featuring Marjorie Corbett as the voice of Soo.

==== Series 6 (1981) ====
No. overall	No. in series	Title	Original release date
56	1	"Bob a Job"	14 September 1981
Matthew enters Sooty, Sweep and Soo's bedroom to wake them up and notices how untidy it is! he tells them that he wants the bedroom tidied up before they come downstairs for breakfast. Sweep's idea of tidying is throwing his bones on the floor, while Soo can't decide where to put her clothes and decides to put them away later. Sooty decides to put his stuff on Sweep's bed, which Sweep later moves back. Note: First episode featuring Brenda Longman as the voice of Soo. The episode was among 5 episodes from this series given on a DVD distributed by The Times newspaper in 2008.
57	2	"Sweep Can't Sleep"	21 September 1981
Sooty and Soo are up bright and early, having had a good night's sleep, however, Sweep is still fast asleep. Soo is busy in the bathroom with different fragrances, leaving Sooty waiting for his bath. By the time Sooty and Soo are downstairs for breakfast, Sweep still isn't up! Matthew goes to get him up, but Sweep is snoring away.
58	3	"A Photo for Auntie"	28 September 1981
Matthew purchases a camera and wants to take photos of Sooty, Sweep and Soo to post to Auntie Maude. He at last captures some photos of them but Sweep then loosens the films and it is messed up. Soo says the boys can take photos of Matthew which he agrees to. Matthew, Sooty and Sweep later go to the rural area and take some pictures of Matthew. But, Matthew doesn't have a great deal of fortune as he falls off a fence and then has a problem with a bull.
59	4	"Safety First"	5 October 1981
Matthew doesn't have a very good start to the day as he trips on a toy car belonging to Sooty and Sweep. He is telling Sooty, Sweep and Soo about all the dangers in the house. But, Matthew has many accidents and ends up being run over by a bike. Note: Richard Lockwood guest stars in this episode as the Vicar on his bicycle. The episode was among 5 episodes from this series given on a DVD distributed by The Times newspaper in 2008.
60	5	"Under Canvas"	12 October 1981
Sooty, Sweep and Soo are in their bedroom, later in the kitchen and in the garage while they make their own camps. They play camps in the house and create a lot of trouble. On pretend journeys, they go on safari in Africa, find themselves on a battlefield and even imagine they are camping in a submarine. But their greatest adventure comes in a story where they are told about being under canvas on an island.
61	6	"Saving for a Holiday"	19 October 1981
Sooty, Sweep and Soo want to save money for their holiday. They save on washing powder and Matthew needs to repair some things to save money, so Sooty lends Matthew a hand and it goes badly wrong!
62	7	"Lazy Day"	26 October 1981
Matthew decides he will have a peaceful day. He wants to read his newspaper, but something keeps on occurring with the newspaper every time he attempts to read it!
63	8	"Time for Magic"	2 November 1981
Matthew, Sooty, Sweep and Soo send an invitation for the kids to come round the house to watch a magic show.
64	9	"Connie Comes to Tea"	9 November 1981
Matthew, Sooty, Sweep and Soo have a special guest coming round to visit them, so Matthew and Sooty choose to bake a cake, but Sweep puts his bone in it! Connie is the special guest and Sweep makes a banner for her but doesn't spell it right! Connie has a few accidents when she's there, but all is forgiven. Connie gives out gifts to them, Sooty gets a book, Sweep gets a bone, Soo gets a pink dress and Matthew gets flowers. Note: First episode featuring Connie Creighton. The episode was among 5 episodes from this series given on a DVD distributed by The Times newspaper in 2008.
65	10	"Sherlock Sooty"	16 November 1981
The food at Sooty's house has gone missing. Sherlock Sooty visits Matthew and blames him for pinching the food. Matthew believes it was the window cleaner pinching it, but in the end, it has been an important person sleepwalking, but who? Sweep turns out to be the culprit, it turns out he has been sleepwalking during the night. Note: Peter Jago guest stars in this episode as the window cleaner. This episode was among four episodes featured in the 1986 VHS release The Adventures of Sooty. The episode was also among 5 episodes from this series given on a DVD distributed by The Times newspaper in 2008. On the TIMES DVD, the episode is mistakenly titled as Lazy Day.
66	11	"Unusual Pets"	23 November 1981
Matthew and the gang investigate unusual pets.
67	12	"Charity Begins at Home"	30 November 1981
Chaos breaks out when Sooty, Sweep and Soo decide to launch a charity drive.
68	13	"The Sooty Christmas Show with Sooty Panto"	21 December 1981
Matthew, Sooty, Sweep and Soo are slightly upset as they can't go to a Christmas Pantomime due to terrible weather conditions, so they choose to have their own Pantomime of Little Red Riding Hood and invite all of their friends. However, Matthew keeps changing the script. Note: This episode was among four episodes featured in the 1986 VHS release The Adventures of Sooty. The episode was also among 5 episodes from this series given on a DVD distributed by The Times newspaper in 2008.

=== Thames ITV (Children's ITV) Era: 1983–1992 ===
==== 1983: Series 7 ====
(Note: these 1983 episodes were 10 minutes long and not the usual 20 mins)

"Episode 1 - Fishing"	5 January 1983
Sooty decides to go fishing to see if he can do better than Matthew and catch the biggest fish. Sweep prefers to stay at home and play with his magic fish pond. By the end of the day, Matthew wishes he had stayed at home too.
"Episode 2 - Hide and Seek"	12 January 1983
Sooty, Sweep and Soo play hide-and-seek and hide in many strange places. Matthew is not amused when they hide his breakfast and he has to seek it out. When Sweep gets lost, Soo doesn't want to play anymore, but all ends happily.
"Episode 3 - Model Maker"	19 January 1983
Sooty and his friends make models and Matthew finds it hard to chew when he discovers his breakfast is not quite what it appears to be.
"Episode 4 - Read All About It"	26 January 1983
Sooty, Sweep and Soo decide to publish their own newspaper in competition with Matthew, who they decide to interview for an article in their new daily paper. Find out what the gang does to Matthew, which makes him wish he'd never heard of the paper, Soo's News.
"Episode 5 - Fun Being Small"	2 February 1983
Sooty decides that he wants to be tall.
"Episode 6 - Inventing"	9 February 1983
Sweep sets to work on some amazing gadgets.
"Episode 7 - Classical Music"	16 February 1983
Pop music is not Matthew's cup of tea - he prefers classical. But he is not allowed to enjoy it in peace and quiet.
"Episode 8 - Fat Matt"	23 February 1983
Concerned about Matthew putting on weight, Soo, Sweep and Sooty decide to do something about it. But the diet they put him on not only reduces his weight - it stops him eating. Then when Sooty puts Matthew into his youth machine things get out of hand.
"Episode 9 - Alphonse"	13 April 1983
Sooty, Sweep and Soo want to be nice to Alphonse when he pays a visit. But when they get blamed for his nasty habits they have to think of ways of dealing with him, and Matthew lends a hand. Matthew soon realises Alphonse is not so innocent and they decide to teach him a lesson!... An interesting point to note is that Alphonse is played by Matthew Corbett's son, Ben Corbett!
"Episode 10 - Magic Box Show"	20 April 1983
Sooty puts on a magic show in his living room for some children. Similar to a 1981 episode, but in this one they load the Sootymobile with the magic tricks, but when they drive away they all fall out the back of the van. Sooty, Sweep and Soo are up early as they are preparing for the show, with Soo checking her mic, Sweep counting some coins and Sooty brushing a toy dog. Matthew shouts to them to hurry up and 'gets their skates on' which they take literally and decide to roller skate around the bathroom! NOTE: This episode was among four episodes featured in the 1986 VHS release The Adventures of Sooty.
"Episode 11 - Snuffles"	27 April 1983
A rabbit called Snuffles comes to stay with Sooty, but he eats too much. Sooty, Sweep and Soo are up early and they are playing with their toy rabbits, while Sweep is playing with his bone. Matthew comes to see what they are up to and comments that they are like rabbits, with Soo agreeing and telling Matthew she wishes he'd let them have their own pet rabbit. NOTE: This episode was among four episodes featured in the 1986 VHS release The Adventures of Sooty.
"Episode 12 - Holiday Homework"	4 May 1983
It's the last day of the school holidays and Sooty, Sweep and Soo get into a panic when Matthew discovers that they have not finished their homework or organized their uniforms. They also all need to practice the piano, so they play together.
"Episode 13 - Noise"	11 May 1983
One thing that Matthew likes above all is silence - which he rarely gets living with Sooty, Sweep and Soo. Driven mad by the noise in the house, he tries to find peace and quiet in the countryside. But, it turns out that the country isn't as quiet as he expected.

==== 1983/1984: Series 8 ====
This series had a 20 episode run, the longest series of Sooty, Matthew Corbett era ever made.

Title	Original airdate
"Episode 1 - The Dancer"	14 October 1983
A new series of adventures with Sooty and the gang. Sweep wants to become a ballet dancer and is helped with his ambition by Sooty and Soo. Matthew decides he can be as good as Sweep, but meets his downfall when his teacher turns out to be Bonnie Langford. NOTES: Guest starring Bonnie Langford This episode was among three episodes featured in the 1986 VHS release Sooty & Superdog.
"Episode 2 - The Stuntman"	21 October 1983
Sooty rides high when he, Sweep and Soo are taken to watch the Royal Artillery Motorcycle Display Team performing their acrobatics. Sooty joins in, and Matthew falls foul of the team when they use him in one of their stunts.
"Episode 3 - Under the Sun"	28 October 1983
Matthew and Sooty enjoy sunbathing and decide to make the most of the hot weather, but they soon wish the sun had never shone, because Soo and Sweep begin to clean up the house.
"Episode 4 - Home Video"	4 November 1983
Matthew gets a camcorder to record the daily activities of Sooty, Sweep and Soo, but trouble begins when they object to having their private lives made public. Also, Steve Steen and Jim Sweeney star in the video adventure story, Travels in Teddington. NOTE: Steve Steen and Jim Sweeney guest stars in this episode
"Episode 5 - Body Building"	11 November 1983
When the local paper runs a competition to find the strongest man, Sooty, Sweep, Soo and Matthew decide to enter. They use some body building machines to build up their strength and muscles. Then Geoff Capes, the strongest man in Britain arrives on the scene. NOTE: Geoff Capes guest stars in this episode
"Episode 6 - Guinea Pig and The Flea of Circus"	18 November 1983
Sooty, Sweep and Soo all have their own favourite pets. Sooty likes performing fleas, the other a guinea pig. Matthew discovers he doesn't care for either when the animals drive him out of the house. But he calms down when Percy Edwards introduces him to some other interesting animals. NOTE: Percy Edwards guest stars in this episode
"Episode 7 - Sooty Alone"	25 November 1983
When Sweep and Soo go on holiday, Sooty has Matthew all to himself, but problems soon arise.
"Episode 8 - Football Crazy"	2 December 1983
Sooty, Sweep and Soo are mad about football, and Matthew is mad with them because they play the game inside the house. He gets Mark Chamberlain, a top professional footballer, to play with them on a local pitch. Matthew thinks he's a good goalie, but Mark and Sooty soon show him otherwise. NOTE: Mark Chamberlain guest stars in this episode This episode was among three episodes featured in the 1987 VHS release Sooty – Out and About.
"Episode 9 - Soo's Party Problem"	9 December 1983
Soo's going to a party, but the rest of the gang are a bit jealous and are hindering her when she tries to get ready. But all's well when she brings home Ray Allen and Lord Charles. NOTE: Ray Alan and Lord Charles guest star in this episode This episode was among five episodes featured in the 1998 VHS release Sooty – Biggest Party Video
"Episode 10 - Return of Alphonse"	16 December 1983
When Alphonse comes to stay with Sooty, Sweep and Soo he brings his charming little sister with him -- but she turns out to be not so charming after all. NOTE: Ben Corbett guest stars in this episode as Alphonse
"Episode 11 - The Magic Wand"	30 December 1983
Sooty gets out his magic wand and some amazing things happen.
"Episode 12 - All Blocked Up"	6 January 1984
Matthew, Sooty, Sweep and Soo are having trouble with the plumbing, but they get some help from swimmer Duncan Goodhew. It's early morning in Sooty's house and Sooty, Sweep and Soo have slept in Matthew's bed. They wake up to hear Matthew talking in his sleep. When Matthew asks for the tin opener Sooty hands it to him! NOTES: Duncan Goodhew guest stars in this episode This episode was among three episodes featured in the 1986 VHS release Sooty & Superdog.
"Episode 13 - Father's Day"	13 January 1984
Sooty, Sweep and Soo give Matthew breakfast in bed for Father's day. They take him on a picnic in the garden. Later Matthew's father Harry Corbett comes to see him. He has come around to the house, to show the gang the new house he's made for Sooty, Sweep and Soo. NOTE: Harry Corbett guest stars in this episode, His only appearance in this format of The Sooty Show.
"Episode 14 - It's a Cold World"	20 January 1984
Sooty and Sweep have colds and are feeling sorry for themselves. In searching for a cure in Sooty's Grandad's magic cold cure book they meet Paul Goddard the clown. When Soo catches the cold, the gang decide to go to bed with a hot drink and a story from Matthew. NOTE: Richard Gauntlet guest stars in this episode as Professor Crump the Clown
"Episode 15 - Bring and Buy"	27 January 1984
Sooty, Sweep and Soo decide to have a bring-and-buy sale in their garden in aid of their Cub and Brownie pack, and Ted Moult arrives to help them. NOTE: Ted Moult guest stars in this episode
"Episode 16 - The Brush Off"	3 February 1984
Sooty, Sweep and Soo have become artists, but like all beginners they seem to get more on themselves than on their canvasses. By the end of the day, Matthew wishes they would do anything else but paint. Then Connie Creighton arrives on the scene and shows them how it should be done. NOTE: Connie Creigton guest stars in this episode
"Episode 17 - Loss of Memory"	10 February 1984
Sweep has a fall and loses his memory, but when Sweep gets a lot of special attention, Sooty and Soo decide to take a 'fall' and lose their memory to get attention from Matthew. Matthew ends up following a trail of sweets to find Sooty, but in the end he ends up back in the Sootymobile. In the end Matthew finds out that they were doing it for attention. NOTE: Frank Thornton guest stars in this episode as Doctor Hugh
"Episode 18 - CB Radio"	17 February 1984
The Sooty gang have become CB radio enthusiasts and they confuse Matthew when they talk in CB jargon. When a dog gets involved more problems are caused and this leads Sooty, Sweep and Soo to a musical encounter with Dave Lee Travis. NOTE: Dave Lee Travis guest stars in this episode
"Episode 19 - Imaginary Pets"	24 February 1984
Matthew is fed up with Sooty, Sweep and Soo - their imaginary pets are causing chaos in the house. He dresses up as a monkey to get his own back, but they turn the tables on him when Johnny Morris comes to interview a 'talking monkey'. NOTE: Johnny Morris guest stars in this episode
"Episode 20 - Soo Leaves Home"	2 March 1984
Soo is fed up with the attitude of the male chauvinists in her life and she decides to leave home. This causes havoc and devastates Matthew, Sooty and Sweep. In order to resolve the problem, Matthew goes to live in the garden.

==== 1985: Series 9 ====
Note: all the episodes from this series had a running time of 15 minutes and not the usual 20 minutes

Title	Original airdate
"Treasure Hunt"	3 January 1985
In the first of a new series to bring in the New Year for younger viewers, Soo, Sweep and Sooty play hunt the thimble. This gives them the idea to play hunt whatever you can think of, which causes Matthew endless trouble and also upsets Windsor Davies, as the gang hunt for treasure on his allotment. NOTE: Windsor Davies guest stars in this episode
"Keeping a Secret"	10 January 1985
Sooty, Sweep and Soo think they are good at keeping secrets, but instead, they give the game away, much to Matthew's annoyance. When they do manage to keep a secret, Matthew finds out and ends up in deep water at Windsor Safari Park. He also has to cope with a large whale.
"Matt'll Fix It"	17 January 1985
Matthew sees himself as the 'fixer' of all time and invites impressionist Johnny More to help him 'fix it' for the gang. NOTE: Johnny More guest stars in this episode
"Superdog"	24 January 1985
Superdog Sweep takes on strongman Geoff Capes, and then has to rescue some children from a runaway truck. Sooty, Sweep and Soo are fast asleep in bed, with each of them dreaming. Both Sooty and Soo dream about being conductors, while Sweep dreams that he is a superhero, by the name of Superdog! At breakfast Matthew explains that the world's strongest man, special guest, Geoff Capes is giving a demonstration of his strength later on that day. NOTES: Geoff Capes guest stars in this episode. This episode was among three episodes featured in the 1986 VHS release Sooty & Superdog. It was also featured in the 2001 DVD/VHS release Cult Kids Classics 2 (along with episodes of Rainbow, Jamie and the Magic Torch, Danger Mouse, Chorlton and the Wheelies and Count Duckula).
"Bathtime"	31 January 1985
Bathtime turns into a nightmare for Matthew. NOTE: Anna Dawson guest stars in this episode
"Beauty Contest"	7 February 1985
The gang need £50 and after realizing they have no money in their money boxes, decide to enter a local beauty contest. However, Soo finds the whole thing degrading and refuses to take part. Matthew and Sooty decide to enter Sweep instead! NOTE: Barry Cryer guest stars in this episode
"Alphonse"	14 February 1985
Sooty, Sweep and Soo have made a robot. NOTE: Ben Corbett makes the last of three appearances as Alphonse on The Sooty Show, Technical Glamour also guest stars in this episode
"Night Time Pranks"	21 February 1985
Matthew thinks he has frightened Sooty, Sweep and Soo when he tells them a ghost story. He boasts that nothing frightens him, but his little friends show that is not so.
"Magic"	28 February 1985
There's magic in the air. Sooty gets busy with Izzy Wizzy and, before she knows where she is, Matthew's Auntie is transported from outside the railway station into Sooty's kitchen. Sooty also gives her, Matthew, Sweep and Soo lessons in magic - with unexpected results. NOTE: June Whitfield guest stars in this episode as Aunty Gertrude
"Speedy"	7 March 1985
Less haste, more speed: this is the lesson Matthew tries to get across to Sooty, Sweep and Soo. And he does so by telling them the story of the tortoise and the hare. However, when he tries to prove the point, things go disastrously wrong.
"I'm Clever Too"	14 March 1985
Sweep is showing off trying to prove he is clever too. Matthew goes looking for Sweep and finds an impressionist out training her dog. NOTE: Faith Brown guest stars in this episode
"Automatic Everything"	21 March 1985
Sooty, Sweep and Soo like automation - automatic washing-up machines, automatic feeder and breakfast cooker. But when Bernie Clifton arrives from an automation company things get out of hand - until the Sooty gang come to the rescue with a super piece of automation. NOTE: Bernie Clifton guest stars in this episode
"Super Star"	28 March 1985
Matthew is up bright and early, explaining that this is the only time he can get some peace from the 'terrible three'! He switches the radio on, which reminds him that Sweep had entered a song contest, sending a tape off of his own song! Matthew explains how awful Sweeps song is and that it's quite embarrassing that he entered! Matthew decides to play his Alvin Stardust tape, but the tape is missing and in its place he finds a sausage! NOTE: Alvin Stardust guest stars in this episode This episode was featured in the 2003 DVD release Classic Kids Hits: from School Disco (along with episodes of Rainbow, Jamie and the Magic Torch, Danger Mouse, Chorlton and the Wheelies and Count Duckula).

==== 1985/1986: Series 10 ====
Title	Original airdate
"Sooty's Busy Christmas"	26 December 1985
It's Christmas and Sooty and Matthew visit children at the hospital. And then they all go to a show... and then to a big party with many children. The gang have a really busy Christmas Day opening their presents and helping their friend Bernie with his Christmas Show. NOTES: Bernie Clifton and Richard Cadell guest star in this episode. Richard's next appearance on Sooty would be the 1998 series of Sooty & Co and would take over from Matthew the following year. This episode was among two episodes featured in the 1988 VHS release The Sooty Christmas Show. This episode was also among four episodes featured in the 1997 VHS release My Bumper Christmas Sooty.
"Sootograms"	8 April 1986
Sweep has singing lessons for his new career in Sooty's latest Singing Sootograms venture. Matthew and Soo help by making birthday cakes with plenty of cream in them, and guest Spike Milligan is at the receiving end of all this wild activity. NOTE: Guest starring Spike Milligan
"Bad Luck"	15 April 1986
Sweep is having bad luck. They go to a field to play fisbee so that nothing can go wrong but it does. Then he sneezes and knocks over Sooty's New Field. NOTE: Guest starring Duncan Trillo This episode was among six episodes featured in the 1987 double VHS release Sooty's House (along with Sooty and Co).
"Time Capsule"	22 April 1986
Matthew, Sooty, Sweep and Soo make a Time Capsule, but have trouble finding a place to bury it. They think it would be a good idea to make one so that in a hundred years time people will know how they lived in the 1980s. NOTE: Guest starring Rory McGrath This episode was among two episodes featured in the 1988 VHS release Sooty's Time Capsule
"Balance"	29 April 1986
Matthew is into Yoga. He tries to do some of the balancing exercises that the book suggests but he gets no help from his friends, Sooty, Sweep and Soo. He tries to show them how good they are by taking them to the local gym, but by the time they are finished with him he is well off balance. To cheer him up they bring in Paul Goddard on his unicycle. NOTE: Guest starring Richard Gauntlet
"Money Doesn't Grow on Trees"	6 May 1986
Matthew owes the bank £5 but he has not got it when the bank decides to collect, Soo deposits the money she, Sweep and Sooty have gathered together, when Mr Wolfe from the bank arrives, strange things happen concerning the cash. NOTE: Frank Thornton guest stars in this episode as Mr Wolfe
"Stately Home"	13 May 1986
Sooty, Sweep and Soo want to open their house as a stately home, so they go to a real stately home for some tips. They take a tour with someone at the stately home and have trouble with a cannon. They decide to invite a few people to come round to their house, but when they mean a few then actually mean 10000 people. Matthew thinks it's a crazy idea, but then when he thinks of all the money they could make he agrees. Sweep thinks he's found Henry VIII's bath water and Matthew ends up drinking it. NOTE: Mike Read guest stars in this episode as a burglar. This episode was among three episodes featured in the 1987 VHS release Sooty – Out and About. It was also among three episodes featured in the 1989 VHS release Sooty's Stately Home and Other Stories.
"Connie and Soo"	20 May 1986
Matthew and Sooty are up to their male chauvinist tricks again - but they reckon without the tenacity of Connie and Soo who decide to fight back. Things get rather heated when all of them try to do each other's jobs, and the problem is not helped by a little dog who stirs up trouble. NOTE: Connie Creighton guest stars in this episode
"Ventriloquism"	27 May 1986
Soo reads a book about throwing your voice. Matthew gets a ventriloquist dummy, but he runs away, so they go to the school to find him. Sooty, Sweep and Soo upset Eli the Ventriloquist Dummy who runs off. NOTES: Beaumount and Nikki guest star in this episode This episode was among two episodes featured in the 1988 VHS release Sooty's Time Capsule
"Take a Walk"	3 June 1986
After returning from a trip to the Himalayas, Matthew bores everyone silly with his tales of mountain climbing very high.
"Moths"	10 June 1986
Matthew decides to try and catch moths, but as usual Sooty, Sweep and Soo thwart his attempts! Poor Matthew gets a little wet during his hunt! A blue bottle fly is annoying Sooty and Matthew. Spider-Man comes to rescue them from the fly. And they go to catch moths, including the water bear. NOTE: Roy Kinnear guest stars in this episode as 'Spider-Man' (not the comic book character of the same name)
"Amateur Dramatics"	17 June 1986
Sooty, Sweep and Soo are putting on a play at the local hall. But the actors all pull out, and the scenery and props weren't ordered. So Matthew puts on a one man show. At the end they sing a song "It's An Actors Life For Me". NOTE: This episode was featured in the 1989 VHS release Children's Favourites – Volume 4 (along with episodes of Rainbow and Button Moon).
"Creepy Crawlies"	24 June 1986
After seeing in their school reports that Sooty, Sweep and Soo have all done poorly in nature studies. Matthew takes them out to the countryside so they can see all the interesting insects and learn to appreciate them. NOTE: Aiden J. Harvey guest stars in this episode
"Star Gazing"	1 July 1986
Sooty dreams about horoscopes and stars. Aunty Gertrude looks at a star chart, but there are some stars missing so they go to Sooty's Space Centre to find them. Once they're there, they have to find the missing stars, but Soo ends up going in a rocket, but she lands home safely in the end. Then Sooty wakes up from his dream. NOTE: June Whitfield guest stars in this episode as Aunty Gertrude This episode was featured in the 1989 VHS release Children's Favourites: Bedtime Stories (along with episodes of Rainbow and Button Moon).

==== 1987: Series 11 ====
Note: the episodes from this series were back to the usual running time of 20 minutes

Title	Original airdate
"Down Dog"	6 January 1987
Sweep is reading his book called 'Sweep's Masterplan for more attention' Sweep doesn't talk, laugh and acts very depressed. Matthew, Sooty and Soo are very worried about him and try to cheer him up, but Sweep confesses to Matthew that he was making it up just for more attention. NOTE: This episode was among six episodes featured in the 1987 double VHS release Sooty and Co (along with Sooty's House).
"Marathon"	13 January 1987
Matthew is training for a marathon. He challenges Soo to a race. So Soo gets Sooty and Sweep to help her make sure Matthew gets put in his place. NOTE: This episode was among six episodes featured in the 1987 double VHS release Sooty and Co (along with Sooty's House).
"On the Piste"	20 January 1987
Matthew and Sooty go skiing. Sooty breaks the downhill speed record and Matthew thinks he can do better. So Matthew breaks everything and needs to be seen by a doctor. NOTES: Frank Thornton guest stars in this episode as Dr. Hugh. He previously appeared on Money Doesn't Grow On Trees from 1986 as Mr Wolfe. This episode was among six episodes featured in the 1987 double VHS release Sooty and Co (along with Sooty's House).
"Millionaire"	27 January 1987
Matthew has won the football pools, and is expecting a big prize. So they go and buy new cars for each of them. NOTE: This episode was among three episodes featured in the 1989 VHS release Sooty's Stately Home and Other Stories.
"White Lies"	3 February 1987
Sooty, Sweep and Soo are walking through the park, on their way to the police station to hand in the scarf Soo had found. NOTE: Ann Beach guest stars in this episode as Detective Sergeant Sarah Snoop This episode was among six episodes featured in the 1987 double VHS release Sooty's House (along with Sooty and Co).
"Rabbit Trap"	10 February 1987
Matthew is hungry, but doesn't fancy anything he has at home. So he decides to make rabbit pie, but first he needs to catch a rabbit. NOTE: This episode was among three episodes featured in the 1987 VHS release Sooty – Out and About.
"Bored Games"	17 February 1987
When Sooty, Sweep and Soo make their own quiz and try to answer the question, Is it possible for a 10 year old to ride a motorbike while on top of a six foot ladder?
"Tap Time"	24 February 1987
Connie comes over to teach Soo tap dancing. Matthew says he was a great tap dancer, so Sweep looks in the loft for Matthew's old tap shoes. But Sweep and Matthew fall through the ceiling. NOTE: Connie Creighton guest stars in this episode This episode was among three episodes featured in the 1989 VHS release Sooty's School Trip.
"Perfume"	3 March 1987
Soo goes overboard with her perfume, so Matthew teaches them about how sensitive their noses are, but it turns out Sweep's isn't very sensitive. Then Matthew gets made up by a door-to-door make-up sales lady. NOTES: Brenda Longman Guest Stars in this episode as Brenda the Pongo Products Sales Lady This episode was among six episodes featured in the 1987 double VHS release Sooty's House (along with Sooty and Co).
"Sooty's Restaurant"	10 March 1987
It's Sweeps birthday and since they can't afford to go out to a restaurant they decide to open their own. After rolling down the hill in a shopping trolley they open the restaurant. Matthew the chef doesn't know how to make the food their first customer orders. NOTE: Anna Quayle guest stars in this episode This episode was among two episodes featured in the 1989 VHS release Sooty's Restaurant.
"Computer Dating"	17 March 1987
Matthew tries computer dating - with Sooty's encouragement. NOTE: Anna Karen guest stars in this episode as Mrs Woodhead
"Health Food"	24 March 1987
Soo goes on a health food craze and thinks everyone should eat a lot of bran. Sooty, Sweep and Matthew go out to buy food that Soo won't let them eat. NOTE: This episode was among two episodes featured in the 1989 VHS release Sooty's Restaurant.
"Cuddly Toys"	31 March 1987
Soo's upset because Sweep and Sooty took all beans out of her beanbag, so Matthew cheers Soo up by making toys out of Sooty's Cuddly Toy Machine which ends up making loads of Sooties. Matthew sings "There's Only One Genuine Sooty". NOTE: This episode was among three episodes featured in the 1989 VHS release Sooty's Magic Lamp and Other Stories.

==== 1988: Series 12 ====
Title	Original airdate
"The Big Surprise"	7 January 1988
Matthew surprises Sooty, Sweep and Soo with a new bedroom. They have been staying at a friends house and have yet to return. NOTE: This episode was among three episodes featured in the 1988 VHS release Sooty – The Big Surprise. This episode was also among five episodes featured in the 2010 DVD release also titled Sooty – The Big Surprise.
"Sooty's School Trip"	14 January 1988
Matthew takes Sooty, Sweep and Soo and their classmates on a trip to the museum, but Matthew is a boring teacher. They are getting ready for a school trip, but Matthew is still in bed and still has to make lunches for them. So, he rushes up and says if he's calm and organised everything will be ok. NOTE: This episode was among three episodes featured in the 1989 VHS release Sooty's School Trip.
"Sooty's Magic Lamp"	21 January 1988
Matthew is reading Sooty, Sweep and Soo a story about Aladdin and his magic lamp. They would like to grant Matthew's wishes and so they haven't help him clear out the loft. They find a magic lamp in the attic and it has a genie inside. NOTE: Bernard Bresslaw guest stars in this episode This episode was among three episodes featured in the 1989 VHS release Sooty's Magic Lamp and Other Stories. This episode was also among three episodes featured in the 2008 DVD release The Sooty Show – Izzy Wizzy.
"Good Luck, Bad Luck"	28 January 1988
Sooty, Sweep, Soo and Matthew all experience much good luck and bad luck. Soo finds £5 after seeing two magpies together, whilst poor Matthew ends up spilling tea all over himself, and things begin falling over in his bedroom after he leaves his shoes on the table! Sooty, Sweep, Soo and Matthew are being very superstitious today. NOTE: Brenda Longman guest stars in this episode as a fortune teller
"Return of Superdog"	4 February 1988
Matthew has been reading all about Superman in a comic, and at the same time as this, Sweep has begun displaying unusual feats of strength. Little do they realise that Sweep is really the heroic Superdog, an alien dog from a dying planet who plummeted to Earth, but was unfortunately followed by an evil enemy dog, none other than Butch! NOTE: Butch makes an appearance in this episode. The first of two in this series of The Sooty Show. This episode was among three episodes featured in the 1988 VHS release Sooty – The Big Surprise.
"Cellular Phone"	11 February 1988
Sooty and his pals play with a toy telephone they've made out of two old baked bean cans and a piece of string. Matthew shows Sooty, Sweep and Soo the latest high-tech cellular radio phone he has been sent on a free trial and they have fun ringing up a number for horoscopes and one for a recipe line. Then they receive a second cellular phone in the post.
"Make and Do"	18 February 1988
Sooty, Sweep and Soo are making things but Matthew is none too pleased because they have unraveled many toilet rolls and cut out the full washing-up liquid bottle. Matthew tells them they are meant to use them when they are empty. They decide to make things and later on, they get a special visit from a paper teaser. NOTE: Terri Carol guest stars in this episode This episode was among three episodes featured in the 1989 VHS release Sooty's Magic Lamp and Other Stories.
"Overnight Away"	25 February 1988
Sweep puts bones in Sooty's cupboard but Sooty tricks Sweep by taking the bones away. Matthew decides he's going to spend the night away and packs his suitcase. Sooty starts crying because of an onion in Matthew's suitcase. Matthew decides he'll just take a carrier bag as he has too much stuff and heads out. During the night, they get scared by a noise and a shadow on the wall, but it turns out to be Matthew's carrier bag. Matthew and Soo sing "Home Sweet Home". NOTE: This episode was among three episodes featured in the 1988 VHS release Sooty – The Big Surprise.
"Burglar Box"	3 March 1988
When Matthew becomes concerned about home security, Sooty invents a 'Burglar Box' to keep things safe from burglars. Matthew thinks it won't work, but gets outsmarted by the box. Then the Burglar Box gets stolen and Sooty leads Matthew on a wild goose chase. NOTE: This episode was featured in the 1988 VHS release Children's Favourites – Volume 2 (along with episodes of Rainbow and Button Moon).
"Hidden Talent"	10 March 1988
Matthew and Sweep wants to tell jokes but there is a slight problem as Sweep doesn't know any jokes, so Matthew tries to help Sweep. In the end, Soo doesn't want to sing and Sooty and Sweep decide to play the drums. They all want to enter a local talent contest. NOTES: Iron Maiden's Nicko McBrain guest stars in this episode This episode was among two episodes featured in the 1988 VHS release The Sooty Christmas Show. This episode was also among five episodes featured in the 2010 DVD release Sooty – The Big Surprise.
"Arguing"	17 March 1988
Sooty, Sweep and Soo are arguing. Matthew wants them to stop doing that, he asks Sooty if he can help him turn Sweep and Soo into lemons. Soo is trying to read her book in peace but Sweep keeps annoying her by singing loudly all the time.
"Ancestors"	24 March 1988
Matthew, Sooty, Sweep and Soo look for their ancestors. Sooty goes to a honey farm, Sweep to a butcher and Soo to a Chinese restaurant. NOTES: Butch makes his second appearance in this series of The Sooty Show This episode was among three episodes featured in the 1989 VHS release Sooty's Stately Home and Other Stories.
"When I Was A Lad"	31 March 1988
Matthew is going on about the luxuries in life and how he could do without them like he did 'When He Was A Lad'. Matthew tells them he will go out and have a better day than Sooty, Sweep and Soo who are going out with Connie to Chessington World of Adventures. They are in their bedroom where Sooty is playing a trick on Soo by taking her teddy bear, Bruno. NOTE: Connie Creighton guest stars in this episode This episode was featured in the 1989 VHS release Children's Favourites – Volume 3 (along with episodes of Rainbow and Button Moon).

==== 1988: Series 13 ====
Title	Original airdate
"Matthew's New Room"	6 September 1988
Matthew has had an uncomfortable night's sleep, having slept on the living room floor because he is having his bedroom done up by Connie. Things get worse when a bag of rubbish falls on him, waking him up. Note: Connie Creighton guest stars in this episode.
"Bowled Over"	13 September 1988
Sooty and Sweep play a game of skittles, but they wake up Soo. Soo isn't happy about them playing ball games inside the house so she goes and tells Matthew, but he is playing ball games as well. Matthew decides to confiscate all the balls. Matthew talks about bowling being his favourite ball game. Soo isn't impressed and goes to complain to Matthew. When Soo arrives in Matthew's bedroom, Matthew is explaining how he loves ball games, while Soo is moaning about Sooty and Sweep. Matthew is playing with a ball and tennis racket, which leaves Soo even more annoyed that he hasn't listened to her. NOTE: Dennis Taylor guest stars in this episode This episode was among five episodes featured in the 1990 VHS release Sooty's Bumper Special.
"Lists"	20 September 1988
Sooty and Matthew are busy putting together a personal planner, which includes a list for Matthew of what he's going to do during the day and when to do it. Matthew suggests that Sooty should follow his example, which results in both Sooty and Soo both making lists.
"Matt Has a Baby"	4 October 1988
Sooty hears Matthew talking on the telephone to the doctor about expecting a baby. Saying it'll be nice to hear the patter of tiny feet around the house, when Sooty arrives, it makes him very confused and shocked, causing him to faint. NOTE: Brenda Longman guest stars in this episode
"Moving House"	11 October 1988
Matthew says that the house is old and worn out, after which he presents a huge list of problems that need sorting out. Sooty, Sweep and Soo are all in good moods, with Soo saying she's happy because she realises how lucky they are to have such a beautiful and comfortable bedroom and that they live in a lovely home. However, Matthew doesn't feel the same as he feels he is having too many problems around the house which include door knobs falling off! NOTE: This episode was among three episodes featured in the 1989 VHS release Sooty's School Trip.
"The Unreal Ghostbusters"	18 October 1988
Matthew is messing about with bed sheets in his bedroom, pretending to be a ghost after reading a book of ghost stories, called Spooky Stories! Sooty and Soo have borrowed the book and are enjoying reading the scary stories when Sweep interrupts them. Soo is convinced that Sooty is afraid of ghosts, but he claims he's shaking from being cold...while she states that as ghosts do not exist, she isn't frightened. NOTE: This episode was among three episodes featured in the 1990 VHS release Sooty Wants a Pet.
"Superdog and the Comedian"	1 November 1988
Underneath that unintelligent exterior lies a superhero who is prepared to answer any cries for help. Sweep awakes hearing that someone needs his help as Superdog!, but unfortunately Sweep has lost his Superdog outfit, until he finds it in the linen basket! Superdog arrives to help a very odd looking 'lady', but crash lands in some rubbish. The 'lady' tells Superdog she was screaming as the milkman had delivered the wrong milk! NOTE: Derek Deadman guest stars in this episode as himself and The Comedian This episode was also among six episodes featured in the 2001 DVD/VHS release Sweep Superdog.
"Nothing Ever Happens"	8 November 1988
Sooty uses his magic wand to turn a toy cat into a real cat and then turns Matthew into a lion, a monkey and a bear. When Sweep needs to write an essay for school called 'Something that happened to me that was interesting', he finds it quite difficult, because nothing happens that is interesting or exciting to him. NOTES: Mike Reid guest stars in this episode as escaped prisoner "Banana Briggs" This episode was among five episodes featured in the 1990 VHS release Sooty's Bumper Special.
"Inventors"	15 November 1988
Sooty decides to invent something. He invents an automatic opener (if you point this at something and press a button, it opens it, e.g. a door). He lets Matthew have a try at it and Matthew sends Sweep through the roof! That gives Sweep an idea to invent something. Sooty makes some more inventions such as a lift, but it throws Sweep on the roof! NOTES: Tommy Boyd guest stars in this episode This episode was among five episodes featured in the 1990 VHS release Sooty's Bumper Special.
"Messing About in Boats"	22 November 1988
Matthew wins some money and is looking at brochures to see which boat he should buy. He asks Sooty, Sweep and Soo and they all have different ideas. Matthew comes back with his new boat and they want to see it, but they discover that Matthew was talking about a model boat and not a real boat. NOTE: This episode was featured in the 1989 VHS release Children's Summer Stories (along with episodes of Rainbow and Button Moon).
"Royalty"	29 November 1988
Sooty, Sweep and Soo are in their bedroom and are discussing the Royals. Sooty then tells Sweep and Soo he's met the Queen, but they don't believe him so they find Matthew to tell him about the lie Sooty has told. NOTE: Jeannette Charles guest stars in this episode as "Queen Elizabeth II" This episode was among three episodes featured in the 1989 VHS release Sooty's Christmas Party and Other Stories
"Get Your Skates On"	13 December 1988
Sooty, Sweep and Soo would like to go skating, so they ask Matthew and he says not today, but another day. Soo says that when people say that it means never. NOTE: Nicky Slater guest stars in this episode This episode was among three episodes featured in the 1989 VHS release Sooty's Christmas Party and Other Stories
"Down Under"	20 December 1988
Matthew, Sooty, Sweep and Soo have just returned from a holiday in Australia and they become obsessed with anything Australian. NOTE: Aiden J. Harvey guest stars in this episode This episode was among three episodes featured in the 1990 VHS release Sooty's Golf Crazy Golf.
"Sooty's Christmas Party"	26 December 1988
Sooty, Sweep and Soo have a splendid time at Christmas with a party for their friends and many lovely presents. NOTE: Roger Walker and Suzy Atchinson guest star in this episode This episode was among three episodes featured in the 1989 VHS release Sooty's Christmas Party and Other Stories This episode was also among four episodes featured in the 1997 VHS release My Bumper Christmas Sooty. It was then released on DVD in 2016 titled Winter Wonders Collection in a compilation with 4 episodes of Rainbow and Sooty's Christmas Show from 1975.

==== 1989: Series 14 ====
Title	Original airdate
"Honking Nose"	5 September 1989
Something very odd is happening, Sooty and Soo have discovered that Sweep's nose "honks" and his ears "ring". When they go shopping, they confuse the shoppers. NOTE: This episode was among three episodes featured in the 1990 VHS release Sooty's Favourite Stories. This episode was also among six episodes featured in the 2001 DVD/VHS release Sweep Superdog and then among three episodes featured in the 2008 DVD release The Sooty Show – Happy Birthday, Sooty.
"Stay Awake"	12 September 1989
Matthew, Sooty, Sweep and Soo return from visiting friends. Matthew decided to travel back during the night to save getting stuck in traffic jams, so Sooty and Soo slept in the car during the night, but Sweep didn't! Sweep finds it hard to stay awake and ends up sleepwalking! NOTE: This episode was among five episodes featured in the 1990 VHS release Sooty's Bumper Special.
"Radio Control Car"	19 September 1989
We all live in the modern world and gadgets are part of it. A lot of things can be controlled by us from a long distance. However, what happens when things go wrong for Matthew, Sooty, Sweep and Soo? Matthew has got a machine which makes orange juice, but Matthew says he's nervous because it's his first time using it and he isn't lucky with high-tech gadgets, but he gets a surprise and the machine is faulty! NOTE: This episode was among three episodes featured in the 1990 VHS release Sooty's Favourite Stories.
"Sooty's Golf Crazy Golf"	26 September 1989
Matthew is practicing playing golf in his bedroom, but Sooty takes his golf ball and then his golf club. When Matthew boasts about being an excellent golfer, Sooty and Sweep decide to challenge him to a game of crazy golf!, not real golf. Matthew is soon taken down a peg or two with funny results! NOTE: This episode was among three episodes featured in the 1990 VHS release Sooty's Golf Crazy Golf.
"Grin and Bear It"	3 October 1989
Sweep is reading a book, wearing an odd coat and tells Soo that he can make himself grow twice the size and he does so. Then Soo sees that Sooty was hiding under Sweep so he wasn't magically taller after all, so they go and try and fool Matthew who's amazed at Sweeps height, but notices his tummy is making a noise and realises that Sooty's under there. NOTE: This episode was among three episodes featured in the 1990 VHS release Sooty's Golf Crazy Golf.
"High as a Kite"	10 October 1989
Sooty has made himself a box kite, but Sweep accidentally breaks it. Fortunately though, Sooty has lots more he's made, but Soo doesn't think that any of them will fly, so they all go to see Matthew for advice about kites. When Matthew sees Sooty's kite, he makes fun of it and tells him it needs to be more aerodynamic like the paper aeroplane he's made.
"Sweep's Family"	17 October 1989
Sweep's family are coming to visit, but it causes great confusion when they all look the same! Sweep has a very large family and invites them all to his party. Sweep's brothers Swipe, Swap and Swoop come to stay but they are hard to tell apart. NOTE: This episode was remade in Sooty & Co in 1994. NOTE: Richard Gauntlet guest stars in this episode. This episode was among three episodes featured in the 1990 VHS release Sooty's Favourite Stories. It was also among five episodes featured in the 1998 VHS release Sooty – Biggest Party Video and then among six episodes featured in the 2001 DVD/VHS release Sweep Superdog.
"The Good, The Bad and The Furry"	24 October 1989
When Matthew discovers that Sooty, Sweep and Soo are obsessed with computer games, he decides to teach them some of the games he used to play. Sooty, Sweep and Soo are bored, but when Matthew suggests a game of Cowboys and Indians, they think that's boring too, but they soon change their minds and have much fun. NOTE: Connie Creighton guest stars in this episode This episode was featured in the 1990 VHS release Sooty and Rainbow (along with an episode of Rainbow).
"Fat & 40"	31 October 1989
It's Matthew's birthday and he is 40, but he is feeling old and unhealthy so he decides to do something about it. Sooty, Soo and Sweep give Matthew a wig, some wrinkle cream and some oversized boxer shorts. Matthew decides to change his lifestyle and does some exercise, but ends up dropping a dumbbell on his foot and slamming the door on his hand! NOTE: Brenda Longman guest stars in this episode as Olga/Doris the Dinner Lady This episode was among five episodes featured in the 1990 VHS release Sooty's Bumper Special.
"Sooty Wants a Pet"	7 November 1989
Sooty, Sweep and Soo are deciding what pet they would like. Sweep suggests a dog, but Soo isn't so keen. Matthew wants a dog too and teases poor Sweep who thinks he has to move out. Sooty, Sweep and Matthew go and see some police dogs in training and Matthew sings "A Dog Is A Man's Best Friend". Then Matthew decides he'd rather have Sweep than another dog, because he's very special and one of a kind. NOTE: This episode was among three episodes featured in the 1990 VHS release Sooty Wants a Pet. This episode was also among three episodes featured in the 2008 DVD release The Sooty Show – Happy Birthday, Sooty.
"The Hard Sell"	14 November 1989
Matthew has become a mail order catalogue agent and is practicing his sales technique. He tries to persuade firstly Sooty, and then Soo, to order something from the catalogue, but they aren't interested as they have both become agents for rival catalogues. Then Sweep sees Soo and Sooty's catalogues and tells them he wants to order some items from both of them. But when Soo mentions about paying for the order it falls through, as Sweep didn't realise he would have to pay for his order and has no money. NOTE: Ali Bongo guest stars in this episode
"In Camera"	21 November 1989
Matthew buys a new camera for himself and wants to take a group photo of Sooty, Sweep, Soo and himself. They all want to see the photo, so Matthew says he'll go to town after the film has been used up and then Soo reminds him he promised to buy them a new storybook and that gives Matthew and Sooty an idea. They return with photos from their day and Matthew turns it into a story all about Sooty. NOTE: This episode was among three episodes featured in the 1990 VHS release Sooty Wants a Pet.
"A Very Special Day"	28 November 1989
Sooty, Sweep and Soo think Matthew's taking them to the seaside, but Sweep breaks Matthew's alarm clock. Matthew does tease as he pretends that he will not take them to the seaside, but he's a softie really and borrows a car to take them there. NOTE: This episode was featured in the 1990 VHS release Children's Holiday Favourites (along with episodes of Rainbow and Rod, Jane and Freddy). This episode was also among three episodes featured in the 2000 VHS release Sooty – Wet & Wild Water Fun

==== 1990: Series 15 ====
Title	Original airdate
"Bangers and Smash"	3 September 1990
Sweep is obsessed with racing cars and the others play tricks on him. Later Matthew thinks he's the best driver so Soo challenges him to a race. Matthew doesn't do very well so he blames Soo for having a male driver with her, but it's a female driver called Sarah Speedring. At the end, Matthew sings "Sooty's Sooty Mobile". NOTE: This episode was among four episodes featured in the 1991 VHS release Sooty's Big Time Video.
"Love a Duck"	10 September 1990
Sweep thinks that nobody loves him until he meets a plastic duckling called Derek. Derek quacks at Sweep when he asks if he loves him and Sweep's so happy, but Matthew finds out that Derek thought Sweep was his mummy. Matthew, Sooty and Sweep take Derek to the local pond to find his mummy. NOTE: This episode was among two episodes featured in the 1991 VHS release Sooty's Video Fun Pack.
"Sticky Situation"	17 September 1990
Matthew, Sooty, Sweep and Soo are covering books using wrapping paper and mending things, but Sweep gets covered in sellotape. Sooty makes Sweep's book tiny and then enormous which breaks the handle off Sooty's mug. Matthew tries to fix the handle using some glue and ends up making a mess and rips his shirt sleeve and then gets stuck to the breakfast bar. Later, Sooty, Sweep and Soo make some paper mache and Sweep ends up getting soaked in it and says he'll help mix it in as he misunderstands what Matthew says about soaking it. At the end, they sing "Sticky Situation". NOTE: This episode was among three episodes featured in the 1991 VHS release Little Cousin Scampi and Other Stories. This episode was among five episodes featured in the 2010 DVD release Sooty – The Big Surprise.
"Little Cousin Scampi"	24 September 1990
Sooty receives a letter from his Cousin Scampi but he's not best pleased he's coming to stay. Matthew finds out how naughty Scampi is after he arrives as he throws a cricket ball through the window, ties Matthew's shoelaces together so he falls over, squirts Sooty with a water pistol and pours salt in Matthew's tea. Later, Scampi puts cream cakes in Sweep and Soo's faces and nails the bathroom door shut so Sooty, Sweep and Soo can't escape and finally Matthew falls through a chair in which Scampi sawed one of the legs off. Matthew, Sooty and Sweep chase after Scampi but they slip over banana peels and fall into some hay. Then Matthew feels sad and wants Scampi to return as they can't find him. They receive a tin of chocolates at the door with a note from Little Cousin Scampi inside saying sorry for being so naughty and then he pops out of it. At the end, Matthew sings "Blame It On Scampi". NOTE: This episode is Little Cousin Scampi's first appearance, he would be made a regular character in the following series. This episode was among three episodes featured in the 1991 VHS release Little Cousin Scampi and Other Stories. This episode was among five episodes featured in the 2010 DVD release Sooty – The Big Surprise.
"Little Terrors"	1 October 1990
Sooty and Soo are playing with their toys Mr. Mouse and Mrs. Mole and they show them to Matthew. Sweep doesn't think they're any good and shows them his little family of bones. Sooty and Sweep are playing with their toys in the bath and then Sweep puts his bone in it, but it dissolves. Matthew thinks of a wonderful idea for Sooty and Soo to make models of themselves and he makes one of himself as well. Sweep get jealous as he can't make any so he builds a model making machine which makes little model Sweeps. When Matthew, Sooty and Soo see Sweep's models they're amazed at how lifelike they are. Sooty uses his magic wand to get the machine to make painted models of Sooty, Sweep and Soo in cute little outfits. NOTE: This episode was among four episodes featured in the 1997 VHS release My Bumper Christmas Sooty. This episode was also among three episodes featured in the 2008 DVD release The Sooty Show – Izzy Wizzy and also in a 2016 compilation DVD Spooky Classics Collection with Danger Mouse and Button Moon.
"Just Not Cricket"	8 October 1990
Matthew receives a letter from a local cricket club, he gets excited and Sooty, Sweep and Soo thinks Matthew is boasting again. Matthew challenges Sooty and Sweep to a cricket match but Sooty needs his magic wand to win against Matthew. Soo umpires to makes sure no one cheats. He gets a call from his team captain saying that he found someone else famous to play instead of Matthew, so he made his own game of cricket with Sooty, Sweep and Soo. NOTE: This episode was among four episodes featured in the 1991 VHS release Sooty's Big Time Video.
"Izzy Wizzy"	15 October 1990
Matthew reads a magic spell book which Sooty looks at and he ends up turning Sweep into a frog. He turns Sweep back to himself again. Matthew and Sooty decide to perform a magic show and afterwards, Matthew puts Sooty to bed. But Sooty can't sleep, Matthew gets angry and poor Sooty starts crying. Soo suggests they sing him a lullaby all about magical bears. NOTE: This episode was among two episodes featured in the 1991 VHS release Sooty's Video Fun Pack. This episode was also among three episodes featured in the 2008 DVD release The Sooty Show – Izzy Wizzy.
"What a Load of Rubbish"	22 October 1990
Matthew, Sooty, Sweep and Soo decide they want to help the environment. They start helping out by saving water, turning off lights and cleaning up a local woods. At the end, they all sing "Keen to be Green". NOTE: This episode was among two episodes featured in the 1992 VHS release Sooty - What a Load of Rubbish & Collecting .
"Watersports"	29 October 1990
Matthew tells Sooty, Sweep and Soo about how he used to be called 'Codface Corbett' because he was so great at watersports many years ago. The water doesn't work in the kitchen so Soo decides to fix the pipes while Sooty and Sweep go to see Matthew water ski, but he doesn't do very well! NOTE: This episode was among four episodes featured in the 1991 VHS release Sooty's Big Time Video. This episode was also among three episodes featured in the 2000 VHS release Sooty – Wet & Wild Water Fun
"Dyb Dyb Disaster"	5 November 1990
Matthew has become an Akela, Sooty and Sweep have become Cub Scouts and Soo a Brownie while Auntie Connie a.k.a. Connie Creighton is a Brown Owl who gives Soo some Brownie badges for completing various tasks. Matthew thinks that boys are better at stuff than girls so Connie challenges him so that Sooty and Sweep can win Brownie badges, but things don't go too well. Then Matthew, Sooty and Sweep decide to go camping, but things don't go according to plan. NOTE: Connie Creighton guest stars in this episode This episode was among four episodes featured in the 1991 VHS release Sooty's Big Time Video.
"Collecting"	12 November 1990
Matthew, Sooty, Sweep and Soo are collecting things. Matthew collects stamps, Soo collects pressed flowers and Sooty collects postcards. Sweep decides he'll collect bones but then he changes his mind and wants to collect water. Using his magical powers, Sooty starts collecting very old coins. NOTE: This episode was among two episodes featured in the 1992 VHS release Sooty - What a Load of Rubbish & Collecting .
"Gardeners for Hire"	19 November 1990
Matthew's garden isn't looking as good as it could be, but he can't afford to get a gardener to tidy it, so Sooty suggests he should get a garden box instead. Matthew's upset as all the leaves have fallen off his Bonsai tree, so Sweep takes it. Sooty shows him his magical flower garden and makes a magic flower appear and then a sausage plant for Sweep. Sooty, Sweep and Matthew visit a garden centre and buy a flower box and slug powder, but it ends in chaos. NOTE: This episode was among three episodes featured in the 1991 VHS release Little Cousin Scampi and Other Stories.
"A Job in TV"	26 November 1990
Matthew has seen jobs advertised for TV presenters and announcers at Thames Television and wants to apply. He records his interview with Soo on video so he can show the tape to the lady he has to see at Thames TV, but unknown to him, Sooty and Sweep sabotage it by standing in front of the camera and waving while Matthew is doing his interview. NOTE: Brenda Longman guest stars in this episode.

==== 1991: Series 16 ====
Title	Original airdate
"Return of Scampi"	23 September 1991
Matthew's in a good mood but it doesn't last for long as he falls off a chair, drinks a cup of tea full of salt and finds the shoelaces on his trainers have been tied together. Soo tells him she knows who's been doing all these naughty things and it's Little Cousin Scampi. Scampi uses Sooty's magic wand and put it in Matthew's left hand, making it work on its own. NOTE: This episode was among three episodes featured in the 1992 VHS release Matt Robot and Other Stories.
"A Summertime Christmas"	30 September 1991
Matthew thinks Soo's homemade Christmas presents are a brilliant idea, but when Sooty and Sweep try to make their own, will it turn into a recipe for disaster? NOTE: This episode was featured in the 1992 VHS release The Christmas Collection titled Early Christmas (along with episodes of Rainbow and The Wind in the Willows). This episode was also among four episodes featured in the 1997 VHS release My Bumper Christmas Sooty.
"Car Boot Sale"	7 October 1991
When Sooty and Soo want to find out what Matthew wants for his birthday, he reminds them that they don't have any money. They say they are arranging a Car Boot Sale but they forget to put on the posters where it is taking place. NOTE: This episode was among three episodes featured in the 1992 VHS release Matt Robot and Other Stories.
"Derek's Back"	14 October 1991
Sweep wants to find his friend Derek the little plastic duck who loved him a lot, as he misses him. When Sweep goes to look for it, he doesn't have much luck, But everything ends up alright for everyone. NOTE: This episode was among three episodes featured in the 1992 VHS release Hair Today and Other Stories.
"Matt Robot"	21 October 1991
When Sooty, Sweep and Soo keep asking Matthew for favours, and without a thanks, he tells them they don't need a human being, what they need is a robot. He dresses up as one and his name is Robbie the Robot and plays a trick on Sweep and Soo. NOTE: This episode was among three episodes featured in the 1992 VHS release Matt Robot and Other Stories.
"Hair Today"	28 October 1991
Matthew discovers that he's losing his hair so Sooty makes a magic hair growing potion which he tries out on Sweep and then on Matthew. Things go wrong as instead of making their hair grow, Sweep and Matthew end up bald. To reverse Sooty's spell, they have to find a hair from a bald man and they go and find Duncan Goodhew who gives them a toy hare. They find a note in it and it tells them to travel through the looking glass to the not-so-distant past back when they had hair. They travel through it and then takes them back in time to earlier in the day. Matthew asks Sooty, Sweep and Soo to come back to his bedroom and tell them that it doesn't matter if they have a full head of hair of if they got none at all, as the most important thing is to be happy the way you are. At the end, Soo sings "Bald Can Be Beautiful". NOTE: Duncan Goodhew guest stars in this episode. He previously appeared on All Blocked Up from 1984. This episode was among three episodes featured in the 1992 VHS release Hair Today and Other Stories.
"Three Men in a Boat"	4 November 1991
Matthew decides to take a trip on the river and have a picnic. Sooty, Sweep and Soo think they're going too, but Matthew wants to be on his own for a change. Little Cousin Scampi causes trouble by hiding Sooty's binoculars and Sweep's bone and scares Soo with a shark toy. NOTE: This episode was among three episodes featured in the 1992 VHS release Three Men in a Boat and Other Stories. This episode was also among three episodes featured in the 2000 VHS release Sooty – Wet & Wild Water Fun
"Only Joking"	11 November 1991
It's practical joke day and Sooty, Sweep and Soo have many jokes to play. Simon Smartypants, a TV prankster, plays a joke on Matthew but things can go wrong in The Sooty Show. NOTE: Roger Walker guest stars in this episode as "Simon Smartypants". NOTE: This episode was among three episodes featured in the 1992 VHS release Only Joking and Other Stories.
"Any 5-Year-Old Can Do It"	18 November 1991
Matthew's bragging on about how he knows so much more than Sooty, Sweep and Soo as he has much experience in fixing things. Sooty challenges Matthew to a treasure hunt and things don't go very well leaving Matthew upset. NOTE: This episode was among three episodes featured in the 1992 VHS release Hair Today and Other Stories.
"Cars, Trains, Boats and Planes"	25 November 1991
Matthew shows Sooty many different toy cars. Sweep isn't happy as Soo's on his pretend runaway. Matthew takes Sooty to Teddington Station for a ride to The London Toy Museum. Sooty has a ride on a children's train and helps operate some toy trains too. NOTE: This episode was among three episodes featured in the 1992 VHS release Three Men in a Boat and Other Stories.
"Swinging the Lead"	2 December 1991
Sweep hasn't done his homework but instead of facing the music at school, he comes up with a plan where he pretends to be ill, with a little help from Scampi. NOTE: This episode was among three episodes featured in the 1992 VHS release Three Men in a Boat and Other Stories. This episode was also among six episodes featured in the 2001 DVD/VHS release Sweep Superdog.
"Boarding House"	9 December 1991
Matthew turns the house into a B&B to earn more money. But things don't quite go to plan when setting it up. NOTE: Connie Creighton guest stars in this episode This episode was among three episodes featured in the 1992 VHS release Only Joking and Other Stories.
"Bored Games"	16 December 1991
Sooty's bored and poor Sweep ends up getting stuck in a cupboard playing Blind Man's Buff. Matthew and Sooty go off for a game of bowls but it doesn't go as Matthew expects. Then they both go back home and Matthew sings "Board Games". NOTE: Brenda Longman guest stars in this episode playing a bowler. This episode was among three episodes featured in the 1992 VHS release Only Joking and Other Stories. This episode was also among five episodes featured in the 1998 VHS release Sooty – Biggest Party Video.

==== 1992: Series 17 ====
This was the final series of The Sooty Show as Thames Television lost its ITV franchise at the end of December 1992.

Title	Original airdate
"Stitch in Time"	7 September 1992
Matthew has a new knitting device and he is making orders, so that he can raise a bit of extra money. Sooty, Sweep and Soo notice it and they want to have a go, but Matthew tells them they will need their own wool. Soo then goes off and looks for some but, Sooty and Sweep decide they will untangle the things that Matthew has knitted. But Matthew is unhappy with them at first but then Sooty and Sweep are soon forgiven.
"Magic Egg"	14 September 1992
Sweep and Scampi mess around with Sooty's magic wand. By accident, Sweep makes thousands of balls appear which then turn into one big ball. When he confesses to Matthew, the ball hatches and a dragon appears out of it.
"Back to Front"	21 September 1992
There is a convincing magic in the air, with credit to Sooty's magic wand. Soo is talking in reverse, Matthew is going to his bed when he just woke up and everybody is doing everything back to front. NOTE: This episode was among five episodes featured in the 1998 VHS release Sooty – Biggest Party Video
"Give us a Break"	28 September 1992
When Matthew is taken to hospital, Soo is left looking after him with help of Sooty, Sweep and Scampi. NOTE: Brenda Longman appears in this episode as "Brenda Blunder".
"Happy Birthday Sooty"	5 October 1992
It's Sooty's Birthday, and Matthew, Sweep, Soo and Scampi act as if they have not remembered and shock Sooty with a unique gift. Also, Matthew takes Sooty to the Sooty Museum. When they come back home, Rod, Jane and Freddy appear and sing to Sooty with help from Matthew and Soo. NOTE: Rod, Jane and Freddy guest stars in this episode. This episode was among five episodes featured in the 1998 VHS release Sooty – Biggest Party Video This episode was also among three episodes featured in the 2008 DVD release The Sooty Show – Happy Birthday, Sooty.
"Jigsaw"	12 October 1992
Matthew, Sooty, Sweep and Soo are finishing jigsaw puzzles. Soo has completed her jigsaw, but Sooty's piece of his goes missing and he decides to look for it in the attic. Matthew is nearly done with his and only has one piece to go until Sweep wants some pepper opened and sneezes it everywhere! At the end, Matthew at last puts his jigsaw together, but when he inhales to smell a rose that Scampi gave to Soo, he isn't very happy!
"Bouncers"	19 October 1992
Sweep won't eat his vegetables so Matthew thinks it would be a good idea to tell Sweep a few little white lies, so Sweep will eat his vegetables. NOTE: This episode was also among six episodes featured in the 2001 DVD/VHS release Sweep Superdog.
"Mechanical Pets"	26 October 1992
Sweep gets very confused.
"Hot Stuff"	2 November 1992
Sweep has learnt about fire safety at school and has become hyper sensitive to any kind of fire! However, when Matthew takes things into his own hands and deals with a fire himself, he gets more than he bargained for! NOTE: This episode was also among six episodes featured in the 2001 DVD/VHS release Sweep Superdog.
"Aeroplane"	9 November 1992
Sweep has an obsession with helicopters and fails miserably to build a model one and fails again when playing with little ones. He is given the opportunity of a lifetime though when he is invited to go up in one! Matthew writes a story at the end of the day and reads it to everyone.
"Solid Water"	16 November 1992
Sooty and Scampi won't let Soo and Sweep into their bedroom, so Soo goes and tells Matthew. Matthew gives them a periscope and they find out what's going on, but Sooty paints it before Soo and Sweep can see, so they drill through the roof and then fall through it! Sooty has created Solid Water! Then they decide to play a few tricks on Matthew and Soo makes it snow inside and they have a surprise visit from Connie Creighton as Mother Christmas. Matthew decides to show Connie the Solid Water but the magic has worn off and the bucket of water tips over Connie, but then she gets her own back! NOTE: Connie Creighton guest stars in this episode.
"Time Flies"	23 November 1992
Soo and Matthew's prize entry roses are withered by greenfly and blackfly, so the gang have to create a way to get rid of them and restore the roses back to health. However, the flies then end up covering Sweep so they have to use the formula to get rid of them. The stench of the formula used is ripe on Sweep so he goes for a forced shower. At the same time, Matthew tries unsuccessfully to batter a bluebottle but then decides to take them on a visit to the Butterfly House, accompanied by a song, 'Butterfly'.
"Fanatical Fun"	30 November 1992
Matthew and Sweep are feeling extremely fanatical about energetic activities. Sweep is fanatical about karate and judo, while Matthew on the other hand is completely fanatical about exercising! Once again, he is too fanatical about it so he makes a fool of himself. NOTE: Elaine Ford guest stars in this episode. NOTE: This episode marked the finale of the original Sooty Show. Granada Television airs the new series Sooty & Co. the following year. This episode was among five episodes featured in the 2010 DVD release Sooty – The Big Surprise.
