= CAA =

CAA may refer to:

== Law ==
- Citizenship (Amendment) Act, 2019 of India. The Home Ministry on March 11 notified the implementation of Citizenship Amendment Act's (CAA) rules.
  - Protests regarding the Citizenship (Amendment) Act
- Clean Air Act, United States law to reduce air pollution
- Congressional Apportionment Amendment, unratified pending United States constitutional amendment
- Copyright assignment agreement, to transfer copyright to another party
- Cuban Adjustment Act, United States federal law

== Organizations ==
=== Arts ===
- China Academy of Art, a fine arts college in China founded in 1928
- College Art Association, a professional arts association in the US
- Concert Artistes Association, founded 1897

=== Automobile ===
- Canadian Automobile Association, a federation of clubs across Canada
- China Automobile Association, a roadside assistance provider in China owned by Insurance Australia Group
- Cyprus Automobile Association, a non-profit organization, providing roadside assistance services

=== Aviation ===
==== Airlines ====
- CAA, ICAO airline designator for Atlantic Southeast Airlines, a defunct carrier in the United States
- Central African Airways, a defunct airline, national carrier for the Central African Federation
- Compagnie Africaine d'Aviation, a Congolese airline

==== Regulatory agencies ====
- Civil aviation authority (CAA), general term for a statutory authority that oversees the regulation of civil aviation
- Civil Aviation Authority, the name of these countries' regulators:
  - Civil Aviation Authority (New Zealand)
  - Civil Aviation Authority (South Africa)
  - Civil Aviation Authority (United Kingdom)
  - Civil Aviation Authority (Moldova) (formerly Civil Aviation Administration in English)
  - Civil Aviation Authority of Norway
  - Civil Aviation Authority of the Philippines
- Civil Aviation Agency, the name of two countries' regulators in English:
  - Civil Aviation Agency Slovenia
  - Latvian Civil Aviation Agency
- Civil Aeronautics Administration (disambiguation), two national regulators:
  - Civil Aeronautics Administration (Taiwan), a division of Ministry of Transportation and Communication
  - Civil Aeronautics Administration (United States), formed in 1940 and replaced by the Federal Aviation Agency in 1958

==== Other organizations ====
- Children's Air Ambulance, air ambulance for children in the UK
- Methodist Commission on Aboriginal Affairs, a 1960s independent body within the Methodist Church in Australia

=== Science ===
- Canadian Archaeological Association, publishes archaeological literature
- Canadian Avalanche Association, avalanche awareness and safety
- Carinthian Astronomical Association (Astronomische Vereinigung Kärntens), Austria
- Center for American Archeology, in Kampsville, Illinois, an independent non-profit research and education
- Computer Applications and Quantitative Methods in Archaeology (CAA) - international organization of archaeologists, organizes an annual conference

=== Sports and entertainment ===
- Canyon Athletic Association, an association to organize sports for smaller charter schools in the state of Arizona
- Coastal Athletic Association, an NCAA Division I college athletic conference whose full-time members are in East Coast US states
  - Coastal Athletic Association Football Conference, branded as CAA Football, a technically separate conference for American football operated by the above
- Confederation of African Athletics, a continental association for the sport of athletics in Africa
- Creative Artists Agency, an American talent and sports agency
- Cycle Action Auckland, a pro-cycling advocacy group in Auckland, New Zealand

=== Other organizations ===
- Campaign Against Antisemitism, a UK organisation
- California Alumni Association, the alumni association of the University of California, Berkeley
- Carriage Association of America
- Case Alumni Association, oldest independent alumni organization in the US
- Cat Aficionado Association, a registry of pedigreed felines in China
- Center for Academic Advancement, a part of the Johns Hopkins University Center for Talented Youth
- Center for Army Analysis, US
- China Advertising Association
- Commission for Academic Accreditation, United Arab Emirates
- Commonwealth Association of Architects, an organisation for architects in commonwealth countries
- Council on African Affairs, provided information about Africa to the US, particularly to African Americans

== Science and technology ==
- Cerebral amyloid angiopathy, a form of angiopathy
- Certified anesthesiologist assistant, an allied health professional in the United States
- Computational aeroacoustics, direct simulation of acoustic fields associated with flows
- Computer-aided assessment, assessment performed or mediated through computer methods
- Computer-aided auscultation, computer analysis of stethoscope data
- DNS Certification Authority Authorization, a method for cross-checking security information on the Internet
- Cover Art Archive, a project hosting album cover art images
- CAA, one of the codons for the amino acid glutamine

== Other uses ==
- Command Arms and Accessories, an Israeli firearms manufacturer of Kalashnikov style weapons
- Coventry Arena railway station, station code "CAA"
- Chester A. Arthur, 21st president of the United States
