= Civil Aviation Agency =

Civil Aviation Agency (CAA) may refer to:

- Latvian Civil Aviation Agency
- Civil Aviation Agency Slovenia

== See also ==
- Civil Aeronautics Administration (disambiguation)
- Civil Aviation Authority
