= Dominique DiDia =

General manager of the Vegas Vanguards

Dominique DiDia, known as Domi, is the general manager of the Vegas Vanguards. She was an agent at CAA Sports and co-head of Women's Hockey, after launching the department in 2023, and is a former collegiate player for the NCAA Trinity College team.

== Early life ==
She was born in Los Angeles, California to Erin and Mark DiDia, a music industry executive and talent manager. She has one sister, Nicolette.

She played boys hockey until age 12, then joined the California Selects Girls Hockey Club in Huntington Beach. While majoring in Psychology at Trinity College in Hartford, Connecticut, she played defense for four seasons, served as captain during her senior year, and graduated with the record for the most games played.

== Career ==
After college, DiDia joined the Los Angeles Kings in 2012, where, during her nine-year tenure, she became its director for marketing and content publicity, while also a coach and board member for the LA Lions Girls Hockey Club. She played on the Lions women's adult team as well.

In 2018, DiDia won an Emmy for producing LA Kings sports promo short, We Are All Kings.

In 2022, she became a marketing executive at CAA Sports, launched its women's hockey department in 2023, and co-led the division, while representing women hockey athletes and NFL players. After the 2023 formation of the Professional Women's Hockey League (PWHL), she became a certified agent for PWHL players.

Didia was appointed the inaugural general manager of the new Vegas Vanguards team on May 11, 2026. She began filling the roster of the new team on June 5, 2026, with the launch of the PWHL expansion team signing period. On June 10, she announced her choice of her former Trinity College teammate Kim Weiss for the team's first head coach.
