= AVK =

AVK may refer to:

- Astronomische Vereinigung Kärntens
- Antivitamin K drugs or vitamin K antagonists
- Kotava language, ISO code "avk"
- AVK Holding global manufacturer of valves
