= Vereinigung =

Vereinigung may refer to:

- Astronomische Vereinigung Kärntens, the Carinthian Astronomical Association
- Deutsche Vereinigung des Gas- und Wasserfaches, the German association for gas and water
- Flugwissenschaftliche Vereinigung Aachen, Flight Research Association Aachen
- Hochkirchliche Vereinigung Augsburgischen Bekenntnisses, High Church Union of the Augsburg Confession
- The Internationale Hegel-Vereinigung, International Hegel Association
- Vereinigung der Buchantiquare und Kupferstichhändler in der Schweiz, the antiquarian booksellers association of Switzerland
