= Suzette Tarri =

English comedian and singer (1881–1955)

- Born: Ada Barbara Harriett Tarry; 2 January 1881; Hoxton, London, England
- Died: 10 October 1955 (aged 74); Southgate, London, England
- Occupations: Comedian, singer
- Years active: 1890s–1954

Ada Barbara Harriett Tarry (2 January 1881 – 10 October 1955), known by her stage name Suzette Tarri, was an English comedian and singer, popular on radio as well as on stage in the 1930s and 1940s.

== Biography ==
She was born in Hoxton, London. She performed as a child violinist in the 1890s, and made her first stage appearance as a singer in Walthamstow in 1905. In her early career, she specialised in roles as a theatrical soubrette, singing light comic songs, and by 1913 was regularly accompanied by her husband, the Scottish singer and comic entertainer Tom Copeland. She and Copeland made their first appearance on BBC Radio in 1923. By 1929, her accompanist was David Jenkins, and by the early 1930s they were billed together in radio performances as a "comedy duo". They later married. When Jenkins moved into music publishing, Tarri continued as a solo act, performing in clubs and theatres.

By her mid-fifties, she developed into a successful "character comedienne" – as she was billed in the Radio Times in 1937 – emphasising her Cockney background, and typically taking on the persona of an earthy, harassed and gossiping working-class charwoman or waitress, often called "Our Ada". Much of her material was drawn from overheard real life conversations. In 1938, she made her first television appearance, on the BBC Television show Variety. She was sometimes billed as "Radio's Own Comedienne", and it was claimed that her comic talents, which in fact had developed over several decades, had been "discovered" by the radio producer Ernest Longstaffe. She also made recordings, some with Harry Hemsley, and joined touring shows managed by Jack Hylton. She continued to end her onstage appearances with a 'straight' performance of her signature song, "Red Sails in the Sunset".

She remained a popular performer on stage and on radio during the Second World War. She headlined her own 1939 radio programme, Tarri Awhile, and appeared as a guest on many radio shows such as ITMA during the war, and afterwards. She featured as the character "Mrs Spam" in the 1943 Frank Randle film Somewhere in Civvies, and won the Sunday Chronicle's "Number 1 Comedienne" award in 1945. Academic and former stand-up comedian Oliver Double describes one of her immediate post-war routines about rationing as "an exceptional piece of stand-up. Without any apparent effort, Tarri manipulates the audience's responses like a conductor controlling an orchestra... The routine uses rationed meat as a way of making sexual innuendo to conjure up some grotesque, almost poetic images."

A climax of her career was her appearance on stage at the London Palladium in 1950, in a show starring Danny Kaye. She continued to perform on stage and on radio, in programmes such as Workers' Playtime, in the early 1950s. She also appeared on television in The Good Old Days in 1954. Ken Dodd briefly worked with Tarri on stage at the start of his career in the early 1950s. According to Dodd's producer John Fisher, Tarri's use of a feather duster as a prop in her act was the inspiration for Dodd's tickling stick. She was at one time the president of the Concert Artistes Association.

Her final appearances both on radio and stage came in 1954, by which time she was suffering from cancer. She died in Southgate, London, in 1955, aged 74.
