= Vegas Vanguards =

PWHL ice hockey team in Las Vegas

- City: Paradise, Nevada
- League: PWHL
- Conference: Western
- Founded: 2026
- Home arena: T-Mobile Arena
- Colours: Green and gold
- Owner: Mark Walter Group
- General manager: Dominique DiDia
- Head coach: Kim Weiss
- Captain: Erin Ambrose
- Website: www.thepwhl.com/en/teams/las-vegas

Championships
- Regular season titles: 0
- Walter Cups: 0

The Vegas Vanguards are an upcoming professional ice hockey team based in Las Vegas metropolitan area that will compete in the Professional Women's Hockey League (PWHL). During the league's second round of expansions, it became the fifth expansion franchise announced for the 2026–27 season. The Vanguards will play home games at T-Mobile Arena.

== History ==
=== Founding ===
Despite Las Vegas not having hosted a PWHL Takeover Tour game (making them the first PWHL expansion city to not have previously hosted one), the success of the National Hockey League's Vegas Golden Knights and the resulting increase in youth hockey participation (particularly among girls and women) by 600% and of the Las Vegas market for sports in general led the PWHL to place an expansion team there.

The team's founding and entry into the PWHL was announced on May 13, 2026, as was the Hamilton Havoc, joining the other new teams including the Detroit Clutch and the San Jose Sea Lions. Expansion teams will begin playing in the PWHL during the 2026–27 season.

The team is the league's eleventh franchise overall and its fifth expansion team, part of its second round of expansion. The team will play its games at T-Mobile Arena, which is also the home of the Vegas Golden Knights.

On May 15, the league announced the hiring of Dominique DiDia as the first general manager for the Vegas Vanguards. DiDia previously launched CAA Sports' women’s hockey department, while co-heading the division, which she later led. Their first personnel move was signing Mae Batherson and Kendall Cooper to two-year contracts.

On June 15, PWHL Las Vegas announced DiDia's former Trinity College teammate Kim Weiss as its inaugural head coach. Weiss previously served as the assistant coach on the Trinity College men's hockey program, Maryland Black Bears, and the Colorado Eagles. She also previously served as the head coach of the Washington Pride program.

== Team identity ==
As part of the expansion announcement, the team's colors were revealed to be green and gold; green as an homage to the desert and mountains which surround Las Vegas, gold as a nod to the lavish culture synonymous with Las Vegas and the team identity of the Golden Knights. Like all previous teams, the team temporarily operated as PWHL Las Vegas until the permanent team identity was decided.

On October 8, 2026, Las Vegas released their inaugural season jerseys, which feature the city's name diagonally across the front. The jerseys, like all of the PWHL's, are produced by Bauer.

On November 10, 2026, the Vegas Vanguards name and logo were officially announced. The logo features the kit fox, an adaptable Mojave Desert native that thrives in the face of adversity. The name is inspired by the pioneering spirit that shaped the West, and the typography draws on the American frontier.

== Players and personnel ==
=== Current roster ===
As of July 18, 2026

No.	Nat	Player	Pos	S/G	Age	Acquired	Birthplace
23	(Canada)	Erin Ambrose (C)	D	R	32	2026	Keswick, Ontario
12	(Canada)	Mae Batherson	D	L	25	2026	Garmisch-Partenkirchen, Germany
7	(United States)	Madison Bizal	D	L	26	2026	Elk River, Minnesota
11	(Sweden)	Josefin Bouveng	F	L	25	2026	Uppsala, Sweden
17	(United States)	Kendall Butze	D	L	23	2026	Cleveland, Ohio
4	(Canada)	Kendall Cooper	D	R	24	2026	Oakville, Ontario
67	(United States)	Lacey Eden	F	R	24	2026	Annapolis, Maryland
52	(United States)	Jada Habisch	F	R	24	2026	Buffalo, Minnesota
93	(Canada)	Sydney Healey	F	L	22	2026	Arthur, Ontario
29	(United States)	Nicole Hensley	G	L	32	2026	Lakewood, Colorado
22	(United States)	Tessa Janecke (A)	F	L	22	2026	Orangeville, Illinois
6	(United States)	Katy Knoll	F	R	25	2026	Amherst, New York
15	(Canada)	Darcie Lappan	F	L	25	2026	Kingston, Ontario
71	(United States)	Sydney Langseth	F	R	24	2026	Eden Prairie, Minnesota
92	(Switzerland)	Saskia Maurer	G	L	25	2026	Rothenbach i. Emmental, Switzerland
21	(United States)	Maureen Murphy	F	R	26	2026	Buffalo, New York
24	(Canada)	Alexis Petford	F	R	22	2026	Balgonie, Saskatchewan
16	(United States)	Hayley Scamurra (A)	F	L	31	2026	Buffalo, New York
9	(United States)	Natalie Snodgrass	F	L	27	2026	Eagan, Minnesota

=== First-round draft picks ===
- 2026: Tessa Janecke (3rd overall), Lacey Eden (5th overall)
