= Kendall Cooper =

Canadian ice hockey player (born 2002)

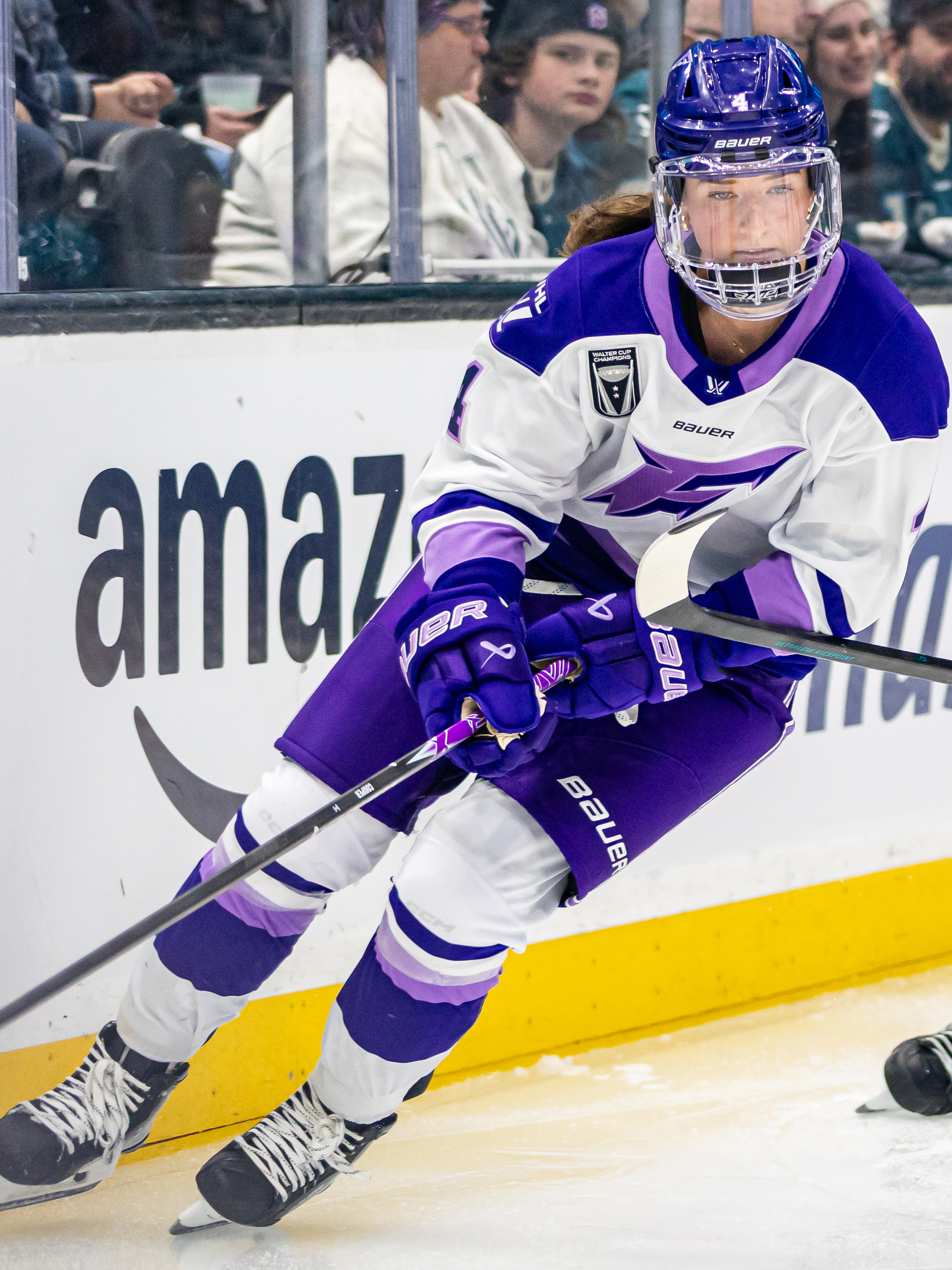
- Cooper with the Minnesota Frost in 2025
- Born: May 19, 2002 (age 24) Burlington, Ontario, Canada
- Height: 5 ft 8 in (173 cm)
- Position: Defender
- Shoots: Right
- PWHL team Former teams: Vegas Vanguards; Minnesota Frost
- National team: Canada
- Playing career: 2020–present

Kendall Cooper (born May 19, 2002) is a Canadian ice hockey player who is a defender for the Vegas Vanguards of the Professional Women's Hockey League (PWHL). She previously played for the Minnesota Frost of the PWHL. She played college ice hockey at Quinnipiac.

== Playing career ==
=== College ===
Cooper began her collegiate career for Quinnipiac during the 2020–21 season, where she recorded four goals and five assists in 14 games. She also scored two game-winning goals, and had 47 shots on goal. Following the season she was named to the ECAC All-Rookie Team.

During the 2021–22 season, in her sophomore year, she recorded five goals and 20 assists in 37 games. She led the team in scoring by a defenceman and ranked third in the conference. Following the season she was named to the ECAC All-Second Team and a finalist for the Defender of the Year.

During the 2022–23 NCAA season, in her junior year, she recorded six goals and 17 assists in 33 games. She led the team in goals and points by a defenceman. Following the season she was named to the ECAC All-Second Team. During the 2023–24 season, in her senior year, she recorded a career-high 11 goals and 22 assists in 37 games. She ranked second among defenceman on the team in assists (22) and points (33). During conference play she ranked fifth among ECAC defenceman in points while also blocking 51 shots. Following the she was named to the ECAC All-Third Team.

On July 17, 2024, Cooper was named captain for the 2024–25 season. As a graduate student, she recorded seven goals and 19 assists in 37 games. Following the season she was named to the ECAC All-Second Team and All-USCHO Third Team. She was also named the Wayne Dean Sportsmanship Award winner. She finished her collegiate career with 33 goals and 83 assists in 158 games. Her 116 points rank fourth all-time in program history, and are the most by a defenceman.

=== Professional ===
On June 24, 2025, Cooper was drafted sixth overall by the Minnesota Frost in the 2025 PWHL Draft. On July 9, 2025, she signed a two-year contract with the Frost. During the 2025–26 season, in her rookie year, she recorded two goals and 17 assists in 30 regular season games.

During the league's expansion to 12 teams ahead of the 2026–27 season, she was left unprotected by the Frost and signed a two-year contract with the Vegas Vanguards on June 6, 2026. She was one of the first players signed by the team, alongside Mae Batherson.

== International play ==
Medal record

Representing Canada

Ice hockey

World Championships
Silver medal – second place	2026 Denmark	

World U18 Championship
Gold medal – first place	2019 Japan	
Silver medal – second place	2020 Slovakia	

Cooper represented Canada at the 2019 IIHF World Women's U18 Championship where she recorded two assists in five games and won a gold medal. She again represented Canada at the 2020 IIHF World Women's U18 Championship where she served as captain and recorded one goal in five games and won a silver medal.

She is making her senior national team debut on the roster for the 2026 IIHF Women's World Championship. In the first game of the tournament, she scored her first goal on the senior national team.

== Career statistics ==
=== Regular season and playoffs ===
			Regular season					Playoffs
Season	Team	League	GP	G	A	Pts	PIM	GP	G	A	Pts	PIM
2020–21	Quinnipiac University	ECAC	14	4	5	9	4	—	—	—	—	—
2021–22	Quinnipiac University	ECAC	37	5	20	25	6	—	—	—	—	—
2022–23	Quinnipiac University	ECAC	33	6	17	23	4	—	—	—	—	—
2023–24	Quinnipiac University	ECAC	37	11	22	33	8	—	—	—	—	—
2024–25	Quinnipiac University	ECAC	37	7	19	26	10	—	—	—	—	—
2025–26	Minnesota Frost	PWHL	30	2	17	19	4	5	0	0	0	0
PWHL totals			30	2	17	19	4	5	0	0	0	0

=== International ===
Year	Team	Event	Result	GP	G	A	Pts	PIM
2019	Canada	U18	1st place, gold medalist(s)	5	0	2	2	4
2020	Canada	U18	2nd place, silver medalist(s)	5	1	0	1	4
Junior totals				10	1	2	3	8

== Awards and honours ==
Honours	Year
College
ECAC All-Rookie Team	2021
ECAC All-Third Team	2022
ECAC All-Second Team	2023
ECAC All-Third Team	2024
ECAC All-Second Team	2025
