= Kim Weiss =

American ice hockey coach (born 1989)

Current position
- Title: Head coach
- Team: Vegas Vanguards
- Record: 0–0–0

Biographical details
- Born: May 11, 1989 (age 37); Potomac, Maryland, U.S.
- Education: Trinity College

Coaching career (HC unless noted)
- 2021–2023: Maryland Black Bears (Assistant)
- 2023–2024: Trinity College (Assistant)
- 2024–2026: Colorado Eagles (Assistant)
- 2026–present: Vegas Vanguards

Kim Weiss (born May 11, 1989) is an American ice hockey coach. She is the current head coach for the Vegas Vanguards of the Professional Women's Hockey League (PWHL).

== Playing career ==
Weiss played college ice hockey at Trinity College, where she was teammates for three years with Dominique DiDia, the inaugural general manager of the Vegas Vanguards. She earned NESCAC All-Conference honors in all four seasons from 2007 to 2011. During her junior year, she helped lead the Bantams to the NCAA Division III women's ice hockey tournament for the first time in program history. During her senior year she was named the NESCAC Player of the Year, and a finalist for the Laura Hurd Award. She finished her career with 62 goals and 46 assists in 101 games, and is the program's all-time leading scorer with 108 points.

== Coaching career ==
On June 21, 2021, Weiss was named an assistant coach for the Maryland Black Bears. She became the first female bench coach in the North American Hockey League. She helped lead the Bears to their first NAHL East Division Championship in 2023.

On September 22, 2023, she joined her alma mater, Trinity College, as an assistant coach for the men's ice hockey team. She became the first full-time female to work as an assistant coach in NCAA Division III men's hockey history.

On August 7, 2024, she was hired as a video coach for the Colorado Eagles of the American Hockey League (AHL). She was promoted to assistant coach on January 16, 2026, and became the second woman in AHL/NHL history to serve as an assistant coach in a full-time role, following Jessica Campbell of the Seattle Kraken.

On June 15, 2026, former Trinity College teammate and Vegas Vanguards General Manager DiDia announced Weiss as her choice for the team's inaugural head coach for the Vegas Vanguards. Weiss is expected to be appointed following her current season with the Colorado Eagles.
