= Concert Artistes' Association =

UK theatre artists benevolent association

The Concert Artistes Association is a UK theatre artists benevolent association founded in 1897.

Association headquarters are in London, known as the Club for Acts and Actors. Its president is Su Pollard. Patrons are Judi Dench, Anita Dobson, Brian May and Gyles Brandreth.

Past patrons include Su Pollard, Barry Cryer and John Moore, Baron Moore of Lower Marsh. Former presidents are listed as:

- Ali Bongo
- Webster Booth
- Owen Brannigan
- Leslie Crowther
- Pamela Cundell
- Anita Dobson
- Cyril Fletcher
- Hubert Gregg
- Roy Hudd
- Hugh Lloyd
- Brian Murphy
- Ruth Madoc
- David Nixon
- Bill Pertwee
- Jimmy Perry
- Cardew 'The Cad' Robinson
- Joan Savage
- Leslie Sarony
- Jack Warner
- Mark Wynter
- Anne Ziegler

Other presidents of the association have included Arthur Askey, Thorpe Bates, Larry Parker, Elsie and Doris Waters, Norman Long, husband and wife act Nan Kenway and Douglas Young, and Suzette Tarri.
