= Jack Beckitt =

English ventriloquist

Jack Beckitt (24 September 1928 – 18 February 2010) was an English ventriloquist known for his "talking shoes" and his dummy Willie Drinkall.

== Biography ==
Beckitt was born John Beckitt, better known as Jack, on 24 September 1928 in Grimsby. His first ventriloquist's dummy was called Kenny Tok, a monocled puppet who wore top hat and tails. Soon after, he won a talent contest at Grimsby's Empire Theatre. He joined a troupe, called the Ragamuffins and expanded his act with two additional dummies, Johnny and Dickie Shorthouse.

By the 1960s, Beckitt had spent his time in national service, and was represented by the Bert Aza agency, where he would perform in variety shows. Beckitt created a talking shoe with a face painted on the sole as a gimmick for his show - which soon increased into multiple shoes. One shoe's character, an alcoholic, became the basis for his most famous dummy, Willie Drinkall.

Drinkall was a papier-mâché headed dummy, who would generally be smoking a cigarette, his eyes moved independently, as well as his eyelids and jaw. His arm was long enough to go around Beckitt's neck.

With this new dummy, Beckitt appeared on The Good Old Days, which led to an 8-month booking at London Palladium and a further eight-month booking at the Americana Hotel in Miami, and a period at Sands Hotel in Las Vegas.

Beckitt eventually settled in Gosford, New South Wales, where he died on 18 February 2010. Beckitt had married twice, and had a son and a daughter from his first marriage. He wrote his memoirs, It Shouldn't Happen to a Vent!: A Life in Variety from the Palladium to Las Vegas, which were published in the United Kingdom around 2004.
