= Larry Parker (magician) =

Entertainer

On the bill with his wife to be in Clacton in 1966

Henry Lawrence "Larry" Parker (1929–2021) was a British comedy magician.

He was born into a theatrical family on 17 August 1929 when his parents were playing in Preston, Lancashire. He started in show business at the age of twelve working in his parents' company, the Kinloch Players, touring the Scottish Highlands. After National Service, he became an actor and straight man in summer shows in England. He developed a comedy magic routine which he then used as the basis for shows on television, starting with Happy Go Lucky with Jack Haig on Tyne Tees Television which ran for six years.

He appeared on numerous other television shows including Blue Peter, Crackerjack, The Good Old Days, Jackanory, Magpie, the Royal Variety Performance, Seaside Special and The Sooty Show. He became a member of the Inner Magic Circle and president of the Concert Artistes' Association.

In the 1980s, as venues declined in the UK, he performed across the continent of Europe where his humorously incoherent vocals worked well with an international audience. In the 1990s, he then worked regularly as an entertainer on cruise ships. He retired to Cornwall in 1997 after his wife, comedienne Rowena Vincent, died. He continued to perform in local shows there.
