= Alan Randall (entertainer) =

English musical artist (1934–2005)

- Born: Alan John Randle; 10 June 1934; Bedworth, Warwickshire, England
- Died: 9 April 2005 (aged 70) Nuneaton, Warwickshire, England
- Occupations: Entertainer, singer, musician
- Instruments: Banjo-ukulele, vibraphone, etc.
- Years active: 1950s–c.2000

Alan John Randle (10 June 1934 – 9 April 2005), known professionally as Alan Randall, was an English multi-instrumentalist and entertainer, who became best known for his impersonations of George Formby.

== Biography ==
Born in Bedworth, Warwickshire, he began playing music as a child, and learned both piano and vibraphone. He played many instruments in dance bands in the 1950s, including trumpet, trombone and drums as well as the vibraphone, which became his main instrument and on which he was recognised as one of the leading British exponents. In 1957, he appeared at the Windmill Theatre in London, and was booked to tour the country with emerging pop stars Tommy Steele and, later, Cliff Richard. As a musician and entertainer, he featured regularly in summer shows and pantomimes around Britain.

Randall was a lifelong fan of the Lancashire singer and entertainer George Formby. After Formby's death in 1961, Randall began interspersing his act with performances of Formby's songs, singing and accompanying himself on the ukulele-banjo. His singing voice was naturally similar to Formby's, and the popularity of his Formby songs meant that they increasingly became the focus of his performances. It was said that "his voice was so perfect that even Formby's fiancée, Pat Howson, and members of his family could not tell the difference between Alan and his hero."

He recorded Formby's songs from 1968, and made many radio and television broadcasts. He also toured internationally, appeared in Las Vegas with Perry Como and Liza Minnelli, and was part of the 1986 Royal Variety Performance. He co-wrote a biography of Formby with Ray Seaton in 1974, and appeared in a theatrical show, Turned Out Nice Again, co-written with Vince Powell. He acquired an important collection of Formby memorabilia, including many items given to him by Pat Howson.

He died in Nuneaton in 2005, aged 70, after suffering from motor neurone disease.
