= Mark DiDia =

American music executive (born 1972)

- Born: Edison, New Jersey, U.S.
- Occupations: Disc jockey; entrepreneur; Artist Manager; music executive
- Years active: 1976–present
- Musical career
- Genres: Rock; pop; country
- Labels: Def American; Hollywood Records; Capitol Records; Columbia Records; Island Records; Geffen Records

Mark DiDia is an American music executive and artist advocate with more than four decades of experience in the music industry.

== Early life ==
Raised as the son of an electrician, DiDia developed a strong fascination with radio and broadcasting. With his father’s support, he launched his high school’s radio station—an early entrepreneurial effort that helped shape his career trajectory. This foundational experience set the stage for a lifelong commitment to artist development, advocacy, and leadership within the music business.

DiDia hails from Edison, New Jersey. In 1976, he joined WTSR at The College of New Jersey (then Trenton State College), where he served as program director for three years. During his tenure, he played a key role in expanding the station's operations to a 24-hour format.

== Career ==
DiDia began his career in radio as music director and afternoon DJ at WMGM in Atlantic City. This role led to a position as music director and on-air talent at WYSP in Philadelphia. At WYSP, DiDia created the popular METALSHOP show, which aired on Saturday nights and contributed to the early exposure of several notable artists, including Metallica, Mötley Crüe, and Bon Jovi.

Following his success at WYSP, DiDia was selected by Infinity Broadcasting to help launch WXRK, a new station in New York City,formerly WKTU, rebranded as K-Rock. The station debuted during the weekend of the 1985 Live Aid concert, with DiDia serving as its first on-air host as well as music director. During his time at K-Rock, he introduced audiences to new artists, including the Beastie Boys, and began his long-standing professional relationship with producer Rick Rubin. From 1985 to 1988, DiDia served as music director at K-ROCK before transitioning into the record industry. He joined Geffen Records at the invitation of David Geffen, serving as Head of Rock Promotion. While at Geffen, he worked with artists such as Aerosmith, Guns N' Roses, Whitesnake, and Tesla, under the mentorship of co-founder Eddie Rosenblatt.

Later, DiDia joined Def American (which became American Recordings) as General Manager. There, he helped launch or support the careers of The Black Crowes, Danzig, Andrew Dice Clay, Sir Mix-a-Lot, and Johnny Cash. His leadership contributed to the label's prominence among independent record companies in the early 1990s.

Throughout his career, DiDia has held leadership roles at major music companies including Disney's Hollywood Records and Capitol Records, where he contributed to the success of artists like Radiohead and Coldplay. Coldplay's former manager, Dave Holmes, has credited DiDia for his early support of the band at Capitol. In 2007, DiDia rejoined Rick Rubin at Columbia Records, where he played a key role in signing and promoting Adele's debut album 19.

DiDia has been a senior executive at Red Light Management, one of the largest artist management firms globally. In this role, he continues to support the careers of artists such as The Black Crowes, Counting Crows, 3 Doors Down, and Dirty Honey.

In recent years, DiDia was instrumental in the reunion of The Black Crowes. In 2021, the band launched a 30th anniversary tour for Shake Your Money Maker, which saw sold-out performances around the world. In 2024, under DiDia's guidance, the band released Happiness Bastards, their first studio album in nearly 15 years. The album received critical acclaim and earned a Grammy nomination for Best Rock Album.

In April 2025, DiDia executive produced the 25th anniversary reissue of "Jimmy Page & The Black Crowes live at the Greek" 6LP box set.

Year	Title	Company
1976	Program Director	WTSR Trenton State College/NJ
1980	Music Director/On air talent	WMGM/Atlantic City
1982	Music Director/On air talent	WYSP/Philly
1985	Music Director/On-air talent	K-Rock/NYC
1988	Head of Rock Promotion	Geffen Records
1992	General Manager	Def American (later American Recordings)
1998	EVP/General Manager	Hollywood Records
2001	EVP/General Manager	Capitol Records
2007	EVP/General Manager	Columbia Records
2009	EVP/General Manager	Island Records
2011	Artist Manager	Red Light Management

== Awards ==
=== 41st GRAMMY Awards ===
Year	work	Category	Result	Ref.
1999	They Wanted The Highway	Best Long Form Music Video	Nominated	

== Bands managed ==
- The Black Crowes
- Counting Crows
- 3 Doors Down
- Dirty Honey
