= Civil Aeronautics Administration =

Civil Aeronautics Administration may refer to:

- Civil Aeronautics Administration (Taiwan), now Civil Aviation Administration
- Civil Aeronautics Administration (United States), established in 1938

== See also ==
- Civil aviation authority
