= Civil Aviation Agency Slovenia =

Civil Aviation Agency Slovenia (CAA; Slovene: Javna agencija za civilno letalstvo Republike Slovenije) is the civil aviation authority in Slovenia. Its head office is in Ljubljana.
