= Astronomische Vereinigung Kärntens =

The Carinthian Astronomical Association (CAA – German: Astronomische Vereinigung Kärntens, AVK) Is the second great astronomical association in Austria. The CAA owns two observatories and one planetarium. One observatory is located near Klagenfurt, on the Kreuzbergl, the other on the Gerlitze, near Villach. The planetarium is situated at Klagenfurt near Minimundus.

== History ==
In 1961 the maths teacher Helmut Lenhof from Klagenfurt arranged a trip to the solar eclipse in the Apennine Mountains. Some of the participants became the core of the CAA.

Still in the same year on 17 June the "Vereinigung der Sternfreunde" was founded. One of its objectives was to build a public observatory.

The city of Klagenfurt provided the old tower on the Kreuzbergl, which was built in 1895 for the visit of Kaiser Franz Josef I, to transform it in an observatory. Proximately it was revealed that another group of amateur astronomers from the Highschool of Klagenfurt has had also the idea to build an observatory. As a result, these two groups were united.

To construct and fund the observatory the "Verein zu Errichtung einer Volkssternwarte am Kreuzbergl" was founded. This association was dissolved after the inauguration in September 1965 and the observatory became property of the "Vereinigung der Sternfreunde".

The university of Graz lend the CAA a refracting telescope with an aperture of 134mm and a focal length of 2000mm. This telescope was replaced by another refracting telescope from the company Wachter.

Eight years later the CAA got the chance to make observations from the Gerlitzen. In 1997 the observatory was modernized, and the old telescope was replaced by a Ritchey-Chrétien telescope. Today this telescope is also used for astrophotography.

== The planetarium ==
In the same year of the modernization of the Gerlitzen observatory, the planetarium was inaugurated too. Already after the construction of the Kreuzbergl observatory the CAA wanted to have a planetarium. Therefore, the city of Klagenfurt provided an estate near the city at the Wörthersee. The entire construction cost about €900,000 ($1,300,000) and was supported by donors.

Nowadays the planetarium works together with Minimundus and offers nearly 2.000 presentations a year with about 40.000 visitors.

== See also ==
- List of astronomical societies
