= List of Danger Mouse home video releases =

The list of Danger Mouse home video releases is a list of home video releases of the 1981 television series Danger Mouse and its 2015 reboot.

== United Kingdom ==
=== 1981 series ===
FremantleMedia released six Region 0 DVDs in 2001 through 2003, featuring 6-8 random episodes in each set. In September 2006, Fremantle Media released a further six DVDs, making all episodes available on DVD, and a 25th Anniversary 12-Disc DVD box set. Although the box set received mostly positive reviews, some cited the lack of chronological order of the episodes as a disappointment. A 10-disc "30th Anniversary Edition" box set was released on 26 September 2011, with the episodes in original UK broadcast order. All UK box sets contain all 161 episodes, but where some stories originally aired in five-minute segments, they have been edited together to make a total of 89 episodes. It means much of David Jason's 'cliffhanger' narration is not present on the UK DVDs.

DVD title	No of episodes	Release date	Episodes
Close Encounters of the Absurd Kind!	6	5 March 2001	"Custard", "Close Encounters of the Absurd Kind!", "The Duel", "The Day of the Suds", "The Bad Luck Eye of the Little Yellow God", "The Four Tasks of Danger Mouse"; Special features: Biographies, First ever Count Duckula episode "No Sax Please, We're Egyptian!"
Danger Mouse Saves the World... Again!	6	4 June 2001	"The Invasion of Colonel K", "Danger Mouse Saves the World...Again!", "The Odd Ball Runaround", "The Wild, Wild Goose Chase!", "The Return of Count Duckula!", "Demons aren't Dull?!"
Tower of Terror	6	15 October 2001	"150 Million Years Lost", "The Planet of the Cats", "Four Heads are Better Than Two", "Tower of Terror", "The Great Bone Idol", "Public Enemy No. 1"; Special features: Pilot Episode - "The Mystery of the Lost Chord"
Project Moon	8	11 March 2002	"Long Lost Crown Affair", "By George, It's a Dragon!", "Project Moon", "Remote-Controlled Chaos", "Ee-Tea!", "Journey to the Earth's... 'Cor!", "Play it Again, Wufgang!", "The Clock Strikes Back!"; Special features: Original theme tune ideas
Viva Danger Mouse	8	9 September 2002	"Viva Danger Mouse", "Gremlin Alert", "Tut, Tut, It's Not Pharaoh!", "Multiplication Fable", "Lost, Found and Spellbound", "Mechanised Mayhem", "Bandits, Beans and Ballyhoo!", "The Martian Misfit"; Special features: Cast list
Who Stole the Bagpipes?	8	10 March 2003	"Who Stole the Bagpipes?", "Aaaaargh! Spiders!", "The Chicken Run", "Tiptoe Through the Penfolds", "Trouble with Ghosts", "Nero Power", "The Plague of Pyramids", "Alping is Snow Easy Matter"; Special features: Pilot Episode 2 - "The Mystery of the Lost Chord".
Rogue Robots	9	4 September 2006	"Rogue Robots", "The Dream Machine", "Lord of the Bungle", "Die Laughing", "The World of Machines", "Ice Station Camel", "The Strange Case of the Ghost Bus", "Pillow Fright!", "The Trip to America"; Special features: Quiz, Photo gallery
The Spy Who Stayed in with a Cold	9	4 September 2006	"The Next Ice Age Begins at Midnight!", "The Aliens are Coming!", "The Man from Gadget", "Tampering with Time Tickles", "Hear, Hear", "The Spy Who Stayed in with a Cold", "Statues", "Heavy Duty", "One of our Stately Homes is Missing"; Special features: "Where's Penfold?" game", Photo gallery
The Hickory Dickory Dock Dilemma	7	4 September 2006	"Cor! What a Picture!", "The Hickory Dickory Dock Dilemma", "Once Upon a Time Slip", "It's All White, White Wonder!", "What a Three-Point Turn-up for the Book!", "Penfold Transformed!", "The Good, the Bad and the Motionless; Special features: "Can You Drive DM's Car to Safety?!" game", Photo gallery
The Ultra Secret Secret	7	4 September 2006	"Danger Mouse on the Orient Express", "The Ultra Secret Secret", "Duckula Meets Frankenstoat!", "Have You Fled from Any Good Books Lately?", "The Intergalactic 147", "Penfold B.F.", "Where, There's a Well, There's a Way!"; Special features: Interview with Mark Hall (from BBC Inside Out North West), Photo gallery
The Statue of Liberty Caper	8	4 September 2006	'"The Statue of Liberty Caper", "Beware of Mexicans Delivering Milk", "Quark! Quark!", "Afternoon Off with the Fangboner!", "All Fall Down", "Turn of the Tide", "I Spy with My Little Eye...", "Bigfoot Falls"; Special features: Behind the scenes feature (from Splash), Photo gallery
Rhyme and Punishment	7	4 September 2006	"A Dune with a View", "Don Coyote and Sancho Penfold", "Crumhorn Strikes Back!", " Ants, Trees and Whoops-a-Daisy!", "Cat-astrophe", "There's a Penfold in my Suit!", "Rhyme and Punishment"; Special features: Behind the scenes feature (from CB-TV), Photo gallery
Danger Mouse - 25th Anniversary Edition	89	4 September 2006	12 disc set in silver card packaging, containing a Cosgrove Hall brochure and the following DVDs (see above for contents): Rogue Robots; The Spy Who Stayed in with a Cold; The Hickory Dickory Dock Dilemma; The Ultra Secret Secret; The Statue of Liberty Caper; Rhyme and Punishment; Danger Mouse Saves the World... Again!; Close Encounters of the Absurd Kind; The Great Bone Idol (originally released individually under the title Tower Of Terror); Project Moon; Viva Danger Mouse; Who Stole the Bagpipes?
Danger Mouse (The Times promotional DVD)	6	January 2008	"Rogue Robots", "Lord of the Bungle", "Once Upon a Time Slip", "It's All White, White Wonder!", "Quark! Quark!", "Penfold B.F."
Danger Mouse - The Complete Collection	89	26 September 2011	10 disc set available in broadcast order for the first time in the UK: Disc 1 (Season One): "Rogue Robots", "Who Stole the Bagpipes?", "Trouble with Ghosts", "The Chicken Run", "The Martian Misfit", "The Dream Machine", "Lord of the Bungle", "Die Laughing", "The World of Machines", "Ice Station Camel", "A Plague of Pyramids"; Disc 2 (Season Two): "Custard", "Close Encounters of the Absurd Kind", "The Duel", "The Day of the Suds", "The Bad Luck Eye of the Little Yellow God", "The Four Tasks of Danger Mouse"; Disc 3 (Season Three): "The Invasion of Colonel K", "Danger Mouse Saves the World... Again!", "The Odd Ball Runaround", "The Strange Case of the Ghost Bus", "The Trip to America"; Disc 4 (Season Four): "The Wild, Wild, Goose Chase!", "The Return of Count Duckula", "Demons aren't Dull?!", "150 Million Years Lost", "The Planet of the Cats", " Four Heads are Better than Two", "Tower of Terror", "The Great Bone Idol", "Public Enemy No. 1"; Disc 5 (Season Five): "Long Lost Crown Affair", "By George, It's a Dragon!", "Tiptoe Through the Penfolds", "Project Moon", "The Next Ice Age Begins at Midnight!", "The Aliens are Coming!", "Remote-Controlled Chaos", "The Man from Gadget", "Tampering with Time Tickles", "Nero Power"; Disc 6 (Season Six Volume One): "Once Upon a Time Slip", "Viva Danger Mouse", "Play it Again!", "Wufgang!", "Hear, Hear", "Multiplication Fable", "The Spy Who Stayed in with a Cold", "It's All White!, White Wonder!", "The Hickory Dickory Dock Dilemma", "What a Three-Point-Turn-up for the Book!", "Quark! Quark!", "Alping is Snow Easy Matter", "Aaargh!, Spiders!", "One of our Stately Homes is Missing", " Afternoon off with the Fangboner"; Disc 7 (Season Six Volume Two): "Beware of Mexicans Delivering Milk", "Cat-Astrophe", "The Good, the Bad and the Motionless", "Statues", " The Clock Strikes Back!", "Ee-Tea!", "Bandits, Beans and Ballyhoo!", "Have You Fled Any Good Books Lately?", "Tut, Tut, It's Not Pharaoh!", " Lost, Found and Spellbound", "Penfold, B.F.", "Mechanised Mayhem", "Journey to the Earth's... 'Cor!"; Disc 8 (Seasons Seven & Eight): "DM on the Orient Express", "The Ultra Secret Secret", "Duckula Meets Frankenstoat!", "Where There's a Well, There's a Way!", "All Fall Down", "Turn of the Tide", "Gremlin Alert", "Cor! What a Picture!"; Disc 9 (Season Nine): "I Spy with my Little Eye...", "Bigfoot Falls", "The Statue of Liberty Caper", "Penfold Transformed!", "A Dune with a View", "Don Coyote and Sancho Penfold"; Disc 10 (Season Ten): "Crumhorn Strikes Back!", "Ants, Trees and...Whoops-a-Daisy!", "There's a Penfold in my Suit!", "Rhyme and Punishment", "Pillow Fright!", "Heavy Duty", "The Intergalactic 147"; Special features: "Danger Mouse and Friends" (exclusive to this DVD collection and never previously available), Pilot Episode "The Mystery of The Lost Chord", Interviews with Brian Cosgrove and Mark Hall, Exclusive behind-the-scenes footage, Danger Mouse games, Original theme tune ideas, Biographies, Stills galleries, 4 artcards (HMV exclusive only)
Danger Mouse - 35th Anniversary Edition	89	12 September 2016	Disc 1 (Season One): "Rogue Robots", "Who Stole the Bagpipes?", "Trouble with Ghosts", "The Chicken Run", "The Martian Misfit", "The Dream Machine", "Lord of the Bungle", "Die Laughing", "The World of Machines", "Ice Station Camel", "A Plague of Pyramids"; Disc 2 (Season Two): "Custard", "Close Encounters of the Absurd Kind", "The Duel", "The Day of the Suds", "The Bad Luck Eye of the Little Yellow God", "The Four Tasks of Danger Mouse"; Disc 3 (Season Three): "The Invasion of Colonel K", "Danger Mouse Saves the World... Again!", "The Odd Ball Runaround", "The Strange Case of the Ghost Bus", "The Trip to America"; Disc 4 (Season Four): "The Wild, Wild, Goose Chase!", "The Return of Count Duckula", "Demons aren't Dull?!", "150 Million Years Lost", "The Planet of the Cats", " Four Heads are Better than Two", "Tower of Terror", "The Great Bone Idol", "Public Enemy No. 1"; Disc 5 (Season Five): "Long Lost Crown Affair", "By George, It's a Dragon!", "Tiptoe Through the Penfolds", "Project Moon", "The Next Ice Age Begins at Midnight!", "The Aliens are Coming!", "Remote-Controlled Chaos", "The Man from Gadget", "Tampering with Time Tickles", "Nero Power"; Disc 6 (Season Six Volume One): "Once Upon a Time Slip", "Viva Danger Mouse", "Play it Again!", "Wufgang!", "Hear, Hear", "Multiplication Fable", "The Spy Who Stayed in with a Cold", "It's All White!, White Wonder!", "The Hickory Dickory Dock Dilemma", "What a Three-Point-Turn-up for the Book!", "Quark! Quark!", "Alping is Snow Easy Matter", "Aaargh!, Spiders!", "One of our Stately Homes is Missing", " Afternoon off with the Fangboner"; Disc 7 (Season Six Volume Two): "Beware of Mexicans Delivering Milk", "Cat-Astrophe", "The Good, the Bad and the Motionless", "Statues", " The Clock Strikes Back!", "Ee-Tea!", "Bandits, Beans and Ballyhoo!", "Have You Fled Any Good Books Lately?", "Tut, Tut, It's Not Pharaoh!", " Lost, Found and Spellbound", "Penfold, B.F.", "Mechanised Mayhem", "Journey to the Earth's... 'Cor!"; Disc 8 (Seasons Seven & Eight): "DM on the Orient Express", "The Ultra Secret Secret", "Duckula Meets Frankenstoat!", "Where There's a Well, There's a Way!", "All Fall Down", "Turn of the Tide", "Gremlin Alert", "Cor! What a Picture!"; Disc 9 (Season Nine): "I Spy with my Little Eye...", "Bigfoot Falls", "The Statue of Liberty Caper", "Penfold Transformed!", "A Dune with a View", "Don Coyote and Sancho Penfold"; Disc 10 (Season Ten): "Crumhorn Strikes Back!", "Ants, Trees and...Whoops-a-Daisy!", "There's a Penfold in my Suit!", "Rhyme and Punishment", "Pillow Fright!", "Heavy Duty", "The Intergalactic 147"; Special features: "Danger Mouse and Friends", Pilot Episode "The Mystery of The Lost Chord", Interviews with Brian Cosgrove and Mark Hall, Exclusive behind-the-scenes footage, Danger Mouse games, Original theme tune ideas, Biographies, Stills galleries
Danger Mouse - The Complete Collection (Series 1-10)	89	2 September 2024	Disc 1 (Season One): "Rogue Robots", "Who Stole the Bagpipes?", "Trouble with Ghosts", "The Chicken Run", "The Martian Misfit", "The Dream Machine", "Lord of the Bungle", "Die Laughing", "The World of Machines", "Ice Station Camel", "A Plague of Pyramids"; Disc 2 (Season Two): "Custard", "Close Encounters of the Absurd Kind", "The Duel", "The Day of the Suds", "The Bad Luck Eye of the Little Yellow God", "The Four Tasks of Danger Mouse"; Disc 3 (Season Three): "The Invasion of Colonel K", "Danger Mouse Saves the World... Again!", "The Odd Ball Runaround", "The Strange Case of the Ghost Bus", "The Trip to America"; Disc 4 (Season Four): "The Wild, Wild, Goose Chase!", "The Return of Count Duckula", "Demons aren't Dull?!", "150 Million Years Lost", "The Planet of the Cats", " Four Heads are Better than Two", "Tower of Terror", "The Great Bone Idol", "Public Enemy No. 1"; Disc 5 (Season Five): "Long Lost Crown Affair", "By George, It's a Dragon!", "Tiptoe Through the Penfolds", "Project Moon", "The Next Ice Age Begins at Midnight!", "The Aliens are Coming!", "Remote-Controlled Chaos", "The Man from Gadget", "Tampering with Time Tickles", "Nero Power"; Disc 6 (Season Six Volume One): "Once Upon a Time Slip", "Viva Danger Mouse", "Play it Again!", "Wufgang!", "Hear, Hear", "Multiplication Fable", "The Spy Who Stayed in with a Cold", "It's All White!, White Wonder!", "The Hickory Dickory Dock Dilemma", "What a Three-Point-Turn-up for the Book!", "Quark! Quark!", "Alping is Snow Easy Matter", "Aaargh!, Spiders!", "One of our Stately Homes is Missing", " Afternoon off with the Fangboner"; Disc 7 (Season Six Volume Two): "Beware of Mexicans Delivering Milk", "Cat-Astrophe", "The Good, the Bad and the Motionless", "Statues", " The Clock Strikes Back!", "Ee-Tea!", "Bandits, Beans and Ballyhoo!", "Have You Fled Any Good Books Lately?", "Tut, Tut, It's Not Pharaoh!", " Lost, Found and Spellbound", "Penfold, B.F.", "Mechanised Mayhem", "Journey to the Earth's... 'Cor!"; Disc 8 (Seasons Seven & Eight): "DM on the Orient Express", "The Ultra Secret Secret", "Duckula Meets Frankenstoat!", "Where There's a Well, There's a Way!", "All Fall Down", "Turn of the Tide", "Gremlin Alert", "Cor! What a Picture!"; Disc 9 (Season Nine): "I Spy with my Little Eye...", "Bigfoot Falls", "The Statue of Liberty Caper", "Penfold Transformed!", "A Dune with a View", "Don Coyote and Sancho Penfold"; Disc 10 (Season Ten): "Crumhorn Strikes Back!", "Ants, Trees and...Whoops-a-Daisy!", "There's a Penfold in my Suit!", "Rhyme and Punishment", "Pillow Fright!", "Heavy Duty", "The Intergalactic 147"; Special features: "Danger Mouse and Friends", Pilot Episode "The Mystery of The Lost Chord", Interviews with Brian Cosgrove and Mark Hall, Exclusive behind-the-scenes footage, Danger Mouse games, Original theme tune ideas, Biographies, Stills galleries

=== 2015 series ===
DVD title	No of episodes	Release date	Episodes
Mission Improbable	7	2 November 2015	"Danger Mouse Begins Again", "Planet Of The Toilets", "Danger At C-Level", "The Other Day The Earth Stood Still", "Welcome To Danger World" "Big Head Awakens" "Greenfinger"
Quark Games	9	15 August 2016	"Quark Games", "Pink Dawn", "The World Wide Spider", "Jeopardy Mouse", "The Return of Danger K", "Danger Fan", "Big Penfold", "The Unusual Suspects", "The Inventor Preventor"
Merry Christmouse	7	24 October 2016	"The Snowman Cometh", "#Sinister Mouse", "There's No Place Like Greenback", "Happy Boom Day!", "Frankensquawk's Monster", "Escape From Big Head", "Megahurtz Attacks"
The Mouse Awakens	9	6 February 2017	"The Hamster Effect", "The Good, the Baaaaa and the Ugly", "Attack of the Clowns", "Cheesemageddon", "Send in the Clones", "Hail Hydrant", "Wicked Leaks", "Queen of Weevils", "Masters of the Twystyverse".
The Agents Who Saved Summer	10	17 July 2017	"Never Say Clever Again", "Tomorrow Never Comes", "Half the World Is Enough", "Danger Is Forever", "The Spy Who Came in With a Cold", "Agent 58", "Thanks a Minion!", "High School Inedible", "Mousefall", "Mouse Rise"
From Duck to Dawn	8	18 September 2017	"From Duck to Dawn", "The Duckula Show", "Very Important Penfold", "The Cute Shall Inherit the Earth", "All 5 It", "Dream Worrier", "The Confidence Trick", "Sir Danger de Mouse"

== United States ==
Several volumes of episodes were released on VHS by Thorn EMI-HBO Video, in association with Thames Video, during the mid-1980s; these releases included original bumpers which were cut from U.S. airings of the era.

A&E Home Video was previously licensed by Thames, TalkbackTHAMES, FremantleMedia International and FremantleMedia Kids & Family Entertainment to release the original 1980s Danger Mouse to DVD in the United States. They reflect the UK broadcast order and include the original serial format of some stories, retaining David Jason's linking narration. However, the character of Stiletto has his original Italian accent, which was not used in US versions of the series. In the US version, Stiletto spoke in a Cockney accent.

DVD name	No of episodes	Release date	Episodes
The Complete Seasons; 1 & 2	41	31 May 2005	2 disc set containing 17 episodes: Disc 1: "Rogue Robots", "Who Stole the Bagpipes?", "Trouble with Ghosts", "The Chicken Run", "The Martian Misfit", "The Dream Machine", "Lord of the Bungle", "Die Laughing", " The World of Machines", "Ice Station Camel", "A Plague of Pyramids", "Custard", Disc 2: Close Encounters of the Absurd Kind, The Duel, The Day of the Suds, The Bad Luck Eye of the Little Yellow God, The Four Tasks of Danger Mouse; Special features: Pilot Episode 2 - "The Mystery of the Lost Chord"", Character Descriptions
The Complete Seasons; 3 & 4	62	25 October 2005	2 disc set containing 14 episodes: Disc 1: The Invasion of Colonel K, Danger Mouse Saves the World... Again!, The Odd Ball Runaround, "The Strange Case of the Ghost Bus", "The Trip to America", The Wild, Wild, Goose Chase!, The Return of Count Duckula, Demons aren't Dull?! Disc 2: 150 Million Years Lost, The Planet of the Cats, Four Heads are Better than Two, Tower of Terror, The Great Bone Idol, Public Enemy No. 1 Special features: Theme Song Sing-Along, Character Descriptions
The Complete Seasons; 5 & 6	37	28 March 2006	2 disc set containing 37 episodes: Disc 1: "Long Lost Crown Affair", "By George, It's a Dragon!", "Tiptoe Through the Penfolds", "Project Moon", "The Next Ice Age Begins at Midnight!", "The Aliens are Coming!", " Remote-Controlled Chaos", "The Man from Gadget", "Tampering with Time Tickles", "Nero Power", "Once Upon a Time Slip", "Viva Danger Mouse", "Play it Again!", "Wufgang!", "Hear, Hear", "Multiplication Fable", "The Spy Who Stayed in with a Cold", "It's All White!, White Wonder!", "The Hickory Dickory Dock Dilemma", "What a Three-Point-Turn-up for the Book!"; Disc 2: "Quark! Quark!", "Alping is Snow Easy Matter", "Aaargh!, Spiders!", "One of our Stately Homes is Missing", " Afternoon off with the Fangboner", "Beware of Mexicans Delivering Milk", "Cat-Astrophe", "The Good, the Bad and the Motionless", "Statues", " The Clock Strikes Back!", "Ee-Tea!", "Bandits, Beans and Ballyhoo!", "Have You Fled Any Good Books Lately?", "Tut, Tut, It's Not Pharaoh!", " Lost, Found and Spellbound", "Penfold, B.F.", "Mechanized Mayhem", "Journey to the Earth's... 'Cor!"; Special features: Count Duckula episode "One Stormy Night"
The Final Seasons	21	26 September 2006	3 disc set containing 21 episodes: Disc1: "DM on the Orient Express", "The Ultra Secret Secret", "Duckula Meets Frankenstoat!", "Where, There's a Well, There's a Way!", "All Fall Down", "Turn of the Tide", "Gremlin Alert", "Cor! What a Picture!"; Disc 2: "I Spy with my Little Eye...", "Bigfoot Falls", "The Statue of Liberty Caper", "Penfold Transformed!", "A Dune with a View", "Don Coyote and Sancho Penfold"; Disc 3: "Crumhorn Strikes Back!", "Ants, Trees and...Whoops-a-Daisy!", "There's a Penfold in my Suit!", "Rhyme and Punishment", "Pillow Fright!", "Heavy Duty", "The Intergalactic 147"; Special features: Count Duckula episode "Town Hall Terrors", Alternative Danger Mouse Theme Song Options, Danger Mouse Theme Song Karaoke, Character Descriptions
The Complete Series	161	28 August 2007	9 disc set containing the following DVDs (see above for contents): The Complete Seasons 1 & 2; The Complete Seasons 3 & 4; The Complete Seasons 5 & 6; The Final Seasons (renamed The Complete Seasons 7 - 10 for the box set.)

== VHS (United Kingdom) ==
VHS Name	No of episodes	Release date	Episodes
Danger Mouse (VC1047)	4	7 April 1986	Custard, Close Encounters of the Absurd Kind!, The Bad Luck Eye of the Little Yellow God, Trouble With Ghosts
Danger Mouse Saves the World (TV9917)	3	3 November 1986	Who Stole The Bagpipes?, The Odd Ball Runaround, The Return of Count Duckula
Danger Mouse to the Rescue (TV9958)	4	5 October 1987	The Chicken Run, The Four Tasks of Danger Mouse, The Strange Case of the Ghost Bus, The Dream Machine
Children's Favourites: Volume 1 (TV8010)	4	1 February 1988	Once Upon a Timeslip, Multiplication Fable (Compilation VHS with The Wind in the Willows and Alias the Jester)
Danger Mouse on the Orient Express (WP0011)	1	7 November 1988	Danger Mouse on the Orient Express
Children's Favourites: Volume 1 (LL0020)	3	1 May 1989	The Good, The Bad and the Motionless (Compilation VHS with Count Duckula and The Wind in the Willows)
Children's Favourites: Volume 2 (LL0021)	3	1 May 1989	Play it Again Wufgang (Compilation VHS with Count Duckula and The Wind in the Willows)
Danger Mouse - Double Take (LL0030)	2	1 May 1989	All Fall Down, Turn of the Tide
Danger Mouse - Double Bill (LL0031)	2	1 May 1989	The Ultra Secret-Secret, Where There's a Well There's A Way
More Children's Summer Stories	3	5 June 1989	Afternoon Off With the Fangboner (Compilation VHS with Count Duckula and The Wind in the Willows
More Children's Holiday Favourites	3	4 June 1990	Bandits, Beans and Ballyhoo (Compilation VHS with Count Duckula and The Wind in the Willows)
Danger Mouse - Big Time Video (TV8119)	4	4 February 1991	I Spy With My Little Eye, Big Foot Falls, The Statue of Liberty Caper, Penfold Transformed
Cult Kids Classics	8	2001	Danger Mouse Saves the World... Again, The Four Tasks of Danger Mouse (Compilation VHS with Chorlton and the Wheelies, Count Duckula, Jamie and the Magic Torch, Rainbow and Button Moon)
Cult Kids Classics 2	8	5 March 2001	The Wild Wild Goose Chase, 150 Million Years Lost (Compilation VHS with Jamie and the Magic Torch, Chorlton and the Wheelies, Rainbow, Count Duckula and The Sooty Show)
I Love Cult Kids	7	2002	By George It's A Dragon (Compilation VHS with Chorlton and the Wheelies, Count Duckula, Jamie and the Magic Torch, Rainbow, Cockleshell Bay and Button Moon)
Classic Kids Collection	6	2002	Custard (Compilation VHS with Count Duckula, Chorlton and the Wheelies, Button Moon, Jamie and the Magic Torch and Rainbow)
Most Wanted Classic Kids TV	4	2003	Custard (Compilation VHS with Victor and Hugo: Bunglers in Crime, Alias the Jester and Avenger Penguins)
