= The Little Green Man =

British animated television series (1985)

- Genre: Children
- Created by: Matthew Smith
- Written by: Matthew Smith
- Directed by: Matthew Smith
- Voices of: Jon Pertwee
- Country of origin: United Kingdom
- Original language: English
- No. of seasons: 1
- No. of episodes: 13 (2 missing)

Production
- Producer: Matthew Smith
- Production location: UK
- Editor: David Hamilton Jones
- Running time: 10 minutes
- Production companies: Pentagon Motion Pictures; Central Independent Television

Original release
- Network: ITV
- Release: 3 January – 28 March 1985

The Little Green Man is an animated cartoon series released in 1985. It is about a boy called Sydney Keets, nicknamed "Skeets", who befriends the inquisitive, friendly alien Little Green Man, nicknamed "Greenie", when his spaceship lands in Skeets' garden. Bar a few minor instances, such as the family cat, Skeets is the only character able to see Greenie, and along with Greenie's small friend Zoom Zoom, they share a series of fantastical adventures together, each serving to educate Greenie about life on Earth in some way or another.

== Development ==
Created by Matthew Smith, The Little Green Man had originally been read as a story in a 1983 episode of the popular, long-running Thames Television children's series Rainbow. The story, telling of Greenie's first arrival on Earth and meeting Sydney, before heading off back home in the evening sky at the end of the tale, was written by Smith and read by show presenter Geoffrey Hayes. The story proved popular with young viewers and two follow-up tales were soon commissioned for the 1984 series; In the meantime, it was felt that there was enough potential for the characters to have their own series of 15 minute adventures, following on from Cockleshell Bay and Button Moon, which had both received their own series after first appearing as stories in Rainbow.

In mid-1984 a pilot was commissioned, The Visitor from Space (which re-tells the story of Greenie's first landing on Earth as previously told on Rainbow, with very minor modifications), after which Thames, who were up to their annual budget for children's output at the time, passed production of the series over to Central Television, who commissioned twelve episodes to bring the total up to thirteen. Each episode was written by Smith, and narrated by Jon Pertwee. A second series of stories was optioned, but ultimately not commissioned following the internal restructuring of the yearly children's television output by the major ITV regions in 1986.

== Episodes ==
No.	Title	Original release date
1	"The Visitor from Space"	3 January 1985
2	"There's No Fun Like Snow Fun"	10 January 1985
3	"Up, Up and Away"	17 January 1985
4	"Greenie Through the Looking Glass"	24 January 1985
5	"Help for the Duke"	31 January 1985
6	"Monkey Tricks"	7 February 1985
7	"Skeets' Scarf"	14 February 1985
8	"A Trip to the Circus"	21 February 1985
9	"An Adventure in Space"	28 February 1985
10	"A Fishy Tale"	7 March 1985
11	"A Bicycle Made for Three?"	14 March 1985
12	"The Shopping Expedition"	21 March 1985
13	"Skeets' Sandcastle"	28 March 1985

== Broadcast history ==
- United Kingdom - ITV (1985, 1986, 1988), The Children's Channel (1991–1992)
- New Zealand - TV One (1986)
- Australia - Max (1995)
- Brazil - TV Cultura (as part of Glub Glub; 1990–1994)
