= The Reluctant Dragon =

The Reluctant Dragon may refer to:

- "The Reluctant Dragon" (short story), an 1898 children's story by Kenneth Grahame
- The Reluctant Dragon (1941 film), a 1941 Disney film based on the story
- The Reluctant Dragon (1987 film), a 1987 British animated film based on the story
