= The Vampire Strikes Back =

The Vampire Strikes Back may refer to:

- "The Vampire Strikes Back" (Ben 10: Omniverse), a 2014 television episode
- "The Vampire Strikes Back" (Count Duckula), a 1988 television episode
- "The Vampire Strikes Back" (What's New, Scooby-Doo?), a 2003 television episode
- Dráscula: The Vampire Strikes Back, a 1996 graphic adventure game
