= Brian Trueman =

British television presenter (1932–2024)

- Born: Brian Richard Trueman; 16 May 1932; Barton upon Irwell, Lancashire, England
- Died: 1 September 2024 (aged 92); Stockport, Greater Manchester, England
- Occupations: Writer; voice actor
- Years active: 1957–2024
- Spouse: Angela Philpot (m. 1961)
- Children: 2

Brian Richard Trueman (16 May 1932 – 1 September 2024) was an English broadcaster, writer and voice actor. He was known mainly for his work with the animation studio Cosgrove Hall. He wrote and/or narrated children's cartoon series, mostly during the 1970s and 1980s.

== Early life ==
Trueman was born in Barton, Lancashire on 16 May 1932. He attended Stretford Grammar School and one year at the University of Manchester. During national service he served as a second lieutenant in the Royal Army Service Corps.

== Career ==
Trueman's cartoons were originally shown on ITV, in its CITV programming slot. However, he also presented the BBC's children's film quiz Screen Test, taking over from original host Michael Rodd between 1979 and 1983. Prior to taking up a writing career Brian worked for many years on local programming in the North West, from It's Trueman to Granada Reports. He also had a stint hosting Granada's film review show, Cinema, taking over from Michael Parkinson.

In 1951, in his youth, he appeared on stage for the Urmston Amateur Operatic Society (now the Urmston Musical Theatre) in a production of Merrie England, playing the role of Big Ben.

== Death ==
Trueman died following a short illness at Stepping Hill Hospital in Stockport, Greater Manchester, on 1 September 2024, at the age of 92.

== Filmography ==
- SuperTed (not to be confused with Mike Young's character of the same name) — Pilot episode
- Chorlton and the Wheelies
- Jamie and the Magic Torch
- Cockleshell Bay
- The Wind in the Willows — Henchman Weasel, Additional voices
- The Treacle People
- Screen Test
- Alias the Jester
- Danger Mouse — Stiletto Mafiosa, Additional voices
- The Reluctant Dragon
- Count Duckula — Nanny, Additional voices
- A Tale of Two Toads — Writer and voice of Henchman Weasel / various characters
- Victor and Hugo
- Truckers
- Budgie the Little Helicopter
- Thomas the Tank Engine & Friends — Writer (series 6 and 7 only)
