= Urmston Musical Theatre =

Urmston Musical Theatre (UMT) is an amateur theatre company based in Urmston, Greater Manchester, UK.

== History ==
The organisation was formed in 1911 as the Urmston and District Operatic Society, and produced H.M.S. Pinafore at the Urmston Public Hall. In 1947, the name was changed to the Urmston Amateur Operatic Society which remained until it assumed the current name.

Several well-known personalities have been connected with the society, notably the current President, Matthew Kelly, who appeared in the society's 1963 production of The King and I along with Peter Pennington, who became a featured soloist with the Black and White Minstrels. Others include Brian Trueman who appeared in the group's production of Merrie England in 1951, the late Lord Winstanley and Winston Churchill MP, grandson of the wartime leader and son of Randolph Churchill MBE.

In 1958, 1959 and 1960, the society won the Manchester Evening News Prompter's Palm award for their productions of Carousel, Oklahoma! and Magyar Melody respectively. The society has also been nominated in the Manchester Musical Awards on a number of occasions for both overall and individual performances. In 1995, they won the "Best Musical" award for their production of Camelot.

Junior members aged between 8 years and 18 years, in addition to being involved in some of the main shows and pantomimes, have presented a variety of musicals in their own right since 1993 including The Wizard of Oz, Bugsy Malone, Andy Capp, Copperfield, and Dazzle.

In the early 1930s, the theatre almost closed when reserves fell to £3, but for the enthusiasm and dedication of its members and patrons.

== Past presidents and shows ==
Year	President	UMT Society Shows
1994 to present	Matthew Kelly	2013 Aladdin, Modern Musicals, 2012 Sleeping Beauty, A Christmas Carol, 2011 Jack and the Beanstalk, Oliver, 2010 Beauty and the Beast, 2009 Cinderella, My Fair Lady, 2008 Snow White, Fiddler on the Roof; 2007 Aladdin, Calamity Jane; 2006 Babes in the Wood, The King and I; 2005 Jack and the Beanstalk, Annie; 2004 Ali Baba, Magic Musicals; 2003 Dick Whittington, Viva Mexico; 2002 Mother Goose, Pickwick; 2001 Cinderella, Oklahoma; 2000 Snow White, Oliver!; 1999 Jack and the Beanstalk, Me and My Girl; 1998 Puss in Boots, Carousel; 1997 Aladdin, South Pacific; 1996 Goldilocks, Kiss Me Kate; 1995 Dick Whittington, Call Me Madam
1991 to 1993	The Lord Winstanley	1993 Babes in the Wood, Hello, Dolly!; 1992 My Fair Lady
1987 to 1991	W S Churchill Esq	1991 The Arcadians; 1990 Half a Sixpence; 1989 The Merry Widow; 1988 Annie Get Your Gun; 1987 The Sound of Music
1965 to 1986	Mrs R V Royle-Higginson MBE JP	1986 Annie; 1985 Guys & Dolls; 1984 Pickwick; 1983 Brigadoon; 1982 The Pajama Game; 1981 The Quaker Girl; 1980 South Pacific; 1979 Cinderella, No, No, Nanette; 1978 Dick Whittington; 1977 Aladdin, Oklahoma!; 1976 Mame; 1975 My Fair Lady; 1974 Finian's Rainbow; 1973 The Boyfriend; 1972 The Mikado; 1971 Summer Song; 1970 Hello Dolly; 1969 Desert Song; 1968 Oliver!; 1967 Kaleidoscope, Carousel; 1966 Student Prince; 1965 White Horse Inn
1954 to 1964	H Bond Esq	1964 The Merry Widow; 1963 The King and I; 1962 Most Happy Fella; 1961 South Pacific; 1960 Magyar Melody; 1959 Oklahoma!; 1958 Carousel; 1957 Annie Get Your Gun; 1956 Zip Goes A Million; 1955 Bless the Bride; 1954 Goodnight Vienna
1930 to 1953	Sir T Robinson KBE JP	1953 The Geisha; 1952 The Three Graces; 1951 Merrie England; 1950 The Count of Luxembourg; 1949 Les Cloches de Conville; 1948 The Arcadians; 1947 The Vagabond King; 1946 A Country Girl; 1939 No, No, Nanette; 1938 Good Night Vienna; 1937 The Mikado; 1936 The Vagabond King; 1935 Trial by Jury, Pirates of Penzance; 1934 Princess Ida; 1933 The Yeomen of the Guard; 1932 The Gondoliers; 1931 The Mikado; 1930 Primrose
1929	Lady Robinson	1929 The Merchant Prince
1926 to 1928	Councillor S Penlington	1928 La Poupee, Snaporatics Revue; 1927 A Country Girl; 1926 Florodora
1922 to 1925	R L Hattersley Esq JP	1925 Marriage Market; 1924 Iolanthe; 1923 Rebel Maid; 1922 Tom Jones
1921	H C D Scott Esq JP	1921 The Geisha; 1920 The Gondoliers
1920	H Standring Esq	1920 The Mikado
1919	J H Ashton Esq	1919 HMS Pinafore
1911 to 1918	F W Millington Esq	1918 to 1918 Masked Singer, Miscellaneous, Orchestral Concerts and Garden Fetes at "Wibbersley" in conjunction with the local British Red Cross, in aid of the local Auxiliary Military Hospital; 1915 Iolanthe; 1914 The Gondoliers; 1913 The Yeomen of the Guard; 1911 HMS Pinafore
