= Edward Kelsey =

British actor (1930–2019)

- Born: Edward Harry Kelsey; 4 June 1930; Petersfield, Hampshire, England
- Died: 23 April 2019 (aged 88); Birmingham, West Midlands, England
- Occupation: Actor
- Years active: 1958–2019
- Spouse: Birgit Johansson (m. 1955; died 2018)
- Children: 3

Edward Harry Kelsey (4 June 1930 – 23 April 2019) was a British actor. He was best known for voicing the role of Joe Grundy for 34 years in The Archers on BBC Radio 4 and for voicing various other characters on television.

== Early life and career ==
Kelsey was born on 4 June 1930 in Petersfield, Hampshire, and educated at Churcher's College. In 1954, he joined the Radio Drama Company by winning the Carleton Hobbs Bursary He was known for voicing the characters of Colonel K and Baron Silas Greenback in the animated series Danger Mouse produced by Cosgrove Hall. He also appeared on such British television programmes as The Avengers, Softly, Softly, The Saint, Public Eye, Dempsey and Makepeace, Z-Cars, Juliet Bravo, Doctor Who, Minder, Angels, Casualty, The Vicar of Dibley, Reilly, Ace of Spies, Shoestring, Wives and Daughters, Anna of the Five Towns, Campion, The Tripods and EastEnders.

He acted in three Doctor Who stories, as a slave buyer in The Romans, Resno in The Power of the Daleks and Edu in The Creature from the Pit. He voiced Mr. Growbag in Wallace & Gromit: The Curse of the Were-Rabbit (2005), several characters in Cosgrove Hall's Victor and Hugo, The Reluctant Dragon, and The Wind in the Willows (television and film), H.H. Junketbury in The Talking Parcel, Farmer Listener and Forester in The Fool of the World and the Flying Ship and also for the voice of "The Thing" in another Cosgrove Hall production, Truckers, based on a book by Terry Pratchett.

== Death ==
He died of a heart attack on 23 April 2019 in Birmingham, West Midlands. He was 88 years old.

== Filmography ==
Year	Title	Role	Notes
1967	The Gentle Libertine	Papa / Brague	
1987	Crystalstone	Hook	
1988	The Most Dangerous Man in the World	Fendoglu	
1996	Victory	Second Billiard Player	
2005	Wallace & Gromit: The Curse of the Were-Rabbit	Mr. Growbag	Voice (final film role)
