= Victor & Hugo: Bunglers in Crime =

- Title card
- Also known as: Victor & Hugo
- Created by: Brian Cosgrove; Mark Hall
- Based on: Count Duckula by: Brian Cosgrove; Mark Hall
- Written by: Brian Trueman; Jimmy Hibbert
- Directed by: Brian Cosgrove
- Starring: David Jason; Jimmy Hibbert; Brian Trueman (Episodes 1-28 and 30); Edward Kelsey (Episodes 19-20)
- Composers: Dave Roylance; Bob Galvin (1992); Mike Harding (uncredited)
- Country of origin: United Kingdom
- Original language: English
- No. of series: 2
- No. of episodes: 30 (list of episodes)

Production
- Executive producer: John Hambley
- Producers: Brian Cosgrove; Mark Hall
- Running time: 22 minutes
- Production companies: Cosgrove Hall Productions; Thames Television

Original release
- Network: ITV (Children's ITV)
- Release: 6 September 1991 – 29 December 1992

Related
- Count Duckula; Danger Mouse; Avenger Penguins

Victor & Hugo: Bunglers in Crime (also known as Victor & Hugo) is a British crime comedy animated series made by Cosgrove Hall Productions for Thames Television and broadcast on Children's ITV from 6 September 1991 to 29 December 1992. Its eponymous characters were based on the villains Gaston and Pierre from the 1988–1993 series Count Duckula.

Victor & Hugo was Cosgrove Hall's second cel-animated production to be assisted by the Spanish animation studio Alfonso Productions, as well as their last cel-animated project before the collapse of Thames Television (who lost the 1991 ITV regional franchise round to Carlton Television as a result of bidding too low a month after it premiered, and as such, none of its thirty episodes were ever seen more than once in the United Kingdom). However, it was later repeated on television in Germany as well as Cyprus, Gibraltar, Bosnia, Belize and the Falkland Islands on the military television network BFBS (and its former channel SSVC Television).

Unlike most other Thames Television-era Cosgrove Hall series, Victor & Hugo was never released on DVD (except for its first episode, "Panda-Monium", which was released as part of a Cosgrove Hall-based compilation disc called "Most Wanted Classic Kids' TV" by its former distributor, Fremantle International, on 14 April 2003, but as with their other Cosgrove Hall-based DVDs, this is now out of print).

It was also the last Cosgrove Hall show to feature the voices of Brian Trueman and David Jason, and featured guest appearances from many of the company's earlier characters, including Danger Mouse, Count Duckula, Soames and Potson, and even Damson Bunhandler (a pig newscaster from two episodes of Danger Mouse, who started three episodes with reports about the brothers' most recent crimes).

== History ==
Victor and Hugo were based on the two five-time villains of Gaston and Pierre from Count Duckula; while Gaston was a tall, thin black stork, and Pierre a stubby, short parakeet, both Victor and Hugo were humans, but they lived in a world populated by anthropomorphic animals (possibly to allow for guest appearances from other, non-human Cosgrove Hall characters). Many of the actions and phrases first used for Gaston and Pierre were reused for Victor and Hugo, such as Gaston shoving Pierre's beret in his mouth to keep him quiet, "Why is it that it is?", "Yes, but mainly no!", and "It is your fault, it is all your fault, it is always your fault!".

Additional characters (such as Interpol the parrot, Ernst Underfelt, Monsieur Meccaneaux and the Hobbes-Sutclyffe family) were created specifically for this show; the character of Wyatt Eartle in the fourth episode "Cowboys and Indiscipline" is also a parody of Wyatt Earp (and a reference to the fact that he is a turtle) while the character of Achilles Marrot in the thirteenth episode "Blunder on the Orient Express" is a parody of Hercule Poirot (the episode's name is also a spoof of Murder on the Orient Express).

=== Premise ===
The series centred on the exploits of two bumbling French criminal brothers, who were the eponymous Victor and Hugo; despite referencing the French author Victor Hugo in their names, both brothers were not particularly intelligent (but Victor was the more intelligent). The plot of every episode focused on Victor, Hugo, Interpol (their parrot), and their English-based business "Naughtiness International" getting hired by criminal figures to steal something - and Victor would come up with a "meticulous plan" to achieve this goal, which was routinely botched by Hugo. Most episodes usually ended with the brothers imprisoned (but others, including the first and last, did not).

== Main characters ==
=== Victor ===
The taller of the brothers, Victor was also clearly the leader for Naughtiness International; his two most striking characteristics were his fedora hat and his manicured moustache (the latter enabling him to appear suave, and also making him resemble a spiv). He also wore a pair of white gloves, which had been given to him for his birthday by Interpol (as referenced in the tenth episode "Scout's Dishonour", which was also the fourth episode he was seen without them) - and his English was significantly better than Hugo's, although he was continuously at risk of making spoonerisms. Despite his constant raging at Hugo, Victor did show on multiple occasions that he secretly cared deeply about his brother (like in the ninth episode, "Dummy Run", in which he was worried that Hugo had been frozen to death when he opened his suitcase and found Gary Gaingridge's dummy, Gaston, inside); he was voiced by Jimmy Hibbert.

=== Hugo ===
Victor's younger brother, Hugo always wore a beret and actually looked like a burglar, right down to his ever-present eye-mask; he was always subservient to "My Victor" and was often the butt of slapstick comedy (he also had a pet earwig named Penelope who he kept in a matchbox but Interpol did not like her and she felt the same way about him). While his intelligence (and English skills) were notably inferior to those of Victor, Hugo was often able to make sense of his brother's spoonerisms - and he would often describe their chosen profession as "criminiminals". Despite the notable handicap of a lack of ability, he also always had the job of driving the van; Hugo's voice, like that of Pierre from Count Duckula, bore a striking resemblance to that used by Peter Sellers for the Goon Show character Bluebottle, and the two characters often made similar exclamations. He was voiced by David Jason.

=== Interpol the Parrot ===
A cynical East End Multicolour (which is a very rare breed of parrot), Interpol lived in Victor and Hugo's van, and provided a voice of reason in rapid-fire Cockney English; it is not saying very much to comment that Interpol was by far the most intelligent member of the group. Aside from residing in the van constantly, Interpol was also able to function as a telephone - he would ring when sat on his perch, and his beak was put to the person's ear. Victor also used him to dial out by pressing his talons like a keypad; in one episode, Hugo used him as a makeshift pair of scissors. He was also voiced by David Jason, but had no dialogue for the episode "Treasure Haunt".

=== The Wretched Dog ===
A small dog played a very important role in most episodes; at various points, often when the plot appeared to be flagging, the dog would run up one of Victor's trouser legs, remove his boxer shorts and run off with them down his other leg. This running gag also appeared at the end of most episodes (prefaced by the statement by a glum Victor that "At least in here, nothing else can possibly go wrong!") - and Hugo particularly enjoyed the dog's appearances, often muttering "good doggie!". In production material from the now-demolished Cosgrove Hall studio, the dog's name is given as Baskerville (as in the Sherlock Holmes tale The Hound of the Baskervilles), although, he was never referred to as such on screen; one episode that he is known never to appear in is the eighth one, "The Case of the Vose Vase", but he also does not appear in the eleventh episode, "Escort Red-Handed" (which was the first to feature Hawkeye Soames and Dr. Potson).

=== Monsieur Meccaneaux ===
Despite his French name, M. Meccaneaux was a working-class accented English rat who was frequently called by the brothers to repair the van (generally after Hugo's bad driving had caused an accident), and on occasion, to provide other forms of technical expertise such as the construction of the Concrete Destruction Ray (known by Victor as the "Discreet Correction Ray"); he was also voiced by David Jason.

== Episode list ==
=== Series 1 (1991) ===
All thirteen of the first series' episodes were screened on ITV as part of the Children's ITV strand on Fridays at 4:05pm; however, on 4 and 11 October 1991, the Children's ITV strand started at the later time of 4:35pm as a result of ITV's rugby coverage on those two days and Anglia Television's Knightmare, which was into its fifth series by this time, was the first programme of the day, so the fifth episode "Hyp-Not-Isn't" was not seen until 18 October.

No. overall	No. in series	Title	Storyboarded by	Written by	Animation direction by	Original release date
1	1	"Panda-Monium"	Jaime Diaz Studios	Brian Trueman	Willard Kitchen, John Offord	6 September 1991
The brothers have been hired by Mr. X to steal the rare African tree panda from Regent's Park Zoo, but they first steal a toy panda from Bumbley's (a pun on Hamley's) toy store and rip its stuffing out so Hugo can get into the skin and take the place of the real panda.
2	2	"Spacial Event"	José Maria Zumel, Ricardo Machuca, Mariano Rueda	Brian Trueman	Carlos Alfonso	13 September 1991
The brothers are initially hired by Ernst Underfelt (a cat) to steal the Space Shuttle from Cape Canaveral, but when Underfelt's secretary later calls them on Interpol and tells them to abandon the theft, they do not receive the message, so accidentally get blasted into space and crash-land on the Planet Dribulon, whose inhabitants almost get them to sell the Shuttle for soap bars and bath crystals.
3	3	"Water Boobies"	Keith Scoble	Brian Trueman	Carlos Alfonso	20 September 1991
After watching a news report from Alex McBackpack about a pirate galleon that sank near the Isle of Lucy off the Azores in 1486, the brothers travel there for themselves with an inflatable boat named "The Tub"; after adding a compressed air capsule to it to increase it to full size, Victor initially goes diving for the sunken treasure in a scuba diving suit but does not succeed, so Hugo tries it instead in a deep-sea diving one (but when Victor becomes tired while operating the air pump, he accidentally turns its handle the other way and ends up shrinking Hugo). However, after Hugo is returned to his original size, both brothers initially appear to have found the treasure after Hugo's suit gets burst by a seagull - but it is then revealed that they actually landed in a giant claw machine. Edward Kelsey is also credited at the end of this episode, but he did not actually appear, in direct contrast to "French Exchange" the following year.
4	4	"Cowboys and Indiscipline"	Jaime Diaz Studios	Jimmy Hibbert	Jean Flynn	27 September 1991
After a failed hold-up at a drive-in movie theatre, the brothers hitch a train ride to Tombstone, Arizona (by driving on the railway tracks), where they drive local bandit Black Jake mad with animal impressions and make a new "friend" in the form of the town's Marshal, Wyatt Eartle; however, after Eartle catches Hugo trying to smash down the door of the Fasbucz Bank with a hammer, he throws him in jail, so Victor hires a horse to break him out. They then try to blow up the bank's safe with dynamite they bought from the general store, but do not notice that it is about to explode until it is too late, so they get blown through its roof and both of them end up back in jail.
5	5	"Hyp-Not-Isn't"	Jaime Diaz Studios	Brian Trueman	Jean Flynn	18 October 1991
After checking a book on hypnotism out of a library without a library card, Victor tries to hypnotise Hugo into being a better criminal, but it does not go to plan when he sneezes while hypnotising him, and it becomes the cue to set him off; after failing to break into the Bank of England, he consults the book for a cure and hits Hugo over the head with Interpol, but the effects are transferred to Interpol.
6	6	"Automanic Transmission"	Jaime Diaz Studios	Jimmy Hibbert	John Offord	25 October 1991
The brothers are hired by Mr. Stootly (a tiger) to steal a voice-activated futuristic car called the "Buillac S230" (whose name is a merger of Buick and Cadillac); after masquerading as roofers to get into the Buillac factory, they tell the S230 to drive to the Stootly Corp. one and get pursued there by the Arizona police, but do not tell it to stop quickly enough, so it crashes into the side of the factory. When Mr. Stootly comes out to investigate the damage, he denies all connection with the brothers, so they are sent to jail.
7	7	"The Hole Truth and Nothing But the Truth"	TBA	Unknown	TBA	1 November 1991
The brothers attend the Hampstead Aesthetics and Art Appreciation Association's fancy-dress ball in the costumes of convicts, where they go down to the cellar and drill through its wall (intending to tunnel into the National Bank of Ruritania next door); however, they make a wrong turning, and end up tunnelling into the cell of Strangler (a melancholy ape) in the Hampstead Prison instead. They then make several attempts to escape from the prison, but none of them succeed until M. Meccaneaux brings them an escape cake and they construct a bicycle from the parts in it - however, when the earth gives way beneath their machine and they crash through the roof of an Underground train, the ticket collector at the next station does not believe their story even though it is true, so they are returned to the prison.
8	8	"The Case of the Vose Vase"	TBA	Unknown	TBA	8 November 1991
The brothers have been hired by Sir Anthony to masquerade as a butler and a maid (Hugo going under the name "Hugette") to steal the Vose Vase from Hobbes-Sutclyffe Hall; Lord Hobbes-Sutclyffe, his nephew Piers Flimsy and his friend Bowler (a lion) also take a liking to Hugo in his "Hugette" get-up, but after a disastrous dinner, Bowler discovers he is really "Hugo", so both brothers are chased away from the Hall by Lord Hobbes-Sutclyffe with his elephant gun. This is also the first of two episodes which does not feature the Wretched Dog.
9	9	"Dummy Run"	Jaime Diaz Studios	Brian Trueman	Carlos Alfonso	15 November 1991
After breaking into a police station and stealing all its handcuffs, the brothers make a quick escape to the Island of Formaggio, where Victor's suitcase is mistakenly claimed by a crooked ventriloquist named Gary Gaingridge, and Victor thinks his brother has been frozen to death when he opens his suitcase and finds Gaingridge's dummy, Gaston, inside; however, Gaingridge is trying to take Hugo's head off because of the diamonds that are hidden in the dummy, and when hotel cleaner Miss Ricotta witnesses him doing this, she tells the local police officer, Inspector Mozzarella (who eventually arrests Gaingridge and his accomplice for attempted murder and diamond smuggling).
10	10	"Scout's Dishonour"	TBA	Unknown	TBA	22 November 1991
After a long pursuit by the police for driving on the wrong side of the road (and eventually getting stopped by the hook of a crane on a construction site), the brothers join the Third East Crummelton Scout Group in order to gain free access to Ackroyd Towers (a house they have been hired by Mr. E to steal from); after several initiation tests, Sir Percival Ackroyd warns the scoutmaster that the police told him to be on the lookout for the brothers and the scoutmaster reveals that he inadvertently recruited them into the scout group, so when they are discovered masquerading as a tree that the Ackroyds' three guard dogs had been barking at, they are chased away from the house.
11	11	"Escort Red-Handed"	José Maria Zumel, Ricardo Machuca, Mariano Rueda	Brian Trueman	Carlos Alfonso	29 November 1991
After the brothers fail to blow the safe at the Bank Cupidité (and escape through Miss Co-Co next door), Hugo poses as a waitress (going under the name "Fifi") and a shortsighted American millionaire named Ulysses P. Broomhandle asks him to marry him; when Hugo learns that Broomhandle's latest invention is a patent earwig trap, he refuses to marry him and is propelled out of his car after he brakes, getting amnesia when he crash-lands on his head (leading him to believe he really is "Fifi"), and later becoming a downstairs maid to the three-time Count Duckula antagonists Hawkeye Soames and Doctor Potson (in this show, Soames is voiced by Brian Trueman as Jack May did not return to reprise his older roles, and both he and Potson are differently coloured to how they originally appeared in the Eighties). This is also the second of the two episodes which does not feature the Wretched Dog at all, the other being "The Case of the Vose Vase".
12	12	"Private Ears"	Vince James	Brian Trueman	Carlos Alfonso	6 December 1991
The Countess of Gazania and her butler Mildew hire the brothers to plant "listening devices" at the Gazanian Embassy; however, what they do not know is that the Gazanian Ambassador is in fact the Countess's husband (and she put him on a diet three weeks ago). After several failed attempts to infiltrate the Embassy, Victor sends for M. Meccaneaux, who suggests that he put Hugo in a box labelled "Do Not Open Until Tomorrow" and deliver it to the Embassy - and when Victor later returns to the Countess with his listening device and Hugo retells everything he heard while in the box in the Ambassador's office, she learns that her husband has secretly been scoffing chocky biscuits.
13	13	"Blunder on the Orient Express"	José Maria Zumel, Ricardo Machuca, Mariano Rueda	Jimmy Hibbert	Carlos Alfonso	13 December 1991
The brothers retell how they ended up marooned in a Venetian punt through their attempt to stow away on, and hold up, the Orient Express (during which the well-known amateur detective, Achilles Marrot, accused them of a jewel robbery that they did not commit) in flashback.

=== Series 2 (1992) ===
The first fifteen episodes of the second series were, for a second time, screened on ITV on Fridays as part of the Children's ITV strand at 4:05pm; however, the sixteenth and penultimate one was screened six days after the fifteenth one on Christmas Eve 1992 (which was Thames Television's penultimate Thursday), and the seventeenth and final one was screened five days later on Thames' final ever Tuesday.

No. overall	No. in series	Title	Storyboarded by	Written by	Animation direction by	Original release date
14	1	"Acting the Goat"	Vince James, Stephen Simpson	Jimmy Hibbert	John Offord	11 September 1992
The brothers are hired by the actor Clint Crag to steal a ring from his fiancée, the famous actress Wanda Nicetime, who is starring in a play named "Grande Hotel" at the Dreary Lane (a pun on Drury Lane) Theatre; after they infiltrate the theatre by stowing away inside a laundry hamper (but they had initially intended to infiltrate the real Grande Hotel, where Nicetime was staying, in this manner), they end up becoming part of the play themselves as replacement can-can dancers and literally bring the house down, so they are sent to jail.
15	2	"Artful Dodgers"	Jaime Diaz Studios	Jimmy Hibbert	Willard Kitchen, John Offord	18 September 1992
The brothers pose as art dealers to the very, very wealthy and are hired by P. Ellsworth Belmont to steal a painting by Belvedere Beaton from New York's Museum of Modern Art (while being tailed by Tom Trowel, a pig); after Hugo stuffs the painting under his sweatshirt, both brothers pass themselves off as Spanish bullfighters to Trowel, but Hugo is too big to fit through the exit so they try to carry it out of the window (however, they are on the seventeenth floor, so they cannot). After they are discovered, they flee the Museum, but run into local police officers Captain Codeine and Louis (whose patrol car they had disabled earlier on in the episode) so are sent to jail.
16	3	"Is There a Doctor in the House?"	Stephen Simpson	Jimmy Hibbert	Jean Flynn	25 September 1992
After crashing through the front of an antiques store, the brothers disguise themselves as doctors in order to steal a top-secret growth formula (which was discovered by Dr. Peveril Peak, and Professor Y has hired them to steal it) from Saint Spooner's Hospital; after they get high on laughing gas, they try to pick the already-unlocked lock of Dr. Peak's laboratory, and when Dr. Peak himself shows up to lock it, he gives his formula to Hugo to hold. Both brothers then make a run for it, but they run into a pair of police officers who had shown up at the antiques store earlier (the formula also smashes over Hugo), so they are sent to jail, where Hugo grows to a huge size.
17	4	"Woof and Tumble"	TBA	Brian Trueman	TBA	2 October 1992
Mr. Big (a mouse in an inflatable suit) and his accomplice Lenny hire the brothers to take care of Mr. Big's dog, Caesar, while they go on holiday; however, things take a turn for the worse after Caesar falls in love with a cow, and ends up being kidnapped by Harry and Nuzzles of "Grab-A-Dog International". But when the brothers cough up the ransom (which is a complete set of Gooey Muncho Bars' Famous Criminals of the World labels), it turns out that Caesar does not want to leave, as he has befriended another dog and is playing cards in Grab-A-Dog's back room with him, so they decide to cough up with another ransom for the other dog (which is a complete set of Yuk-Yuk Lollipops' Yugoslavian Parking Meters of the 1950s wrappers that Hugo had been wanting to swap for an "I ♥ Earwigs" bumper sticker), and when the other dog shows himself, it turns out to be the Wretched Dog, who runs up Victor's trouser leg and steals his boxer shorts.
18	5	"Treasure Haunt"	TBA	Jimmy Hibbert	TBA	9 October 1992
The brothers sell Hobbes-Sutclyffe Hall to "a big lady who has her arm in a sling" (Nanny from Count Duckula, who reappeared in this episode with Duckula himself and Igor) for a map that shows them where they can find the hidden treasure of Sir Pelham Hobbes-Sutclyffe; they initially intend to masquerade as DWP men to effect access to the Hall, but the Hobbes-Sutclyffes' butler Ponsford takes them to be musicians instead (however, they are exposed as frauds when the real musicians show up, and thrown out of the Hall). Victor then has the idea that they disguise themselves as ghosts to frighten the Hobbes-Sutclyffes away - however, both Duckula and Nanny (who are trying to get their map back) and Lord Hobbes-Sutclyffe and Piers Flimsy have the same idea to frighten the other two pairs away, and they are all eventually frightened away by the Hall's real ghosts, Angus and Jeremy, when Lord Hobbes-Sutclyffe blasts a hole in its ceiling with his elephant gun. In this episode, Igor had no dialogue, but it was explained away by Nanny telling Duckula he was fed up of his adventures.
19	6	"Tempers Fugit"	TBA	Jimmy Hibbert	TBA	16 October 1992
The horologist Maximilian J. Millennium and his butler Watt hire the brothers to masquerade as security men (from "Swagard") and steal a very special clock which can transport people through time for him; however, when they return to his mansion, they accidentally break it (and when trying to repair it, press its button, transporting them to the times of Robin Hood, Queen Boadicea, and the fictional aristocrat Sir Percy de Coverlet, before returning to the present). When Millennium comes out to investigate the commotion, Victor tells Hugo to give him the clock - but he ends up pressing its button himself and disappears. Edward Kelsey again guest-stars in this episode.
20	7	"French Exchange"	Vince James	Brian Trueman	Jean Flynn	23 October 1992
The brothers are hired by Baron Silas Greenback to steal Danger Mouse's Mark III car; both Ernest Penfold and Stiletto Mafioso have gone to stay with their Aunties in America, so Hugo takes the place of Penfold's temporary replacement Henri Blancmange, and Victor takes the place of Stiletto. When Colonel K informs Danger Mouse that Greenback is up to something, both Danger Mouse and Hugo set out in the Mark III, but it breaks down, so Hugo sends for M. Meccaneaux to repair it - and after Victor starts flying the Frog's Head Flyer to the Mark III, Hugo starts flying the Mark III to the Frog's Head Flyer once it has been repaired, but both vehicles end up flying into each other and falling to the ground. Edward Kelsey also once again guest-stars in this episode, but he was not actually credited at the end of it.
21	8	"The Poultry-Geist"	José Solis	Brian Trueman	Jean Flynn	30 October 1992
After getting thrown out of the film "Spookzappers 3" at the Roxy Cinema, the brothers get the idea to pretend that the biggest house in their neighbourhood is haunted, so its residents will leave for the night and allow them to steal all the valuables from it; the biggest house in their neighbourhood also happens to be Castle Duckula, which is now owned by a Wanda Nicetime lookalike. When Victor manages to convince her that her newly-bought house is haunted and she leaves it for the night, the brothers start searching for its valuables, but hear strange rumblings and wailings coming from the marquee in the garden - and when they see it moving by itself, they think the castle really is haunted and retreat to its topmost turret (but the "ghost" turns out to be Nanny, who stayed at the castle after it was sold).
22	9	"Jester Moment"	TBA	Jimmy Hibbert	TBA	6 November 1992
The Lord High Chancellor of Vulgaria (which is a pun on Bulgaria) hires the brothers to steal the country's crown jewels from Prince Coleslaw; after Prince Coleslaw hires them as his new jesters, his old jester tries to assassinate them by dropping a chandelier on them but does not succeed, so tries to fire a cannon at them (however, it gets turned around when he ignites it, so he gets blown through the palace to the jewel room and thwarts their plans, after which he becomes the new Lord High Chancellor and they are sent to the dungeon).
23	10	"Stone Me!"	TBA	Brian Trueman	TBA	13 November 1992
The Countess Amnesia of Megalomania and her butler Kelp hire the brothers to steal the world's most famous diamond, Belshazzar's Bunion, from the British Museum for the insurance money; after they have a fake of it made by forger O. Lagge and swap it with what they believe is the real one at the British Museum, she reveals that she kept the real one all the time, because she knew they would try to steal it.
24	11	"Tinker, Tailor, Soldier, Dolt"	TBA	Jimmy Hibbert	TBA	20 November 1992
After crashing through the roof of the WPB News building (and picking up the reporter of the opening crime, Alistair Fishmark, when they flee it), the brothers manage to get hold of some top-secret plans for the "Concrete Destruction Ray" and masquerade as "Captain Victor" and "General Hugo" to acquire the parts, then get M. Meccaneaux to build it for them; after testing it on a pair of lampposts, they plan to use it to destroy the wall of a bank, but their plans are thwarted by a herd of stampeding elephants who had escaped from a pet store earlier on in the episode, and they are then arrested by the Army for impersonating high-ranking officers and sent to a military prison.
25	12	"Pie in the Sky"	TBA	Brian Trueman	TBA	27 November 1992
After being wrongly accused of stealing a secret weapon from a secret laboratory, the brothers are, after unknowingly ending up with the secret weapon themselves, beamed up to the spaceship Titanic by a group of aliens who, after Victor gives them their briefcase, take him to meet their leader (a toe); however, they anger them by speaking their leader's name and are transformed into a painting, then have the secret weapon (which is a custard pie ray developed by the Zosmians) used against them. When the Zosmians themselves show up, a war of custard pie-flinging ensues - and when the brothers are transformed back into humans and make good their escape, they drive their van out of the spaceship and crash-land back on Earth, where the Wretched Dog runs up Hugo's trouser leg (in the van) for the only time.
26	13	"Unstable Fable"	TBA	Brian Trueman	Carlos Alfonso	4 December 1992
The brothers are hired by the penniless aristocrat Lady Grady to steal the world's most famous racehorse, Whizzbangfleetfoot III, so she can win the Sirloin Stakes, and pay off her staff with the £3500000 prize money; they then make several attempts to infiltrate the Mabel Gable Stables, but do not succeed until they disguise themselves as a second horse (going under the name "Bloomin' Old Nag"), and end up beating Whizzbangfleetfoot III in a race. Horse thieves Butch and Slasher witness them doing this and tell Lady Grady, who calls off the theft of Whizzbangfleetfoot III and tells them to steal her the "other horse" instead, but they do not succeed - and the brothers end up becoming part of the Sirloin Stakes themselves and win it after being stung by a bee (however, all they get is a large mouthful of hay).
27	14	"The Hound of the Hobbes-Sutclyffes"	TBA	Jimmy Hibbert	TBA	11 December 1992
After a failed hold-up at Harry's Café, the brothers overhear Ponsford (the Hobbes-Sutclyffes' butler) saying that Lady Hobbes-Sutclyffe thinks she is being haunted by a demon hound, and her husband has agreed to let Hawkeye Soames and Dr. Potson investigate; they then get the idea to masquerade as Soames and Potson in an attempt to rob Hobbes-Sutclyffe Hall, but when the real Soames and Potson show up, the Hobbes-Sutclyffes cannot tell which Soames is the real one, so Victor says whichever one finds the "Hound of the Hobbes-Sutclyffes" must be the real Soames. Although the brothers inadvertently find the Hound after opening the already-unlocked safe in the Hall's library, it turns out to be the Wretched Dog - and when the dynamite they had glued to the safe to blow it explodes, it blasts them out of the Hall.
28	15	"Yule Be Sorry"	TBA	Unknown	TBA	18 December 1992
After having their takings for the "Society of Not Very Good Crooks" charity stolen by a pair of old women who had just donated to them, the brothers travel to New York City and rent a Santa Claus costume (Victor wearing the top half and standing on top of Hugo wearing the bottom half) to steal everyone's presents; after causing a cab driver to crash twice (and Victor getting his beard trapped in a window), police officer O'Dare informs them that they are five months early, so they steal a voice-activated jet to pour fake snow over the city. When they crash-land at the North Pole, they meet the real Santa, who hands them a card saying that he is not really Santa - and when he unzips his suit, he turns out to be a polar bear. However, he hands them another card saying that he is not really a polar bear; when he unzips his suit, he turns out to be none other than the Wretched Dog, who then runs up Victor's trouser leg and steals his boxer shorts.
29	16	"But Me No Butlers"	TBA	Unknown	TBA	24 December 1992
After cutting the guy ropes on their stolen hot-air balloon (with Interpol), crash-landing on a police car and getting their van carried away by an airplane, the brothers again pose as a butler and maid (Hugo again going under the name "Hugette") for Ernst Underfelt; after Hugo breaks the dishwasher, Victor sends for M. Meccaneaux to fix it (and Underfelt's car). Underfelt then orders Hugo to look after his mouse, Damien, while he is attending an Assassins Anonymous meeting, but he accidentally puts him in the dishwasher (which M. Meccaneaux used car parts to repair, so it starts chasing him around the kitchen) - and when Underfelt returns from his meeting coloured white as a result of dishwasher parts being used to repair his car, he sends both brothers to the Grand Canyon. Brian Trueman also does not star in this episode, and it is the only one that does not start with a radio or television report about the brothers' most recent criminal act.
30	17	"Do-In Yourself"	TBA	Unknown	TBA	29 December 1992
In a final attempt to pull off a great crime, the brothers order the Guide to Being a Master Criminal after reading an advertisement for it in the Behemoth newspaper; they then read in that same newspaper that Hawkeye Soames and Dr. Potson have been brought in to guard the jewel room at Osprey (which is a pun on Asprey) Jewellers during the exhibition of the Mardi Ruby, so make several attempts to steal it, but do not succeed until they build an "Easy-Assembly Vacuum-Grabber Crane" and use it to lift up the glass case around the diamond. However, Victor is caught by Soames and Potson (who initially suspected him of being a window cleaner) - and when Hugo comes downstairs, both brothers realise that the button of the vacuum-grabber crane upstairs is no longer being held, so the case drops back down on them.

== Tie-in book series ==
Apart from Thames Video's VHS release of the first, fifth and sixth episodes (which is now almost impossible to find), this show spawned a series of six tie-in books by Jimmy Hibbert, Robin Kingsland and Rod Green, published by HarperCollins Publishers and Boxtree; they featured Cosgrove Hall's short-lived triangular logo on their front covers (which was a reference to Thames Television's final one, introduced in 1990), and entitled "Fu Man's Choo Choo", "The Big Nap", "Out to Lunch", "The Great Golden Turnip Caper", "The Great Train Robbery", and "Where Beagles Dare". The two HarperCollins-published hardback books by Hibbert were also released as audio cassettes, read by Hibbert himself as narrator and Victor, but Peter Sallis filled in for David Jason as Hugo and Interpol on these cassettes.
