= The Reluctant Dragon (1987 film) =

1987 British animated film

- Directed by: Bridget Appleby
- Music by: Mike Harding
- Country of origin: United Kingdom
- Original language: English

Production
- Running time: 30 min.
- Production company: Cosgrove Hall Films

Original release
- Network: ITV
- Release: 31 December 1987

The Reluctant Dragon is a British stop motion animated film created by Cosgrove Hall Films, airing on ITV on New Year's Eve 1987. It is based on the story of the same name by Kenneth Grahame.

== Cast ==
- Robin Bailey - St. George
- Simon Callow - Dragon
- Jimmy Hibbert
- Martin Jarvis - Narrator / Boy / Father
- Edward Kelsey
- Brian Trueman
- Daphne Oxenford - Mother
