= Count Duckula =

British children's TV series, 1988–1993

- Genre: Black comedy; Comedy horror; Dark fantasy
- Created by: Brian Cosgrove; Mark Hall
- Based on: Danger Mouse by: Brian Cosgrove; Mark Hall
- Directed by: Carlos Alfonso; Chris Randall; Keith Scoble
- Voices of: David Jason; Jack May; Brian Trueman; Jimmy Hibbert; Barry Clayton; Ruby Wax
- Narrated by: Barry Clayton
- Opening theme: "Count Duckula" by Mike Harding
- Ending theme: "Count Duckula" by Doreen Edwards
- Composer: Mike Harding
- Country of origin: United Kingdom
- No. of series: 4
- No. of episodes: 65 (list of episodes)

Production
- Executive producer: John Hambley
- Producers: Brian Cosgrove; Mark Hall
- Running time: 22 minutes
- Production companies: Cosgrove Hall Productions; Thames Television

Original release
- Network: ITV; Nickelodeon
- Release: 6 September 1988 – 16 February 1993

Related
- Danger Mouse; Victor & Hugo: Bunglers in Crime

Count Duckula is a British children's animated comedy horror television series created by British studio Cosgrove Hall Productions and produced by Thames Television as a spin-off of Danger Mouse, a series in which an early version of the Count Duckula character was a recurring villain. Count Duckula aired from 6 September 1988 to 16 February 1993 across four series; in all, 65 episodes were made, each about 22 minutes long. The series aired on Nickelodeon in the United States, who billed it as its original programming. All have been released on DVD in the UK, while only the first series has been released in North America.

A new version of the original villainous Count Duckula appeared in the 2015 reboot series of Danger Mouse.

== History ==
Count Duckula was created by British studio Cosgrove Hall Productions as a spin-off from Danger Mouse. In 1984, Nickelodeon acquired the US broadcast rights to Danger Mouse, which became a hit for the channel. After a few years, the Nickelodeon management came to Cosgrove Hall wishing to co-produce a new series. After being shown a number of ideas, the then head of Nickelodeon, Gerry Laybourne, spotted a picture of Count Duckula in Brian Cosgrove's office, and said, "That's the one I want". As the series went into production, one of the writers suggested he become a vegetarian, which added an even sillier concept to the series.

== Plot ==
Castle Duckula, home for many centuries to a dreadful dynasty of vicious vampire ducks – The Counts of Duckula. Legend has it that these 'fowl' beings can be destroyed by a stake through the heart or exposure to sunlight. This does not suffice however, for they may be brought back to life by means of a secret rite that can be performed once a century, when the moon is in the Eighth House of Aquarius... The latest reincarnation did not run according to plan....

— Opening narration

Several episodes explore the theme that each resurrection creates a new incarnation with little to no memory of its past life, the immediate past incarnation referred to as the current's "father". Thus, every incarnation is free to develop its own personality and pursue its own personal interests. The vampire is able to pose as a "dreadful dynasty, the counts of Duckula". The preceding generations included knights, sorcerers, scientists, artists, Egyptologists and even professional gamblers, all of whom are also secretly "vicious vampire ducks".

As the title sequence puts it, "the latest reincarnation did not run according to plan". The successful conclusion of the ritual, which was to be performed "once a century, when the moon is in the 8th house of Aquarius", requires blood, the source of sustenance for any vampire, but Nanny accidentally substitutes ketchup. Consequently, the newest version is not a blood-sucking vampire, but a vegetarian.

The stories often revolve around Duckula's adventures in search of riches and fame, assisted by the castle's ability to teleport around the world. Another regularly occurring theme is the repeated attempt by Igor to turn Duckula into a proper vampire. Some episodes feature Duckula's nemesis Doctor Von Goosewing (based on Dr. Abraham Van Helsing, the nemesis of Dracula), a vampire hunter who blindly refuses to believe the current incarnation of Duckula is harmless. There is also an array of bizarre, often supernatural foes, from zombies to mechanical werewolves. Another feature of the show is a cuckoo clock whose bat-like Borscht Belt comedian styled characters come out and make jokes about the current situation (or corny jokes in general). The clock is also a vital part of the castle's traveling mechanism, and it even has the ability to turn back time.

A series of annuals and monthly comics further detailing the adventures of Count Duckula and associated characters were released throughout the time that the series originally aired and for a short time afterwards.

== Voice cast ==
- Count Duckula, played by David Jason
- Igor, played by Jack May
- Nanny, played by Brian Trueman
- Dr. Von Goosewing, played by Jimmy Hibbert
- Dimitri, played by Trueman
- Sviatoslav, played by Hibbert
- Narrator, played by Barry Clayton
- Various other characters played by Clayton, Hibbert, Jason, May, Trueman and Ruby Wax
- Theme song vocalists were Doreen Edwards and Mike Harding

== Characters ==
=== Count Duckula ===
Count Duckula (David Jason) is a short green duck dressed in typical vampire attire (black dinner jacket, red bow tie, black cape) with black parted hair and speaks with a thick American accent. Unlike traditional vampires, Duckula is a vegetarian, as an unintended consequence of his resurrection ritual being erroneously conducted with tomato ketchup in place of blood. As such, he does not possess the fangs typically associated with vampires, and his favourite food is broccoli sandwiches.

Duckula has a very modern outlook and often despairs over the traditional vampire image he is expected to embody. He hates living in a dark, gloomy castle, and finds the behaviour of his servants to be depressing. Duckula frequently expresses frustration with Igor's attempts to change him back into a proper vampire and his lecturing Duckula as a disgrace and disappointment to the Duckula lineage. Duckula retains some vampiric powers and qualities (such as teleportation and an image invisible to mirrors), but is unharmed by sunlight.

=== Igor ===
Igor is Count Duckula's butler, based on the stock character Igor in the form of a vulture. He greatly dislikes his master's behaviour, and often encourages him to act in a far more ghastly manner. Although he obeys Duckula's orders and genuinely cares for his wellbeing, he remains convinced that, if he could only talk Duckula into biting, maiming, torturing and otherwise brutalising people, he would return to the "good old days" of the previous counts who behaved more like evil vampires.

=== Nanny ===
Nanny is Duckula's nanny and housekeeper. She is an extremely large and clumsy hen with a strong Bristolian accent who inevitably messes up whatever task she is set to do. Nanny has a blind spot regarding doors, and often crashes through a door or into the wall next to it. She affectionately calls Duckula "Duckyboos", much to Igor's annoyance and embarrassment.

=== Dr. Von Goosewing ===
Dr. Von Goosewing is a mad scientist and vampire hunter, a spoof of Abraham Van Helsing. He is a goose who speaks in a German accent, and wears an outfit not unlike that of Sherlock Holmes. He pursues Count Duckula relentlessly, unable to comprehend that he is harmless. Von Goosewing is often maimed by his own inventions and is supremely unobservant, often encountering Duckula without recognizing him.

=== The Crow Brothers ===
The Crow Brothers are four criminally-inclined crows consisting of Ruffles, Burt, Junior, and an unnamed masked crow. They typically scale the walls of Castle Duckula with the aid of climbing equipment, intending to steal the treasure inside, but rarely make it to the top.

=== Gaston and Pierre ===
Gaston and Pierre are a pair of French criminals and occasional villains. Gaston is a tall, thin, black stork, while Pierre is a short, stubby parakeet.

=== Pirate Penguins ===
A ruthless crew of piratical penguins originally hired by Count Duckula, the crew turns on him when his antics crash their ship. All of the penguins are typical pirate stereotypes, one of which is known as Mr. Mate and shouts that he will "bite their heads off!"

=== Narrator ===
The Narrator (Barry Clayton) opens and closes every episode. Episodes usually began with him describing Castle Duckula and its gloomy atmosphere, and close with him saying a phrase popularised in the 1950s and 1960s by American TV horror host John Zacherle, "Goodnight out there ... WHATever you are!". Variants of the Narrator's closing line are also used to close certain programmes.

=== Relatives ===
Duckula has numerous relatives all over the world, who are more classic vampires than Duckula, possessing fangs, red eyes and evil personalities. The relatives include Don Diego, a Spanish vampire duck who makes his fun and games by burning down villages, and Rory McDuckula, a Scottish vampire duck who later makes himself an enemy of Duckula. Another relative, the Archduck Merganser, was a famous Egyptologist.

=== Peasants ===
The town situated below Castle Duckula is home to many peasants who live in constant fear of the count, despite his harmless current incarnation.

=== Towser ===
Towser is a werewolf kept secretly in the dungeons of Castle Duckula. Never seen on-screen, he is sometimes heard howling and growling off-screen.

== Episodes ==
Series	Episodes	Originally released	
Series	Episodes	First released	Last released
1	26	6 September 1988	21 March 1989
2	19	12 September 1989	23 January 1990
3	13	22 October 1990	21 January 1991
4	7	5 January 1993	16 February 1993

== Spin-off ==
In a move mirroring Duckula's adaptation from Danger Mouse, the characters of Gaston and Pierre were reinvented and given a spinoff series as the now-human Victor & Hugo: Bunglers in Crime.

== Home media ==
=== DVD releases ===
The Count Duckula discs are in Region 0, PAL format. The first series was released on Region 1 DVD on 4 October 2005. Series 2, 3, and 4 have, as of 2026, not been released in North America. A Spanish format for Latin America was released.

The entire 65 episodes of the series are set to be released on UK DVD on June 3, 2024. This appears to be the first time ever the whole series have been available on English-language DVDs.

==== Complete set ====
Title	Region 1	Region 2	Region 4
Count Duckula: The Complete Collection	Not yet released in region 1	27 October 2008	1 May 2013

==== Individual series ====
Series	Region 1	Region 2	Region 4
Series 1	4 October 2005 (as "The complete first season")	17 July 2006 (as "The complete first series")	11 October 2007 (as "From Duck Til Dawn", containing the first 18 episodes only)
Series 2	Not yet released in region 1	26 March 2007 (as "The complete second series")	Not yet released in region 4
Series 3 & 4	Not yet released in region 1	3 September 2007 (as "The complete third series")	Not yet released in region 4

==== Individual episodes ====
Title	Region 1	Region 2	Region 4
Count Duckula: Vampire Vacation	Not yet released in region 1	14 October 2002	Not yet released in region 4
Count Duckula: The Vampire Strikes Back!	Not yet released in region 1	11 August 2008	Not yet released in region 4

=== VHS releases ===
During the show's original run, Count Duckula episodes were released on numerous VHS titles from Thames Video collection, often in a different sequence than what was shown in the TV.

VHS title	Release date	Episodes
Count Duckula (TV8036)	7 November 1988	No Sax Please, We're Egyptian, The Mutinous Penguins, One Stormy Night
Count Duckula: The Vampire Strikes Back! (TV8038)	7 November 1988	The Vampire Strikes Back!, Hardluck Hotel, Dear Diary
Count Duckula: A Fright at the Opera (TV8045)	7 November 1988	A Fright at the Opera, Hunchbudgie of Notre Dame, Dr. Goosewing and Mr Duck
Count Duckula: Jungle Duck (TV8050)	24 April 1989	Jungle Duck, Vampire Vacation, Igor's Busy Day
Count Duckula: Autoduck	1 May 1989	Autoduck, Rent a Butler, Mobile Home
Count Duckula: Transylvanian Homesick Blues	1 May 1989	Transylvanian Homesick Blues, Restoration Comedy, All in a Fog
Children's Favourites Vol.1	1 May 1989	The Duck and the Broccoli Stalk (Compilation VHS with Danger Mouse, and The Wind in the Willows)
Children's Favourites Vol.2	1 May 1989	Castle Duckula: Open to the Public (Compilation VHS with Danger Mouse, and The Wind in the Willows)
More Children's Summer Stories (TV8062)	5 June 1989	Down Under Duckula (Compilation VHS with Danger Mouse, and The Wind in the Willows)
The Count Duckula Bumper Special (TV8079)	2 October 1989	Ghostly Gold, Prime Time Duck, The Incredible Shrinking Duck, Ducknapped!, Bloodsucking Bats of the Lower Amazon
Count Duckula: The Ghost of McCastle McDuckula (WP0020)	2 October 1989	The Ghost of McCastle McDuckula
Count Duckula: Mysteries of the Wax Museum (TV8083)	5 February 1990	Mysteries of the Wax Museum, The Lost Valley, Return of the Curse of the Secret of the Mummy's Tomb Frankenduckula's Monster...
More Children's Holiday Favourites (TV8094)	4 June 1990	Beau Duckula (Compilation VHS with Danger Mouse, and The Wind in the Willows)
Count Duckula: The Great Ducktective (TV8102)	10 September 1990	The Great Ducktective, Private Beak, Whodunnit?
Count Duckula: Bombay Duck (TV8103)	10 September 1990	Bombay Duck, Mississippi Duck, Mystery Cruise
Count Duckula: O.O. Duck (TV8105)	10 September 1990	O.O. Duck, A Mountie Always Gets His Duck!, Manhattan Duck
Count Duckula: Bumper Special Volume 2 (TV8113)	10 September 1990	Xmas Quacker, Alps a Daisy, Unreal Estate, There Are Werewolves at the Bottom of the Garden, In Arctic Circles
Children's Picture House (NCH3000)	1 October 1990	Transylvanian Homesick Blues (Compilation VHS with The Huckleberry Hound Show, Fireman Sam, Paddington Bear, and Barney)
Count Duckula: Astro Duck (TV8111)	1 October 1990	Astro Duck, The Rest is History!, Around the World in a Total Daze!, The Zombie Awakes!
Count Duckula: Lost City of Atlantis (WP0026)	1 October 1990	Lost City of Atlantis
My Little Count Duckula (ML0025)	1 July 1996	The Great Ducktective
Cult Kids Classics	2001	The Ghost of Castle McDuckula (Compilation VHS with Chorlton and the Wheelies, Danger Mouse, Jamie and the Magic Torch, Rainbow, and Button Moon)
Cult Kids Classics 2	5 March 2001	Venice a Duck Not a Duck (Compilation VHS with Jamie and the Magic Torch, Danger Mouse, Chorlton and the Wheelies, Rainbow, and The Sooty Show)
I Love Cult Kids	2002	The Great Ducktective (Compilation VHS with Danger Mouse, Chorlton and the Wheelies, Jamie and the Magic Torch, Rainbow, Cockleshell Bay, and Button Moon)
Classic Kids Collection	2002	Ducknapped (Compilation VHS with Chorlton and the Wheelies, Button Moon, Jamie and the Magic Torch, Danger Mouse, and Rainbow)

This VHS title appeared in 1990 but, at the time, the episodes contained were somewhat exclusive to video (the first was not televised until 1991, neither was the latter until 1993).

Count Duckula episodes were also released on special VHS compilations with episodes of other series. In 1989, the episode "Down under Duckula" was released on Thames' VHS title More Children's Summer Stories, with episodes from Danger Mouse and The Wind in the Willows. In 2001, in the twilight years of VHS, the episodes "The Ghost of Castle McDuckula" and "Venice a Duck, Not a Duck!" were featured on two Cult Kids collection tapes, with episodes of Rainbow, Chorlton and the Wheelies, Button Moon, Jamie and the Magic Torch and The Sooty Show.

=== Comics ===
Between 1988 and 1991, Marvel Comics distributed 15 issues of Count Duckula comics.

Count Duckula appeared in North American comics under Star Comics (an imprint of Marvel Comics) and introduced an additional difference between this incarnation of Duckula which separated him from his predecessors. Due to ketchup being used in the resurrection ceremony, this version of Duckula has ketchup, rather than blood, flowing through his veins. This was discovered when Duckula was given a blood test in order to get a passport into a fictional country which produced a salad which Duckula was obsessed with getting to eat. In the same issue, Duckula, Nanny, and Igor were photographed as a means of formal ID for said country; however, due to the classic stereotype of vampires not appearing in film, Duckula did not appear in the photo which was taken. Duckula also gained a romantic interest in the Star Comics run; Vanna Von Goosewing, who turned out to be the niece of his long time adversary Dr. Von Goosewing. The attraction was mutual, and the two continued their relationship through the majority of the series after their introduction, though Vanna didn't always appear in every issue of the book.

In Germany, a separate adaptation was produced under license as Graf Duckula, with script by Peter Mennigen and artwork by Miroslava Pollmer and Rüdiger Pareike.

=== Audiobooks ===
In the early 1990s at least two episodes were released in audiobook format on cassette tape with accompanying illustrated hardcover book featuring artwork from the original television episodes. They featured the original cast in new performances as they were edited considerably from the original television scripts for a shorter duration, removal of visual gags and the addition of new narration and character exposition where necessary. The "Restoration Comedy" episode was packaged with a small plastic Count Duckula figure in some territories.

- No Sax Please, We're Egyptian
- Restoration Comedy
- The Ghost of Castle McDuckula

=== Computer games ===
Alternative Software released a computer game based on Count Duckula called "No Sax Please, We're Egyptian!". In the game, Igor, Nanny and Count Duckula have decided to search the tomb of the great Pharaoh Upanatem (a pun on "up and at 'em") to find the mystic saxophone. What they do not know is that they have brought along some unwanted guests in the form of the Crow brothers.

The game was a basic jump and run platform-type game. At the start, the castle was transported to an ancient pyramid. Then, players had a set amount of time to go through the pyramid, evading the various baddies inside the pyramid, to retrieve the mystic sax before the Count's castle automatically returns to Transylvania, leaving the player stranded in Egypt.

The title of the game was a parody on the title of a British comedy play No Sex Please, We're British!.

The game was available for various 8-bit computers such as the ZX Spectrum, Commodore 64, & Amstrad CPC, and was also released as a "Kid's Pack" with other TV shows that Alternative Software turned into games, including Postman Pat, Sooty and Sweep, Popeye 2, The Wombles, and SuperTed. Alternative Software was one of the few software companies of the 1980s that still survives today as an independent software producer.

There was also a Count Duckula 2 sequel in 1992.

== See also ==
- List of vampire television series
- Quackula
- Vampire film
