= Jamie and the Magic Torch =

British animated television series (1977–1980)

- Genre: Animated series
- Written by: Jo Kemp; Brian Trueman
- Narrated by: Brian Trueman
- Theme music composer: Joe Griffiths; sung by Tony Steven
- Country of origin: United Kingdom
- No. of series: 3
- No. of episodes: 39

Production
- Executive producer: John Hambley
- Running time: 11 minutes
- Production company: Cosgrove Hall Productions

Original release
- Network: ITV
- Release: 28 March 1977 – January 21, 1980

Jamie and the Magic Torch is a British children's animated series made by Cosgrove Hall Productions for Thames Television and shown on the ITV network, running from 1977 to 1980.

The series was first written by Jo Kemp then later written and narrated by Brian Trueman, who later wrote shows such as Danger Mouse and Count Duckula for Cosgrove Hall.

== Premise ==
The programme is based around the titular young boy and his torch. When shone on the floor, the torch opens up a hole into a fun fantasy world called Cuckoo Land.

The beginning of each episode has Jamie's mother tucking him into bed at night and saying, "Sleep well, Jamie". Then from under his bed, his pet Old English Sheepdog, Wordsworth, appears, holding the torch in his mouth. Jamie takes the torch and shines it on the floor, opening up a portal to Cuckoo Land (in which Wordsworth always gets stuck). The portal manifests itself as a helter skelter.

When they reach the end of the slide, they fly out into Cuckoo Land from the bottom of a tree trunk, and land on a trampoline. All of this is accompanied by a song, written by Joe Griffiths. Once in Cuckoo Land, the fun begins.

== Characters in Cuckoo Land ==
- Mr. Boo, who flies around in his 'submachine', is obsessed with counting things.
- Officer Gotcha rides a unicycle and eats truncheons.
- Strumpers Plunkett plays melodies on his trumpet nose.
- Wellibob the cat does everything backwards and speaks with a Glaswegian accent.
- Jo-Jo Help is the unhelpful handyman.
- Nutmeg the ragdoll has a magical pocket that can produce all kinds of items.
- The Yoo-hoo Bird plays tricks on and runs from Officer Gotcha.
- Bullybundy is the show business rabbit with oversized feet.
- Arthur is a robot (series 3 only).

== Episodes ==
=== Series 1 (1977) ===
| No. | Title | Original release date |
|---|---|---|
| 1 | "Mr. Boo Loses A Mountain" | 28 March 1977 |
| 2 | "Nutmeg's House" | 4 April 1977 |
| 3 | "Let There Be Music" | 11 April 1977 |
| 4 | "Nutmeg's Box" | 18 April 1977 |
| 5 | "The Runaway Trombonium" | 25 April 1977 |
| 6 | "The Hair Stack" | 2 May 1977 |
| 7 | "Sym-Phoney" | 9 May 1977 |
| 8 | "The Flying Rabbit" | 16 May 1977 |
| 9 | "The Magicians Hat" | 23 May 1977 |
| 10 | "The Wicked Wand" | 30 May 1977 |
| 11 | "The House Of Wellibob" | 6 June 1977 |
| 12 | "National Wellibob Day" | 13 June 1977 |
| 13 | "Spade Work" | 20 June 1977 |

=== Series 2 (1978) ===
| No. | Title | Original release date |
|---|---|---|
| 1 | "Hidden Persuasion" | 3 April 1978 |
| 2 | "The Dirty Submachine" | 10 April 1978 |
| 3 | "Yoo-Hoo Yeti" | 17 April 1978 |
| 4 | "A Marrow Escape" | 24 April 1978 |
| 5 | "A Policeman's Lot" | 1 May 1978 |
| 6 | "A Flossed World" | 8 May 1978 |
| 7 | "Help! Help!" | 15 May 1978 |
| 8 | "One Cloudy Day" | 19 May 1978 |
| 9 | "The Downside-Upper" | 22 May 1978 |
| 10 | "Jeepers Creepers" | 6 June 1978 |
| 11 | "The Unexpected Visitor" | 12 June 1978 |
| 12 | "Big Magic" | 19 June 1978 |
| 13 | "Jamie's Birthday Party" | 26 June 1978 |

=== Series 3 (1979) ===
The dates were the intended transmission dates (13 August- 5 November 1979) (originally Buried Treasure was planned to be 5th November 1979) as the premiere ITV transmissions were delayed due to the 1979 ITV strike (the strike dates hitting Series 3 were 13 August-22 October) the series was finally shown from 29 October 1979 – 21 January 1980 (with Wishes transmitted on Christmas Eve 1979 and Mr Boo's Holiday transmitted on New Years Eve 1979).

| No. | Title | Original release date |
|---|---|---|
| 1 | "Unidentified Flying Elephant" | 13 August 1979 |
| 2 | "Arthur's Detour" | 20 August 1979 |
| 3 | "The Ghost Of Spiny Mountain" | 27 August 1979 |
| 4 | "Going Down" | 3 September 1979 |
| 5 | "The Great Race" | 10 September 1979 |
| 6 | "The Baby Show" | 17 September 1979 |
| 7 | "The Big Noise" | 24 September 1979 |
| 8 | "Hello, Goodbye" | 1 October 1979 |
| 9 | "Wishes" | 8 October 1979 |
| 10 | "Mr Boo's Holiday" | 15 October 1979 |
| 11 | "All Tied Up" | 22 October 1979 |
| 12 | "Beside The Seaside" | 29 October 1979 |
| 13 | "Buried Treasure" | 21 January 1980 |

== VHS releases ==
| VHS title | Release date | Episodes |
|---|---|---|
| Chorlton and Jamie's Magic Box (TV9937) | 3 November 1986 | Compilation VHS with Chorlton and the Wheelies |
| Bedtime Stories: Toad and Friends (TV8078) | 6 November 1989 | "The Flying Rabbit", "The House of Wellibob" (compilation VHS with The Wind in the Willows and Cockleshell Bay) |
| Cult Kids Classics | 2001 | "The Flying Rabbit" (compilation VHS with Chorlton and the Wheelies, Danger Mouse, Count Duckula, Rainbow and Button Moon) |
| Cult Kids Classics 2 | 5 March 2001 | "A Narrow Escape", "The Ghost of Spiny Mountain" (compilation VHS with Danger Mouse, Chorlton and the Wheelies, Rainbow, Count Duckula and The Sooty Show) |
| I Love Cult Kids | 2002 | "Yoo Hoo Yeti" (compilation VHS with Danger Mouse, Chorlton and the Wheelies, Count Duckula, Rainbow, Cockleshell Bay and Button Moon) |
| Classic Kids Collection | 2002 | "The Hair Stack" (compilation VHS with Count Duckula, Chorlton and the Wheelies, Button Moon, Danger Mouse and Rainbow - exclusive to Marks & Spencer) |

The first two series have also been released on DVD. In 2024, all 3 series of the show were released on DVD & Blu-Ray. They were also made available via a premium subscription to the ITVX streaming service.
