= List of Count Duckula episodes =

The following is an episode list of the British television series Count Duckula produced by Cosgrove Hall Films for Thames Television. It was first shown on ITV during its CITV output on weekday afternoons. Four series were made comprising 65 episodes which aired between 6 September 1988 and 16 February 1993.

== Series overview ==
Series	Episodes	Originally released	
Series	Episodes	First released	Last released
1	26	6 September 1988	21 March 1989
2	19	12 September 1989	23 January 1990
3	13	22 October 1990	21 January 1991
4	7	5 January 1993	16 February 1993

== Episodes ==
=== Series 1 (1988–89) ===
No. overall	No. in season	Title	Original release date	US air date
1	1	"No Sax Please, We're Egyptian!" "The Mystic Saxophone"	6 September 1988	24 December 1988 (Sneak Peek); 7 January 1989
Duckula, Igor and Nanny travel to Egypt in an attempt to recover an ancient artifact known as The Mystic Saxophone. Note: Dr. Von Goosewing makes a brief appearance inside the pyramid before his first appearance.
2	2	"Vampire Vacation"	13 September 1988	14 January 1989
Duckula travels to Spain to escape the dreary Transylvanian weather, meets his pyromaniac cousin and fights the deadliest bull in Spain. Note: The first official appearance of Dr. Von Goosewing.
3	3	"One Stormy Night"	20 September 1988	21 January 1989
Chaos looms in the castle as Goosewing's Frankenstein monster awakens, Nanny hides in the attic, Duckula seeks a snack, Igor gets lost and a stone replica of Duckula's evil ancestor is resurrected!
4	4	"Transylvanian Homesick Blues"	27 September 1988	28 January 1989
Duckula, Igor and Nanny take a literal rollercoaster ride through time.
5	5	"Restoration Comedy"	4 October 1988	4 February 1989
Bored with the look of the castle, Duckula hires a designer to redecorate the castle with Goosewing not too far behind...
6	6	"The Mutinous Penguins"	11 October 1988	11 February 1989
Lost in the Arctic seas, Duckula, Igor and Nanny must survive bloodthirsty pirates, defrosted Vikings and Dr. Von Goosewing in order to find their home.
7	7	"Dr. Von Goosewing's Invisible Ray"	18 October 1988	18 February 1989
Dr. Von Goosewing, along with his new invisible ray, invades the castle in another attempt to kill Duckula.
8	8	"Down Under Duckula"	25 October 1988	25 February 1989
While in Australia, Duckula accidentally sells the clock to a wallaby owner and must retrieve it before dawn rises in Transylvania.
9	9	"All in a Fog"	1 November 1988	4 March 1989
Inspired to be a detective, Duckula travels to England to solve a mystery, filled with old criminals, a homage to Sherlock Holmes and Goosewing's Fog Machine.
10	10	"Castle Duckula: Open to the Public!"	8 November 1988	11 March 1989
Duckula has some money troubles and decides to open Castle Duckula to the public for some extra cash.
11	11	"The Ghost of McCastle McDuckula"	15 November 1988	18 March 1989
Duckula, Igor and Nanny, on holiday in Scotland, hope to stay at the Glenn Sparrows Hotel but Igor takes Duckula to see an old relative, in hope that it will transform him back to his old, evil blood-thirsty ways.
12	12	"Igor's Busy Day"	22 November 1988	25 March 1989
An engaged couple spend the night in Castle Duckula, which bores The Count and frustrates Igor. Note: The couple are caricatures of Brad and Janet, the central protagonists of the cult horror-comedy musical, The Rocky Horror Show and its film, The Rocky Horror Picture Show.
13	13	"Autoduck"	29 November 1988	1 April 1989
Duckula tries to create a world record for the world's fastest car.
14	14	"The Vampire Strikes Back"	6 December 1988	8 April 1989
Duckula meets his hero, space explorer Tremendous Terrance, and ends up being stuck on Planet Cute, much to Igor's displeasure.
15	15	"Hardluck Hotel"	13 December 1988	15 April 1989
Duckula goes to stay at a worn-out and run-down hotel for the weekend but he has cash problems and ends up doing all the work for the manager unaware that Igor and Nanny are also staying there. Note: the manager of this hotel is a caricature of Basil Fawlty, the central character of the BBC's sitcom series, Fawlty Towers.
16	16	"Hunchbudgie of Notre Dame"	20 December 1988	22 April 1989
Duckula, Igor and Nanny are involved in a series of art thefts in Paris mainly because of Gaston & Pierre who have the deeds to the castle. It's up to Duckula & Igor and the police to solve the mystery.
17	17	"Dear Diary"	3 January 1989	29 April 1989
Duckula and Goosewing discover their grandfathers' diaries, and history is sure to repeat itself!
18	18	"Rent a Butler"	10 January 1989	6 May 1989
Duckula sells Igor and Nanny to an agency to make some money. All goes well, until he is invited to dinner to the house where Igor and Nanny are serving.
19	19	"Jungle Duck"	24 January 1989	20 May 1989
Duckula unwillingly buys a set of encyclopedias and he, Igor and Nanny travel to the jungles of darkest Africa to find the Lost Temple.
20	20	"Mobile Home"	31 January 1989	27 May 1989
Thinking he is rebuilding the castle, Duckula accidentally sells it to The Crow Brothers in disguise, brick by brick!
21	21	"A Fright at the Opera"	7 February 1989	3 June 1989
During a night out at the Opera, Nanny is kidnapped by the famous Phantom, and it's up to Duckula and Igor (who assisted with the kidnapping) to save her.
22	22	"Dr. Goosewing and Mr. Duck"	14 February 1989	10 June 1989
Goosewing creates a formula for carpet stains removal that when accidentally drunk, the victim becomes the complete opposite of their original selves. Von Goosewing becomes a vampire, Duckula becomes a real vampire, Igor is loving and Nanny becomes intelligent.
23	23	"Town Hall Terrors"	21 February 1989	17 June 1989
A pair of frightened villagers enter the castle, who make Duckula decide to renovate his home, but he first needs a grant from the Town Hall.
24	24	"Sawdust Ring"	28 February 1989	24 June 1989
Duckula, Igor and Nanny join the circus.
25	25	"Duck and the Broccoli Stalk"	7 March 1989	1 July 1989
Thanks to Goosewing's vegetable grower, Duckula, Igor and Nanny find themselves up a broccoli-stalk and into a giants' castle.
26	26	"A Family Reunion"	21 March 1989	13 May 1989
Duckula is chosen to host the family reunion on Halloween but he's not too keen on the idea as he knows that his relatives will kill him if they discover that he no longer drinks blood and he despises being a vampire, so he decides to fake it.

=== Series 2 (1989–90) ===
No. overall	No. in season	Title	Original release date	US air date
27	1	"Ghostly Gold"	12 September 1989	6 January 1990
Duckula travels to the black mountains in the Yukon to find treasure and gold.
28	2	"Ducknapped!"	19 September 1989	13 January 1990
A ransom note is sent to Castle Duckula stating that The Count had been kidnapped, despite still being in the castle. He shows the note to Nanny, who thinks he HAS been kidnapped.
29	3	"The Lost Valley"	26 September 1989	20 January 1990
Duckula, Igor and Nanny go to watch a film called 'The Lost Valley' and get trapped inside the film. In the end of the film, they end up in the commercials.
30	4	"The Incredible Shrinking Duck"	3 October 1989	27 January 1990
Von Goosewing tries shrinking the Castle to put in a glass snowglobe model, but he loses the snowglobe.
31	5	"Hi-Duck!"	10 October 1989	3 February 1990
Duckula, Igor and Nanny take an aeroplane to Nice, which gets hijacked by the bumbling French crooks, Gaston and Pierre.
32	6	"Prime-Time Duck"	17 October 1989	10 February 1990
Transylvanian Television arrive at the castle to feature it in a television programme, much to Igor's misery. However, Igor is cast as The Count and Nanny as The Countess; meanwhile, the real Count Duckula is cast as all the servants.
33	7	"Bloodsucking Fruit Bats of the Lower Amazon"	24 October 1989	17 February 1990
Igor attempts to have the family bat bite Duckula to turn him into a proper vampire again, but when it transpires that the bat is fully trained, he tricks The Count into going to the Amazon to find another bat.
34	8	"The Count and the Pauper – I Ain't Gonna Work on Maggots' Farm No More!"	31 October 1989	24 February 1990
Duckula is sick of life at the castle and plans to leave Transylvania, but during a walk, he bumps into Sid Quack – an incredible lookalike – and they both decide to swap roles for a while, Duckula as a hard-working, underprivileged farm boy, while Sid becomes a spoilt, rich aristocrat.
35	9	"Arctic Circles"	7 November 1989	3 March 1990
Duckula travels to the North Pole and fires Igor for a penguin butler called Jyves.
36	10	"Transylvania Take-Away"	14 November 1989	10 March 1990
Duckula, Igor and Nanny head to China in search of missing treasure.
37	11	"Whodunnit?"	21 November 1989	17 March 1990
Duckula gets a letter stating that his Great-Uncle had died, when he goes to the reading of the will, it transpires that his uncle was murdered, and when The Count can't recall where he was on the night of the murder, he believes he killed him, confessing to Igor that he wants to be a true vampire again.
38	12	"No Yaks Please, We're Tibetan!"	28 November 1989	24 March 1990
The trio climbs the Himalayas, despite warnings about a Yeti.
39	13	"Beau Duckula"	5 December 1989	31 March 1990
Duckula joins the French foreign Legion.
40	14	"Mississippi Duck"	12 December 1989	7 April 1990
Count Duckula and his servants travel onto a steamboat in the River Mississippi, where he tries to become a jazz trumpet player. However, this wasn't what everyone else on the boat had in mind...
41	15	"Amnesiac Duck"	19 December 1989	14 April 1990
Duckula falls down a hole in the castle's cellar causing amnesia, which leads to him lusting for blood once again!
42	16	"The Mysteries of the Wax Museum"	2 January 1990	21 April 1990
The Mad Scientist creates robot doubles of Duckula, Igor and Nanny to rob the Bank of England.
43	17	"The Return of the Curse of the Secret of the Mummy's Tomb Meets Frankenduckula's Monster and the Wolf-Man and the Intergalactic Cabbage..." "A Very Long Title"	9 January 1990	28 April 1990
Duckula is chased by an alien cabbage, a werewolf, a mummy, Frankenstein's monster, Von Goosewing, and some angry villagers. Just an average day in Castle Duckula, then. NOTE: US TV guides list this as A Very Long Title.
44	18	"The Lost City of Atlantis"	16 January 1990	5 May 1990
The trio find the Lost City of Atlantis.
45	19	"Bad Luck, Duck"	23 January 1990	12 May 1990
Duckula's attempts at showing Nanny that superstitions are complete nonsense cause him a lot of pain.

=== Series 3 (1990–91) ===
No. overall	No. in season	Title	Original release date	US air date
46	1	"Private Beak"	22 October 1990	17 April 1991
Duckula becomes a private detective in Chicago.
47	2	"Astro Duck"	29 October 1990	24 April 1991
Duckula's new computer causes problems for TRASH (the Transylvanian Space Authority) and ends up landing the castle on the Moon.
48	3	"Unreal Estate"	5 November 1990	10 April 1991
Duckula is fed up with the Castle crumbling around him so he decides to sell it, much to Igor's horror, in Hollywood. NOTE: This was originally the pilot episode, which like many of Cosgrove Hall, was created just for a test audience and wasn't meant to be shown to the public, but was later made into part of season 3. As a result, the animation style is much different in most scenes (closer to "Danger Mouse" style), much of first half of the episode is spent on exposition and the very first scene with Dr. Von Goosewing shows him discovering from the newspaper that Duckula was reincarnated. Duckula himself appears to be new to the fact of being a vampire (for example, is surprised by the fact he can teleport by will). The harmonica scene from the intro also appears in the episode in a full version and proper context.
49	4	"Bombay Duck (or 1,001 Transylvanian Nights)"	12 November 1990	1 May 1991
Duckula gets tricked by a fake Genie into going to India.
50	5	"There Are Werewolves at the Bottom of Our Garden"	19 November 1990	8 May 1991
The castle's werewolf has escaped and it's up to Igor and Nanny to get it back before Duckula finds out. Note: This episode was aired as part of CITV's Old Skool Weekend Marathon.
51	6	"Duck Ahoy"	26 November 1990	15 May 1991
Duckula enters a boat race hoping to win the prize money and as usual, things don't go to plan.
52	7	"The Great Ducktective"	3 December 1990	22 May 1991
Goosewing tries to frame Duckula for a relative's murder with the help of Detectives Soames & Potson.
53	8	"Dead Eye Duck"	10 December 1990	29 May 1991
Duckula becomes a deputy in the Wild West.
54	9	"The Show Must Go On!"	17 December 1990	5 June 1991
Duckula decides to become an actor and stages the story of Jack and the Magic Walnut at the castle with himself as Jack, Nanny as The Good Fairy, Igor as The Giant and The Crow Brothers as Mushrooms, Magic Elves and Wood Pixies.
55	10	"A Christmas Quacker"	26 December 1990	26 December 1990
Duckula is visited by both Father Christmas (otherwise known as Santa Claus) and Von Goosewing at the Castle on Christmas Day.
56	11	"The Rest Is History!"	7 January 1991	12 June 1991
Duckula travels back in time to stop the first Count Duckula from becoming a vampire.
57	12	"00 Duck"	14 January 1991	19 June 1991
The Egg decides to steal Castle Duckula to take over the world.
58	13	"Mystery Cruise"	21 January 1991	26 June 1991
Nanny wins tickets to go on a cruise, but the trio becomes a nuisance for the other passengers.

=== Series 4 (1993) ===
Thames Television ceased broadcasting on New Year's Eve 1992 to be replaced by Carlton Television. After 1992, Thames became an independent production company, making programmes commissioned from broadcasters. Although Thames Television produced the last seven episodes, it was still a requirement to have an ITV franchise to be allowed such programmes onto the ITV network. Thames Television for Carlton Television presented for ITV. David Jason was also busy filming the first series of A Touch of Frost in 1992, and was unavailable for some of that year. According to Brian Trueman, thirteen more episodes were scripted and recorded, but were never animated due to Thames Television's loss of the ITV licence.

When the third DVD boxset was released in the UK by FremantleMedia, the seven episodes which make up Series 4 were added to Series 3. All episodes that make up Series 4 were dated 1989.

No. overall	No. in season	Title	Original release date
59	1	"Around the World in a Total Daze!"	5 January 1993
Von Goosewing, with the help of world famous explorer, Sibellious Smogg, challenges Duckula to a race around the world.
60	2	"Manhattan Duck"	12 January 1993
Castle Duckula mistakenly lands in the middle of New York, on top of all places, a department store, and Count Duckula makes a bit of money by selling the contents of the house. The only problem is getting back the clock, an important part of the castle's travelling mechanism-has been sold too!
61	3	"Alps-a-Daisy!"	19 January 1993
Duckula tries to impress a group of rich girls by winning all the winter sports.
62	4	"Prince Duckula"	26 January 1993
After an accidental TV appearance, The Count is approached to play a Prince in a Hollywood film.
63	5	"Venice a Duck, Not a Duck!"	2 February 1993
In Venice, the Egg plans to get his revenge on Duckula by asking all his adversaries from the past (minus Von Goosewing) to plan a nasty end for The Count.
64	6	"A Mountie Always Gets His Duck!"	9 February 1993
Duckula travels to Canada to become a Mountie and to help an old friend, Geoffrey, to arrest and lock up a French villain on the run.
65	7	"The Zombie Awakes"	16 February 1993
Dr. Quackbrain (Barry Clayton) lures Duckula to his dream machine for his greatest experiment, to peer inside the dreams of a real vampire (unaware that The Count is unlike any of his ancestors).
