= Cockleshell Bay =

British stop-motion animated TV series (1980–1986)

- Genre: Stop motion, animation
- Created by: Cosgrove Hall
- Starring: Brian Trueman
- Country of origin: United Kingdom
- Original language: English
- No. of series: 8
- No. of episodes: 104

Production
- Executive producer: John Hambley
- Producers: Brian Cosgrove; Mark Hall
- Running time: 10 minutes
- Production company: Cosgrove Hall

Original release
- Network: ITV
- Release: 6 May 1980 – 1 July 1986

Cockleshell Bay is a stop motion children's television series which was shown on ITV during the early 1980s. It was made by Cosgrove Hall Productions for its parent company, the ITV broadcaster Thames Television. Other children's programmes in the same ITV time slot on the remaining four weekdays included Let's Pretend, Jamie and the Magic Torch, and Rainbow – the latter is the show in which Cockleshell Bay began as a regular story feature (reflected in the rainbow design of Cockleshell Bay's logo).

== Plot ==
Twins Robin and Rosie Cockle are the main characters. They live at the Bucket and Spade guest house, run by their parents Helen and Christopher. The family has moved to the Bay from a city called Roughington, because their parents wanted to leave city life behind, and their father no longer wanted to work in a factory.

Although Robin and Rosie frequently argue with each other, it is clear that they greatly enjoy each other's company. Gran Routy (who is no relation to the family, but is known as "Gran" due to her large number of grandchildren) helps out at the house. Robin and Rosie's friends include Mr. Ezikiel Shipham (known locally as Mr Ship), Mr. Fingal and his donkey Fury (whom Mr. Ship looks after), and Ben Gunn the "pirate seagull". In the later series Robin and Rosie have a baby sister called Holly.

== Series overview ==
Series	Episodes	Originally released	
Series	Episodes	First released	Last released
1	13	6 May 1980	29 July 1980
2	13	24 March 1981	16 June 1981
3	13	28 September 1981	21 December 1981
4	13	29 March 1982	21 June 1982
5	13	4 January 1983	5 April 1983
6	13	10 January 1984	3 April 1984
7	13	16 April 1985	9 July 1985
8	13	8 April 1986	1 July 1986

== Episode guide ==
=== Series 1 (1980) ===
- 6 May 1980: "A Fresh Start"
- 13 May 1980: "Names"
- 20 May 1980: "The Pirate Seagull"
- 27 May 1980: "Buried Treasure"
- 3 June 1980: "Arrow is Arrows is Arrows"
- 10 June 1980: "Mortar This than Meets the Eye"
- 17 June 1980: "Ben Gunn Strikes Again"
- 24 June 1980: "Round and Round and Up and Down"
- 1 July 1980: "The Grand Old Duke of York"
- 8 July 1980: "Spring Cleaning"
- 15 July 1980: "Land Ho"
- 22 July 1980: "The House That Robin and Rosie Built"
- 29 July 1980: "Happy Birthday Gran Routy"

=== Series 2 (1981) ===
- 24 March 1981: "Fishy Things"
- 31 March 1981: "The Disappearing Peas"
- 7 April 1981: "Something Beginning with P"
- 14 April 1981: "The Pirate King"
- 21 April 1981: "Footprints in the Sand"
- 28 April 1981: "Bumps and Twangles"
- 5 May 1981: "Beachcombing"
- 12 May 1981: "Rosie the Ballerina"
- 19 May 1981: "A Day in the Sand Dunes"
- 26 May 1981: "A Couple of Carpenters"
- 2 June 1981: "A Cart Made for Two"
- 9 June 1981: "The Grown Ups' Secret"
- 16 June 1981: "Cockleshell Bay Concert"

=== Series 3 (1981) ===
- 28 September 1981: "The Mystery of the Talking Donkey"
- 5 October 1981: "Mr Ship's New Crew"
- 12 October 1981: "Ben Gunn Goes Missing"
- 19 October 1981: "Shirts, Socks and Sunshine"
- 26 October 1981: "Mr Ship's African Adventure"
- 2 November 1981: "Robin and Rosie at the Gallop"
- 9 November 1981: "Gran Routy Bowls Them Over"
- 16 November 1981: "Rock and Roll Robin"
- 23 November 1981: "Robin and Rosie Hit the Trail"
- 30 November 1981: "Tea Time Troubles"
- 7 December 1981: "In the Cart"
- 14 December 1981: "The Boatyard Sailors"
- 21 December 1981: "A Cockleshell Christmas"

=== Series 4 (1982) ===
- 29 March 1982: "The Cockleshell Cooks"
- 5 April 1982: "Deep Sea Divers"
- 12 April 1982: "Football Crazy"
- 19 April 1982: "The Birthday Secret"
- 26 April 1982: "Fury Comes to Tea!"
- 3 May 1982: "Robin the Vet"
- 10 May 1982: "A Dressing-Up Day"
- 17 May 1982: "The Eight-Wheeled Cockles"
- 24 May 1982: "Nurse Rosie"
- 31 May 1982: "Stage Struck"
- 7 June 1982: "Cockleshell Keep-Fit"
- 14 June 1982: "The Well-Groomed Donkey"
- 21 June 1982: "Carnival!"

=== Series 5 (1983) ===
- 4 January 1983: "Dust Sheet Dramas"
- 11 January 1983: "Dad's Marathon"
- 18 January 1983: "Gypsy Rose Routy"
- 25 January 1983: "Flying High"
- 1 February 1983: "The Treasure Hunt"
- 8 February 1983: "Alleys and Dobbers"
- 15 February 1983: "Ben Gunn Gets Busy"
- 22 February 1983: "Another Boxing Day"
- 1 March 1983: "Mr Cockle's Common Cold"
- 8 March 1983: "It's in the Air"
- 15 March 1983: "Words, Words, Words"
- 22 March 1983: "Long Ears and Tall Stories"
- 29 March 1983: "The Cockleshell Easter Fayre"

=== Series 6 (1984) ===
- 10 January 1984: "Tyred Out"
- 17 January 1984: "Ostriches and Obstacles"
- 24 January 1984: "Squeak, Squeak!"
- 31 January 1984: "Holed in One"
- 7 February 1984: "Robin and Rosie Clean Up"
- 14 February 1984: "Tea Trays and Tumbles"
- 21 February 1984: "The Vikings are Coming!"
- 28 February 1984: "Skates Alive!"
- 6 March 1984: "Spinners and Conkers"
- 13 March 1984: "Easy as Toffee Apples!"
- 20 March 1984: "Iceberg on the Port Bow"
- 27 March 1984: "A Frosty Day"
- 3 April 1984: "Under Canvas"

=== Series 7 (1985) ===
- 16 April 1985: "Footprints and Floorcloths"
- 23 April 1985: "The Attic"
- 30 April 1985: "Paste and Paper Everywhere"
- 7 May 1985: "Moving In"
- 14 May 1985: "A New Friend"
- 21 May 1985: "Donkey is on the Loose"
- 28 May 1985: "Buon Giorno, Signora!"
- 4 June 1985: "False Alarm"
- 11 June 1985: "A Name for Baby Cockle"
- 18 June 1985: "The Magpie Braves"
- 25 June 1985: "Lost and Found"
- 2 July 1985: "Drawing and Winning"
- 9 July 1985: "A Puzzle... and a Party"

=== Series 8 (1986) ===
- 8 April 1986: "Holly on the Loose"
- 15 April 1986: "Taming of the Lion"
- 22 April 1986: "Steaming Ahead"
- 29 April 1986: "The Puppet Show"
- 6 May 1986: "Mr Cockle Cooks"
- 13 May 1986: "Shopping and Shipwrecks"
- 20 May 1986: "A Day at the Chariot Races"
- 27 May 1986: "Storms at Sea"
- 3 June 1986: "Ben Gunn's New Feathers"
- 10 June 1986: "Dr. Mario"
- 17 June 1986: "Blow Me Down"
- 24 June 1986: "Holly Catches a Train"
- 1 July 1986: "Never Been 21 Before"

== VHS releases ==
VHS title	Release date	Episodes
Cockleshell Bay (TV9901)	3 November 1986	"A Fresh Start", "Names", "The Pirate Seagull", "The Grand Old Duke of York", "Happy Birthday Gran Routy"
Seaside Tales from Cockleshell Bay (TV9951)	17 August 1987	"Mr. Ship's African Adventure", "Nurse Rosie", "Mr. Fingal's Skating Lesson", "Ostriches and Obstacles", "Cockleshell Christmas"
Robin and Rosie's Adventures in Cockleshell Bay (TV9952)	5 October 1987	"Fishy Things", "The Pirate King", "A Day in the Sand Dunes", "A Cart Made for Two", "Cockleshell Bay Concert"
Bedtime Stories: Toad and Friends (TV8078)	6 November 1989	"Flying High" (compilation VHS with The Wind in the Willows and Jamie and the Magic Torch)
I Love Cult Kids	2002	"The Pirate Seagull" (compilation VHS with Danger Mouse, Chorlton and the Wheelies, Count Duckula, Jamie and the Magic Torch, Rainbow and Button Moon)

== Credits ==
Writer and narrator
Brian Trueman
Music
David Rohl, Stuart J. Wolstenholme
Animation
Andrea Lord, Steve Moss
Puppet design
Bridget Appleby
Illustrations
Josie Yee & Ivor Wood
Sets & props
Chris Walker
Puppet construction
Peter Saunders
Camera
Jim Noble, Jane Hilcks
Film editor
John McManus
Executive producer
John Hambley
Director
Jackie Cockle
Producers
Mark Hall, Brian Cosgrove
Copyright 1980, 1981, 1982, 1983, 1984, 1985, & 1986 Cosgrove/Hall Productions Ltd
Thames Colour Production
