= Button Moon =

British children's TV programme

- Promotional poster
- Genre: Children's television series Science fiction
- Created by: Ian Allen
- Narrated by: Robin Parkinson
- Theme music composer: Peter Davison and Sandra Dickinson
- Composer: Peter Goslin
- Country of origin: United Kingdom
- Original language: English
- No. of series: 7
- No. of episodes: 91

Production
- Executive producer: Charles Warren
- Producer: Stan Woodward
- Running time: 10 minutes
- Production company: Thames Television

Original release
- Network: ITV
- Release: 8 December 1980 – 1 December 1988

Button Moon is a British children's television programme, created by Ian Allen, produced by Thames Television, and broadcast originally 8 December 1980 to 1 December 1988 on ITV. The series focuses on the adventures of the Spoon family, who visit the titular lunar object that orbits their planet via a homemade rocket. Each episode was ten minutes long, with each of the show's series consisting of thirteen episodes.

Stories for each episode involved many of the characters and props being based on kitchen utensils and household objects, with each plot involving members of the Spoon family experiencing an adventure on Button Moon, before viewing a story being played out in another world. The show received numerous VHS and DVD releases, as well as being sold to several countries outside the United Kingdom.

== Production ==
In 1978, Ian Allen came up with the concept of Button Moon as a stage show for Playboard Puppets in 1978. In 1980, Allen was approached by the producers of the children's series Rainbow, who were looking to introduce new recurring story features for the programme. Discussions for implementing his concept into the programme later determined his idea would be more suitable to be its own stand-alone programme, with Thames Television green-lighting a pilot episode. The broadcast later proved popular, leading Thames to commission additional episodes for their schedules.

Production of each episode saw Allen work alongside fellow puppeteers that included John Thirtle, Francis Wright, Alistair Fullarton, Robin Stevens, Sue Dacre, Chris Leith, Judith Bucklow, Ian Brown, Rhiann West, and Tony Holtham. Stories were narrated by Robin Parkinson, with the show's soundtrack written by Peter Goslin; the show's theme tune was composed and performed by Peter Davison and Sandra Dickinson, who were married at the time.

== Episode list ==
=== Series 1 (1980–1981) ===
No.	Title	Original release date
1	"Three Little Pigs"	8 December 1980
Mrs. Spoon gives Mr. Spoon a present. It's a spaceship, so now he can fly to Button Moon.
2	"The Witch's Toast"	15 December 1980
Mr. Spoon flies from Junk Planet, through Blanket Sky to shining Button Moon. There he meets Captain Large and the Bottle Army. Through his telescope he spies a witch's magic.
3	"Billy Goat's Gruff"	22 December 1980
Mr. Spoon flies from his home on Junk Planet to Button Moon.
4	"Sid and Baby"	29 December 1980
Mr. Spoon lives with his family on Junk Planet. He has seen Button Moon shining in Blanket Sky and travels there in his spaceship.
5	"The Three Wishes"	5 January 1981
Mr. Spoon goes to see Captain Large and his army. He also meets Bertie and Gertie, who have three wishes.
6	"Storks"	12 January 1981
Mr. Spoon sees the stars playing a game. He also sees two strange birds and a camel who help to bring happiness to a sad princess.
7	"The Duck Who Forgot What He Was"	19 January 1981
Mr. Spoon finds a kitchen dresser and helps some cups that have lost their saucers. Through his telescope he sees a duck with a lost memory.
8	"Scruffy and the Bone"	26 January 1981
Mr. Spoon helps a pair of scissors which have accidentally cut a thread holding Button Moon in Blanket Sky. Through his telescope, he sees two unusual dancers and Scruffy and Basil, two dogs which play hunt the bone.
9	"The Grasshopper and the Ants"	2 February 1981
Mr. Spoon sees a lazy grasshopper and some busy ants preparing for the winter.
10	"The Magic Totem"	9 February 1981
Mr. Spoon sees some very brightly coloured birds.
11	"The Hare and the Tortoise"	16 February 1981
Mr. Spoon, who lives with his family on Junk Planet, takes his daughter, Tina Teaspoon, on her first trip to Button Moon. They find some talking umbrellas there and through a telescope see a hare and a tortoise having a race.
12	"The Fox and the Hen"	23 February 1981
Mr. Spoon travels to Button Moon where he finds a wardrobe and helps to make a sad dress happy.
13	"House For Sale"	2 March 1981
Mr. Spoon and his family watch a performance of the Paper Circus. Then through their telescope they see Scruffy the dog, whose best friend is moving away.

=== Series 2 (1981–1982) ===
No.	Title	Original release date
14	"A Witch Comes To Stay"	29 December 1981
The Spoon family travel to Button Moon where the Vacuum cleaner is sucking up fallen stardust. When they look through the telescope they see Brew the witch preparing for her mother to visit.
15	"The Caterpillar Who Loved His Greens"	5 January 1982
Mr Spoon takes Tina to Button Moon. There they see a single glove who has lost her partner. Tina meets Reggie Veggie, a man made out of vegetables. Through the telescope, they see a caterpillar turn into a beautiful butterfly.
16	"The New Canoe"	12 January 1982
It is snowing all over Blanket Sky. Whilst Tina and Mrs Spoon stay home to build a snowman, Mr Spoon visits Button Moon. There he sees the bottle army trying to keep warm in the snow and through the telescope.
17	"The Biggest Tomato In The World"	19 January 1982
Tina Teaspoon is playing hide and seek with Mr and Mrs Spoon in the garden. Then Mr Spoon and Tina go to Button Moon where they find Vacuum Cleaner where he puts the morning post and the newspaper on the doormat. Through the telescope, they see Bertie and Gertie where her fairy god mother grants her 3 wishes. She first wishes that Bertie had the biggest tomatoes to enter in the vegetable competition. However, they don't get there in time and lose, but Gertie wins a prize for the hat she made.
18	"Scruffy and the Sparrow"	26 January 1982
Mr Spoon flies to Button Moon in his spaceship where he finds Vacuum Cleaner and Small Bottle are cleaning the castle pipes. Through his telescope, Mr Spoon sees Scruffy the dog, who is singing like a bird.
19	"The Dragon Has a Cold"	2 February 1982
Mr Spoon takes off early in the morning to Button Moon. Through his telescope, he sees Brew the witch and her dragon who has a cold.
20	"The Flying Jam Sandwich"	9 February 1982
When Mr Spoon lands his spaceship on Button Moon, the blast from the engine blows little Fluff into outer space and on to a star. Mr Spoon comes up with an idea to save him but needs help. Through the telescope, Mr Spoon sees Hare and Tortoise having fun at Hare's house, but Wally wasp keeps moving the jam sandwich from the plate to the ceiling.
21	"The Persian Market"	16 February 1982
Mrs Spoon and Tina Teaspoon are baking a Victoria Sponge Cake while Mr Spoon goes to Button Moon. On Button Moon, Mr Spoon finds the Kitchen Dresser where Arthur and Martha Muggins live. On the dresser, Roddy Teapot has lost his lid. Mr Spoon offers to help find it, but a mouse comes onto the dresser and steals some cheese from the cheese board. Mr Spoon goes after the mouse only to find Roddy's lid. Through the telescope, Mr Spoon sees a Persian Market where there are a Snake Charmer, The Sand Dancers and a Man on a unicycle with a bucket of sand on his head. The episode features Albert Ketèlbey's orchestral work of the same name.
22	"Music In the Air"	23 February 1982
Tina's best friend Egbert comes over, so Mr Spoon takes them both to Button Moon. On Button Moon, they find a toy box where they meet Rag Doll, The Wibbly Wobbly Man and Robby Robot who are all afraid of the dinosaur that lives in the toy cupboard. Mr Spoon offers to help set them free but soon learns that the Pink and Purple Dinosaur is very friendly. The other toys are not afraid of him anymore. Through the telescope, they see a park where it's a very windy day, and the band is playing music in the park bandstand. Scruffy the dog and his friends Basil and Daisy help Mr Cherry the band leader retrieve his sheets of music back when the wind blows them away.
23	"Scruffy At the Seaside"	2 March 1982
Mr and Mrs Spoon are off for an evening out on Button Moon while Egbert stays the night with Tina Teaspoon. On Button Moon, Mr and Mrs Spoon go out in the Gravy Boat for a trip around Button Hole Pond to watch the pond life. In the pond, they see sponge fish, plate fish and Nelly Newt who tells us that they are all going to the Octopus Opera. Little John Turtle can't see her as he's right at the back, but Big Whale helps him by letting John Turtle sit on his back and watch the show. Through the telescope, they see Scruffy the dog going to the seaside.
24	"The Little Red Hen"	9 March 1982
Today is Tina Teaspoon's birthday and the family goes off to Button Moon for Tina's birthday surprise. They land on Button Moon where a royal biscuit box takes them to Tabletop Mountain where Queenie Jelly lives. They put on a royal show for Tina from performing doughnuts, The Strongest Gingerbread Man and finally the Birthday Cake. Through the Telescope, they see the story of The Little Red Hen who wants to make some bread, but her friends the Cat, the Pig and the Cow won't help her.
25	"Getting Away With It All"	16 March 1982
Tina and Egbert are drawing pictures in the house while Mr Spoon goes off to Button Moon. The Spaceship lands on Button Moon where Mr Spoon finds a Bathroom where he helps junior toothbrush who's missing the excitement in bathroom. Through the telescope, Mr Spoon sees Brew the Witch who's fed up with the ticking clock, Thunder chewing on her newspaper, Little Brown Spider turning on the radio and Lightning the cat rushing around everywhere. She magics herself away on holiday to an "Island In The Sun" but soon grows homesick and magics herself home.
26	"The Lion and the Mouse"	23 March 1982
The Spoon Family are going on Holiday to the Button Moon Hotel. When they land the spaceship on Button Moon, they watch the Paper Circus. Afterwards, they look through the telescope to see a jungle where we see the story of the Lion and the Mouse.

=== Series 3 (1983) ===
No.	Title	Original release date
27	"Looking For Button Moon"	5 October 1983
The Spoon family follow a shooting star to Button Moon in their spaceship. They look through the telescope and see Scruffy the dog in his garden.
28	"Tina Teaspoon and the School Mouse"	12 October 1983
Mr Spoon takes his daughter Tina to Button Moon to cheer her up after she loses her schools pet mouse. They look through the telescope and see Peggity the Hen at Cherry Tree Farm.
29	"A Day Trip To Button Moon"	19 October 1983
On a day trip to Button Moon, the Spoon family run into Small Bottle, who has lost his toy marbles. As he searches for them, he gets into all sorts of bother by getting stuck in a cupboard. Then they look through the telescope and see Lion, Monkey and Jungle Mouse in the jungle.
30	"Shoebox Station"	26 October 1983
Egbert and Tina have fun dressing up in old clothes in Mr and Mrs Spoon's attic. Mr Spoon then takes them to Button Moon to ride on a train at Shoebox Station.
31	"Two Sticky Mugs"	2 November 1983
On Button Moon, Mr Spoon finds the two mugs, Arthur and Martha stuck to the kitchen dresser with strawberry jam. Through the telescope, Mr Spoon sees Scruffy the dog who is trying to get to sleep.
32	"Button Hole Pond"	9 November 1983
Mr Spoon goes out in his Gravy Boat on Button Hole Pond and sees John Turtle looking for hidden treasure. Through the telescope, Brew the witch is spring cleaning.
33	"The Scouts' Garden Fete"	16 November 1983
Egbert and his dad are looking for prizes for the scouts garden fete. Mr Spoon offers to take the winner of the scouts garden fete's prize draw, on a trip to Button Moon in the spaceship.
34	"Queenie Jelly"	23 November 1983
The Spoon family take a trip to Table Top Mountain where Queenie Jelly is having a party. Mr Spoon looks through the telescope and sees some crows on Cherry Tree Farm.
35	"Painting the Pipes"	30 November 1983
Mr. Spoon travels to Button Moon where Small Bottle & Captain Large from The Plastic Bottle Army are giving the Castle a new coat of paint.
36	"Freddy Teddy"	7 December 1983
Granny Spoon comes to visit the Spoon family again. Mr Spoon, Tina, and Granny Spoon all go to Button Moon for the day. On Button Moon, Freddy Teddy is hiding in the toy box because moths have put holes in his dungarees. Mr Spoon takes Freddy Teddy to get his clothes patched up. Then Mr Spoon and Tina look through the telescope and see Scruffy the dog in his garden.
37	"The Clown Who Lost His Smile"	14 December 1983
Mr Spoon goes to Button Moon and helps Rag Doll find a missing toy clown. The clown has fallen in a puddle and had his smile washed off. Mr Spoon comes up with a plan to help him get the clown a new smile. Through the telescope, Brew the witch is seen making porridge for Thunder the dragon.
38	"Happy Birthday Mrs Spoon"	21 December 1983
It's Mrs Spoon's birthday, and Mr Spoon and Tina have a surprise in store for her, they take her to Button Moon for the day in the spaceship. Through the telescope, they see Mr Cherry, the leader of the brass band, who has a cold.
39	"Bundle and Fluff"	28 December 1983
Mr. Spoon takes a trip to Button Moon and watches Vacuum Cleaner as he looks for Bundle and Fluff. Then through the telescope, Bertie and Gertie are seen. Gertie wishes for her fairy godmother to come, who grants her wish of a nice holiday.

=== Series 4 (1985) ===
No.	Title	Original release date
40	"Egbert Goes To Button Moon"	30 January 1985
Tina visits her best friend Egbert, who lives at the top of a block of flat. They both fly to Button Moon. There they see a wind-up mouse that has lost his key. Through the telescope, they see Bertie and Gertie being King and Queen for a day.
41	"The Spaceship Breaks Down"	6 February 1985
Mr Spoon goes to Button Moon, while Mrs Spoon is busy wallpapering their Cardboard Box House and Tina is painting her go kart. The spaceship breaks down on the way, but Rag Doll comes to the rescue in her paper plane. Mr Spoon and Rag Doll look through the telescope and see Scruffy the dog and Dennis the rabbit.
42	"Playing Games On Button Moon"	13 February 1985
Tina can't go to Button Moon as she's been naughty, so Mr Spoon takes Egbert with him instead. They watch Small Bottle and Little Bottle playing games, and then they look through the telescope and see Brew the witch.
43	"The Gravy Boat"	20 February 1985
Tina and Mr Spoon take the Gravy Boat on Button Hole Pond and see a sponge fish who doesn't want to go to school. Then they look through the telescope and see Jungle Mouse sleeping in his water melon hammock, but when he wakes up, he can't find his friends.
44	"Sticky Sweets"	27 February 1985
Mr and Mrs Spoon and Tina take Egbert to Button Moon. They watch Rag Doll disco-dancing, Freddy Teddy trying to play the piano and Toffee the clown trying to juggle sweets. They look through the telescope and see Pamela Pig and her piglets and a walking haystack in a farmyard.
45	"Picnic On Button Moon"	6 March 1985
The Spoon family and Egbert arrive on Button Moon to find Freddy Teddy and Rag Doll having a picnic. Egbert and Tina join them, and a falling star lands in one of their drinks. Through the telescope, Scruffy the dog is seen playing in the snow.
46	"The Cake Fairy Goes Ice Skating"	13 March 1985
The Spoon family take Granny Spoon to Button Moon for the day. There they watch an ice skater perform on a cake, and later through the telescope, they see Brew the witch and Thunder buying dinner from a fish and chip shop.
47	"Rag Doll Marries A Dinosaur"	20 March 1985
Mr Spoon has a cold so stays at home whilst Mrs Spoon, Tina, and Egbert go to Button Moon. On Button Moon, Rag Doll finds an album full of wedding photographs; this makes her want to pretend to get married. Freddy Teddy is too busy to be the groom, but the pink and purple dinosaur agrees to marry Rag Doll.
48	"Egbert Goes Camping"	27 March 1985
Egbert and Daddy Egbert are going camping in Brushwood Forest. Tina wants to go with them, but she and her parents are off on a trip to Button Moon. Mr Spoon decides to hide a tent in the spaceship to surprise Tina but has problems keeping it a secret.
49	"Banana Birds"	3 April 1985
Whilst Mrs Spoon fixes her television aerial, so she and Vanilla can watch their favorite program, Mr Spoon takes Tina and Egbert to Button Moon. Small and Captain Large unblock a pipe and out pops a banana bird. Through the telescope, Mr Spoon, Tina and Egbert spy on Scruffy and Simon playing fetch with a ball at the park.
50	"Pink and Purple Dinosaur"	10 April 1985
The Spoon family go on a trip to Button Moon and see a lonely Pink and Purple Dinosaur looking for a friend. Then they look through the telescope and see Brew the Witch.
51	"The Shark In The Bath"	17 April 1985
The Spoon family and Egbert visit Button Moon. Tina and Mr Spoon see lots of bubbles floating in Blanket Sky. Small Bottle plays a trick on Captain Large and puts a toy shark in the bath. Then they look through the telescope and see a cockerel that doesn't crow.
52	"The Paper Parade"	24 April 1985
Tina is very excited to see the paper parade on Button Moon. Queenie Jelly and Monsieur Blancmange are happy that the Spoon family will act as judges. Vacuum Cleaner is sad because he doesn't have a fancy dress costume for the parade, but he's not sad for long.

=== Series 5 (1986) ===
No.	Title	Original release date
53	"A Hole In Blanket Sky"	7 January 1986
On the way to Button Moon, the Spoon family get caught in a traffic jam. When they finally land on Button Moon, they see Queenie Jelly who watches penguins dance on a cake. Through the telescope, they see Bertie and Gertie who use three wishes to go to the fun fair.
54	"Egbert Wants To Help"	14 January 1986
Mrs Spoon is busy cleaning the car, Mr Spoon is building a bookcase for his daughter, and Tina needs some help cleaning up. Egbert comes to the rescue...or does he.
55	"Tutti Frutti Ice Cream"	21 January 1986
Mrs Spoon, Tina and Egbert visit an ice cream factory to see how ice cream is made. After their visit, they blast off for Button Moon in the spaceship and see the toys playing in the sand box.
56	"Granny Spoon and the Missing Apple Pie"	28 January 1986
Granny Spoon is visiting, and they are all going for a picnic on Button Moon. Tina has got some chocolate creams for Granny Spoon, but she has lost her apple pie.
57	"Rain Stopped Play"	4 February 1986
Mr Spoon takes Tina and Egbert on a trip to Button Moon while Daddy Egbert and Mrs Spoon watch the football match on ITV. However, it is raining when they get there, and so the voyagers, Rag Doll and Freddy Teddy have to preoccupy themselves indoors.
58	"Bottle Party"	11 February 1986
Captain Large is holding a party on Button Moon. Little Bottle offers to help Small Bottle with the preparations while he attempts to get an invite.
59	"Paperchase On Button Moon"	18 February 1986
Mr and Mrs Spoon and Tina watch The Umbrella Ballet on their way to Button Moon. The Spoons play a game with Rag Doll, Freddy Teddy, and Small Bottle where they each follow a trail of paper until one of them wins a prize.
60	"Winter Sports For The Frozen Vegetables"	25 February 1986
Cotton wool snow has covered the Spoons home. Daddy Egbert sets about making a toboggan while the rest of the Spoon family clear the snow ready for take-off to Button Moon. When Mr Spoon, Egbert and Tina Tea-spoon arrive on Button Moon the vegetables are practicing some winter sports.
61	"Ding-A-Ling Ice Cream"	4 March 1986
Whilst Mrs Spoon stays at home to lay some carpet in the spare bedroom, Mr spoon takes Tina and Egbert to Button Moon. There, Rag Doll and Freddy Teddy go around a safari park and meet Clockwork Mouse and see lions, elephants, crocodiles and giraffes. Later, they see Egbert's father has broken down in his ice cream van, but Egbert has no problem convincing Mr Spoon to help out.
62	"Blue Button Moon"	11 March 1986
Captain Large is painting the pipes on Button Moon when the Spoon family arrives. Helping him are Little and Small Bottle. Suddenly, there is an accident, and yellow Button Moon is streaked with blue paint. Through the telescope, Brew the witch has gone to the cinema with Thunder the dragon – and strange things seem to happen.
63	"Crazy Games"	18 March 1986
Mr Spoon is too busy playing a computer game to do the chores. The family takes a trip to Button Moon where The Wibbly Wobbly Man holds a competition involving cream cakes. Meanwhile, Thunder the Dragon and Brew have to do their own chores or there will be no dinner.
64	"The Royal Handkerchief Ballet"	25 March 1986
Mr and Mrs Spoon attend the Button Moon theater to watch the Swan Dance performed by the White Handkerchief ballet. Queenie Jelly also plans on attending so Captain Large and Small Bottle get the red carpet ready.
65	"The Holiday Weekend"	1 April 1986
The Spoon family visit the fun fair where they have a go on all the amusement rides, taste all the food and try their hand at some games of chance.

=== Series 6 (1987) ===
No.	Title	Original release date
66	"The Good Luck Bird"	6 January 1987
Mrs Spoon and Vanilla take Tina and Egbert to Button Moon museum. There they learn the history of Blanket Sky, and the origins of Button Moon. Through the telescope, they see Scruffy and Basil playing a game in the garden, whilst Simon the tortoise is trying to sleep.
67	"Hose On Charlie's Nose"	13 January 1987
Captain Large and Small Bottle, helped by Elsie and Charlie Tap, are spring-cleaning Button Moon. Soap suds are all over the place and everyone wonders whether Button Moon will be cleaned in time for the visit by Mr Spoon and Tina.
68	"Planet Doughnut"	20 January 1987
On their way to Button Moon, Mr Spoon and Tina have a remarkable adventure when they get lost in the fog and arrive on Planet Doughnut. Through the telescope, they see Brew the witch having a difficult time with Thunder the dragon and the Flying Bat Clock.
69	"Rag Doll Has A Cold"	27 January 1987
When the Spoon family arrive on Button Moon, they find Rag Doll ill in bed. They cheer her up by letting her look through the telescope. She sees a jungle story about a snappy crocodile.
70	"Honeymoon"	3 February 1987
Tom Tub has married Caramel, and as a wedding present, Mr Spoon has taken them to Button Moon. Here they meet Captain Large and members of the Bottle Army who are getting ready for a holiday.
71	"Mrs Spoon's Jumble Sale"	10 February 1987
Before they go off to Button Moon, Tina and Egbert help the Scouts to get ready for a jumble sale to raise money for a new Scout hut.
72	"Buttonhole Pond"	17 February 1987
Tina, Egbert and Mr Spoon have an exciting day on Button Moon. First they go for a lovely trip on Buttonhole Pond. Then they look through the telescope to Cherry Tree Farm where Peggity the little red hen is being spied on by the sly fox.
73	"Missing Martha Muggins"	24 February 1987
When the Spoon family arrive on Button Moon, they find Martha Muggins having a bath in the sink. When she sees a mouse in the herb garden, she suddenly goes missing.
74	"Barn Dance"	3 March 1987
The Spoon family get dressed up for a barn dance on Button Moon but must first get their spaceship washed. When they land on Button Moon, they are greeted by Reggie Veggie who has made some corn dollies.
75	"Bobbing Bottle"	10 March 1987
On their trip to Button Moon, Mr Spoon and Tina meet the Bottles who are off to the Button Moon Baths for a swim. Tina also goes for a paddle with Little Bottle before setting off for home.
76	"Cows On Button Moon"	17 March 1987
Mr and Mrs Spoon take Tina to Button Moon and discover that Freddy Teddy has gone camping. The camp site is in Candlewick Field, but it is also the field where the cows live, and they come to visit.
77	"Cinders and the Magic Beans"	24 March 1987
Rag Doll and Freddy Teddy are putting on a play. The Spoon family attend and watch them perform Cinders and the magic beans, a combination of Jack and the Beanstalk, and Cinderella. Rag Doll plays Cinders and Freddy Teddy plays the fairy godmother.
78	"Queenie Jelly Loses Her Cherries"	31 March 1987
Jammy Doughnut tells Mr Spoon that Queenie Jelly has lost her cherries, and no one can find them. The Napkins do a fan dance to try and cheer Queenie up. A marshmallow penguin finds a cherry pie which has so many cherries in it that it’s able to share some with Queenie. The sugar elephants put the cherries back on a grateful Queenie Jelly.

=== Series 7 (1988) ===
No.	Title	Original release date
79	"Boat Race"	8 September 1988
Mrs Spoon and Tina blast off for Button Moon, whilst Mr Spoon stays at home to cook dinner. On Button Moon, they watch Freddy Teddy, Rag Doll, and Wibbly Wobbly Man have a boat race on Blue Ribbon River.
80	"Vacuum Cleaner For Sale"	15 September 1988
Vacuum Cleaner is having trouble sucking up the sweet papers the litter bugs have left around on Button Moon. Captain Large sends for a new cosmic cleaner instead, but not everything works out well. All of the bottles are sad to hear that their friend has left and want him to come back.
81	"Benny Bin"	22 September 1988
Freddy Teddy and Rag Doll are baking a Button Moon cake, but Benny Bin ends up eating it after Little Bottle tidies up the mess. Mr Spoon looks through the telescope and sees Brew the witch painting a picture of some fruit.
82	"Little Bottle Floats Away"	29 September 1988
It's very windy as the Spoons visit Button Moon. Captain Large starts a game of hide and seek, but the only place Little Bottle can find to hide is in a hot air balloon, which considering the weather may not be the safest place for him to be. Little Bottle gets blown away in to Blanket Sky. Mr Spoon and his family come to the rescue in their spaceship and Little Bottle is taken safely home.
83	"Talent Show"	6 October 1988
The Spoon family and Egbert land on Button Moon to watch a talent show. Whilst Little Bottle is nervous and gets stage fright, Rag Doll is determined to win at all costs with her dance routine, but she has strong opposition from Mr and Mrs Dawn Dew, Toffee the Clown and the Pencils from Button Moon School.
84	"Mr and Mrs Spoon's Anniversary"	13 October 1988
It's Mr and Mrs Spoon's wedding anniversary, and Mr Spoon is going to take his wife to the Button Moon theatre to watch a performance of 'The Paper Garden'. Daddy Egbert and Vanilla bring the Spoon's some flowers, so the Spoon's ask them to join them.
85	"Mice Play On Button Moon"	20 October 1988
The Skittle Mice are having a holiday on Button Moon, but they are being naughty and upsetting everyone.
86	"Dotty Teapot"	27 October 1988
Mr and Mrs Spoon, Tina and Egbert fly to Button Moon to join Queenie Jelly who is having a Tea Dance, but Dotty Teapot is late. Dotty tries to expedite matters by wearing a pair of roller skates, but it only makes things worse, and the Spoon family has to help Dotty.
87	"Rag Doll Moves House"	3 November 1988
Rag Doll decides she wants a change of scenery, so she calls up Captain Large and Small Bottle to help her move house. Even though she hasn't told him yet, she plans to move in with her friend Freddy Teddy.
88	"What's The Matter With Marrow?"	10 November 1988
The Spoon family and Egbert fly to Button Moon to find Reggie Veggie trying to help his friend Marrow get rid of his root rot. Reggie Veggie pours Marrow a bath and puts in powder that will cure him, but Marrow runs off. Mr and Mrs Spoon and Egbert look through the telescope and see Thunder the dragon who finds a spell in Brew's book of spells to change the wallpaper in his bedroom.
89	"Egbert's Birthday"	17 November 1988
It's Egbert's birthday, and Mr Spoon and Tina decide to take him to Button Moon, whilst Mrs Spoon decorates the house in streamers for his birthday party. On Button Moon, everyone is dressed as nursery rhyme characters. Captain Large is Old Mother Hubbard, Small Bottle is Wee Willie Winkie and Rag Doll tells the nursery Rhyme – Mary Had a Little Cow. When Captain Large goes to give Egbert his present, he finds that someone has stolen it.
90	"Cold Cows On Button Moon"	24 November 1988
The Spoon family land on Button Moon to find it is covered with snow. Through the telescope, they see Freddy Teddy trying to get food to the cows, but because of the weather, the Rainbow Book Tunnel has frozen over, meaning Freddy Teddy has to find another way of getting the hay to the cows. Rag Doll brings them some Wellington boots to keep them warm.
91	"The Snoring Princess"	1 December 1988
Aka Panto on Button Moon. Freddy Teddy, Rag Doll and the Wibble Wobble family are holding a panto at the Button Moon Theatre called 'The Snoring Princess'.

== Home Media ==
=== VHS ===
VHS title	Release date	Episodes
Button Moon (TV9947)	17 July 1987	"The Good Luck Bird", "Persian Market", "Barn Dance", "Music in the Air", "Cinders and the Magic Beans"
Picnic on Button Moon (TV9965)	5 October 1987	"Picnic on Button Moon", "The Cake Fairy Goes Skating", "Happy Birthday Mrs Spoon", "Tutti Fruitti Ice Cream", "The Royal Handkerchief Ballet"
Winter Sports on Button Moon (TV9989)	5 October 1987	"The Holiday Weekend", "Bottle Party", "Queenie Jelly Loses Her Cherries", "Blue Button Moon", "Winter Sports for the Frozen Vegetables"
Button Moon: Sticky Sweets + The Paper Parade (TV8000 & TV8001)	5 October 1987	"Sticky Sweets", "The Spaceship Breaks Down", "Egbert Goes to Button Moon", "Playing Games on Button Moon", "The Gravy Boat", "The Paper Parade", "Banana Birds", "Egbert Goes Camping", "Pink and Purple Dinosaur", "The Shark in the Bath"
Children's Favourites - Volume 2 (TV8011)	1 February 1988	"Cows on Button Moon", "Buttonhole Pond" (compilation VHS with Rainbow and The Sooty Show)
Touchdown on Button Moon (TV8025)	4 April 1988	"Hose on Charlie's Nose", "Planet Doughnut", "Rag Doll Has a Cold", "Mrs Spoon's Jumble Sale", "Bobbing Bottle"
A Day Trip on Button Moon (TV8039)	7 November 1988	"A Day Trip on Button Moon", "Painting the Pipes", "Freddy Teddy", "Tina Teaspoon and the School Mouse", "Queenie Jelly"
Paperchase on Button Moon (WP0001)	7 November 1988	"Paperchase on Button Moon", "Honeymoon and Ding-a-Ling Ice Cream"
Talent Show on Button Moon (TV8056)	6 February 1989	"Talent Show on Button Moon", "A Hole in Blanket Sky"
Crazy Games on Button Moon (TV8049)	24 April 1989	"Crazy Games", "Egbert Wants to Help", "Rain Stopped Play", "Granny Spoon and the Missing Apple Pie", "Missing Martha Muggins"
Looking for Button Moon (LL0028)	1 May 1989	"Looking for Button Moon", "Shoebox Station", "Rag Doll Marries a Dinosaur", "The Clown Who Lost His Smile", "Getting Away From It All"
Mice Play On Button Moon (LL0029)	1 May 1989	"Mice Play on Button Moon", "The Scouts Garden Fete", "Egbert Goes Camping", "The New Canoe", "The Little Red Hen"
Children's Favourites Vol. 3 (LL0032)	1 May 1989	"Two Sticky Mugs" (compilation VHS with Rainbow and The Sooty Show)
Children's Favourites Vol. 4 (LL0033)	1 May 1989	"Bottle Party" (compilation VHS with Rainbow and The Sooty Show)
Children's Summer Stories (TV8060)	5 June 1989	"Boat Race" (compilation VHS with Rainbow and The Sooty Show)
Panto On Button Moon (TV8072)	2 October 1989	"The Snoring Princess", "Little Bottle Floats Away", "Mr and Mrs Spoon's Anniversary", "Rag Doll Moves House", "Egbert's Birthday"
Children's Favourites: Bedtime Stories (TV8077)	6 November 1989	"Bundle and Fluff", "Scruffy at the Seaside" (compilation VHS with Rainbow and The Sooty Show)
Animals on Button Moon (TV8086)	5 February 1990	"The Three Pigs", "Billy Goat's Gruff", "The Fox and the Hen", "Scruffy and the Bone", "The Hare and the Tortoise"
Favourite Stories on Button Moon (TV8101)	6 August 1990	"Vacuum Cleaner for Sale", "Benny Bin", "Dotty Teapot", "What's the Matter with Marrow?", "Cold Cows on Button Moon"
Children's Club: Children's Favourites Re-Release (KK0005)	4 February 1991	"Bottle Party" (compilation VHS with Rainbow and The Sooty Show)
Button Moon Re-Release (KK0006)	4 February 1991	"The Good Luck Bird", "Persian Market", "Barn Dance", "Music in the Air", "Cinders and the Magic Beans"
Cult Kids Classics	2001	"A Day Trip to Button Moon" (compilation VHS with Chorlton and the Wheelies, Danger Mouse, Count Duckula, Jamie and the Magic Torch and Rainbow)
I Love Cult Kids	2002	"Button Hole Pond" (compilation VHS with Danger Mouse, Chorlton and the Wheelies, Count Duckula, Jamie and the Magic Torch, Rainbow and Cockleshell Bay)
Classic Kids Collection	2002	"Boat Race" (compilation VHS with Count Duckula, Chorlton and the Wheelies, Jamie and the Magic Torch, Danger Mouse and Rainbow)

=== DVD ===
DVD title	Release date	Notes
Adventures on Button Moon	2001	Comprised 10 episodes.
Button Moon – Boat Race	July 2009	Comprised 10 episodes.
Button Moon – Talent Show	2010	Comprised 3 episodes.
Button Moon: The Complete Collection	September 2024	Comprised all 91 episodes.

== Broadcast history ==
Button Moon originally aired between 8 December 1980 to 1 December 1988. Repeats were later made available on UK Gold (since 1993), The Children's Channel, Nick Jr. and Nick Jr. Classics. In June 2024, all episodes were made available on streaming platform ITVX as part of a Premium subscription.

Alongside the United Kingdom, the show has also been broadcast internationally:

- In New Zealand, the series was broadcast on TVNZ 1 and TVNZ 2.
- In Singapore, the series was broadcast on Mediacorp Channel 5 and Mediacorp Channel 8.
- In Spain, the series was broadcast on Telemundo.
- In Germany, the series with its English voiceovers was broadcast on the BFBS as well as its former network known as SSVC Television.
  - SSVC also broadcast the series internationally, including to the Falkland Islands, Cyprus, Gibraltar, Belize and Bosnia.
- In Zimbabwe, the series was broadcast on ZBC.
- In Kenya, the series was broadcast on VOK (now KBC since 1989).
- In Hong Kong, the series was broadcast on TVB.
- In Iceland, the series was broadcast on BBC Prime with its original English language.

== Stage Show ==
A live stage show was later conceived by Ian Allen, and was tour across England in the late 1980s and throughout the 1990s.

== Litigation ==
In 2013, Allen filed a lawsuit against Kapow Gifts and its owner, Robert Redshaw, accusing them of breaching his copyright on Button Moon and its characters. In court, he revealed the company had manufacutered memorabilia based on the show illegally in 2009, after he had refused to sell the rights to his character to Redshaw, which the United Kingdom's Trading Standards later requested be destroyed. Redshaw was found in breach of copyright, and ordered to pay compensation to Allen, along with legal costs.
