= Brian Cosgrove =

English animator, designer, director, producer and sculptor

Brian Cosgrove OBE
- Born: Brian Joseph Cosgrove; 6 April 1934 (age 92); Manchester, England
- Education: Manchester College of Art and Design
- Occupations: Animator, designer, director, producer, sculptor
- Years active: 1966–present

Brian Joseph Cosgrove OBE (born 6 April 1934) is an English animator, designer, director, producer and sculptor. With Mark Hall, he founded Cosgrove Hall Films in 1976 and produced successful animated children shows including The Wind in the Willows, Danger Mouse and Count Duckula. In 2012, he won the BAFTA Special Award.

== Early life ==
Born in Manchester, Cosgrove studied at Manchester College of Art and Design. It was there he met his future work partner Mark Hall.

== Career ==
Cosgrove started his career by producing television graphics at Granada Television. He later joined Stop Frame Productions, which his partner at Granada Television, Mark Hall founded, where he worked on many public service films, commercials for companies like TVTimes and directed and produced animated shows such as The Magic Ball and Sally And Jake.

After Stop Frame Productions was shut down, Cosgrove and Hall founded Cosgrove Hall Films, where they produced some of the most well known animated children's shows and films in Britain, such as Danger Mouse, Count Duckula, The Wind in the Willows (which would later become a 52 episode TV series), Noddy's Toyland Adventures, Bill and Ben and Fifi and the Flowertots until 2009.

In 1989, Cosgrove directed and produced the animated feature film The BFG, based on the Roald Dahl novel of the same name. According to Cosgrove, this is one of the only adaptations, based on one of Roald Dahl's novels, that Dahl himself actually liked.

When we finished, we ran a screening in Soho, and Dahl and his family came along. They were sitting at the back, and when the film finished they stood up and applauded. He could be quite vocal, Dahl, if he didn't like something. He didn't like Willy Wonka & the Chocolate Factory at all, the 1971 Gene Wilder one. So it was a real relief that he liked our film.

Since 2011, Cosgrove has been the creator and executive producer of Cosgrove Hall Fitzpatrick Entertainment.

== Personal life ==
Cosgrove is good friends with actor David Jason, who has been a collaborator on a number of his projects.

== Filmography ==
=== Film ===
Year	Title	Director	Producer	Animation/Art Department	Notes
1989	The BFG	Yes	Yes	Yes	Key animator, designer and background artist

=== Television ===
Year	Title	Director	Producer	Animation/Art Department	Notes
1966	Picture Box	Yes			Episodes: "A Calm Country River in Holland" "The Seaside Holiday"
1971–1972	The Magic Ball	Yes	Yes	Yes	
1972	Captain Noah and His Floating Zoo	Yes	Yes		TV movie
1972	Rainbow			Yes	Episodes: "Shapes" "Farm Animals"
1975	Noddy	Yes	Yes		
1976–1979	Chorlton and the Wheelies		Yes		
1976–1979	Jamie and the Magic Torch		Yes		
1978	Captain Kremmen		Yes		
1978	The Talking Parcel	Yes	Yes		TV movie
1979	Cinderella		Yes		TV movie
1980–1986	Cockleshell Bay		Yes		
1981–1992	Danger Mouse	Yes	Yes	Yes	Animator
1981	The Pied Piper of Hamelin		Yes		TV short
1983	The Wind in the Willows		Yes	Yes	TV movie Model character/sculpture designer
1984–1990	The Wind in the Willows		Yes	Yes	Model character/sculpture designer
1985-1986	Alias the Jester		Yes		
1988–1993	Count Duckula		Yes		
1989–1990	Oh, Mr. Toad		Yes	Yes	Model character/sculpture designer
1991–1992	Victor and Hugo	Yes	Yes		
1992	Noddy's Toyland Adventures		Yes		Executive producer
1992	On Christmas Eve	Yes	Yes		TV movie
1992	Truckers		Yes		Executive producer
1993	Avenger Penguins		Yes		Executive producer
1995	Fantomcat		Yes		Executive producer
1995	Oakie Doke		Yes		Executive producer
1996	Sooty's Amazing Adventures		Yes	Yes	Executive producer designer
1997	Captain Star			Yes	Animation producer
1999	Lavender Castle		Yes		Executive producer
1999	Foxbusters		Yes		
2000	Albie			Yes	Texture artist
2014–2015	Pip Ahoy!		Yes		Executive producer
2015-2016	Danger Mouse		Yes		Executive producer
2017-present	Daisy & Ollie		Yes		Executive producer

== Awards and nominations ==
Year	Award	Category	Title	Result
1983	BAFTA Award	Best Children's Programme (Entertainment/Drama)	Danger Mouse	Nominated
1984	BAFTA Award	Best Children's Programme (Entertainment/Drama)	Danger Mouse	Nominated
1984	BAFTA Award	Best Animated Film	The Wind in the Willows	Nominated
1984	BAFTA Award	Best Animated Film	Danger Mouse	Nominated
1984	BAFTA Award	Best Children's Programme (Entertainment/Drama)	The Wind in the Willows	Won
1985	BAFTA Award	Best Children's Programme (Entertainment/Drama)	The Wind in the Willows	Nominated
1985	BAFTA Award	Best Animated Film	The Wind in the Willows	Nominated
1985	BAFTA Award	Best Animated Film	Danger Mouse	Nominated
1985	CableACE Award	Children's Programming Series	Danger Mouse	Nominated
1986	BAFTA Award	Best Children's Programme (Entertainment/Drama)	The Wind in the Willows	Nominated
1986	BAFTA Award	Best Children's Programme (Entertainment/Drama)	Danger Mouse	Nominated
1986	BAFTA Award	Best Short Animated Film	Alias the Jester	Won
1986	BAFTA Award	Best Short Animated Film	The Wind in the Willows	Nominated
1986	BAFTA Award	Best Short Animated Film	Danger Mouse	Nominated
1987	BAFTA Award	Best Animated Film	The Wind in the Willows	Nominated
1987	BAFTA Award	Best Animated Film	Danger Mouse	Nominated
1988	BAFTA Award	Best Short Animated Film	The Wind in the Willows	Nominated
1988	CableACE Award	Children's Entertainment Special or Series - 8 and Younger	The Wind in the Willows	Nominated
1989	CableACE Award	Children's Entertainment Special or Series - 8 and Younger	The Wind in the Willows	Nominated
1990	BAFTA Award	Best Children's Programme (Entertainment/Drama)	The BFG	Nominated
