= Jimmy Hibbert =

British actor and writer

- Born: James Christian Hibbert; Henley-on-Thames, Oxfordshire, England
- Occupations: Actor; writer
- Years active: 1972–present
- Agent: Just Voices

James Christian Hibbert is an English actor and writer. He is best known for his voice work with the animation studio Cosgrove Hall Films.

== Early life ==
James Christian Hibbert is the eldest of three children of historian and biographer Christopher Hibbert, and Susan Hibbert. His younger brother was the late music journalist Tom Hibbert.

== Career ==
After studying drama at the University of Manchester, he met CP Lee and Bob Harding, and the three of them formed the band Alberto y Lost Trios Paranoias in 1972, with Hibbert on vocals and bass. The band called it a day in 1982, and Hibbert got his first voice acting role for the Milk Marketing Board, doing an impression of Ian Dury.

== Television ==
He has made a few on-screen acting appearances in British films and television programmes. These include:

- Coronation Street
- What the Papers Say
- Cold Feet
- The Grand
- Medics
- The Adventures of Sherlock Holmes
- Prime Suspect
- Children's Ward
- Wipe Out
- Floodtide
- Room at the Bottom
- The Practice
- Teach Yourself Gibberish
- Bloody Kids.

== Voice acting ==
His voice acting for animation includes:

- Danger Mouse (1981–1992) – Doctor Augustus P. Crumhorn III and additional voices
- The Wind in the Willows (1984–1988) – various voices
- Alias the Jester (1985–1986) – Boswell, Queen Edith, Sir Pinkly Percival and additional voices
- The Reluctant Dragon (1987) – various voices
- Count Duckula (1988–1993) – Dr. Von Goosewing, Sviatoslav the Bat and additional voices
- The BFG (1989) – various voices
- The Wind in the Willows: A Tale of Two Toads (1989) – Isambard Bearbone Toad
- Victor and Hugo (1991–1992) – Victor
- The Fool of the World and the Flying Ship (1990) – Crown Prince of Anatolia, Boris and Pyotr
- Terry Pratchett's Truckers (1992) – Vinto Pimmie and additional voices
- Fiddley Foodle Bird (1992)
- Noddy's Toyland Adventures (1992–2000) – Big Ears, Mr. Plod and additional male voices
- Avenger Penguins (1993–1994) – Bluey, Harry Slime, Bella, Brown Badly Drawn Brother, and Poodle Stink
- Albert the 5th Musketeer (1994–1995) – Albert, Athos and King Louis XIII
- The Little Polar Bear (1994) – various male characters
- Fantomcat (1995–1996) – Lindbergh the Pigeon, Vile the Bluebottle and Vinnie the Vole
- Sooty's Amazing Adventures (1996) – Scampi, Katerina and additional voices
- Dennis the Menace (1996–1998) – Jacques
- The Animal Shelf (1997–1999) – Gumpa, Woeful and Stripy
- Enid Blyton's The Magic Faraway Tree (1997) – various voices
- Father Christmas and the Missing Reindeer (1998) – various voices
- Lavender Castle (1999–2000) – Sir Squeakalot, Dr. Agon, Short Fred Ledd and Trump
- The Foxbusters (1999–2000) – Todd, Volpone, Ghengis, Rotter, Dog and additional voices
- Millionaire Dogs (1999) – Emmo, Chuffie, Dr. Quack and additional voices (English dub, uncredited)
- The Lampies (2000–2002) – Burnout, Captain Bright Light, Dustywugg, Arch Roon, and additional voices
- Bill and Ben (2001–2002) – Ben and additional voices
- Second Star to the Left (2001) – various voices
- Dr Otter (2001–2002) – Lucky, Flybread, Dunston, Mexley, Texley, and Dexley
- The King's Beard (2001) – The Babble
- Sergeant Stripes (2003–2004) – various male characters
- Little Robots (2003) – Stretchy
- Wide Eye (2003–2004) – 99, Rangatang and Wily Komodo
- Little Red Tractor (2004–2005) – Stumpy and additional voices
- The Magic Roundabout (2005) – Mr. Rusty, Mr. Grimsdale and Skeleton Guards
- The Secret Show (2007) – various voices
- The Magic Roundabout (2007) - Dylan, Mr. Rusty, Mr. McHenry, and Soldier Sam
- Chop Socky Chooks (2008–2009) – various voices
- Frankenstein's Cat (2008) – various voices
- The Pinky and Perky Show (2008–2009) – Wilberforce
- Jungle Junction (2009–2012) – Bobby
- Zigby (2010) – McMeer and Bertie (UK Version)
- Toby's Travelling Circus (2012) – various male characters
- Pip Ahoy! (2014–2018) – Hopper, Alan, Shelvis, and additional voices
- The Long Long Holiday (2015) - Priest

== Writing ==
He has written for various shows, including:

- My Parents are Aliens
- The Legends of Treasure Island
- Oakie Doke
- Sooty's Amazing Adventures
- Terry Pratchett's Discworld
- Bob the Builder
- Bill and Ben
- Andy Pandy
- Little Red Tractor
- Little Robots
- The Lampies
- The Adventures of Marco & Gina
- The Secret Show
- Shaun the Sheep
- Frankenstein's Cat
- Chuggington
- The Octonauts
- Pip Ahoy!
- Mr. Bean: The Animated Series
- The Roly Mo Show
- Planet Cook

== Music videos ==
He appeared in Lunar C's 2017 music video Chicken, playing Lunar C's "uncle Daz," along with Stephanie Nuttal who played Lunar C's "mum."

== Theatre ==
In 1977, he appeared on stage at London's Royal Court Theatre and Roundhouse as part of the Albertos' musical play Sleak, playing the lead role of Norman Sleak.
