= Rosemary Anne Sisson =

English television dramatist and novelist

- Born: 13 October 1923; Enfield Town, Middlesex, England
- Died: 28 July 2017 (aged 93); London, England
- Education: University College London; Newnham College, Cambridge
- Occupations: Novelist, Television Dramatist

Rosemary Anne Sisson (13 October 1923 – 28 July 2017) was an English television dramatist and novelist. She was described by playwright Simon Farquhar in 2014 as being "one of television's finest period storytellers", and in 2017 fellow dramatist Ian Curteis referred to her as "the Miss Marple of British playwriting".

== Early life ==
Sisson was born in Enfield Town, Middlesex to Shakespeare scholar Charles Jasper Sisson (1885–1966), Lord Northcliffe Professor of Modern English Literature at the University of London, who edited the complete works of Shakespeare and published a textual study, New Readings in Shakespeare, and his wife Vera Kathleen (1895–1995), daughter of David George Ginn. She had an elder sister. She attended Cheltenham Ladies' College, where she developed a love of literature. She started reading English at University College London during the Second World War and took a two-year hiatus from her course to volunteer for the Royal Observer Corps. She returned to the college at the age of 21 to finish her BA degree, and in due course graduated.

== Career ==
=== Pre-writing career ===
Sisson initially embarked on an academic career. Destitute after the war, Sisson found a job teaching a course on English literature at the University of Wisconsin. She returned to England to complete an MLitt at Newnham College, Cambridge, and became a lecturer at UCL from 1950 to 1954 and at the University of Birmingham from 1954 to 1955.

When the Shakespeare Institute was founded at Stratford-upon-Avon in 1951, her father was appointed as the deputy director of the institute. Sisson subsequently became a drama critic for the Stratford Herald for two years.

=== Works for television and film ===
While Sisson was working as a drama critic, Richard Burton's performance as Prince Hal in Henry V led her to take an interest in the affair between King Henry V's widow Catherine of Valois and Sir Owen Tudor, inspiring her to write the play The Queen and the Welshman in iambic pentameter. The play was performed at the Edinburgh Festival Fringe with a cast including Edward Woodward as Owen Tudor and Frank Finlay as the Gaoler. The Queen and the Welshman transferred to the Lyric, Hammersmith, in 1957 and was well received. William Aubrey Darlington, drama critic of The Daily Telegraph, praised Sisson's "keen nose for stories that are both true to actuality and to stage affect." The play was broadcast several times, including a television production in 1958. When John Wiles adapted The Queen and the Welshman for this version, Sisson sat next to him and asked questions about the art of writing television screenplays. The play was also adapted as a Theatre 625 production in 1966. This was thought to have been lost, but it was found in 2010 to have been deposited with the Library of Congress.

Sisson's other plays include A Ghost on Tiptoe, co-written with the actor Robert Morley, which had a run at the Savoy Theatre in 1974. She contributed scripts to the television series The Six Wives of Henry VIII (1970), Elizabeth R (1971), Upstairs, Downstairs (1972–75), The Duchess of Duke Street (1976–77), and A Dorothy L. Sayers Mystery (1987). She collaborated on the screenplays for the Disney films Candleshoe (1977), The Watcher in the Woods (1980) and The Black Cauldron (1985). She wrote screenplays for a few projects for British animation studio Cosgrove Hall in the late 1970s and early 1980s, she completed adaptations of The Talking Parcel (1978), Robert Browning's poem of The Pied Piper of Hamelin (1980) and The Wind in the Willows. She also wrote six episodes for the first series of the subsequent television series based on The Wind in the Willows, which followed on from her film adaptation. Three episodes were based on chapters from Kenneth Grahame's original book that were omitted from the film adaptation, and she also wrote three original stories; the other episodes were written by Cosgrove Hall's main writer at the time, Brian Trueman. Sisson also wrote several episodes of The Young Indiana Jones Chronicles (1992–93).

=== Books ===
Sisson wrote several novels for adults, including The Excise Man in 1972 and The Stratford Story in 1975. She also wrote books for children, including The Adventures of Ambrose in 1951 and The Impractical Chimney Sweep in 1956.

In 1995 Radcliffe published Rosemary for Remembrance, a collection of Sisson's poetry and prose.

=== Other work ===
Sisson was scriptwriter for several military tattoos, including the VE Day 50th anniversary celebrations in Hyde Park and the Royal Military Tattoo 2000. For this work she was awarded the Prince Michael of Kent Award, for Services to Soldiers, Sailors and Air Force Association

Sisson worked with the Writers' Guild of Great Britain for over three decades. She was co-chairman from 1979 to 1980 (with Bruce Stewart) and president from 1995 to 1999. In this latter role, Sisson was instrumental in forging an agreement with the BBC about the level of involvement a writer has in a production of their scripts. Sisson was an honorary secretary of the Dramatists' Club who meet at the Garrick Club, and was a member of BAFTA from 1995. She had become the first female full member of the Dramatists' Club in 1974, and wrote a history of the body for its 100th anniversary in 2009.

== Personal life ==
Sisson never married, explaining in an interview with The Daily Telegraph: "If I'd met the man I could have loved at any time up to the age of 30 I would have done it - I would have loved to have had children. But I read a poem which said: 'In my thirtieth year came all my spirit home to me.' And I remember thinking - Yes. I'm settled now. I feel at home with myself." Known as Romy to her friends and family, Sisson was a devoted aunt and great aunt, and was made godmother to her sister's family. She took care of both her parents until they died; her mother Vera lived to be 100 years old.

Sisson was an Anglican. She was involved with the British Prayer Book Society and judged the Cranmer Award for several years.

== Death ==
Sisson died peacefully in her London home on 28 July 2017 at the age of 93. A memorial service for her was held in London in October 2017.

== Filmography ==
=== Film ===
Sisson was asked to write screenplays for several Disney films:

- Ride a Wild Pony (1975)
- Escape from the Dark (1976, aka The Littlest Horse Thieves)
- Candleshoe (1977)
- The Watcher in the Woods (1980), which she co-wrote with Brian Clemens and Harry Spalding
- The Black Cauldron (1985)

=== Television credits ===
- The Ordeal of Richard Feverel (1964)
- Upstairs, Downstairs, for which she wrote 11 episodes
- The Talking Parcel (1978 animated film)
- The Wind in the Willows (1983 animated film)
- The Wind in the Willows (1984) animated TV series, continuation of the above film.
- Follyfoot
- Together
- The Irish R.M.
- The Six Wives of Henry VIII, the episode concerning the King's marriage to Catherine of Aragon
- The Shadow of the Tower (Henry VII), two episodes
- Elizabeth R, the episode The Marriage Game
- The Duchess of Duke Street
- A Town Like Alice (1981 miniseries)
- Manions of America
- A Dorothy L. Sayers Mystery (TV Series, 1987) Lord Peter Wimsey
- The Bretts (1987–88), which Sisson co-created with Frank Marshall
- The Young Indiana Jones Chronicles, on which she co-wrote screenplays with George Lucas
