= Fantomcat =

- Genre: Adventure; Animation; Comedy drama Superhero
- Created by: Andy Roper
- Developed by: Anglia Television
- Written by: Roger Stennett; Jimmy Hibbert; Keith Smith; Maggie Fox; Sue Ryding; Stefan Redfern; Rob Rackstraw; Peter Richard Reeves; Lorelei King
- Directed by: Ben Turner; Andy Roper
- Starring: Robert Powell; Lorelei King; Rob Rackstraw; Jimmy Hibbert
- Composer: Phil Bush
- Country of origin: United Kingdom
- Original language: English
- No. of series: 2
- No. of episodes: 26

Production
- Executive producers: Brian Cosgrove; Mark Hall
- Producers: Ben Turner; Andy Roper
- Running time: 22 min.
- Production company: Cosgrove Hall Films

Original release
- Network: ITV (CITV)
- Release: 7 September 1995 – 18 December 1996

Fantomcat is a British animated series produced by Cosgrove Hall Films. It was first broadcast between 7 September 1995 and 18 December 1996, and was animated by Alfonso Productions, a Spanish animation studio also responsible for animating and bringing Cosgrove Hall's shows Count Duckula, Victor and Hugo: Bunglers in Crime, Avenger Penguins, Sooty's Amazing Adventures and The Foxbusters to life, Milimetros, another Spanish animation studio, and in-house by Cosgrove Hall themselves. It aired largely on Children's ITV. The series also had a run on Pop from 2003 to 2005.

It was the first Cosgrove Hall cartoon to be animated with a process called Animo, wherein the animation drawings were scanned and then digitally coloured on computers. The first season was produced and directed by Ben Turner, while the second and final season was produced and directed by its creator, Andy Roper.

== Influences ==
The main character of Fantomcat was influenced heavily by Zorro, Errol Flynn and Fantômas, and the series itself was influenced by Batman: The Animated Series and the time-lost approach of both Adam Adamant Lives! and Gargoyles.

== Plot ==
Fantomcat centres on the character Phillipe L'Entrique Elan de Chanel, Count Givenchy and Duke of Fantom, a.k.a. Fantomcat, a masked swashbuckling hero who thrives on 31 December 1699 in mortal combat with his nemesis Baron von Skelter, a sword-wielding caped Skeletoid alchemist. But Von Skelter is not alone in Castle Fantom, as he has brought with him two of his henchmen. During the battle, Phillipe is treacherously cast into a painting within the halls of his home, Castle Fantom, by Von Skelter's henchmen with the Crystal of Malevolence, a stone so powerful that it can change worlds. As his clock strikes midnight, he becomes trapped in the painting for three centuries while Von Skelter stole his Ring of the Fantoms and his sword, Touché.

As time passed, the area around Castle Fantom becomes a bustling metropolis called Metrocity, a city submerged in crime rings led by the fiendish arachnid Marmagora. Eventually, at midnight on 31 December 1999, Fantomcat is freed from the painting by the Wildcat Detectives when they take a wrong turning into the castle while chasing two explosive-wielding reptiles.

On 1 January 2000, Fantomcat joins the Wildcat Detectives in their battle against Marmagora and her henchmen, who have used another Crystal of Malevolence to summon Baron von Skelter into the modern day and join her as her partner in a new world order. Fantomcat and the Wildcat Detective Agency defeat Marmagora's henchmen, and blow up Baron Von Skelter with the two Crystals of Malevolence. Although the Baron has been defeated, Marmagora is still hanging around, and the battle will continue another day.

== Characters ==
=== Heroes ===
- Phillipe L'Entrique Elan de Chanel, Count Givenchy and Duke of Fantom (voiced by Robert Powell) - The main protagonist of the series. A masked, swashbuckling, polite and fearless hero who joins the Wildcat Detectives after his release and is nicknamed Fantomcat. Fantomcat is naturally completely oblivious to the modern world and its various new technologies, which can hinder him and the detective team if he is not careful. Fantomcat has a sword called Touché which can respond to his beck and call, has been with him all his nine lives, and was made from the same metal that his great grandfather's sword was made from. He can also turn invisible with the help of his Ring of the Fantoms, a ring a thousand years old whose powers have helped Fantomcat's family oppose evil down the ages. With the Ring of the Fantoms, he can act like a "Phantom" when needed. In-between adventures, he teaches MacDuff how to be a swordsman.
- Sir Randolph L'Entrique Elan de Chanel (voiced by Robert Powell) - Fantomcat's father, who is now deceased. He often appears in the form of a ghost whenever Fantomcat has lost a battle or lost one of his nine lives.
- Great Grandfather L'Entrique Elan de Chanel (voiced by Robert Powell) - Fantomcat's great grandfather, who was killed by Nemesis during their first and final encounter. Like Fantomcat's father, he appeared to Fantomcat in the form of a ghost.
- Tabitha "Tabs" Wildcat (voiced by Lorelei King) - A stern female detective and leader of the Wildcat Detective Agency, she has a crush on Fantomcat. Her younger sister is Ginger Wildcat, who is the head of the New York Police Department and also has a crush on Fantomcat. She is known as Penelope "Penny" Wildcat in some foreign dubs.
- MacDuff the Mouse (voiced by Rob Rackstraw) - A timid member of the Detective Team, who hates holes. His real name is Claude, though as it embarrasses him, he prefers to be called MacDuff. He is also a swordsman-in-training.
- Lindbergh the Pigeon (voiced by Jimmy Hibbert) - A member of the Detective Team who talks in garbled, blubbering language, hates heights and therefore will not fly. Lindbergh is briefly absent in both Lady Gobbling's Gems and the Manhattan Incident.

=== Villains ===
- Marmagora (voiced by Lorelei King) - The primary villain of the series. A hideous giant widow spider intent on dominating Metrocity, she is the leader of the evil forces below Metrocity. She has a pet carnivorous plant called Gloria, who takes three weeks to digest her food, and she often feeds her henchman Vile the Bluebottle to Gloria whenever he messes up.
- Vile the Bluebottle (voiced by Jimmy Hibbert) - A fly. Marmagora's right-hand man, who does not help her much but only follows her instructions and agrees with everything she says - however, he sometimes has feelings against Marmagora. He normally wields a gun or a sword, and like all flies, can fly.
- Vinnie the Vole (voiced by Jimmy Hibbert) - One of Marmagora's henchmen, who is always ready to help. Unlike Vile, Vinnie is actually quite smart, but he always gets shunned by Vile.
- Vomit the Fly (voiced by Jimmy Hibbert) - Vile's cousin. He is also Marmagora's "spy in the sky fly", and far smaller than Vile.
- The Crab Twins (voiced by Jimmy Hibbert and Rob Rackstraw) - Two of Marmagora's second division boys, called Jack and Arthur. They normally wield crowbars and baseball bats, and often target rich people. They are also very good swimmers.
- Baron Hugo von Skelter (voiced by Rob Rackstraw) - A sword-wielding caped Skeletoid alchemist who imprisoned Fantomcat for 3 centuries and was summoned over to the present day by Marmagora to finish his heinous conquest. He was formerly a bison scientist, but after experimenting alchemy on himself, he became a Skeletoid set upon the path of evil. He was thought dead after being defeated by Fantomcat in the first episode, but he survived and is now waiting for his revenge on him.
- The Monitor (voiced by Rob Rackstraw) - An intergalactic space villain who talks like Shere Khan and destroys planets with a giant laser on his asteroid spaceship. He was thought dead after being sucked out into space in his first appearance, but as he can breathe in space, he survived, and is now waiting for his revenge on Fantomcat.
- Lurk (voiced by Jimmy Hibbert) - One of the Monitor's henchmen, who is a Cockney lizard. He's typically little help, but he has the odd bright moment or two.
- Nemesis (voiced by Jimmy Hibbert) - A demon warrior created by a powerful sorcerer in order to wipe out Fantomcat's great-grandfather and ravage the land. He was defeated, but at the cost of Fantomcat's great-grandfather's life. He is again summoned by Marmagora in the form of a Sodium-filled giant robot, and is again defeated with a water cannon. He is fought by MacDuff when Fantomcat ends up in a radiation accident, and once again by MacDuff when Blaine Bunion accidentally summons him. He can be summoned with the incantation "Galiostro acapelto maponos asmodeos azazel!"

=== Other characters ===
- Bunty the Mouse (voiced by Jimmy Hibbert) - MacDuff's older brother, who is an inept inventor. He has a habit of calling MacDuff by his real name, which irritates him.
- Leandra Bagshot (voiced by Lorelei King) - MacDuff's girlfriend, who is unaware of her boyfriend's life as a detective thwarting Marmagora's schemes.
- Police Chief Axel Schmiere (voiced by Rob Rackstraw) - The chief of the Metrocity Police Department, who enjoys eating hamburgers and is scared of Fantomcat.
- Hiram "Big" Bucks (voiced by Robert Powell) - Metrocity's biggest billionaire, who owns every industrial business in the city.
- The Mayor (voiced by Jimmy Hibbert) - The mayor of Metrocity, who is rather geeky and cowardly, and often works alongside Hiram "Big" Bucks.
- Rash Blackhead (voiced by Jimmy Hibbert) - A reporter for Metrocity News Flash who is a big fan of Fantomcat and the Wildcat Detectives.

== Episodes ==
=== Season 1 (1995) ===
No.	Title	Villains	Directed by	Written by	Original release date	Prod. code
1	"The Hero Returns"	Marmagora and Baron von Skelter	Ben Turner	Keith Smith	7 September 1995	B212646
While chasing two explosive-wielding reptiles, the Wildcat Detectives are launched into Castle Fantom where Tabs accidentally frees Fantomcat from a portrait. Our hero briefs them about his imprisonment and joins the Wildcat Detectives in their pursuit for Marmagora, who has summoned Baron von Skelter to join her. Fantomcat strikes him down once and for all...or does he?
2	"The Preying Mantis"	Marmagora, The Crab Twins and The Monk	Ben Turner	Keith Smith	14 September 1995	B212647
Marmagora has recruited The Monk to deal with Fantomcat. Meanwhile the Wildcat Detectives thwart a raid on a rich French fox by the Crab Twins. On the next day, the Monk kidnaps Tabs to lure Fantomcat to a trap at the Royal Botanical Gardens in Metro Park, but with the aid of his Ring of the Fantoms, Fantomcat defeats The Monk.
3	"The Swords of the Scorpion"	Marmagora and Scorpio	Ben Turner	Rob Rackstraw and Stefan Redfern	21 September 1995	B212648
A warrior called Scorpio thwarts Metrocity's crimes. It is just to make Fantomcat look like a fool, give up swordplay and take up knitting, but the Wildcat Detectives catch wind of Marmagora's plot to raid the Metrocity Gold Reserve, so Fantomcat emerges from his defeat to beat Scorpio and prevent an atomic explosion that will cause a total eclipse of Metrocity.
4	"The Aeroship"	Marmagora	Ben Turner	Maggie Fox and Sue Ryding	28 September 1995	B212649
Marmagora hijacks Hiram "Big" Bucks' Aeroship, the Big One, to use as the perfect getaway vehicle for raids on the Metrocity Central Bank. The Wildcat Detectives board the Aeroship and in an ensuing fight, Vile causes the Aeroship to self-destruct, but the Wildcat Detectives are able to thwart Marmagora's heist.
5	"The Asteroid Adventure"	The Monitor	Ben Turner	Peter Richard Reeves	5 October 1995	B212650
Tabs is abducted by the Monitor, and she is taken to his asteroid base in outer space. His interest is for Fantomcat to find a crystal shard by following cryptic clues. After finding it at the Metrocity Museum, Fantomcat infiltrates the asteroid base, disrupts the Monitor's plan and rescues Tabs.
6	"The Mind Leech"	Marmagora	Ben Turner	Jimmy Hibbert	12 October 1995	B212651
Professor Oliphant from the Institute of Advanced Particle Analysis gets taken by Marmagora's giant beetles to reveal his secrets of transporting living matter with a mechanical mind leech. Fantomcat follows Tabs and Lindbergh's trail, but while attempting to cross a rocky bridge, Fantomcat ends up plummeting down the cavern below it and is almost killed. After a revival by the spirit of his father, Fantomcat rescues his friends and Professor Oliphant from their captors. NOTE: It was no episode shown on 19 October 1995 due to them being special programmes to celebrate (C)ITV's 40th birthday anniversary week.
7	"Lady Gobbling’s Gems"	Marmagora and Hedouni the Hypnotist	Ben Turner	Maggie Fox and Sue Ryding	26 October 1995	B212652
At Lady Gobbling's castle ball, Hedouini the Hypnotist and Vinnie the Vole put the party guests in a trance to steal their jewellery for Marmagora. Fantomcat gets caught by them, but he escapes, counters Marmagora and retrieves the stolen jewellery. NOTE: Lindbergh is absent.
8	"Great Balls of Fire"	Marmagora and The Mina Tiger	Ben Turner	Roger Stennett	2 November 1995	B212653
Comet Caractacus flies over the Earth, and deep beneath Castle Fantom arises the Mina Tiger, which confronts Fantomcat and tries to kill him in a battle. Fantomcat manages to get the Mina Tiger destroyed by a bolt of lightning.
9	"The Chameleons of Death"	Marmagora and The Chameleon Brothers	Ben Turner	Rob Rackstraw and Stefan Redfern	9 November 1995	B212655
Marmagora steals a Dark Particle from the Institute of Advanced Particle Analysis, because she needs it to power her new Spectro-Vac. It blows up because Vile fitted the wrong fuse. Marmagora sends the Chameleon Brothers to steal Fantomcat's ring, costing the life of one of them. Tabs and the detectives track Marmagora's goons, prevent the Spectro-Vac from its test phase and Fantomcat finishes off the other Chameleon.
10	"The Crystal of Nemesis"	Marmagora and Nemesis	Ben Turner	Jimmy Hibbert	16 November 1995	B212654
Marmagora steals the ancient Crystal of Nemesis from the Metrocity Museum, which may spell Fantomcat's end at the hand of the demon warrior Nemesis in the form of a Sodium-filled giant robot. The Wildcat Detectives help Fantomcat to destroy Nemesis once and for all with a water cannon.
11	"The Eye of Harakti"	Marmagora, The Crab Twins and Rahr	Ben Turner	Peter Richard Reeves	23 November 1995	B212657
At the Blue Sphinx Club, Marmagora calls upon Rahr, an evil Egyptian god with a stone sphere called "The Eye of Harakti", which can destroy anything at midnight. With it, Marmagora tries to destroy a truck belonging to Hiram "Big" Bucks and carrying a supply of gold bars.
12	"Where the Heart Is"	Marmagora and Baron von Skelter	Ben Turner	Keith Smith	30 November 1995	B212658
While on a skiing vacation, Fantomcat starts feeling homesick and wants to return to his own time. However, Baron von Skelter, disguised as a Yeti, is hiding on the ski slopes wanting revenge on both Fantomcat and Marmagora. After defeating Baron von Skelter again, Fantomcat decides that his true home is with his friends in the 21st century (at the end of the 20th century).
13	"The Web of Doom"	Marmagora	Ben Turner	Roger Stennett	7 December 1995	B212656
Marmagora is at large once again, covering Metrocity with a giant web. Fantomcat and MacDuff have to navigate their way across Metrocity to shut down the machine generating it, while fighting Marmagora's spiderbots which are robbing Metrocity of its money at the same time, but have they been lured into a trap?

=== Season 2 (1996) ===
No.	Title	Villains	Directed by	Written by	Original release date	Prod. code
1	"Once Upon a Time Machine"	Duke Brumlock	Andy Roper	Roger Stennett	23 October 1996	DB213243
Fantomcat and MacDuff have an accident with the PAWS Virtual Reality Programme at the Metrocity Science Museum. They must complete a quest, replaying an event from Jungfrau Night 1666 to get home. But first, Fantomcat needs to think back 334 years and remember what he did.
2	"The Manhattan Incident"	Dr. Butyrik	Andy Roper	Roger Stennett	30 October 1996	DB213244
Ginger, the chief of the New York Police Department (and Tabs' sister), enlists Tabs' help in catching Dr. Butyrik, a scientist with a literal Jekyll and Hyde complex attempting to destroy Manhattan with a Protogen 6 powered rocket bomb. NOTE: Lindbergh is absent, much like Lady Gobbling's Gems.
3	"Cinema Purradiso"	Marmagora and Don Ratso	Andy Roper	Lorelei King	6 November 1996	DB213245
Don Ratso and his fellow rats try and bribe Signor Moustriani, the owner of the Cinema Purradiso, into selling the cinema to them, as it is a nice supply of oil right underneath the cinema. Fantomcat battles them and has them arrested.
4	"MacFlash, Warrior of the Skies"	Marmagora	Andy Roper	Jimmy Hibbert	13 November 1996	DB213246
Tired of being called 'little one' and being talked down to, MacDuff runs away from Ms. Wildcat's Detective Agency, starting up his own detective service called MacDuff's Detective Agency. But with no calls coming in, he has his brother Bunty build him an indestructible bionic suit of armour with a nuclear powered thruster pack, and as a result, he begins performing good deeds as MacFlash, the Warrior of the Skies. In the meanwhile, Marmagora is planning to unleash her neutroneum powered spider tanks on Metrocity, so she plans to brainwash MacFlash to make him her slave, not realising that he is MacDuff.
5	"The Tomb of the Fantoms"	Salamander and Nemesis	Andy Roper	Jimmy Hibbert	20 November 1996	DB213247
While pursuing the criminal Salamander, Fantomcat suffers a radiation accident and believes that Fantomcat is dying, and the others help him back to Castle Fantom, where Fantomcat is confronted by the ghosts of his generations-long dead relatives who judge upon whether Fantomcat deserves to live or not. After being told how he defeated the Nemesis robot, Fantomcat's relatives decide that he is, and that in order to live again Fantomcat must win a battle against Nemesis. Fantomcat calls upon MacDuff, who will fight Nemesis for Fantomcat.
6	"Revenge of the Monitor"	The Monitor	Andy Roper	Peter Richard Reeves	27 November 1996	DB213248
Fantomcat and his friends visit the Stella View Hotel, a hotel in space, but they discover that the Monitor and his henchman Lurk are back, having escaped death and found Fantomcat's current location. The Monitor and Lurk plan to destroy the Earth with a giant laser unless Fantomcat surrenders to them. Fortunately, Fantomcat has a plan involving giant mirrors and a moonbase.
7	"The Treasure of the Belerophon"	Marmagora and The Crab Twins	Andy Roper	Stefan Redfern	4 December 1996	DB213249
Fantomcat and his friends are taken for a trip in a submarine called the Leviathan by Hiram "Big" Bucks, who is looking for a hidden million-dollar treasure in the SS Belerophone, a cruise ship that now lies in an underwater volcano. However, Vile and the Crab Twins hijack the sub, planning to steal the treasure for Marmagora.
8	"The Lonely Hearts Club"	Baron von Skelter	Andy Roper	Jimmy Hibbert	11 December 1996	DB213250
MacDuff starts going out with Leandra Bagshot, a female Scouse mouse who responded to his Lonely Hearts ad in the Metro News. Meanwhile, Tabs gets a call from Mr. Fabio Valente, to locate a missing painting. Lured to Mr. Valente's mansion with him, it turns out to be a trap by Baron von Skelter to kidnap Tabs and imprison Tabs in a painting. Fantomcat hears about it, and comes to her rescue - but has he been lured into a trap as well?
9	"The Curse of Evillia"	Marmagora and Evillia Spiritus	Andy Roper	Stefan Redfern	18 December 1996	DB213253
Marmagora has hired the evil witch Evillia Spiritus, who plans to eradicate any trace of the family Fantom from the face of the Earth. After Fantomcat is informed about it by the ghost of his father, it is now up to him and the Wildcat Detectives to find Evillia's lair up on the moors, and put a stop to Marmagora's fiendish plot - all the while avoiding the various tricks and traps Evillia has set for them.
10	"MacDuff, Private Eye"	The Spectre, Blaine Bunion and Nemesis	Andy Roper	Jimmy Hibbert	TBA	DB213252
After an ordeal with a villain known as The Spectre, the actress Martika Mazurka calls on the Wildcat Detectives to spy on her manager. She suspects that her manager, Blaine Bunion, stole her necklace that contains an amulet, which supposedly gives magical powers to its owner. However, none of the Wildcat Detectives are willing to take up the case, except for MacDuff, who sees it as an opportunity to become the greatest detective in Metrocity. But when Mazurka's manager tests the amulet by citing the incantation to summon Nemesis, it is now down to MacDuff to save Metrocity from certain destruction.
11	"The Mirror Monster"	Marmagora, Deadeye and The Mirror Monster	Andy Roper	Roger Stennett	TBA	DB213251
Marmagora creates the Mirror Monster, a tiny grey blob which can morph into any living being it chooses. The monster morphs into Fantomcat, confusing Tabs and the detectives. The monster plans to gain their trust in order to kill the real Fantomcat and afterwards, Tabs and the detectives. And to make matters worse, Marmagora also has a killer robot named Deadeye at the ready.
12	"The Incredible Shrinking Fantomcat"	Castle Fantom Spiders	Andy Roper	Peter Richard Reeves	TBA	DB213254
MacDuff is once again angry about his height after winning the Small is Beautiful Award, so he contacts his brother Bunty. He begs him to construct a machine that makes him taller. After initial hesitation, Bunty fulfills his brother's wish. At the demonstration, the new machine does not work as expected, and shrinks MacDuff, Fantomcat and Tabs. The three of them must now try to get Bunty's attention and return them to normal size - it is, if they can survive the castle's cellar...
13	"One Good Deed"	The Minotaur	Andy Roper	Roger Stennett	TBA	DB213255
Eustace Prim, a member of the Metrocity Council wants to demolish Castle Fantom and build a rubbish dump and burger bar in Metrocity. Apparently, Fantomcat's family stops paying taxes for three hundred years, so now Metrocity is the owner of Castle Fantom (Fantomcat's home). Fantomcat defends his possessions, and remembers that he has a deed which allows him ownership of the castle. But the deed has been lost, and if it is not found within 11 hours, Fantomcat's castle will be razed to the ground - and it requires a journey into the depths of the castle, where the dreaded Minotaur lurks.

== Home media ==
On 13 January 2003 in the United Kingdom, Cinema Club and Granada Media released 2 DVDs and videos of Fantomcat, one with Episodes 1 and 2, and one with Episodes 3 and 4.

Previously, in 1996, Telstar Home Entertainment released 3 videos as part of their Star Kids range.

VHS video title	Year of release	Episodes
Fantomcat: Volume 1 (TVE 3006)	13 September 1996	The Hero Returns, The Preying Mantis
Fantomcat: Volume 2 (TVE 3008)	15 November 1996	The Swords of the Scorpion, The Aeroship
Fantomcat: Volume 3 (TVE 3010)	21 May 1997	The Asteroid Adventure, The Mind Leech, Lady Gobbling's Gems

So far, the rest of the first series and the second series have not been officially released in the United Kingdom, but bootleg copies of the first and second series exist, and can be requested from ITV Viewer Requests. As of January 2022, both series were made available for streaming on BritBox.

In Serbia, Beokolp released 2 DVDs of Fantomcat, one with Episodes 14, 15, 16 and 10, and one with Episodes 5, 6, 7 and 22.

== See also ==
- Zorro
- Errol Flynn
- Fantômas
- Adam Adamant Lives!
