= The BFG (1989 film) =

1989 British animated television film

- DVD cover
- Based on: The BFG by Roald Dahl
- Screenplay by: John Hambley
- Directed by: Brian Cosgrove
- Starring: David Jason; Amanda Root; Angela Thorne; Don Henderson
- Music by: Keith Hopwood; Malcolm Rowe
- Country of origin: United Kingdom
- Original language: English

Production
- Executive producer: John Hambley
- Producers: Mark Hall; Brian Cosgrove
- Editor: Nigel Rutter
- Running time: 91 minutes
- Production company: Cosgrove Hall Productions
- Budget: £3 million

Original release
- Network: ITV
- Release: 25 December 1989

Roald Dahl's The BFG, or simply The BFG, is a 1989 British animated fantasy adventure made-for-television film, directed by Brian Cosgrove and starring David Jason from a screenplay by John Hambley based on the 1982 novel The BFG by Roald Dahl.

Roald Dahl's The BFG debuted in the United Kingdom on 25 December 1989, on ITV. The film was dedicated to animator George Jackson, who had worked on numerous Cosgrove Hall Productions projects prior to his death in 1986. The film is also the last role of Ballard Berkeley (the voice of the Head of the Army), who died in 1988.

== Plot ==
Sophie is a young orphaned girl living in the orphanage of the cantankerous and abusive Mrs. Clonkers, as her parents both died when she was a baby. One night, Sophie wakes up and looks out of a window to see a cloaked, elderly giant blowing something through a trumpet into a bedroom window down the street. The Giant notices her and snatches her through the window, carrying her away to a mysterious realm known as "Giant Country".

In his cave, the giant identifies himself as the Big Friendly Giant (or BFG for short) who blows dreams into the bedrooms of children at night, while all the other nine giants are vicious, bestial people-eaters. Not wanting to eat or steal from humans, the BFG subsists on eating "snozzcumbers", revolting vegetables resembling giant cucumbers, which are all that grows in Giant Country. He explains that he took her so she could not tell anyone that she had seen him and start a giant hunt. Sophie and the BFG quickly become friends, but Sophie is soon put in danger when a gruesome giant known as the Bloodbottler intrudes and unknowingly comes dangerously close to eating her. After the Bloodbottler leaves, the BFG makes her a new dress out of her blanket to replace her heavily soiled nightgown and treats her to a delicious and remarkable drink called "frobscottle".

The next morning, the BFG takes Sophie to Dream Country to catch more dreams. Though the BFG is nearly delayed by the Fleshlumpeater (the biggest, worst, and overall leader of the evil giants) where the BFG stating that he's out for a walk causes the Fleshlumpeater to let him go "this time". In Dream Country, the BFG demonstrates his dream-catching skills to Sophie and teaches her to fly; but the BFG mistakenly captures a "trogglehumper", the worst kind of nightmare. Upon arriving at his Dream Cave, the BFG shows Sophie all the dreams he has captured already and locks away the nightmare in his cavern of lava in a tiny chest, and takes Sophie to watch him on his dream-blowing duties; but this is cut short when they spot the Fleshlumpeater devouring a little boy whom the BFG had previously given a pleasant dream. The BFG flees with her to prevent her from being in danger again.

Afterwards, the grief-stricken Sophie convinces the BFG to stop the evil giants. They develop a plan to expose the evil giants to the Queen of England. Using dreams from his collection, the BFG creates a nightmare, blows it into the Queen's bedroom, leaves Sophie on the Queen's windowsill to confirm the dream and retreats into the palace gardens when Sophie calls him. Because the dream included foreknowledge of Sophie's presence, the Queen believes her story, and speaks with the BFG.

The British Army and Royal Air Force follow the BFG to Giant Country where the giants are tethered and taken prisoner. However, the Fleshlumpeater is the only one to evade capture. He furiously confronts and attacks the BFG for his betrayal and then goes after Sophie but, with the help of the terrible nightmare he caught earlier, the BFG is able to subdue the Fleshlumpeater with a nightmare about Jack leading him to be captured as well.

All nine of the evil giants are then all transported via helicopters to London where they are imprisoned in a deep metal pit. The orphanage is shut down where the BFG suggest that they make Mrs. Clonkers "feed the giants". As the Queen doesn't want to have anyone fed to the giants, the BFG suggests to the Queen that Mrs. Clonkers be made the giants' keeper and have them eat snozzcumbers for the rest of their lives. As for the girls from the orphanage, they will stay at Buckingham Palace for as long as they want. Contrary to the book's ending, the BFG stays in Giant Country instead of moving to England, and Sophie returns with him, becoming both his assistant at the distribution of dreams and his adoptive daughter.

== Voice cast ==
- David Jason as the BFG
- Amanda Root as Sophie
- Angela Thorne as The Queen
- Don Henderson as:
  - Bloodbottler
  - Fleshlumpeater
  - Sergeant
- Frank Thornton as Mr. Tibbs
- Mollie Sugden as Mary
- Michael Knowles as the Head of the Air Force
- Ballard Berkeley as the Head of the Army
- Myfanwy Talog as Mrs. Clonkers
- Jimmy Hibbert as Additional Voices

== Production ==
The BFG was one of Cosgrove Hall Films' only feature-length films, which was directed by Brian Cosgrove, along with The Wind in the Willows. Cosgrove also produced the film along with Mark Hall, while John Hambley, who also executive produced the film, scripted the film after Brian Trueman's initial draft was rejected.

Development of the film can be traced as far back as 1984, when only 5 people, including Cosgrove, were working on the film before being joined by other crew members.

According to Brian Cosgrove, the director and producer of the film, Roald Dahl was very supportive to the studio in production.

I painted a watercolour of how we saw him. I got a lovely note back from Dahl saying it was perfect, he was right behind it, and to just get on and do it. Sophie, the little girl who befriends the BFG, was easy. I had read that Dahl based her on his granddaughter, Sophie Dahl. At the time she wore John Lennon glasses, so we took it from there.

During production of the film, which took over 3 years, 750,000 cels were used against watercolour backgrounds designed by a team led by DC Thomson cartoonist John Geering.

The film also used the rotoscoping technique for some of the characters, particularly for Queen Elizabeth II and her servants. Initially, the technique was used while animating Sophie, but it was soon discovered that Jean Flynn and Meryl Edge could animate Sophie's movements without a reference.

== Reception ==
Writing in The Sunday Times before its broadcast, Patrick Stoddart called it a "delight", and wrote that it "puts its already celebrated British animators, Cosgrove Hall, into the Disney class". It has since gone on to be a cult classic.

In 2016, Louisa Mellor, of the Den of Geek website, warmly appraised the film in comparison to Steven Spielberg's then just-released adaptation, saying, "Cosgrove Hall's twenty-seven year old animated feature may be less of a technical feat than the latter and was certainly made for a fraction of the budget, but that doesn't make it any less a whoppsy-whiffling, razztwizzling tribute to a terrific story."

=== Roald Dahl's reaction ===
This film was the only adaptation of Dahl's works released during his lifetime to get praise from the author himself. Cosgrove said that after Dahl sat through a screening of the film, he stood up and applauded in delight.

When we finished, we ran a screening in Soho, and Dahl and his family came along. They were sitting at the back, and when the film finished they stood up and applauded. He could be quite vocal, Dahl, if he didn't like something. He didn't like Willy Wonka and the Chocolate Factory at all, the 1971 Gene Wilder one. So it was a real relief that he liked our film.

== Media releases ==
The film was first released on VHS by Video Collection International in the United Kingdom on 17 September 1990, in collaboration with Thorn EMI's Thames Video Collection. It was released again by the same company on 25 September 1995 and 13 October 1997.

Roadshow Home Video and ABC Video released the film on VHS in Australia on 12 February 1992, while its first video release in the United States was by Celebrity Home Entertainment on 2 April 1996.

Pearson Television International Ltd re-released the film on VHS on 2 July 2001, and on DVD for the first time on 8 April 2002. The DVD features 3 interactive games, an interview with Brian Cosgrove, a photo gallery and storyboards. Another release followed on 1 January 2008 by Pearson's successor, Fremantle Home Entertainment.

The film's first DVD release in the United States was distributed by Celebrity Home Entertainment on 28 September 1999. It was re-released by A&E Home Video on 27 June 2006.

On 10 September 2012, Fremantle Home Entertainment released a remastered version of the film on DVD and Blu-ray Disc.

On 11 July 2016, the film was re-released on DVD and Blu-ray Disc, but by Universal Pictures Home Entertainment in the United Kingdom.

== Soundtrack ==
The BFG – Original Soundtrack

Soundtrack album by Keith Hopwood and Malcolm Rowe
- Released: 11 July 2016
- Recorded: Pluto Studios; CTS Studios
- Genres: Electronic; Classical
- Length: 57:33
- Label: Pluto Music
- Producer: Keith Hopwood

Keith Hopwood's and Malcolm Rowe's original score to The BFG was released on 11 July 2016 by Pluto Music Limited and FremantleMedia.

Track listing

| No. | Title | Length |
|---|---|---|
| 1. | "The Vortex & Arrival" | 0:43 |
| 2. | "The Owl's Flight" | 1:34 |
| 3. | "Giant in the Street" | 1:49 |
| 4. | "The Getaway" | 1:29 |
| 5. | "Journey Through Giantland" | 1:41 |
| 6. | "You Snitched Me" | 1:41 |
| 7. | "Bloodbottler in the Cave" | 2:01 |
| 8. | "Sophie's Bath" | 1:35 |
| 9. | "Whizzpopping!" (performed by David Jason) | 2:40 |
| 10. | "Dusk to Dawn" | 0:51 |
| 11. | "Dream Country" | 3:29 |
| 12. | "Sometimes Secretly" (performed by Sharon Campbell) | 1:54 |
| 13. | "Insects! Part 1" | 0:43 |
| 14. | "Insects! Part 2" | 1:11 |
| 15. | "The Dream Cave" | 1:39 |
| 16. | "The Fishing Village" | 1:53 |
| 17. | "The Boy's Dream" | 1:12 |
| 18. | "Flight to Buckingham Palace" | 0:58 |
| 19. | "The Queen's Dream" | 1:13 |
| 20. | "This is The BFG" | 0:33 |
| 21. | "Helicopter Flight to Vortex" | 2:02 |
| 22. | "Vortex to Landing" | 1:00 |
| 23. | "Giant Round Up" | 1:40 |
| 24. | "Giant Awake" | 2:02 |
| 25. | "Still Loose" | 0:48 |
| 26. | "Fleshlumpeater 1" | 1:15 |
| 27. | "Fleshlumpeater 2" | 2:52 |
| 28. | "Choppers Return" | 1:52 |
| 29. | "The End" | 2:48 |
| 30. | "Two Worlds" (performed by Paul Young and Sharon Campbell) | 3:38 |
| 31. | "Mirror Mirror (Sophie’s Theme)" (performed by Sharon Campbell) | 3:47 |
| 32. | "Sometimes Secretly (Full Length Version)" (performed by Sharon Campbell) | 3:03 |
| Total length: | | 57:33 |

== Accolades ==
| Year | Award | Category | Nominee | Result |
|---|---|---|---|---|
| 1990 | BAFTA Awards | Best Children's Programme (Entertainment/Drama) | Brian Cosgrove & Mark Hall | Nominated |
| 1989 | New York Festival | Best Score and Songs | Keith Hopwood | Won |

== See also ==
- The BFG (2016), the Disney live-action feature.
