= Oakie Doke =

British children's television programme

- Genre: Children's
- Created by: Bridget Appleby
- Written by: Jimmy Hibbert
- Directed by: Series 1: Brian Little; Series 2: Ellen Meske
- Voices of: David Holt; Kate Harbour
- Opening theme: "Oakie Doke" by Ernie Wood
- Ending theme: "Oakie Doke" by Ernie Wood (Extended)
- Composer: Ernie Wood
- Country of origin: United Kingdom
- Original language: English
- No. of seasons: 2
- No. of episodes: 26

Production
- Executive producers: Brian Cosgrove; Mark Hall; Theresa Plummer-Andrews
- Producers: Jackie Cockle; Chris Bowden
- Running time: 10 minutes
- Production company: Cosgrove Hall Films

Original release
- Network: BBC1 and BBC2 (Children's BBC)
- Release: 11 September 1995 – 13 September 1997

Oakie Doke is a British children's television programme that was broadcast from 1995 to 1997 on the Children's BBC block of the BBC. It was produced by Cosgrove Hall Films and was animated with stop-motion animation. The show ran for two series, each containing 13 episodes.

It also aired on ABC in Australia, TVNZ 2 in New Zealand, RTÉ Two in Ireland as part of their children's block The Den, Dubai 33 in the United Arab Emirates, Net 25 in the Philippines, SABC2 in South Africa, Prime 12 and Premiere 12 in Singapore, TVP1 in Poland, ITV in Thailand, Arutz HaYeladim in Israel, ATV in Hong Kong as part of their children's block Tube Time, BFBS and SSVC Television as part of their children's block Children's SSVC in Germany, Yle TV1 in Finland and PBS in the U.S. as part of a programming block for children called Someday School.

The theme song was composed and sung by Ernie Wood who also composed the incidental music for the series.

== Characters ==
- Oakie Doke – the show's titular main character. A man who is made of acorns, twigs and leaves, and is friendly and eager to please.
- The Mole family – Mr Manny, Mrs Milly, Marcia and Marcus
- The Mouse family (the Corncrackers) – Albert, Rose, Root, Snoot and Hickory (the latter of whom is the family's adoptive son, as he is a dormouse, in contrast to the rest of the family, who are field mice).
- The Frog family - Moses, Neptune, Abel and Granny Annie who pushes around a bowl containing three tadpoles, on a pram.
- The Hedgehog family (the Tickles) - Mrs Tickle, Lizzie, Libby and Shrimp
- The Squirrel family - Rufus, Rain and Hazel
- Dave and Denzil – two mischievous grey squirrels who communicate frequently with a cups and string phone.

== Plot synopsis ==
Oakie Doke is a character who lives in an oak tree. His head is an acorn and he wears an oak leaf on his upper body. His skin is light green and he has distinctive rosy cheeks. He is very friendly and a well-respected member of the forest. He slides down the slide around his treehouse every morning and his friends include squirrels, mice, frogs, hedgehogs and moles.

In the show's opening titles, one of Oakie's friends would ring a bell at the bottom of his tree, which would wake him up. He would then ride a slide that wound round the trunk of the tree to the bottom. The episode then began. In a typical episode, there is a friend who has an everyday problem in the woods, to which Oakie immediately comes to their aid. There is usually a dilemma, but he helps the friend in need and is often assisted by his other friends from the forest. Many of the problems that arise are a result of the actions of Dave and Denzil, who are known to carry actions out without considering the consequences. However, they usually show some remorse when Oakie later confronts the pair about their behaviour.

Towards the end of each episode, after Oakie helps solve the problem, he states: "Well, it's just like I always say...", followed by a rhyming phrase. This phrase would be in relation to the solution of the problem. This is then greeted with approving laughter and applause from whoever is present at the time.

== Episodes ==
=== Series overview ===
Series	Episodes	Originally released	
Series	Episodes	First released	Last released
1	13	11 September 1995	4 December 1995
2	13	7 April 1997	13 September 1997

=== Series 1 (1995) ===
No. overall	No. in series	Title	Original release date
1	1	"Oakie Doke and the Lonely Mouse"	11 September 1995
A tailless mouse named Hickory is looking for a home. After rescuing Snoot's tail from a tree root, Hickory is adopted by the Corncracker Family.
2	2	"Oakie Doke and the Nut Mystery"	18 September 1995
Doke helps Rufus to find his missing nut stash and Rose to find Root using Manny's water detector. They find Root fast asleep in a hollow tree along with the nut stash Dave and Denzil stole.
3	3	"Oakie Doke and the Party"	25 September 1995
Rose is not able to cook pizzas for the Oakie Hollows Hoedown due to her broken oven. Manny finds out that Snoot stuffed Grannie Annie's hat down the pipe. After Marcus, Root and Oakie have fixed the oven, Oakie and all the family come to the Oakie Hollows Hoedown with the pizzas.
4	4	"Oakie Doke and the Birthday Cake"	2 October 1995
Mrs Tickle has a cold this morning, which Lizzie is not pleased about, as it's her birthday today. To cheer up, Doke gets some help to make a cake for Lizzie's Birthday Party, but Mrs Tickle already has a surprise for Lizzie.
5	5	"Oakie Doke and the Hiccups"	9 October 1995
Moses gets the hiccups after drinking Granny Annie's unready lemonade. Doke's methods to cure it don't work, but the sight of Lizzie's statue of Doke does.
6	6	"Oakie Doke and the Hat Hunt"	16 October 1995
Granny Annie accidentally loses her hat at the bottom of the pond, so everyone participates in a competition to fish the hat out for a grand prize.
7	7	"Oakie Doke and the Scooter"	23 October 1995
Inspired by the story of Spotty Scunthorpe's Scooter, Doke builds a scooter to help with deliveries. When Dave and Denzil try it, they end up crashing it in the pond, but they get it back and clean it up.
8	8	"Oakie Doke and the Cheeky Breeze"	30 October 1995
On a very windy day, Doke and Marcia go on a trip to retrieve all of Milly's blown away washing, while Root mistakes the moaning of the wind for a ghost.
9	9	"Oakie Doke and the Orchestra"	6 November 1995
Doke delivers some bottles to Granny Annie's house for her lemonade, which accidentally gets ruined by Neptune, who puts baking powder in the lemonade instead of sugar. While Granny Annie cleans up, Oakie stops by the Corncrackers' house to teach the animals to make music and they all form an orchestra.
10	10	"Oakie Doke and the Treasure Hunt"	13 November 1995
Doke starts up treasure hunt for the animal children, while he does some chores for their parents. Root throws a conker, one of the items on the hunt, down a manhole and while trying to retrieve it, he gets a bit lost, but luckily, Manny helps him out.
11	11	"Oakie Doke and the Monster"	20 November 1995
Doke babysits the tadpoles for Grannie Annie and Shrimp for Mrs. Tickle. Meanwhile Snoot spots what she thinks is a monster, but it is actually Lizzie's papier-mâché mask.
12	12	"Oakie Doke and the Jam Puddle"	27 November 1995
Doke runs Mrs. Tickle's shop while looking after Shrimp and Root. Later, Shrimp wanders off and Marcia finds a puddle of jam.
13	13	"Oakie Doke and the Wishing Well"	4 December 1995
Dave and Denzil establish a wishing well to collect nuts from wish makers. Doke finds out about this and tricks Dave and Denzil into thinking those wishes do come true.

=== Series 2 (1997) ===
No. overall	No. in series	Title	Original release date
14	1	"Oakie Doke and the Wheelbarrow Nut"	7 April 1997
Oakie helps Root plant a nut at the allotment, but Dave and Denzil take the opportunity to trick Root into thinking a wheelbarrow has grown from the nut. Doke finds out about this and decides, with the help of Root, to catch the two of them.
15	2	"Oakie Doke and the Missing Mouse"	22 July 1997
Root has lost his cuddly toy mouse with the bell on, so he and Doke become detectives for the day in order to search for it.
16	3	"Oakie Doke and the Little Helpers"	24 July 1997
Doke is tired today and falls asleep, missing his chores. The village children attempt to do the chores themselves instead.
17	4	"Oakie Doke and the Burnt Pizzas"	31 July 1997
When the village children play a game in Oakie's house, Root ends up stuck at the top and can't go down Oakie's slide, as Oakie told him not to. Meanwhile, Granddad Albert and Oakie Doke try to figure out what to do with Rose's burnt pizzas. Granny Annie's pram's wheels have fallen off, which gives Oakie an idea – he can use the burnt pizzas as substitute wheels.
18	5	"Oakie Doke and the Talking Stone"	5 August 1997
In the middle of the Oakie Hollows Painting Contest, Dave and Denzil, the judges, give a painted stone a monstrous expression, scaring the village children. Doke finds out about this and gives Dave and Denzil such a fright that they won't want to do it again.
19	6	"Oakie Doke and the New Pet"	7 August 1997
Root wants a new pet, while Doke can't get his breakfast as he has a lot of jobs to do. After much searching for the both of them, Root gets a pet rock whilst Doke gets his breakfast at the Moles' place.
20	7	"Oakie Doke and the Birthday Surprise"	14 August 1997
It's Granny Annie's birthday, and whilst the rest of the Toad family try to keep it a secret, Oakie proposes that the Oakie Hollows Orchestra reunite to perform a special birthday song for her.
21	8	"Oakie Doke and the Runaway Bowls"	19 August 1997
The day after a thunderstorm, Doke helps Rufus and Rain repair their chimney. Meanwhile, Root thinks he can hear giants, and thanks to Hickory and Snoot, there are now several bowls rolling around the woods, causing chaos wherever they go.
22	9	"Oakie Doke and the Oakie Hollows Fete"	21 August 1997
Everyone in Oakie Hollows is having an Oakie Hollows Fete, with Granny Annie in charge of fortune telling, Root trying his hand at the ring toss, Rufus in charge of the Acorn Alley game and Dave and Denzil in charge of security.
23	10	"Oakie Doke and the Helpful Mouse"	26 August 1997
The Corncrackers are helping get a surprise party ready for Rose. Root doesn't turn out to be very useful - until Oakie Doke shows up. Together, they gather flowers, groundling berries and jam tarts (with the help of Root's tail).
24	11	"Oakie Doke and the Go Cart Race"	28 August 1997
When Oakie sees Moses and Neptune's go carts, he decides to hold a go cart race. The prize is a big cake, which Dave and Denzil are determined to have for themselves.
25	12	"Oakie Doke and the Messy Day"	6 September 1997
Oakie Doke babysits Moses and Neptune while Granny Annie is out, but Moses and Neptune turn out to be very messy.
26	13	"Oakie Doke and the Shooting Star"	13 September 1997
The Corncrackers spot a shooting star in the night sky. Scoot and Hickory trick Root with a pretend flying saucer, so Root tricks them with a spaceman costume.

== Home releases ==
In 1996, BBC Video released five episodes from the first series on VHS.

VHS title	Release date	Episodes
Oakie Doke (BBCV 5875)	5 August 1996	"Oakie Doke and the Lonely Mouse"; "Oakie Doke and the Nut Mystery"; "Oakie Doke and the Party"; "Oakie Doke and the Scooter"; "Oakie Doke and the Treasure Hunt"
