= Pip Ahoy! =

- Genre: Children's; Animated
- Created by: Charles Ward; Brian Cosgrove; Mark Hall
- Voices of: David Jason; Teresa Gallagher; Jimmy Hibbert; Emma Tate; Stacey Solomon
- Composer: Keith Hopwood
- Country of origin: United Kingdom
- Original language: English
- No. of seasons: 3
- No. of episodes: 79

Production
- Producers: Brian Cosgrove; Simon Hall; Francis Fitzpatrick
- Production company: CHF Entertainment

Original release
- Network: Channel 5 (series 1–2); Cartoonito (series 2–3); ITVBe (series 3)
- Release: 1 July 2014 – 21 November 2018

Pip Ahoy! is a British children's animated television series aimed at preschoolers following the adventures of a puppy named Pip and his best friend, a kitten named Alba, who live in Salty Cove. The series originally aired on Milkshake! on 1 July 2014. Cartoon Network UK's sister pre-school channel Cartoonito premiered Pip Ahoy! on 2 March 2015. The first two series were originally shown on Channel 5's Milkshake!. A third series began airing on ITVBe's pre-school block LittleBe on 3 September 2018. Animation created by Charles Ward.

== Characters ==
- Pip (voiced by Teresa Gallagher) – A lovable 7-year-old sea puppy.
- Alba (voiced by Emma Tate) – Pip's best friend. She is a 7-year-old kitten.
- Skipper (voiced by David Jason) – An old sea dog who is a lighthouse keeper. He is Pip's uncle.
- Hopper (voiced by Jimmy Hibbert) – A one-legged 8-year-old seagull.
- Pasty (voiced by David Jason) – A 7½-year-old crab that takes the appearance of the type of pie that bears his name.
- Shelvis (voiced by Jimmy Hibbert) – A busy hermit crab.
- Billy (voiced by Emma Tate) - A 6¾-year-old badger who is younger than Pip and Alba.
- Aisha and Amir (voiced by Teresa Gallagher and Emma Tate respectively) - Two fox twins who like to cause mischief.
- The Squiblets – A cluster of little shells who love to sing about the day's event.
- Mr. Morris Maurice (voiced by David Jason) – A green parrot with a Welsh accent who is the driver of the Bubble Train.
- Mrs. Marjorie Twitcher (voiced by Emma Tate) – A cat who drives a taxi. She is Alba's auntie.
- Madame Francois Eclair (voiced by Emma Tate) – A female poodle with a French accent who runs the Cake Shop.
- Mrs. Alice Finn (voiced by Emma Tate) - A female polar bear with an Irish accent who runs both the Seaside Shop and a juice stall.
- Etienne (voiced by Teresa Gallagher) - Madame Eclair's nephew, who is often found in his buggy either sleeping or crying.
- Captain Bilge, Trelawney and Number 3, the Mice Pirates (voiced by Jimmy Hibbert, Emma Tate and David Jason respectively) – Three pirates who like hunting for treasure. They let Pip join their crew once, and still occasionally visit Salty Cove.
- Alan (voiced by Jimmy Hibbert) – A little penguin who likes bouncing.
- Professor Evie (voiced by Emma Tate) – A female meerkat with a Scottish accent who is a scientist, and has a submarine.
- Mr. and Mrs Snail (voiced by Jimmy Hibbert and Teresa Gallagher) – Two semi-unfriendly snails. Mr. Snail wears a smart suit, has a brown moustache and speaks in a Manchester accent. Mrs Snail wears a smart woman's dress, has lipstick and speaks in a Manchester accent.
- Aubrey Snail (voiced by Teresa Gallagher) – Norman's son.
- Fuchsia (voiced by Stacey Solomon) – A pink flamingo who is part of a pop group known as The Flaming Pinks.
- Kevin, Cyril and Percy (voiced by Jimmy Hibbert, David Jason and Teresa Gallagher) – Three naughty gulls.
- Meryl (voiced by Teresa Gallagher) - A mermaid who is rather fussy.
- Jonesy (voiced by Jimmy Hibbert) - A Welsh seal who is Meryl's friend.
- Esme (voiced by Teresa Gallagher) - An American whale who occasionally visits Salty Cove.
- The Rocktopus (voiced by David Jason) – A purple octopus who lives under the sea, and likes drumming.

== Production ==
=== Development ===
Pip Ahoy originated as The Salties around 1995, while the creator was reading bedtime stories to his boys James and Freddie, during his annual holiday to Salcombe. Assisted by his wife Katie, he recorded the stories in a small red book, in the hope that they would be published one day. The red book lay in a drawer for 10 years until 2005, when Katie and Ward decided that The Salties should become reality. In 2007, Charles meet Francis Fitzpatrick and formed a partnership to promote The Salties around the world. Ward and Francis pitched The Salties to many Animation Studios such as HiT Entertainment only to see rejection, but sometime in 2011 Ward received a call from Francis to say that he'd just had met someone while attending Kidscreen in New York who thought Cosgrove Hall might be interested and in around February 2011, France and Charles meet the Cosgrove team at the premises of 422 TV in Manchester.

A few weeks later, France and Charles meet some of Cosgrove Hall's ex-employees, who had been asked to come up with some new ideas. Mark Hall explained that he felt we should keep “Captain’ (now called ‘Skipper’) was a grandfather type character and would become the narrator of the stories. Cosgrove Hall had a fine reputation for storytelling and it seemed they would call upon the best for The Salties. Mark and Brian had also introduced a brand new character, called Pip and he was told that pre-school children needed to see a character of approximately their own age, so Pip was born.

Eventually, CHF Entertainment was formed and Pip Ahoy! went into production in November 2011.

== Episodes ==
=== Series 1 (2014) ===
No. overall	No. in series	Title	Written by	Original release date
1	1	"The Mice Pirates"	Corrinne Averiss	1 July 2014
The Mice Pirates land in Salty Cove with a treasure map. Pip is enlisted to help them find the precious cargo - which turns out to be Captain Skipper's cheesecake.
2	2	"Fancy That!"	Jimmy Hibbert	2 July 2014
When Pip and Alba enter a fancy dress gala, Pip misplaces his Scopey Eye in the search for a costume.
3	3	"Snooze Cruise"	Corrinne Averiss	3 July 2014
Pip and Skipper lead a dramatic rescue mission after Alan falls asleep on a bouncy castle which gets blown out to sea. Can they bring him back safely to dry land?
4	4	"The Mermaid"	Corrinne Averiss	4 July 2014
After Pip and Alba find a mermaid named Meryl, perched on a rock near Salty Point and crying her eyes out, Skipper leads a mission to make the mermaid smile. It turns out she has lost the Song Shell, the shell that enables all mermaids to sing.
5	5	"Pizza Pirates"	Nick Wilson	7 July 2014
Pip and Alba meet the mice pirates outside Madame Eclair's shop, where they are trying to buy ingredients for a mysterious culinary dish. With Pip's help they get what they want, then retreat to their ship for a spot of pirate cooking. What could they be making?
6	6	"Pasty Flies a Kite"	Arabella Warner	8 July 2014
Pip, Alba and Hopper leave their high-flying kite in the claws of inquisitive crab Pasty, but he is too small to hold the kite down and it lifts him up and carries him out to sea.
7	7	"Stunt Gull Hopper"	Corrinne Averiss	9 July 2014
The Stunt Gull display team are due to perform in Salty Cove when disaster strikes - Cyril is injured in training and without him or a replacement, the show cannot go on. Luckily, Pip and Alba have an idea which involves Hopper.
8	8	"Auntie Twitcher's Bird Watch"	Nick Wilson	10 July 2014
Mrs Twitcher has always wanted to see an albatross, so she takes Pip and Alba out to sea on a bird-watching expedition. Back in Salty Cove, a peculiar holidaymaker called Alby Tross arrives and spends the day sunbathing on the beach.
9	9	"The Rocktopus"	Corrinne Averiss	11 July 2014
After Pip and Alba borrow Skipper's pans and wooden spoons and pretend to be drummers, they discover a distraught octopus in the rock pool who has lost his drumsticks. So, Pip and Alba decide to lend him Skipper's wooden spoons.
10	10	"My Turn"	Nick Wilson	14 July 2014
The puffins are very agitated because a flock of terns have taken over their rock. So, Skipper takes Pip, Alba, Hopper and Pasty out to Puffin Rock to find a solution. They eventually come up with an idea, which is to take turns on sharing the rock. But the terns don't seem to have got the grasp of the whole idea...
11	11	"Anybody Seen Alan?"	Gillian Corderoy	15 July 2014
Pip and friends are playing in the playground with young Alan enjoying the seesaw so much he will not go on anything else. But when the gulls drop Madame Eclair's cake on the opposite end of the seesaw, Alan is catapulted out of the playground and across Salty Cove.
12	12	"The Wrong Way Train"	Nick Wilson	16 July 2014
Looking out from the lighthouse, Pip and Skipper are alarmed to see Morris Maurice is having difficulty with his Bubble Train - he cannot steer it properly and it ends up in the sea. How can they get Morris back on track?
13	13	"Shelvis' New Home"	Jimmy Hibbert	17 July 2014
When Shelvis' many possessions become too much for his shell home, Pip and Alba try to find him a new one. But all of the big shells seem to be occupied, so Pip and Alba build him a sand castle.
14	14	"Balloonatics"	Nick Wilson	28 July 2014
Pip is eager to take a closer look at Mr Morris's hot air balloon, which he has left secured on the beach. But when Mrs Twitcher tumbles into the basket and Hopper loosens the anchor ropes, Pip ends up flying over Salty Cove.
15	15	"Hats Off for Skipper"	Helena Smee	29 July 2014
When the gulls make off with Skipper's favourite hat, it takes all of Pip and Alba's efforts to recover it. The pursuit takes them all round Salty Cove and finally out to sea and Puffin Island.
16	16	"On the Beach"	Nick Wilson	30 July 2014
Pip and Alba go beachcombing, where they come across Meryl the Mermaid stranded on the shore - the storm from last night has washed her high up on the sand. Luckily, Pip has a plan involving the flotsam and jetsam lying on the beach.
17	17	"Pip's Picnic"	Jimmy Hibbert	31 July 2014
Rain stops play when Pip wants to have a picnic with his friends out at sea. Skipper's quick thinking saves the day, however, and he steers them safely into harbour. They then meet Professor Evie in her observatory, who offers to take them for an underwater picnic.
18	18	"Got to Dance"	Jimmy Hibbert	1 August 2014
Aubrey the snail is upset because his dad wants him to become a footballer. But Aubrey just wants to dance. Pip and Alba cleverly arrange for Aubrey to show his dad his dancing skills during a football match.
19	19	"Roll With It"	Adam Peters	15 September 2014
Mrs Twitcher teaches Pip and his friends to roller skate. Captain Skipper is very fast but has not yet learnt how to stop and his skates take him all over the town before Pip and Alba manage to bring him to a standstill.
20	20	"Pasty's Got Talent"	Gillian Corderoy	16 September 2014
Pasty's Spanish cousin Gonzalez comes to visit and Pasty begins to feel inferior next to the talented crab. Pip convinces him that he is just as talented and special as Gonzalez, with a dance he's devised called the Pastycake.
21	21	"All in a Fog"	Arabella Warner	17 September 2014
Pip and Alba recruit the Squiblets to help Captain Skipper and Mr. Maurice out after the lighthouse foghorn breaks, leaving them with no sound to guide them home.
22	22	"Beside the Sneeze-side"	Jimmy Hibbert	18 September 2014
On a day trip, Pip, Alba, Skipper and friends try to work out what is causing Mr Morris to sneeze so much. They come to the conclusion that his scarf must be tickling his nose.
23	23	"Alba's Big Find"	Gillian Corderoy	19 September 2014
Alba is disappointed to find only a very small snail while out looking for new scientific discoveries. Professor Evie, however, is very excited - the snail is extremely rare.
24	24	"I Remember"	Nick Wilson	22 September 2014
After seeing a picture of Skipper on a camping trip, Pip and Alba convince him to dig out his tent and take them over to River Island. Unfortunately when they get there they discover that the old tent is full of holes.
25	25	"Walkie Talkie"	Helena Smee	23 September 2014
When Skipper twists his ankle, Pip and Alba offer to do his chores for him. To make sure they're getting everything right, Skipper keeps an eye on them through his binoculars and tells them what to do through a walkie talkie.
26	26	"Pip's Birthday Present"	Helen Brown	24 September 2014
Pip has a birthday picnic on the grass outside the lighthouse with his friends. Alba gives Pip a wonderful present - an adventure scrapbook detailing all of the escapades they have got up to together.

=== Series 2 (2015) ===
No. overall	No. in series	Title	Written by	Original release date
27	1	"Pirate Hunt"	Adam Peters	23 January 2015
Pip and Alba have to find Captain Bilge before the tide turns and the Mice Pirates are stranded in Salty Cove. Luckily, what appears at first to be a stern task turns out to be a piece of cake.
28	2	"The Queen's Visit"	Corrinne Averiss	26 January 2015
When the Queen visits Salty Cove, there is great confusion. Alba wants to paint her portrait, but it turns out that the Queen is an ocean liner, and not a regal lady at all. With some quick thinking by Pip, Alba completes the portrait.
29	3	"Old Pincher"	Arabella Warner	27 January 2015
Pip and Alba set about tracking down a distinguished old crab named Old Pincher when they spot his photo in an old album of Captain Skipper's.
30	4	"Pasty's Backpack"	Jimmy Hibbert	28 January 2015
When a storm spreads Pasty's collection of things all over the beach, Pip and Alba decide to make him a backpack in which to gather and keep them.
31	5	"Pip and Alba's Big Day Out"	Nick Wilson	29 January 2015
The friends arrange an expedition to go in search of an unusual striped butterfly. They find it high up in a tree and Mrs Twitcher proves to be a great climber.
32	6	"Go, Stop! Go, Stop!"	Corrinne Averiss	30 January 2015
Pip and Alba enter a competition for young film-makers and set about capturing on film all the things that are on the move in the town, from boats to trains to taxis.
33	7	"Sea Sprite Explorer"	Helena Smee	2 February 2015
When Alba goes exploring on an island in order to earn her sea sprite badge, Hopper hears strange noises and starts to believe that there is a monster in their midst.
34	8	"The New Harbour Pilot"	Helena Smee	3 February 2015
When the town needs a new harbour pilot, Mr Morris wants to apply but fears that he may not be fit enough. Pip, Alba and their friends devise a novel fitness programme to help him out.
35	9	"Bubble Trouble"	Adam Peters	7 May 2015
Pip and Alba volunteer to help Skipper wash up. When they run out of washing up liquid, Hopper is dispatched to get a new bottle, but on his return journey he drops it into the Bubble Train, causing a mass of bubbles all over Salty Cove.
36	10	"The Alan Comet"	Gillian Corderoy	8 May 2015
A comet is due to fly over Salty Cove and everyone wants to stay awake to see it. Professor Evie invites Pip and Alba to the Observatory to watch. Meanwhile, Hopper tries to take a nap during the day so that he stays awake at night, and is trying to get Alan to do the same.
37	11	"Flags to Fishes"	Corrinne Averiss	11 May 2015
Pip and Alba want to make Skipper a new flag for one of his boats, and Skipper has just the thing to make it from. Meanwhile, Professor Evie and Mrs Twitcher are out to sea in a sailing yacht when a school of flying rainbow fish scoot over their boat and tear a hole in the sail.
38	12	"Treasure Island"	Jimmy Hibbert	12 May 2015
Pip is looking in Skipper's sea chest and discovers an old treasure map of one of the islands on the river, so Skipper takes Pip, Alba and their friends in the Bucket so they can search the island for treasure.
39	13	"Look What the Wind Blew In"	Arabella Warner	13 May 2015
It's the morning after a big storm and the beach is littered with flotsam and jetsam. Meanwhile, Skipper needs to go to sea to investigate some boxes that have been blown off a cargo ship, but his trip is stopped short as there is no wheel on the Rubber Duck.
40	14	"Pip's Plane"	Nick Wilson	14 May 2015
A new radio controlled plane arrives for Pip, so Skipper helps him put it together and take it for a test flight on the beach, but Shelvis mistakes it for a resting place and settles himself in the pilot seat. When the plane takes off with a new test pilot, Hopper breaks the controls and Alba has to come to the rescue of both the plane and Shelvis.
41	15	"Lift Off"	Arabella Warner	15 May 2015
Skipper and Mrs Twitcher agree to be the crew for Professor Evie and Mr Morris when they challenge each other to a yacht vs train race around the Harbour, but on their way out of the Lighthouse the pair get stuck in the lift. While Pasty tries to get them out, Pip and Alba take their place on Professor Evie's yacht and Mr Morris's Bubble Train respectively.
42	16	"The Boat That Bounced"	Jimmy Hibbert	18 May 2015
The Mice Pirates arrive in Salty Cove in search of cheesecake treasure, but none of the crew want to stay behind to look after the ship so it is left in Hopper's care. But when Alan bounces on board to play and inadvertently bounces the ship out to sea, the Mice Pirates are distraught, so Pip, Alba and Skipper set out on a rescue mission.
43	17	"Lucky Compass"	Gillian Corderoy	19 May 2015
Pip and Alba are left to sort through a pile of stuff for Skipper but there is a mix up between the `to be kept' pile and the `recycle' pile and a precious old compass is inadvertently sent to be recycled. When Alan spies the compass and keeps it for himself, Pip negotiates an exchange to get it back.
44	18	"Runs in the Family"	Helena Smee	20 May 2015
Pip discovers he is from a family with a long line of ship builders and sets out to show that he has the skill too. With Alba's help, Pip builds a sailing yacht with a difference - a sandyacht with wheels instead of a rudder, and Pip and friends have loads of fun racing it across the beach.
45	19	"Ship in a Bottle"	Arabella Warner	21 May 2015
Skipper is preparing to exhibit his collection of model boats but when he leaves Pip and Alba admiring his favourite model, Hopper drops in and smashes it. Pip and Alba set about making a replacement whilst Hopper and Pasty try to mend the wreck.
46	20	"Flamingos a Go-Go"	Jimmy Hibbert	22 May 2015
A mysterious feather sets Pip and Alba off in search of the owner. They find a singing flamingo who has been blown off course en route to her concert venue. She has also been separated from the other members of her trio. Whilst Hopper cements a new and unlikely friendship, Pip and Alba, with Skipper's help, set about reuniting the trio so that Salty Cove can enjoy a fabulous concert.
47	21	"Shipshaped Cupcakes"	Corrinne Averiss	25 May 2015
Pip, Alba and Skipper enter the Salty Cove Cake Off. Skipper makes his famous cheesecake, Alba makes a cake with a smile on it, and Pip makes shipshaped cupcakes. Meanwhile, Madame Éclair makes Hopper's day when she allows him to help judge the competition.
48	22	"Count Me In"	Nick Wilson	10 November 2015
Mrs Twitcher is organizing the annual Salty Cove Bird Count. She and Pasty set up a counting desk by the harbour and Skipper takes Pip and Alba out to sea to count all of the different birds, but it proves to be tricky.
49	23	"Treasure Hunt Alan"	Gillian Corderoy	11 November 2015
It is the annual treasure hunt and Pip and Alba have a cunning plan. Alan has never won the hunt and so this year Pip and Alba want to make sure that he comes out on top.
50	24	"The Wrong Rucksack"	Helena Smee	12 November 2015
Skipper asks Pip and Alba to deliver a parcel for him to Professor Evie, before teatime. The friends set off with the parcel in Alba's rucksack, but the rucksack gets mixed up with Alan's when they pause to chat to him and Hopper.
51	25	"Alan Loses His Bounce"	Jimmy Hibbert	13 November 2015
Alan starts the day so full of music and bounce that his enthusiasm is catching. Soon everyone is singing, but Alan stops when Norman the snail tells him that bouncing is silly. It's now up to Pip and friends to get him bouncing again.
52	26	"Let's Put On a Play"	Arabella Warner	14 November 2015
Rehearsals for Pip and Alba's new play about pirates are in full swing when the Mice Pirates sail into harbour and invade the stage.

=== Christmas Special (2015) ===
No. overall	Title	Written by	Original release date
53	"Christmas Ahoy!"	Jimmy Hibbert	25 December 2015
When Pip and Alba learn that Alan won't be seeing his Uncle Ferris or his cousins this Christmas, they enlist the help of a friendly whale to bring them to Salty Cove for a wonderful party inside an iceberg.

=== Series 3 (2018) ===
No. overall	No. in series	Title	Written by	Original release date
54	1	"The Sprout Surprise"	Helena Smee	3 September 2018
Skipper and Mrs Twitcher organise a trail in the forest for the Sprouts to follow, with a secret destination at the end. But a mix-up with a key and a sleepy Mr. Morris means the Sprouts have to solve a tricky problem before they can rest.
55	2	"Stuck in the Mud"	Nick Wilson	3 September 2018
Mrs Twitcher is on the trail of the rare blue warbler with Pip, Alba, Billy and Alan, when their taxi gets stuck in the mud and nothing will get it out. Captain Skipper, who just so happens to be the new Rescue Ranger, and his gadget-filled Cove Rover must now try to arrive in time to save the day.
56	3	"Cheesecake Island"	Arabella Warner	4 September 2018
The Mice Pirates return to Salty Cove searching for a new place to hide their treasure, and Pip wants to be part of the crew again. Following Alba's treasure map, they discover a new island and another pirate ship, with a mysterious crew.
57	4	"Come Home Pasty"	Gillian Corderoy	4 September 2018
After a huge storm sweeps Pasty's home out to sea, Skipper lets him stay in the lighthouse while they rescue his home from the bay. But when Pasty makes himself too comfortable, Skipper, Pip and Alba need to get him back in his own home.
58	5	"Shelling Out"	Jimmy Hibbert	5 September 2018
Alan demolishes the Snail family's holiday home by bouncing and Skipper keeps the family distracted with a trip in the Rubber Duck while Pip and Alba build them a new home. Alan's attempt at a finishing touch, however, makes Shelvis homeless as well.
59	6	"I've Lost Grandpa"	Helena Smee	5 September 2018
The Badger family are moving house with Skipper's help, and Billy has to look after his Grandpa for the day. But Grandpa Badger wants to have an adventure on his mobility scooter, and challenges Mr Morris to a race while Billy is playing with Pip and Alba.
60	7	"Mr. Otley"	Jimmy Hibbert	6 September 2018
Pasty finds Mr. Otley the cuddly toy rabbit and makes him his new best friend, before Mr Otley accidentally flies away on a balloon. On the way to collect a cake for Skipper, Pip and Alba help to search for him but his true owner, Madame Eclair's nephew Etienne, might want him back.
61	8	"Sock Thief"	Helena Smee	6 September 2018
It is a great day for hanging out the washing, but everyone is noticing socks going missing from their washing lines. With the Sprouts' variety show at the Village Hall fast approaching, Pip and Alba must try to discover the identity of the sock thief.
62	9	"Puffin Rescue"	Helena Smee	7 September 2018
A terrible smell has invaded Salty Cove, and it isn't Hopper, or Skipper's roses. It turns out to be stinky seaweed on Puffin Island, so Professor Evie clears it while Pip and Alba organise bath-time for smelly puffins. But they all fly away before they can be taken home.
63	10	"The Sea Serpent"	Corrinne Averiss	7 September 2018
Inspired by a picture book, Pip and his friends build something to cheer up Mrs Finn, and earn their `Make and Do' Sprout badges. However, Pasty and Hopper are convinced that what they've seen marching around town is real, and out to get them.
64	11	"Another Fine Mess"	Jimmy Hibbert	10 September 2018
When Skipper, Pip and Alba are called away to clear some litter blowing around on the beach, Pasty and Hopper decide to help bake the cake they were making. But when neither of them know the recipe, they start to improvise.
65	12	"Tree Trouble"	Nick Wilson	10 September 2018
Mr Morris is building a treehouse for the Sprouts, but when Alan gets himself stuck Mrs Twitcher has to call the Rescue Ranger. Alan might have to wait until he is thinner to get out, and the cakes might not be safe with Assistant Ranger Hopper around.
66	13	"Skipper's Surprise"	Arabella Warner	11 September 2018
Part of Salty Cove's nautical history is destined for scrap, but Alba has an idea. The sight of a mysterious creature walking through the town scares some of the locals, but when they see the end result, even Skipper is surprised.
67	14	"Marvellous Machines"	Adam Peters	5 November 2018
It is Marvellous Machines Day, when home-made flying machines race across the sky in Salty Cove. Mr Morris, Mrs Twitcher, and Skipper attempt to make it to the finish line, while Pasty and the gulls try to take victory with a more basic plan.
68	15	"Mice Pirate Radio"	Adam Peters	6 November 2018
The most popular radio show in Salty Cove takes over the airwaves until a sudden silence causes concern. Skipper and his crew search the ocean, meeting many talents along the way, until they reach the Mice Pirates, and the race is on to save the show.
69	16	"Gold Rush"	Jimmy Hibbert	7 November 2018
The Sprouts are off for a hike, and Pasty must guard the lighthouse and some chocolates for Skipper. Hopper's trickery secures the chocolates for himself but takes things a little too far. There is also some mysterious treasure on the beach.
70	17	"Who's Afraid of the Big Bad Penguin?"	Jimmy Hibbert	8 November 2018
When a huge iceberg approaches Salty Cove, Alan guesses that his family have come for a visit. But when one of his mischievous cousins disappears, Pip and Alba have to search for her at the town's new attraction, and Hopper gets a fright on the way.
71	18	"Obstacle Alan"	Gillian Corderoy	9 November 2018
Mrs Twitcher has set up an obstacle course for the Sprouts, but Alan needs help from his friends, and wanders off feeling disheartened and useless. However, when Pip's Scopey Eye goes missing, Pip realises that there is only one person who can help.
72	19	"Fit as a Skipper"	Jimmy Hibbert	12 November 2018
A jog to the quayside shows Alba just how unfit Skipper is. She and Pip start him on a fitness program, to the amusement of the locals. Pasty tries to join but goes missing, and with the help of Professor Evie and her submarine they must find him.
73	20	"Wheeling Away"	Nick Wilson	13 November 2018
A picnic in the mountains seems like a good idea, until a puncture spoils the journey. Alan tries to fix it but the wheel takes a journey of its own, causing mayhem everywhere in Salty Cove, and it looks like it won't end.
74	21	"Star Spotting"	Arabella Warner	14 November 2018
Trevor the starfish enlists the help of Pasty and his friends to find his cousin on her birthday, but the sound of a song takes them down to the dark of the seabed. The directions of an old friend might help Pip and Alba see some stars after all.
75	22	"Pasty's Hat Trick"	Adam Peters	15 November 2018
It is Hat Day in Salty Cove, and everyone is dressing up in their finest hats, hoping to take the grand prize. But when Pasty finds the hat of his dreams and the grand prize itself goes missing, a curious creature starts to wander the town.
76	23	"Quiz Team"	Helena Smee	16 November 2018
Skipper has devised a quiz, and the teams split up to find out as much about Salty Cove as they can before four o'clock. Pasty takes an unexpected trip to the stars, and he and Hopper must race to get to the Village Hall in time.
77	24	"Rock Art"	Helena Smee	19 November 2018
Mrs Twitcher organises a painting day in the mountains, but Pip finds it difficult to master the skill Alba and Pasty have. Captain Bilge unexpectedly appears, and has lost both his treasure and his crew, which need to be found.
78	25	"The Salty Cove Band"	Arabella Warner	20 November 2018
Searching for more biscuits for Skipper's cheesecake, Pip and Alba discover strange and wonderful sounds wherever they go. This gives them a great idea for a homecoming present for Mrs Twitcher that she will never forget.
79	26	"How Does Your Garden Grow?"	Jimmy Hibbert	21 November 2018
When asking Alba about seeds and planting, Pasty has a great idea for growing a new type of tree, much to Hopper's amusement. But when the tree unexpectedly appears, Hopper makes a plan for a plant of his own, which doesn't go as planned.
