= Avenger Penguins =

Television series

- Also known as: Hell's Penguins
- Genre: Animation; Cartoon series; family; Comedy; Action; Adventure; Superhero
- Created by: Cosgrove Hall Productions
- Developed by: Brian Cosgrove; Mark Hall
- Written by: Jimmy Hibbert; Phil Jackson; Malcolm McGookin; Roger Stennett; Stefan Redfern; Rob Rackstraw
- Directed by: Jean Scott; Jean Flynn
- Voices of: Jimmy Hibbert; Lorelei King; Mike McShane; Rob Rackstraw
- Composer: Phil Bush
- Country of origin: United Kingdom
- Original language: English
- No. of series: 2
- No. of episodes: 26

Production
- Executive producers: Mark Hall; Brian Cosgrove
- Producer: Ben Turner
- Running time: 22 minutes
- Production companies: Cosgrove Hall Productions; Granada Television (Series 1); Cosgrove Hall Films; Anglia Television (Series 2)

Original release
- Network: ITV (CITV)
- Release: 22 September 1993 – 9 December 1994

Avenger Penguins is a British animated series produced by Cosgrove Hall Productions (Series 1)/Cosgrove Hall Films (Series 2) for Granada Television, with Thames International holding worldwide distribution rights. The series broadcast on Children's ITV for two series from 1993 to 1994.

The show has the distinction of being the last Cosgrove Hall production to be animated using hand-painted animation cels, and the last production not only to be produced by the studio under the name, Cosgrove Hall Productions but also under Thames' ownership and distribution. Series 2 was one of the first two productions produced under the rebranding, Cosgrove Hall Films. All 2D animated series from the studio thereafter would use computers for the ink and paint process; with the animation, drawings scanned and then digitally coloured.

== Details ==
The story revolves around three bike-riding Penguins that inhabit Big City, uniting to protect it and its citizens from the evil Caractacus P. Doom, an insane and reclusive criminal scientist. The Penguins attempt to prevent Doom's schemes but find themselves often hampered by their own miscommunicating and occasional scraps with other biker gangs infesting Big City, such as The Stink Brothers, a canine squad of Hell's Angels.

The cast, like Danger Mouse, Count Duckula and Victor and Hugo: Bunglers in Crime had with David Jason, boasted a star talent in a major role, this time in the form of American comedian Mike McShane as the Penguin's un-coordinated but brash leader Marlon, as well as the villainous Doom. To show how the series was mocking the often rushed animation style of the original TMNT series, two supporting characters are known as "The Badly Drawn Brothers" were always left with the design construction lines still showing out of deliberate neglect.

Pop culture references were found in abundance in many of the episodes and in the characters. Doom himself is patterned on an elderly Orson Welles, Harry Slime (who talks like Peter Lorre) in the meantime is based somewhat on Harry Lime, a character from the movie The Third Man. The Series 2 episode, "The 23rd Century" also served as a parody of Star Trek, and of science fiction in general.

== Voice cast ==
- Marlon: Mike McShane
- Rocky: Rob Rackstraw
- Bluey: Jimmy Hibbert
- Bella: Jimmy Hibbert
- Caractacus P. Doom: Mike McShane
- Harry Slime: Jimmy Hibbert
- Various other characters: Mike McShane, Rob Rackstraw, Jimmy Hibbert and Lorelei King.
- Theme song vocalist: Paul Young

== Development ==
The series was originally going to be called Hell's Penguins, although was it renamed out of concern for how the religious audience in the US would respond. 26 episodes aired from 1993 to 1994.

The series' animation was outsourced to Alfonso Productions, a Spanish-based animation studio also responsible for bringing Cosgrove Hall's shows Count Duckula, Victor and Hugo: Bunglers in Crime, Fantomcat, Sooty's Amazing Adventures and The Foxbusters to life, and in-house by Cosgrove Hall themselves.

As with most Cosgrove Hall cartoons, the series poked fun at the popular concepts of having creatures performing inhuman action feats and stunts in an animated medium, made popular by the then enormously successful Teenage Mutant Ninja Turtles franchise. The core of the show's theme is coincidentally similar to Biker Mice from Mars.

== Episodes ==
=== Series 1 (1993) ===
No.	Title	Original release date
1	"The President Is a Fish!"	22 September 1993
Doom is going to replace the president with a clone. Marlon and Rocky are captured running into Doom's tower and the two of them with the president are turned into fish, but Bluey comes to their aid. "The President is a Fish!" was written by Jimmy Hibbert, storyboarded by Ian Whitworth and directed by Jean Scott.
2	"The Hog Jamboree"	29 September 1993
Marlon enters the Hog Jamboree, which Doom has rigged. Bluey manages to reprogram Doom's seeker missile and win the Jamboree. "The Hog Jamboree" was written by Malcolm McGookin, storyboarded by Keith Scoble and directed by Jean Scott.
3	"Big City, Little City"	6 October 1993
Doom sends Slime to an orbiting satellite to shrink Big City's population and replace them with monsters. After evading the monsters, the Avenger Penguins head to Doom's salleite and terminate Doom's shrinking effects. "Big City, Little City" was written by Jimmy Hibbert, storyboarded by Neil Graham and directed by Jean Scott. />NOTES: There was no episode broadcast on 13 October 1993 due to the World Cup Football (Republic of Ireland v Spain).
4	"Computer Chaos"	13 October 1993
Doom brings some video game villains to life, sucks Marlon and Rocky into the game and tries to squich them. Bluey the computer expert comes to the rescue. "Computer Chaos" was written by Malcolm McGookin, storyboarded by Keith Scoble and directed by Jean Scott.
5	"I Married An Android!"	20 October 1993
Doom creates an android to brainwash Marlon into a life of suburban bliss and blandness so that Rocky and Bluey are leaderless and uninspired. "I Married an Android!" was written by Roger Stennett, storyboarded by Keith Scoble and directed by Jean Scott.
6	"Cat Pig-Cat of Iron"	27 October 1993
Irv's 'nephew' Billy Neptune comes to stay with the Penguins. He seems convinced that he is a super-hero but manages to save the Avenger Penguins in the end when Doom captures them. "Cat Pig-Cat of Iron" was written by Jimmy Hibbert, storyboarded by Neil Graham and directed by Jean Scott.
7	"Nightmare at Tea-Time"	3 November 1993
Mr. Doom's nightmare machine invades the Avenger Penguins dreams but eventually turns on its master. (Nightmare at Tea-Time references Planet Cute from 'The Vampire Strikes Back' an episode of 'Count Duckula') "Nightmare at Tea-Time" was written by Roger Stennett, storyboarded by Keith Scoble and directed by Jean Scott.
8	"Star Struck"	10 November 1993
A movie fan alien visits a film set where Doom and Slime are trying to kill the Avenger Penguins who are there as stuntmen. "Star Struck" references 'E.T.', 'Star Wars' and Blackadder. It is the first appearance of Dolores Devine. "Star Struck" was written by Malcolm McGookin, storyboarded by Neil Graham and directed by Jean Scott.
9	"The Quantum Mechanic"	17 November 1993
Doom uses Bluey's brain to create mind monsters from Bluey's favourite show, Quantum Mechanic and Googerplex. Bella manages to turn Quantum against Doom and save the Avenger Penguins. "The Quantum Mechanic" was written by Jimmy Hibbert and storyboarded and directed by Joan Scott.
10	"The Wild, Wild, Wild, Wild West"	24 November 1993
Professor Boring (a cheery fellow) and his wife Euphoria (a depressed woman) have their time machine's transanium crystal stolen enabling Doom to send Slime back to the old west to stake claims on all the gold. "The Wild, Wild, Wild, Wild West" was written by Malcolm McGookin, storyboarded by Keith Scoble and directed by Jean Scott.
11	"The Labyrinth of Doom"	1 December 1993
The Avenger Penguins and The Stink Brothers enter an underground motorcycle challenge along with Carberetta Gasoline, a tough lady biker who starts off working for Doom but eventually changes her mind and becomes friends with the Avenger Penguins. "The Labyrinth of Doom" was written by Roger Stennett, storyboarded by Keith Scoble and directed by Jean Scott.
12	"A Winter's Tale"	8 December 1993
Doom sacks Slime and sends him out into the cold where he befriends the Sweetheart Fairy Angel. Together they get revenge on Doom who is seeking to make the Avenger Penguins homeless. "A Winter's Tale" was written by Philip Jackson, storyboarded by Stephen Simpson and directed by Jean Scott.
13	"The Revenge of Doom"	15 December 1993
After a year trapped on Mars, Doom returns to seek revenge and challenges the Avenger Penguins to a contest which is called the Gauntlet. "The Revenge of Doom" was written by Roger Stennett, storyboarded by Keith Scoble and directed by Jean Scott.

=== Series 2 (1994) ===
No.	Title	Original release date
1	"The Avenger Penguins in the 23rd Century"	16 September 1994
The Avenger Penguins are brought to the future to head to the Doomstar of Doom's descendant Lucidious Q. Doom and stop her firing the freezing ray on the globe. "The Avenger Penguins in the 23rd Century" was originally called "Where No Penguin Has Gone Before". "The Avenger Penguins in the 23rd Century"/"Where No Penguin Has Gone Before" was written by Roger Stennett, storyboarded by Wayne Thomas and directed by Jean Flynn.
2	"Mommy's Boy"	23 September 1994
When Rocky's mother visits and drags him out to the shops, it gives 'Dave Penguin' a perfect chance to take his place. "Mommy's Boy" was written by Rob Rackstraw and Stefan Redfern, storyboarded by José Solis and directed by Jean Flynn.
3	"Who's Afraid of the Big Bad Penguin?"	30 September 1994
Doom replaces Slime with the more efficient, but traitorous Miss DeMeanor. Slime and Doom hatch a plan with the Avenger Penguins to get her to leave. "Who's Afraid of the Big Bad Penguin?" was written by Roger Stennett, storyboarded by Wayne Thomas and directed by Jean Flynn.
4	"Surprise Fate"	7 October 1994
The Avenger Penguins appear as guests on a dating show. Doom rigs the contest so Marlon wins a date with escaped loony, Annabelle the Animal, who has a desire to eat anything that's black and white, for example PENGUINS! "Surprise Fate" was written by Rob Rackstraw and Stefan Redfern, storyboarded by Richard Nye and directed by Jean Flynn.
5	"High Doom"	14 October 1994
The old Doc relates a tale from the Wild West, where Beauregarde Doom and his gangsters try and rob a bank and some penguin lawmen try to escape Humungously Big Mad Joe. "High Doom" was written by Malcolm McGookin, storyboarded by José Solis and directed by Jean Flynn.
6	"The Jewel in the Crown"	21 October 1994
With Marlon and Bluey trapped at a sleazy night-club where Doom is negotiating a deal for a diamond. Rocky, Slime and Dolores Devine travel (by accident) to an ancient temple. "The Jewel in the Crown" was written by Roger Stennett, storyboarded by Neil Graham and directed by Jean Flynn.
7	"The Avenger Penguins' Christmas Carol"	28 October 1994
Charles Dickens' novel "A Christmas Carol" is parodied as Doom realises he must restore power to the city after he blacks it out. "The Avenger Penguins' Christmas Carol" was written by Jimmy Hibbert, storyboarded by Wayne Thomas and directed by Jean Flynn.
8	"Fishfinger"	4 November 1994
Rocky is hired by the President to infiltrate Zigmund Fishfinger's (Doom's) lair and rescue Miss Leatherclad-Fullerain. Marlon and Bluey sneak along for the spoofed version of Goldfinger. "Fishfinger" was written by Jimmy Hibbert, storyboarded by Vincent James and Jez Hall and directed by Jean Flynn.
9	"Disgusting Or What?"	11 November 1994
Mr. Doom under-estimates the power of his latest invention, a monster composed of the most horrible garbage in the city. Meanwhile, after Marlon gets knocked on the head, he starts thinking he is his favourite movie hero, Valentine Lovescones. "Disgusting Or What?" was written by Rob Rackstraw and Stefan Redfern, storyboarded by José Solis and directed by Jean Flynn.
10	"Rock 'n Roll Penguins"	18 November 1994
Much of "Rock 'n Roll Penguins" has the characters bursting into song. Doom is going to blow up the Avenger Penguins with their own bikes, but Slime has not made the preparations for that. "Rock 'n Roll Penguins" was written by Jimmy Hibbert, storyboarded by Jean Flynn, Jez Hall, and Ben Turner and directed by Jean Flynn.
11	"The Computer of Doom"	25 November 1994
Bluey's addiction to computer games comes in useful when Doom invades the international computer network with a virus. "The Computer of Doom" was written by Roger Stennett, storyboarded by Neil Graham and directed by Jean Flynn.
12	"Sherlock's Penguins"	2 December 1994
The Avenger Penguins travel to London to tackle Caractacus P. Doom's cousin, Professor Moriarty, who has unleashed a drug into the water supply which causes everyone to treat each other unfairly. "Sherlock's Penguins" was written by Malcolm McGookin, storyboarded by John Martin and directed by Jean Flynn.
13	"The Beauties and the Beasts"	9 December 1994
After Slime's failure to get the Avenger Penguins, Doom creates two ladies who can switch between pretty and ugly, but they blow themselves up. Then Slime takes over Doom's place. "The Beauties and the Beasts" was written by Malcolm McGookin, storyboarded by Wayne Thomas and directed by Jean Flynn.

== DVD and VHS releases ==
=== DVD releases ===
The entire series was released on a three-disc DVD box set in March 2006 by Delta Leisure Group PLC and Fremantle Media.

==== Complete set ====
Title	Region 1	Region 2	Region 4
Avenger Penguins	Unreleased in Region 1	20 March 2006	Unreleased in Region 4

==== Individual episodes ====
Title	Region 1	Region 2	Region 4
Avenger Penguins: The President is a Fish!	Unreleased in Region 1	30 September 2005	Unreleased in Region 4
Avenger Penguins: CatPig - Cat of Iron	Unreleased in Region 1	30 September 2005	Unreleased in Region 4
Avenger Penguins in the 23rd Century	Unreleased in Region 1	30 September 2005	Unreleased in Region 4
Avenger Penguins: A Christmas Carol	Unreleased in Region 1	30 September 2005	Unreleased in Region 4

=== VHS releases ===
During the show's original run, Avenger Penguins episodes were released on 3 VHS titles from Thames Video and Arena Home Entertainment, often in a different sequence than that when televised.

VHS title	Release date	Episodes
Avenger Penguins: Volume 1 (ARE1001)	31 July 1995	The Wild Wild Wild Wild West!, The President is a Fish, The Labyrinth of Doom
Avenger Penguins: Volume 2 (ARE1003)	25 September 1995	The Hog Jamboree, Quantum Mechanic, A Winter's Tale
Avenger Penguins: Volume 3 (ARE1009)	13 November 1995	The Revenge of Doom, Big City Little City, Computer Chaos

In Australia, there were six videos from Reel Entertainment releasing all the episodes of series 1 and one episode of series 2. Each of them contained 2 episodes.

== See also ==
- Biker Mice from Mars
