= The Talking Parcel =

- First edition
- Author: Gerald Durrell
- Cover artist: Liza James
- Language: English
- Genre: Children's
- Publisher: Collins
- Publication date: 1974
- Publication place: United Kingdom

The Talking Parcel (also published as The Battle for Castle Cockatrice) is a 1974 book by Gerald Durrell in which children are transported to the fantasy land of Mythologia to save it from cockatrices. They are aided by a talking parrot and encounter many other magical creatures, including a mooncalf.

The book has been translated into a number of languages, including Czech, Estonian, Italian, Russian, Spanish, German (as "Das geheimnisvolle Paket"), and Ukrainian.

== Synopsis ==
Peter and Simon, two boys from England, join their cousin Penelope and her father Henry, who live in Peloponnese, Greece for the summer holidays. While taking a tour in an inflatable dinghy on their first day, the children rest on a sandbank, where Penelope encounters a strange, paper-wrapped parcel from which two voices emanate. Unwrapping the parcel, the children find a cage with a clothed, sentient parrot and a tiny golden spider inside, who introduce themselves as Parrot (short for "Percival, Archibald, Reginald, Roderick, Oscar, Theophilus") and Dulcibelle. Parrot proclaims them both to be denizens of a hidden subterranean realm called Mythologia, founded centuries ago by the wizard Hengist Hannibal ("H.H.") Junketberry to serve as a sanctuary for the last mythological beasts on Earth. Due to space restrictions, the beast population must be strictly regulated, but recently the resident Cockatrices have risen in rebellion and, with the assistance of their Toad egg-breeders, are working on drastically expanding their numbers and taking over Mythologia. Parrot, as one of H.H.'s chief assistants, tried to reason with the Cockatrices, but the Toads packed him and Dulcibelle into the parcel and sent them adrift into the human world.

After hearing this story, the children declare to help Parrot in finding H.H. and overcoming the Cockatrices. They seek out a decommissioned but sentient locomotive named Madame Hortense, who takes them to the entrance of the tunnel leading to Mythologia. During their journey to H.H.'s refuge in the Crystal Caves (a dragon hatching ground), they encounter a number of creatures both weird and wondrous. Penelope saves Septimus, the crown prince of the Unicorns, from a Cockatrice hunting him, which wins them the Unicorns' allegiance, and discovers that Cockatrices are allergic to lavender. Upon finding H.H., they learn from him that the Cockatrices have captured two of Mythologia's sacred Three Books of Government, including his Book of Spells, to (unsuccessfully so far) accelerate the hatching of their eggs.

H.H. then asks Penelope to calm down Tabitha, a Dragon who is despondent because she had naively allowed the Cockatrices to steal the eggs of her kin. While talking with her, Penelope catches a Toad spying on them. Upon questioning, the Toad, who introduces himself as Ethelred, divulges the existence of a drain which leads into Cockatrice Castle, and is made to switch his allegiance by having him titled a "master counter-spy". With Ethelred's help, the children find the Books of Government, which provide them with the information that Cockatrices can be overcome by a Weasel's bite, but only if those Weasels have consumed some rue beforehand. Its use is made all the more vital because the Weasels are natural cowards and the herb would make them more belligerent, but the only known supply in Mythologia is to be found in the Mandrake Forest, on Werewolf Island in the Singing Sea.

After escaping the castle and sharing their discovery with H.H., Tabitha and Dulcibelle, the children, Parrot and Ethelred set out to gather allies: first in Weaseldom, the Weasels' domain under their lords Duke Wensleydale and Duchess Winifred; then with the Griffons, Mythologia's gold miners. Afterwards, they set out on the children's dinghy across the Singing Sea, where they encounter the nobility-obsessed Mermaid Desdemona and the dull-witted, hearing-impaired Sea Serpent Oswald, with the latter giving them a tow towards Werewolf Island. Arriving there, Parrot, Peter and Simon set out to find the rue, leaving Penelope and Ethelred with the boat. After Ethelred leaves to keep a lookout, Penelope encounters one of the island's resident Firedrakes, Fenella, who warns her that the indigenous Will-o'-the-Wisps have alerted the Werewolves to their presence. Penelope runs after Parrot and her cousins to warn them, but she and the boys are captured by the Werewolves, to be turned into Werewolves themselves. Alerted by Fenella, Ethelred comes to their rescue, and after being rejoined by Parrot, they escape the Werewolves with Oswald's help and in possession of a sizable supply of rue.

Once back in the Crystal Caves, preparations for the attack on Cockatrice Castle are made, with Oswald, the Mermaids, and even Ethelred and Fenella's relatives joining the cause. While Parrot, Peter, Simon and most of their allies assault the castle directly, a small strike force led by Penelope and Ethelred infiltrates the dungeons through its drainage system and secures the Books of Government before the Cockatrices can destroy them out of spite. Upon their defeat, the Cockatrices are banished to a lonely island in the Singing Sea. After a cordial farewell, the children leave Mythologia with the promise to return again next year.

== Film adaptation ==
The Talking Parcel
- Directed by: Brian Cosgrove
- Written by: Gerald Durrell (novel); Rosemary Anne Sisson (writer)
- Produced by: Brian Cosgrove; Mark Hall
- Edited by: John McManus; Dave Street
- Music by: David Rohl; Woolly Wolstenholme
- Production company: Cosgrove Hall Films
- Release date: 26 December 1978
- Running time: 60 minutes (U.S.); 40 minutes (UK)
- Country: United Kingdom
- Language: English

The novel was made into an animated feature for television by Cosgrove Hall Films in 1978, debuting on ITV. The film differs from the book in many details, mainly by including Penelope as the only human protagonist.

=== Voice cast ===
- Lisa Norris - Penelope
- Freddie Jones - Parrot
- Mollie Sugden - Hortense, the Flying Train
- Roy Kinnear - Ethelred, the Toad
- Edward Kelsey - H.H. Junketbury
- Windsor Davies - Chief Cockatrice
- Michael Hordern - Oswald, the Sea Serpent
- Peter Woodthorpe - Werewolf
- Harvey Ashby - Duke Wensleydale
- Raymond Mason
- Daphne Oxenford
