= The Likeaballs =

British television series

The Likeaballs is a British cartoon series created by Jim Quick that airs on BBC One and CBBC. It began production in 2006 and premiered on CBBC on BBC One on 8 January 2007. It was produced by Cosgrove Hall Films.

== Themes ==
The show is about a group of ball-shaped round hounds whose home planet was destroyed. They take part in football matches. They compete against their deadly rivals The Dislikeaballs. All characters names are puns on words ending in "-able", e.g. inflatable is Inflataball etc. The only exceptions being Pam & Dan, spoofs of BBC News 24 sports reporters.

== Episode titles ==
All episode titles are nouns or verbs, e.g. "Hat", Lucky or "Game" etc. Only 26 episodes were made.

1. Grannits
2. Prisoner
3. Bugbots
4. Giant
5. Slimey
6. Tiddly
7. Ballbasket
8. System
9. Snowy
10. Training
11. Shield
12. Lucky
13. Monopod
14. Guilty
15. Bears
16. Cows
17. Sick
18. Lost
19. Smelly
20. Hat
21. Trophy
22. Manners
23. Scary
24. Truth
25. Robot
26. Television
