= Alias the Jester =

British animated television series

- Created by: Brian Cosgrove; Mark Hall
- Starring: Richard Briers; Jimmy Hibbert; Myfanwy Talog; Brian Trueman; Brian Wilde
- Opening theme: "Alias the Jester" by Keith Hopwood and Malcolm Rowe
- Country of origin: United Kingdom
- Original language: English
- No. of episodes: 13

Production
- Executive producer: John Hambley
- Running time: 10 minutes
- Production company: Cosgrove Hall Productions

Original release
- Network: ITV (CITV)
- Release: 13 November 1985 – 20 February 1986

Alias the Jester is a British animated series created by Cosgrove Hall Productions, airing in 13 episodes on ITV starting on 13 November 1985. The Australian Broadcasting Corporation aired the show in 1987 during their after school timeslot and it is considered one of the Classic ABC shows. The show was also aired on TVNZ. GBC TV in Gibraltar aired the series several times in the late 1980s, mainly as a filler during the children's 6:30pm–7:30pm weekday slot.

It won the BAFTA Award for Best Short Animation at the 39th British Academy Film Awards.

== Synopsis ==
The show follows the adventures of a time traveller by the name of Alias and his dog-like companion Boswell. After their malfunctioning ship gets stuck in the Earth's magnetic pole, they crash-land in a Middle Age kingdom called Houghton Bottoms, ruled by the diminutive King Arthur and his wife Queen Edith with their daughter Princess Amaranth.

Taking up a secret identity of sorts as Alias the Jester, he gains employment at the court and befriends the bumbling court wizard Meredith. When the situation calls for it, Alias instantly changes back into his red uniform, which enables him to fly, and a degree of super strength, which he can use to face the various villains of the show. Each episode inevitably ends with Arthur firing Alias and Meredith (exception being the initial episode in which Arthur proclaims "you're hired").

== Characters ==
Alias the Jester – A "time traveller bold" as said in the title track. After crashing in the Middle Ages he gets a job as a jester for King Arthur. He also fights crime as the Red Knight, who the wizard Meredith believes he summoned. Alias is a stereotypical hero in many ways, possessing an urge to do what is right; however, he also has a distinct but subtle sarcastic edge, which he sometimes uses in conversation, especially with Meredith. The feathers on his head appear to be part of his head rather than his suit as they are seen moving and could be the source of his flight.

Boswell – Alias' dog-like alien companion, apparently possessing a fairly high intellect as he is able to understand Alias and take orders. He is, however, only able to communicate with beeping and honking sounds, which presumably make up his language. Often he is among the first to sense danger.

Meredith – The bumbling but well-meaning court wizard of King Arthur. In an attempt to save the kingdom from its various enemies, he tried to summon a magical Red Knight. At that moment, completely coincidentally, Alias' ship crashed. From that point on, Meredith believes him to be the hero he had summoned.

== Episodes ==
No.	Title	Original release date
1	"Alias the Jester"	13 November 1985
After a technical fault with his ship, Alias and his companion Boswell crash land in Houghton Bottoms in Medieval times. He rescues a baby dragon who his mother cannot find. Later, Meredith recognises the two feathers on Alias' head so in order to hide his feathers Alias disguises himself as a Jester, before he gets hired he has to tell a joke to King Arthur unfortunately Alias does not know what a joke is and then he tells that he is not a Jester and that his ship crashed into Houghton Bottoms however Arthur takes it as a joke and then hires him along with Meredith. Note: This is the first episode of the series, so the full title card is not shown and also Alias gets hired in this episode while in all the later episodes he will be fired for various reasons.
2	"The Ring"	20 November 1985
Meredith finds a ring inside a book and takes him to an Island Alias and Boswell come too and they meet a slimy creature who used to be a human but was turned to a slimy creature by a villain named the Black Najjer and he stole his magic stick so Alias, Boswell and Meredith go to see the Black Najjer who eventually gets turned into a slimy creature in the end the slimy creature gets turned back to a human and all the other wizards, when they go back to the castle they crach land on King Arthur's pool table who eventually fires them. Note: This the first episode with the full opening sequence and the first episode in which Alias and sometimes Meredith as well gets fired in the end somehow he gets his job back in the next episode.
3	"The Amazing Dancing Bear"	27 November 1985
King Arthur tells Alias to get The Amazing Dancing Bear.
4	"The Viking Airship"	4 December 1985
Vikings come to Houghton Bottoms.
5	"Ready When You Are, King Arthur!"	11 December 1985
A crew of film produces come to Houghton Bottoms to make a film called The Kidnapped Princess but really they are there to kidnap Princess Amaranth.
6	"The Giant's Visit"	18 December 1985
A family of Giants visit Houghton Bottoms.
7	"The Walking Island"	10 January 1986
8	"Monster of the Lake"	17 January 1986
A monster lurks from the lake of Houghton Bottoms.
9	"Magic Metal"	24 January 1986
A con man uses Sir Pinkley to buy one of the armors so he can control Sir Pinkley in the Armour.
10	"The Lost Ark"	31 January 1986
An ark is lost.
11	"Revenge of the Najjer"	6 February 1986
The Black Najjer as a slimy creature comes back to Houghton Bottoms for Revenge, he soon uses Meredith's potions to make himself Human again and turns Meredith into a slimy creature and then announces to King Arthur and Queen Edith that he is the new court wizard but his plans backfire thanks to Alias the Jester and is soon turned back into a slimy creature again but this time he is pink. Meredith is turned back to a human again and King Arthur says that he is reinstated only to be interrupted by Alias the Jester who is then fired.
12	"Fiery Fred"	13 February 1986
A creature named Fiery Fred comes to Houghton Bottoms. Goof: When Alias' hat comes off while catching Fiery Fred, it reveals his head but there should be yellow feathers on his head because in reality, his feathers are part of head, because whenever Boswell gives signals when Alias is wearing his jester clothes his feathers which are hidden inside his hat.
13	"Amaranth and the Beast"	20 February 1986
Princess Amaranth is kidnapped by the Beast. Note: this episode is a parody of Beauty and the Beast.

== Home releases ==
=== VHS ===
VHS title	Release date	Episodes
Alias the Jester – The Ring (TV9900)	31 March 1986	Alias the Jester, The Ring, The Viking Airship, The Walking Island, Monster of the Lake, Amaranth and The Beast
Alias the Jester – The Amazing Dancing Bear	17 August 1987	The Amazing Dancing Bear, Ready When You Are, King Arthur!, The Giant's Visit, Magic Metal, The Lost Ark, Fiery Fred
Children's Favourites – Volume 1 (TV8010)	1 February 1988	Revenge of the Najjer (Compilation VHS with 'The Wind in the Willows' and 'Danger Mouse')
Most Wanted Classic Kids TV	2003	The Viking Airship (Compilation VHS with 'Victor and Hugo: Bunglers in Crime', 'Avenger Penguins' and 'Danger Mouse')

=== DVD ===
The entire series was released on DVD in March 2006 alongside Avenger Penguins.

== Voice cast ==
- Richard Briers as Alias, The Black Najjer
- Jimmy Hibbert as Boswell, Queen Edith, Sir Pinkly
- Myfanwy Talog as Princess Amaranth
- Brian Trueman as King Arthur, The Vikings
- Brian Wilde as Meredith
