= CHF Entertainment =

English animation studio

- Formerly: Cosgrove Hall Fitzpatrick Entertainment (2011); CHF Entertainment (2011–2019)
- Predecessor: Cosgrove Hall Films
- Founded: 2011
- Founders: Brian Cosgrove; Mark Hall; Francis Fitzpatrick
- Defunct: 2019
- Products: Pip Ahoy!

CHF Entertainment (originally established as Cosgrove Hall Fitzpatrick Entertainment) was an animation studio formed in 2011. It was the reincarnation of the animation company Cosgrove Hall Films which closed in 2009 after 33 years. Brian Cosgrove and Mark Hall formed and ran the original Cosgrove Hall creating over 1000 episodes of animated programs such as Danger Mouse, Cockleshell Bay, Count Duckula, Lavender Castle and The Wind in the Willows, and produced Fifi and the Flowertots, Postman Pat, and Roary the Racing Car. They won a number of awards, including six BAFTAs and two international Emmys.

In November 2012, Brian Cosgrove received the British Academy of Film and Television Arts' Special Award for outstanding creative contribution to the industry at the British Academy of Children's Awards.

Brian Cosgrove and Mark Hall came out of retirement in 2011 to form CHF Entertainment with Francis Fitzpatrick. Fitzpatrick co-created Jakers! The Adventures of Piggley Winks which won a number of Emmy Awards. A new children's story, Pip!, was created. They believed it would turn into a major worldwide TV series. Hall died in November 2011 before this could be realized, and was replaced by his son Simon Hall.

CHF Entertainment is currently working on a number of children's shows, including Pip Ahoy!, the story of a loveable sea pup aimed at pre-school children; and HeroGliffix, targeted at a slightly older audience. Pip! was showcased at MIPCom Global Sales Fair in Cannes in October 2011 and was flagged by the industry as being 'one to watch'. There were 52 eleven-minute episodes planned, of whom were released in spring 2013.

In 2012, David Jason provided the voice of 'Skipper', one of the show's leading characters. Jason had provided voices for a number of Cosgrove Hall's animated series, including Danger Mouse, The Wind in the Willows, and Count Duckula.

Magic Marlon began on Milkshake! in spring/summer of 2016.

On 6 June 2019, the closure of CHF Entertainment's animation department was announced, but would not affect the production of 2 more series of Daisy & Ollie, which will be undertaken by Hoopla Animation.
