= Malcolm McGookin =

British cartoonist

Malcolm McGookin (born Kilwinning, Scotland) is a British cartoonist whose work appears mainly in the US, UK and Australia. He also known for his work as an animator, illustrator and author.

== Cartooning career ==
Malc McGookin began cartooning as a teenager working for the Ardrossan and Saltcoats Herald in Scotland. By 18 he had his first regular feature in British weekly magazines. After attending college to develop an animation showreel, McGookin undertook a career at Cosgrove Hall, starting out as an animation assistant, later to become a key animator and scriptwriter. He divides his time between his home in Dorset and an underground house in Coober Pedy, Australia, where he spends his time writing music, illustrating and editorial cartooning for outlets in the English-speaking world, as well as mining for opals.

As an animator

- Count Duckula
- Danger Mouse
- Victor and Hugo
- Roald Dahl's The BFG (feature film version)

== Other works ==
McGookin has contributed illustrations to the Darwin Awards series of books.

== Personal life ==
McGookin has three sons. He has attained the UEFA "B" Licence twice, and presently holds an UEFA International Coaching Licence.
