= Albie (TV series) =

Children's animated television series

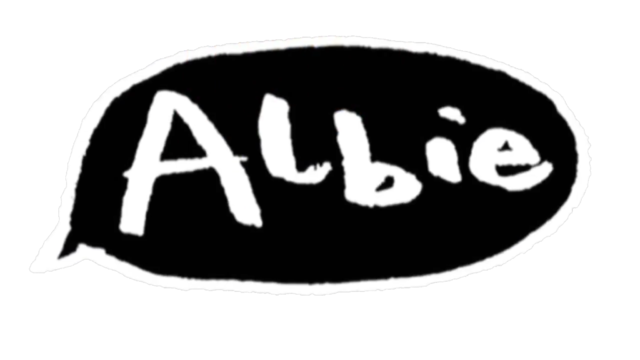
- Genre: Animation; Children’s animation
- Created by: Andy Cutbill
- Developed by: Granada plc
- Directed by: Francis Vose
- Starring: Rob Rackstraw; Marc Silk; Melissa Sinden; Janet James
- Opening theme: "This is Albie's World" by Keith Hopwood
- Ending theme: "This is Albie's World" by Keith Hopwood (Instrumental)
- Composer: Keith Hopwood
- Country of origin: United Kingdom
- Original language: English
- No. of series: 2
- No. of episodes: 26

Production
- Executive producer: Mark Hall
- Producer: Francis Vose
- Running time: 10 minutes
- Production company: Cosgrove Hall Films

Original release
- Network: ITV (CITV)
- Release: 11 June 2002 – 21 July 2004

Albie is a British animated series about a five-year-old boy with a wild, distorted imagination. Unfortunately, this gets him into trouble with his friends, family and his neighbour, the grouchy Mr. Kidhater-Cox. Albie was created by award-winning children's author Andy Cutbill and was based on his own childhood. Andy also helped develop Rupert Bear, Follow the Magic... for Channel 5. These series can be often seen repeated on the ITV children's digital channel, CITV.

== Overview ==
The concept of Albie involves a small boy who keeps encountering exotic animals in his garden whose sole purpose seem to be to get him into trouble. This includes a herd of Welsh water buffalo on a mission to nick the bath from Albie's house, Geordie elephants obsessed with buns and a couple of Sahara-missing cockney camels living in the sand-pit. Albie's interaction with the animals is left open as to whether the occurrences are real or not.

== Episodes ==
=== Series 1 (2002) ===
No. in season	Title	Original release date
1	"Another Rumba Blunder"	June 11, 2002
Reg and Spike find a piece of paper with directions on it, and immediately decide that it's a treasure map.
2	"The Collectors Come Knocking"	June 18, 2002
When an aeroplane door lands in Albie's sandpit, he knows it's going to be one of those days.
3	"Mystery of the Chinese Bones"	June 25, 2002
Mr. Kidhater-Cox wakes up one morning to find Lucy, his dog, has gone missing, and that next door, Albie has decided to dig to China from the sandpit.
4	"It Came from Under the House"	July 2, 2002
Albie falls down a mysterious hole in the garden one morning and lands in the basement under the house.
5	"The Woodshed Saga"	July 9, 2002
Fleeing from Mary in a game of high-stakes hide-and-seek, Albie takes cover in the woodshed.
6	"Demolition Duo"	July 16, 2002
Albie is rather shocked to find a huge crane in his garden one morning, and is even more surprised when he finds it's being driven by two camels.
7	"Creatures from the Rhondda Valley"	July 23, 2002
Albie wakes in the night to go to the bathroom. But when he gets there, he finds that the bathroom fixtures have been removed.
8	"Ooh Aah Cha Cha Cha"	July 30, 2002
While preparing a sandwich in the kitchen one morning, Albie discovers a hungry elephant in the cupboard.
9	"They Came Wearing Duffle Coats"	August 6, 2002
Vince the gardener is knocked out by a low branch. While he's unconscious, three hippos take advantage of the situation and hide him in the azaleas.
10	"News Flash"	August 13, 2002
Albie's morning viewing is interrupted by a newsflash: a violent lunatic is on the loose... and according to the picture, it's Vulgar Olga!
11	"Party Pooper Pandemonium"	August 20, 2002
Mary announces there's going to be a birthday party, her birthday party, and Albie's given the job to hand out the invitations.
12	"Teaser in a Freezer"	August 27, 2002
Albie is building a snowman when he's interrupted by Mr. Kidhater-Cox, who accuses him of stealing his new gloves.
13	"Imp on the Loose"	September 3, 2002
Albie awakes one morning to find himself the prime suspect in a serious crime. Mr. Kidhater-Cox's car has been stolen, and he demands justice.

=== Series 2 (2004) ===
No. in season	Title	Original release date
1	"High Diving"	July 5, 2004
Albie lands in hot water when a herd of Welsh water buffalo try to spice up their singing act with a spot of diving.
2	"Caught in a Flap"	July 6, 2004
Albie's piano lesson with Olga is interrupted when he spots three hippos acting suspiciously in the garden.
3	"The Full Moon"	July 7, 2004
Mary dares Albie, Reg and Spike to spend a night outside in the garden.
4	"A Hunting We Will Go"	July 8, 2004
Albie will do anything to get out of piano lessons with Olga, but are there really elk in the garden?
5	"Operation: Occupation"	July 9, 2004
The animals hatch a plan to get inside Albie's house to avoid the cold.
6	"Diamond Heist"	July 12, 2004
When Mr. Khan's valuable diamond is stolen, Albie investigates the theft.
7	"Caught By the Ghoulies"	July 13, 2004
Mr. Kidhater-Cox sets up a trap to prevent anybody from stealing his prize pumpkin.
8	"Calling All Animals"	July 14, 2004
Albie's garden is being cleared to make way for a rocket launch pad.
9	"Lovely Weather for Boats"	July 15, 2004
The gnus set sail in Mr. Kidhater-Cox's boat in the garden.
10	"Open to the Public"	July 16, 2004
Mr. Kidhater-Cox opens his garden to the public, and suspects Albie of destroying his petunias.
11	"Are You There, Mother?"	July 19, 2004
Albie and his brothers are watching a documentary about life on other worlds. When the picture vanishes, Albie thinks it's the weather, while Reg and Spike think it's aliens. It turns out to be elephants stealing the aerial.
12	"Quick on the Draw"	July 20, 2004
When Albie draws a couple of moose on his blackboard one evening, Mary warns him that they'll give him nightmares.
13	"All Quiet on the Garden Front"	July 21, 2004
Albie finds a broken lamp, and is set to thinking about it.

== Broadcast history ==
- UK
  - CITV (2000–2001)
- Australia
  - ABC TV (2001–2006)
- New Zealand
  - TV3
- France
  - TF1 (2002)
- Spain
  - La 2 (2003–2005)
- Portugal
  - Canal Panda

== Awards ==
- Best Children's Series award at the British Animation Awards, 2002
- Pulcinella award (the Canal Grande prize at the Cartoons on the Bay Festival in Positano, Italy for Best European Programme)
- Best Young Writer Category at the B+ Young Talent Awards 2002

== Books ==
- Albie (2 September 2002)
- Albie and the Big Race (31 October 2004)
- Albie and the Space Rocket (6 March 2006)

These stories were later compiled into The Big Book of Albie (released on 1 January 2011)
