= Creepy Crawlies =

- Created by: Brian Cosgrove and Mark Hall
- Starring: Paul Nicholas
- Country of origin: United Kingdom
- No. of episodes: 52

Production
- Running time: 10 mins
- Production company: Cosgrove Hall Productions

Original release
- Network: ITV (CITV)
- Release: 7 January 1987 – 8 August 1989

Creepy Crawlies is a stop motion animation series created by Cosgrove Hall Productions. The series consisted of 52 ten-minute episodes, which were broadcast on Children's ITV between 1987 and 1989. All episodes were written by Peter Reeves and directed by Franc Vose and Brian Little; narration and character voices were provided by Paul Nicholas.

== Overview ==
The series was based upon the day-to-day life of a group of common minibeasts (small invertebrate creatures such as arthropods, gastropods and worms) that lived at the bottom of a garden around an old sundial.

== Characters ==
- Mr Harrison the snail
- Suppose the worm
- Ariadne the spider
- Anorak the pillbug (woodlouse)
- Ladybird the ladybird
- Lambeth the beetle
- Ancient the caterpillar

== Home media ==
The Video Collection and Thames Video released 2 VHS tapes containing 5 episodes each.

VHS title	Release date	Episodes
Creepy Crawlies (TV9944)	9 February 1987	The Cold, Lambeth the Conqueror, Storm in a Tea Cup, The Leaving, The Best Day Ever
Creepy Crawlies - Sundial Stories (TV9970)	16 November 1987	The Red Voice, Pleasurabolosities, The Stone Dream, The Art Noise, When the Garden Lost its Grip
