= John Hambley (producer) =

British television and film producer

- Occupations: Producer; Screenwriter
- Notable work: Minder; The Wind in the Willows; Count Duckula; Danger Mouse; The BFG; A Tale of Two Toads

John Hambley is a British producer and screenwriter. He was executive producer for television series such as Minder, The Wind in the Willows, Danger Mouse and Count Duckula. He also produced the film The BFG, a movie for which he wrote the script.
