= Danger Mouse =

Danger Mouse is a British action cartoon which has had two incarnations:

- Danger Mouse (1981 TV series), a 1981 British animated television series
- Danger Mouse (2015 TV series), a 2015 reboot of the British animated television series

Danger Mouse may also refer to:

- Danger Mouse (musician) (born 1977), American musician, DJ and producer
- DangerMouse, the nickname of David Morgan-Mar, an Australian physicist and webcomic creator
