= Cosgrove Hall Films =

British animation studio

- Final logo (1994-2009)

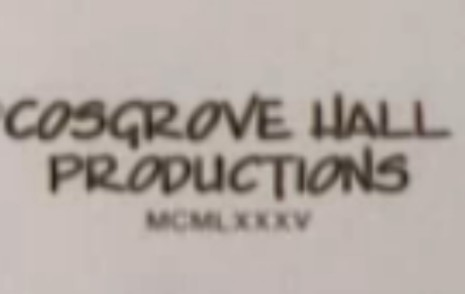
- Second logo of Cosgrove Hall Productions (1985-1993); taken from Alias the Jester
- Industry: Animation
- Predecessor: Stop Frame Productions
- Founded: 1976; 50 years ago (original; Cosgrove Hall Productions); 15 November 1993; 32 years ago (revival; Cosgrove Hall Films)
- Founders: Brian Cosgrove; Mark Hall
- Defunct: 1993; 33 years ago (as Cosgrove Hall Productions); 26 October 2009; 17 years ago (as Cosgrove Hall Films)
- Fate: 1993: Closed; reopened as Cosgrove Hall Films; 2009: Folded into ITV plc
- Successor: Company: Cosgrove Hall Fitzpatrick Entertainment, Ltd. ITV plc Library: Boat Rocker Studios (mostly)
- Headquarters: Chorlton-cum-Hardy, Manchester, England
- Key people: Brian Cosgrove; Mark Hall; Keith Scoble; Chris Randall; Brian Trueman
- Owner: ITV plc
- Parent: Original: Thames Television; Revival: Anglia Television Entertainment/ITEL (Anglia Television/HBO) (1993–2000, 75%); Granada Media Group/Granada plc (2000–2004, 75%); ITV plc (2004–2009)
- Website: chfentertainment.com

Cosgrove Hall Films was a British animation studio founded by Brian Cosgrove and Mark Hall, headquartered in Chorlton-cum-Hardy, Manchester. Cosgrove Hall was a major producer of children's television and animated programmes/films, which are still seen in over eighty countries. The company was wound down by its then owner, ITV plc, on 26 October 2009. It was mainly known for its series Danger Mouse, The Wind in the Willows and Count Duckula.

== History ==
=== Stop Frame Productions ===
Stop Frame Productions
- Founded: 1969
- Founder: Mark Hall
- Defunct: 1975
- Fate: Closed
- Successor: Cosgrove Hall Productions
- Owner: Brian Cosgrove; Mark Hall

Brian Cosgrove and Mark Hall first met while both were students at Manchester College of Art and Design, which is now part of Manchester Metropolitan University. They later became co-workers at Granada Television, where they produced television graphics.

Hall left his job in 1969 and founded his own production company, Stop Frame Productions. Cosgrove joined the company shortly after its establishment. Their first projects, for Stop Frame, included public service films and television commercials for such companies as the TVTimes. From 1971 to 1972, the company released the animated series, The Magic Ball, which they created in a renovated shed located in the yard of Cosgrove's father-in-law. Hall directed two animated productions for Stop Frame, Captain Noah and His Floating Zoo, which was released in 1972, and the television series, Noddy, which aired in 1975. The company also produced opening credits and graphics for children's TV series such as Rainbow in 1972.

Stop Frame Productions halted production, and was closed in 1975.

=== Cosgrove Hall Productions ===
Following the closure of Stop Frame Productions, Cosgrove and Hall found new work in animation, particularly due to their earlier work on the 1972 series Rainbow. The producer of Rainbow, Thames Television, an ITV franchisee, created a new subsidiary animation studio called Cosgrove Hall Productions in the following year, 1976. Thames hired and commissioned Cosgrove and Hall as lead animators to create new animated programmes, for this new studio, based on their earlier work with Rainbow. Another bit of Thames-commissioned work was the title sequence for the 1974 feature film The Best Of Benny Hill, produced for Thames Television and EMI Films. Thames Television also hired John Hambley as Cosgrove Hall Films' first executive producer. Its first series was Chorlton and the Wheelies, the lead role being named after the suburb of Manchester where the company was based (the other characters were placed on wheels as this made the stop-frame animation easier). The pop singer and musician Bernard Sumner worked for Cosgrove Hall from its founding until 1979 as a tracer.

Danger Mouse was one of the studio's earliest international successes. The studio made 161 episodes between 1981 and 1992. In each one, Danger Mouse, the world's greatest secret agent, and his well-meaning but useless sidekick, Penfold, outwit the evil Baron Silas Greenback and various scoundrels. In 1983, the studio made a 75-minute film, The Wind in the Willows, based on Kenneth Grahame's classic story of the same name. It won a BAFTA award and an international Emmy award. Subsequently, the studio made a 52-episode TV series based on the characters between 1984 and 1990. All the music and songs for the feature and series were written by Keith Hopwood, late of Herman's Hermits, and Malcolm Rowe. The Stone Roses guitarist John Squire worked on this series. Count Duckula was a spoof on the Dracula legend; its title character is the world's only vegetarian vampire. He aspires to be rich and famous. Originally, he was a villain/henchman recurring in the Danger Mouse series, but got his own spin-off series in 1988 that rapidly became one of Cosgrove Hall's most successful programmes, and a Cosgrove Hall staple to spin-off characters from each successive cartoon. Both shows also aired on Nickelodeon in the U.S. during the late 1980s, and were popular in the ratings for the channel. In 1989, the studio produced a full-length feature based on Roald Dahl's The BFG.

Truckers, the first book in The Bromeliad, was the studio's first collaboration with the best-selling author Terry Pratchett. The 1992 series follows the efforts of a group of nomes, whose spaceship crash-landed on Earth 15,000 years ago, to return home. However, Cosgrove Hall Productions' days became numbered as on 31 December 1992, their financial backer and owner, Thames Television lost its ITV franchise and began divesting/closing its subsidiaries. The studio downgraded its operations following Thames' loss of ITV franchise, and eventually closed doors in 1993.

=== Cosgrove Hall Films ===
On 15 November 1993, Anglia Television and HBO announced the re-opening of Cosgrove Hall Productions, albeit as Cosgrove Hall Films. The studio would be 75% owned by Anglia and HBO's joint-venture Anglia Television Entertainment, while Cosgrove and Hall would hold the remaining 25%, with Anglia/HBO's distribution arm ITEL holding international distribution to projects produced by the studio. Cosgrove Hall Films' first two projects were new episodes of both Avenger Penguins and Noddy's Toyland Adventures (both of which began airing prior to the sudden shutdown and reopening). Cosgrove Hall Films also acquired the rights to produce new series based on existing Cosgrove Hall properties. However, Thames would retain the pre-1993 programming catalogue. Nearer the end of the 1990's, ownership was placed under ITEL itself, with then-Anglia owners United News & Media purchasing HBO's stake in November 1999.

In 1997, Cosgrove Hall Films produced two series for Channel 4 based on Wyrd Sisters and Soul Music, two novels from Pratchett's Discworld series.

One of the studio's specialities was producing programmes for young children, such as Oakie Doke, Bill and Ben, and Andy Pandy for the BBC. The latter two series were based on classic characters from the 1950s. In the mid 2000s, Cosgrove Hall worked on a new version of Postman Pat. The studio also animated Ghosts of Albion, the BBC's first fully animated webcast. Website visitors could learn about the production and help to develop the story. Cosgrove Hall produced Scream of the Shalka, a Doctor Who animated story for the BBC website. In 2005, Cosgrove Hall, with Zinkia Entertainment and Granada Kids, produced the Spanish-British children's series, Pocoyo, making this their first ever CGI production. In 2006, they animated the missing first and fourth episodes of the Doctor Who serial The Invasion for a DVD release.

ITV started reducing its children's department in 2006 and towards the end of 2008 it began winding down the operations of Cosgrove Hall. All except six staff were made redundant by ITV, and Cosgrove Hall moved 'in house' to the Granada Television Studios in Manchester, ending over 30 years of the studio in Chorlton, with many ex staff moving to Chapman Entertainment. ITV said Cosgrove Hall currently had no work but believed “It is on the verge of a commission that will lead to the next recruitment drive.” However the UK was going through its deepest recession and ITV was not interested in investing in Cosgrove Hall. A financial review decided that the company was no longer viable.

The company was again put under review by ITV plc in October 2009, being absorbed, and ceasing to exist a few months later. Cosgrove Hall was developing Theodore, a CGI-animated series, when ITV absorbed the company. Despite being absorbed, the company is still classified as an "Active" business on Companieshouse.

=== Legacy ===
The land occupied by Cosgrove Hall's studios, in Albany Road, Chorlton, adjacent to the town's telephone exchange, which had stood empty for two years, was sold in the summer of 2010 to a housing development company. During 2012, the studios were demolished and 11 flats were built on the site.

Brian Cosgrove became the executive producer at CHF Entertainment, (defunct 2019), as was Hall until his death. On 18 November 2011, Cosgrove Hall Films closed down due to Mark Hall’s death of cancer at the age of 75.

== Filmography ==
=== Films and television specials ===
- The Best Of Benny Hill (Thames Television/Euston Films for EMI Films, Opening Titles, 1974)
- The Talking Parcel (40 minutes, 1978)
- Cinderella (40 minutes, 1979)
- The Pied Piper of Hamelin (30 minutes, 1981)
- The Wind in the Willows (79 minutes, 1983)
- The Reluctant Dragon (30 minutes, 1987)
- A Tale of Two Toads (60 minutes, 1989)
- The BFG (91 minutes, 1989)
- The Fool of the World and the Flying Ship (60 minutes, 1990)
- On Christmas Eve (30 minutes, 1992)
- Peter and the Wolf (45 minutes, 1995)
- Father Christmas and the Missing Reindeer (25 minutes, 1998)

=== Short subjects ===
- Ersatz (14 minutes, 1978)
- The Sandman (10 minutes, 1991)
- Welcome to the Discworld (8 minutes, 1996)
- Blink (2001) (short film)
- One Night (2001) (short film, directed by Brian Demoskoff)
- The Trojan Horse (2001) (short film) (followed by Tindersticks: Dying Slowly)
- BBC Children in Need - Small People (stop-motion segments for 1998 promo)
- Mr Scruff (music video) (co-production with Four23Films)

=== Television series ===
==== 1970s ====
- The Magic Ball (Granada for ITV, 1971-1972)
- Rainbow (Thames for ITV, 1972-1976) (animated sequences)
- Captain Noah and His Floating Zoo (Granada for ITV, 1972)
- Sally and Jake (Thames for ITV, 1973-1974, previously a segment in Rainbow 1972)
- Noddy (Thames for ITV, 1975)
- Chorlton and the Wheelies (Thames for ITV, 1976-1979)
- Jamie and the Magic Torch (Thames for ITV, 1976-1980)
- Grandma Bricks of Swallow Street (animation made for Rainbow) (1976-1977)
- The Kenny Everett Video Show (Thames for ITV, 1978-1981) (Captain Kremmen shorts)

==== 1980s ====
- Cockleshell Bay (Thames for ITV, 1980–1986)
- Danger Mouse (Thames for ITV, 1981-1992)
- The Wind in the Willows (Thames for ITV, 1984-1987)
- Alias the Jester (Thames for ITV, 1985-1986)
- Creepy Crawlies (ITV, 1987-1989)
- Count Duckula (Thames/Central for ITV, 1988-1993)

==== 1990s ====
- Oh, Mr. Toad (Thames for ITV, 1990)
- Victor & Hugo: Bunglers in Crime (Thames for ITV, 1991-1992)
- Truckers (Thames for ITV, 1992)
- Noddy's Toyland Adventures (Children's BBC, 1992-2000)
- Avenger Penguins (Granada/Anglia for ITV, 1993–1994)
- Opéra imaginaire (1993) ("Pêcheurs de perles" short)
- The Mutinearlys (Children's BBC, 1994-1996) (co-production with BBC Enterprises)
- Oakie Doke (Children's BBC, 1995-1996)
- Fantomcat (Anglia for ITV, 1995-1996)
- Sooty's Amazing Adventures (Meridian for ITV, 1996-1997)
- The Enchanted World of Brambly Hedge (episodes 1-4) (Children's BBC, 1997) (co-production with HIT Entertainment)
- Soul Music (Channel 4, 1997) (co-production with Carrington Productions International)
- Wyrd Sisters (Channel 4, 1997) (co-production with Carrington Productions International)
- Captain Star (HTV for ITV, 1997-1998) (co-production with Teletoon and Nickelodeon UK)
- Enid Blyton's Enchanted Lands (Children's BBC, 1997-1998) (Co-production with Abbey Home Entertainment and PolyGram Visual Programming)
- The Animal Shelf (Anglia for ITV, 1997–2000)
- Father Christmas and the Missing Reindeer (1997) (TV special) (co-production with Millimages)
- Rocky and the Dodos (Central for ITV, 1998-1999)
- Lavender Castle (HTV for CITV, 1999) (co-production with Carrington Productions International and Gerry Anderson Productions)
- Rotten Ralph (CBBC, 1999-2001) (co-production with Italtoons UK and Tooncan Enterprises Ltd)
- The Foxbusters (Anglia for CITV, 1999-2000) (co-production with United Productions)
- The Noddy Shop (PBS, 1999) (Series 2, additional Noddy animation in live-action scenes)
- Timekeepers of the Millennium (development for a series produced by The Foundation for ITV in association with NMEC, 1999)

==== 2000s ====
- The Tales of Little Grey Rabbit (HTV for CITV, 2000)
- Fetch the Vet (LWT for CITV, 2000-2001) (co-production with Flextech Television)
- Vampires, Pirates & Aliens (2000) (co-production with Millimages and France Animation)
- Bill and Ben (2001-2002, Co-production with Ben Productions LLC and BBC Worldwide)
- Andy Pandy (Remake, 2002, Co-production with Ben Productions LLC and BBC Worldwide)
- Engie Benjy (2002-2004, Co-production with Granada Kids)
- Albie (2002-2004, co-production with Granada Kids)
- Adventurers: Masters of Time (2002) (co-production with SBAF Berlin Animation Film GmbH)
- Little Robots (2003-2005) (co-production with Create TV and Film Limited)
- Shadow of the Elves (2003) (co-production with SBAF Berlin Animation Film GmbH)
- Postman Pat (Series 3-6, 2003–2008) (co-production with Entertainment Rights)
- The Oddkinsons - A United Family (2003) (co-production with Manchester United Ltd)
- Ghosts of Albion (BBCi, 2003) (webcast)
- Sixty Second Lovestory (2003) (short film, directed by Brian Demoskoff)
- Cosmorados (2003) (co-production with BBC Three's Animation Unit and BBC Talent)
- Sorted (2004) (3 minute animated fill-ins made for the show, produced by Libra Television for Discovery Kids)
- Pocoyo (Series 1, 2005) (co-production with Zinkia Entertainment and Granada Kids)
- Blue Dog Blues (2005) (short film)
- Fifi and the Flowertots (Series 1-2, 2005-2007, Nick Jr. and Milkshake!) (co-production with Chapman Entertainment)
- Kid Clones (2005) (co-production with Toon Factory and Agogo Media)
- The Likeaballs (CBBC, 2006) (produced by Cosgrove House and Animated Adventures & Pictures)
- Rupert Bear, Follow the Magic... (Milkshake!, 2006-2008) (co-production with Entertainment Rights and Express Newspapers)
- Roary the Racing Car (Series 1, 2008, Nick Jr. and Milkshake!) (co-production with Chapman Entertainment)
- Eddie Retractorhead (Nickelodeon, 2008)
- Rocket Boy and Toro (CBBC, 2008)
- Postman Pat: Special Delivery Service (2008, series 1) (co-production with Entertainment Rights)

=== Pilots ===
- SuperTed (not to be confused with Mike Young's character of the same name) (1975)
- Thomas the Tank Engine (1976) (co-produced with Andrew Lloyd Webber)
- Trash (Nickelodeon, 1990)
- The Crowville Chronicles (Nickelodeon, 1990)
- The Mutinearlies (1993) (co-production with BBC Enterprises Ltd)
- Mungie (1996) (co-production with BBC Animation Unit)
- The Story of Odysseus (1996) (co-production with Carrington Productions International)
- The Foxbusters (1997)
- The Wot-a-Lots (later known as The Beeps) (directed by Sarah Ball) (1997)
- Meet the Frankensteins (1998)
- The Little Grey Men (written by Steve Walker) (1998)
- Winnie the Pooh (1999) (pilot for a stop-motion direct-to-video version of the popular Disney adaption by Bridget Appleby)
- Eloise (2000) (co-production with The itsy bitsy Entertainment Company and Cartoon Saloon)
- Mouth and Trousers (2000)
- The Thwarting of Baron Bolligrew (2001)
- Porter and Daughter (2001) (Engie Benjy pilot, co-production with ITEL)
- Junglekids (2001)
- F1: Race for the Future (2001)
- Saturday Night Livestock (2001)
- The Inbreds (2002) (pilot for adult animated series, once launched an official website)
- The Kittens (2002) (Failed pilot for an Atomic Kitten animated series)
- Shelltown (2003)
- CodeWarriors (2004) (co-produced with Granada)
- The Wumblers: Bertrum's Color Day (2004) (co-production with Peak Entertainment and The Silly Goose Company)
- The Rag Pack (2004) (co-production with VGI Entertainment)
- The Slums (2004) (co-production with Streetplay Design Ltd)
- Super Hero High (2004)
- Harold's Planet (2004)
- Beat Freaks (2004) (co-production with Spin Entertainment and Mainframe Entertainment)
- Octopus and Worm (2005)
- The Carrotty Kid (2005) (once launched an official website)
- Wobbly Horse (2005)
- The Mystics (2005)
- The Boy Who Kicked Pigs (2005)
- Hamster in a Cage (2006)
- A Break From The Old Routine (2007) (co-production with S4C)
- My Neighbour is an Evil Genius (2007)
- Roger to the Rescue (2007)
- The Princess Bumblees (2007)
- Squidge and the Hardnuts (2008)
- Ruby to the Rescue (CBeebies, 2009)
- Theodore (2010) (was about to be developed for ITV during their absorption with the company)

=== Other ===
- I Love 1981 (2001) (Danger Mouse's interview animation for BBC documentary)
- The Oddkinsons - A United Family (2003) (webcast, co-production with Manchester United)
- Doctor Who (2003 - 2007) (Scream of the Shalka webcast, an animated reconstruction of The Invasion and the televised serial The Infinite Quest)
- Ghosts of Albion (BBCi, 2003) (Legacy webcast)
- Sorted (2004) (3-minute animated fill-ins for Libra Television and Discovery Kids UK)
- Love on a Saturday Night (2004) (additional animated fill-in graphics for LWT)
- Top 10 Conspiracy Theories (2004) (animated graphics for Liberty Bell and Channel 5)
