= Mark Hall (animator) =

British producer and writer (1936–2011)

- Born: 17 May 1936 Wakefield, West Yorkshire, England
- Died: 18 November 2011 (aged 75) Manchester, England
- Occupation: Producer, animator
- Years active: 1966–2011
- Spouse: Margaret Routledge (m. 1961)
- Children: 2

Mark William Hall (17 May 1936 – 18 November 2011) was a British producer and animator who co-founded Cosgrove Hall Productions and CHF Entertainment, with Brian Cosgrove. Together, they created multiple animated series, including Danger Mouse and Count Duckula.

Hall died of cancer in 2011, leaving his role in CHF Entertainment to his son Simon.
