= Plod =

Plod may refer to:

- a slang term for a policeman
- Mr. Plod, a fictional policeman in the Noddy stories written by Enid Blyton
- Postman Plod, a fictional character from the British adult spoof comic magazine Viz
