= Jonathan Kydd (actor) =

British actor and narrator

- Born: 1956 (age 69–70); London, England
- Occupations: Actor, voice-over artist, narrator, writer, producer and podcaster
- Years active: 1962–present
- Parents: Sam Kydd (father); Pinkie Barnes (mother)

Jonathan Kydd is a British actor, voice-over artist, narrator, writer, producer and podcaster. He has appeared on many television shows and has also worked as a voice actor, voicing video games, advertisements, documentaries and cartoons and being a regular in comedy episodes for BBC Radio 4. He is the son of the late actor Sam Kydd.

== Career ==
Kydd's first acting role was in the 1962 British comedy film The Iron Maiden, in which he appeared aged 6 with his father. He also appeared in numerous radio and television series including Pipkins, Chambers, Dial M For Pizza, Flying the Flag, The Quest, Jonathan Creek, Trial and Retribution, The Castle, The Attractive Young Rabbi and Cabin Pressure, as well as a 1989 AA commercial as a man who had his car buried in the sand, which ran for four years.

Kydd wrote 23 comedy songs for the comedian Brian Conley when he was appearing in his Saturday evening show in the early 1990s, one of which was on the 1994 Royal Variety Show. Kydd has written four musicals, one of which, Hey Get a Life, was on at the St Andrews Lane Theatre in Dublin in 2000 which he also directed. His musical The Hard Boiled Egg and the Wasp, about the Victorian comedian Dan Leno, was on at the Lion and Unicorn Theatre in 2012. His later musical, written like the previous one with Andy Street, was Doodle the Musical, which was on at Waterloo East; his father Sam Kydd was in it as a character. He appeared on Talking Pictures TV, discussing his father on "Sam Kydd day" when the channel showed nine of the 290 films made by his father between 1945 and 1982.

Kydd has acted in many sitcoms, including One Foot in the Grave and three series of Smith and Jones as one of the "pals". His 2007 short film Ahaarrrr appeared at seventeen international film festivals, winning several awards.

Starting in 1986, Kydd has voiced over 12,000 adverts, promos, documentaries, corporate videos, and CD-ROM games, and dubbed many films and TV programmes. He provided voices for various animated programmes and films, including Bangers and Mash, the Lenny the Letter educational videos produced by Royal Mail, Astro Farm, The Beano Video, The Beano Videostars, Asterix Conquers America, the first series of Bimble's Bucket, The Adventures of Paddington Bear (as Paddington Bear), Hilltop Hospital, Warren United, Toy Story That Time Forgot, two series of Mr. Bean: The Animated Series, and Noddy, Toyland Detective (as Big Ears, Fuse, Scurvy, the Ninjas and the Dim Knight). He also lent his voice to an animated pilot called Knots in the Wood, which was never released. Kydd was the voice for L'Oreal adverts in the early 2000s and the cult Ferrero Rocher Ambassador's Reception television advertisement. He is a regular voice for Film4, and voices many wildlife documentaries.

Kydd's first video game role was Edmund Lucy Fentible, the DoorBot in the 1998 video game Starship Titanic. He also provided voices for other games, such as Call of Duty, Fable, Demon's Souls, Crysis, Heavenly Sword, Bliztkrieg, Dragon Quest Swords, Hellgate: London, Dark Seer, Lego The Hobbit, Star Wars: The Old Republic, Assassin's Creed Syndicate, Assassin's Creed Unity, Age of Conan, Medieval II: Total War, Headhunter, and the 2001–2011 game adaptations of the Harry Potter films (as Rubeus Hagrid, Peeves, the Erklings, the Portraits, the Death Eaters, and others).

Kydd writes and provides vocals with comedy band The Rudy Vees, having been in The Amazing Singing Dentists, The Bay Citee Molars and The Kondos, who appeared on the finals of New Faces in 1988, and played in his own band Jonny Kydd, for whom he recorded a song for the Chelsea F.C. called "Chelsea Blue". His album Eggshell Heart was released in 2005, followed by his Bay Citee Molars album Dentura Highway in 2009. His Rudy Vees album The Fists of Harmonious Righteousness has three videos recorded from it: "King of Thongs", "My Baby's Possibly a Vampire" and "Dance Like My Dad". In 2019, Kydd released two tracks with music videos; "Posh", a 1930s grime track described as "a bizarrely brilliant work of art", and "Order (Song for John Bercow) (Hp Sauce Dance Mix)", an electro dance track singing the praises of the Speaker of the House of Commons, John Bercow. Each week he discusses football on the Chelsea FanCast podcast, and does the two-minute Chelsea Fanbite.

Kydd has provided narration for a number of railway-related programmes produced by Video 125, as well as the ITV London fly-on-the-wall documentary The Tube. In 2021, He was an executive producer on the horror film Lair. In 2022, he published the first volume of his father's memoirs Be a Good Boy, Sam 1945–52.

== Personal life ==
His mother, Pinkie Barnes, was one of England's first female advertising copywriters, and also played table tennis eleven times for England.

== Appearances ==
- The Iron Maiden (1962) – Fred's Son
- Pipkins – Tom (70 episodes)
- One Foot in the Grave – Stall Holder and Chippy Joe
- Jonathan Creek – Mickey Daniels
- Holby City
- Doctors
- Sam Kydd edition of This Is Your Life
- Ahaarrrr (2007) – Kevin, Producer
- The Castle (BBC Radio 4) – Thomas, Cardinal Duncan

== Voices ==
- Round the Bend! (1989–1991) – Luschetti Bruschetti, additional voices
- Bangers and Mash (1989) – Narrator, Bangers, Mash, Mum, Dad, Grandma, Mick, Petal, Mrs. Chum, Mrs. Snitchnose, additional voices
- Lenny the Letter: Lenny's First Journey (1989) – Arthur the Letter, Letters, Postman, Special Delivery Letter (remake)
- Dragons, Giants and Witches (1990) – Narrator, additional voices
- Honey Nut Loops (1990–1995) – Loopy
- Lenny the Letter: Lenny Goes by Air (1991) – London Flyer, Bag, Security Checker
- Astro Farm (1992–1996) – Sam Foxwood, Dinko, Splodger, additional voices
- Lenny the Letter: Lenny Goes to the Country (1993) – Smithy the Jiffy Bag, Percy the Prescription
- The Beano Video (1993) – Dennis' Dad, Walter the Softy, Spotty Perkins, Bertie Blenkinsop, Parrot, Flea #1, Fred, Doctor, Neighbour, Pink Glove, Father, Monkey, Minnie's Dad, Panting Dogs, Chair Store Man, Frog, Policeman #1, Pilot, Bully, Man on Bench, Tailcoat #2, Policeman #2, Sergeant, Policemen, Plug, Smiffy, Spotty (Space Case), Teacher, Headmaster, Posh Street Kids, Professor Quaver, School Doctor, Keeper of Lake Beautiful, Rubbish Collector, Professor Molaroid, Picnic Boy #1, Narrators #1, #3–10
- Teddy Trucks (1994) – Boss Bear, Wilson, Jacko, Gerry, Nutley, Governor Bear, Mr. Bizwhiz, Workman, Ballet Director, Ballet Dancers, additional voices
- The Beano Videostars (1994) – Walter the Softy (The Snowman Army, Dad commercial and Party Sounds from Beano Town commercial), Colonel, Dennis' Teacher, Minnie's Dad, Minnie's Dad's Boss, Sidney, Teacher, Headmaster, School Inspector, Horse Race Announcer, Penguin, Monkey #1, Ivy's Dad, Monkey #2, Park Keeper #3, Poolgoer #5, Police Officer #2, Presenter
- Access (1990s) – Access
- Asterix Conquers America (1994) – Unhygenix, Centurion Voluptuous Arteriosclerosus, Parrot (Original version)
- Bimble's Bucket (1996) – Mudge, Mr. Gallypot
- Dennis and Gnasher (1996) – J, Muffin Man
- Romuald the Reindeer (1996) – Harold Haroldson, Kirk, additional voices
- The Adventures of Paddington Bear (1997–2000) – Paddington Bear
- Hilltop Hospital (1999–2003) – Arthur, Danny Lion, Jersey Sharphorn, News Reporter, additional voices
- Maths Challenge: TV Workout Year 6 (2003) – Matt Matics, Dr. Strangeglove, Bear, Narrator, additional voices
- This is a Lovely Sausage (2006) – Sausage
- Flushed Away (2006) – Barnacle
- Warren United (2014) – Burger Al, Trevor the Horse, Scientist, additional voices
- Toy Story That Time Forgot (2014) – Ray-Gon
- Mr. Bean: The Animated Series (2015–2025) – Small Boy, Ice Cream Man, Bird Watcher, Clapperboard Man, Old Man, additional voices
- Noddy, Toyland Detective (2016–2020) – Big Ears, Fuse, Scurvy, Ninjas, Dim Knight

== Trailer voiceovers ==
- VCI – Children's Videos promotions (1996–1997)
- Boomerang – The Tom and Jerry Show promotion (2014)

== Video narrations ==
- Kent Coast
- East Coastway and Marshlink
- Isle Of Wight
- Cotswolds & Malverns Line by First Great Western
- Exeter to Basingstoke by South West Trains
- Eurostar Brussels to London St Pancras
- Strasbourg to Paris by TGV
- Turin to Chambéry by TGV
- Steam Spectacular
- The Old Gotthard Tunnel Route
- The Darjeeling Himalayan Railway part two
- Signal Box Archive
- The Darjeeling Himalayan Railway part one
- Kolkata Tram

== Documentaries ==
- The Tube
- The Russian Revolution (2017)
- JFK: The Making of a President (2017)
- Diana's Dresses
- Shark Attack
- Airport Security
- History of the Soviet Union
- One Born Every Minute
- The Cruise
- Africa's Deadliest
- Hitler's Games
- Raiders of the Lost Art
- Doing Hard Time
- Shark Attack Files
- World War Two Origins
- Shark v Tuna
- Shark v Whale
- Titanic
- Wills
- Caravaggio: Man & Mystery (2012)

== Video games ==
- Starship Titanic (1998) – Edmund Lucy Fentible, the DoorBot
- Harry Potter and the Philosopher's Stone (2001) – Rubeus Hagrid, Peeves, Eyelops Owl Emporium Owner
- Headhunter (2001) – Additional voices
- Paddington: The World Mystery Tour (2002) – Paddington Bear
- Smash Court Tennis Pro Tournament (2002) – Additional voices
- Harry Potter and the Chamber of Secrets (2002) – Rubeus Hagrid
- Hidden & Dangerous 2 (2003) – Additional voices
- Blitzkrieg (2003) – Additional voices
- Ghosthunter (2003) – Detonator, Officers, Delta Team Leader
- Harry Potter and the Prisoner of Azkaban (2004) – Rubeus Hagrid, Peeves
- Headhunter: Redemption (2004) – Additional voices
- Fable (2004) – Bandits, Bodyguard, Pirate Ghost
- Fable: The Lost Chapters (2005) – Bandits, Bodyguard, Pirate Ghost
- Harry Potter and the Goblet of Fire (2005) – Erkling, Ministry Wizard #1
- Dragon Quest VIII (2005) – Additional voices (English version)
- Medieval II: Total War (2006) – Additional voices
- Harry Potter and the Order of the Phoenix (2007) – Rubeus Hagrid, Barking Mad Male Gargoyle, GCR Portrait #4, Termeritus Shanks, Gryffindor Man
- Heavenly Sword (2007) – Additional voices
- The Settlers: Rise of an Empire (2007) – Additional voices (English version)
- Hellgate: London (2007) – Additional voices
- Crysis (2007) – Suit Voice
- Smarty Pants (2007) – Narrator
- Dragon Quest Swords (2008) – Aruval, Masked Announcer, Soldier (English version)
- Viking: Battle for Asgard (2008) – Additional voices
- Age of Conan: Unchained (2008) – Additional voices
- Crysis Warhead (2008) – Suit Voice
- Fable II (2008) – Additional voices
- Demon's Souls (2009) – Scirvir the Wanderer
- Harry Potter and the Half-Blood Prince (2009) – Rubeus Hagrid, Basil Fronsac, Termeritus Shanks
- Kinect Sports – Additional voices
- Harry Potter and the Deathly Hallows – Part 1 (2010) – Muggle Males, Death Eaters
- Harry Potter and the Deathly Hallows – Part 2 (2010) – Additional voices
- Star Wars: The Old Republic (2011) – Horak-Mul, Ivory, Captain Garrett
- Lego The Hobbit (2014) – Troll, additional voices
- Assassin's Creed Unity (2014) – Chronicler
- Assassin's Creed Syndicate (2015) – Additional voices
- Assassin's Creed Syndicate: Jack the Ripper (2015) – London Civilian
- Dark Seer (2016)
- World of Warcraft: Battle for Azeroth (2018) – Additional voices
- Demon's Souls (2020) – Freke's Apprentice, Scirvir, the Wanderer
- Project D (2023) – Dimitry
- Dragon Age: The Veilguard (2024) – Additional voices
- Final Fantasy Tactics: The Ivalice Chronicles (2025) – Merchant (English version)
- Monkey Says as Monkey Do
- Winnie the Pooh Hasbro Playskool
- Hasbro Monopoly City Break 2
- Playskool Preschool Toy Range
- Noodle Hasbro
- Monster Mutt
- Battlefield
- Killzone
- SOCOM U.S. Navy SEALs
- Cluedo – Butler
