= Noddy's Toyland Adventures =

- Genre: Stop-motion; Children's
- Based on: The Noddy stories by Enid Blyton
- Written by: Julia Allen Chris Allen
- Directed by: Brian Little; Jackie Cockle; Chris Taylor
- Voices of: Susan Sheridan; Jimmy Hibbert
- Narrated by: Jimmy Hibbert; Katie Boland (North America)
- Theme music composer: Paul K. Joyce
- Composers: Paul K. Joyce; Stacey Hersh
- Country of origin: United Kingdom
- Original language: English
- No. of seasons: 4
- No. of episodes: 53 (including Christmas special)

Production
- Executive producers: Theresa Plummer-Andrews; Brian Cosgrove; Mark Hall; Rick Siggelkow (North America)
- Producers: Brian Cosgrove; Mark Hall; Jackie Cockle; Chris Bowden
- Editors: Zyggy Markiewicz; Jane Hicks; Nibs Senior
- Running time: 10 minutes
- Production companies: Cosgrove Hall Productions (Series 1 and 2); Cosgrove Hall Films (Series 3 and 4); BBC Enterprises/BBC Worldwide; Enid Blyton Ltd.

Original release
- Network: BBC1 and BBC2 (Children's BBC)
- Release: 17 September 1992 – 28 March 2000

Related
- Noddy (1998); Make Way for Noddy (2002)

Noddy's Toyland Adventures is a British children's television programme that was broadcast from September 1992 until April 1994 and December 1994 (and reran in 2000 on the Children's BBC block of the BBC). It is based on the character Noddy, created by English children's author Enid Blyton.

The show stars the voices of Susan Sheridan and Jimmy Hibbert. Each episode was written by Julia and Chris Allen respectively during its broadcast run. Paul K. Joyce composed the show's opening theme.

In North America, episodes were broadcast as part of a full thirty-minute program titled Noddy. The program featured the original UK animations re-dubbed with North American voices (broadcast in between all new live action segments), while Paul K. Joyce's soundtrack was replaced by a new score by Stacey Hersh, who also scored the live action part of the series. Nashville-based songwriter Dennis Scott composed 99 new songs for the live action segments, including the show's opening theme.

Universal released several of the re-dubbed Noddy animations on VHS (through USA Home Entertainment and PolyGram Video). These videos also featured songs written by Stacey Hersh and co-writer Ari Posner. This new series aired in the UK in 1999, under the title Noddy in Toyland (unrelated to the 2009 series of the same name); the original British soundtrack was used - however the live action segments were unaltered for original cut.

== Premise ==
The show follows the adventures of Noddy, a little wooden doll who lives in Toyland with his red and yellow car, often trying to make sixpence or getting himself in trouble. Along with his best friends (Big Ears, Mr. Plod and Tessie Bear), they are always ready to lend a hand, especially when he gets tricked by Gobbo and Sly, the wicked Goblins. Each episode mostly ends with Noddy laughing and nodding his head (likely ringing the bell on his hat in the end).

== Characters ==
=== Major ===
- Noddy (voiced by Susan Sheridan in the original, and Catherine Disher in the American/Canadian dub) is the protagonist of the series. Noddy is an imaginative young wooden boy who lives in Toyland.
- Big Ears (voiced by Jimmy Hibbert in the original, and Benedict Campbell in the American/Canadian dub) is a wise, bearded male brownie who lives in a toadstool house in Toadstool Woods and is Noddy's best friend and mentor. He serves as a father figure to Noddy, and is the one Noddy usually goes to for advice and support. If Noddy has problems, Big Ears is always happy to help with his astute knowledge and sense-of-humour.
- PC Plod (voiced by Jimmy Hibbert in the original, and Benedict Campbell in the American/Canadian dub) is the Toytown policeman. Mr. Plod is quite committed to upholding the law, and thinks Toytown cannot live without him. PC Plod has a British accent in both the original and American dubbed versions, but in the UK version, Mr. Plod speaks with a West Country accent. He uses the following catchphrase: "Stop, in the name of the law".
- Tessie Bear (voiced by Susan Sheridan in the original, and Karen Bernstein in the American/Canadian dub), is a neutral and clever young female teddy bear, who is happy trying new things. In the original version, she speaks with an Irish accent.
- Dinah Doll (voiced by Susan Sheridan in the original, and Sharon Lee Williams in the American/Canadian dub) is a kind female china doll, who sells all kinds of everything in the market. Dinah plays an older sibling figure role to both Noddy and Tessie, and the three are always ready to help each other out when a problem arises.
- Bumpy Dog (vocal effects performed by Jimmy Hibbert in both the original and American/Canadian dub) is Noddy's constant companion and Tessie's pet dog. Bumpy is highly excitable and will rush at friends, but is loyal, and has sensitive feelings if scolded by Noddy or anyone else.
- Sly (voiced by Susan Sheridan in the original, and Catherine Disher in the American/Canadian dub) and Gobbo (voiced by Jimmy Hibbert in the original, and James Rankin in the American/Canadian dub) are the main antagonists of the series. They are goblins who are very mischievous and greedy, and always play horrible tricks on Noddy. Ironically, Gobbo is the more conniving and intelligent one.
- Noddy's Car (voiced by Jimmy Hibbert in both the original and American/Canadian dub) is the yellow car with red decals which Noddy drives; it parps its horn and sways on its chassis to indicate emotion.

=== Recurring ===
- Mr. Wobbly Man (voiced by Jimmy Hibbert in the original, and Michael Stark in the American dub) is a male roly-poly toy who is very diligent about things.
- Master Tubby Bear (voiced by Jimmy Hibbert in the original, and Catherine Disher in the American/Canadian dub) is Mr. and Mrs. Tubby Bear's son who is sometimes naughty and mischievous. As a mummy's boy sort of character, Master Tubby gets easily jealous whenever Noddy receives more attention from his parents than him.
- Clockwork Mouse (voiced by Susan Sheridan in the original, and Michael Stark in the American/Canadian dub) is a toy mouse who often requires winding up. Clockwork is perky and often gets into scrapes as a result from Noddy's misadventures, but the two are generally good friends.
- Mr. Sparks (voiced by Jimmy Hibbert in the original, and Michael Stark in the American/Canadian dub) is Toyland's handyman with a Scottish accent, who has a street-smart personality and can mend anything.
- Miss Pink Cat (voiced by Susan Sheridan in the original, and Lynne Griffin in the American/Canadian dub) is a French/Southern 'young adult' female cat who is fussy and neat and has no patience for foolishness, even her own.
- Mr. Jumbo (voiced by Jimmy Hibbert in the original, and Michael Stark in the American/Canadian dub) is a mild-mannered male elephant who is friends with Clockwork Mouse.
- The Skittles are a family of three bowling pins consisting of Mrs. Sally Skittle and her many children of various sizes. They like being knocked down.
- Martha Monkey (voiced by Susan Sheridan in the original, and Lynne Griffin in the American/Canadian dub) is a young mischievous monkey girl who is very silly and bossy and is always making rude remarks. She has a similar older sibling figure position to Noddy with Dinah Doll, but is considerably more careless.
- Clockwork Clown (voiced by Jimmy Hibbert in the original, and Benedict Campbell in the American/Canadian dub) is an Italian toy clown who does amazing tricks.
- Mr. Train Driver (voiced by Jimmy Hibbert in the original, and Michael Stark in the American/Canadian dub) is a train driver who drives the Toyland Express train.

=== Minor ===
- Mr. Tubby Bear (voiced by Jimmy Hibbert in the original, and Benedict Campbell in the American/Canadian dub) is Noddy's next-door neighbour. His first name is John.
- Mrs. Tubby Bear (voiced by Susan Sheridan in the original, and Fiona Reid in the American/Canadian dub) is Noddy's next-door neighbour. Her first name is Fiona. It is clear that she, like Mr. Tubby Bear, are the superiors of Noddy, as Noddy always refers to them as "Mr. and Mrs. Tubby Bear" and they regard Noddy like another son, helping him grow in confidence.
- Mr. Milko (voiced by Jimmy Hibbert in the original, and Michael Stark in the American/Canadian dub) is Toyland's local milkman. Milko sometimes can be gloomy and sad, but Noddy's bell on his hat always cheers him up.
- Sammy Sailor (voiced by Jimmy Hibbert in the original, and Michael Stark in the American/Canadian dub) is the local Scottish harbour sailor.
- Bert Monkey (voiced by Jimmy Hibbert in the original, and Michael Stark in the American/Canadian dub) is a youngish monkey with a tail that is very naughty and has a mind of its own, often stealing objects all by itself. While it's heavily implied that this character is the same character as Bunkey, this is never confirmed within the series.
- Mr. Noah (voiced by Jimmy Hibbert in the original, and Michael Stark in the American dub) lives on the ark with Mrs. Noah and the animals, obviously based on the bible story.
- Mrs. Noah (voiced by Susan Sheridan in the original, and Fiona Reid in the American/Canadian dub) lives on the ark with Mr. Noah and the animals.
- Mr. Straw (voiced by Jimmy Hibbert in the original, and Michael Stark in the American/Canadian dub) lives on the farm with Mrs. Straw and the farm animals.
- Mrs. Straw (voiced by Susan Sheridan in the original, and Fiona Reid in the American/Canadian dub) lives on the farm with Mr. Straw and the farm animals.
- Lord Giraffe (voiced by Jimmy Hibbert in both the original and American/Canadian dub) lives on the ark with Mr. and Mrs. Noah and the other animals.
- Lady Giraffe (voiced by Susan Sheridan in both the original and American/Canadian dub) lives on the ark with Mr. and Mrs. Noah and the other animals.

== Episodes ==
Please note; only a few episodes had their titles Americanised. This was for a US video release. The rest were left unchanged.

=== Series 1 (1992) ===
| No. | UK title (top) US title (bottom) | Original release date |
|---|---|---|
| 1 | "Noddy Loses Sixpence" | 17 September 1992 |
| 1 | "Noddy Loses Some Money" | 17 September 1992 |
Everyone's losing things in Toytown today. Mr. Milko has lost his watch, Dinah Doll has lost her new bag and now Miss Pink Cat has lost her tail!
| 2 | "Noddy and the Goblins" | 24 September 1992 |
Sly and Gobbo the Goblins have tricked Noddy out of his car and stolen his hat. Can Mr. Plod and Bumpy Dog help him find them again?
| 3 | "Noddy and the Naughty Tail" | 1 October 1992 |
Bert Monkey has sold his pencil box, but Bert's forgotten that his magic rubber, which rubs out everything it touches, is inside! Now it's fallen into the hands of Master Tubby Bear - can Noddy reach him before he rubs out the Tubby Bears' house?
| 4 | "Noddy and the Pouring Rain" | 8 October 1992 |
It's raining in Toyland and Noddy's passengers are getting wet. But Big Ears has an idea - Noddy can drive while holding his old umbrella.
| 5 | "Noddy and Martha Monkey" | 15 October 1992 |
Noddy's car has hiccups and it can't be moved thanks to the mischief of Master Tubby Bear. What will Noddy do?
| 6 | "Noddy and the Kite" | 22 October 1992 |
It's a windy day in Toytown, and Noddy is very excited because this means Noddy can go and fly his kite with Tessie Bear. But then it starts to rain milk and eggs.
| 7 | "Noddy's New Friend" | 29 October 1992 |
| 7 | "Noddy Makes a New Friend" | 29 October 1992 |
Noddy is feeling bored, until Noddy bumps into a Bunkey - half a monkey and half a bunny. Bunkey's escaped from the circus and wants to move in with Noddy. But that's when the trouble begins...
| 8 | "Noddy and His Bell" | 5 November 1992 |
There's a burglar on the loose in Toytown. The only clue to his identity is the jingling sound Noddy makes, so everyone thinks it's Noddy. Can Noddy and Tessie Bear catch the real thief?
| 9 | "Noddy and the Milkman" | 12 November 1992 |
Noddy offers to do Mr. Milko's milk round for him, but Milko's also supposed to be looking after Bumpy Dog, and Noddy may have taken on more than Noddy can handle.
| 10 | "Noddy Gets a New Job" | 19 November 1992 |
While Mr. Plod recovers from an accident, Big Ears and Noddy are left in charge of keeping law and order in Toytown.
| 11 | "Noddy and the Broken Bicycle" | 26 November 1992 |
Big Ears has an accident on his bicycle, and all that can be saved is the bell.
| 12 | "Noddy and the Special Key" | 3 December 1992 |
It's a hot day in Toyland, and it appears that only Noddy is having to do any work. But while Noddy's friends are at the seaside, Noddy manages to solve the mystery behind Clockwork Mouse's new key.
| 13 | "Noddy Delivers Some Parcels" | 10 December 1992 |
| 13 | "Noddy Gives a Birthday Party" | 10 December 1992 |
Noddy is very busy because it's Big Ears' birthday. Noddy's decided to bake a cake for the first time and buy a cocoa mug with toadstools on from Dinah Doll's stall. But has Noddy left it all too late?

=== Series 2 (1993) ===
| No. overall | No. in series | UK title (top) US title (bottom) | Original release date |
|---|---|---|---|
| 14 | 1 | "Noddy and the Missing Hats" | 5 April 1994 |
| 14 | 1 | "Noddy Listens and Learns" | 5 April 1994 |
Noddy is rushing to pick up Tessie Bear from Sally Skittle's house, but he's late. To add to that, his car is making a strange noise and the Goblins are out and about making mischief. And just whose hat is he wearing?
| 15 | 2 | "Noddy and the Useful Rope" | 12 April 1994 |
When Mr. Tubby Bear gives Noddy a piece of rope, little does he know how useful it will be to Mr. Jumbo, Dinah Doll and Mr. Wobbly Man.
| 16 | 3 | "Noddy Loses His Bell" | 19 April 1994 |
Miss Pink Cat needs to talk to Noddy urgently, but he is nowhere to be found. Perhaps Bumpy Dog can help.
| 17 | 4 | "Noddy Cheers Up Big Ears" | 26 April 1994 |
Big Ears is really fed up because his bicycle has a burst tyre. Noddy promises to cheer him up with a surprise, but what can he think of?
| 18 | 5 | "Noddy Goes Shopping" | 3 May 1994 |
Noddy feels very sorry for Big Ears when he catches a cold, so he goes into town to do his shopping for him. But when he gets to the market, he can't remember what he's supposed to buy.
| 19 | 6 | "Noddy Borrows an Umbrella" | 10 May 1994 |
It's raining in Toyland, and Noddy's forgotten his umbrella. Big Ears lends Noddy his, but makes him promise not to lose it. Noddy tries hard not to lose it, but it's not as easy as it seems.
| 20 | 7 | "Noddy Meets Some Silly Hens" | 17 May 1994 |
Noddy has to take Farmer Straw's hens to market because Farmer Straw's horse has hurt its leg. It seems like an easy job, but when he picks them up, the hens just won't behave.
| 21 | 8 | "Noddy Lends a Hand" | 24 May 1994 |
Noddy's car is in the garage, so he can't run any errands. Luckily, Mrs. Tubby Bear needs some help collecting her shopping. Noddy is keen to help out, but it seems he's having a lot of trouble trying to carry things.
| 22 | 9 | "Noddy Finds a Furry Tail" | 31 May 1994 |
| 22 | 9 | "Noddy Gets Blamed" | 31 May 1994 |
Noddy finds a furry tail on the seat of his car, and Mr. Plod instructs him to take it back to the owner immediately. But Noddy's given so many passengers a ride today that he doesn't know who it belongs to.
| 23 | 10 | "Noddy Sets a Trap" | 7 June 1994 |
Noddy comes up with a plan to catch whoever has been taking his car at night - he and Big Ears are going to dress up as post boxes.
| 24 | 11 | "Noddy and the Magic Night" | 14 June 1994 |
When Noddy gives Tessie Bear a lift home from Mrs. Noah's party, they both embark on a magical midnight adventure.
| 25 | 12 | "Noddy to the Rescue" | 21 June 1994 |
First Master Tubby Bear goes missing, then Mr. Sparks' fire engine disappears. Can Noddy, Big Ears, Mr. Plod and Mr. Sparks track them both down?
| 26 | 13 | "Noddy Has a Bad Day" | 28 June 1994 |
Noddy is very busy, as he has to run errands for Dinah Doll, Miss Pink Cat and Mrs. Noah. If everything goes to plan, he can do them just in time.

=== Series 3 (1994) ===
| No. overall | No. in series | UK title (top) US title (bottom) | Original release date |
|---|---|---|---|
| 27 | 1 | "Noddy and the Fishing Rod" | 28 September 1994 |
Noddy enters the Toyland fishing contest and catches more than anybody expected.
| 28 | 2 | "Noddy and the Warm Scarf" | 5 October 1994 |
It's a chilly day in Toyland, and Tessie Bear has made Noddy, Lord Giraffe and Lady Giraffe a warm scarf. But Lord and Lady Giraffe refuse to wear the scarfs, and just who is responsible for the mysterious happenings around Toyland?
| 29 | 3 | "Noddy the Champion" | 12 October 1994 |
It's the annual Sports Day in Toyland, and Noddy and his friends are practising for the events. Thanks to Big Ears' coaching, Noddy is ready to enter the events, but who will turn out to be the real champion?
| 30 | 4 | "Noddy and the Golden Tree" | 19 October 1994 |
On Midsummer's Day, Noddy, Big Ears and Tessie Bear have a picnic. But while they're asleep, the Goblins put a Changeabout spell on Noddy's car. Midsummer's Night then brings magic, mystery and, with the Goblins involved, mischief.
| 31 | 5 | "Noddy and His Unhappy Car" | 26 October 1994 |
With flat tyres, a runaway car and many errands to run, Noddy is having a troublesome day. His car isn't happy, and Noddy must find out why.
| 32 | 6 | "Noddy Has an Afternoon Off" | 2 November 1994 |
Noddy's afternoon off is quickly turning into an awful muddle, as he's racing around Toyland doing favours for all his friends. Soon, Noddy gets very mixed up and can't remember who asked for what!
| 33 | 7 | "Noddy the Magician" | 9 November 1994 |
Noddy is trying out his new bag of magic spells, but Bumpy Dog keeps knocking them out of his hand. Soon Bumpy is invisible, Tessie Bear is sneezing, Mrs. Tubby Bear is barking and Noddy doesn't know what to do.
| 34 | 8 | "Noddy and His Money" | 16 November 1994 |
When Sly and Gobbo the Goblins see the bag of sixpences that Noddy has saved up, they will try anything to steal it. How can Noddy stop them?
| 35 | 9 | "Noddy Borrows Some Trousers" | 23 November 1994 |
| 35 | 9 | "Noddy Gets in a Mess" | 23 November 1994 |
Master Tubby Bear knocks Noddy's clothes off the washing line into the mud and puts treacle on his car seat, which means that Noddy has no clean trousers to wear. Big Ears helps him out by giving him a giant pair of trousers, and that's when the trouble really begins.
| 36 | 10 | "Noddy and His Alarm Clock" | 30 November 1994 |
Noddy has promised Dinah Doll that he will get up early to help her at the charity sale. But when his alarm clock breaks, Noddy wonders how he's going to get up in time to help.
| 37 | 11 | "Noddy Buys a Parasol" | 7 December 1994 |
Noddy wants to buy a parasol that he has seen at Dinah Doll's stall. To earn the money, he helps Clockwork Clown and Sammy Sailor and even opens a cleaning stall in the market. Will he earn enough money before the parasol is sold?
| 38 | 12 | "Noddy Tastes Some Cake" | 12 December 1994 |
Noddy wants to earn two sixpences so he can enter the Toytown Cake Tasting Contest, so he's delighted when Sally Skittle asks him to look after her children. But it's very tiring work, even with the help of Martha Monkey and her dressing up box!
| 39 | 13 | "Noddy the Dancer" | 13 December 1994 |
It's the evening of the Toytown Dancing Competition, and Tessie Bear has asked Noddy to be her partner. The only trouble is, he doesn't know how to dance - can he learn in time?

=== Christmas Special (1994) ===
| No. | UK title (top) US title (bottom) | Original release date |
|---|---|---|
| 40 | "Noddy and Father Christmas" | 14 December 1994 |
| 40 | "Noddy meets Santa Claus" | 14 December 1994 |
Father Christmas is coming to Toyland, and he's invited all the toys to a special Christmas party in the market square. But the trouble is, Sly and Gobbo the Goblins are threatening to spoil everything.

=== Series 4 (2000) ===
| No. overall | No. in series | Title | Original release date |
|---|---|---|---|
| 41 | 1 | "Noddy and the Magic Watch" | 10 January 2000 |
Noddy decides to buy himself a watch at Dinah Doll's stall, but on his way home, he is stopped by the mischievous Martha Monkey, who forces Noddy to drive to Stoney Bridge. Noddy does so and at 12:00, the entire world of Toyland, except for Noddy, is turned into lifeless statues!
| 42 | 2 | "Noddy and the Goblins" | 17 January 2000 |
Noddy is driving to the train station to collect a precious parcel for Miss Pink Cat, but the Goblins steal it before Noddy arrives. Can Big Ears and Noddy catch the Goblins and return the precious parcel to Miss Pink Cat?
| 43 | 3 | "Noddy and the Treasure Map" | 24 January 2000 |
Miss Pink Cat is organising a Top Toy Award in Toyland. When Noddy borrows a map from Mr. Tubby Bear and discovers it leads to hidden treasure, he finds himself with a surprise entry.
| 44 | 4 | "Noddy and the Singing Bush" | 31 January 2000 |
The Goblins want to get their hands on a magic singing bush. They put a spell on Noddy, but everyone comes to help and the Goblins are sent packing.
| 45 | 5 | "Noddy Gets Caught in a Storm" | 7 February 2000 |
Noddy and Bert Monkey decide to make some money by picking as many blackberries as they can. But as soon as they fill their baskets, the Goblins steal them! What will Noddy do when he finds the Goblins?
| 46 | 6 | "Noddy and the Noisy Drum" | 14 February 2000 |
Master Tubby Bear is given a new drum on his birthday, but when the Goblins cast a Can't Stop spell on Martha Monkey and she can't stop playing it, the noise starts to drive everyone mad!
| 47 | 7 | "Noddy Tidies Toyland" | 21 February 2000 |
Miss Pink Cat has offered a reward for rubbish collection, and Noddy is determined to win! However, he also has to collect Mr. Spark's car from the stream. Can he manage to tidy Toyland in time to collect the reward?
| 48 | 8 | "Noddy and the Bouncing Ball" | 28 February 2000 |
The Goblins are up to mischief again! They secretly swap Bumpy Dog's brand new birthday ball for their magic one, which whizzes around Toyland creating havoc and making noises. However, good old Big Ears soon comes to the rescue...
| 49 | 9 | "Noddy is Far Too Busy" | 6 March 2000 |
Noddy is very busy – he must earn enough sixpences to buy a beautiful scarf for Tessie Bear, and keep his promise to Mr and Mrs Noah. But will Noddy remember the important job he was supposed to do? And why are there strange, muddy footprints all over Toytown?
| 50 | 10 | "Noddy Tells a Story" | 13 March 2000 |
Bert Monkey's naughty tail knocks over Mr Tubby Bear's can of paint. Noddy thinks he is helping Bert by pretending that an imp knocked the paint over. But telling stories usually leads to more trouble.
| 51 | 11 | "Noddy and the Artists" | 20 March 2000 |
Everyone goes painting crazy, except for Dinah Doll. No one wants to buy from her stall anymore, so she decides to leave Toyland - unless Noddy and Big Ears can persuade her to stay.
| 52 | 12 | "Noddy the Nurse" | 27 March 2000 |
Big Ears and Noddy decide to have a tin-can day to frighten away the Goblins. But the Goblins have got other ideas and nothing goes to plan.
| 53 | 13 | "Noddy and the Driving Lesson" | 28 March 2000 |
Noddy needs to earn some sixpences quickly. Tessie Bear has a good idea but Noddy isn't too sure. The ‘good idea’ is letting Clockwork Mouse drive Noddy's car!

- Series 1 and 4 episodes share the title "Noddy and the Goblins": the former opens with "It had been a busy day in Toyland", while the latter opens with "It was a quiet morning in Toyland".

== Home media ==
In 2020, the series began streaming on NBCUniversal's Peacock and Apple TV. As of February 2023, apart from a complete series release that came out in 2009 exclusively to France, only one official DVD was released in the UK: a 1999 release of Noddy in Toyland with three episodes ("Noddy Lends A Hand", "Noddy Meets Some Silly Hens" and "Noddy and His Unhappy Car").

=== VHS releases in the United Kingdom ===
| | Release date | Episodes |
|---|---|---|
| Noddy and the Naughty Tail (BBCV 4850) | 5 October 1992 | "Noddy Loses Sixpence"; "Noddy And The Goblins"; "Noddy And The Naughty Tail"; "Noddy And The Pouring Rain" |
| Noddy 2: Noddy and the Kite (BBCV 4909) | 5 April 1993 | "Noddy And The Kite"; "Noddy And His Bell"; "Noddy And Martha Monkey"; "Noddy's New Friend" |
| Noddy 3: Noddy and the Milkman (BBCV 5129) | 4 October 1993 | "Noddy and the Milkman"; Noddy Delivers Some Parcels"; "Noddy and the Special Key"; "Noddy Gets a New Job" |
| Noddy 4: Noddy and the Missing Hats (BBCV 5385) | 5 September 1994 | "Noddy and the Missing Hats"; "Noddy and the Useful Rope"; "Noddy Loses his Bell"; "Noddy Cheers Up Big Ears" |
| Noddy Live! (BBCV 5463) | 31 October 1994 | Home video release of Noddy Live! stage play. |
| The Great Noddy Video (BBCV 5529) | 6 February 1995 | "Noddy Goes Shopping"; "Noddy Borrows An Umbrella"; "Noddy Meets Some Silly Hens"; "Noddy Lends A Hand"; "Noddy Finds A Furry Tail" |
| Noddy – To The Rescue (BBCV 5665) | 9 October 1995 | "Noddy To The Rescue"; "Noddy Sets A Trap"; "Noddy Has A Bad Day"; "Noddy And The Fishing Rod"; "Noddy and the Magic Night" |
| Noddy – The Champion (BBCV 5798) | 5 February 1996 | "Noddy The Champion"; "Noddy and The Warm Scarf"; "Noddy and the Golden Tree"; "Noddy and his Unhappy Car"; "Noddy Has An Afternoon Off" |
| Noddy – The Magician (BBCV 5911) | 7 October 1996 | "Noddy The Magician"; "Noddy and His Money"; "Noddy Borrows Some Trousers"; "Noddy and His Alarm Clock"; "Noddy Buys a Parasol" |
| Noddy – The Best of Noddy (BBCV 6121) | 12 May 1997 | "Noddy And The Goblins"; "Noddy and Martha Monkey"; "Noddy Gets a New Job"; "Noddy Meets Some Silly Hens"; "Noddy and The Golden Tree"; "Noddy and his Money" |
| Noddy: 2 on 1 – Noddy And The; Naughty Tail / Noddy And The Kite (BBCV 6352) | 2 February 1998 | "Noddy Loses Sixpence"; "Noddy and the Goblins"; "Noddy and The Naughty Tail"; "Noddy and The Pouring Rain"; "Noddy and the Kite"; "Noddy and his Bell"; "Noddy and Martha Monkey"; "Noddy's New Friend" |
| Noddy – Bumper Video. Magic Night and Other Stories (BBCV 6923) | 14 February 2000 | "Noddy and the Magic Night"; "Noddy and the Broken Bicycle"; "Noddy the Dancer"; "Noddy Delivers Some Parcels"; "Noddy Gets a New Job"; "Noddy and the Missing Hats"; "Noddy Borrows an Umbrella" |
| Noddy And The Bouncing Ball and Other Stories (BBCV 6984) | 4 September 2000 | "Noddy and the Bouncing Ball"; "Noddy Tidies Toyland"; "Noddy and the Goblins"; "Noddy and the Magic Watch"; "Noddy Gets Caught in a Storm" |
| Noddy's Big Video (BBCV 7222) | 9 July 2001 | "Noddy and The Noisy Drum"; "Noddy Is Far Too Busy"; "Noddy and The Artists"; "Noddy and The Singing Bush"; "Noddy Tells a Story"; "Noddy and The Nurse"; "Noddy and The Treasure Map" |

=== VHS releases in the United States ===
In the US, a few VHS Tapes were released by PolyGram Video/USA Home Entertainment using the US Dub from Noddy, and two exclusive songs.

| Video Name | Release Year | Episodes |
|---|---|---|
| Noddy Gives a Birthday Party | 1999 | Noddy Gives a Birthday Party (a.k.a. “Noddy Delivers Some Parcels); Noddy the Dancer; Noddy Gets In a Mess (a.k.a. “Noddy Borrows Some Trousers”) |
| Noddy Makes a New Friend | 1999 | Noddy Makes a New Friend (a.k.a. “Noddy's New Friend”; Noddy Loses Some Money (a.k.a. “Noddy Loses Sixpence”); Noddy & His Alarm Clock |
| Noddy Loses His Bell | 2000 | Noddy Loses His Bell; Noddy Learns and Listens (a.k.a. “Noddy & The Missing Hats); Noddy Gets Blamed (a.k.a. “Noddy Finds a Furry Tail) |
| Noddy & The Magic Night | 2000 | Noddy & The Magic Night; Noddy the Magician; Noddy & The Golden Tree |
