= Astro Farm =

- Created by: Andy Ellis; David Yates
- Voices of: Tina Heath; Jonathan Kydd; Richard Tate
- Opening theme: Dave Cooke; Paul Field
- Country of origin: United Kingdom
- Original language: English
- No. of seasons: 5
- No. of episodes: 53

Production
- Executive producer: David Yates
- Producer: Kath Swain
- Editor: Simon Cox
- Running time: 10 minutes
- Production companies: FilmFair London; Central Independent Television

Original release
- Network: ITV (CITV)
- Release: 11 September 1992 – 4 December 1996

Astro Farm is a British children's television series animated using stop-motion animation. It follows the adventures of the Foxwoods, a small family who live and work on an asteroid covered in farmland.

Astro Farm was produced by FilmFair for Central Independent Television and was first broadcast on CITV in 1992.

== Synopsis ==
The main action takes place in outer space on an asteroid dedicated to farming. The Foxwoods live in a small cottage with a barn, while Daisy the cow lives on a separate farm. The atmosphere is artificial and controlled by the weather machine in the cottage. The Gorups live on a nearby asteroid known as 'Gorp Dale', which is dark and wet.

The principal characters are Sam; his wife Lizzie; their son Tom; Dinko, a dog; Daisy the cow; and blue chickens called Clucks. Other characters include the Gorups, Splodger and Biff, two miscreants who steal food and cause trouble at the farm.

== Episodes ==
=== Series 1 (1992) ===
1. Wacky Weather (11 September 1992)
2. Flying Dinko (18 September 1992)
3. The Well (25 September 1992)
4. Moo Flu (2 October 1992)
5. Astro Dragon (9 October 1992)
6. Butterfly (16 October 1992)
7. Disappearing Bubbles (23 October 1992)
8. The Big Sneeze (30 October 1992)
9. The Tomato Competition (6 November 1992)
10. Barn Dance (13 November 1992)
11. The Black Hole Mole (20 November 1992)
12. Training Dinko (27 November 1992)
13. The Surprise (4 December 1992)

=== Series 2 (1993) ===
1. Biff Builds a Rocket (8 October 1993)
2. Cluck Soup (15 October 1993)
3. Holiday (22 October 1993)
4. King Splodger (29 October 1993)
5. Lizzie's Quiet Day (5 November 1993)
6. Pumpkin (12 November 1993)
7. Seeing Double (19 November 1993)
8. Shrinking Machine (26 November 1993)
9. Solar Wind (3 December 1993)
10. Wild Martian Tiger (10 December 1993)
11. Wishing Well (17 December 1993)

=== Series 3 (1994) ===
1. All Aboard! (13 October 1994)
2. Astro Dale Farm (20 October 1994)
3. Bath Time (27 October 1994)
4. Biffs' Baby (3 November 1994)
5. Crow Twins (10 November 1994)
6. Dial G For Gorp Dale (17 November 1994)
7. Magic Onions (24 November 1994)
8. Spooked (1 December 1994)
9. Super Tom (8 December 1994)

=== Series 4 (1995) ===
1. 1, 2, 3, Pull! (28 September 1995)
2. A Mole in One (5 October 1995)
3. Biff, Do Your Best! (12 October 1995)
4. Cowboy Tom (19 October 1995)
5. Dragon Moon (26 October 1995)
6. Futile Attraction (2 November 1995)
7. Pied Piper of Gorp Dale (9 November 1995)
8. Slim Curd Everywhere! (16 November 1995)
9. Splodger, the Spider (23 November 1995)
10. That Takes the Biscuit! (30 November 1995)

=== Series 5 (1996) ===
1. Lucky Dip (2 October 1996)
2. Mouse Quake (9 October 1996)
3. Pigs Might Fly (16 October 1996)
4. Poultry in Motion (23 October 1996)
5. Spaced-out Splodger (30 October 1996)
6. Sparks Fly! (6 November 1996)
7. Splodgers' About! (13 November 1996)
8. Surprise! Surprise! (20 November 1996)
9. To Catch a Thief (27 November 1996)
10. Tom and the Beanstalk (4 December 1996)

== Re-airings ==
The series was repeated on CITV until 1996 and then aired on Nickelodeon in 1997. Nickelodeon aired only the first series, as it was the only one remastered by CINAR after it acquired FilmFair London and remastered the studio's shows.

== Home media ==
In the United Kingdom, in 1992, Pickwick Video originally released two VHS tapes of the series, containing Series 1 episodes. Those were reissued in 1995 by Carlton Home Entertainment.

=== UK VHS releases ===
- Pickwick (1992)
- Carlton Home Entertainment (1995)
