= Bestime =

British jigsaw puzzle and game manufacturer

Bestime (also spelled BeStime or Bes-time) was a British manufacturer of jigsaw puzzles and games. In the 1950s and 1960s, the company was best known for its jigsaws created by Enid Blyton. The company made the first four puzzles in 1948, including an Amelia Jane jigsaw (the first jigsaw) and released over 20. The Famous Five series of jigsaws were illustrated by Eileen Soper. Harmsen van der Beek was the illustrator for the Noddy series of jigsaws as with the books. Bestime also made the Blyton Giant Tiddley Winks Game. In 1954, Bestime released the first four jigsaws of The Secret Seven. The company was dissolved in 1973.
