= Noddy, Toyland Detective =

Television series

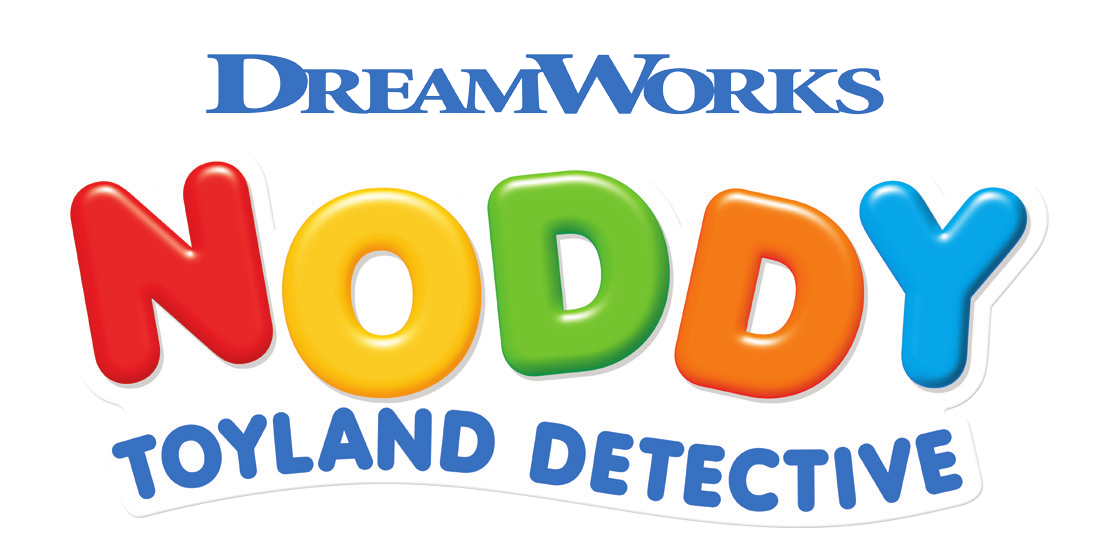
- French: Oui-Oui, Enquêtes au Pays des Jouets
- Based on: Noddy by Enid Blyton
- Developed by: Heath Kenny; Myles McLeod
- Directed by: Albert Pereira-Lazaro; Fabien Lemaître (S2E40–52)
- Voices of: Valin Shinyei; Jonathan Kydd; Bob Golding; Martha Howe-Douglas; Jess Robinson
- Composers: Cyrille Marchesseau; David Gana
- Countries of origin: France; United Kingdom; United States
- Original languages: French; English
- No. of seasons: 2
- No. of episodes: 104

Production
- Executive producers: Pierre Belaïsch (S1); Sidonie Dumas (S2); Christophe Riandée (S2); Annika Bluhm (S2); Nicolas Atlan (S2)
- Producer: Gaëlle Guiny (S1)
- Running time: 11 minutes
- Production companies: Gaumont Animation; DreamWorks Animation Television

Original release
- Network: France 5/Piwi+ (France); Channel 5 (United Kingdom); Universal Kids (United States)
- Release: April 18, 2016 – March 22, 2020

Related
- Make Way for Noddy; Noddy in Toyland

Noddy, Toyland Detective (French: Oui-Oui, Enquêtes au Pays des Jouets) is a animated mystery comedy television series featuring the character Noddy created by Enid Blyton. The series was produced by DreamWorks Animation Television and Gaumont Animation. Commissioned by France Télévisions, it premiered on March 26, 2016, on the platform Zouzous, and aired on France 5, on April 2, 2016.

== Characters ==
=== Main ===
- Noddy (voiced by Louis Ashbourne Serkis in Series 1 and Santiago Winder in Series 2 in the British English version, Valin Shinyei and Antonio Mattera in the American English version, and Brigitte Lecordier in the French version) is an investigator in Toyland. Whenever Noddy finds a mystery difficult to solve, and says "This investigation is really hard", Bumpy, Big Ears, or Revs usually encourages him, and he always goes back to what Big Ears/ Mr. Squeaks always says, "A good investigator looks and looks again", "thinks and thinks again", or "investigates and investigates again". Whenever he knows that he's solved the case, the bell on his blue hat rings, and he says "Ring a Ding". He also uses his pad to help him solve cases to compare what he has taken photos of and asks, "who wears…"?, or "who has…?" At the end of each episode, he takes a group photo after the mystery has been solved and declares "case... closed!"
- Bumpy the Dog is Noddy's dog and trusty sidekick. He licks Noddy's face, whenever he says, this investigation's really hard, and afterwards thanks Bumpy and then quotes Big Ears.
- Big Ears (voiced by Jonathan Kydd) is Noddy's neighbor and mentor. He is a squeaky toy brownie. He is known as Mr. Squeaks in the North American dub. Prior to Noddy starting his investigation, Big Ears always asks him, "How are you going to solve this one Noddy"?, of "what are you going to do today Noddy?" Whenever Noddy solves a case, he says to him, "Well done Noddy, you've solved the investigation, how did you do it? Noddy then does a trick by twirling his pad on his finger, and says, "Thanks", and explains how he did it.
- Revs is Noddy's red and yellow car which is alive and communicates by using the horn. He can also transform into a helicopter.

=== Supporting ===
- Pat-Pat (voiced by Martha Howe-Douglas) is one of Noddy's closest friends. She's a creative, kind and friendly Panda plush toy who wears a pink dress. She has three smaller panda friends called the Pockets. The Pockets are extremely high-energy and excitable. When running they transform into black and white tennis balls.
- Deltoid (voiced by Bob Golding) is a male, futuristic toy superhero with a white sleeveless shirt, and tall, blonde hair. He is the strongest toy in all of Toyland, and aspires to be brave and noble, but is sometimes afraid and naive. He may have a crush on Smartysaurus. He usually makes statements like; "I, deltoid…" or "ha ha ha ha", when showing off his athletic skills. He can also be something of a clutz, not least because he occasionally forgets things.
- Smartysaurus (voiced by Jess Robinson) is a female, blue toy dinosaur who wears a white lab coat and clear goggles. She is a super smart scientist. She often adds "-saurus" or "-asarus" to the ends of words like when she describes herself as a "clumsy-saurus" or says "point-asaurus" when remembering how to perform a dance move. She also usually wears purple sunglasses and a lab coat, as such, making her Toyland's resident (and only) scientist.
- Fuse (voiced by Jonathan Kydd) is a male, white, modern toy robot, with a blue coloured screen that shows his face. He can change his face by saying the way he feels, and the face that goes with the feeling he has said (like Baby from Kuu Kuu Harajuku) He is emotional, but gleeful.
- Farmer Tom is a friendly farmer and near neighbor to Pat-Pat.
- Tractor is Farmer Tom's tractor who communicates by using his horn.
- Clockwork Mouse is a female wind-up mouse who dresses in a yellow blouse with daisies, who is the mayor of Brickabuild. She is loosely based on the character from the classic Noddy series.
- Carlton is a male, wheeled cat toy who dresses in a yellow suit jacket with green pants, and is Clockwork Mouse's assistant and chauffeur.
- Queen Sparklewings is the queen of Fable Forest. She has brown hair in a bun, and a long, sparkly white dress
- Coco and Cleo are two fairies in Fable Forest, who are also best friends.
- Pirates are four pirates and their parrot Scurvy who live in Pirate Cove, Captain, First Mate Pirate Stripes, and two unnamed pirates.
- Ninjas are four ninjas who live in Daredale, wearing blue, green, pink, and red.
- The Knights – Five Knights in Fable Forest. They're shown to be somewhat clumsy, but not so much that they may be considered inept.
- The Naughticorns are three unicorns who live in the Fable Forest Stables.
  - Hoof is an indigo, male Unicorn with straight, dark blue hair. He is emotional and silly, he often plays pranks on others, and sometimes it hurts their feelings. But inside, he has a good heart, and always apologizes when he does something wrong.
  - Bling is a pink, female Unicorn with curly, dark pink hair. She is very vain, and looks at her appearance often. She also thinks of herself a lot, and She sometimes makes remarks that aren't nice. But she makes up for them later, and tries to be a good friend to others.
  - Cloppycorn is a White, male unicorn with shaggy, light blue green hair. He is smaller than the other two, and is shy. Hoof and Bling often make him do things they don't want to do first. He always tries to get attention from them, but they sometimes forget about him. But they truly do like him, and try their best to be nice to him.
- The Builders are construction workers in Brickabuild.
- Train is an emotional, prone to worry train that blows bubbles.
- Driver Dylan is Train's Driver.

== Development ==
The series was produced by Gaumont Animation and DreamWorks Animation Television, with the participation of France Télévisions and Piwi+. The show was developed by Heath Kenny, Diane Morel and Myles McLeod.

== Episodes ==
=== Series overview ===
| Season | Segments | Episodes | Originally released | |
| Season | Segments | Episodes | First released | Last released |
|---|---|---|---|---|
| 1 | 54 | 34 | April 18, 2016 | May 21, 2017 |
| 2 | 52 | 26 | October 22, 2018 | March 22, 2020 |

=== Season 1 (2016) ===
| No. | Title | Directed by | Written by | Storyboard by | Original release date |
|---|---|---|---|---|---|
| 1 | "Noddy and the Case of the Broken Crystal Memory Game" | Albert Pereira-Lazaro | Jo Jordan | Anthony Ferré & Amanda Sun | 18 April 2016 |
The DareDale Challenge obstacle race is about to start when it is discovered that the crystal memory game is broken. Whilst Clockwork Mouse and Fuse set about preparing and mending it, Noddy and Revs try to find out who was responsible.
| 2 | "Noddy and the Case of the Amazing Eyebrows" | Albert Pereira-Lazaro | Myles McLeod | Serge Tanguy | 19 April 2016 |
Fuse wants to wear his new eyebrows when he collected his own trophy at the Toyland award ceremony, but they go missing, along with a few other items. As a bell was heard each time something went missing, Noddy is blamed for stealing them, and must try to clear his name.
| 3 | "Noddy and the Case of the Hiding Pirates" | Albert Pereira-Lazaro | Tom Stevenson | Serge Tanguy | 20 April 2016 |
When Scurvy the parrot arrives at Toy Green for the Pirate Parade all on his own, Noddy soon realises the pirates are missing and investigate why they are hiding.
| 4 | "Noddy and the Case of the Missing Music Player" | Albert Pereira-Lazaro | Myles McLeod | Olivier Daube & Anthony Ferré | 21 April 2016 |
Noddy wonders who has taken his music player, which he needs to accompany tonight's dance party.
| 5 | "Noddy and the Case of the Sleepy Toys" | Albert Pereira-Lazaro | Rebecca Stevens | Luc Blanchard & Anthony Ferré | 22 April 2016 |
No one in Brickabuild can get any sleep because someone keeps turning on the lights all night, and as a consequence, everyone keeps falling asleep during the day. Unless Noddy can find the culprit, all buildings in Toyland may stop for good.
| 6 | "Noddy and the Case of the Secret Deliveries" | Albert Pereira-Lazaro | Myles McLeod | Yves Montagne | 25 April 2016 |
Noddy tries to find out who is left presents in Toyland so that the residents of the town can thank them for them.
| 7 | "Noddy and the Case of the Little Lost Toy" | Albert Pereira-Lazaro | Rebecca Stevens | David Canoville | 26 April 2016 |
When a little clockwork duck turns up at the DinoLab, Noddy tries to find out where it comes from and return it to its family.
| 8 | "Noddy and the Case of Jumpy Revs" | Albert Pereira-Lazaro | Louise Kramskoy | Serge Tanguy | 27 April 2016 |
When all of the metal objects in Toyland keep jumping in one direction, Noddy and Revs must track down the cause.
| 9 | "Noddy and the Case of Deltoid's Strange Behavior" | Albert Pereira-Lazaro | Gerard Foster | Alexis Gachet | 28 April 2016 |
Smartysaurus is upset because her best friend Deltoid keeps running away from her, so Noddy tries to get to the bottom of the mystery.
| 10 | "Noddy and the Case of the Slippery Stage" | Albert Pereira-Lazaro | Annetta Zucchi | Alexis Gachet | 29 April 2016 |
Pat-Pat is meant to be giving a baton-twirling display at the town hall, but someone has spread slippery, sticky stuff on the stage. Noddy decides to find out who is responsible.
| 11 | "Noddy and the Case of the Broken Toy Wash" | Albert Pereira-Lazaro | Gerard Foster | Yves Montagne | 2 May 2016 |
Fuse is upset because his new toy wash has been broken, and Noddy uses his investigating skills to find out who the culprit is.
| 12 | "Noddy and the Case of the Dazzle Dragon" | Albert Pereira-Lazaro | Myles McLeod | Alexis Gachet | 3 May 2016 |
The sleuth investigates when there are signs that a dragon has come to live in Fable Forest for the first time.
| 13 | "Noddy and the Case of the Sticky Putty" | Albert Pereira-Lazaro | Anastasia Heinzl | Anaïs Chevillard | 4 May 2016 |
Noddy realises that someone has put sticky putty on Clockwork Mouse's key and comes up with a clever solution when he finds out who did it and why.
| 14 | "Noddy and the Case of the Toyland Accidents" | Albert Pereira-Lazaro | Mathilde Maraninchi & Antonin Poirée | Serge Tanguy | 5 May 2016 |
Trees are falling down and machines are going crazy, and Noddy needs to use all his investigating skills to find out who is causing all the trouble.
| 15 | "Noddy and the Case of the Blue Wall" | Albert Pereira-Lazaro | Mathilde Maraninchi & Antonin Poirée | Olivier Ducrest | 6 May 2016 |
No one can play hide-and seek in Brickabuild until Noddy can find out who has painted the workshop wall blue.
| 16 | "Noddy and the Case of the Fable Forest Gold" | Albert Pereira-Lazaro | Gerard Foster | Lucie Gardes | 7 May 2016 |
Noddy must help the pirates find the long-lost Fable Forest gold treasure, or they will have to leave Toyland forever.
| 17 | "Noddy and the Case of the Unhelpful Queen" | Albert Pereira-Lazaro | Anastasia Heinzl | Alexis Gachet | 16 June 2016 (Channel 5) |
One of the knights tries a magic spell and accidentally shrinks himself, but with Queen Sparklewings in hiding, Noddy has to persuade her to return to the little soldier to the right size.
| 18 | "Noddy and the Case of the Mystery Artist" | Albert Pereira-Lazaro | Louise Kramskoy | Anaïs Chevillard | 17 June 2016 (Channel 5) |
Someone is scribbling on everyone's drawings of Deltoid, but Noddy saves the day by following clues to find out who the mystery artist is and why all the pictures have been defaced.
| 19 | "Noddy and the Case of Bling's Hidden Present" | Albert Pereira-Lazaro | Anastasia Heinzl | Lucie Gardes | 29 August 2016 (Channel 5) |
Bling is so excited about her birthday that she starts opening all her presents ahead of schedule. Mr. Squeaks hides his gift to stop her but ends up forgetting where he put it.
| 20 | "Noddy and the Case of the Big Wall of Bricks" | Albert Pereira-Lazaro | Gerard Foster | Antoine Antin & Olivier Ducrest | 30 August 2016 (Channel 5) |
Noddy admires Fuse's new electronic ball and suggests that all the toys come round to play with it later.
| 21 | "Noddy and the Case of the Snow Mystery" | Albert Pereira-Lazaro | Myles McLeod | Sophie Krettly | 26 December 2016 (Channel 5) |
It's Christmas Day, and Noddy wants it to snow, but Mr. Squeaks tells him that it has never snowed in Toyland.
| 22 | "Noddy and the Case of the Wonky Toys" | Albert Pereira-Lazaro | Simon Lecocq | David Canoville & Anthony Ferré | 31 August 2016 (Channel 5) |
The toys visit Fuse's workshop for a check-up, but when they come out wonky, Noddy must find out the cause before everyone stops working properly.
| 23 | "Noddy and the Case of the Tug-of-War Rope" | Albert Pereira-Lazaro | Marie Beardmore | Serge Tanguy | 25 October 2016 |
The Pirates and the Ninjas line up for the tug of war contest in Daredale, but the rope snaps, leaving Noddy to find out who cut it.
| 24 | "Noddy and the Case of the Runaway Animals" | Albert Pereira-Lazaro | Gerard Foster | Olivier Ducrest | 2 September 2016 (Channel 5) |
All the farm animals escape and cause chaos in Toy Green. Noddy and his friends find that rounding then up and returning them to the farm is easier said than done.
| 25 | "Noddy and the Case of the Rules of the Game" | Albert Pereira-Lazaro | Simon Lecocq | Serge Tanguy | 10 October 2016 (Channel 5) |
Pat Pat and the pirates have fallen out over who has won a board game because they have lost the rules, so Noddy needs to find them so that everyone can be friends again
| 26 | "Noddy and the Case of Smartysaurus's Rainbow Experiment" | Albert Pereira-Lazaro | Cédric & Marine Lachenaud | Sophie Krettly | 11 October 2016 (Channel 5) |
When Smartysaurus' latest experiment sees her attempt to make a rainbow, something goes wrong, and Noddy needs to investigate.
| 27 | "Noddy and the Case of the Lost Race" | Albert Pereira-Lazaro | Anastasia Heinzl | David Canoville & Anthony Ferré | 12 October 2016 (Channel 5) |
Revs unexpectedly slows down during a race, and when Noddy tries to find out why, he discovers that Revs was hoping to help a friend.
| 28 | "Noddy and the Case of the Broken Xylophone Bridge" | Albert Pereira-Lazaro | Simon Lecocq | Anaïs Chevillard | 13 October 2016 (Channel 5) |
Noddy and Mr. Squeaks find that someone has broken a key on the xylophone bridge and tried to fix it with sticky tape.
| 29 | "Noddy and the Case of the Toyland Mischief Maker" | Albert Pereira-Lazaro | Marie Beardmore | Anaïs Chevillard | 14 October 2016 (Channel 5) |
Mr. Squeaks' teapot goes missing, and Noddy is surprised to find it hanging from a lamp post. When Bumpy's kennel goes missing too, Noddy needs to investigate before Toyland descends into trouble.
| 30 | "Noddy and the Case of the Popping Balloons" | Albert Pereira-Lazaro | Gerard Foster | Olivier Ducrest | 23 January 2017 (Channel 5) |
Noddy and his friends are each given a colorful balloon at the end of Smartysaurus's party, but when a number of balloons start popping, Noddy tries to find out why.
| 31 | "Noddy and the Case of the Pink Lettuces" | Albert Pereira-Lazaro | Mathilde Maraninchi & Antonin Poirée | David Canoville & Anthony Ferré | 24 January 2017 (Channel 5) |
When Smartysaurus reveals that she had a special request for pink paint, the Ninjas admit to turning the lettuces into pom-poms to cheer on Pink Ninja in her marathon attempt.
| 32 | "Noddy and the Case of the Missing Jigsaw Puzzle Pieces" | Albert Pereira-Lazaro | Gerard Foster | Anthony Ferré | 25 January 2017 (Channel 5) |
Mr. Squeaks can not complete his jigsaw puzzle because some of the pieces are missing, so Noddy sets out to find out who has taken them and why.
| 33 | "Noddy and the Case of the Disappearing Rainbow" | Albert Pereira-Lazaro | Jo Jordan | Anthony Ferré & Amanda Sun | 26 January 2017 (Channel 5) |
Somebody is causing all the accidents in Toyland, and Noddy tries to find out who before something gets broken for good.
| 34 | "Noddy and the Case of the Flying Toy" | Albert Pereira-Lazaro | Gerard Foster | Serge Tanguy | 27 January 2017 (Channel 5) |
Queen Sparklewings's wand goes missing, and Noddy suspects that someone is using it to perform magic because all over Toyland, Deltoid, Fuse, Spike, and Smartysaurus have started to float in the air.
| 35 | "Noddy and the Case of the Spooky Noise" | Albert Pereira-Lazaro | Gerard Foster | Lucie Gardes | November 18, 2016 |
Noddy is looking forward to Pat-Pat's pumpkin party, but when he arrives, he finds that the other toys are worried about a strange noise. Noddy decides to investigate - could it be coming from the Naughticorns, who borrowed his music player...?
| 36 | "Noddy and the Case of the Upset Animals" | Albert Pereira-Lazaro | Anastasia Heinzl | Lucie Gardes | 24 July 2017 (Channel 5) |
Nobody at the farm can get to sleep, so Noddy travels all over Toyland, gathering clues to find out what has been disturbing the animals.
| 37 | "Noddy and the Case of the Empty Swapsie Wagon" | Albert Pereira-Lazaro | Sandrine Joly | Hülya Güç | 25 July 2017 (Channel 5) |
The fairies' yo-yo has disappeared, and now no one will trust Cloppycorn to pull the wagon again, so Noddy comes to the rescue
| 38 | "Noddy and the Case of the Unhappy Unicorn" | Albert Pereira-Lazaro | Louise Kramskoy | Sophie Krettly | 18 November 2016 |
Snuggleball, Cloppycorn's special felt ball, goes missing. Then Noddy finds out that Pat-Pat broke Snuggleball by mistake.
| 39 | "Noddy and the Case of the Sticker Mystery" | Albert Pereira-Lazaro | Myles McLeod | Gaultier Buiret | 2 February 2017 |
New stickers with a picture of a mysterious bandit have appeared in Toyland, so Clockwork Mouse asks Noddy to investigate.
| 40 | "Noddy and the Case of the Stolen Treasure" | Albert Pereira-Lazaro | Mathilde Maraninchi & Antonin Poirée | Anthony Ferré & Paul Hervé | 3 February 2017 |
The pirates spring clean their galleon - much to the annoyance of Pirate Stripes, who wants to go on a treasure hunt. Later that day, the pirate treasure disappears.
| 41 | "Noddy and the Case of the Moving Train Tracks" | Albert Pereira-Lazaro | Simon Lecocq | Anthony Ferré & Hélène Sauvagnat | 4 February 2017 |
Noddy is on the case when someone moves the train tracks, stopping everyone from getting to Fable Forest for the annual fairy picnic.
| 42 | "Noddy and the Case of the King Of Toyland" | Albert Pereira-Lazaro | Gerard Foster | Serge Tanguy | 1 August 2017 (Channel 5) |
A new ruler mysteriously appears in Toy Green and begins building a huge castle.
| 43 | "Noddy and the Case of the Fly-Away Balloons" | Albert Pereira-Lazaro | Nicolas Chrétien | Olivier Ducrest | 2 August 2017 (Channel 5) |
Noddy must work fast to discover why all the balloons for a special festival in Toyama have disappeared.
| 44 | "Noddy and the Case of the Missing Bricks" | Albert Pereira-Lazaro | Nicolas Chrétien | Olivier Ducrest, Anthony Ferré & Gaston Jaunet | 3 August 2017 (Channel 5) |
The little wooden boy and his friends are building a toy tower, but someone is trying to stop them.
| 45 | "Noddy and the Case of the Missing Anchor" | Albert Pereira-Lazaro | Sandrine Joly (idea) & Simon Lecocq | Olivier Ducrest | 4 August 2017 (Channel 5) |
The brightly-dressed sleuth tries to find a way to avert a crisis when a ship sails out of control.
| 46 | "Noddy and the Case of the Disappearing Traffic Cones" | Albert Pereira-Lazaro | Mathilde Maraninchi & Antonin Poirée | Gaultier Buiret | 7 August 2017 (Channel 5) |
All the traffic in Brickabuild is in chaos because the cones have disappeared, so Noddy decides to investigate.
| 47 | "Noddy and the Case of the Disappearing Special Things" | Albert Pereira-Lazaro | Gerard Foster | Sophie Krettly | 8 August 2017 (Channel 5) |
Someone has taken all of Fuse's special things. The little robot is very upset, and Noddy needs all his investigating skills to find the collection again.
| 48 | "Noddy and the Case of the Grey Coins" | Albert Pereira-Lazaro | Simon Lecocq | Hélène Sauvagnat | 25 September 2017 (Channel 5) |
Someone is covering everything golden in Toyland with grey paint, and Noddy tries to find out who it is.
| 49 | "Noddy and the Case of Bumpy's Burst Ball" | Albert Pereira-Lazaro | Mathilde Maraninchi & Antonin Poirée | Anthony Ferré | 26 September 2017 (Channel 5) |
Bumpy's ball has gone missing, so Noddy gets him a new one, but when he goes to get it from his cupboard, he finds that it has burst.
| 50 | "Noddy and the Case of the Missing Wings" | Albert Pereira-Lazaro | Cédric & Marine Lachenaud | Sophie Krettly | 27 September 2017 (Channel 5) |
The fairies are due to give a big flying display in Toyland, but Fairy Coco's wings have gone missing.
| 51 | "Noddy and the Case of the Unfunny Clown" | Albert Pereira-Lazaro | Jo Jordan | Olivier Ducrest | 28 September 2017 (Channel 5) |
Everyone is dressing up as clowns, but the fun stops when a strange clown starts playing practical jokes that are not funny at all.
| 52 | "Noddy and the Case of the Raining Carrots" | Albert Pereira-Lazaro | Nicolas Chrétien | Romain Cislo & Lucie Gardes | May 21, 2017 |
The little boy must find out who is causing vegetables to rain down all over Toyland, or Farmer Tom's farm fair will be ruined.

=== Season 2 (2018) ===
| No. overall | No. in season | Title | Directed by | Written by | Original release date |
|---|---|---|---|---|---|
| 53 | 1 | "The Case of the Missing Pockets" | Albert Pereira-Lazaro | Ciaran Murtagh and Andrew Jones | 22 October 2018 (UK) |
Pat-Pat decides to join up with Noddy and become a detective for the day. The only problem is they do not have a case to solve until the Pockets go missing. Wanting to find where they are, Noddy and Pat-Pat start to investigate.
| 54 | 2 | "The Case of the Cabbage Monster" | Albert Pereira-Lazaro | Emma Nisbet | 23 October 2018 (UK) |
Pat-Pat thinks that a cabbage monster must be on the loose when Farmer Tom's cabbages go missing. Noddy is not so sure, but when Driver Dylan claims to have seen it, Noddy decides to investigate. Can Pat-Pat be correct?
| 55 | 3 | "The Case of the Stolen Key" | Albert Pereira-Lazaro | Denise Cassar | 24 October 2018 (UK) |
It is the day of the Toyland Singalong and Clockwork Mouse, an enthusiastic but awful singer, says everything must be perfect. But then her precious key goes missing, and Noddy investigates.
| 56 | 4 | "The Case of the Runaway Train" | Albert Pereira-Lazaro | Tony Cooke | 25 October 2018 (UK) |
Everyone in Toyland is ready to board Train for a Big Day Out, but Train runs off down the tracks without any passengers. Noddy tries to find out why Train drove away to literally save the day.
| 57 | 5 | "The Case of Revs Not Listening" | Albert Pereira-Lazaro | Rebecca Stevens | 26 October 2018 (UK) |
Noddy looking forward to his first ever go at driving Train. But Revs is playing up and ignoring him, even when Noddy asks him to stop.
| 58 | 6 | "The Case of the Lost Space Rocket" | Albert Pereira-Lazaro | Gerard Foster | 29 October 2018 (UK) |
Smartysaurus is about to launch into space in her super space rocket. But as her friends all watch on the Daredale Big Screen, the picture suddenly goes dead Noddy must find out what has happened and if she has crashed or been captured by aliens.
| 59 | 7 | "The Case of the Fallen Star" | Albert Pereira-Lazaro | Rebecca Stevens | 30 October 2018 (UK) |
When the brightest star in the sky falls, Noddy has to find it and work out how to get it back into its place in the sky before its light goes out forever.
| 60 | 8 | "The Case of Smartysaurus's Jet Pack" | Albert Pereira-Lazaro | Anastasia Heinzl | 31 October 2018 (UK) |
Smartysaurus finds she cannot control her new jet pack because she has not read the instructions before taking off. When Deltoid destroys the manual, Noddy must come up with a clever plan to rescue her.
| 61 | 9 | "The Case of the Topsy Turvy Trees" | Albert Pereira-Lazaro | Denise Cassar | 1 November 2018 (UK) |
Everything is set for the Toy Green picnic when Noddy finds that some of the trees have been turned upside-down. Noddy investigates if the Ninjas were climbing on them or if the Pirates wanted an upside-down tree for Pirate Bay.
| 62 | 10 | "The Case of the Missing Banner" | Albert Pereira-Lazaro | Anastasia Heinzl | 2 November 2018 (UK) |
The banner for Revs' Air Show has disappeared. Noddy investigates if somebody is trying to spoil the show.
| 63 | 11 | "The Case of the Annoying Butterflies" | Albert Pereira-Lazaro | Mathilde Maraninchi and Antonin Poirée | April 23, 2019 |
Noddy investigates strange new paper butterflies that are pestering the toys.
| 64 | 12 | "The Case of the Torn-Out Pages" | Albert Pereira-Lazaro | Lucy Vallin | April 23, 2019 |
The final pages of Queen Sparklewings' fairy-tale book are found to have been ripped out. Noddy tries to find who was responsible and restore the pages to the book, or the Queen's special storytelling will have to be canceled.
| 65 | 13 | "The Case of the Untidy Pirates" | Albert Pereira-Lazaro | Denise Cassar | April 25, 2019 |
Noddy wants to win the Tidy Toyland trophy on Tidy Toyland Day, but he has invited the untidy pirates round to play.
| 66 | 14 | "The Case of the Stuck Toys" | Albert Pereira-Lazaro | Lucy Vallin | April 25, 2019 |
The toys get stuck at the railway station when someone spreads glue all over the platform.
| 67 | 15 | "The Case of Deltoid's Missing Strength" | Albert Pereira-Lazaro | Sam Barlow and Gerard Foster | April 27, 2019 |
When action hero Deltoid starts making things and singing, while normally arty Pat-Pat becomes super-strong, Noddy realises that there has been a mix-up but knows how to swap them back.
| 68 | 16 | "The Case of the Golden Thing" | Albert Pereira-Lazaro | Gerard Foster | April 27, 2019 |
The Knights find a mysterious golden thing, but the Pirates insist that it is theirs.
| 69 | 17 | "The Case of the Toyland Circus" | Albert Pereira-Lazaro | Rebecca Stevens | May 1, 2019 |
Most of the toys are rehearsing for an act at the Toyland Circus - except for Smartysaurus.
| 70 | 18 | "The Case of the Ruined Race" | Albert Pereira-Lazaro | Emma Nisbet | May 1, 2019 |
When the egg-and-spoon race grinds to a halt, Noddy discovers someone may be trying to sabotage the Brickabuild Sports and Fun Day.
| 71 | 19 | "The Case of the Unfinished Building" | Albert Pereira-Lazaro | Nicolas Chrétien | May 3, 2019 |
Strange accidents keep happening on the building site, and Clockwork Mouse thinks someone is trying to stop them finishing the work.
| 72 | 20 | "The Case of the Missing Investigation Kit" | Albert Pereira-Lazaro | Simon Lecocq | May 3, 2019 |
The little wooden boy loses his investigation kit and needs Bumpy and Revs' help to find it before the Royal Egg Hunt begins.
| 73 | 21 | "The Case of Revs and Tractor" | Albert Pereira-Lazaro | Simon Lecocq | May 7, 2019 |
Revs and Tractor are doing Tom's deliveries together, but only one of them comes back.
| 74 | 22 | "The Case of the Upset Captain" | Albert Pereira-Lazaro | Baptiste Heidrich | May 7, 2019 |
When the Pirate Captain hides in his cabin and says that he does not want to be the captain anymore, Noddy discovers that someone has taken his beard.
| 75 | 23 | "The Case of the Lost Pirates" | Albert Pereira-Lazaro | Gerard Foster | May 9, 2019 |
Armed with a new navigation device, the Pirates set out on the Pirate Challenge, sailing all around Toyland.
| 76 | 24 | "The Case of the Clockwork Mystery" | Albert Pereira-Lazaro | Tony Cooke | May 9, 2019 |
Everyone is excited about Toyland's first Winter Light Festival, except Clockwork Mouse, who is organising the event.
| 77 | 25 | "The Case of the Knocked Down Fences" | Albert Pereira-Lazaro | Baptiste Heidrich | May 10, 2019 |
Hoof blames Bling when he finds all the fences knocked down on his obstacle course.
| 78 | 26 | "The Case of Damaged Magic Box" | Albert Pereira-Lazaro | Baptiste Heidrich | May 10, 2019 |
Pat-Pat discovers that her magic box is broken, and without it, she can not do her magic show, so Noddy has to find a way to get it to open.
| 79 | 27 | "The Case of the Bird That Can't Fly" | Albert Pereira-Lazaro | Gerard Foster | September 11, 2019 |
Noddy finds a bird that does not want to fly and tries to find out why.
| 80 | 28 | "The Case of the Missing Smartysaurus" | Albert Pereira-Lazaro | Simon Lecocq | September 11, 2019 |
Children's animated series with the little wooden boy and his friend. Noddy invites all his friends to look at the stars through his telescope.
| 81 | 29 | "The Case of the Silent Parrot" | Albert Pereira-Lazaro | Jawad Wachill | September 13, 2019 |
The Pirate Captain is worried when Scurvy the parrot stops talking - and without him telling them where to go, the pirates will not be able to go treasure hunting any more.
| 82 | 30 | "The Case of the Vanished Ninjas" | Albert Pereira-Lazaro | Andrew Viner | September 13, 2019 |
After Pat-Pat decorates the Ninjas with glitter, they don't turn up for an acrobatics rehearsal.
| 83 | 31 | "The Case of the Missing Suitcase" | Albert Pereira-Lazaro | Rachel Dawson | September 17, 2019 |
Pat-Pat is packing for a sleepover at the palace when her suitcase goes missing, so Noddy sets out to find out where it is.
| 84 | 32 | "The Case of the Two Parties" | Albert Pereira-Lazaro | Simon Lecocq | September 17, 2019 |
Children's animated series with the little wooden boy and his friend. The Naughticorns and the Pirates have a party at the same time.
| 85 | 33 | "The Case of the Knight's Patrol" | Albert Pereira-Lazaro | Anastasia Heinzl | September 20, 2019 |
The Knights set off on their patrol but are delayed by someone playing tricks on them.
| 86 | 34 | "The Case of the Deltoid's Challenge" | Albert Pereira-Lazaro | Hélène Sauvagnat | September 20, 2019 |
Noddy helps Deltoid beat the Ninja's challenge to run around the loop-the-loop.
| 87 | 35 | "The Case of the Pockets' Present" | Albert Pereira-Lazaro | Gerard Foster | September 24, 2019 |
Fuse asks Noddy to take a present to the Pockets, but when he gets there, the box is suddenly empty.
| 88 | 36 | "The Case of the Messed-Up Painting" | Albert Pereira-Lazaro | Anastasia Heinzl | September 24, 2019 |
Queen Sparklewings paints a picture that she intends to use in her story-time - but somebody ruins it.
| 89 | 37 | "The Case of the Delayed Repairs" | Albert Pereira-Lazaro | Andrew Viner | September 26, 2019 |
A group of builders get to work fixing the railway lines all over Toyland - only to discover that all their tools have gone missing.
| 90 | 38 | "The Case of Fuse's New Game" | Albert Pereira-Lazaro | Gerard Foster | September 26, 2019 |
Fuse invites his friends over to play his new computer game only for their fun to be ruined by a sudden power cut.
| 91 | 39 | "The Case of the Runaway Treasure Chest" | Albert Pereira-Lazaro | Simon Lecocq | September 27, 2019 |
Children's animated series with the little wooden boy and his friend. The Pirates are mystified when a treasure chest runs away.
| 92 | 40 | "The Case of the Broken Pulley" | Albert Pereira-Lazaro and Fabien Lemaître | Dodine Grimaldi | September 27, 2019 |
The head builder finds his equipment does not work and asks Noddy to help him find out who has been messing around with it.
| 93 | 41 | "The Case of the Missing Players" | Albert Pereira-Lazaro and Fabien Lemaître | Rachel Dawson | December 19, 2019 |
The Toyland football match can not go ahead because Pat Pat and Deltoid have not turned up.
| 94 | 42 | "The Case of the Empty Store" | Albert Pereira-Lazaro and Fabien Lemaître | Gerard Foster | December 19, 2019 |
Carlton organises the builders' parade, but all the supplies in the Brickabuild Store go missing.
| 95 | 43 | "The Case of the Changed Basketball Hoop" | Albert Pereira-Lazaro and Fabien Lemaître | Baptiste Heidrich | February 23, 2020 |
Noddy is about to play a game of basketball with Big Ears and Deltoid, but the hoop has been tampered with.
| 96 | 44 | "The Case of the Big Pile of Cabbages" | Albert Pereira-Lazaro and Fabien Lemaître | Mathilde Maraninchi and Antonin Poirée | February 23, 2020 |
Noddy has an invitation from Queen Sparklewings to give to Smartysaurus, but a big pile of cabbages is blocking the front door.
| 97 | 45 | "The Case of the Frozen Toys" | Albert Pereira-Lazaro and Fabien Lemaître | Gerard Foster | March 1, 2020 |
When they go to see the Queen's magic crystal collection, Noddy and Big Ears arrive at the Fairy Castle to find all the toys there are frozen like statues.
| 98 | 46 | "The Case of the Farmer Tom's Ruined Crops" | Albert Pereira-Lazaro and Fabien Lemaître | Mathilde Maraninchi and Antonin Poirée | March 1, 2020 |
Farmer Tom is upset when he finds his trees and corn knocked over, wondering whether there is any connection to the strange heavy bags scattered all over the farm or Smartysaurus's new hot-air balloon.
| 99 | 47 | "The Case of the Queen's Special Gift" | Albert Pereira-Lazaro and Fabien Lemaître | Gerard Foster | March 8, 2020 |
The knights have been traveling around Toyland, and they have all brought the queen back a present. One of them has forgotten, so Noddy helps him to find a gift.
| 100 | 48 | "The Case of the Pirates' Missing Treasure" | Albert Pereira-Lazaro and Fabien Lemaître | Simon Lecocq | March 8, 2020 |
Queen Sparklewings asks the Pirate Captain to open the Queen's dance with her. When it's time to practice, the Captain can not come because someone has stolen their treasure.
| 101 | 49 | "The Case of the Diablo" | Albert Pereira-Lazaro and Fabien Lemaître | Marie Garcias | March 13, 2020 |
Noddy's new diablo crashes and breaks in two. Even worse, when he tries to retrieve the two halves, he finds they are both missing.
| 102 | 50 | "The Case of the Vanished Trophy" | Albert Pereira-Lazaro and Fabien Lemaître | Baptiste Heidrich | March 13, 2020 |
Queen Sparklewings invites the toys to play a game of Grab the Flag at the castle. However, when the special trophy goes missing, the game is canceled, prompting Noddy to investigate.
| 103 | 51 | "The Case of the Lost Cows" | Albert Pereira-Lazaro and Fabien Lemaître | Hadrien Krasker and Mathieu Bouckenhove | March 22, 2020 |
Train hears cows near the railway tracks and insists on going slow in case he scares them, but the builders on board need to get to Brickabuild fast.
| 104 | 52 | "The Case of the Burst Tires" | Albert Pereira-Lazaro and Fabien Lemaître | Dodine Grimaldi | March 22, 2020 |
Deltoid's tricycle gets a burst tire before a big race, and he wonders if one of his rivals has sabotaged it.
| 105 | 53 | "The Special Case of the True Fairies" | Albert Pereira-Lazaro | Gerard Foster | March 22, 2020 |
Coco and Cleo must prove that they are true fairies by passing three challenges, with only Noddy, Revs, and Bumpy to help them.
| 106 | 54 | "The Special Case of the Fabulous Toyland Treasure" | Albert Pereira-Lazaro | Anastasia Heinzl and Albert Pereira-Lazaro | March 22, 2020 |
The pirates set off with an ancient map in search of the Fabulous Toyland Treasure, but their arch-rival Tina the Terrible arrives with a secret weapon of her own.
| 107 | 55 | "The Special Case of Deltoid's Day" | Albert Pereira-Lazaro | Gerard Foster | March 22, 2020 |
It's Deltoid's Day in Toyland, but his celebration gets interrupted due to a haywire robot stealing his ruby gem.

== Broadcast ==
In France, the series premiered on March 26, 2016, on the France Télévisions's platform Zouzous, and it aired on April 2, 2016, on France 5. In the United Kingdom, the series premiered on April 18, 2016, on the Channel 5's block Milkshake!. In the United States, the series aired on Universal Kids from 2016 until 2020 and is also available on Netflix. In Australia, the series airs on ABC Kids. In Brazil, the series airs on Gloobinho. In Spain, the series airs on Clan, tvG2, Super3, ETB 3 and À Punt. In Portugal, it airs on Canal Panda. In Italy, On Rai Yoyo and in Germany, On Super RTL

The series is also available for streaming on iTunes, Hulu, DreamWorks GO and YouTube.
