= Make Way for Noddy =

American-British animated series

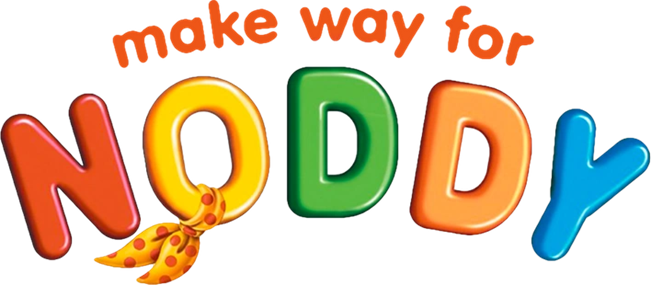
- Genre: Comedy; Musical
- Based on: Noddy's Toyland Adventures by Cosgrove Hall Films; Classic Noddy works and characters of Enid Blyton
- Directed by: Byron Vaughns
- Presented by: Naomi Wilkinson (US)
- Voices of: David A. Kaye; Britt McKillip; Michael Dobson; Tabitha St. Germain; Richard Newman; Lee Tockar; Doug Parker; Don Brown; Kathleen Barr; Ian James Corlett
- Narrated by: Michael Donovan (US); Regine Candler (UK)
- Theme music composer: Steven Bernstein; Julie Bernstein
- Opening theme: "Make Way for Noddy" theme
- Composers: Score: Steven Bernstein; Julie Bernstein; Original Songs: Steven Bernstein; Julie Bernstein; Lorraine Feather; Larry Grossman; Music Direction: Sharon Sampson; Terry Sampson
- Countries of origin: United States; United Kingdom
- Original language: English
- No. of seasons: 2
- No. of episodes: 100 (list of episodes)

Production
- Executive producers: Paul Sabella; Jonathan Dern; Carolyn Monroe; Mallory Lewis; Bradley Hood
- Producers: Robert Winthrop; Byron Vaughns
- Editor: Jymn Magon
- Running time: 11 minutes (UK); 30 minutes (US)
- Production companies: SD Entertainment (Note: Animation outsourced to Wang Film Productions); Chorion

Original release
- Network: PBS Kids (United States); Channel 5/Five (Milkshake!) (United Kingdom)
- Release: 2 September 2002 – 7 April 2006

Related
- Noddy's Toyland Adventures; Noddy in Toyland; Noddy, Toyland Detective

Make Way for Noddy (stylized as make way for NODDY), also known as simply Noddy, is an animated television series based on the Noddy character by English children's author Enid Blyton. It was broadcast with British English dub on Channel 5 (later known as Five; in twelve minute segments and as part of the Milkshake! programme) from 2 September 2002 to 7 April 2006. It features music and songs composed by Steven Bernstein and Julie Bernstein, along with Larry Grossman and Lorraine Feather, with the musical direction done by Sharon Sampson and Terry Sampson.

== Premise ==
The series changed its format in some ways from previous incarnations of Noddy to take advantage of the CGI medium and to appeal to more contemporary audiences, such as Noddy now also being able to fly a plane as part of his taxi duties and making Master Tubby Bear a more believable character. However it largely stuck to what the franchise established prior-hand. In addition to the franchise's characters, Make Way for Noddy also introduced actual children voicing the younger characters of the series.

== Characters ==
- Noddy (voiced by David A. Kaye/Alberto Ghisi in the US and Martin Skews/Edward Chun in the UK) is the protagonist of the series. Noddy is an imaginative wooden boy who lives in Toyland. Although Noddy is characterised as a child, he also serves as the main taxi driver. He sometimes begins nodding uncontrollably, such as after sneezing, and has to physically stop himself from nodding.
- Big Ears (voiced by Michael Dobson in the US and Pavel Douglas in the UK) is a garden gnome (although he is a brownie in the original books) who is Noddy's best friend and father figure. He serves as a mentor to Noddy and the other toys with astute knowledge and a fine sense-of-humour. His catchphrase is "You funny little Noddy!".
- PC Plod (voiced by Richard Newman in both US and UK and sometimes Pavel Douglas in the UK) is Toyland's sole policeman who is persistent for maintaining a certain order, but means quite well and whose catchphrase is "Halt in the name of Plod!"
- Tessie Bear (voiced by Britt McKillip in the US and Joanna Ruiz in the UK) is a female teddy bear who is always ready to try something new and help everyone she sees.
- Dinah Doll (voiced by Tabitha St. Germain in the US and Andrea Harris in the UK) is a Toytown shopkeeper and a big sibling support figure to Noddy.
- Bumpy Dog (voiced by Felix McCabe) is Tessie Bear's extremely playful but loyal and sensitive dog.
- Sly and Gobbo (voiced by Doug Parker and Don Brown in the US and Ben Small and John Telfer in the UK) are two goblins who serve as the series' antagonists. Sly is the more airheaded and curious one, while Gobbo is the more conniving and intelligent of the two members. Gobbo is the dominant of the two, and Sly frequently laments that Gobbo always has all of the fun.
- Mr. Sparks (voiced by Lee Tockar in the US and John Telfer in the UK) is Toyland's street-smart Scottish-accented mechanic.
- Miss Pink Cat (voiced by Tabitha St. Germain in the US and in the UK and Carrie Mullan in the UK) is the pessimistic and sophisticated French-accented owner of Toytown's ice cream shop.
- Master Tubby Bear (voiced by Manny Petruzzelli in the US and Carrie Mullan in the UK) is a young teddy bear whose role was changed from a tricky mummy's boy (in previous incarnations) to a moody but lovable anti-idol kid in this series, though this was clearly done as it lent more to having him involved in stories, this time in noticeable contrast as a boy hero to Noddy.
- Martha Monkey (voiced by Kathleen Barr in the US and Joanna Ruiz in the UK) is a stuffed monkey with an energetic but bossy tomboy personality.
- Mr. Jumbo (voiced by Ian James Corlett in the US and Felix McCabe in the UK) is a mild-mannered stuffed elephant.
- Clockwork Mouse (voiced by Kathleen Barr in the US and Joanna Ruiz in the UK) is a perky wind-up toy mouse who is sometimes feeling dwarfed by the other inhabitants of Toyland for his size.
- Mr. Wobblyman (voiced by Ian James Corlett in the US and Ben Small in the UK) is a roly-poly toy who is always diligent about doing the right thing.
- Clockwork Clown (voiced by Ian James Corlett in the US and Ben Small in the UK) is a toy clown who stands on his hands due to having only one foot.
- Mr. Train Driver (voiced by Ian James Corlett in the US and Ben Small in the UK) is a train driver who drives the Toyland Express train.
- The Skittles (voiced by Teryl Rothery and Chantal Strand in the US and Joanna Ruiz, Carrie Johnston and Ben Small in the UK) are a family of orderly bowling pins.
- Harvey (voiced by Lee Tockar in the US and Ben Small in the UK) and Cecilia (voiced by Cathy Weseluck in the US and Joanna Ruiz in the UK) are two beetles.
- The Bouncing Balls (voiced by Cathy Weseluck, Jesse Moss, Michael Donovan and Sage Testini in the US and Carrie Mullan, Joanna Ruiz, Ben Small and Emma Tate in the UK) are the group of balls that are bouncing all over the Toyland, the littlest of them is Tiny Ball.

=== Guest characters ===
- Santa Claus (voiced by Michael Donovan in the US and Pavel Douglas in the UK) is the traditional figure associated with Christmas, who delivers presents to good boys and girls. He appears in "Noddy Saves Christmas".
- Marlo Moon (voiced by Lee Tockar in the US and Ben Small in the UK) is a man who lives on the moon who catches a cold, and Noddy makes him feel better. He appears in "Noddy and the Magical Moondust".
- Whiz the Robot (voiced by Matt Hill in the US and Justin Fletcher in the UK)

=== Unseen ===
- The Narrator (voiced by Michael Donovan in the US and Regine Candler in the UK) is an unseen voice who reads at the beginning in every episode.

== Production ==
=== Development ===
The series was first announced to be in production in October 2000, with 100 11-minute episodes and a feature-length Christmas special announced to be in production for a 2001 delivery. In January 2001, SD Entertainment were announced to be producers on the series and they announced it would be their first project.

=== Soundtrack ===
The soundtrack was composed by Steven and Julie Bernstein with additional songs by Larry Grossman and Lorraine Feather, with Terry and Sharon Sampson directing the music and the cast of the TV show Kidsongs performing the theme song and the music video segments for the series.

=== Distribution ===
On 14 June 2001, BBC Worldwide pre-sold the series to RTP in Portugal. Initially, BBC Worldwide planned to distribute the series internationally until Chorion decided to self-distribute on their own. Portuguese licensing instead went over to Biplano and Editorial Verbo.

On 17 December 2001, Chorion announced additional pre-sales, with TVOntario in Canada, Alter Channel in Greece (Nextworks acquiring home video distribution), France 5 in France, Rai YoYo in Italy and Hop! Channel in Israel (with LDI as the franchise's local licensing representative) acquiring the show. BBC Worldwide's Australian branch pre-sold the series to Nickelodeon and TVNZ (for 50 episodes) in Australia and New Zealand respectively. BBC Worldwide also held licensing rights in Indian territories and pre-sold the series to Cartoon Network in 2004.

Channel 5 acquired the UK broadcast rights to the series in the summer of 2002 for a broadcast within the fall schedule. In June 2002, Universal Pictures Video acquired UK video rights to the series from Chorion.

In January 2005, Chorion announced that FUNimation Productions would hold licensing and home video rights to the series in North America.

=== Say It with Noddy ===
A spin-off interstitial series, Say It with Noddy, aired as part of the main show in the US and as a separate program in the UK. It featured Noddy learning various foreign language words (Spanish, French, Swahili, Urdu and Mandarin; Russian was used in lieu of Urdu for the US dub) from a robot named Whizz (voiced by Matt Hill in the US and Justin Fletcher in the UK).

== American version ==
In 2005, the series premiered in the United States on PBS Kids. As PBS lacks commercials, a half hour formatted version was made, which were envisioned to feature two existing twelve-minute episodes from the show, two Say It with Noddy segments, a music video, and wrap-around segments featuring British television presenter Naomi Wilkinson from Milkshake! who appeared sitting in a themed studio, introducing the respective theme of the episode.

PBS originally acquired US broadcast rights in October 2004. In the US, the series aired from 11 September 2005 to 15 June 2007, with reruns continuing through June 2010, and later reran on NBC and PBS Kids Sprout in the US until September 2015. As of 2022, the series is available to stream on Peacock.

== Episodes ==
=== Season 1 (2002) ===
No. overall	No. in series	UK title (top) US title (bottom)	Air date (UK)	Air date (US)
1	1	"Too Many Noddies"	2 September 2002	26 February 2006
When wanting to have fun, Noddy uses Big Ears's spell to duplicate himself.
2	2	"Noddy and the New Taxi"	3 September 2002	12 February 2006
Sly and Gobbo set up a rival taxi business forcing Noddy off the road.
3	3	"Noddy and the Magic Bagpipes"	4 September 2002	16 October 2005
Noddy wants to learn to play the bagpipes, so he borrows a pair of magic bagpipes from Big Ears, but the bagpipes run away when Noddy doesn't play them.
4	4	"Noddy Has a Visitor"	5 September 2002	24 December 2006
Martha Monkey stays at Noddy's and forces him to be nice to her because she's his visitor.
5	5	"Noddy's Perfect Gift"	6 September 2002	2 October 2005
Noddy wants to find the perfect gift for Tessie Bear's birthday.
6	6	"Noddy's Lucky Day"	9 September 2002	8 January 2006
Mr. Sparks's newest invention tells Noddy that tomorrow will be his lucky day, but it doesn't seem that his invention is right the next morning.
7	7	"Policeman for a Day"	10 September 2002	16 October 2005
Mr. Plod gives Noddy the job of putting up posters around the town (along with his official policeman's badge). However Noddy starts taking advantage of his job and causes trouble.
8	8	"Bounce Alert in Toyland"	11 September 2002	2 April 2006
Bouncing balls come to Toytown and play, but Gobbo and Sly capture them.
9	9	"Tickled Pink"	12 September 2002	17 December 2006
Noddy puts a spell on himself to make others laugh to his jokes, but everyone who hears him becomes pink in the face and starts laughing uncontrollably. With a little help of Martha Monkey, she tells him that he is not really funny at all, which makes the spell off of him, and the pink toys turn back to normal.
10	10	"Noddy's Pet Chicken"	13 September 2002	13 November 2005
Noddy finds a chicken and takes it as his pet.
11	11	"Noddy Goes Shopping"	16 September 2002	1 January 2006
Big Ears can't sleep so he sends Noddy to bring him the things he needs to fall asleep.
12	12	"Hold on to your Hat, Noddy!"	17 September 2002	25 September 2005
Noddy and Tessie Bear organize a party for Big Ears, but the wind takes them up into the air while driving to it.
13	13	"Toy Town's Winning Team"	18 September 2002	19 March 2006
Noddy wants Mr. Wobblyman to join their football team.
14	14	"Noddy and the Bumper Monster"	19 September 2002	5 March 2006
Mr. Plod tells Noddy a scary story. When Noddy believes it, Martha Monkey makes him believe that the monster's chasing him.
15	15	"The Magic Powder"	20 September 2002	1 October 2006
Sly and Gobbo give everyone in town a powder that causes them to dance along to their music box unable to stop. Bumpy Dog comes to the rescue.
16	16	"A Bike for Big Ears"	23 September 2002	17 September 2006
Noddy destroys Big Ears's bike. He takes it to Mr. Sparks to fix it and gives it a special engine that gives Big-Ears a nasty shock.
17	17	"Noddy and the Voice of Plod"	24 September 2002	31 December 2006
Noddy helps Mr. Plod with his policeman job after making him lose his voice.
18	18	"Master Tubby's Opposite Day"	25 September 2002	7 January 2007
Master Tubby Bear says everything he means in opposites which causes confusion for everyone in Toyland.
19	19	"Don't Be Scared Noddy"	26 September 2002	1 October 2006
Noddy thinks that there are monsters in his house.
20	20	"The Goblin's Stopwatch"	27 September 2002	12 March 2006
Sly and Gobbo find a stopwatch that stops time.
21	21	"Mr. Sparks and the Broken Clock"	30 September 2002	20 November 2005
Toytown's clock is broken and Mr. Sparks has problems with fixing it.
22	22	"Noddy's on the Move"	1 October 2002	29 October 2006
With Master Tubby's help, Noddy tries to move.
23	23	"The Flower Thief"	2 October 2002	11 September 2005
Noddy grows ten roses for Tessie Bear that start mysteriously disappearing.
24	24	"Noddy and the Treasure Map"	3 October 2002	5 November 2006
Gobbo and Sly give Noddy a treasure map.
25	25	"Mr. Plod and the Jail Bird"	4 October 2002	25 December 2005
Mr. Plod locks the Toytown rooster in jail for being too noisy. The next morning, the rooster doesn't crow and there's no sunrise.
26	26	"A Grey Day in Toyland"	7 October 2002	19 November 2006
A grey cloud makes all the colour in Toytown disappear.
27	27	"Noddy's Car Trouble"	8 October 2002	5 March 2006
Noddy argues with his car causing it to run away from him.
28	28	"Bumpy Dog's Day"	9 October 2002	3 December 2006
Bumpy Dog is causing trouble all over Toytown.
29	29	"The Out-of-Control Tower"	10 October 2002	6 November 2005
A tower that is supposed to control the weather flies away with Master Tubby Bear and Martha Monkey inside, so Mr. Sparks must find a way to save them.
30	30	"Noddy and the Naughty Box"	11 October 2002	21 January 2007
Noddy must deliver a box that plays jokes on others.
31	31	"Skittle in the Middle"	14 October 2002	22 January 2006
One skittle gets tired of just falling over every day, but he's afraid to tell his family about it.
32	32	"Googleberry Moon"	15 October 2002	11 September 2005
The toys of Toytown go and pick googleberries, but they're stolen by Sly and Gobbo.
33	33	"Noddy's Wake Up Call"	16 October 2002	5 November 2006
Noddy tries to find a way to wake up early after his alarm clock breaks because he has an important job to do in the morning.
34	34	"Miss Pink Cat's Country Adventure"	17 October 2002	16 April 2006
Miss Pink Cat must get milk so she can make ice cream in her parlour, but she doesn't know where milk comes from so Noddy helps her.
35	35	"The Big Sneeze"	18 October 2002	25 December 2005
Sly and Gobbo put a sneezing spell on Mr. Jumbo by accident, he sneezes so hard that he ends up in the air.
36	36	"The Magic Rubber"	21 October 2002	26 February 2006
36	36	"The Magic Eraser"	21 October 2002	26 February 2006
Master Tubby Bear takes a magic eraser that can erase everything after it falls from Big Ears's package. Later, Sly and Gobbo steal the eraser from him and wreak havoc.
37	37	"Dinah's Day Out"	22 October 2002	9 October 2006
Dinah Doll and Tessie Bear go to get more things for Dinah's store, but it triggers panic among others because they can't get anything until Dinah returns.
38	38	"Catch a Falling Star"	23 October 2002	24 September 2006
Noddy, Tessie Bear and Martha Monkey go camping, they save a star that fell from the sky called Twinkly. Sly and Gobbo steal the star and it's a race against time to get it back up into the sky before sunrise.
39	39	"Driving Miss Pink Cat"	24 October 2002	29 October 2006
After Miss Pink Cat offers him as many ice creams as he can eat, Noddy starts driving her everywhere she wants to go.
40	40	"Noddy's Clothes on the Loose"	25 October 2002	10 December 2006
Gobbo and Sly put a spell on Noddy's clothes, giving them orders, so everyone now thinks that Noddy's a thief.
41	41	"Fire Chief Dinah"	28 October 2002	12 November 2006
Mr. Plod organizes Toytown's fire brigade, making Dinah the chief.
42	42	"Goblin Good Deed Day"	29 October 2002	22 January 2006
Sly and Gobbo try to do a good deed for Goblin Good Deed Day.
43	43	"Noddy, the Best Driver in the World"	30 October 2002	8 October 2006
Noddy must give Martha Monkey flying lessons if he doesn't drive eight different vehicles before sunset.
44	44	"The Great Goblin Giveaway"	31 October 2002	15 January 2006
Sly makes presents from his and Gobbo's old junk, labels them to everyone in Toyland and leaves them at the train station for Noddy to pick up.
45	45	"Noddy the Rainbow Chaser"	1 November 2002	18 September 2005
Noddy and Master Tubby Bear take gold from the end of the rainbow, making it disappear.
46	46	"Above It All"	4 November 2002	17 December 2006
Sly and Gobbo ride a cloud over Toytown and steal the two ice-creams from Noddy and Tessie Bear.
47	47	"Noddy and the Magic Sound Cups"	5 November 2002	7 January 2007
47	47	"Noddy and the Criss Cross Cups"	5 November 2002	7 January 2007
Sly and Gobbo give Noddy magic sound cups so he'll sing like a bird. Bumpy Dog takes them, causing trouble in Toytown.
48	48	"Mr. Plod's Little Problem"	6 November 2002	22 October 2006
Mr. Plod is shrunk to the size of a beetle by accident.
49	49	"Noddy and the Towering Flower"	7 November 2002	30 October 2005
Noddy and Master Tubby Bear want to compete in the flower contest against Tessie Bear and Dinah Doll. They forget to seed their flower, so they take a gigantic one from the town square.
50	50	"The Great Goblin Switch"	8 November 2002	21 January 2007
Sly and Gobbo change themselves into Noddy and Tessie Bear after seeing how nice others are to them.

=== Season 2 (2003) ===
No. overall	No. in series	UK title (top) US title (bottom)	Air date (UK)	Air date (US)
51	1	"The Case of the Missing Ball"	28 July 2003	20 November 2005
The toys must find Tiny Ball after he disappears into the sky.
52	2	"The Great Train Chase"	29 July 2003	17 September 2006
Master Tubby sneakily drives the Toytown train, but he doesn't know how to stop it causing it to run off the rails.
53	3	"A Surprise for Tessie Bear"	30 July 2003	26 November 2006
Tessie Bear feels sad after she popped her balloon. One morning, a mysterious giant present appears in the square.
54	4	"Clockwork Mouse's Wish"	31 July 2003	23 October 2005
Clockwork Mouse uses Mr. Jumbo's growing formula to enlarge himself.
55	5	"Master Tubby's Chocolate Dream"	1 August 2003	25 September 2005
Master Tubby Bear eats all of the chocolate that Noddy delivered for Chocolate Day and has a bad dream when he falls asleep.
56	6	"What Strange Weather"	4 August 2003	9 April 2006
The wind whisks a barrel of milk and a basket of eggs into the air, causing it to rain milk and eggs.
57	7	"Forgive Me Not"	5 August 2003	9 April 2006
Martha Monkey is angry with Noddy after he forgets to invite her to his party.
58	8	"Bicycle Battle"	6 August 2003	18 December 2005
The toys compete in a bicycle race. Martha Monkey wrecks her bike so has to share one with Noddy, much to his annoyance.
59	9	"Lie Down, Mr. Wobblyman"	7 August 2003	12 November 2006
Tessie Bear and Noddy want to make Mr. Wobblyman lie down.
60	10	"Noddy's Car Loses Its Voice"	8 August 2003	14 January 2007
While driving, Noddy hits a bump in the road causing his car's horn to get lost.
61	11	"Noddy Through the Looking Glass"	11 August 2003	27 November 2005
Noddy is transported to a parallel universe by Big Ears' magic mirror.
62	12	"Mr. Plod in Jail"	12 August 2003	8 October 2006
Mr. Plod accidentally locks himself in jail.
63	13	"Goblins Above"	13 August 2003	11 December 2005
Sly and Gobbo steal Noddy's plane.
64	14	"Noddy and the Big Chicken Roundup"	14 August 2003	24 September 2006
Chickens follow Noddy into town when a bag of chicken feed in the back of his car is ripped open and leaves a trail.
65	15	"Master Tubby Goblin"	15 August 2003	6 September 2006
Gobbo and Sly teach Master Tubby Bear how to be a goblin.
66	16	"Just Be Yourself Noddy"	18 August 2003	15 October 2006
Noddy pretends to be Mr. Wobblyman and Mr. Jumbo to impress Tessie Bear.
67	17	"The Goblins and the Invisible Paint"	19 August 2003	18 September 2005
Sly and Gobbo give Mr. Sparks a charm that will make more money for him, and if it works, they'll get half of that money. Then they use invisible paint to make Noddy wreck his car to ensure he earns some.
68	18	"Don't Be Late, Noddy"	20 August 2003	10 September 2006
Noddy drives through Toyland to reach the train station and pick up Mrs. Skittle, but a fallen tree blocking the road and an accident in the lake almost makes him late.
69	19	"Noddy and the Broken Plates"	21 August 2003	23 October 2005
69	19	"Noddy and the Broken Dishes"	21 August 2003	23 October 2005
Sly and Gobbo trick Noddy with a bunch of broken plates.
70	20	"Noddy the Artist"	22 August 2003	10 December 2006
Noddy tries to be a painter.
71	21	"Noddy's Special Treat"	25 August 2003	19 November 2006
Martha Monkey and Mr. Jumbo want Noddy to take them on a trip.
72	22	"Noddy Builds a Rocketship"	26 August 2003	13 November 2005
Noddy and Master Tubby Bear are building a rocketship.
73	23	"Mr. Plod, the Best Policeman"	27 August 2003	9 October 2005
Noddy hides his car and tells Mr. Plod that it was stolen, so Mr. Plod will solve a big case and that he ends up in the newspaper.
74	24	"No Nap for Noddy"	28 August 2003	1 January 2006
Noddy stays up during the night after seeing Mr. Sparks up late but becomes really tired during the day which causes problems when delivering packages.
75	25	"Big Ears for a Day"	29 August 2003	10 September 2006
Noddy and Big Ears switch jobs for one day.
76	26	"Noddy Loses His Bell"	1 September 2003	4 December 2005
Noddy has lost the bell on his hat and after looking all over town Big Ears suggests that he retraces his steps.
77	27	"Up, Up and Away"	2 September 2003	15 January 2006
Martha Monkey gets carried away when she buys two big bunches of balloons in order to attract new friends, but she learns a valuable lesson.
78	28	"The Big Fib"	3 September 2003	19 March 2006
Noddy lies about eating a whole box of Googleberries while looking after Dinah Doll's stall. He convinces the entire town that a monster has eaten them all.
79	29	"Noddy's Family Tree"	4 September 2003	27 November 2005
Mr. Jumbo and Clockwork Mouse wanted to show Noddy and Tessie Bear some beautiful scrapbooks.
80	30	"The Listening Game"	5 September 2003	19 February 2006
When everyone else in Toytown is too busy to play with him, Dinah Doll teaches Noddy a game he can play on his own.
81	31	"Noddy and the Curious Package"	8 September 2003	15 October 2006
Noddy is delivering a package but he doesn't know what it contains. Noddy's curiosity gets the better of him and he tries to work out what exactly is in the package, ruining the contents in the process.
82	32	"Shelf Help"	9 September 2003	11 December 2005
Big Ears teaches Noddy how to be more self-reliant.
83	33	"Good Neighbour Noddy"	10 September 2003	12 February 2006
Noddy helps a friend.
84	34	"Noddy Needs Some Medicine"	11 September 2003	16 April 2006
Noddy has a bad cold, but Sly and Gobbo persuade him that his medicine Dinah Doll bought will have awful side effects.
85	35	"Noddy and the Funny Pictures"	12 September 2003	24 December 2006
Martha Monkey gets a new camera so she can take some embarrassing photos of Noddy.
86	36	"Noddy Gets Lost"	15 September 2003	26 March 2006
Noddy refuses to take directions from Tessie Bear and gets lost.
87	37	"Master Tubby's Name Game"	16 September 2003	8 January 2006
Master Tubby Bear likes thinking up cruel games for everyone, but he doesn't like it when the tables are turned on him.
88	38	"Noddy Helps Out"	17 September 2003	2 October 2005
Noddy promised to help all his friends, but he is soon tired, and realises that he has bitten off more than he can chew.
89	39	"Noddy and the Lost Tool"	18 September 2003	30 October 2005
Noddy learns a valuable lesson about other people's property when he loses a tool he borrowed from Mr. Sparks without his permission.
90	40	"Noddy's Great Discovery"	19 September 2003	26 March 2006
Noddy finds some money in the street, but should he spend it?
91	41	"Noddy Has a Difficult Day"	22 September 2003	3 December 2006
Sly and Gobbo take advantage of Noddy and con him into giving them free rides until he runs out of fuel.
92	42	"Noddy Can Fix It"	23 September 2003	13 November 2005
Noddy's car has broken, but he is sure that he can fix it all by himself.
93	43	"Bumpy Dog's Visit"	24 September 2003	4 December 2005
Noddy takes care of Bumpy Dog.
94	44	"The Toy Town Parade"	25 September 2003	19 February 2006
When the Toy Town residents can't decide who will go first in their annual parade, Big Ears steps in and sorts everything out.
95	45	"Noddy's House of Cards"	26 September 2003	14 January 2007
Noddy builds a house of cards for Big Ears, but disaster strikes when he takes it over to his friend.
96	46	"Martha Monkey's Banana Pie"	29 September 2003	2 April 2006
Martha Monkey wants to take revenge on Noddy for spoiling her banana pie.
97	47	"Noddy and the Skittles"	30 September 2003	31 December 2006
Noddy wants to fly his kite, but is hindered by skittles.
98	48	"The Balancing Act"	1 October 2003	12 March 2006
Mr. Jumbo and Clockwork Mouse are working on an act for the town parade, and Noddy helps them to practise.
99	49	"Noddy and the Missing Muffins"	2 October 2003	22 October 2006
When some googleberry muffins are stolen, Noddy helps a bumbling Mr. Plod to find the thieves.
100	50	"The Tell-Tale Bell"	3 October 2003	18 December 2005
In order to help Noddy tell right from wrong, Big Ears enchants the bell on his hat, making it ring whenever he is about to do wrong.

=== Specials (2004–06) ===
No.	Title	Year
101	"Noddy Saves Christmas"	13 July 2004
It's Christmas Eve in Toyland
102	"Noddy and the Island Adventure"	24 October 2005
Noddy and all of Toytown are taking a trip to the beach.
103	"Noddy and the Magical Moondust"	7 April 2006
The Toyland Fair has come
