= William de Warenne =

William de Warenne may refer to:

- William de Warenne, 1st Earl of Surrey (died 1088)
- William de Warenne, 2nd Earl of Surrey (died 1138)
- William de Warenne, 3rd Earl of Surrey (1119–1148)
- William de Warenne, 5th Earl of Surrey (1166–1240)
- William de Warenne (1256-1286) (1256–1286), only son and heir apparent to John de Warenne, 6th Earl of Surrey
- William de Warenne (justice) (died 1209), justice of the Curia Regis
- Sir William de Warenne, character in The Castle
