= Noddy (character) =

Fictional character

- Noddy character
- Noddy and Mr. Plod in Noddy's car, as depicted in the 2000s TV production Make Way for Noddy.
- First appearance: Noddy Goes to Toyland
- Created by: Enid Blyton
- Designed by: Harmsen van der Beek
- Voiced by: Denise Bryer (1955–1969; The Adventures Of Noddy and His Master's Voice); Kathryn Beaumont (1963; Noddy Goes to Toyland); Pat Kerr (1971–1972; audio adaptations of Noddy Wins a Prize/Noddy and the Aeroplane and Noddy Goes To School/Noddy Gets Into Trouble); Richard Briers (1975–1976, Noddy); Susan Sheridan (1992–2000; Noddy's Toyland Adventures); Catherine Disher (1998–2000; US/Canadian version); Martin Skews (2002, Make Way for Noddy); Teresa Gallagher (2009, Noddy in Toyland); Louis Ashbourne Serkis (2016–2020; UK version); Valin Shinyei (2016–2020; US version); Brigitte Lecordier (1992–2020; France); Aleksandra Rojewska (1992–2004; Poland); Yuko Mita (1992–2009; Japan)

In-universe information
- Species: Wooden toy
- Gender: Male
- Occupation: Taxi driver
- Nationality: English

Noddy is a character created by English children's author Enid Blyton. He is depicted as a wooden toy with a childlike view of the world. He resides in the fictional setting of Toyland, where he works as a taxi driver. Noddy is known for driving a yellow car with red fenders, and is depicted with a variety of supporting toy characters, including Big Ears, a brownie who is Noddy's best friend and Mr. Plod, the local policeman.

Noddy first appeared in a book series published between 1949 and 1963, illustrated by the Dutch artist Harmsen van der Beek from 1949 until his death in 1953, after which the work was continued by Mary Brooks, Robert Lee, Robert Tyndall and Peter Wienk. Television shows based on the character have run on British television since 1955.

== History ==
Noddy was conceived by Enid Blyton in response to a request from David White, of the publisher Sampson Low, Marston & Co. Ltd., to create a series of picture books which featured strong, central characters to rival the work of Walt Disney. Sheila Hodgetts had already had success with her series of Toby Twirl books. White was seeking an artist to collaborate with Blyton. While reviewing sample drawings submitted by an agent, he encountered a sheet illustrated by Dutch artist Harmsen van der Beek depicting what he later described as "fantastically lively little people" alongside small houses surrounded by bluebells that were "as proportionately big as trees." White was convinced that Harmsen was the perfect artist to work with Blyton that he arranged a meeting to be held immediately to help visualise her new character.

An interpreter was employed for Harmsen. White explained that they wanted to use Harmsen's distinctive toys, figures, houses and shops as the setting for a new series written by Blyton. After Blyton described the unnamed central character, whom she imagined emerging from Toyland, Harmsen sketched a small wooden toy wearing a long, bell-topped hat. Blyton said the drawing closely resembled the character she had envisioned. The meeting resulted in the development of several characters and the basic concept for the series. Four days after the meeting, Blyton sent the text of the first two Noddy books to her publisher, to be forwarded to van der Beek.

Noddy first appeared in the Sunday Graphic between 5 June and 31 July 1949, the same year as Blyton's first daily Noddy strip for the London Evening Standard. The second book, Hurrah for Little Noddy was the first to appear, followed by the first book Noddy Goes to Toyland, serialised from 7 August to 25 September 1949. In November that year Noddy Goes to Toyland, the first of at least two dozen books in the series, was published.

The Noddy books became one of Blyton's most successful and best-known series, and were hugely popular in the 1950s. Children were instantly attracted to van der Beek's illustrations and seemed to identify themselves with Noddy. An extensive range of sub-series, spin-offs and strip books was produced throughout the decade, including Noddy's Library, Noddy's Garage of Books, Noddy's Castle of Books, Noddy's Toy Station of Books and Noddy's Shop of Books. Until his death in 1953, Harmsen insisted on illustrating everything himself, the workload began to weigh him down. Harmsen confessed to David White that, at times, when he was working through into the early hours to meet a deadline, "Little Noddies" would appear from everywhere and crawl all over his desk.

The first television adaptation of Noddy called The Adventures of Noddy was first broadcast in 1955, which was narrated by Enid Blyton. The programme would also broadcast in German on ARD in 1963.

Kellogg's would acquire the rights to use Noddy on advertisements in 1955.

Noddy continued to be successful in the 1960s; by 1962, 26 million copies of Noddy had been sold. (Note: In 1960 alone, eleven Noddy books were published, including the strip books Noddy and the Runaway Wheel, Noddy's Bag of Money, and Noddy's Car Gets into Trouble.) In 1963, Noddy was featured in the animated short film Noddy Goes to Toyland, it was produced by Arthur Humberstone for Enid Blyton. Blyton concluded several of her long-running series in 1963. Blyton published her last book in the Noddy series, Noddy and the Aeroplane, in February 1964.

By the early 1960s, some 146 different companies were involved in merchandising Noddy alone. Bestime released the Little Noddy Car Game in 1953 and the Little Noddy Leap Frog Game in 1955, and in 1956 American manufacturer Parker Brothers released Little Noddy's Taxi Game, a board game which features Noddy driving about town, picking up various characters. Bestime released its Plywood Noddy Jigsaws series in 1957 and a Noddy jigsaw series featuring cards appeared from 1963, with illustrations by Robert Lee. Arrow Games became the chief producer of Noddy jigsaws in the late 1970s and early 1980s.

In 1975, another television adaptation simply titled Noddy was broadcast. It was produced and directed by Brian Cosgrove and Mark Hall under their company Stop Frame Productions and was narrated by Richard Briers. It broadcast on ITV from 1975 to 1976.

On 25 October 1982, Rupert Weekly, a comic magazine based on the character Rupert Bear was published by Marvel UK featuring Noddy.

In 1990s, Noddy began regaining popularity since his heyday of 1950s and 1960s, as in 1992, a Noddy television series produced by BBC Worldwide and Cosgrove Hall called Noddy's Toyland Adventures was broadcast on the Children's BBC, as well as a Noddy Magazine published by the BBC.

In January 1996, Trocadero PLC (later known as "Chorion Limited") acquired Darrell Waters Ltd., the holding company for the estate of children's author Enid Blyton for £14.6 million. They soon formed a new subsidiary - Enid Blyton Ltd. to handle all intellectual properties, character brands, and media in Blyton's works, including Noddy.

In 1997, Enid Blyton Ltd. decided to sell the Noddy archive in 1997. The first Noddy sale was held in October 1997c the second in November 1998 and the third in Sotheby's in London in April 2000.

In 1998, producer Rick Siggelkow brought Noddy into the North American market in a television series called The Noddy Shop, but with all of the live-action scenes filmed in Canada. Much like how Siggelkow introduced Thomas the Tank Engine & Friends to American audiences through Shining Time Station, the series incorporated footage from Noddy's Toyland Adventures re-dubbed with American accents. In its first season on PBS, the show was seen by an average of 2.5 million viewers per episode, higher than Sesame Street's average during the same year. Actor Jack Nicholson and Friends star Lisa Kudrow had their picture taken with Noddy at the Aids Paediatric event in New York, USA in June 1999.

By 1999, 200 million Noddy books had been sold in 27 languages. Noddy is known as "Oui Oui" in France, "Doddi" in Iceland, "Purzelknirps" in Germany and "Hilitos" in Spain.

A Noddy television series called Make Way for Noddy was first announced to be in production in October 2000, with 100 11-minute episodes and a feature-length Christmas special announced to be in production for a 2001 delivery. In January 2001, SD Entertainment were announced to be producers on the series and they announced it would be their first project. In May 2002, UK's Channel Five announced that it had commissioned 100 episodes of the series, airing in September of that year. The range of newly developed TV shows at Chorion began to expand internationally, with Noddy becoming the most recognised children's character in France in 2003 and sold to the Chinese market in 2004, and airing in the US on PBS Kids in 2005.

In 2005, a set of 100 new, two-minute TV interstitials were created by Chorion for Make way for Noddy. These interstitials, entitled Say it with Noddy, feature Noddy learning words in a variety of foreign languages. They also introduced Noddy's new friend Whizz from Robot Village, who presses a button on his chest to play recordings of native speakers saying the new foreign-language words can Noddy was to learn. The interstitials were featured on commercial breaks on UK's Five and featured as segments for the American airing of the show on PBS and now-defunct Universal Kids (formerly known as "Sprout").

Noddy, Big Ears, Mr. Plod, and several other characters from British children's literature appeared at the Children's Party at the Palace on 25 June 2006 in honour of the 80th birthday of Queen Elizabeth II. During the pantomime-style play called The Queen's Handbag, Noddy and Big Ears were portrayed by performers in mascot-style costumes, while Mr. Plod was played by actor Martin Clunes.

Blyton's granddaughter, Sophie Smallwood, wrote a new Noddy book to celebrate the character's 60th birthday, 46 years after the final book was published; Noddy and the Farmyard Muddle (2009) was illustrated by Robert Tyndall.

For the 60th anniversary, a CGI-animated series, called Noddy in Toyland, by Chorion and produced by Brown Bag Films in Ireland, was broadcast starting on 20 April 2009. This series incorporates Whizz from "Say it with Noddy" as a full-time character. Sly and Gobbo's cousins, Sneaky and Stealth, are introduced and sometimes work along with them. The full series is available digitally on iTunes (now as "Apple TV").

Other celebrations for the 60th anniversary included a museum exhibit of Noddy art in London in late 2008 and a stage show. The Noddy books were announced to be published China. Actress Sienna Miller and her fashion designer sister, Savannah, owners of the label Twenty8Twelve, unveiled a fashion collection inspired by Noddy and Big Ears at London Fashion Week in February 2009.

The 2009 biographical film Enid, which portrays the life of Enid Blyton, includes several references to the Noddy series. In one scene, Blyton is depicted typing the opening lines of the first Noddy book, Noddy Goes to Toyland. She is later shown reading the book to her second husband, Kenneth Darrell Waters. In the film's third act, a Noddy figurine appears on her desk, and in the final scene, both a poster for Noddy Goes to Toyland and the figurine are shown on a desk in a library setting.

After financial difficulties, Chorion sold its assets. On 7 March 2012, DreamWorks Classics (formerly Classic Media, now a subsidiary of DreamWorks Animation) purchased the Noddy and Olivia properties. Hachette UK purchased the rest of Enid Blyton's works with the exception of Noddy on 26 March 2012. As of 2012, Noddy had sold over 250 million books.

In 2016, a CGI-animated series, named Noddy, Toyland Detective was produced by French producer/distributor Gaumont Animation, in association with DreamWorks Animation Television, and in partnership with France Télévisions. It premiered on Channel Five's preschool block Milkshake! on 18 April 2016.

On 1 January 2024, the illustrations for the first seven Noddy books by Harmsen van der Beek entered the public domain.

== Character biography ==
The first book explains Noddy's origins. He is made by a woodcarver in a toy shop but runs away after the man begins to make a wooden lion, which scares Noddy. As he wanders through the woods naked, penniless, and homeless, he meets Big Ears, a friendly brownie. Big Ears decides that Noddy is a toy and takes him to live in Toyland. He generously provides Noddy with a set of clothing and a house. While Noddy is quite happy to be a toy, the citizens of Toyland are not sure that he actually is one. They put Noddy on trial and examine whether he is a toy or an ornament. Eventually, Noddy is declared a toy, but still has to convince the court that he is a good toy. The judge accepts that Noddy is good after a doll tells the court that he saved her little girl from a lion, and he is allowed to stay in Toyland. Noddy gets his car in the second book. It is given to him after he helps solve a local mystery.

The other toys can hear him coming by the distinctive "Parp Parp" sound of his car's horn and the jingle of the bell on his blue hat. Often he uses his car to visit all of the places in Toyland. When his taxi business is not doing so well, or when he needs help, Noddy turns to Big Ears. Big Ears will often lend him what he needs. On occasion, Noddy will allow people to make his head nod, in exchange for small items such as his morning milk.

Noddy is kind and honest, but he often gets into trouble, either through his own misunderstandings or because someone, usually one of the naughty goblins Sly or Gobbo, has played a trick on him. He is very childlike in his understanding of the world and often becomes confused as a result. For example, in the first Noddy book, Noddy and Big Ears are building Noddy's house for one. Noddy suggests that they build the roof first, in case it rains. With no understanding of gravity or of the need for roof supports, this is perfectly logical to him. As the series continues, Noddy becomes wiser but without losing his charm and lovable naivety.

Noddy's best friends are Big Ears, Tessie Bear, Bumpy Dog, and the Tubby Bears. Big Ears, who brought Noddy to Toyland, is the most important figure in his life. Whenever he faces serious peril, it tends to be Big Ears who comes to the rescue, one way or another, and it is invariably Big Ears to whom Noddy turns for support and advice. While kind to Noddy, Big Ears has an intimidating presence and voice that makes him feared by goblins. He is capable of facing down wizards with his own spells, and is able to plead Noddy's case to PC Plod, the local policeman, when Noddy finds himself in legal peril. On rare occasions, however, Big Ears finds himself in trouble, in which case Noddy comes to his aid. Big Ears and Noddy have rarely quarreled severely. Examples of such quarrels are when Big Ears harshly scolded the very sensitive Tessie Bear for failing to control her dog and when Noddy ran his car into Big Ears' clothes post and then drove away, dragging Big Ears' clean washing behind him.

Tessie is a gentle-hearted, golden-furred bear who often wears a bonnet with flowers and a skirt. She is young like Noddy, and very loving towards all of her friends and neighbours. Bumpy Dog is Tessie's pet. He liked to run up and "bump" people over. Noddy frequently gets annoyed with Bumpy but still likes him. Whenever Noddy threatens Bumpy, Tessie gets upset, and sometimes even begins to cry. The Tubby Bears live next door to Noddy. They are golden-furred and chubby teddy bears. Mr. and Mrs. Tubby Bear frequently help Noddy. It is clear that Mr. and Mrs. Tubby Bear are the superiors of Noddy, as if he were a child. Their first names are never mentioned and Noddy always refers to them as Mr. and Mrs. They have one son, also named Tubby, who is occasionally referred to as Master Tubby. Tubby is naughty and is usually in trouble for breaking rules, being rude, or doing something wrong. Noddy often attempts to scold or punish Tubby, with little result. On one occasion, Tubby gets tired of always being bossed around and being punished and decides to run away to sea. Noddy and Bumpy accidentally join with him. By the end of the journey, Tubby misses his parents and brings them back presents from his trip, as an apology.

Noddy has many run-ins with PC Plod. Some are caused by Noddy's lack of understanding of how Toyland works. Other times it is because of a case of mistaken identity, PC Plod is generally long-suffering towards Noddy and Noddy likes PC Plod and frequently goes out of his way to help him. Mr. Plod often catches the mischief makers on his police bicycle, by blowing his whistle and shouting "Stop/Halt in the name of Plod!!" until locking the culprits up in his jail.

== Characters ==
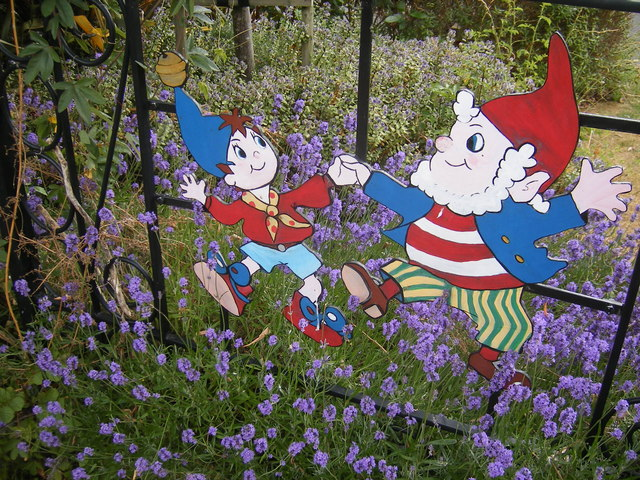
Noddy and Big Ears

=== Introduced in the original books ===
- Big Ears, a wise, bearded brownie who lives in a toadstool house outside of Toyland and is Noddy's best friend, mentor and father figure. He finds Noddy and brings him to Toyland at the start of the first book. Big Ears, while usually kind to Noddy, can be very fierce and is both feared and respected by goblins, wizards, and even Mr. Plod. Whenever Noddy is being mistreated, he invariably comes to his defence. Big Ears also has the power to cast magic spells, though he rarely uses it. His catchphrase is "You funny little Noddy!". In the original books, his name is often spelt with a hyphen. In the book Noddy and the Bunkey, Big Ears is revealed to be over a hundred years old. In Make Way for Noddy, he is depicted as a gnome rather than a brownie. In Noddy, Toyland Detective he is portrayed as squeaky toy, and in the North American dub, he is called Mr. Squeaks.
- Mr. Plod (sometimes called PC Plod), the local policeman. He has an uneven relationship with Noddy, whom he thinks drives too fast and engages in other unwarranted behaviour. He has gone so far as to imprison Noddy at least once, and threatened him with imprisonment on other occasions. His catchphrase is "Stop/Halt in the name of Plod!", as shown in Make Way for Noddy. but in Noddy in Toyland, Mr. Plod becomes a laughing policeman instead. He is reportedly based on PC Christopher Rhone, a Studland police constable.
- Noddy's Car, the yellow car with red paints which Noddy drives. It has a mind of its own and can talk to other characters with its unique sounding "parp parp!" horn.
- Mr. Wobblyman, a roly-poly toy who has a round base which he wobbles about on. He rocks back and forth to get around. In the episode, Noddy's Perfect Gift, it is shown that he may be the owner of the fruit shop in the town square. His catchphrase is I hate it when that happens.
- Mr. and Mrs. Tubby Bear, a teddy bear couple who are Noddy's next-door neighbours. In the original books, it was clear that they are the superiors of Noddy, as if they are adults and he is a child, mainly because Noddy always refers to them as "Mr. and Mrs. Tubby Bear".
- Master Tubby Bear (sometimes called Bruiny Bear), Mr. and Mrs. Tubby Bear's son. He was naughty in the books and past television series, but he was better behaved in Make Way for Noddy.
- Clockwork Mouse, a toy mouse who often requires winding up.
- Tessie Bear, a clever young female teddy bear who is Mr. and Mrs. Tubby Bear's niece and Master Tubby Bear's cousin. She has recently been replaced by a female panda named Pat-Pat.
- Bumpy Dog, a dog from the original books who lives with Tessie Bear, but also accompanies Noddy on many adventures. Noddy first met the Bumpy Dog in Toytown because he was injured and Noddy used his wrap to help him. Noddy felt he was unable to have Bumpy Dog live with him, so Tessie Bear offered to keep him. but from Noddy in Toyland onwards, Noddy decided to keep him as Noddy's pet dog.
- Miss Harriet the Pink Cat (aka Miss Pink Cat), a French pink cat who sells ice cream. She is portrayed as a fussy and neat cat with no patience for foolishness, even her own.
- Mr. Jumbo, an African bush elephant who is friends with Clockwork Mouse.
- The Skittles, a jack family consisting of Sally Skittle and her many children of various sizes. The Skittles are red and yellow in colour with black hands. They like being knocked down and frequently run out in front of Noddy's car so he will hit them and knock them over.
- Mr. Train Driver, the train driver who drives the Toyland Express train.
- Clockwork Clown, a toy clown who does funny tricks. He stands only using his hands, not his feet, as he has "fused" feet like those of a sea lion.
- Bert Monkey, a shy and timid monkey with a sentient and mischievous tail.
- Sammy Sailor, local harbour sailor.
- Mr. Noah, lives on the ark with Mrs. Noah and the animals.
- Mrs. Noah, lives on the ark with Mr. Noah and the animals.
- Stinky, a bum who has never washed in his life.
- Teddy Tubby Bear, Mr. Tubby Bear's brother, Mrs. Tubby Bear's brother-in-law and Master Tubby Bear's uncle, who appeared in the third book, Noddy and His Car.
- Little Ears, Big Ears' brother who looks just like Big Ears. However, his ears are much smaller. He lives in a very tidy toadstool just like Big Ears.
- Bunkey, a thoroughly mischievous character who appears to be a hybrid of bunny and a monkey. He is later shown as a fraudulent monkey who escaped from a travelling circus.
- Miss Prim, the school mistress who replaced the slipper-wielding Miss Rap.
- Mr. Milko, the local milkman.
- Mr. Golly, in the books was the owner of the Toyland garage. Due to casual racism, he was replaced by Mr. Sparks in the TV series in the early 1990s and later editions of the original books on redrawn pages.
- Tricky Teddy, a teddy bear and companion of Gilbert Golly of mischief; in later adaptations they were replaced by a pair of teddy bears and finally by the Goblins Sly and Gobbo.
- Gilbert Golly a golliwog and another villain.

=== Introduced in adaptations ===
- Sly and Gobbo, mischievous goblins. They usually steal things such as ice cream, coins or Noddy's car. They are based on various unnamed goblins that appeared in Enid Blyton's original books.
- Mr. Sparks, Toyland's handyman who can mend anything. His catchphrase is "A challenge? I like it!"
- Dinah Doll, a British-African china doll who sells all kinds of things in the market.
- Martha Monkey, a mischievous tomboyish primate who replaced naughty schoolboy Gilbert Golly.
- Twinkly, a star who has appeared in "Catch a Falling Star."

== Books ==
Noddy
- Cover of the first Noddy story Noddy Goes To Toyland, published in 1949 by Sampson Low; Illustrated by Harmsen van der Beek
- Noddy Goes to Toyland; Hurrah for Little Noddy; Noddy and His Car; Here Comes Noddy Again! Well Done Noddy! Noddy Goes to School; Noddy at the Seaside; Noddy Gets into Trouble; Noddy and the Magic Rubber; You Funny Little Noddy; Noddy Meets Father Christmas; Noddy and Tessie Bear; Be Brave, Little Noddy! Noddy and the Bumpy-Dog; Do Look Out, Noddy; You're a Good Friend, Noddy; Noddy Has an Adventure; Noddy Goes to Sea; Noddy and the Bunkey; Cheer Up, Little Noddy! Noddy Goes to the Fair; Mr. Plod and Little Noddy; Noddy and the Tootles; Noddy and the Aeroplane
- Author: Enid Blyton
- Country: United Kingdom
- Language: English
- Genre: Children's literature
- Published: 1949–63
- No. of books: 24

Early Noddy books have become collectibles, along with other Blytons. The total number is hard to count: the Noddy Library (Sampson Low) of two dozen titles, which became the New Noddy Library when revised, was just part of a big production in the 1950s, with Big Noddy Books of larger format, and strip books. There were numerous spin-offs, also. Widely differing estimates can be found.

The 24 original Noddy books by Enid Blyton were published between 1949 and 1963. Harmsen Van der Beek illustrated the first 7 Noddy books. After Beek's death in 1953 the original style was maintained by illustrators Robert Tyndall, Peter Wienk, Mary Brooks and Robert Lee.

Sales of Noddy books are large, with an estimated 600,000 annual sales in France alone, and growing popularity in India and Portugal, a large market for Blyton books. The Noddy character was formerly owned by Chorion, who sold the rights on to DreamWorks Classics (a part of DreamWorks Animation, in which now a subsidiary of NBCUniversal) in 2012.

1. Noddy Goes to Toyland (1949)
2. Hurrah for Little Noddy (1950)
3. Noddy and His Car (1951)
4. Here Comes Noddy Again! (1951)
5. Well Done Noddy! (1952)
6. Noddy Goes to School (1952)
7. Noddy at the Seaside (1953)
8. Noddy Gets into Trouble (1954)
9. Noddy and the Magic Rubber (1954)
10. You Funny Little Noddy (1955)
11. Noddy Meets Father Christmas (1955)
12. Noddy and Tessie Bear (1956)
13. Be Brave, Little Noddy! (1956)
14. Noddy and the Bumpy-Dog (1957)
15. Do Look Out, Noddy (1957)
16. You're a Good Friend, Noddy (1958)
17. Noddy Has an Adventure (1958)
18. Noddy Goes to Sea (1959)
19. Noddy and the Bunkey (1959)
20. Cheer Up, Little Noddy! (1960)
21. Noddy Goes to the Fair (1960)
22. Mr. Plod and Little Noddy (1961)
23. Noddy and the Tootles (1962)
24. Noddy and the Aeroplane (1963)

(Only 24 in the set)

Separate Book: Noddy and Big-Ears (1952)

On 17 November 2008, it was announced that Enid Blyton's granddaughter, Sophie Smallwood, was to write a new Noddy book to celebrate the character's 60th birthday. Noddy and the Farmyard Muddle (2009) was illustrated by Robert Tyndall, who has drawn the characters in the Noddy books since 1953, ever since the death of the original illustrator, Harmsen van der Beek.

== Television adaptations and other incarnations ==
In the 1990s and early 2000s TV series adaptations, as well as a new series of books, Noddy has been updated, with the original Golliwog characters replaced by other sorts of toys. For example, Mr. Golly who ran the Toyland garage was replaced by French Monsieur Polly in the 1975 series, and, during the 1992–2000 series, by Mr. Sparks. Dinah Doll, a British-African female character, was added to the franchise by then.

- The Adventures of Noddy (1955–1962) – a black-and-white puppet series on ATV.
- Noddy Goes to Toyland (1963) – An animated short film made by the works of Arthur Humberstone Films.
- Noddy (1975–1976) – A series produced for ITV by Cosgrove Hall Films' predecessor company Stop Frame Productions.
- The Further Adventures of Noddy (1983) – A stop-frame animated pilot made by the works of FilmFair.
- Noddy's Toyland Adventures (1992–2000) – The BBC's adaptation of the Noddy franchise. Produced by Cosgrove Hall Films.
- The Noddy Shop (1998–1999) – Canadian/American adaptation featuring redubbed animations from Noddy's Toyland Adventures, released in other territories as Noddy in Toyland.
- Make Way for Noddy (2002) – The first CGI series of Noddy which was commissioned by Channel 5 and aired as a part of their Milkshake! block. Produced by Chorion in association with SD Entertainment who did the animation.
- Noddy in Toyland (2009) – The second Noddy series to be made in CGI for the 60th anniversary of the franchise. Produced by Chorion in association with Brown Bag Films.
- Noddy, Toyland Detective (2016–2020) – DreamWorks' reimagining of the franchise and overall the third CGI incarnation of the character to be produced to date.

== Video game adaptations ==
There has been 3 video games featuring Noddy:

- Noddy's Playtime (1992) – The Jumping Bean Company's educational game for Amiga 500
- Noddy's Big Adventure (1993) – The Jumping Bean Company's educational game for Amiga 500
- Noddy's Magic Adventure (2000) – Mind's Eye Productions' educational game for Playstation 1

== Stage productions ==
Programme of Noddy in Toyland at the Stoll Theatre, London

Noddy first appeared on stage at the million-seat Stoll Theatre in Kingsway, London, in 1954. The very large cast were all children or teenagers, mostly from the Italia Conti acting school. There was a full-theatre orchestra. The final part was a scene at the "Faraway Tree", with many of the children dressed as fairies, flying on wires. It ran for many years, but the Stoll was knocked down and replaced by an office block in the late 1950s. The Peacock Theatre was built in the basement of the new building, but Noddy did not return.

In 1993, a stage production of Noddy opened at the New Wimbledon Theatre, followed by a long British national tour, including a holiday season in London at the Lyric Theatre, Hammersmith, and was released on home video in 1994. The production was presented by Clarion Productions. The production was written and directed by David Wood with scene and costume designs by Susie Calcutt. The original cast included Eric Potts as Big Ears and Karen Briffett as Noddy. The show was very well received among critics, audiences and even Enid Blyton's daughter Gillian Baverstock. David Wood adapted a successful sequel to the play entitled "Noddy and the Tootle" which opened at the Wimbledon Theatre and endured on a long British national tour in 1995–96. Karen Briffett reprised her role as Noddy and Big Ears was played by Jonathan Broxholme. This production was too presented by Clarion Productions.

In 2004, a live show called "Noddy Live!" took a live tour around the UK from 21 December 2004 until 5 March 2005, and returned on 21 December until 29 December in the same year.

== Other media ==
The puppet of Big Ears from the 1955 television series The Adventures of Noddy appeared as a member of the "Puppet Government" in The Goodies episode "The Goodies Rule – O.K.?".

There was a spoof page of "Noddy-ana" in Hot Rod magazine (UK), in about 1976–1978; Noddy had a hot rod, and Big Ears smoked, and was very disrespectful to Mr. Plod.

In 1977, Noddy and Big Ears appeared in a television advertisement for Vymura wallpaper. In the advertisement, the two characters quarrel over the choice of wallpaper and curtains. Mr. Plod and Big Ears' cat Whiskers also appear. The advertisement was narrated by Richard Briers, who previously narrated the 1975 Noddy television series.

Noddy, Big Ears and PC Plod are referred to in the Two Ronnies crossword sketch where Ronnie Corbett thinks their names are "Roddy, Big Ears, and PC Plop!"

In 1985, Noddy, Big Ears and Mr. Tubby Bear appeared in a television advertisement for Direct Line Insurance. In the advertisement, Noddy's car breaks down and he reassures Big Ears that they are insured with Direct Line and simply need to "pick up the nearest phone." The advertisement ends with Mr. Tubby Bear uprooting a red telephone box. The music track "Off to Play" by David Snell is used.

In Alan Moore's series The League of Extraordinary Gentlemen, Toyland is a real nation located in the Arctic Circle. The King and Queen of Toyland are Frankenstein's Monster and Olympia, the automaton from The Tales of Hoffmann.

IDW's The Transformers introduced the character of "Tappet", a robot who is based on Noddy visually and clearly transforms into Noddy's classic car.

In the book Seven Deadly Wonders by Matthew Reilly, a character is nicknamed Noddy, while his best friend's nickname is Big Ears.

In an episode of Last of the Summer Wine, all of the characters are dressed up as fairytale characters for a parade. Smiler is dressed as Noddy complete with a smaller version of his car in order to tow a bouncy castle with the rest of the characters on it, but it deflated while they were taking part.

Noddy also features in the art and song titles on several Current 93 records.

== Reception ==
Like many of Blyton's works, Noddy has been subject to criticism. In a scathing article published in Encounter in 1958, the journalist Colin Welch described Noddy as an "unnaturally priggish ... sanctimonious ... witless, spiritless, snivelling, sneaking doll."

Caribbean-American novelist/essayist Jamaica Kincaid considers the Noddy books to be "deeply racist" due to the blonde-haired children and the Black golliwogs. A number of older publications of Noddy books feature golliwogs. It has been stated that some were heroes, while others were villains or naughty individuals. Professor David Rudd noted that golliwogs in the Noddy series were treated more as ambivalent tricksters than purely malicious figures. He counted the characters in the books, stating that there were numerically more bad teddy bears than golliwogs in the books.

The Golliwog characters were retired in the 1970s and replaced by other characters, such as Mr. Golly and Gilbert Golly being replaced by Mr. Sparks and Martha Monkey respectively. The villainous Golliwogs were replaced by goblins, most notably Sly and Gobbo.

The friendship between Noddy and Big Ears has sometimes been interpreted as having homosexual overtones, which included them sharing a bed. In 1990, the publishers withdrew the existing editions and published revised versions. A report in The Dominion in August 1990 noted that the changes included the removal of "those cosy little scenes that depict Noddy and his best friend, Big Ears cuddling up in bed together after a cup of hot chocolate", the rewriting of words such as "gay" and "queer" (used by Blyton in their older senses), and other updates to characters and language.

== Legacy ==
Noddy being associated with small children's reading has led to "Noddy" being sometimes used as an adjective meaning "petty or trivial" (compare with "Mickey Mouse"), for example, in computer programming: "This simultaneous linear equation subroutine crashes out on the Noddy case when n = 1, but otherwise it works." or "Remember to check all the Noddy cases."

In the United Kingdom, the word "plod" became a slang term to describe a police officer, or the police service, after the character Mr. Plod. For example, somebody could say, "I'm not having a good morning, I was driving to work and got pulled over by the plod for driving too fast." The Ministry of Defence Police is also nicknamed "MOD Plod".

In 1998, Noddy collector John Street, who owned a real Noddy-coloured Fiat Gamine, appeared on Channel 5's The Car Show.

In 2014, a plaque recording Enid Blyton's time as a Beaconsfield resident from 1938 until her death in 1968 was unveiled in the town hall gardens, next to small iron figures of Noddy and Big Ears.

== See also ==
- Toytown was a BBC radio series for children, broadcast for Children's Hour on the Home Service from 1929. It featured Larry The Lamb as its chief character.
