= List of Danger Mouse (2015 TV series) episodes =

Danger Mouse is a reboot animated television series developed by Brian Cosgrove. It first premiered on 28 September 2015. A reboot of the 1981 television series of the same name, the series centres around Danger Mouse (Alexander Armstrong), the self-proclaimed "World's Greatest Secret Agent", who fights against injustice with his cowardly and clumsy yet loyal sidekick Ernest Penfold (Kevin Eldon). They are employed by the absent-minded but slightly firm Colonel K (Stephen Fry) and usually assisted by the inventions of short-tempered genius Professor Squawkencluck (Shauna Macdonald). With these assets, the duo are able to defeat their adversaries, such as arch-enemy Baron Silas von Greenback (Ed Gaughan).

In April 2016, the series was renewed for a second season. As of April 2019, two series of Danger Mouse have been produced totalling 99 episodes.

== Series overview ==
Series	Episodes	Originally released	
Series	Episodes	First released	Last released
1	50 (2 specials)	28 September 2015	20 October 2016
2	49 (3 specials)	14 June 2017	19 March 2019

== Episodes ==
=== Series 1 (2015–16) ===
Series 1 premiered on the 34-year anniversary of the 1981 series of the same name: 28 September 2015. Originally planned to consist of 52 episodes, the series in the end would only consist of 50 episodes. The opening episode being a double length special. The first of two. A Christmas special, the second of the two double-length episodes, this with Richard Ayoade and Brian Blessed was confirmed: "The Snowman Cometh".

No. overall	No. in series	Title	Directed by	Written by	Original release date	U.S. air date
1	1	"Danger Mouse Begins... Again"	Robert Cullen	Ben Ward	28 September 2015	2 May 2016
Danger Mouse and Penfold are back but are fired for destroying London. Baron Greenback, seemingly reformed as Baron Silas von Greenback, creates an army of robots to protect the world's leaders. However, Danger Mouse suspects Greenback is up to no good. NOTE: This episode was released on Nick.com and digital platforms on 1 April 2016.
2	2	"Danger at C Level"	Robert Cullen	Nathan Cockerill; Head Writer: Ben Ward	29 September 2015	4 May 2016
Penfold's sick of getting injured on missions, so Danger Mouse agrees to take him on holiday. But then mutant sea monsters start to menace the world and Danger Mouse must decide between his mission and his friend. Title reference: "Danger at Sea Level" NOTE: This episode was released on Nick.com and digital platforms on 15 April 2016.
3	3	"Greenfinger"	Robert Cullen	Mark Oswin and James Griffiths; Head Writer: Ben Ward	30 September 2015	4 May 2016
Danger Mouse tries to prove to Professor Squawkencluck that he can be trusted, but accidentally allows a strange and inexplicably Welsh alien plant, named Evans, to grow all over the Earth. Worse, Penfold can't stop making jam! Title reference: Goldfinger NOTE: This episode was released on Nick.com and digital platforms on 15 April 2016.
4	4	"Planet of the Toilets"	Robert Cullen	Nick Ostler and Mark Huckerby; Head Writer: Ben Ward	1 October 2015	3 May 2016
An artificially intelligent robotic toilet, through Penfold's own fault, reinvents itself as "Dr Loo-cifer" and leads a revolt of the world's toilets. Title reference: Planet of the Apes
5	5	"Pink Dawn"	Robert Cullen	Nick Ostler and Mark Huckerby; Head Writer: Ben Ward	2 October 2015	3 May 2016
Danger Mouse must embrace his feminine side to stop the pink-obsessed supervillain, the Princess, from turning the whole world girly. Title reference: Red Dawn
6	6	"Big Head Awakens"	Robert Cullen	Andrew Burrell; Head Writer: Ben Ward	5 October 2015	5 May 2016
Professor Squawkencluck's new security system goes berserk and must be stopped – if only DM and the Professor could stop arguing for long enough.
7	7	"The World Wide Spider"	Robert Cullen	Ben Ward	6 October 2015	5 May 2016
A giant spider is rampaging across the world and Danger Mouse must stop it... or at least he would, if not for his Arachnophobia. Title reference: The World Wide Web
8	8	"The Other Day the Earth Stood Still"	Robert Cullen	Written by: Rob Sprackling and John Smith; With Additional Material by: Ben Ward; Head Writer: Ben Ward	7 October 2015	9 May 2016
Greenback's plague of red traffic lights brings all the world's traffic to a standstill – and then he puts a red light in orbit, and the world itself gets brought to a standstill and everything floats into space - except for the Baron due to shoes that stick to the floor! Title reference: The Day the Earth Stood Still
9	9	"Welcome to Danger World!"	Robert Cullen	Ben Ward	8 October 2015	10 May 2016
An alien huckster, named Quark, makes Danger Mouse the most popular tourist attraction in the universe.
10	10	"Jeopardy Mouse"	Robert Cullen	Ben Ward	9 October 2015	6 May 2016
Danger Mouse must work with America's best secret agent, Jeopardy Mouse, to foil Greenback's scheme to rearrange the countries, but DM's showboating does not endear him to Jeopardy's no-nonsense attitude.
11	11	"The Return of Danger K"	Robert Cullen	Ben Ward	12 October 2015	6 May 2016
When an old enemy, Birch Badboy, comes to take over the world via rudeness, Colonel K must return to his secret agent job, as Danger K, to stop him from turning everyone rude.
12	12	"Big Penfold"	Robert Cullen	Howard Read and Chris Chantler; Head Writer: Ben Ward	13 October 2015	17 May 2016
Professor Squawkencluck makes a growing/shrinking invention to save the world from a meteor attack. When Penfold is accidentally turned huge, trying to stretch his trousers after they got shrunk in the hot wash, DM figures out it could actually be helpful to save the world. Guest star: Richard Osman as Professor Strontium Jellyfishowitz
13	13	"The Unusual Suspects"	Robert Cullen	Nick Ostler and Mark Huckerby; Head Writer: Ben Ward	14 October 2015	18 May 2016
The secret service agents have suspicions that someone is trying to take a new chemical from them, and all fingers of suspicion are pointing towards Colonel K.
14	14	"Danger Fan"	Robert Cullen	Emma Kennedy; Head Writer: Ben Ward	15 October 2015	13 May 2016
Danger Mouse's biggest fan, named Ian, known as the Danger Fan, comes to visit, on the same day as his yearly inspection. Unfortunately, Danger Mouse fails to capture his enemies. Guest star: Richard Ayoade as The Snowman
15	15	"Quark Games"	Robert Cullen	Nick Ostler and Mark Huckerby; Head Writer: Ben Ward	16 October 2015	19 May 2016
Quark traps Danger Mouse, Penfold and Jeopardy Mouse in his new game where old foes return. Title reference: Olympic Games
16	16	"The Snowman Cometh"	Robert Cullen	Nick Ostler and Mark Huckerby; Head Writer: Ben Ward	16 December 2015	25 November 2016
The Snowman is fed up of Christmas and being made fun of for being considered harmless, so he steals Santa Claus' powerful hat, when he has had enough of being made fun of. Danger Mouse and Penfold must get it back in order to save Christmas. Title reference: The Iceman Cometh Guest stars: Richard Ayoade as The Snowman and Brian Blessed as Santa Claus
17	17	"The Inventor Preventer"	Robert Cullen	Howard Read; Head Writer: Ben Ward	15 February 2016	12 May 2016
Danger Mouse and Penfold must prevent Isambard King Kong Brunel from travelling back in time and un-inventing the world.
18	18	"Never Say Clever Again"	Robert Cullen	Nick Ostler and Mark Huckerby; Head Writer: Ben Ward	16 February 2016	11 May 2016
After all the other Danger Agents, and Penfold, become super-intelligent, as a result of eating brainpower-enhancing celery, Danger Mouse considers looking for a new job. However, there is a little hitch in the celery, as Nero, on Greenback's orders, snuck into HQ and his DNA polluted the gene pool. Title reference: Never Say Never Again
19	19	"Sinister Mouse"	Robert Cullen	Ben Ward	17 February 2016	16 May 2016
An evil version of Danger Mouse escapes from a parallel dimension, called the Twystyverse, and teams up with Greenback to defeat his good counterpart.
20	20	"There's No Place Like Greenback"	Robert Cullen	Nick Ostler and Mark Huckerby; Head Writer: Ben Ward	18 February 2016	20 May 2016
Danger Mouse and Penfold become reluctant surrogate parents to Baron Greenback, who seems to have accidentally erased his own memory when his latest evil scheme goes wrong. Title reference: There's no place like home
21	21	"From Duck to Dawn"	Robert Cullen	Nick Ostler and Mark Huckerby; Head Writer: Ben Ward	19 February 2016	13 June 2016
While on a mission in Transylvania, Danger Mouse and Penfold meet a show-obsessed vampire duck named Count Duckula, who is determined to take over the world, one terrible TV show at a time. He also turns the watchers (including Penfold) into vegetables! Title reference: From Dusk to Dawn
22	22	"Happy Boom Day!"	Robert Cullen	Mark Oswin and James Griffiths; Head Writer: Ben Ward	22 February 2016	15 June 2016
Danger Mouse's plans for Professor Squawkencluck's surprise birthday party get a hiatus when Baron von Greenback unleashes killer birthday presents upon the world to avenge his own birthday and to claim the earth as his ultimate present. Title reference: Happy birthday!
23	23	"Frankensquawk's Monster"	Robert Cullen	Ben Ward	23 February 2016	14 June 2016
When Professor Squawkencluck's mother comes to visit HQ, a giant mutant rubbish monster is not too far behind. Title reference: Frankenstein's Monster
24	24	"Escape From Big Head"	Robert Cullen	Nick Ostler and Mark Huckerby; Head Writer: Ben Ward	24 February 2016	16 June 2016
Professor Squawkencluck attempts to reactivate her "Big Head" security system, but it goes into lockdown once again and imprisons everyone in a maximum-security dungeon.
25	25	"Megahurtz Attacks"	Robert Cullen	Sophie Petzal; Head Writer: Ben Ward	25 February 2016	13 September 2016
A failed attempt to boost Penfold's self-confidence leads to a super-powerful game monster escaping into the real world. Title reference: Mega Man
26	26	"The Hamster Effect"	Robert Cullen	Nick Ostler and Mark Huckerby; Head Writer: Ben Ward	26 February 2016	12 September 2016
To prevent them from ruining his evil plans again, the deranged time-travelling chimp, Brunel, travels back in time to prevent Danger Mouse and Penfold from ever meeting.
27	27	"The Good, the Baaaaa and the Ugly"	Robert Cullen	Andrew Burrell; Head Writer: Ben Ward	3 June 2016	14 September 2016
When Danger Mouse and Penfold are sent on a rescue mission to a mysterious island, Danger Mouse's over-competitiveness borders on criminal. Title reference: The Good, the Bad and the Ugly Trivia: The original airing of this episode featured a theme tune performed by various fans of the series.
28	28	"Attack of the Clowns"	Robert Cullen	Nick Ostler and Mark Huckerby; Head Writer: Ben Ward	27 June 2016	15 September 2016
Danger Mouse's uncontrollable laughter annoys a race of clown aliens, named the Bozorians, so much that they invade Earth! Title reference: Star Wars: Episode II – Attack of the Clones
29	29	"Cheesemageddon"	Robert Cullen	Nathan Cockerill; Head Writer: Ben Ward	28 June 2016	3 October 2016
Danger Mouse and the Baron are forced to team up to defeat a villain who is obsessed with cheese, Monsieur Aubrey le Camambert. Title reference: Armageddon
30	30	"Queen of Weevils"	Robert Cullen	Ben Ward	29 June 2016	7 October 2016
Whilst trying to prove that magic doesn't exist, Danger Mouse accidentally unleashes an evil magical queen into the world! Title reference: Queen of Hearts Guest star: Miranda Richardson as Queen of Weevils
31	31	"Hail Hydrant"	Robert Cullen	Nick Ostler and Mark Huckerby; Head Writer: Ben Ward	30 June 2016	6 October 2016
Danger Mouse must battle a criminal organisation called Hydrant after finding out he has lost Agent Of The Month to Jeopardy Mouse. Title reference: Hail Hydra Guest star: Lindsey Russell as Hysteria
32	32	"Wicked Leaks"	Robert Cullen	Tony Cooke; Head Writer: Ben Ward	1 July 2016	4 October 2016
Penfold's addiction to social media helps the Baron turn all of DM's secrets against him in order for him to use Big Ben as a diamond-tipped drill to ball through the Earth for the tonnes of gold, in the Earth's core.
33	33	"Tomorrow Never Comes"	Robert Cullen	Nick Ostler and Mark Huckerby; Head Writer: Ben Ward	4 July 2016	16 September 2016
The Princess is back and erases all weekdays so she can play at the weekend forever! Danger Mouse must ruin everyone's lives by fixing the problem. Title reference: Tomorrow Never Comes
34	34	"Half the World is Enough"	Robert Cullen	Reid Harrison; Head Writer: Ben Ward	5 July 2016	5 October 2016
When Danger Mouse is responsible for Professor Squawkencluck losing her job, his clumsy attempts to get her back help the Baron split the Earth in two. Title reference: The Earth is Enough
35	35	"Send in the Clones"	Robert Cullen	Josh Weinstein; Head Writer: Ben Ward	6 July 2016	14 November 2016
The dynamic duo take on a shoddy army of knock-offs when Quark's latest money-making scheme is to create cheap copies of Danger Mouse and Penfold. Title reference: "Send in the Clowns"
36	36	"Masters of the Twystyverse"	Robert Cullen	Ben Ward	7 July 2016	15 November 2016
DM and Penfold travel to the Twystyverse in a bid to stop Penfold's evil counterpart, Baron Silas von Penfold, from taking over both versions of the Earth. Title reference: Masters of the Universe
37	37	"Danger is Forever"	Robert Cullen	Mick O'Hara and Ciaran Morrison; Head Writer: Ben Ward	3 October 2016	17 November 2016
When the Baron speeds up the rotation of the Earth using windmills, DM and Penfold age 300 years and must take on their nemesis as very old individuals. Title reference: "Evil is Forever"
38	38	"Very Important Penfold"	Robert Cullen	Mark Oswin and James Griffiths; Head Writer: Ben Ward	4 October 2016	16 November 2016
When Penfold saves a celebrity from certain doom he becomes a media sensation. DM smells a rat, or at least some evil villainous hamster from another dimension. Title reference: Very Important Person
39	39	"The Cute Shall Inherit the Earth"	Robert Cullen	Lucy Guy; Head Writer: Ben Ward	5 October 2016	9 January 2017
The plucky rodent springs into action when cute kittens start infiltrating positions of authority in London.
40	40	"All 5 It"	Robert Cullen	Mike Benner; Head Writer: Ben Ward	6 October 2016	18 November 2016
The crimebusting rodent goes undercover as the fifth member of Quark's mega-popular boy band discovering his inner performer while Penfold discovers a musical plot to destroy the world.
41	41	"Dream Worrier"	Robert Cullen	Mark Oswin and James Griffiths; Head Writer: Ben Ward	7 October 2016	17 November 2016
DM takes on Quark again, but this time in his strangest setting yet: Penfold's dreams! Title reference: A Nightmare on Elm Street 3: Dream Warriors
42	42	"The Confidence Trick"	Robert Cullen	Nick Ostler and Mark Huckerby; Head Writer: Ben Ward	10 October 2016	10 January 2017
Danger Mouse's confidence takes a hit when the Baron accidentally steals it and invigorates his shy daughter, Delilah von Greenback, to create a criminal mastermind! But unfortunately, his plans backfire when she wants to become an evil mastermind herself! Can "The Scrapbook of Momentous Mouse Moments" help DM find it within himself to fight back, or will Delilah make her own planet of planets, called "Delilahiana". Title reference: The Confidence Man
43	43	"The Spy Who Came In With A Cold"	Robert Cullen	Danielle Ward; Head Writer: Ben Ward	11 October 2016	11 January 2017
Greenback unleashes a new strain of elephant flu upon the world! Will Penfold's immunity to the virus save the day, or will his fear of elephants doom the world? Title reference: The Spy Who Came in From the Cold
44	44	"Sir Danger de Mouse"	Robert Cullen	Ben Ward	12 October 2016	12 January 2017
The Queen of Weevils returns and convinces DM he's a medieval knight in order to escape from a secure prison - can Penfold break the spell and prevent London becoming a medieval city? Plot reference: Star Wars: Episode IV – A New Hope Guest star: Miranda Richardson as Queen of Weevils
45	45	"The Duckula Show"	Robert Cullen	Ben Ward	13 October 2016	9 February 2017
Danger Mouse faces the prospect of being written out of his own show, after Count Duckula kidnaps the writers and forces them to make him the star. Guest star: Ben Ward as Monkey Writer
46	46	"Agent 58"	Robert Cullen	Howard Read and Chris Chantler; Head Writer: Ben Ward	14 October 2016	6 February 2017
It's Crimicon - the Annual Criminal World Convention - and DM and Penfold are joined by a brand new secret agent, named Agent 58, to stop Brunel from selling a potentially catastrophic custard bomb doomsday weapon. But, unfortunately for them, he's sold it to Baron Greenback! Title reference: Agent 47 or Agent 51
47	47	"Thanks a Minion!"	Robert Cullen	Mark Banker; Head Writer: Ben Ward	17 October 2016	8 February 2017
Stiletto plots to destroy the world with robot termites, if he doesn't get the Best Minion Award at the Sidekickie Awards, and DM gets overly enthusiastic for Penfold to win the Best Sidekick Award. Title reference: Thanks a million!
48	48	"High School Inedible"	Robert Cullen	Merrill Hagan; Head Writer: Ben Ward	18 October 2016	7 February 2017
DM and Penfold go back to school to thwart the plans of an evil food scientist, named Professor Ham Hands and his killer hot dogs. Also, Danger Mouse needs to pass his final science test or his spy license will be revoked. Title reference: High School Musical Guest star: Ben Willbond as Professor Ham Hands
49	49	"Mousefall"	Robert Cullen	Ben Ward	19 October 2016	15 February 2017
Danger Mouse encounters his toughest challenge of the series as the maniacal trillionaire known as Crumhorn, releases every enemy DM has ever battled. Once all the villains are defeated, except for the Princess (who is Crumhorn's daughter), he and Penfold go after her and DM fights Crumhorn. While fighting Crumhorn, he gets zapped by guns and lazers. Has the world's greatest secret agent survived this epic battle with Crumhorn and been buried under the rubble, or is this the end of Danger Mouse as we know it? Part 1 of 2 Title reference: Skyfall Guest star: John Oliver as Crumhorn and Richard Ayoade as The Snowman
50	50	"Mouse Rise"	Robert Cullen	Ben Ward	20 October 2016	15 February 2017
Penfold and Crumhorn find out that Danger Mouse is still alive, but is lost in a jungle. Penfold sets out to rescue him while Crumhorn is set on destroying him. When they arrive, they find out that DM has amnesia and can't remember anything so he can't stop Crumhorn leaving the rest of the agency to stop him. Can Penfold, Professor Squawkencluck and Colonel K stop Crumhorn, will DM get his memory back or will Crumhorn take over the world? Part 2 of 2 Guest star: John Oliver as Crumhorn

=== Series 2 (2017–19) ===
The first two episodes of series 2 were supposed to have premiered on 24 May 2017 as part of CBBC's "Danger Mouse Day", followed by the rest of the series from 4 September 2017. However, "Danger Mouse Day" was later postponed until 14 June 2017.

Originally planned to consist of 3 series across 102 episodes (50 episodes of Series 1 and two further series each of 26 episodes). It was later decided that the 26 episodes of 11 minutes making up a planned third series would be dropped and to instead extend Series 2 to include 49 episodes with 3 being double length specials. The series would now have a total of 99 episodes. The first 5 new episodes of the series were shown on the BBC iPlayer, with new episode being screened on CBBC from 17 September 2018.

No. overall	No. in series	Title	Directed by	Written by	Original release date	U.S. air date
51	1	"Dark Dawn"	Robert Cullen	Nick Ostler and Mark Huckerby; Head Writer: Ben Ward	14 June 2017	8 January 2018
The Princess becomes a teenager, known as Dark Dawn, and she forgets about Mr. Snuggles, who turns all the teddies in the world, including Penfold's teddy bear, Bernard, evil that can help him attack the world, due to Dawn's changes as a teenager.
52	2	"The Admirable Penfold"	Robert Cullen	Merrill Hagan; Head Writer: Ben Ward	14 June 2017	11 January 2018
Penfold and Baron von Greenback are forced to ally when they get stranded on an island. Title reference: The Admirable Crichton
53	3	"Colonel Danger Mouse"	Robert Cullen	Ben Ward	4 September 2017	9 January 2018
When Colonel K goes on holiday, Danger Mouse steps in. However, he can't handle the paperwork, do the missions himself or control the agents. Worse, Colonel K has been kidnapped by Baron von Greenback!
54	4	"Ernest Penfold and the Half Price Wand"	Robert Cullen	Nick Ostler and Mark Huckerby; Head Writer: Ben Ward	5 September 2017	10 January 2018
Envious at Danger Mouse's ever-growing medal collection, Penfold falls under the spell of Quark's latest money-making scheme. Title reference: Harry Potter and the Half-Blood Prince
55	5	"Squawkenbard Kingcluck Brunel"	Robert Cullen	Danielle Ward; Head Writer: Ben Ward	6 September 2017	6 February 2018
Professor Squawkencluck's body swap with King Kong Brunel has dire consequences at the annual science convention.
56	6	"Live and Let Cry"	Robert Cullen	Jessica Ransom; Head Writer: Ben Ward	7 September 2017	5 February 2018
Danger Mouse leads the Danger Babies astray after he tells them a story that he, Penfold, Professor Squawkencluck and Colonel K are all villains in disguise. Title reference: Live and Let Die
57	7	"Lost Tempers in Space"	Robert Cullen	Nick Ostler and Mark Huckerby; Head Writer: Ben Ward	8 September 2017	20 November 2017
Danger Mouse and Jeopardy's inability to work together after a mission in space goes wrong forces each of them to strike out on their own, with DM coming face to face with an old adversary. Title reference: Lost in Space
58	8	"The Toad Who Would Be King"	Robert Cullen	Ben Ward	11 September 2017	21 November 2017
The Baron's love for The Queen of Great Goldlandia threatens to bring Danger Mouse to his knees when the Baron becomes king and DM becomes his personal bodyguard! Title reference: The Man Who Would Be King
59	9	"I Believe In Danger Mouse"	Robert Cullen	Ben Ward	12 September 2017	22 November 2017
The cult of cats from "The Cute Shall Inherit the Earth" adopt Danger Mouse as their leader. Title reference: "I Believe in a Thing Called Love"
60	10	"Thanksgiving Sinner"	Robert Cullen	Merrill Hagan; Head Writer: Ben Ward	13 September 2017	23 November 2017
Danger Mouse and Penfold get a taste of Thanksgiving when they join Jeopardy Mouse in America. When in America with Jeopardy, they discover that Professor Ham Hands has joined Hydrant. Title reference: Thanksgiving Dinner Guest stars: Lindsey Russell as Hysteria and Ben Willbond as Professor Ham Hands
61	11	"Big Trouble In Little Clowntown"	Robert Cullen	Reid Harrison; Head Writer: Ben Ward	14 September 2017	7 February 2018
Professor Squawkencluck's seriousizer is nabbed by Pompom, the fun and laughter-hating president of the clown planet of Bozoria. Title reference: Big Trouble in Little China
62	12	"Quantum Of Rudeness"	Robert Cullen	Andrew Burrell; Head Writer: Ben Ward	15 September 2017	8 February 2018
The 'ping' of a microwave causes Danger Mouse to blast a hole in the wall of Squawkencluck's laboratory and inadvertently discover (and create) Birch Badboy's origins. Title reference: Quantum of Solace
63	13	"A Loo to A Kill"	Robert Cullen	Mark Oswin and James Griffiths; Head Writer: Ben Ward	18 September 2017	20 March 2018
During filming for a film adaptation of the events of "Planet of the Toilets", Colonel K and Professor Squawkencluck are zapped and turned into toilets. Title reference: A View to a Kill
64	14	"Roll of the Mice"	Robert Cullen	Michael Benner; Head Writer: Ben Ward	19 September 2017	19 March 2018
Ian, the Danger Fan, traps Danger Mouse and Jeopardy in an interactive board game and forces Penfold to play for his friends' lives! Title reference: "Roll of the Dice"
65	15	"Gold Flinger"	Robert Cullen	Ben Ward	20 September 2017	21 March 2018
Danger Mouse's addiction to challenges threatens the world when Quark tricks him into transporting a ticking timebomb back to Earth! Title reference: Goldfinger
66	16	"There's Something About Scarlett"	Robert Cullen	Mark Oswin and James Griffiths; Head Writer: Ben Ward	21 September 2017	22 March 2018
When Penfold scores a date with superstar Scarlett Johamster, Danger Mouse and the Professor provide conflicting advice. Title reference: There's Something About Mary
67	17	"Groundmouse Day"	Robert Cullen	Mark Oswin and James Griffiths; Head Writer: Ben Ward	22 September 2017	9 April 2018
Penfold must repeat the same day over and over again to stop a time-altering Duckula from framing DM. Title reference: Groundhog Day
68	18	"Dry Hard"	Robert Cullen	Nick Ostler and Mark Huckerby; Head Writer: Ben Ward	25 September 2017	11 April 2018
A late night scary movie makes Penfold even extra jittery, forcing Danger Mouse to make his sidekick sit out the latest mission which is to stop the Baron from flooding the world. Title reference: Die Hard
69	19	"Day of the Derek"	Robert Cullen	Howard Read and Chris Chantler; Head Writer: Ben Ward	26 September 2017	10 April 2018
Derek Mollar a geeky descendant of DM, travels back in time to try to stop Danger Mouse from destroying the world. Title reference: Day of the Dead
70	20	"Crumfan"	Robert Cullen	Nick Ostler and Mark Huckerby; Head Writer: Ben Ward	27 September 2017	12 April 2018
Danger Mouse and Penfold arrive at the UN to scenes of quarrelling diplomats, caused by a sabotaged translation system. They also discover Ian has become a fan of Crumhorn. Guest star: John Oliver as Crumhorn
71	21	"Nero Come Home"	Robert Cullen	Nick Ostler and Mark Huckerby; Head Writer: Ben Ward	28 September 2017	13 April 2018
Danger Mouse and Squawk discover the Baron's plans to brainwash the world's pets into becoming his personal army of slaves, while Nero ends up in Penfold's care. Title reference: Lassie Come Home
72	22	"Dark Side of the Mouse"	Robert Cullen	Ben Ward	29 September 2017	30 March 2018
Crumhorn is back! Danger Mouse has released him by mistake! He, now, uses a ray that controls people and gets Ivana the Invisible, Megahurtz, Rocket Sloth and Baron von Greenback to help him defeat Crumhorn. But is DM starting to turn villainous in the process? Title reference: Dark Side of the Force Guest star: John Oliver as Crumhorn
73	23	"The Scare Mouse Project"	Robert Cullen	Andrew Burrell; Head Writer: Ben Ward	31 October 2017	13 April 2018
Danger Mouse learns the meaning of fear when he meets a hair-raisingly spooky villain! Title reference: The Blair Witch Project
74	24	"Yule Only Watch Twice"	Robert Cullen	Ben Ward and Andrew Burrell; Head Writer: Ben Ward	15 December 2017	23 November 2018
Whilst driving, the lights go out and the Danger Car disappears. When the lights come back on, DM and Penfold discover that they're on "The Jimmy Camel Show", which looks back at the pairs actions from the past two series, but Penfold is suspicious. Title reference: You Only Live Twice NOTE: This is the last episode to air on Nickelodeon until Melted. Episodes after this aired on NickToons.
75	25	"Twysted Sister"	Aidan McAteer	Neil Mukopadhyay; Head Writer: Andrew Burrell	17 September 2018	7 January 2019
After she is accidentally regressed to a teen, Danger Mouse must summon Squawk's Twystyverse counterpart to talk some sense into her. Title reference: Twisted Sister NOTE: This is the first episode to air on Nicktoons until Melted.
76	26	"Grand Stressed Auto"	Aidan McAteer	Alex Collier; Head Writer: Andrew Burrell	18 September 2018	14 January 2019
Danger Mouse inherits the ancient but spritely MK3 car after the beloved MK4 gets jammed-up (literally). But Penfold is suspicious when the MK3 is determined to have DM all to himself. Title reference: Grand Theft Auto
77	27	"Clash of the Odd-esy"	Aidan McAteer	Andrew Burrell	19 September 2018	21 January 2019
Danger Mouse arrives in ancient Greece and befriends Zeus, who grants him godly powers. Title reference: Clash of the Gods and The Odyssey
78	28	"Henemy of the State"	Adian McAteer	Alex Collier	20 September 2018	28 January 2019
Danger Mouse is left gadget-less when an unappreciated Squawk leaves the Danger Agency to work for tech genius Elon Muskrat, unaware he is actually Greenback in disguise! Title reference: Enemy of the state
79	29	"For Your Insides Only"	Aidan McAteer	Mark Oswin and James Griffiths; Head Writer: Andrew Burrell	21 September 2018	4 February 2019
Penfold takes a trip inside Danger Mouse's body to save him from a deadly aversion to his own heroism. Title reference: For Your Eyes Only
80	30	"A Fistful of Penfolds"	Aidan McAteer	Andrew Burrell	24 September 2018	11 February 2019
The danger agents are at Squawk's super-secret wild-west testing facility, home to a society of Penbots, robots who have a rather familiar face. Title reference: A Fistful of Dollars
81	31	"Daylight Savings Crime"	Aidan McAteer	Tobi Wilson; Head Writer: Andrew Burrell	25 September 2018	11 March 2019
Danger Mouse and Penfold are celebrating another noisy victory, gleefully ringing Big Ben's bell when an over-excited Penfold falls, pushing the clock hand forward and causing the sun to go down prematurely, which a mysterious new villain plots to take advantage of! Title reference: Daylight Savings Time
82	32	"The Law of Beverages"	Aidan McAteer	Matt Owen; Head Writer: David Quantick	26 September 2018	18 February 2019
Baron Greenback brews a plot to steal every beverage on the planet and mix them all together, turning Earth's drinks into an un-drinkable, disgusting sludge whilst rendering all of DM's allies unable to help him! Title reference: The law of averages
83	33	"Licence to Care"	Aidan McAteer	Stephie Theodora and David Quantick; Head Writer: Andrew Burrell	27 September 2018	25 February 2019
A mishap on a mission leaves Danger Mouse confused - why is Penfold not talking to him? Title reference: Licence to Kill
84	34	"Force of Nature"	Aidan McAteer	Karen Reed; Head Writer: David Quantick	28 September 2018	4 March 2019
Danger Mouse's over-reliance on gadgets prompts Colonel K to send his top agent on a tech-free nature retreat, but unfortunately for DM, Delilah has also been sent there by Greenback due to her own overuse of her tech.
85	35	"No More Mr Ice Guy"	Aidan McAteer	Merrill Hagan	1 October 2018	18 March 2019
The Snowman is hired as Danger Mouse's new sidekick, leaving Penfold without a job. Title reference: No More Mr. Nice Guy Guest stars: Richard Ayoade as The Snowman and Christopher Eccleston as J. Woolington Sham
86	36	"Bot Battles"	Aidan McAteer	Danielle Ward; Head Writer: David Quantick	2 October 2018	25 March 2019
There's relief all around when Penfold's pilfering of Squawk's gadgets and clandestine late-night trips to shady warehouses turns out to be in preparation for his taking part in 'bot battles', which is actually a trap set by Megahurtz.
87	37	"Rodent Recall"	Aidan McAteer	Mark Oswin and James Griffiths; Head Writer: David Quantick	3 October 2018	1 April 2019
Danger Mouse and Penfold are in a training simulation when one of DM's flying kicks damages the holodeck with catastrophic consequences. They wake to find they have been in a three-year dream, that they aren't secret agents and work in IT instead, and the Danger Agency has been a figment of their imaginations! Whilst Penfold and Squawk quickly settle into a life of menial office work, DM struggles to accept life as Dane G. Mouse. Or is this boring new life not what it appears to be? Title reference: Total Recall Guest star: Richard Osman as Professor Strontium Jellyfishowitz NOTE: This is the last episode to air on Nicktoons.
88	38	"A Fear to Remember"	Aidan McAteer	Sarah Morgan; Head Writer: David Quantick	31 October 2018	25 October 2019
Danger Mouse faces the Queen of Weevils in a fearful Halloween Special. Title reference: A Night to Remember Guest star: Miranda Richardson as Queen of Weevils NOTE: This is the first episode to air on Nickelodeon (in production order).
89	39	"Melted"	Aidan McAteer	Ciaran Murtagh and Andrew Jones; Head Writer: David Quantick and Andrew Burrell	17 December 2018	28 September 2019
Danger Mouse reluctantly takes a role in Pink Dawn's musical re-enactment of "Melted" for a double-length, all-singing, all-dancing special. NOTE: This is the first episode to air on Nickelodeon (in air date order).
90	40	"We Aren't Family"	Aidan McAteer	David Quantick	18 February 2019	28 September 2019
Danger Mouse, Penfold and Squawk go undercover disguised as a family to find out why the world’s villains are heading to one holiday camp, Sydneyland. When Greenback shows up with Delilah, the team are convinced he is up to no good, but can’t find any evidence of wrongdoing. When Penfold enters Squawk and DM in a dance competition they discover the prize is the fabled Helmet of Power, an ultimate invention bent on destruction. Title reference: "We Are Family"
91	41	"Crouching Hamster Hidden Wagon"	Aidan McAteer	David Quantick and Mark Oswin; Head Writer: David Quantick	19 February 2019	28 September 2019
When a sudden urge to fly the Mark IV hits, Penfold leads a confused Danger Mouse to a farm, from which he claims to feel an unexplained magnetic pull. An entranced Penfold is met by a shadowy figure - Granny Penfold! Penfold recounts his childhood years on Granny’s farm, where he was trained in the ancient martial art of Farm Fu; a farming-based martial art. Granny needs Penfold’s help to retrieve the sacred Fung Farm Book of Farm Fu, which has fallen into the hands of her enemies, causing farm animals to turn evil and rise up against their owners. Title reference: Crouching Tiger, Hidden Dragon
92	42	"Danger-thon!"	Aidan McAteer	Christopher Gentile	20 February 2019	28 September 2019
The Danger Agency realises that a lack of accounting has left them bankrupt. Whilst the bailiffs are in collecting goods from HQ the team decide to hold a telethon, asking people to phone in and donate to order their favourite clips to be played. Their target is a whopping ten million pounds! Can they reach their target in time? And what clip is DM trying to hide? Title reference: Telethon
93	43	"Jam Session"	Aidan McAteer	Jordan Gershowitz; Head Writer: David Quantick	21 February 2019	28 September 2019
It is staff appreciation day at Danger HQ and Squawk and Danger Mouse have two very different ideas on where to go: Squawk wants to go to Cos Con and DM wants to go to Awesome World. Penfold has the deciding vote so the pair are busy trying to convince Penfold to pick their choice. With Penfold busy inventing tasks so they can earn his favour, no one has noticed that a jam spillage in the professor’s experiment has brought a sticky surprise to life - a super-sized jam monster which might just ruin all of their plans.
94	44	"Sharp As A Pin"	Aidan McAteer	Ciaran Murtagh and Andrew Jones; Head Writer: Andrew Burrell	25 February 2019	28 September 2019
An accidental sidekick swap leaves Danger Mouse with Pinfold, Penfold's cousin. Title reference: As sharp as a pin
95	45	"The Last Giraffe Warrior"	Aidan McAteer	Danielle Ward; Head Writer: Andrew Burrell	26 February 2019	28 September 2019
Penfold is asked to defend an alien planet from invasion. Title reference: The Last Starfighter
96	46	"Duplicate Mouse"	Aidan McAteer	Mark Oswin and James Griffiths; Head Writer: Andrew Burrell	27 February 2019	18 November 2019
Danger Mouse, Penfold, Squawk and Colonel K must team up with accidental duplicates of themselves to stop Big Head.
97	47	"The Supies"	Aidan McAteer	Christopher Gentile	28 February 2019	19 November 2019
Count Duckula is hosting the Supies awards show and the Danger Agents are all in attendance. Title reference: The Grammys
98	48	"Lost in Exaggeration"	Aidan McAteer	Emma Nisbet; Head Writer: Andrew Burrell	4 March 2019	20 November 2019
When the Danger Agency’s public approval ratings plummet, Colonel K brings in a truly out-of-this-world PR guru to help put things right. Alarmingly for Danger Mouse and Penfold, that guru turns out to be the galaxy’s biggest trickster – Quark! DM is soon won over after seeing Quark demonstrate his Exaggerator Device: an invention that spins even the most mundane event into an outrageously overblown display of awesomeness. With the help of the Exaggerator, DM’s popularity skyrockets to dizzying heights, but fame comes at a price. And when Quark starts making Danger Mouse look villainous, DM will have to convince the world he’s not the criminal everyone thinks he is. Title reference: Lost in Translation
99	49	"The World Is Full of Stuff"	Aidan McAteer	Lee Pressman; Head Writer: David Quantick	19 March 2019	21 November 2019
Stuff is going missing all over the world, but the team are distracted, fascinated by Squawk’s new Futuroid camera, which incredibly spits out snaps of future events. DM is aghast when the camera produces a photo of him and Squawk kissing! When Penfold is abducted by an alien tractor-beam, Squawk and Danger Mouse must overcome their mutual disgust to work together. Their search for Penfold leads them to Flarg, the alien who’s been nabbing the world’s missing items. Chained upside down, and with Flarg intent on stealing everything in existence, the situation looks hopeless. Title reference: The World Is Not Enough
