= Danger Mouse (1981 TV series) =

British animated television series

- Title card
- Genre: Action; Adventure; Comedy; Spy-fi
- Created by: Brian Cosgrove; Mark Hall
- Voices of: David Jason; Terry Scott; Edward Kelsey; Brian Trueman; Jimmy Hibbert
- Narrated by: David Jason
- Opening theme: "Danger Mouse" by Mike Harding
- Ending theme: "Danger Mouse" by Mike Harding
- Composer: Mike Harding
- Country of origin: United Kingdom
- Original language: English
- No. of series: 10
- No. of episodes: 89 (list of episodes)

Production
- Running time: 10–25 minutes
- Production companies: Cosgrove Hall Productions; Thames Television

Original release
- Network: ITV
- Release: 28 September 1981 – 19 March 1992

Related
- Count Duckula (spin-off); Danger Mouse (reboot)

Danger Mouse is a British animated television series produced by Cosgrove Hall Productions for Thames Television. It features the eponymous Danger Mouse, who worked as a secret agent and is a parody of British spy fiction, particularly the Danger Man series and James Bond. It originally ran from 28 September 1981 to 19 March 1992 on the ITV network.

The series spawned a spin-off show, Count Duckula, which aired between 1988 and 1993. A revival under the same name aired on CBBC from 2015 to 2019.

== Plot ==
Danger Mouse is a secret agent with the British Secret Service and, together with his sidekick Penfold, is repeatedly ordered by Colonel K, the head of the Secret Service, to save the world.

They work underneath Scotland Yard on Baker Street in London, hidden inside a red pillar box. Their arch-enemies are Baron Silas Greenback and his criminal organization, who try to achieve world domination by unconventional means such as stealing all famous buildings, or creating giant robots, etc.

A special role is played by the off-screen narrator, Isambard Sinclair, who accompanies the action by commenting on it sarcastically, talking to the characters or musing about his private life.

== Characters ==
=== Main ===
Danger Mouse, as seen in the title sequence

Penfold in "The Odd Ball Runaround"

- Danger Mouse (voiced by David Jason) – A white mouse with an eyepatch. Often called the world's greatest secret agent—so secret, in fact, that his codename has a codename. His catchphrases include "Good grief" when he becomes upset or shocked, "Penfold, shush" when his assistant makes a foolish remark. He was originally going to be brown; however, the creators thought that he and Penfold needed to be different colours.

Brian Cosgrove described Jason's portrayal as "His voice had the perfect mix of forcefulness, humour and gentleness. He was totally committed to doing voiceovers for silly cartoons, which warmed my heart, and we became great friends." Jason said "I wanted to make him sound believable. We decided he would be softly spoken, very British, very heroic, but also a bit of a coward. He'd save the world, but he'd also run for it!"

- Ernest Penfold (voiced by Terry Scott) – A timid, bespectacled hamster, and Danger Mouse's reluctant assistant and sidekick. He is often mistaken for a mole; however, Brian Cosgrove has stated Penfold is supposed to be a hamster. Penfold stands just over half the height of Danger Mouse, and always wears thick round glasses and a crumpled blue suit with a white shirt and a yellow and black striped tie. In the first episode, he is codenamed the Jigsaw "because when he is faced with a problem, he goes to pieces."^{S1 ep 1}

Brian Cosgrove came up with Penfold's character design when he was waiting for a meeting with Thames Television, and had drawn up "this little fellow with heavy glasses and a baggy suit" and then realized he had drawn his brother Denis, who worked for the Sunday Express and "who was bald with heavy black glasses".

- Colonel K (voiced by Edward Kelsey) – Danger Mouse's boss; often mistaken for a walrus, it was revealed in an issue of Look-in magazine that he is, in fact, a chinchilla. During the last two seasons, he became more absent-minded, tending to frustrate both Danger Mouse and Penfold with his tendency to ramble nonsense. A running gag in the later seasons is that he botches the usage of the phrase "over and out" multiple times.
- Baron Silas Greenback (voiced by Edward Kelsey) – The recurring villain and Danger Mouse's archenemy; a toad with a wheezy voice, although, sometimes, he was referred to as a frog. Known as Baron Greenteeth in the unbroadcast pilot episode. Commonly known as the "Terrible Toad". In the US, "greenback" is slang for dollar bill in many regions; this adds to the sense of his commercial greed. Allegedly, he turned to a life of crime as a schoolboy when other children stole his bicycle and let all the air out of its tyres.
- Stiletto Mafiosa (voiced by Brian Trueman) – Greenback's henchman; a crow. He always called Greenback "Barone", Italian for "Baron". In the original British version, he speaks with an Italian accent. When the show aired on Nickelodeon in the U.S., it was changed to a Cockney accent "to avoid offending Italian-Americans". In its U.S. VHS release and later in all subsequent TV reruns, his original Italian accent was restored. Greenback repeatedly berates and abuses him for mistakes.^{S5 ep 7} In series 5, he is more incompetent and klutzy that Greenback usually has to whack him with his walking stick, and in series 9, Greenback uses a "hit box" that whacks Stiletto on the head with a mallet.
- Nero (sounds provided by David Jason) – Greenback's pet. A fluffy white caterpillar (equivalent to the stereotypical white cat frequently associated with arch villains, particularly Ernst Stavro Blofeld). He is a non-speaking character, although his noises and laugh are supplied by David Jason's voice sped up. Readily understood by Greenback and, less frequently, by Stiletto. He does not have any superpowers, except In the season 5 episode "Nero Power", where he temporarily exhibits the ability of telekinesis.^{S5 ep 10} In the special features of Danger Mouse cartoons, audiences were informed that Nero is actually the mastermind of Greenback's schemes.
- The Narrator / Isambard Sinclair^{S6 ep "Bandits"} (voiced by David Jason) – The unseen narrator, who occasionally interacts with the characters, sometimes to the point of halting the plot for one reason or another. In a series 6 episode, he accidentally sends Danger Mouse and Penfold back in time with his broken mike. He often voices his disdain for the show and his job towards the end of the episode and through part of the closing credits.

=== Supporting ===
- Professor Heinrich Von Squawkencluck – An inventor mole, first appearing in the series where he was engaged in hormone experiments to grow chickens to enormous sizes.^{S1 ep 4} He invented the Mark III, Danger Mouse's flying car, and the Space Hopper, his personal spacecraft.^{S2 ep 1, S3 ep 1} He speaks in a broken German accent. Penfold is naturally leery of the professor, as he often winds up on the wrong side of his experiments.
- Flying Officer Buggles Pigeon – Another of Colonel K's agents, who comes to the aid of Danger Mouse and Penfold in the episode "Chicken Run", and appeared in several episodes afterward.^{S1 ep 4, 10}
- Agent 57 – A master of disguise, appearing initially as an earthworm. Agent 57 has disguised himself so often that he forgot his original appearance.^{S1 ep. 8} In the series 6 episode "The Spy Who Stayed In with a Cold", he gained the ability to change shape to resemble any character or animal whenever he sneezed, but when he shows Danger Mouse his original form, Danger Mouse is horrified.^{S6 ep. 6}
- Leatherhead – Greenback's other crow henchman. Even less intelligent than Stiletto, he appeared in several of the early episodes, where he spent most of his time reading comic books.^{S1 ep. 8, S3 ep. 4 "Ghost Bus"}
- Count Duckula (voiced by David Jason) – A fame-obsessed vampire duck who wants to appear in television. However, his utter lack of anything approaching talent makes his attempts to "entertain" rather terrifying (he has been known to use his "act" as a torture device). This resulted in a spin-off series, titled Count Duckula, starring the Count himself. The two versions of the character differ, however; the character featured in Danger Mouse is not a vegetarian, makes far greater use of his vampiric magic, and has an accent consisting of a lisp and a stutter, as well as occasional stuttering and duck-like squawks and quacks.
- J. J. Quark – A space alien who recurs in series 6. He speaks with a Scottish accent and claims possession of Earth based on a cosmic charter granted to his great-great-great-great-grandfather. He has a robot assistant named Grovell, who always grovels whenever his name is mentioned, much to Quark's frustration.
- Doctor Augustus P. Crumhorn III (voiced by Jimmy Hibbert): – A mad scientist wolf, he recurred as Danger Mouse's adversary starting in series 9. In the episode, "Penfold Transformed", he lists his full name as "Aloisius Julian Philibert Elphinstone Eugene Dionysis Barry Manilow Crumhorn", omitting both Augustus and the III. He and Greenback were at odds; once Crumhorn kidnapped Penfold and Penfold managed to escape simply because the two villains were too busy quarreling to notice his absence.

== Production ==
=== Development ===
The show was created by Mark Hall and Brian Cosgrove for their production company, Cosgrove Hall Films. Danger Mouse was based on Patrick McGoohan's lead role in Danger Man. The show was intended to have a more serious tone as seen in the pilot episode but Mike Harding (who wrote the music for the show) gave Brian Cosgrove and Mark Hall the idea to make the series silly. "The characters had got stuck in reality and were doing James Bond type things rooted in the solid real world," said Harding, "I argued that once you invented a Mouse Secret Agent then all of creation and a good chunk of not creation was his oyster. In other words we could be as barmy (crazy) as we wanted." In an interview with The Guardian, Cosgrove said "We reckoned a secret service mouse foiling the plans of an evil toad – Baron Silas Greenback – was suitably ridiculous."

Sometime around the early 1980s, a pilot episode for the show titled "The Mystery of the Lost Chord" was produced. This episode's footage was reused for in the series "Who stole the Bagpipes". In this episode, Danger Mouse was voiced by William Franklyn and Penfold by Peter Hawkins respectively. It's worthy to note that Danger Mouse was going to wear tuxedo which some scenes near the beginning of the pilot episode itself incorrectly depict Danger Mouse in this early design.

Cosgrove and Hall brought in Brian Trueman, who was working as an announcer on Granada TV, as the main writer for the series. For the voice of Danger Mouse, they picked David Jason after they saw him in Only Fools and Horses. For the voice of Penfold, they picked Terry Scott, who was known for the show Terry and June.

The show was expensive to make, an episode sometimes needing 2,000 drawings thus footage was reused while certain scenes were set in the North Pole or "in the dark" (i.e. black with eyeballs visible only, or, in Danger Mouse's case, simply one eyeball) as a cost-cutting measure. This time-and-money saving device was cheerfully admitted by both Brian Cosgrove, who conceived the character and the show, and Brian Trueman, who wrote almost all the scripts from the beginning.

== Reception and legacy ==
During the cartoon's first run, it reached a peak estimated viewing figure of 7.2 million viewers on 3 January 1983, with typical figures being around 3-4 million per episode.

In 2001, the show was ranked third in Channel 4's 100 Greatest Kids' TV Shows. In 2008, it was named the 62nd-best animated series by IGN, who considered it one of the first British cartoons to become popular with American audiences.

== Awards and nominations ==
Danger Mouse was nominated for 11 BAFTA awards during its original run, but did not win any.

=== BAFTA Films ===
A listing of British Academy Film Awards.

Year	Nominee / work	Award	Result
1984 (37th)	Danger Mouse series 4	Best Short Animation	Nominated
1985 (38th)	Danger Mouse series 5	Best Short Animation	Nominated
1986 (39th)	Danger Mouse series 6	Best Short Animation	Nominated
1987 (40th)	Danger Mouse series 7	Best Short Animation Film	Nominated

=== BAFTA TV ===
A listing of British Academy Television Awards.

Year	Nominee / work	Award	Result
1983	Danger Mouse series 2 or 3	Children's Programme - Entertainment / Drama	Nominated
1984	Danger Mouse series 4	Children's Programme - Entertainment / Drama	Nominated
1984	Danger Mouse series 4	Short Animation	Nominated
1985	Danger Mouse series 5	Short Animation	Nominated
1986	Danger Mouse series 6	Children's Programme - Entertainment / Drama	Nominated
1986	Danger Mouse series 6	Short Animation	Nominated
1987	Danger Mouse series 7	Short Animation	Nominated

=== Other awards ===
In 2012, Brian Cosgrove received a Special Award from the British Academy Children's Awards.

== In other media ==
=== Comics ===
A long-running comic strip adaptation, written by Angus P. Allan and illustrated by Arthur Ranson, ran in Look-in magazine and was syndicated in various other magazines. Ranson also provided some backdrops for the show. Allan and Ranson's work was highly appreciated by Cosgrove Hall, and the pair were awarded an "Oh Goodness!, Oh Crikey!" award in appreciation of their services. Some of Allan's stories were adapted for the show, although Allan's name was misspelled "Angus Allen". Artist Ranson later went on to illustrate Judge Anderson in the UK comic 2000 AD.

=== Video games ===
A series of video games based on the character also appeared. The first were Danger Mouse in Double Trouble and Danger Mouse in the Black Forest Chateau (both in 1984) followed by Danger Mouse in Making Whoopee! in 1985.

Two mobile games were published by ZED Worldwide; Danger Mouse: Quiz in 2010 and Danger Mouse in 2011.

=== Audiobooks ===
Some stories were also available as read-along cassettes with accompanying books. They were re-read by the cast for audio.

=== Merchandise ===
During its run, the show spawned a wide range of merchandise, including storybooks, hardback annuals, jigsaw puzzles, a Panini sticker album, View-Master reels, and of course, VHS releases. In the years since, products have continued to sell, often aimed at the now-adult audience who grew up with it, such as T-shirts, mugs, key rings, fridge magnets and posters. In 2006, to coincide with the show's 25th anniversary, Cosgrove Hall licensed rights to a number of companies to produce a range of new anniversary merchandise including Blues Clothing (women's and girls' underwear and sleepwear) and Concept 2 Creation (collectible figurines).

FremantleMedia launched a webshop run by Metrostar e-commerce where a wide variety of goods were for sale, including the CD Audio adaptation of two of the show's episodes using the original artists' voices, released by Steve Deakin-Davies: The Ambition Company.

=== Other appearances ===
- American musician & producer Danger Mouse chose his stage name as a reference to the show, initially performing in a mouse costume.
- In the 1989 film The BFG, which was also produced by Cosgrove-Hall, a Danger Mouse poster is shown above a boy's bed.

== Episodes ==
Series	Episodes	Originally released		
Series	Episodes	First released	Last released	Network
1	11	28 September 1981	14 December 1981	ITV
2	6	4 January 1982	12 February 1982	ITV
3	5	4 October 1982	1 November 1982	ITV
4	9	3 January 1983	23 March 1983	Children's ITV
5	10	20 February 1984	30 April 1984	Children's ITV
6	27	25 December 1984	26 December 1985	ITV
7	6	13 November 1986	18 December 1986	Children's ITV
8	2	20 February 1987	27 February 1987	Children's ITV
9	6	3 January 1991	7 February 1991	ITV
10	7	6 February 1992	19 March 1992	ITV

== Broadcast history ==
The series was transmitted on ITV via the CITV brand from 1981 to 1992. The main character has the initials 'DM' prominently emblazoned on his chest, which causes problems for those translating it into other languages, where a literal translation of the words 'Danger' and 'Mouse' do not have those initials. The Scots Gaelic version, for example, calls the show (and the lead) Donnie Murdo (two given names unconnected either with mice or danger). which was broadcast on STV – from 1990 to 1994 and again on BBC Alba in 2015. The series has also been broadcast on numerous channels such as Boomerang (2000–06) and BBC Two (2007–09).

He was Dzielna Mysz (brave mouse) in Polish, Dundermusen (Thundermouse) in Swedish, and Dare Dare Motus in French, "Dare Dare" being French slang for "as fast as possible". The Slovene translation omitted the DM initials entirely, however, dubbing Danger Mouse Hrabri mišek ('Brave Mouse').

In Australia, the show was first broadcast on ABC TV in 1982 it then moved to Network Ten in 1996. It was also the first British cartoon to break into Cheez TV, being shown on weekdays.

On 4 June 1984, the show was (along with Belle and Sebastian) the first animated show to appear on Nickelodeon in the United States, and quickly became the second-most popular show on the channel after You Can't Do That on Television, as it appealed to both children and adults with its quick-witted English humour. It was often described by American audiences as a British equivalent of The Rocky and Bullwinkle Show, due to its gentle satire of politics and outrageous plots.

In New Zealand, the show was broadcast on Channel 2 from 1983 to 1987.

== Revival ==
It was reported in 2013 that the series was under consideration for a revival, and in June 2014 it was announced that a new series was being made for broadcast on CBBC in 2015. The new series is produced by Boulder Media for FremantleMedia Kids. It is directed by Robert Cullen with Brian Cosgrove, one of the original creators, acting as creative consultant. Alexander Armstrong and actor Kevin Eldon voice Danger Mouse and Penfold, respectively; Dave Lamb takes the role of the narrator, whilst Stephen Fry plays Colonel K and Ed Gaughan takes over as Baron Greenback. Armstrong's Pointless co-host Richard Osman appears in the series as Professor Strontium Jellyfishowitz. John Oliver voices the character Dr Augustus P Crumhorn III and Lena Headey voices the character Jeopardy Mouse, a character newly introduced into this series. This series aired on Netflix in the US. Kevin Eldon describes the animation style as 'much the same as the original'. The first episode aired on 28 September 2015.

Jazwares is the master toy partner, Penguin Books published a range of printed books, including story books, official guides, sticker books, novelty books, annuals and electronic titles and D.C. Thomson & Co. published a monthly magazine with comic strips, puzzles, fact files, poster and competitions.

== Spin-off ==
- Count Duckula (1988–1993)

== Notes ==
- "Sx Ep. y" is shortened form for series x and episode y in the original Danger Mouse TV series
