= Danger Mouse (2015 TV series) =

British-Irish-Canadian animated series

- Genre: Action; Adventure; Comedy; Spy-fi
- Created by: Brian Cosgrove
- Based on: Danger Mouse by: Brian Cosgrove; Mark Hall
- Developed by: Brian Cosgrove
- Directed by: Robert Cullen (2015–17); Aidan McAteer (2018–19)
- Voices of: Alexander Armstrong; Kevin Eldon; Stephen Fry; Ed Gaughan; Shauna Macdonald; Dave Lamb; Marc Silk; Rasmus Hardiker; Kayvan Novak; Morwenna Banks
- Narrated by: Dave Lamb
- Theme music composer: Mike Harding
- Opening theme: "Danger Mouse" by Sanj Sen and Phillipa Alexander
- Ending theme: "Danger Mouse" (Short Version) by Sanj Sen and Phillipa Alexander
- Composer: Sanj Sen
- Countries of origin: United Kingdom; Ireland; Canada (2018–19)
- Original language: English
- No. of series: 2
- No. of episodes: 99 (list of episodes)

Production
- Executive producers: Chapman Maddox; Bob Higgins; Tim Searle; Brian Cosgrove (2015–16)
- Running time: 11 minutes 22 minutes (special episodes only)
- Production companies: FremantleMedia Kids & Family Entertainment (2015–17); Boulder Media; Boat Rocker Media (2018–19); CBBC Production

Original release
- Network: CBBC
- Release: 28 September 2015 – 5 March 2019

Related
- Danger Mouse (original series)

Danger Mouse is a British children's animated television series, produced by FremantleMedia Kids & Family Entertainment and Boulder Media, though it started being produced by Boat Rocker Media in 2018 after they acquired FremantleMedia Kids & Family Entertainment. The series, which is a reimagining of the 1981 television series of the same name, sees the return of Danger Mouse, the self-proclaimed "World's Greatest Secret Agent", and his hamster sidekick Penfold, who protect the world from a variety of dangers. With help from his boss Colonel K and the genius scientist Professor Squawkencluck, Danger Mouse is equipped to defeat his nemesis, Baron Silas von Greenback.

Plans for a revival of Danger Mouse were first considered in 2013, before being announced the following year, with original series co-creator Brian Cosgrove helping to develop the series. The main cast were announced in 2014, with more cast members being announced later in the year. The series premiered on CBBC on 28 September 2015, more than 20 years after the end of the show's original run.

Within three weeks of the series running, Danger Mouse achieved 2.4 million viewers and became the highest rated show on the CBBC channel. On 19 May 2016, the series was commissioned for a second series and on 4 April 2017, for a third series of 26 episodes.

Danger Mouse won the Best Sound Design and Best Music awards at the 2017 and 2019 Irish Animation Awards. Aidan McAteer also picked up the award for 'Best Director' at the 2019 awards.

== Production ==
In 2013, FremantleMedia confirmed to Broadcast that an updated version of the series was being considered, and in June 2014 it was announced that a new series, consisting of 52 episodes, was being made for broadcast on CBBC in 2015. The series is produced by Boulder Media for Boat Rocker Media, who acquired FremantleMedia's kids and family entertainment business in January 2018.

It is directed by Robert Cullen, with Brian Cosgrove, one of the original creators, as a creative consultant. Alexander Armstrong and Kevin Eldon voice Danger Mouse and Penfold, Dave Lamb takes the role of the narrator, whilst Stephen Fry and Ed Gaughan take on the roles of Colonel K and Baron Greenback respectively. Armstrong's Pointless co-host Richard Osman also appears in the series as Professor Strontium Jellyfishowitz. It was also announced that John Oliver would voice Dr Augustus P. Crumhorn IV and Lena Headey would voice new character Jeopardy Mouse. According to Eldon, the animation style is 'much the same as the original'. The series is animated in Toon Boom Harmony, as the animators thought that Flash was too limited.

The series was picked up by Netflix in several countries, including the United States. In August 2019, CBS All Access acquired the US streaming rights to the series.

Several of the characters' voices were recorded at Windmill Lane Studios in Dublin, Ireland.

== Characters ==
- Danger Mouse (voiced by Alexander Armstrong) is the main protagonist and title character, Danger Mouse is the world's greatest secret agent. Supremely confident in his abilities, Danger Mouse can be narcissistic, which sometimes leads him to take actions that create risky situations.
- Ernest Penfold (voiced by Kevin Eldon) is a timid and neurotic hamster who works as Danger Mouse's assistant and is his best friend.
- Colonel K (voiced by Stephen Fry) is a chinchilla who serves as Danger Mouse and Penfold's boss. He has a holographic double which seems to be a sentient lifeform.
- Professor Squawkencluck (voiced by Shauna Macdonald) is a Scottish chicken scientist who invents gadgets for Danger Mouse to use on his missions. This version of Squawkencluck is depicted as a female bird, while her original counterpart from the classic series was a male German-accented mole.
- Baron Silas Von Greenback (voiced by Ed Gaughan) is an evil, German toad mastermind who is Danger Mouse's archenemy.
- Nero (vocal effects by Marc Silk) is Greenback's pet fluffy white caterpillar, whose intelligence and duplicity is often underestimated.
- Stiletto Mafiosa (voiced by Dave Lamb) is Greenback's dim-witted Italian crow henchman.
- The Narrator (voiced by Dave Lamb), as with the original series, an unseen character, frequently breaks the fourth wall, interacting with both the viewer and the other characters and often finds himself in danger from the episode's antagonist.

== Episodes ==
Series	Episodes	Originally released	
Series	Episodes	First released	Last released
1	50 (2 specials)	28 September 2015	20 October 2016
2	49 (3 specials)	14 June 2017	19 March 2019

== Home media ==
The first DVD of the series was released on 2 November 2015. The whole of series 1 has been released across 6 DVDs, with 1 being released in 2015, 2 in 2016 and 3 in 2017. All 2015 episodes have been released for digital download through Amazon and other services.

Region 2
DVD title	Series	Episode count	Total running time	Release date(s)	Episodes
Danger Mouse: Mission Improbable	1	7	88 mins approx	2 November 2015	"Danger Mouse Begins... Again" "Planet of the Toilets" "Danger at C-Level" "The Other Day the Earth Stood Still" "Welcome to Danger World" "Big Head Awakens" "Greenfinger"
Danger Mouse: Quark Games	1	9	99 mins approx	15 August 2016	"Quark Games" "Pink Dawn" "The World Wide Spider" "Jeopardy Mouse" "The Return of Danger K" "Danger Fan" "Big Penfold" "The Unusual Suspects" "The Inventor Preventor"
Danger Mouse: Merry Christmouse	1	7	89 mins approx	24 October 2016	"The Snowman Cometh" "#Sinister Mouse" "There's No Place Like Greenback" "Happy Boom Day!" "Frankensquawk's Monster" "Escape From Big Head" "Megahurtz Attacks"
Danger Mouse: The Mouse Awakens	1	9	105 mins approx	6 February 2017	"The Hamster Effect" "The Good, the Baaaaa and the Ugly" "Attack of the Clowns" "Cheesemageddon" "Send in the Clones" "Hail Hydrant" "Wicked Leaks" "Queen of Weevils" "Masters of the Twystyverse"
Danger Mouse: The Agents Who Saved Summer	1	10	105 mins approx	17 July 2017	"Never Say Clever Again" "Tomorrow Never Comes" "Half the World Is Enough" "Danger Is Forever" "The Spy Who Came in With a Cold" "Agent 58" "Thanks a Minion!" "High School Inedible" "Mousefall" "Mouse Rise"
Danger Mouse: From Duck to Dawn	1	8	93 mins approx	18 September 2017	"From Duck to Dawn" "The Duckula Show" "Very Important Penfold" "The Cute Shall Inherit the Earth" "All 5 It" "Dream Worrier" "The Confidence Trick" "Sir Danger de Mouse"

== Other media and merchandise ==
=== Video games ===
In July 2017, it was announced that an official Danger Mouse mobile game was in development by 9th Impact and the game Danger Mouse: The Danger Games was released on iOS App Store and Google Play Store in August 2017. The game is a multiplayer racing battle with card trading. It was nominated for Best Mobile Game at the 2017 Best of Gamescom awards, but lost to Metroid: Samus Returns. It was also nominated for "Best Racing Game" at The Independent Game Developers' Association Awards 2018, but lost to F1 2017. The game was released for the Nintendo Switch on September 13, 2018.

=== Stage adaptation ===
It was announced in December 2016 that there would be a live stage show based on the TV series in 2017. The show was produced by FremantleMedia who created the series for CBBC and is also produced by Butlins holiday park where it toured around all three of its parks from Easter 2017 until January 2018. The show is titled Robo Mop. The stage show returned in 2018.

=== Merchandising ===
Jazwares is the master toy partner, Penguin Books publish a range of printed books, including story books, official guides, sticker books, novelty books, annuals and electronic titles and D.C. Thomson & Co. have started publishing a monthly magazine (from July 2016) with comic strips, puzzles, fact files, poster and competitions. Marc Silk read Danger Mouse audiobooks, the first one being released on 2 June 2016. A Danger Mouse Scribble Book was also released on 2 June 2016, as well as Sticky Situations! Colouring Book and License to Chill.
