= Harry Middleton (nature writer) =

American nature writer (1949–1993)

Harry Middleton (December 28, 1949 – July 28, 1993) was a southern American nature writer, most noted for his book The Earth is Enough.

== Biography ==
Little is known about Middleton's life other than the information he offered through his novels. Middleton died in the summer of 1993 from a suspected brain aneurysm while swimming at a pool with his children. He was a garbage man at the time of his death.

He had previously worked as an outdoors columnist for Southern Living magazine , but in his book, The Bright Country, he writes off his sudden dismissal from the magazine. Prior to working at Southern Living, Middleton wrote in the early 1980s for a magazine called Louisiana Life. His column of personal observations, entitled "Louisiana At Large," included essays with titles such as "The Day the Spider Died," and "The Boy's First Brush with Education."

Middleton was an English major at Northwestern State University in Natchitoches, Louisiana, and earned a master's degree in Western history at Louisiana State University in 1973. His thesis: Frontier outpost: a history of Fort Jesup, Louisiana, 1822-1846.

He lived in New Orleans, where he wrote about food, art, music and books for Figaro, an alternative newspaper. He later moved to Birmingham.

Middleton is widely considered to be an outstanding American fishing writer. His signed books command high prices and are collectable. His first was published in 1989.

== Texts ==
Middleton published the following books:

- The Earth is Enough July, 1989 by Simon & Schuster
- On the Spine of Time March, 1991 by Simon & Schuster
- The Starlight Creek Angling Society January, 1992 by Meadow Run Press, Inc
- Rivers of Memory February, 1993 by Pruett
- The Bright Country August, 1993 by Simon & Schuster
- In that Sweet Country; uncollected writings of Harry Middleton July, 2010 by Skyhorse Publishing and Ron Ellis

== Accomplishments ==
- Friends of American Writers Award
- Outdoor Writers Association of America Best Book Award
- Southeastern Outdoor Press Best Book Award
