= List of Danger Mouse (1981 TV series) episodes =

The following is an episode list for the children's animated television series Danger Mouse. The show is about the title character of the same name (David Jason) and his sidekick Ernest Penfold (Terry Scott) defeating villains who attempt to cause havoc around the planet.

The show was made by Cosgrove Hall Films and first shown on ITV during its weekday lunchtime or afternoon children's programming. 161 episodes were made which were broadcast between 1981 and 1992. Later, VHS and DVD releases edited the 5-part stories together as single episodes, to total 89 episodes. The episode order is controversial because stories were often initially transmitted some years after the rest of the series to which they theoretically belonged, often forming part of a 'repeats series'. The US Region 1 DVD releases present the episodes in the UK broadcast order.

== Series overview ==
Series	Episodes	Originally released		
Series	Episodes	First released	Last released	Network
1	11	28 September 1981	14 December 1981	ITV
2	6	4 January 1982	12 February 1982	ITV
3	5	4 October 1982	1 November 1982	ITV
4	9	3 January 1983	23 March 1983	Children's ITV
5	10	20 February 1984	30 April 1984	Children's ITV
6	27	25 December 1984	26 December 1985	ITV
7	6	13 November 1986	18 December 1986	Children's ITV
8	2	20 February 1987	27 February 1987	Children's ITV
9	6	3 January 1991	7 February 1991	ITV
10	7	6 February 1992	19 March 1992	ITV

== Episodes ==
=== Series 1 (1981) ===
Series 1 episodes are 11 minutes each, and originally aired on Mondays and Wednesdays with no commercial breaks in the UK.

No. overall	No. in series	Title	Directed by	Written by	Original release date	U.S. air date	Prod. code
1	1	"Rogue Robots"	Brian Cosgrove	Mike Harding and Brian Trueman	28 September 1981	23 December 1981 (Sneak Peek); 8 January 1982	075-104
Danger Mouse discovers that Baron Greenback is behind a wave of attack robots that have been going after agents that work with DM.
2	2	"Who Stole the Bagpipes"	Brian Cosgrove	Mike Harding and Brian Trueman	30 September 1981	8 January 1982	075-102
Danger Mouse and Penfold travel to Scotland to keep Greenback from destroying the world with music from all the bagpipes in the world. This episode was the modified version of the 2nd pilot.
3	3	"Trouble with Ghosts"	Brian Cosgrove	Mike Harding and Brian Trueman	5 October 1981	29 October 1982	075-112
Greenback captures Colonel K and has the Colonel send Danger Mouse and Penfold on holiday to a haunted castle in Transylvania.
4	4	"Chicken Run"	Brian Cosgrove	Mike Harding and Brian Trueman	7 October 1981	15 January 1982	075-106
Greenback steals a growth serum from Professor von Squawkencluck and with it creates giant chickens to take over the world once and for all. And for once, Penfold saves the day!
5	5	"The Martian Misfit"	Brian Cosgrove	Mike Harding and Brian Trueman	12 October 1981	15 January 1982	075-105
Greenback creates a 'Martian' to keep Danger Mouse busy while he sets out on a crime spree which does not last very long!
6	6	"The Dream Machine"	Brian Cosgrove	Mike Harding and Brian Trueman	14 October 1981	22 January 1982	075-107
Greenback puts Danger Mouse and Penfold in his dream machine, where Penfold's random thoughts become reality, usually to the detriment of Danger Mouse.
7	7	"Lord of the Bungle"	Brian Cosgrove	Mike Harding and Brian Trueman	19 October 1981	12 February 1982	075-110
During an investigation where Danger Mouse and Penfold try to find out why elephants are being turned into sugar cubes, a fall causes Penfold to act weird and do a Tarzan yell that summons elephants to stampede the area.
8	8	"Die Laughing"	Brian Cosgrove	Mike Harding and Brian Trueman	21 October 1981	5 February 1982	075-108
Greenback uses a spray on the world's leaders to cause them to laugh.
9	9	"The World of Machines"	Brian Cosgrove	Mike Harding and Brian Trueman	26 October 1981	29 January 1982	075-113
Greenback kidnaps Penfold to lure Danger Mouse into a spaceship and send both of them to a planet ruled by old fashioned looking machines.
10	10	"Ice Station Camel"	Brian Cosgrove	Mike Harding and Brian Trueman	28 October 1981	19 February 1982	075-111
Danger Mouse must stop Greenback who has placed a device at the North Pole to stop the Earth's rotation and cancel gravity. Title reference: Ice Station Zebra
11	11	"A Plague of Pyramids"	Brian Cosgrove	Mike Harding and Brian Trueman	14 December 1981	22 January 1982	075-103
Greenback has placed a large number of sand pyramids all over England, threatening to sink the island Danger Mouse travels to the Sahara Desert to stop him.

=== Series 2 (1982) ===
Series 2 stories were originally each aired in five 5-minute segments over five consecutive days. VHS and DVD releases usually see these episodes edited together as one 25-minute episode, although in reality, these omnibus episodes run closer to 17–19 minutes as they lose David Jason's 'cliffhanger' narration over the "To be continued..." captions. On the VHS and DVD releases, the "Episode 1" suffix in the title card after the opening credits has often been left unaltered. The UK version compresses them to 11 minutes, but the US DVD releases retain the original 5-min segment format.

No. overall	No. in series	Title	Directed by	Written by	Original release date	US air date	Prod. code
12	1	"Custard"	Brian Cosgrove	Brian Trueman	4 January 1982	23 April 1982	027-201
12	1	"Custard"	Brian Cosgrove	Brian Trueman	5 January 1982	23 April 1982	027-201
12	1	"Custard"	Brian Cosgrove	Brian Trueman	6 January 1982	23 April 1982	027-201
12	1	"Custard"	Brian Cosgrove	Brian Trueman	7 January 1982	23 April 1982	027-201
12	1	"Custard"	Brian Cosgrove	Brian Trueman	8 January 1982	23 April 1982	027-201
The Earth is flooded with instant custard. Danger Mouse and Penfold travel to outer space to find the Custard Mite of Glut, a small creature that can eat up the custard, but the planet that houses the Mite is controlled by armoured aliens.
13	2	"Close Encounters of the Absurd Kind"	Brian Cosgrove	Brian Trueman	11 January 1982	30 April 1982	027-202
13	2	"Close Encounters of the Absurd Kind"	Brian Cosgrove	Brian Trueman	12 January 1982	30 April 1982	027-202
13	2	"Close Encounters of the Absurd Kind"	Brian Cosgrove	Brian Trueman	13 January 1982	30 April 1982	027-202
13	2	"Close Encounters of the Absurd Kind"	Brian Cosgrove	Brian Trueman	14 January 1982	30 April 1982	027-202
13	2	"Close Encounters of the Absurd Kind"	Brian Cosgrove	Brian Trueman	15 January 1982	30 April 1982	027-202
When Baron Greenback threatens to take down a tracking station, Danger Mouse and Penfold head to the Bermuda Triangle to stop him. But space aliens abduct them, hoping to probe them for further research. The episode title is a reference to the film Close Encounters of the Third Kind
14	3	"The Duel"	Brian Cosgrove	Brian Trueman	18 January 1982	7 May 1982	027-203
14	3	"The Duel"	Brian Cosgrove	Brian Trueman	19 January 1982	7 May 1982	027-203
14	3	"The Duel"	Brian Cosgrove	Brian Trueman	20 January 1982	7 May 1982	027-203
14	3	"The Duel"	Brian Cosgrove	Brian Trueman	21 January 1982	7 May 1982	027-203
14	3	"The Duel"	Brian Cosgrove	Brian Trueman	22 January 1982	7 May 1982	027-203
Baron Greenback challenges Danger Mouse to a duel, where if Danger Mouse wins, Greenback will go straight and be good, but if Greenback wins, Danger Mouse has to quit his job. The duel consists of a series of challenges including a vehicle race, a dark ride / haunted house, a shooting gallery, a high striker carnival game, and a roller coaster. But many of the challenges are rigged with booby traps in Greenback's favor.
15	4	"The Day of the Suds"	Brian Cosgrove	Brian Trueman	25 January 1982	14 May 1982	027-204
15	4	"The Day of the Suds"	Brian Cosgrove	Brian Trueman	26 January 1982	14 May 1982	027-204
15	4	"The Day of the Suds"	Brian Cosgrove	Brian Trueman	27 January 1982	14 May 1982	027-204
15	4	"The Day of the Suds"	Brian Cosgrove	Brian Trueman	28 January 1982	14 May 1982	027-204
15	4	"The Day of the Suds"	Brian Cosgrove	Brian Trueman	29 January 1982	14 May 1982	027-204
Washing machines from all over London have busted out of their residences and are now under the control of Baron Greenback, who orders them to assemble and to attack Danger Mouse. As Danger Mouse and Penfold evade the washers, they hide out at a junkyard and discover that the washers can be disabled by activating a large electromagnet to attract and drop them into a pit. However, the mass amounts of washers then transform into a large sudsy monster.
16	5	"The Bad Luck Eye of the Little Yellow God"	Brian Cosgrove	Brian Trueman	1 February 1982	21 May 1982	027-205
16	5	"The Bad Luck Eye of the Little Yellow God"	Brian Cosgrove	Brian Trueman	2 February 1982	21 May 1982	027-205
16	5	"The Bad Luck Eye of the Little Yellow God"	Brian Cosgrove	Brian Trueman	3 February 1982	21 May 1982	027-205
16	5	"The Bad Luck Eye of the Little Yellow God"	Brian Cosgrove	Brian Trueman	4 February 1982	21 May 1982	027-205
16	5	"The Bad Luck Eye of the Little Yellow God"	Brian Cosgrove	Brian Trueman	5 February 1982	21 May 1982	027-205
Baron Greenback has stolen a gem that is used to shoot a ray beam at people which results in them having extremely bad luck. Danger Mouse manages to get it and attempts to give it back to the original owners who do not really want it back.
17	6	"The Four Tasks of Danger Mouse"	Brian Cosgrove	Brian Trueman	8 February 1982	28 May 1983	027-209
17	6	"The Four Tasks of Danger Mouse"	Brian Cosgrove	Brian Trueman	9 February 1982	28 May 1983	027-209
17	6	"The Four Tasks of Danger Mouse"	Brian Cosgrove	Brian Trueman	10 February 1982	28 May 1983	027-209
17	6	"The Four Tasks of Danger Mouse"	Brian Cosgrove	Brian Trueman	11 February 1982	28 May 1983	027-209
17	6	"The Four Tasks of Danger Mouse"	Brian Cosgrove	Brian Trueman	12 February 1982	28 May 1983	027-209
Greenback kidnaps Penfold to get Danger Mouse to bring him four ingredients needed for an evil spell to take over the world: The hair of a yeti, straw from a witch's broom, a piece of the London fog monster, and the tail feathers of Count Duckula. The title is a reference to the twelve Labours of Hercules

=== Series 3 (1982) ===
The first three stories were originally each aired in five 5-minute segments over five consecutive days. The US DVD releases retain the original 5-min segment format. The fourth and fifth stories were single 11-minute segments and aired on Mondays; some sources (including iTunes UK and The Guinness Book of Classic British TV) list these episodes as belonging to the first series. This would appear to be supported by the fact that these final two episodes have the series 1 credit sequence with its original title card and the same series 1 animation. (The title card was changed to the more familiar logo from series 2 onwards.) According to the production codes, this is still technically series 2.

No. overall	No. in series	Title	Directed by	Written by	Original release date	Rehydrated air date	Prod. code
18	1	"The Invasion of Colonel 'K'"	Brian Cosgrove	Brian Trueman	4 October 1982	25 February 1983	027-206
18	1	"The Invasion of Colonel 'K'"	Brian Cosgrove	Brian Trueman	5 October 1982	25 February 1983	027-206
18	1	"The Invasion of Colonel 'K'"	Brian Cosgrove	Brian Trueman	6 October 1982	25 February 1983	027-206
18	1	"The Invasion of Colonel 'K'"	Brian Cosgrove	Brian Trueman	7 October 1982	25 February 1983	027-206
18	1	"The Invasion of Colonel 'K'"	Brian Cosgrove	Brian Trueman	8 October 1982	25 February 1983	027-206
Baron Greenback uses a shrink ray to enter Colonel K's body to learn all of the Colonel's secrets. Danger Mouse and Penfold follow, but they get diverted because Greenback changed some of the signs. They also have to deal with the body guarding cells.
19	2	"Danger Mouse Saves the World... Again"	Brian Cosgrove	Brian Trueman	11 October 1982	4 March 1984	027-208
19	2	"Danger Mouse Saves the World... Again"	Brian Cosgrove	Brian Trueman	12 October 1982	4 March 1984	027-208
19	2	"Danger Mouse Saves the World... Again"	Brian Cosgrove	Brian Trueman	13 October 1982	4 March 1984	027-208
19	2	"Danger Mouse Saves the World... Again"	Brian Cosgrove	Brian Trueman	14 October 1982	4 March 1984	027-208
19	2	"Danger Mouse Saves the World... Again"	Brian Cosgrove	Brian Trueman	15 October 1982	4 March 1984	027-208
Danger Mouse and Penfold try to stop Baron Greenback from destroying all the world's signposts. They travel to an island in the Pacific Ocean where Greenback is holding his annual conference of evil-doers. The villains thwart Danger Mouse's every move at the touch of a button. Danger Mouse gets captured and placed on a table where a machine is going to drain his brain's thoughts. Penfold is captured as well. Just as Danger Mouse is about to lose for good, he wakes up as the whole thing was a dream, but then knows exactly what will happen next.
20	3	"The Odd Ball Runaround"	Brian Cosgrove	Brian Trueman	18 October 1982	11 March 1983	027-207
20	3	"The Odd Ball Runaround"	Brian Cosgrove	Brian Trueman	19 October 1982	11 March 1983	027-207
20	3	"The Odd Ball Runaround"	Brian Cosgrove	Brian Trueman	20 October 1982	11 March 1983	027-207
20	3	"The Odd Ball Runaround"	Brian Cosgrove	Brian Trueman	21 October 1982	11 March 1983	027-207
20	3	"The Odd Ball Runaround"	Brian Cosgrove	Brian Trueman	22 October 1982	11 March 1983	027-207
Danger Mouse and Penfold travel to Australia where they pick up top secret plans from an agent rat in the form of a rugby ball. Penfold gets distracted by a boomerang and is later picked up by large bird of prey. Penfold drops the ball into a castle, which happens to be controlled by Baron Greenback. Danger Mouse attempts multiple times to get into the castle but fails, leaving Penfold to dramatically grieve at the supposed loss. They get into the castle but Penfold is captured and Danger Mouse is shot out to a mountain top. Eventually Danger Mouse is able to rescue Penfold and secure the ball, only to find out later from Colonel K that the ball was actually a decoy meant to be given to Greenback.
21	4	"The Strange Case of the Ghost Bus"	Brian Cosgrove	Mike Harding and Brian Trueman	25 October 1982	23 December 1981 (Sneak Peek); 26 February 1982	075-101
Danger Mouse and Penfold head to the Indian Ocean to investigate several ship sinkings caused by "ghost buses". The buses turn out to be ice blocks shaped like a London bus created by Baron Greenback.
22	5	"The Trip to America"	Brian Cosgrove	Mike Harding and Brian Trueman	1 November 1982	March 5, 1982	075-109
Historic buildings such as Tower of London, Eiffel Tower, Kremlin and the Empire State Building have disappeared. Danger Mouse and Penfold travel to the United States and meet a cowboy named Texas Jack McGraw who got the Tower of London as a result of Baron Greenback's shrink ray. Danger Mouse and Penfold are zapped by Greenback's shrink ray and captured by Nero. Native Americans have captured Greenback, Nero, and Stiletto. Jack rescues Danger Mouse and Penfold, and they in turn rescue Greenback and friends.

=== Series 4 (1983) ===
Series 4 stories were originally each aired in five 5-minute segments over five consecutive days. This series was the longest-lived with 45 episodes. VHS and DVD releases usually see these episodes edited together as one 25-minute episode, although in reality, these omnibus episodes run closer to 20 minutes as they lose David Jason's 'cliffhanger' narration over the "To be continued..." captions. On the VHS and DVD releases, the "Episode 1" suffix in the title card after the opening credits has often been left unaltered. The US DVD releases retain the original 5-min segment format.

No. overall	No. in series	Title	Directed by	Written by	Original release date	US air date	Prod. code
23	1	"The Wild, Wild, Goose Chase"	Brian Cosgrove	Story by : Keith Scoble; Screenplay by : Brian Trueman	3 January 1983	18 March 1983	156-301
23	1	"The Wild, Wild, Goose Chase"	Brian Cosgrove	Story by : Keith Scoble; Screenplay by : Brian Trueman	4 January 1983	18 March 1983	156-301
23	1	"The Wild, Wild, Goose Chase"	Brian Cosgrove	Story by : Keith Scoble; Screenplay by : Brian Trueman	5 January 1983	18 March 1983	156-301
23	1	"The Wild, Wild, Goose Chase"	Brian Cosgrove	Story by : Keith Scoble; Screenplay by : Brian Trueman	6 January 1983	18 March 1983	156-301
23	1	"The Wild, Wild, Goose Chase"	Brian Cosgrove	Story by : Keith Scoble; Screenplay by : Brian Trueman	7 January 1983	18 March 1983	156-301
Danger Mouse and Penfold are in Hong Kong where they are trying to arrest Baron Greenback. They find a voice-activated computerised device that gives them directions to Greenback's hideout, but in order to get there they have to evade the Hong Kong Tong gang. They then head to a desert pyramid but are chased away by a large mummy. Danger Mouse gets stuck in quicksand while Penfold chases desert mirages. They follow the locator to a jungle and later to the North Pole. It turns out Greenback has used the locator to send the heroes on a wild goose chase all over the world.
24	2	"The Return of Count Duckula"	Brian Cosgrove	Brian Trueman	10 January 1983	25 March 1983	156-302
24	2	"The Return of Count Duckula"	Brian Cosgrove	Brian Trueman	11 January 1983	25 March 1983	156-302
24	2	"The Return of Count Duckula"	Brian Cosgrove	Brian Trueman	12 January 1983	25 March 1983	156-302
24	2	"The Return of Count Duckula"	Brian Cosgrove	Brian Trueman	13 January 1983	25 March 1983	156-302
24	2	"The Return of Count Duckula"	Brian Cosgrove	Brian Trueman	14 January 1983	25 March 1983	156-302
Baron Greenback gets Count Duckula to use his hypnosis powers to turn members of the British Parliament into show-biz crazy entertainers. In exchange, Count Duckula will get a television show. Danger Mouse and Penfold try to foil his plans, at first by repelling him with bad eggs and rotten cabbage, but Duckula eventually captures the two and forces them to watch his variety television show. Agent 57 disguises as an American talent scout to finally give Duckula his big break.
25	3	"Demons Aren't Dull"	Brian Cosgrove	Story by : Keith Scoble; Screenplay by : Brian Trueman	17 January 1983	1 April 1983	156-303
25	3	"Demons Aren't Dull"	Brian Cosgrove	Story by : Keith Scoble; Screenplay by : Brian Trueman	18 January 1983	1 April 1983	156-303
25	3	"Demons Aren't Dull"	Brian Cosgrove	Story by : Keith Scoble; Screenplay by : Brian Trueman	19 January 1983	1 April 1983	156-303
25	3	"Demons Aren't Dull"	Brian Cosgrove	Story by : Keith Scoble; Screenplay by : Brian Trueman	20 January 1983	1 April 1983	156-303
25	3	"Demons Aren't Dull"	Brian Cosgrove	Story by : Keith Scoble; Screenplay by : Brian Trueman	21 January 1983	1 April 1983	156-303
Danger Mouse and Penfold must face the demon of the fourth dimension. Danger Mouse is transported onto a This Was Your Life television show, where they highlight several clips from previous episodes that show him in embarrassing and incompetent situations. Danger Mouse is distressed and wants to resign, but Colonel K. assures him that the show never transmitted. When the demon transports the famous buildings to his own dimension using a time corridor, Danger Mouse and Penfold head back to the fourth dimension and deal with the surreal weirdness there. They eventually trick the demon into entering between two gateway doors, and have him shipped to Alpha Centauri.
26	4	"150 Million Years Lost"	Brian Cosgrove	Story by : Keith Scoble; Screenplay by : Brian Trueman	11 April 1983	1 July 1983	156-304
26	4	"150 Million Years Lost"	Brian Cosgrove	Story by : Keith Scoble; Screenplay by : Brian Trueman	12 April 1983	1 July 1983	156-304
26	4	"150 Million Years Lost"	Brian Cosgrove	Story by : Keith Scoble; Screenplay by : Brian Trueman	13 April 1983	1 July 1983	156-304
26	4	"150 Million Years Lost"	Brian Cosgrove	Story by : Keith Scoble; Screenplay by : Brian Trueman	14 April 1983	1 July 1983	156-304
26	4	"150 Million Years Lost"	Brian Cosgrove	Story by : Keith Scoble; Screenplay by : Brian Trueman	15 April 1983	1 July 1983	156-304
Professor Squakencluck shows off his time machine. However, when Penfold gets too close to the machine's targeted area, he is sucked into the past, 150 million years ago, in exchange for a dinosaur egg. Danger Mouse heads back to look for him. While Squakencluck tries to fix his machine, a Diplodocus who got swapped for Danger Mouse becomes impatient and busts out of the lab. Penfold encounters his ancestors. The prehistoric age gets mixed with the middle ages, causing Danger Mouse to meet an armoured knight. Eventually Danger Mouse is able to return to the present and uses the time machine ray to bring Penfold back to the present but instead of sending the dinosaur back he sends back Nelson's Column.
27	5	"Planet of the Cats"	Brian Cosgrove	Story by : Keith Scoble; Screenplay by : Brian Trueman	18 April 1983	8 July 1983	156-305
27	5	"Planet of the Cats"	Brian Cosgrove	Story by : Keith Scoble; Screenplay by : Brian Trueman	19 April 1983	8 July 1983	156-305
27	5	"Planet of the Cats"	Brian Cosgrove	Story by : Keith Scoble; Screenplay by : Brian Trueman	20 April 1983	8 July 1983	156-305
27	5	"Planet of the Cats"	Brian Cosgrove	Story by : Keith Scoble; Screenplay by : Brian Trueman	21 April 1983	8 July 1983	156-305
27	5	"Planet of the Cats"	Brian Cosgrove	Story by : Keith Scoble; Screenplay by : Brian Trueman	22 April 1983	8 July 1983	156-305
While transporting an unstable serum taken from the Germans, Danger Mouse and Penfold are caught up in lightning storm that causes Penfold to spill the test tube's contents and transports them to the future where the world is ruled by cats who are taking orders from Big Leo, who turns out to be a descendant of Baron Greenback. Title reference: Planet of the Apes
28	6	"Four Heads Are Better Than Two"	Brian Cosgrove	Story by : Keith Scoble; Screenplay by : Brian Trueman	25 April 1983	15 July 1983	156-306
28	6	"Four Heads Are Better Than Two"	Brian Cosgrove	Story by : Keith Scoble; Screenplay by : Brian Trueman	26 April 1983	15 July 1983	156-306
28	6	"Four Heads Are Better Than Two"	Brian Cosgrove	Story by : Keith Scoble; Screenplay by : Brian Trueman	27 April 1983	15 July 1983	156-306
28	6	"Four Heads Are Better Than Two"	Brian Cosgrove	Story by : Keith Scoble; Screenplay by : Brian Trueman	28 April 1983	15 July 1983	156-306
28	6	"Four Heads Are Better Than Two"	Brian Cosgrove	Story by : Keith Scoble; Screenplay by : Brian Trueman	29 April 1983	15 July 1983	156-306
In order to improve productivity, Colonel K teams Danger Mouse up with a robot Penfold, and Penfold with a robot Danger Mouse. The robots prove to be a lot of trouble for the real ones, taking instructions too literally or getting stuck running in circles. Danger Mouse and robot Penfold infiltrate a pinball amusement arcade where they try to find Agent 57 and learn of Baron Greenback's latest plans. But Greenback and Stiletto have been using the place as a secret base. They capture and reprogram robot Penfold, and plan to use the slot machine to hypnotize people so they can take over the world.
29	7	"Tower of Terror"	Brian Cosgrove	Story by : Keith Scoble; Screenplay by : Brian Trueman	9 May 1983	22 July 1983	156-307
29	7	"Tower of Terror"	Brian Cosgrove	Story by : Keith Scoble; Screenplay by : Brian Trueman	10 May 1983	22 July 1983	156-307
29	7	"Tower of Terror"	Brian Cosgrove	Story by : Keith Scoble; Screenplay by : Brian Trueman	11 May 1983	22 July 1983	156-307
29	7	"Tower of Terror"	Brian Cosgrove	Story by : Keith Scoble; Screenplay by : Brian Trueman	12 May 1983	22 July 1983	156-307
29	7	"Tower of Terror"	Brian Cosgrove	Story by : Keith Scoble; Screenplay by : Brian Trueman	13 May 1983	22 July 1983	156-307
Danger Mouse and Penfold track Greenback down to a New York City skyscraper run by International Oddbods and a guy who wears a bag over his head. Inside, there are all sorts of bizarre things going on. Baron Greenback controls some of it, but then he and Stiletto must flee when they meet a giant gorilla. Danger Mouse gets caught in the gorilla's shenanigans but then the gorilla's day shift ends and they have to deal with the gorilla's replacement.
30	8	"The Great Bone Idol"	Brian Cosgrove	Story by : Keith Scoble; Screenplay by : Brian Trueman	16 May 1983	29 July 1983	156-308
30	8	"The Great Bone Idol"	Brian Cosgrove	Story by : Keith Scoble; Screenplay by : Brian Trueman	17 May 1983	29 July 1983	156-308
30	8	"The Great Bone Idol"	Brian Cosgrove	Story by : Keith Scoble; Screenplay by : Brian Trueman	18 May 1983	29 July 1983	156-308
30	8	"The Great Bone Idol"	Brian Cosgrove	Story by : Keith Scoble; Screenplay by : Brian Trueman	19 May 1983	29 July 1983	156-308
30	8	"The Great Bone Idol"	Brian Cosgrove	Story by : Keith Scoble; Screenplay by : Brian Trueman	20 May 1983	29 July 1983	156-308
Count Duckula and Greenback team to find the bone idol, an artifact that supposedly has the spirit of Cerberus and that can control all the dogs in the world. Danger Mouse and Penfold follow Duckula to the Himalayas, but have trouble when they are hanging off a cliff. Duckula buys the mystic stick from a guru. Danger Mouse and Penfold steal the stick from Duckula in the Sahara desert and use it to locate the well that has the treasure but guarded by a herd of elephants. Duckula nabs the treasure box with the bone; Danger Mouse tries to take it back but is unsuccessful. Duckula and Greenback activate the bone, summoning all the dogs in the area, but when Duckula accidentally throws the bone back in the box, it locks itself for another thousand years.
31	9	"Public Enemy No. 1"	Brian Cosgrove	Story by : Keith Scoble; Screenplay by : Brian Trueman	23 May 1983	5 August 1983	156-309
31	9	"Public Enemy No. 1"	Brian Cosgrove	Story by : Keith Scoble; Screenplay by : Brian Trueman	24 May 1983	5 August 1983	156-309
31	9	"Public Enemy No. 1"	Brian Cosgrove	Story by : Keith Scoble; Screenplay by : Brian Trueman	25 May 1983	5 August 1983	156-309
31	9	"Public Enemy No. 1"	Brian Cosgrove	Story by : Keith Scoble; Screenplay by : Brian Trueman	26 May 1983	5 August 1983	156-309
31	9	"Public Enemy No. 1"	Brian Cosgrove	Story by : Keith Scoble; Screenplay by : Brian Trueman	27 May 1983	5 August 1983	156-309
Danger Mouse and Penfold are pursuing Baron Greenback when Danger Mouse hits his head and suffers amnesia. Greenback and Stiletto convince Danger Mouse that he is actually a Robin Hood-type vigilante known as the White Shadow and Danger Mouse takes up a life of crime. Penfold tries to catch White Shadow using a pill that allows him to move at extraordinary speed, but it wears out. Since White Shadow has beaten Greenback to doing all the major crimes, Greenback and Stiletto also try to stop White Shadow, but fail. Penfold tries to whack White Shadow in the head with a mallet to break the latter's amnesia.

=== Series 5 (1984) ===
Series 5 episodes are about 10 minutes each, and originally aired on Mondays with no commercial breaks.

No. overall	No. in series	Title	Directed by	Written by	Original release date	US air date	Prod. code
32	1	"The Long Lost Crown Affair"	Brian Cosgrove	Story by : Keith Scoble; Screenplay by : Brian Trueman	20 February 1984	29 June 1984	256-401
Danger Mouse and Penfold have a day off, but they use it to go through the Amazon jungle to look for the long-lost crown of Questzebottle, an Aztec king who is known for inventing the practical joke. As they enter the ruin, Greenback and Nero wait for them, so they can ambush them. Danger Mouse and Penfold must navigate the ruin's traps. The episode title is a reference to The Thomas Crown Affair
33	2	"By George, It's a Dragon!"	Brian Cosgrove	Story by : Keith Scoble; Screenplay by : Brian Trueman	27 February 1984	29 June 1984	256-402
Danger Mouse and Penfold travel to Wales where they must deal with a fire-breathing dragon. It turns out to be a dragon named Jones who is about the same size as them. As per the customs, Jones abducts the damsel in distress (Penfold) and hides in a nice big castle that was offered by Baron Greenback while Danger Mouse strives to be the rescuer knight. When Jones discovers that Greenback was going to take over and enslave Jones, he goes after Greenback instead.
34	3	"Tiptoe Through the Penfolds"	Brian Cosgrove	Story by : Keith Scoble; Screenplay by : Brian Trueman	5 March 1984	6 July 1984	256-403
Inside the Royal Albert Hall, Greenback reveals his new invention: a duplication machine he plans to use to make hundreds of Greenbacks so that no-one would find the real one. He creates a duplicate of Penfold to test it; however, the machine malfunctions and he is unable to turn it off. Danger Mouse investigates but has to deal with the endless numbers of Penfolds. Title reference: "Tiptoe Through the Tulips"
35	4	"Project Moon"	Brian Cosgrove	Story by : Keith Scoble; Screenplay by : Brian Trueman	12 March 1984	6 July 1984	256-404
Danger Mouse and Penfold journey to the Moon to put a radio jamming station Greenback has built there out of operation. While there, Greenback has Stiletto fight them off with some remote controlled mechanical monsters and weapons. Danger Mouse eventually kicks a piece of Moon crystal into the base causing it to self-destruct.
36	5	"The Next Ice Age Begins at Midnight.."	Brian Cosgrove	Story by : Keith Scoble; Screenplay by : Brian Trueman	19 March 1984	13 July 1984	256-405
Greenback uses a weather control machine to cover London in 90 metres deep of snow. Danger Mouse and Penfold head to Willesden Green to try to stop him.
37	6	"The Aliens Are Coming"	Brian Cosgrove	Story by : Keith Scoble; Screenplay by : Brian Trueman	26 March 1984	13 July 1984	256-406
Danger Mouse and Penfold are chosen as ambassadors to meet space aliens. Danger Mouse greets the robotic-looking alien and then tries to demonstrate a hand shake at a pat on the head, but the alien repeats the action too harshly and pats both Danger Mouse and Penfold into the ground. The alien also zaps Penfold into the space above. Danger Mouse gets angry and tries to fight the alien. Eventually it is revealed that the robot was just a small toy to a gigantic alien's child. The real space aliens conclude there is no intelligent life on the planet and leave. The title is a reference to the quote "The British are coming" attributed to Paul Revere.
38	7	"Remote Controlled Chaos"	Brian Cosgrove	Story by : Keith Scoble; Screenplay by : Brian Trueman	2 April 1984	20 July 1984	256-407
Greenback makes a device to control DM's car.
39	8	"The Man from Gadget"	Brian Cosgrove	Story by : Keith Scoble; Screenplay by : Brian Trueman	9 April 1984	27 July 1984	256-408
A salesman of gadgets for secret agents tries to sell Danger Mouse devices which will help him in reaching Greenback's hard to reach hideout. Title reference: The Man from U.N.C.L.E.
40	9	"Tampering with Time Tickles"	Brian Cosgrove	Story by : Keith Scoble; Screenplay by : Brian Trueman	16 April 1984	3 August 1984	256-409
Greenback develops age-altering bombs which turn Danger Mouse into an over eager youth and puts Penfold on the verge of senility.
41	10	"Nero Power"	Brian Cosgrove	Story by : Keith Scoble; Screenplay by : Brian Trueman	30 April 1984	10 August 1984	256-410
Nero gains strange powers (telekenesis), which, he uses to terrorize Danger Mouse and Penfold, after he falls into one of Greenback's inventions.

=== Series 6 (1984–85) ===
Series 6 episodes are 10 minutes each, and originally aired on Thursdays with no commercial breaks (except for the first episode, which aired on a Tuesday). 19 of the episodes (Once Upon A Timeslip and 18 other episodes) show the copyright year as 1984, although for eight episodes ("Viva Danger Mouse", "Hear! Hear!", "Multiplication Fable", "The Spy Who Stayed in With a Cold", "Alping is Snow Easy Matter", "One of Our Stately Homes is Missing", "Ee-Tea!" and "Tut, Tut, it's Not Pharaoh!") the year is shown as 1983.

No. overall	No. in series	Title	Directed by	Written by	Original release date	US air date	Prod. code
42	1	"Once upon a Timeslip..."	Brian Cosgrove	Story by : Keith Scoble; Screenplay by : Brian Trueman	25 December 1984	4 July 1985 (Sneak Peek); 10 July 1985 (Full Episode)	361-601
Due to a fluke in the narrator's microphone, Danger Mouse and Penfold are transported to the year 1215, where they have to act out characters from Robin Hood: Starring Danger Mouse as Robin Hood, Penfold as Little John, Colonel K as the damsel in distress, and Baron Greenback as the Sheriff of Nottingham.
43	2	"Viva Danger Mouse"	Brian Cosgrove	Story by : Keith Scoble; Screenplay by : Brian Trueman	3 January 1985	17 August 1984	256-411
Greenback harvests Mexico's saguaro cacti and uses them to fill the seat cushions of Britain's leaders, as well as Colonel K's and Danger Mouse's seats. Danger Mouse and Penfold travel to the Chihuahuan Desert to try to stop him
44	3	"Play it again Wufgang"	Brian Cosgrove	Story by : Nigel Rutter and Keith Scoble; Screenplay by : Brian Trueman	10 January 1985	17 July 1985	361-602
Danger Mouse and Penfold go after a mad composer who has destroyed all the world's music. They must rely on an emergency audio cassette player to help them with their latest mission, leading them to have to play the appropriate background music on their adventure.
45	4	"Hear Hear"	Brian Cosgrove	Story by : Keith Scoble; Screenplay by : Brian Trueman	17 January 1985	24 August 1984	256-412
Greenback has a device that transmits waves to brainwash people. He brainwashes Colonel K to send Danger Mouse and Penfold on a mission to the South Pole, where they have trouble with a mechanical wild goose that lays explosive eggs. Danger Mouse realizes they've been tricked. On the way to Greenback's lair, Danger Mouse gets brainwashed as well, but Penfold, who has been hard of hearing the entire episode, seems to be immune. Stiletto chases down Penfold, but Penfold falls onto the device and turns it off. It is later revealed that Penfold has been wearing ear plugs.
46	5	"Multiplication Fable"	Brian Cosgrove	Story by : Brian Cosgrove; Screenplay by : Brian Trueman	24 January 1985	31 August 1984	256-413
Danger Mouse and Penfold meet a space alien who has crash-landed in Birmingham and who has a pet tickle-hi-puss that likes to crawl up Penfold's trouser legs. However, the pet gets loose and whenever there is some physical impact, it multiplies. The episode is a parody of the Star Trek episode, "Trouble with Tribbles"
47	6	"The Spy Who Stayed In with a Cold"	Brian Cosgrove	Story by : Keith Scoble; Screenplay by : Brian Trueman	31 January 1985	8 April 1985	344-501
While Penfold is home with a cold, Danger Mouse gets a mission to deal with the Mongol hordes that have recently acquired motorbikes. In Northern Finland, he meets up with Agent 57, who also has a cold and changes form whenever he sneezes, thanks to messing around with a molecular fragmenter device. Together, they manage to fool Baron Greenback and Stiletto, and then stop the Mongols. Title reference: The Spy Who Came in from the Cold
48	7	"It's All White, White Wonder"	Brian Cosgrove	Story by : Keith Scoble; Screenplay by : Brian Trueman	7 February 1985	24 July 1985	361-603
Danger Mouse and Penfold find Baron Greenback's hideout, but the Baron has escaped, and Stiletto is left behind in disguise. However, Stiletto gets hit by something that turns him completely white, and something almost pulls Penfold down the sink drain. It turns out there is an enzyme monster from the Wonder White Soap Company that is loose in the London drains and turning everything all white.
49	8	"The Hickory Dickory Dock Dilemma"	Brian Cosgrove	Story by : Angus Allan; Screenplay by : Brian Trueman	14 February 1985	31 July 1985	361-604
Danger Mouse and Penfold head to the Tower of London to look for thieves that are after the crown jewels. They find a grandfather clock but when they enter it, they find they are actually in a time machine. They travel to the time of Stonehenge and then to an age where there are sea pirates. They also travel to the future where Danger Mouse encounters a security robot and a kingdom ruled by a large descendant of Penfold.
50	9	"What a 3 Point Turn-up for the Book"	Brian Cosgrove	Story by : Keith Scoble; Screenplay by : Brian Trueman	21 February 1985	7 August 1985	361-605
Danger Mouse finds out he needs to hurry to attend an award ceremony, but the Mark III somehow cops an attitude and refuses to be controlled. Danger Mouse and Penfold spent most of the episode trying to chase the Mark III down.
51	10	"Quark! Quark!"	Brian Cosgrove	Story by : Keith Scoble; Screenplay by : Brian Trueman	28 February 1985	14 August 1985	361-606
Space alien J. J. Quark announces that he is going to claim the Earth as his. Danger Mouse and Penfold disguise themselves in a horse costume and meet J. J. with intentions to settle with a tour of the Earth and sharing tea. J. J. does not want to do so and plans to blast Danger Mouse but J. J.'s robot assistant Grovell, keeps groveling at any mention of his name and gets in the way of the blasts, resulting in falling to pieces and having to get repaired. Penfold ultimately gets out of the costume but when J. J. sees Penfold, he laughs uncontrollably and retreats.
52	11	"Alping is Snow Easy Matter"	Brian Cosgrove	Story by : Angus Allan; Screenplay by : Brian Trueman	7 March 1985	9 April 1985	344-502
Danger Mouse and Penfold must stop Baron Greenback from using a heat ray to melt the polar ice caps to cause a flood so he can make a fortune selling inflatable boats and rubber ducks. They head to the Alps but find that Greenback's lair is blocked by a force field. They sneak in by tunneling in the snow and find themselves in a tunnel where a train knocks them to the secret lair. Danger Mouse tricks Stiletto and Penfold binds him. Danger Mouse then uses a titanium mirror to deflect Greenback's ray gun blast to destroy the lair.
53	12	"Aaagghg!! Spiders!"	Brian Cosgrove	Story by : Angus Allan; Screenplay by : Brian Trueman	14 March 1985	21 August 1985	361-607
Penfold and Danger Mouse are shocked to find a giant spider in their bathroom. All of London has been covered in spider webbing, so Colonel K. tasks Danger Mouse and Penfold to put a stop to it. They discover it is the work of Stiletto, who while Greenback is on vacation in Paris, has been flying around in a vehicle and shooting a ray that enlarges all spiders.
54	13	"One of our Stately Homes Is Missing"	Brian Cosgrove	Story by : Keith Scoble; Screenplay by : Brian Trueman	21 March 1985	10 April 1985	344-503
An old English manor was moved away and held for ransom. Danger Mouse and Penfold meet with members of the Building Location and Emergency Expedition Platoon (B.L.E.E.P.) to recover it. The title is a reference to the film: One of Our Aircraft is Missing
55	14	"Afternoon Off with the Fangboner!"	Brian Cosgrove	Story by : Keith Scoble; Screenplay by : Brian Trueman	28 March 1985	28 August 1985	361-608
Danger Mouse and Penfold are golfing when they are called by Colonel K to meet with space alien J. J. Quark, who wants to make a treaty with them in North Africa. But J. J. surprises them by releasing a voracious beast called the Fangboner which chases them in the Mark III all over the place. After the Mark III crashes, the Fangboner attacks and eats Penfold's humbugs. Danger Mouse lures the Fangboner back into J. J.'s spaceship.
56	15	"Beware of Mexicans Delivering Milk"	Brian Cosgrove	Story by : Angus Allan; Screenplay by : Brian Trueman	4 April 1985	16 October 1985	361-615
When Danger Mouse drinks milk that has been drugged with a sedative, he feels very weak and groggy, and thus Penfold must lead the charge to fight El Loco, a Mexican bandit, who intends to rob the Bank of England.
57	16	"CATastrophe"	Brian Cosgrove	Story by : Angus Allan; Screenplay by : Brian Trueman	11 April 1985	4 September 1985	361-609
Color K. is kidnapped by a mechanical cat named P.A.W.S. Danger Mouse and Penfold head to Castle Nasty to try to rescue him, but P.A.W.S. is outwitting them because he has been programmed to read Danger Mouse's brain waves. It turns out Greenback is behind the abduction.
58	17	"The Good the Bad and the Motionless"	Brian Cosgrove	Story by : Keith Scoble; Screenplay by : Brian Trueman	18 April 1985	30 October 1985	361-610
Danger Mouse investigates strange goings-on at Stonehenge only to battle his devilish alter-ego. Title reference: The Good, the Bad and the Ugly
59	18	"Statues"	Brian Cosgrove	Story by : Angus Allan; Screenplay by : Brian Trueman	25 April 1985	18 September 1985	361-611
Greenback devises a ray that animates London's statues and causes them to wreak havoc. Danger Mouse coaxes Greenback into taking a statue of him, but when Greenback animates it, he is shocked to find that underneath it is a statue of Monsieur Smaquing Lipps, a chef who popularized frog legs.
60	19	"The Clock Strikes Back"	Brian Cosgrove	Story by : Keith Scoble; Screenplay by : Brian Trueman	2 May 1985	25 September 1985	361-612
The time-travelling grandfather clock makes its return as it appears at Windsor Castle. A wizard named Master Hooter de la Beck Longsnout, or Snozzle for short, tells Danger Mouse and Penfold that he is the rival of Merlin from King Arthur's times, and that he plans to take over the world. He puts weighted boots on Danger Mouse and turns Penfold into a chicken, but when he tries to zap them again the powers bounce off a mirror and turn them back to normal. Danger Mouse and Penfold get into a suit of armor which blocks Snozzle's powers. Snozzle escapes into the clock. Title reference: The Empire Strikes Back
61	20	"Ee-Tea!"	Brian Cosgrove	Story by : Angus Allan; Screenplay by : Brian Trueman	9 May 1985	11 April 1985	344-504
Greenback has London at a standstill after he steals all of the world's tea. Danger Mouse and Penfold head to the Bombay docks which has the last of the tea stocks, board a crate and find themselves launched into outer space into a Greenback's satellite shaped like a teapot. They bring the teapot back to Earth where it lands in the ocean. Title Reference: E.T. The Extra-Terrestrial.
62	21	"Bandits Beans and Ballyhoo!"	Brian Cosgrove	Story by : Keith Scoble; Screenplay by : Brian Trueman	23 May 1985	2 October 1985	361-613
Unpacking from a holiday in Mexico, Penfold discovers El Loco hiding in his suitcase. El Loco gets loose and goes on a crime spree in London.
63	22	"Have You Fled from any Good Books Lately?"	Brian Cosgrove	Story by : Angus Allan; Screenplay by : Brian Trueman	30 May 1985	9 October 1985	361-614
Penfold gets a pop-up book of monsters from a mysterious book sales club, but it turns out to be from J.J. Quark who turns the monsters in the book alive. Danger Mouse eventually turns the tide by drawing in a monster of his own.
64	23	"Tut, Tut, It's not Pharaoh"	Brian Cosgrove	Story by : Angus Allan; Screenplay by : Brian Trueman	6 June 1985	12 April 1985	344-505
Greenback sets out to steal an ancient Egyptian amulet by following Danger Mouse and Penfold as they head to the Great Pyramid of Giza. Danger Mouse and Penfold encounter a large mummy who acts as a parking attendant. Inside the pyramid, they fall through some traps. They eventually find the amulet, but are about to be captured by Greenback, but the amulet's powers wrap Greenback and Stiletto in mummy bandages.
65	24	"Lost, Found and Spellbound"	Brian Cosgrove	Story by : Keith Scoble; Screenplay by : Brian Trueman	13 June 1985	11 September 1985	361-616
Danger Mouse and Penfold had to the China seas to look for Professor Squakencluck who, despite having invented an object that can never be lost, ends up dropping the item in a remote island and getting lost himself. Danger Mouse must deal with a crafty witch doctor, while Penfold stumbles into other jungle perils.
66	25	"Penfold BF"	Brian Cosgrove	Story by : Brian Cosgrove; Screenplay by : Brian Trueman	20 June 1985	23 October 1985	361-617
Penfold swallows Professor Squakencluck's new pill and is turned into a superhero called the Blue Flash. But he causes Danger Mouse more problems than usual as they try to catch a lost messenger pigeon.
67	26	"Mechanised Mayhem"	Brian Cosgrove	Story by : Angus Allan; Screenplay by : Brian Trueman	27 June 1985	6 November 1985	361-618
Under orders from a supercomputer, all the world's machines mutiny and refuse to do their jobs.
68	27	"Journey to the Earth's Cor!"	Brian Cosgrove	Story by : Brian Cosgrove; Screenplay by : Brian Trueman	26 December 1985	28 March 1986	361-619
Penfold and Danger Mouse journey to the center of the Earth to stop a loud noise that originates there. Title reference: Journey to the Center of the Earth

=== Series 7 (1986) ===
Series 7 episodes are 25 minutes each, and originally aired on Thursdays. The U.S. advertised these as specials that aired monthly, but the VHS and DVD releases consider them to be Series 7.

No. overall	No. in series	Title	Directed by	Written by	Original release date	US air date	Prod. code
69	1	"DM on the Orient Express"	Chris Randall	Story by : Chris Randall; Screenplay by : Brian Trueman	13 November 1986	19 January 1987	441-701
While vacationing in the canals of Venice, Danger Mouse and Penfold bump into a highway undergoing construction, being built by Baron Greenback, who holds a document that allows him to construct whatever he wants. Danger Mouse takes the document and hands it to Penfold to hide it, but Penfold loses it in the canal where it is eaten by a fish. Colonel K has Danger Mouse and Penfold board the Orient Express with the supposed document, but Greenback has hired assassins to foil their plans. Title reference: Murder on the Orient Express
70	2	"The Ultra Secret Secret"	Chris Randall	Story by : Jean Flynn; Screenplay by : Angus Allan	20 November 1986	16 February 1987	441-702
Greenback offers to team up with Danger Mouse in order to thwart an alien invasion. Professor Sqawkencluck outfits the Space Hopper with a secret weapon. Danger Mouse and Penfold head to Greenback's space station but they get lost in the station's vastness. Greenback has Stiletto steal the secret weapon, as he is the mastermind behind the fake invasion fleet.
71	3	"Duckula Meets Frankenstoat"	Chris Randall	Story by : Keith Scoble and Angus Allan; Screenplay by : Brian Trueman	27 November 1986	14 March 1987	441-703
Danger Mouse and Penfold are on holiday in the Bernese Alps when they get a call to deal with Count Duckula, who has teamed up with Dr. Frankenstoat to take over the world with a vampire-making machine.
72	4	"Where There's a Well There's a Way"	Chris Randall	Story by : Keith Scoble and Angus Allan; Screenplay by : Brian Trueman	4 December 1986	17 April 1987	441-704
Danger Mouse and Penfold are sent to find Merlin's magic inkwell which will grant the finder a wish. They go on a treasure hunt by following a series of clues. However, the mysterious and scary-looking Copper-Conk Cassidy is on their tail, after eavesdropping the information given from Colonel K, with desires of using the well to rule the world.
73	5	"All Fall Down"	Chris Randall	Story by : Keith Scoble and Angus Allan; Screenplay by : Angus Allan	11 December 1986	10 May 1987	441-705
Danger Mouse must recover plans to a top secret device capable of shattering the world. The device's blueprint is revealed to be stolen by the snake villain, Mac the Fork, who teams up with his friend, the owl chemist Dudley Poyson, who is capable of inventing the device.
74	6	"Tide of the Turn"	Chris Randall	Story by : Chris Randall; Screenplay by : Brian Trueman	18 December 1986	20 June 1987	441-706
London appears to be flooded in water, and its citizens have to crowd up in the top parts of its buildings. Danger Mouse and Penfold discover that the nearby sea has been emptied. Prof. Squawkencluck explains that the tidal patterns from the moon's gravitational pull are messed up. Danger Mouse and Penfold travel to the moon and find that the crater of Copernicus has been filled with a metal scrapyard of space debris. They negotiate with a space alien to buy the debris and settle with giving up Penfold's eyebrows.

=== Series 8 (1987) ===
Series 8 episodes were 10 minutes each, and originally aired on Fridays with no commercial breaks. This series was the shortest-lived with just two episodes. Some sources such as the book 'The Guinness Book of Classic British TV' by Paul Cornell et al. list these episodes as theoretically belonging to the fifth or sixth series. It states that some episodes were often held back and not broadcast until years later as part of a repeats series. This would seem to be supported by the copyright information in the end credits, as both are dated 1983 (as per series 5 episodes and some Series 6 episodes).

No. overall	No. in series	Title	Directed by	Written by	Original release date	US air date	Prod. code
75	1	"Gremlin Alert"	Brian Cosgrove	Story by : Keith Scoble; Screenplay by : Brian Trueman	20 February 1987	4 July 1987	344-506
Danger Mouse and Penfold head to outer space where they find a station has been beaming darkness onto the Earth. On the station they encounter a fearsome gremlin which operates on reverse logic; everything that Danger Mouse and Penfold say they will do becomes the opposite. Danger Mouse and Penfold try to say the opposite, and eventually Danger Mouse is able to outwit the gremlin with self-contradicting logic.
76	2	"Cor! What a Picture!"	Brian Cosgrove	Story by : Angus Allan; Screenplay by : Brian Trueman	27 February 1987	4 July 1987	344-507
Penfold takes a long time to have his passport photos taken at a booth, but he gets a sheet that says "You have broken the lens." Greenback uses Penfold's photos and a mind-control device to manipulate Penfold into becoming an assassin who attacks Danger Mouse as if he were Cato Fong from The Pink Panther. Danger Mouse finds Greenback's hideout and foils his plan using a photo of Greenback's mother to turn Greenback into a nag on himself.

=== Series 9 (1991) ===
Series 9 episodes were 22 minutes each and originally aired on Thursdays. The show's appearance changed noticeably with this series, now brighter and with altered artwork – most notably to Danger Mouse himself. Jimmy Hibbert is added to the voice cast. Like Series 7, the U.S. aired these as specials monthly, but the VHS and DVD releases consider them Series 9.

No. overall	No. in series	Title	Directed by	Written by	Original release date	Rehydrated air date	Prod. code
77	1	"I Spy with My Little Eye..."	Keith Scoble	Story by : Keith Scoble; Screenplay by : Brian Trueman	3 January 1991	2 September 1991	497-901
Danger Mouse and Penfold head to the North Pole on news that Baron Greenback and Stiletto have been selling over a thousand heat lamps to the Eskimos and causing the polar ice caps to melt.
78	2	"Bigfoot Falls"	Keith Scoble	Story by : Keith Scoble; Screenplay by : Jimmy Hibbert	10 January 1991	7 October 1991	497-902
Colonel K thinks Danger Mouse has camouflaged himself and starts rambling. After Danger Mouse arrives to straighten up things, Danger Mouse and Penfold head to Canada to track down a Bigfoot that has been crushing the local villages and landscape. When they find it, they discover he's actually friendly, but suffers from extreme bouts of sore feet and forgets that he has rampaged. After rescuing a guy from the local Mohawk ribe, Danger Mouse and Penfold discover that he is a member of the RCMP – Royal Canadian Mounted Podiatrists.
79	3	"The Statue of Liberty Caper"	Keith Scoble	Story by : Brian Cosgrove; Screenplay by : Brian Trueman	17 January 1991	5 November 1991	497-903
Penfold has been littering their home with the crumbs of his aunt's cookies. Danger Mouse and Penfold go to the United States to stop Greenback who has stolen a bunch of landmarks from New York City including the Statue of Liberty. After meeting up with the president, they head to Liberty Island and discover there is sand from the Nevada desert. They head to the desert and discover a big X on the ground where Greenback then drops the statue on top of them. Danger Mouse and Greenback try to outdo each other in guessing what the other is guessing, and Penfold reunites with his aunt.
80	4	"Penfold Transformed"	Keith Scoble	Story by : Chris Randall; Screenplay by : Brian Trueman	24 January 1991	22 November 1991	497-904
Dr Crumhorn holds Penfold captive and has created a robot duplicate of him (which is far more efficient than the original). At the push of a button, it transforms into a giant machine intent on destroying Danger Mouse and his pillar box. Meanwhile, envious of Crumhorn's own plan, Greenback has Stiletto disguised as Penfold in costume in his attempt to hack into Danger Mouse's pillar box.
81	5	"A Dune with a View"	Keith Scoble	Story by : Keith Scoble; Screenplay by : Jimmy Hibbert	31 January 1991	19 January 1992	497-905
The Mark III runs out of fuel, leaving DM and Penfold stranded in the Sahara Desert. Title reference: A Room with a View
82	6	"Don Coyote and Sancho Penfold"	Keith Scoble	Story by : Chris Randall; Screenplay by : Brian Trueman	7 February 1991	16 February 1992	497-906
While on holiday in Spain, Penfold is kidnapped by a mad Coyote who thinks he is Don Quixote. They go tilting at a windmill that happens to contain Baron Greenback's latest device for world domination.

=== Series 10 (1992) ===
Series 10 episodes were 22 minutes each, and originally aired on Thursdays with no commercial breaks. The book The Guinness Book of Classic British TV by Paul Cornell et al. lists these episodes as a continuation of the ninth series. This was the final series of the show's original run.

No. overall	No. in series	Title	Directed by	Written by	Original release date	Rehydrated air date	Prod. code
83	1	"Crumhorn Strikes Back!"	Keith Scoble	Brian Trueman	6 February 1992	15 March 1992	497-907
Dr Crumhorn returns and uses his transformation pills to turn himself into a little girl in an attempt to persuade Danger Mouse and Penfold to help her out and eventually lead them to break into Fort Knox. Title reference: The Empire Strikes Back
84	2	"Ants, Trees and... Whoops-A-Daisy"	Keith Scoble	Brian Trueman	13 February 1992	9 April 1992	497-908
Danger Mouse and Penfold go to the Amazon jungle where a tribe have been sacrificing people to The Great Ant God from Ataxia. Penfold is captured by the tribe and his "magic caterpillars" (eyebrows) are to be sacrificed. Danger Mouse is attacked by a carnivorous plant and later falls down a series of pits. Things look grim, but then, Penfold's aunt, who he was supposed to pick up from the airport, arrives. The tribe thinks she is the god when she says she is Penfold's "great ant" who has come from "a taxi".
85	3	"There's a Penfold in my Suit"	Keith Scoble	Story by : Brian Cosgrove; Screenplay by : Jimmy Hibbert	20 February 1992	9 May 1992	497-909
Penfold puts on Danger Mouse's suit and cannot get out, which confuses Colonel K into thinking he is Danger Mouse. Later, DM and Penfold go to Bratislavakia to find out why all the countries of Central Europe have swapped places. As they pass under a stone arch, they discover they have swapped bodies, and the king and princess there have swapped bodies as well. Greenback and Stiletto also join in.
86	4	"Rhyme and Punishment"	Keith Scoble	Story by : Keith Scoble; Screenplay by : Jimmy Hibbert and Trevor Hyatt	27 February 1992	20 June 1992	497-910
Penfold types up his memoirs. Colonel K tells them that things around the city are suddenly vanishing with a loud "kazonk". Then Danger Mouse and Penfold are kazonked into a void-like dimension by Dr. Crumhorn. Title reference: Crime and Punishment
87	5	"Pillow Fright!"	Keith Scoble	Story by : Keith Scoble and Jonathan Trueman; Screenplay by : Jimmy Hibbert	5 March 1992	4 July 1992	497-911
Greenback attempts to take over England with his latest invention...an army of remote control, allergy causing pillows.
88	6	"Heavy Duty"	Keith Scoble	Story by : Keith Scoble and Jonathan Trueman; Screenplay by : Brian Trueman	12 March 1992	1 August 1992	497-912
Crumhorn invents a chemical that allows him to create land sharks to terrorize London. Things get even more complicated when Penfold eats some of the formula.
89	7	"The Intergalactic 147"	Keith Scoble	Story by : Keith Scoble; Screenplay by : Jimmy Hibbert	19 March 1992	7 September 1992	497-913
A giant spaceship is spotted heading for Earth. It's part of the "Intergalactic 147" snooker game and it wants to pot the Earth into a black hole. This is the series finale.

== Notes ==
- The first 4 series were all dated 1980.
- Series 5 was dated 1983.
- For the syndicated market, notably for Nickelodeon, the first 5 series were all dated 1984.
- Series 7 was dated 1985.
- Series 9 and Series 10 were dated 1990.
- At the end of the 7th, 9th & 10th series, the copyright under the DM logo has changed to COSGROVE HALL PRODUCTIONS instead of the usual 'A Cosgrove Hall Production' logo with a copyright under that caption.
