= Skeletons (2010 film) =

2010 British horror drama

- Directed by: Nick Whitfield
- Written by: Nick Whitfield
- Starring: Ed Gaughan, Andrew Buckley, Jason Isaacs
- Release date: 2010
- Country: United Kingdom
- Language: English

Skeletons is a 2010 British pastoral science fiction film directed by Nick Whitfield, starring Ed Gaughan, Andrew Buckley, and Jason Isaacs. It was nominated for 'Outstanding Debut by a British Director' at the 64th British Academy Film Awards. Skeletons was the winner of the "Best new British feature film" award at the 2010 Edinburgh International Film Festival. The plot surrounds two psychic exorcists who travel Britain providing a service to their customers of revealing couples' hidden secrets.

== Plot ==
Two "suited, slightly shabby (or even seedy in one case), privately-contracted investigators...walk through the British countryside to visit couples and others who want to exhume and clear out the secrets and [(metaphorical)] skeletons in one another’s closets before[,] for example[,] getting married."

The psychic investigators do this by accessing "portals to the couples’ histories, that are accessed through the cupboards in their houses and which allow the investigators to view and experience the hidden parts of their customers lives.”

== Cast ==
- Ed Gaughan as Davis
- Andrew Buckley as Bennett
- Jason Isaacs as The Colonel
- Paprika Steen as Jane
- Tuppence Middleton as Rebecca
- Josef Whitfield as Jo-Jo
- Keith Lancaster as The Father
- Holly-Mai Leighton as Young Rebecca

== Filming locations ==
Much of the film was shot around Matlock Bath. Ed Gaughan's character lives in a boat in a field beside a power station. The power station is Ratcliffe-on-Soar Power Station and boats from the River Soar had become stranded in a flood.

== Soundtrack ==
The track 'Polegnala e Pschenitza', from Le Mystere des Voix Bulgares features prominently in the soundtrack.
