= Greenback =

Greenback(s) may refer to:

== Currency ==
- Greenback (1860s money), a fiat currency issued during the American Civil War
- United States Note, paper money issued from 1862 to 1971
- Greenback, a nickname used for the United States dollar in the financial press in other countries

== Fish ==
- Greenback cutthroat trout (Oncorhynchus clarki stomias), the easternmost subspecies of cutthroat trout in the US
- Greenback flounder (Rhombosolea tapirina), a species of flounder found in Australasian waters
- Greenback horse mackerel (Trachurus declivis), a species of jack found in Australasian waters
- Greenback stingaree (Urolophus viridis), a stingray found in SE Australian waters

== Music ==
- "Greenbacks", a 1955 song by Ray Charles
- "Greenbacks" (Once Upon a Time), an episode of the seventh season of Once Upon a Time

== Other uses ==
- Baron Silas Greenback, a fictional villainous toad in Danger Mouse (TV series)
- Greenback, Tennessee, a city in the United States
- Greenback Party, an American political party active between 1874 and 1884 which advocated non-gold-backed government currency
