= The Earth is Enough =

1989 book by Harry Middleton

- First edition cover
- Author: Harry Middleton
- Publisher: Simon & Schuster
- Publication date: July 1, 1989
- ISBN: 978-0-671-67459-5

The Earth is Enough: Growing Up in a World of Trout and Old Men is a book by American nature writer Harry Middleton, published in March 1989 by the Pruett Publishing Company. The book chronicles Middleton's young life in the Ozark mountains.
