= Ed Gaughan =

British actor

- Occupation: Actor
- Years active: 2004-present

Ed Gaughan is an English actor, director, comedian, voice actor and jazz musician. He is best known for his starring role in the BAFTA-nominated 2010 film Skeletons and for voicing Baron von Greenback in Danger Mouse and Q Pootle 5 in Q Pootle 5.

== Career ==
He grew up in Barnstaple and went to Pilton Community College.

2000-2010 he formed a standup comedy double-act with Andrew Buckley.

He was nominated for The Peter Sellers Award For Comedy in 2011 for his role in the film Skeletons.

Gaughan has been a voice over artist since 2007. His most famous roles include Q Pootle 5 on CBeebies and Baron von Greenback in Danger Mouse on CBBC.

Acting roles in movies have included Hummingbird, Fantastic Beasts: The Crimes of Grindelwald. Ed Gaughan has also starred in several episodes of the TV show Brassic.

He played guitar for the album Let's Do It - Jazz Classics With a Twist with Danusia Samal.
