= HIT Entertainment =

British entertainment company

HIT Entertainment Limited
- Formerly: Henson International Television (1982–1989); Gainbase PLC (1989); HIT Communications PLC (1989–1992); HIT Entertainment PLC (1992–2005)
- Type: Label of Mattel
- Traded as: LSE: HTE
- Industry: Television production
- Genre: Entertainment; Children's programming
- Predecessors: Gullane Entertainment; Lyrick Studios
- Founded: 1982; 44 years ago
- Founders: Jim Henson; Peter Orton; Sophie Turner Laing
- Defunct: 31 March 2016; 10 years ago (Note: The HiT Entertainment brand is still used by Mattel in promo material, merchandise, and on productions based on HIT's intellectual properties.)
- Fate: Absorbed into Mattel Creations
- Successor: Mattel Television
- Headquarters: London, England
- Number of locations: 3 (Note: Three offices in the United States: New York City (distribution), Los Angeles, California (HIT Movies), and Allen, Texas (the studio handling Barney & Friends))
- Area served: Worldwide
- Products: Children's television series; Children's films
- Services: Distribution; Licensing
- Parent: Jim Henson Productions (1982–1989); Apax Partners (2005–2012); Mattel (2012–2016)
- Divisions: HIT Consumer Products; HIT Toy Company; HIT Movies
- Subsidiaries: HIT Entertainment USA Inc.; HIT Entertainment Canada Inc.
- Website: hitentertainment.com (redirects to Mattel)

HIT Entertainment Limited (stylised as HiT) was a British entertainment company founded in 1982 as Henson International Television, the international distribution arm of The Jim Henson Company, by Jim Henson, Peter Orton, and Sophie Turner Laing. Orton alone took over the company in 1989 after learning Henson intended to sell the company to The Walt Disney Company. HIT owned and distributed children's television series such as Thomas & Friends, Fireman Sam, Bob the Builder, Pingu, Barney & Friends and Angelina Ballerina.

HIT Entertainment was one of several partner companies alongside Comcast, PBS, and Sesame Workshop that founded PBS Kids Sprout; many of HIT's shows aired on the channel as a result.

On 1 February 2012, HIT Entertainment was acquired by Mattel, as Mattel was initially only interested in the Thomas & Friends brand in its acquisition, according to Deadline Hollywood. Mattel absorbed the company on 31 March 2016 into its then newly created division, Mattel Creations.

HIT had a brand initiative called The Little Big Club, to feature some of the company's characters in live events held at shopping malls as well as the kids zone areas (also having live shows) at all-inclusive Hard Rock Hotels in Mexico and the Dominican Republic.

== History ==
=== 1982–1990: Early history as Henson Associates subsidiary ===
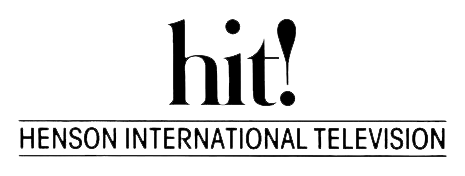
Founded in 1982, this logo was first used in The Muppet Show in 1983. The name would be stylized as "hit!".

Peter Orton had met Jim Henson when he was at the Children's Television Workshop handling distribution of Sesame Street. As a result, he became close friends with Henson and went to work with him in 1981. Together they set up Henson International Television, which was the international distribution arm of Jim Henson Productions the following year, with Orton becoming the company's CEO.

=== 1989–1999: Becoming independent ===
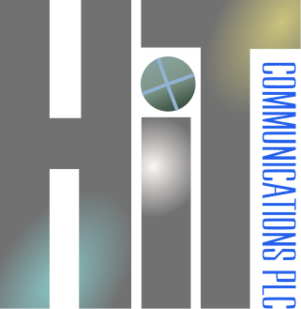
In 1989, Jim Henson Productions spun off Henson International Television and changed its name to HIT Communications PLC.

Beginning in the late-1980s, Jim Henson Productions began negotiations with The Walt Disney Company regarding a possible purchase of a merger. Upon hearing these talks, Orton and other employees at HIT! convinced Henson to allow them to spin off the distribution arm as an independent distribution company. Following Henson's approval, in October 1989, Orton led management buyout of Henson International Television and re-incorporated the subsidiary as a standalone company named HIT Communications PLC.

Under its new name, HIT no longer held distribution rights to Henson's catalogue, and instead began acquiring other programs for international distribution, including Woodland Animations' Postman Pat and Bagdasarian Productions' Alvin and the Chipmunks, and later international acquisitions like Lyrick Studios' Barney & Friends.

Beginning in 1991, HIT would begin to engage in co-producing shows which they would distribute internationally, with the first two as part of this new strategy being Where's Wally? and Captain Zed and the Zee Zone. The company then began to finance and distribute animated feature films based on The Wind in the Willows and Peter Rabbit books. Helping to fund the company was an investment by British satellite and cable television operator Flextech took a 23% share in HIT for about £600,000.

The HIT Wildlife division was created to produce nature and wildlife programming which provided the company with 35% of its revenue by the mid-1990s.

With the success of Barney, HIT began to develop its own programming. In 1996, HIT was listed on the AIM to raise funding; it used the funding to launch HIT Video, which would produce direct-to-video programming in the United Kingdom.

A new character came to the company's attention in 1996, when advertising executive and would-be cartoonist Keith Chapman pitched his idea to HIT Entertainment. Chapman's character was a general contractor named Bob the Builder. While a number of other producers had turned down the idea, HIT recognized its potential and bought the rights to developing the Bob the Builder character into a television series. The deal saw Chapman retain a share of the copyright and also a contractual clause which sees his name appear on all media & merchandise related to the character.

With another offering in 1997, HIT increased its capitalization and move to the primary London Stock Exchange, whose funding HIT would use to develop some of its first original series including Brambly Hedge, Percy the Park Keeper, and Kipper, which became its first hit on ITV.

In 1998, HIT formed its own animation production company, HOT Animation, and its Consumers Product Division. The BBC agreed to broadcast Bob the Builder. HIT signed a series of American broadcasting deals starting with Nickelodeon for Kipper expanding to Starz/Encore for the Brambly Hedge and Percy the Park Keeper television series; HBO Family for the Anthony Ant cartoon series, and Animal Planet for the Wylands Ocean World wildlife program. Kipper won the 1998 BAFTA Award for Best Children's Animation. At the end of the year, HIT offered another group of shares.

In 1999, HIT had 10 first-run television series in the United States and started an American subsidiary. In April, Bob the Builder successfully debuted on the BBC; in July the company made another public offering of stock. An American deal for Bob the Builder was signed in December with Nickelodeon to start airing in January 2001. Pleasant Company, a subsidiary of Mattel signed a five-year US licensing agreement to handle toys as well as publishing for the Angelina Ballerina books and television series.

=== 2000–2004: Bob the Builder to final independent years ===
HIT, which had long been suggesting that it intended to expand its character stable through acquisitions, nearly found a partner in early 2000 when the company held talks with Britt Allcroft, the British company which held the licenses to such popular characters as Thomas & Friends, Captain Pugwash, and Sooty. The two sides were unable to agree on a price, however, and the merger fell through. Bob the Builder continued its success with the number one record in December that year.

In December 2000, HIT entered into a North American home video partnership with Lyrick Studios, home and owner of Barney & Friends, for distribution of Bob the Builder and Kipper releases. This early partnership was an early plan for that led to HIT purchasing Lyrick for $275 million, which would in turn give HIT a marketing and distribution network that it used to introduce its properties to U.S. audiences. Vice versa, the deal would help expand Barney's international presence, which was what Lyrick needed at the time. The chief executive of HIT, Rob Lawes, was the driving force of the acquisition. The Lyrick acquisition encouraged HIT Entertainment to pursue new acquisitions.

In May 2001, the first Bob the Builder VHS volumes were released in the United States by HIT/Lyrick, while the company signed a deal with Sears to have Bob Shops in their retail stores. The Jim Henson Company's owner EM.TV was in financial trouble over its purchase of 50% share in Formula One racing rights, and HIT joined a number of companies willing to purchase TJHC. In October 2001, HIT's bid for Pingu BV was accepted.

In April 2002, HIT Entertainment sold its wildlife division to the newly formed Parthenon Entertainment, which was owned by the former managing director of HIT Wildlife, Carlos "Carl" Hall, with its 30 hours of programming in production and its 300-hour library was transferred in the management buyout agreement.

The board of Gullane Entertainment agreed to have the company be purchased by HIT for £139 million. The television shows owned by Gullane included Thomas & Friends, Magic Adventures of Mumfie, and Fireman Sam, which a stake of was purchased from S4C months before. On 22 August 2002, HIT Entertainment officially opened its Canadian office in Toronto.

In March 2003, CCI Entertainment, the Canadian affiliate of Gullane who owned a minority stake in CCI's shares prior to the HIT purchase, announced they had ended their partnership with HIT and re-acquired their shares in the company, including all of their programming libraries, which made out half of Gullane's catalogue. The shows CCI reacquired were put into the company's CCI Releasing subsidiary. HIT's next television series Rubbadubbers aired in September of the same year.

On 1 April 2004, HIT and The Jim Henson Company agreed to a five-year global distribution and production deal which included distribution of 440 hours of TJHC's remaining library, including Fraggle Rock, Emmet Otter's Jug-Band Christmas, The Hoobs, and Jim Henson's Mother Goose Stories. In addition, the agreement also included the production of new properties, including Frances, in which both companies co-produced and co-owned the copyright to the series. While firing its chief executive Rob Lawes in October 2004, the company announced its launching of a 24-hour preschool channel known as PBS Kids Sprout with PBS, Comcast, and Sesame Workshop.

=== 2005–2011: Apax Partners ownership ===
Following a bidding war between Classic Media and Lions Gate Entertainment, On 22 March 2005, Apax Partners announced that they had purchased HIT for £489.4 million, taking it private, with former BBC director general Greg Dyke becoming chairman. On 26 August 2005, HIT announced an agreement with Comcast, PBS, and Sesame Workshop to launch the world's first 24-hour preschool television channel entitled PBS Kids Sprout, with HIT supplying programming for the channel as a result at the time.

In February 2006, HIT closed its DVD sales and distribution arm in the U.S. and signed a deal with 20th Century Fox Home Entertainment to release their content in the North American market. HIT continued to sell and distribute its own DVD output in the UK.

On 8 March 2007, HIT announced they had purchased the Rainbow Magic book franchise with intentions to create a media and consumer lineup for the property. On 22 March, HIT acquired S4C's 50% stake in Fireman Sam, taking full ownership in the franchise. S4C would remain an executive producer for upcoming seasons and retain all Welsh-language rights to the property. On 18 June 2007, HIT announced a strategic alliance with Chapman Entertainment to represent Fifi and the Flowertots and Roary the Racing Car in North America and Japan. In September, HIT and Chellomedia formed a joint venture to run the JimJam children's channel. Also that same month, HIT entered into an agreement with Aardman Animations to represent licensing and home entertainment distribution for Wallace & Gromit, Shaun the Sheep and Aardman Classics in the US and Canada, which was later extended in June 2008 to include Timmy Time as well as worldwide representation for Aardman's themed attraction business. HIT Entertainment opened its own toy company, the HIT Toy Company. In October, after failing to supply ITV a new series of Sooty the previous year, HIT announced they had put the Sooty Limited/Bridgefilms venture up for sale, consisting of both Sooty and Magic Adventures of Mumfie, an earlier Britt Allcroft creation. In the same month, the company signed a co-development deal with Cocaban and SAMG Entertainment for their T5 property, while signing a distribution agreement with Spargo Productions and a representation deal for The Likeaballs.

In 2008, HIT underwent a range of sales for IPs previously put up for sale. They sold Guinness World Records to Ripley Entertainment in February, Magic Adventures of Mumfie back to Britt Allcroft in March and Sooty to his current presenter Richard Cadell in June. Alongside that, they had hired former Nickelodeon executive, Jeffrey D. Dunn, as chief executive. Dunn drove the company to create new characters, including Mike the Knight, and to revitalize existing brands. In March, HIT changed their North American home media distributor from 20th Century Fox to Lionsgate Home Entertainment. In April, HIT secured a first-look deal with israeli-based animation studio Smartoonz to secure distribution rights to Little Fables and to co-produce and represent Monkey See, Monkey Do and Clay Play. In October, HIT announced its next production, Little Charley Bear, under a co-production deal with Annix Entertainment, which they pre-sold to CBeebies in January 2009. In November, HIT licensed the Art Attack IP to Disney to revive the series for the Latin American market. This partnership eventually led to Disney purchasing the Art Attack property from HIT by 2011.

In March 2009, HIT started up a theatrical film division, entitled HIT Movies, in Los Angeles with Julia Pistor as division head, to create films based on the company's franchises. The division's first planned film adaptation was a live-action Thomas & Friends film, scheduled for late 2010. In May, HIT revealed three new properties put into their development slate - Mike the Knight, The Real Mees, and Kids Hate Clowns, the latter being a co-production with Firestep and Impossible Pictures. With the exception of Mike the Knight, the shows never materialized. In October, HIT announced a partnership with Little Airplane Productions to develop and co-produce original series. Its first joint production, Billy Birthday Boy, was screened at MIPCOM Jr. in October 2011, though the series never materialized. In October, Chapman Entertainment announced that they had taken over production for Little Charley Bear from HIT, although the company would remain as a distribution agent for television and home entertainment.

In early 2010, HIT licensed Thomas & Friends to Mattel for toys and struck a deal with the Albavisión conglomerate, to supply its television stations across Hispanic America with 600 hours worth of its catalog. In July, they announced another new series, Super School, which was showcased at MIPTV before the announcement in April, and had also never materialized. In August, the company withdrew from the JimJam joint venture, but agreed to continue providing programming for the channel until the absorption into Mattel.

In January 2011, HIT announced that they acquired TV rights to the Diary of a Worm book series, with the option to produce an animated television series set for a 2013 release window. In April, Apax put HIT up for sale, with the option to sell the company in two parts: Thomas & Friends franchise and the other HIT characters with its PBS Kids Sprout stake, with either part or separately. Several bidders came forward, including The Walt Disney Company, Viacom, Mattel, Hasbro, Classic Media, Chorion, and Saban Brands. By the end of the month, Fireman Sam was a Top 10 UK best-selling character toy according to NPD Group. Their next program Mike the Knight, a co-production between Nelvana aired on Treehouse TV and CBeebies later in the year.

=== 2012–2016: Mattel subsidiary ===
Apax Partners agreed to sell HIT Entertainment to Mattel on 24 October 2011 for $680 million excluding its share of the PBS Kids Sprout television channel. The sale/merger was completed on 1 February 2012, and HIT Entertainment became a wholly owned subsidiary of Mattel, which was managed under its Fisher-Price unit. Jeffrey Dunn departed as the company's CEO following the closing of the acquisition. Due to the success of the Thomas & Friends brand, which accounted for 80% of HIT's revenues, there was talks of Mattel only wanting to purchase that franchise rather than the entire HIT library. Mattel had already worked alongside HIT Entertainment and handled marketing for Thomas & Friends toys. On 3 July 2012, it was reported that Mattel considered selling and sought a buyer for Barney and Angelina Ballerina, but they eventually kept them.

HIT announced a North American DVD distribution deal with Universal Pictures Home Entertainment on 1 May 2014, in which Universal began distributing their catalogue for Blu-ray and DVD electronic sell-through and VOD platforms in the United States and Canada. Prior to MIPCOM 2014, Mattel reorganized and consolidated its internal media sales divisions for its other brands into HIT. In June, HIT announced that they would produce a television series based on Little People toyline, as their first series based on a Mattel property. In October, they announced that Canadian studio DHX Media would co-produce the series.

In early summer 2015, the Edaville USA amusement park in South Carver, Massachusetts opened a licensed Thomas Land theme area based on Thomas & Friends. On 6 October 2015, HIT Entertainment announced a long-term partnership with 9 Story Media Group to relaunch Barney & Friends and Angelina Ballerina. In December 2015, DHX Media expanded their agreement with HIT and Mattel to include worldwide distribution, development and production rights to Bob the Builder and Fireman Sam, alongside Mattel IPs Little People and Polly Pocket.

On 31 March 2016, HIT was absorbed into Mattel Creations (later known as Mattel Television).

== Filmography ==
Title	Original run	Network	Co-production with	Notes
Thomas & Friends	1984–2020	Children's ITV (series 1–3); Cartoon Network (series 4–5); Nick Jr. (series 6–11); PBS Kids (series 6 – 20); Channel 5 (series 12–24)	Clearwater Features (series 1–2); Nitrogen Studios (series 12–16); Arc Productions (series 17–20); Jam Filled Toronto (series 21–24)	Production taken over from The Britt Allcroft Company/Gullane Entertainment following its acquisition by and absorption into HiT and finished by Mattel Creations/Television
Fireman Sam	1987–1994; 2005–present	S4C; BBC 1 (series 1–4); CBeebies (series 5); Cartoonito (series 6 – present); Channel 5 (series 8 – present)	Bumper Films (1987–1994); Siriol Productions (2003–2008); HRTv (2008–2010); Xing Xing Management Group (2008–2017); Island of Misfits (2017–2020); WildBrain Studios (2020–present)	Production taken over from Gullane Entertainment (who acquired the brand in 2001) before being acquired by and absorbed into HiT
Pingu	1990–2000; 2003–2006	SF DRS/CBBC (original); CBeebies (revival)	The Pygos Group; TrickfilmsStudio	
Captain Zed and the Zee Zone	1991	Children's ITV	Tony Collingwood Productions Limited; DIC Enterprises; Scottish Television Enterprises	
Where's Wally?	1991	CBS (U.S.); Children's ITV (U.K.)	The Waldo Film Company; DIC Enterprises	
Barney & Friends	1992–2010	PBS Kids		Continued from The Lyons Group/Lyrick Studios
The Wind in the Willows	1995	ITV; The Family Channel	TVC London	Television film
Professor Bubble	1996–1997	ITV		
Percy the Park Keeper	1996–1999	ITV	Grand Slamm Children's Films	
The Enchanted World of Brambly Hedge	1996–2000	BBC One	Cosgrove Hall Films (series 1); HOT Animation (series 2)	
The Willows in Winter	1996	ITV; The Family Channel	TVC London	Television film
The Phoenix and the Carpet	1997	BBC		
Animal Ark	1997–1998	ITV	HTV; Zenith North; Harvest Entertainment	
Kipper	1997–2000	ITV	Grand Slamm Children's Films	
Big Sister, Little Brother	1997	SVT; Fox Family Channel	Wegelius TV; TMO Film GmbH	
The Three Friends and Jerry	1998–1999	SVT; Nickelodeon	Happy Life; TMO-Loonland	
Anthony Ant	1999	HBO Family; YTV	Funbag Animation Studios	
Bob the Builder	1999–2011	CBBC (series 1–4); CBeebies	HOT Animation; SD Entertainment; (series 17–18)	
Fly Tales	1999	France 3; WDR; Télétoon+; Teletoon	Futurikon; Motion International	
Ted Sieger's Wildlife	1999	ZDF	Hahn Film	
Faeries	1999	ITV; Starz!	Cartwn Cymru; United Productions	
Sheeep	2000–2001	CBBC	Grand Slamm Children's Films	
The Magic Key	2000–2001	BBC Two	Collingwood O'Hare Entertainment Limited	
Untalkative Bunny	2001–2003	Teletoon	Dynomight Cartoons; Big Al Productions	
Oswald	2001–2003	Nickelodeon	Nickelodeon Animation Studio	
Angelina Ballerina	2001–2006	ITV	Grand Slamm Children's Films	
Rubbadubbers	2003–2005	BBC Two; CBeebies	HOT Animation	
Wobbly Land	2007	Nick Jr. UK	Brown Bag Films	
Frances	2005	PBS Kids Sprout	The Jim Henson Company	
Angelina Ballerina: The Next Steps	2009–2010	PBS Kids	SD Entertainment	
Rainbow Magic: Return to Rainspell Island	2010	Direct-to-video	The Answer Studio	
Mike the Knight	2011–2017	Treehouse TV (Canada); CBeebies (UK); Nick Jr. (US)	Nelvana	
Bob the Builder	2015–2018	Channel 5 PBS Kids (series 1-2)	Mainframe Studios (series 1–2); DHX Studios Halifax (series 3)	Finished by Mattel Creations
Thomas & Friends: Railway Stories	2026–present	YouTube; Netflix	Mattel Studios	
