= DreamWorks Classics =

American entertainment company

Classic Media, LLC
- Logo for DreamWorks Classics

- Logo for Classic Media
- Trade name: DreamWorks Classics
- Type: Subsidiary
- Industry: Intellectual property
- Predecessors: United Productions of America; Golden Book Video; Total TeleVision productions; Filmation; Entertainment Rights; Tomorrow Entertainment; Cinema Shares International Distribution Corporation; The Harvey Entertainment Company; Chapman Entertainment
- Founded: May 2000; 26 years ago
- Founders: Eric Ellenbogen; John Engelman
- Headquarters: New York City, New York, U.S.
- Key people: Eric Ellenbogen; John Engelman; Margie Cohn; Claire Shaw (VP Consumer Products, United Kingdom)
- Revenue: US$82 million (2012)
- Net income: US$19 million (2012)
- Number of employees: 80 (2012)
- Parent: Entertainment Rights (2007–2009); Boomerang Media (2009–2012); DreamWorks Animation (2012–present)
- Subsidiaries: Big Idea Entertainment (in-name-only unit); Harvey Entertainment, Inc. (in-name-only unit)
- Website: www.dreamworks.com/classics

Classic Media, LLC, doing business as DreamWorks Classics, is an American entertainment company owned by DreamWorks Animation, a subsidiary of Universal Pictures, a division of NBCUniversal, which in turn is a subsidiary of Comcast. Founded in 2000 by Eric Ellenbogen and John Engelman, the studio's library consists of acquired intellectual property catalogs and character brands, as well as the licensing rights for various third-party properties. In 2012, Boomerang Media sold Classic Media to DreamWorks Animation, and began trading under the name DreamWorks Classics (the legal name is still Classic Media, LLC). DreamWorks Animation became a subsidiary of NBCUniversal in 2016.

== History ==
Classic Media was founded by Eric Ellenbogen and John Engelman in May 2000 after acquiring the United Productions of America (UPA) catalog and assets from the estate of Henry Saperstein. Frank Biondi, the former head of Universal Studios, and film producer Steve Tisch invested in the company. Classic Media then bought most assets of The Harvey Entertainment Company on March 11, 2001. On August 16, 2001, Classic Media and Random House won a joint bid for the assets of Western Publishing, with Classic Media acquiring the entertainment division (including the Dell Comics and Gold Key Comics libraries) and Random House acquiring the Little Golden Books publishing properties. Classic then purchased the rights to the Jay Ward characters and formed Bullwinkle Studios, a joint venture with Jay Ward Productions, to manage them sometime in 2002. On October 31, 2003, Classic Media purchased the assets of the bankrupt Big Idea Entertainment catalog. By 2007, Bullwinkle Studios became converted to a functioning studio.

On April 7, 2005, the company underwent a recapitalization led by a group of investors, including Spectrum Equity Investors and existing investors headed by Pegasus Capital Advisors. Additionally, a senior debt facility of $100 million was secured through a bank group led by JP Morgan Chase Bank. With the deal, Spectrum became the majority owner over the existing investors, with a representative on the company board of directors.

In August 2006, Classic Media announced a joint venture with ION Media Networks, NBCUniversal, Corus Entertainment and book publisher Scholastic Corporation to launch Qubo, a kids' entertainment network.

On December 14, 2006, it was announced that Classic Media would be acquired by UK-based rival Entertainment Rights for $210.0 million. Before the acquisition was completed, both companies announced distribution and production agreements with Genius Products LLC, replacing the Sony Wonder deal.

Entertainment Rights fell in to administration on April 1, 2009. On the same day, Boomerang Media LLC, formed by Ellenbogen and Engelman in 2008 with equity funding from GTCR, announced that it would acquire Entertainment Rights' principal UK and American subsidiaries, including Classic Media, Inc. and Big Idea Entertainment, from its administrators. On May 11, 2009, Boomerang Media announced that the former UK and American subsidiaries of Entertainment Rights would operate as a unified business under the name Classic Media, while Big Idea would operate under its own name.

Classic Media purchased the then-upcoming manga-inspired television series My Life Me from the bankrupt TV-Loonland AG on February 20, 2010 and later bought the Noddy and Olivia brands on March 7 and 19, respectively in 2012 from Chorion.

=== Sale to DreamWorks Animation (2012–present) ===
On July 23, 2012, DreamWorks Animation announced that they would acquire Classic Media for $155 million from Boomerang Media, with the deal closing in September of that year. Afterwards, Classic Media began trading as DreamWorks Classics to associate itself with its parent company, although the parent company remains under the Classic Media name.

On October 3, 2012, DreamWorks Classics made its first post-DreamWorks sale by securing licensing and distribution rights to Studio Hari's The Owl & Co outside of France and other French-speaking territories.

On September 17, 2013, DreamWorks Animation announced they had purchased the programming library of the British animation studio Chapman Entertainment, and placed distribution through DreamWorks' UK-based TV distribution operation.

On June 18, 2014, DreamWorks Animation bought the Felix the Cat brand and added it to the DreamWorks Classics portfolio.

On April 28, 2016, NBCUniversal announced it would buy out DreamWorks Animation in a $3.8 billion deal. The buyout was completed on August 22.

In January 2020, Classic Media pre-sold streaming rights to three series; Lassie, George of the Jungle and Mr. Magoo, by CBS All Access (now as Paramount+).

In the fall of 2025, a CGI-animated revival of Underdog title Underdog and the Canine Defenders premiered. It was co-produced by Spanish entertainment company DeAPlaneta Entertainment, French Superprod Animation and Italian Red Monk Studio, under license from Classic Media.

== Libraries ==
=== Catalogs ===
- United Productions of America (UPA) (Mr. Magoo, Gerald McBoing-Boing, and Dick Tracy) (excluding theatrical shorts which are still owned by Sony Pictures via Columbia Pictures, and theatrical films owned by third-party companies)
  - Several Godzilla films (under license from Toho)
- The library of The Harvey Entertainment Company (under Harvey Entertainment, Inc.) (Casper the Friendly Ghost, Little Audrey, Richie Rich and Baby Huey) (excluding co-productions owned by third-party companies and the live-action business)
  - Harvey Comics
  - The Famous Studios library released between October 1950 and February 1962, excluding Popeye films.
- Golden Books Family Entertainment/Western Publishing/Gold Key Comics (Pat the Bunny, Magnus, Robot Fighter, Doctor Solar, Man of the Atom, Turok and Little Lulu), including:
  - Broadway Video's former family entertainment library, including:
    - The pre-1974 Tomorrow Entertainment library
      - The pre-September 1974 Rankin/Bass Productions library (Rudolph the Red-Nosed Reindeer, The Little Drummer Boy, Frosty the Snowman, Santa Claus Is Comin' to Town and others)
    - Color Systems Technology, Inc.
      - Alan Enterprises
        - The Trans-Lux Television/Adventure Cartoon Productions library (Felix the Cat and The Mighty Hercules, but excluding the rights to Speed Racer)
        - The Edward Small library
    - Palladium Entertainment
      - Southbrook International Television
        - Jack Wrather Productions (Lassie, The Lone Ranger and Sergeant Preston of the Yukon)
    - Total TeleVision productions (Underdog and Tennessee Tuxedo and His Tales) (excluding the film adaptation of Underdog, owned by Disney)
  - Shari Lewis Enterprises (The Shari Lewis Show, Lamb Chop's Play-Along and The Charlie Horse Music Pizza)
- Big Idea Entertainment (VeggieTales, 3-2-1 Penguins! and Larryboy: The Cartoon Adventures)
- Entertainment Rights, including:
  - Carrington Productions International
  - Link Entertainment
  - Filmation (The Archie Show, Fat Albert and the Cosby Kids, He-Man and the Masters of the Universe and BraveStarr) (excluding third-party licensed properties)
  - Woodland Animations (Postman Pat, Gran, Bertha and Charlie Chalk)
  - Tell-Tale Productions (including Boo!, but excluding the rights to Tweenies, owned by BBC Studios)
  - Sleepy Kids (Dr. Zitbag's Transylvania Pet Shop, Budgie the Little Helicopter and Potsworth & Co.)
  - Maddocks Animation (The Family-Ness, Jimbo and the Jet-Set, Penny Crayon and The Caribou Kitchen)
  - Other programs formerly under Entertainment Rights that were produced by other production companies, such as The Basil Brush Show
- The Chapman Entertainment library (Fifi and the Flowertots, Roary the Racing Car, Little Charley Bear and Raa Raa the Noisy Lion)

=== Character brands ===
- Noddy
- Olivia
- Felix the Cat (via the Trans-Lux Television/Adventure Cartoon Productions catalog)
- Where's Waldo?
- Rupert Bear
- Masters of the Universe characters (via the Filmation catalog; under license from Mattel)
- Roger Ramjet

=== Joint ventures ===
- Bullwinkle Studios, a joint venture with Jay Ward Productions to produce and manage the Jay Ward catalog (including The Adventures of Rocky and Bullwinkle, Mr. Peabody & Sherman, Dudley Do-Right and George of the Jungle). DreamWorks' partnership with Bullwinkle Studios ended in February 2022 when the Ward estate partnered with WildBrain. DreamWorks continues to own its co-productions with Bullwinkle Studios.

=== Other rights ===
- Dream Defenders (worldwide distribution excluding North America and Asia)
- Life with Boys (worldwide distribution excluding Canada, UK, France, Australia, Latin America and Asia)
- My Life Me
- OOglies (worldwide distribution excluding UK television rights)
- Theodore Tugboat
- Tracy Beaker Returns (worldwide distribution excluding UK television rights)
- The Tribune Content Agency catalog (including Dick Tracy (via the UPA catalogue), Brenda Starr, Reporter, Gasoline Alley and Broom-Hilda)
- Voltron (under license from World Events Productions)
- The Owl & Co (Worldwide distribution excluding French-speaking territories)
