= Studio Liddell =

British animation studio

Studio Liddell Ltd.
- Company type: Private
- Industry: Animation, computer graphics, franchise licensing, children's entertainment, virtual reality, augmented reality
- Founded: 1996; 30 years ago in Manchester, Greater Manchester, UK
- Founder: Ian Liddell; Jon Liddell; Andrew Jones
- Headquarters: Manchester, United Kingdom
- Area served: Worldwide
- Website: studioliddell.com

Studio Liddell Ltd. is a British computer animation and imagery production studio based in Manchester, UK. It was founded in 1996 by Ian Liddell, Jon Liddell, and Andrew Jones. The company began by producing imagery for advertising and technical purposes and later successfully expanded into children's television creating shows such as Cloudbabies, Ranger Rob, and working on Roary the Racing Car, Let's Play, Raa Raa the Noisy Lion, and Fifi and the Flowertots. In recent years the company has also expanded into virtual reality and augmented reality technologies.

The company is based across two studios in Central Manchester and MediaCityUK.

== TV shows ==
- Cloudbabies

Part of co-production

- Ranger Rob (season 1)
- Roary the Racing Car
- Let's Play
- Raa Raa the Noisy Lion
- Fifi and the Flowertots

== Awards and nominations ==
Year	Award	Category	Nominee(s)	Result
2010	Big Chip Awards	International Award for Innovation	Bugbears website	Winner
2015	Museums + Heritage Awards	Innovation Award	Stonehenge Exhibition and Visitor Centre 'Standing in the Stones'	Nominated
2017	YMA Awards	Award of Excellence for Best Program, Animation, Ages 3–5	for Ranger Rob episodes "The Woolly Wiligo of Big Sky Park" / "A Big Sky Park Elephant Train"	Nominated
