= Chapman Entertainment =

British television production company

Chapman Entertainment Limited
- Formerly: Chapman Productions Limited (2001-2004)
- Industry: Television production
- Founded: 16 February 2001; 25 years ago
- Founders: Keith Chapman; Greg Lynn; Andrew Haydon
- Defunct: 25 August 2017; 9 years ago
- Fate: Dormancy, assets acquired by DreamWorks Animation
- Successor: DreamWorks Classics
- Headquarters: London, England
- Brands: Fifi and the Flowertots; Roary the Racing Car; Little Charley Bear; Raa Raa the Noisy Lion

Chapman Entertainment Limited was a British animation studio founded by Keith Chapman and Greg Lynn and based in London. The company focused on producing content aimed at pre-school audiences.

== History ==
=== 2001–2008 ===
The company was founded in London by Greg Lynn in 2001, together with Keith Chapman and Andrew Haydon, a former managing director of John Reid Entertainment, an artist management company. The company was created for the purpose of exploiting both the intellectual property rights of Chapman's creations and also those of interested third parties.

The company is structured to allow greater rewards and input to property creators. This developed from Chapman's own frustrations at his lack of involvement with his Bob the Builder character. He created the character in the early 1990s and struck a deal with HIT Entertainment which saw them further develop the character. The project was handed over to HOT Animation, specifically Jackie Cockle and Curtis Jobling, who took the basic title and premise of the show and ran with it, developing the project in-house from a blank canvas. The resulting show was commissioned by the BBC's children's department.

The company signed an exclusive development deal with Universal Pictures Home Video's subsidiary Vision Video Ltd. in June 2001 to produce new content that Universal would distribute. The company would produce a pilot for a girl-centric stop-motion animated series. Universal pulled out of the deal in 2003 following restructuring at their then-parent Vivendi Universal.

On 18 March 2004, Chapman announced that Channel 5 and Nick Jr. had greenlit their very first production - Fifi and the Flowertots for a simultaneous premiere in Spring 2005. On 1 September, the company entered into a distribution deal with Target Entertainment for Fifi outside of North America and the United Kingdom, which Chapman would continue to handle.

The global launch of Fifi and the Flowertots began on 2 May 2005 with its initial run on Five's children's programming block Milkshake!, and was followed up with its launch on Nick Jr. UK at the end of the month. Fifi and the Flowertots features the voice of Jane Horrocks as the voice of the title character. On 17 October, the company announced the launch of their second production - Roary the Racing Car, which would feature the voice roles of Peter Kay as Big Chris and racing driver Sir Stirling Moss as the narrator. Target Entertainment handled international distribution of the series, which was set to air in Spring 2007. The idea for the show was suggested by Brands Hatch employee David Jenkins.

On 31 March 2006, Fifi and the Flowertots was renewed for a second series, of which the first thirteen episodes would air shortly after the announcement and the remainder airing between the summer to the Spring of 2007. On 5 June 2006, Five and Nick Jr. acquired free and pay-TV rights to Roary the Racing Car.

Roary the Racing Car officially made its simultaneous premiere on both Five's Milkshake! and Nick Jr. in May 2007. On 19 June 2007, HIT Entertainment picked up distribution rights to Roary and Fifi in North America and Japan.

On June 5, 2008, the company announced that they would open a standalone studio in Altrincham, Cheshire, with the second series of Roary the Racing Car to be the first show produced within the studio. In September, the company expanded their deal with HIT Entertainment to include global theatrical show and attraction rights to their properties. On 1 October, Nickelodeon UK and Five recommissioned Fifi for a third series in 2009.

=== 2008–2013 ===
On 30 September 2009, Chapman announced the acquisition of the two upcoming preschool series Little Charley Bear and Rah Rah from HIT Entertainment and CCI Entertainment, respectively. Little Charley Bear was first announced by HIT in January as co-production with London-based animation studio Annix Studios and was already pre-sold to CBeebies initially for a broadcast later that year before being changed to 2011 after the acquisition. However, HIT would remain as the show's distribution agent for television and home entertainment. Rah Rah, later renamed as Raa Raa the Noisy Lion, was announced by CCI and Mackinnon & Saunders in April and had also been pre-sold to CBeebies for a 2011 release cycle. Both programmes would premiere on CBeebies later in 2011 as planned.

In July 2011, Chapman Entertainment announced the departure of their MD Greg Lynn ahead of massive company redundancies. "Soaring costs and challenging trading conditions" were listed as the reasons for the redundancies. The following month, the company announced that they had placed itself up for sale, blaming poor toy sales as the main cause.

On 28 February 2012, Chapman's distributor Target Entertainment was placed under administration by its owners Metrodome. Chapman secured a new non-US and UK distribution deal with Cake Entertainment for its entire catalogue the following month. In November 2012, Chapman Entertainment announced that the company would be placed into administration, again blaming poor toy sales as the main cause.

In September 2013, DreamWorks Animation acquired Chapman Entertainment's content library. The acquisition added to DreamWorks' growing library of family entertainment brands that also includes properties gained when it acquired Classic Media in 2012. The Chapman programs are now distributed through DreamWorks Distribution, DreamWorks Animation's UK-based TV distribution operation. The company went dormant after the library was acquired, and was fully dissolved in August 2017.

As of today, Chapman's shows in the United States are currently available on Peacock, NBCUniversal's streaming service.

== List of shows ==
- Fifi and the Flowertots (2005–2010)
- Roary the Racing Car (2007–2010)
- Little Charley Bear (2011–2015)
- Raa Raa the Noisy Lion (2011–2018)
