= Professor Bubble =

- Created by: Martin Beaumont; John Bullivant
- Written by: Martin Beaumont; Jeremy Bennett; Brian Jordan; Avril Rowlands; Laura Beaumont
- Directed by: David Crozier
- Starring: Gary Parker; Vicki Hopps; Phillip Eason; Joe Greco; Rebecca Clow; Sheila Clark; Brian Herring
- Opening theme: Bob Heatlie
- Country of origin: United Kingdom
- Original language: English
- No. of episodes: 65

Production
- Producers: David Crozier; Mark Wilson; Peter Orton; John Bullivant
- Running time: 20 minutes
- Production companies: HIT Entertainment; GMTV

Original release
- Network: ITV
- Release: 7 September 1996 – 12 April 1997

Professor Bubble was a live-action British pre-school series that aired on GMTV as part of its weekend children's programming block. The company produced the series in-house with HIT Entertainment, which ran for 65 twenty-minute episodes. The series was later re-run on Tiny Living in 2000.

== About the series ==
Professor Bubble was a live-action series that focused on a professor of the same name who was trying to create a book called The A–Z of Everything. The Professor has launched his house into the clouds, where it landed on Cloud 9. He observes the world and gathers information through the "bubblescope", a telescope that was created at the bottom of Cloud 9. The Professor is aided by his three helpers, Beamer, Mouse, and Quill, whose antics on Cloud 9 provide links to live-action educational segments. The series also contains scenes from the outside world with songs and stories from a character called Chromety, who appears and vanishes by holding her nose.

== Episodes (not in chronological order) ==
The episodes below are uploaded to YouTube by VideotapeFTW

- Treasure (1996)
- Astronauts (1996)
- Water (1996)
- Bed (1996)
- Body Language (1996)

== See also ==
- Puppetry
- Children's television series
