= Captain Zed and the Zee Zone =

British-American television series

- Created by: Tony Collingwood
- Developed by: Judy Rothman; Phil Harnage
- Directed by: Tony Collingwood
- Composers: Andrew Dimitroff; Stephen C. Marston; The Music Team; Barry Trop
- Countries of origin: United Kingdom; United States
- Original language: English
- No. of seasons: 2
- No. of episodes: 26

Production
- Executive producers: Chris O'Hare; Andy Heyward; Peter Orton; Sandy Ross
- Producer: Tony Collingwood
- Running time: 30 minutes
- Production companies: Tony Collingwood Productions Limited; Scottish Television Film Enterprises; DIC Enterprises; HIT Communications PLC

Original release
- Network: ITV Network (CITV)
- Release: 1991 – 1993

Captain Zed and the Zee Zone is an animated television series that aired on CITV in the United Kingdom from 1991-1993. The series was commissioned by Scottish Television and produced by Tony Collingwood Productions Limited in association with DIC Enterprises with HIT Communications PLC handling worldwide television distribution rights. The series centres on Captain Zed and his partner PJ, who in the Dream Zone, help protect children from nightmares. Despite having been co-produced in the United States and featuring voice actors mostly from Canada, this show has never aired in the North America nor has it ever had any official Region 1 home video or DVD releases.

In the UK, the series was split into two seasons, each with 13 episodes, and was first broadcast on October 17, 1991. The second series started airing on January 5, 1993. The show's last known broadcast in the United Kingdom was in 2009 on wknd@stv, a children's television strand on Scottish television channel, STV.

== Cast ==
- Julian Holloway as Captain Zed
- Jay Brazeau as Snort
- Garry Chalk as Captain Flannel
- Ian James Corlett as Mutter
- Wally Marsh as The Commander
- Pauline Newstone as Doris
- Venus Terzo as P.J.
- Dale Wilson as Larry
- Tomm Wright as Spring

=== Additional voices ===
- Long John Baldry
- Babz Chula
- Michael Donovan
- Christopher Gaze
- Shay Hampton
- Jeremy Jacobson
- Jesse Moss
- Katie Murray
- Margot Pinvidic
- Kristen R.
- Graham Rittenger
- Tony Sampson
- Andrew Seebaran
- Alan Shearman
- Kelly Sheridan
- Chelan Simmons
- Cyrus Thiedeke
- Chris Wilding
- Manny Combo

== Episodes ==
=== Season 1 (1991) ===
1. Making the Grade (story: David Ehrman; teleplay: David Ehrman and Tony Collingwood)
2. Curtain Call (story: Jocelyn Stevenson; teleplay: Jocelyn Stevenson, Judy Rothman, and Tony Collingwood)
3. Finishing School (story: Tony Collingwood; teleplay: Jack Hanrahan and Eleanor Burian-Mohr)
4. Revenge of the Killer Bunnies (story: Tony Collingwood; teleplay: Paul Dell and Steven Weiss
5. Nasty Norman (story: Tony Collingwood; teleplay: Tony Collingwood, Paul Dell, and Steven Weiss)
6. Follow the Leader (written by Alisa Marie Schudt)
7. Monster Factor (written by Tony Collingwood)
8. Catnapped (based on a story by Harvinda Sikmon, teleplay by Tony Collingwood)
9. Invasion Dreambase (written by Tony Collingwood)
10. Growing Pains (written by Phil Harnage and Charles Kaufman)
11. Christmas Nightmare (story: Phil Harnage and Tony Collingwood; teleplay: Tony Collingwood, Eleanor Burian-Mohr, Jack Hanrahan, and Judy Rothman)
12. Commander, I Shrunk the Dream Patrol (story: Phil Harnage, Paul Dell, and Steven Weiss; teleplay: Paul Dell and Steven Weiss)
13. Cries & Dolls (written by Judy Rothman)

=== Season 2 (1993) ===
1. Look Who's Dreaming (written by Tony Collingwood)
2. Farewell, My Bully (written by Tony Collingwood)
3. The Planet of the Hopeless Liars (written by Tony Collingwood, Steven Weiss, and Paul Dell)
4. A Dark Day's Night (written by Tony Collingwood, Jack Hanrahan, and Eleanor Burian-Mohr)
5. Send in the Clones (written by Judy Rothman)
6. The Curtain Monster Dream Eaters from Another Dimension (written by Tony Collingwood)
7. Lost in the Backpack (written by Tony Collingwood, Jack Hanrahan, and Eleanor Burian-Mohr)
8. Wedding Bells (written by Jocelyn Stevenson and Tony Collingwood)
9. I Want My Zed T.V. (written by Skip Sheppard and Tony Collingwood)
10. To Bee or Not to Bee (story by Selena D’Santos, teleplay by Tony Collingwood)
11. Mind Over Mutter (written by Paul Dell, Steven Weiss, and Tony Collingwood)
12. Computer Chaos (based on a story by Harvinda Sikmon, teleplay by Tony Collingwood)
13. Loch Ness Nightmare (written by Tony Collingwood)
