= Frankenstein's Cat =

2001 children's picture book

- Author: Curtis Jobling
- Language: English
- Genre: Children's picture book
- Published: September 1, 2001; 25 years ago (Simon & Schuster)
- Publication place: United Kingdom
- Media type: Print (hardback & paperback)
- Pages: 32
- ISBN: 0-689-84695-9

Frankenstein's Cat is a 2001 children's picture book written and illustrated by Curtis Jobling. The story follows the exploits of Doctor Frankenstein's first experiment. The cat is created by the Doctor out of nine different cats, leading to his name being Nine. He has no friends and feels lonely, which leads up to him asking the Doctor to create him a friend. Nine learns to be "careful what you wish for", as the Doctor creates a companion that is more than Nine can handle. The picture book was republished by Hodder.

== Characters ==
The main characters are Nine, Lottie, Dr Franken, Fifi, Heidi, Igora, Pipsquawk, Trevor, Sweeny, Bigtop, Mr Crumble and Gutner Van Halen.

=== Nine ===
Nine is Dr Frankenstein's first creation: a creature stitched together out of nine different cats (his name is also a pun on the myth that cats have nine lives). He has green eyes, a red nose, a pink head, an orange torso with stripes, a spotty green tail, and legs of different colours: blue, brown, red and maroon. Unfortunately for the Doctor, Nine isn't very menacing, although many might consider his smell to be quite frightening. Like all cats, he is naturally curious, and very playful. He might make mistakes sometimes, but he always means well. He is often tricked or bullied by his three ugly sisters, Igora, Heidi and Fifi. His best (and only) friend is Lottie, and he is fiercely protective of her. His voice is provided by comedian Joe Pasquale.

=== Lottie ===
8-year-old Lottie is the only girl in Oddsburg, and a relative newcomer. She is on good terms with Doctor Frankenstein, and considers Nine to be her best (and only) friend. She is mischievous by nature, but also kind-hearted, if a little lazy at times. Lottie is also fiercely determined and quite intelligent, easily able to hold her own with the boys. She is always shown wearing her glasses. Her voice is provided by Alex Kelly.

=== Dr Frankenstein ===
German-accented Dr Frankenstein aspires to be a brilliant mad scientist like all of his forefathers, and most of his time is spent dreaming up mad experiments. Unfortunately, most of his experiments turn out to be failures. Whenever he discards a failed monster, he throws it down into the castle's "Wrong Things" dungeon. Although Heidi, Igora and Fifi treat Nine with disdain, the Doctor isn't bothered with his first creation, although he wishes he could create something more fearsome. He doesn't seem to mind Lottie, and sometimes sends her strange gifts via Nine as a thank-you for sorting monster-related issues out. His voice is provided by Keith Wickham.

=== Fifi, Heidi and Igora ===
A dog, hamster and chicken, respectively. Nine's three ugly sisters are all very vain, and are fond of teasing Nine and playing nasty tricks on him. They seem to view the doctor with some contempt, and long for a more glamorous life. Heidi stands out from the others by being a "were-hamster".

=== Pipsquawk ===
Pipsquawk is the diminutive son of Oddsburg's Mayor, who constantly spoils him. He is the leader of the town's gang of four boys, and is usually the loudest one in proclaiming his hatred of girls. His arch-rival is Lottie, who is not only a girl, but a girl who is more talented than he is and on rare occasions, he and the other boys hatched plans to get rid of her. Despite his aggressive attitude, he's actually very cowardly, and has also been shown to be quite insecure. His voice is provided by Keith Wickham.

=== Trevor ===
Trevor, also known as Clever Trevor, is the intellectual member of the Oddsburg gang and its leader's closest associate. He wears thick glasses and has a lisp. Trevor keeps the first Big Boy's Book of Big Boy Stuff and often quotes from it. He wrote most of its entries. Keith Wickham voices him.

=== Sweeny ===
Sallow-skinned, goggle-eyed Sweeny is one of the four boys in Oddsburg and is considered to be the most disgusting. He takes an extensive interest in anything slimy, smelly or snotty, and also likes morbid and "scary" things (although he, like all the other Oddsburg villagers, is a coward). He follows along with what the gang is doing, but his maliciousness is nowhere near as intense as Pipsquawk or Trevor. Voice provided by Teresa Gallagher.

=== Bigtop ===
Bigtop is the gentle giant of Oddsburg's four boys. He has a simple mind and is often amused by things that would normally seem unbecoming of an Oddsburg boy, such as dollies or fairy cakes, but gets away with it because he's also very strong. Like Sweeny, he is mostly happy to play along with whatever else the other boys are doing. His father reads accountant tales to him as bedtime stories. He is voiced by Jimmy Hibbert.

=== Mr. Crumble ===
Mr. Crumble is Oddsburg's only teacher. His personality often variates between affable and paranoid, and usually utilizes both traits whilst teaching. He appears to be quite fond of Lottie because she actually takes an interest in learning, although this doesn't save Lottie from being bored to tears in class, just like the boys. Mr. Crumble also occasionally joins in the generic angry mob's rampaging. Voice provided by Jimmy Hibbert.

=== Gutner Van Halen ===
Van Halen, the "Monster Man" is a monster hunter who, as he puts it, "dedicated his life and limbs to their destruction", which is saying something, as he has sustained a few scars in his career; he lost his left arm whilst capturing a Two-Headed Transylvanian Zombie and lost his nose to a Giant Blood-Sucking Leech of the Black Lagoon. How he lost his left eye and his right leg are not known.

== Animated series adaptation ==
The book has also been adapted as an animated show by MacKinnon & Saunders in the United Kingdom, CCI Entertainment in Canada and Kayenta Productions in France. A digital 2D animation made entirely in Flash, Frankenstein’s Cat is aimed at the 6+ age group and consists of 30x11-minute episodes. The series generally follows the exploits of hyperactive Franken-pet Nine and his best (and only) friend Lottie as they outwit, outrun and generally outdo the citizens of Oddsburg.

France 3 aired the premiere the Monday before Halloween in 2007, the BBC aired the show in January 2008 and ABC1 aired the show in March 2008. The series was also sold to several global broadcasting markets including Singapore (Nickelodeon), South Africa (M-Net), Hong Kong (ATV), Brunei (RTB3), Portugal (RTP), Italy (RaiSat), Germany (KiKa and BFBS), Asia (HBO), Latin America (Nickelodeon), Thailand (True Spark), Australia (ABC1 and Nickelodeon), United Arab Emirates (e-Junior) and Malaysia (Nickelodeon).

Animation for the series was handled by A Productions in Bristol, and by Kayenta Productions in Paris.

Frankenstein's Cat won the Pulcinella for "Best Children's Show" at the Cartoons on the Bay Festival in 2008 and "Best TV Show" award at the BAF awards also in 2008.

=== Episodes ===
1. Tricky Spot
2. Brains
3. Lucky Ticket
4. Dust Up
5. Wall
6. Wrong Things
7. Witch!
8. Unlucky Day
9. Monster Man
10. The Apprentice
11. Halloween
12. Trapped
13. Pest in Show
14. New Best Friend
15. Freakshow
16. The Big Foot Burglar
17. A Tale of Tails
18. The Horror of Little Shops
19. Film
20. Hay Day
21. Weird Science
22. Tricky Spot (Series Finale)
