= Raa Raa the Noisy Lion =

British animated children's television series

- Created by: Curtis Jobling
- Developed by: Peter Saunders
- Creative director: Keith Chapman
- Voices of: Bradley Shedden; Oliver Dillon; Mia Hann; Eden Jarrett; Max Miller; Jamie Oram; Tyler Coleman; Kassian Akhtar; Joshua Lester; Mihajlo Bucevac; Alexander Molony; Audrey Newman; Rosa Strudwick; Rylea Whitehead; Tim Owen
- Narrated by: Lorraine Kelly
- Theme music composer: Alan Coates and Kim Goody
- Opening theme: Raa Raa the Noisy Lion
- Ending theme: Raa Raa the Noisy Lion
- Country of origin: United Kingdom
- Original language: English
- No. of series: 3
- No. of episodes: 78

Production
- Executive producers: Ian Mackinnon; Peter Saunders
- Producer: Keith Chapman
- Running time: 10 minutes
- Production companies: Chapman Entertainment (Series 1 & 2); DreamWorks Classic Productions (Series 3); Mackinnon & Saunders

Original release
- Network: CBeebies
- Release: 2 May 2011 – 22 January 2018

Raa Raa the Noisy Lion is a British stop motion animated children's television programme first broadcast in May 2011, which is shown on CBeebies. It features a group of animal-based characters and their adventures and activities through the Jingly Jangly Jungle. The show is narrated by Lorraine Kelly and is produced by Chapman Entertainment (series one and two) and DreamWorks Classic Productions (series three).

== Characters ==
- Raa Raa (voiced by Bradley Shedden in series one and two, and Tyler Coleman in series three): A fun-loving and noisy little lion.
- Topsy (voiced by Eden Jarrett): A giraffe who loves to read. She is the tallest and oldest of Raa Raa's friends. She can sometimes be bossy, but she is the one that wants to help her friends as well as she can.
- Zebby (voiced by Mia Hann in series one and two, and Audrey Newman in series three): A kind and gentle zebra who sometimes gets hungry.
- Huffty (voiced by Oliver Dillon): An elephant who loves music and giving his friends a ride on his train.
- Ooo Ooo (voiced by Jamie Oram in series one and two, and Alexander Molony in series three): A fun-loving monkey who likes to swing on vines.
- Crocky (voiced by Max Miller in series one and two, and Mihajlo Bucevac in series three): A crocodile who likes to hang out by the river and ride in his log boat.
- Pia (voiced by Rylea Whitehead): A parrot who likes to fly high in the air. She debuted in series three.
- Scuttle: A purple spider who has eight legs. She debuted in series three.

== Development ==
The series was first announced by Canadian entertainment company CCI Entertainment on 1 April 2009, being pre-sold to CBeebies for a May 2011 delivery cycle. In October, Chapman Entertainment took over CCI's role as co-producer.

== Episodes ==
=== Series overview ===
Series	Episodes	Originally released	
Series	Episodes	First released	Last released
1	26	2 May 2011	14 November 2011
2	26	30 January 2012	10 July 2012
3	26	6 November 2017	22 January 2018

=== Series 1 (2011) ===
No. overall	No. in season	Title	Original release date
1	1	"A Time to be Quiet, A Time to be Loud"	2 May 2011
It's quiet time in the jungle, and the pals are napping. Raa Raa is woken by a butterfly, but it flys away. He wakens Topsy and Huffty to help him find the butterfly. Topsy says the butterfly will come if they are quiet. Raa Raa goes and wakens Ooo Ooo. The others join them and they work at being quiet, which Raa Raa finds difficult. They succeed and the butterfly returns. Topsy has an accident and knocks down a coconut from a tree. Just as it is about to fall on the butterfly Raa Raa roars and scares the butterfly to safety, showing that there is a time to be quiet and a time to be loud.
2	2	"The Right Sound"	9 May 2011
Raa Raa is trying to finish a tune. He hears some music and finds Hufty who is making a 'toot stick' bur Raa Raa accidentally breaks part of it. They search for a matching sound. Meeting Ooo Ooo on the way. They find Lofty Zebby and Crocky having a picnic. One of the bottles makes the right sound! The pals finish Raa Raa's tune together, and have fun making music together.
3	3	"Huffty Loses His Voice"	10 May 2011
4	4	"Raa Raa Finds a Voice"	11 May 2011
5	5	"Zebby’s Snack Time"	12 May 2011
Raa Raa shares Zebby's snack with the pals, but there's nothing left for Zebby. Raa Raa organizes the gang to make a snack and drinks for everyone, Zebby is happy again.
6	6	"Finding Noisy"	13 May 2011
7	7	"Ooo Ooo’s Jungle Drums"	16 May 2011
8	8	"Topsy’s Musical Stones"	17 May 2011
9	9	"Raa Raa’s Noisy Present"	18 May 2011
10	10	"Raa Raa’s Big Roar"	19 May 2011
11	11	"Scritch Scratch"	20 May 2011
12	12	"Hurry Up Raa Raa"	23 May 2011
13	13	"Rumble in the Jungle"	24 May 2011
14	14	"Raa Raa’s Favourite Noise"	25 May 2011
15	15	"Ooo Ooo Slips Up"	26 May 2011
16	16	"No Sleep Til Bedtime"	27 May 2011
17	17	"Raa Raa’s Rainy Day"	30 May 2011
18	18	"Two’s Company"	1 June 2011
Crocky and Raa Raa are playing. Every time Ooo Ooo arrives they are just moving on to the next game. He thinks they don't want to play with him. He talks to Topsy, and decides to go back and make them laugh. They tell him they like playing with him and play a skipping game for three.
19	19	"Lots of Raa’s in the Jungle"	2 June 2011
20	20	"Raa Raa’s Favourite Things"	3 June 2011
21	21	"Jungle Jiggles"	7 November 2011
22	22	"Raa Raa's Great Big Noise"	8 November 2011
23	23	"Raa Raa's Naptime Story"	9 November 2011
24	24	"Go Bananas"	10 November 2011
25	25	"Clangy Bangy Crocky"	11 November 2011
26	26	"Raa Raa's New Noise"	14 November 2011

=== Series 2 (2012) ===
No. overall	No. in season	Title	Original release date
27	1	"Crocky’s Wobbly Tooth"	30 January 2012
Crocky's tooth is loose. Topsy looks it up and says it must fall out by itself. Raa Raa and Crocky and the gang try various methods to encourage it. Finally it comes out when Crocky is eating an apple. Then Raa Raa has a loose tooth!
28	2	"Littlest Laugh"	31 January 2012
29	3	"Hide and Toot"	1 February 2012
30	4	"Boing Boing"	2 February 2012
31	5	"Catch Me If You Can"	3 February 2012
32	6	"Raa Raa's Whistle Worries"	6 February 2012
33	7	"Raa Raa Gets Hiccups"	7 February 2012
34	8	"Ooo Ooo's Wriggly Jiggly Game"	8 February 2012
35	9	"Raa Raa's Perfect Present"	9 February 2012
36	10	"Raa Raa the Copycat"	10 February 2012
37	11	"The Monkey That Roared"	13 February 2012
38	12	"Something New"	14 February 2012
39	13	"Raa Raa's Big Book of Noises"	15 February 2012
Raa Raa and Topsy are making books for storytime, but Raa Raa ruins Topsy's new book.
40	14	"Doctor Raa Raa"	16 February 2012
41	15	"Raa Raa's Noisy Challenge"	25 June 2012
42	16	"Catch That Page"	26 June 2012
Topsy is reading a book, but Raa Raa wants to play chase. Raa Raa and the others leave Topsy with her book, but keep disturbing her. Just as she's finishing they arrive again, and the last page blows away. The pals chase the page, trying in turn to catch it. Finally they succeed, and Topsy finishes her book. The others ask her to read the book to them.
43	17	"Raa Raa Gets Squeaky"	27 June 2012
44	18	"Wake Up Huffty"	28 June 2012
45	19	"Gone Fishing"	29 June 2012
46	20	"The Lion’s Share"	2 July 2012
47	21	"Raa Raa's New Game"	3 July 2012
48	22	"Raa Raa Can Do It"	4 July 2012
49	23	"Crocky’s Coconut"	5 July 2012
50	24	"Kings and Queens of the Jungle"	6 July 2012
51	25	"Raa Raa Goes Hunting"	9 July 2012
52	26	"The Noisiest House in the Jungle"	10 July 2012

=== Series 3 (2017–18) ===
No. overall	No. in season	Title	Original release date
53	1	"Raa Raa and the Boomy Thunder"	6 November 2017
54	2	"Raa Raa and the Rainy Stick"	7 November 2017
55	3	"Raa Raa and the Junglephone"	8 November 2017
56	4	"Raa Raa and the Zippy Zip Wire"	9 November 2017
57	5	"Raa Raa and the Noisy Story"	10 November 2017
58	6	"Raa Raa and the Jingly Jangly Jungle Band"	13 November 2017
59	7	"Raa Raa and the Banana Balloons"	14 November 2017
60	8	"Raa Raa and Crocky's Lost Toy"	15 November 2017
61	9	"Raa Raa and Hooting Huffty"	16 November 2017
62	10	"Raa Raa and the Jungle Lookout"	17 November 2017
63	11	"Raa Raa and the Noisy Mystery"	20 November 2017
64	12	"Raa Raa and the Coolest Hello"	21 November 2017
65	13	"Raa Raa and the Bell Flowers"	22 November 2017
66	14	"Raa Raa and the Funniest Laugh"	23 November 2017
67	15	"Raa Raa and the Ladybird Den"	24 November 2017
68	16	"Raa Raa and the Speedy Racers"	8 January 2018
69	17	"Raa Raa and the Jungle Fixers"	9 January 2018
70	18	"Raa Raa and the Jingly Jungle Show"	10 January 2018
71	19	"Raa Raa and the Jungle Gym"	11 January 2018
72	20	"Raa Raa and the Drip Drop Waterfall"	12 January 2018
73	21	"Raa Raa and the Noisy Nap"	15 January 2018
74	22	"Raa Raa and the Jungle Journey"	16 January 2018
75	23	"Raa Raa and Poorly Pia"	17 January 2018
76	24	"Raa Raa Goes Clickety Clack"	18 January 2018
77	25	"Raa Raa and the Night Noises"	19 January 2018
78	26	"Raa Raa Plays Do What I Do"	22 January 2018
