= Gordon the Garden Gnome =

2005–2006 British-Australian children's TV series

- Genre: Animation; Preschool
- Created by: Allan Plenderleith
- Voices of: Alan Titchmarsh; Maria Darling; Dan Freedman; David Holt; Rob Rackstraw; Barry Tarallo; D Brooks Haydn; James Keller; Elaine Torres; Nanique Gheridian; Tom Alexander; Heath Kelts
- Countries of origin: United Kingdom; Australia
- Original language: English
- No. of episodes: 52

Production
- Running time: 10–12 min.
- Production companies: Collingwood O'Hare; Southern Star Entertainment; Suzhou Hong Ying Animation Company Limited

Original release
- Network: CBeebies (UK); ABC Kids (Australia)
- Release: 2005 – 2006

Gordon the Garden Gnome is an animated children's television series aimed at getting children interested in gardening. Gordon is a happy garden gnome, whose voice is provided by british TV gardening presenter Alan Titchmarsh. The series aired from 2005 to 2006.

== Synopsis ==
The series focuses on the title character. Gordon the Garden Gnome tries his best to help the environment and the animals living in his garden, with the help of his gnome friends Percy (Voiced by David Holt), Ian (voiced by Maria Darling), Rosie (also voiced by Maria Darling) and Jerome (voiced by Dan Freedman). There is also a worm named Andrew (also voiced by David Holt), slugs named Lez (also voiced by Dan Freedman) & Dez (voiced by Rob Rackstraw), a squirrel named Daphne, a mole named Morris and many others.

== Production ==
The series first started development in 2002. The series was originally commissioned by Collingwood O'Hare for CITV. For some reason however the programme's development was taken by the BBC, as a result, the programme aired on CBeebies, the newest channel in the UK at the time dedicated solely to air preschool programming.

The series was produced in the United Kingdom by Collingwood O'Hare and in Australia by Southern Star Entertainment. Animated by Suzhou Hong Ying Animation Company Limited in 2004 in China.

== Telecast ==
The series premiered on CBeebies and ABC Kids in 2005. The series also aired in the USA on Cartoon Network's Tickle-U television programming block. The series has also been shown on KiKa in Germany.

== Home media and online streaming ==
The series' DVDs were released by Paramount Home Entertainment in the late 2000s. Episodes can also be found on Puddle Jumper - Cartoons produced by Southern Star on YouTube (which also has some other shows all created by Southern Star). Tubi has also uploaded the entire show as well.
