= Keith Chapman =

British television writer and producer

- Born: Keith Vincent Chapman; 1 December 1958 (age 67); Great Yarmouth, Norfolk, England
- Occupations: Television writer, producer
- Years active: 1980s–present
- Known for: Bob the Builder; Fifi and the Flowertots; Roary the Racing Car (executive producer); Paw Patrol; Mighty Express
- Children: 4

Keith Vincent Chapman (born 1 December 1958) is a British television writer and producer, known for creating various children's television programmes, most notably Bob the Builder and Paw Patrol.

== Early life ==
Chapman originates from Norfolk, East Anglia, though some of his formative years were spent in Basildon, Essex where he went to Nicholas Comprehensive School. He attended art college at Great Yarmouth College of Art and Design in Great Yarmouth.

== Career ==
He worked for Jim Henson International, designing characters related to the Muppets, before leaving to pursue a career in advertising.

While freelancing as an agency art director in the early 1990s, Chapman worked on his own creations, one of them being Bob the Builder, who was created after he spotted a JCB backhoe loader on a work site and thought they could bring it to life with cartoon eyes, which became the character Scoop (then named "Digger"), followed by other machines, and then thought the machines needed a human operator, which led to the creation of Bob, eventually showing it and his other creations to Peter Orton, executive chairman of HIT Entertainment, and Orton, sensing potential in Bob the Builder, acquired the intellectual property rights and created a television show based on the property. The deal saw Chapman retain a share of the copyright and also a contractual clause which sees his name appear on all merchandise related to the character, including an appearance in the blockbuster film Elf.

Bob the Builder was produced at Manchester's HOT Animation studio, with Curtis Jobling's character and set designs. As of 2005 the show had generated around £1 billion in international retail sales. Chapman invested his share of the profits to set up his own television production and rights ownership company, Chapman Entertainment, stating his belief that "the closer involvement of creative talent can get more out of a property over the longer term".

Chapman also created Fifi and the Flowertots in 2005, produced Roary the Racing Car in 2007, and created Spin Master's Paw Patrol in 2013.

In 2020, a new show by Chapman named Mighty Express was announced, premiering on Netflix in September of the same year.

In 2022, Chapman partnered with MXT to create an NFT project called Moonie Moo.

== Personal life ==
Chapman resides in Monaco. His son William is the co-founder of kid's clothing brand Roarsome.
