= Mackinnon & Saunders =

British animation studio

Mackinnon & Saunders is a British traditional stop-motion animation studio. It is based in Altrincham in Trafford, Greater Manchester. The studio both produces its own animations and creates puppets for other studios' productions.

The studio was founded by Ian Mackinnon and Peter Saunders, who had previously worked at Cosgrove Hall Films on such films as The Reluctant Dragon, The Fool of the World, and The Wind in the Willows.

Films they have created puppets for include Mars Attacks!, Corpse Bride, Frankenweenie, Fantastic Mr. Fox, and Guillermo del Toro's Pinocchio. Television series they have created puppets for include Postman Pat, Fifi and the Flowertots, and Pingu.
