= Eric Ellenbogen =

American entertainment executive

- Born: March 9, 1957 (age 69); Los Angeles, California, U.S.
- Education: Harvard University; University of California, Los Angeles (MBA)
- Occupation: Entertainment executive
- Known for: Founding DreamWorks Classics, President of Marvel Enterprises (former)
- Spouse: Dominic Ramos-Ruiz

Eric Ellenbogen (born March 9, 1957) is an American entertainment executive known for co-founding DreamWorks Classics and being CEO of Marvel Enterprises from 1998 to 1999. He was CEO and vice chairman of WildBrain from 2019 to 2023.

== Education ==
Ellenbogen graduated from Harvard University in 1978 and the UCLA Anderson School of Management in 1982.

== Career ==
In 1987, Ellenbogen became head of Broadway Video. In 1996, he became president of Golden Books Family Entertainment. Ellenbogen was CEO and president of Marvel Enterprises from November 1998 to July 1999.

Together with John Engelman in May 2000, Ellenbogen launched Classic Media. After the sale of Classic Media to Entertainment Rights in 2007, Ellenbogen left the company, along with Engelman. The two collaborated in January 2008 with GTCR to form Boomerang Media, LLC. Boomerang Media purchased Entertainment Rights in 2009, bringing Classic Media back under his control.

In 2012, DreamWorks Animation acquired Classic Media and renamed it DreamWorks Classics. At that time, he became the head of DreamWorks Animation's television division, DreamWorks International Television. Later in 2016, DreamWorks Animation and its assets, including DreamWorks Classics, was purchased by NBCUniversal. DreamWorks Classics, reverted to the Classic Media name, was restarted with Ellenbogen as co-president and co-head of DreamWorks International Television.

In 2018, he joined the board of directors of Canadian animation company WildBrain. He was named WildBrain's CEO and board vice chairman in August 2019 and left the company in 2023.

Preceded by Joseph Ahearn	Marvel Enterprises CEO; 1998-1999	Succeeded by F. Peter Cuneo
Preceded by Gerard Calabrese	Marvel Enterprises President; 1998-1999	Succeeded by F. Peter Cuneo
