= Bob the Builder (character) =

- Bob the Builder character
- Bob as he appears in the original series and Project: Build It
- First appearance: Unaired Pilot Episode (1997; unofficial); Scoop Saves the Day (1999; official)
- Created by: Keith Chapman
- Designed by: Curtis Jobling
- Voiced by: Neil Morrissey (UK, 1999–present); Rob Rackstraw (UK, 2007–2011) (Note: live shows, video games, and the official website.); William Dufris (US, 2001–2005); Greg Proops (US, 2005–2007); Marc Silk (US, 2007–2011); Lee Ingleby (UK, 2015 reboot); Colin Murdock (US, 2015 reboot); David Holt (UK, 2015 reboot (young)); Anthony Ramos (untitled upcoming film)

In-universe information
- Full name: Robert
- Nicknames: Bob; Bob the Builder; Bobby
- Gender: Male
- Occupation: General Contractor
- Family: Robert (father); Dorothy (mother); Tom (brother); Billy (grandfather)
- Nationality: British

Bob, better known as Bob the Builder, is the titular protagonist of the British animated programme of the same name. He is a general contractor with his own construction yard in Bobsville (original series), Sunflower Valley (Project: Build It), Fixham Harbour (Ready, Steady, Build!), or Spring City (2015 series) depending on the programme.

Bob's catchphrase is "Can we fix it?", to which other characters reply "yes we can".

Bob has appeared in every episode in the series and all related media and has a business partner, secretary, laborer and best friend named Wendy, as well as five main anthropomorphic construction vehicles that help him out: Scoop the backhoe loader, Muck the bulldozer, dumper and dump truck, Lofty the mobile crane, Dizzy the cement mixer and Roley the road roller, together known as the Can-Do Crew. Additional vehicles appear in Project: Build It, Ready, Steady, Build!, and the 2015 series.

== Design ==
The character's appearance was created by Curtis Jobling. His character sketches initially showed him with a moustache but this made him seem too old for the target audience of preschool children and so he was then restyled as clean-shaven. As stop-motion animation requires frequent repositioning of the models, Bob was given large feet for stability.

In 2014, the toy company Mattel bought the rights to the character and gave him a Hollywood-style makeover, making him seem younger and slimmer and more realistically proportioned. This was not well-received on social media, with many users decrying Bob's new look as unconvincing. His 2015 redesign has five fingers on each hand, instead of four.

== Legacy ==
Bob has helped to change negative stereotypes of general contractors and laborers among preschool children. In respect of the appearance of anthropomorphic construction vehicles or tools, the cartoon programme is similar to the series Construction Site, the Thomas & Friends spin-off Jack and the Sodor Construction Company, and Handy Manny.

== Film adaptation ==
In January 2024, Mattel announced that a film adaptation of the animated character will be produced by Jennifer Lopez and Benny Medina. The plot will follow Bob as he visits Puerto Rico for a construction job. Anthony Ramos was announced to be voicing Bob.
