= Sophie Turner Laing =

British businesswoman and media executive (born 1960)

Sophie Turner Laing OBE
- Born: Sophie Henrietta Turner Laing; 7 September 1960 (age 65)
- Occupation: Television executive
- Employer(s): BBC (1998–2003); BSkyB (2003–2014); Endemol Shine Group (2014–2020)
- Organization: HIT Entertainment (Co-Founder)
- Known for: Endemol Shine Group, (CEO)
- Title: chief executive officer
- Term: December 2014 – July 2020
- Parent(s): Graham Turner Laing & G. V. Turner Laing

Sophie Henrietta Turner Laing, OBE (born 7 September 1960) is a British businesswoman and media executive. She was chief executive officer of global content creator, producer and distributor Endemol Shine Group from December 2014 until July 2020. Prior to taking up that role, she held a number of senior positions at Sky in the UK, including their director of film and managing director of content. She previously worked for the BBC as the acting director of television and, along with Peter Orton and Jim Henson, was a founder of HIT Entertainment. In March 2022, she was named Chair of National Film and Television School.

== Early life ==
Turner Laing was born on 7 September 1960 to Graham Turner Laing and G. V. Turner Laing. She was educated at Oakdene School, a boarding school in Buckinghamshire. She didn't attend a university.

== Career ==
After finishing school, Turner Laing completed a secretarial course and worked as an events secretary for the Variety Club of Great Britain. She then spent two years working in public relations and radio in Australia. She returned to the United Kingdom in 1982.

She began her television career as a secretary at Elstree Studios in the distribution side of Henson International Television, a division of The Jim Henson Company. She was promoted through a number of positions and rose to become the sales director. During this time she worked on The Muppet Show. In 1989, she and Peter Orton established HIT Entertainment, after purchasing the Henson International Television division from The Jim Henson Company. In 1995, she joined Flextech Television working as a buyer of content.

In 1998, she moved to the British Broadcasting Corporation (BBC), where she worked as controller of programme acquisitions for five years. She was involved in the buying of programmes such as Band of Brothers and the first season of 24 for the company. From December 2000 to March 2001, she held the additional role of acting director of marketing and communications. She ended her time at the BBC as acting director of television.

In 2003, she left the BBC for BSkyB. In March of that year she was appointed director of movies. In April 2004, she became deputy managing director of Sky Networks, therefore deputy head of all Sky channels except Sky Sports. In March 2007, she joined the executive of the company as managing director of content. In that role, she is responsible for the companies portfolio of entertainment and news channels. She launched a new channel, Sky Atlantic, in 2011. In May 2014, she left BSkyB.

== Honours ==
Turner Laing has been honoured with a Royal Television Society (RTS) Fellowship for her "outstanding contribution" to British television, as well as the inaugural MIPTV Médaille d'Honneur for her contribution to television globally. In January 2016 she received the Brandon Tartikoff Legacy Award in recognition of "extraordinary passion, leadership, independence and vision in the process of creating television programming."

In the 2018 Queen's Birthday Honours, she was appointed an Officer of the Order of the British Empire (OBE) "for services to the media".

Business positions
| Preceded by Vacant | CEO of Endemol Shine Group; December 2014– | Succeeded by Incumbent |
