= Collingwood & Co. =

British television animation studio

- Type: Animation studio
- Founded: 1988; 38 years ago
- Founder: Tony Collingwood; Christopher O'Hare
- Headquarters: 10-14 Crown Street, London, England
- Website: www.collingwoodandco.co.uk

Collingwood & Co. (formerly Collingwood O'Hare Productions) is a British animation studio based in London headed by writer and director Tony Collingwood. They are known for animated television series like Oscar's Orchestra, Dennis the Menace, Gordon the Garden Gnome, Yoko! Jakamoko! Toto!, The Secret Show, and The Cat in the Hat Knows a Lot About That!, among others.

The company has been dormant since 2019.

== List of television series ==
- Captain Zed and the Zee Zone (1991)
- Oscar's Orchestra (1995–1996)
- Dennis and Gnasher (1996–1998)
- Pond Life (1996–2000)
- Animal Stories (1999–2002)
- The Magic Key (2000–2001)
- Eddy & the Bear (2001–2002)
- Yoko! Jakamoko! Toto! (2003–2005)
- Harry and His Bucket Full of Dinosaurs (2005–2008)
- Gordon the Garden Gnome (2005–2006)
- The Secret Show (2006–2007)
- The Cat in the Hat Knows a Lot About That! (2010–2018)
- Ruff-Ruff, Tweet and Dave (2015–2019)

Television specials

- RARG (1988)
- Daisy-Head Mayzie (1995)
- The King's Beard (2002)

Direct-to-video

- Thumbelina (1992)
