= Fifi and the Flowertots =

British animated children's television show

- Genre: Children's television series
- Created by: Keith Chapman
- Voices of: Jane Horrocks; Maria Darling; Tim Whitnall; Marc Silk; Joanna Ruiz; Janet James; John Thomson
- Theme music composer: Alan Coates; Kim Goody (vocals)
- Opening theme: "Fifi's Theme Tune" by Kim Goody
- Country of origin: United Kingdom
- Original language: English
- No. of series: 3
- No. of episodes: 117

Production
- Running time: 10 minutes
- Production company: Chapman Entertainment

Original release
- Network: Nick Jr. Five
- Release: 2 May 2005 – 5 July 2010

Related
- Roary the Racing Car

Fifi and the Flowertots is a British pre-school children’s animated television series created by Keith Chapman (who also created the Bob the Builder series) that ran from 2 May 2005 to 5 July 2010. The series was commissioned by Channel 5 and Nick Jr. and was the first production produced by Chapman Entertainment. Cosgrove Hall Films handled animation production for its first two series while Chapman took over stop-motion production in-house for the third, with newly-added CGI sequences produced by Studio Liddell.

The series features a group of flower-and-insect-based characters doing activities and having adventures through the garden. Fifi Forget-Me-Not (the title character and hostess) and Primrose were voiced by Jane Horrocks, while the other characters were voiced by Maria Darling, Tim Whitnall, Marc Silk and John Thomson. The music is produced by Alan Coates and Kim Goody, who worked on Tiny Planets.

== Characters ==
- Fifi Forget-Me-Not (voiced by Jane Horrocks) is a forget-me-not who is the cheerful hostess and main character of the series. When she forgets what to do, she says: "Fiddly Flowerpetals!" before describing the problem for the audience to guess, and when she remembers, another character says: "Fifi Forget-Me-Not forgot!" while her catchphrase, sometimes, when she forgets what to do, is "Buttercups and Daisies!" and when something is wrong she says: "Diggly Dandelions!" She likes to cook and look after plants, lives in a watering can house, and loves her stuffed toy rabbit, Cottonsocks.
- Bumble (Fuzzbuzz in the US) (voiced by Marc Silk) is a good-natured bumblebee and Fifi's best friend, who often visits her and is always ready to rescue her, but he is not good at landing and usually crashes. His catchphrases are "Wiggly Worms!" and "Bouncing Blueberries!" He is also helpful, but almost every time he tries to help Fifi remember something, he often adds to the confusion.
- Aunt Tulip (voiced by Tim Whitnall) is Fifi's aunt who likes to have tea parties and conversations with the Flowertots. Her personality is described as very motherly and lively. She lives in a pineapple house and has a small pet grub named Grubby, who often goes missing easily. Her catchphrase is "Sweet Potatoes!" and she loves tropical things and Hawaiian culture.
- Buttercup (voiced by Joanna Ruiz) is a buttercup who lives in a milk bucket house with her twin sister, Daisy. She has a stuffed toy mouse named Cornflower, has a fun-loving, excitable and lively personality, and frequently has good intentions, but she ends up causing problems as she is often unaware of the consequences. Whenever she and Daisy play with Pip, Buttercup comes off as irritated.
- Daisy (voiced by Janet James) is a daisy who is shy and dreamy, like her twin sister Buttercup, but is slightly clumsy. She adores her stuffed toy duckling named Diddyduck and her personality is affectionate and polite. Daisy had her head in the clouds in the first two seasons, but her name was never mentioned until Season Three. She and Buttercup love playing games with Pip.
- Poppy (Poppady in the US) (voiced by Maria Darling) is a poppy and one of Fifi's friends who is boisterous and very hard-working. She has a market stall where she sells everything the Flowertots need for each episode and lives in a pumpkin house.
- Primrose (voiced by Jane Horrocks) is a primrose and another of Fifi's friends. She is prim and proper and does not like getting messy, always wanting to look her best and getting upset when something goes wrong for her. Primrose also likes to create apparel for herself and tries to dress Fifi up. Her catchphrase is "I am NOT having a good day!" Sometimes, when Primrose does better, she says "Bothering Bluebells!".
- Violet (voiced by Maria Darling) is a violet and another of Fifi's friends. She is very creative and loves painting. Violet lives with Primrose in a marrow house and is much more elegant, graceful and kind-hearted, regarding to Primrose.
- Pip Gooseberry (voiced by Maria Darling) is a gooseberry who is the youngest of the Flowertots besides Buttercup and Daisy. He likes to help Fifi and Bumble in the garden, despite being sometimes noisy and getting excited easily. Fifi looks after Pip when Stingo and Slugsy play tricks on him. While he may come off as overly energetic to some people due to his young age, he has a big heart and genuinely cares about everyone. Pip lives in the gooseberry bushes in his playground and his catchphrases are "Golly Goosegogs!" and "Golly Gooseberries!", although, on rare occasions, he says "Great Green Goosegogs!"
- Stingo (voiced by Tim Whitnall) is a short-tempered wasp who causes trouble for the Flowertots, tries to steal food (such as cakes, blueberries, and chocolate), and lives in a red apple house. His catchphrase is "Rotten Raspberries!" Though Stingo is naughty, he surprisingly has some good intentions, and has a brother-like relationship with his sidekick and best friend, Slugsy.
- Slugsy (voiced by Marc Silk) is a simple-minded slug and Stingo's sidekick who lives with him in his house and speaks with a lisp. He is always ready to help Stingo, but he is slow and often accidentally ruins his plans. He also has a crush on Primrose, but does not want to admit it.
- Flutterby (voiced by Tim Whitnall) is a butterfly who takes Buttercup and Daisy around the garden and has a landing pad near their house.
- Webby (voiced by Maria Darling) is a spider who is the eldest and the wisest resident of Flowertot Garden. The Flowertots ask her for advice and help; however, Stingo and Slugsy avoid her not to hit the web she spins. Meanwhile, others consider her "so-called" as she lives in a web house.
- Mo is Fifi's lawn mower, who takes the harvest and the Flowertots around the garden.
- Diggly (Wigglit in the United States) (voiced by Nick Wilson) is a grumpy but amusing worm who lives on the compost heap, eats scraps, (though he prefers pumpkin pies), and gets more irritated than Primrose and Buttercup.
- Hornetto (voiced by Tim Whitnall) is an Italian-accented hornet who is Stingo's cousin.

== Development ==
Fifi was the first series put into development at the startup business Chapman Productions, formed by Bob the Builder creator Keith Chapman. Production on the series was announced in June 2001 when Chapman entered into a first-look development deal with Vision Video Ltd., a division of Universal Pictures Home Video, to develop the series with Universal Pictures handling worldwide distribution. While the name, series, and concept were not put into place at the time, the series was said to be more centric towards a female audience than Bob the Builder. The deal between Vision Video and Chapman fell through in 2003 due to financial issues at Universal's parent company Vivendi Universal. As a result, Chapman went on their own with the production of the series.

The series was officially announced as Fifi and the Flowertots on 18 March 2004, being greenlit by broadcasters Five and Nick Jr., and would simultaneously premiere on both channels in Spring 2005. Chapman entered into a distribution agreement with Target Entertainment in September, allowing them to distribute the series globally except in North America and the United Kingdom.

The series' global launch occurred on Five's children's programming block Milkshake! on 2 May 2005, and soon premiered on Nick Jr. at the end of the month. With the success of the series, Five and Nickelodeon UK commissioned a second series on 31 March 2006, split into a delivery of thirteen episodes which would air shortly after the initial announcement and the rest to air during the summer until the Spring of 2007.

On 1 October 2008, Five and Nickelodeon UK recommissioned Fifi for a third series. Series 3 would be produced at Chapman's animation studio in Altrincham, Cheshire, which had opened earlier in the year to produce the second series of Roary the Racing Car.

== Episodes ==
=== Series overview ===
Series	Episodes	Originally released	
Series	Episodes	First released	Last released
1	52	2 May 2005	12 July 2005
2	52	1 May 2006	11 July 2006
3	13	20 June 2010	5 July 2010

=== Series 1 (2005) ===
No. overall	No. in series	Title	Written by	Original release date
1	1	"Fifi's Talent Show"	Wayne Jackman	2 May 2005
Everyone enters a talent contest, but Fifi gets so distracted helping everyone else that she has no time to get ready herself.
2	2	"Flowertots Fallout"	Rachel Dawson	3 May 2005
Fifi unfairly tells Bumble/Fuzzbuzz off for messing up her flowers by sneezing, and Primrose unfairly berates Violet for her ruined dress while painting the picture. Fifi and Primrose become bored, so Fifi decides to make strawberry tarts and apologise for her mistake.
3	3	"Bumble Catches a Cold" "Fuzzbuzz Catches a Cold" (United States)	Gillian Corderoy	4 May 2005
Bumble/Fuzzbuzz has caught a cold, so the Flowertots have a picnic at home.
4	4	"Smelly Slugsy"	Diane Redmond	5 May 2005
Primrose is invited over for a meal by Slugsy, but his odour dissuades her from attending. Luckily, Bumble/Fuzzbuzz has an idea by touching the flower petals.
5	5	"Bumble Gets a Makeover" "Fuzzbuzz Gets a Makeover" (United States)	Gillian Corderoy	6 May 2005
Fifi helps Bumble/Fuzzbuzz to paint his house. Primrose thinks that it's not good enough and asks him to use decorations for beauty. But when everything goes wrong and a ribbon gets stuck into a honey tap, she decides to remove all the decorations and realises that beauty is not always important: the main thing is that everything works very well.
6	6	"Bumble Helps Out" "Fuzzbuzz Helps Out" (United States)	Dave Ingham	9 May 2005
Fifi is so busy transferring her flowers from the ground to the pots that she forgets about the tea party she was supposed to throw. Bumble/Fuzzbuzz decides to help out, but gets stuck in a compost heap and calls Fifi for help.
7	7	"Stingo Gets Stuck"	Gillian Corderoy	10 May 2005
Stingo attempts to help Webby, whose web has become filthy and made everything come unstuck.
8	8	"Flowertots Go Nuts"	Wayne Jackman	11 May 2005
When strange objects appear in the garden after a storm, the tots ask Webby what they are and she explains that they are nuts and they can use them to make soap. This idea comes in very handy because all the soap has been sold in Poppy's/Poppady's market stall. The Flowertots make soap and Primrose washes the dirt out of her dress.
9	9	"Bumble's Big Race" "Fuzzbuzz's Big Race" (United States)	Wayne Jackman	12 May 2005
Stingo challenges Bumble/Fuzzbuzz to a race and decides to win no matter what, while Bumble/Fuzzbuzz is worried about winning.
10	10	"Blueberry Surprise"	Gillian Corderoy	13 May 2005
Fifi and Bumble/Fuzzbuzz offer to help out when Primrose and Violet's garden becomes overrun with fallen blueberries. Afterwards, they decide to make blueberry juice but they decide to do it the next day as they are already too tired.
11	11	"Picture Perfect"	Rachel Dawson	16 May 2005
The Flowertots draw pictures, but because all of them are so good, Primrose can't choose a winner. But she makes a prize for Stingo: a set of paints, much to Stingo’s disappointment that the prize wasn’t a cake.
12	12	"Violet's Party"	Diane Redmond	17 May 2005
When Fifi's invitation to Violet's party fails to arrive, she assumes that she has fallen out of favour. However, Primrose moves away from Slugsy's slide. Meanwhile, Violet finally invites Fifi (and explains what she has made: jelly; ice cream, cucumber sandwiches and birthday cake).
13	13	"Leave it to Stingo"	Dave Ingham	18 May 2005
The garden has become messy after a windy night, so Stingo promises to clean Fifi's garden and fix Violet and Primrose's chimney and Bumble's/Fuzzbuzz's gate. Everyone presents him with cake, pie and honey, but when he eats them, he forgets his promise. Though, as a punishment, he and Slugsy are asked to do all these chores.
14	14	"Mud Spies"	Rachel Dawson	19 May 2005
The garden is muddy after a spot of rain. Fifi and Bumble/Fuzzbuzz make mud pies and Stingo thinks that they are chocolate, but when he tries them, he finds out that they are inedible.
15	15	"Treasure Hunt"	Wayne Jackman	20 May 2005
Fifi is disappointed after losing a brooch Violet has made for her. Slugsy finds it, returns it and becomes a real hero. At Bumble's/Fuzzbuzz's party, Violet is glad to see the brooch again.
16	16	"Sports Day"	Rachel Dawson	23 May 2005
On a summer sports day, Stingo does his best to win every event possible. However, his efforts fail at every turn, so Slugsy helps Primrose get back and win the competition.
17	17	"Fee-Fi-Fo-Fum, Fifi"	Diane Redmond	24 May 2005
When giant footprints appear in the garden, Fifi tells Pip the story of Jack and the Beanstalk.
18	18	"Life's a Beach"	Rachel Dawson	25 May 2005
On a hot summer day, the Flowertots decide to transform the garden into a beach.
19	19	"Fifi's in Charge"	Diane Redmond	26 May 2005
Poppy/Poppady asks Pip to look after her market stall and make some deliveries, but Pip accidentally delivers the wrong thing to Primrose.
20	20	"Hole Lot of Fun"	Wayne Jackman	27 May 2005
Fifi and Bumble/Fuzzbuzz gather peas. Stingo is bored and wants something exciting to do, so he goes to them and strikes peas into a hole. Bumble/Fuzzbuzz asks Violet to make medals. When the competition starts, Webby keeps score and Stingo wins because he has always been able to get the peas into the hole. In the end, everyone eats Aunt Tulip's oat biscuits.
21	21	"Knitting Nonsense"	Gillian Corderoy	30 May 2005
Webby has a lot of interesting things and decides to throw them out because she doesn't have enough space to keep them. Fifi and the Flowertots deliver them to their friends, but Primrose's knitting gets tied to Mo. Fifi goes to see Webby and doesn't know whose it is. She then knits a bag for Primrose and a scarf for Mo, and everyone thanks her.
22	22	"Spotty Pip"	Wayne Jackman	31 May 2005
Stingo tries to convince Pip that he has Flowertot spots. He paints red spots on Pip's face with strawberry juice and tells him that the only way he can get better is by eating a lot of sweets/candies. Stingo's idea has no effect on Pip. In the end, Fifi and her friends are able to teach Stingo a lesson.
23	23	"Don't Go Changing!"	Rachel Dawson	1 June 2005
The Flowertots wish they could be more like someone else, but Webby convinces them that they are perfect just as they are.
24	24	"The Wasp That Cried Ouch"	Rachel Dawson	2 June 2005
The Flowertots are worried when Bumble/Fuzzbuzz gets injured. Afterwards, they suddenly hear Stingo's cries. He says that his whole body is in pain. Primrose puts a bandage on him and the Flowertots bring him tasty things. While they do this, they say that he has lied to them. Meanwhile, when they play golf again, they hear cries again and think that Stingo is faking sick again. But when they come to him they see that he has eaten too much and he really is ill.
25	25	"Primrose's Perfume Song" "Primrose's Perfume Scent" (United States)	Gillian Corderoy	3 June 2005
Fifi and Bumble/Fuzzbuzz set about concocting a new perfume for Primrose, but Bumble/Fuzzbuzz confuses the perfume mixture with the contents of the compost bucket. Meanwhile he throws it out and adds flowers instead. Finally, they make a good perfume for Primrose.
26	26	"Chocolate Surprise"	Diane Redmond	6 June 2005
Fifi is baking a chocolate cake for the garden party, but is out of eggs. When she goes out to buy some more, Stingo tastes the filling, but spills it in the process. Luckily, when Fifi returns, it hardens. Later on, everyone enjoys Fifi's cake, but Stingo refuses to try it, saying that he hates chocolate.
27	27	"Pip Learns to Dance"	Rachel Dawson	7 June 2005
Pip wants to learn to dance well for the upcoming disco. However, Fifi asks "who is going to show him all the best moves".
28	28	"Fizzy Business"	Dave Ingham	8 June 2005
On a hot summer day, Fifi and Bumble/Fuzzbuzz make lemonade, but when Fifi goes to find some bottles, it disappears. Meanwhile, they do not seem to know where has gone, but when they give it out for everybody to drink, they see Stingo and Slugsy hiccupping, and find out that they have drunk all of it.
29	29	"The Belle of the Ball"	Diane Redmond	9 June 2005
Everyone is getting ready for an annual summer ball, but Fifi is so busy helping everybody else with their outfits that she even doesn't know which outfit to wear. She collects flower petals and makes a ballgown of them. Later on, Pip gets a medal at the ball, but he gives it to Fifi for helping him to get ready. Stingo and Slugsy eat lots of sweets and leave the ball.
30	30	"Flying Lessons"	Rachel Dawson	10 June 2005
Stingo gets irritated with Slugsy for being so slow all the time, so Slugsy asks the other Flowertots to help him get airborne.
31	31	"Fifi's Big Crunch Day"	Diane Redmond	13 June 2005
The Flowertots have grown their own fruit and vegetables to eat on Big Crunch Day to keep their teeth healthy, but Bumble/Fuzzbuzz discovers that his peas have gone mushy. Meanwhile, Stingo and Slugsy have grown a large apple, but they eat Poppy's/Poppady's sweets/candies instead and get toothache.
32	32	"Fifi's Scarecrow"	Diane Redmond	14 June 2005
Fifi tries to build a scarecrow to scare away the butterflies that keep eating her vegetables. But when it fails to scare them off and Grubby gets frightened of Primrose, she steps in and exchanges Primrose's clothes and the scarecrow's clothes. The butterflies get frightened and fly out of the garden. Finally, Fifi shows the Flowertots what she has grown and sings them a song.
33	33	"Soup of the Day"	Gillian Corderoy	15 June 2005
On a cold day, the Flowertots make vegetable soup. Primrose asks to bring the required ingredients, but everyone is out of peas. When she boils her peas in the pan and forgets about her soup, it suddenly burns. The Flowertots boil it again, since they already have the vegetables they need, and invite everyone to eat it.
34	34	"Fiddlesticks Fifi"	Diane Redmond	16 June 2005
Fifi is concerned when Bumble/Fuzzbuzz does not return after going to look for a spade, but the Flowertots soon hear some peculiar noises. Fifi tells everybody that it's nonsense but then recognises the noise: Bumble/Fuzzbuzz is lost in the bushes. Meanwhile, Aunt Tulip gives him a hot drink with honey and cinnamon and he starts feeling better. Fifi promises to listen to everything very carefully without saying "fiddlesticks".
35	35	"Fifi's Good Turn"	Dave Ingham	17 June 2005
Aunt Tulip is giving out a prize for the best garden. Stingo and Slugsy pretend that they are in great pain, so Fifi has to clean their garden. However, when she does it, Stingo and Slugsy get a prize for cleaning Fifi's garden and they have to do it in the end.
36	36	"Forget Me Tot"	Wayne Jackman	20 June 2005
Fifi is hanging out her washing when she discovers she has run out of clothes pegs. She goes to Poppy's/Poppady's market, and Poppy/Poppady reminds Fifi that she has promised to help her wash the potatoes. Suddenly, she remembers that she had promised to help Violet, Primrose, Pip and Bumble/Fuzzbuzz. Meanwhile, Fifi lends Webby a helping hand. When Fifi helps everyone, they thank her for helping. Then she goes to Stingo and gives him a chocolate-covered strawberry for "Wasps Love Day". Slugsy goes to Poppy's/Poppady's market to buy some honey.
37	37	"Fancy Free Fifi"	Diane Redmond	21 June 2005
Bumble/Fuzzbuzz and Violet persuade Fifi to take a day off from all her gardening, assuring her that they can look after it for her. However, they weren't able to do all the jobs: beetles munched through Fifi's potatoes.
38	38	"Stingo's Shopping Spree"	Chris Bowden	22 June 2005
Stingo and Slugsy are being unusually helpful, offering to do everybody's shopping for them.
39	39	"Fifi Follows the Clues"	Rachel Dawson	23 June 2005
Fifi has baked some pies, but when she and Bumble/Fuzzbuzz go to find blueberries to make juice, Stingo and Slugsy steal a carrot cake, a blueberry pie and honey flat cakes. When Fifi, Bumble/Fuzzbuzz and Primrose find that they have disappeared, they have to find them through the use of clues so they don't have to cancel the party. Primrose follows the honey footprints to find the thief.
40	40	"Big Band Night"	Wayne Jackman	24 June 2005
On the day of the Flowertot concert, Fifi gets a sore throat and Bumble/Fuzzbuzz loses his drum kit, almost forcing the show to be cancelled if Bumble/Fuzzbuzz can't find the drums and Fifi can't cure her throat with his honey, which has also mysteriously disappeared.
41	41	"Daisy Chain Dance"	Diane Redmond	27 June 2005
The tots hope to hold their annual daisy chain dance in the garden, but it the garden is muddy.
42	42	"Fun at the Fair"	Rachel Dawson	28 June 2005
The tots decide to hold a funfair, and everyone does their best to make it a memorable day.
43	43	"Flowertot Babysitter"	Diane Redmond	29 June 2005
Fifi is excited to be looking after Aunt Tulip's pet, Grubby, for the day. However, disaster strikes when Grubby disappears, and Mo keeps breaking down.
44	44	"Singalong Song"	Wayne Jackman	30 June 2005
When everyone is enchanted by mysterious singing in Flowertot Garden, they set out to find where the music is coming from.
45	45	"Pip the Gardener"	Gillian Corderoy	1 July 2005
Pip wants to be a gardener just like Fifi but doesn't realise how much hard work it is. Fifi and Bumble/Fuzzbuzz help Pip grow his very own crop of cress. In the end, Fifi says that "Pip is sharing it with the other tots".
46	46	"Slugsy's Rescue"	Dave Ingham	4 July 2005
Stingo spies a ripe apple growing on the apple tree. He is determined to get it down for himself before the tots see it, but Slugsy gets stuck up the tree in the process.
47	47	"Milkshake"	Diane Redmond	5 July 2005
Pip is very proud of the wild strawberries he has grown for Fifi's picnic. Unfortunately he squashes them in his rush to get to Fifi's house. Fifi says she "is able to save the day".
48	48	"Flowertot Rainbow"	Diane Redmond	6 July 2005
To thank Violet for a lovely painting, Fifi promises her a special surprise, but her plan to wow Violet with a colourful display goes awry when she forgets to water her flowers.
49	49	"Frosty Morning"	Wayne Jackman	7 July 2005
Fifi's pipes have frozen in cold weather and Stingo offers to help out. Later on, Bumble/Fuzzbuzz says that "Stingo knows what he is doing", adding that he "is really doing it out of the goodness of his own heart".
50	50	"Poppy's Day Off" "Poppady's Day Off" (United States)	Rachel Dawson	8 July 2005
Poppy/Poppady is feeling overworked at the stall and she is relieved when Webby offers to take over so she can have a day off. However, Poppy/Poppady is soon at a loss with so much free time.
51	51	"Can We Have Our Ball Back?"	Dave Ingham	11 July 2005
Pip happily agrees to a football match against Stingo and Slugsy. However, Bumble/Fuzzbuzz is terrified, as he is not very good at football.
52	52	"Violet's Big Bracelet"	Gillian Corderoy	12 July 2005
Fifi is sure she's supposed to be going somewhere important and says she doesn't know where it is. Only when she's making friendship bracelets does she remember.

=== Series 2 (2006) ===
No. overall	No. in series	Title	Written by	Original release date
53	1	"Compost Chaos"	Gillian Corderoy	1 May 2006
When Primrose can't make her garden grow, she turns to Fifi for advice. She is amazed when Fifi points out that you need to water and weed a garden. However this doesn't mean she is putting compost everywhere.
54	2	"Bumble's Afraid of the Dark" "Fuzzbuzz's Afraid of the Dark" (United States)	Rachel Dawson	2 May 2006
Primrose and Violet have a sleepover, and try to help Bumble/Fuzzbuzz battle his fear of the dark.
55	3	"Count on Fifi"	Wayne Jackman	3 May 2006
Fifi and Bumble/Fuzzbuzz deliver lots of delicious honey to Poppy's/Poppady's stall, but lose a pot on the way.
56	4	"Poppy the Line Dancing Queen" "Poppady the Line Dancing Queen" (United States)	Diane Redmond	4 May 2006
Poppy/Poppady is having a line-dancing party, but none of the other Flowertots know how to line-dance. Fifi has two options: either any of them are able to learn in time, or Poppy/Poppady has to cancel the party; she selects one of them.
57	5	"King Stingo"	Dave Ingham	5 May 2006
Aunt Tulip has lost Grubby again. When Stingo finds him, he asks to be made King as a reward, but it isn't long before he goes too far and the tots are all fed up with his demands.
58	6	"Hide and Seek"	Debbie Peers	8 May 2006
Fifi goes hiding and Pip has to seek.
59	7	"My Friend Fifi"	Dave Ingham	9 May 2006
Fifi and Bumble/Fuzzbuzz fall out in a big way after Fifi doesn't show up to the picnic they are supposed to have together, so Stingo tries to get them to be friends again.
60	8	"Diggly's Big Adventure" "Wigglit's Big Adventure" (United States)	Dave Ingham	10 May 2006
Fifi gives Diggly/Wigglit a guided tour of the garden after he complains he is bored of the compost heap, but he gets lost.
61	9	"Pip's Playground"	Diane Redmond	11 May 2006
Pip is feeling bored and wants something new to play with, so Fifi asks all the tots to help her build a playground for Pip as a surprise.
62	10	"Mud Sculptures"	Wayne Jackman	12 May 2006
Set after the events of the series 1 episode "Mud Spies", the story sees the tots as they decide to make mud sculptures. However, Fifi asks them "what will they all do with the sculptures when they are finished".
63	11	"Stingo's Naughty Day"	Chris Bowden	15 May 2006
Stingo is bored and plays naughty tricks on the other tots. Fifi teaches Stingo that he is able to have more fun if he helps people rather than being mean to them.
64	12	"Shrinking Pip"	Rachel Dawson	16 May 2006
Pip says he hasn't grown much since he was last measured. Fifi learns how can he grow into a big strong gooseberry.
65	13	"Bumble's Special Lunch" "Fuzzbuzz's Special Lunch" (United States)	Wayne Jackman	17 May 2006
Fifi invites the other Tots over to lunch. However, she isn't feeling well. Meanwhile, Bumble/Fuzzbuzz gamely steps in and offers to cook for her.
66	14	"Fifi Miss Me Not"	Rachel Dawson	18 May 2006
Bumble/Fuzzbuzz goes off on a pollen-collecting expedition, and wishes Fifi was with him. Meanwhile, back in the garden, Fifi misses her best friend and sets out on a quest to find him.
67	15	"Pirate Primrose"	Gillian Corderoy	19 May 2006
The tots play pirates, except for Primrose, who prefers to be a princess.
68	16	"Primrose Loses It"	Wayne Jackman	22 May 2006
Primrose is inconsolable after breaking her new necklace and losing the beads, so Violet holds a make-and-do party to replace the necklace.
69	17	"Doctor Webby"	Wayne Jackman	23 May 2006
Bumble's/Fuzzbuzz's sneezing is keeping everyone awake at night, so it's up to Fifi and the tots to recover him from this health issue.
70	18	"Make Room for Fifi"	Wayne Jackman	24 May 2006
Fifi's garden smells horrible, so Fifi goes to stay with Primrose and Violet until they can work out where the smell is coming from.
71	19	"Slugsy's Song"	Gillian Corderoy	25 May 2006
Slugsy finds something special, but only Primrose can be persuaded to go and see it with him. Primrose is even excited at them for what she sees, which is a stage number from Slugsy.
72	20	"Stingo's Bridge"	Diane Redmond	26 May 2006
A troll takes up residence under the bridge in the garden and demands food payment every time the tots cross, so Fifi must figure out a way to get rid of him.
73	21	"Violet's Flower Festival"	Diane Redmond	29 May 2006
Violet organises a flower festival, but because she is so busy helping the other tots with their flower displays, she has neglected her own.
74	22	"Pumpkin Pie for Diggly" "Pumpkin Pie for Wigglit" (United States)	Gillian Corderoy	30 May 2006
Diggly/Wigglit is bored of eating the same old scraps every day, so Fifi and Bumble/Fuzzbuzz decide to make him a pumpkin pie as a surprise.
75	23	"Rockabye Stingo"	Gillian Corderoy	31 May 2006
Fifi has lost Cottonsocks, her beloved toy rabbit, so she searches the garden for it to no avail. Eventually, she manages to find it.
76	24	"Inspector Stingo"	Dave Ingham	1 June 2006
Fifi's trowel goes missing and Stingo decides to launch an investigation to find the culprit.
77	25	"Fifi's Busy Day"	Wayne Jackman	2 June 2006
Fifi has been so busy helping everyone that she hasn't had time to tidy her garden. Meanwhile, Bumble/Fuzzbuzz asks the other Tots to help him tidy it as Fifi's surprise.
78	26	"Dingaling Poppy" "Dingaling Poppady" (United States)	Diane Redmond	5 June 2006
Poppy/Poppady gets a new tricycle to do her deliveries on, but does not know how to ride it properly and keeps crashing into things. The tots help Poppy/Poppady learn to ride it safely.
79	27	"Fifi's Film Show"	Dave Ingham	6 June 2006
Fifi decides to film an average day in the Flowertot Garden. However, everyone soon starts acting strangely when the camera appears.
80	28	"Pip and the Genie"	Wayne Jackman	7 June 2006
Stingo tricks Pip into believing he has a magic lamp, and tells Pip he will give him the lamp if he helps with some chores.
81	29	"Runaway Mo"	Wayne Jackman	8 June 2006
Stingo takes Mo for a spin without Fifi's permission. Meanwhile, the tots must step in when the runaway mower goes out of control.
82	30	"Stingo's Enormous Carrot"	Rachel Dawson	9 June 2006
Pip tries to grow vegetables. However, no matter how hard he tries, they don't seem to get any bigger. However, Stingo's vegetable patch next door appears to be doing suspiciously well.
83	31	"Fifi's Pancake Fun"	Rachel Dawson	12 June 2006
Fifi and Pip make pancakes; however, every time they flip one, it disappears.
84	32	"Pip's Pony"	Diane Redmond	13 June 2006
Pip wants a pony. He tries adapting his scooter, and Violet even makes him a hobby horse, but nothing is quite right until Fifi points out the silver horse made out of stars in the night sky.
85	33	"Aunt Tulip's Carnival"	Wayne Jackman	14 June 2006
Everyone is excited for a Caribbean-themed carnival that Aunt Tulip is planning.
86	34	"Storm"	Diane Redmond	15 June 2006
On a windy day, Fifi's washing blows away. Meanwhile, Poppy/Poppady offers to find it and gets caught in the storm.
87	35	"Just One Hornetto"	Dave Ingham	16 June 2006
Stingo's cousin Hornetto pays a visit to the garden and quickly charms everyone. Meanwhile, Stingo and Slugsy are jealous, and decide that he mustn't become a permanent resident.
88	36	"Wasps"	Wayne Jackman	19 June 2006
Stingo is feeling down, so the tots decide to organise a special 'wasp' surprise for him.
89	37	"Slugsy Won't Slide"	Gillian Corderoy	20 June 2006
Slugsy puts too much slime on his slide and gets scared that he will slip off.
90	38	"The Flowertot Taxi"	Dave Ingham	21 June 2006
Stingo is sure that he's onto a good thing when he decides to set up a taxi service using slug power. However, Slugsy is soon exhausted and unable to keep up with demand.
91	39	"Fifi's Happy Day"	Diane Redmond	22 June 2006
Primrose decides to hold a party for Fifi. Everyone helps to plan the party and even Stingo and Slugsy are in charge of making the cake.
92	40	"Fly High Primrose"	Rachel Dawson	23 June 2006
Fifi, Bumble/Fuzzbuzz and Violet try to pick blackberries before the wind blows them to the ground.
93	41	"Lovelorn Slugsy"	Rachel Dawson	26 June 2006
Slugsy is having trouble courting Primrose, so his cousin Hornetto offers to help out.
94	42	"Fifi's Snowy Fun"	Rachel Dawson	27 June 2006
On a snowy day in Flowertot Garden, everyone has fun except Primrose, who is worried she'll get dirty.
95	43	"Mystery in Flowertot Garden"	Dave Ingham	28 June 2006
When someone has been going through the bins in Flowertot Garden, the tots turn detective to see if they can unearth the culprit.
96	44	"Stingo Cleans Up"	Wayne Jackman	29 June 2006
Diggly/Wigglit is exasperated with the heap of unwanted items next to his compost heap. Meanwhile, in order to clean up, Stingo decides to "resell" his belongings.
97	45	"My Fair Bumble" "My Fair Fuzzbuzz" (United States)	Dave Ingham	30 June 2006
Bumble/Fuzzbuzz is invited to Aunt Tulip's for tea, but he's worried that his manners are not up to scratch. Now, the other tots try to help him out.
98	46	"Pineapple Palace Panic"	Diane Redmond	3 July 2006
Fifi is supposed to be babysitting Grubby, but she has forgotten; now Stingo and Slugsy step in to cover for her, with disastrous results.
99	47	"Poppy's Great Race" "Poppady's Great Race" (United States)	Gillian Corderoy	4 July 2006
The annual Flowertot Race begins. However, Poppy/Poppady is reluctant to enter, as she always loses her way, so Fifi and Bumble/Fuzzbuzz try to help.
100	48	"Big Blueberry Hunt"	Gillian Corderoy	5 July 2006
Fifi and Bumble/Fuzzbuzz go to pick blueberries, only to discover that they have all vanished.
101	49	"Pip and the Wizard"	Wayne Jackman	6 July 2006
Stingo and Slugsy put on a magic show.
102	50	"Snowtime for Pip"	Dave Ingham	7 July 2006
All Pip wants to do is play in the snow, but there is a problem.
103	51	"Grubby Ahoy"	Gillian Corderoy	10 July 2006
When Stingo and Slugsy try to steal a picnic, they accidentally untie Aunt Tulip's boat. The boat floats away down the river with Grubby stuck on it.
104	52	"Stingo Has Visitors"	Wayne Jackman	11 July 2006
Stingo's treehouse has been invaded by ants and Fifi is determined to get rid of them. However, she doesn't want Stingo and Slugsy staying with her a moment longer than necessary.

=== Series 3 (2010) ===
No. overall	No. in series	Title	Written by	Original release date
105	1	"Flowertot Fairies"	Wayne Jackman	20 June 2010
The twins spot what they think is a fairy at the end of the garden.
106	2	"Dandelions"	Rachel Dawson	21 June 2010
The twins inadvertently ruin Fifi's garden while playing a game.
107	3	"Come and Play Slugsy"	Wayne Jackman	22 June 2010
Stingo dispatches Slugsy to steal Fifi's jelly. Slugsy starts to play with the twins and forgets what he set out to do, much to Stingo's wrath.
108	4	"Bumble's Magic" "Fuzzbuzz's Magic" (United States)	Rachel Dawson	23 June 2010
Bumble/Fuzzbuzz practises for his magic show when he accidentally makes the twins disappear. Meanwhile, Fifi finds her friends before the show begins.
109	5	"Naughty Twins"	Wayne Jackman	23 June 2010
Stingo persuades the twins to go around the garden for him collecting food, hoping that the other tots don't realise what he is up to.
110	6	"Fifi's Shadows"	Janet James and Joanna Ruiz	24 June 2010
Fifi helps Webby clear out her web. However, instead of throwing all the unwanted objects away, Fifi decides to take them home and use them for a very special game of shadow puppets.
111	7	"Buttercup Bad Wolf"	Keith Chapman, Diane Redmond and Wayne Jackman	27 June 2010
The twins play "The Three Little Pigs" and Buttercup enjoys her role as the Big Bad Wolf so much that she scares Daisy. Meanwhile, Buttercup realises just how upset her sister is.
112	8	"When the Sky Cried"	Wayne Jackman	28 June 2010
Buttercup and Daisy decide that it only rains when the sky is upset, so they set about trying to cheer the sky up.
113	9	"Violet's Song"	Martin Pullen	29 June 2010
Primrose composes a song for Violet, but is disappointed when the twins break her guitar. The twins hope to come up with an answer to help her perform for Violet.
114	10	"Poppy's Ice-Cream Show" "Poppady's Ice-Cream Show" (United States)	Keith Chapman, Diane Redmond and Wayne Jackman	30 June 2010
Poppy/Poppady is having an ice cream party and has invited all the Flowertots to come with their favourite fruits to make lots of different ice cream flavours. However, Stingo and Slugsy don't want to bring any fruit so they offer to put on a thrilling show in return for as much ice cream they can eat.
115	11	"Painting Practice"	Gillian Corderoy	1 July 2010
Fifi wants to repaint her kitchen, but Poppy/Poppady has run out of paint. Everyone hopes to find a different way to brighten up her walls.
116	12	"Hide and Squeak"	Rachel Dawson	3 July 2010
Buttercup and Daisy play hide and seek with Pip, but they all argue over who is the best at hiding.
117	13	"Twinkle Twinkle"	Gillian Corderoy	5 July 2010
Buttercup and Daisy find some stars in Flowertot Garden. They think they have fallen out of the sky, so it's up to Fifi and the tots to return them.

== Licensing and overseas broadcast ==
In June 2004, Chapman signed Vivid Imaginations as the master toy partner for the series. In August, as part of Chapman's distribution agreement with Target Entertainment, the company was also appointed worldwide consumer product rights and merchandising sales outside North America. In October, HarperCollins and BBC Worldwide signed UK deals to release books and magazines based on the series. In April 2005, it was announced that 2 Entertain had acquired British home video rights.

By June 2006, Target had signed over 34 merchandising deals in the United Kingdom for the series, alongside the master toy, publishing and home video deals done by Chapman.

In June 2007, HIT Entertainment picked up distribution rights to the series for North America and Japan. The show aired on Sprout from 2008-2012.

In September 2008, Chapman expanded their partnership with HIT Entertainment to include global live event and attraction format rights.

The deal between Target and Chapman for licensing rights ended at the end of April 2009, allowing Chapman to fully market the property in-house while Target would remain as distributor.
