= Little Charley Bear =

British television series

- Genre: Children's
- Created by: Daniel Pickering
- Directed by: Mark Woollard (episodes 52 / seasons 1-4)
- Narrated by: James Corden
- Opening theme: "You Gotta Love That Bear!", sung by Chris Madin
- Country of origin: United Kingdom
- Original language: English
- No. of series: 4 x 13
- No. of episodes: 52

Production
- Running time: 7 minutes
- Production companies: Chapman Entertainment; Annix Studios

Original release
- Network: CBeebies
- Release: 10 January 2011 – 20 May 2015

Little Charley Bear is a British CGI-animated television series created by Daniel Pickering. Narrated by James Corden, Little Charley Bear takes viewers on a journey into the world of let's pretend, where anything is possible. Little Charley Bear made its television debut in January 2011 on CBeebies. The show has been sold into more than 80 territories.

In 2012, a one off stage version was made, Little Charley Bear and His Christmas Adventure written and directed by Brian Herring.

In 2013, DreamWorks Animation bought the rights to Chapman Entertainment's library and children's shows.

In 2020, Little Charley Bear's official YouTube channel was launched with all 52 episodes available.

== Characters ==
All characters appear as toys in the series, and they are silent instead of being voiced by actors.

- Little Charley Bear – the titular character, a stuffed toy bear.
- Caramel – A wooden pop-up cow.
- Nibblit – A stuffed toy rabbit.
- Midge – A smaller stuffed toy bear.
- Bellarina – A ballerina peg wooden doll.
- Frozo – A squeaky toy penguin.
- Rivet – A toy robot with large green shoes.

== Toyline ==
A toyline produced by Vivid Imaginations was released in late 2011.
