= Curtis Jobling =

British writer and illustrator (born 1972)

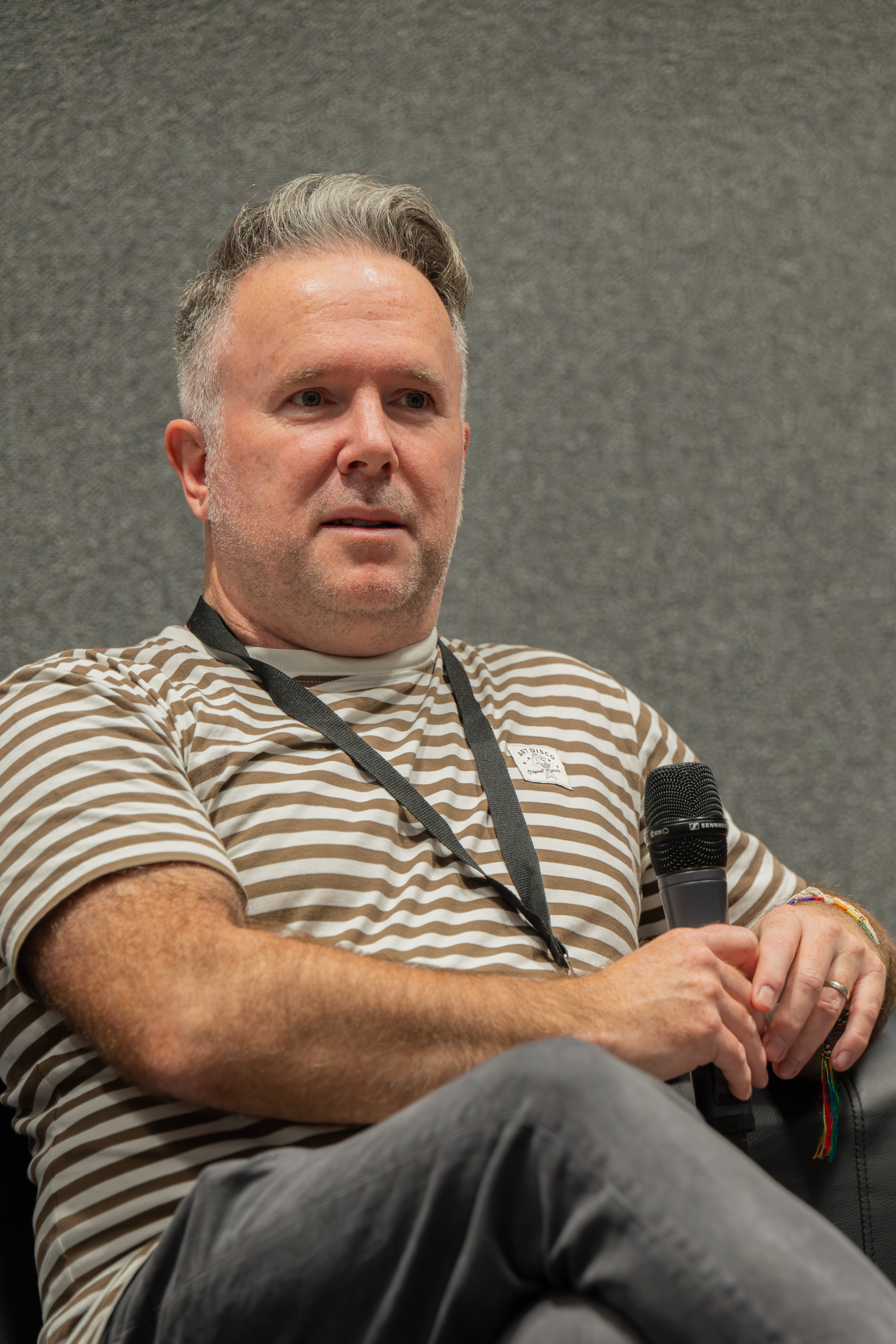
- At MCM London Comic Con, 25 October 2025
- Born: Blackpool, Lancashire, England
- Occupations: Animator, illustrator, writer
- Writing career
- Notable works: Bob the Builder, Frankenstein's Cat and Wereworld
- Website: www.curtisjobling.com

Curtis Jobling is a British artist and writer, born in Blackpool, England but lives in Warrington.

Jobling was the production designer of the stop-motion episodes of the children's TV hit Bob the Builder, where he visualised all of that programme's characters, props and sets. He is also an author and illustrator of children's books, including Frankenstein's Cat, a tale about a muddled-up feline. The book was adapted into an animated series, the first of which was aired on CBBC and BBC One in the UK.

Jobling's pre-school show Raa Raa the Noisy Lion, about a noisy lion cub and his friends, was produced by Chapman Entertainment and McKinnon and Saunders, and first aired on the BBC's CBeebies channel in Spring 2011. Narrated by Lorraine Kelly, the show aimed to support pre-school language development through "reading rhyming and repetition".

In 2010, Jobling signed a two-book deal with Puffin for his young adult series of fantasy horror entitled Wereworld. The first novel, Rise of The Wolf, was released in January 2011 in the UK, and short-listed for the Waterstones Children's Book Prize 2011. The US edition was released in Fall 2011. The second book, Rage of Lions was released Summer 2011, with books 3 & 4 released in 2012, and books 5 & 6 released in the summer and fall of 2013 respectively.

In 2022, Netflix announced that an animated series adaptation of the Wereworld books was in development with Lime Pictures, with Jobling named as part of the production team. Wolf King was released on 20 March 2025.

He is a fan of the rugby team Warrington Wolves (nickname Wire).

Central Characters

Key Protagonists:

- Drew Ferran- The central character, who is a young man navigating the dangerous political and supernatural world of Wereworld. He is often caught between human and werecreature factions, seeking to protect his family and friends.
- Lady Whitley- A noblewoman and political figure, known for her intelligence and strategic mind. She plays a major role in the power struggles of the series.
- Lady Gretchen- A strong, independent woman with a reputation for loyalty and courage, often recognized as a "moral compass" throughout the series.
- Baron Hector- A powerful noble and political leader, balancing alliances between humans and werecreatures.
- Duke Bergan- A werecreature leader with a complex mix of honor and ambition, often clashing with human authorities.
- Magister Willem- A wise and respected leader of the Magister's council, guiding the balance between the factions.

== Bibliography ==
=== Picturebooks ===
- Frankenstein's Cat
- The Skeleton in the Closet (with Alice Schertle) (HarperCollins Children's Books, 2003) ISBN 0-688-17739-5
- My Daddy: My Daddy is the Best in the Universe (HarperCollins, 2005) ISBN 0-00-712255-1
- Cheeky Monkey (Oxford University Press, 2006) ISBN 0-19-272549-1
- Dinosaurs After Dark (with Jonathan Emmett) (HarperCollins Children's Books, 2006) ISBN 0-00-722464-8
- Old Macdonald had a Zoo (Egmont, 2014) ISBN 978-1405267120
- The Sheep Won't Sleep (Egmont, 2015) ISBN 978-1405267113

=== The Wereworld Series ===
- Wereworld: Rise of the Wolf (Puffin, 2011) ISBN 978-0-14-133339-7
- Wereworld: Rage Of Lions (Puffin, 2011) ISBN 978-0-14-133340-3
- Wereworld: Shadow of the Hawk (Puffin, 2012) ISBN 978-0-14-134049-4
- Wereworld: Nest of Serpents (Puffin, 2012) ISBN 978-0-14-134050-0
- Wereworld: Storm of Sharks (Puffin, 2013) ISBN 978-0-14-134500-0
- Wereworld: War of the Werelords (Puffin, 2013) ISBN 978-0-670-78559-9

=== Haunt ===
- Haunt (Simon and Schuster Children's books, 2014) ISBN 978-1471115776
- Haunt 2: Dead Wrong (Simon and Schuster UK, 2014) ISBN 978-1471115790

=== Max Helsing: Monster Hunter Series ===
- Max Helsing and the 13th curse (Viking Books, 2015) ISBN 978-0451474797
- Max Helsing and the Beast of Bone Creek (Viking Books, 2016) ISBN 978-0451474803

=== Other works ===
- A New Hero (World of Warriors book 1) (Puffin, 2015) ISBN 978-0141360027
