= Roary the Racing Car =

British animated children's television show

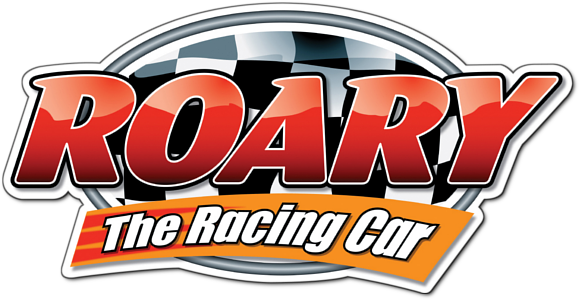
- Genre: Children's television series
- Created by: David Jenkins
- Developed by: Keith Chapman
- Directed by: Tim Harper
- Voices of: Maria Darling; Tim Whitnall; Marc Silk; Dominic Frisby; Peter Kay (UK); Kerry Shale (US)
- Narrated by: Sir Stirling Moss (UK); Sam Hornish Jr. (US)
- Theme music composer: Alan Coates and Kim Goody
- Opening theme: "My Number One Star" sung by Peter Kay (UK)/Kerry Shale (US)
- Country of origin: United Kingdom
- Original language: English
- No. of series: 2
- No. of episodes: 104

Production
- Executive producer: Greg Lynn (Series 2)
- Producer: Owen Ballhatchet (Series 1)
- Running time: 10 minutes (approx.)
- Production company: Chapman Entertainment

Original release
- Network: Five; Nick Jr.
- Release: 7 May 2007 – 29 September 2010

Related
- Fifi and the Flowertots

Roary the Racing Car, stylised as ROARY: The Racing Car, is a British preschool animated television series created by David Jenkins and produced by Chapman Entertainment for Five and Nick Jr. that aired from 7 May 2007 to 29 September 2010. The series was animated by Cosgrove Hall Films for its first series, while Chapman took over animation production for the second series. It follows the adventures of Roary and his racing car friends at Silver Hatch racetrack.

== Overview ==
=== Plot ===
The series follows the lives and adventures of five anthropomorphic racing vehicles, Roary, Maxi, Cici (Zizzy in the US), Drifter (Dragga in the US), Tin Top, and the people who they work for, Big Chris the Mechanic, Marsha the Race Marshall and the owner of the racetrack, Mr. Carburettor.

=== Setting ===
Roary the Racing Car is set around a fictional motor racing circuit called Silver Hatch (a portmanteau of the names of the two British Grand Prix racing circuits, Silverstone and Brands Hatch). The majority of the action takes place at the track's pits and workshop, although we often follow the cars on their laps around the track. Occasionally, the characters venture to external locations such as the nearby beach.

Sometimes, a race will happen, which will take up most of the episode.

=== Narration ===
Every story begins and ends with some brief narration normally from racing car driver Sir Stirling Moss, who is also used as a voiceover. The US version is narrated by American stock car driver Sam Hornish Jr.

== Characters ==
The characters for series 1-2 (from left to right): FB (Trucksy in the US), Zippee, Tin Top, Dinkie, and Mr. Carburettor (behind Tin Top), Hellie, Maxi, Big Chris, Rusty (behind Big Chris), Roary, Marsha, Flash (Furz in the US), Cici (Zizzy in the US), Drifter (Dragga in the US), Plugger (Lugga in the US), and Farmer Green (except Molecom).

=== Vehicles ===
- Roary (voiced by Maria Darling) is a red British-accented Formula Ford car who is the primary protagonist of the show and Silver Hatch's number 1 car. Roary has a rivalry with Maxi, and the two are often at odds. However, they demonstrate that they care deeply for each other and frequently spend time together. Although Roary is young and somewhat inexperienced at racing, he is constantly learning from his friends and fellow racers. He occasionally finds himself in difficult situations, but he always makes amends. Roary is intelligent, friendly to everyone around him, and eager to learn, as well as best friends with Cici and FB.
- Maxi (voiced by Marc Silk) is a yellow Italian-accented Formula One car who is very hot-tempered, loves to show off, and is obsessed with winning. He is Silver Hatch's number 5 car, and is usually very grumpy, stubborn, arrogant and pessimistic, as well as snooty at times, often only thinking about himself and not caring about others. He is sometimes irresponsible and reckless, occasionally doing stunts that are harmful and risky. He is Mr. Carburettor's favorite race car at Silver Hatch, and has a rivalry with Roary when it only comes to certain things, such as when they often argue over who is the best. Maxi occasionally bullies and belittles Roary, but does show that he still cares a lot for him deep down.
- Cici (Zizzy in North America) (voiced by Maria Darling) is a pink and purple French-accented rally car who is very bubbly, playful and friendly and is Silver Hatch's number 3 car. She is Roary's best friend and love interest as she has a massive crush on Roary ever since his first day at Silver Hatch. She is also a hybrid car that runs on oil, solar energy, and electric energy. This alternative energy is a focal part of the episode "Cici Gets Fired Up".
- Drifter (Dragga in North America) (voiced by Marc Silk) is an orange Japanese-accented drift car and Silver Hatch's number 6 car, as well as Tin Top's best friend. He is the most technologically advanced car at Silver Hatch, as he has been shown to digitally project images on occasion. He is known for his serene, reserved personality and rarely gets angry or upset. When he does, it is to a much less extreme degree than the others. Drifter is also the most docile car, rarely disobeying any orders. Before a race, Drifter likes to calm down by practicing his Tai Chi. He has a rocket-powered nitro reserve booster.
- Tin Top (voiced by Peter Kay in the UK and Kerry Shale in the US) is a dark blue Southern-American-accented stock car who is very, though unintentionally, accident-prone and Silver Hatch's number 88 car, as well as Drifter's best friend. He often takes his corners too fast and wide and regularly ends up in either the sand trap, the tyre wall, or the mud, generally in a tangled heap of disconnected parts. Like Maxi, Tin Top can make flames come out of his tailpipes. In the episode "Tin Top Gets Scared", he has a fear of mice. He holds the record for the longest tire mark on the Silver Hatch racetrack. Mr. Carburettor sometimes misremembers his name such as calling him "Tick Tock".
- Plugger (Lugga in North America) (voiced by Tim Whitnall) is an aqua blue West Indian-accented Mitsubishi Triton L200 tow truck, who often comes to the rescue when required. Rescues typically consist of him towing other vehicles out of scraps, such when he pulls Cici out of the mud in the episode "Roary Sees Red". In summary, he is perhaps Silver Hatch's rescue vehicle and tow service.
- Hellie (voiced by Marc Silk) is a red, purple and yellow helicopter who is often used to transport Mr. Carburettor and important visitors to Silver Hatch. Hellie is always on standby in case of an emergency, and he is friendly with the cars as well.
- FB (Trucksy in North America) (voiced by Dominic Frisby) is a green West Country-accented second generation Ford F-Series pickup truck and Farmer Green's main vehicle. He helps out a lot with all sorts of things, such as moving heavy hay bales, hoovering up old rubbish or apples, or giving Dinkie a ride. He also loves to explore the race track with his best friends, Roary and Cici.
- Zippee (vocal effects performed by Maria Darling) is an orange Vespa scooter and Marsha's main vehicle, who, along with Dinkie, is the only character who does not speak (and the only non-speaking vehicle character), instead communicating with various scooter noises, mainly horn sounds.
- Rusty (voiced by Dominic Frisby) is an old caravan that Big Chris lives in. He does not move throughout most of the series, except in the episode "Rusty Takes a Trip", where Roary and his friends give him wheels and take him out on the track.
- Breeze (voiced by Maria Darling) is a turquoise Australian-accented Meyers Manx buggy who lives at the beach and is one of Roary's friends. She is shown to love stunts in the episode "Cici Spectacular", and has what seems to be shells painted below her eyes.
- Nick (voiced by Marc Silk) is a blue and orange Lamborghini Gallardo police car who is the main vehicle of PC Pete. Nick loves his job, but he sometimes hopes that he can race on the track when given the chance.
- James (voiced by Dominic Frisby) is a silver British-accented Aston Martin DB5 convertible and Mama Mia's main vehicle. James is very loyal to Mama Mia and always knows what she wants and when she wants it. He also has fancy gadgets that he likes to show off to his friends at Silver Hatch.
- Loada (voiced by Dominic Frisby) is a dark orange and light green Scottish-accented race car transporter lorry that transports and delivers packages and parcels to Silver Hatch. Loada often tells stories about his adventures on the roads to Roary and the others.
- Conrod (voiced by Craig Lowndes) is a silver and red Australian-accented Team Vodafone liveried Ford Falcon V8 Supercar, and Roary's hero, who lives at Bathurst.

=== Humans ===
- Christopher "Big Chris" (voiced by Peter Kay in the UK and Kerry Shale in the US) is the slightly absent-minded mechanic of Silver Hatch and Big Christine's son. Despite his naivety, he serves as the main authority figure when Mr. Carburettor is not around, and has a fatherly relationship with the cars. He loves to eat pizza and doughnuts, though he is never shown to develop any health problems from them. He seems to sing as a side-hustle as well, when off duty, as seen in episodes like "Stars and Cars" and "Cici Spectacular".
- Marsha (voiced by Maria Darling) is the racing marshal of Silver Hatch and PC Pete's sister. She waves the flag when the race begins, and also is the one who takes calls from her workstation.
- Mr. Antonio Carburettor (voiced by Tim Whitnall) is the flamboyant and short-tempered Italian-accented owner of Silver Hatch and "Mama" Mia's son. He loves singing opera, and can be shown as somewhat vain when it comes to his track.
- Farmer Jeffrey "Jeff" Green (voiced by Tim Whitnall) is a West Country-accented farmer who is very humble and slightly messy. The Silver Hatch racing crew often comes to his farm to buy its products, and he and FB once saved Cici from a mud trap during a storm in the episode "Roary Sees Red".
- Margaret "Mama Mia" Carburettor (voiced by Maria Darling) is Mr. Carburettor's Italian-accented mother. She is very prim and proper, and occasionally, like her son.
- PC Pete (Officer Pete in North America) (voiced by Dominic Frisby) is a police constable who is Marsha's brother. He is shown to be friendly, but is quite a stickler for certain rules. Too much of one it would seem, as portrayed in the episode "Law and Order".
- Big Christine (voiced by Peter Kay in the UK and Kerry Shale in the US) is Big Chris' mother who loves dancing.
- Graeme Murray Walker (voiced by himself) is the world's class commentator. He once had a rivalry with Big Chris, until they became good friends with each other.
- "Copter" Keith (voiced by Marc Silk) is a helicopter mechanic and engineer and a good friend of Big Chris.

=== Animals ===
- Flash (Furz in North America) (voiced by Marc Silk) is an anthropomorphic rabbit who likes to cause trouble on the racetrack, but not in a bad way. He also has a yellow skateboard, which he rides to get around Silver Hatch.
- Molecom (voiced by Dominic Frisby) is an anthropomorphic mole who wears glasses, and is a skilled mechanic and banjo player. He is, however, not a good race marshal, as seen when he and Marsha swap jobs for the day.
- Dinkie (vocal effects performed by Marc Silk) is an old grey donkey who lives on Farmer Green's farm. He is the only major animal character who is not anthropomorphic.

== Production ==
Roary the Racing Car uses a combination of computer-generated imagery and stop motion animation; the latter was initially provided by Cosgrove Hall Films, the producer of Noddy's Toyland Adventures, Engie Benjy (Note: They included in The Official BBC Children in Need Medley music video which is set in Silver Hatch.), Little Robots, Fetch the Vet, the third to sixth series of Postman Pat, Pocoyo, the original 1981 Danger Mouse series, Count Duckula, The Wind in the Willows and many other series, and later by Chapman Entertainment's own in-house studio, along with its sister show Fifi and the Flowertots.

The series was created by David Jenkins, who spent four years working in senior management at Brands Hatch Race Circuit. The idea was conceived while watching the Grand Prix on television with his then 18-month-old son, Tom. It was designed and developed by Keith Chapman, creative director of Chapman Entertainment and the creator of Bob the Builder (both 1999 and the 2015 reboot series), Fifi and the Flowertots, and later, Paw Patrol and Mighty Express, with Greg Lynn as the series' executive producer. When the show came to the U.S., HIT Entertainment handled the distribution rights, along with Fifi and the Flowertots. The theme music was produced by Alan Coates and Kim Goody. For scenes that were too difficult to film in stop motion, Chapman asked Studio Liddel to provide CGI animation. The sets and models were made using photographs of their stop motion models.

== Episodes ==
=== Series overview ===
Season	Episodes	Originally released	
Season	Episodes	First released	Last released
1	52	May 7, 2007	June 9, 2008
2	52	June 1, 2009	September 29, 2010

=== Series 1 (2007–08) ===
Overall	Episode	Title	Written by	Description
01	01	"Roary's First Day"	Rachel Dawson	Roary feels nervous as he waits to take part in a big race and Big Chris reminds him of his first day at Silver Hatch.
02	02	"Roary Slips Up"	Wayne Jackman	Roary feels foolish and very oily when he forgets to clean up a mess before a big race occurs.
03	03	"Big Chris Flags it Up"	Rachel Dawson	When Marsha suddenly comes down with a cold and gets sent home, Big Chris mistakes Marsha's flags for oil rags when he accidentally sends fuel dripping onto the ground instead of into Roary's fuel tank.
04	04	"Express Delivery"	Dave Ingham	Roary fetches a box of six eggs, together with a bottle of milk from the farm for Big Chris, but unfortunately, he ends up breaking the eggs and spilling the milk over and over again.
05	05	"Roary's Day at the Seaside"	Di Redmond	Roary spends a day at the beach with Big Chris, Tin Top, and Plugger.
06	06	"Roary Takes Off"	Wayne Jackman	Big Chris accidentally fills Roary with balloon gas instead of special car gas, and he begins to float away.
07	07	"Cici Takes the Blame" ("Zizzy Takes the Blame" in North America)	Dan Wicksman	Marsha's picnic blanket is badly damaged and she thinks that Cici is to blame.
08	08	"Big Chris' Big Workout"	Chris Parker	Big Chris tries to prove to Marsha that he is in good shape after she rescues Roary before he can after he gets stuck in mud.
09	09	"Flash Flips Out" ("Furz Flips Out" in North America)	Wayne Jackman	Flash causes a problem when Roary and the other cars test out their new turbo chargers.
10	10	"Rusty Remembers"	Wayne Jackman	Rusty the caravan needs Roary to cheer him up, despite Big Chris being repeatedly told by Marsha to find a certificate before an inspector comes to the race track.
11	11	"Easy on the Fuel"	Di Redmond	Roary tries to include Maxi in the big race, even after he runs out of fuel.
12	12	"Communication Breakdown"	Chris Parker	Marsha has to recharge her walkie talkie, since she forgot to yesterday, and Roary has a crash and is overheating at Hare-Pin Bend and Marsha and Zippee the Scooter must find a way to get him back to be fixed when the walkie-talkies are still charging up.
13	13	"Blue Light Job"	Di Redmond	Big Chris tries to fix Drifter's neon light without a repair manual.
14	14	"Make Your Mind Up Roary"	Dan Wicksman	The gang prepare for a special trip, but Roary cannot decide whether the Silver Hatch crew should go to the countryside or the beach.
15	15	"Workshop Roary"	Dave Ingham	Roary and Tin Top offer to run the workshop while Big Chris has a nap. However, it proves to be harder than it looks.
16	16	"Tip Top Tin Top"	Dave Ingham	Tin Top impresses a visiting car designer named Hugo Amarillo.
17	17	"Tunnel Vision"	Chris Parker	Roary helps Maxi get over a fear of the dark after he breaks down in Ton-Up Tunnel.
18	18	"Molecom Makes Music"	Wayne Jackman	Molecom wants to be more musical like Big Chris.
19	19	"Roary Goes Missing"	Wayne Jackman	Roary gets stuck at the beach, but no one knows where he is, not even Marsha.
20	20	"Mama Mia"	Wayne Jackman	Mr. Carburettor learns that his mother, Mama Mia, is coming to visit.
21	21	"Surround Sound"	Dan Wicksman	Big Chris is annoyed when his karaoke machine breaks down just when he needs to rehearse for an important competition.
22	22	"Plugger's on the Case" ("Lugga's on the Case" in North America)	Dan Wicksman	Plugger discovers that he cannot do everything by himself - sometimes he needs his friends to help him.
23	23	"Big Chris Learns to Fly"	Rachel Dawson	Big Chris has problems while flying in Hellie.
24	24	"Musical Mayhem"	Chris Parker	Hellie the Helicopter breaks down and is unable to take Mr. Carburettor to the opera. Roary and friends stage their own opera to cheer him up.
25	25	"Braking Promises" ("Breaking Promises" in North America)	Wayne Jackman	Maxi is angry when Roary is offered his spare tire warmers overnight, so he tries to get Roary into trouble.
26	26	"Secret Treasures"	Di Redmond	Roary, Drifter and Tin Top head to the beach to find some buried treasure, just like pirates.
27	27	"Roary on Thin Ice"	Rachel Dawson	On a cold day at Silver Hatch race track, Roary discovers that a section of track has frozen over, and just before they are supposed to stage a racing car display.
28	28	"Drifter's Last Day" ("Dragga's Last Day" in North America)	Rachel Dawson	Roary and Drifter are racing, and Drifter crashes. When Roary overhears Big Chris and Marsha in the workshop, he begins to worry that Drifter will be sent to the scrapyard.
29	29	"Out of Juice"	Chris Parker	Big Chris takes delivery of special rainwater to make the cars run more smoothly, but Maxi drinks it all and nearly causes a bad accident.
30	30	"Roary's Wake Up Call"	Wayne Jackman	Farmer Green & FB have problems getting up in the mornings, so Roary finds a way to help.
31	31	"Big Chris Says Sorry"	Wayne Jackman	Big Chris thinks that Marsha is cross with him after he accidentally tells Mr. Carburettor that she made a mistake.
32	32	"Maxi's New Engine"	Wayne Jackman	Maxi's engine blows up and needs to be rebuilt, so he has to use a spare tractor engine, much to his horror.
33	33	"Busy Day for Big Chris"	Wayne Jackman	Big Chris struggles to find time to relax, because every time he sits down, someone at Silver Hatch race track wants his help.
34	34	"Tin Top Gets Scared"	Wayne Jackman	Flash the rabbit decides to play a mischievous trick on Tin Top after learning he is afraid of mice.
35	35	"Roary Loses a Friend"	Wayne Jackman	Big Chris accidentally throws away Roary's lucky teddy, and sets out to retrieve it before it reaches the dump.
36	36	"Spooky Forest"	Rachel Dawson	Roary and his friends think that the spooky forest is haunted by a ghost, after Big Chris accidentally gets covered in flour.
37	37	"FB in the Fast Lane" ("Trucksy in the Fast Lane" in North America)	Chris Parker	FB competes against Roary at the racetrack - with disastrous results!
38	38	"Roary Goes Back to School"	Wayne Jackman	Roary is forced back to school to brush up on his safety skills.
39	39	"Rabbit That Yelled Stop"	Rachel Dawson	Flash challenges Roary to take part in a race. However, Flash decides to cheat in order to win.
40	40	"Cici Gets Fired Up" ("Zizzy Gets Fired Up" in North America)	Di Redmond	Silver Hatch Race Track suffers a fuel crisis, and a storm cuts off their communication outside, so everyone relies on solar-powered Cici.
41	41	"Stars 'n' Cars"	Dave Ingham	Big Chris is invited to sing karaoke on television, but Roary and the other cars are worried the fame might get to his head.
42	42	"Crash Test Roary"	Dave Ingham	Roary is nervous about racing after crashing into a tree while racing with Maxi.
43	43	"Roary Sees Red"	Di Redmond	Roary and Cici have an argument and fall out. And while helping Farmer Green and FB with their annual hay harvest, Cici gets stuck in the mud before a storm.
44	44	"Rusty Takes a Trip"	Wayne Jackman	Roary and his friends plan a surprise for Rusty.
45	45	"Roary Cleans Up His Act"	Rachel Dawson	Roary tackles a water shortage at Silver Hatch race track to make sure that he and the gang are ready in time for a tremendously important photo shoot!
46	46	"Green-Eyed Roary"	Chris Parker	Maxi chooses Cici as his training partner, making Roary jealous.
47	47	"Big Chris Forgets"	Chris Bowden	Marsha celebrates her birthday, but Big Chris forgets all about the occasion.
48	48	"Big Chris Babysits"	Wayne Jackman	Big Chris looks after Roary and Cici while the others go to a car show, but it seems that he is the one who needs babysitting!
49	49	"Roary and Nigel"	Dave Ingham	Roary makes friends with Nigel the crab, who lives in a rock pool on the beach.
50	50	"Roary Gets it Wrong"	Di Redmond	Farmer Green asks Roary to deliver parcels around the track, but in spite of his singing that he does while driving around the track, Roary gets the parcels all mixed up.
51	51	"Computer Calamity"	Chris Bowden	Mr. Carburettor announces he wants to move with the times and be more modern. But Big Chris, fed up with Mr. Carburettor's irrationality and nonsense, decides to quit his job, leaving Roary and everyone else shocked, broken-hearted and highly depressed, and also fed up with Mr. Carburettor.
52	52	"Roary Digs Deep"	Tim Harper	Roary faces his demons when he races against Maxi.

=== Series 2 (2009–10) ===
Overall	Episode	Title	Written by	Description
53	01	"Cici Spectacular" ("Zizzy Spectacular" in North America)	Chris Bowden	Roary tries to ease Cici's nerves when Mr. Carburettor asks her to perform a big jump in front of a big crowd.
54	02	"Dodgems"	Rachel Dawson	Marsha tries her best to be the mechanic for the day while Big Chris takes a nap.
55	03	"Flash the Marshall" ("Furz the Marshall" in North America)	Dave Ingham	Mr. Carburettor wants Flash to get out of Silver Hatch race track forever, but Flash is given a second chance to stay by becoming a race marshal.
56	04	"Tall Story Roary"	Chris Parker	The Silver Hatch team must find a way to bring Roary back to the race track after the loud-speakers break down, and he has an accident.
57	05	"Hot Stuff"	Chris Parker	Big Chris and the cars go on a day trip to the beach.
58	06	"Car Boot Sale"	Chris Bowden	Big Chris tries to get rid of his old stuff at Farmer Green's car boot sale.
59	07	"Horse Powered Dinkie"	Rachel Dawson	Maxi and Drifter have an accident and they both become stuck in a ditch. FB and Dinkie the Donkey come to their rescue.
60	08	"Law and Order" ("Rules are Rules" in North America)	Wayne Jackman	Mr. Carburettor is fed up with the cars running amok on his track and summons PC Pete and Nick to restore order to the track. But might our overzealous policeman overstep the mark?
61	09	"Flash's Tea Party" ("Furz's Tea Party" in North America)	Wayne Jackman	Flash the rabbit invites everyone to a tea party to apologise for his troublesome behaviour.
62	10	"FB's Sleepover" ("Trucksy's Sleepover" in North America)	Wayne Jackman	FB is invited to a sleepover at the workshop with the cars.
63	11	"Hellie's a Winner"	Rachel Dawson	After Hellie's race after Big Chris angrily gives Maxi a big telling off for doing daft stunts, Maxi accuses Hellie of cheating when he joins the cars out on the track, but soon learns the error of his ways after Hellie rescues him.
64	12	"Cry Cold"	Chris Bowden	Big Chris catches a cold, and enjoys being fussed over so much that he decides not to tell everyone when he starts to feel better.
65	13	"Marsha's Wonderful Life"	Rachel Dawson	Marsha overhears her friends and she believes that she is bossy, so, she decides to take Zippee and depart Silver Hatch for good. But she soon discovers Silver Hatch is not the same without her.
66	14	"Let's Hear it for Big Chris"	Wayne Jackman	The Silver Hatch gang prepare a surprise for Big Chris being the longest-serving member of the Silver Hatch staff.
67	15	"Funny Business"	Chris Parker	Big Chris gets a box of jokes, which leads to all the cars playing tricks on each other.
68	16	"Nick Solves the Case"	Wayne Jackman	After Farmer Green discovers one of his cans of bio fuel is missing, Nick solves the case of the missing bio fuel.
69	17	"Simply the Best"	Chris Parker	Plugger rescues Molecom, and Roary tries to beat his best lap time.
70	18	"Cici Wins the Day" ("Zizzy Wins the Day" in North America)	Rachel Dawson	Cici is fed up of never winning, and decides not to take part in the big race. Can Roary make her change her mind?
71	19	"Heavy Loada"	Wayne Jackman	Loada gets stuck in the sand on the beach and realizes that sand and lorries don't mix!
72	20	"Testing Time for Maxi"	Chris Bowden	PC Pete (Officer Pete in the US) and his important police car Nick visit Silver Hatch to give the cars their road tests, but Maxi fails every single one.
73	21	"Mum's the Word" ("Mom's the Word" in North America)	Wayne Jackman	Big Chris' mother, Big Christine, is visiting Silver Hatch, so is Mama Mia.
74	22	"How the Hatch Was Won"	Rachel Dawson	Big Chris and Tin Top are watching a cowboy film, while Flash is causing trouble on the race track!
75	23	"Go Gadget James and Maxi"	Rachel Dawson	Maxi is jealous of James' gadgets, so he persuades Molecom to give him some, with hilarious results.
76	24	"Mr. Carburettor or Bust"	Dave Ingham	A bust of Mr. Carburettor is to be unveiled, but it gets destroyed.
77	25	"Home is Where the Hatch Is"	Rachel Dawson	Roary and Breeze swap places for one night. However, Roary misses Silver Hatch, and Breeze misses the beach.
78	26	"Putting on a Show"	Wayne Jackman	Roary is very nervous about a big race, so he goes off for a practice lap, and ends up crashing. This leads to all the other cars crashing too.
79	27	"Motormouth"	Wayne Jackman and Greg Lynn	A world-famous race commentator (Murray Walker) is invited to commentate for a very big race, much to Big Chris' fury.
80	28	"Dancing Queen" ("Queen of the Dancefloor" in North America)	Rachel Dawson	When Big Christine cannot go to a dancing contest because of her partner cancelling, the Silver Hatch gang prepare a surprise to cheer her up.
81	29	"Homesick Tin Top"	Chris Bowden	The cars try to cheer up Tin Top when he begins to miss his old racetrack.
82	30	"Save Our Tree"	Dave Ingham	Mr. Carburettor wants to cut down Flash's tree to build a new control tower, so the rabbit tries to stop it happening.
83	31	"New Juice"	Wayne Jackman	Conrod and Maxi have a race to test out some biofuel.
84	32	"FB for Football" ("Trucksy for Soccer" in North America)	Dave Ingham	Big Chris and his friends decide to play football on the beach. FB is unsure if he will be good enough at it.
85	33	"Mr. Carburettor's Birthday Suit"	Dominic Frisby	On a rainy race day, Mr. Carburettor's suit gets wet. What will he wear now?
86	34	"Big Bangs"	Wayne Jackman	Tin Top overcomes his fear of fireworks before a firework display at Farmer Green's farm.
87	35	"Silver Hatch Pizza"	Wayne Jackman	Mr. Carburettor wants pizza for lunch, but when Marsha tries to order, the pizzeria is closed. So Big Chris and the cars make their own pizzas as a surprise for Mr. Carburettor.
88	36	"The Silver Hatch Stars"	Rachel Dawson	Conrod and Roary rescue Breeze when she gets stuck on a cliff edge.
89	37	"High-Tech Overload"	Wayne Jackman	Drifter's computer breaks down and he becomes stranded in the countryside. Meanwhile, he starts to enjoy the peace and quiet.
90	38	"Workshop Chaos"	Wayne Jackman	Big Chris is furious after Marsha and Molecom tidy up his workshop while he is gone.
91	39	"Silver Hatch Shapes Up"	Chris Parker	Conrod is having trouble with his engine and Loada has a rattling sound in his engine. Roary and the other cars want to be as fast as Conrod, so they stick some extra parts on them.
92	40	"It's Go, Go, Go at Silver Hatch"	Wayne Jackman and Greg Lynn	Murray Walker returns to Silver Hatch to commentate for a stunt display.
93	41	"Pit Stop Perils"	Chris Bowden	When Roary and Maxi keep arguing over who is the fastest car, Mr. Carburettor organizes a big race with pit stops to settle their argument.
94	42	"Demolition Derby"	Rachel Dawson	Tin Top keeps crashing into things, and Big Chris tries to help him focus his energy into something productive.
95	43	"Manners, Please"	Rachel Dawson	Farmer Green and FB are nervous about going to Mama Mia's garden party, so James and the other cars teach them how to behave at the event.
96	44	"Big Chris' Big Jump"	Dave Ingham	Big Chris does a parachute jump for charity.
97	45	"Crash Landing"	Chris Bowden	Hellie breaks down and has a crash. Despite everyone's efforts, Hellie won't fly again - what could the problem be?
98	46	"Plugger's New Job" ("Lugga's New Job" in North America)	Chris Bowden	James breaks down, causing Mama Mia to ask Plugger to drive her around, but when the pair have fun together, the out-of-action chauffeur begins to get jealous.
99	47	"Big Chris Gets Lucky" ("Big Chris' Lucky Vest" in North America)	Chris Parker	Big Chris loses his lucky vest before a big race, and all the cars are nervous.
100	48	"Silver Hatch Fun Run"	Rachel Dawson	Big Chris is uncertain about taking part in a fun run, so Roary and Plugger try to make sure he trains for it without realizing.
101	49	"Silver Hatch Heroes"	Dave Ingham	A film director visits Silver Hatch to record his new movie, except all he wants to film is crashes.
102	50	"PC Roary" ("Officer Roary" in North America)	Chris Bowden	PC Pete makes Roary a police car for the day, but Roary soon goes a little too far.
103	51	"Winter Breeze"	Chris Bowden	Breeze visits Silver Hatch to help them get ready for Mama Mia's winter festival, but she keeps messing up.
104	52	"Brassless Band"	Rachel Dawson	Mr. Carburettor wants a brass band to open a parade, so Roary and the gang make up their own music.
