= Peter Orton =

British media entrepreneur and television producer

Peter Orton CVO
- Born: Peter Charles Orton; 17 June 1943; Portsmouth, Hampshire, England
- Died: 5 December 2007 (aged 64); Royal Wootton Bassett, Wiltshire, England
- Known for: Co-Founder of HIT Entertainment
- Spouse: Susan Stevenson (m. 1972–2007)
- Children: 1

Peter Charles Orton, CVO (17 June 1943 – 5 December 2007) was a British media entrepreneur and television producer noted for his work in children's television. He, Muppets creator Jim Henson and businesswoman Sophie Turner Laing founded HIT Entertainment in 1982. Orton led the company from 1989 to 2005 when he sold it to Apax. After HiT was sold to Apax in 2005, he retired but kept close contacts with the entertainment world.

== Personal life ==
Orton married his wife Susan Stevenson in 1972. They have a son named Jamie.

== President of Royal Wootton Bassett RFC ==
Peter was also a much loved president of Royal Wootton Bassett Rugby Football Club. Peter would visit and support the team whenever business commitments would allow. Peter was instrumental in the club's move to impressive new premises at Ballard's Ash on the edge of the town. He would certainly have been very proud of the opening of the new clubhouse, the Peter Orton Pavilion on 7 September 2013. The clubhouse was unveiled with a tribute to Peter by RFU president Robert Reeves.

== Illness and death ==
After being diagnosed with neck cancer in 1996, he served as chairman of the Head and Neck Cancer Research Trust.

Orton died of cancer in 2007 at the age of 64.

== Honours ==
Peter Orton was honoured with a BAFTA Special Award, the lifetime achievement award, in 2002 for his significant contribution within the children's television sector.

Peter Orton was appointed a Commander of the Royal Victorian Order (CVO) in the 2007 New Year Honours for his contribution to children's literacy.
