= Kate Harbour =

English voice actress

- Occupation: Voice actress
- Years active: 1995–present
- Father: Michael N. Harbour
- Relatives: Sue Cleaver (half-sister)

Kate Harbour is an English voice actress who is best known for providing many voices for the television series Bob the Builder, including Wendy, Dizzy, Mrs. Potts, Mrs. Broadbent, Mrs. Percival, Pilchard and Bird, as well as Timmy's mother in Shaun the Sheep.

== Biography ==
She is the daughter of actor Michael N. Harbour, whose appearances included Heartbeat, Casualty, Doctors, Dixon of Dock Green and Midsomer Murders.

== Career ==
She also provided the voice of Lyca in Lavender Castle, as well as Anita Knight and Doctor Doctor in The Secret Show. Her other roles include Oakie Doke, Shaun the Sheep, Fimbles, Boo! (as Laughing Duck), PB Bear and Friends, The Magic Key, Yoko! Jakamoko! Toto!, Enid Blyton's Enchanted Lands (The Magic of the Faraway Tree), Nick & Perry and Brambly Hedge.

She also supplied voices for the popular CBeebies children's series Timmy Time. She also voiced the third Enemy Keeper in the video game Dungeon Keeper 2. She has also provided voices for many commercials and audiobooks.

== Filmography ==
=== Film ===
Year	Title	Role	Notes
2001	Bob the Builder: A Christmas to Remember	Wendy (UK); Dizzy (UK); Mrs. Potts (UK); Mrs. Broadbent (UK); Mrs. Barbara Bentley (UK); Mrs. Percival (UK); Pilchard (UK/US); Bird (UK/US)	Direct-to-video
2003	Bob the Builder: The Knights of Can-a-Lot	Wendy (UK); Dizzy (UK); Mrs. Potts (UK); Mrs. Broadbent (UK); Mrs. Barbara Bentley (UK); Mrs. Percival (UK); Pilchard (UK/US); Bird (UK/US)	Direct-to-video
2004	Bob the Builder: Snowed Under: The Bobblesberg Winter Games	Wendy (UK); Dizzy (UK); Mrs. Potts (UK); Mrs. Broadbent (UK); Mrs. Barbara Bentley (UK); Mrs. Percival (UK); Pilchard (UK/US); Bird (UK/US)	Direct-to-video
2006	Bob the Builder: Built to Be Wild	Wendy (UK); Dizzy (UK); Mrs. Potts (UK); Mrs. Broadbent (UK); Mrs. Barbara Bentley (UK); Mrs. Percival (UK); Pilchard (UK/US); Bird (UK/US)	Direct-to-video
2008	Bob the Builder: Race to the Finish	Wendy (UK); Dizzy (UK); Mrs. Potts (UK); Mrs. Broadbent (UK); Mrs. Barbara Bentley (UK); Mrs. Percival (UK); Pilchard (UK/US); Bird (UK/US)	Direct-to-video
2015	Shaun the Sheep Movie	Timmy's Mum and Meryl	
2019	A Shaun the Sheep Movie: Farmageddon	Timmy's Mum and Agent Red	
2020	Go! Go! Cory Carson: The Chrissy	Mama Carson	UK dub
2026	Shaun the Sheep: The Beast of Mossy Bottom	Timmy's Mum	

=== Television ===
Year	Title	Role	Notes
1995	Oakie Doke	Additional voices	
1996–99	Percy the Park Keeper	Additional voices	Female animals
1997	The Enchanted World of Brambly Hedge	Episode: "Spring Story"	
1997	Enid Blyton's Enchanted Lands: The Magic Faraway Tree	Beth; Silky	
1999-2000	Lavender Castle	Lyca; Walking Stick	
1999-2000	The Big Knights	Mindy	
1999–2011	Bob the Builder	Wendy (UK); Dizzy (UK) Pilchard (UK/US); Bird (UK/US); Scratch (UK); Additional voices	
2000-01	The Magic Key	Wilma Page; Mrs. Robinson	
2001-02	The Wheels on the Bus	Female characters	
2002-04	Fimbles	Florrie	Taking over from Shelley Longworth in the second season
2003	Yoko! Jakamoko! Toto!	Additional voices	Episodes: "The Mango" "The Bad Word"
2003–06	Boo!	Laughing Duck	
2005	Bob the Builder: When Bob Became a Builder	Wendy (UK); Dizzy (UK); Mrs. Potts (UK); Pilchard (UK/US); Bird (UK/US)	Direct-to-video special episode
2006–2007	The Secret Show	Anita Knight; Doctor Doctor; Additional voices	
2007–present	Shaun the Sheep	Additional voices	
2009–12	Timmy Time	Additional voices	
2015–23	Messy Goes to OKIDO	Zoe	
2015	Shaun the Sheep: The Farmer's Llamas	Timmy's Mum	TV special
2020-21	Go! Go! Cory Carson	Mama Carson	UK dub
2023	Kizazi Moto: Generation Fire	Awa	Episode: "Enkai"

=== Video games ===
Year	Title	Role
1999	Dungeon Keeper 2	Enemy Keeper #3
2001	Bob the Builder: Can We Fix It?	Wendy (UK); Dizzy (UK); Mrs Broadbent (UK); Pilchard (UK/US); Bird (UK/US)
