= The Secret Show =

- Genre: Action; Espionage; Children's; Farce
- Created by: Tony Collingwood
- Written by: Tony Collingwood; Ken Pontac; Jimmy Hibbert; Christopher O'Hare; Andrea Tran
- Directed by: Tony Collingwood; Andrea Tran
- Voices of: Alan Marriott; Kate Harbour; Rob Rackstraw; Keith Wickham; Martin Hyder; Jimmy Hibbert
- Composer: Roger Jackson
- Country of origin: United Kingdom
- No. of series: 2
- No. of episodes: 52

Production
- Executive producer: Michael Carrington
- Producer: Christopher O'Hare
- Running time: 13 minutes
- Production company: Collingwood O'Hare Entertainment (Note: As The Secret Show Limited)

Original release
- Network: BBC Two; CBBC
- Release: 16 September 2006 – 30 April 2007

The Secret Show is a British animated television series created by Tony Collingwood and produced by Collingwood O'Hare Entertainment. It was commissioned by the BBC and distributed globally by BBC Worldwide.

The series premiered on 16 September 2006 during TMi on BBC Two. A total of 52 episodes were produced.

== Details ==
The series follows 2 spies, Anita Knight and Victor Volt as they try to save the world from the latest threats to civilization. They work for the secret organization, U.Z.Z. (Umbo Zim Zam), which is owned by their commanding agent, whose codename is "Changed Daily" for reasons of security, always to an unusual or ridiculous phrase. U.Z.Z. also comprises Professor Professor, whose inventions (that are usually untested and highly dangerous) and scientific background frequently save the day; Special Agent Ray who often runs missions behind the scenes; and a large team of standard agents.

They frequently counter threats from their main enemy, T.H.E.M. - The Horrible Evil Menace. T.H.E.M. is headed up by the evil antagonist in the series, Doctor Doctor, who is intent on taking over the world, and has her own crack team of agents called "Expendables" who wear billiard ball-style helmets. However, some episodes do feature a different set of enemies, such as the underground species of Imposters or Reptogators, the space alien Floaty Heads or Changed Daily's nanny as a child, who has world domination plans of her own. Many episodes feature a sealed orange cylinder, known only as "The Secret Thing". It is not known what the Secret Thing actually is, although in one episode Doctor Doctor steals it, however it is a fake, filled with confetti. Even when it is not central to the episode, the Secret Thing is always featured, half poking out from somewhere. Each episode also features a robotic spider walking up the wall and a four digit code which can be entered on the Secret Show website to unlock extras.

The show never starts as "The Secret Show", but rather as "The Fluffy Bunny Show" for young children, which features Sweet Little Granny in a rocking chair, with a banjo and six fluffy, pink bunnies. As she begins to sing the intro for her show, she's interrupted by agents for U.Z.Z., headed by Agent Ray, and commandeer the show, always using a different method of dispatch. The Secret Show then begins, much to Sweet Little Granny's dismay. The bunnies, however, frequently appear throughout the show in unexpected places. And in "A Purrfect Villain", Sweet Old Grandpa appears instead of Granny because she was getting a hip replacement operation (presumably from an injury caused by one of U.Z.Z.'s actions). When the show gets interrupted by Ray, Grandpa picks up the bunnies and runs from the agents who appears many times in that episode. The US version sometimes edits this opening out of the broadcast.

== Characters ==
=== U.Z.Z. agents ===
- Victor Volt (voiced by Alan Marriott) is one of the two main protagonists; wearing a blue jumpsuit, and riding a purple skybike, he is partnered with Anita Knight. He's the only American-Canadian agent, was recruited by U.Z.Z at a comic book convention in San Diego, and is easily distracted and often acts childishly, sometimes getting the two agents into trouble or causing a crisis that requires further intervention by U.Z.Z. Victor's level of competence generally changes depending on the situation; in some cases he acts incompetently, whereas only scenes later he may manipulate the situation brilliantly. Victor is also a vegetarian and a "Ninth Grade Stone-Skipping Champion" (revealed in the episode "The Abyss").
- Anita Knight (voiced by Kate Harbour) is one of the two main protagonists; with blonde hair that ends in a cute little curl, wearing a purple jumpsuit and headband, and riding a green skybike, she is partnered with Victor Volt. Somewhat more intelligent than Victor, she often has to save the day when Victor lands them in a sticky situation. She claims to be allergic to sea water, but when in sea water, she grows a mermaid tail (for reasons unknown.)
- Professor Professor (voiced by Rob Rackstraw) is a brilliant scientist from Germany, and the only other member of U.Z.Z apart from Victor and Anita who sit in the main meeting room with Changed Daily. He has a bald head with some green hair in the back, and wear red glasses and sometimes a "Pointy Stick" that extends. He speaks with a German accent. Although something of a mad scientist, his inventions are often brilliant, although occasionally some may backfire (which is why he calls most of his inventions "totally untested und highly dangerous") and create a threat, such as a baldness cure that threatens to consume the earth with hair and giant Head Lice. His parents always wanted a professor in the family so they named him Professor, and when he became a professor at U.Z.Z. he was named Professor Professor (in which Changed Daily calls it a silly name). He once was a student at "The School for the Chronically Gifted", and a classmate of the show's antagonist, Doctor Doctor. Changed Daily is under the impression he is French. He always asks Victor "Are you still alive?" after he crashes (which is often and is usually caused by him).
- Changed Daily (voiced by Keith Wickham) is the leader of U.Z.Z., with a strong British accent, a mustache and a classy suit. He always has a new name at the beginning of every episode; he will mention that "For reasons of security, my name is Changed Daily. Today, you may call me..." before then using his special cell phone to get his latest codename. This always turns out to be ridiculous, much to the amusement of Victor, Anita, Professor Professor, and others. Prior to becoming the commander, Changed Daily was once a top agent occupying the role that Victor now has; he was partnered with Lucy Woo, Anita's counterpart, and she is the only one who knows what Changed Daily's real name is. He always travels with his fireplace at his side to lean on. Whilst he excels as the leader of U.Z.Z, real field work is no longer his strong point, since he apparently has not done much of it in many years, but in one episode he and Professor Professor are demoted when accidentally falling into a training section.
- Special Agent Ray (voiced by Martin Hyder) is the Unit Commander for U.Z.Z. and provides back-up for Victor and Anita in the field. He is good at keeping his cool under fire and very loyal to U.Z.Z. Ray has a British accent, Elvis Presley-styled hair, an official blue suit, head phone communicator in his ear, and wears sunglasses. Often running missions behind the scenes, he is seen at the beginning of the show when he and his agents clear out the set of "The Fluffy Bunny Show", hosted by Sweet Little Granny, by saying "this time slot is needed urgently". He is also a vegetarian (although he eats fish) and has a nephew named Roy.
- Agent Kowalski (voiced by Kate Harbour) is the only other female U.Z.Z agent seen in The Secret Show, besides Anita. Little is known about her, except that she is the rank of a standard U.Z.Z agent, she is an American, and is new to U.Z.Z.

=== Other regulars ===
- The World Leader (voiced by Kate Harbour) is, as the name implies, the democratically elected leader of the entire world, and is a target for many villains. Her speech appears to be nothing but gibberish; her husband is able to interpret her supposed babbling. However, the official site implies that the World Leader is speaking ancient Aztec language, though in a very discordant manner.
- The World Leader's Husband (voiced by Rob Rackstraw) is small in height, and wears some sort of armour-type outfit. He has a quiet voice and seems to be the only person who can understand what the world leader says.
- Stacey Stern (voiced by Kate Harbour) is a news reporter, often seen reporting the mission currently being investigated by U.Z.Z. Her catch-phrase sign-off is 'You may be you, but I'm Stacy Stern!', lampooning a common TV news reporter style of self-introduction.
- Sweet Little Granny (voiced by Kate Harbour) is the host of The Fluffy Bunny Show, played before The Secret Show "steals" its time slot for television. She is married to Sweet Old Grandpa, who once hosted The Fluffy Bunny Show when Sweet Little Granny was having a hip replacement operation. When she made her debut on The Fluffy Bunny Show, she used to be known as Sweet Little Girl and, on her debut day, Changed Daily led a team of U.Z.Z. agents to steal the time slot just like Special Agent Ray currently does.
- Alphonse is an artist, although he is also seen producing an U.Z.Z. training film, entering a musical piece in the world anthem competition and commenting on illegal monument racing as Stacey Stern's "architectural correspondent". He is also a secret admirer of Anita and regularly shuns Victor, much to his distress. He also tortures Victor with some of his artwork (like his ball of whiteness being made of belly button fluff).
- Kent B. Trusted is, unbeknownst to U.Z.Z., a double agent working for T.H.E.M. He earned the highest medal you can get as an U.Z.Z. agent when he tried to help Doctor Doctor get the Secret Thing and failed. The identity of what exactly the Secret Thing is, is yet to be found out. His name is a pun on the phrase "Can't Be Trusted".

=== Villains ===
- Doctor Doctor (voiced by Kate Harbour) is the main antagonist of The Secret Show and head of the evil organization, T.H.E.M - The Horrible Evil Menace. Intent on taking over the world, she is the cause of many of U.Z.Z.'s problems, but always fails. She is also known for her bad eyesight and bad teeth that seem to vibrate whenever she talks above a whisper.
  - T.H.E.M. (The Horrible Evil Menace) is headed up by the evil Doctor Doctor, who is intent on taking over the world, and has her own crack team of agents, known as "Expendables" who wear pool ball-style helmets. Each helmet has a number except for the one worn by Kent B. Trusted. His helmet has the letter 'X' instead of a number.
- The Impostors are extremely dangerous villains that live 90 miles below the surface of the Earth and can "impost" humans using "Hologrammatic Replication" with their eye-shaped symbol on their chest. They like the cold and are allergic to Penguins. Inside their suits they are small, one-eyed, maggot-like creatures, and they can change size to look like giant Maggots. Their leader is known as Red Eye and has one eye and an eye-shaped symbol on its chest. When not imposting humans, they speak in gibberish, though they can be heard to make out the phrase "ding ba-doo" which means freezing the world. The Impostors can only survive outside their impostor suits at temperatures below freezing-so their ultimate aim is to create a new ice age.
- The Floaty Heads (in reality known as the Zurbulons, as revealed in the episode Secret Santa) are aliens from the planet Zabulon, and are helium-based life forms, whose helium-filled heads float above their bodies. Their leader is 12-year-old 'Prince Spong, who is extremely afraid of his mother. The Floaty Heads have never forgiven Victor for lying to them about The Ball of Spong, and Prince Spong has never forgiven Changed Daily for eating it. The Floaty Heads call humans "Sticky Heads". Also Spong's sister is Princess Ping who might have a small crush on Victor. For some strange reason the sound of impending doom is heard when they come. They hold 'popping out ceremonies' for Floaties who are going to have their head float out of their bodies. The only known ceremony is Ping's who was scared. At the ceremonies everyone shouts the person's name and rise to help them pop. Ping thought it was very hard. At the ceremonies they swap heads. At Ping's ceremony Victor or 'Pong' told her to breathe and push, as if she was a human giving birth. Popping out ceremonies are ceremonies Floaty Heads have for young floaties when they pop out. Before they become floaties like Spong they have an eyeball sticking out. There the floaty who is about to pop out their name is called about five times then rise until they pop. One of the only known ceremonies were Princess Ping's and she found it quite difficult and scary since she had a hard time popping out and was scared even saying I am a brave Princess in her room before her ceremony. After the floaty pops out the rest applaud and Spong and Ping's mother tells the floaty who they want to swap heads with (which may be either permanent or a form of greeting). At Ping's ceremony she chose Pong (who was only Victor in disguise) until the balloons popped which Victor and Anita were using as fake floaty heads. Ping couldn't believe she almost swapped with a sticky head and is heartbroken over the fact that she trusted one. Ping cried in her bedroom but Victor apologized and she then let Victor and Anita go, lying to Spong she didn't see a sticky head.
- Reptogators are the most feared reptile-like creatures that live 60 miles below the surface of the Earth, and are naturally stupid, and make terrible pets due to their foul stench. They only become intelligent by sucking out the brainwaves of other creatures. They are able to run at 83 miles per hour and will sometimes where human "disguises" to blend in. Victor and Anita's belts ring every time they're in the vicinity. They are "Neighbors" to the Impostors underground due to them living 60 miles above, while they live 90 miles under.
- The Chef is a villain who tried to bake Anita in a pie, but failed. His left arm is an egg beater he calls Mr. Wisk.

=== Others ===
- The Kid is a boy genius who is the real leader of U.Z.Z. He is only featured in "Reptogator Attack".
- The Secret Man is the top U.Z.Z. agent, next to the Secret Woman in which whom Changed Daily has a crush on.
- Professor Zoomottle is a character appearing in Monument Racers. He is Professor Professor's and Doctor Doctor's old teacher from the School for the Chronically Gifted. His top students, twin geniuses Aaron and Darren, were causing havoc by racing monuments across the globe using Weird Little Motor Thingies, but after U.Z.Z. stopped the monument racing, they took off with a jelly-fier. He also makes an appearance in "The Z-Ray Goggles of Power", which only was Professor Professor in a disguise.

== Vehicles and equipment ==
=== Skybike ===
The Skybike is the standard-issue flying vehicle for U.Z.Z. Agents, similar in appearance to a jet ski, with a single jet or rocket motor at the back for propulsion, and two smaller retro-boosters on the front. Although, in the episode "Monument Racers", Professor Professor invented giant high-speed engines installed on the back of the Skybike, used to catch up with flying monuments. Skybikes are capable of vertical take off and landing, as well as being able to hover and fly backwards and have retractable tripod-style undercarriage. Most U.Z.Z. skybikes are blue, but Anita Knight's is green, and Victor Volt's is purple. Skybikes are equipped with many gadgets and equipment suitable for a large number of situations, including a Bike Cannon laser, retractable glass dome for use in outer space or underwater, claw-grips and magnets for grabbing, and even an 'Anti-Meteorite Force Field Deflector' to provide protection against space debris. The skybike was once stolen by Doctor Doctor. T.H.E.M. had also copied the vehicle but shares the shape of an arachnid, sometimes Doctor Doctor will ride on these sitting in the back of the spinneret (like a throne) while it's driven by an Expendable, similar to that of a Chariot.

== Episodes ==
=== Season 1 (2006) ===
No.	Title	Written by	Original release date
1	"The Secret Thing"	Tony Collingwood	16 September 2006
Someone is trying to steal The Secret Thing. Is it Chuckle Botty, Victor, Anita, or some sort of shape-changing Impostor? Can Victor tell the difference? And will he ever find out what The Secret Thing actually is? Changed Daily's name of the day: Chuckle Botty. Number of Fluffy Bunnies: 8 Secret Code: 7311
2	"Who Stole Switzerland?"	Mark Holloway	23 September 2006
Someone is stealing Earth's gravity, causing the continents to float away. Victor and Anita stow away in one of the gravity-sucking machines; the trail leads to Mars, and falling-down parties - but unless they act fast, both planets are in trouble... Changed Daily's name of the day: Lammy Wammy Kins. Number of Fluffy Bunnies: 6 Secret Code: 6371
3	"Bogie Ball"	Tony Collingwood	30 September 2006
THEM have photographic proof that the World Leader eats her bogies. What does this have to do with the theft of a giant ball of bogies from the sculptor Alphonse? And why are all the Expendables wearing nose-shields..? Changed Daily's name of the day: Mummy Dearest. Number of Fluffy Bunnies: 5 Secret Code: 2829
4	"Wedgie Attack!"	Mark Zaslove	7 October 2006
Victor and Anita are on the run from UZZ after apparently giving the world leader's husband a wedgie on live TV. Soon, all of UZZ is hiding at Victor's mum's house in disguise. Could it be an Impostor plot? Is Cheeky Chops safe..? Changed Daily's name of the day: Cheeky Chops. Number of Fluffy Bunnies: 4 Secret Code: 6301
5	"Commando Babies"	Mark Zaslove	14 October 2006
Nanna Poopoo is kidnapping important people and using a babysitter ray to turn them into commando babies. Soon she will be the only adult. If Victor can manage to burp, he might stand a chance of stopping her... Changed Daily's name of the day: Warty Fingle Blaster. Number of Fluffy Bunnies: 7 Secret Code: 2485
6	"Bad Hair Day"	Lee Pressman	14 October 2006
Doctor Doctor hacks the agents' brains for intel. Changed Daily's name of the day: Pongo Piffle Paws. Later changed to Nancy Toodlepoops. Number of Fluffy Bunnies: 3 Secret Code: 2612
7	"And That's for Helsinki"	Tony Collingwood	21 October 2006
Each time Helsinki Man tries to kill Victor and Anita, he yells "And that's for Helsinki!" It's starting to get a bit annoying. What are they supposed to have done - and why does Professor Professor insist that they must never go to Helsinki? Changed Daily's name of the day: Fluffy Tummy. Number of Fluffy Bunnies: 4 Secret Code: 1698
8	"The Ball of Spong"	Jimmy Hibbert & Tony Collingwood	21 October 2006
The Floaty-heads demand The Ball of Spong, or they will sieve the Earth. But the ball and Bobby Bouncy Buns are trapped in a Mark I Indestructible Survival Pod - with no food. And the ball smells kind of minty... Changed Daily's name of the day: Bobby Bouncy Buns. Number of Fluffy Bunnies: 5 Secret Code: 1808
9	"Destination Sun"	Mark Zaslove	28 October 2006
Doctor Doctor has a remote control for the Sun -- at least, until Victor steps on it. Now the only chance for the Earth is for them all to go to the Sun and relight it... Changed Daily's name of the day: Oinky Doinky. Number of Fluffy Bunnies: 4 Secret Code: 3571
10	"The Secret Room"	Ken Pontac	28 October 2006
What is the secret of Robert Baron's secret room? In order to find out, Victor and Anita will have to be shrunk so that they can pass as children; and Professor Professor will have to wear a dress... Changed Daily's name of the day: Patty Cake. Number of Fluffy Bunnies: 2 Secret Code: 1739 Guest Star: Tom Baker
11	"Alien Attack"	Tony Collingwood	4 November 2006
It's the most momentous moment in earth's history: first contact with a friendly alien race. Everything goes fine, until Anita eats the alien on live TV.... Changed Daily's name of the day: Peek-a-Boo. Number of Fluffy Bunnies: 5 Secret Code: 8260
12	"Mirror Mirror"	Ken Segall	4 November 2006
In a mirror universe where THEM rule the world, UZZ are reduced to delivering Pizza. But for the mirror Doctor Doctor, that's not enough: she wants our world, too... Changed Daily's name of the day: Ivor Twinkle Toe. Number of Fluffy Bunnies: 2 Secret Code: 1088
13	"Dr. Hypno Returns Again!"	Ben Townsend & Tony Collingwood	11 November 2006
Only the retired UZZ agent, Zac Meadows, can save the world from Dr Hypno. But all is not as it appears... Changed Daily's name of the day: Timmy's Cheeky Chipmunk. Number of Fluffy Bunnies: 8 Secret Code: 7592
14	"Secret Sleep"	Ken Pontac & Tony Collingwood	11 November 2006
Why is everyone on Earth so sleepy - and dreaming of dancing? To defeat Doctor Doctor, Victor Anita and Snuggle Bunny must fall asleep under laboratory controlled conditions. Professor Professor will even howl them to sleep... Changed Daily's name of the day: Snuggle Bunny. Later in a dream, It's briefly changed to Rock Justice. Number of Fluffy Bunnies: 5 Secret Code: 3570
15	"Super-Vic!"	Jimmy Hibbert	18 November 2006
Victor acquires a cloak that gives him super-powers, and gets carried away with the idea of being a superhero. But the cloak belongs to the one person that UZZ fear, Eartha Quakea, and UZZ must persuade him to give it back... Changed Daily's name of the day: Mimsy Woo-Woo. Number of Fluffy Bunnies: 5 Secret Code: 1980
16	"The Thing That Goes Ping"	Baz Hawkins	18 November 2006
Professor Professor doesn't have to tell Victor and Anita why they have to rescue The Satellite That Goes Ping from the Bermuda Trapezoid. It's a secret. Doctor Doctor and the mutant piggies don't know either, but they want the satellite too, and what is with the band that plays ominous music every time somebody says Bermuda Trapezoid... Changed Daily's name of the day: Honda Von Lamp Gurgle. Number of Fluffy Bunnies: 5 Secret Code: 7230
17	"The Trousers of Doom"	Dave Ingham	25 November 2006
If Victor and Anita don't find The Trousers of Doom before Doctor Doctor does, the entire universe could just disappear. And Victor would never get his shoes back... Changed Daily's name of the day: Fudgy Burtles. Number of Fluffy Bunnies: 5 Secret Code: 1413
18	"What's in the Box?"	Dave Ingham	25 November 2006
What is in Professor Professor's box? Why does everyone want to take it from Anita and Victor? Why must they not open it under any circumstances? And will Victor get to hold it? Changed Daily's name of the day: Squeaky Fritter. Number of Fluffy Bunnies: 4 Secret Code: 1482
19	"Return of the Killer Toothbrush"	Lee Pressman	2 December 2006
What did Doctor Doctor and Professor Professor work on in the abandoned space station when they were in The School For the Chronically Gifted together? Is it something that is trying to return to earth and wreak havoc? Changed Daily's name of the day: Slinky Waggle Bot. Number of Fluffy Bunnies: 3 Secret Code: 2510
20	"Reptogator Attack!"	Mark Holloway	2 December 2006
Who is The Kid, and why must Victor and his strangely brutish new partner protect him? What do the Reptogators have to do with all this? Anita plans to find out... Changed Daily's name of the day: Wibbly Wobbly Bobbly. Number of Fluffy Bunnies: 8 Secret Code: 9437
21	"Mr. Atom"	Jimmy Hibbert	9 December 2006
Victor doesn't believe that UZZ's smallest agent is too small to be seen. Unfortunately for him, Mr. Atom is also the shortest-tempered agent... Changed Daily's name of the day: Pinky Woodle. Number of Fluffy Bunnies: 4 Secret Code: 1701
22	"When Good Food Goes Bad"	Laura Beaumont & Paul Larson	9 December 2006
When Victor and Anita foil The Chef, he vows revenge - revenge that doesn't seem possible until Victor bites into a carrot, and it presses charges against him... Changed Daily's name of the day: Tequin Snuggle Pence. Number of Fluffy Bunnies: 2 Secret Code: 2641
23	"Flick the Switch"	Tony Collingwood	16 December 2006
Victor has always wondered what the switch next to his chair in the briefing room does. But the answer to that question involves Reptogators, Impostors, and Almost Certain Doom... Changed Daily's name of the day: Snortington Fairy Shoes. Number of Fluffy Bunnies: 3 Secret Code: 2940
24	"Giant Brain of Terror!"	Dave Ingham	16 December 2006
What is the giant brain that UZZ have found frozen in ice in the arctic? The very last thing they should do is wake it up... Changed Daily's name of the day: Pimlico Button Fluff. Later changed to Nincy Nancy La-La. Number of Fluffy Bunnies: 5 Secret Code: 6590
25	"You're History!"	David Stafford & Tony Collingwood	23 December 2006
Professor Professor is convinced that no one can invent an uninventing ray. But it appears that Doctor Doctor has proved him wrong - and unless UZZ can do something about it, they'll end up saving the world with only stone axes to help them... Changed Daily's name of the day: Windy Pops. Later changed to Squidgy Dimples. Then changed to Sweaty Ears. Number of Fluffy Bunnies: 4 Secret Code: 1582
26	"A Purrfect Villain"	Paddy Granleese & Tony Collingwood	23 December 2006
Due to an accident with a totally untested and highly dangerous teleport device, Victor and the villainous cat Mr. Cuddles have got mixed up. Victor has nine lives and wants to chase balls of string; and Mr. Cuddles now knows The Secret Code To Destroy The World... Changed Daily's name of the day: Leopold Snagtrouser. Number of Fluffy Bunnies: 7 Secret Code: 2497

=== Season 2 (2007) ===
No. overall	No. in season	Title	Written by	Original release date
27	1	"Lucky Leo"	Tony Collingwood	17 February 2007
UZZ don't stand a chance of catching the luckiest man in the world - unless Professor Professor can synthesise his luck and pass it on to Victor... Changed Daily's name of the day: Pooky Wooky.
28	2	"Zombie Attack!"	Mark Holloway	24 February 2007
Doctor Doctor has two secret zombifying code words: say either one of them and you turn into a zombie. Unfortunately, the two words are "no" and "yes"... Changed Daily's name of the day: Yummy Yummy, Says My Tummy.
29	3	"Imposting the Imposters"	Tony Collingwood	3 March 2007
Professor Professor sends Victor and Anita to infiltrate the Impostors' base - where they find that he was kidnapped by The Impostors a month ago, and never escaped... Changed Daily's name of the day: Kimberly Bimberly.
30	4	"Ammonites Rule!"	Tony Collingwood	10 March 2007
It's time to pay the rent for the Earth to the Ammonites - one slipper orchid from the top of Mount Kinabalu, once every thousand years. If The Impostors get to Ammonia first, they will control the Earth - to say nothing of what will happen if the Ammonites find out that the orchid is a plastic one... Changed Daily's name of the day: Nibbles McPee.
31	5	"Victor of the Future"	Laura Beaumont & Paul Larson	17 March 2007
A future Victor has come to warn UZZ that something terrible is about to happen. But he's not allowed to say what it is... Changed Daily's name of the day: Nibbly Nobbly Knock Knees.
32	6	"Monument Racers"	Tony Collingwood & Jimmy Hibbert	24 March 2007
Someone is attaching weird little motor thingies to famous buildings and using them to hold illegal monument races. It's a terrible threat to security - what would happen if Doctor Doctor got hold of the technology? Changed Daily's name of the day: Sammy Saucebox.
33	7	"Impostor Attack!"	Alex Williams	31 March 2007
All the world's plumbers are missing. The trail leads to The Impostors, who have a plan to end the world as we know it. And Professor Professor's solution isn't very safe, either... Changed Daily's name of the day: Silly Lily Longbottom.
34	8	"Secret Spider"	Mark Holloway	7 April 2007
The Imposters attempt to create a new Ice Age, with ice explosions around the globe... Changed Daily's name of the day: Polly Wolly Dolly.
35	9	"Rise of the Floaty-Heads"	Dave Ingham	14 April 2007
The Floaty-heads have shrunk the Solar System to give to Princess Ping as a mobile. Victor and Anita must pretend to be Floaty-heads so they can steal the Solar System back, and escape. But Victor becomes fond of shy, insecure Ping, and wants to help... Changed Daily's name of the day: Cha-Cha Mittens.
36	10	"Catch the Birdman!"	Ben Townsend	15 April 2007
After playing a part in an UZZ training film, The Birdman flips out when it is revealed that the film will never be shown in public. He steals the film, and intends to use it to get a career in the movies, and all the birdseed he can eat... Changed Daily's name of the day: Spicy Onion Dip.
37	11	"World Anthem"	Tony Collingwood	7 May 2007
THEM have entered the World Anthem Competition, so Victor and Anita must enter as well, and find out why. Obviously they can't be planning to brainwash everyone with their song, because that only works in old cartoon shows... Changed Daily's name of the day: Englebert Humperdink.
38	12	"It's a Hamster World"	Tony Collingwood	8 May 2007
Ickle Baby-Kins is finally persuaded to talk about his nick-knacks. On the back of a picture of his old partner, Lucy Woo, they find a note asking him to rescue her - twenty years ago... Changed Daily's name of the day: Ickle Baby-Kins
39	13	"The Fluffy Bunnython of Doom"	Baz Hawkins	27 October 2007
It's time for everyone to send carrots to Sweet Little Granny for the burrowless bunnies. But her show seems a little different this year; and why is everyone donating their house? Victor and Anita must find out quickly, because Tickle Tickle Poppy Tock has donated the UZZ building... Changed Daily's name of the day: Tickle Tickle Poppy Tock.
40	14	"The Wobble Men from Dimension Ten"	Lee Pressman	27 October 2007
The Wobble Men have finally broken through - and the only one that can save the world is Victor's father, trapped behind wobbly lines for twenty years... Changed Daily's name of the day: Sissy Flip Flops.
41	15	"Mission to Monkey Nut Island"	Lee Pressman	27 October 2007
On an undercover mission inside THEM's secret holiday resort, Victor wins the Best Evil Plan To Destroy UZZ competition... Changed Daily's name of the day: Bubbles Kissy Cuddles.
42	16	"A Hairy Scary World"	Lee Pressman	21 April 2007
Another one of Professor Professor's crazy cures for baldness has backfired. If Anita and Victor cannot recover the baldy gene from his identical twin brother, the world will be overrun by hair (and 20-foot-tall (6.1 m) head lice). The solution? Stage an opera... Changed Daily's name of the day: Brocolli Spears.
43	17	"World Savers"	Dave Ingham	22 April 2007
What chance do UZZ have at saving the world from the Gobblotron when World Savers Inc. are so mysteriously good at it - and when Professor Professor has accepted a job with them? Changed Daily's name of the day: Fru-Fru Flubber Faucet.
44	18	"The Hand"	Mark Zaslove	23 April 2007
UZZ decide to cancel their line of Simon Sayz action figures and go with a computer game instead. Simon swears revenge. And when he accidentally gets covered with nano-goo, it looks like he'll get his wish - unless Anita can get to level 13 first... Changed Daily's name of the day: Rumpelstiltskinny.
45	19	"Secret Santa"	Tony Collingwood	27 October 2007
The Floaty-Heads latest collection includes The World Leader and Pineapple Chunks. There seems to be no-one who can break into their planet to rescue them. Well, maybe one person - someone that can break into any house, once a year, to leave presents... Changed Daily's name of the day: Pineapple Chunks.
46	20	"The Z-Ray Goggles of Power"	Mark Zaslove	24 April 2007
Who gave Doctor Doctor the technology to take over UZZ base? Why does her snivelling sound so familiar to Professor Professor? How can UZZ and THEM possibly work together to save them all from the giant Purple Hole? Changed Daily's name of the day: Frothy Potty.
47	21	"The Secret Man"	Dave Ingham	25 April 2007
The Secret Man has disappeared. To find him, Anita and Victor must locate The One Breath Lady, and - providing they can understand her - unravel an Impostor plot to take over the world... Changed Daily's name of the day: Flobber Wobber Bobber Bobber Bobber Bobber.
48	22	"Planet Professor Professor"	Ken Segall	26 April 2007
An overworked Professor Professor has come down with Brain Seepage - some of his knowledge has been squeezed out in the form of a tiny planet orbiting his own head. Victor and Anita must travel there to retrieve a forgotten unlock code - or Dippy Dippy Dippy Dopps will be permanently turned into a very large orchid... Changed Daily's name of the day: Dippy Dippy Dippy Dopps.
49	23	"The Abyss"	Paddy Granleese	27 October 2007
In which we learn the startling secret behind Anita's seawater allergy, and fishfood torpedoes and a giant sperm whale save the day. Changed Daily's name of the day: Princess Dainty Cakes.
50	24	"Stuff Stealers"	Tony Collingwood	28 April 2007
Has Victor really stolen all the spoons in the world? Why are all the parrots shouting "help"? And why does everyone's hair look so messy? To see the answers, Victor must have his blind spots removed... Changed Daily's name of the day: Auntie Norbert.
51	25	"The Villain Nobody Took Seriously"	Tony Collingwood	29 April 2007
After saving the world from The Chef, Doctor Doctor, Reptogators, and Impostors, Victor and Anita have Save Fatigue and the world is taken over by a clown who demands that buildings wear silly hats and everyone says "bim"... Changed Daily's name of the day: Flouncy Wouncy Bouncy Bim
52	26	"Secret Double Agent"	Ken Pontac	30 April 2007
Why is The Secret Thing being stolen so frequently? Where has Doctor Doctor taken Stinky Winky and his fireplace? Surely none of this can be anything to do with UZZ agent Kent B. Trusted...? Note: This episode is the series finale. Changed Daily's name of the day: Stinky Winky.

== Production and awards ==
In 2007, The Secret Show won two Children's BAFTA Awards, one for the show itself (as Best Animated Show) and one for its web site (in the Best Interactive category).

The Secret Show has had several notable guest stars, including Tom Baker as Robert Baron, Stephen Fry as Lucky Leo, Penelope Keith as Nana Poo-Poo, Mike Reid as Mr Atom, and Felicity Kendal as Lucy Woo.

== International broadcast ==
BBC Worldwide secured global distribution, merchandising and DVD rights to the series in April 2006. In the same month, BBC Worldwide Americas pre-sold the first season of the series in the United States to Nicktoons Network for broadcast in January 2007.

BBC Worldwide have also pre-sold the series to Jetix Latin America, Disney Channel Germany, ABC1, Nickelodeon Australia, BBC Kids, Teletoon+, MBC 3, 2×2, Disney Channel Latin America, Prisma+, TVB Pearl, RTÉ2 (as part of the network's children's programming lineup The Den), BFBS (being shown on the children's wrapper programme Room 785), Kids Central, CCN TV6 (with the series airing on the channel's cartoon lineup TV6 Cartoon Express) and TSR 2.
