= Bob the Builder =

British children's animated television show

- Also known as: Bob the Builder: Project: Build It (series 10–16); Bob the Builder: Ready, Steady, Build! (17–18)
- Genre: Children's animation
- Created by: Keith Chapman
- Directed by: Sarah Ball; Liz Whitaker; Brian Little; Nick Herbert; Gilly Fogg; Andy Burns; Geoff Walker
- Voices of: Neil Morrissey; Rob Rackstraw; Kate Harbour; Rupert Degas; Colin McFarlane; Maria Darling; Emma Tate; Richard Briers; June Whitfield
- Theme music composer: Paul K. Joyce
- Opening theme: "Can We Fix It?" by Neil Morrissey
- Ending theme: "Can We Fix It?" (instrumental)
- Composer: Keith Hopwood
- Country of origin: United Kingdom
- Original language: English
- No. of series: 18
- No. of episodes: 250 (+10 specials) (list of episodes)

Production
- Executive producers: Kate Fawkes; Theresa Plummer-Andrews; Peter Curtis
- Producer: Jackie Cockle
- Editors: Zyggy Markiewicz; Bruce Marshall; Adam Taylor
- Camera setup: Single camera (1999–2004); Multi-camera (2005–2009)
- Production company: HIT Entertainment

Original release
- Network: BBC One
- Release: 12 April 1999 – 19 February 2001
- Network: CBeebies
- Release: 1 April 2002 – 31 December 2011

Bob the Builder is a British animated children's television series created by Keith Chapman for HIT Entertainment which ran from 12 April 1999 to 31 December 2011 in the United Kingdom on the BBC, first on BBC One and later CBeebies. The series centres on the adventures and escapades of a general contractor named Bob who owns a team of anthropomorphic construction vehicles that go about their day helping out with construction work in several towns.

The show used stop-motion animation for most of the series as well as Project: Build It, provided by Hot Animation in Manchester. The series changed to CGI animation in 2010 for its final two seasons; titled Ready, Steady, Build!, of which SD Entertainment completed animation production.

Following the series' conclusion, HIT Entertainment was purchased by US toy company Mattel for $680 million. In October 2014, the company announced a new series that would feature changes in the setting, casting and character designs. The revival aired on Channel 5's Milkshake! for three series from 2015–2018. An animated theatrical movie adaptation of the series was announced in January 2024; it will be produced by Jennifer Lopez's Nuyorican Productions and star Anthony Ramos as the voice of Bob.

== Premise ==
In each episode, Bob and his group help with renovations, construction, and repairs and with other projects as needed. They are also joined by work colleague Wendy, alongside their neighbours and friends. The action is set in Bobsville; with Sunflower Valley and Fixham Harbour introduced in later seasons.

The show emphasises conflict resolution, co-operation, socialisation, and various learning skills. Bob's catchphrase is "Can we fix it?", to which the other characters respond by saying "Yes, we can!" This phrase is also the title of the show's theme song, which was a million-selling number one hit in the UK.

== Episodes ==
Series	Episodes	Originally released		
Series	Episodes	First released	Last released	Network
Original series
1	13	12 April 1999	2 August 1999	CBBC
2	13	11 October 1999	28 December 1999	CBBC
3	13	1 September 2000	19 September 2000	CBBC
4	13	1 February 2001	19 February 2001	CBBC
5	13	1 April 2002	13 April 2002	CBeebies
6	13	2 September 2002	14 September 2002	CBeebies
7	13	3 February 2003	20 February 2003	CBeebies
8	13	1 September 2003	24 November 2003	CBeebies
9	13	3 April 2004	20 December 2004	CBeebies
Project: Build It
10	15	2 May 2005	20 May 2005	CBeebies
11	12	1 August 2005	16 August 2005	CBeebies
12	14	31 July 2006	17 August 2006	CBeebies
13	12	18 August 2006	4 September 2006	CBeebies
14	12	3 September 2007	18 September 2007	CBeebies
15	15	19 September 2007	9 October 2007	CBeebies
16	13	5 August 2008	26 August 2008	CBeebies
Ready, Steady, Build!
17	20	12 April 2010	28 May 2010	CBeebies
Mini 1	6	25 October 2010		DVD
18	8	26 September 2011	5 October 2011	CBeebies
Mini 2	6	31 December 2011		DVD

=== Project: Build It ===
In May 2005, a sort of spin-off series was released titled Bob the Builder: Project: Build It. Bob hears of a contest to build a new community in a remote area called Sunflower Valley, outside of Bobsville. He moves from Bobsville (supposedly temporarily) with Wendy and the machines and builds a new Yard there. Bob convinces his father, Robert, to come out of retirement and take over the Bobsville building business. It is unknown whether Bob returned to Bobsville in the stop-motion series or not after this spin-off series was finished.

For the US version of the Project: Build It series, different actors were found to do the voices for many of the human characters, including casting Greg Proops as the new voice of Bob, and Rob Rackstraw, who played the original voices of Scoop, Muck and Travis, to be the voices of Spud the Scarecrow and Mr. Bentley for both the UK and the US. The show also added recycling and being environmentally friendly to its lessons, emphasising the phrase "Reduce, Reuse, Recycle."

This series premiered on 2 May 2005 in the United Kingdom and 3 September of the same year in the United States, and was the first series made in HD 1080p.

=== Ready, Steady, Build! ===
The third spin-off was titled Bob the Builder: Ready, Steady, Build! It was created by Keith Chapman and Mallory Lewis. The group, now joined by newcomer Scratch are now residing in the town of Fixham Harbour (which is very similar to Bobsville, and is even implied to be Bobsville in several episodes), deal with construction and other building tasks around the area. Unlike the previous series, Ready, Steady, Build! is animated in full CGI animation, which allows for larger and more elaborate construction projects that would be too large or expensive for the model sets of the stop-motion series, though it still retains the theme song.

== Characters and voice actors ==
Bob the Builder, the titular character, in his design used for the original series

Voice actors who have contributed to the original British version include Neil Morrissey, Rob Rackstraw, Kate Harbour, Rupert Degas, Colin McFarlane, Maria Darling, Emma Tate, Richard Briers, and June Whitfield.

Celebrities who have provided voices for the series (usually for one-off specials) include John Motson, Sue Barker, Kerry Fox, Ulrika Jonsson, Alison Steadman, Stephen Tompkinson, Elton John, Noddy Holder, and Chris Evans (Bobsville's resident rock star Lennie Lazenby).

== International broadcasts ==
Bob the Builder is shown in more than thirty countries, and versions are available in English, French, Spanish, Serbian, Swedish, Slovenian, German, Italian, Dutch, Hebrew, Hindi, and Croatian, among other languages. It was shown on CBeebies on BBC television in the UK. It has also aired on Nick Jr. in the UK.

The North American version of the show uses the original British footage and script, but replaces the voices with American accents and verbiage; for example, "wrench" is used instead of "spanner", owing to the former's use in North America. The original North American voice of Bob (and Farmer Pickles/Mr. Beasley/Mr. Sabatini) was William Dufris; he was replaced with comedian Greg Proops. More recently, Bob's US voice has been provided by Marc Silk, an English voice actor from Birmingham. In the United States, the series first aired on the Nick Jr. block from 2001 to 2004 before moving to PBS Kids for a long run from 1 January 2005 through 6 November 2015, after which it was replaced with the 2015 reboot. Qubo also started airing the show from 7 October 2020 through 28 February 2021 due to the channel's closure, but with the original British English dub. The classic series and reboot was made available to stream on Paramount+ and Peacock, and the classic series was available for free on Pluto TV, Tubi, and The Roku Channel. However, they are no longer available.

== Discography ==
=== Studio albums ===
Title	Album details	Peak chart positions				Certifications (sales threshold)
Title	Album details	UK	AUS	IRE	NZ	Certifications (sales threshold)
Bob the Builder: The Album	Release date: 3 October 2001; Label: BBC; Formats: CD	4	1	59	32	BPI: Gold; ARIA: 2× Platinum
Never Mind the Breeze Blocks	Release date: 8 December 2008; Label: Universal Music Group; Formats: CD, music download	87	—	—	—	
"—" denotes releases that did not chart

=== Singles ===
Year	Title	Peak chart positions			Certifications (sales threshold)	Album
Year	Title	UK	AUS	IRE	Certifications (sales threshold)	Album
2000	"Can We Fix It?"	1	1	3	BPI: Gold; ARIA: 2× Platinum	Bob the Builder: The Album
2001	"Mambo No. 5"	1	2	4	BPI: Gold; ARIA: Platinum	Bob the Builder: The Album
2008	"Big Fish Little Fish"	81	—	—		Never Mind the Breeze Blocks
"—" denotes releases that did not chart

== Impact ==
Bob the Builder was nominated in the BAFTA "Pre-school animation" category from 1999 to 2009, and won the "Children's Animation" category in 2003 for the special episode "A Christmas to Remember". Of the show's success, Sarah Ball said:

I think diggers and dumpers fascinate kids in the same way that they are drawn to dinosaurs. They both have a timeless appeal. The technique of stop motion is very tangible - the characters look like you can just pick them up and play with them. It's a safe, lovely, bright, colourful world, which is very appealing. Curtis Jobling did a fantastic job designing the show - it's very simple and stylized but has such charm.

— Interview with Sarah Ball, Gurgle.com

Bob the Builder has been parodied by Robot Chicken in the episode "More Blood, More Chocolate", and by Comedy Inc. as Bodgy Builder.

Bob has also been parodied on Cartoon Network's MAD on several occasions. In the episode "S'UP / Mouse M.D.", Bob is seen with a smashed thumb and asks "Can we fix it?" In another episode, Bob encounters the title character of Handy Manny, whom he tells to "Stop copying my show!"

A New Yorker cartoon shows a parent in a toy store asking for toys depicting Alex the Architect, supposedly a white-collar equivalent to Bob the Builder.

Some have complained about technical errors and lack of proper safety practices in the programme, especially the absence of protective eyewear. However, in later episodes, Bob is seen using safety glasses.

== Video games ==
Various video game publishers released Bob the Builder video games throughout the 2000s:

- Fix It Fun! (Game Boy Color, NTSC/PAL) - 2000
- Can We Fix It? (PC, PS1, NTSC/PAL) - 2001
- Bob Builds a Park (PC, NTSC/PAL) - 2002
- Bob's Castle Adventure (PC, NTSC/PAL) - 2003
- Project: Build It (PS2, PAL only) - 2005
- Bob the Builder: Festival of Fun (PS2, Wii, Nintendo DS, PAL only) - 2007
- Bob the Builder: Can-Do-Zoo (PC, NTSC/PAL) - 2008

In the United States, Bob the Builder: Can We Fix It?'s computer version sold 350,000 copies and earned $6.1 million by August 2006, after its release in August 2001. It was the country's 50th best-selling computer game between January 2000 and August 2006. Combined sales of all Bob the Builder computer games released between January 2000 and August 2006 had reached 520,000 units in the United States by the latter date.
