= List of Bob the Builder episodes =

Bob the Builder is a British animated children's television series created by Keith Chapman for HIT Entertainment. The series first aired on 12 April 1999 in the UK on CBBC before moving to CBeebies for all subsequent series from the fifth series onwards. In the US, the series was picked up by Nick Jr. in April 2000 and it first aired there on 13 January 2001 before being picked up by PBS Kids in 2004, with all subsequent series airing therefrom the seventh series onwards.

The series finale aired on 31 December 2011 as a mini series titled The Big Dino Dig, which was released on 14 June 2011 and ended the original series after 18 series.

== Series overview ==
| Series | Episodes | Originally released | | |
| Series | Episodes | First released | Last released | Network |
|---|---|---|---|---|
Original series
| 1 | 13 | 12 April 1999 | 2 August 1999 | CBBC |
| 2 | 13 | 11 October 1999 | 28 December 1999 | CBBC |
| 3 | 13 | 1 September 2000 | 19 September 2000 | CBBC |
| 4 | 13 | 1 February 2001 | 19 February 2001 | CBBC |
| 5 | 13 | 1 April 2002 | 13 April 2002 | CBeebies |
| 6 | 13 | 2 September 2002 | 14 September 2002 | CBeebies |
| 7 | 13 | 3 February 2003 | 20 February 2003 | CBeebies |
| 8 | 13 | 1 September 2003 | 24 November 2003 | CBeebies |
| 9 | 13 | 3 April 2004 | 20 December 2004 | CBeebies |
Project: Build It
| 10 | 15 | 2 May 2005 | 20 May 2005 | CBeebies |
| 11 | 12 | 1 August 2005 | 16 August 2005 | CBeebies |
| 12 | 14 | 31 July 2006 | 17 August 2006 | CBeebies |
| 13 | 12 | 18 August 2006 | 4 September 2006 | CBeebies |
| 14 | 12 | 3 September 2007 | 18 September 2007 | CBeebies |
| 15 | 15 | 19 September 2007 | 9 October 2007 | CBeebies |
| 16 | 13 | 5 August 2008 | 26 August 2008 | CBeebies |
Ready, Steady, Build!
| 17 | 20 | 12 April 2010 | 28 May 2010 | CBeebies |
| Mini 1 | 6 | 25 October 2010 | | DVD |
| 18 | 8 | 26 September 2011 | 5 October 2011 | CBeebies |
| Mini 2 | 6 | 31 December 2011 | | DVD |

== Original series (1999–2004) ==
=== Series 1 (1999) ===
| No. overall | No. in series | Title (Note: Top: British English title Bottom: American English title) | Written by | BBC airdate (top) Nick Jr. airdate (bottom) | Prod. code | Half-Hour code |
|---|---|---|---|---|---|---|
| 1 | 1 | "Scoop Saves the Day" | Diane Redmond | 12 April 1999 22 January 2001 | 1-03 | 101A (Note: Production code for the Nick Jr./Treehouse TV blocks.) 304B (Note: Production code for the PBS blocks.) |
A terrible thunderstorm causes havoc in Bobsville: roads are blocked, trees and telegraph lines are down, pipes are broken, and fences are destroyed. Bob and his team of machines repair the damage that the storm left behind. Along the way, Pilchard, Bob's pet cat gets stuck in a broken tree, hanging over the middle of a duck pond.
| 2 | 2 | "Travis Paints the Town" | Chris Trengove | 19 April 1999 25 January 2001 | 1-09 | 107A 307A |
Bob is called away from a job, leaving Roley the roller and Travis Tractor alone with the line marking machine. This gives a naughty scarecrow, Spud, his chance to sabotage Travis.
| 3 | 3 | "Bob Saves the Hedgehogs Bob Saves the Porcupines" | Chris Trengove | 26 April 1999 16 January 2001 | 1-06 | 103A 306B |
Bob and his gang help a family of hedgehogs to get across a busy road. But Roley never pays attention to where he is going while the hedgehogs cross an unpaved road the machines have to work on. Lofty the crane becomes scared of them and mistakes them for mice, but later is calm when he transports them back to their burrow that Bob and the team have been constructing.
| 4 | 4 | "Pilchard in a Pickle" | Chris Trengove | 10 May 1999 22 January 2001 | 1-01 | 101B 302B |
Pilchard goes missing, so Wendy tries to find her, unaware that she is napping in one of the pipes Travis is transporting for Bob and the team to lay.
| 5 | 5 | "Muck Gets Stuck" | Chris Trengove | 17 May 1999 23 January 2001 | 1-02 | 102A 312A |
Muck the dump shovel gets stuck in a dark tunnel, so Bob and the others struggle to get him out.
| 6 | 6 | "Wendy's Busy Day" | Diane Redmond | 24 May 1999 23 January 2001 | 1-05 | 102B 309A |
Bob has caught a cold so Wendy steps in and takes over. She then takes Muck, Roley and Dizzy the cement mixer to finish the road, but when Dizzy gets stuck in the cement whilst playing football, Lofty is brought in to rescue her.
| 7 | 7 | "Bob's Bugle" | Jimmy Hibbert | 7 June 1999 15 January 2001 | 1-07 | 106B 308A |
Bob makes himself a trumpet out of some left-over bits of piping. None of the machines have the heart to tell him how awful it sounds, except Roley, who actually likes the way it sounds and has no complaints.
| 8 | 8 | "Buffalo Bob" | Chris Trengrove | 14 June 1999 15 January 2001 (Nick Jr.; Block 106) 13 January 2001 (Nickelodeon; Block 118) | 1-04 | 106A 118B (Note: Production code for an exclusive Nick Jr. block) 313B |
Bob takes part of in a line-dancing competition. When his dancing partner, Mavis, calls and tells him she has sprained her ankle at the gym and cannot compete, Wendy offers to take her place as Bob's partner. The machines also take part in their own line-dancing.
| 9 | 9 | "Travis and Scoop's Race Day" | Ross Hastings | 5 July 1999 (Note: This episode was first released on the Buffalo Bob and Other Stories VHS on 21 June 1999.) 25 January 2001 | 1-10 | 107B 301B |
Spud challenges Scoop and Travis to a race to see which of them is faster than the other. Along the way, Spud tries to trick Scoop by throwing obstacles at him in order to make Travis win instead, but in the end Scoop is declared the champion.
| 10 | 10 | "Bob's Birthday" | Diane Redmond | 12 July 1999 19 January 2001 | 1-08 | 104A 305A |
The gang prepares a special surprise for Bob's Birthday. Muck, Roley and Dizzy make a "Concrete Cake" out of an old tyre for Bob to commemorate ten jobs, while Bob, Scoop and Lofty are at Farmer Pickles' farm.
| 11 | 11 | "Naughty Spud" | Jimmy Hibbert | 19 July 1999 5 June 2001 | 1-11 | 116B 303B |
Spud takes Bob's ladder to reach apples from a tree but inadvertently strands him on the roof of Travis' shed when he forgets to bring it back. After Muck breaks the spare ladder trying to take it to Bob, Scoop eventually comes to his rescue.
| 12 | 12 | "Scary Spud" | Sarah Ball | 26 July 1999 16 January 2001 | 1-12 | 103B 310B |
Spud is anxious that he may no longer be scary, and to make matters worse, after he attempts to do karate, he loses his nose. So Muck, Dizzy and Travis must investigate along with Spud to help him get his nose back.
| 13 | 13 | "Bob's Barnraising" | Diane Redmond | 2 August 1999 5 June 2001 (Note: This episode was first released on the Can We Fix It? VHS on 22 May 2001.) | 1-13 | 116A 311A |
The team needs to finish constructing Farmer Pickles' barn and get the bales into it before the rain hits. Travis and Muck haul the harvest into the shed, while Scoop and Lofty hold the walls in the barn.

=== Series 2 (1999) ===
| No. overall | No. in series | Title | Written by | BBC airdate (top) Nick Jr. airdate (bottom) | Prod. code | Half-Hour code |
|---|---|---|---|---|---|---|
| 14 | 1 | "Spud the Spanner Spud the Superwrench" (Note: Also titled "Spud the Super-Wrench" for Nick Jr./Treehouse TV airings.) | Ben Randall | 11 October 1999 30 January 2001 | 2-16 | 111A 306A |
Spud is bored of his old scarecrow business, so he mischievously takes Bob's toolbox to try to reinvent himself as a repairman, but his efforts only result in disrepair.
| 15 | 2 | "Wallpaper Wendy" | Jimmy Hibbert | 18 October 1999 26 November 2001 | 2-20 | 124A 313A |
Bob decorates Mrs. Broadbent's new apartment, but as he has never decorated before, he ends up making a complete disaster.
| 16 | 3 | "Runaway Roley" | Jimmy Hibbert | 25 October 1999 (Note: This episode was first released on the Naughty Spud and Other Stories VHS on 27 September 1999.) 31 January 2001 | 2-14 | 113B 303A |
Roley loses his brakes in the morning and sleep-rolls out of the yard, causing destruction everywhere. Bob, Wendy and the other machines have to guide Roley back to the yard without waking him up.
| 17 | 4 | "Bob's Big Surprise" | Chris Trengove | 1 November 1999 19 January 2001 | 2-15 | 104B 301A |
While Wendy is visiting her sister, Bob and the team decide to surprise her by giving her garden a makeover. However, Mrs. Potts cannot look after the office as she is sick, so Bob leaves Pilchard alone in the office, but Pilchard ends up making a huge mess due to being constantly annoyed by the phone ringing and the answering machine messages.
| 18 | 5 | "Dizzy's Statues" | Diane Redmond | 8 November 1999 18 January 2001 | 2-21 | 112A 302A |
Bob has to put up bollards around the town hall and put up Mrs. Potts' garden statues at the same time. Although Dizzy tries to help, she gets very mixed up.
| 19 | 6 | "Lofty to the Rescue" | Chris Trengove | 15 November 1999 31 January 2001 | 2-18 | 113A 309B |
Lofty is unsure of going over the bridge because of his fear of heights. Spud picks on Lofty to the point of making him cry, but when Spud falls off the bridge and into a tree while taunting everybody passing by, it’s up to Lofty to overcome his fears and rescue him.
| 20 | 7 | "Wendy's Big Match Wendy's Big Game" | Simon Jowett | 22 November 1999 (Note: This episode was first released on the Bob's White Christmas and Other Stories VHS on 15 November 1999.) 17 January 2001 | 2-23 | 117A 304A |
Bob is preparing for a "Brightest Building Yard" competition, with Muck’s help. Wendy is building a football field, but when Spud kicks a ball while she is using the line-making machine, it makes a mess, forcing him to clean it up.
| 21 | 8 | "Tea Set Travis" | Ben Randall | 29 November 1999 26 January 2001 | 2-22 | 108B 305B |
As Bob and the gang are preparing for recycling, Farmer Pickles tells Travis to look after his old tea set, but when Spud and Travis are not around, they forget about the tea set and the gang almost recycles it.
| 22 | 9 | "Dizzy's Birdwatch" | Simon Jowett | 6 December 1999 7 June 2001 | 2-19 | 120B 312B |
Dizzy is in charge of a birds' nest. Later, she sees the hatchlings emerge and learn to fly.
| 23 | 10 | "Clocktower Bob" | Chris Trengove | 13 December 1999 12 November 2001 (Note: This episode was first released on the To the Rescue! VHS on 22 May 2001.) | 2-24 | 122A 310A |
Bob ends up stranded on a broken clock tower when Lofty gets scared by a bat and mistakenly knocks the ladder down. All the while, Muck tells Dizzy a joke, but storms off crossly when Scoop asks him to let Dizzy get on with her mixing. That night, he bumps into Lofty just as Scoop and Wendy find both machines so they can rescue Bob.
| 24 | 11 | "Wendy's Tennis Court Wendy's Tennis Match" ("The Big Game" only) | Diane Redmond | 20 December 1999 17 January 2001 | 2-25 | 117B 311B |
Wendy is supervising the construction of a new tennis court. When Travis and Spud try to put the net up, Spud finds it too heavy and falls into the wet cement, creating some issues.
| 25 | 12 | "Bob's White Christmas" | Jimmy Hibbert | 27 December 1999 10 December 2001 (Christmas special) (Note: This episode was first released on the Bob's White Christmas VHS on 16 October 2001.) | 2--17 | 201A 118B (Note: Production code for a Treehouse TV block) 307B |
Bob will dress up as Father Christmas for the local school carol concert, led by the schoolteacher, Mrs. Percival, but loses time when Farmer Pickles gets snowed in. Scoop uses his snowplough to clear the roads while Muck and Travis clear Farmer Pickles' driveway.
| 26 | 13 | "Pilchard Goes Fishing" | Jimmy Hibbert | 28 December 1999 24 January 2001 | 2--26 | 105B 308B |
Wendy is cleaning Bob's fish tank, but when Muck is coming for more cement, he crashes into the lean-to garage. When Wendy gets distracted while trying to fix it, Pilchard intends to eat up Bob's goldfish, Finn.

=== Series 3 (2000) ===
| No. overall | No. in series | Title | Written by | BBC airdate (top) Nick Jr. airdate (bottom) | Prod. code | Half-Hour code |
|---|---|---|---|---|---|---|
| 27 | 1 | "Bob's Boots" | Ben Randall | 1 September 2000 (Note: This episode was first released on the Pilchard's Breakfast and Other Stories VHS on 10 April 2000.) 15 January 2001 | 3-27 | 110A |
Bob gets some new boots and decides to wear them to work. Spud, on the other hand, challenges Bird (whom is Roley’s sidekick) to a race to Bob's Building Yard as "the crow flies".
| 28 | 2 | "Mucky Muck" | Sarah Ball | 4 September 2000 (Note: This episode was first released on the Mucky Muck and Other Stories VHS on 20 March 2000.) 26 November 2001 | 3-28 | 124B |
Bob tries to wash down Scoop and Muck, and Travis gets stuck in the mud. Bob, Muck and Dizzy come to his rescue.
| 29 | 3 | "Bob's Day Off" | Ian Carney | 5 September 2000 15 January 2001 | 3-29 | 110B |
Bob takes a day off so he can photograph the rare Blue-Crested Warbler. But when his computer breaks down, Wendy needs him back for some urgent jobs.
| 30 | 4 | "Magnetic Lofty" | Chris Trengove | 6 September 2000 26 January 2001 | 3-30 | 108A |
Wendy is turning an old railway line into a bicycle path and Bob is turning an old rubbish dump into a park. But while Lofty is removing the rails using a magnet, he has to retrieve Mr. Bentley's pen in the process.
| 31 | 5 | "Roley's Tortoise" | Diane Redmond | 7 September 2000 7 June 2001 | 3-31 | 120A |
While building a bus stop, Roley almost runs over a tortoise, whom he rescues and names “Timmy.” For a plot twist, Dizzy reveals its name is “Tommy” whom he belongs to Mrs. Potts, but while Bob takes some cabbages from Travis' trailer, Tommy sneaks on board.
| 32 | 6 | "Special Delivery Spud" | Simon Jowett | 8 September 2000 8 June 2001 | 3-32 | 121A |
Bob and Wendy have ordered new saws, but Mr. Dixon's van breaks down, delaying his deliveries. Spud is determined to prove he can do any job without causing trouble, so he and Travis deliver the parcels without Mr. Dixon's knowledge, but, because Spud cannot read, he delivers everything to the wrong people.
| 33 | 7 | "Pilchard's Breakfast" | Jimmy Hibbert | 11 September 2000 24 January 2001 | 3-33 | 105A |
Bob's gang are building Mr. Beasley's new conservatory, but Bob forgets about feeding Pilchard her breakfast, forcing her to fend for herself and find someone to feed her.
| 34 | 8 | "Scoop's in Charge" | Jimmy Hibbert | 12 September 2000 12 November 2001 | 3-34 | 122B |
Bob and Wendy are attending lunch at the Bobsville town hall, so they leave Scoop in charge of building the Mayor's garage. But while Mr. Bentley inspects the work, Scoop accidentally crushes his gold watch by mistake.
| 35 | 9 | "Muck's Sleep-Over" | Ben Randall | 13 September 2000 18 January 2001 | 3-35 | 112B |
While Bob's gang is working on a tunnel overnight, Muck is excited when he stays at the farm with Travis, but he gets scared of the dark and the scary noises Spud is making and goes missing. When investigating the sound of an owl, Both Pilchard and Spud go missing too. The machines need to find the trio before they get lost.
| 36 | 10 | "Trailer Travis Travis' Trailer"("Tool Power!" only) | Ben Randall | 14 September 2000 30 January 2001 | 3-36 | 111B |
Travis is delivering a load of gravel, while Scoop helps. However, Spud unhooks the trailer to give Travis a rest and it rolls away, unaware that he nearly causes a serious traffic accident.
| 37 | 11 | "Spud and Squawk" | Teddy Kempner and Andy Seacombe | 15 September 2000 29 January 2001 | 3-37 | 109B |
Bob, Wendy and the machines are building a new car park. Meanwhile, Spud is trying to shake off a persistent crow that is following him everywhere.
| 38 | 12 | "Scoop Has Some Fun" | Chris Trengove | 18 September 2000 29 January 2001 | 3-38 | 109A |
Spud blackmails Scoop to help him play some tricks, including attempts to hypnotise Travis with a moving hay bale to make him think it's magic, but Spud soon goes too far when he frightens Lofty so much that he falls onto his side after crashing into a pile of logs.
| 39 | 13 | "Dizzy's Crazy Paving" | Diane Redmond | 19 September 2000 (Note: This episode was first released on the Trailer Travis and Other Stories VHS on 18 September 2000.) 13 January 2001 | 3-39 | 118A |
While the machines are building a new path for Mrs. Potts, she does not want Roley to work on it because she thinks he will crush all the flowerbeds. Roley decides to supervise Wendy with the hand-roller. But when Roley takes Wendy to help Bob with weatherproofing paint, Muck accidentally drops the flagstones while debating with Dizzy about where to put them, and they break, which prompts Dizzy a bright idea.

=== Series 4 (2001) ===
| No. overall | No. in series | Title | Written by | BBC airdate (top) Nick Jr. airdate (bottom) | Prod. code | Half-Hour code |
|---|---|---|---|---|---|---|
| 40 | 1 | "Scoop's Stegosaurus" | Jimmy Hibbert | 1 February 2001 4 June 2001 | 4-40 | 119A |
Bob and Scoop discover some old bones in a ditch at Farmer Pickles' field. While Bob is out at the museum, Spud persuades Scoop to see some bigger bones that he claims to have found. Mr. Ellis thinks that a stegosaurus skeleton was found, but some of its bones have gone missing. Could someone have taken them?
| 41 | 2 | "Sneezing Scoop" | Ruth Estevez | 2 February 2001 8 June 2001 | 4-41 | 121B |
While some tyres are being dropped off for Farmer Pickles and Travis, Scoop starts sneezing, which prompts Bob he has hay-fever. He sends Scoop back to the yard, but he still sneezes. Bob lets Spud figure out what is causing Scoop to sneeze, and the answer ends up being hay and flowers.
| 42 | 3 | "Roley's Animal Rescue Roley's Sleepy Friend" | Chris Trengove | 5 February 2001 (Note: This episode was first released on the Scarecrow Dizzy and Other Stories on 30 October 2000.) 1 February 2001 | 4-42 | 114A |
Bob discovers a hedgehog asleep in Farmer Pickles' cottage and Scoop takes it back to the yard, while Roley looks after it. But when Farmer Pickles arrives to see Wendy, Scruffty jumps out of Travis' trailer and he and Pilchard chase each other which makes Roley worried that it might wake the hedgehog.
| 43 | 4 | "Scarecrow Dizzy" | James Henry | 6 February 2001 1 February 2001 | 4-43 | 114B |
Bob and Wendy are working on painting Farmer Pickles' farmhouse with Dizzy guarding the wet cement. But when Spud tries to paint it, he makes a big mess.
| 44 | 5 | "One Shot Wendy Wendy Plays Golf" ("Can We Fix It?" & Half Hour airings only) | Simon Jowett and Ben Randall | 7 February 2001 7 March 2002 | 4-44 | 125B |
Bob and the gang are building a crazy golf course. Wendy discovers that she has the instructions for the windmill that Bob is building, yet when she phones him, he says he doesn't need them.
| 45 | 6 | "Spud Lends a Hand" | Ian Carney | 8 February 2001 7 March 2002 | 4-45 | 125A |
A rainwater tank is being put up next to Farmer Pickles' barn. While Bob is not around, Spud makes Lofty lift the tank into place. But instead of landing properly, it rolls down a hill and smashes a wooden boat for Wendy's nephew.
| 46 | 7 | "Bob and the Bandstand" | Teddy Kempner and Andy Secombe | 9 February 2001 14 March 2002 | 4-46 | 126B |
Bob's gang are preparing Farmer Pickles' bandstand. But then the sheet music falls out of Travis' trailer and Spud starts making paper aeroplanes with it.
| 47 | 8 | "Farmer Pickles' Pigpen" | Jimmy Hibbert | 12 February 2001 19 November 2001 (Note: This episode was first released on the Pets in a Pickle VHS on 7 August 2001.). | 4-47 | 123B |
Farmer Pickles is phoning Bob to build a doghouse for Scruffty, but he accidentally drops the phone. At the same time, Mrs. Percival phones Farmer Pickles to look after a couple of guinea pigs over the school holiday. After Wendy answers the message, she sends the phone off with Scoop, but then he passes it onto Spud and Travis until Farmer Pickles is puzzled to hear about the arrival of some unordered "mini-pigs" and, has no pigpen.
| 48 | 9 | "Bob on the Run" | Chris Trengove | 13 February 2001 (Note: This episode was first released on the Children's Favorites 2 VHS on 12 February 2001.) 6 June 2001 | 4-48 | 115A |
Mrs. Percival is raising money for a new clubhouse. Bob sponsors it with a Runathon and the machines sponsor it by demolishing the old pavilion.
| 49 | 10 | "Forget-Me-Knot Bob" | Ben Randall | 14 February 2001 19 November 2001 | 4-49 | 123A |
Bob's personal organiser (which gives details of all of his jobs) breaks down. He tries to remind himself by tying knots in his handkerchief, but gets them mixed up.
| 50 | 11 | "Roley and the Rock Star" | Simon Jowett | 15 February 2001 14 March 2002 | 4-50 | 126A |
Roley is excited when Bob builds a pond in his favourite rock star's garden.
| 51 | 12 | "Scruffty the Detective" | Sarah Ball | 16 February 2001 4 June 2001 | 4-51 | 119B |
A time capsule is being built for Mr. Ellis and will be buried outside the museum. However, Spud mistakes it for a treasure chest and almost buries it in the wrong place, but Scruffty catches him just in time.
| 52 | 13 | "Watercolour Wendy Watercolor Wendy" (Note: American English only removes the letter U from the title.) (Half Hour airings only) | Ian Carney | 19 February 2001 6 June 2001 | 4-52 | 115B |
Wendy is on her day off doing some watercolour painting, but Scruffty buries her phone.

=== Series 5 (2002) ===
| No. overall | No. in series | Title | Written by | CBeebies airdate (top) Nick Jr. airdate (bottom) | Prod. code | Half-Hour code |
|---|---|---|---|---|---|---|
| 53 | 1 | "Scruffty's Big Dig" | Diane Redmond | 1 April 2002 (Note: This episode was first released on the Skateboard Spud and Other Stories VHS on 17 September 2001.) 20 March 2002 | 5-53 | 202B |
Bob, Wendy and the Machines are going to Mrs. Broadbent's House that has a big hole in the wall, but Scrufty gets stuck in a rabbit hole, who gets out with Lofty’s help.
| 54 | 2 | "Inspector Spud" | Simon Jowett | 2 April 2002 (Note: This episode was first released on the Children's Favorites 3 VHS on 30 July 2001.) 15 October 2002 | 5-54 | 206A |
Mr. Bentley inspects a pipe but he gets soaked. Spud tries to take over, but he has no qualifications.
| 55 | 3 | "Cock-a-Doodle Spud" | Diane Redmond | 3 April 2002 16 October 2002 | 5-55 | 207A |
Farmer Pickles' hen has abandoned her eggs, so Bob is building a hen coop, while Spud decides to look after the chicks.
| 56 | 4 | "Wendy's Surprise Party" | Ruth Estevez | 4 April 2002 12 April 2002 | 5-56 | 203B |
Wendy is inviting the whole town for a barbecue party for her sister, Jenny. But the machines have just laid a garden path and they are too tired to come.
| 57 | 5 | "Skateboard Spud" | Ross Hastings | 5 April 2002 11 October 2002 | 5-57 | 205B |
Using an old ironing board, Spud makes a skateboard and rides it all over town. Bob has just put up some traffic calming measures. When Spud comes across Bob, Dizzy, Roley and Scoop, he crashes into the dumpster.
| 58 | 6 | "Muck's Monster" | Ben Randall | 6 April 2002 10 October 2002 (Halloween special) | 5-58 | 204B |
Wendy, Muck and Dizzy are clearing a blocked drain. Muck gets spooked by gurgling noises and he is convinced it is a monster. Meanwhile, Spud and Lofty play a game of chess.
| 59 | 7 | "Spud the Dragon" | Ian Carney | 7 April 2002 (Note: This episode was first released on Pilchard Steals the Show and Other Stories VHS on 11 February 2002.) 15 October 2002 | 5-59 | 206B |
Mrs. Percival is preparing costumes for the school play. Spud borrows the dragon costume and pretends to be a magic dragon when he sees Muck. Meanwhile, Bob and Wendy are sorting out Mrs. Potts' attic.
| 60 | 8 | "Pilchard Steals the Show" | Jimmy Hibbert | 8 April 2002 20 March 2002 | 5-60 | 202A |
Scoop notices that Farmer Pickles has entered Scruffty into the dog show, which determines him to also enter Pilchard, even though she is a cat.
| 61 | 9 | "Bob's Hide Bob's Bird Blind" (Half Hour airings only) | James Henry | 9 April 2002 10 October 2002 (Halloween special) | 5-61 | 204A |
Bob's gang are making a bird hide at the nature reserve and also want to get a glimpse of the rare Grebe Warbler. But Spud appears instead of dressed like a bird.
| 62 | 10 | "Bob's Auntie" | Jimmy Hibbert | 10 April 2002 12 April 2002 | 5-62 | 203A |
Bob believes his Auntie Dora is coming to visit and she is a stickler for tidiness. Already the yard is in a complete mess and the machines try to clean it up, but they only make it worse.
| 63 | 11 | "Bob and the Big Freeze" | Simon Jowett | 11 April 2002 10 December 2001 | 5-63 | 201B |
Scoop and Wendy try to clear the roads, but they bumped into the hedgehog crossing. Spud tries to skate on the frozen duck pond, but the ice is not thick enough. Bob sends Dizzy and Lofty out to rescue him.
| 64 | 12 | "Clumsy Roley Roll on Roley" (Half Hour airings only) | Ian Carney | 12 April 2002 11 October 2002 | 5-64 | 205A |
Roley almost crushes Bob's toolbox. This causes anxiety from him to think he is always clumsy. This always makes him more accident-prone.
| 65 | 13 | "Eskimo Bob Bob of the North" | Chris Trengove | 13 April 2002 10 December 2001 (Christmas special) | 5-65 | 201C |
A snowstorm has hit Bobsville, and Farmer Pickles has a huge hole in his roof. Wendy, along with her sister, Jenny, goes to fix it while Bob, Scoop, and Muck clear the roads. Spud accidentally destroys Scruffty's kennel while trying on Wendy's skis, so Jenny builds an igloo for Scruffty.

=== Series 6 (2002) ===
| No. overall | No. in series | Title | Written by | CBeebies airdate (top) Nick Jr. airdate (bottom) | Prod. code | Half-Hour code |
|---|---|---|---|---|---|---|
| 66 | 1 | "Bob's Pizza" | Ian Carney | 2 September 2002 24 November 2003 | 6-67 | 212B |
Bob and Scoop help Mr. Sabatini by delivering pizzas for him.
| 67 | 2 | "Bob's Metal Detector" | Ian Carney | 3 September 2002 17 October 2002 | 6-66 | 210B |
Bob buys a metal detector to help him look for and fix Farmer Pickles' broken water pipe. Afterwards, Bob and Muck go treasure hunting in Farmer Pickles' field, but all they manage to find is half a bike and the main water pipe, which they accidentally crack.
| 68 | 3 | "Mr. Beasley's DIY Disaster Mr. Beasley's Vegetable Patch" (Note: Also titled "Mr. Beasley's Do-it-Yourself Disaster" on Dig! Lift! Haul!) | Chris Trengove | 4 September 2002 8 October 2002 | 6-69 | 213A |
Mr. Beasley asks Bob to build him a new tool shed for his garden, but Bob is delayed by an urgent roof repair at the post office. Mr. Beasley tries building the shed himself, but it becomes a disaster when he doesn't put the support in properly.
| 69 | 4 | "Wendy's Removal Service Wendy's Moving Company" | Simon Jowett | 5 September 2002 17 October 2002 | 6-68 | 210A |
Wendy starts operating a removal service.
| 70 | 5 | "Lofty and the Rabbits" | Ruth Estevez | 6 September 2002 16 October 2002 | 6-70 | 207B |
Lofty discovers a small family of rabbits.
| 71 | 6 | "Lofty and the Giant Carrot" | Jimmy Hibbert | 7 September 2002 9 October 2002 | 6-71 | 208B |
Lofty gets frightened by a giant carrot, even though it won't get him.
| 72 | 7 | "Bob's Egg and Spoon Race" | Diane Redmond | 8 September 2002 7 October 2002 | 6-72 | 209A |
The town is practicing for an egg and spoon race. Spud has problems trying to keep the egg on the spoon, so he cheats by using some of Bob's putty.
| 73 | 8 | "Trix's Tiles" | Peter Corey | 9 September 2002 24 November 2003 | 6-73 | 212A |
Bob is placing red tiles on a roof, but then a mix-up at JJ's yard causes Wendy to put green tiles on the other side of the roof.
| 74 | 9 | "Mr. Sabatini's Smashing Day Mr. Sabatini Picks Up the Pieces" | Lee Pressman | 10 September 2002 7 October 2002 | 6-74 | 209B |
Mr. Sabatini gets a new football, but he accidentally kicks it through his shop window. J.J. and Bob goes to replace it with a new pane.
| 75 | 10 | "Roley to the Rescue" | James Henry | 11 September 2002 18 October 2002 | 6-75 | 211A |
In an unexpected moment, Bird is trapped for no reason and Roley has to rescue him.
| 76 | 11 | "Spud's Big Splash" | Polly Churchill | 12 September 2002 8 October 2002 | 6-76 | 213B |
Muck's job is to deliver bricks to Mrs. Potts' garden to have the bricks as the base for her new fountain until Spud challenges him to throw bricks in the pond to make a big splash.
| 77 | 12 | "Spud the Musketeer" | Julie Jones | 13 September 2002 18 October 2002 | 6-77 | 211B |
After Spud sees a poster for the school play, he thinks he would like to be a musketeer. He decides to use a fence post as a sword, but when he does, all the sheep escape.
| 78 | 13 | "Wendy's Magic Birthday" | Guy Halifax | 14 September 2002 9 October 2002 | 6-78 | 208A |
It's Wendy's birthday, but she does not want any chaos. Bob organises a magic birthday show for her instead.

=== Series 7 (2003) ===
| No. overall | No. in series | Title | Written by | CBeebies airdate (top) PBS Kids airdate (bottom) | Prod. code | Half-Hour code |
|---|---|---|---|---|---|---|
| 79 | 1 | "Mr. Beasley's New Friends" | Julie Jones | 3 February 2003 19 February 2005 (Animal Habitats) (Note: This episode was first released on the Building Friendships VHS/DVD on 27 May 2003.) | 7-79 | 312B 108C |
Mr. Beasley makes some new friends.
| 80 | 2 | "Spud the Pilot" | Simon Jowett | 4 February 2003 8 January 2005 (Divergent Thinking) (Note: This episode was first released on the Free Bonus Video VHS in 2003.) | 7-80 | 312A 102A |
JJ loses his remote-control aeroplane. Spud finds it and becomes a pilot.
| 81 | 3 | "Trix and the Otters" | Lee Price | 5 February 2003 1 January 2005 (The Environment) | 7-81 | 301A 101A |
Molly sees a family of otters. Trix decides to watch them also, but then they see a big shiny machine. Muck devises a good way to watch them.
| 82 | 4 | "Speedy Skip" | Chris Trengove | 6 February 2003 15 January 2005 (Surprises) (Note: This episode was first released on the Tool Power! VHS/DVD on 30 December 2003.) | 7-82 | 313A 103B |
Skip moves too slow and he causes trouble for the gang. He decides to speed up, and races and speeds around some parts of town.
| 83 | 5 | "Mr. Ellis' Exhibition Mr. Ellis' Art Exhibition" | Diane Redmond | 7 February 2003 26 March 2005 (Problem Solving) (Note: This episode was first released on the Scoop's Favorite Adventures VHS on 27 January 2004 and DVD on 27 July 2004.) | 7-83 | 308A 113B |
Mr. Ellis' new exhibition gets ruined. Everything has to be redone before something gets worse.
| 84 | 6 | "Bob and the Badgers" | Sarah Ball | 10 February 2003 19 February 2005 (Animal Habitats) | 7-84 | 301B 108B |
Farmer Pickles needs a fence built to keep the rabbits off his cabbages. But this also blocks the badgers' path to the stream.
| 85 | 7 | "Bob and the Goalie" | Glenn Dakin | 11 February 2003 22 January 2005 (Self-Esteem) (Note: This episode was first released on the Teamwork! VHS/DVD in 29 July 2003). | 7-85 | 303B 104A |
Bob's gang is building an exercise park which Mr. Dixon's brother, David Dixon, will open. Bob and Spud think they are no good at soccer.
| 86 | 8 | "Dizzy Goes Camping" | Glenn Dakin | 12 February 2003 1 January 2005 (The Environment) (Note: This episode was first released on the Dizzy's Favorite Adventures VHS/DVD on 14 December 2004.) | 7-86 | 310B 101C |
While Wendy goes on holiday with her sister, Bob and the team build a campground near Farmer Pickles' farm. Dizzy wants to know what it is like to camp out, so she and Muck spend the night in a tent. However, Dizzy forgets to shut the gate, and the next morning, Farmer Pickles' sheep get loose in the campground. Dizzy and Muck manage to round up the sheep before Bob and Farmer Pickles return.
| 87 | 9 | "Pilchard's Pets" | Jimmy Hibbert | 13 February 2003 26 February 2005 (Discovery). | 7-87 | 306B 109C |
Pilchard meets some tiny creatures and decides to treat them like pets.
| 88 | 10 | "Snowman Scoop" | James Henry | 14 February 2003 5 March 2005 (Anticipating Outcomes) | 7-88 | 302A 110C |
Scoop wants to enter the snowman competition, but he needs to fix a burst pipe outside Mr. Sabatini's house. The noses for the snowmen start disappearing.
| 89 | 11 | "Lofty's Long Load" | Guy Halifax | 17 February 2003 12 March 2005 (Confidence) | 7-89 | 311A 111B |
Bob is building a through-lounge for Mr. and Mrs. Bentley. Lofty carries the long metal girder. Dizzy and Trix decide to have a race and in the process the girder damages the sides of the bridge.
| 90 | 12 | "Hamish's New Home" | Simon Jowett | 18 February 2003 26 February 2005 (Discovery) | 7-90 | 304A 109A |
Mr. Fothergil discovers he is allergic to parrots, which means Hamish needs a new home.
| 91 | 13 | "Dizzy the Sheepdog" | Diane Redmond | 19 February 2003 5 March 2005 (Anticipating Outcomes) | 7-91 | 302B 110B |
Dizzy helps Farmer Pickles by trying to act like a sheepdog.

=== Series 8 (2003) ===
| No. overall | No. in series | Title | Written by | CBeebies airdate (top) PBS Kids airdate (bottom) | Prod. code | Half-Hour code |
|---|---|---|---|---|---|---|
| 92 | 1 | "Bob the Photographer" | Julie Jones | 1 September 2003 5 February 2005 (Creativity) | 8-92 | 309B 106C |
Bob takes some pictures of the town.
| 93 | 2 | "Mr. Bentley's Trains" | Sarah Ball | 8 September 2003 5 March 2005 (Anticipating Outcomes) | 8-93 | 309A 110A |
While preparing a surprise for Mr. Bentley, Mrs. Bentley accidentally breaks one of his toy trains which she thinks are special to him.
| 94 | 3 | "Wendy's Big Night Out" | Diane Redmond | 15 September 2003 22 January 2005 (Self-Esteem) | 8-94 | 305A 104B |
Wendy goes out for a night on the town.
| 95 | 4 | "Racing Muck" | James Henry | 22 September 2003 26 February 2005 (Discovery) (Note: This episode was first released on the Muck's Favorite Adventures on 27 January 2004 in VHS and 14 December 2004 on DVD.) | 8-95 | 307B 109B |
Muck suddenly goes in a racing mood when he discovers an ancient racecourse while working on foundations.
| 96 | 5 | "Mr. Beasley's Noisy Pipes" | Polly Churchill | 29 September 2003 19 March 2005 (Using Clues) (Note: This episode was first released on the Roley's Favorite Adventures VHS/DVD on 24 July 2004.) | 8-96 | 311B 112A |
Mr. Beasley mistakes the noise of his old pipes for a mole stuck under his floorboards which gives him anxiety.
| 97 | 6 | "Lofty's Jungle Fun" | Julie Jones | 6 October 2003 26 March 2005 (Problem Solving) (Note: This episode was first released on the Lofty's Favorite Adventures VHS/DVD on 14 December 2004.) | 8-97 | 313B 113C |
Molly is painting a picture of jungle animals on the school wall, and Lofty imagines what it would be like to be in the jungle.
| 98 | 7 | "Ballroom Bob" | Simon Jowett | 13 October 2003 12 March 2005 (Confidence) (Note: This episode was first released on the Bob's Favorite Adventures VHS/DVD on 24 July 2004.) | 8-98 | 305B 111A |
Bob has been taking secret salsa dance lessons from Mrs. Percival to practice for the upcoming dance, but he keeps stepping on her feet, making him worry that he won't be able to impress anyone with his moves at the dance. Mr. Bentley tells Bob that the dance is to be moved to Farmer Pickles' field since the town hall is too hot. The team builds an outdoor dance floor and decides to practice dancing, too.
| 99 | 8 | "Molly's Fashion Show" | Glenn Dakin | 20 October 2003 5 February 2005 (Creativity) | 8-99 | 310A 106B |
Molly hosts a fashion show to help raise money for Pam Goody's art centre office.
| 100 | 9 | "Spud and the Doves" | Sarah Ball | 27 October 2003 19 February 2005 (Animal Habitats) | 8-100 | 304B 108A |
Spud gets some trouble with doves.
| 101 | 10 | "First-Aid Molly" | Peter Reeves | 3 November 2003 8 January 2005 (Divergent Thinking) | 8-101 | 308B 102B |
Molly takes a first-aid job at wanting to be a doctor.
| 102 | 11 | "Mr. Bentley: Dog Sitter" | Jimmy Hibbert | 10 November 2003 29 January 2005 (Taking Responsibility) | 8-102 | 307A 105A |
Mr. Bentley is a dog sitting for the Mayor's dog, Timmykins, but he escapes.
| 103 | 12 | "Travis Gets Lucky" | Diane Redmond | 17 November 2003 22 January 2005 (Self-Esteem) | 8-103 | 303A 104C |
Travis is worried when he has to plough a field without Farmer Pickles guiding him. He then finds an old horseshoe and is convinced he will be lucky.
| 104 | 13 | "Scruffty on Guard" | Glenn Dakin | 24 November 2003 19 March 2005 (Using Clues) | 8-104 | 306B 112C |
Scruffty is on guarding duty, but he soon gets distracted.

=== Series 9 (2004) ===
| No. overall | No. in series | Title | Written by | CBeebies airdate (top) PBS Kids airdate (bottom) | Prod. code | Half-Hour code |
|---|---|---|---|---|---|---|
| 105 | 1 | "Scoop the Disco Digger" | Diane Redmond | 3 April 2004 15 January 2005 (Surprises) | 9-105 | 103A |
The team is having a Tropical Beach Party and Dizzy teaches Scoop how to dance.
| 106 | 2 | "Bob the Farmer" | Glenn Dakin | 4 April 2004 12 February 2005 (Helping Others) (Note: This episode was first released on the Yes We Can! VHS/DVD in 18 January 2005.) | 9-106 | 107B |
Bob takes care of Farmer Pickles' farm while he goes to a county fair.
| 107 | 3 | "Lofty the Artist" | James Henry | 10 April 2004 5 February 2005 (Creativity) | 9-108 | 106A |
Wendy decorates the library, and Lofty is so impressed that he decides to paint a picture as well – but he soon finds that being an artist is harder than it looks.
| 108 | 4 | "Spud's Statue" | Jimmy Hibbert | 11 April 2004 29 January 2005 (Taking Responsibility) | 9-109 | 105B |
Spud breaks Molly's statue, so he tries to make a new one out of Bob's building materials only to leave Bob without the wood to fix the pavilion.
| 109 | 5 | "Pilchard and the Field Mice" | Diane Redmond | 17 April 2004 19 March 2005 (Using Clues) | 9-110 | 112B |
Pilchard causes havoc on a job to mend a rotten beam in Mr. Ellis' cottage when she finds some mice living there.
| 110 | 6 | "Trix's Pumpkin Pie" | Diane Redmond | 18 April 2004 29 January 2005 (Taking Responsibility) | 9-111 | 105C |
The team is building a new jungle gym for the school playground. When Trix and Muck collect some wooden poles for the jungle gym from Farmer Pickles, he tells them he needs to deliver a pumpkin to Mr. Sabatini's pizza parlour so he can bake a large pumpkin pie for Farmer Pickles' harvest supper. Trix volunteers to deliver the pumpkin pie after it is finished, but when Bob tells her he needs more wood chips, she asks Spud to look after the pie. Surprisingly, Spud keeps his promise and protects the pie from crows.
| 111 | 7 | "Where's Muck?" | Peter Reeves | 24 April 2004 1 January 2005 (The Environment) | 9-112 | 101B |
Bob and the team are repairing an eroded river bank in the countryside. Muck has to collect the fence posts and the grass matting from JJ's yard to start work but he was in such a rush not to miss out of getting mucky, he forgot the matting, now he has to go back to JJ's. Muck decides to take a shortcut but he suddenly gets lost, then he sees a lost duckling, Muck names the duck Quack and he helps bring the duck back to his family.
| 112 | 8 | "Travis' Busy Day" | Peter Reeves | 25 April 2004 12 February 2005 (Helping Others). | 9-113 | 107C |
Lofty and Travis pull down a damaged tree, only to find that they have made a family of squirrels homeless! Travis is devastated, but suddenly he has an idea which Bob could use the old tree to build a new home for the squirrels.
| 113 | 9 | "Muck's Surprise" | Marc Seal | 1 May 2004 15 January 2005 (Surprises) | 9-114 | 103C |
Bob's gang builds a summer house as an anniversary present for Mrs. Bentley, but Muck nearly ruins the surprise.
| 114 | 10 | "Skip's Big Idea" | Jimmy Hibbert | 2 May 2004 26 March 2005 (Problem Solving) (Note: This episode was first released on the Help Is On the Way! VHS/DVD on 22 March 2005.) | 9-115 | 113A |
Skip wishes he could come up with good ideas, while Bob is renovating the old mill.
| 115 | 11 | "Roley's Important Job" | Diane Redmond | 8 May 2004 12 March 2005 (Confidence) | 9-116 | 111C |
Bob and the gang convert a house into a delicatessen, but there's nothing for Roley to do. Fortunately, Bird and Hamish give him an idea to make him feel useful again.
| 116 | 12 | "Trix and the Bug" | Glenn Dakin | 9 May 2004 8 January 2005 (Divergent Thinking) | 9-117 | 102C |
Bob builds a drive-in cinema, and a fake giant bug is sent to promote a new film. However, Trix causes chaos in the town when she borrows the insect to help Spud scare the birds.
| 117 | 13 | "Mr. Bentley's Winter Fair" | Peter Reeves | 20 December 2004 12 February 2005 (Helping Others) | 9-107 | 107A |
It is the day of the winter fair, and Mr. Bentley is in charge of organising the fair. He tries to plan it like a military exercise to make sure nothing goes wrong, but when Mr. Bentley expresses his disapproval of how the stalls are set up and Humpty escapes from his pen, the fair escalates into chaos.

== Project: Build It (2005–2008) ==
The series was centred around Bob and his crew's adventures in their new home of Sunflower Valley. Many new machines were introduced, and throughout the episodes Bob always tried to be eco-friendly. For North American airings, the show's intro is followed by two shorts of one of machines doing the job before Wendy and Bob wave good morning and begin their jobs. The show ends with Bob's crew going to sleep and Wendy and Bob waving good night before one of Bob's crew and one of other machines does the job.

=== Series 10 (2005) ===
| No. overall | No. in series | Title | Written by | Original release date |
|---|---|---|---|---|
| 118 | N-A (Special) | "Bob's Big Plan" | Sarah Ball | 2 May 2005 3 September 2005 (Note: This episode was first released on the Bob's Big Plan VHS/DVD on 23 August 2005.) |
Bob enters a competition to design a town and decides to make his design as environmentally friendly as possible, only to discover, when he wins the contest, that the prize is the job of building it.
| 119 | 1 | "Bob's Fresh Start" | Marc Seal | 3 May 2005 10 September 2005 |
Bob's crew is nervous as they start work on the Sunflower Valley project, but Muck claims not to be afraid. However, his confidence soon disappears when he and Spud get lost in the woods.
| 120 | 2 | "Lofty's Shelter" | Storyline by : Lorelei King; Written by : Sarah Ball | 4 May 2005 10 September 2005 |
Lofty finds it hard to tell Bob that he wants a place in the new machine shelter.
| 121 | 3 | "Dizzy and the Talkie-Talkie" | Marc Seal | 5 May 2005 17 September 2005 |
Bob and the team build a well, and Wendy gives the team radio headsets called talkie-talkies, in case they get separated. The talkie-talkies come in handy when Dizzy, Scrambler, and Muck get lost in Sunflower Valley.
| 122 | 4 | "Scoop's Recruit" | Sarah Ball | 6 May 2005 17 September 2005 |
Scoop looks for someone to take over Wendy's job at the yard and Bob's dad is the one to do it.
| 123 | 5 | "Where's Robert?" | Sarah Ball | 9 May 2005 24 September 2005 |
Bob's dad Robert slows him down, making Bob wonder how they are going to get everything done in time, but there is more to worry about when the older man disappears at the recycling plant.
| 124 | 6 | "Wendy's Welcome" | Sarah Ball | 10 May 2005 24 September 2005 |
Bob searches for Robert, who is preparing a surprise for Wendy at her new home in Sunflower Valley.
| 125 | 7 | "Roley's New Friend" | Marc Seal | 11 May 2005 1 October 2005 |
Roley makes friends with a bird and helps her find the right spot to build a nest.
| 126 | 8 | "Two Scoops" | t Storyline by : Marc Seal and Sarah Ball; Written by : Peter Reeves | 12 May 2005 1 October 2005 |
Scoop works very hard and makes himself so tired he falls asleep. He soon gets a very good surprise when his friend Benny returns.
| 127 | 9 | "Benny's Back!" | Peter Reeves and Sarah Ball | 13 May 2005 8 October 2005 |
Bob faces a race against time to get everything finished on the workshop and storerooms, as well as doing a job for Farmer Pickles, so Benny and Scrambler help to get the work done.
| 128 | 10 | "Spud's Straw Surprise" | Storyline by : Marc Seal; Written by : Rachel Murrell and Sarah Ball | 16 May 2005 8 October 2005 |
Spud overhears Bob and Farmer Pickles planning to build something new out of straw, and thinks he is going to be replaced.
| 129 | 11 | "Off-Road Scrambler" | Marc Seal | 17 May 2005 15 October 2005 |
Scrambler takes Scruffty for a walk to keep him out of Bob's hair — but finds the excitable dog has plenty of energy to burn.
| 130 | 12 | "Meet Marjorie" | Marc Seal | 18 May 2005 15 October 2005 |
Bob and the team are building the Sunflower factory and the person running it is Marjorie, Dizzy asks a lot of questions so she decides to be quiet and build the storage bay, but goes too far when she doesn't ask Bob first as she tells Benny to put Marjorie's bike somewhere different and it ends up getting damaged.
| 131 | 13 | "Muck's Mud Hut" | Sarah Ball | 19 May 2005 22 October 2005 |
The team build a home for Marjorie, but Muck's decision to create a mud hut ends in disaster.
| 132 | 14 | "Wendy's Party Plan" | Marc Seal | 20 May 2005 22 October 2005 |
Wendy organises a surprise party for Bob, but she is left worrying about the preparations when he puts her in charge of building a new dome at the same time.

=== Series 11 (2005) ===
| No. overall | No. in series | Title | Written by | Original release date |
|---|---|---|---|---|
| 133 | 1 | "Scrambler in the Doghouse" | Marc Seal | 1 August 2005 29 October 2005 |
Bob makes Scruffty a unique kennel using recycled scrap after Scrambler smashes all of the building materials.
| 134 | 2 | "Benny's Important Job" | Rachel Murrell and Marc Seal | 2 August 2005 29 October 2005 |
Bob builds the Bentleys' new home into the side of a hill, and Benny is determined to help, but keeping up with the big diggers is harder than he expected.
| 135 | 3 | "Put-It-Together Spud" | Simon Nicholson (Storyline by Marc Seal) | 3 August 2005 5 November 2005 |
Spud helps Bob put together the machinery for Farmer Pickles' sunflower oil factory, but he leaves his post of protecting sunflowers from crows and he took the parts from the factory without asking first.
| 136 | 4 | "Roley's Round-Up" | Marc Seal | 4 August 2005 5 November 2005 |
Roley finds a way to keep the Bird and his chicks cool in the storeroom.
| 137 | 5 | "Dizzy the Detective" | Dave Ingham | 5 August 2005 12 November 2005 |
A millstone goes missing, so Dizzy and Spud try to track it down by following a trail of clues.
| 138 | 6 | "Two Jobs Travis" | Simon Nicholson | 8 August 2005 12 November 2005 |
When Travis gets his own talkie-talkie, he tries to help Farmer Pickles plant a field of sunflowers and help Bob build a yurt for Mr. Beasley at the same time, which ends in disaster, and he soon realises that it is better to do multiple jobs at once with help from his friends.
| 139 | 7 | "Scrambler and the Colourful Cave Scrambler and the Colorful Cave" | Marc Seal | 9 August 2005 19 November 2005 |
Scrambler stumbles across a strange cave while helping an expert on the Stone Age to decorate his house.
| 140 | 8 | "Spud's Bumper Harvest" | Simon Nicholson | 10 August 2005 19 November 2005 |
Spud causes chaos when he stores a bumper crop of sunflowers in Bob's mobile home.
| 141 | 9 | "Muck's Convoy" | Dave Ingham | 11 August 2005 26 November 2005 |
Muck is told to lead a convoy to the mill, but he cannot remember Bob's directions to get there. Muck claims he will not make mistakes, but when they got to the marshland which Bob told Muck not to go there, Lofty is stuck. What would he do?
| 142 | 10 | "While Bob's Away, Robert Will Play" | Marc Seal | 12 August 2005 26 November 2005 |
Robert turns Bob's old rubble chute into a children's playground, with a little help from some squirrels.
| 143 | 11 | "Bob's Three Jobs" | Marc Seal | 15 August 2005 3 December 2005 |
Bob plans to go bird-watching with his dad, but has three very important jobs to finish first; which take longer than expected.
| 144 | 12 | "Scoop Knows it All" | Simon Nicholson | 16 August 2005 3 December 2005 |
A new forklift named Sumsy joins the team, and Scoop shows her round the valley, but stops her from doing her job delivering the bottles to the shed.

=== Series 12 (2006) ===
| No. overall | No. in series | Title | Written by | Original release date |
|---|---|---|---|---|
| 145 | 1 | "Dizzy's Sleepover" | Dave Ingham | 31 July 2006 7 October 2006 |
While Bob and the machines are refurbishing the watermill, Dizzy discovers there are bats living in the watermill, and she cannot wait to meet them. In the midst of her excitement, Dizzy ends up making a mess around the watermill. After explaining that bats only come out at night, Bob suggests having a sleepover so Dizzy can see the bats.
| 146 | 2 | "Lofty the Star" | Marc Seal | 1 August 2006 7 October 2006 |
The machines build a bunkhouse for Farmer Pickles' sunflower pickers and Lofty gets the chance to show off his talents.
| 147 | 3 | "Sumsy's Willow Tree" | Simon Nicholson | 2 August 2006 14 October 2006 |
The machines chop down a willow tree that's started to topple over and soon discover how useful the woods can be.
| 148 | 4 | "Slow Down Scrambler" | Marc Seal | 3 August 2006 14 October 2006 |
The team builds a bridge, but Scrambler's rushing around causes Dizzy to get stuck in the mud, and then makes matters worse when he drops the cement bags into the river.
| 149 | 5 | "Travis and the Tropical Fruits" | Simon Nicholson | 4 August 2006 24 September 2006 (Treehouse TV; Canada) |
Bob and the gang build a pineapple pit to keep Mr. Beasley's fruit crop warm, and Travis has to fetch a load of manure.
| 150 | 6 | "Scoop the Teacher" | Dave Ingham | 7 August 2006 24 September 2006 (Treehouse TV; Canada) |
The team are building a bakery for Mr. Sabatini and Scoop is asked to tutor young Benny.
| 151 | 7 | "Sir Muck" | Marc Seal | 8 August 2006 21 October 2006 |
Bob and the gang help build a windmill for Mr. Sabatini, Meanwhile, Muck and Spud cause trouble jousting windmills.
| 152 | 8 | "Bashing Crashing Benny" | Marc Seal | 9 August 2006 21 October 2006 |
Benny is given a new attachment and he can't wait to use it, but when he does, he ends up in trouble.
| 153 | 9 | "Spud's Cork Tree" | Dave Ingham | 10 August 2006 28 October 2006 |
Spud learns about the many uses of cork.
| 154 | 10 | "Bob's Top Team" | Simon Nicholson | 11 August 2006 28 October 2006 |
Bob is busy turning the giant dome into a visitors' center and learns that his machines can manage without him sometimes.
| 155 | 11 | "Sumsy and the Beast" | Sarah Ball | 14 August 2006 4 November 2006 |
Sumsy and Spud cause panic across the valley when they spot a strange creature in town.
| 156 | 12 | "Listen with Scrambler" | Marc Seal | 15 August 2006 4 November 2006 |
Scrambler plays with the children in Sunflower Valley on the last day before they return to school in Bobsville. But Scrambler keeps borrowing the materials from the team's surprise build which wouldn't be ready in time.
| 157 | 13 | "Roley's Bird's Eye View" | Sarah Ball | 16 August 2006 11 November 2006 |
Roley would like to get a birds eye view of the valley and is upset that he is too big to reach the top of the observation tower.
| 158 | 14 | "Wendy's Houseboat" | Dave Ingham | 17 August 2006 11 November 2006 |
Wendy and Bob announce they are going to fix up a houseboat, and the rest of the team lends a helping hand.

=== Series 13 (2006) ===
| No. overall | No. in series | Title | Written by | Original release date |
|---|---|---|---|---|
| 159 | 1 | "Mr. Bentley's Assistant" | Simon Nicholson | 18 August 2006 18 November 2006 |
Mr. Bentley prepares to welcome a group of newcomers to the valley. Spud attempts to help out, but inevitably ends up complicating matters.
| 160 | 2 | "Roley's Moleys" | Marc Seal | 21 August 2006 18 November 2006 |
Roley's preparations for a cafe opening are made difficult by some troublesome moles.
| 161 | 3 | "Spud Rushes It" | Marc Seal | 22 August 2006 25 November 2006 |
Bob and the machines make a watering system for Farmer Pickles' new orchard. Spud tries to speed things up but doesn't stick to the process.
| 162 | 4 | "Scrambler's Seaweed Delivery" | Simon Nicholson | 23 August 2006 25 November 2006 |
When Bob builds a seaweed farm for Annie Pickles, Scrambler volunteers to help collect the seaweed from the beach and bring it to the garden.
| 163 | 5 | "Massive Muck" | Marc Seal | 24 August 2006 2 December 2006 |
The team starts work on Annie Pickles' new seafront house, but Muck does not concentrate on the task in hand, as he wants to be better than Scoop.
| 164 | 6 | "Roley's Apple Press" | Dave Ingham | 25 August 2006 2 December 2006 |
Roley wants to help with the apple harvest, but is not much use, so Bob finds something he can do much better.
| 165 | 7 | "Travis' Giddy Day" | Laura Beaumont and Paul Larson | 28 August 2006 9 December 2006 |
The machines build a goat run for Farmer Pickles' newest arrival, Giddy the Goat. Travis is to bring Giddy to the goat run, but Giddy keeps running away.
| 166 | 8 | "Muck's Drying Tunnel" | Simon Nicholson | 29 August 2006 9 December 2006 |
Bob builds a drying tunnel for Annie's seaweed. This inspires Muck to make his own drying tunnel for Mr. Beasley's laundry, but it goes wrong.
| 167 | 9 | "Benny's Jungle Trouble" | Louise Kramskoy | 30 August 2006 16 December 2006 |
Benny gets the wrong idea about a conversation he overheard and heads off into marshland, looking for jungle animals.
| 168 | 10 | "Dizzy the Walking Bus" | Dave Ingham | 31 August 2006 16 December 2006 |
Dizzy is given the task of taking the children to school as their "walking bus", but her excitement leads to her being careless. Bob, Scoop, and Lofty are putting up new road signs, but Dizzy does not mix the cement properly, causing the signs to lean over. Spud makes things worse by turning the signs in the wrong direction after straightening them, leading to Dizzy and the children getting lost in the woods.
| 169 | 11 | "Packer's First Day" | Laura Beaumont and Paul Larson | 1 September 2006 23 December 2006 |
The New Delivery Truck named Packer. Packer arrives in Sunflower Valley, but he finds it very difficult to concentrate on the task at hand.
| 170 | 12 | "The Bob House" | Simon Nicholson | 4 September 2006 23 December 2006 |
Bob designs a house with the help of his father Robert, while Mr. and Mrs. Bentley conduct a survey.

=== Series 14 (2007) ===
| No. overall | No. in series | Title | Written by | Original release date |
|---|---|---|---|---|
| 171 | 1 | "Mr. Bentley's Big Parade" | Marc Seal | 3 September 2007 8 September 2007 |
Mr. Bentley is organising a special parade to announce Sunflower Valley's very first mayor.
| 172 | 2 | "Scrambler the Goat Herder" | David Ingham | 4 September 2007 8 September 2007 |
Scrambler is given the job of bringing Giddy the goat down from Snowcap mountain.
| 173 | 3 | "Packer's Big Delivery" | Simon Nicholson | 5 September 2007 15 September 2007 |
When Packer the delivery truck sets off to collect goat's milk from Meg MacDonald, he gets stuck on a narrow mountain ridge and it's up to Scrambler to rescue him.
| 174 | 4 | "Spud the Woodsman" | Louise Kramskoy | 6 September 2007 15 September 2007 |
Spud wants to become a woodsman like Chip Chipper, but when he causes chaos at the building site he decides to stick with being a scarecrow.
| 175 | 5 | "Muck's Mootastic Dairy" | Laura Beaumont and Paul Larson | 7 September 2007 22 September 2007 |
Bob is building a new dairy and Muck is entrusted with looking after the cows. When the cows cause chaos and knock down the half-built dairy, everyone helps to rebuild it so the cows can be milked before sunset arrives.
| 176 | 6 | "Roley the Green Cat" | Marc Seal | 10 September 2007 22 September 2007 |
Roley is mystified as to why Pilchard doesn't want to play with him any more, until he discovers her with a litter of kittens, and is proud to become Uncle Roley.
| 177 | 7 | "Put-It-Together Bob" | Simon Nicholson | 11 September 2007 29 September 2007 |
When Bob tries to install machinery at Meg's milk bottling plant, he realises it is going to be harder than he first thought–especially when Buttercup the cow eats his plans.
| 178 | 8 | "Dodger the Milk Truck" | Dave Ingham | 12 September 2007 29 September 2007 |
Meg's new milk delivery truck thinks he is not wanted in Sunflower Valley.
| 179 | 9 | "The Three Musketrucks" | Laura Beaumont and Paul Larson | 13 September 2007 6 October 2007 |
Scrambler, Packer, and Dodger make a pact to deliver all their cargo and overcome great obstacles to make it happen.
| 180 | 10 | "Scoop Slips Up" | Louise Kramskoy | 14 September 2007 6 October 2007 |
Bob is building some salt pans by the beach and accidentally breaks the sluice gates. When Scoop slips on some seaweed, he thinks he actually broke the gates, and goes out of his way to stop Bob finding out.
| 181 | 11 | "Dodger's Dairy Disaster" | Laura Beaumont and Paul Larson | 17 September 2007 13 October 2007 |
Dodger is sent to collect ingredients for Meg MacDonald's new cheese, but he ends up making a mess when he tries to amuse everyone with his horn.
| 182 | 12 | "Bob's Beach Hut" | Laura Beaumont and Paul Larson | 18 September 2007 13 October 2007 |
Bob decides to build a beach hut as a surprise for his parents.

=== Series 15 (2007) ===
| No. overall | No. in series | Title | Written by | Original release date |
|---|---|---|---|---|
| 183 | 1 | "The House That Lofty Built" | Simon Nicholson and Marc Seal | 19 September 2007 18 September 2008 (Note: This episode was first released on the Building Bobland Bay DVD on 4 March 2008.) |
Bob moves his mobile home to Bobland Bay and Lofty turns the machine shelter into a makeshift house.
| 184 | 2 | "Bob's Big Idea" | Marc Seal | 20 September 2007 18 September 2008 |
Bob is having trouble designing his dream house in Sunflower Valley.
| 185 | 3 | "Roley Brings the House Down" | Marc Seal | 21 September 2007 20 September 2008 |
Roley and Muck play in the mud, but an accident leads to the old machine shelter being knocked down, leading to a terrible argument between the two machines.
| 186 | 4 | "Muck's Machine Wash" | Dave Ingham | 24 September 2007 20 September 2008 |
Muck is sad when he finds that Bob has built a machine to clean all the vehicles, as he knows it will clean all the muck off him.
| 187 | 5 | "Lofty's Comet" | Simon Nicholson | 25 September 2007 4 October 2008 (Note: This episode was first released on the Lets Build the Beach DVD on 1 July 2008.) |
Bob, his dad and Lofty build an observatory so everyone can watch a comet pass over the valley.
| 188 | 6 | "Lofty the Lifeguard" | Laura Beaumont and Paul Larson | 26 September 2007 4 October 2008 |
Lofty rescues a famous film director, Oscar Flicks, who gets into trouble at sea.
| 189 | 7 | "Star Struck Spud" | Laura Beaumont and Paul Larson | 27 September 2007 11 October 2008 |
Bob and the gang build a drive-in cinema, before Oscar Flicks' sea monster movie shot in Bobland Bay is finally shown.
| 190 | 8 | "Go, Mr. Bentley, Go!" | Simon Nicholson | 28 September 2007 11 October 2008 |
Mr. Bentley takes Scrambler on as his personal trainer when Bob and the team build an exercise park at Bobland Bay.
| 191 | 9 | "Tumbler and the Skate Park" | Marc Seal | 1 October 2007 18 October 2008 |
A new cement mixer named Tumbler arrives in Sunflower Valley to help build a skate park. Dizzy is asked to show Tumbler around the valley, but when he starts teasing her, she decides to leave him behind, until she realizes that she cannot pour all the cement for the skate park on her own.
| 192 | 10 | "Fantastic Flex" | Marc Seal | 2 October 2007 18 October 2008 |
The lens needs replacing on the lighthouse, so Flex comes to help, his showing off causes trouble.
| 193 | 11 | "Packer's Trailer Trouble" | Louise Kramskoy | 3 October 2007 25 October 2008 |
Bob and the machines build an ice-cream parlour in Bobland Bay, but Packer gets his deliveries all muddled up.
| 194 | 12 | "Scoop's Best Team Ever" | Simon Nicholson | 4 October 2007 25 October 2008 |
Scoop worries that Benny will replace him as Bob's number one machine.
| 195 | 13 | "Spud and the Hotel" | Laura Beaumont and Paul Larson | 5 October 2007 1 November 2008 |
The team has built a new hotel in Bobland Bay and are finishing it up with guest villas. Meanwhile, Spud welcomes the hotel's first guests and pretends to be the hotel manager while trying his hand at several jobs, such as carrying the guests' luggage and cooking their lunch.
| 196 | 14 | "Tumbler's Perfect Promenade" | Dave Ingham | 8 October 2007 1 November 2008 |
Tumbler wants the promenade at the Bobland Bay Hotel to be unique to Bobland Bay.
| 197 | 15 | "Clean as a Whistle Bristle" | Dave Ingham | 9 October 2007 8 November 2008 |
Items go missing soon after Bristle the street cleaner arrives.

=== Series 16 (2008) ===
| No. overall | No. in series | Title | Written by | Original release date |
|---|---|---|---|---|
| 198 | 1 | "Zoomer's Snowy Adventure" | Dave Ingham | 5 August 2008 8 November 2008 |
Zoomer stays with Bob in Sunflower Valley, and when heavy snow blocks everyone in, it is down to Zoomer and Scoop to save the day.
| 199 | 2 | "Radio Bob" | Simon Nicholson | 6 August 2008 15 November 2008 |
Bob and the machines build a radio studio and they think of ideas for their own shows.
| 200 | 3 | "Tumbler and the Ice Rink" | Laura Beaumont and Paul Larson | 7 August 2008 15 November 2008 |
Tumbler and Dizzy are on their way to collect some concrete when Dizzy gets trapped in a snow drift.
| 201 | 4 | "Spud the DJ" | Laura Beaumont and Paul Larson | 11 August 2008 22 November 2008 |
Spud causes chaos when he looks after the radio station and announces on air that a storm is on the way.
| 202 | 5 | "Silent Scoop" | Dave Ingham | 12 August 2008 22 November 2008 |
Mike Turntable finishes his night shift at the radio station and tries to get some sleep, while Bob and the gang build a new swimming pool at the Bobland Bay hotel.
| 203 | 6 | "Scrambler Gets Prepared" | Marc Seal | 13 August 2008 29 November 2008 |
Scrambler takes the kids on an overnight badger patrol with Chip Chipper, and he sets out to prove he is prepared for anything.
| 204 | 7 | "Sumsy's Special Building" | Simon Nicholson | 14 August 2008 29 November 2008 |
The team builds an office for the Mayor using unusual recycled materials.
| 205 | 8 | "Lofty's Banana Tree" | Simon Nicholson | 18 August 2008 6 December 2008 |
The machines build a hot house in Bobland Bay so they can grow tropical plants.
| 206 | 9 | "Roley's Flat Garden" | Simon Nicholson | 19 August 2008 6 December 2008 |
Bob and the team are building a new botanical garden for Mr. Bentley. Roley thinks the garden should be flat, but doesn't realise (realize in the US) that some plants need to be planted on bumpy spots.
| 207 | 10 | "Super Splasher" | Laura Beaumont and Paul Larson | 20 August 2008 9 February 2009 |
Splasher arrives in town and sets about rescuing everyone.
| 208 | 11 | "Breezy Bristle" | Dave Ingham | 21 August 2008 9 February 2009 |
Bob and the crew plan to surprise Gripper and Grabber with a new shelter when the duo return to Sunflower Valley on a hot day.
| 209 | 12 | "Splasher's Two Stops" | Marc Seal | 25 August 2008 14 February 2009 |
The team builds two shelter stops for Splasher's new ferry route as everybody gets ready for the big summer party in Bobland Bay. But Splasher wants to start his route before the stops are even built and he ends up leaving without several passengers. He also tries juggling with being in two places at once.
| 210 | 13 | "An Inspector Calls" | Marc Seal | 26 August 2008 14 February 2009 |
Mr. Carruthers, the chief building inspector, comes to inspect Bob's team's work.

== Ready, Steady, Build! (2010–2011) ==
The second spin-off is Bob the Builder: Ready, Steady, Build!. In June 2008, over a year after production of Project: Build It wrapped up, it was announced that the series would be revamped for environmental CGI. The gang has now apparently moved to a place called Fixham Harbour and the show is now animated in CGI animation instead of the traditional stop-motion animation.

=== Series 17 (2010) ===
| No. overall | No. in series | Title | Written by | Original release date |
|---|---|---|---|---|
| 211 | 1 | "Scratch's Hidden Treasures" | Lisa Akhurst | 12 April 2010 3 July 2010 (Note: This episode was first released on the Heavy Duty Diggers DVD on 3 March 2010.) |
When Scratch finds buried treasure outside Fixham Museum, Scoop and Muck decide he is the best one to dig them up.
| 212 | 2 | "Scrambler's Best Idea" | Lisa Akhurst | 13 April 2010 24 July 2010 |
Scrambler is disappointed when Roley beats him in the Playtime Build Competition, and decides to create his own treehouse anyway.
| 213 | 3 | "Scoop the Artist" | Lisa Akhurst | 14 April 2010 10 July 2010 |
Scoop meets a famous artist, David Mockney, and tries to become one himself.
| 214 | 4 | "High Tide for Lofty" | Anna Starkey | 15 April 2010 31 July 2010 |
Bob and the team are rebuilding the old pier, but Lofty is afraid to get too close to the water because the tide will come in.
| 215 | 5 | "Roley's Rovers" | Sharon Miller | 16 April 2010 (Note: This episode was first released on Starting From Scratch DVD on 12 April 2010.) 24 July 2010 (Note: This episode was first released on the Building From Scratch DVD on 15 June 2010.) |
Wendy tells the machines they need a mascot to become a real team after they find a football to play with. After finding out Mr. Bentley's football scarf is the same colour as him, Roley decides to be a mascot.
| 216 | 6 | "Start from Scratch" | Ross Hastings | 19 April 2010 24 July 2010 |
Scratch tries to impress Bob with a football trick.
| 217 | 7 | "Night Time Scratch" | Ross Hastings | 20 April 2010 31 July 2010 |
Scratch is so excited about installing floodlights at the football pitch that he is unable to sleep, but when the time comes to turn them on, he struggles to stay awake.
| 218 | 8 | "Lofty and the Monster" | Louise Kramskoy | 21 April 2010 3 July 2010 |
Scoop, Dizzy and Scrambler play a game of monster chase, but Lofty does not realise they are only playing.
| 219 | 9 | "Dizzy in Charge" | Ross Hastings | 22 April 2010 17 July 2010 |
Bob leaves Dizzy in charge of tidying the yard when he and the rest of the team are sent out on a job.
| 220 | 10 | "Lofty's Helpful Day" | Lisa Akhurst | 23 April 2010 17 July 2010 |
Lofty really wants to be as helpful as he can, but ends up taking on so many jobs that he gets confused.
| 221 | 11 | "Scoop's Sea Rescue" | Lisa Akhurst | 26 April 2010 14 August 2010 |
Splasher is delivering a new lens to Fixham Lighthouse. Meanwhile, Scoop is busy daydreaming about the sea, which leads to an accident.
| 222 | 12 | "Scratch's Star Turn" | Louise Kramskoy | 27 April 2010 14 August 2010 |
The famous actor, Dickie Olivier, arrives in Fixham to celebrate History Day, and after Bob turns an old ship into a stage, Scratch is given the chance to tread the boards in a play.
| 223 | 13 | "Pineapple Scratch" | Ross Hastings | 28 April 2010 7 August 2010 |
Brad's conch shell and pineapple go missing, just as he is celebrating the opening of his beach café. Scratch sets off to pick them up, but gets lost in his way back to the beach.
| 224 | 14 | "Scrambler's Stage Surprise" | Lisa Akhurst | 29 April 2010 21 August 2010 |
When a storm damages the Fixham theatre, Bob and the team have to work fast to repair it in time for the opening of a play. Scrambler and Spud, meanwhile, try to surprise Lofty, but they go too far and frighten him away.
| 225 | 15 | "Wendy's Birthday Surprise" | Lisa Akhurst | 30 April 2010 7 August 2010 |
Getting ready for Wendy's surprise birthday party proves to be a challenge, especially when Scoop tries to do everything himself. When Wendy's birthday present falls into the well the team are working on, Scoop realises he needs help from his friends to complete the job and get the party ready on time.
| 226 | 16 | "Scratch Goes Solo" | Simon Nicholson | 24 May 2010 28 August 2010 |
Scratch has a solo job digging for Farmer Pickles, but soon becomes lonely without the others.
| 227 | 17 | "Dizzy and the Wheelies" | Louise Kramskoy | 25 May 2010 28 August 2010 |
Dizzy's stunts impress are a real hit, until Scrambler upstages her, and she becomes desperate to prove she is still the best.
| 228 | 18 | "Muck's Beach Tower" | Ross Hastings | 26 May 2010 21 August 2010 |
Muck tries to build a sandcastle and he forgets about the job that took him to the beach in the first place.
| 229 | 19 | "Here Comes Muck" | Simon Nicholson | 27 May 2010 4 September 2010 |
Bob and the gang rebuild the yard and create new garages for themselves. Muck wants to come out of his new garage first, but soon learns it's best to be a team.
| 230 | 20 | "Scrambler Gets Clean" | Ross Hastings | 28 May 2010 4 September 2010 |
Bob and the gang finish the machine wash, but Scrambler is afraid to use it. So he tries to avoid getting dirty, which proves to be challenging.

=== Mini Series 1: The Legend of the Golden Hammer (2010) ===
| No. overall | No. in series | Title | Written by | Original release date |
|---|---|---|---|---|
| 231 | 1 | "Scrambler and the Clue" | Marc Seal | 25 October 2010 (Note: This episode was first released on The Legend of the Golden Hammer DVD on 24 May 2010.) 22 October 2011 (Note: This episode was first released on The Legend of the Golden Hammer DVD on 10 December 2010.) |
Bob and the team are summoned to Fixham Museum by its curator David Mockney. Spud and Scrambler, meanwhile, try to hunt for Pirate Brickbeard's Golden Hammer as a surprise for Bob.
| 232 | 2 | "Lofty and the Teddy Bear Rescue" | Simon Nicholson | 25 October 2010 22 October 2011 |
Lofty sees a box of teddy bears and decides to move them out of the way.
| 233 | 3 | "Muck and the Old School Wall" | Simon Nicholson | 25 October 2010 29 October 2011 |
When Muck insists that he saw a picture of a dragon on a school wall the team demolished, no one believes him. So he sets off with the bricks to rebuild the picture, only to sink in the mud in the process.
| 234 | 4 | "Scoop's Big Job" | Louise Kramskoy | 25 October 2010 29 October 2011 |
Spud and Scrambler are still searching for the Golden Hammer and are trying to figure out what the latest clue means. Meanwhile, Scoop becomes jealous when Splasher comes to help do the big jobs at the lighthouse. So he tries to outdo him with disastrous results.
| 235 | 5 | "Dizzy Finds a Pirate" | Louise Kramskoy | 25 October 2010 5 November 2011 |
When Dizzy tells the team that she has seen Brickbeard backstage, nobody believes her. Despite this, she is determined not to give up.
| 236 | 6 | "Roley and the Seagull" | Marc Seal | 25 October 2010 5 November 2011 |
Roley befriends a seagull that gets very angry when the team begins to lift the old ship out of the water.

=== Series 18 (2011) ===
| No. overall | No. in series | Title | Written by | Original release date |
|---|---|---|---|---|
| 237 | 1 | "Whizzy Dizzy" | Lisa Akhurst | 26 September 2011 24 September 2011 |
Dizzy sets out to prove how quickly she can get things done when the team builds a new workshop for Bob.
| 238 | 2 | "Travis' New Garage" | Louise Kramskoy | 27 September 2011 24 September 2011 |
Roley decides to become the team's official lost-property officer, but his enthusiasm for finding things interferes with work on a new garage for Travis.
| 239 | 3 | "Scratch and the Dream Room Scratch and the Dream Home" | Ross Hastings | 28 September 2011 8 November 2011 |
Scratch persuades the other machines to let Spud design and build his own home.
| 240 | 4 | "Stage Struck Dizzy" | Anna Starkey | 29 September 2011 8 November 2011 |
The team works at a theatre, building a shed to store props and scenery.
| 241 | 5 | "Roley and the Fox" | Lisa Akhurst | 30 September 2011 1 October 2011 |
The team builds a jungle-themed mini-golf course, and Roley befriends a fox.
| 242 | 6 | "Super Scrambler" | Lisa Akhurst | 3 October 2011 15 October 2011 |
Scrambler dreams of emulating his favourite superhero, and comments from Scoop and Muck make him even more determined to achieve his goal.
| 243 | 7 | "Roley's Weather Rap" | Simon Nicholson | 4 October 2011 15 October 2011 |
Roley writes a rap about the weather so he can help Brad Rad make announcements to his surfing students. Suddenly, the weather keeps changing.
| 244 | 8 | "Bob's Big Bounce Bob and the Trampoline" | Louise Kramskoy | 5 October 2011 1 October 2011 |
The team builds a trampoline by the children's playground, but problems arise when Scratch tries to fix a problem without asking for help.

=== Mini Series 2: The Big Dino Dig (2011) ===
| No. overall | No. in series | Title | Written by | Original release date |
|---|---|---|---|---|
| 245 | 1 | "Lofty and the Diggers Three" | Marc Seal | 31 December 2011 (Note: This episode was first released in the UK on The Big Dino Dig DVD on 19 September 2011.) 3 September 2011 (Note: This episode was first released in the US on The Big Dino Dig DVD on 14 June 2011.) |
Lofty is jealous of the camaraderie between the three diggers, even more so when a new dump truck named Rubble joins them when they start working on a new fun park. So he sets out to prove he is as clever as the diggers.
| 246 | 2 | "Scoop and the Roller Coaster" | Lisa Akhurst | 31 December 2011 3 September 2011 |
Today's job is to build a roller coaster at the dinosaur theme park, and Scratch is desperate to find his own dinosaur. Scoop tells him that he has a plan to do just that.
| 247 | 3 | "Rubble and the Seagull Surprise" | Louise Kramskoy | 31 December 2011 10 September 2011 |
Bob and the team are building a flying ride at the dinosaur park. Meanwhile, Rubble tries to chase a seagull who has stolen some important paper plans.
| 248 | 4 | "Roley and the Impossible Bump" | Ross Hastings | 31 December 2011 10 September 2011 |
Roley is flattered when Scratch tells him he thinks he's the best flattener in the world! So he tries to flatten the biggest bump in the Dinosaur park before the inspection. He is unable to, but soon finds out why; underneath the bump reveals into a triceratops skeleton.
| 249 | 5 | "Muck's Train to Trouble" | Simon Nicholson | 31 December 2011 17 September 2011 |
Scoop, Muck, and Scratch all work together to dig all the foundations for a train ride at the Dinosaur Park. Muck insists he doesn't need help, but this soon leads to trouble as the train is set off before the train track is complete.
| 250 | 6 | "A Dinosaur for Scratch" | Ross Hastings | 31 December 2011 17 September 2011 |
Scratch only has 1 last chance to find a dinosaur. He digs everywhere he can, unaware that Bob and the rest of the building crew are preparing a big surprise for him.

== Shorts & Interstitials ==
=== Mini Adventures (2001) ===
The Mini Adventures were produced in 2000 in-between production of the fourth and fifth series and were paired in half-hour blocks for North American airings of the first six series. (Note: The Mini Adventures were also featured in half-hour broadcasts of the seventh/eighth series on Treehouse TV and TVOKids in Canada.)

| No. overall | No. in series | Title | Written by | UK VHS/DVD release (top) Nick Jr. airdate (bottom) |
|---|---|---|---|---|
| 1 | 1 | "Wendy's Watering Can" | Ruth Estevez | 11 February 2002 19 January 2001 |
Dizzy helps Wendy with watering her garden.
| 2 | 2 | "Muck's Mood" | Ben Randall | 11 February 2002 6 June 2001 |
Muck is upset when the other machines are called to do jobs before him.
| 3 | 3 | "Muck's Short Cut" | Nick Abadzis | 11 February 2002 23 January 2001 |
Muck and Lofty help each other when they are forced to go over a bridge and under a tunnel on their own.
| 4 | 4 | "Rocking Roley" | Chris Trengove | 11 February 2002 1 February 2001 |
Roley writes a song for the team to cheer himself up when the others leave on a job.
| 5 | 5 | "Lofty the Football Star Lofty the Soccer Star" | Ian Carney | 10 June 2002 17 January 2001 |
Lofty is chosen to be captain of a football team against Scoop.
| 6 | 6 | "Pilchard Has a Ball" | Ross Hastings | 10 June 2002 22 January 2001 |
Pilchard and Scruffty learn to share a ball when Farmer Pickles visits Bob's yard.
| 7 | 7 | "Dizzy Scores a Goal" | James Henry | 10 June 2002 17 January 2001 |
Dizzy and the other machines have to work together when their football gets stuck up on the roof.
| 8 | 8 | "Roley's Rock Garden" | James Henry | 20 August 2002 7 June 2001 |
While helping to build a rockery, Roley discovers Tommy the tortoise resting among the rocks.
| 9 | 9 | "Bob's Spring Cleaning" | Diane Redmond | 20 August 2002 15 January 2001 |
Bob and Lofty are surprised when a group of hedgehogs help clean up litter near the road.
| 10 | 10 | "Spud Gets Packing" | Diane Redmond | 20 August 2002 6 June 2001 |
Spud struggles with packing crates into Travis' trailer but gets unexpected help from Squawk.
| 11 | 11 | "Spud the Ghost" | James Henry | 20 August 2002 16 January 2001 |
After Muck spooks Spud while playing on the road, Spud decides to get him back by pretending to be a ghost.
| 12 | 12 | "Scoop's Shapes" | Ian Carney | 16 June 2003 13 January 2001 |
While Bob is away, Scoop guides Lofty on placing a set of shaped tiles.
| 13 | 13 | "Scruffty's Bathtime" | Diane Redmond | 16 June 2003 4 June 2001 |
Farmer Pickles chase after Scruffty when he doesn't want to get clean.
| 14 | 14 | "Spud Goes Apple-Picking" | Ian Carney | 16 June 2003 5 June 2001 |
A group of naughty rabbits take Spud's apples behind his back.
| 15 | 15 | "Wendy's Bright Plan" | Ben Randall | 15 September 2003 24 January 2001 |
Wendy helps the machines sort out an order of supplies in the yard.
| 16 | 16 | "Pilchard Sorts it Out" | Ruth Estevez | 15 September 2003 4 June 2001 |
Bob sorts out an order of bricks when they arrive mixed together; meanwhile, Pilchard causes a mess in Bob's office.
| 17 | 17 | "Spud in the Clouds" | Ross Hastings | 15 September 2003 25 January 2001 |
Spud and Travis get distracted from their jobs by clouds.
| 18 | 18 | "Spud Minds His Manners" | Diane Redmond | 9 February 2004 30 January 2001 |
Bob allows Spud to join him and Wendy for tea - if he minds his manners.
| 19 | 19 | "Sing-A-Long Bird" | Ross Hastings | 9 February 2004 13 January 2001 |
Dizzy and Roley come up with melodies for Bird to copy.
| 20 | 20 | "Sporty Spud" | Chris Trengove | 5 July 2004 25 January 2001 |
Spud sees safety barriers as hurdles to jump over, which lands him into trouble.
| 21 | 21 | "Bob's Bucket" | Ross Hastings | 5 July 2004 15 January 2001 |
Bob and the others come up for creative uses for a bucket when it forms a hole.
| 22 | 22 | "Lofty and the Tree Stump" | Ben Randall | 5 July 2004 7 June 2001 |
Bob discovery a family of mice taking residence under a tree stump.
| 23 | 23 | "Mrs. Potts' Paint Pots" | Chris Trengove | 5 July 2004 1 February 2001 |
Dizzy picks up the wrong shade of paint while Wendy prepares to redecorate Mrs. Potts' living room.
| 24 | 24 | "Square Dance Spud" | Ross Hastings | 5 July 2004 15 January 2001 |
While repairing a barnstead, Bob, Wendy and Spud try to show off their dance moves, with Spud getting carried away.
| 25 | 25 | "Sleepless Lofty" | Ross Hastings | 5 July 2004 18 January 2001 |
Muck helps Lofty get back to sleep after a series of strange noises keep him up.
| 26 | 26 | "Bob Saves Energy" | Chris Trengove | 5 July 2004 26 January 2001 |
Bob sets up a wind turbine at Farmer Pickles' farm and teaches Lofty and Dizzy about ways to save energy.

=== Interstitials (2003) ===
A set of Interstitials (also referred to as "Short Stories" & "Bob Stars!") were produced in 2003 in-between production of the eighth and ninth series. They were aired primarily as interstitials during commercial breaks.

They were first released on DVD in the United Kingdom from 2005-2006 before airing on BBC from 2009-2010; they were also paired in half-hour blocks of the first and second series on PBS in 2006.

| No. overall | No. in series | Title | Written by | UK DVD release PBS airdate (bottom) |
|---|---|---|---|---|
| 1 | 1 | "An Apple a Day" | N/A | 14 November 2005 4 February 2006 |
Spud mourns his love for apples after getting a tummyache from eating too many.
| 2 | 2 | "I Can't Get Down" | N/A | 14 November 2005 11 March 2006 |
Bob is left stranded on a scrap pile when Spud takes his ladder again.
| 3 | 3 | "Find That Cat" | N/A | 14 November 2005 25 February 2006 |
Wendy searches for Pilchard with Roley after she wanders off during a storm.
| 4 | 4 | "Bob's Brass Band" | N/A | 14 November 2005 18 March 2006 |
Bob leads a brass band throughout Bobsville.
| 5 | 5 | "Spud's Picnic" | N/A | 6 February 2006 4 March 2006 |
Spud tries to fish out food from Wendy's basket and set up his own picnic.
| 6 | 6 | "Wendy in the Middle" | N/A | 6 February 2006 18 February 2006 |
The machines' game of Piggy in the Middle gets in the way of Wendy's rest.
| 7 | 7 | "Beachcomber Bob" | N/A | 6 February 2006 11 February 2006 |
Bob and Scoop search for shells in the sand while Spud tries to set up his tent.
| 8 | 8 | "Sailaway Spud" | N/A | 6 February 2006 25 March 2006 (Note: This Short was first released in Dig Lift Haul DVD on 23 March 2004.) |
A sandcastle competition is spoiled when Spud and Roley attempt to land sail.
| 9 | 9 | "Bob Five-O" | N/A | 10 April 2006 11 February 2006 |
Bob wipes out while on his first go at surfing.
| 10 | 10 | "Volleyball Dizzy" | N/A | 10 April 2006 11 March 2006 |
Dizzy finds her own way to play volleyball.
| 11 | 11 | "Lofty and the Crab" | N/A | 10 April 2006 18 February 2006 |
Lofty is forced to be brave when a crab obstructs him from collecting firewood.
| 12 | 12 | "Muck's Sand Castle" | N/A | 10 April 2006 4 February 2006 |
Muck and Scoop build a machine-sized sand castle, but ends up trapping himself inside.

=== Bob's Mini Projects (2005-2008) ===
==== Series 1 (2005) ====
The initial series of Bob's Mini Projects were produced in 2004 in-between production of the ninth and tenth series. In North America, they would be paired alongside the tenth series for half-hour airings, with the shorts repeated for future series.

Twelve of the shorts would be released onto DVD in the United Kingdom, and would later be aired as interstitials on CBeebies in 2007; "Bob and the Dry Stone Wall" and "Stepping Stones" were only released on the Bob the Builder website, and otherwise aired only in other countries.

| No. overall | No. in series | Title | Written by | BBC airdate (top) PBS airdate |
|---|---|---|---|---|
| 1 | 1 | "Scoop and the Worms" | Peter Reeves | 31 October 2007 24 September 2005 |
Scoop tries to keep worms out of danger while digging a foundation.
| 2 | 2 | "Rowdy Roley" | Peter Reeves | 1 November 2007 10 September 2005 |
Roley's singing inadvertently frightens the animals, so he attempts to be more quiet.
| 3 | 3 | "Lofty and the Otters" | Peter Reeves | 1 November 2007 17 September 2005 |
Lofty tries to get a family of otters across the road, still wet with cement.
| 4 | 4 | "Dizzy's Tree" | Peter Reeves | 13 November 2007 10 September 2005 |
Dizzy learns to appreciate trees when they are tasked to plant a new one.
| 5 | 5 | "Wendy Weaves a Basket" | Lorelei King | 14 November 2007 24 September 2005 |
A bird steals the twigs Wendy collects for weaving a basket.
| 6 | 6 | "Muck's Water Butt Muck's Rain Barrel" | Peter Reeves | 15 November 2007 17 September 2005 |
A family of ducks take residence in Muck's scoop when it is filled with rainwater.
| 7 | 7 | "Hedges and Holes" | Ross Hastings | 16 November 2007 10 September 2005 |
Scoop fills up his own holes while digging for a row of hedges.
| 8 | 8 | "Spud the Tree" | Peter Reeves | 17 November 2007 24 September 2005 |
Spud dresses himself up as a tree, but attracts the attention of some animals.
| 9 | 9 | "Recycling Pilchard" | Ross Hastings | 10 November 2007 10 September 2005 |
Pilchard falls into a recycling bin while Bob and the machine drop off recyclables.
| 10 | 10 | "Bob and the Hedgehogs Bob and the Porcupines" | Peter Reeves | 11 November 2007 24 September 2005 |
Bob creates a hedgehog crossing sign after he discovers they are frightened of the machines crossing the road.
| 11 | 11 | "Bob's Hammock" | Lorelei King | 29 October 2007 17 September 2005 |
Spud tries to get a rest when Bob is called away for extra jobs.
| 12 | 12 | "Sun Time" | Sarah Ball | 30 October 2007 8 October 2005 |
After forgetting his watch, Bob and the machines make a sundial using shadows.
| 13 | 13 | "Bob and the Dry Stone Wall" | Sarah Ball | N/A 8 October 2005 |
Bob shows how useful a dry stone wall can be after one is knocked down.
| 14 | 14 | "Stepping Stones" | Sarah Ball | 2008 17 September 2005 |
After discovering footprints in the forest, Bob is inspired to make stepping stones with animal patterns.

==== Series 2 (2005) ====
A second set of shorts would be produced in 2005 to be aired alongside the eleventh series in North America, being produced prior to said series. The shorts would be aired as interstitials in Australia, with eleven of the shorts (with the exception of "Benny's Animal Talk", which was released on the Bob the Builder Website) being released on DVD.

| No. overall | No. in series | Title | Written by | UK DVD release (top) PBS airdate (bottom) |
|---|---|---|---|---|
| 15 | 1 | "Scrambler's Off-Road Team" | Marc Seal | 3 November 2008 5 November 2005 |
Scrambler is impressed by the tricks that the animals are able to do.
| 16 | 2 | "Bob's Poem" | Ross Hastings | 3 November 2008 12 November 2005 |
Bob comes up with a poem to describe the beauty of Sunflower Valley.
| 17 | 3 | "Spud's Lunchbreak" | Marc Seal | 26 January 2009 12 November 2005 |
Spud's thoughtless littering attracts the ire of the nearby animals.
| 18 | 4 | "Bob's Birdfeeder" | Lorelei King | 26 January 2009 29 October 2005 |
Bob comes up with a creative solution to prevent squirrels from eating off his birdfeeder.
| 19 | 5 | "Scoop's Reflections" | Marc Seal | 26 January 2009 29 October 2005 |
Muck argues with Scoop over whether or not they can see themselves in the river.
| 20 | 6 | "Spud's Toasted Marshmallows" | Lorelei King | 26 January 2009 5 November 2005 |
Wendy teaches Spud how to toast food over a fire.
| 21 | 7 | "Roley the Worm Charmer" | Peter Reeves | 26 January 2009 29 October 2005 |
Bob hosts a competition to charm worms from the ground, of which Roley's rocking and rolling does the trick.
| 22 | 8 | "Dizzy's Ducklings" | Lorelei King | 20 July 2009 29 October 2005 |
Dizzy attracts a family of baby ducks after a tear in her bag leaves behind a trail of sunflower seeds.
| 23 | 9 | "Scrambler the Shepherd" | Diane Redmond | 20 July 2009 12 November 2005 |
Scrambler tries to help Scruffty after he interrups his herding.
| 24 | 10 | "Benny's Keepsake" | Lorelei King | 20 July 2009 5 November 2005 |
Marjorie makes Benny a keepsake necklace out of dried sunflower seeds and other plants.
| 25 | 11 | "Hide and Tweet Watch the Birdie" | Ross Hastings | 7 September 2009 5 November 2005 |
While building a bird hide, a bird eats Bob's lunch.
| 26 | 12 | "Benny's Animal Talk" | Ross Hastings | 2008 12 November 2005 |
Benny imitates animals that he and Scoop come across, including one neither can recognise.

==== Series 3 (2008) ====
The third and final series of Mini Projects were produced in 2007 in-between production of the fifteenth and sixteenth series. They were also paired alongside select segments from the previous two series, redubbed to match the new voice for Bob in North America.

Three of the shorts would be released onto DVD in the United Kingdom; the other three were released on the Bob the Builder website in 2008.

| No. overall | No. in series | Title | Written by | UK DVD release (top) PBS airdate (bottom) |
|---|---|---|---|---|
| 27 | 1 | "Beach Music" | Louise Kramskoy | 20 July 2009 18 October 2008 |
The Pickers help Dizzy and Tumbler create beach music using their drums as shakers.
| 28 | 2 | "Shut That Gate" | Louise Kramskoy | 20 July 2009 4 October 2008 |
Scrambler, Packer and Dodger forget to close a gate while racing and have to prevent a cow from escaping.
| 29 | 3 | "It's Oh So Early" | Louise Kramskoy | 7 September 2009 20 September 2008 |
Dodger accidentally wakes the others up during an early morning milk run.
| 30 | 4 | "Tumbler Cleans Up" | Peter Reeves | 2008 11 October 2008 |
Dodger and Flex have to come up with a way to get Tumbler to leave the Machine Wash.
| 31 | 5 | "Finder Flex" | Louise Kramskoy | 2008 25 October 2008 |
Flex proves himself in a game of hide and seek at the new shelter.
| 32 | 6 | "Bristle the Sheepdog" | Peter Reeves | 2008 1 November 2008 |
Bristle helps Scrambler herd wayward sheep.
