= Diane Redmond =

British writer and playwright

Diane Redmond is a British author and dramatist. She became interested in children's literature while teaching English in Italy. Redmond returned to England where she continued teaching. She also became a radio and TV presenter.

Redmond is a prolific writer for children, having authored the Joshua Cross series of historical adventure stories. Redmond has also written for the stage, radio and television.
