= MirrorWorld =

Series of novels by Cornelia Funke

- The Petrified Flesh (2010); Living Shadows (2013); The Golden Yarn (2015); The Silver Tracks (2021); TBA
- Author: Cornelia Funke
- Illustrator: Cornelia Funke
- Country: Germany
- Language: German
- Genre: Fantasy, Bildungsroman
- Publisher: Cecilie Dressler Verlag (Germany); Chicken House Publishing (UK); Little, Brown and Company (United States)
- Published: 14 September 2010 – present
- Published in English: 14 September 2010 – present
- Media type: Print (Hardback & Paperback)
- No. of books: 4

The MirrorWorld is a planned pentalogy of fantasy novels written by German author Cornelia Funke in collaboration with Lionel Wigram. As of 2026, the first four books in the series have been published, titled The Petrified Flesh, Living Shadows, The Golden Yarn, and The Silver Tracks. The series, based on 19th-Century Europe, features many elements of fairy tales, notably the tales of the German Brothers Grimm. Funke plans to include fairy tales from other cultures, such as Spain, France and Russia in future novels.

MirrorWorld is Cornelia Funke's first series of novels in which she has collaborated with another person; this is because, whilst working on a script idea with Lionel Wingram, they both "discovered" the story. Funke loved the idea so much that she asked Wingram if she could turn it into a novel; he agreed but requested that he be involved in the creative process.

After deciding to work on the series, Funke took three years to write the first novel, Reckless, due to another novel she was writing at the time. Unlike writing Inkheart and the subsequent novels in the Inkheart series, Funke did not visually base many characters on people she knew. Only Clara is based on the daughter of a Scottish friend, though her hair color is different in the book.

== Premise ==
MirrorWorld explores a scenario in which every fairy tale ever told is true. The protagonists Jacob, Fox, and Will set off on adventures within this universe featuring elements from various fairy tales.
