= Rise FX =

German visual effects company

- Company type: Private
- Industry: Visual effects
- Founded: 2007
- Headquarters: Berlin, Germany
- Number of employees: 100-200 (2018)
- Website: www.risefx.com

Rise FX is a German visual effects company with offices in Berlin, Munich, Stuttgart, Cologne, and London.

Rise FX has worked on several films of the Marvel Cinematic Universe like Avengers: Endgame, Captain Marvel, Ant-Man and the Wasp, Avengers: Infinity War, Black Panther, Doctor Strange, Captain America: Civil War, Avengers: Age of Ultron, Guardians of the Galaxy, Captain America: The Winter Soldier, and Iron Man 3.

Past credits include The King's Man, Doctor Sleep, Hobbs & Shaw, Hellboy, Shazam!, Dumbo, The Fate of the Furious, Harry Potter and the Deathly Hallows, X-Men: First Class, Cloud Atlas, A Cure for Wellness, The Man from U.N.C.L.E., A Hologram for the King, Richard the Stork, Sleeping Sickness, and This Is Love. Work on TV shows includes Stranger Things, Borgia, Dark, Babylon Berlin, and Sense8.

== Film and TV projects ==
- Ijon Tichy: Space Pilot (2007) (Note: Season two only)
- Helen (2009)
- Ninja Assassin (2009)
- The Door (2009)
- The Last Station (2009)
- 12 Paces Without a Head (2009)
- Percy Jackson & the Olympians: The Lightning Thief (2010)
- Harry Potter and the Deathly Hallows - Part 1 (2010)
- The Sinking of the Laconia (2011)
- X-Men: First Class (2011)
- Captain America: The First Avenger (2011)
- Blutzbrüdaz (2011)
- Russian Disco (2012)
- Cloud Atlas (2012)
- Iron Man 3 (2013)
- The Book Thief (2013)
- Captain America: The Winter Soldier (2014)
- Guardians of the Galaxy (2014)
- Unfinished Business (2015)
- Avengers: Age of Ultron (2015)
- Sense8 (2015-18) (Note: Season two only)
- The Man from U.N.C.L.E. (2015)
- Hitman: Agent 47 (2015)
- A Hologram for the King (2016)
- Captain America: Civil War (2016)
- Stranger Things (2016-) (Note: Season three only)
- Doctor Strange (2016)
- A Cure for Wellness (2016)
- The Fate of the Furious (2017)
- Richard the Stork (2017)
- The Dark Tower (2017)
- Renegades (2017)
- Babylon Berlin (2017-)
- Fack ju Göhte 3 (2017)
- Dark (2017-20)
- Black Panther (2018)
- Mute (2018)
- Avengers: Infinity War (2018)
- Ant-Man and the Wasp (2018)
- Captain Marvel (2019)
- Dumbo (2019)
- Shazam! (2019)
- Hellboy (2019)
- Avengers: Endgame (2019)
- Hobbs & Shaw (2019)
- Doctor Sleep (2019)
- Artemis Fowl (2020)
- Kingdoms of Fire (2019) (Note: TV series that ran for one season)
- Biohackers (2020-21) (Note: Season one only)
- Lovecraft Country (2020) (Note: TV series that ran for one season)
- Jim Button and the Wild 13 (2020)
- WandaVision (2021) (Note: TV miniseries)
- Stowaway (2021)
- Lisey’s Story (2021) (Note: TV miniseries)
- Loki (2021-2023) (Note: Season one only)
- Gunpowder Milkshake (2021)
- Reminiscence (2021)
- Midnight Mass (2021) (Note: TV miniseries)
- The French Dispatch (2021)
- Eternals (2021)
- The Wheel of Time (2021) (Note: Season one only)
- Hawkeye (2021)
- The Matrix Resurrections (2021)
- The King's Man (2021)
- Uncharted (2022)
- Fantastic Beasts: The Secrets of Dumbledore (2022)
- Ms. Marvel (2022) (Note: TV miniseries)
- Black Panther: Wakanda Forever (2022)
- The Last of Us (2023-)
- Shazam! Fury of the Gods (2023)
- Ghosted (2023)
- Citadel (2023)
- Guardians of the Galaxy Vol. 3 (2023)
- Then You Run (2023) (Note: TV miniseries)
- The Last Voyage of the Demeter (2023)
- Blue Beetle (2023)
- Nyad (2023)
- The Marvels (2023)
- The Hunger Games: The Ballad of Songbirds & Snakes (2023)
- Red One (2024)
- Daredevil: Born Again (2025-)
- Ironheart (2025) (Note: TV miniseries)

== History ==
Rise FX was founded in 2007 by Sven Pannicke, Robert Pinnow, Markus Degen, and Florian Gellinger. International breakthrough happened after their work on German drama film This Is Love (2009) when Marvel Studios contacted them.

== Rise Pictures ==
Rise Pictures (Rise PX) is Rise FX's production unit, currently co-producing Dragon Rider (an adaptation of Cornelia Funke's Dragon Rider) with Constantin Film.
