= Dragon Rider =

Dragon Rider, Dragonrider or DragonRider may refer to:

== Arts, entertainment, and media ==
- Dragon Rider (novel), a 1997 novel by Cornelia Funke
  - Dragon Rider (film), a 2020 film based on the novel
- Dragonriders of Pern, a series of novels by Anne and Todd McCaffrey
  - "Dragonrider", a segment of the 1968 novel Dragonflight
- Dragonrider, a villain from Marvel Comics
- Dragon Riders, a group of fictional magician-warriors in Christopher Paolini's The Inheritance Cycle
- Dragon Rider, a song by Jay Chou from the 2008 album Capricorn

== Other ==
- DragonRider, the former name of the SpaceX Dragon 2 spacecraft by SpaceX

== See also ==
- Eragon (film)
