= Inkheart series =

Fantasy book series by Cornelia Funke

- Original editions of the series, designed by Martina Petersen and author Cornelia Funke
- Inkheart (2003); Inkspell (2005); Inkdeath (2007); The Colour of Revenge (2023)
- Author: Cornelia Funke
- Original title: Tintenwelt
- Translator: Anthea Bell
- Illustrator: Cornelia Funke
- Country: Germany
- Language: German
- Genre: Fantasy, Bildungsroman, Mystery
- Publisher: (Germany) Cecilie Dressler Verlag; (United Kingdom) Chicken House Publishing; (United States) Scholastic Corporation
- Published: 23 September 2003 – 25 October 2023
- Published in English: 6 October 2003 – October 2023
- Media type: Print (Hardback & Paperback) and audiobook

The Inkheart series is a succession of four fantasy novels written by German author Cornelia Funke, comprising Inkheart (2003), Inkspell (2005), Inkdeath (2007), and The Colour of Revenge (2024). The books chronicle the adventures of teen Meggie Folchart whose life changes dramatically when she realizes that she and her father, a bookbinder named Mo, have the unusual ability to bring characters from books into the real world when reading aloud. Mostly set in Northern Italy and the parallel world of the fictional Inkheart book, the central story arc concerns the magic of books, their characters and creatures, and the art of reading.

Originally released in German-speaking Europe, the third book, entitled Inkdeath, was released in an English translation by Anthea Bell in October 2008. In 2004, Funke sold the film rights to all three books to New Line Cinema; thus far, the first book has been made into a motion picture, which was released in December 2008.

Initially conceived as a trilogy, a sequel, The Colour of Revenge (German: Die Farbe der Rache), was published in October 2023 in Germany.

== Plot summary ==
=== Inkheart ===
In Inkheart, the twelve-year-old, Meggie, discovers that her father Mo, a professional bookbinder, has the unusual ability to transfer characters from books into the real world when he reads aloud—they call those with this ability "Silvertongue". Mo once brought four characters of a book entitled Inkheart to life while reading from the novel, including Dustfinger, his pet marten Gwin; Capricorn, the book's villain; and Basta, Capricorn's right-hand man—in bitter exchange for his wife Teresa (later known as Resa), who disappeared without a trace into the so-called Inkworld of the book. After many years Dustfinger returns to pay Meggie and her father a visit, advising them to flee the country to escape Capricorn and his followers who are in search of Mo and his Inkheart copy. The three of them eventually leave to hide at Meggie's great-aunt Elinor's house in Northern Italy but end up being dragged off by Basta and his companions to the near village of Capricorn, because Dustfinger betrayed them as Capricorn promised him he would help him go back home. He then forces Mo to read treasures out of books, since his useless reader, Darius, could not do it. Meggie soon discovers she has the same talent as her father when she summons the monster known as "The Shadow" out of the book. She helps to kill Capricorn and his entourage with the power of her reading talent.

=== Inkspell ===
A year has passed, but not a day goes by without Meggie thinking of Inkheart. Resa is back, but she has become mute. Dustfinger wants to go back to his wife, Roxanne, and his daughters who are in the story. When he finds a self-absorbed psycho storyteller, Orpheus, who can read him back into the book, he goes into the pages, but Orpheus doesn't read Farid back into the book like he was supposed to, because he leaves the word "boy" out. Soon Farid convinces Meggie to read him into the book so he can warn Dustfinger of Basta, and then becomes his apprentice once more. But this time, Meggie has figured out how to read herself and Farid into the book Inkheart.

Suddenly, Mortola, Basta, Orpheus, and a "man built like a wardrobe" barge into Elinor's house, and take Mo, Resa, Elinor, and Darius prisoner, while Meggie and Farid have no idea what is happening in the other world. Orpheus reads Basta, Mortola, Mo, and Resa into Inkheart. Mortola gets a modern rifle, and shoots Mo, thinking that she has killed him and leaves. However, Mo survived the shot. Resa discovers that her voice has come back to her. Resa and Mo are hiding with the strolling players, but now they have discovered that the injured Mo is the mysterious gentleman-robber, the "Bluejay", created by Fenoglio, the Inkweaver's words. Fenoglio is now living within his own story and he makes Meggie read Cosimo the Fair back into the story since he died, Meggie being kissed by Farid shortly after. Now the Adderhead is out to get him, waiting to hang him or kill his family in front of him. Mo and Resa are captured and Mo is unable to escape because of his fatal wound. Meggie, Resa, and Mo all end up in the Adderhead's castle (the Castle of Night), while Meggie has made a bargain with the Adderhead that she will bind him a book of immortality if he lets her, Resa, Mo, and the other strolling players he has captured go. What she doesn't tell the prince is that if three words are written in the book—heart, spell, death—the Adderhead will die instantly. In the meanwhile, Farid and Dustfinger have snuck into the castle using soot that causes invisibility, created by a combination of fire and water. Meggie and Farid fall in love. Farid is later killed by Basta, one of Capricorn's old followers, who is then killed by Mo. Later, Dustfinger summons the White Women to bring Farid back to life, sacrificing himself. Roxane, Dustfinger's wife, realizes this and is furious at Farid for taking away her love, but is powerless to do anything. Meggie reads Orpheus into the story using Fenoglio's words, although Orpheus refuses to believe that she read him into the book. Farid agrees to work for Orpheus as a servant if he writes something to bring Dustfinger back to life. But Farid wonders, will he live up to the agreement and will Dustfinger ever come back?

=== Inkdeath ===
Farid, now the servant of Orpheus, and has been trying to convince the man to bring Dustfinger back from the dead. Orpheus agrees to read him back, but under one condition: Mo takes his place in death. Mo summons the White Women using words that Orpheus copied from Inkheart, and they bring him to the world of the dead, causing a lot of commotion amongst those around him. In the world of the dead, Mo meets Death herself, and Death bargains with Mo. Mo must bring the Adderhead to Death before Spring comes or Meggie and Mo will die.

The vicious herald of the Silver Prince and the servant of the Milksop, King of Ombra, where the characters are staying, kidnap all of the children in the town and threatens to work them to death at the silver mines. But Mo is returned to the world of the living along with Dustfinger, and the two hatch a plan. Mo "The Bluejay" turns himself in to the Piper as his prisoner in exchange for the children, who are hidden by the Black Prince and his men in a cave. Violante, the Adderhead's daughter rescues him and brings him to the castle by the lake, where she used to live, because she wants the Bluejay to kill the Adderhead by writing the three words in the White Book in exchange for the children. The Adderhead goes after her while sending the Milksop after the children. The Black Prince however, learns of the Milksop's march, and moves the children to a giant tree in the forest said to be a stronghold against giants. They are attacked, but Meggie reads a Giantess out of Fenoglio's words, and they are able to fend them off, and kill Sootbird, the fire-eater who took Dustfinger's place. At the castle, the Adderhead's men follow a secret passage to the inside, and Violante's child-soldiers get slaughtered, the BlueJay captured, and Dustfinger killed by a Night-Mare conjured up by Orpheus, who is now the Adderhead's servant. Resa shape-shifts into a swift, using magical seeds that were used by Mortola before she was killed by the Adderhead's men and searches for the white book along with Dustfinger. Dustfinger pretends to betray Mo, to earn the Piper's trust, but really was leading the Adderhead on, in an elaborate plan with Bluejay and Violante. Under the Piper's supervision, Mo works on a new White Book, to replace the Adderhead's. The Adderhead's grandson, Jacopo, steals the White Book from the Adderhead and secretly hands it to Mo. Mo writes the three words and the Adderhead dies. A short skirmish takes place, Dustfinger kills the Night-Mare, and Resa and Mo kill the Piper. Meanwhile, the Adderhead's bodyguard, Thumbling, steals all of the Adderheads possessions and takes off.

The last part of the book explains that Orpheus runs away to the cold mountains, Farid goes traveling as a fire-dancer, and Meggie stays with Doria. Resa gives birth to a child and it is a boy. He wishes he could see the world where his father, mother and sister were born in as he thinks it is much more exciting than his own because of the stories told to him by Elinor. The boy and Resa both turn into birds every few nights as a side-effect of the seeds, but all in all it is assumed that the entire surviving cast lives happily ever after in Ombra, with Violante as their queen.

== Awards ==
The first volume, Inkheart, won the Phantastik-Preis der Stadt Wetzlar for children's fiction in Germany in 2004, and was selected as the best novel of the year in children's literature by the Jury der jungen Leser in June of the same year. It was also awarded the Kalbacher Klapperschlange and the Silberner Griffel, receiving nominations for the Deutscher Jugendliteraturpreis and the Rattenfänger-Literaturpreis. In June 2007 Inkheart was voted, in a composite online and phone poll-show named Unsere Besten, organized by the ZDF network, as the eleventh best book of all time by the general public.

Follow-up Inkspell won the Book Sense Book of the Year Award in the category "Children's Literature".

== Adaptations ==
In October 2004, a series of various theatrical version of the first two books started with the world premiere of Inkheart at the Schauspielhaus Hannover. It has since been staged in several cities in Germany, notably at the Staatstheater Stuttgart, and the Wuppertaler Kinder- und Jugendtheater. In September 2006 a musical version premiered at the Junges Theater Bonn, involving over twenty actors and actresses and a live band.

In 2004, New Line Cinema bought the film rights to all three books for a cinema adaptation, beginning with the production of the first novel, Inkheart. Funke moved to Los Angeles, California in May 2005 after she had accepted the offer to participate as the film's producer alongside Barry Mendel. Principal photography on Inkheart began on location in Liguria, Italy on 8 November 2006, before moving to Shepperton Studios in Surrey, England. Directed by Iain Softley, the film is based on a screenplay by David Lindsay-Abaire and involving an ensemble cast, that includes Brendan Fraser, Helen Mirren, Paul Bettany, Jim Broadbent, Rafi Gavron, Andy Serkis and newcomer Eliza Bennett, among others.

== Sequel ==
In April 2020, Cornelia Funke announced on her website that a fourth installment of the Inkworld adventures would be published by October 2021, which came as a surprise. The title of the novel is Die Farbe der Rache (The Colour of Revenge), and is the final part of the story. The first 15 chapters were serialized as audiobooks starting in April 2020 in Germany, even though the book wasn't finished at the time. Funke called this uncommon action a service to her fans under lockdown measures for the COVID-19 pandemic. The plot takes place five years after the events of Inkdeath, and includes all of the series’ major characters, like Meggie, Farid, Dustfinger, and Orpheus. According to the author, the term "revenge" refers to Orpheus longing for retribution by seeking help from an evil witch.
