= Rollo Weeks =

British actor

- Born: Rollo Percival Loring Weeks; 20 March 1987 (age 39); Chichester, England
- Other name: Rollo Wade
- Occupations: Former actor; photographer; advertising cinematographer
- Years active: 1993–2012 (as an actor)
- Relatives: Perdita Weeks (sister); Honeysuckle Weeks (sister)

Rollo Percival Loring Weeks (born 20 March 1987) is a British former actor. He is best known for his roles in the films The Little Vampire (2000) and The Thief Lord (2006).

== Early life ==
Weeks was born in Chichester, England, the son of Welsh parents Robin and Susan Weeks, and the younger brother of actresses Honeysuckle Weeks and Perdita Weeks. He attended the Sylvia Young Theatre School and Stowe School.

== Career ==
Weeks' first screen appearance was, according to his sister Honeysuckle, who told the story when appearing on The Late Late Show with Craig Ferguson in 2014, for a Devon Custard advertisement, aged 6, which ended abruptly when Rollo was sick whilst eating the sponsors product. Weeks' debut film, as a child actor, was playing vampire Rudolph Sackville-Bagg in The Little Vampire (2000), directed by Uli Edel, which earned Weeks a Young Artist Award nomination. He also appeared in Stephen Poliakoff's The Lost Prince (filmed 2002, released 2003) as the young George, Duke of Kent, in a film about the disabled Prince John. This was followed by roles in Girl With a Pearl Earring (2003) and The Queen of Sheba's Pearls (2004).

His second turn as a title character came as Scipio in The Thief Lord (2006), a movie based on Cornelia Funke's novel The Thief Lord and directed by Richard Claus. Weeks has also appeared in two television shows: Berkeley Square (1998) as Lord Louis Wilton and Goggle Eyes (1993) as Joseph. In 2009 he appeared in the second part of the Shark Week special Blood in the Water and played the character Guido in Chéri. In 2010, he played Jacob in Booked Out, about the lives of characters within an aging block of flats.

In 2016, Weeks was reported to be one of "a dynamic trio of young hospitality industry insiders" opening a new fast food outlet called Fancy Funkin Chicken in Coldharbour Lane, Brixton. The restaurant closed permanently in 2020.

Weeks now works as a photographer and advertising cinematographer, publicly appearing under the name "Rollo Wade".

== Filmography ==
Year	Title	Role	Notes
1993	Goggle Eyes	Joseph	Film debut
1995	Braveheart	Child in crowd (at Wallace's death)	
1995	It Could Be You	Damon	
1998	Berkeley Square	Lord Louis Wilton	
2000	The Little Vampire	Rudolph Sackville-Bagg	
2001	Attila	Young Attila	
2003	The Lost Prince	Prince George Duke of Kent	
2003	Girl with a Pearl Earring	Frans	
2004	George and the Dragon	Wryn	
2004	The Queen of Sheba's Pearls	Jack	
2006	The Thief Lord	Scipio Massimo	
2009	Chéri	Guido	
2009	Blood in the Water: 2	Albert O'Hara	
2012	Booked Out	Jacob	Final film
