= Reckless I: The Petrified Flesh =

2010 novel by Cornelia Funke and Lionel Wigram

Reckless
- Author: Cornelia Funke; Lionel Wigram
- Translator: Oliver Latsch
- Cover artist: Steve Wells and Plant43
- Language: German
- Series: MirrorWorld
- Genre: Fantasy
- Publication date: 14 September 2010
- Publication place: United Kingdom
- Media type: Print paperback
- ISBN: 978-1-905294-85-5
- Followed by: Fearless

The Petrified Flesh is a 2010 young adult novel by Cornelia Funke and Lionel Wigram. It is the first book in her MirrorWorld series. Originally published on 14 September 2010 with the title Reckless, it was rereleased 29 September 2016 as Reckless I: The Petrified Flesh. The novel was inspired by the tales of the Brothers Grimm. A sequel, Reckless II: Living Shadows, originally titled Fearless, was released on September 16, 2012.

== Publication ==
Reckless was originally released by Chicken House Publishing on September 14, 2010. It was rereleased and retitled as Reckless I: The Petrified Flesh by Pushkin Press on September 29, 2016.

== Plot summary ==
Reckless opens with twelve-year-old Jacob Reckless using a mirror to enter the magical world of Mirrorworld.

Twelve years later, Jacob's brother Will follows Jacob into the Mirrorworld. Will is attacked by a Goyl, a humanoid race with stone skin. As a result of this, Will's skin begins turning to stone. Jacob knows that the stone will soon invade Will's entire body, and Will will become one of the Goyl and he rides off in search of a cure. He is told that the berries that grow in the garden of child-eating witch may cure Will of the curse. Will sneaks back through the mirror to say goodbye to his girlfriend Clara over the phone, leading to her going to the Reckless brothers' house and entering the mirror.

Jacob, Will, Clara and Jacob's vixen friend, Fox, journey to the witch's house, which lies deserted. When they arrive, they realize that they're being pursued by a dangerous creature called The Tailor. Jacob and Fox fight The Tailor, with Will and Clara inside the gates, which The Tailor cannot enter, but Jacob is wounded on the shoulder during the fight. Will takes the berries, and they sleep. In the morning, Will's condition has not changed; the berries did not work. In another attempt to save his brother, Jacob decides to visit the Red Fairy, in the hope that he can convince her to help break the curse. Jacob forces a dwarf named Valiant to help the group find her. Meanwhile, the Goyl King's right hand leads a group of Goyl soldiers to find Will, because they believe he is destined to become the ultimate protector of their king, as his skin is turning to jade.

The Goyl patrol attacks the group before they get to the Red Fairy, but Valiant is able to show them how to enter the secret valley where she is. Jacob then rows to the Fairies' Island while the rest of the party wait on the shore of the lake. Miranda, the Red Fairy, tells Jacob that the curse will be lifted if the Dark Fairy, who created the curse, was destroyed. Jacob puts Will into a deep sleep to stop the spread of the stone till the curse can be lifted by giving him an enchanted rose that Will pricks his finger on. Valiant betrays the group and tells the Goyl soldiers how to enter the secret valley. They attack the group, killing Jacob and taking the sleeping Will captive. Valiant, who has developed a soft spot for Clara, stays behind, and begins to dig a grave for Jacob. While he does this, the Red Fairy brings Jacob back from the dead.

The group travels to the Goyl city underneath the mountains to rescue Will. Valiant makes a deal with Jacob to lead them there. An argument in the mountains leads to Jacob and Valiant deciding to leave Clara and Fox behind. Valiant manages to smuggle Jacob into the Goyl city. Inside the city, a merchant informs Valiant that Will is being held in the Floating Palace high above the mountains. Jacob climbs up to it after making himself invisible.

While Jacob is climbing the Palace Walls, he is attacked and captured, then questioned on the whereabouts of Clara and Fox. He is tortured and gives away their location, then passes into a deep sleep. When he wakes up, he finds himself in a cell next to a still sleeping Will, waiting to be woken by a kiss from his true love. The Dark Fairy arrives with Clara and Fox, who have been found and captured. Clara kisses Will, and he wakes. He is now completely Goyl, with no trace remaining of Will.

Will leaves his cell, so that he can protect the Goyl King, and Clara is jailed in the cell next to Jacob, with Fox locked up on the floor above them. Later, Valiant appears and rescues them all. They leave the city with a biplane.

On their way back to the tower where the Mirror stands, Jacob decides he will not give up on Will. He catches a train to the Empire's capital city, leaving the others to return to the tower on their own. Jacob understands that going there is his last chance to kill the Dark Fairy and undo the curse she put upon Will. The Goyl King is going to marry the Empress' daughter in order to make peace between the humans and the Goyl. Jacob tried to spy on the Dark Fairy and Will in the palace but Will hears him, breaks down the wall, and begins to fight with Jacob. The fight is interrupted and Jacob is given an audience with the Empress. Jacob tells her that he must kill the Dark Fairy because of his brother and needs her help. She sends one of her officials to tell Jacob that the Dark Fairy takes a walk through the Palace Gardens every evening, and offers to give him access. That evening, Jacob ambushes the Dark Fairy. He touches her and says her true name, which turns her into a tree. She then promises that she will turn Will back into his human form, if Jacob allows him to protect the King during the wedding to the Empress' daughter.

Jacob steals a golden ball from the Palace, which will trap anyone who catches it inside until it is polished, planning to use it on Will. Jacob attends the wedding, as do Clara, Valiant and Fox. The Empress has ordered an attack on the Goyl King and his people during the ceremony. The Cathedral turns into a bloodbath, and many of the humans die. Jacob realizes he has played into the Empress' hands and led the Goyl to a slaughter so he shouts her name to release her from the tree. The Black Moths of the Dark Fairy fill the Cathedral, poisoning hundreds of humans but Jacob protects Clara. The Goyl win the battle, and the wedding ceremony continues.

After the wedding, Jacob meets with the Dark Fairy, who tells him that she will return Will to his human form under the condition that Jacob take him very far away, because if she sees him again, she will kill him. Jacob manages to catch Will in the golden ball and the Dark Fairy returns him to his human form while still trapped.

Jacob then returns to the tower with Clara, Fox and Valiant. When they arrive at the tower, Jacob tells Clara to polish the golden ball until she sees her reflection. As she does this, Will is released, completely human again, and he embraces Clara. Will and Clara then leave MirrorWorld.

The book then sets up the start of the sequel, implying the price Jacob paid for the cure was a curse being put on him.

== Characters ==
- Jacob Reckless: The protagonist of the book, Jacob is a 24-year-old who discovers a secret world behind the mirror in his missing father's study. Jacob escapes to the Mirrorworld for weeks or months at a time. He views family and friends as a burden, and prefers a life where the consequences of his actions do not harm those he loves. He is named after Jacob Grimm.
- Will Reckless: Jacob's younger brother who is very dependent on his older brother. He is named after Wilhelm Grimm. The first time Will follows Jacob into the Mirrorworld, he is attacked by a Goyl, a race of stone men that live beyond the mirror. Will's skin begins to turn stone, as he becomes the legendary jade Goyl.
- Clara: Will's girlfriend. They met in a hospital, where Clara was a resident and where Will was caring for his dying mother. Clara follows Will into the Mirrorworld to find him partially turned to stone.
- Fox (born Celeste): One of Jacob's few friends. She is a shapeshifter, and mostly she prefers to be a vixen. She travels with Jacob after he saves her life, and understands him at times better than Jacob himself. Fox got the power to shapeshift through a dress she got after saving a vixens life. She is maximum 15 years old, but still a very adult character. She is in love with Jacob. Foxes are given supportive and major roles in 6 of the Grimms' fairy tales.
- Evenaugh Valiant: A dwarf who eventually accompanies Jacob on his mission to cure Will. Dwarves are famous mainly in the Grimms' Snow White, but have appeared casually in other stories.
- Niomee The Dark Fairy: Kami'en's lover. She created the spell that caused any physical attack from a Goyl to turn a man into Goyl himself. She is despised by the other Fairies for leaving their home.
- Miranda the Red Fairy: Sister to the Dark Fairy. She saves dying Jacob after he had been attacked by Unicorns while treasure hunting.
- Kami'en: The King of the Goyl. The first carnelian to lead the Goyl. An excellent strategist who has led the Goyl to victory over the humans of the Mirrorworld.
- Hentzau: The King's right hand, and a Jasper Goyl. He is sent by the King and the Dark Fairy to find the Jade Goyl.
- Albert Chanute: A fellow treasure hunter, and the closest thing Jacob has to a father-figure.
- Victoria the empress: The empress who runs all and is determined to capture Jacob reckless for he behavior of his father

== Grimm tales mentioned in Reckless ==
- The Frog Prince
- Cinderella
- Rapunzel
- The Table, the Ass, and the Stick
- Snow White
- Hansel and Gretel
- Rumplestiltskin
- "Sleeping Beauty"

== Reception ==
Publishers Weekly gave a mixed response, saying that the "writing is beautiful on one page, clunky on another" and that the "rich re-imagining of familiar fairy tale details is the best part, as there is little character development".

School Library Journal praised the book, saying that if "Percy Jackson and the Olympians sent kids to the library asking for Greek myths, Reckless will have them wanting the original fairy tales Funke weaves throughout her story."

The combined printing run for the first hardcover edition was 1,000,000 copies. In Germany, Cornelia Funke's home country, Reckless debuted at #1 on the best-seller list.

== See also ==
- Grimm's Fairy Tales
