= F (film) =

2010 film by Johannes Roberts

- Film poster
- Directed by: Johannes Roberts
- Written by: Johannes Roberts
- Produced by: Ernest Riera
- Starring: David Schofield; Eliza Bennett; Ruth Gemmell; Juliet Aubrey; Roxanne McKee
- Cinematography: Tim Sidell
- Edited by: John Palmer
- Music by: Neil Stemp
- Production companies: Black Robe; Gatlin Pictures; Capital Markets Film Finance
- Distributed by: Optimum Releasing
- Release dates: 27 August 2010 (London FrightFest Film Festival); 17 September 2010 (United Kingdom)
- Running time: 79 minutes
- Country: United Kingdom
- Language: English
- Budget: £150,000

F (also known as The Expelled) is a 2010 British slasher film written and directed by Johannes Roberts, and starring David Schofield, Eliza Bennett, Ruth Gemmell, Juliet Aubrey and Roxanne McKee. It follows a group of teachers who must defend themselves from a gang of murderous youths when their school comes under siege after hours.

F had its premiere at the London FrightFest Film Festival on 27 August 2010, and was released in the United Kingdom on 17 September 2010, by Optimum Releasing. The film received positive reviews from critics, particularly within the horror genre community. It was praised for its intense atmosphere and tension, though some critics found it formulaic.

== Plot ==
A teacher at Wittering College in north London, Robert Anderson (Schofield), is hit in the face by a pupil and forced to take three months' leave to avoid being sued by the parents of the child for giving the pupil an F grade, which is against school policy. Anderson is deeply affected by the incident and upon his return to teaching, he is an alcoholic, emotionally disturbed and separated from his wife, Helen (Aubrey). Their daughter, Kate (Bennett), lives with her mother Helen and has classes with her father, but does not respect him. The headmistress, Sarah Balham (Gemmell), loathes Anderson and clearly wants to get rid of him, but the National Union of Teachers does not allow her to fire him. She indirectly accuses him of bad teaching and bringing alcohol into the building

When Anderson reads about violence in another school, he sends a memo advising all employees at the school about the high number of attacks on teachers and auxiliary staff annually. As a result, he is considered paranoid and delusional by everybody at the school. One day, after hours, Anderson is overseeing detention, in which he has placed his daughter. They argue over her use of a mobile telephone during the detention session – he slaps her in the face and immediately regrets it. Soon after, the protagonist notes some strange movements outside the school and discovers that the telephone lines are down. As he stands by a closed window, a milkshake is thrown at him from outside and the message 'U R Dead' appears written in the milkshake. He advises security guard James (Finlay Robertson), who seems uninterested.

Meanwhile, another security guard Brian, (Jamie Kenna) has been murdered by hoodies who locked him in a wheelie bin and set fire to it. Looking for his daughter, Anderson visits the school library but, after he leaves, the librarian is confronted by two hooded characters, who murder her. Anderson finds his daughter smoking in the toilets with her boyfriend, Jake Eaves (Max Fowler) and headmistress Balham instructs them all to go home. Kate tells Balham that her father slapped her, and Balham asks her to make a statement. Meanwhile, PE teacher Nicky (McKee) passes through the gymnasium and into the changing rooms, where she is attacked by four teenagers wearing hoodies and carrying crowbars.

Having left the building, Anderson goes to his car but finds the dead security guard's torch on the ground in the car park. Meanwhile, Kate is writing her statement in the staff room. Balham realises she can finally sack Anderson and, unable to use the telephone, calls security guard James to ensure that the teacher does not re-enter the school, and Helen, to inform her of the assault. Balham subsequently finds a body and escapes from two attackers herself, only for them to kill her before she can call the police. Anderson then discovers her corpse, her face badly disfigured. He tries to call the police, but when an attacker enters the room he hides, abandoning the phone, which the attacker crushes. Leaving the building, Kate is immediately chased back in by one of the attackers. Her boyfriend Eaves, who was waiting outside, enters the building to look for her. She comes across a member of auxiliary staff Gary, (Tom Mannion), who is unaware of the situation in the school and goes after the attackers, but is electrocuted immediately after discovering Eaves, who is wrapped in barbed wire. Anderson and James team up to find Kate, who has left a 'Help' note in view of a CCTV camera. They discover Nicky struggling along a corridor, but she has been badly mutilated. Finding the room in which Kate is hiding, they are confronted by a hoodie and in a moment of cowardice, James locks the door with Anderson inside.

Meanwhile, the police arrive and enter the school. A female police officer is pushed down a flight of concrete stairs by one of the hoodies and the other policeman is hit with a crowbar in the face. The attackers then find James, who tries to escape but is cornered by the youths. Anderson finds Kate, but one of the hooded attackers catches the pair off guard, but his attack on Anderson is deflected and he stabs and wounds Kate. Anderson manages to overpower the attacker, grabs the knife and stabs him multiple times, then picks up his daughter and rushes out of the building. However, when they reach his car, they spot Helen's car in the car park and realise that she has arrived at the school. Anderson has to decide in an instant whether to save his daughter's life by driving her to hospital, or to save Helen by re-entering the school. He puts Kate in the back seat of the car and drives her to the hospital, leaving Helen to walk around the school, unaware of her potential fate.

== Cast ==
- David Schofield as Robert Anderson, English teacher
- Eliza Bennett as Kate Anderson, his daughter
- Ruth Gemmell as Sarah Balham, head teacher
- Juliet Aubrey as Helen Anderson, Robert's estranged wife
- Emma Cleasby as Lucy, school librarian
- Finlay Robertson as James, school security officer
- Roxanne McKee as Nicky Wright, PE teacher
- Tom Mannion as Gary, school caretaker
- Max Fowler as Jake Eaves, Kate's boyfriend
- Jamie Kenna as Brian Stanton, school security officer
- Ian Cullen as Maths Teacher

== Critical reception ==
Variety wrote "Green-tinged lensing provides a unifying, if oppressive, aesthetic, while the sparse, haunting score, incorporating sinister choral elements, makes the grade." The Guardian wrote "F doesn't quite work, but it aims at something interesting." While Bloody Disgusting said "It's not perfect, but it's a solid, well shot slasher/thriller hybrid that fans of Ils (Them) or Eden Lake should probably appreciate."

Peter Bradshaw of the Guardian wrote that "There's a classy cast, including Ruth Gemmell as the headteacher and Juliet Aubrey as Robert's wife, but those faceless demon-hoodies seem to belong to a more supernatural kind of thriller to me, and slightly undermine the realist impact".

Kim Newman wrote that "It’s a fun suspense-slasher horror, but Schofield roots it in a credible, cutting modern British horror of Daily Mail headlines and teachers driven to nervous breakdowns".
