= Ghost Knight =

2011 children's novel by Cornelia Funke

First edition (publ. Dressler)

Ghost Knight is a children's novel written by the German author Cornelia Funke. It was first published under the German title Geisterritter in 2011. It was translated by Oliver Latsch from German to English and published in 2012. A theatrical adaptation of the novel was performed at the Thalia Theater in Hamburg in 2012.

== Plot summary ==
The novel is narrated by 11-year-old Jon Whitcroft, who is sent against his will to boarding school in Salisbury after an unsuccessful campaign to get rid of his mother's boyfriend, whom he disdainfully calls The Beard. Once at Salisbury Cathedral School, he finds, quite to his disappointment, it is not too bad.

On his sixth night he hears the snorting of horses and sees three riders on horseback – all transparent, with dark bruises and burned out eyes. None of the other boys can see them. The next evening, the ghosts reappear and chase Jon to the walls of the Cathedral. They call him "Hartgill" (his mother's maiden name) and promise to return and kill him.

Jon's desperate quest to find out why the ghosts are after him leads him to the mystery of a centuries-old murder. Meanwhile, he is still pursued by the vengeful ghosts, so with the help of a new friend, Ella, he summons a noble ghost – Sir William Longspee, the Ghost Knight of the title – to protect him. They finally uncover a complicated truth and right a grievous wrong.

== Characters ==
- Jon Whitcroft: The main protagonist. He is the son of Margaret Whitcroft (née Hartgill). His father died when he was four. He is sent to a boarding school, which his late father had attended. Jon initially hates his mother's boyfriend, while his two unnamed sisters and their dog Larry like The Beard. He is best friends with Ella, and is Longespee's squire.
- Ella Littlejohn: Jon's best friend. She lives with her grandmother, and is well versed about ghosts. She guides Jon in the novel and helps him solve his problems. She is named after Ella Wigram.
- William Longespee: The ghost knight. He aids Jon in defeating Lord Stourton's ghost. He brands Jon with a lion's crest, letting the boy call him any time. He makes Jon his squire.
- Lord Stourton: The main antagonist. He haunts Jon because he is the descendant of the Hartgill's. Stourton is finally sent to hell after the combined forces of Jon and Longespee defeat him.
- Zelda Littlejohn: Ella's grandmother. She is described to look very ancient, like an owl. She is a believer of ghosts, and has met them also. She takes care of Ella when her parents are away, and is shown to care for her when she is kidnapped by Lord Stourton's minions.
- Matthew Littlejohn: Zelda's son, Ella's uncle and The Beard. He is a dentist, who keeps a beard for hiding a scar, which he shaves in the end. He is warm and friendly with Jon, who initially doesn't return the feelings. It is Jon who convinces his uncertain mother to marry Matthew, showing that the frostiness between them had melted to an extent. He helps Jon and Zelda rescue Ella from Lord Stourton's servants, and aides the children further while they retrieve Longespee's heart.
- Margaret Whitcroft (née Hartgill): Jon's mother. She falls in love with The Beard, much to the disgust of her son. She is a very caring mother, and also loves Jon a lot. She is convinced by Jon in the end to marry The Beard when she is skeptical.
- Ella Wigram: William Longspee's wife, also deceased. She haunts the abbey where she died after becoming a nun. (She swore not to marry again after the death of Longspee.) She is Ella Littlejohn's namesake.
