= Booked Out =

2012 film

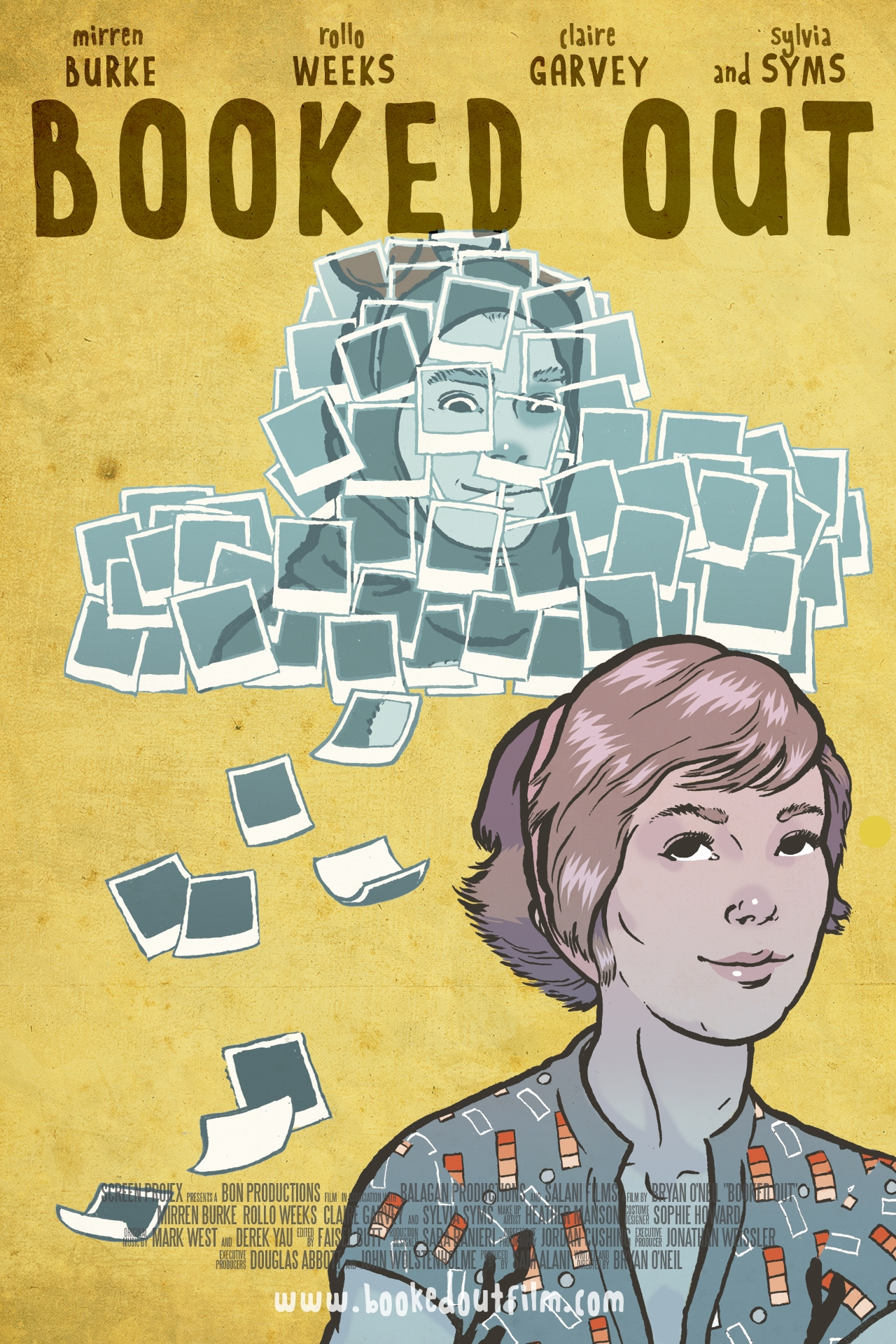
- Film poster by Toby Atkins
- Directed by: Bryan O'Neil
- Written by: Bryan O'Neil
- Starring: Mirren Burke; Rollo Weeks; Sylvia Syms; Claire Garvey
- Cinematography: Jordan Cushing
- Release date: 12 March 2012
- Running time: 90 minutes
- Country: United Kingdom
- Language: English

Booked Out is a 2012 comedy-drama film starring Mirren Burke, Rollo Weeks (in his final film role before his retirement from acting in 2012), Claire Garvey, and Sylvia Syms. It is the first film of writer and director Bryan O'Neil and premiered at the Prince Charles Cinema on 6 March 2012, before going on a limited release across the United Kingdom.

The film was mostly shot over 19 days in March 2010, with two days of reshoots in August that year. The total estimated budget was £600,000.

== Plot ==
Booked Out follows the quirky exploits of the Polaroid loving artist Ailidh (Mirren Burke) as she spies and photographs the occupants of her block of flats. Jacob (Rollo Weeks), the boy next door who comes and goes quicker than Ailidh can take pictures. Jacqueline (Claire Garvey), the mysterious girl that Jacob is visiting and the slightly crazy Mrs Nicholls (Sylvia Syms) who Ailidh helps cope with her husband's continuing existence after his death.

== Cast ==
- Mirren Burke as Ailidh
- Rollo Weeks as Jacob
- Claire Garvey as Jacqueline
- Sylvia Syms as Mrs Nicholls
- Gabriela Montaraz as Treacle
- Tim FitzHigham as Bookworm Man
- Simon Selmon as Swing Dance Teacher
- Elizabeth Healey as Art Class Teacher
- Kris Abrahams as Norman
