= Igraine the Brave =

2007 novel by Cornelia Funke

- The Cover
- Author: Cornelia Funke
- Original title: Igraine Ohnefurcht
- Translator: Anthea Bell
- Language: German
- Genre: Children's, Fantasy novel
- Publisher: The Chicken House(English) Dressler (Germany)
- Publication date: January 2007
- Publication place: Germany
- English publication date: 1 October 2007
- Media type: Print (Hardback)
- Pages: 224

Igraine the Brave is a fantasy novel written by Cornelia Funke. It was released on 1 October 2007, published by The Chicken House. Originally written in German, it was translated to English by Anthea Bell.

== Plot ==
Igraine lives in an old castle with her family, magicians who possess powerful books of magic. Her older brother Albert is following in the family line, but Igraine plans to be a knight one day, even though she feels there is not much adventure to be had at home these days. Her ancestors, though, had warded off many attempts to steal the books of magic.

On her 12th birthday, Igraine's parents give her a magical suit of armor, but in the process, they are turned into pigs by mistake. Matters get worse when the next-door Baroness's castle is taken over by Osmond the Greedy, who wants to take the magical books so he can overthrow the king. Igraine and her brother must find a way to defend the castle from Osmond's siege while keeping their parents' condition secret and searching for the missing ingredient for their restoration to human form. Albert handles the castle's magical defenses while Igraine leaves to find the missing ingredient. She finds the ingredient and some assistance, in the form of the Sorrowful Knight of the Mount of Tears, who not only agrees to help her return home but also begins teaching her about the rules of chivalry, and eventually helps Igraine and her family end the siege.

== Characters ==
- Igraine – An 11-year-old girl that wanted to be a knight, on her 12th birthday she pursued her dream.
- Albert – Igraine's older brother who planned to follow his family line of magicians, possessing powerful books of magic.
- Osmond the Greedy – A selfish, evil man who moved in next door who wants to take the mythical ability from Igraine's family's powerful books of magic.
- Sir Lamorak & Fair Melisande – The rulers of Pimpernel castle and Igraine's parents who were turned into pigs.
- Garleff – A friendly giant that Igraine goes to for some hair that her parents need.
- The Sorrowful Knight of the Mount of Tears (Sir Urban of Wintergreen) – A knight that accompanies Igraine on her journey coming back to her castle.
- The Singing Books of Magic – Magical books that have been in the possession of Igraine's family for years.
- Sisyphus – Igraine's pet cat who was enchanted, giving him the ability to talk.
- Rowan Heartless – Also known as the Iron Hedgehog due to his suit of armor, which is covered with spikes. He serves as Osmond's second-in-command.
