= The Thief Lord =

2000 novel by Cornelia Funke

- English book cover by in English from Chicken House Publishing, Ltd and Scholastic.
- Author: Cornelia Funke
- Original title: Herr der Diebe
- Translator: Oliver Latsch
- Illustrator: Cornelia Funke
- Language: German
- Genre: Fantasy/adventure
- Publication place: Germany
- Pages: 345

The Thief Lord is a children's novel written by Cornelia Funke. It was published in Germany in 2000 and translated into English by Oliver Latsch in 2002 for The Chicken House, a division of Scholastic publishing company. It was Funke's first novel published in the United States and was adapted into a film in 2006.

== Plot summary ==
Orphaned and unwilling to be separated, brothers Prosper and Bo Hartleib run away to Venice where they are taken in by a group of street children led by a proud orphan named Scipio, also known as "The Thief Lord." A man calling himself the Conte asks the "Thief Lord" to steal a wooden lion's wing for him.

The runaway boys' rich but shallow aunt and uncle wish to adopt only sweet-faced Bo. They hire a detective, Victor Getz, to find them. Over the course of his investigation, Victor has several run-ins with the gang. He discovers that Scipio is actually the son of a wealthy doctor, Dr. Massimo, but the doctor is emotionally abusive, so Scipio leads a double life on the streets. Victor finds their hideout, but is ambushed and tied up by the kids, who fear he will expose them. Victor distracts the gang by sending them to Dr. Massimo's house, where they learn Scipio's secret. In the meantime, Victor escapes, leaving a note saying he would not turn them in unless they went forward with stealing the wing.

The wing belongs to a woman named Ida Spavento. At her house, Ida tells them the wing is from a magical merry-go-round, which has the ability to change a person's age. She agrees to let them have the wing if they let her accompany them to the exchange. The gang, along with Ida, goes to make the exchange the next night, leaving Bon and Caterina "Hornet" Grimani, the gang's only girl, to guard the hideout. When they return, they find Bo and Hornet gone and discover the money they received for the wing is counterfeit. With Victor's help, they find Hornet and Bo. While the others stay with Ida Spavento, Prosper and Scipio return to the Conte's island home to get the money they are owed. On the island, the Conte's sister, Morosina, catches them climbing the wall and locks them inside the stables.

The next morning, Scipio and Prosper meet the Conte and Morosina, who are now both young children. They tell him that the magical merry-go-round worked. They reveal that they were the penniless servants of the nobles who lived there, and schemed to repair the merry-go-round to reclaim childhoods that had been lost to hard labor. Scipio, who hates the vulnerability of being a child, requests a ride and comes off an adult. Just as Scipio gets off the merry-go-round, the gang's fence Barbarossa arrives, intending to take his payment. As revenge for his cruel actions, Scipio (pretending to be his father) fools him into taking a ride. Barbarossa rapidly de-ages. He breaks the merry-go-round in panic, permanently stopping its magic, but he has become a young boy. Scipio and Prosper leave after promising the Conte that they will not talk about the merry-go-round. Barbarossa will be forced to give the Conte all the money in his shop safe.

The next day, Prosper, Scipio, and Barbarossa meet up with the gang again. They do not recognize Scipio or Barbarossa and Prosper cannot explain. With Victor and Ida's help, Barbarossa is adopted by Prosper and Bo's rich aunt Esther. Prosper and Bo decide to live with Ida and go to school, along with Hornet. Esther catches Barbarossa stealing her jewelry and other possessions and sends him off to boarding school, where he becomes a menacing bully and takes over the title "Thief Lord". The adult Scipio works as Victor's assistant in his detective agency and is free from his father.

== Major characters ==
Scipio Scip Massimo: (The Thief Lord or The Lord of Thieves) Also known as "Scip", He is thirteen, has dark brown eyes and raven black hair and wears a mask that he found. Scipio is clever and quick-witted, but he is hated and abused by his father (his alias is "Fortunato").

Prosper Prop Hartlieb: Also known as "Prop", A twelve-year-old orphan and brother of Boniface. He is very caring to all his friends and especially to his younger brother. Prosper has dark hair and a very serious look on his face.

Bo Hartlieb: Bo is five-year-old orphan who ran away to Venice along with his brother, Prosper. He is described as having "blond hair and an angelic face." He admires Scipio and wants to grow up just like him, much to his brother's dismay.

Caterina Hornet Grimani: The only girl in the thief gang, she is described to be "slender, with a brown plait braided down to her hips". Her plait resembles a hornet's stinger, which is where she got her nickname, "Hornet". Hornet is an avid reader, and on occasion reads to the rest of the orphans. She is the only one of the children who is not afraid to stand up to Scipio.

Riccio Hedgehog : A runaway from an orphanage/children's home and former pickpocket of the group, he is described as "scrawny boy and at least a head shorter than Prosper, although he wasn't much younger than him". Who is nicknamed "Hedgehog" due to his brown hair always stuck out from his head in every direction, he is also noted for having bad teeth with several rotten alongside a notable gap between his front teeth.

Mosca: Abandoned by his family that no longer wanted him and group's mechanic, described as "skin was beautifully black, that it was always claimed he could hide like a shadow in the dark alleyways of the city". Wants to make enough money to finish building his boat to help in having a life on the water.

Victor Getz: A detective looking for Bo and Prosper hired by Esther and Max Hartlieb. He keeps a pair of tortoises as pets and has a number of disguises for his line of work, but slowly comes to realize that his new clients only want Bo back as a commodity than actually taking care of him and are not bothered if Prosper ends up in an orphanage. He becomes a new surrogate father for Scipio.

Ida Spavento: A nice lady who looks after the kids for a while and, at the end of the book, takes in Prosper, Bo, and Hornet. She is an orphan and grew up in an orphanage. he become a new surrogate mother for Scipio

Esther Hartlieb: Prosper and Bo's rich aunt. She wasn't particularly close to her sister and only wants Bo as he has such an angelic looking features. She regards Prosper as being too much like his mother and so couldn't care less on his outcome, whilst coming round to her husband's way of thinking in that they both should just cut their losses on both her nephews.

Maximilian Max Hartlieb: Also known as "Max", Prosper and Bo's stuffy haughty uncle. He has no time for children at all in general and is only catering to his wife's whims in having custody of Bo just to please her. He figures a dog is just as a suitable companion for Bo than a sibling and expects Bo to forget about Prosper in due time, but regards Bo as also being too much like his mother as Prosper is and thus a lost cause.

Ernesto Barbarossa: An antique dealer who loves to cheat people. He ends up riding and breaking the merry-go-round and gets stuck at an age a little younger than Bo.

Conte: Conte is the Thief Lord's first client. The Conte's real name is "Renzo".

Contessa: The Conte's younger sister. Her real name is "Morosina".

Dottor Massimo: Dottor Massimo is Scipio's disowned father.

== Reception ==
The reception of The Thief Lord among American critics was mostly positive. Kirkus Reviews and Publishers Weekly appreciated the Venetian setting and strong characters, though Publishers found fault with the pacing. Kirkus noted Ray Bradbury's Something Wicked This Way Comes as an influence via the magical carousel.

== Adaptation ==
On May 25, 2006, Warner Bros. released a film adaptation of The Thief Lord, directed by Richard Claus, starring Rollo Weeks in the title role. The film, a German-British-Luxembourg co-production with a runtime of 98 minutes, was mildly successful but suffered from comparison to adaptations of J.K. Rowling's Harry Potter series. On Rotten Tomatoes, the film has a 50% rating.
