= Inkdeath =

2007 novel by Cornelia Funke

- Inkdeath Book cover
- Author: Cornelia Funke
- Original title: Tintentod
- Translator: Anthea Bell
- Language: German
- Series: Inkheart series
- Genre: Fantasy, Bildungsroman
- Publisher: Germany Cecilie Dressler; UK Chicken House; United States Scholastic
- Publication date: 28 September 2007
- Publication place: Germany
- Pages: 683 / 699 on hardcover edition
- Preceded by: Inkspell
- Followed by: The Color of Revenge

Inkdeath (German: Tintentod) is a 2007 young adult fantasy novel by Cornelia Funke. It is the third novel in the Inkheart series, following Inkheart and Inkspell.

== Plot summary ==
The plot begins a few weeks after the events of Inkspell, with Farid and Meggie's mission of resurrecting Dustfinger, who died at the end of Inkspell.

Inkdeath begins with the now immortal, but slowly decaying, Adderhead, ruler of the southern part of the Inkworld, his brother-in-law Milksop, the king of Ombra, and his right-hand man, The Piper, ruling over the city of Ombra and its small surrounding villages. The three Folcharts, Meggie, Resa, and Mortimer, along with an unborn Folchart child, live on an abandoned farm. Farid, who gave up his fire after Dustfinger's death, works for Orpheus, who treats him like a slave while promising that he will read a dead Dustfinger back to life. Meanwhile, Fenoglio has given up writing and become drunk and senile. He resents that Orpheus is changing Inkworld and asking questions about the "White Women". Ombra is under constant threat by Adderhead's men, who have killed nearly every young adult male in the city and regularly kidnap children to work in the mines. The only one opposing them is the "Bluejay", who is actually Mortimer.

Meanwhile, Orpheus, who has been changing the story, calls a meeting of the robber graveyard to have the Bluejay resurrect Dustfinger and die in the process. Mortimer agrees and summons the White Women, who brings him to the world of the dead for three days. During this time, Meggie believes he is dead and becomes furious with both Farid and her mother, Resa. In the world of the dead, Mortimer meets Death, who makes a bargain with him: he will release him and Dustfinger as long as he finishes what he started and writes the three words in the White Book. If he is unsuccessful, Death will take him, Dustfinger, and Meggie, as she helped to bind the White Book. He awakens from the world of death and brings Dustfinger, who no longer has his scars, with him.

He finds himself enjoying the Bluejay role and has no intention of leaving Inkworld despite Meggie and Resa's urgings. Meggie finds herself distanced from Farid and drawn to Doria, a member of the Black Prince's robber camp. Meanwhile, The Piper kidnaps nearly all of Ombra's children and threatens to take them to the mines. Mortimer, now known almost exclusively as the Bluejay, frees them by giving himself up in exchange. He discovers that the Adderhead's daughter, Violante, known as Her Ugliness, wishes to take his side in the matter. She gets him back safely to the robbers' camp while keeping her allegiance secret from The Piper and her son Jacopo, a follower of the Adderhead and admirer of the Piper. The Milksop goes after the group of robbers, but Fenoglio saves them by writing giant human nests in the trees.

Mortimer goes off in secret with Dustfinger, Violante, and her child soldiers to the castle in the lake, where the White Book is kept. Meanwhile, Orpheus now works for Adderhead and is plagued by visits from a now insane Mortola, who still seeks the return of her dead son, Capricorn. Mortimer's plan goes awry and he, Dustfinger, and Brianna, Dustfinger's daughter, are all imprisoned. Resa arrives in the form of a Swift, saves Mortimer from going insane, and restates Dustfinger's allegiance. Resa and Dustfinger search for The White Book while Mortimer, who has captured by the Piper, works to create a new White Book for the Adderhead. Jacopo betrays his grandfather, the Adderhead, by giving Mo the original White Book so he can write the three words, killing the Adderhead.

Inkdeath concludes as Orpheus retreats and flees to the northern mountains, Fenoglio begins writing again, and Farid decides to go traveling with his regained power of fire, asking if Meggie would join him. Meggie, now in love with Doria, bids Farid farewell. Violante, now known as Her Kindliness, becomes ruler of Ombra, and a new Folchart, a boy, is born into Inkworld, longing to visit the world that his parents and sister are from.

== Critical reception ==
Critical reception for Inkdeath has been mixed to negative. Publishers Weekly said, "The interesting meta-fictional questions—can we alter destiny? shape our own fate?—are overwhelmed by the breakneck action, yet the villains aren't fully realized. More disappointingly, the formerly feisty Meggie, barely into her teens, has little to do but choose between two suitors. Funke seems to have forgotten her original installment was published for children". Kirkus Reviews was slightly more positive, saying that "Funke's storytelling is as compelling as ever", but all the same agreeing that "the natural audience for this brooding saga seems, sadly, to be teens and up and not the children who so eagerly responded to Inkheart".
