= Inkspell =

2005 young adult fantasy novel by Cornelia Funke

- First English edition cover
- Author: Cornelia Funke
- Original title: Tintenblut
- Translator: Anthea Bell
- Language: German
- Series: Inkheart series
- Genre: Fantasy
- Publisher: Meredith
- Publication date: 1 October 2005
- Publication place: Germany
- Media type: Print (Hardback and Paperback)
- Pages: 635 (first Eng. edition, hardback)
- ISBN: 0-439-55400-4 (first Eng. edition, hardback)
- OCLC: 183445016
- LC Class: PZ7.F96624 Ins 2005
- Preceded by: Inkheart
- Followed by: Inkdeath

Inkspell (German: Tintenblut) is a 2005 young adult fantasy novel by Cornelia Funke, translated by Anthea Bell. It was named the 2006 Book Sense Book of the Year in the Children's Literature category.

Inkspell is the second novel in Cornelia Funke's Inkheart series. The first novel, Inkheart (2003), was critically acclaimed and was made into a major motion picture released in January 2009. The third novel, Inkdeath, was published on 28 September 2007 in Germany. Funke acknowledged in a 2006 interview that Inkspell, as the middle book in the trilogy, was darker than the other two volumes, and ended on a cliffhanger.

While the English title is "Inkspell", the direct German translation would be "Inkblood". In Inkdeath, the books' names are directly addressed, translating the three regarding words directly (heart, blood, death).

== Plot summary ==
A year has passed, and Meggie now lives with Elinor, Darius and her parents, Mortimer and Resa. Life is peaceful, but she often thinks of Inkheart and its characters, who came to life. Meanwhile, Dustfinger still seeks to return to his home world. After meeting Orpheus, a crooked storyteller who, like Mortimer, has the ability to read and write stories to life, he asks to be read back. Orpheus obliges, but does not send Dustfinger's apprentice, Farid, back into the book as they arranged. Instead, Orpheus steals the book and hands it over to Basta, who seeks revenge for the death of his master Capricorn. Distraught, Farid goes in search of Meggie, but both are caught inside the book.

Soon after, Mortola, Basta, Orpheus, and a "man built like a wardrobe" barge into Elinor's house and capture Mortimer, Resa, Elinor, and Darius. As per Mortola's orders, Orpheus reads Basta, Mortola, and Mo into Inkheart, but accidentally brings Resa with him. Upon entry, Mortola shoots Mortimer with a shotgun that he brought from our world, and Resa discovers that her voice has returned as she prays for his survival. As he recovers, he and Resa hide in a secret cave with the strolling players, or the Motley Folk. They assume that Mortimer is the mysterious gentleman-robber, the "Bluejay", a fictitious hero from a song created by Fenoglio's words. Fenoglio has been living within his own story since the events of Inkheart, working as a court scribe in Lombrica's capital city of Ombra. After reuniting with Meggie, Fenoglio asks her to read Cosimo the Fair back into the story, since he died when he did not plan for him to. Meggie is reluctant to interfere with the story, but Fenoglio convinces her that it will be 'a double' of Cosimo - not Cosimo himself. Meggie reads Cosmio in, only for the Adderhead's soldiers to attack the fair, injuring and killing many people. Cosimo has none of his memories and seemingly does not love his wife and child anymore. Cosimo's return upsets the Adderhead, ruler of the neighboring region of Argenta, who planned to take over Lombrica after the Laughing Prince's death. With the rightful heir to the throne of Ombra mysteriously resurrected, but with no memories of his life, war is imminent.

The Adderhead's men capture Mortimer and Resa along with many other strolling players in the cave, having been sold out by one of their own. Meggie joins Dustfinger and Farid in searching for her parents and the strolling players. Along with the Black Prince, the leader of the Motley Folk, they launch a successful rescue mission, but Mortimer is unable to escape because of his wound and Resa stays behind with him. Meanwhile, Cosimo's double is killed in battle along with most of Ombra's men. Meggie goes to the Adderhead's Castle of Night and, fulfilling a prophecy she and Fenoglio dreamed up and "read" into reality, offers him a bargain: Mortimer, will bind the Adderhead a book of immortality if he releases Meggie, Resa, Mortimer, and the other prisoners. However, they do not tell them that if the words "Heart", "Spell", and "Death" are written in the book, the person who signed their name in the book to gain immortality will die. In disbelief, his lieutenant Firefox, is chosen to test it. Firefox is made immortal, as he survives a fatal stabbing, but Taddeo, the Adderhead's librarian, kills him by writing the three words in the book. The words are then erased and replaced by the Adderhead's name, consequently making him invincible. Mortimer takes Firefox's sword, feeling a strange coldness within him; he believes his anger and sadness are changing him into a different person.

The Adderhead decides, as celebration for his wife giving birth to a healthy son, that the prisoners will be released from his cells, but the Black Prince suspects that he instead plans to sell the prisoners into slavery. Together, the robbers plan to free the prisoners. Mortimer learns to fight during the raid led by Basta. Basta kills Farid by throwing a knife at his back, the death Fenoglio had originally planned for Dustfinger, only for Mortimer to kill him.

Later, while mourning Farid's death, Dustfinger asks Meggie if she would like to have Farid back. When Meggie agrees, he sends her to Roxanne to tell her "he will always find his way back to her". Roxanne realizes Dustfinger's plan, but is too late and watches as the White Women, the Inkworld's Angels of Death, take Dustfinger. Farid is resurrected in Dustfinger's place as Meggie reads Orpheus to the Inkworld to resurrect Dustfinger. Orpheus convinces Farid to become his servant, claiming that it will help him resurrect Dustfinger.

== Adaptations ==
The audiobook, published by Random House Listening Library, is read by Brendan Fraser, who played Mortimer in the movie adaptation. It is approximately 18 hours and 50 minutes long across 16 disks.
