= Sweet/Vicious =

American television series

- Genre: Action; Black comedy; Buddy comedy; Comedy drama; Rape and revenge
- Created by: Jennifer Kaytin Robinson
- Starring: Eliza Bennett; Taylor Dearden; Brandon Mychal Smith; Nick Fink
- Composer: Alec Puro
- Country of origin: United States
- Original language: English
- No. of seasons: 1
- No. of episodes: 10

Production
- Executive producers: Stacey Sher; Jennifer Kaytin Robinson; Amanda Lasher
- Cinematography: Steve Gainer
- Editor: Scott Gregory
- Running time: 38–41 minutes
- Production company: Shiny Penny

Original release
- Network: MTV
- Release: November 15, 2016 – January 24, 2017

Sweet/Vicious is an American rape and revenge buddy comedy drama television series created by Jennifer Kaytin Robinson for MTV. The series revolves around the activities of Jules and Ophelia, two college students who secretly act as vigilantes on-campus and target sexual assailants.

The Hollywood Reporter announced on September 8, 2015, that MTV had ordered a pilot for the series, which was originally titled Little Darlings. On December 14, 2015, Deadline Hollywood announced that MTV had given a series order to the show. On April 21, 2016, MTV announced that the series would be on their new show lineup with the final title of Sweet/Vicious.

Filming for the series began on May 4, 2016. The show premiered on MTV and the MTV app on November 15, 2016.

On April 28, 2017, MTV announced that Sweet/Vicious had been cancelled after one season.

== Plot ==
Jules Thomas is a preppy seeming sorority sister at Darlington University, while secretly a vigilante hunting and beating rapists on Campus. During one of her outings, Jules is attacked and nearly killed by a rapist named Carter, but is saved by Ophelia Mayer, a stoner girl living off her trust fund. After Carter is killed, Jules, despite her obvious differences from Ophelia, quickly bonds with her. Jules tells Ophelia about how Darlington has a problem with sexual violence occurring across the community, and the law refusing to do anything about it. Jules takes Ophelia under her wing and the two form a vigilante duo to go after Darlington's rapists.

It is revealed the year before that Jules was raped by Nate Griffin, the boyfriend of Jules sorority leader and best friend Kennedy. Jules is traumatized by the incident, unable to tell anyone the truth, and Nate continues to hold the incident over her head. Jules also hooks up with a boy named Tyler, before finding out he's Carter's stepbrother, and is looking for Carter. Ophelia reveals she has a strained relationship with her mother, as the two seemingly bond when Ophelia infiltrates a sorority house; said house has been making torture porn based on the sexual abuse and hazing they put new girls through. When Jules and Ophelia topple the house, Ophelia's mother leaves, showing she cared more about the sorority than actually bonding with her daughter.

Jules and Ophelia go after a serial rapist, Landon Mayes, the son of Darlington's president. The outing goes wrong when Ophelia almost gets raped and the vigilantes are caught on camera. The campus goes on lockdown, and Jules and Ophelia take to hiding in a record store along with Tyler, Nate, and Ophelia's friend Harris. During the fiasco, Jules snaps and finally confronts Nate about her rape; unfortunately, Tyler thinks there's something happening between her and Nate, and Nate goes to Kennedy confessing to "cheating" on her with Jules. With Jules having a falling-out with Kennedy, she moves in with Ophelia.

Meanwhile, Harris, a law student who takes legal matters seriously, gets involved with campus security, hoping to expose the vigilantes. During a party, the attempts to expose the vigilante backfire when Jules batters a rapist to the point of near death and gets into an argument with Ophelia about letting her anger get the best of her. Nate in the meantime, manages to win Kennedy over. Despite having a falling-out with Jules, Ophelia stands up for her to Kennedy by revealing Nate raped Jules. Kennedy ultimately breaks up with Nate and sides with Jules, much to Nate's ire.

It's revealed that in the year before, Jules was once friends with Nate and had to keep an eye on him at a party while Kennedy was sick. When Jules gets drunk and goes to take a nap, Nate took advantage of her and raped her. When Jules tried to report him, the administration tried to gaslight her due Nate's reputation. Witnessing how much injustice happened on campus is what put Jules on her path. In the present, Jules and Ophelia reconcile; Ophelia also reconciles with Harris; and Jules reconciles with Tyler and Kennedy. With the encouragement and help of her friends, Jules comes forward with her account, but despite evidence and testimony, the college refuses to do anything about Nate, and much of the student body takes Nate's side. To make things worse, Tyler is blamed and arrested for Carter's murder.

With Nate about to accept an award at a campus celebration, Jules and Ophelia are reached out to by Nate's friend Miles, who disowned Nate and revealed he raped one other girl in the past who was silenced. Miles helps acquire Nate's confession while the latter was on a drug fueled rant about rape victims deserving what they get. Jules and Ophelia play the recording at the ceremony, ruining Nate's reputation. Ophelia manages to frame a child molester who got off on a technicality for Carter's murder, but Tyler is still shaken up by his step brothers murder. Nate is approached by Landon Mayes, proposing they team up against the vigilantes. Harris becomes disillusioned by the law refusing to help victims to preserve Darlington's reputation, and opts to side with Jules and Ophelia. In the meantime, Jules and Ophelia are considered heroes for fighting injustice and many people reach out to them for help.

== Cast ==
=== Main ===
- Eliza Bennett as Jules Thomas
- Taylor Dearden as Ophelia Mayer
- Brandon Mychal Smith as Harris James
- Nick Fink as Tyler Finn

=== Recurring ===
- Dylan McTee as Nate Griffin
- Aisha Dee as Kennedy Cates
- Skyler Day as Mackenzie Dalton
- Victoria Park as Gaby Cho
- Lindsay Chambers as Fiona Price
- Matt Angel as Officer Mike Veach
- Stephen Friedrich as Evan
- Greg Worswick as Barton
- Ethan Dawes as Miles Forrester
- Max Ehrich as Landon Mays
- Corinne Foxx as Rachel
- Drew Hellenthal as Tommy Cope
- James MacDonald as Officer Ballard
- Carter Jenkins as Will Powell
- Gerald Downey as Coach Howard

== Episodes ==
No.	Title	Directed by	Written by	Original release date	US viewers (millions)
1	"The Blueprint"	Joseph Kahn; Rebecca Thomas	Jennifer Kaytin Robinson	November 15, 2016	0.27
Jules, the perfect sorority sister, balances her life of being a college student while also serving up vigilante justice on her school's campus. That is until Ophelia, a computer-hacking weed dealer, discovers Jules' secret.
2	"The Writing's on the Wall"	Joseph Kahn	Jennifer Kaytin Robinson	November 22, 2016	0.18
In light of recent events, Jules ceases her vigilante activities, but when Ophelia shows her how so many girls are also suffering from sexual assault on campus, Jules agrees to continue to fight for revenge with Ophelia.
3	"Sucker"	Brian Dannelly	Amanda Lasher	November 29, 2016	0.14
After Jules trains Ophelia to become a vigilante, they take on their first target together: a boy using a popular dating app to find his victims.
4	"Tragic Kingdom"	Brian Dannelly	Celeste Ballard	December 6, 2016	0.19
In order to take down an evil sorority that is brutally hazing their pledges, Ophelia begrudgingly goes undercover in an attempt to dismantle the sorority from the inside.
5	"All Eyez on Me"	Todd Biermann	M. Scott Veach	December 13, 2016	0.14
Jules and Ophelia plan to takedown a rideshare driver who assaults his drunk and defenseless passengers. After the initial plan goes awry, Ophelia takes matters into her own hands.
6	"Fearless"	Todd Biermann	Jared Frieder	January 3, 2017	0.17
Ophelia and Jules hole up in the record store with Harris and Tyler when an unexpected visitor sends their night into a tailspin.
7	"Heartbreaker"	Elodie Keene	Jennifer Kaytin Robinson	January 10, 2017	0.14
In the aftermath of Jules' confession to Kennedy, Jules attempts to dig herself out of her depression by joining Ophelia and Harris on a campus bar crawl.
8	"Back to Black"	Elodie Keene	Jared Frieder & Celeste Ballard	January 17, 2017	0.16
With nothing left to lose, Jules sets her sights on a public takedown at a frat party. Ophelia, hesitant to let an emotionally unstable Jules pursue a takedown, reluctantly follows suit.
9	"An Innocent Man"	Andrew Young	Amanda Lasher	January 24, 2017	0.24
Jules, having reconciled with Kennedy, finally reports her sexual assault to the Darlington Title IX office for a proper trial, forcing everyone involved to rehash the events of that night.
10	"Pure Heroine"	Andrew Young	Jennifer Kaytin Robinson	January 24, 2017	0.18
In the wake of Nate's guilty verdict being overturned by the President of Darlington and Tyler's arrest, the girls have a lot to take care of.

== Critical reception ==
Despite the low ratings, the show received positive reviews, and has a 100% rating on Rotten Tomatoes based on reviews from 20 critics.
