= The Thief Lord (film) =

- German theatrical release poster
- Directed by: Richard Claus
- Written by: Richard Claus; Daniel Musgrave
- Based on: The Thief Lord by Cornelia Funke
- Produced by: Richard Claus
- Starring: Aaron Johnson; Jasper Harris; Alice Connor; Rollo Weeks; George MacKay
- Cinematography: David Slama
- Edited by: Peter R. Adam
- Music by: Nigel Clarke; Michael Csányi-Wills
- Production companies: Comet Film; Warner Bros. Film Productions Germany; Delux Productions; Future Films
- Distributed by: Warner Bros. Pictures
- Release dates: 5 January 2006 (Germany); 26 May 2006 (United Kingdom)
- Running time: 98 minutes
- Countries: Germany; Luxembourg; United Kingdom
- Language: English
- Box office: $5.1 million

The Thief Lord (German: Herr der Diebe) is a 2006 German-British family drama film written and directed by Richard Claus and co-written by Daniel Musgrave, based on the 2000 novel of the same title, by German author Cornelia Funke. It was a joint production of Warner Bros. Pictures, Future Films Limited, Comet Film, and Thema Production and is distributed by Warner Bros. under their Family Entertainment label.

The film follows two recently orphaned brothers, Bo (Jasper Harris) and Prosper (Aaron Johnson), dumped in the care of a cruel aunt and uncle, who escape their impending separation by running off to Venice. Hiding in the canals and alleyways of the city, the boys are befriended by a gang of young urchins and their enigmatic masked leader, the Thief Lord (Rollo Weeks).

== Plot ==
When Prosper and Boniface's parents die, their aunt Esther plans to adopt six-year-old Bo and send 12-year-old Prosper away to boarding school. But before she can separate the two, Prosper takes Bo to Venice, the city about which their mother had often told them stories. In Venice, the boys meet the Thief Lord, a mask-wearing teenager named Scipio. The Thief Lord invites the boys to come to his hideout, an abandoned cinema called the Stella, which is also home to three orphaned children Scipio has rescued: Hornet, Riccio, and Mosca. Meanwhile, the boys' aunt and uncle, Esther and Max Hartlieb have traveled to Venice to find their nephews and hired Victor Getz to help.

Scipio's newest client, a mysterious man known as the Conte, asks them to steal a wooden wing, a fragment of the long-lost merry-go-round of the Merciful Sisters. Scipio asks the gang to help stake out the mansion where the wing is kept while he goes away for a few days. Getz discovers that Scipio is not a poor orphan at all, but the son of the wealthy Dr. Massimo. When Scipio doesn't show up for the stakeout the next day, the gang is confused. They find out that Scipio has lied to them about being an orphan and that all his 'loot' is from his father's house.

When the gang go to steal the wooden wing, they accidentally wake the owner of the house, Ida Spavento. Ida agrees to let them take the wing so long as she comes with them. She takes them to the convent of the Merciful Sisters, where they learn the mystical secret of the merry-go-round: children who ride it become adults, and adults become children. Scipio takes them all on a boat to meet the Conte. The transaction goes off without a hitch.

Barbarossa, the antique dealer who serves as the gang's fence, leads police to the Stella, where they take Hornet and Bo and close down the Stella. Prosper and the others return to find Hornet and Bo gone. Thinking Getz sold them out, they confront him. Getz insists he is on their side. Ida and Getz get Hornet from the Merciful Sisters, with whom the police have left her, and Ida allows the gang to stay at her place. That night, Scipio sneaks out of his father's mansion and persuades Prosper to come with him to ride the merry-go-round and become an adult.

Bo returns to the Stella. Getz finds Bo and brings him back to Ida's house. Meanwhile, the Conte and his sister the Contessa are now children, having ridden the merry-go-round. The Conte offers a ride on the merry-go-round as payment in lieu of money. Scipio and Barbarossa take the offer. Scipio becomes an adult and Barbarossa a young child.

Prosper is reunited with Bo. The now-adult Scipio becomes Getz's new partner in the detective business. The aunt and uncle try to snatch Bo until Scipio returns and forces them out at gunpoint. Riccio and Mosca take the money they deserve from Barbarossa's safe and split it amongst the gang. Scipio uses his share to buy the boys a boat and establishes bank accounts for the others. In the final scene, Victor, Ida, Prosper, Hornet, and Bo are on Scipio's old boat. Ida comments that they would make a great family.

== Cast ==
- Aaron Johnson as Prosper, the protagonist and member of Scipio's gang.
- Jasper Harris as Boniface "Bo", Prosper's younger brother.
- Alice Connor as Caterina "Hornet" Grimani, the only female member of the thieves.
- Rollo Weeks as Scipio "The Thief Lord" Massimo, a rich boy who pretends to be orphaned and a great thief.
- George MacKay as Riccio, one of Scipio's thieves.
- Lathaniel Dyer as Mosca, one of Scipio's thieves.
- Jim Carter as Victor Getz, a detective and friend of Ida.
- Caroline Goodall as Ida Spavento, a photographer who helps the thieves
- Alexei Sayle as Ernesto Barbarossa, a sly, greedy, and rude shopkeeper.
- Carole Boyd as Esther Hartlieb, Prosper and Bo's snobby aunt.
- Bob Goody as Max Hartlieb, Prosper and Bo's uncle.
- Geoffrey Hutchings as Conte, a man who employs the gang.
- Anita Wright as Contessa, the Conte's sister.
- Poppy Rogers as Morosina
- Robert Bathurst as Dottore Massimo, Scipio's selfish rich father.
- Vanessa Redgrave as Sister Antonia
- Margaret Tyzack as Mother Superior

== Release ==
=== Home media ===
The film was released on DVD by Warner Home Video on 14 March 2006. The one-disc edition includes a theatrical trailer that ran in theatres in Europe and Mosca's cartoon from the film by itself.

== Reception ==
The film has a 50% rating on Rotten Tomatoes. Will Wade of Common Sense Media awarded the film four stars out of five. Neil Smith of the BBC awarded the film two stars out of five. Jo Berry of Empire awarded it two stars. Damon Smith of the Bournemouth Daily Echo awarded the film three stars. Sloan Freer of Radio Times awarded the film two stars out of five.
