= Ileen Maisel =

American-born film producer (1955–2024)

Ileen Maisel (April 6, 1955 – February 16, 2024) was an American-born film producer, living in the United Kingdom. In 2009, she was one of the founders of Amber Entertainment. Previously, she was Senior Vice President of European Production for New Line Cinema. She was nominated for the 1999 Alexander Korda Award for BAFTA Award for Best Film for Onegin. She died in London on February 16, 2024, at the age of 68.

== Filmography ==
- Twelfth Night: Or What You Will (1996) – Executive Producer
- Onegin (1999) – Producer
- Ripley's Game (2002) – Producer
- Birth (2004) – Executive Producer
- The Golden Compass (2007) – Executive Producer
- Inkheart (2008) – Executive Producer
- Molly Moon and the Incredible Book of Hypnotism (2015) – Producer
