= Inkheart =

2003 young adult fantasy novel by Cornelia Funke

- First English translation edition cover
- Author: Cornelia Funke
- Original title: Tintenherz
- Translator: Anthea Bell
- Illustrator: Cornelia Funke
- Cover artist: Carol Lawson; Ian Butterworth
- Language: German
- Series: Inkheart series
- Genre: Fantasy, Bildungsroman, Mystery
- Publisher: Cecilie Dressler (Germany); Chicken House (UK); Scholastic (US)
- Publication date: September 23, 2003
- Publication place: Germany
- English publication date: June 6, 2003
- Media type: Print (Hardback & Paperback)
- Pages: 534 pages
- ISBN: 1-904442-09-9 (1st English translation)
- OCLC: 52783756
- Followed by: Inkspell

Inkheart (German: Tintenherz) is a 2003 young adult fantasy novel by Cornelia Funke, and is the first book of the Inkheart series, with Inkspell (2005) and Inkdeath (2007) succeeding it. The novel became one of the finalists of 2004 BookSense Book of the Year Award for Children's Literature and won the Flicker Tale Children's Book Award in 2006. Based on a 2007 online poll, the National Education Association listed the book as one of its "Teachers' Top 100 Books for Children".

Inkheart was the first part of a trilogy and was continued with Inkspell (2005), which won Funke a BookSense Book of the Year Award for Children's Literature in 2006. The trilogy was initially concluded with Inkdeath, but was revived in 2016 when Funke announced that a sequel called The Color of Revenge (German: Die Farbe der Rache) would be published in 2018 in Germany. By 2020, the book remained unpublished, although Funke announced that the first fifteen chapters would be published digitally that same year, with subsequent chapters published periodically. The physical edition of the book was released on October 12, 2023 in Germany.

Following the release of the first Inkheart novel, New Line Cinema bought the film-rights to all three books for a film-adaptation. The film is directed by Iain Softley based on a screenplay by David Lindsay-Abaire. It features an ensemble cast that includes Brendan Fraser, Helen Mirren, Paul Bettany, Jim Broadbent, Rafi Gavron, Andy Serkis, and newcomer Eliza Bennett, among others. Upon release, the film received mixed reviews. In 2009, a video-game based on the film was released for the Nintendo DS.

== Plot ==
Twelve-year-old Meggie lives with her father, Mortimer, who works as a bookbinder. One night, a man named Dustfinger visits Mortimer, and Meggie overhears him telling him that a man named Capricorn is looking for him. The next morning, Mortimer unexpectedly announces that he and Meggie have to go to her Aunt Elinor's house because he has to fix some books. Dustfinger accompanies them, and Meggie is introduced to his pet marten, Gwin. Some time later, Mortimer is captured and brings a book, Inkheart, with him.

Dustfinger, Meggie, and Elinor are taken to Capricorn's house, where Mortimer is, only to find Capricorn was waiting for them. Elinor and Meggie are thrown into the cell where Mortimer is being held captive and reunite with him, while Dustfinger disappears. Meggie makes Mortimer tell the story of why they were there.

The background: In the past, Mortimer was reading Inkheart to Meggie's mother, Teresa, and learned he had the special gift to bring things out of books by reading aloud. However, this came with a price: For everything that comes out of the book, something must go in. So, while reading, three of the book's main characters, Capricorn, Basta, and Dustfinger, emerged from the book. Capricorn tried to fight Mortimer, but eventually he forced them out of his house. However, Teresa and their cats had vanished. He tried to get her out of the book, but failed.

Capricorn makes Mortimer read aloud; when he starts to read Tales from the thousand and one Nights, a boy named Farid appears from it and is also imprisoned. That night, Dustfinger breaks out the prisoners.

Elinor returns home while Dustfinger, Farid, Meggie, and Mortimer go to visit Fenoglio, the author of Inkheart, since Capricorn had burned all copies of the book except his own, but learn that he does not have another copy. Fenoglio offers them an apartment so that they can live there for the time being while Mortimer fixes Fenoglio's books. Mortimer, on an urgent call from Elinor, goes to the airport, leaving Meggie with Fenoglio and his three grandchildren. Capricorn's men capture Fenoglio and Meggie and imprison them in an attic in Capricorn's house, where Meggie discovers she has Mortimer's power.

Farid and Dustfinger sneak into the village, where Dustfinger meets one of his old friends, Resa, a mute who emerged from the Inkheart story some time ago. Resa and Dustfinger conspire a plan to reclaim Inkheart from Capricorn, but are caught. Fenoglio then starts writing a counter curse for when Meggie has to read out a villain called the Shadow.

Elinor and Mo arrive at the village, but Elinor is caught and put in the crypt with Resa and Dustfinger. Meggie asks to see Dustfinger and learns that Resa is her mother. Farid and Mortimer set Capricorn's house on fire while Meggie switches out the planned reading for Fenoglio's story. She creates the Shadow and turns it against its master. Mortimer reads the beginning of the last paragraph, killing Capricorn. Meggie then finishes the tale and the Shadow turns back into the fairies, glass men, and trolls whose ashes it was created from. Many of the magical creatures come home with Elinor. Meggie, Mortimer, and Resa, go to live at Elinor's house. Gwin, Dustfinger, and Farid leave in the night after Dustfinger steals the last remaining copy of Inkheart from Mortimer.

== Characters ==
- Meggie Folchart: A 12-year-old avid reader and the daughter of Mortimer "Silvertongue" Folchart, who inherited his love for books and shares his ability to read things out of them. She has blonde hair and blue eyes.
- Mortimer "Mo" Folchart/Silvertongue: Meggie's father. He has the ability to read characters and things out of stories. He is Resa's husband, who got read into the book Inkheart when he accidentally read Capricorn and Basta out along with Dustfinger.
- Dustfinger: A character from the book Inkheart, who Mortimer read out of the book. Dustfinger is a skilled performer who works with fire, therefore known as a fire-eater. He has a horned marten called Gwin as his companion. He is described to have sandy-colored hair and three faint scars on his face, a result of being cut by Basta. He seeks Inkheart as it is the only way back to his world. He betrayed Mortimer by selling him out to Capricorn because he had promised he would be sent back home.
- Capricorn: A character from Inkheart that Mortimer read out of the book and the main antagonist. A mob boss who has a tall, gaunt stature, pale skin, short bristly hair, and pale eyes. He only cares about himself, and does not want to return to his own world and time. When he was a child, he was beaten if he cried or showed pity, which led to his evil nature.
- Gwin: Dustfinger's horned pet marten, who lives in his backpack.
- Elinor Loredan: The aunt of Teresa, a recluse proud of her collection of books. At first, she is somewhat rude to Meggie, as she fears that she will ruin her books, but warms up to her after realizing they have a shared love of books.
- Basta: A character from Inkheart. He has a thin, angular face and narrow shoulders. He is serious and superstitious. Unlike Capricorn's other men, who wear black, Basta wears white. He wields a knife, which he is fond of.
- Flatnose: One of Capricorn's henchmen, who Darius read out of Inkheart. He has a tall, broad stature.
- Darius: A nervous man who is no older than Mortimer and wears glasses. Capricorn discovered he can also read characters out of books, but as a result of his stuttering, the characters have various deformities.
- Farid: A young boy read out from the book Tales from the Thousand and One Nights. He later becomes a companion of Dustfinger and becomes skilled at "playing with fire". He also develops a soft spot for Meggie.
- Fenoglio: The author of Inkheart. He has three grandchildren: Ricco, Paula, and Pippo.
- Mortola (the Magpie): Read out of Inkheart by Darius. She has a vulture-like face and legs wrapped in bandages. According to Basta, she is cruel.
- The Shadow: A creature that only appears when Capricorn calls it. It is made from the ashes of the creatures Capricorn burned.
- Teresa "Resa" Folchart: Mortimer's wife, Meggie's mother, and Elinor's niece. She disappeared into the book when Mortimer first read Dustfinger, Basta, and Capricorn out of it. Later, it is revealed she is alive, but lost her voice.

== Critical reception ==
Kirkus Reviews declared it "a true feast for anyone who has ever been lost in a book". Writing in The Guardian, Diana Wynne Jones stated "I don't think I've ever read anything that conveys so well the joys, terrors, and pitfalls of reading".

== Sequels ==
The sequel Inkspell was released on October 1, 2005. The third book in the trilogy, Inkdeath, was released on September 28, 2007.

== Film adaptation ==
Following the release of the first Inkheart novel, New Line Cinema bought the film-rights to all three books for a cinema adaptation. Funke moved to Los Angeles in 2005 after she had accepted the offer to participate as the film's producer alongside Barry Mendel. Principal photography on the Inkheart film began in 2006.

Directed by Iain Softley, the film is based on a screenplay by David Lindsay-Abaire and features an ensemble cast that includes Brendan Fraser, Helen Mirren, Paul Bettany, Jim Broadbent, Rafi Gavron, Andy Serkis, and newcomer Eliza Bennett, among others. Upon release, the film received mixed reviews. In 2009, a video-game based on the film was released for the Nintendo DS.
