= Kalbacher Klapperschlange =

German literary award

Kalbacher Klapperschlange is a german children's literary prize. It was established by author Regina Rusch in 1988 and was Germany's first children's book prize. The jury is made up of children and the prize is awarded annually.

== Background ==
The Kalbacher Klapperschlange was Germany's first book prize awarded by a jury only consisting of children. The sponsoring association "Kinderverein Kalbach" as well as the award itself were established by the German author Regina Rusch. The Kalbacher Klapperschlange has established itself as a positive evaluation criterion for publishers and other institutions. References to the award are made both on the covers of winning books and when the authors and collaborators are introduced.

== Jury and evaluation ==
The children’s jury is made up of children and adolescents aged 8 to 14 years who have read and rated at least five books out of the 60 participants. The books are divided into three age groups: eight years and older, 10 years and older and 12 years and above. Only novels for children between the ages of 8 and 14 published in the previous year are eligible to participate in the Kalbacher Klapperschlange. The evaluation is based on both content-related criteria (understanding, traceability, tension) and formal aspects (design and legibility).

== Awards ceremonies ==
The prize is awarded every autumn at the local children's book fair. In addition to the prize, the Kalbacher Klapperschlange, the winner receives a review booklet with the ratings of all participants. Originally the prize was a wooden rattlesnake. From 2001 to 2020 a metal snake was designed by a local artist. Since 2021, an artist living in Bad Homburg has been commissioned to design the price. He adjusts the price individually to the winning book. Author Cornelia Funke, who previously won the award in 1998, 2001 and 2004, called it one of her favorite awards. She, Elke Heidenreich, Isabel Abedi, Paul Maar, Sabine Ludwig and Jochen Till, as well as many other German authors, visited the book fair to read from their books.

== Award winners ==
A list of all winners can be found on the homepage of the Kalbacher Klapperschlange.
