= Inkheart (film) =

2008 film by Iain Softley

- Theatrical release poster
- Directed by: Iain Softley
- Screenplay by: David Lindsay-Abaire
- Based on: Inkheart by Cornelia Funke
- Produced by: Cornelia Funke; Ileen Maisel; Dylan Cuva; Sarah Wang; Iain Softley; Ute Leonhardt; Toby Emmerich; Mark Ordesky; Andrew Licht
- Starring: Brendan Fraser; Paul Bettany; Helen Mirren; Jim Broadbent; Andy Serkis; Eliza Hope Bennett; Rafi Gavron
- Cinematography: Roger Pratt
- Edited by: Martin Walsh
- Music by: Javier Navarrete
- Production companies: New Line Cinema; Internationale Filmproduktion Blackbird Erste
- Distributed by: Warner Bros. Pictures (International); Entertainment Film Distributors (United Kingdom); Eagle Pictures (Italy)
- Release dates: December 11, 2008 (Germany); December 12, 2008 (United Kingdom); January 23, 2009 (United States)
- Running time: 106 minutes
- Countries: Germany; United Kingdom; United States; Italy
- Language: English
- Budget: $60 million
- Box office: $62.4 million

Inkheart is a 2008 fantasy adventure film directed by Iain Softley, produced by Cornelia Funke, Dylan Cuva, Sarah Wang, Ute Leonhardt, Toby Emmerich, Mark Ordesky, Ileen Maisel and Andrew Licht, written by David Lindsay-Abaire, music composed by Javier Navarrete and starring Brendan Fraser, Paul Bettany, Helen Mirren, Jim Broadbent, Andy Serkis, and Eliza Bennett. It is based on Cornelia Funke's 2003 novel of the same name.

Produced by New Line Cinema, the film was released theatrically on December 12, 2008, in the UK and January 23, 2009, in the US by Warner Bros. Pictures. Inkheart received mixed reviews from critics and grossed $62,450,361 on a $60 million budget.

Inkheart was released on DVD and Blu-ray in the United Kingdom on April 13, 2009. On January 12, 2009, a video game based on the film was released for the Nintendo DS.

== Plot ==
Mo and Resa Folchart read the fairy tale "Little Red Riding Hood" to their baby daughter Meggie, as a red velvet hood appears out of thin air. Twelve years later, Meggie visits an old book shop in Europe with her father, unaware that he is secretly looking for a copy of the book Inkheart. Shortly after Mo finds the book, she encounters a horned marten outside the shop and it tries to bite her fingers.

A man appears from the shadows, claiming to be an old friend. Mo comes out of the shop, recognizing the man as Dustfinger, who quickly asks him to "read him back into the book". Father and daughter flee to visit her great-aunt Elinor in Italy.

There, Mo tells Meggie that nine years ago, while reading to her from Inkheart, he inadvertently brought Dustfinger out of the book and into the real world, through a gift he possessed from birth. Unfortunately, the book's villain Capricorn and his henchman Basta also came out of the book. Fleeing with his infant daughter, Mo realizes Resa had been taken into the book.

Capricorn arrives with Basta, who captures the group, destroys Elinor's library and takes Inkheart. Mo, Meggie, and Elinor are taken to Capricorn's new castle in the real world. During their imprisonment, Mo explains his gift to Meggie and Elinor, stating that when he reads a person or an object out of a book, someone from the real world is sent into it, hence his wife's disappearance.

Capricorn forces Mo to use his gift, acquiring treasure from one of the stories in The Arabian Nights, and imprisoning Farid, one of the 40 Thieves. Dustfinger, who was promised a return into the book, is betrayed by Capricorn. The group escapes using the tornado from The Wonderful Wizard of Oz.

Elinor leaves to recover what is left of her library as the others head for Alassio, the town of Inkheart author Fenoglio, who may have another copy. Dustfinger is initially afraid of learning his fate in the book, but eventually joins them. When they meet Fenoglio, the author's ecstatic reaction to seeing his creation alive leads Dustfinger to learn he dies at the end of the book while trying to save his marten, Gwin.

Dustfinger berates Fenoglio before eventually telling Mo that Resa is trapped in the real castle and has no voice. So, Mo and Dustfinger take Fenoglio's car and Farid stows away in the trunk. At Fenoglio's house, Meggie begins reading out loud, bringing Toto from The Wizard of Oz. Basta bursts in with his men and takes the group to Capricorn.

Elinor, having decided to stay, realizes something is amiss and pursues them. At the castle, Capricorn orders Meggie to bring a monster called the Shadow out of Inkheart and threatens to harm Resa if she does not comply. Mo sneaks into the castle. Dustfinger is captured, but escapes after Meggie informs him of Capricorn's intentions.

Mo attempts to free Meggie and the others, as Capricorn forces her to read the Shadow out of the book. Dustfinger returns to the castle with Farid and sets it on fire. The distraction allows Fenoglio to give Meggie a rewritten part of Inkheart, which should help Meggie stop Capricorn's plan.

As Elinor arrives with the creatures Capricorn imprisoned, Meggie writes out the story on her arm. As she reads it out, Capricorn turns into ashes as the Shadow devours him, his henchmen vanish, the Shadow explodes, and all the read-out creatures are returned where they belong. In addition, she grants Fenoglio's wish to live in the world he created, while reuniting herself and Mo with Resa, whose voice is restored. Dustfinger is also safely read back into Inkheart, where he is reunited with his wife Roxanne.

In the real world, Farid reveals he kept Gwin with him, thus allowing Dustfinger to avoid his own death. As Mo and his family leave with Farid, Meggie agrees to teach him how to read and Farid agrees to teach her how to use dragon breath, Dustfinger's fire breathing ability, which Farid learned.

== Cast ==
- Brendan Fraser as Mortimer Folchart
- Paul Bettany as Dustfinger
- Helen Mirren as Elinor
- Jim Broadbent as Fenoglio
- Andy Serkis as Capricorn
- Sienna Guillory as Resa
- Eliza Hope Bennett as Meggie
- Rafi Gavron as Farid
- Lesley Sharp as Mortola
- Jamie Foreman as Basta
- Matt King as Cockerell
- Steve Speirs as Flatnose
- Stephen Graham as Fulvio
- John Thomson as Darius
- Jennifer Connelly as Roxanne

== Production ==
=== Development ===
Shortly after the novel was published, author Cornelia Funke sent a copy of Inkheart along with a note to Brendan Fraser, explaining that he was her inspiration for the character of Mo.

So I get this book. It shows up in the mail. 'Dear Brendan,' it's inscribed, 'Thank you for inspiring this character.' I can feel my leg getting pulled already. 'What? Where's Ashton Kutcher?' 'I hope that you get a chance to read this aloud to your kids one day. Best wishes, Cornelia Funke.' I had no idea from a bar of soap who she was, so I Googled her. Wow, so much work, she's prolific. I think part of the story is that a little girl who was bilingual, I think she was a Brit but she spoke German fluently, had discovered a copy of Tintenherz which she loved and read, and wrote to either it was Cornelia or the publisher and asked why isn't this published in English? And I think Cornelia probably wanted to know the answer to that question too. So once it was, it just became a snowballing thing and then that really got her out there and led to the acclaim and popularity of her work.

It was this that motivated director Iain Softley and the casting department to consider Fraser first for the role in the film. Fraser told Softley that if it was determined that he was not right for the role, not to feel obligated to use him on the project. Softley was ultimately impressed with Fraser's performance and contracted him for the film. Public auditions were held for the role of Meggie Folchart with the intention of casting an unknown actress, however the role eventually went to Eliza Bennett who had already worked extensively on television and film at the time. Funke, was quoted as saying that "we had our second screening (summer 2007), which went well, and I really loved the movie, but they are still changing things, especially at the end." Inkheart was filmed at Shepperton Studios near London, England and on location in Balestrino, Albenga, Alassio, Entracque and Laigueglia, Italy, in 2006 and 2007.

[A] lot of the things that we tried to do are more to do with optical illusion, the sleight of hand. ... It feels very organic and very real, and I actually think it makes the magic more effective. I think that there is a sort of discounting that goes on in the minds of an audience when they know that it's sort of a computer world or a digital world. It's like, 'Oh, they can do anything. They can press a button for however many weeks they need at a machine.' Whereas if you actually get the sense that it's something more like the craft of illusion, I think that it's more magical, actually.

— Iain Softley, interviewed on the set

The production also visited Hever Castle in Kent to shoot the exterior for Elinor's Tuscan villa setting.

=== Visual effects ===
Double Negative created the menacing animated character, The Shadow, along with other creatures and visual effects for the film. The finale of the film takes place within a ruined amphitheater nestled in the Italian mountains; this is the lair of Capricorn, one of the villains Mo has accidentally "read" into the real world. The visual effects work included the digital augmentation of the bluescreen set, the billowing, pyroclastic monster, The Shadow, the surreal winged monkeys with their raven black feathers and Capricorn's final transition.

=== Soundtrack ===
- Munich Schmankerl - performed by the Bavarian Band and Chorus
- My Declaration - performed by Eliza Bennett

== Release ==
The American release was originally set for Christmas 2007, but the 2007–08 Writers Guild of America strike eventually moved the opening to December 12, 2008, in the UK and January 23, 2009, in the US.

== Reception ==
=== Critical response ===
On Rotten Tomatoes, the film has an approval rating of 38%, based on 146 reviews, with an average rating of 5.1/10. The site's consensus reads, "Heavy on clichés and light on charm, this kid-lit fantasy-adventure doesn't quite get off the ground." On Metacritic, the film has a score of 49 out of 100, based on reviews from 34 critics, indicating "mixed or average" reviews. Audiences surveyed by CinemaScore gave the film a grade B+ on scale of A to F.

Kirk Honeycutt of The Hollywood Reporter disliked the film, saying: "Whatever made the German novel Inkheart by Cornelia Funke so popular that it got translated into 37 languages is nowhere in evidence in its film version", and "The main problem is the central concept itself."

Bill Goodykoontz of The Arizona Republic enjoyed the film, saying: "Inkheart is entertaining enough, if not always easy to follow. And if it does nothing else, at least it may inspire kids to read, if for no other reason than to help make sense of it all." A. O. Scott said the film "aims for a blend of whimsy and tingly suspense but botches nearly every spell it tries to cast. Its opening scenes are more confusing than intriguing, and the acceleration of the plot leads to a sense of busyness rather than suspense. A movie that can produce the image of Helen Mirren astride a unicorn has some claim on the audience's interest, and a movie that can make that image seem perfectly uninteresting is in some serious trouble."

=== Box office ===
The film grossed $2,110,000 during its opening day in 2,655 theaters. It opened at #7 at the U.S. box office with $7,725,000, with a worldwide gross of close to $13 million. It yielded just $1 million from its opening in the UK, ranking fourth, while coming in third at $1.8 million in Germany. It later came to make $5,781,992 in the UK, $10,112,691 in Germany, $1,222,364 in Australia, $1,484,027 in France, $3,289,477 in Italy, $1,815,500 in Taiwan, $2,951,290 in Spain, $2,665,476 in South Korea, $1,681,477 in Russia, $2,378,200 in Mexico, and $1,080,825 in Malaysia, plus $4,187,389 from smaller countries. Inkheart made $17,303,424 in the United States, and $45,146,937 internationally, making the final worldwide gross of the film to be $62,450,361. It made $8.3 million in US DVD sales during its first week.

=== Accolades ===
Javier Navarrete won the award for Best Original Score for a Fantasy Science Fiction Film for this film at the IFMCA Award.

== Home media ==
Inkheart was released on DVD and Blu-ray in the United Kingdom on April 13, 2009. It was released in the United States on June 23, 2009. It was released in Australia on September 24, 2009, on DVD and Blu-Ray and re-released on August 10, 2016, on both DVD and Blu-Ray.

== In other media ==
=== Video games ===
On January 12, 2009, a video game based on the film was released for the Nintendo DS. On Metacritic the game has a score of 39/100 based on eight critic reviews, indicating "generally unfavorable" reviews.
