= Dragon Rider (film) =

2020 German animated fantasy film

- German theatrical film poster.
- German: Drachenreiter
- Directed by: Tomer Eshed
- Screenplay by: John R. Smith
- Based on: Dragon Rider by Cornelia Funke
- Produced by: Oliver Berben; Christoph Müller
- Starring: Thomas Brodie-Sangster; Felicity Jones; Freddie Highmore; Patrick Stewart
- Cinematography: Olaf Aue
- Edited by: Rikke Malena Nielsen
- Music by: Stefan Maria Schneider
- Production companies: Constantin Film; Rise FX; Cyborn; Able & Baker; Timeless Films
- Distributed by: Constantin Film; Netflix (International)
- Release dates: 1 October 2020 (Germany); 10 September 2021 (United States)
- Running time: 93 minutes
- Countries: Germany; Belgium; Spain; United Kingdom
- Languages: German; Spanish; English
- Box office: €6.4 million

Dragon Rider (German: Drachenreiter), also known as Firedrake the Silver Dragon by Netflix, is a 2020 animated fantasy film; while officially based on the 1997 novel of the same name by Cornelia Funke, the film takes influence from the How to Train Your Dragon series by Cressida Cowell, with its visuals and marketing based on that of the DreamWorks franchise. The film was due to be released in theatres on 6 August 2020, but due to the COVID-19 pandemic, the film release was postponed until 1 October 2020.

Netflix acquired global distribution rights to the film, and it was released on the streaming platform on 10 September 2021.

== Premise ==
Firedrake is a young silver dragon, who has had enough of constantly having to hide in a wooded valley. He wants to show the older generations of dragons that he is a real dragon. When humans are about to destroy his family's very last refuge, Firedrake secretly sets off on an adventurous journey with Sorrel a bad-tempered cat-like forest brownie. He wants to find the "Rim of Heaven", the dragons' mysterious haven. On their quest, Firedrake and Sorrel encounter Ben, an orphanned teenager who claims to be a dragon rider. While Ben and Firedrake make friends quickly, Sorrel becomes increasingly distrustful and tries her best to get rid of the orphan at every opportunity. But the unlikely trio have to learn to pull together, because they are being hunted by Nettlebrand, a monster created by an alchemist with the aim of tracking down and destroying every dragon on Earth.

== Voice cast ==
- Thomas Brodie-Sangster as Firedrake
- Felicity Jones as Sorrel
- Freddie Highmore as Ben Greenbloom
- Patrick Stewart as Nettlebrand
- Jimmy Hibbert as Twigleg
- Alex Norton as Gravelbeard
- Nonso Anozie as The Djinn
- Meera Syal as Subisha Gulab
- Sanjeev Bhaskar as Mad Doc

== Production ==
It was announced in June 2017 that production had begun on an animated adaptation of Cornelia Funke's novel. The film is a German-Belgian-Spanish-British co-production. The animation was handled by Spain's Able & Baker and Cyborn Studios, while additional parts of the lighting and compositing took place at Rise FX and Big Hug FX. The production work took place in Berlin, Munich and Antwerp.

In May 2018, the castings of Felicity Jones, Patrick Stewart, Freddie Highmore, Thomas Brodie-Sangster, Nonso Anozie, Meera Syal and Sanjeev Bhaskar were announced.

=== Release ===
The film was due to be released in theatres on 6 August 2020, but due to the COVID-19 pandemic, the film release was postponed until 1 October 2020.

== Reception ==
=== Box office ===
Dragon Rider has earned $6,385,553 at the global box office.

=== Critical response ===
On Rotten Tomatoes the film has an approval rating of 80% based on 15 reviews with an average rating of 5.5/10.

Robbie Collin of The Daily Telegraph awarded it a score of it 3 out of 5. Collin said the film borrows heavily from other recent films and wrote: "Dragon Rider is unlikely to spawn many imitators of its own—even if it did, how could anyone tell?—but as a half-term diversion, it ticks every box." Cath Clarke of The Guardian awarded it a score of 3 out of 5, and called it a "bland but entertaining family film".
