= Eliza Bennett =

English actress and singer (born 1992)

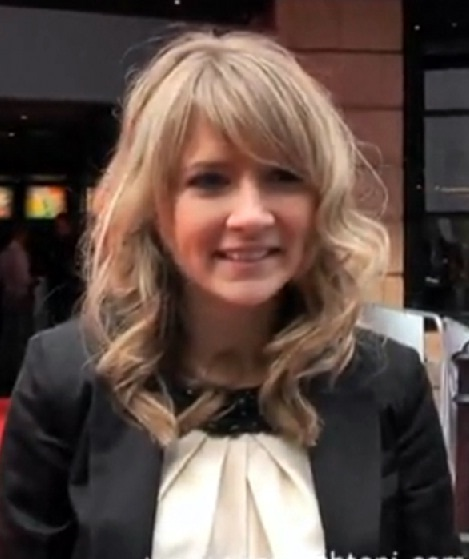
- Bennett in 2009
- Born: Eliza Bennett; 17 March 1992 (age 34); Reading, Berkshire, England
- Other name: Eliza
- Occupations: Actress, singer
- Years active: 2001–present
- Children: 1

Eliza Bennett (born 17 March 1992) is an English actress and singer. Her most notable roles have been those of Meggie Folchart in the film Inkheart, Tora in the film Nanny McPhee, Susan in From Time to Time and Holly Manson in the West End musical Loserville. Bennett starred on the black comedy series Sweet/Vicious as Jules Thomas. In 2021, Bennett played Amanda Carrington in the final two seasons (2021–2022) of the series Dynasty.

== Early and personal life ==
Bennett was born and grew up in Reading, Berkshire with her older brother and sister and attended Leighton Park School.

== Career ==
=== Film ===
Bennett landed her first role as Jemima in Chitty Chitty Bang Bang at the London Palladium in 2002 aged nine. She got her first film role playing Princess Arabella in 2004's The Prince & Me. In 2005 Bennett landed one of her biggest film roles, playing Tora in Nanny McPhee.

In 2005, she played Hayley in the TV movie Supernova, Young Anne in the 2006 film Victims, Emily in The Contractor with Wesley Snipes and television work as Nora in the Agatha Christie's Marple episode "By the Pricking of My Thumbs".

In 2006, Bennett played the role of Meggie Folchart in the film Inkheart, based on the novel by Cornelia Funke. In 2009, she went on to land the role of Susan in Julian Fellowes' film From Time to Time.

In 2010, Bennett played the role of Kate Anderson in Johannes Roberts' thriller film F, and appeared in Roadkill in 2011. In 2012, she portrayed the psychopathic character of Kayleigh in the thriller film Confine; a role for which she received a best supporting actress nomination at the Wild Rose Independent Film Festival, eventually receiving a distinctive achievement award. and also winning Best Actress Award for Confine at CYIFF 2013

Bennett played Alex/Brittany in the 2015 film H8RZ and Agathe Von Trapp in the 2015 film The von Trapp Family: A Life of Music.

From 2016 to 2017, Bennett starred as Jules Thomas in Sweet/Vicious. In 2021, she began playing Amanda Carrington in the CW series Dynasty.

=== Music ===
Bennett performed a song for Inkheart's soundtrack, called "My Declaration", originally written and performed by Tom Baxter.

In 2012, Bennett went back to musical theatre when she was cast as Holly in the West End musical Loserville. This was first performed at the West Yorkshire Playhouse in Leeds, before getting a West End transfer to the Garrick Theatre in 2012.

Bennett released her new EP "Late Twenties" in November 2022.

== Filmography ==
=== Film ===
Year	Title	Role	Notes	Refs.
2004	The Prince & Me	Princess Arabella		
2005	Nanny McPhee	Tora Brown		
2007	The Contractor	Emily Day		
2008	Inkheart	Meggie Folchart	Credited as Eliza Hope Bennett	
2009	From Time to Time	Susan Oldknow		
2009	Perfect Life	Young Anne		
2010	F	Kate Anderson		
2011	Roadkill	Hailey		
2012	Grimm's Snow White	Snow White		
2013	Confine	Kayleigh		
2015	H8RZ	Alex Thomas / Brittany Tammand		
2015	The von Trapp Family: A Life of Music	Agathe Von Trapp		
2022	Do Revenge	Jessica	Netflix film	
2024	An American in Austen	Harriet	Hallmark Film	

=== Television ===
Year	Film	Role	Notes	Refs.
2005	Supernova	Haley Richardson	Television film	
2006	Agatha Christie's Marple	Nora Johnson	Episode: "By the Pricking of My Thumbs"	
2013	The Midnight Beast	Amy	Episode: "Going Solo"	
2014	BBC Comedy Feeds	Sofie	Flat TV	
2014	Plebs	Ambrosia	Episode: The Candidate	
2015	Valentine's Kiss	Lily Whiteley	TV mini-series; 2 episodes	
2015	Broadchurch	Lisa Newbery	Series 2	
2015	Strike Back	Chloe Foster	Series 5	
2016	Grantchester	Kitty Lawson	Season 2	
2016–2017	Sweet/Vicious	Jules Thomas	Main role	
2019	This Is Us	Miss Cunningham	Episode: "The Graduates"	
2019	The Conners	Odessa	Recurring role; 5 episodes	
2021–2022	Dynasty	Amanda Carrington	Recurring role (season 4); Main role (season 5)	
2023	Sexy Beast	Marjorie	TV Series	
2025	Matlock	Amy Buckley	Episode: "I Was That, Too"	

== Discography ==
=== Extended plays ===
Title	Details
TBA	Released: TBA; Format: Digital download, streaming; Label: Independent

=== Singles ===
Title	Year	Album
"Stole Me"	2019	Non-album singles
"Do You Think About Me"	2020	Non-album singles
"Metal Heart"	2020	Non-album singles
"Sweetheart"	2020	Non-album singles
"Hate To Love You"	2022	Non-album singles
"Visit Me In Georgia"	2022	Non-album singles
"Late 20s	2022	Non-album singles
"Have Yourself A Merry Little Christmas" (featuring Elizabeth Gillies)	2022	Non-album singles

=== Other appearances ===
Title	Year	Other artist(s)	Album
"My Declaration"	2009	None	Inkheart

=== Music videos ===
Title	Year	Director
"Do You Think About Me"	2020	Nicola Collie & Todd Blubaugh
"Metal Heart "	2020	Georgia King
"Visit Me In Georgia"	2022	Elizabeth Gillies
Late 20s	2022	Bethany Showalter

== Theatre ==
Year	Title	Role	Notes	Refs.
April 2002	Chitty Chitty Bang Bang	Jemima Potts	London Palladium	
July 2012	Loserville	Holly Manson	West Yorkshire Playhouse	
2012–2013	Loserville	Holly Manson	Garrick Theatre	

== Awards and nominations ==
Year	Award	Category	Work	Result	Refs.
2007	Young Artist Award	Best Young Ensemble in a Feature Film (Shared with Thomas Sangster, Raphaël Coleman, Jennifer Rae Daykin, Holly Gibbs & Samuel Honywood)	Nanny McPhee	Nominated	
2012	Broadwayworld West End Awards	Best Leading Actress in a Musical	Loserville	Nominated	
2012	Wild Rose Independent Film Festival	Best Supporting Actress	Confine	Nominated	
2013	CYIFF	Best Actress	Confine	Won	
