= Dragon Rider (novel) =

1997 German children's novel by Cornelia Funke

- Scholastic's American cover for Dragon Rider
- Author: Cornelia Funke
- Original title: Drachenreiter
- Translator: Oliver Latsch (2000), Anthea Bell (2004)
- Cover artist: Don Seegmiller
- Language: German
- Genre: Children's, High Fantasy
- Publisher: Dressler
- Publication date: 1997
- Publication place: Germany
- English publication date: September 2000
- Media type: Print (Paperback)
- Pages: 523
- ISBN: 3-7915-0454-1
- OCLC: 38090719
- Followed by: Dragon Rider: The Griffin's Feather

Dragon Rider (original title: Drachenreiter) is a 1997 German children's novel by Cornelia Funke. Originally translated by Oliver Latsch, Dragon Rider was published in English in 2004 by The Chicken House in the United Kingdom and Scholastic Inc. in the US, using a translation by Anthea Bell. Dragon Rider follows the exploits of a silver dragon named Firedrake, a cat-like brownie named Sorrel, and Ben, an orphaned human boy, in their search for the mythical part of the Himalayas mountain range called the Rim of Heaven to find a safe place for Firedrake's kin to live when the dragon finds out that humans intend to flood the valley where he and his fellow dragons live. In the end all the dragons go except Slatebeard, an elderly dragon.

The novel became a massive success following its English-language release, and remained on The New York Times Best Seller list for 78 weeks, reaching number one on the Children's Best-Seller list.

A sequel, Dragon Rider: The Griffin's Feather, was published over a decade later, in 2017, and a feature film adaptation of the same name was released in 2020.

== Plot ==
Firedrake is a young dragon who lives in a hidden valley in Scotland with other dragons. After realizing that humans intend to flood the valley and the dragons living there are no longer safe, Firedrake sets off with guidance from the eldest member of his clan (Slatebeard) to avoid the "Golden One" and to find the Rim of Heaven, a legendary location that is a haven for all dragons.

Firedrake travels to the city with his friend Sorrel, a forest brownie with cat features, to find Gilbert Graytail, a rat who specializes in making maps. The duo meets Ben who provides Sorrel with human clothes so she may go in disguise to find Gilbert while Firedrake stays hidden. After finding Gilbert and providing payment, Gilbert hands over a map leading to the Himalayas, marking dangerous areas along the way. Only able to fly at night, Firedrake wastes no time wanting to leave. He and Sorrel also decide to bring Ben along with them. After Ben and Sorrel argue about turning East too soon or not, the three end up in a mountain range full of dwarves. Firedrake sleeps while the sun is up and the dwarves wait for him to wake up. While he rests however, one of the dwarves, Gravelbeard, runs to the castle in that same mountain range, revealing Nettlebrand, the Golden One, a fearsome dragon-like monster whose only purpose in life is to hunt, kill and eat dragons and his servant, Twigleg the Homunculus. After hearing of the trio, Nettlebrand decides to follow them, hoping to hunt down and kill the last of the dragons because he failed decades before.

Firedrake, Sorrel and Ben fly onward, but are soon swept off course by a storm, arriving on the shore of Egypt. Encountering a chicken-like monster known as basilisk and a band of zealous archaeologists, the party eventually befriends a kindly scientist named Professor Greenbloom. Sorrel is initially suspicious but soon warms up to him. Professor Greenbloom gives Ben one of two freezing-cold metallic scales he has, which unknown to the humans, once belonged to Nettlebrand. Twigleg relays the news to Nettlebrand, who immediately makes his way to the dig site to find Professor Greenbloom and recover the scales. Meanwhile, the three searchers set out on the advice of the professor to seek the advice of a Djinn, whose thousand eyes can see everything. Ben succeeds in fulfilling the Djinn's arcane requirements with the question: "Where does the Rim of Heaven lie?" The answer to the question appears in two of the Djinn's thousand eyes; it is a path, marked by the Indus River, by a mountain range, and by a monastery. Beyond this monastery is the Rim of Heaven. In the monastery, Ben must break the moonlight on the stone dragon's head. The Djinn also gives them a prophecy: "When that day comes, twenty fingers will point the way to the Rim of Heaven, and silver will be worth more than gold."

Meanwhile, Nettlebrand tracks down Greenbloom, who managed to escape him. Twigleg is discovered but is allowed to stay due to his almost-perfect ability to understand and translate any language. He has grown to be very attached to Ben, and he begins relaying false information to his master, sending him into the middle of a desert where he gets attacked by the sandmen, whom the monster eventually escapes. While flying over the ocean, a lunar eclipse occurs and Firedrake (who lives off of moonlight), cannot fly. He falls and lands on the back of an initially frightening but amiable sea serpent. She agrees to take the friends to Pakistan, where they will rendezvous with a Dracologist, Zubeida Ghalib. She alone knows a way to help Firedrake fly without moonlight. Along the way, the Serpent tells them (among other things) about Nettlebrand and his army of red-eyed Ravens. As the peaceful voyage atop Serpent-back continues, they are spotted by one of Nettlebrand's raven spies. Annoyed, Sorrel throws a stone which she has smeared her adhesive saliva. The stone sticks to the Raven's wing and sends him panicking to shore. In Pakistan, the friends enter a village where Zubeida the Dracologist is living and also find Professor Greenbloom. His wife and daughter, Guinevere, have joined him on account of the incident with Nettlebrand. Deeply worried, the two parties compare their findings, which all point to a single grim fact—Nettlebrand is hunting the Dragons who live in the Rim of Heaven, and expects Firedrake to find them for him.

Dr. Ghalib reveals a legend of a Dragon Rider who once lived in the village. Ben is his reincarnation, and his destiny is to save the silver dragons from a terrible enemy. No sooner have they heard the legend than two more of Nettlebrand's ravens descend on them. Sorrel attempts the saliva trick again, with one variation: a few sparks of dragon fire are added to the mix. The stones do not adhere, but the Ravens are indeed changed before the eyes of all, into a few crabs. This new strangeness on the part of Nettlebrand disturbs the searchers, ultimately inducing Twigleg to reveal his original intentions as Nettlebrand's spy. He also reveals Nettlebrand's origin—an alchemist created Nettlebrand as a dragon-killing machine to obtain the Dragons' horns which he used in his experiments to create gold. Twigleg, and his eleven other Homunculus brothers, were made as Nettlebrand's caretakers. When the Silver Dragons went into hiding, Nettlebrand killed the alchemist and eventually ate all of Twigleg's brothers, then went hunting on his own.

Zubeida showed Firedrake not only the tomb of the original Dragon Rider but also a species of flower that collects moonlight in the form of dewdrops on its leaves. Having drunk this "moon-dew", Firedrake can fly even if there's no moon at all. The two parties split up to lose Nettlebrand's pursuit in the mountains. After a hazardous encounter with a Roc, they are forced off course and must take refuge in a valley. Nettlebrand continues tailing a boat wherein Professor Greenbloom and his family, knowing they will lead him to Firedrake are seen by Guinevere.

In the valley, help comes to Firedrake and company in the form of Lola Graytail, Gilbert's niece. Lola had been charting the country for her uncle and she guides them to the monastery. There, they are welcomed by the monks, who look on Firedrake as a bringer of good fortune. Also, it is here that Ben "breaks the moonlight"--- a moonstone kept by the monks for this purpose. Ben shatters the moonstone and summons the aid of a four-armed brownie, named Burr-Burr-Chan. He agrees to guide Firedrake, Sorrel, Twigleg, and Ben to the Rim of Heaven. He warns, however, that Firedrake's kin has degenerated into earthbound cowards as a result of hiding from Nettlebrand. Whilst waiting for the moment of departure, the company discovers Gravelbeard (who was threatened by Nettlebrand into becoming another spy) but fails to catch him. They fly on their way swiftly, with Nettlebrand in pursuit. To Twigleg's dismay, in the center of the Rim of Heaven is a great lake, a perfect gateway for Nettlebrand, who can travel instantaneously by water. To make sure that he is right, Lola takes Twigleg in her miniature airplane to investigate and distract Nettlebrand, while above the others seeking the Dragons' cave. There, they meet with a she-dragon, Maia. She is the only living dragon there, as the other twenty-two have since turned into stone through lack of moonlight.

Outside, Lola and Twigleg found Gravelbeard. In the struggle that follows, the Dwarf's hat (which functions as an altitude compensator), is taken by Twigleg. Promptly Gravelbeard is struck with mountain sickness, allowing himself to be taken a prisoner. Nettlebrand, who now knows their location, is coming. No one knows how they could ever stop him since he is twenty times as strong as one dragon and immune to other dragons' firepower. In disgust, Sorrel spits on the golden scale the Professor gave Ben. Inspired by his success with the Ravens, Firedrake breathes fire on it and reduces it to gold paint. Twigleg comes up with a plan. He pretends to be still loyal to Nettelbrand and frees Gravelbeard then sends him back to Nettlebrand. The Golden One, elated by upcoming success, orders the Dwarf to polish his armor. Unfortunately for Nettlebrand, the armor polish has been replaced with Brownie spits. When Nettlebrand enters the cave, he is at once dive-bombed by Firedrake, Maia, and Lola in her plane. At last, the Dragons came together and set Nettlebrand afire. The Brownie spits reacted at once, dissolving Nettlebrand's armor and destroying him. Nettlebrand melts to reveal nothing but a toad underneath. As the company stares in wonder at this transformation, Gravelbeard enters. He has seen the marvelous gemstones and rock formations in the cave and wishes to enhance them with his skill, revealing that doing so will bring the petrified dragons back to life. Within a few days, all the silver dragons are awakened again. Firedrake and Maia went flying with Sorrel and Burr-Burr-Chan to bring the other members of their species back home. Ben and Twigleg went to live with Professor Greenbloom and his family. Two months later, news reached the humans that Firedrake had convinced the silver dragons to come with him to the Rim of Heaven. Eager to see their friends again, Ben and Guinevere occupy their time with other investigations of "imaginary" creatures until they can revisit the silver dragons.

== Reception ==
After being released to critical acclaim in Germany in 1997, the novel was translated into English and released in the United States in 2004, where it became a massive success. Dragon Rider remained on The New York Times Best Seller list for 78 weeks, reaching number one on the Children's Best-Seller list.

== Sequels ==
In late 2015, Cornelia Funke divulged details on a sequel to Dragon Rider, titled A Griffin's Feather. The sequel would be set two years following the first book, with Ben living with the Greenblooms at a creature refuge founded in Norway. The book was published in Germany under the title Drachenreiter: Die Feder eines Greifs on 23 September 2016, with the hopes of releasing it in English the following year in 2017. Dragon Rider: The Griffin's Feather was published on 5 July 2017. Funke also announced plans for a third book, tentatively titled The Volcano Adventure, which would be told like a graphic novel, along with mobile phone interaction.

== Film adaptation ==
A feature film adaptation of the same name was released in 2020.
