= Cornelia Funke =

German author of children's fiction (born 1958)

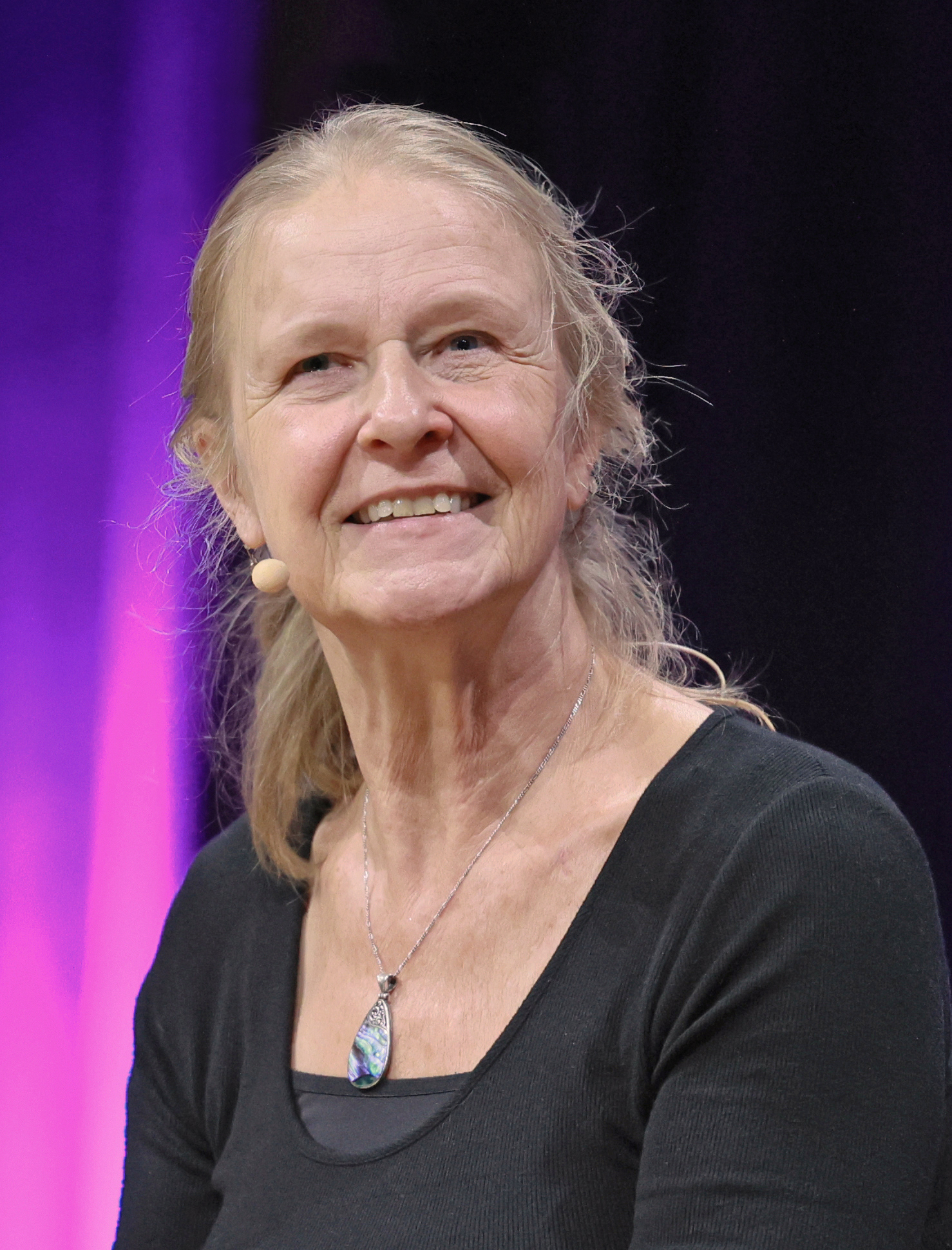
- Funke in 2023
- Born: 10 December 1958 (age 67); Dorsten, West Germany
- Occupation: Author
- Spouse: Rolf Frahm (m. 1979; died 2006)
- Children: 2
- Writing career
- Genres: Adventure, fantasy
- Notable works: The Thief Lord, Dragon Rider, Inkheart series
- Website: corneliafunke.com

Cornelia Maria Funke (German: [kɔʁˈneːli̯a ˈfʊŋkə]; born 10 December 1958) is a German author of children's fiction. Born in Dorsten, North Rhine-Westphalia, she began her career as a social worker before becoming a book illustrator. She began writing novels in the late 1980s and focused primarily on fantasy-oriented stories that depict the lives of children faced with adversity. Funke has since become Germany's "bestselling author for children". Her work has been translated into several languages and, as of 2012, Funke has sold over 20 million copies of her books worldwide.

Funke achieved acclaim as the author of the children's novels The Thief Lord (2002) and Dragon Rider (2004), which were translated and released in English after originally being published in Germany. She subsequently achieved wider recognition with the Inkheart series of novels, which include Inkheart (2003), Inkspell (2005), and Inkdeath (2007). The Thief Lord, Dragon Rider, and Inkheart have all been adapted into feature films and spent numerous weeks on The New York Times Best Seller list.

Often referred to as the "German J. K. Rowling", Funke was chosen by Time as one of the 100 most influential people in the world in their 2005 list.

== Early life ==
Cornelia Funke was born in 1958 in the town of Dorsten in North Rhine-Westphalia, Germany, to Karl-Heinz and Helmi Funke. As a child, she wanted to become an astronaut or a pilot, but ultimately decided to study pedagogy at the University of Hamburg. After finishing her studies, Funke worked for three years as a social worker. During her social work she focused on working with children who came from deprived backgrounds. She had a stint illustrating books, but soon began writing her own stories, inspired by the sorts of stories that had appealed to the deprived children she had worked with. She wrote her first story at the age of 28.

== Career ==
During the late 1980s and the 1990s, Funke established herself as a writer of children's fiction in Germany. Her early work includes two children's series—the fantasy-oriented Gespensterjäger (Ghosthunters) and the Wilde Hühner (C.H.I.X.) line of books. Only in 2002 did her novels begin being translated into English. Barry Cunningham, a publisher who was well known for signing J. K. Rowling and publishing Harry Potter and the Philosopher's Stone in 1997, received a letter from a young bilingual girl who asked why Funke's novel hadn't been translated into English yet. Cunningham sought out Funke and decided to release her novels in English through his newly-formed publishing house, The Chicken House.

Funke's first book to be translated into English was The Thief Lord, originally published in 2000 as Herr der Diebe. The translation, released by The Chicken House in 2002, won widespread acclaim and reached several bestseller lists. It was later adapted into a feature film of the same name in 2006.

Another early English translation was Dragon Rider, originally published in Germany in 1997 as Drachenreiter. Released in the United States in 2004, it became a massive success, and remained on The New York Times Best Seller list for 78 weeks, reaching number one on the Children's Best Seller list. A sequel, Dragon Rider: The Griffin's Feather, was published over a decade later, in 2017, and a feature film adaptation of the same name was released in 2020.

Funke found further acclaim with Inkheart (2003), which won the 2004 BookSense Book of the Year Award for Children's Literature. Inkheart was the first part of a trilogy and was continued with Inkspell (2005), which won Funke her second BookSense Book of the Year Award for Children's Literature in 2006. The trilogy was initially concluded in Inkdeath, but was revived in 2020 when Funke announced that a sequel called Die Farbe der Rache (The Color of Revenge) will be published by October 2021 in Germany.

Following the release of the first Inkheart novel, New Line Cinema bought the film rights to all three books for a cinema adaptation. Funke moved to Los Angeles in 2005 after she had accepted the offer to participate as the film's producer alongside Barry Mendel. Principal photography on the Inkheart film began in 2006. Directed by Iain Softley, the film is based on a screenplay by David Lindsay-Abaire and features an ensemble cast that includes Brendan Fraser, Helen Mirren, Paul Bettany, Jim Broadbent, Rafi Gavron, Andy Serkis, and newcomer Eliza Bennett, among others. Upon release, the film received mixed reviews. In 2009, a video game based on the film was released for the Nintendo DS.

In 2010, Cornelia returned with her first book since Inkdeath in 2007, Reckless. The combined printing run for the first hardcover edition was 1,000,000 copies. Two sequels, Fearless and The Golden Yarn, were released in 2013 and 2016.

In 2015, the film Ghosthunters on Icy Trails (German original title: Gespensterjäger), based on her novel Ghosthunters and the Incredibly Revolting Ghost!, was released in Germany on 2 April 2015.

In 2017, Funke published The Book No One Ever Read, the first work written by the author in English, as opposed to being written in German first. Funke calls the picture book her "Inkheart for kindergartners" and also illustrated the book herself.

== On writing ==
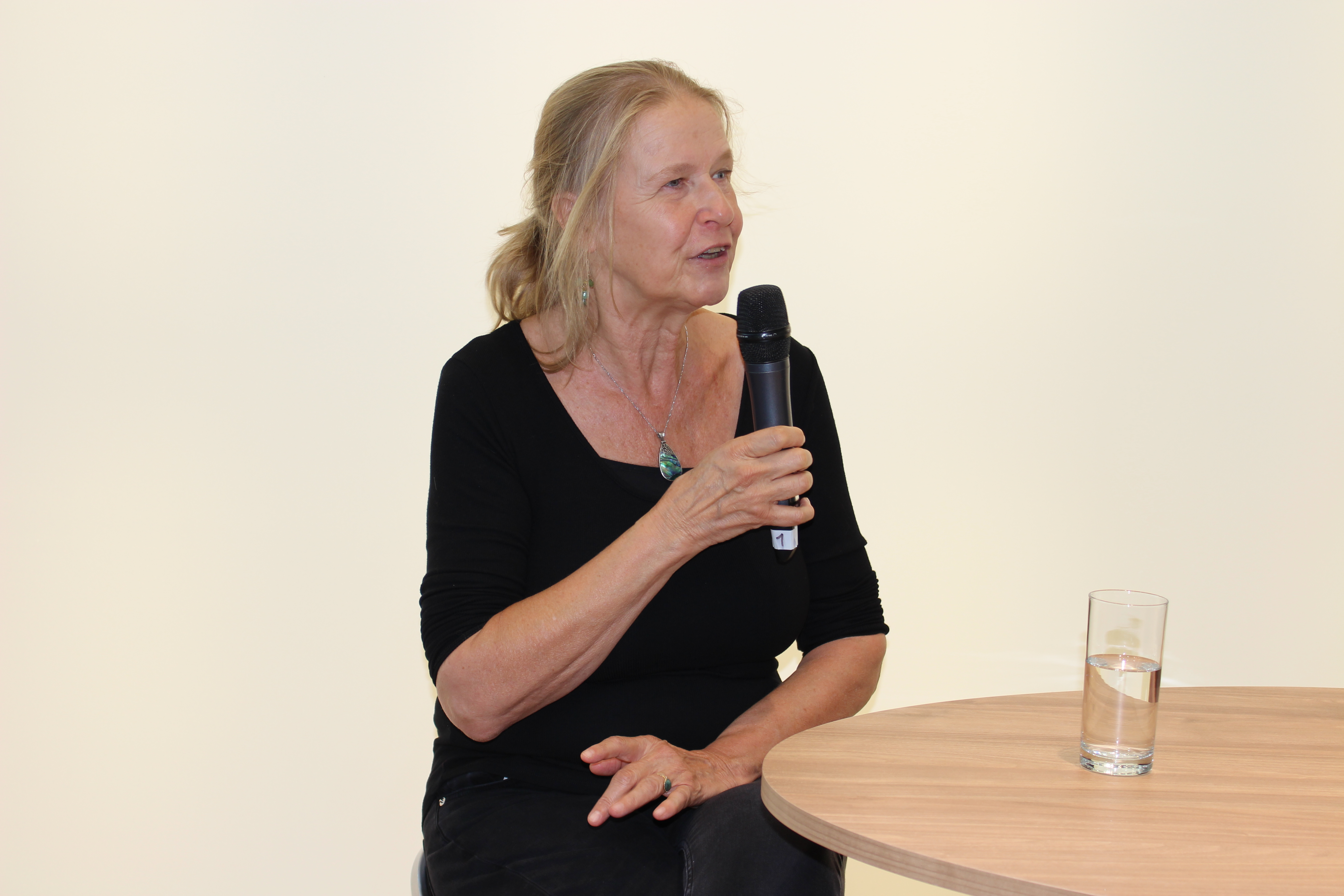
Funke speaking at the 2023 Frankfurt Book Fair

On her personal website, Funke states that the vital starting point for a good book is an "idea". She said of ideas that "they come from everywhere and nowhere, from outside and inside. I have so many, I won't be able to write them down in one lifetime." The characters, Funke elaborates, "Mostly they step into my writing room and are so much alive, that I ask myself, where did they come from. Of course, some of them are the result of hard thinking, adding characteristics, manners, etc., but others are alive from the first moment they appear", and pointed out that Dustfinger from Inkheart was one of the most vivid characters who ever popped into her mind. For aspiring authors, Funke says: "Read – and be curious. And if somebody says to you: 'Things are this way. You can't change it' – don't believe a word."

Her early time as a social worker has inspired the way in which she deals with the themes in her literature. In The Thief Lord, she shows children being in a difficult situation, but also still being children. Scipio says once that he is a good thief because he is small. She is willing to celebrate children for their own strengths, not just their ability to act like adults. In her picture book, The Book No One Ever Read, Funke starts: "Every book longs to tell its story."

== Personal life ==
Funke married printer Rolf Frahm in 1979. Their daughter, Anna, was born in 1989 and soon after their son, Ben, was born in 1994. The family lived in Hamburg for 24 years, until they moved to Los Angeles in May 2005. In March 2006, her husband died of cancer. In 2021, Funke then left the United States and moved to Tuscany, Italy.

Funke has been the official patron of the children's hospice Bethel for dying children since February 2010. Since 2012, she has been one of the German ambassadors of the UN Decade on Biodiversity. Since 2013, she has also been the Official Patron of the charity Ecologia Youth Trust, which helps marginalised children and young people around the world.

== Awards ==
- 1998 – Kalbacher Klapperschlange for Drachenreiter (Dragon Rider)
- 2000 – Wildweibchenpreis for her collected works
- 2000 – La vache qui lit for Herr der Diebe (The Thief Lord)
- 2001 – Kalbacher Klapperschlange for Herr der Diebe
- 2001 – Preis der Jury der jungen Leser for Herr der Diebe
- 2002 – Evangelischer Buchpreis for Herr der Diebe
- 2003 – Corine Literature Prize for Herr der Diebe
- 2003 – Mildred L. Batchelder Award for Herr der Diebe
- 2003 – Nordstemmer Zuckerrübe for Kleiner Werwolf
- 2004 – Preis der Jury der jungen Leser for Tintenherz (Inkheart)
- 2004 – Phantastik-Preis der Stadt Wetzlar for Tintenherz
- 2004 – Kalbacher Klapperschlange for Tintenherz
- 2004 – Book Sense Children's Literature Award (Children's Literature Honor Books) for Inkheart
- 2006 – Book Sense Book of the Year Children's Literature Winner for Inkspell
- 2008 – Roswitha Prize for her body of work
- 2020 – Special Award For Lifetime Achievement from the German Youth Literature Awards
- 2022 – Royal Society of Literature International Writer

== Novels ==
- Funke, Cornelia; Latsch, Oliver (2002). The Thief Lord. New York: Perfection Learning Corporation. ISBN 978-1-60686-784-6. OCLC 1322454728.
- ——; Latsch, Oliver; Howard, Paul (2006). When Santa Fell to Earth. New York: Scholastic. ISBN 0-439-78204-X. OCLC 69104220.
- ——; Bell, Anthea (2007). Igraine the Brave. New York: Chicken House/Scholastic. ISBN 978-0-439-90379-0. OCLC 74964166.
- —— (2010). Saving Mississippi. Frome: Chicken House. ISBN 978-1-906427-51-1. OCLC 619654061.
- ——; Latsch, Oliver; Offermann, Andrea (2013). Ghost Knight. New York: Little, Brown and Company. ISBN 978-0-316-05616-8. OCLC 846715416.
- ——; Funke, Cornelia; Williams, Allen (2019). Pan's labyrinth : the labyrinth of the faun (Young adult novelization of: Toro del Guillermo). New York, NY: HarperCollins. ISBN 978-0-06-241446-5. OCLC 1049577515.

=== Dragon Rider series ===
- Dragon Rider (1997, 2004 English release)
- Dragon Rider: The Griffin's Feather (2017)
- Dragon Rider: The Aurelia Curse (2021)

=== MirrorWorld series ===
- Reckless (2010)
- Fearless (2013)
- The Golden Yarn (2016)
- The Silver Tracks (2021)

=== Inkheart series ===
- Inkheart (2003, 2005 English release)
- Inkspell (2005, 2005 English release)
- Inkdeath (2008, 2008 English release)
- The Colour of Revenge (2024)

=== Ghosthunters ===
- Ghosthunters and the Incredibly Revolting Ghost (First Edition 1993, English version 2007)
- Ghosthunters and the Gruesome Invincible Lightning Ghost (First Edition 1994, English version 2007)
- Ghosthunters and the Totally Moldy Baroness! (First Edition 1995, English version 2007)
- Ghosthunters and the Muddy Monster of Doom! (First Edition 2001, English version 2007)

=== C.H.I.X. ===
- Die Wilden Hühner (1993) – The Summer Gang (C.H.I.X. – Book 1)
- Die Wilden Hühner auf Klassenfahrt (1995) – The New Girl (C.H.I.X. – Book 2)
- Die Wilden Hühner – Fuchsalarm (1998)
- Die Wilden Hühner und das Glück der Erde (2000)
- Die Wilden Hühner und die Liebe (2003)
- Die Wilden Hühner – gestohlene Geheimnisse CD-ROM (2004)
- Die Wilden Hühner und das Leben (2007, written by Thomas Schmidt but including the characters from former Die Wilden Hühner books)

== Picture books ==
- The Princess Knight (2003)
- Pirate Girl (2005)
- The Wildest Brother (2006)
- Princess Pigsty (2007)
- The Pirate Pig (2015)
- Emma and the Blue Genie (2015)
- The Book No One Ever Read (2017)
