= List of children's book series =

A children's book series is a set of fiction books, written specifically for child readers. Most have a connected storyline, with intertwining elements for the reader to follow along in the progressing plot. However, some children's book series are self-contained in each installment but they still establish an integral set of characters to carry the narrative.

Series	Author	Publication range	# of books in series
The Secrets of Droon	Tony Abbott	1999–2010	44
Danny Dunn	Raymond Abrashkin and Jay Williams	1956–1977	15
Happy Families	Allan Ahlberg	1980–	20
The Chronicles of Prydain	Lloyd Alexander	1964–1968	5
Vesper Holly	Lloyd Alexander	1986–2005	6
Westmark	Lloyd Alexander	1981–1984	3
Aldo Zelnick	Karla Oceanak	2009–2018	A to Z; up to M so far
Animorphs	K. A. Applegate	1996–2001	54 + 10 spinoffs
The Lighthouse Keeper series	Ronda Armitage	1977–2020	12
The Three Investigators	Robert Arthur, Jr. and others	1964–1987	43 + 17 spinoffs
Motor Boat Boys	Louis Arundel	1912–1915	7
Crispin	Avi	2003–2010	3
The Railway Series	Wilbert Awdry	1945–1972	26
The Railway Series	Christopher Awdry	1983–2011	16
Fluffy Little Kitten	Robert Bassett	2007–2008	4
Keeper of the Lost Cities	Shannon Messenger	2012-2024	11
Johnny Dixon	John Bellairs, Brad Strickland	1983–2022	13
Lewis Barnavelt	John Bellairs, Brad Strickland	1973–2008	12
The Berenstain Bears	Stan and Jan Berenstain	1962–present	400+
Arthur	Luc Besson	2002–2005	4
Sam Hawkins, Pirate Detective	Ian Billings	2003–2004	2
Gumdrop	Val Biro	1966–2001	37
The Travels of Wiglington and Wenks	John Bittleston and Eliza Quek	1987	4
Beverly Gray	Clair Blank	1934–1955	26
The Famous Five	Enid Blyton	1942–1963	21
The Secret Seven	Enid Blyton	1949–1963	17 + 7 short spinoffs
Paddington Bear	Michael Bond	1958–2018	30 + 5 special publications
Kofiko and Chipopo	Tamar Bornstein-Lazar	1957–present	
Dave Dawson series	R. Sidney Bowen	1941–1946	
Red Randall series	R. Sidney Bowen	1944–1946	8
The Last Kids on Earth	Max Brallier	2015–present	10 + 5 spinoffs
Chalet School	Elinor M. Brent-Dyer	1925–1970	58
Clifford the Big Red Dog	Norman Bridwell	1963–2015	80
Milly-Molly-Mandy	Joyce Lankester Brisley	1928–1967	6
Arthur	Marc Brown	1976–2011	46
Lola Levine	Monica Brown	2015–2017	6
Sarai	Monica Brown	2018–present	4
Babar the Elephant series	Jean de Brunhoff and Laurent de Brunhoff	1931–present	44
School Friends	Ann Bryant	2008–2009	12
Jennings	Anthony Buckeridge	1950–1994	24
Catfish Bend	Ben Lucien Burman	1952–1984	7
Molly Moon	Georgia Byng	2002–2012	9
Alice	Lewis Carroll	1865–1871	2
Three Thieves	Scott Chantler	2008–2016	7
Henry Huggins	Beverly Cleary	1950–1963	6
Ramona	Beverly Cleary	1955–1999	8
The Magic School Bus	Joanna Cole	1986–2010	13 + 85 spinoffs and extras
The Land of Stories	Chris Colfer	2012–present	10
Little Mabel	Jilly Cooper	1980–1985	4
Little Bill	Bill Cosby	1997–1999	12
How to Train Your Dragon	Cressida Cowell	2003–2015	12
Just William	Richard Crompton	1922–1970	38
The Demon Headmaster	Gillian Cross	1982–2019	8
The Animals of Farthing Wood	Colin Dann	1979–1994	8
Dauntless series	James Kerr (as "Peter Dawlish")	1947–1960	8
Alex Archer series	Tessa Duder	1987–1993	
Tom Swift	Victor Appleton	1910–1941	
Tom Swift	William Dougherty, John Almquist, Richard Sklar, James Duncan Lawrence, Thomas Mulvey and Richard McKenna	1954–1971	
Tom Swift	Bill Rotsler, Sharmon Divono, Neal Barrett, Jr. and Robert E. Vardeman	1981–1984	
Tom Swift	Bill McCay, Steven Grant, F. Gwynplaine MacIntrye, Debra Doyle, James D. Macdonald, Robert E. Vardeman, Bruce Holland Rogers, Bridget McKenna	1991–1993	
Tom Swift Young Inventor	Victor Appleton	2006–2007	6
Firland	Norman Sandiford Power	1970–1974	3
Matthew Livingston	Marco Conelli	2007–	
The Indian in the Cupboard	Lynne Reid Banks	1980–1998	5
Outernet	Steve Barlow and Steve Skidmore	2002–2003	6
Peter and the Starcatchers	Dave Barry and Ridley Pearson	2004–2011	5
Oz series	L. Frank Baum, Ruth Plumly Thompson, and others	1900–1920 (Baum); 1921–1963 (others)	14
Madeline	Ludwig Bemelmans	1939–1956	6
Madeline	John Bemelmans Marciano	1999–2013	6
The Secret Series	Pseudonymous Bosch	2007-2011	5
The Dark Is Rising Sequence	Susan Cooper	1965–1977	5
The Bagthorpe Saga	Helen Cresswell	1977–2001	10
Lizzie Dripping	Helen Cresswell	1973–1994	5
Posy Bates	Helen Cresswell	1992–1994	3
Two Hoots series	Helen Cresswell	1974–1977	7
Winklesea series	Helen Cresswell	1971–1995	3
Geronimo Stilton	Elisabetta Dami	1997–present	85 + 40 spinoffs
Amber Brown	Paula Danziger	1994–2003	
Amber Brown	Bruce Coville and Elizabeth Levy	2012–present	
The Spiderwick Chronicles	Tony DiTerlizzi and Holly Black	2003–2009	8
The Hardy Boys	Franklin W. Dixon	1927–2005	58
The Clues Brothers	Franklin W. Dixon	1997–2000	17
The Hardy Boys: Undercover Brothers	Franklin W. Dixon	2005–2012	40
The Hardy Boys Adventures	Franklin W. Dixon	2013–2023	23
Jim Button (Jim Knopf) series	Michael Ende	1960–1962	2
The Familiars	Adam Jay Epstein and Andrew Jacobson	2010–2013	4
Hank the Cowdog	John R. Erickson	1983-current	84
The Black Stallion	Walter Farley and Steven Farley	1941–1989	21
Père Castor	Paul Faucher	1933–present	
The Great Brain	John D. Fitzgerald	1967–1995	8
The Boss Baby	Marla Frazee	2010-2016	2
Dragon Rider	Cornelia Funke	1997–2021	3
Ghosthunters	Cornelia Funke	1993–2001	4
Inkheart series	Cornelia Funke	2003–2024	4
MirrorWorld	Cornelia Funke	2010–present	5
Grandpa Chatterji	Jamila Gavin	1993–2006	3
Kamla and Kate duology	Jamila Gavin	1983–1991	2
Surya trilogy	Jamila Gavin	1992–1997	3
The Vanderbeekers	Karina Yan Glaser	2017–2023	7
Just!	Andy Griffiths	1997–2012	9
Raggedy Ann	Johnny Gruelle	1918–present	63
Mr. Men	Roger Hargreaves	1971–1988	6
Mr. Men	Adam Hargreaves	1988–present	
Little Miss	Roger Hargreaves	1981–1988	12
Little Miss	Adam Hargreaves	1988–present	
Timbuctoo	Roger Hargreaves	1978–1979	25
Beaver Towers	Nigel Hinton	1980–1997	4
Angelina Ballerina	Katharine Holabird	1983–2021	60
Mona the Vampire	Sonia Holleyman	1990–	7
Bobbsey Twins	Laura Lee Hope	1904–1979	72
The Book of Silence	William Horwood	1991–1993	3
The Duncton Chronicles	William Horwood	1980–1989	3
Tales of the Willows	William Horwood	1993–1999	4
Bunnicula	Deborah Howe and James Howe	1979–2006	7
Oxford Reading Tree	Roderick Hunt and others	1985–present	800+
Sugar Creek Gang	Paul Hutchens	1940–1970	36
Kipper the Dog	Mick Inkpen	1991–2016	47
Redwall	Brian Jacques	1986–2011	22 + 2 picture books
Biggles	W. E. Johns	1932–1999	98 + 4 extras
The Adventures of the Bailey School Kids	Marcia T. Jones and Debbie Dadey	1990–2006	51 + 33 spinoffs
Chrestomanci	Diana Wynne Jones	1977–2006	7
The Guardians of Childhood	William Joyce	2011–2018	5
Nancy Drew Mystery Stories	Carolyn Keene	1930–2003	175
Nancy Drew Diaries	Carolyn Keene	2013–present	27
Nancy Drew: Girl Detective	Carolyn Keene	2004–2012	51
The Nancy Drew Files	Carolyn Keene	1986–1997	124
Mog	Judith Kerr	1970–2019	20
Witch Mountain	Alexander Key	1968–1978	2
Horrible Harry	Suzy Kline	1988–2019	37
Diary of a Wimpy Kid	Jeff Kinney	2007–present	20
Cahills vs. Vespers	Gordon Korman, Jude Watson, Peter Lerangis, Roland Smith, Linda Sue Park and David Baldacci	2011–2013	7
Pelle No-Tail	Gösta Knutsson	1939–1972	12
Mandie	Lois Gladys Leppard	1983–2004	44
The Chronicles of Narnia	C. S. Lewis	1950–1956	7
The Squickerwonkers	Evangeline Lilly	2013–present	4
Pippi Longstocking	Astrid Lindgren	1945–1948	16
Sítio do Picapau Amarelo	Monteiro Lobato	1920–1940	23
Doctor Dolittle	Hugh Lofting	1920–1952	15
Superspecial	C. Alexander London	2016	1
Betsy-Tacy	Maud Hart Lovelace	1940–1955	10
The Deep Valley series	Maud Hart Lovelace	1949–1953	3
The Wolf in Underpants	Wilfrid Lupano (illustrators: Mayana Itoïz and Paul Cauuet)	2016-	8
Tales of the Kingdom Trilogy	David and Karen Mains	1983–1996	3
The Lost Planet	Angus MacVicar	1953–1964	8
Merry series	Clare Mallory	1947	3
The Baby-Sitters Club	Ann M. Martin	1986–1999	146
The Baby-Sitters Club: Mysteries	Ann M. Martin	1991–1998	40
The Baby-Sitters Club: Friends Forever	Ann M. Martin	1999–2000	14
Winnie-the-Pooh	A.A. Milne	1924–1928	2
Winnie-the-Pooh	David Benedictus	2009	2
Anne Shirley series	Lucy Maud Montgomery	1908–1921	8
Not Quite Human	Seth McEvoy	1985–1986	6
Preston Pig	Colin McNaughton	1994–2011	6
What-a-Mess	Frank Muir		23
The Worst Witch	Jill Murphy	1974–2018	8
Mrs. Coverlet trilogy	Mary Nash	1961–1965	3
Psammead trilogy	E. Nesbit	1902–1906	3
Doctor Proctor's Fart Powder	Jo Nesbø	2010–2018	5
Meg and Mog	Helen Nicoll (illustrator: Jan Pieńkowski)	1972–2018	21
The Borrowers	Mary Norton	1952–1982	5
Rats of NIMH	Robert C. O'Brien	1972	3
Rats of NIMH	Jane Leslie Conly	1986–1990	3
Fancy Nancy	Jane O'Connor	2005–2013	80
Riverdale Stories	Oliver Optic	1862	12
The Magic Tree House	Mary Pope Osborne	1992–present	68
Abbey Series	Elsie J. Oxenham	1920–1967	38
Vampirina Ballerina	Anne Marie Pace	2012–2015	4
Choose Your Own Adventure	Edward Packard and others	1979–1998 (original series)	184 (original series)
Junie B. Jones	Barbara Park	1992–2012	28 + 3 extras
Foxwood Tales	Cynthia Patterson (illustrator: Brian Paterson)	1985–1998	8
Captain Underpants	Dav Pilkey	1997–2015	12 + 17 spinoffs and extras
Dog Man	Dav Pilkey	2016-	14 + 11+ spinoffs and extras
Dumb Bunnies	Dav Pilkey	1994-1997	4
Ricky Ricotta's Mighty Robot	Dav Pilkey	2000-2016	10
Pollyanna	Eleanor H. Porter, Harriet Lummis Smith, Elizabeth Borton, Virginia May Moffitt and Colleen L. Reece	1913–1997	16
Peter Rabbit	Beatrix Potter	1902–2012	6
The Nome Trilogy	Terry Pratchett	1989–1990	3
The Robber Hotzenplotz	Otfried Preußler	1962–1973	3
Swallows and Amazons series	Arthur Ransome	1930–1988	12
The Adventures of Tintin	Georges Prosper Remi (as Hergé)	1929–1976	24
Curious George	H.A. Rey and Margaret Rey	1941–1966	7 +61 spinoffs and extras
Creepy Carrots!	Aaron Reynolds (illustrator: Peter Brown)	2012–present	3
Jacob Two-Two	Mordecai Richler, Cary Fagan	1975–2009	3
Percy Jackson & the Olympians	Rick Riordan	2005–2009	6
The Heroes of Olympus	Rick Riordan	2010–2014	5
The Kane Chronicles	Rick Riordan	2010–2012	3
Magnus Chase and the Gods of Asgard	Rick Riordan	2015–present	3
The Trials of Apollo	Rick Riordan	2016	5
The Clue Hunt	Rick Riordan, Gordon Korman, Peter Lerangis, Jude Watson, Patrick Carman, Linda Sue Park and Margaret Peterson Haddix	2008–2011	11
Freaky Friday	Mary Rodgers, Heather Hach	1972–2009	4
Attack of the Underwear Dragon	Scott Rothman (illustrator: Pete Oswald)	2020-2021	2
Harry Potter	J.K. Rowling	1997–2007	7
The Winner's trilogy	Marie Rutkoski	2014–2016	3
Wayside School	Louis Sachar	1978–2020	4
The Little Ghost Godfrey	Inger and Lasse Sandberg	1965–2005	14
Busytown	Richard Scarry	1994–2000	
I'm a Happy Hugglewug	Niamh Sharkey	2005–2011	
The Rescuers	Margery Sharp	1959–1978	9
Dick and Jane	Zerna Sharp	1930–	
Five Little Peppers	Margaret Sidney	1881–1916	12
Horrid Henry	Francesca Simon	1994–present	24
Oddies	Grant Slater	2000s	
A Series of Unfortunate Events	Lemony Snicket	1999–2006	13
Encyclopedia Brown	Donald J. Sobol	1963–2012	29
Goosebumps	R. L. Stine	1992–1997	62
Tales to Give You Goosebumps	R. L. Stine	1994–1997	6
Give Yourself Goosebumps	R. L. Stine	1995–2000	50
Goosebumps Presents	R. L. Stine	1996–1998	19
Goosebumps Autobiographies	R. L. Stine	1997–1998	2
Goosebumps Triple Header	R. L. Stine	1997–1998	2
Goosebumps Series 2000	R. L. Stine	1998–2000	27
Goosebumps HorrorLand	R. L. Stine	2008–2012	25 + 2 extras
Goosebumps Most Wanted	R. L. Stine	2012–present	14
Judy Bolton Mystery Stories	Margaret Sutton	1932–2012	40
Cartoon Kid	Jeremy Strong	2011–2013	5
The Hundred-Mile-An-Hour Dog	Jeremy Strong	1996–2016	8
My Brother's Famous Bottom	Jeremy Strong	2007–2017	9
Pirate School	Jeremy Strong	2002–2007	5
The Happy Hollisters	Andrew E. Svenson	1953–1969	38
All-of-a-Kind Family	Sydney Taylor	1951-1978	5
Winnie the Witch	Valerie Thomas (illustrator: Korky Paul)	1987–2024	27
Anatole	Eve Titus	1956–1979	10
Basil of Baker Street	Eve Titus	1958–1982	8
Basil of Baker Street	Cathy Hapka	2018–2020	8
Mary Poppins	P. L. Travers	1934–1988	8
Bannerdale series	Geoffrey Trease	1949–1956	5
Blinky Bill	Dorothy Wall	1933–1934	3
The Boxcar Children	Gertrude Chandler Warner	1924–present	162
Impossible series	Marina Warner	1981–1982	4
Unstoppable	Jude Watson, Jeff Hirsch, Natalie Standiford and Gordon Korman	2013–2014	4
Doublecross	Jude Watson, C. Alexander London, Jenny Goebel and Sarwat Chadda	2015–present	4
Monty the Dog	Colin West	1989–1996	6
Galaxy of Fear	John Whitman	1997–1998	12
Little House on the Prairie	Laura Ingalls Wilder	1932–1971	9 + 1 nonfiction extra
Dr. Dee Dee Dynamo	Oneeka Williams	2013–2018	5
Hank Zipzer	Henry Winkler and Lin Oliver	2003–2010	18
Mercer Boys	Albert Capwell Wyckoff	1929–1933	10
Mystery Hunters	Albert Capwell Wyckoff	1934–1936	4
The 5th Wave	Rick Yancey	2013–2016	3
Secret Coders	Gene Luen Yang	2015–2018	6

== See also ==
- Children's literature
- List of children's classic books
- List of children's literature authors
