= The Blue Eye =

2001 children's book by Roderick Hunt

- Author: Roderick Hunt
- Illustrator: Alex Brychta
- Language: English
- Series: Oxford Reading Tree
- Genre: Adventure; Children's
- Publisher: Oxford University Press
- Publication date: 2001
- Publication place: United Kingdom
- Pages: 32
- ISBN: 978-0-198-45287-4

The Blue Eye is a 2001 children's adventure book by author Roderick Hunt and illustrator Alex Brychta that is part of the Oxford Reading Tree series. The book depicts the travels of two children, Biff and Wilf, in an unnamed Middle Eastern country as they help the princess Aisha regain a valuable stone called the Blue Eye.

In March 2022, The Blue Eye was withdrawn from sale by its publisher Oxford University Press following criticism and accusations of Islamophobia on social media.

== Plot ==
Whilst cleaning the house, Biff and her friend Wilf discover an old case of toys belonging to Biff's father, including a bag of marbles. Biff and Wilf examine the marbles more closely. When Biff touches a large blue marble, the magic key (an artifact that sends the children on magical adventures) begins to glow.

Biff and Wilf are transported to a foreign town that appears to be in the Middle East. They hide from a loud group of men who break into a nearby house. A woman jumps out of an upstairs window and runs from the men, dropping a package behind her. Biff and Wilf open the package, which contains a glowing blue stone called the Blue Eye.

In search of the woman, Biff and Wilf enter a large, bustling marketplace. They are confronted by the woman, whose name is Princess Aisha, in disguise. She tells them that the Blue Eye was stolen from her father and she needs the stone to become queen.

The group of men finds Princess Aisha, and she runs away together with Biff and Wilf. Biff throws marbles from her bag onto the ground, causing the men to fall down. The men catch up and corner the trio in a dead end, but Biff distracts them by throwing them the blue marble, which looks similar to the Blue Eye.

The trio flees on Princess Aisha's motorbike, with the men pursuing them in a jeep. Princess Aisha cuts the rope on the side of a lorry, causing hay to spill onto the jeep and block the men's way. Biff, Wilf, and Princess Aisha reach Aisha's aeroplane and climb aboard. The jeep tries to block their takeoff, but they escape.

During the flight, Princess Aisha shows Biff and Wilf her kingdom below them. When they land, they are greeted by a cheering crowd. Biff and Wilf are invited to a special feast, where Princess Aisha tells them that she can now become queen. The key begins to glow again, indicating that the adventure is over. Biff and Wilf are transported back to Biff's room. Biff suggests playing with the marbles outside, but she notices that there are only a few marbles left in the bag.

== Background ==
The Blue Eye is part of Oxford Reading Tree, a series of hundreds of children's books by author Roderick Hunt and illustrator Alex Brychta. The series has been translated into over 15 languages and used in over 130 countries to teach reading skills to millions of children. The "Biff, Chip and Kipper" titles in the series, which portray the adventures of the titular children, were used as the basis for the television programme The Magic Key.

== Publication history ==
The Blue Eye was originally published in 2001. In 2012, Oxford University Press revised a line of dialogue in the book's marketplace scene. Biff's remark "Let's stay together. The people don't seem very friendly," was changed to "Let's stay together. It would be easy to lose each other in such a crowded place."

== Reception ==
The book's marketplace scene

In 2022, screenshots of the book's marketplace scene, which included illustrations of men wearing turbans and a woman wearing a niqāb, circulated on Twitter. Critics took issue with Biff's statement that "the people don't seem very friendly" and Wilf calling the town "scary". Some described the scene as "inappropriate" or called it Islamophobic.

Others claimed that the critics were taking the scene out of context, saying that the language was used to describe the book's villains or that the children were scared of their unfamiliar surroundings. The Spectator noted that Biff and Wilf receive a warm welcome in Princess Aisha's kingdom from people also wearing Islamic clothing, arguing that the children "have simply stumbled on a town that isn’t particularly friendly."

In April 2022, Oxford University Press said that it had taken The Blue Eye out of print the previous month after an "independent review", destroying its remaining stock. OUP added that it would continually work to "remove any products that are no longer appropriate" and revise its list of titles to be "diverse, inclusive and reflective of the world we live in".

The Telegraph reported that Brychta was "profoundly upset" by the allegations of Islamophobia, stating that he was married to a Muslim woman of Iraqi origin and that he made regular trips to the Middle East to give book readings to children.
