= Missing sock =

Single sock in a pair of socks known or perceived to be missing

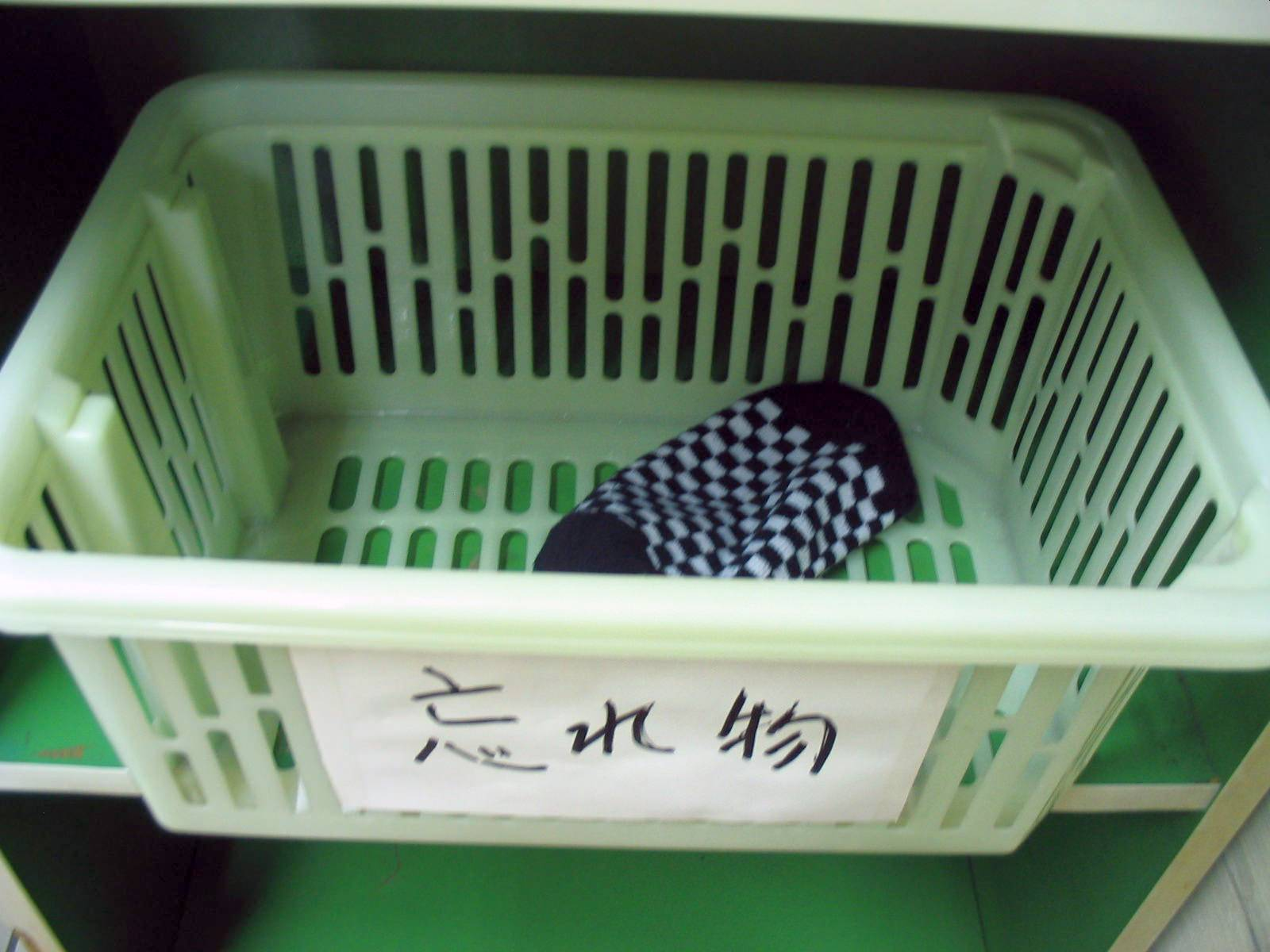
A single sock in the "lost items" basket of a laundromat

A missing sock, lost sock, or odd sock (primarily British English) is a single sock in a pair of socks known or perceived to be permanently or temporarily missing. Socks are usually perceived to be lost immediately before, during, or immediately after doing laundry.

According to popular media articles regarding missing socks, people almost always report losing one sock in a pair, and hardly ever the entire pair of two socks. Various explanations or theories—some scientific or pseudo-scientific and others humorous or facetious—have been proposed to show how or why single socks go missing or are perceived to have gone missing.

The terms odd sock and mismatched sock may instead refer to the remaining "orphaned" sock in a pair where the other matching sock is missing or lost.

== Plausible explanations ==
Two common plausible explanations for missing socks are that they are lost in transit to or from the laundry, or that they are trapped inside, between, or behind components of ("eaten by") washing machines or clothes dryers. Due to the high rotational speeds of modern front-loading washing machines and dryers, it may be possible for small clothes items such as socks to slip through any holes or tears in the rubber gasket between either machine's spinning drums and their outer metal or plastic cases. Socks may also bunch up or unravel and get caught in the water drain pipe of washing machines or in the lint trap of dryers.

In 2008, American science educator and writer George B. Johnson proposed several hypotheses for why socks go missing:

- during the drying cycle, socks are caught inside other clothing such as trousers or long-sleeved shirts due to static cling;
- socks are lost somewhere in the home or elsewhere while being transported to or from the laundry;
- socks are lost during washing, getting stuck inside components of the washing machine; or
- socks are lost during drying, getting stuck inside components of the dryer.

In his particular case, Johnson rejected all hypotheses except the last one, as it was possible for small items like socks to slip behind the dryer's spinning drum because of gaps between the drum and the dryer's outer metal case.

A 2016 pseudo-scientific consumer study commissioned by Samsung Electronics UK (to advertise their new washing machines where users could add more laundry to a load one piece at a time) referenced multiple human errors—including errors of human perception or psychology—to explain why socks go missing: they may become mismatched by poor folding and sorting of laundry, be intentionally misplaced or stolen, fall in hard-to-reach or hard-to-see spaces behind furniture or radiators, or blow off of clothes lines in high wind. Diffusion of responsibility, poor heuristics, and confirmation bias were the cited psychological reasons. For example: people may not search for lost socks because they assume others are searching; people search for lost socks in the likeliest places they could have been lost but not in the places where they are actually lost; or people may believe socks are or are not lost because they want to believe so despite evidence to the contrary, respectively.

The authors of the Samsung study developed an equation called the "sock loss formula" or "sock loss index" which claims to predict the frequency of sock loss for a given individual: $\text{Sock loss index} = (L + C) - (P \times A)$, where L equals laundry size (number of people in a household multiplied by the number of weekly laundry loads), C equals "washing complexity" (the number of types of laundry loads such as dark clothes versus white clothes done in a week multiplied by the total number of socks in those loads), P equals the positive or negative attitude of the individual toward doing laundry on a scale of 1 (most negative) to 5 (most positive), and A equals the "degree of attention" the individual has when doing laundry (the sum of whether the individual checks pockets, unrolls sleeves, turns clothes the right way if they have been turned inside out, and unrolls socks).

Complementary to the previous explanations, it was also suggested that other small clothes (of which people usually have many items and that get washed often) such as underpants, are lost as often as socks, but people do not notice that as often because they don't come in matching pairs. The existence of the non-paired remaining sock draws attention to the lost sock in a way that cannot happen with clothes that naturally come in singles and not pairs. Another suggestion made in this context is that since most people usually take off their socks, but not their underpants, when going to sleep, there is a higher chance for socks to get lost in the bedroom (e.g. pushed under the bed or taken by a pet as a toy).

== Prevention ==
Home appliance repair and design specialists from Sears and General Electric suggest not overloading laundry machines and repairing any holes in the gaskets between the spinning drums and the rest of the machines to avoid losing socks in them.

Other practical suggestions include:

- Keeping the sock pairs together: Before throwing the socks in the dirty clothes bin securely attach each pair of matching socks together with a safety pin or a rugged clothespin, or a plastic ring. There are also commercial products dedicated for this purpose.
- Separating the socks and other small items from other types of laundry, either by washing them is a separate load or by putting them in the machine in a mesh-bag: This will prevent the small items from getting lost inside larger things such as blanket covers.
- Giving up on preventing the loss of socks and buying many pairs of exactly the same socks. Thus, even if some socks will get lost over time it wouldn't matter so much (or won't even be noticed). Alternatively one can get used to wearing mismatched socks.

== Humorous explanations ==
Some explanations for the phenomenon jokingly suggest that socks have some innate propensity for going missing, and that this may be a physical property of the universe. For example, in the 1996 book The Nature of Space and Time by the physicists Stephen Hawking and Nobel laureate Roger Penrose, they posit that spontaneous black holes are responsible for lost socks.

In his 2008 examination of the phenomenon, George B. Johnson also rejected two humorous hypotheses for why socks go missing: that an "intrinsic property" of the socks themselves predisposes or causes them to go missing; and that the socks transform into something else, such as clothes hangers.

== In popular culture ==
The Bobs' 1988 song "Where Does the Wayward Footwear Go?", asks where lost socks disappear to, asking "To the bottom of the ocean? Or to China? Or to Cuba? Or Aruba?". A 1993 album by the American indie rock band Grifters is titled One Sock Missing. In the 2001 American children's film Halloweentown II: Kalabar's Revenge, lost objects including socks are magically transported to the home of a character named Gort, who is a compulsive hoarder.

American illustrator and voice actor Harry S. Robins wrote and illustrated a book titled The Meaning of Lost and Mismatched Socks. In the British children's book series Oddies, odd socks are transported to a planet called Oddieworld by a magical washing machine. In Terry Pratchett's novel Hogfather, a creature called the Eater of Socks is discovered to be responsible for missing socks.

The online sock subscription service and retailer Blacksocks was supposedly started after its founder wore mismatched socks to a Japanese tea ceremony.

== See also ==
- Abductive reasoning
- Effort heuristic
- Guesstimate
- Spherical cow
- Viral phenomenon
