= Zelnick =

Zelnick is a surname of Jewish origin, meaning either "haberdashery" or "tax collector". Notable people with the surname include:

- Mel Zelnick (1924–2008), American jazz drummer
- Robert Zelnick (1940–2019), American journalist and professor
- Strauss Zelnick (born 1957), American businessman

== See also ==
- Aldo Zelnick, a comic novel children's book series
- Zelnik (surname)
