= Zelnik (surname) =

Zelnik is a surname of Slovak and Slovene origin, originating as a topographic name meaning "cabbage". Notable people with the surname include:

- Frederic Zelnik (1885-1950), Austrian producer, director, and actor
- Jerzy Zelnik (born 1945), Polish actor

== See also ==
- Zelnik, a pastry eaten in Bulgaria and North Macedonia
- Zelnik István Southeast Asian Gold Museum, a private museum in Budapest, Hungary
- Zelnick
