= Alex Brychta =

British illustrator

Alex Brychta MBE
- Known for: Oxford Reading Tree
- Spouse: Dina
- Children: 2
- Awards: Member of the Order of the British Empire

Alex Brychta MBE (born January 1956) is a British illustrator. He has collaborated with Roderick Hunt MBE on a series of children books for the Oxford Reading Tree, The Magic Key, which had an animated spin-off. There were 30 books in the first Oxford Reading Tree pack, and there are now over 400 total. They are used by over 80% of British primary schools to help children learn to read, as well as in schools in more than 120 other countries.

Brychta followed in his parents' footsteps, and aged 10, his drawings were shown to the Lord Mayor of Hamburg in a public exhibition. In 1968, however, his family moved to England, where he had his first book published in 1972.

In addition to the Oxford Reading Tree, Brychta is also the illustrator of Read with Biff, Chip and Kipper (formerly Read at Home), the Wolf Hill series and the Time Chronicles series. He has also written and illustrated several children's books for J M Dent, Franklin Watts, and Oxford University Press.

Brychta was appointed a Member of the Order of the British Empire (MBE) in the 2012 New Year Honours for services to children's literature.

Brychta now lives in Surrey with his wife, Dina, with whom he has two children, Kelly Brychta and Dylan Brychta.

== See also ==
- Roderick Hunt
