= Oxford Reading Tree =

Children's book series

The Oxford Reading Tree is a series of books published by Oxford University Press since 1986, for teaching children to read using phonics. The series contains over 800 books.

The "Biff, Chip and Kipper" stories, written by Roderick Hunt and illustrated by Alex Brychta, were used as the basis for the CBBC television programme The Magic Key and, in later years, the CBeebies television series Biff & Chip. The Oxford Reading Tree contains other series of books including "Floppy's Phonics", "Songbirds Phonics" by Julia Donaldson, and "Oxford Reading Tree inFact".

In 2022, the book The Blue Eye was withdrawn from sale following allegations of Islamophobia on social media.
