= School Friends =

Series of children's novels written by British author Ann Bryant

- First Term at Silver Spires; Drama at Silver Spires; Rivalry at Silver Spires; Princess of Silver Spires; Secrets of Silver Spires; Star of Silver Spires; Party at Silver Spires; Dancer at Silver Spires; Dreams at Silver Spires; Magic at Silver Spires; Success at Silver Spires; Mystery at Silver Spires
- Author: Ann Bryant
- Country: United Kingdom
- Language: English
- Genre: Children's
- Publisher: Usborne Publishing
- Published: 2008–2010
- Media type: Print
- No. of books: 12

School Friends is a series of children's novels written by British author Ann Bryant. The books were published in 2008 and 2009. There are 12 books, each with one of the School Friends narrating it.

The series is based at Silver Spires, a modern-day boarding school. The first six books feature Katy, Georgie, Grace, Naomi, Jessica and Mia, who are all pupils in Year Seven at the school. Their boarding house is Hazeldean and their dormitory is Amethyst, which they solely share. The second six books feature Nicole, Izzy, Emily, Antonia, Sasha and Bryony. Their boarding house is Forest Ash and their dormitory is Emerald.

== Characters ==
=== Main characters ===
- Katy Katy's mother is a famous actress. At her old school, everyone wanted to be her friend because they knew, so Katy keeps it secret. At the end of Book 1, she reveals her secret to Naomi, her best friend. Later in the series she tells the rest of Amethyst dorm. She loves fashion and wants to be a designer.
- Georgie Georgie loves to perform by all means and will stop at nothing to get her main part. She's dramatic and funny and her best friend is Mia. She's often gossiping away and having fun and is known for always finding an easier way to do things, although in Book 2 she goes to desperate measures in order to win a part in the school play.
- Grace Grace is a budding athlete from Thailand. She is reliable and serious - her best friend is Jessica. In Book 3, she is in a swimming gala but another participant starts sending mean messages about her on the Silver Spires Chatroom.
- Naomi Naomi is a Ghanaian princess. At her old school, everyone wanted to be her friend because they knew. She meant to keep her identity secret at Silver Spires but in Book 1 Lydia leaks it out to the rest of the school. Her best friend is Katy, who has a similar secret - her mother is a famous actress. She is known as, 'The Wise One'.
- Jessica In most of the books Jessica is called Jess. She is a budding artist whose best friend is Grace. In Book 5, she gets nervous because although she is a good painter she has a secret which turns out to be that she has dyslexia, so she has to take special classes to help her with reading and writing.
- Mia Mia is a musician whose friend is Georgie. She is sweet, friendly and don't-careish. She always looks on the bright side of life and in Book 6 uncovers a cheater.

=== Secondary Characters ===
- Mrs Jennings is the matron for Hazeldean. She occasionally supervises prep and Georgie gets round her very easily.
- Miss Carol is the Hazeldean housemistress and often supervises prep. She is always there for the girls.
- Lydia appears greatly in Book 1 as a rival to Katie to win Naomi's friendship. Lydia stole Graces stopwatch and made the other girls think it was Katy, so she could have Naomi for herself. She is eventually found out, and uncovered as only wanting Naomi's friendship because she is a princess. She is unheard of for the rest of the series.
- Cara is a year eight girl, who gets the part Georgie wanted in the School play, but later becomes ill so they end up sharing the part.
- Felissa is a year seven that is jealous of Graces swimming and sports success. In book 3, she sends mean messages to Grace on the Silver Spires chat room, which upsets her.
- Poppy and Ali appear in book 4. Ali is Poppy's friend and Poppy is jealous of Naomi being a princess and a model. She appears in Book 4 much more than Ali does.
- Elsie is a year eleven textiles student who asked Naomi to model for her, but Elsie lies to Naomi which results in her pulling out of the fashion show. She is only heard of in book 4.
- Mrs. Cardwell is the learning support teacher Jess goes to in book 5 for her dyslexia.
- Bella is a participant in the Silver Spires Star Contest in Book 6. She goes on to win the show only to be uncovered as a cheat.

== The books ==
1. First Term at Silver Spires (Katy)
2. Drama at Silver Spires (Georgie)
3. Rivalry at Silver Spires (Grace)
4. Princess of Silver Spires (Naomi)
5. Secrets of Silver Spires (Jessica)
6. Star of Silver Spires (Mia)
7. Party at Silver Spires (Nicole)
8. Dancer at Silver Spires (Izzy)
9. Dreams at Silver Spires (Emily)
10. Magic at Silver Spires (Antonia)
11. Success at Silver Spires (Sasha)
12. Mystery at Silver Spires (Bryony)
