= George B. Johnson =

American journalist

- Born: June 11, 1942 (age 84); Newport News, Virginia, United States
- Education: Dartmouth College; Stanford University
- Occupations: Academic, science writer
- Employer: Washington University in St. Louis
- Writing career
- Period: 1965-present
- Subject: Explaining science

George B. Johnson (born 11 June 1942 in Newport News, Virginia) is a science educator who for many years has written a weekly column "On Science" in the St. Louis Post-Dispatch. For over 30 years he was a biology professor at Washington University in St. Louis and a genetics professor at Washington University School of Medicine. He has authored 44 scientific papers and ten high school and college biology texts. Over 3 million students have learned biology from these texts.

== Education ==
Johnson got his B.A. in English from Dartmouth College in 1964, and his M.A. in biology, also at Dartmouth College in 1966.

He was granted his Ph.D. in population biology from Stanford University in 1972, his thesis being on genetic variation in alpine butterflies.

== Academic career ==
Johnson was hired as an assistant professor of biology in the Arts and Sciences at Washington University in St. Louis in 1972. He was a visiting research fellow at Carnegie Institution of Washington, Department of Plant Biology, Stanford, California, 1975-1976. He was promoted to associate professor of biology at Washington University in St. Louis and also associate professor of genetics at their School of Medicine in 1976. He served as visiting lector, Genetisk Institute at Aarhus University, Aarhus, Denmark, in 1977.

In 1980 he was promoted to professor of biology at Washington University, a position he held until his retirement in 2004. He was also professor of genetics at the School of Medicine from 1981 to 2004. During the years 1987 to 1990 he served as founding director of The Living World education center, St. Louis Zoo.

Since 2004 he has continued at Washington University as professor emeritus of biology.

== Writings ==
=== Research publications ===
- Wild type and mutant stocks of Aspergillus nidulans, (with R.W. Barratt and W.N. Ogata), 1965, Genetics 52: 233-234
- Purification and characterization of glutamic acid dehydrogenase from Escherichia coli strain K-12. Master's thesis, Dartmouth College, 1966
- Analysis of enzyme variation in natural populations of the butterfly Colias eurytheme, 1971, Proc. Natl. Acad. Sci. USA 68: 997-1001
- The relationship of enzyme polymorphism to metabolic function, 1971, Nature 232: 347-348
- The selective significance of biochemical polymorphism in Colias butterflies, Doctoral dissertation, Stanford University, 1972
- Enzyme polymorphisms: Evidence that they are not selectively neutral, 1972, Nature New Biology 237: 170-171
- The relationship of enzyme polymorphism to species diversity, 1973, Nature 242: 193-194
- Enzyme polymorphism and biosystematics: The hypothesis of selective neutrality, 1973, Annual Review of Ecology and Systematics, 4: 93-116
- The importance of substrate variability to enzyme polymorphism, 1973, Nature New Biology 243: 1 51-153
- On the hypothesis that polymorphic enzyme alleles are selectively neutral. I. The evenness of allele frequency distribution, (with M.W. Feldman), 1973, Theor. Pop. Biol. 4: 209-221
- Enzyme polymorphism and metabolism, 1974, Science 184: 28-37
- On the estimation of effective number of alleles from electrophoretic data, 1974, Genetics 78: 771-776
- Studying genetic variation in human populations, 1974, Jour. Heredity 65: 260-261
- The use of internal standards in electrophoretic surveys of enzyme polymorphism, 1975, Biochemical Genetics 13: 833-847
- Enzyme polymorphism and adaptation, 1975, Stadler Genetics Symposium 7: 91-116
- Mechanisms of evolution and speciation, 1975, In Life: The Individual and the Species (T. Lane, Ed.). Mosby Publishing Company, St. Louis, Missouri.
- Polymorphism and predictability at the alpha-glycerophosphate dehydrogenase locus in Colias butterflies: Gradients in allele frequencies within a single population, 1976, Biochemical Genetics 14: 403-426
- Genetic polymorphism and enzyme function, 1976, In The Molecular Study of Biological Evolution, Chapter 3, pp. 46–59 (F. Ayala, Ed.), Sinauer Associates, Inc., Sunderland, Massachusetts.
- Hidden alleles at the alpha-glycerophosphate dehydrogenase locus in Colias butterflies, 1976, Genetics 83: 149-167
- Enzyme polymorphism and adaptation in Alpine butterflies, 1976, In Evolution Within Populations, Ann. Mo. Bot. Garden 63: 248-261
- Enzyme polymorphism in the butterfly Colias: Selection on metabolic phenotypes, 1976, Carnegie Institution of Washington Yearbook 75: 440- 449
- Characterization of electrophoretically hidden variation in the butterfly Colias, 1976, Carnegie Institution of Washington Yearbook 75: 449-456
- Factors altering the gel sieving behavior of proteins: The effect of deuterium oxide, 1976, Carnegie Institution of Washington Yearbook 75: 456-459
- Evaluation of the stepwise mutation model of electrophoretic mobility: Comparison of the gel sieving behavior of alleles at the esterase-5 locus of Drosophila pseudoobscura, 1977, Genetics 87: 139–157. Abstract: Genetics 83: s36 (1976)
- Characterization of electrophoretically cryptic variation in the alpine butterfly Colias meadii, 1977, Biochemical Genetics 15: 665-693
- Hidden heterogeneity among electrophoretic alleles, 1977, In Measuring Selection in Natural Populations (F. Christiansen, T. Fenchel, Eds.), Springer-Verlag, Berlin: 223-244
- Assessing electrophoretic similarity: The problem of hidden heterogeneity, 1977, Annual Review of Ecology and Systematics, Vol. 8: 309-328
- Isozymes, allozymes, and enzyme polymorphism: Structural constraints on polymorphic variation, 1978, Isozymes: Current Topics in Biological and Medical Research, Vol. 2: 1-21
- Enzyme polymorphism: Metabolic considerations, 1978, Metabolic Therapy, 7: l-4
- Structural flexibility of isozyme variants: Genetic variants in Drosophila disguised by cofactor and subunit binding, 1978, Proc. Natl. Acad. Sci. USA 75: 395–399. Abstract: Genetics 86: s33, (1977)
- Genetically controlled variation in conformation of enzymes, 1979, Prog. Nucleic Acid Res. Molec. Biol. 22: 293-326
- Genetic variation in the physiological phenotype, 1979, In Population Biology of Plants (O. Solbrig, S. Jain, G. Johnson & P. Raven, Eds.), Columbia Univ. Press, N.Y.: p. 62-83
- Genetic polymorphism at enzyme loci, 1979, In Physiological Genetics (J. Scandalios, Ed.), Academic Press, N.Y.: 239-273
- Post-translational modification as a potential explanation of high levels of enzyme polymorphism (with V. Finnerty), 1979, Genetics 91: 695-722
- Gene expression in Drosophila: Characterization of the enzymes produced by certain complementary maroon-like heterozygotes (with V. Finnerty, and M. McCarron), 1979, Molec. Gen. Genet., 172: 37-43
- The genetics of electrophoretic variation: a response (with V. Finnerty), 1979, Genetics 92: 357-360
- Increasing the resolution of polyacrylamide gel electrophoresis by varying the degree of gel cross-linking, 1979, Biochemical Genetics 7: 499-5l6
- Unvermutete Genetische Variation an Enzymorten (with V. Loeschcke), 1979, Biologisches Zentralblatt, 98: 163-173
- Structural vs. post-translational components of genic variation (with V. Finnerty), 1979, Genetics 92: 683-684
- Population Biology of Plants, 1980, Editor (with O. Solbrig, S. Jain & P. Raven), Columbia Univ. Press, N.Y.
- Polyploidy, plants, and electrophoresis (with B. Carr), 1980. In Polyploidy (W. Lewis, Ed.), Academic Press, N.Y.
- Post-translational modification of xanthine dehydrogenase in natural populations of Drosophila melanogaster (with D. Hartl and V. Finnerty). 1981. Genetics 98: 817-831
- Gel sieving electrophoresis: A description of procedures and analysis. In Methods of Biochemical Analysis (D. Glick, Ed.), 1983, Interscience Publishers, New York.
- Phylogenetic Implications of Ribosomal DNA Restriction Site Variation in the Plant Family Onagraceae (with J. Crisci, E. Zimmer, P. Hoch, C. Mudd and N. Pan), 1990, Ann. Mo. Bot. Gard 77: 523-538

=== Texts ===
- Biology (with P. Raven and latest edition with Ken Mason and Jonathan Losos and Susan Singer), 1986, 1989, 1992, 1996, 1999, 2002, 2005, 2008, 2011, 2014, 2017, 2020. McGraw-Hill Publishing Company, Dubuque, Iowa.
- Understanding Biology (with P. Raven), 1988, 1991, 1995. Wm. C. Brown Publishing Company, Dubuque, Iowa.
- Environment (with P. Raven and L. Berg) 1993. Saunders Publishing Company, Philadelphia, Pennsylvania.
- Biology Visualizing Life. 1993, 1997. Holt Rinehart Winston, Austin, Texas.
- Human Biology: Concepts and Issues, 1994. W.C. Brown Publishing Co., Dubuque, Iowa.
- Biology: Principles and Explorations, 1995, 2000 (with P. Raven). Holt Rinehart Winston, Austin, Texas.
- How Scientists Think: Key Experiments in Genetics, 1995. W.C. Brown Publishing Company, Dubuque, Iowa.
- The Living World, 1996, 2000, 2003, 2006, 2008, 2010, 2012, 2015, 2018 McGraw-Hill Publishing Company, Dubuque, Iowa.
- Essentials of the Living World, 2006, 2008, 2010, 2013, 2017, 2020 McGraw-Hill Publishing Company, Dubuque, Iowa.
- Understanding Biology (with Ken Mason) 2015, 2018. McGraw-Hill Publishing Company, Dubuque, Iowa.

== See also ==
- Biology
- Genetics
