= The Magic Key =

Series of reading books for children

- Genre: Adventure; Children's
- Based on: Characters from the Oxford Reading Tree
- Written by: Diane Redmond; Jan Page; Mellie Buse; James Mason; Jocelyn Stevenson; Lucy Daniel Raby; Julie Middleton; Joe Boyle
- Directed by: Tony Collingwood
- Voices of: Sophie Aldred; Maria Darling; David de Keyser; Kate Harbour; Adam Henderson; David Holt; Gary Martin; Richard Pearce; Emma Tate
- Composer: Roger Jackson
- Country of origin: United Kingdom
- No. of seasons: 1
- No. of episodes: 26

Production
- Producer: Christopher O'Hare
- Running time: 14 minutes 9 minutes (without educational segments; BBC One and CBeebies broadcast)
- Production companies: Collingwood O'Hare Entertainment Limited; HIT Entertainment

Original release
- Network: BBC Two
- Release: 25 September 2000 – 11 June 2001

The Magic Key is a British educational animated television series based on the "Biff, Chip and Kipper" stories from the Oxford Reading Tree published by Oxford University Press, originally written by Roderick Hunt and illustrated by Alex Brychta. The series is co-produced by Collingwood O'Hare Entertainment Limited and HIT Entertainment in association with the BBC and aired within the BBC Schools strand on BBC Two from 2000 until 2001.

== Plot ==
The series centres on the lives of three children, Biff, Chip and Kipper Robinson, their parents, their grandmother, their friends, Wilf and Wilma Page, Nadim Shah, Anneena Patel and the Robinsons' dog, Floppy. Floppy wears a collar around his neck with a golden key upon it. The key is magic, as the title suggests, and seems to do some strange things whenever one of the children asks a question and Floppy wishes for something. It starts to glow and transports the 7 children, Floppy and sometimes the Robinsons' grandmother through a vortex to other worlds, where they have exciting adventures, such as dealing with trolls in a cavern, being characters inside of a computer game, or finding the Fountain of Youth and when the adventure is done, they get a gift and the key glows and they all go home.

Alongside the main story, to fit in with the book's original educational values, there are helpful hints towards teaching children the best use of English.

== Characters ==
- Kipper Robinson, the youngest of the Robinson children who always carries his teddy bear around.
- Biff Robinson, the middle of the Robinson children.
- Chip Robinson, the eldest of the Robinson children.
- Mum/Mrs. Robinson, Kipper, Biff, and Chip's mother.
- Dad/Mr. Robinson, Kipper, Biff, and Chip's father.
- Floppy the Dog, the Robinsons' golden retriever.
- Gran, Mr. Robinson's mother and Kipper, Biff, and Chip's paternal grandmother.
- Wilf Page, Wilma's younger brother and one of the Robinsons' best friends.
- Wilma Page, Wilf's older sister and one of the Robinsons' best friends.
- Anneena Patel, one of the Robinsons' best friends.
- Nadim Shah, one of the Robinsons' best friends.
- Mrs. May, the children’s teacher.

== Original stories ==
The Oxford Reading Tree series was first published in 1985 with a set of 30 stories, and there are now over 300 stories altogether. It is used by more than 80% of schools in the United Kingdom, and has been translated into numerous languages in over 120 countries.

The books are aimed at children aged four to nine, and could form part of an English language syllabus in line with the National curriculum, designed to help children learn to speak and read Standard English.

The original book that the series is named after was first published in January 1986. It has many differences from what the TV series would have, with the titular item being kept inside a chest instead of on Floppy's collar. The latter would not always be on every adventure with the key, either and the adventures would take place in a magic doll house.

== Broadcast ==
It ran on the BBC Schools strand on BBC Two from 2000 to 2008 and it was also on the CBBC strand on BBC One strand from October 2000 to March 2001. It also aired on CBBC Channel's Class TV strand in 2003 and again in 2007. It also ran during the BBC Learning Zone late night strand between August and September and again in December 2006. A Welsh version titled Yr Allwedd Hud was broadcast on the S4C Ysgolion strand from 2001 to 2004.

== Episodes ==
No.	Title	Original release date
1	"HMS Sweet Tooth"	25 September 2000
Biff, unable to suppress her chocoholic tendencies, opens the cargo hold of HMS Sweet Tooth, alerting the pirates' chocolate radar to the ship's location.
2	"Lug and the Giant Storks"	2 October 2000
Kipper, Wilma and Floppy meet Lug, a lonely Space Elf, and some giant Space Storks.
3	"The Rook King"	9 October 2000
Kipper, Chip, Wilma and Floppy are turned into a scarecrow, an invisible boy, a cat and a frog by the wicked Rook King.
4	"Clutterland Band"	16 October 2000
Nadim, Biff and Floppy are taken to Clutterland, where they must persuade Old Mother Clutter to feed some of her possessions to the Great Green Garbage Gobbler before the island sinks.
5	"Troll Talk"	30 October 2000
Biff and Gran are captured by trolls who want to use them in a people stew. But when Wilf tries to reason with the trolls, they think he's being rude. How can he make the trolls release them?
6	"The Patchworker"	6 November 2000
Anneena, Chip and Floppy arrive in a patchwork world that needs rearranging.
7	"Code Calling"	13 November 2000
Wilma, Wilf and Floppy are transported to an ancient world, where coded messages are used. Wilma misreads a coded message and mistakenly announces an impending battle. There is then a race against time to find out the true meaning of the message before it is too late.
8	"Zandoodle and the Wheezlebang"	20 November 2000
Zandoodle the wizard creates a monster vacuum cleaner.
9	"Biff of the Jungle"	27 November 2000
Nora Lockmeup has captured a selection of rare animals with the intent of selling them. Wilma sets about releasing the animals – and is promptly captured herself.
10	"Nadim's Machine"	4 December 2000
Wilf and Floppy are captured by the evil Grabber Lotterdosh and turned into robots. Can Nadim de-robotise them?
11	"The Flying Circus"	15 January 2001
Chip, Biff and Floppy are whisked into a world where planes fly themselves, and chaos ensues when Chip finds himself at the flight controller's desk.
12	"Fraser the Eraser"	22 January 2001
Kipper, Gran and Floppy spin into Crayon World, where Fraser the Eraser is intent on rubbing everything out.
13	"The Anneena Academy"	29 January 2001
Anneena, Wilf and Floppy find themselves in a nightmare world – where everyone looks and sounds like Anneena.
14	"Dragon Land"	5 February 2001
Wilma, Nadim and Floppy end up inside the Dragon Land computer game – and if their opponents win, they'll be trapped there for ever.
15	"The Queen of Hearts"	12 February 2001
The bad-tempered Queen of Hearts throws Biff and Kipper into a dungeon after a mix-up over some washing.
16	"Floppy & the Puppies"	26 February 2001
Floppy is tricked by a couple of scheming puppies.
17	"The Giant & the Knee Nibblers"	5 March 2001
The gang are doomed to take part in a never-ending story.
18	"The Cream Cake Mystery"	12 March 2001
Chip, Nadim and Floppy become embroiled in a crime mystery – someone is stealing the baker's cakes.
19	"Mister Hansel & Miss Gretel"	19 March 2001
Anneena, Kipper and Floppy meet Hansel and Gretel and find that they have starring roles in the Grimm Brothers' most famous fairy tale. The question is, does this unique version of the story have a happy ending? It's up to Kipper to confound the wicked witch and save Anneena and Floppy from being oven roasted...if only he could remember what happens next!
20	"The Sound Monster"	26 March 2001
Wilma and Floppy find themselves on an island where the sounds made by the animals are all mixed up.
21	"Tumbleweed Desert"	23 April 2001
The Moochacha family are so cold that they can no longer dance or play their instruments. It all started when Mickey Gringone, the Weather Man, stopped smiling.
22	"The Stone of Contentment"	30 April 2001
Wilf, Chip and Floppy help a distraught Queen Sharon recover the Magic Stone of Contentment from the evil Sir Vile. The trouble is, Sir Wilf has an unhelpful habit of breaking rules, which means Sir Chip is captured and forced to feed coal to Sir Vile's fire-breathing Dragon, Toast. Can Sir Wilf distract Toast, rescue Sir Chip and retrieve the Magic Stone?
23	"The Demon Drill"	14 May 2001
Nadim must persuade all members of the Tool World to pool their resources and work together before their land begins to literally fall apart.
24	"The Fountain of Youth"	21 May 2001
Wilf and Floppy take a drink from the Fountain of Youth, in spite of protests from wary Wilma.
25	"Underwater World"	8 June 2001
The gang get trapped underwater with 3 fruits, a trapeze artist, an alien and a dangerous shark.
26	"Fabulous Fancy Foods"	11 June 2001
Kipper has to choose which new product Fabulous Fancy Foods should promote. The answer is obvious to Floppy, but Kipper isn't very good at making decisions.

== Merchandise and home media ==
To coincide with the TV series, Oxford University Press published a series of books based on the episodes in 2000.

HIT Entertainment released six VHS tapes of the series. The first two – "Troll Talk and Other Stories" and "The Rook King and Other Stories" were released on 30 October 2000. The other three – "Capital Letters And Full Stops". "Adjectives And Labels", and "Sentences And Questions", were released on 24 September 2001, and were aimed to teach children the basics of the English language. Another VHS titled "The Flying Circus and Other Stories" was released in the same year, 2001. HIT would later release all 26 episodes on a two-disc box set on 11 September 2006.
