= Albert Capwell Wyckoff =

American novelist

- Born: February 21, 1903; Plainfield, New Jersey, U.S.
- Died: January 10, 1953 (aged 49); Columbia, Kentucky, U.S.
- Occupations: Presbyterian minister, author
- Notable work: Mercer Boys, Mystery Hunter series
- Spouse: Edna Mae Deakyne (m. 1929)
- Children: 2

Albert Capwell Wyckoff (February 21, 1903 – January 10, 1953) was an ordained minister of the Presbyterian Church in the United States and a writer of juvenile fiction, most notably the Mercer Boys series and Mystery Hunter series.

== Biography ==
=== Early life ===
Wyckoff was born in Plainfield, New Jersey, the son of Albert C. and Eva (Thorn) Wyckoff, and later lived in Elizabeth, New Jersey. He had an older sister and a younger sister and brother

Wyckoff attended Pingry School, where he played on the football team. This school is considered to be the model for the academies in his Mercer Boys series and other books. His father worked for Fox Film of New York; he died while Capwell was a senior in high school. Capwell had to leave school before graduation, and he and his older sister went to work to support the family. He worked for Standard Oil for a few years, and then as a switchboard operator at the Federal Reserve Bank of New York.

=== Marriage and children ===
In 1926, while working at the Federal Reserve Bank, he met Edna Mae Deakyne (May 20, 1906 – June 5, 1992) at a church social. They were married on March 2, 1929, and had two children, Dorothy Jean Wyckoff Finn (August 5, 1931 – March 23, 1985) and Virginia Rae Wyckoff Chapman (born 1934).

=== Writing career ===
While working in the 1920s as a night telephone operator of the Federal Reserve Bank, Wyckoff had time on his hands. wondered if he could write stories, so he acquired a typewriter, taught himself to type with a two-finger method, and began to write. Over the years he wrote plays, short stories, and novels, both adventure tales and Christian stories.

In 1931, Wyckoff's sole known professional (nonfiction) book was published, The Challenge of the Hills, which was published by the Board of National Missions of the Presbyterian Church. It is an account of his missionary work in the Ozarks. At the time, he had been in the mission field for only a year or two.

Wyckoff is best known for his boys' adventure stories, beginning with the ten-book Mercer Boys series, originally published by A. L. Burt. The first Mercer Boys book was based on a trip Wyckoff made with some rather well-to-do friends who had a ship at Bayshore, New York in 1925. Wyckoff did not receive royalties for the books. They were sold outright, and Wyckoff received $200 apiece. With proceeds from the first sales, the Wyckoffs bought their first car and headed for Arkansas to begin their lives as missionaries. He continued writing while engaged in his work in the Ozarks.

The A. L. Burt Company went out of business in 1937 and sold the rights of the Mercer Boys books to World Publishing Company. The first six volumes were reprinted by World in the 1930s and by Falcon Books, a subsidiary of World, in the late 1940s. The latter reprints were modernized and volumes five and six were retitled. The Mercer Boys on the Beach Patrol became The Mercer Boys with the Coast Guard and The Mercer Boys in Summer Camp became The Mercer Boys in the Ghost Patrol.

After the ten Mercer Boys books, Wyckoff wrote the four-book Mystery Hunters series. Also, during the early 1930s, he wrote seven other adventure books. The first two of these feature the same characters, with the book published second, The Secret at Lake Retreat, as the precursor to The Secret of the Armor Room. Seven years after his last adventure novel was published, Wyckoff wrote eight Christian novels. The first four were published by W. B. Eerdmans and the last four by Zondervan. After his twenty-one novels were published, he stopped writing full-length books, and began to produce a number of short stories for magazines like Boys' Life and The Open Road for Boys.

=== Life in the Church ===
Wyckoff was ordained in the Presbyterian Church in 1928. As newlyweds, Wyckoff and Edna went to the southern mountains, first in Arkansas and then in Kentucky, as Sunday School Missionaries, filling this post for twelve years. Later, he was for two years superintendent of home missions in Transylvania Presbytery to the south and west of the Kentucky River in central Kentucky. During the last years of World War II, he served as pastor of First Presbyterian Church in Madisonville, Kentucky. In April 1948 he moved to his last pastorate at Columbia-Union Presbyterian Church in Columbia, Kentucky.

=== Death and burial ===
He died of a heart attack on January 10, 1953, at age 49. Burial was at Columbia Cemetery, Columbia, Kentucky.

== Published works ==
=== Series books ===
==== The Mercer Boys (as Capwell Wyckoff) ====
- 1929:The Mercer Boys' Cruise in the Lassie (revised and reissued 1948)
- 1929:The Mercer Boys at Woodcrest (revised and reissued 1948)
- 1929:The Mercer Boys at Summer Camp (revised and reissued in 1951 as The Mercer Boys in the Ghost Patrol)
- 1929:The Mercer Boys on a Treasure Hunt (revised and reissued 1948)
- 1929:The Mercer Boys' Mystery Case (revised and reissued 1948)
- 1929:The Mercer Boys on the Beach Patrol (revised and reissued in 1949 as The Mercer Boys with the Coast Guard)
- 1930:The Mercer Boys as First Classmen
- 1932:The Mercer Boys and the Indian Gold
- 1932:The Mercer Boys with the Air Cadets
- 1933:The Mercer Boys and the Steamboat Riddle

==== The Mystery Hunters (as Capwell Wyckoff) ====
- 1934:The Mystery Hunters at the Haunted Lodge
- 1934:The Mystery Hunters at Lakeside Camp
- 1934:The Mystery Hunters at Old Frontier
- 1936:The Mystery Hunters on Special Detail

=== Memoir (as Capwell Wyckoff) ===
- 1931:The Challenge of the Hills

=== Other adventure novels (as Capwell Wyckoff) ===
- 1930:The Secret of the Armor Room
- 1931:The Mystery at Lake Retreat
- 1931:In the Camp of the Black Rider
- 1932:The North Point Cabin Mystery
- 1932:The Mystery of Gaither Cove
- 1935:The Sea Runners' Cache
- 1936:The Search for the City of Ghosts

=== Christian novels ===
- 1943:Sounding Brass: A Christian Novel (as Albert C. Wyckoff)
- 1944:Bright Harvest (as A. Capwell Wyckoff)
- 1945:Victory at Daybreak: A Christian Novel (as A. Capwell Wyckoff)
- 1947:The Singing Heart (as A. Capwell Wyckoff)
- 1949:Bright Horizons (as Albert C. Wyckoff)
- 1950:The Bells are Ringing (as Albert C. Wyckoff)
- 1951:The Winning of Kay Slade (as Albert C. Wyckoff)
- 1952:Look to the Hills(as Albert C. Wyckoff)

=== Short stories ===
- "Bridge Race" Young People's Paper April 21, 1940.
- "The Air Mouse" Boys' Life, October 1940. Reprinted in The Mystery and Adventure Series Review, issue #16 (Summer 1985).
- "River Bank Position" Boys' Life, January 1941. Reprinted in The Mystery and Adventure Series Review, issue #16 (Summer 1985).
- "The Yokel" The Open Road for Boys April 1941.
- "Drums for the Sea—Part I" published as a comic strip in The Open Road for Boys June 1943.
- "Drums for the Sea—Part II" The Open Road for Boys July 1943.
- "I Get a Thirst" Young People's Paper, May 4, 1947.
- "Reward of Gratitude" Young People's Paper, November 23, 1947.
- "One Other Way" Young People's Paper, December 14, 1947.
- "Blinky's Ordeal" Pioneer for Boys (the Presbyterian Boys' Paper), January 21, 1950.
- "Welcome, Strangers" Pioneer for Boys February 18, 1950.

== Unpublished works ==
=== Novels ===
Wyckoff wrote two Christian novels that were not published during his lifetime. The typescripts remained in the family archives for decades. One unpublished Christian novel is a full book typescript of 160 pages, without a title page, date, or other information. Wyckoff's daughter knows nothing of its history. It is the account of a young, newly ordained man from Philadelphia, serving for one year as a missionary in the rural and isolated communities in the hills. The time is probably the 1930s. He faces and answers various challenges that cause him to decide what his calling actually is, what his values are, where love truly lies, and ultimately what is most important in life.

The second novel, Enduring Foundations, was completed sometime in the late fall of 1952. He died two or three months later, never having submitted it to Zondervan; it is most likely his last work. His widow, Edna, later submitted it to Zondervan at the urging of friends. In a letter dated January 28, 1955, Zondervan's book editor returned the manuscript, indicating among other reasons for the return that "some in our constituency might object to the portrayal of the Holiness Group (Holiness movement) … trying to force the home mission project out of the community." Virginia affirmed that the incident referred to was based on a true event, and questioned whether her father would have altered that part of the story or not.

The neatly-typed, double-spaced manuscript remained in the possession of the family, eventually passing to his daughter Virginia. At the instigation of fans of Capwell Wyckoff and through Virginia's kindness, Enduring Foundations was typeset and published in 2001 in a limited print run of twenty copies.

=== Plays ===
Wyckoff wrote two unpublished Christian plays between 1927 and 1929, most likely for a Sunday School class or church production.

- Christmas Colors
- Why the Bell Rang

He also wrote three unpublished adventure plays during the same period of time.

- Poison Ivy
- The Tapper
- Unofficial Me

=== Short stories ===
In the family archives there are several unpublished Christian short stories, all of which were written when Wyckoff was the pastor in Columbia, Kentucky.

- "The Grace of God"
- "A Tool in His Hand"
- "Last Ministries"
- "Mr. George's Wish"
- ""Ticket to Camp"
- An Answer to Prayer"

Family archives also include several unpublished adventure short stories, also written when Wyckoff was pastor in Columbia, Kentucky.

- "Grandstand Complex"
- "Lady On Steel"
- "Drumbeat at Trenton"

== See also ==
- Weird Tales
