= Colin West (author) =

English children's book author, poet and illustrator

- Born: 1951 (age 74–75); England
- Education: Wolverhampton Polytechnic, Royal College of Art
- Occupations: Children's book author, poet, illustrator
- Writing career
- Language: English
- Notable works: Monty, the Dog who Wears Glasses, The Big Book of Nonsense, Never Nudge a Budgie
- Website: www.colinwest.com

Colin West (born 1951) is an English children's book author, poet and illustrator. Since 1975, he has written and illustrated over 50 children's books. He studied Graphic Design at Wolverhampton Polytechnic and Illustration at the Royal College of Art under Quentin Blake

West cites Edward Gorey, Ogden Nash and Roger McGough as influences.

== Select bibliography ==
- "Messy Murray Brown"
- "Monty, the Dog who Wears Glasses", 1989 A&C Black ISBN 978-0006736813
- The Adventures of Monty the Dog who Wears Glasses (Monty the Dog who Wears Glasses, Monty Bites Back and Monty Must be Magic in one book) Black, 1995 ISBN 0-7136-4234-3
- Moose and Mouse (I Am Reading series) Macmillan/Kingfisher, 2004 ISBN 978-0-7534-5715-3
- Hello, Great Big Bullfrog Walker, 2009 ISBN 978-1-4063-2102-9
- Have You Seen the Crocodile? Walker, 2009 ISBN 978-1-4063-2101-2
- "The Big Book of Nonsense" Hutchinson, 2001 ISBN 978-0-09-176879-9
- ”Never Nudge a Budgie” Walker Books, 2015 ISBN 978-1-4063-6466-8
- “Nutty Nonsense” Poems and Pictures Publishing, 2022 ISBN 978-1-7398355-9-0
