= The Travels of Wiglington and Wenks =

The Travels of Wiglington and Wenks is originally a series of story books for children, written by John Bittleston and Eliza Quek in 1987, which was later adapted into an online virtual world for children.

== Book series ==
There are four books in the series: The Legacy: London and Paris , The Chase: Venice and Rome, The Crossroads: Istanbul and Turkey, and The Malta Connection: Malta and Singapore. They tell the story of two water rats from Hampshire who travel the world in search of their heritage. The books are illustrated by Lee Kowling.

== Virtual world ==
The Travels of Wiglington and Wenks Virtual World was officially launched on Christmas Eve 2009. The site says that "Some of the features players can experience in the game are building and designing culture-inspired houses, owning exotic islands, throwing parties, performing a range of cool actions, adopting unique pets, wearing clothes from different countries, meeting famous people from the past and present and visiting famous landmarks around the world." By March 1, the number of registered users reached more than 80,000 from 150 countries. It was nominated one of the top five virtual worlds for kids out of 40 other virtual worlds in the Readers' Choice Awards conducted by About.com and came in second after Webkinz. The other three virtual worlds nominated for the top five positions were Club Penguin, Chobots and Webosaurs. Wiglington and Wenks grew, added new features, and billed itself as "the world's most massive virtual world for kids". The world contained over 100 different locations, more than 50 games and a vast amount of information on historical people, animals, plants, inventions, items, architectures and countries. However, the world is currently closed indefinitely due to lack of funds.

The virtual world was developed by Swag Soft - an app development company based in Singapore.
