= Oddies =

Children's book series

The Oddies is a children's book series created by Grant Slatter. It answers the commonly asked question 'Where do all the odd socks go?' The adventurous socks are transported, via a magic washing machine, to the far flung planet of Oddieworld.

The odd sock community of Oddieworld is split into two opposing factions, each dwelling on its own island - Good Oddie Island and Bad Oddie Island. The founding members of Oddieworld, Fairy, Witchy and Wizzo, conjure up odd socks with different skills and characters to help them in their quests - either to help stop or to cause mischief.

The Oddies are widely used in schools, nurseries, libraries, Scouting and Guiding groups across the UK as part of Read With Me Week, a profit free reading initiative that takes place in the first week of November every year. The week encourages children to embrace the fun elements of storytelling and culminates in a competition in which participants have the chance to invent a new character to add to the Oddies series. 500,000 children entered the competition in 2005, and to date, eight children under the age of ten have become published authors as a result of their involvement with Read With Me Week and The Oddies.

In an odd turn of real world events, a batch of 25,000 pairs of socks intended as an accessory to the books was stolen in September 2005 from a lorry depot near Ipswich.
