= Fluffy Little Kitten =

Series of children's books by Robert Bassett

Fluffy Little Kitten is a series of children's books by British author Robert Bassett, published in 2007 and 2008.

== History ==
The books in the Fluffy Little Kitten series were originally published as e-books and sold on eBay. Bassett claims the books were written as a joke to impress his long suffering girlfriend.

Though attracting little attention at publication between late 2007 and early 2008, the books achieved some noteworthiness in January 2009 when mentioned in a column in The Guardian newspaper. The columnist Zoe Williams alluded to the books favorably in a general critique of children's books.

In May 2009 it was announced that CBeebies (the children's arm of the BBC) had commissioned six Fluffy Little Kitten stories for broadcast in the autumn.

The fourth book in the series, Fluffy Little Kitten in Fluffy's Brother was longlisted for the Bookseller/Diagram Prize for Oddest Title of the Year 2009

== Common themes ==
Each book features a small brown kitten called Fluffy, who becomes upset and cries, usually because of a very minor problem. Once he calms down and his situation is explained to him fully he cheers up and, in the closing page of each book, "everything works out alright in the end."

== List of books ==
Following is a list of published book titles with associated summaries of their texts.

#	Character name/book title	First published	ISBN
1	Too Many Kittens	2007	978-0955745508
Fluffy Little Kitten goes to the Kitten Disco, but becomes concerned that there are so many kittens present, his parents will not be able to find him. After realising that he alone of all the kittens has brown fur and a blue collar, everything works out all right in the end.
2	Fluffy Little Kitten Falls Over	2008	978-0955745515
Fluffy Little Kitten goes to Kitten Stadium to play football. When he falls over in front of the crowd, he worries that he will be laughed at. However, when all of his team mates pretend to fall over in sympathy, everything turns out all right in the end.
3	Fluffy Little Kitten's Birthday	2008	978-0955745522
When Fluffy Little Kitten catches the measles, he becomes upset because no one will be able to come to his party. However it turns out that all of his friends have the measles too and so can attend, with everything turning out all right in the end.
4	Fluffy's Brother	2008	978-0955745560
Fluffy Little Kitten is off to have fun with his friends in the park but becomes upset about his little brother, who follows Fluffy and copies everything that he does. It turns out that Fluffy's brother only copies Fluffy because he loves and admires him, so everything turns out all right in the end.

Too Many Kittens, 2007

Fluffy Little Kitten Falls Over, 2008

Fluffy Little Kitten's Birthday, 2008
