= Firland =

Firland is a children's fantasy book series by Norman Sandiford Power. The third book appears to have only been published in Denmark.

== Books ==
- The Forgotten Kingdom aka The Forgotten Kingdom: The Firland Saga aka *The Firland Saga (novel) (1970, 1973)
- Fear in Firland (novel) (1974)
- Firland i flammer (novel) (1974)
