= Monty the Dog =

Book by Colin West

- The title character on the front cover of Monty, the Dog who Wears Glasses.

Monty the Dog is a cartoon character created by British author Colin West. The character appeared in six books beginning in 1989, and was subsequently used as the basis for a television series. The series, consisting of 13 episodes, was produced by Ealing Animation and aired on BBC1 from 1994 to 1995.

== Character ==
Monty is a pet dog owned by the Sprod family (Mr. and Mrs. Sprod and their children Simon and Josie). He wears his trademark red glasses which the Sprod family made for him following a suggestion from a cyclist who nearly hit him the day before. Monty still appears to be accident-prone, and he likes to eat sausages, chocolate biscuits, ice cream, custard, mince pies and Walnut Whips which often gets him into trouble.

== Novels ==
The novels were published by A & C Black as part of the Jets series. They follow more or less the same format, the first book including the explanation of why Monty wears glasses. The story is told through text and black and white illustrations with an occasional speech bubble for the human characters, and a thought bubble for Monty's thoughts. The cover illustrations are in colour.

- Monty, the Dog who Wears Glasses (A&C Black, 1989; ISBN 9780006736813)
- Monty Bites Back (1990) (A&C Black, 1990, ISBN 9780525447771)
  - Published in the United States as Shape Up Monty! (Dutton Children's Books, 1991, ISBN 9780525447771)
- Monty - up to his neck in trouble (A&C Black, 1991, ISBN 9780713634891)
- Monty Must be Magic (A&C Black, 1992, ISBN 9780713636154)
- Monty Ahoy! (A&C Black, 1994, ISBN 9780713639872)
- Monty's Ups and Downs (Bloomsbury, 1996, ISBN 9780713644562)

== Television series ==
A television series made by Ealing Animation titled Monty based on the character was first broadcast on BBC1 in 1994 to 1995. Unlike the novels in which Monty's glasses do not have lenses it is implied that Monty is short sighted and has lenses in his glasses on television.

=== Episodes ===
- Monty's Picnic
- Monty Goes to School
- Monty and the Cat Next Door
- Monty's Magic Trick
- Monty Gets the Blame
- Monty at the Vets
- Monty at the Library
- Monty at the Supermarket
- Monty at the Park
- Monty at the School Fete
- Monty Goes Missing
- Monty Meets Bruiser
- Monty and the Monsters

=== Credits ===
- From the Stories by: Colin West
- Writer: Jimmy Hibbert
- Narrator/Voices: Griff Rhys-Jones
- Animation: For Ealing; Neil Salmon, Kevin Baldwin, Malcolm Bourne
- Computer Operators: David Brylewski, Kieron Murtage, Cornelia van de Water, John McManus
- Layouts: David Elvin
- Backgrounds: Vivienne Redmond
- Producer for Ealing Animation: Richard Randolph
- Executive Producer: Theresa Plummer-Andrews
- Associate Producer: Helen Crossen
- Producer: Jill Green
- Director: David Lewis
- A Red Rooster Film & Television Entertainment Production for Children's International BBC and BBC Scotland.
