= Motor Boat Boys =

Front cover of Motor Boat Boys' Mississippi Cruise, 1914 edition.

The Motor Boat Boys, by Louis Arundel, is a series of adventure books for boys, published by M. A. Donohue & Co., Chicago, Illinois, from 1912 through 1915. The series featured six teen-aged boys of the Motor Boat Club, and their adventures on various waterways.

The first book in the series, Motor Boat Boys, followed a group of boys racing down the Mississippi River. Along the way, the boys encountered numerous difficulties but succeeded in winning the race.

== Boats and crews ==
- Tramp

Pilot: Jack Stormaways (also Commodore of the Motor Boat Club)
Mate: Jimmy Brannagan

- Wireless

Pilot: George Rollins
Mate: Nick Longfellow

- Comfort

Pilot: Herb Dickson
Mate: Josh Purdue

== Series titles ==
- Motor Boat Boys' Mississippi Cruise; or The Dash for Dixie, 1912.
- Motor Boat Boys on the Great Lakes; or Exploring the Mystic Isle of Mackinac, 1912.
- Motor Boat Boys on the St. Lawrence River; or Adventures Among the Thousand Islands , 1912.
- Motor Boat Boys Among the Florida Keys; or The Struggle for the Leadership, 1913.
- Motor Boat Boys Down the Coast; or Through Storm and Stress to Florida, 1913.
- Motor Boat Boys' River Chase; or Six Chums Afloat and Ashore, 1914.
- Motor Boat Boys Down the Danube; or Caught in the Whirlpool of War, 1915.
