= Aldo Zelnick =

Children's book series

Aldo Zelnick is a comic novel children's book series intended for middle-grade students, written by Karla Oceanak and illustrated by Kendra Spanjer. These books have titles written in alphabetical order and follow the life of a ten-year-old boy, Aldo, and are written and illustrated as entries in Aldo's sketchbook. The books contain handwritten-looking text mixed with black-and-white cartoon illustrations. Each book also focuses on vocabulary building for each different letter of the alphabet.

== Books ==
Currently there are thirteen books in the series.

1. Artsy-Fartsy (2009)
2. Bogus (2010)
3. Cahoots (2011)
4. Dumbstruck (2011)
5. Egghead (2012)
6. Finicky (2012)
7. Glitch (2012)
8. Hotdogger (2013)
9. Ignoramus (2013)
10. Jackpot (2014)
11. Kerfuffle (2015)
12. Logjam (2016)
13. Mooch (2018)

== Book One ==
=== Artsy-Fartsy ===
Ten-year-old Aldo Zelnick is given a sketchbook by his grandma, Goosy. Aldo likes to draw but is worried about being made fun of for being "artsy-fartsy". It is summer vacation and Aldo is forced outside by his mother to find some exercise and fresh air. Along with his best friend Jack, Aldo reluctantly explores the outside world; he would rather prefer playing video games or watch TV on his couch. Since he must be outside, Aldo and his friends decide make a fort to hide in. One day, Aldo comes back to the fort and finds his sketchbook has been vandalised by a girl, although he does not know who. Aldo and his friend Jack take it upon themselves to find out. This books includes A vocabulary words like abominable, aficionado, alliteration, and audacious.

==== Awards ====
- 2009 Book of the Year Award winner by Foreword Reviews in the juvenile fiction category and a finalist in the graphic novel category
- 2010 Colorado Book Award for juvenile literature
- 2010 Mountains & Plains Independent Booksellers Association Regional Book Award
- IndieBound Books Winter 2010-2011 Kids’ Next List
- 2010 Seal of Excellence from Creative Child magazine

== Book Two ==
=== Bogus ===
Aldo has decided it was okay to be a little "artsy-fartsy" and decides to start another sketchbook to doodle in for his summer vacation, this time filled with B words. One day while Aldo is outside with his best friend Jack, who collects rocks, the pair stumble upon what looks like a diamond ring. The boys proceed to play catch with it in the pool, dunk it in a fishbowl and generally treat it as a toy. It is not until they see a poster with a $1,000 reward for the ring that they realize that not only is the ring real, but they lost it. Aldo and Jack try to retrace their summer steps to find the "bogus" ring. This book contains B vocabulary words like behemoth, blithely, bounding and bodacious.

==== Awards ====
- 2011 Seal of Excellence from Creative Child Magazine
- 2011 IPPY silver medal from Independent Publisher in the graphic novel-humor/cartoon category

== Book Three ==
=== Cahoots ===
Aldo’s parents have frustrated at Aldo's summer vacation consisting of drinking slushies, eating taquitos and playing video games. The Zelnick family decide to pay a visit to their "laid-back" relatives, who live on a farm in Minnesota, in order for Aldo to breathe fresh air. When Aldo walks into his aunt and uncle's house, he is surprised that there is no television, no video games, no computer, or no electronics of any kind. Aldo has to team up with his brother Timothy, who has athletic, masculine characteristics, in order to work as a farmer; by milking cows, churning butter, and gathering eggs. Timothy and Aldo have to work as a team to outsmart their twin cousins, who like to prank at them. Later, during the visit, Aldo and Timothy find a mystery in the house that they need to solve together. This book also contains several C vocabulary words, such as cacophony, cantankerous, clandestine, and copacetic.

==== Awards ====
- 2011 Preferred Choice Award from Creative Child magazine
- 2011 Silver Moonbeam Children’s Book Award
- Chosen as one of Dr. Toy’s 100 Best Children’s Products of 2011 and one of Dr. Toy’s 10 Best Educational Products of 2011

== Book Four ==
=== Dumbstruck ===
School has recommenced for Aldo and Jack, and their new year as fifth-graders contains many surprises. Aldo's home-schooled neighborhood friend, Bee comes to school for art and music classes, along with a new student named Danny, who is deaf. Along with these additions comes the new art teacher, Ms. Munroe, who looks attractive, and literally makes the suddenly shy Aldo dumbstruck. Ms. Munroe announces a special art contest and Aldo becomes excited to finally have an excuse to show off his art skills, but Danny and Bee both try to challenge his talent. The end of the book contains a key to the sign language alphabet as well as several ASL signs. This book also contains a number of D vocabulary words, such as defenestrate, dissipate, diminutive, and duplicity.

==== Awards ====
- 2011 Quid Novi Book Design Award

== Book Five ==
=== Egghead ===
Set in October, Aldo believes he is Albert Einstein. He has self-satisfaction over his exemplary first-quarter grades and test scores, and he even decides to dress as the scientist for Halloween. But he becomes disillusioned when he realizes he does not do well in Spanish, and that the consequences may be more hurtful than a bad grade on a report card. Aldo's relationship with his bilingual best friend, Jack, is also at risk.

== Characters ==
=== Aldo ===
Aldo Zelnick is a ten-year-old boy and the main character of the series. He is slightly fat and has curly orange hair. Aldo has a sedentary lifestyle and does not like to participate in any activity that makes him tired or sweaty. He would rather hang out on the couch, watching video games or eat his father's cooking. In Artsy-Fartsy, Aldo is given a sketchbook by his grandmother, Goosy, to draw in. Aldo is embarrassed by his drawing and is mortified that someone might find out.

=== Jack ===
Jack is Aldo's best friend. Jack lives a few houses down the street from Aldo. Jack is fluent in both English and Spanish and is a huge rock collector. Jack knows about rocks, and has huge collections of them at his Mom and Dad's house, although Jack's parents are divorced. He eats peanut butter sandwiches every day for lunch and owns a metal detector.

=== Bee ===
Bee, or Abby, is Jack and Aldo's friend from down the street. The boys meet her for the first time when she finds and draws in Aldo's sketchbook. Bee likes the outdoors very much, and is the fastest runner on Aldo's baseball team and is the best limber they know. Bee is home-schooled and an environmentalist. She is very interested in vegetables and has her own vegetable garden. She has dark hair and glasses.

=== Danny ===
Danny is a boy at Dana Elementary School. He has long, dark hair and is deaf. Danny speaks in American Sign Language and just started coming to school for gym and art. He is an excellent artist and likes to play jokes on Aldo.

=== Timothy ===
Timothy is Aldo's 14-year-old brother. Timothy is what Aldo calls a "super-jock". He is very good at exercising and the polar opposite of Aldo. Timothy is a typical teenager who likes to sleep till noon and is an "uber-texter".

=== Mrs. Claire Zelnick ===
Mrs. Zelnick is Aldo and Timothy's mom. She firmly believes in outdoor activities and loves sending Aldo outside for fresh air and exercise. She grew up on a farm in Minnesota and likes to do outdoor things like yoga with Aldo.

=== Mr. Leo Zelnick ===
Mr. Zelnick is Aldo and Timothy's dad. He passed on his "sea-sponge hair gene" to Aldo. He likes to cook and bake. which Aldo loves. He is sympathetic to Aldo's problems and likes to watch cricket matches on TV.

=== Goosy ===
Goosy is Aldo and Timothy's grandma Lucy. She is a painter and sculptor, and encourages her grandson Aldo to draw in his sketchbooks. She is slightly eccentric and does Bohemian dancing, drives a motorcycle and likes to throw her bad art out the window.

=== Mr. Mot ===
Mr. Mot is one of Aldo's neighbors and is a retired English teacher. He is passionate talking about literature such as plays and books. He encourages Aldo to learn new words for very letter of the alphabet and gives him the idea of recording them in his sketchbook. Mr. Mot sometimes volunteers with Aldo's class at school to help act out plays. Mr. Mot also helps Aldo with his romantic issues and plays checkers with him.

=== Tommy Geller ===
Tommy is Aldo's archenemy. Tommy calls Aldo the "Mighty Geek" or "MG" for short due to the stale of Aldo's drawings. He is the neighborhood bully and has hairy feet. Aldo is terrified that Tommy will find out about his sketchbooks.
