= Roderick Hunt =

British children's author

Roderick Hunt MBE
- Born: South Africa
- Occupation: Writer
- Writing career
- Period: 1939–present
- Genre: Children's literature
- Notable work: The Magic Key

Roderick James Hunt MBE is a British children's author. His most famous series of stories is The Magic Key, which was first written as a part of the Oxford Reading Tree in 1985 and illustrated by Alex Brychta MBE. There were originally 30 stories, and there are now over 400.

== Education ==
Hunt studied divinity and English at the University of Chester and was appointed a Member of the Most Excellent Order of the British Empire (MBE) in 2008 "for services to Education, particularly Children's Literacy".

== Career ==
The Magic Key books are used by over 80% of British primary schools to help children learn to read, in addition to schools in more than 120 other countries. Along with Alex Brychta, who illustrates his stories, he was awarded an Outstanding Achievement Award in the Education Resources Awards in 2009.

In addition to The Magic Key, Hunt is also the author of the Read at Home and Wolf Hill series of stories, as well as many others.
